= List of Eastern Orthodox saints (A–G) =

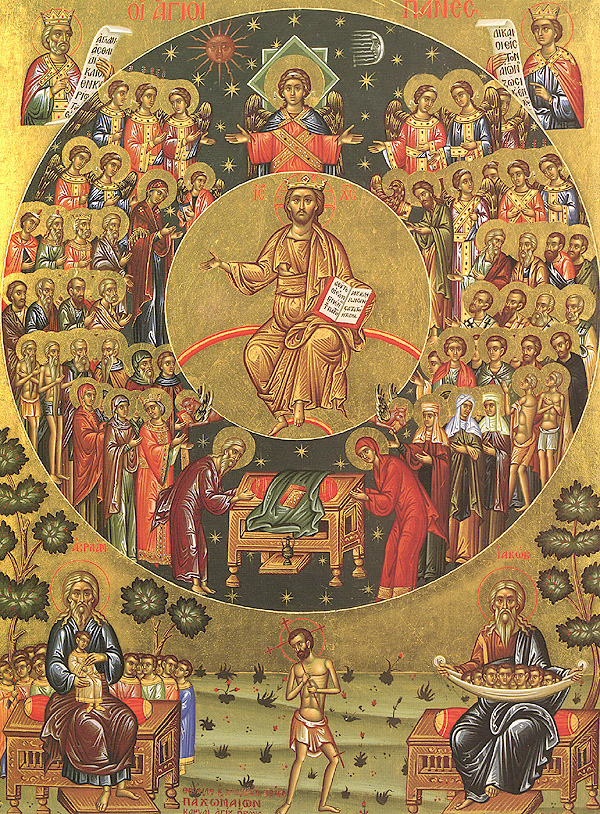
Icon depicting the Synaxis of All Saints; various saints can be identified by their saint attributes, such as Patriarch Abraham (bottom left, silver hair) or Patriarch Jacob (bottom right, seated).

This is an incomplete list of canonised saints in the Eastern Orthodox Church.

In Eastern Orthodoxy, a saint is defined as anyone, other than God, who is in heaven, whether recognised here on earth, or not. By this definition, Adam and Eve, Moses, the various prophets, and archangels are all given the title of Saint. Sainthood in the Orthodox Church does not necessarily reflect a moral model, but communion with God; there are many examples of people who lived in great sin and became saints by humility and repentance: Saints Mary of Egypt, Moses the Ethiopian, and Dismas, the repentant thief who was crucified with Jesus Christ. Therefore, a more complete Orthodox definition of what a saint is, has to do with the way that saints, through their humility and their love of mankind, saved inside them the entire Church, and loved all people.

Orthodox belief states that God reveals saints through answered prayers and other miracles. Saints are usually recognised by their local community, often by people who directly knew them. As their popularity grows they are often then recognised by the entire Church through the Holy Spirit. The word canonisation means that a Christian has been found worthy to have his name placed in the canon (official list) of saints of the Church. The formal process of recognition involves deliberation by a synod of bishops. Evidence of a virtuous life and prior local veneration of the saint are required for canonization.

Because the Church shows no true distinction between the living and the dead, as the saints are considered to be alive in heaven, saints are referred to as if they are still alive, and are venerated, not worshipped. They are believed to be able to intercede for the living for salvation or other requests and help mankind either through direct communion with God or by personal intervention.

== List ==
Some saints listed may also be a part of a larger group of saints also listed (particularly martyrs, such as Saint Laura of Córdoba and the Martyrs of Córdoba).

Image	Saint	Died (Year)	Feast Day (NS/OS)	Notes
	3 Holy Children	600–501 BC	Sunday of the Holy Forefathers	Holy Youths, Righteous, whose names were Hananiah (Ananias), Mishael (Misael) and Azariah (Azarias); given the Chaldean names Shadrach, Meshach and Abednego
	3 Holy Hierarchs	379, 389 and 407	30 January	Ecumenical Teachers, Venerable Bishops; whose names were Basil, Gregory and John
	3 Magi	1–100	25 December	Kings from the East who brought the gifts of gold, frankincense, and myrrh to the Christ Child in Matthew 1, a.k.a. the 3 Wise Men, whose names were Melchior, Caspar, and Balthasar
	3 Martyrs of Vilnius	1347	14 April	Martyrs; whose names were Anthony, John, and Eustathius
	7 Brothers of Lazia	304	24 June	Martyrs; whose names were Orentius, Cyriacus, Firminus, Firmus, Heros, Longinus, and Pharnacius
	7 Robbers of Corfu	c. 63	28 April	Martyrs; whose names were Saturninus, Insischolus (Jakischolus), Faustianus, Januarius, Marsalius, Euphrasius, and Mammius
	7 Sleepers of Ephesus	447	4 August / 22 October	Holy Youths; Christian men who escaped the Decian persecution (AD 250) by hiding in a cave and were sealed in it until 447, when they awoke; whose names were Maximilian, Iamblicus, Martinian, John, Dionysius, Exacustodianus and Antoninus
	9 Brothers Kherkheulidze	1625	3 August	Martyrs, killed at the Battle of Marabda along with their mother, sister and 9,000 companions
	9 Maccabean Martyrs	167–160 BC	1 August	Martyrs; whose names were Eleazar, Solomonia, Abim, Antonius, Gurias, Eleazar, Eusebonus, Alimus and Marcellus, the latter seven being sons of St. Solomonia and students of St. Eleazar
	12 Apostles	44–101	30 June	Apostles appointed by Jesus Christ to fulfil the Great Commission; whose names were Peter, Andrew, James, John, Philip, Bartholomew, Thomas, Matthew, James, Jude, Simon and Paul
	13 Assyrian Apostles	501–600	20 May	Equals-to-the-Apostles, Venerable missionaries to the Kingdom of Iberia; whose names were David, John, Abibos, Shio, Joseph, Anthony, Thaddeus, Pyrrhus, Jesse, Stephen, Isidore, Michael and Zenon; a.k.a. 13 Assyrian Fathers
	13 Martyrs of Kantara	1231	19 May	Venerable Martyrs; monks of the Kantara Monastery in Crusader Cyprus who were martyred under the orders of Pope Gregory IX for using leavened bread in the Eucharist
	33 Martyrs of Melitene	290	7 November	Martyrs; whose names were Hieron, Hesychius, Nicander, Athanasius, Mamas, Barachius, Callinicus, Theogenes, Nicon, Longinus, Theodore, Valerius, Xanthius, Theodulus, Callimachus, Eugene, Theodochus, Ostrychius, Epiphanius, Maximian, Ducitius, Claudian, Theophilus, Gigantius, Dorotheus, Theodotus, Castrychius, Anicetus, Theomelius, Eutychius, Hilarion, Diodotus and Amonitus
	40 Martyrs of Sebaste	320	9 March	Martyrs, Military Saints; who were martyred by being left naked in the cold; whose names were Hesychius, Meliton, Heraclius, Smaragdus, Domnus, Eunoicus, Valens, Vivianus, Claudius, Priscus, Theodulus, Euthychius, John, Xanthias, Helianus, Sisinius, Cyrion, Angius, Aetius, Flavius, Acacius, Ecditius, Lysimachus, Alexander, Elias, Candidus, Theophilus, Dometian, Gaius, Gorgonius, Eutyches, Athanasius, Cyril, Sacerdon, Nicholas, Valerius, Philoctimon, Severian, Chudion, and Aglaius
	42 Martyrs of Amorium	845	6 March	Martyrs; Byzantine officials who were captured by the Abbasids during the Siege of Amorium and refused to convert to Islam; some of whose names were Theodore Krateros, Aetios, Theophilos, Constantine Baboutzikos, Bassoes, Kallistos and Constantine
	42 Martyrs of Momišići	1688	22 March [O.S. 9 March]	New Martyrs, who consisted of 2 priest-teachers and their 40 students and were martyred by the Ottomans in Momišići, Montenegro
	47 First Martyrs of Rome	c. 67	14 March	Protomartyrs of the Patriarchate of Rome
	48 Martyrs of Córdoba	850–859	Various	Martyrs; whose names were Perfectus, Isaac, Sanctius (Sancius, Sancho), Peter, Walabonsus, Sabinian, Wistremundus, Habentius, Jeremiah, Sisenandus, Paul of St Zoilus, Theodemir, Flora, Maria, Gumesindus, Servusdei, Leovigild, Christopher, Emilas, Jeremiah, Rogellus, Servus-Dei, Fandilas, Anastasius, Felix, Digna, Benildis, Columba, Pomposa, Abundius, Amator, Peter, Louis, Witesindus, Elias, Paul, Isidore, Argymirus (Argimirus, Argimir), Aurelius, Natalia (Sabigotho), Liliosa, Felix, George, Aurea (Aura), Roderick (Rudericus), Solomon (Salomon), Eulogius, Leocritia (Lucretia) and Sandila (Sandalus, Sandolus, Sandulf)
	49 Martyrs of Abitinae	304	12 February	Martyrs; whose names were Saturninus the Presbyter, Saturninus the Reader, Felix the Reader, Mary (Maria), Hilarion (the former all children of Saturninus the Presbyter), Dativus (Sanator), Felix, Felix, Emeritus the Reader, Ampelius the Reader, Benignus (Ampelius' infant son), Rogatianus, Quintus, Maximianus (Maximus), Telica (Tazelita), Rogatianus, Rogatus, Januarius, Cassianus, Victorianus, Vincentius, Caecilianus, Restituta, Prima, Eve (Eva), Rogatianus, Givalius, Rogatus, Pomponia, Secunda, Januaria, Saturnina, Martinus, Clautus, Felix, Margaret, Major, Honorata, Regiola, Victorinus, Pelusius, Faustus, Dacianus, Matrona, Caecilia, Victoria the Virgin, Berectina, Secunda, Matrona and Januaria
	60 Martyrs of Jerusalem	c. 639	unknown	Martyrs, Military Saints
	79 Venerable Martyrs of Sinai and Raithu	301–400	14 January	Venerable Martyrs; 40 were killed at Mount Sinai and 39 at Raithu; some of whose names were Isaiah, Sabbas, Moses and his disciple Moses, Jeremiah, Paul, Adam, Sergius, Domnus, Proclus, Hypatius, Isaac, Macarius, Mark, Benjamin, Eusebius, and Elias
	222 Martyrs of China	1900	11 June	New Martyrs, Protomartyrs of China, martyred by the Boxers during the Boxer Rebellion; some of whose names were Metrophanes, Tatiana, Isaiah, Sergius (Sergiy), John (Ioann), Mary (Maria), Anne, Matthew, Paul, Clement and Ia the Teacher
	300 Aragvian Martyrs	1795	11 September	Martyrs
	300 Martyrs of Lazeti	1600–1620	29 April	Martyrs
	321 New Martyrs of Butovo (Note: A total of 20,762 people were executed in Butovo firing range, of which around 1,000 were executed for their Orthodox faith. As of May 2009, the Russian Orthodox Church has the names of 321 martyrs in its list of the New Martyrs of Butovo.)	1937–1938	Fourth Saturday after Pascha	New Martyrs, martyred by the NKVD at Butovo firing range (the "Russian Golgotha"), part of the New Martyrs and Confessors of the Russian Orthodox Church
	377 Martyrs of Adrianople	815	22 January	Martyrs; some of whose names were Manuel, George, Leo, Peter, John, Parodos, Gabriel, Sionios, Loubomiros, Chotomiros, Koupergos, and Asfir; a.k.a. 377 Martyred Companions in Bulgaria
	10,000 Martyrs of Antioch	249–251	1 June	Martyrs
	14,000 Holy Innocents	c. 2 BC	29 December	Child Martyrs; martyred by Herod the Great in his attempt to kill the Baby Jesus
	20,000 Martyrs of Nicomedia	301–305	28 December	Martyrs
	100,000 Martyrs of Tbilisi	1226	31 October	Martyrs
	700,000 New Martyrs of Jasenovac (Note: This figure is given by St. Nikolaj Velimirović in his entry on the Jasenovac Martyrs in the Prologue of Ohrid. Various figures are given for the number of Serbs killed, ranging from 100,000 to 750,000.)	1941–1945	13 September [O.S. 31 August]	New Martyrs, who were martyred by the Ustaše in and around Jasenovac concentration camp
	Aaron	c. 1569 BC	Sunday of the Holy Forefathers	Prophet, High Priest, elder brother of Prophet Moses
	Aaron of Aleth	c. 552	22 June	Bishop of Aleth, Abbot, Venerable
	Abbán of Corbmaic	501–600	27 October	Abbot, Venerable, nephew of St. Kevin
	Abbán of Leinster	401–500	16 March	Abbot, Venerable, founder of Kill-Abban Monastery, nephew of St. Ibar
	Abbo of Auxerre	860	3 December	Bishop of Auxerre, Abbot of the Abbey of Saint-Germain d'Auxerre, Venerable
	Abbo of Fleury	1004	13 November	Abbot of Fleury Abbey, Venerable Martyr
	Abel	c. 64 AM – c. 130 AM	Sunday of the Holy Forefathers	Righteous; who was the first man to die, as he was murdered by his older brother Cain
	Abgar V of Edessa	c. 50	11 May / 28 October	King of Osroene, first Christian monarch; who according to legend received the Mandylion and a letter handwritten by Jesus
	Abibon	33–50	2 August	Righteous, son of St. Gamaliel the Rabban; a.k.a. Abibas
	Abibos of Nekresi	501–600	29 November	Bishop of Nekresi, Venerable Hieromartyr, one of the 13 Assyrian Apostles
	Abibus of Edessa	322	15 November	Hieromartyr, Deacon; a.k.a. Habib the Deacon and Habibus
	Abo of Tiflis	c. 786	8 January	New Martyr; a.k.a. Abo the Perfumer
	Abraham	Patriarchal Age	9 October	Patriarch, Righteous, previously known as Abram
	Abraham of Bulgaria	1229	1 April / 9 March	Martyr; a convert from Islam killed by his compatriots
	Abraham of Ephesus	501–600	28 October	Bishop, Venerable; who founded many monasteries
	Abraham of Galich	1375	20 July	Hegumen, Venerable, disciple of St. Sergius of Radonezh
	Abraham of Mirozha	1158	24 September	Hegumen of Mirozh, Venerable
	Abraham of Paleostrov	c. 1460	21 August	Venerable, disciple of St. Cornelius of Paleostrov
	Abraham of Rostov	1045–1074	29 October	Archimandrite, Venerable
	Abraham of Smolensk	1222	21 August	Venerable Wonderworker, Hieromonk
	Abraham the Laborious	1101–1350	21 August	Venerable, the Laborious
	Abrahamite Martyrs	c. 835	6 July	Venerable Martyrs
	Acacius of Amida	425	9 April (?)	Bishop of Amida, Venerable; who ransomed for the freedom of 7000 Persian prisoners
	Acacius of Byzantium	c. 303	7 May	Martyr; a.k.a. Acacius the Centurion, Agathius, Achatius, and Agathonas
	Acacius of Kavsokalyvia	1730	12 April	Venerable, Athonite monk, Righteous; a.k.a. Akakios the Younger and Acacius the New
	Acathius of Melitene	250	31 March / 15 September	Bishop of Melitene, Venerable Hieromartyr; a.k.a. Agathangelos, Acathius or Achates
	Acacius of Melitene	c. 437 – c. 500	27 April	Bishop of Melitene, Venerable
	Acacius of Sebaste	c. 304	27 November	Hieromartyr
	Achaicus of Corinth	33–100	15 June / 4 January	Apostle of the Seventy, Hieromartyr
	Achillas of Alexandria	313	7 November	Patriarch of Alexandria, Venerable
	Achillius of Larissa	330	15 May	Metropolitan of Larissa, Venerable; who condemned Arianism at the First Ecumenical Council; a.k.a. Achilles, Ailus, Achillas, or Achilius
	Adam	930 AM	Sunday of the Holy Forefathers / Forgiveness Sunday	Forefather, Righteous, the Proto-Created, the first man
	Adelaide of Italy	999	16 December	Holy Roman Empress, Righteous
	Adeodatus I	618	8 November	Patriarch of Rome, Venerable
	Adrian of Nicomedia	306	26 August	Martyr, husband of St. Natalia of Nicomedia; a.k.a. Hadrian
	Ælfheah the Bald	951	12 March	Bishop of Winchester, Venerable, the Elder; a.k.a. Alphege
	Ælfheah of Canterbury	1012	19 April	Archbishop of Canterbury, Bishop of Winchester, Venerable, Abbot of Bath Abbey, Venerable Hieromartyr; a.k.a. Alphege the Martyr
	Ælfric of Abingdon	1005	16 November	Archbishop of Canterbury, Bishop of Wilton, Abbot of Abingdon Abbey, Venerable; a.k.a. Alfric
	Æthelberht of Kent	616	25 February	King of Kent; a.k.a. Æthelbert, Aethelberht, Aethelbert and Ethelbert
	Æthelhard of Canterbury	805	12 May	Archbishop of Canterbury, Venerable; a.k.a. Ethelhard and Aethelheard
	Æthelhelm of Canterbury	923	8 January	Archbishop of Canterbury, Bishop of Wells, Abbot of Glastonbury Abbey, Venerable; a.k.a. Athelm
	Æthelnoth of Canterbury	1038	30 October	Archbishop of Canterbury, Venerable, the Good; a.k.a. Ethelnoth, Ednoth and Eadnodus
	Afan of Bulith	501–600	16 November	Bishop of Llanbadarn or Builth, Venerable Hieromartyr; founder of the church of Llanafan, Wales
	Agabus	33–100	8 April / 4 January	Prophet, Apostle of the Seventy, Martyr
	Agape, Chionia, and Irene	304	16 April	Virgin Martyrs
	Agapetus I	536	17 April	Patriarch of Rome, Venerable
	Agapetus of Pechersk	1001–1100	1 June	Unmercenary Healer, Venerable, monk in the Kyiv Pechersk Lavra; a.k.a. Agapetus of the Caves
	Agatha of Sicily	c. 251	5 February	Virgin Martyr
	Agatho of Rome	681	20 February	Patriarch of Rome, Venerable
	Agathon of Scetis	c. 435	2 March / 8 January	Desert Father, Venerable
	Aglaida of Rome	c. 201 – c. 350	19 December	Righteous, romantic partner of St. Boniface; a.k.a. Aglae
	Agnes of Rome	c. 305	21 January	Virgin Martyr
	Ahmet the Calligrapher	1682	3 May / 24 December	New Martyr; a convert from Islam killed by his companions; a.k.a. Ahmed
	Aidan of Ferns	626	31 January	Bishop of Ferns, Abbot, Venerable; a.k.a. Máedóc, Madoc and Mogue
	Aidan of Lindisfarne	651	31 August	Apostle of Northumbria, Venerable
	Alena of Belgium	c. 640	18 June	Virgin Martyr; a.k.a. Alène and Alina
	Alexander Hotovitzky	1937	4 December / 7 August	New Hieromartyr
	Alexander Nevsky	1263	23 November / 30 August	Grand Prince of Vladimir and Novgorod, Right-Believing
	Alexander of Constantinople	340	30 August	Archbishop of Constantinople, Venerable; whose fervent prayer led to the painful death of Arius
	Alexander of Jerusalem	251	16 May / 12 December	Church Father, Patriarch of Jerusalem, Venerable Hieromartyr
	Alexander of Rome	284–305	13 May	Martyr
	Alexander of Svir	1533	30 August	Hegumen of Alexander-Svirsky Monastery, Venerable; a.k.a. Alexander Svirsky
	Alexander I of Alexandria	326 / 328	29 May	Church Father, Patriarch of Alexandria, Venerable; who fought against Arianism
	Alexander I of Rome	c. 116	16 March	Patriarch of Rome, Venerable Hieromartyr
	Alexander of Munich	1943	13 July	Passion Bearer; the only Orthodox member of the White Rose resistance group, who was executed by the Nazis; native name Alexander Schmorell
	Alexander (Trapitsyn)	1938	14 January	Archbishop of Pugachyov, New Venerable Hieromartyr
	Alexandra the Passion Bearer	1918	17 July	Passion Bearer, Empress of Russia as the spouse of St Nicholas II, one of the Romanov Martyrs
	Alexei Nikolaevich	1918	17 July	Passion Bearer, one of the Romanov Martyrs
	Alexei Shepelev	1917	11 March / 21 September	Venerable Hieromonk, who had the spiritual gift of prophecy
	Alexis of Wilkes-Barre	1909	7 May	Hieroconfessor, Defender of Orthodoxy; who converted 20,000 Ruthenian Catholics to Orthodoxy; a.k.a. Alexis Toth
	Alexis of Rome	401–450	17 March	Man of God, Venerable Confessor; a.k.a. Alexius of Edessa
	Alypius of the Caves	c. 1114	17 August / Second Sunday of Great Lent	Venerable, Iconographer; a.k.a. Alipy
	Alypius the Stylite	640	26 November	Monastic founder, Stylite, Venerable, intercessor for the infertile, and a protector of children
	Alphaeus	33–100	26 May / 4 January	Apostle of the Seventy, father of the Apostles James and Matthew
	Alphaeus and Zacchaeus	303 / 304	18 November	Martyrs
	Ambrose Gudko	1918	9 August	Bishop of Sarapul and Yelabuga, Venerable Hieromartyr
	Ambrose of Milan	397	7 December	Church Father, Bishop of Milan, Venerable; who opposed Arianism
	Ambrose of Optina	1891	10 October	Venerable, Hieroschemamonk, one of the 14 Optina Elders
	Ambrosius of Georgia	1927	16 March	Catholicos-Patriarch of All Georgia, New Venerable Hieroconfessor
	Ammon of Egypt	356	4 October / 7 December	Desert Father, Venerable; a.k.a. Amun, Amoun, Ammonas and Ammonius the Hermit
	Ammon of Nitria	401–430	10 January	Desert Father, Venerable; a.k.a. Amtnonas, Ammonius and Ammonas of Egypt
	Amos	c. 787 BC	15 June	Prophet; who wrote the Book of Amos
	Amphian	c. 305	2 April	Martyr, disciple of St. Pamphilus
	Amphilochius of Iconium	394	23 November	Church Father, Bishop of Iconium, Venerable; who fought against Arianism and Macedonianism
	Amphilochius of Patmos	1970	16 April	Venerable Hieromonk, native name Amphilochios Makris
	Amphilochius of Pochayiv	1971	29 April	Venerable Wonderworker
	Ampliatus	33–100	31 October / 4 January	Apostle of the Seventy, Bishop of Diospolis, Hieromartyr; a.k.a. Amplias
	Anacletus	c. 91	26 April	Patriarch of Rome, Venerable Hieromartyr; a.k.a. Cletus
	Ananias of Damascus	33–100	1 October / 4 January	Apostle of the Seventy, Bishop of Damascus, Venerable Hieromartyr
	Anastasia of Russia	1918	17 July	Passion bearer; one of the Romanov Martyrs
	Anastasia of Serbia	1200	4 July [O.S. 21 June]	Right-Believing, Grand Princess consort of Serbia, Venerable, wife of Stefan Nemanja; native name Ana Vukanović
	Anastasius I of Rome	401	19 December	Patriarch of Rome, Venerable, father of St. Innocent I
	Anastasius II of Rome	498	8 September / 19 November	Patriarch of Rome, Venerable
	Anastasius of Persia	628	22 January	Venerable Martyr
	Anastasius of Sinai	685	20 April / Bright Wednesday	Abbot, Venerable
	Anathalon of Milan	33–100	24 September	Bishop of Milan and Brescia, Venerable, disciple of St. Barnabas, name also spelled Anatalius, Anatolius, Anatalone, Anatalo, and Anatolio
	Anatolius of Constantinople	458	3 July	Patriarch of Constantinople, Venerable; who condemned Eutyches and Dioscorus of Alexandria for Monophysitism
	Andrew of Constantinople	936	2 October	Fool for Christ, Blessed
	Andrew of Crete	712 / 726	4 July	Archbishop of Crete, Venerable, homilist, and hymnographer
	Andrew the Apostle	62	30 November / 30 June	Apostle, Martyr, the First-Called, the All-Praised
	Andrew the Commander	300	19 August	Martyr, Military Saint; a.k.a. Andrew the Tribune and Andrew Stratelates
	Andrew the Iconographer	1427–1430	29 January / 4 July	Venerable, Iconographer, native name Andrei Rublev
	Andrew the Martyr of Crete	766 / 767	17 October	Venerable Martyr, iconodule
	Andrew the Prince	1174	4 July	Right-Believing, Passion bearer, the Prince, native name Andrey Yuryevich Bogolyubsky
	Andronicus of Pannonia	33–100	17 May / 30 July / 4 January	Apostle of the Seventy, Bishop of Pannonia, Hieromartyr
	Angelina of Serbia	1520	14 July [O.S. 1 July] 12 August [O.S. 30 July] 23 December [O.S. 10 December]	Right-Believing, Despotess consort of Serbia, Venerable, wife of John Branković; surnamed Branković
	Anianus of Alexandria	82	25 April	Patriarch of Alexandria, Venerable, the first person to be converted by St. Mark the Evangelist
	Anicetus of Rome	166	17 April	Patriarch of Rome, Venerable Hieromartyr
	Anna of Kashin	1368	2 October / 21 July / 12 June	Right-Believing, Venerable, Princess of Kashin
	Anna of Novgorod	1050	10 February	Right-Believing, Princess of Novgorod, native name Ingegerd Olofsdotter
	Anna the Prophetess	1–100	3 February	Prophetess, Righteous
	Anne	1–80	25 July / 9 September / 9 December	Mother of the Virgin Mary, Righteous
	Anoub of Scetis	440–460	6 June	Desert Father, Venerable, a.k.a. Anoub the Anchorite and Anoub the Signbearer
	Ansgar	865	3 February	Apostle of the North, Archbishop of Hamburg-Bremen, Venerable; a.k.a. Oscar and Anskar/Anschar
	Antherus	236	5 August	Patriarch of Rome, Venerable Hieromartyr
	Anthimus of Nicomedia	303 / 311–312	3 September	Bishop of Nicomedia, Venerable Hieromartyr
	Anthony of Antioch	302	8 January	Hieromartyr
	Anthony of Kiev	1073	2 September	Venerable, founder of the monastic tradition in Kievan Rus'; a.k.a. Anthony of the Caves
	Anthony of Rome	1147	3 August / 17 January / First Friday after 29 June	Hegumen of Novgorod, Venerable; a.k.a. Anthony the Roman
	Anthony of Siya	1556	7 December	Hegumen of Siya Monastery, Venerable
	Anthony the Great	356	17 January	Father of Monasticism, Church Father, Venerable; a.k.a. Anthony of Egypt, Anthony the Abbot, Anthony of the Desert, Anthony the Anchorite, Anthony the Hermit, and Anthony of Thebes
	Antipas of Pergamum	68 / 92	11 April	Bishop of Pergamum, Venerable Hieromartyr, disciple of St. John the Apostle
	Antonina of Tismana	2011	23 December	Fool of Christ, Mother of Sfântul Cuvios Dometie
	Apelles of Heraklion	33–150	22 April / 10 September / 31 October / 4 January	Apostle of the Seventy, Bishop of Heraclea
	Aphrahat the Persian	c. 345	29 January	Church Father, Abbot, Venerable
	Apollinaris of Hierapolis	167–201	8 January	Church Father, Bishop of Hierapolis, Venerable; a.k.a. Apollinaris Claudius
	Apollinaris of Ravenna	33–100	23 July	Bishop of Ravenna, Venerable Hieromartyr
	Apollinaris of Valence	c. 520	5 October	Bishop of Valence, Venerable, brother of St. Avitus of Vienne
	Apollinaria of Egypt	470	5 January	Venerable
	Apollos	33–150	30 March / 8 December / 10 September / 4 January	Apostle of the Seventy, Bishop of Caesarea Maritima
	Aquila	33–100	14 July / 13 February / 4 January	Apostle of the Seventy, Bishop of Asia, Hieromartyr, husband of St. Priscilla
	Archippus	33–100	19 February / 22 November / 4 January	Apostle of the Seventy, Bishop of Laodicea, Hieromartyr
	Aredius of Gap	604	1 May	Bishop of Gap, Venerable
	Aredius of Limoges	591	25 August	Abbot, Venerable; a.k.a. Yrieix and Arède
	Aristarchus of Thessalonica	33–150	15 April / 27 September / 4 January	Apostle of the Seventy, Bishop of Apamea
	Aristides of Athens	120	13 September	Church Father, Martyr, the Athenian
	Aristobulus of Britannia	33–150	15 March / 16 March / 31 October / 4 January	Apostle of the Seventy, Bishop of Britain, possibly a Hieromartyr, brother of St. Barnabas
	Arsenios the Cappadocian	1924	28 October	Archimandrite, Venerable, spiritual father of St. Paisios
	Arsenius the Great	449 / 450	8 May	Church Father, Desert Father, Venerable, Hierodeacon, the Great; a.k.a. Arsenius of Scetis and Turah, Arsenius the Roman and Arsenius the Deacon
	Arsenie of Prislop	1989	28 November	Archmandrite, Venerable, native name Arsenie Boca
	Arsenius I the Syrmian	1266	10 November [O.S. 28 October]	2nd Archbishop of Serbia (r. 1233–1263), Venerable, disciple of St. Sava I
	Artemas of Lystra	33–150	30 October / 4 January	Apostle of the Seventy, Bishop of Lystra
	Asclepiades of Antioch	217	18 October	Patriarch of Antioch, Venerable Hieromartyr, name also spelled Aslipiades, Askelpiades and Asclepiades
	Asenath	c. 1750 BC – c. 1550 BC	Sunday of the Holy Forefathers	Fair, wife of Patriarch Joseph
	Asyncritus of Hyrcania	50–100	8 April / 4 January	Apostle of the Seventy, Bishop of Hyrcania, Hieromartyr; a.k.a. Asynkritos
	Athanasius of Alexandria	373	2 May / 18 January	Church Father, Patriarch of Alexandria, Venerable
	Athanasius of Attalia	1700	7 January	New Martyr
	Athanasius the Athonite	c. 1003	5 July	Church Father, Venerable; a.k.a. Athanasius of Mount Athos
	Athanasius I of Constantinople	1309	28 October	Ecumenical Patriarch of Constantinople, Venerable
	Athanasios Parios	1813	24 June / first Sunday of September	Venerable Hieromonk, hymnographer, one of the "Teachers of the [Greek] Nation" during the Modern Greek Enlightenment
	Athenagoras of Athens	c. 190	24 July	Church Father, Apologist, Venerable
	Atticus of Constantinople	425	8 January	Church Father, Archbishop of Constantinople, Venerable
	Augustine of Canterbury	c. 604	27 May	Apostle to the English, first Archbishop of Canterbury, Venerable
	Augustine of Hippo	430	15 June	Church Father, Bishop of Hippo, Venerable, Blessed
	Aurelius and Natalia	852	27 July	Martyrs; whose companions were George, Felix, and Liliosa; part of the 48 Martyrs of Córdoba
	Aurelius of Carthage	429	20 July	Church Father, Bishop of Carthage, Venerable, friend of St. Augustine
	Avilius of Alexandria	95	22 February	Patriarch of Alexandria, Venerable
	Avitus I of Clermont	c. 600	21 August	Bishop of Clermont, Venerable
	Avitus II of Clermont	689	21 February	Bishop of Clermont, Venerable
	Avitus of Vienne	c. 520	5 February	Church Father, Bishop of Vienne, Venerable, brother of St. Apollinaris of Valence
	Barachiel the Archangel	N/A (Note: According to Christian theology, angels do not die.)	8 November	Archangel
	Barbara of Heliopolis	c. 306	4 December	Great Martyr, Virgin Martyr
	Barbara Yakovleva	1918	18 July	New Venerable Martyr, native name Varvara
	Barbatus of Benevento	682	19 February	Bishop of Benevento, Venerable
	Barlaam of India	350–450	30 May / 19 November	Venerable Hermit; a.k.a. Bilawhar
	Barlaam of Kiev	1065	28 September / 19 November	Hegumen, Venerable
	Barnabas	c. 62	11 June / 4 January	Apostle of the Seventy, Bishop of Milan, Hieromartyr, companion of St. Paul, brother of St. Aristobulus
	Barnabas the New Confessor	1964	12 November [O.S. 30 October]	Titular Bishop of Hvosno, New Hieroconfessor; surnamed Nastić
	Barsanuphius the Great	c. 543	6 February	Desert Father, Venerable; author (together with St. John the Prophet) of over 800 letters giving spiritual direction that influenced Byzantine monasticism
	Bartholomew the Apostle	c. 70	11 June / 30 June	Apostle, Martyr
	Baruch	c. 600 BC – c. 501 BC	28 September	Prophet; who wrote the Book of Baruch; a.k.a. Baruch ben Neriah
	Basil of Ancyra	362	22 March	Hieromartyr; who fought against Arianism
	Basil of Ostrog	1671	12 May [O.S. 29 April]	Bishop of Zahumlje, Wonderworker, Venerable; who founded Ostrog Monastery
	Basil of Poiana Mărului	1767	25 April	Hegumen, Venerable, Hesychast, spiritual father of St. Paisius Velichkovsky
	Basil the Blessed	1552 / 1557	2 August	Fool for Christ, Blessed
	Basil the Great	379	1 January	Great Hierarch, Church Father, Cappadocian Father, Desert Father, Bishop of Caesarea, Venerable; an influential theologian who supported the Nicene Creed and fought against Arianism and Apollinarianism
	Basil the Layman of Ancyra	331–362	1 January	Martyr
	Bede of Jarrow	735	27 May	Church Father, Venerable, father of English history
	Benedict of Aniane	821	11 February	Venerable, monastic reformer
	Benedict of Nursia	543	14 March	Venerable, founder of the Benedictine Order and Western monasticism
	Benedict II of Rome	685	7 May	Patriarch of Rome, Venerable
	Benjamin of Nitria	c. 401 – c. 500	29 December	Desert Father, Venerable
	Benjamin of Petrograd	1922	31 July	Metropolitan of Petrograd and Gdov, New Venerable Hieromartyr
	Benjamin the Deacon	c. 424	13 October	Deacon, Hieromartyr; a.k.a. Benjamin the Deacon of Persia
	Bertharius of Monte Cassino	c. 884	22 October	Abbot of Monte Cassino, Venerable Martyr
	Bessarion the Great	401–500	6 June	Desert Father, Venerable Wonderworker; a.k.a. Bessarion of Egypt or Bessarion of Scetis
	Bessarion Sarai	1744	3 November [O.S. 21 October]	New Venerable Hieroconfessor, Hieromonk
	Birinus	649 / 650	3 December	Apostle to the West Saxons, Bishop of Genoa, Venerable
	Blaise of Sebaste	c. 316	11 February	Bishop of Sebaste, Venerable Hieromartyr
	Blandina Gobjilă	1971	24 May	Teacher who was brought to Siberia by Soviets
	Boethius	c. 521	7 December	Church Father, Martyr; full name Anicius Manlius Severinus Boethius, a.k.a. Buithe/Buite
	Boniface I of Rome	422	4 September	Patriarch of Rome, Venerable
	Boniface IV of Rome	615	25 May	Patriarch of Rome, Venerable
	Boniface of Mainz	754 / 755	5 June	Apostle to the Germans, Enlightener, Bishop of Mainz, Venerable Hieromartyr
	Boniface of Tarsus	c. 307	19 December	Martyr, romantic partner and slave of St. Aglaida
	Bonitus of Clermont	c. 710	15 January	Bishop of Clermont, Venerable
	Bonitus of Monte Cassino	c. 582	7 July	Abbot of Monte Cassino, Venerable
	Boris I of Bulgaria	907	2 May	King of Bulgaria, Equal-to-the-Apostles, the Baptiser
	Boris and Gleb	c. 1015 – c. 1019	24 July	Passion Bearers
	Branko of Veljun	1941	7 May [O.S. 24 April]	New Hieromartyr, parish priest of Veljun; surnamed Dobrosavljević
	Braulio of Zaragoza	651	26 March	Church Father, Bishop of Zaragoza, Venerable
	Brendan of Birr	c. 573	29 November	One of the Twelve Apostles of Ireland, Venerable
	Brendan the Navigator	575 / c. 583	16 May	One of the Twelve Apostles of Ireland, Venerable, the Navigator
	Bregowine of Canterbury	764	24 August	Archbishop of Canterbury, Venerable, name also spelled Bregwin/Bregwine
	Brigid of Kildare	525	1 February	Abbess, Venerable, the first Irish nun; a.k.a. Brigid of Ireland
	Bruno of Querfurt	1009	19 June / 15 October	Second Apostle to the Prussians, Bishop of Mersburg, Venerable Hieromartyr
	Budimir of Dobrun	1945	11 July [O.S. 28 June]	New Hieromartyr, one of the New Martyrs of Dabro-Bosnia and Mileševa; surnamed Sokolović
	Caesar of Dyrrhachium	33–150	30 March / 8 December / 4 January	Apostle of the Seventy, Bishop of Dyrrhachium
	Caesaria the Younger	c. 530	12 January	Abbess of Abbey of St Caesarius, Venerable, sister of St. Caesarius of Arles
	Caesarius of Arles	543	27 August	Church Father, Bishop of Arles, Venerable, brother of St. Caesaria
	Caesarius of Nazianzus	368 / 369	9 March	Doctor, brother of St. Gregory of Nazianzus
	Caesarius of Terracina	c. 201 – c. 300	1 November	Deacon, Hieromartyr
	Caius of Milan	33–100	27 September	Bishop of Milan, Venerable; a.k.a. Gaius
	Caius of Rome	296	22 April	Patriarch of Rome, Venerable Hieromartyr; a.k.a. Gaius
	Caleb	c. 1500 BC	Sunday of the Holy Forefathers	Righteous
	Callinicus I of Constantinople	705	23 August	Ecumenical Patriarch of Constantinople, Venerable
	Callistratus of Carthage	303–311	27 September	Martyr, the Soldier, name also spelled Kallistratos
	Callistratus of Timișeni and Vasiova	1975	10 May	Monk
	Callistus I of Constantinople	1363	20 June	Ecumenical Patriarch of Constantinople, Venerable
	Callistus I of Rome	222	14 October	Patriarch of Rome, Venerable Hieromartyr; a.k.a. Callixtus I
	Carpus of Beroea	33–150	26 May / 4 January	Apostle of the Seventy, Bishop of Beroea
	Castinus of Byzantium	237	25 January	Bishop of Byzantium, Venerable
	Catherine of Alexandria	c. 305	24 November / 25 November	Great Martyr, Virgin Martyr; a.k.a. Katherine
	Celestine I of Rome	432	8 April	Patriarch of Rome, Venerable
	Cephas of Iconium	33–150	30 March / 8 December / 4 January	Apostle of the Seventy, Bishop of Iconium
	Chad of Mercia	673	2 March	Apostle to the Mercians, Bishop of Mercia and York, Abbot, Venerable Wonderworker
	Charitina of Amisus	304	5 October	Virgin Martyr
	Charitina of Lithuania	1281	5 October	Hegumenia, Venerable, Princess of Lithuania
	Chariton the Confessor	350	28 September	Desert Father, Abbot, Venerable Confessor
	Christopher of Lycia	250	9 May	Martyr
	Christopher of Trebizond	668	18 August	Abbot of Sumela Monastery, Venerable
	Chrysostomos Papasarantopoulos	1972	29 December	Missionary to Africa
	Clement of Ohrid	960	27 July / 22 November / 25 November	Equal-to-the-Apostles, Bishop of Greater Macedonia, Venerable, disciple of Saints Cyril and Methodius, one of the 7 Apostles of Bulgaria
	Clement of Rome	c. 101	25 November / 22 April / 10 September	Patriarch of Rome, Venerable, Apostolic Father, Hieromartyr
	Clement of Sardice	33–100	22 April / 10 September / 4 January	Apostle of the Seventy, Bishop of Sardis
	Cleopas of Emmaus	33–150	30 October / 4 January	Apostle of the Seventy, brother of St. Joseph, name also spelled as Cleophas
	Cleopas of Sihăstria	1998	2 December	Hegumen, Venerable, native name Cleopa Ilie
	Cloud of Paris	c. 560	7 September	Abbot, Venerable, the Ascetic; a.k.a. Clodoald
	Columba of Iona	597	9 June	Apostle of the Picts, Church Father, Abbot, Venerable; a.k.a. Colmcille
	Columbanus	615	23 November	Venerable Missionary
	Columbanus the Younger			
	Constantine Brâncoveanu	1714	16 August	Prince of Wallachia, Martyr
	Constantine of Murom	1129	21 May	Right-Believing, Venerable Wonderworker of Murom; a.k.a. Constantine the Blessed
	Constantine the Great	337	21 May	Equal-to-the-Apostles, Roman Emperor, the Great; who first legalised Christianity in the Roman Empire
	Constantine Sârbu	1975	23 October	Holy Hieromartyr; native name Constantin Sârbu
	Constantine the Younger	685	3 September	Right-Believing, Emperor; a.k.a. Constantine IV
	Cornelius of Rome	253	16 September	Patriarch of Rome, Venerable Hieromartyr
	Cosmas and Damian of Cilicia	303–313	17 October	Holy Unmercenaries, Martyrs; brothers who were martyred with their brothers Leontius, Anthimus, and Eutropius; a.k.a. Cosmas and Damian of Arabia
	Cosmas and Damian of Mesopotamia	c. 287	1 November	Holy Unmercenaries, Wonderworkers, Martyrs, twin sons of St. Theodota; a.k.a. Cosmas and Damian of Asia Minor
	Cosmas and Damian of Rome	283–285	1 July	Holy Unmercenaries, Wonderworkers, Martyrs, brothers
	Cosmas of Aetolia	1779	24 August	Equal-to-the-Apostles, Hieromonk, New Venerable Hieromartyr, the Aetolian; a.k.a. Kosmas
	Cosmas I of Constantinople	1081	2 January	Ecumenical Patriarch of Constantinople, Venerable Wonderworker, a.k.a. Cosmas I the Jerusalemite
	Cosmas of Maiuma	701–800	12 October / 14 October	Bishop of Maiuma, Venerable, the Hymnographer
	Credan	c. 780	19 August	Abbot of Evesham Abbey, Venerable
	Crescentian of Sardinia	c. 130	31 May	Martyr
	Crescentian, Victor, Rosula and Generalis	c. 258	14 September	Martyrs
	Crescentiana of Rome	401–500	5 May	Martyr
	Crescentinus	c. 287 / 303	1 June	Martyr, Military Saint
	Crescentius of Florence	c. 396	19 April	Subdeacon, disiciple of St. Zenobius and St. Ambrose
	Crescentius of Rome	300	14 September	Child Martyr, son of St. Euthymius of Perugia
	Crispin and Crispinian	c. 285	25 October	Martyrs; the patron saints of shoemakers
	Crispin of Pavia	c. 466	7 January	Bishop of Pavia, Venerable; who signed the acts of the Council of Milan
	Crispina	304	5 December	Martyr
	Crispus, Crispinianus, and Benedicta	362	27 June	Martyrs
	Cristiolus	501–600	3 November	Founder of various churches in Wales; son of St. Hywel and brother of St. Sulien
	Crescens of Galatia	98–117	30 July / 4 January	Apostle of the Seventy, Bishop of Galatia, Hieromartyr; a.k.a. Criscus
	Crispus of Chalcedon	33–120	4 October / 4 January	Apostle of the Seventy, Bishop of Chalcedon, Hieromartyr
	Cuthbert of Canterbury	761	26 October	Archbishop of Canterbury, Bishop of Hereford, Venerable
	Cuthbert of Lindisfarne	687	20 March	Bishop of Lindisfarne, Venerable
	Cyprian of Carthage	258	31 August	Church Father, Bishop of Carthage, Venerable Hieromartyr
	Cyprian of Kiev	1406	27 May / 16 September	Metropolitan of Kiev and all Rus', Venerable
	Cyriacus	304	7 June	Deacon, Hieromartyr; who was martyred 23 others, including Largus, Smaragdus, Crescentianus, Memmia and Juliana; a.k.a. Cyriac
	Cyriacus the Anchorite	557	29 September	Venerable hermit and anchorite, name also spelled Kyriakos
	Cyril the Philosopher	869	11 May	Equal-to-the-Apostles, Teacher and Enlightener of the Slavs, Hieroconfessor, brother of St. Methodius
	Cyril Lucaris	1638	27 June	Ecumenical Patriarch of Constantinople, Venerable
	Cyril of Alexandria	444	9 June	Patriarch of Alexandria, Venerable, who opposed Nestorianism at the Council of Ephesus
	Cyril of Beloozero	1427	9 June	Hegumen, Venerable, disciple of St. Sergius of Radonezh
	Cyril of Jerusalem	386	18 March	Patriarch of Jerusalem, Venerable Hieroconfessor
	Cyril I of Serbia	1418 / 1419	12 September [O.S. 30 August]	8th Patriarch of Serbia (r. 1407–1419), Venerable
	Cyril of Turov	1182	28 April	Bishop of Turov, Venerable; a.k.a. Kirill of Turov
	Damaris of Athens	52–150	2 October / 3 October	First female Athenian convert to Christianity, disciple of St. Paul and St. Dionysius the Areopagite
	Damasus I	384	11 December	Patriarch of Rome, Venerable; who opposed the heresies of Macedonianism and Apollinarianism
	Damian of Grahovo	1941	13 June [O.S. 31 May] First Saturday after Elijah's day	New Hieromartyr; surnamed Štrbac
	Daniel	c. 539 BC	Sunday of the Holy Forefathers	Prophet; who wrote the Book of Daniel; who was given the pagan name Belteshazzar
	Daniel the Hesychast	1488	18 December	Venerable Wonderworker, Hesychast, spiritual father of St. Stephen the Great
	Daniel of Katounakia	1929	7 September	Venerable, Athonite monk; a.k.a. Daniel Katounakiotis of Smyrna
	Daniel of Moscow	1303	4 March	Right-Believing, Prince of Moscow
	Daniel of Padua	168	3 January	Bishop of Padua, Venerable Hieromartyr
	Daniel II of Serbia	1337	2 January [O.S. 20 December]	11th Archbishop of Serbia (r. 1324–1337), Venerable; who wrote many hagiographies of Serbian saints
	David	c. 1000 BC	Sunday of the Holy Forefathers	Prophet, King of Israel; who wrote 73 of the Psalms
	David of Gareji	501–700	7 May	Venerable Wonderworker, one of the thirteen Assyrian Apostles
	David IV of Georgia	1125	26 January	Right-Believing, Blessed, King of Georgia
	David of Serbia	1286	7 October [O.S. 24 September]	Venerable, who founded the Davidovica Monastery; birth name Dmitar Nemanjić
	David of Thessalonica	540	26 June	Venerable, the Tree-Dweller
	David of Wales	c. 600	1 March	Bishop of Mynyw (St Davids), Venerable; a.k.a. Dewi
	Declán of Ardmore	450–500	24 July	Bishop of Ardmore, Venerable, disciple of St. Colman; who converted the Déisi; name also spelled Déclán
	Demetrius of the Don	1389	19 May	Right-Believing, Grand Prince of Moscow; widely known as Dmitry Donskoy
	Demetrius of Sirmium	304 / 306	9 April	Martyr
	Demetrius of Rostov	1709	28 October	Metropolitan of Rostov, Venerable
	Demetrius of Thessaloniki	306	26 October	Great Martyr, the Myrrh-Streaming
	Demetrius Stăniloae	1993	4 October	New Hieroconfessor, native name Dumitru Stăniloae
	Denis of Paris	250	9 October	Bishop of Paris, Venerable Hieromartyr
	Deusdedit of Canterbury	664	14 January	Archbishop of Canterbury, Venerable
	Dimitri Gagastathis	1975	16 January	Priest
	Diomedes of Tarsus	284–305	16 August	Unmercenary Healer, Martyr
	Dionisie Ignat	2004	11 May	Monk
	Dionysius the Areopagite	64–100	3 October	Bishop of Athens, Venerable Hieromartyr
	Dionysius of Corinth	c. 180	29 November	Bishop of Corinth, Venerable Hieromartyr
	Dionysius Exiguus	c. 544	1 September	Venerable, writer and canonist who invented AD dating
	Dionysius the Great	264	5 October	Patriarch of Alexandria, Venerable
	Dionysius of Rome	268	26 December	Patriarch of Rome, Venerable Hieromartyr
	Dismas	c. 29	Good Friday	The Penitent Thief, who was forgiven his sins by Jesus whilst they were being crucified
	Dometius the Merciful of Râmeț	1975	6 July	Native name Dometie Manolache
	Dorotheus of Gaza	c. 565	18 June	Hegumen, Venerable
	Dorothy of Kashin	1549	24 September	Venerable
	Dositheus of Zagreb	1945	13 January [O.S. 31 December]	Metropolitan of Zagreb, New Venerable Hieroconfessor; surnamed Vasić
	Dunstan of Canterbury	988	19 May	Archbishop of Canterbury, Bishop of London, Bishop of Worcester, Abbot of Glastonbury Abbey, Venerable
	Dymphna of Ireland	601–700	15 May	Virgin Martyr, Lily of Éire
	Eadsige of Canterbury	1050	28 October	Archbishop of Canterbury, Venerable, Benedictine monk; a.k.a. Edsige, Eadsimus and Eadsin
	Edith of Wilton	984	16 September	Venerable, daughter of St. Wilfrida
	Edmund the Martyr	869	20 November	King of East Anglia, Martyr
	Edward the Martyr	979	18 March	King of England, Martyr
	Edwin of Northumbria	633	12 October	King of Deira and Bernicia, Martyr
	Egbert of Northumbria	729	24 April	Venerable
	Ekvtime Takaishvili	1953	3 January	Man of God
	Eleazar the Martyr	178–161 BC	1 August	Martyr, teacher of the 7 Maccabean Martyrs
	Eleazar the High Priest	c. 1250 BC – c. 1100 BC	2 September	High Priest, son of Prophet Aaron
	Elias the Hermit	301–400	8 January	Desert Father, Venerable, the Hermit; a.k.a. Elias of Egypt
	Elisabeta Lazar of Pasărea	2014	5 June	Virgin, sister of Pasarea Monastery
	Elesbaan	553–555	24 October	Blessed, King of Ethiopia; a.k.a. Kaleb of Axum
	Eleutherius of Illyria	120	15 December	Bishop of Illyria, Venerable Hieromartyr
	Eleutherius of Nicomedia	303	2 October	Martyr
	Eleutherius of Rome	189	26 May	Patriarch of Rome, Venerable Hieromartyr
	Eleutherius of Tournai	c. 532	20 February	Bishop of Tournai, Venerable; who fought against Arianism
	Eligius of Noyon	659 / 660	1 December	Bishop of Noyon, Venerable Hieroconfessor; who founded the monastery of Solignac; a.k.a. Eloi/Eloy
	Elijah	c. 900 BC	20 July	Prophet, who is prophesied to be one of the two witnesses along with Prophet Enoch as described in Revelation 11:1–14; a.k.a. Elias
	Elijah Lăcătușu	1983	22 July	New Confessor, Priest; native name a.k.a. Ilie Lăcătușu
	Elijah the Righteous	1907	20 July	Righteous, Martyr; native name a.k.a. Ilia Chavchavadze
	Elisha	c. 900 BC	14 June	Prophet
	Elizabeth	5–50	5 September	Righteous, mother of St. John the Baptist
	Elizabeth the New Martyr	1918	5 July	Princess of Hesse, New Venerable Martyr
	Emmelia of Caesarea	375	30 May / 1 January	Mother of Saints Basil of Caesarea, Macrina the Younger, Peter of Sebaste, Gregory of Nyssa, and Naucratius; a.k.a. Emilia and Emily
	Emerentiana	c. 305	23 January	Martyr
	Enoch	1487 AM	30 July / Sunday of the Holy Forefathers	Patriarch, Prophet; who is prophesied to be one of the two witnesses along with Prophet Elijah as described in Revelation 11:1–14
	Enos	c. 3769 BC	Sunday of the Holy Forefathers	Patriarch, Righteous; a.k.a. Enosh
	Epaphras of Colossae	33–100	22 November / 4 January	Apostle of the Seventy, Martyr
	Epaphroditus	33–150	30 March / 8 December / 4 January	Apostle of the Seventy, Bishop of Adrianium
	Epenetus of Carthage	64	30 July / 4 January	Apostle of the Seventy, Bishop of Carthage, Hieromartyr
	Ephraim of Antioch	545	8 June	Patriarch of Antioch, Venerable
	Ephraim of Katounakia	1998	27 February	Venerable, Athonite elder
	Ephraim of Nea Makri	1426	5 May / 3 January	New Hieromartyr, Newly-Revealed
	Ephraim of Pereyaslavl	1098	28 January	Metropolitan of Kiev and All Rus', Bishop of Pereiaslav, Venerable; a.k.a. Ephraim of the Caves
	Ephraim of Serbia	1400	28 June [O.S. 15 June]	3rd Patriarch of Serbia (r. 1375–1379, 1389–1392), Venerable
	Ephraim the Syrian	373	28 January	Desert Father, Venerable Hieroconfessor, Deacon, Hymnographer; a.k.a. Ephrem and Ephraim of Edessa
	Epiphanius of Pavia	497	21 January	Bishop of Pavia, Venerable
	Epiphanius of Salamis	403	12 May	Church Father, Desert Father, Archbishop of Cyprus, Venerable
	Epiphanius the Wise	c. 1420	23 May	Venerable, disciple of St. Sergius of Radonezh
	Erastus of Paneas	33–150	10 November / 4 January	Apostle of the Seventy, Deacon
	Esther	c. 500 BC – c. 301 BC	Sunday of the Holy Forefathers	Righteous, Queen of Persia
	Etheldreda of Ely	679	23 June	Abbess, Venerable, East Anglian princess; a.k.a. Audrey
	Eucherius of Lyon	449	16 November	Church Father, Archbishop of Lyon, Venerable
	Eucherius of Orléans	743	20 February	Bishop of Orléans, Venerable
	Eudokia of Heliopolis	107	1 March	Venerable Martyr
	Eudokia of Persia	201–300	4 August	Martyr
	Eugene I of Rome	657	2 June	Patriarch of Rome, Venerable
	Eugippius	c. 535	15 January	Church Father, Abbot, Venerable, disciple of St. Severinus, name also written as Eugyppius
	Eulalia of Barcelona	c. 304	12 February	Virgin Martyr
	Eulalia of Mérida	c. 304	10 December	Virgin Martyr
	Eulogius of Alexandria	607 / 608	13 February	Patriarch of Alexandria, Venerable Hieroconfessor
	Euphrosyne of Alexandria	470	25 September / 15 February	Venerable
	Euphrosyne of Moscow	1407	7 July / 17 May	Venerable, Grand Princess of Moscow, secular name Eudoxia of Moscow
	Euphrosyne of Polotsk	1173	23 May	Hegumenia, Venerable
	Euphrosynus of Palestine	801–900	11 September	Venerable; a.k.a. Euphrosynus the Cook
	Euphrosynus of Pskov	1481	15 May	Hegumen of the Pskov-Caves Monastery, Venerable
	Euprepius of Verona	33–100	21 August	Bishop of Verona, Venerable
	Eusebius of Milan	465	12 August	Bishop of Milan, Venerable; who opposed Eutychianism
	Eusebius of Rome	310	17 August	Patriarch of Rome, Venerable Hieroconfessor
	Eusebius of Vercelli	371	2 August	Church Father, Bishop of Vercelli, Venerable; who was exiled for opposing Arianism
	Eustathius I of Serbia	1286	17 January [O.S. 4 January]	6th Archbishop of Serbia (r. 1279–1286), Venerable
	Eustathius II of Serbia	1309	29 August [O.S. 16 August]	8th Archbishop of Serbia (r. 1292–1309), Venerable; who established seven new eparchies
	Eutychian of Rome	283	7 December	Patriarch of Rome, Venerable
	Euthymius the Athonite	c. 1024	13 May	Venerable, Athonite monk; a.k.a. Euthymius of Athos
	Euthymius of Dečani	1501–1600	24 November [O.S. 11 November]	Venerable Martyr
	Euthymius the Great	473	20 January	Desert Father, Hegumen, Venerable, the Great
	Euthymius II of Novgorod	1458	11 March	Archbishop of Novgorod, Venerable
	Euthymius of Perugia	301–400	29 August	Father of St. Crescentius
	Euthymius of Sardis	831	26 December / 8 March	Bishop of Sardis, Venerable Hieromartyr and Hieroconfessor
	Euthymius of Tarnovo	c. 1404	20 January	Patriarch of Bulgaria, Venerable
	Euthymius the Younger	898	15 October	Venerable, Athonite monk; a.k.a. Euthymius of Thessalonica and Euthymius the New
	Evaristus	c. 105	26 October	Patriarch of Rome, Venerable Hieromartyr
	Eve	Before the Great Flood	Sunday of the Holy Forefathers / Forgiveness Sunday	Foremother, Righteous, the Proto-Created, the first woman
	Evodius of Antioch	66	7 September / 4 January	Apostle of the Seventy, Patriarch of Antioch, Hieromartyr; a.k.a. Eudius/Eudias
	Ewald the Black	c. 695	3 October	Missionary, Venerable Hieromartyr, Hieromonk, Missionary, brother of St. Ewald the White; a.k.a. Ewald the Dark
	Ewald the White	c. 695	3 October	Missionary, Venerable Hieromartyr, Hieromonk, brother of St. Ewald the Black; a.k.a. Ewald the Fair
	Ezekiel	c. 570 BC	21 July	Prophet; who wrote the Book of Ezekiel; a.k.a. Ezechiel
	Ezra	c. 440 BC – c. 400 BC	Sunday of the Holy Forefathers	Prophet, High Priest; who wrote the Book of Ezra and Books of Chronicles; a.k.a. Esdras
	Fabian of Rome	250	5 August	Patriarch of Rome, Venerable Hieromartyr
	Fabiola of Rome	399	27 December	Venerable, Ascetic; a divorcee who married again before the death of her first husband and later repented
	Fabius of Caesarea	300	31 July	Martyr, Military Saint; who was martyred for refusing to bear an idolatrous standard
	Fabrician and Philibert	201–300	22 August	Martyrs
	Faith of Conques	287	6 October	Virgin Martyr; a.k.a. Foy and Fides
	Faith, Hope, and Charity	c. 137	17 September	Virgin Martyrs, daughters of St. Sophia of Milan; the latter saint a.k.a. Love
	Felix I	274	30 May	Patriarch of Rome, Venerable Hieromartyr
	Felix III	492	1 March	Patriarch of Rome, Venerable
	Felix IV	530	30 January	Patriarch of Rome, Venerable
	Fevronia of Murom	1228	25 June	Princess of Murom, Right-Believing, Wonderworker, wife of St. Peter of Murom
	Firmilian of Caesarea	c. 269	28 October	Church Father, Bishop of Caesarea, Venerable
	Filotimia Manolache	1989	6 July	Nun, and mother of Saint Dometius the Merciful
	Flavian of Constantinople	449	18 February	Archbishop of Constantinople, Venerable Hieromartyr or Hieroconfessor
	Florentina of Cartagena	c. 612	20 June	Abbess, Venerable, sister of Saints Isidore and Leander of Seville and Fulgentius of Cartagena; a.k.a. Florence
	Fortunatus of the Seventy	33–120	15 June / 4 January	Apostle of the Seventy, companion of St. Achaicus of Corinth
	Fortunatus of Spoleto	c. 400	1 June	Priest known for his love for the poor
	Fortunatus of Todi	537	14 October	Bishop of Todi, Venerable
	Fructus	c. 715	25 October	Venerable
	Frideswide	c. 735	19 October	Abbess, Venerable, English princess; a.k.a. Frithuswith
	Fulgentius of Cartagena	c. 633	16 January	Bishop of Écija, Venerable, brother of Saints Isidore and Leander of Seville
	Fulgentius of Ruspe	532	1 January	Church Father, Bishop of Ruspe, Abbot, Venerable
	Theodore the Admiral	1817	2 October / 23 July	Righteous, Military Saint, considered one of the greatest admirals in history; native name Fyodor Ushakov
	Gabriel the Archangel	N/A (Note: According to Christian theology, angels do not die.)	26 March / 13 July / 8 November	Archangel, Taxiarch
	Gabriel II of Constantinople	1659	3 December	Ecumenical Patriarch of Constantinople, Metropolitan of Prousa, New Venerable Hieromartyr
	Gabriel of Białystok	1690	20 April	Child Martyr
	Gabriel of Georgia	1995	2 November	Fool for Christ, Venerable Wonderworker, Hieroconfessor, Archimandrite
	Gabriel of Lesnovo	1050–1100	15 January	Venerable, founder of Lesnovo Monastery
	Gabriel I of Serbia	1659	26 December [O.S. 13 December]	22nd Patriarch of Serbia (r. 1648–1655), Venerable Hieromartyr; surnamed Rajić
	Gaius of Ephesus	33–150	5 November / 4 January	Apostle of the Seventy, Bishop of Ephesus
	Gal I of Clermont	554	1 July	Bishop of Clermont, Venerable; a.k.a. Gall
	Gall of Switzerland	c. 645	16 October	Apostle of Switzerland, Venerable, disciple of St. Columbanus
	Gamaliel the Rabban	40–100	2 August	Righteous; a pharisee who taught St. Paul the Mosaic Law and later converted to Christianity
	Gelasius I of Rome	496	21 November	Patriarch of Rome, Venerable; who fought against Monophysitism
	Gelasius of Nilopolis	401–500	31 December	Desert Father, Venerable
	Geminian of Modena	348	31 January	Bishop of Modena, Venerable; who fought against Arianism and Jovinianism
	Genevieve of Paris	512	21 November	Virgin
	Gennadius of Constantinople	471	31 August	Patriarch of Constantinople, Venerable
	Gennadius of Novgorod	1505	4 December	Archbishop of Novgorod, Venerable; who fought against the Heresy of the Judaizers; a.k.a. Gennady
	Gennadius Scholarius	1464	25 August	Ecumenical Patriarch of Constantinople, Venerable; the first one after the Fall of Constantinople
	George of Amastris	825	21 February	Bishop of Amastris, Venerable
	George of Slavonia	1941	17 July [O.S. 4 July]	New Hieromartyr; native name Đorđe Bogić
	George of Chqondidi	1118	12 September	Archbishop of Chqondidi, Venerable; who advised St. David IV
	George the Confessor	814	19 April	Bishop of Antioch of Pisidia, Venerable Hieroconfessor; a.k.a. George of Antioch
	George of Drama	1959	24 October	New Venerable Hieroconfessor, Righteous, native name Georgios Karslidis
	George the Hagiorite	1065	27 June	Hegumen of Iviron Monastery, Venerable
	George of Kratovo	1515	11 February / 26 May	New Martyr; a.k.a. George the New of Sofia
	George of Lodève	c. 884	19 February	Venerable
	George of Lydda	303	23 April	Great Martyr, Trophy-Bearer, Victory-Bearer, Wonderworker
	George of Mogilev	1795	12 February / Third Sunday after Pentecost	Archbishop of Mogilev, Venerable
	George the Standard-Bearer	821	7 April	Archbishop of Mytilene, Venerable Hieroconfessor, iconodule
	George II of Vladimir	1238	4 February	Grand Prince of Vladimir, Martyr; a.k.a. Georgy II Vsevolodovich and Yuri II of Vladimir
	George of Vienne	c. 670 / c. 699	2 November	Archbishop of Vienne, Venerable
	Georgia of Clermont	c. 500	15 February	Venerable anchoress
	Georgy Kossov	1928	8 September / 9 December	Priest, Starets, Hieroconfessor; a.k.a. Yegor Chekryakovsky
	Gerasimus II of Alexandria	1714	15 January	Patriarch of Alexandria (r. 1688–1710), Venerable; a.k.a. Gerasimos Palladas
	Gerasimus of the Jordan	451	4 March	Hegumen, Venerable, name also spelled Gerasimos and Gerasim
	Gerasimus of Vologda	1178	4 March	Venerable Wonderworker; a.k.a. Herasmus
	Gervasios of Patras	1964	30 June	Venerable Hieromonk, native name Gervasios Paraskevopoulos
	Ghislain	680	9 October	Abbot, Venerable Confessor, anchorite
	Gideon	c. 1200 BC – c. 1101 BC	26 November	Judge, Righteous
	Gobnait	601–721	11 February	Abbess, Venerable, monastic foundress; a.k.a. Gobnat, Mo Gobnat, Abigail and Deborah
	Godehard of Hildesheim	1038	4 May	Bishop of Hildesheim, Venerable
	Gorazd of Moravia	885–900	27 July	Bishop of Moravia, Venerable, one of the 7 Apostles of Bulgaria, disciple of Saints Cyril and Methodius
	Gorazd of Prague	1942	22 August	Metropolitan of the Czech Lands and Slovakia, Bishop of Prague, New Venerable Hieromartyr; a.k.a. Gorazd Pavlík
	Gordius	320	3 January	Martyr; a.k.a. Gordinus
	Gorgonia	370	23 February	Righteous, sister of St. Gregory of Nazianzus
	Gobron	914	17 November	Martyr, Military Saint
	Gorgonius of Nicomedia	304	3 September	Martyr
	Gregory V of Constantinople	1821	10 April	Ecumenical Patriarch of Constantinople, Venerable Hieromartyr, Ethnomartyr
	Gregory of Agrigento	638	23 November	Bishop of Agrigento, Venerable
	Gregory of Decapolis	816	20 November	Venerable Wonderworker; a.k.a. Gregory the Decapolite
	Gregory of Gornjak	c. 1406	20 December [O.S. 7 December]	Venerable, Hesychast; a.k.a. Gregory the Younger, Gregory the Hesychast and Gregory the Silent
	Gregory of Khandzta	861	5 October	Venerable Hieromonk; who founded many monasteries
	Gregory of Nazianzus	390	25 January	Theologian, Cappadocian Father, Desert Father, Archbishop of Constantinople, Venerable
	Gregory of Nazianzus the Elder	374	1 January	Bishop of Nazianzus, Venerable, father of St. Gregory of Nazianzus
	Gregory of Neocaesarea	270	17 November	Church Father, Bishop of Neocaesarea, Venerable Wonderworker; a.k.a. Gregory Thaumaturgus
	Gregory of Nyssa	394	10 January	Theologian, Cappadocian Father, Bishop of Nyssa, Venerable
	Gregory II of Ras	1321	12 September [O.S. 30 August]	Bishop of Raška, Venerable; a monk-scribe who transcribed the nomocanon Raška krmčija
	Gregory of Sinai	1346	11 February / 6 April / 8 August / 27 November	Venerable
	Gregory of Tours	594	17 November	Church Father, Bishop of Tours, Venerable
	Gregory Palamas	1359	14 November	Church Father, Pillar of Orthodoxy, Archbishop of Thessalonica, Venerable; who defended hesychasm
	Gregory I of Rome	604	12 March	Patriarch of Rome, Venerable, a.k.a. Gregory the Great and Gregory the Dialogist
	Gregory II of Rome	731	11 February	Patriarch of Rome, Venerable
	Gregory III of Rome	741	10 December	Patriarch of Rome, Venerable
	Gregory the Illuminator	332	30 September	Enlightener of Armenia, Equal-to-the-Apostles, Bishop of Armenia, Venerable Hieromartyr
	Grigol Peradze	1942	6 December	Archimandrite, New Venerable Hieromartyr

== See also ==
- List of Eastern Orthodox saint titles
- List of saints in the Russian Orthodox Church
- List of saints of the Serbian Orthodox Church
- List of American Orthodox saints
