= List of Eastern Orthodox saints (T–Z) =

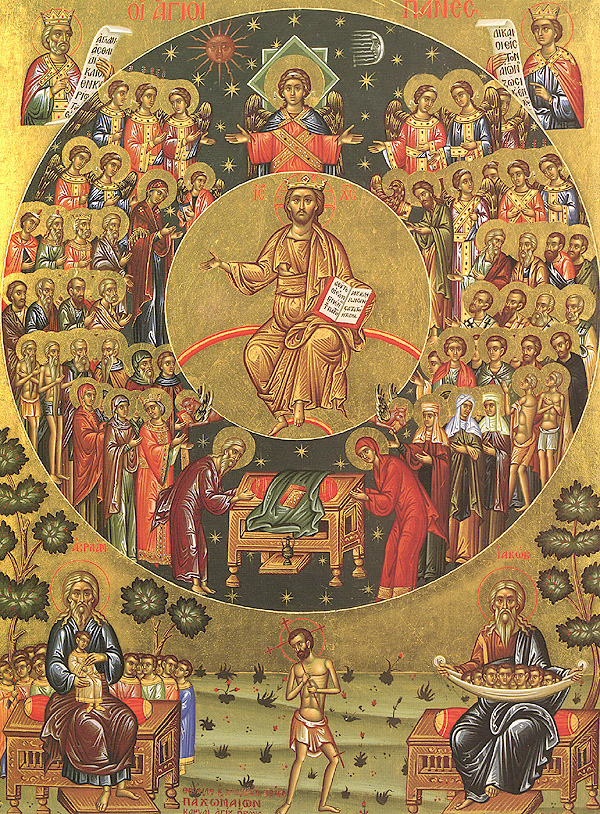
Icon depicting the Synaxis of All Saints; various saints can be identified by their saint attributes, such as Patriarch Abraham (bottom left, silver hair) or Patriarch Jacob (bottom right, seated)

This is a partial list of canonised saints in the Eastern Orthodox Church.

In Eastern Orthodoxy, a saint is defined as anyone who is in heaven, whether recognised here on earth, or not. By this definition, Adam and Eve, Moses, the various prophets, and archangels are all given the title of Saint. Sainthood in the Orthodox Church does not necessarily reflect a moral model, but communion with God; there are many examples of people who lived in great sin and became saints by humility and repentance: Saints Mary of Egypt, Moses the Ethiopian, and Dismas, the repentant thief who was crucified with Jesus Christ. Therefore, a more complete Orthodox definition of what a saint is, has to do with the way that saints, through their humility and their love of mankind, saved inside them the entire Church, and loved all people.

Orthodox belief states that God reveals saints through answered prayers and other miracles. Saints are usually recognised by their local community, often by people who directly knew them. As their popularity grows they are often then recognised by the entire Church through the Holy Spirit. The word canonisation means that a Christian has been found worthy to have his name placed in the canon (official list) of saints of the Church. The formal process of recognition involves deliberation by a synod of bishops. Evidence of a virtuous life and prior local veneration of the saint are required for canonization.

Because the Church shows no true distinction between the living and the dead, as the saints are considered to be alive in heaven, saints are referred to as if they are still alive, and are venerated, not worshipped. They are believed to be able to intercede for the living for salvation or other requests and help mankind either through direct communion with God or by personal intervention.

== List ==
Some saints listed may also be a part of a larger group of saints also listed (particularly martyrs, such as Saint Laura of Córdoba and the Martyrs of Córdoba).

Image	Saint	Died (Year)	Feast Day (NS/OS)	Notes
	Tarasius of Constantinople	806	25 February	Ecumenical Patriarch of Constantinople, Venerable Hieroconfessor, name also spelled Tarasios
	Tatiana of Russia	1918	17 July	Passion bearer; one of the Romanov Martyrs
	Telesphorus of Rome	c. 138	22 February	Patriarch of Rome, Venerable Hieromartyr
	Tertius of Iconium	33–100	30 October / 10 November / 4 January	Apostle of the Seventy, Bishop of Iconium, Hieromartyr
	Thaddeus of Edessa	44	21 August / 4 January	Apostle of the Seventy; a.k.a. Addai
	Theoctistus of Serbia	1316	12 November [O.S. 30 October]	King of Serbia, Venerable; regnal name Stefan Dragutin
	Theodora of Sihla	1665–1770	7 August	Venerable
	Theodora (wife of Justinian I)	548	14 November	Right-Believing, Byzantine Empress, wife of St. Justinian I
	Theodora (wife of Theophilos)	c. 867	11 February	Right-Believing, Righteous, Byzantine Empress and Regent, Restorer of Orthodoxy, wife of the last iconoclast emperor Theophilos; who restored the veneration of icons after her husband's death
	Theodore I of Alexandria	609	3 December	Patriarch of Alexandria, Venerable Hieromartyr
	Theodore of Amasea	306	17 February	Great Martyr, the Recruit, Military Saint; a.k.a. Theodore Tyron/Tiron
	Theodore of Heraclea	319	8 February	Great Martyr, the General, Military Saint; a.k.a. Theodore Stratelates
	Theodore of Komogovo	1788	First Saturday of Great Lent (Theodore's Saturday)	Venerable Martyr; surnamed Sladić
	Theodore of Marseille	594	26 December	Bishop of Marseille, the Sacrist, Venerable
	Theodore of Octodurum	301–400	17 August	Bishop of Octodurum and Valais, Venerable; a.k.a. Theodolus, Theodulus and Yoder/Joder
	Theodore of Pavia	778	20 May	Bishop of Pavia, Venerable
	Theodore, Philippa and companions	220	19 April	Martyrs
	Theodore of Sykeon	613	22 April	Bishop of Anastasiopolis-Peritheorion, Venerable; a.k.a. Theodore the Sykeote
	Theodore of Tabennese	368	16 May	Venerable, the Sanctified, disciple of St. Pachomius
	Theodore of Tarsus	690	19 September	Archbishop of Canterbury, Venerable
	Theodore of Tomsk	1864	20 January / 22 June	Righteous, Wonderworker, starets; who is rumoured to be Tsar Alexander I; native name Fyodor Kuzmich
	Theodore of Vienne	575	29 October	Abbot, Hieromonk, Venerable; a.k.a. Theudurius, Theudar, Cherf and Chef
	Theodore of Vršac	1594	29 May [O.S. 16 May]	Bishop of Vršac, Venerable Hieromartyr, patron saint of Vršac; surnamed Nestorović
	Theodore the Black	1299	19 September	Right-Believing, Prince of Smolensk and Yaroslav, Venerable
	Theodore the Presbyter and Pausilippus	130	15 April	Martyrs
	Theodore the Studite	826	11 November	Church Father, Hegumen, Venerable Confessor
	Theodore the Varangian and his son John	978–988	12 July	Martyrs
	Theodore the Venerable	820	27 December	Venerable, iconodule
	Theodorus the Branded	842	27 December	Venerable Confessor, the Branded, brother of St. Theophanes of Nicaea
	Theodosia of Constantinople	729	29 May	Virgin Martyr, iconodule
	Theodosius of Kiev	1074	3 May / 14 August / 2 September / 28 September	Venerable, father of Russian monasticism
	Theodosius of Manyava	1629	24 June	Hegumen, Venerable of Manyava Skete
	Theodota of Philippi	318	29 September	Martyr
	Theognostus of Kiev	1353	14 March	Metropolitan of Kiev and all Rus', Venerable
	Theophan the Recluse	1894	6 January or 10 January	Church Father, Bishop of Tambov and Shatsk, the Recluse, Venerable; well known for his writings on the spiritual life
	Theophanes of Nicaea	845	11 October	Bishop of Nicaea, Venerable, brother of St. Theodorus the Branded
	Theophanes the Confessor	810–819	12 March	Venerable Confessor, iconodule
	Theophilus of Antioch	c. 183	6 December	Church Father, Patriarch of Antioch, Venerable
	Theophylact of Bulgaria	1126	31 December	Archbishop of Ohrid and Bulgaria, Venerable, Blessed; a.k.a. Theophylact of Ohrid
	Theotimos of Tomi	410	20 April	Bishop of Tomi, Venerable
	Thomas the Apostle	72	6 October / 30 June	Apostle, Martyr
	Thyrsus	251	14 December	Martyr; a.k.a.Thyrse
	Tiburtius	c. 286	11 August	Martyr
	Tikhon of Kaluga	1492	16 June	Venerable; who founded the Monastery of the Dormition of the Theotokos in Kaluga; a.k.a. Tikhon of Medyn
	Tikhon of Moscow	1925	7 April	Patriarch of Moscow, Apostle of America, Venerable Hieroconfessor
	Tikhon of Zadonsk	1783	13 August	Bishop of Voronezh, Wonderworker of Zadonsk, Venerable
	Timon the Deacon	33–100	30 December / 28 July / 4 January	Apostle of the Seventy, one of the seven Deacons, Bishop of Bosra, Hieromartyr
	Timothy I of Alexandria	384	13 February	Patriarch of Alexandria, Venerable
	Timothy of Ephesus	93	22 January / 4 January	Apostle of the Seventy, Bishop of Ephesus, Hieromartyr
	Timothy of Prusa	362	10 June	Bishop of Prusa, Hieromartyr
	Tiridates III of Armenia	c. 330	29 November	King of Armenia; who made the Kingdom of Armenia the first nation in history to make Christianity the official religion
	Titus	96 / 107	25 August / 4 January	Apostle of the Seventy, Archbishop of Crete
	Tobias of Jerusalem	c. 117	17 December	Patriarch of Jerusalem
	Trophimus of Arles	c. 280	29 December	Bishop of Arles
	Trophimus the Ephesian	33–100	15 April / 4 January	Apostle of the Seventy, disciple of St. Paul
	Trophimus, Sabbatius, and Dorymedon	c. 278	19 September	Martyrs
	Tryphon of Campsada	250	1 February	Great Martyr, Unmercenary Healer, Wonderworker
	Tryphon of Pechenga	1583	15 December	Enlightener of the Lapps, Hegumen of Pechenga Monastery, Venerable
	Tsotne the Confessor	1259	30 July	Confessor, Prince of Egrisi; surnamed Dadiani
	Tychicus	33–150	8 December / 4 January	Apostle of the Seventy, Bishop of Caesarea
	Ulrich of Augsburg	973	4 July	Bishop of Augsburg, Venerable
	Urban of Langres	c. 390	2 April	Bishop of Langres, Venerable
	Urban of Macedonia	33–100	31 October / 4 January	Apostle of the Seventy, Apostle of Macedonia, Bishop of Macedonia, Hieromartyr
	Urban I of Rome	230	25 May	Patriarch of Rome, Venerable
	Uriel the Archangel	N/A (Note: According to Christian theology, angels do not die.)	8 November	Archangel; a.k.a. Oriel and Auriel
	Uroš the Great	1277	1 May [O.S. 19 April]	Right-Believing, King of Serbia, Ktetor; regnal name Stefan Uroš I
	Uroš the Weak	1371	15 December [O.S. 2 December]	Right-Believing, King of Serbia, Ktetor; regnal name Stefan Uroš V
	Urošica	1285–1316	24 November [O.S. 11 November]	Venerable, Myroblyte; birth name Stefan Urošic Nemanjić
	Ursula of Cologne	c. 383	21 October	Virgin Martyr
	Valentine of Passau	c. 470	7 January	Abbot, Venerable
	Valentine of Terni	269	14 February / 6 July / 30 July	Bishop of Terni, Venerable Hieromartyr; eponym of St. Valentine's Day
	Venantius Fortunatus	600 / 609	14 December	Church Father, Bishop of Poitiers, Venerable
	Victor I of Rome	198	28 July	Patriarch of Rome, Venerable Hieromartyr
	Victor of Capua	554	17 October	Church Father, Bishop of Capua, Venerable
	Victor of Damascus	c. 170	11 November	Martyr, Military Saint
	Victorinus of Pettau	303 / 304	2 November	Church Father, Bishop of Pettau, Venerable Hieromartyr
	Vigilius of Trent	405	26 June	Bishop of Trent, Venerable
	Vincent, Orontius, and Victor	305	22 January	Martyrs
	Vincent of León	c. 554	11 September	Abbot of Monastery of St. Claudius, Venerable Martyr, martyred by Arian Visigoths
	Vincent of León	c. 950	9 May	Abbot of Monastery of Saint Peter of Montes, Venerable
	Vincent of Lérins	c. 445	24 May	Church Father, Bishop of Lérins, Venerable
	Vincent of Saragossa	304	11 November	Protomartyr of Spain, Hieromartyr, Deacon; a.k.a. Vincent of Spain
	Vitalian of Capua	680–700	16 July	Bishop of Capua, Venerable; a.k.a. Vitalianus
	Vitalian of Osimo	776	16 July	Bishop of Osimo, Venerable
	Vitalian of Rome	672	23 July	Patriarch of Rome, Venerable
	Vitus of Sicily	303	15 June	Martyr; whose companions were Modestus and Crescentia; a.k.a. Guy and Guido
	Vladimir the Great	1015	15 July	Equal-to-the-Apostles, Enlightener of Rus', Grand Prince of Kiev
	Vladimir of Novgorod	1052	4 October	Right-believing, Wonderworker, Prince of Novgorod, native name Vladimir Yaroslavich
	Vladislav	c. 1269	7 October [O.S. 24 September] 12 August [O.S. 30 July]	Right-Believing, King of Serbia, Ktetor, regnal name Stefan Vladislav
	Vukašin of Klepci	1943	29 May [O.S. 16 May] 13 September [O.S. 31 August]	New Martyr; a.k.a. Vukašin of Jasenovac, surnamed Mandrapa
	Wenceslaus I of Bohemia	935	28 September	Duke of Bohemia, Martyr; patron saint of Czechia
	Werburgh	699	3 February	Venerable, Anglo-Saxon princess
	Wiborada of St. Gall	926	2 May	Venerable Martyr, Swabian noblewoman; a.k.a. Guiborat, Weibrath or Viborata
	Wilfrid of Ripon	709	12 October	Bishop of York, Venerable
	Wilfrid the Younger	744	29 April	Venerable, disciple of St. John of Beverley
	Wilfrida of Wilton	c. 988	13 September	Abbess, Venerable, mother of St Edith of Wilton
	William of Dijon	1031	1 January	Venerable, founder of the Abbey of Fruttuaria; a.k.a. William of Volpiano, William of Saint-Benignus and William of Fécamp
	William of Gellone	812	28 May	Venerable; who founded Saint-Guilhem-le-Désert Abbey
	William of Peñacorada	1042	20 March	Venerable; who founded the Priory of Saint William of Peñacorada
	Willibrord	739	7 November	Apostle to the Frisians, first Bishop of Utrecht, Venerable
	Winibald	761	18 December	Bishop of Eichstätt, Abbot of Heidenheim, Venerable
	Winifred	601–700	3 November	Virgin Martyr; a.k.a. Winefride
	Wolfeius	1001–1100	9 December	Hermit
	Wolfgang of Regensburg	994	31 October	Bishop of Regensburg, Venerable, the Almoner
	Xenia of Saint Petersburg	1803	24 January	Blessed, Fool for Christ; who wandered the streets of Saint Petersburg wearing her dead husband's military uniform for 45 years
	Xenia of Rome	401–500	24 January	Venerable, Righteous, Deaconess
	Xenophon of Robika	1262	26 January	Venerable
	Yaropolk Izyaslavich	1087	22 November	King of Rus, Blessed, great-grandson of St. Vladimir
	Yaroslav the Wise	1054	20 February	Equal-to-the-Apostles, Grand Prince of Kiev
	Ymar	830	12 November	Venerable Martyr
	Yrchard	401–500	24 August	Bishop, Venerable; name also spelled Irchard, Yarchard, Merchard, Erchard and Erthad
	Ysarn	1048	24 September	Abbot of the Monastery of St. Victor, Venerable, name also spelled Isarn
	Ywi	690	8 October	Venerable, Deacon
	Zachariah the Recluse	301–400	24 March	Desert Father, Venerable, the Recluse
	Zachary of Rome	752	15 March	Patriarch of Rome, Venerable
	Zachary of Vienne	c. 106	26 May	Bishop of Vienne, Venerable Hieromartyr
	Zama of Bologna	c. 268	24 January	Bishop of Bologna, Venerable
	Zebennus	201–300	13 November	Bishop of Eleutheropolis, Venerable Hieromartyr
	Zechariah the Sickle-Seer	c. 600 BC – c. 501 BC	8 February	Prophet, the Sickle-Seer; who wrote the Book of Zechariah; a.k.a. Zacharias
	Zechariah, father of John the Baptist	c. 10 – c. 50	5 September	Prophet, High Priest of Israel, Hieromartyr
	Zechariah of Lyon	202	28 June	Bishop of Lyon, Venerable
	Zenaida and Philonella	c. 100	11 October	Holy Unmercenaries, cousins of St. Paul
	Zenas the Lawyer	33–100	27 September / 4 January	Apostle of the Seventy, Bishop of Lydda
	Zeno of Gaza	c. 362	21 September	Desert Father, Venerable Martyr, brother of Saints Eusebius and Nestabus
	Zeno the Hermit	c. 416	30 January	Venerable, Hermit, disciple of St. Basil the Great; a.k.a. Zeno of Antioch
	Zeno the Prophet	c. 451	19 June	Desert Father, Venerable Wonderworker
	Zeno of Verona	371	12 April	Church Father, Bishop of Verona, Venerable Hieromartyr; who opposed Arianism
	Zenobius of Florence	417	25 May	Bishop of Florence, Venerable
	Zephaniah	c. 641 BC – c. 520 BC	2 December	Prophet; who wrote the Book of Zephaniah; a.k.a. Sophanias
	Zephyrinus of Rome	217	26 August	Church Father, Patriarch of Rome, Venerable Hieromartyr
	Zoe of Rome	286	18 December	Martyr
	Zoilus of Córdoba	c. 301	27 June	Martyr
	Zosimas of Palestine	c. 560	4 April	Venerable
	Zosimas of Solovki	1478	17 April / 8 August	Hegumen, Venerable; who founded the Solovki Monastery with St. Sabbatius
	Zosimus of Cilicia	c. 284 – c. 350	4 January	Venerable Confessor; a.k.a. Zosimus the Hermit
	Zosimus of Spoleto	110	19 June	Martyr
	Zosimus of Syracuse	662	21 January / 30 March	Bishop of Syracuse, Abbot, Venerable
	Zosimus of Rome	418	26 December	Patriarch of Rome, Venerable
	Zoticus of Comana	204	21 July	Bishop of Comana Pontica, Venerable Hieromartyr, who opposed Montanism
	Zoticus of Constantinople	c. 340	30 December	Hieromartyr, Guardian of Orphans; a.k.a. Zoticus the Priest

== See also ==
- List of Eastern Orthodox saint titles
- List of saints in the Russian Orthodox Church
- List of saints of the Serbian Orthodox Church
- List of American Orthodox saints
