= Abrahamites =

18th-century sect of deists in Bohemia

The Abrahamites were an 18th-century religious sect in Bohemia, described both as deists and as a Christian Judaizing movement, which flourished principally between 1747 and 1781 and professed to follow the patriarch Abraham before his circumcision. They are not to be confused with the descendants of Abraham, namely the Northern Arabs and Jews, nor with the 9th-century Syrian group known as the Abrahamite monks, who were exterminated under the iconoclastic emperor Theophilus.

The Abrahamites believed in one God but rejected the Trinity, original sin, and the perpetuity of punishment for sin. They confined their religious obligations principally to the Ten Commandments and the Lord's Prayer, observed Saturday as the Sabbath, abstained from pork, and occasionally practised circumcision. Their leader, Jan Pita, was executed in 1748. Because the sect maintained contact with the local Jewish community, several Jewish leaders were also put on trial.

When Emperor Joseph II promulgated his edict of toleration in 1781, extending toleration to non-Roman Catholics, the Abrahamites nevertheless refused to identify themselves as either Christians or Jews. They were consequently excluded from the edict's protection and deported to various parts of the country, with the men drafted into frontier regiments. The sect thereby collapsed. Some adherents subsequently became Roman Catholics, while those who retained Abrahamite beliefs were unable to transmit them to the next generation.

== See also ==
- Hanifs
