= Lists of Eastern Orthodox saints =

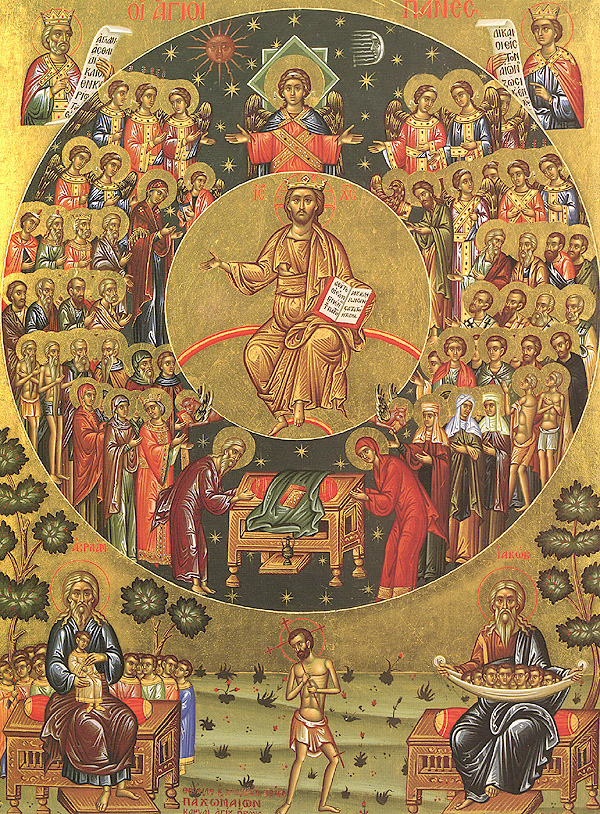
Icon depicting the Synaxis of All Saints; various saints can be identified by their saint attributes, such as Patriarch Abraham (bottom left, silver hair) or Patriarch Jacob (bottom right, seated).

This is an incomplete list of canonised saints in the Eastern Orthodox Church.

In Eastern Orthodoxy, a saint is defined as anyone, other than God, who is in heaven, whether recognised here on earth, or not. By this definition, Adam and Eve, Moses, the various prophets, and archangels are all given the title of Saint. Sainthood in the Orthodox Church does not necessarily reflect a moral model, but communion with God; there are many examples of people who lived in great sin and became saints by humility and repentance: Saints Mary of Egypt, Moses the Ethiopian, and Dismas, the repentant thief who was crucified with Jesus Christ. Therefore, a more complete Orthodox definition of what a saint is, has to do with the way that saints, through their humility and their love of humankind, saved inside them the entire Church, and loved all people.

Orthodox belief states that God reveals saints through answered prayers and other miracles. Saints are usually recognised by their local community, often by people who directly knew them. As their popularity grows they are often then recognised by the entire Church through the Holy Spirit. The word canonisation means that a Christian has been found worthy to have his name placed in the canon (official list) of saints of the Church. The formal process of recognition involves deliberation by a synod of bishops. Evidence of a virtuous life and prior local veneration of the saint are required for canonization.

Because the Church shows no true distinction between the living and the dead, as the saints are considered to be alive in heaven, saints are referred to as if they are still alive, and are venerated, not worshipped. They are believed to be able to intercede for the living for salvation or other requests and help humankind either through direct communion with God or by personal intervention.

== Lists ==
- List of Eastern Orthodox saints (A–G)
- List of Eastern Orthodox saints (H–M)
- List of Eastern Orthodox saints (N–S)
- List of Eastern Orthodox saints (T–Z)

== See also ==
- List of Eastern Orthodox saint titles
- List of Russian Eastern Orthodox saints
- List of Serbian Eastern Orthodox saints
- List of American Eastern Orthodox saints
