= Yegor Chekryakovsky =

Saint Georgy Kossov
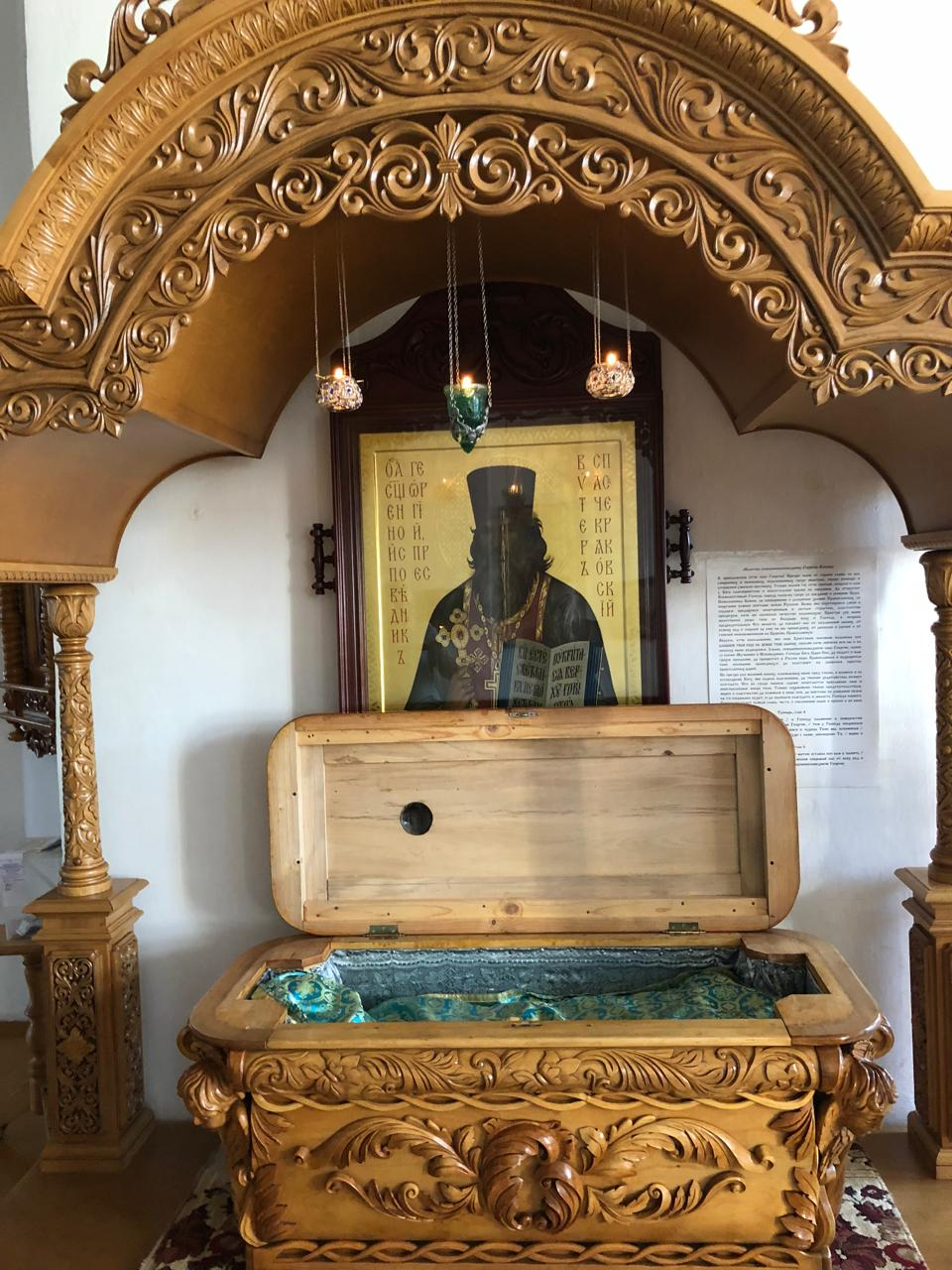
- The reliquary of Georgy Kossov in 2018

Hieroconfessor
- Born: 4 April 1855; Androsovo, Oryol Governorate, Russian Empire
- Died: 19 April 1928
- Honored in: Eastern Orthodox Church
- Canonized: 9 October 2000
- Feast: 8 September; 9 December (finding of relics)

Georgy Kossov (Russian: Георгий Коссов) also known as Yegor Chekryakovsky (Егор Чекряковский, literally Yegor of Chekryak, Yegor being a simplified form of Georgy; 4 April 1855 – 19 April 1928) was a Russian Orthodox priest, confessor and starets. He was glorified as a saint on 9 October 2000.

== Biography ==
Kossov's biography was written in Sergei Nilus's book Father Yegor Checkryakovsky. He is often referred as the soul heir of Amvrosy of Optino.

Kossov was born to the family of a village priest in the village of Androsovo, Oryol Governorate, Russia. He graduated from Oryol seminary and taught in the village school of Oryol Governorate. In 1884, he became a priest of the village of Spas-Chekryak near the town Bolkhov of Oryol Governorate. He worked there until his death in 1928.

Kossov was famous for his prophecies including the prophecy of the October Revolution. He rebuilt the church of Spas-Chekryak, organised a boys' school and a girls' orphanage.

== Veneration ==
In 2000, he was formally glorified and his relics were transferred to the Cathedral of Bolkhov. He is commemorated on 8 September. The finding of his relics is also commemorated on 9 December.
