= Right-Believing =

Right-Believing (Russian: благоверный, Greek: εὐσεβής, Latin: pius), also called under the prefix The most Orthodox, is an Orthodox saint title for monarchs who were canonized for having lived a righteous life. They do not belong to martyrs or passion bearers. The saint title was initially given to Byzantine Emperors and their wives by the Patriarchate of Constantinople in the period of Ecumenical Councils, but other local Orthodox churches later took that tradition, including the Russian Orthodox Church. Russian Right-Believing princes include Andrey Bogolyubsky, Davyd Yuryevich, Alexander Nevsky, and Dmitry Donskoy.

== See also ==
- List of Eastern Orthodox saint titles

== Literature ==
- "Благоверный". Brockhaus and Efron Encyclopedic Dictionary: In 86 Volumes (82 Volumes and 4 Additional Volumes) (in Russian). Vol. IV. St. Petersburg: F. A. Brockhaus. 1890–1907. p. 42.
- Андроник (Трубачёв) (2002). "Благоверный". Православная энциклопедия. Vol. 5. pp. 251–252.
