= List of Eastern Orthodox saint titles =

The saints of the Eastern Orthodox Church (and of the Eastern Catholic Churches of the Byzantine Rite) have various customary saint titles with which they are commemorated on the liturgical calendar and in Divine Services.

Many of the titles can overlap with each other (e.g. apostle and disciple) or are at least not mutually exclusive. Some of them are, however, mutually exclusive (e.g. prophet and righteous). Some titles are only given to one saint, very often the Virgin Mary, and some titles are also no longer given to saints (e.g. apostle).

It is not rare that certain titles, such as Venerable, Prophet or Hieromartyr, are placed in front of a saint's name instead of the standard Saint (e.g. Venerable Bede, Prophet Jonah or Hieromartyr Maximus Sandovic).

== List ==
The following list explains the titles and gives an exemplary saint for each title:

- Archangel: an angel of the second lowest rank, whose purpose is to act as a messenger of God to humans; this rank of angel is the only one to have known names (e.g. Michael the Archangel)
- Apostle: one of the twelve men who followed Jesus and who were sent out on the Great Commission in Matthew 28:16–20 to spread the Gospel to all nations; they may also be simultaneously be called Disciples (although Judas Iscariot was one of the original twelve Apostles, he is never called as such in the Orthodox Church, since his position was filled in by St. Matthias after his suicide)
- Blessed: a title very often given to Fools for Christ (see below) as well as rulers and monastics known for their great piety and asceticism. It is also rarely used in its literal sense for certain early saints (e.g. Basil the Blessed, Peter I of Bulgaria and Blessed Augustine respectively)
- Child Martyr: a martyr who was martyred at a young age, typically below the age of 20 (e.g. Gabriel of Białystok)
- Confessor of the Faith or Confessor: one who suffered for the faith but was not martyred outright (e.g. Maximus the Confessor)
- Coryphaeus or Coryphe: a Latin term borrowed from Ancient Greek, originally referring to a leader of a Greek chorus, this title is exclusively used for Saints Peter and Paul, in reference to their leadership of the other Apostles
- Disciple: one of the seventy or seventy-two men who were sent by Jesus in pairs to spread the Gospel in Luke 10:1–21; they may also simultaneously be called Apostles (e.g. Timothy of Ephesus)
- Enlightener or Illuminator: a saint who first brought the faith to a people or region, or who did major work of evangelisation there (e.g. Sava I of Serbia)
- Ethnomartyr: a martyr who was martyred due to their ethnicity (e.g. Gregory V of Constantinople)
- Equal-to-the-Apostles: one whose work greatly built up the Church, whether through direct missionary work or through assisting the Church's place in society, but was not one of the twelve Apostles (e.g. Constantine the Great)
- Evangelist: one of the four men who wrote the four Gospels, as well as any saint who preached the Gospel (e.g. Luke the Evangelist)
- Fool for Christ: one known for his apparent yet holy foolishness or insanity (e.g. Gabriel of Georgia)
- Great Hierarch: one of the Three Holy Hierarchs, which includes Basil the Great, Gregory the Theologian, and John Chrysostom
- God-bearing or Theophoros: title given to Ignatius of Antioch, who according to holy tradition, was one of the children who went to Jesus in Matthew 19:13–14
- Healer: a saint who used the power of God to heal maladies and injuries (e.g. Tryphon of Campsada)
- Hesychast: a monastic saint who prayed using hesychasm (e.g. Joseph the Hesychast)
- Hieroconfessor: a confessor who is also a clergyman (e.g. Martin the Confessor)
- Hieromartyr or priestmartyr: a martyr who is also a clergyman (e.g. Charalambos)
- Iconographer: a saint who creates, or writes, icons (e.g. Andrew the Iconographer)
- Intercessor: a saint who prays, or intercedes, on behalf of the living and the dead. All saints bear this title, although they are rarely ever formally titled as such (e.g. Seraphim of Sarov)
- Martyr: ultimately from Ancient Greek: μάρτυς, lit. 'witness'; one who has died for the faith (e.g. Sebastian of Rome)
- Merciful: one known for almsgiving, especially towards the poor (e.g. John the Merciful)
- Myrrhbearer: the first witnesses of the Resurrection of Jesus (e.g. Mary Magdalene)
- Myroblyte, Myrrh-gusher or Myrrh-streaming: the relics of the saint exude holy and sweet-smelling —and often miraculous—oil (e.g. Simeon the Myrrh-streaming)
- New or Younger: title of a saint who shares a name with an earlier saint (e.g. Stephen the Younger)
- New Confessor: a confessor, often but not always sharing a name with an earlier one, who suffered for the faith during or after the Ottoman persecutions or onwards (e.g. Barnabas the New Confessor)
- New Martyr or Neomartyr: a martyr, often but not always sharing a name with an earlier one, who was martyred during the Ottoman persecutions or onwards (e.g. Maria of Paris)
- Newly-Revealed: a saint whose veneration was either forgotten within the Church or previously unknown, but was later revived through miraculous means (e.g. Phanourios the Newly-Revealed)
- Panagia: from Greek: Παναγία, romanized: Panagia, lit. 'All-holy'; the title is only given to the Virgin Mary, referring to her position as the holiest of all saints
- Passion Bearer: one who was killed not for the faith but faced death in a Christ-like manner (e.g. Nicholas II of Russia)
- Pillar of Orthodoxy: Photius the Great, Gregory Palamas, and Mark of Ephesus are each known by this title, for their defenses of Orthodox doctrine
- Prophet: a saint under the Old Covenant who anticipated and prophesied Christ and who spoke the word of God (e.g. Elijah)
- Protomartyr: the first martyr in a given region or time period (in the case of Stephen the Protomartyr, the first martyr of the whole Church)
- Right-Believing: a monarch or ruler who treated the Church and the people well (e.g. Vladimir of Novgorod)
- Righteous: a saint under the Old Covenant who is not a prophet but also a married saint of the New Covenant (e.g. Job and Fevronia of Murom respectively)
- Saint: ultimately from Latin: sanctus, lit. 'holy one'; a human or angel who is in heaven; one who has been saved, whom the Church on earth has recognised and glorified. All saints bear this title (e.g. Publius of Malta)
- Stylite: a monastic saint who lived an ascetic life on top of a pillar, often not coming down for long periods of time (e.g. Daniel the Stylite)
- Taxiarch: an archangel who leads the Heavenly Host; only Archangels Michael and Gabriel are given this title.
- Theologian: a saint whose writings have introduced new theological doctrines; only three saints are given the title Theologian: John the Theologian, Gregory the Theologian, and Symeon the New Theologian.
- Theotokos, Bogorodica or Mother of God: ultimately from Greek: Θεοτόκος, romanized: Theotókos, lit. 'She who gave birth to God', the title given only to the Virgin Mary, since she gave birth to Jesus, who Orthodox Christians believe is the Second Person of the Holy Trinity, and thus God
- Unmercenary Healer: a saint who used the power of God to heal maladies and injuries without payment (e.g. Pantaleon of Nicomedia)
- Venerable: a monastic saint; a saint who is a monk or nun (e.g. Paisios of Mount Athos)
- Hieromartyr, venerable martyr, hosiomartyr, monk-martyr or nun-martyr: a martyred monastic (e.g. Zeno of Gaza)
- Virgin: a female saint who consecrated her life to Christ and made a vow of chastity (e.g. Agatha of Palermo)
- Virgin Martyr: a celibate female martyr (e.g. Lucy of Syracuse)
- Wonderworker or thaumaturge: a saint known for performing miracles during his/her lifetime (e.g. Nicholas of Myra)

== See also ==
- Honorifics
- Ktetor
- Local saint
- List of Eastern Orthodox saints

== Sources ==
- Derived with permission from Saint titles at OrthodoxWiki.
