= Alexei Shepelev =

Orthodox saint and monk of the Kyiv Pechersk Lavra

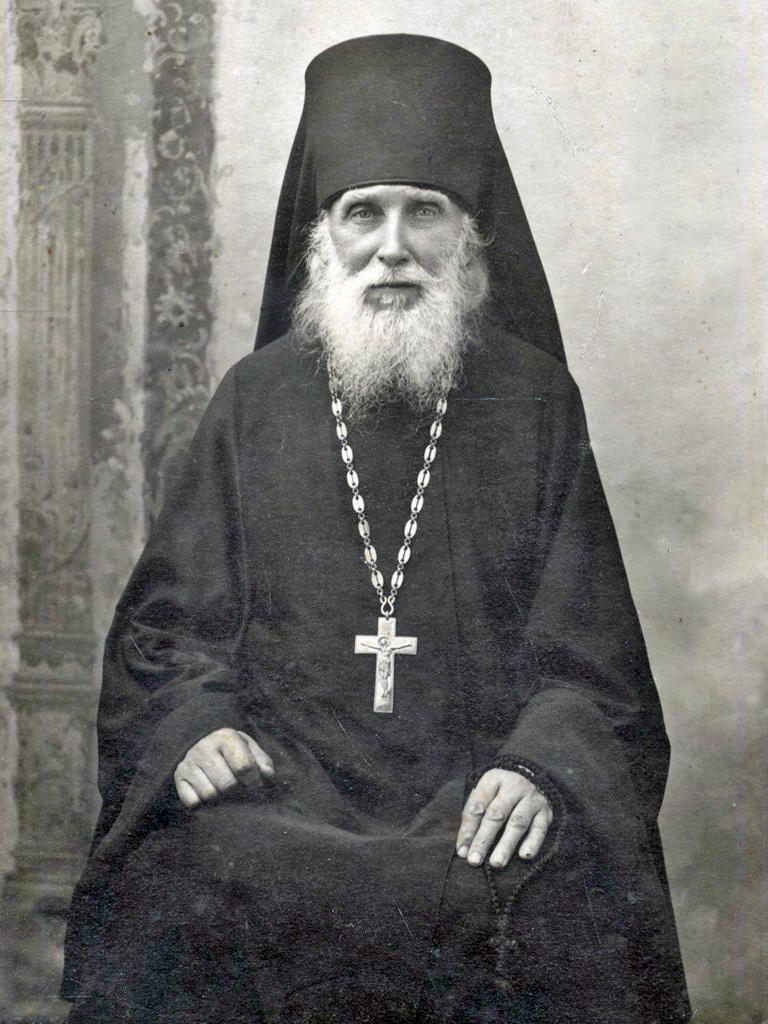
- Born: April 14, 1840; Kyiv
- Died: March 11, 1917 (aged 76); Kyiv
- Honored in: Ukrainian Orthodox Church (Moscow Patriarchate)
- Canonized: July 15, 1993, Kyiv by Synod of the Ukrainian Orthodox Church of the Moscow Patriarchate
- Feast: March 11, September 21

Alexei Goloseyevskiy (Russian: Алексий Голосеевский, secular name Vladimir Ivanovich Shepelev, Russian: Владимир Иванович Шепелев; born 14 April 1840 in Kyiv, died 11 March 1917 in Kyiv) was an Orthodox saint and monk, venerated by the Ukrainian Orthodox Church of the Moscow Patriarchate. As a child, he was entrusted to the Kyiv Pechersk Lavra, where he became a cleric. For the last 20 years of his life, he resided at the Goloseevsky Hermitage in Kyiv, serving as a confessor and spiritual guide. The Orthodox Church attributes to Alexei the gifts of prophecy, prayer, and confession.

== Childhood ==
Saint Alexei Shepelev was born on 14 April 1840 in Kyiv to a noble family. His father, Joann Shepelev, served as a captain in the Kyiv arsenal. His mother, Maria Shepeleva, attended the unveiling of the relics of Saint Mitrophan of Voronezh on 7 August 1832, where she met Bishop Antony, who reportedly told her:

You will give birth to a crippled son, but do not despair: he will become a servant of God.

Seven years later, Maria gave birth to a boy named Vladimir, who was mute. Joann died when Vladimir was three, leaving Maria to raise him, instilling Christian values and teaching him love for others. She took him to prisons to distribute alms and visited the Kitayevska Hermitage of the Kyiv Pechersk Lavra, home to the fool for Christ hieromonk Theophil. Theophil's words suggested Vladimir would become a monk. Despite the Russian custom of military families sending children to military schools, Maria received a letter from Saint Petersburg in spring 1852, ordering her to bring Vladimir to the capital for cadet training. Advised by Metropolitan Filaret Amfiteatrov of Kyiv, she responded that her son's muteness prevented military service.

In 1853, Maria and Vladimir were invited to a Vespers service for Pascha at Metropolitan Filaret's domestic church. After the Liturgy, during the kissing of the cross on Filaret's crozier, Filaret addressed Vladimir three times with "Christ is Risen!", to which the boy miraculously responded, "Truly He is Risen!" – his first words. Following this healing, Filaret offered to take Vladimir to the Kyiv Pechersk Lavra to serve him. On 2 July 1853, the 13-year-old arrived at the lavra. Four days later, Maria died. Filaret took responsibility for Vladimir's education, arranging lessons with professors from the Kyiv Theological Academy and Kyiv University, covering Russian literature, church and Russian history, Scripture, medicine, and likely Latin. Filaret personally guided his moral and ethical upbringing, instructing him to distribute alms to Kyiv's poor during major Orthodox feasts. Vladimir learned prayer from Elder Parthenius.

Vladimir spent winters in the lavra and summers at the Goloseevsky Hermitage with Filaret and Parthenius. In 1855, Parthenius died, and the ailing Filaret suggested Vladimir petition the Lavra's Spiritual Council to become a novice. On 25 February 1856, the council accepted him, assigning him to the typography workshop. Filaret, who died the following year, gave Vladimir a cassock and his blessing. After joining the monastery, Vladimir left Filaret's residence and moved to a cell in the lavra.

== Life in the Kyiv Pechersk Lavra ==
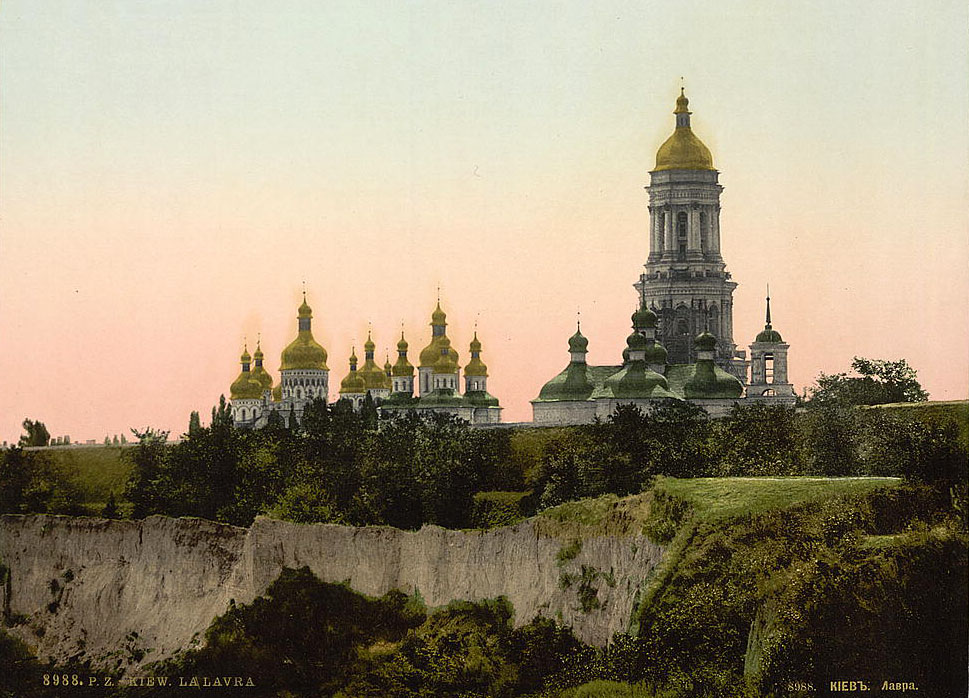
Kyiv Pechersk Lavra

On 15 April 1857, the Spiritual Council admitted Shepelev as a permanent novice, retaining his typography duties. During his novitiate, relatives urged him to abandon monastic life and marry, but Archimandrite Varlaam's intervention dissuaded them. Before taking perpetual vows, Shepelev pilgrimaged to the tomb of Saint Mitrophan of Voronezh in Voronezh and performed a memorial service at Bishop Antony's grave. In 1872, he was to become a monk. Archimandrite Varlaam, the Lavra's superior, chose the name Filaret (after Shepelev's mentor), but on 13 April 1872 (Maundy Thursday), during the tonsure, he changed it to Alexei. On 12 September 1872, Father Alexei was transferred to the First Nikolaevsky Hospital Monastery.

The hospital monastery, under the Lavra's Spiritual Council, assigned Alexei as a scribe. On 23 November 1873, he was ordained a hierodeacon. On 23 December 1874, he became the sacristan. A silver chalice inscribed "In memory of Hierodeacon Alexei (Shepelev)" was donated by him to the monastery's church. On 6 December 1875, Metropolitan Arsenius ordained him a hieromonk. On 20 August 1879, Alexei was reassigned to the Near Caves of the Lavra, maintaining order at the reliquaries of saints and assisting pilgrims, serving over six years and earning a cross from the Holy Synod. On 7 October 1885, he became sacristan of the Great Church (Cathedral of the Dormition) of the Kyiv Lavra. An incident led to his dismissal: the Stepanova sisters accused him of misappropriating 5,000 rubles entrusted to him. They complained to Archimandrite Juvenaly Polovtsev, the Lavra's superior, and Metropolitan Platon Gorodetsky. Receiving no response, they wrote to the Lavra's ecclesiarch, Archimandrite Valentin, who was hostile to Alexei. On 21 September 1887, the Spiritual Council removed Alexei as sacristan. Persistent accusations prompted his transfer to the Spaso-Preobrazhenska Hermitage south of Kyiv on 30 April 1891, where he often reflected on mortality.

== Goloseevsky Hermitage ==
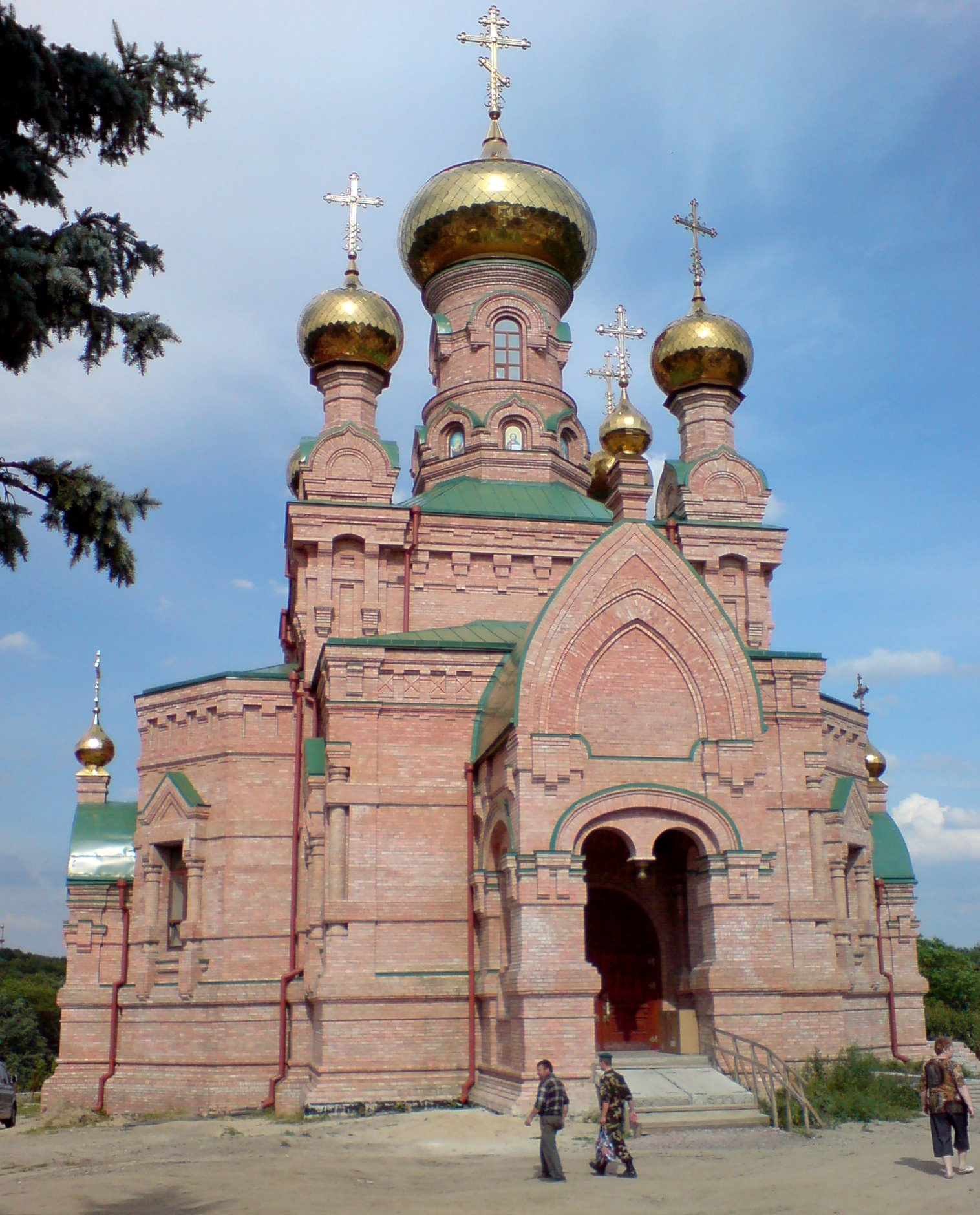
Goloseevsky Hermitage, rebuilt in the 1990s

Alexei was confessor to two metropolitans, Joannicius and Flavian Gorodetsky. In April 1911, he was summoned to Chernihiv to perform last rites for the dying Archbishop Antony. He also administered last rites to Bishop Flavian two days before his death in 1915.

In 1905, Alexei received the Order of Saint Anna III degree. In 1913, Metropolitan Flavian awarded him a pastoral staff, typically reserved for an hegumen or higher, despite Alexei being a hieromonk.

Alexei frequently pilgrimaged to the Nikolaevskaya Hermitage in Chernigov Governorate, visited the Kyiv Pechersk Lavra several times yearly, and revered the icon of Saint Nicholas at Bessarabka (Kyiv's covered market). Late in life, he declined an offer to return to the Lavra as caretaker of the Far Caves.

== Canonization ==
Veneration of Alexei began immediately after his death. Though the Goloseevsky Hermitage was destroyed under Soviet rule, his grave remained intact. After the fall of communism, Orthodoxy revived in Ukraine. In 1993, the hermitage was rebuilt, and Alexei's remains were moved to its church. On 15 July 1993, during an all-night vigil for Saint Vladimir the Great at the Lavra's Holy Trinity Church, Alexei was canonized. His feast days are 11 March and 21 September.

A portion of Alexei's relics is housed in the Church of the Protection of the Most Holy Theotokos in Sloboda Oziericka, Smalyavichy district.

== Prophecies of Alexei ==
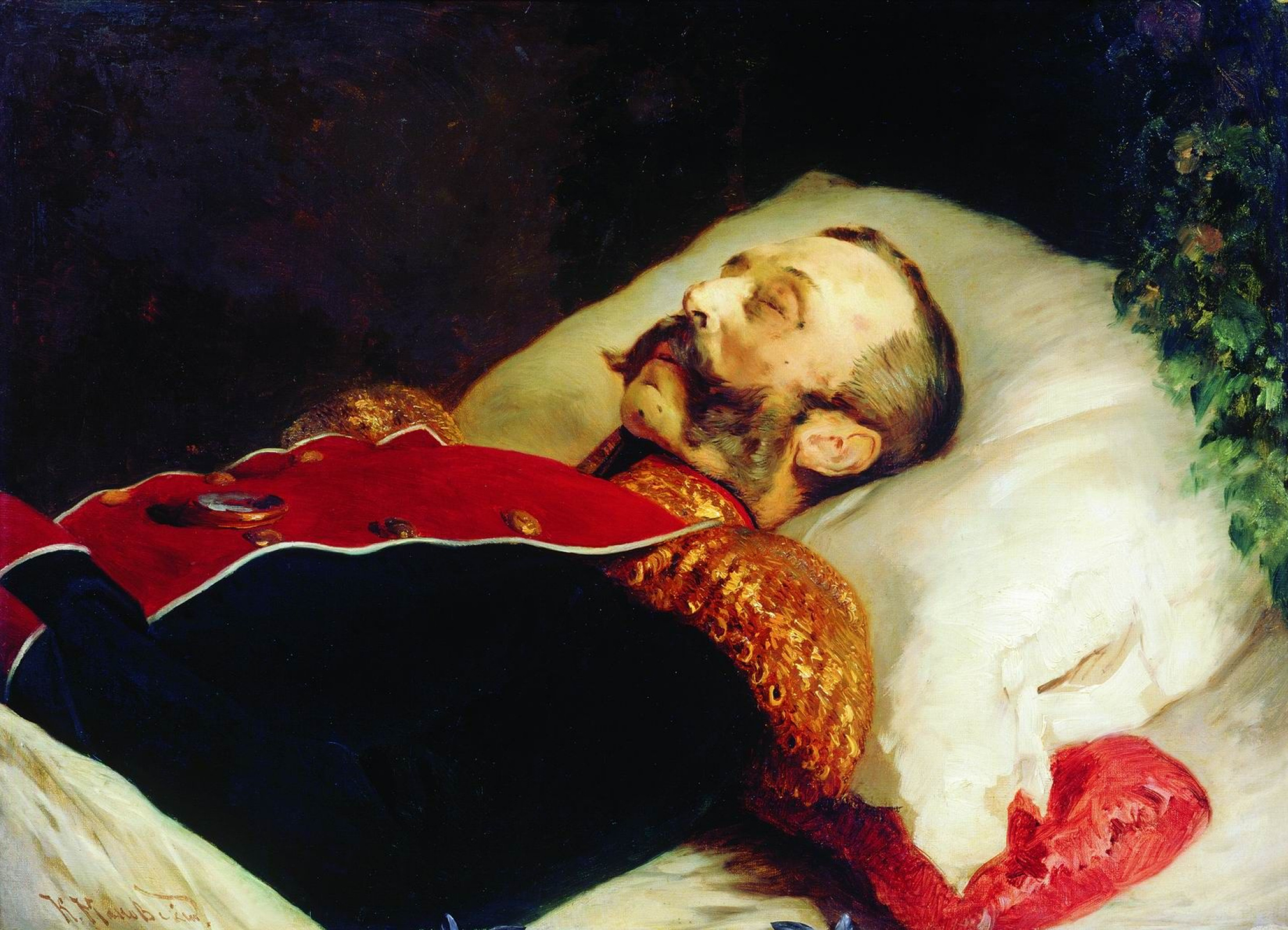
Konstantin Makovsky, Portrait of Alexander II on His Deathbed (1881), Tretyakov Gallery

The Orthodox Church attributes prophetic gifts to Alexei, citing events from pilgrims' lives and his pastoral work. On 1 March 1881, during elevation, Alexei noticed that the particle for Tsar Alexander II was light brown, unlike the white particles, suggesting it was stained with wine. He interpreted this as a divine warning of danger to the tsar, who was assassinated that day. In 1888, Alexei predicted to parents visiting the hermitage that their two-year-old daughter, Wassa Kowalewa, would become a holy nun persecuted for her faith. She later joined a monastery as Faina.

In 1896, during the unveiling of Saint Theodosius of Chernigov's reliquary, Alexei, tasked with changing the saint's vestments, dreamt of Theodosius requesting liturgical prayers for his parents. When Alexei asked why Theodosius, being saved, did not pray himself, the saint emphasized the power of liturgical prayer. The church cites this to highlight prayers for the dead. Theodosius revealed his parents' names (Nikita and Maria), unknown to the church or folk tradition. Alexei shared this with Metropolitan Joannicius Rudnev, who forbade disclosure. Years later, the Vydubychi Monastery's Synodik of the Uglich family recorded Theodosius, then hegumen, listing his parents' names.

In 1907, Alexei called Nun Eufalia an abbess. Five years later, as a treasurer, she visited again, and he reiterated the title, predicting her aunt's imminent death (she died that year). In 1914, Eufalia became an abbess. In 1911, Novice Nikolai, seeking a blessing before visiting a Balkan monastery, was told by Alexei that monks would soon flee to the hermitage due to unrest. In 1912, dogmatic disputes over the Name of God at the monastery, exploited by secular authorities to curb Russian Church influence in Greece, led to Greek troops occupying it, forcing Russian monks to return.

The church lists other undated prophecies, often without personal details. The superior of the Nikolskaya Hermitage in Chernigov Governorate lost a cross over the Dnieper, essential for liturgies. Alexei, visiting annually, brought the lost cross. Akilina Stepanova from Tambov Governorate asked whether to send her sick daughter Varvara to a monastery. Learning of a younger daughter, Paraskeva, planning marriage, Alexei advised preparing a coffin for Paraskeva and assured Varvara's recovery and marriage. Paraskeva died two weeks later, and Varvara married. Alexei told a Kharkov woman's son he would become a bishop like Joasaph of Belgorod, returning her 10-ruble offering with 5 rubles, foreseeing her need for rent. Women from Rzhyshchiv tested Alexei by planning to ask for return fare; he offered it unprompted. A Yeniseysk woman sent 300 rubles for prayers, criticized by a neighbor for funding monks' luxury. Alexei returned the money, quoting the neighbor. He invited the K. family for tea, giving the mother jam to eat alone, later explained by her abusive husband's changed behavior. A novice from Kyiv's Ascension Convent was comforted by Alexei, who predicted her troubles would end with a cell assignment.

== Teachings of Alexei ==
Alexei advised monks to prepare for death, avoid vanity, obey superiors, cherish cell life, maintain spiritual purity, pray constantly, and read saints' lives. To laypeople, he recommended thinking of Christ, restraining self and anger, being strict with oneself but lenient with others, giving alms, doing good, cultivating humility, and embracing suffering for joy. His sayings include:

What am I? – a poor monk.

If I lived in luxury, I would not see so many of God's graces.

Man's approach to God is his approach to happiness; his distance from God is his distance from happiness.

God's mercy compared to human mercy is like the sea to a drop of water. He who does not seek power does not fear its loss.

Money is worms.

== Followers of Alexei ==
Influenced by Alexei, Alexander Gotovtsev joined a monastery as Alexei, became a bishop, and was martyred in the 1930s during Soviet persecution. Hermogenes Golubyev led the Lavra in the 1920s amid closure threats and became a metropolitan. Bishop Vladimir Bogoyavlensky, martyred in January 1918, sought Alexei's prayers; his body was found by Alexei's spiritual son, Archimandrite Antym (Yelenetsky), later imprisoned. Bishops Anthony Abashidze and Pimen Belolikov visited Alexei for spiritual counsel. Bishop Vyacheslav (Shkurko), martyred in 1937, likely compiled Alexei's first biography as a hieromonk.
