= Eusebius, Nestablus, Zeno, and Nestor =

Early Christian martyrs

Saints Eusebius, Nestablus, Zeno, and Nestor
- Died: c. 362; Gaza
- Feast: 8 September

Saints Eusebius, Nestablus, Zeno, and Nestor (died c. 362 AD) were early Christian martyrs in Gaza.

== Life ==
Saints Eusebius, Nestablus and Zeno were three Christian brothers in Gaza during the reign of Julian (r. 361–363). They were imprisoned and tortured, then dragged out by a mob, beaten and killed. Their bodies were burned and their bones were mixed with those of camels and asses. A young man named Nestor was seized with them, tortured and beaten, but then released. He died three days later. According to Sozomen (lib. 5, c.8) the bones of Nestablus and Eusebius were revealed by a miracle to a holy woman who collected and preserved them. The Roman Martyrology gives their feast day as 8 September.

== Butler's account ==
The hagiographer Alban Butler (1710–1773) wrote in his Lives of the Primitive Fathers, Martyrs, and Other Principal Saints, under September 8,

SS. Eusebius, Nestablus, Zeno, and Nestor, Martyrs

In the reign of Julian the Apostate, Eusebius, Nestablus, and Zeno, three zealous Christian brothers at Gaza, were seized by the pagans in their houses, where they had concealed themselves: they were carried to prison, and inhumanly scourged. Afterwards the idolaters, who were assembled in the amphitheatre at the public shows, began loudly to demand the punishment of the sacrilegious criminals, as they called the confessors. By these cries the assembly soon became a tumult; and the people worked themselves into such a ferment that they ran in a fury to the prison, which they forced, and hauling out the three brothers, began to drag them, sometimes on their bellies, sometimes on their backs, bruising them against the pavement, and striking them with clubs, stones, or any thing that came in their way. The very women, quitting their work, ran the points of their spindles into them, and the cooks took the kettles from off the fire, poured the scalding water upon them, and pierced them with their spits. After the martyrs were thus mangled, and their skulls so broken that the ground was smeared with their brains, they were dragged out of the city to the place where the beasts were thrown that died of themselves. Here the people lighted a fire, burned the bodies, and mingled the bones that remained with those of camels and asses, that it might not be easy for the Christians to distinguish them. This cruelty only enhanced the triumph of the martyrs before God, who watches over the precious remains of his elect, to raise them again to glory. With these three brothers there was taken a young man, named Nestor, who suffered imprisonment and scourging as they had done; but as the furious rioters were dragging him through the street, some persons took compassion on him on account of his great beauty and comeliness, and drew him out of the gate. He died of his wounds, within three days, in the house of Zeno, a cousin of the three martyrs, who himself was obliged to fly, and, being taken, was publicly whipped. See Theodoret, Hist. l. 3, c. 7, and Sozomen, l. 5, c. 9.

== Sources ==
- Butler, Alban, 1711-1773 (1812), The lives of the fathers, martyrs, and other principal saints; compiled from original monuments and other authentic records, illustrated with the remarks of judicious modern critics and historians., London: J. Murphy – via archive.org This article incorporates text from this source, which is in the public domain.
- Harington, E.C. (1848), "Papal Exactions in Britain - No. XX", The British Magazine and Monthly Register of Religious and Ecclesiastical Information, Parochial History, and Documents Respecting the State of the Poor, Progress of Education, &c, J. Turrill
- "Sexto Idus Septémbris", Roman Martyrology, Archbishop of Selsey, 8 September 2015
