= Theodota of Philippi =

Saint Theodota
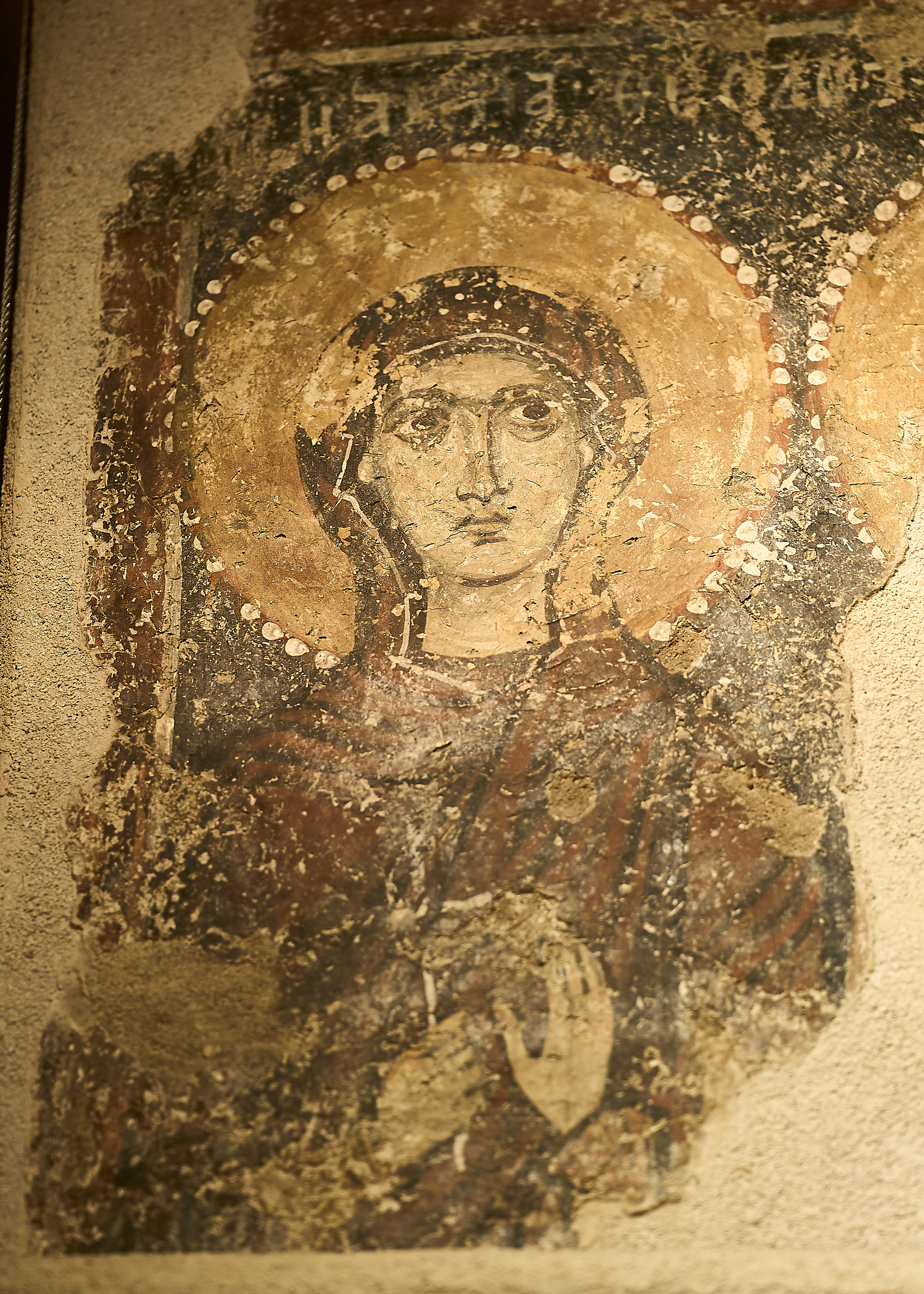
- Born: 3rd century
- Died: 318; Philippopolis (Thrace)
- Feast: 29 September

Theodota of Philippopolis (Greek: Θεοδότη; died 318) was a Greek harlot and martyr. Her feast day is 29 September.

== Smith Lewis's translation ==
Agnes Smith Lewis (1843–1926) in her Select Narratives of Holy Women: Translation: From the Syro-Antiochene Or Sinai Palimpsest wrote,

THEODOTA.

The Syriac text of this legend has been edited by Assemani in his Acta Martyrum Occidentalium, vol. II., p. 221.

In A.D. 318, in the month of September, under the Emperor Licinius, there was a furious persecution of the Christians in the city of Philippi. Agrippa the Prefect had decreed a solemn feast to Apollo, at which all were commanded to sacrifice. A harlot named Theodota refused to do so, and was therefore thrown into prison. Seven hundred and fifty men, admiring her constancy, resolved to abstain from the sacrifice. Theodota was then deprived of both food and drink for twenty-one days; but being again brought before the tribunal she confessed her faith in the Christ; and was condemned by Agrippa to cruel tortures, which included the extraction of all her teeth. She was put to death by stoning.

Theodota is commemorated by the Latin Church on September 29th.

== Butler's account ==
The hagiographer Alban Butler (1710–1773) wrote in his Lives of the Fathers, Martyrs, and Other Principal Saints under September 29,

St. Theodota, M.

TOWARDS the end of the reign of Licinius, on a Friday, in September, in the year 642 from the death of Alexander the Great, that is, of Christ 318, a persecution was raised at Philippi, not the city so called in Macedon, which was at that time comprised in the empire of Constantine, but that called Philippopolis, anciently Eumolpias, in Thrace. (Note: Constantine the Great declared openly in favour of the Christians in the West, after the defeat of Maxentius, and out of compliment to him, Licinius favoured them in the East. His colleague Maximin was a cruel persecutor; but his death, in 313, put an end to the persecution raised by Dioclesian, though it was afterwards revived in the East for a short time, when war broke out between Licinius and Constantine, in 318, and continued till the defeat of the former. Licinius seems to have begun his persecution in Thrace, where he then resided. St. Theodota received her crown in the first fury of this storm.) Agrippa, the prefect, on a certain festival of Apollo, had commanded that the whole city should offer a great sacrifice with him. Theodota, who had been formerly a harlot, was accused of refusing to conform, and being called upon by the president, answered him, that she had indeed been a grievous sinner, but could not add sin to sin, nor defile herself with a sacrilegious sacrifice. Her constancy encouraged seven hundred and fifty men (who were, perhaps, some troop of soldiers) to step forth, and professing themselves Christians, to refuse to join in the sacrifice.

Theodota was cast into prison where she lay twenty days; all which time she employed in continual prayer. Being brought to the bar, as she entered the court she burst into tears, and prayed aloud that Christ would pardon the crimes of her past life, and arm her with strength, that she might be enabled to bear with constancy and patience the cruel torments she was going to suffer. In her answers to the judge she confessed that she had been a harlot, but declared that she had become a Christian, though unworthy to bear that sacred name. Agrippa commanded her to be cruelly scourged. The pagans who stood near her, ceased not to exhort her to free herself from torments by obeying the president but for one moment. But Theodota remained constant, and under the lashes cried out: “I will never abandon the true God, nor sacrifice to lifeless statues.”

The president ordered her to be hoisted upon the rack, and her body to be torn with an iron comb. Under these torments she earnestly prayed to Christ, and said: “I adore you, O Christ, and thank you, because you have made me worthy to suffer this for your name.” The judge, enraged at her resolution and patience, said to the executioner: “Tear her flesh again with the iron comb; then pour vinegar and salt into her wounds.” She said: “So little do I fear your torments, that I entreat you to increase them to the utmost, that I may find mercy and attain to the greater crown.” Agrippa next commanded the executioners to pluck out her teeth, which they violently pulled out one by one with pincers. The judge at length condemned her to be stoned. She was led out of the city, and, during her martyrdom, prayed thus: “O Christ, as you showed favour to Rahab the harlot, and received the good thief; so turn not your mercy from me.” In this manner she died, and her soul ascended triumphant to heaven in the year of the Greeks 642. See her authentic Chaldaic Acts, published by Stephen Assemani, Acta Martyr. Occid. t. 2, p. 221.

== Sources ==
- Butler, Alban (1866), The Lives of the Fathers, Martyrs, and Other Principal Saints, vol. 9, James Duffy This article incorporates text from this source, which is in the public domain.
- Smith Lewis, Agnes (2012) [1900], Select Narratives of Holy Women: Translation: From the Syro-Antiochene Or Sinai Palimpsest, Cambridge University Press, ISBN 9781108043182 This article incorporates text from this source, which is in the public domain.
