= Confessor of the Faith =

Title given to some Christian saints

Confessor of the Faith is a title used in some Christian traditions, particularly in the Catholic Church and Eastern Orthodox Church, for Christians who publicly professed their faith during periods of Christian persecution and therefore had to suffer imprisonment, exile, torture, mutilation or other penalties without undergoing martyrdom. Such individuals are called confessors (Latin: confessores). In later usage, especially after the decline of major persecutions, the title was also applied to saints distinguished by heroic virtue and public witness to the faith, including popes, bishops, abbots, kings and hermits were also counted among the confessors.

With the spread of Christianity and the decrease in persecution of Christians in the 5th century, this designation was also given to those Christians who lived a holy life, such as the English king Edward the Confessor.

== Etymology ==
The word confessor is derived from the Latin confiteri, 'to confess; to profess'. In the early church, it was a title of honour, designating those individuals who had confessed Christ publicly in time of persecution and had been punished with imprisonment, torture, exile, or labour in the mines, remaining faithful until the end of their lives. The title thus distinguished them from the martyrs, who were those that had undergone death for their faith. Among writers, Cyprian is the first in whose works it occurs.

== Western Christianity ==
In the Catholic Church, the title is given to saints and the beatified who were not martyred. Historically, the title Confessor was given to those who had suffered persecution and torture for the faith but not to the point of martyrdom. As Christianity emerged as the dominant religion in Europe by the fifth century, persecutions became rare, and the title was given to male saints who lived a holy life and died in peace. Perhaps the best-known individual associated with the title is the English king Edward the Confessor. It is possible for confessors to have another title or even two other titles, for example, Bishop and Confessor; Pope and Confessor; or Bishop, Confessor, and Doctor of the Church, among others: Jerome is known as Priest, Confessor, Theologian, Historian and Doctor of the Church.

The term confessor is also used for non-canonised Catholics who died under persecution, not being executed. For example: the Tudor bishop, Cuthbert Tunstall "became one of the eleven confessor-bishops who died prisoners for the Faith."

== Eastern Christianity ==
In the Eastern Orthodox Church, the title Confessor refers to a saint who has witnessed to the faith and suffered for it, but not to the point of death, and thus is distinguished from a martyr. For example, Nikephoros I of Constantinople, who was banished to the monastery of Saint Theodore for his support of iconodules, is revered as a confessor.

A confessor who is also a clergyman may be referred to as a hieroconfessor. A confessor who is also a monastic (monk or nun) may be referred to as a venerable confessor.

== See also ==
- Christianity in late antiquity
- Early Christianity
- List of Confessors
- List of Eastern Orthodox saint titles
- Martyr of charity, one who dies as a result of charitable acts but not from persecution.
- Passion-bearer
- Virgin (title)
