= Abraham of Ephesus =

Saint Abraham of Ephesus

Archbishop of Ephesus, Venerable
- Venerated in: Eastern Orthodox Church; Roman Catholic Church
- Feast: 28 October

Abraham of Ephesus was a 6th-century Archbishop of Ephesus in the Byzantine Empire and monastery founder. He is venerated as a saint by the Eastern Orthodox Church and Roman Catholic Church. His feast day is commemorated on 28 October.

== Legacy ==
During his life as bishop he played an important role in the foundation of a monastery in Constantinople and another in Jerusalem.

Two homilies, important for the knowledge and understanding of the ancient Byzantine liturgy, have reached us: One on the feast of the Annunciation and one on the feast of the Presentation of Jesus at the Temple.

=== Abrahamite monks ===
The Abrahamite monks or Abrahamite martyrs were an order of monks in a monastery at Constantinople, founded by Abraham of Ephesus, who were martyred around 835 during the iconoclast persecutions of Emperor Theophilus. They are regarded as saints by the Roman Catholic Church, with a feast day on 8 July as well as in the Eastern Orthodox Church with a feast day on 6 July.

== Sources ==
- Holweck, F. G. A Biographical Dictionary of the Saints. St. Louis, MO: B. Herder Book Co. 1924.
