= Passion bearer =

Person who faces their death in a Christ-like manner

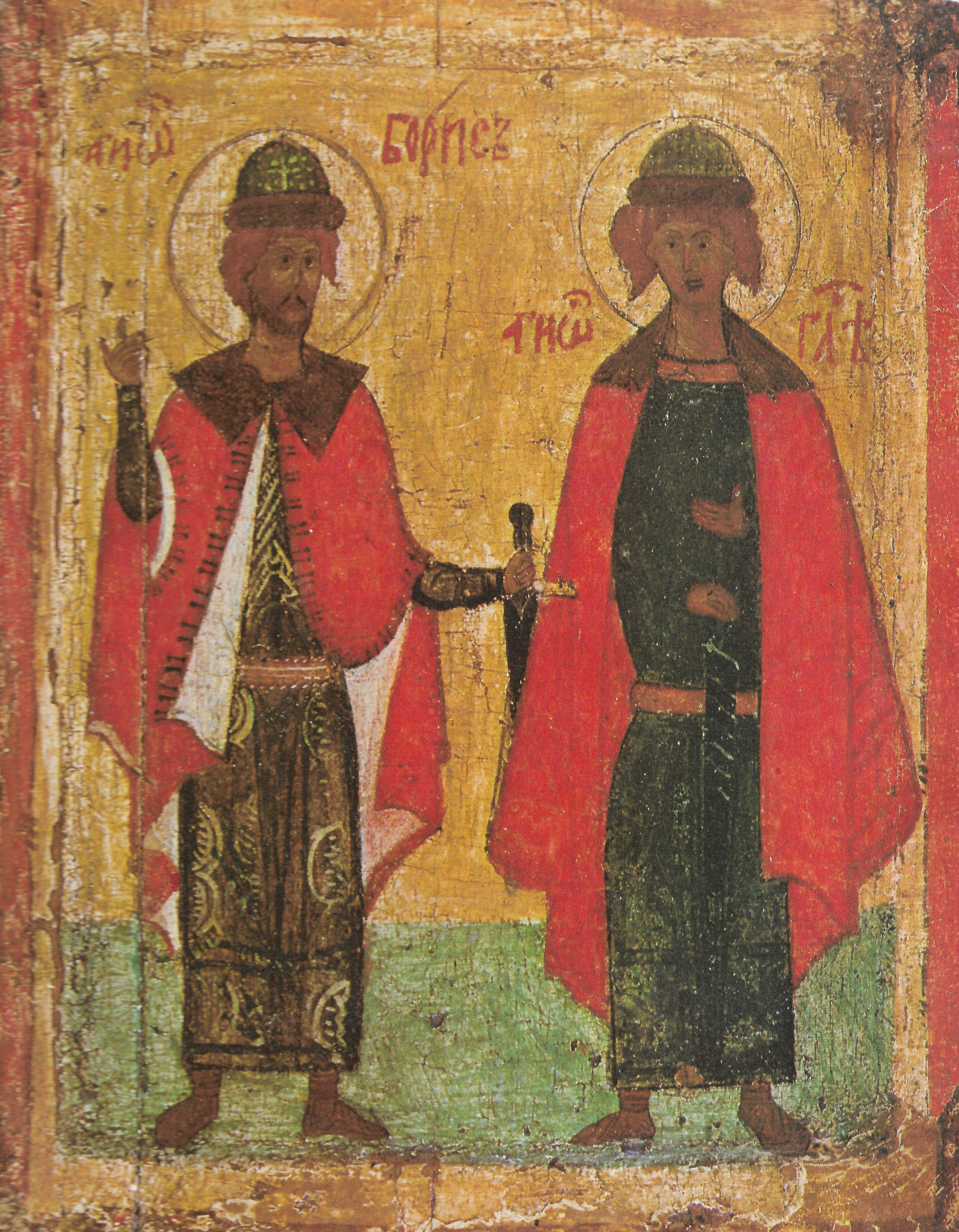
Russian icon of the passion bearers Saints Boris and Gleb (14th century, Tretyakov Gallery, Moscow)

In Eastern Christianity, a passion bearer (Russian: страстотéрпец, romanized: strastoterpets, IPA: [strəstɐˈtʲɛrpʲɪts]) is the holder of one of the various customary saint titles used in commemoration at divine services when honouring their feast on the Church Calendar; it is not generally used by Latin Catholics, but it is used within the Eastern Catholic Churches.

== Definition ==
The term can be defined as a person who faces their death in a Christ-like manner. Unlike martyrs, passion bearers are not directly killed for their faith, though they hold to that faith with piety and true love of God.

== In Eastern Orthodoxy ==
Notable passion bearers include the brothers Boris and Gleb, Alexander Schmorell (executed for being a member of the White Rose student movement which wrote and distributed pamphlets which denounced Nazism), Mother Maria Skobtsova, and the entire imperial family of Russia, executed by the Bolsheviks on 17 July 1918.

== Byzantine Catholicism ==
Following the collapse of the Soviet Union, the surviving Russian Catholics, many of whom were directly connected to the Greek Catholic community of Dominican Sisters founded in August 1917 by Mother Catherine Abrikosova, began to appear in the open. At the same time, the martyrology of the Russian Greek Catholic Church began to be investigated.

In 2001, Exarch Leonid Feodorov was beatified during a Byzantine Rite Divine Liturgy offered in Lviv by Pope John Paul II.

In 2003, a positio towards the Causes for Beatification of six others of those whom Fr. Christopher Zugger has termed, "The Passion bearers of the Russian Catholic Exarchate": Fabijan Abrantovich, Anna Abrikosova, Igor Akulov, Potapy Emelianov, Halina Jętkiewicz, and Andrzej Cikoto; was submitted to the Holy See's Congregation for the Causes of Saints by the Bishops of the Catholic Church in Russia.

== List of passion bearers ==
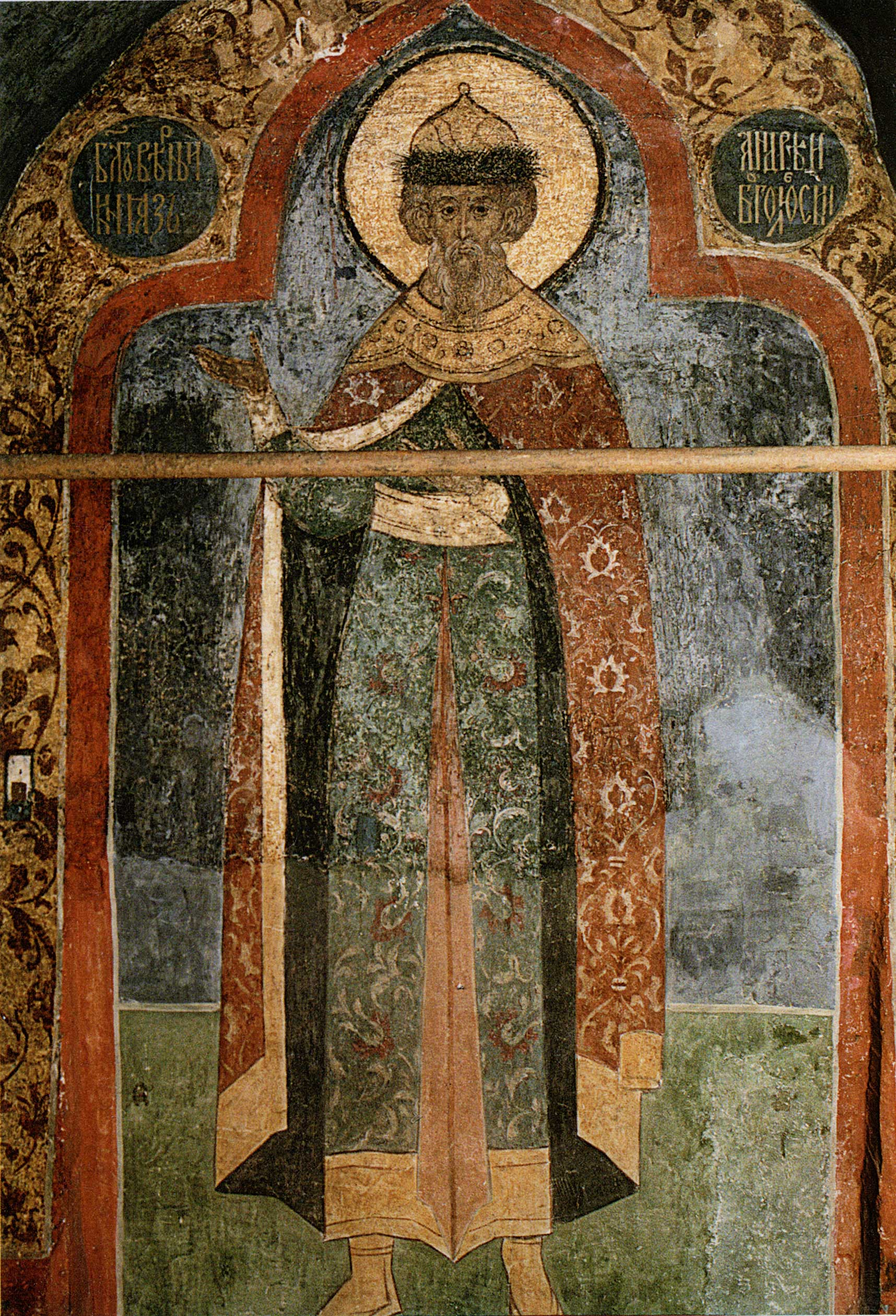
16th-century Russian icon of Andrey Bogolyubsky, Grand Prince of Vladimir (r. 1157–1174)

=== Before 1054 ===
- Rastislav of Moravia
- Boris and Gleb
- Doulas
- George the Hungarian

=== After 1054 ===
- Andrey Bogolyubsky

==== 20th century ====
- Eugene Botkin
- Romanov Imperial Family
  - Emperor Nicholas II
  - Empress Alexandra Feodorovna
  - Grand Duchess Olga Nikolaevna
  - Grand Duchess Tatiana Nikolaevna
  - Grand Duchess Maria Nikolaevna
  - Grand Duchess Anastasia Nikolaevna
  - Grand Prince Alexei
- Alexander Schmorell
- Maria Skobtsova

== See also ==
- Christian martyr
- List of Eastern Orthodox saint titles
- List of Eastern Orthodox saints
