= September 10 (Eastern Orthodox liturgics) =

Day in the Eastern Orthodox liturgical calendar

Eastern Orthodox liturgical calendar
September 9	September 10	September 11
September 10 O.S. ≍ September 23 N.S. September 10 N.S ≍ August 28 O.S.

An Eastern Orthodox cross

September 10 in Eastern Orthodox liturgical calendars is a feast day and a day of commemoration of saints and martyrs. Although some Orthodox churches use the Revised Julian Calendar and others use the traditional Julian calendar, the fixed commemorations for their respective September 10 are broadly the same, no matter which calendar is used. (Note: Despite the dates being the same, the days to which they refer typically differ by 13 days. The notation Old Style or O.S. is sometimes used to indicate a date in the traditional Julian Calendar (the "Old Calendar"). The notation New Style or N.S. indicates a date in the Revised Julian calendar (the "New Calendar").)

== Feasts ==
- Afterfeast of the Nativity of the Theotokos.

== Saints ==
- Holy Apostles Apelles, Lucius (of Laodicea in Syria, not the Evangelist), and Clement, of the Seventy (1st century)
- Martyr Barypsabas in Dalmatia (2nd century) (Note: A hermit from the East, he was martyred in Dalmatia. A tradition relates that Barypsabas took to Rome a vessel containing some of the precious blood which flowed from the side of our Lord when He was on the cross.)
- Martyrs Menodora, Metrodora, and Nymphodora at Nicomedia (305-311) (Note: "In Bithynia, the holy virgins Menodora, Metrodora, and Nymphodora, sisters. Under the emperor Maximian and the governor Fronto, they were crowned with martyrdom, and went to eternal glory.")
- Martyr Ia and 9,000 with her in Persia (363) (see also: August 4, August 11, and September 11)
- Saint Eudokia the Child. (Note: The memory of this young girl is recorded in the Jerusalemitic Canonarion, page 107, and is absent from the Synaxaria. Note also, there is an entry on August 4 for "Martyr Eudokia of Anatolia, in Persia, by beheading", which notes that there is some confusion in the Synaxaria between this Eudokia (Eudok-ia) and the martyr Ia.)
- Saint Pulcheria the Empress (453) (see also: February 17) (Note: "At Constantinople, St. Pulcheria, empress and virgin, distinguished by her piety and zeal for religion.")
- Venerable Peter and Paul, Bishops of Nicaea (9th century)

== Pre-Schism Western saints ==
- Martyrs Nemesian, Felix, Lucius, another Felix, Litteus, Polyanus, Victor, Jader, Dativus and Companions (257) (Note: Nine bishops of Numidia in North Africa who with numerous other clergy and laypeople were condemned to slavery in the marble quarries of Sigum where they ended their lives. A letter of St Cyprian addressed to them still exists.) (Note: "In Africa, the birthday of the holy bishops Nemesian, Felix, Lucius, another Felix, Litteus, Polyan, Victor, Jader, Dativus, and others. As a violent persecution was breaking out under Valerian and Gallienus, they were at their first courageous confession of Christ beaten with rods, then put in irons, and being sent to dig in the metal mines, they terminated their combat and glorious confession.")
- Saint Agapius (Agapitus), Bishop of Novara (447)
- Saint Veranus of Vence, son of St Eucherius of Lyons, he became a monk at Lérins, then later Bishop of Vence in the south of France (c. 480)
- Saint Finnian of Movilla (Findbarr, Winnin), Abbot, in Ulster (579) (Note: Born near Stangford Lough in Ireland, he became a monk in Scotland. He was the founder and first Abbot of Moville in Co. Down.) (Note: "ST. FlNIAN, or FlNDBAR, who is also called FlNAN, and by the Britons WlNNlN, was a native of Ireland, and of noble birth. He received his first education from Colman, a holy Bishop, and afterwards went over to Britain. Like St. Tigernake, he is called a disciple of Monennius, which probably means that he became a scholar of St. Ninian's great monastery at Whithern, in Strathclyde. On his return to Ireland he became Abbot of Maghbile, and is also called a Bishop. He was greatly famed for his sanctity and extraordinary miraculous gifts. Among other prodigies, he is said to have raised four persons to life. He was anciently honoured as the Patron of the Province of Ulster.")
- Saint Salvius, Bishop of Albi in Gaul, Confessor (584) (Note: A lawyer who became a monk and abbot, then a hermit and finally Bishop of Albi in France (574-584). He died while tending the sick during an epidemic.)
- Saint Candida the Younger, a married woman in Naples who hallowed herself as a wife and as a mother (586)
- Saint Theodard of Maastricht (c. 670) (Note: A disciple of St Remaclus at Malmédy-Stavelot in Belgium and his successor as Abbot (653) and Bishop of Maastricht (663). He was murdered by robbers in the forest of Bienwald near Speyer in Germany on a journey undertaken in defence of his church.) (Note: "At Liege, in Belgium, St. Theodard, bishop and martyr, who laid down his life for his flock, and after his death was renowned for the gift of miracles.")
- Saint Autbert, Bishop of Avranches, founder of the Monastery of Mont-St-Michel on the Normandy coast (c. 709)
- Saint Frithestan, a disciple of St Grimbald, he was consecrated Bishop of Winchester in England by St Plegmund (933) (Note: He was bishop for twenty-three years, loved the poor and prayed much for the departed.) (Note: "ST. FRITHESTANE is said to have been a disciple f St. Grimbald. His eminent virtues led to his appointment as Bishop of Winchester, and he was one of seven who were consecrated on the same day in the year 909, by Archbishop St. Plegmund, to fill the Sees which were then vacant. He ruled his diocese for the long period of twenty-three years, and is reported to have been a man of great sanctity of life, though no record of his acts has come down to our time. A year before his blessed death he consecrated St. Bristan as his successor, and retired to pass his last days in solitude and prayer.")
- Saint Peter Martinez (Peter of Mozonzo), a monk at the monastery of St Mary of Mozonzo, later Abbot of St Martin in Compostella, and finally (c 986) Archbishop (c. 1000) (Note: "At Compostella, St. Peter, bishop, who was celebrated for his many virtues and miracles.") (Note: See: (in Spanish) Pedro de Mezonzo. Wikipedia. (Spanish Wikipedia).)

== Post-Schism Orthodox saints ==
- Venerable Esaias, founder of the Kykkos Monastery in Cyprus (12th century)
- Venerable Paul the Obedient, of the Kiev Caves (13th-14th century)
- Saint Iosaph, monk, of Kubensk in Vologda (1453)
- Saint Cassian, Abbot of Spaso-Kamenny and White Lake Monasteries (1469)
- Saint Theodoritus, Archbishop of Ryazan and Murom (1617) (Note: See: (in Russian) Феодорит (архиепископ Рязанский). Википедии. (Russian Wikipedia).)
- Venerable Saint Tikhon (Golenkov) of Kapsala, Mount Athos, the spiritual father of St. Paisios the Athonite (1968) (Note: He was glorified by the Ecumenical Patriarchate on February 11, 2026. The official communiqué of the Ecumenical Patriarchate was as follows: (in Greek)"Τό Ἱερόν Σῶμα ἀπεφάσισεν ὁμοφώνως τήν κατάταξιν εἰς τό ἁγιολόγιον τῆς Ἐκκλησίας τῶν ὁσιακῆς βιοτῆς Ἁγιορειτῶν Ἱερομονάχου Τύχωνος, τοῦ ἐν τῷ ἐν τῇ Σκήτῃ Καψάλας Ἱερῷ Σταυρονικητιανῷ Κελλίῳ τοῦ Τιμίου Σταυροῦ ἀσκήσαντος, καί μοναχοῦ Γεωργίου, τοὐπίκλην Χατζη-Γεώργη, τοῦ ἐκ Καππαδοκίας καταγομένου καί ἐν Κωνσταντινουπόλει κοιμηθέντος.") (Note: The question of the glorification of the Russian Athonite elder Tikhon (Golenkov) was also discussed in 2017 at the Moscow Theological Academy at the Trinity-St. Sergius Lavra. The discussion occurred as part of the academy’s "Day of the Memory of Two Elders: St. Paisios the Athonite and Archimandrite Kirill (Pavlov)", in which the new book Athonite Elder Tikhon (Golenkov) (in Russian) was presented. The hope was expressed that the Church would support the glorification of this great twentieth-century elder, reports a correspondent of the site 'Russian Athos'. Elder Tikhon was born in 1884 in the Russian Empire, in the village of Novaya Mikhaylovka (in present-day Volgograd). At the age of 24 he arrived to Mount Athos where he spent the remaining sixty years of his life in unceasing prayer and repentance. He is an example to all of a true Christian and monk who already in his lifetime acquired the Holy Spirit, and his relics have been shown to be incorrupt. (in Russian): Старец Тихон (Голенков) Святогорец (1884–1968).)

=== New martyrs and confessors ===
- New Hieromartyr Meletius (Fedyunev), Hieromonk, of Kuzhba (Komi) (1937)
- New Hieromartyr Gabriel (Yatsik), Archimandrite, of Donskoy Monastery, Moscow (1937)
- New Hieromartyrs Ismael Kudryavtsev, Eugene Popov, John Popov, Constantine Kolpetsky, Peter Grigoriev, Basil Maximov, Gleb Apukhtin, Basil Malinin, John Sofronov, Peter Yurkov, Nicholas Pavlinov, Palladius Popov, Priests (1937)
- Martyr Symeon Turkin (1937)
- Virgin-Martyr Tatiana Grimblit (1937) (Note: See: (in Russian) Гримблит, Татьяна Николаевна. Википедии. (Russian Wikipedia).)
- New Hieromartyr Warus (Shmarin), Bishop of Lipetsk (1938) (Note: See: (in Russian) Уар (Шмарин). Википедии. (Russian Wikipedia).)
- New Martyrs of Rmanj. (Note: The Martyrs of Rmanj were monks and clergy from St. Nicholas Monastery in Rmanj whose remains were discovered during renovation work around the monastery church in 2022, having been buried near the church foundations and entrance as witnesses to the monastery’s difficult history, and are now preserved in a reliquary in the monastery.)

== Other commemorations ==
- Translation of the relics of St. Egvin, Bishop of Worcester.
- Translation of the relics of St. Ethelwold, Bishop of Winchester.
- Synaxis of the Icon of the Theotokos "Trikeriotissas" (1825)
- Synaxis of the Theotokos "Orchomeniotissa" ("Panagia Skripou") (1943)
- Synaxis of the Saints of Lipetsk. (Note: See: (in Russian) Собор Липецких святых. Википедии. (Russian Wikipedia).)

== Icon gallery ==
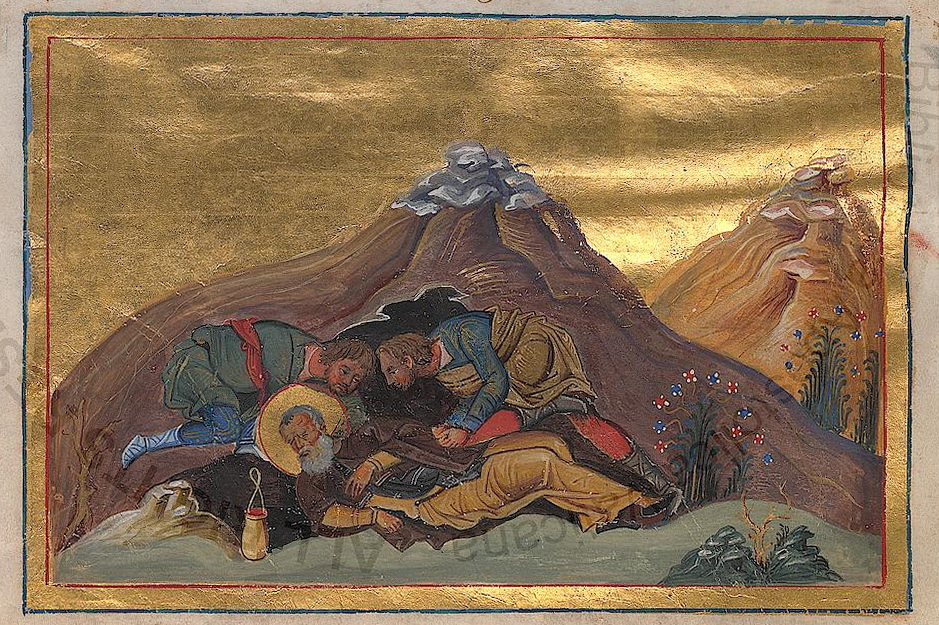
Martyr Barypsabas in Dalmatia.
(Menologion of Basil II, 10th century).

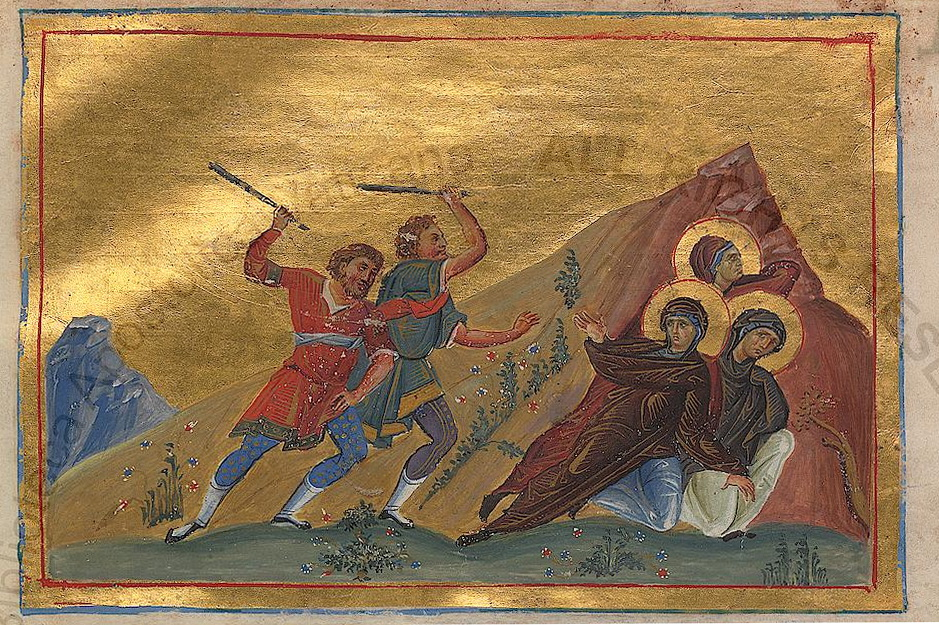
Martyrs Menodora, Metrodora, and Nymphodora at Nicomedia.
(Menologion of Basil II, 10th century).

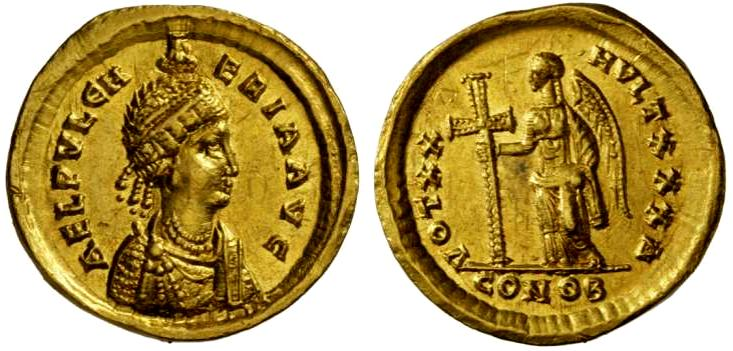
Coin of Aelia Pulcheria.

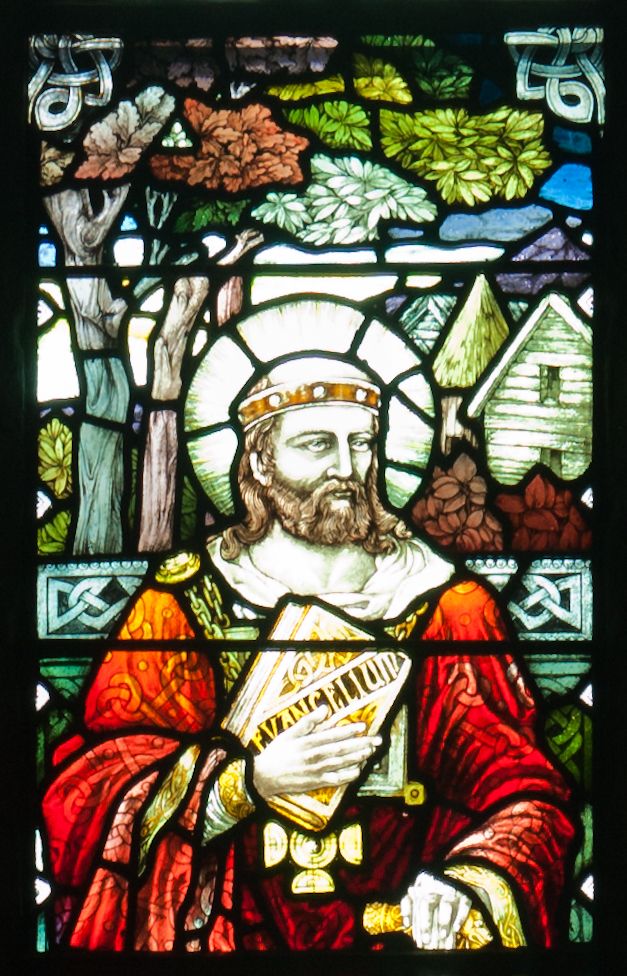
St. Finnian of Movilla.

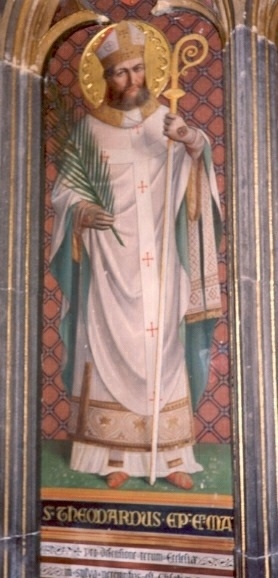
St. Theodard of Maastricht.

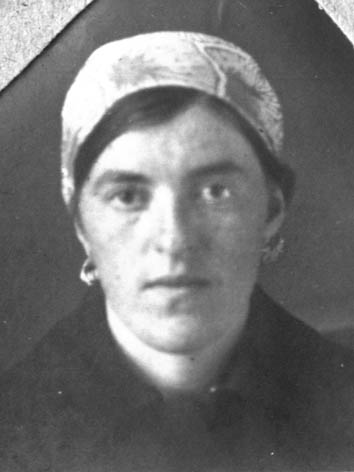
Virgin-Martyr Tatiana Grimblit.

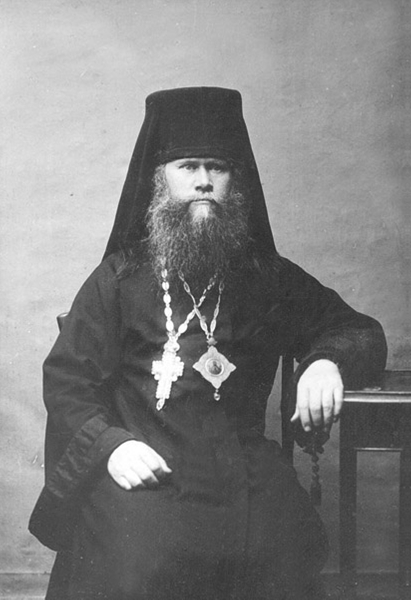
New Hieromartyr Warus (Shmarin), Bishop of Lipetsk.

== Sources ==
- September 10/September 23. Orthodox Calendar (PRAVOSLAVIE.RU).
- September 23 / September 10. HOLY TRINITY RUSSIAN ORTHODOX CHURCH (A parish of the Patriarchate of Moscow).
- September 10. OCA - The Lives of the Saints.
- The Autonomous Orthodox Metropolia of Western Europe and the Americas (ROCOR). St. Hilarion Calendar of Saints for the year of our Lord 2004. St. Hilarion Press (Austin, TX). pp. 67–68.
- The Tenth Day of the Month of September. Orthodoxy in China.
- September 10. Latin Saints of the Orthodox Patriarchate of Rome.
- The Roman Martyrology. Transl. by the Archbishop of Baltimore. Last Edition, According to the Copy Printed at Rome in 1914. Revised Edition, with the Imprimatur of His Eminence Cardinal Gibbons. Baltimore: John Murphy Company, 1916. pp. 278–279.
- Rev. Richard Stanton. A Menology of England and Wales, or, Brief Memorials of the Ancient British and English Saints Arranged According to the Calendar, Together with the Martyrs of the 16th and 17th Centuries. London: Burns & Oates, 1892. pp. 443–445.

Greek Sources

- Great Synaxaristes: (in Greek) 10 ΣΕΠΤΕΜΒΡΙΟΥ. ΜΕΓΑΣ ΣΥΝΑΞΑΡΙΣΤΗΣ.
- (in Greek) Συναξαριστής. 10 Σεπτεμβρίου. ECCLESIA.GR. (H ΕΚΚΛΗΣΙΑ ΤΗΣ ΕΛΛΑΔΟΣ).
- (in Greek) 10/09/2026. Ορθόδοξος Συναξαριστής.

Russian Sources

- (in Russian) 23 сентября (10 сентября). Православная Энциклопедия под редакцией Патриарха Московского и всея Руси Кирилла (электронная версия). (Orthodox Encyclopedia - Pravenc.ru).
- (in Russian) 10 сентября по старому стилю / 23 сентября по новому стилю. Русская Православная Церковь - Православный церковный календарь на 2026 год.
