= September 24 (Eastern Orthodox liturgics) =

Day in the Eastern Orthodox liturgical calendar

Eastern Orthodox liturgical calendar
| September 23 | September 24 | September 25 |
September 24 O.S. ≍ October 7 N.S. September 24 N.S ≍ September 11 O.S.

An Eastern Orthodox cross

September 24 in Eastern Orthodox liturgical calendars is a feast day and a day of commemoration of saints and martyrs. Although some Orthodox churches use the Revised Julian Calendar and others use the traditional Julian calendar, the fixed commemorations for their respective September 24 are broadly the same, no matter which calendar is used. (Note: Despite the dates being the same, the days to which they refer typically differ by 13 days. The notation Old Style or O.S. is sometimes used to indicate a date in the traditional Julian Calendar (the "Old Calendar"). The notation New Style or N.S. indicates a date in the Revised Julian calendar (the "New Calendar").)

== Saints ==
- Protomartyr and Equal-to-the-Apostles Thekla of Iconium (1st century) (Note: Name days celebrated today include: Thecla, Thekla (Θέκλα).)
- Saint Persa (Persis, Persida). (Note: Her memory is recorded in the Synaxarion of Delahaye, on the 23rd and 24th of September, and also in the Parisian Codex 3041 on the 24th of September, with the hymn: (in Greek) «Μικρὸν θαλαττεύουσα Πέρσα, πρὸς χρόνον, μέγαν πρὸς ὅρμον οὐρανοῦ προσωρμήσω»..)
- Venerable Coprius of Palestine, monk (530)

== Pre-Schism Western saints ==
- Saint Anathalon (Anatolius), fhe first Bishop of Milan (1st century) (Note: The first Bishop of Milan in Italy, he was sent there by the Apostle Barnabas whose disciple he was. As first Bishop of Milan he preached Christ to the surrounding area, including Brescia, where he reposed.)
- Saints Andochius, Thyrsus and Felix, marytrs in Gaul (2nd century) (Note: Andochius, a priest, and Thyrsus, a deacon in Smyrna, were sent to what is now France by St Polycarp. They settled in Autun where they converted their host, a rich merchant, by name Felix. All three were martyred and were venerated throughout Gaul.) (Note: "At Autun, the birthday of the holy martyrs, Andochius, priest, Thyrsus, deacon, and Felix, who were sent from the East by blessed Polycarp, bishop of Smyrna, to preach in Gaul, where they were most severely scourged, hanged up a whole day by the hands, and cast into the fire. Remaining uninjured, they had their necks broken with heavy bars, and thus won a most glorious crown.")
- Saint Rusticus, Bishop of Clermont in Auvergne in France (446) (Note: "At Clermont, in Auvergne, the departure out of this life of St. Rusticus, bishop and confessor.")
- Saint Geremarus (Germer), founder of Saint-Germer-de-Fly Abbey (c. 658) (Note: Born in Beauvais in the north of France, with the consent of his saintly wife he became a monk at the monastery of Pentale, where he later became abbot. He later lived as a hermit in a cave nearby. In 655 he founded the monastery of Flay, between Beauvais and Rouen, which became known as Saint-Germer.) (Note: "In the diocese of Beauvais, St. Geremarus, abbot.")
- Saints Chuniald and Gislar, born in Ireland, they enlightened the south of Germany and Austria with St Rupert of Salzburg (7th century)
- Saint Gerard Sagredo (Gerard of Csanád), Apostle of Hungary (1046) (Note: Apostle of Hungary, where he is venerated as St Collert. Born in Venice, he was a monk and Abbot of San Giorgio Maggiore. On a pilgrimage to Palestine he was stopped while travelling through Hungary by King Stephen and persuaded to stay. He became the first Bishop of Csanad. Gerard worked zealously, but during the pagan reaction after St Stephen he was martyred in Buda and his body was thrown into the Danube.) (Note: "In Hungary, St. Gerard, bishop and martyr, called the Apostle of the Hungarians. He belonged to the nobility of Venice, and was the first to shed upon his country the glory of martyrdom.")
- Saint Isarnus of Marseilles, Abbot (1048) (Note: Born near Toulouse in France, he became a monk and then Abbot of the Monastery of St Victor in Marseilles, which flourished under him.) (Note: See: (in French) Isarn de Marseille. Wikipédia. (French Wikipedia).)

== Post-Schism Orthodox saints ==
- Saint Abramius, first Abbot of Mirozh Monastery in Pskov (1158)
- Saints Stephen the First-Crowned (in monasticism Simon) (1224), David (13th century), and Stephen Vladislav (after 1264), of Serbia.
- Venerable Nicander, hermit of Pskov (1581) (Note: See: (in Russian) Никандр Псковский. Википедии. (Russian Wikipedia).)
- Monk-martyr Galacteon of Vologda (1612)
- Venerable New Hiero-confessor Leontius (Karpovich), Archimandrite, of Vilnius (1620) (Note: See: (in Russian) Леонтий (Карпович). Википедии. (Russian Wikipedia).)
- Saint Theodosius, Abbot, of Manyava Skete, Ukraine (1629)
- Venerable Dorothea, Schema-Nun of Kashin (1629)
- Hieromartyr Juvenaly of Alaska (1796)
- New Martyr of Alaska, Peter (Cungagnaq) the Aleut, at the hands of Roman Catholics in San Francisco (1815) (see also: December 13 - Synaxis of the First Martyrs of the American land.)
- Venerable Gabriel of Seven Lakes Monastery in Kazan, and of Pskov-Eleazar Monastery in Pskov, Schema-Archimandrite (1915)
- Venerable Silouan, Elder of St. Panteleimon Monastery, Mount Athos (1938) (Note: He was glorified in 1988 by the Ecumenical Patriarchate of Constantinople.) (see also: September 11)

=== New martyrs and confessors ===
- New Hieromartyr Basil Voskresensky, Deacon (1918)
- New Hieromartyrs Andrew Bistrov and Paul Berezin, Priests (1937)
- New Hieromartyr Vitaly (Kokorev) (1937)
- Martyrs Basil Vinogradov, Sergius Mikhailov and Spiridon Saveliev (1937)
- New Hieromartyr Nicander Grivsky, Priest (1939)

== Other commemorations ==
- Icon of the Most Holy Theotokos "Of Mirozh" (1198)
- Icon of the Most Holy Theotokos "Filerimos" in Rhodes (10th century)
- Icon of the Most Holy Theotokos "Of the Myrtle Tree" / "Myrtidiotissa" of Kythera (14th century) (Note: Other churches celebrating the Most Holy Theotokos "Myrtidiotissa" today include: Synaxis of Panagias Myrtidiotissa in Kamari, Santorini.; Synaxis of Panagias Myrtidiotissa in Naxos.; Synaxis of Panagias Myrtidiotissa in Corfu.; Synaxis of Panagias Myrsinidiou (or Myrtidiotissa) in Chios.; Synaxis of Panagias Drapaniotissa in Cephalonia.) (Note: Name days celebrated today include: Myrto, Mirto (Μυρτώ).)
- Synaxis of All Saints of Alaska - Arrival in America of the first Orthodox Mission (1794): (see also: December 13 - Synaxis of the First Martyrs of the American land.)

- Saints Herman, Juvenaly, and others.

== Icon gallery ==
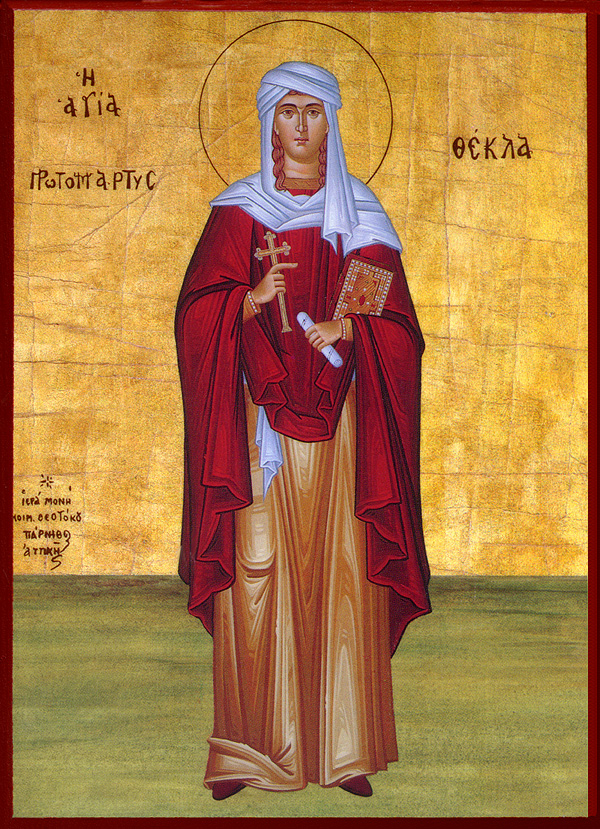
Protomartyr and Equal-to-the-Apostles Thekla of Iconium.

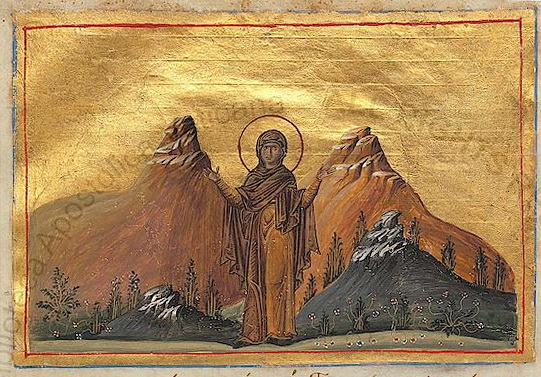
Protomartyr and Equal-to-the-Apostles Thekla of Iconium.
(Menologion of Basil II, 10th century).

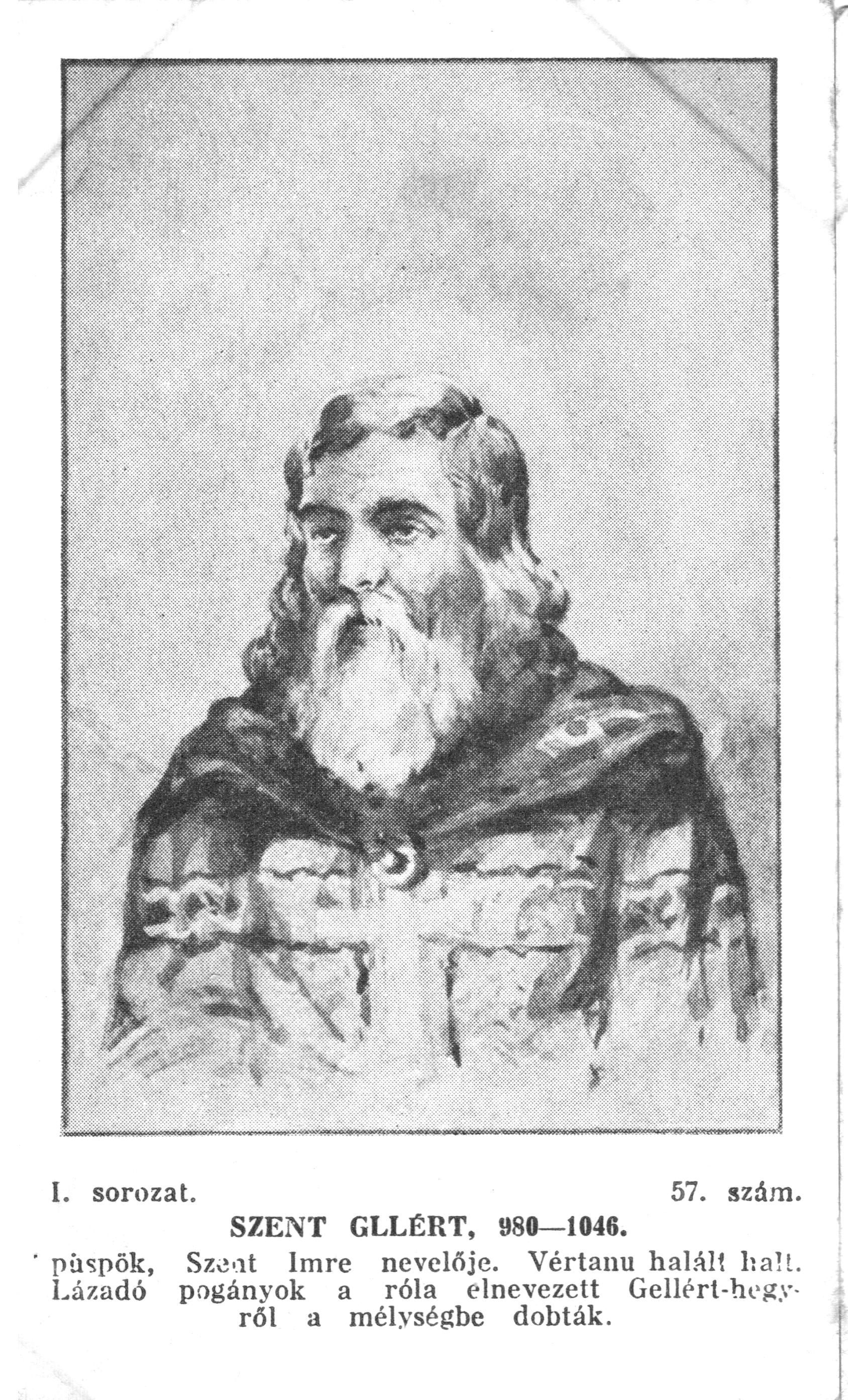
St. Gerard Sagredo (Gerard of Csanád), Apostle of Hungary.

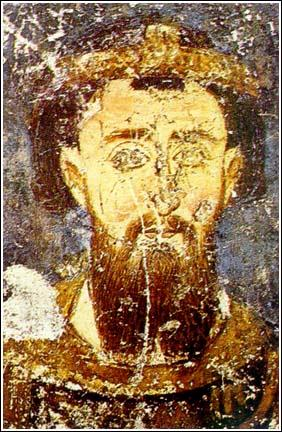
St. Stephen Nemanjić, the First-Crowned (in monasticism Simon), King of Serbia.

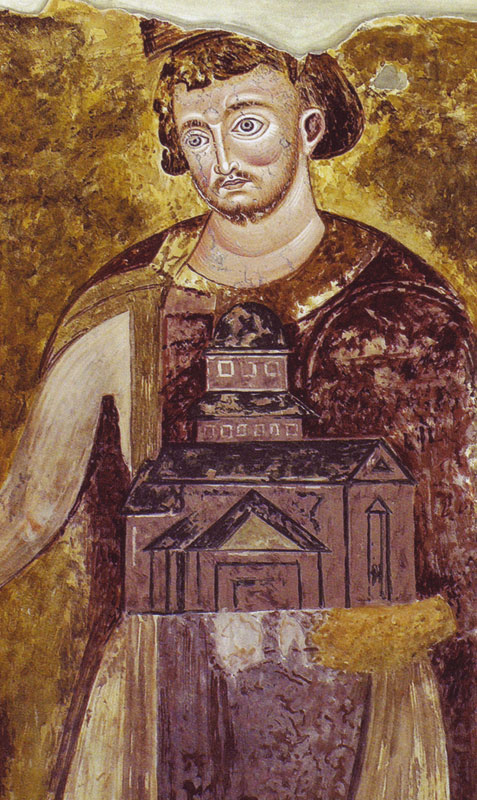
St. Stephen Vladislav, King of Serbia.

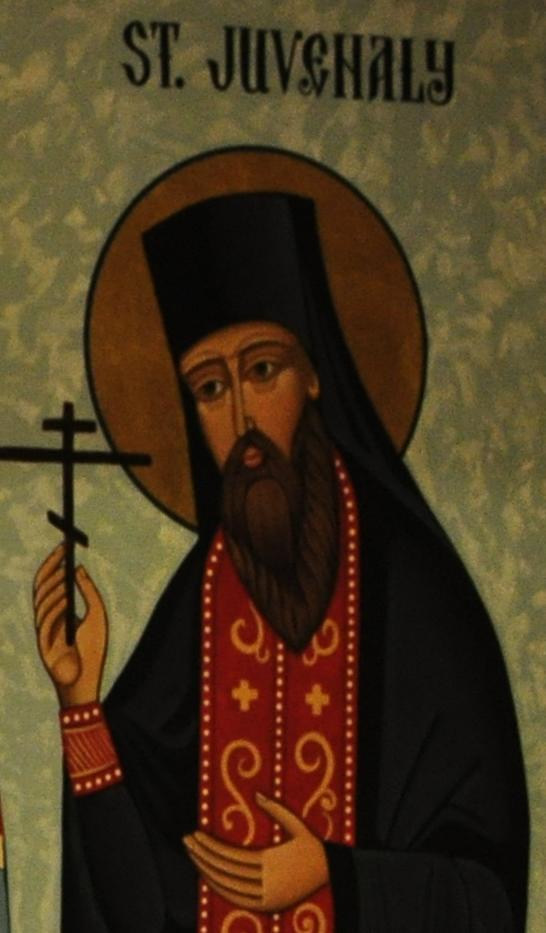
St. Juvenaly of Alaska.

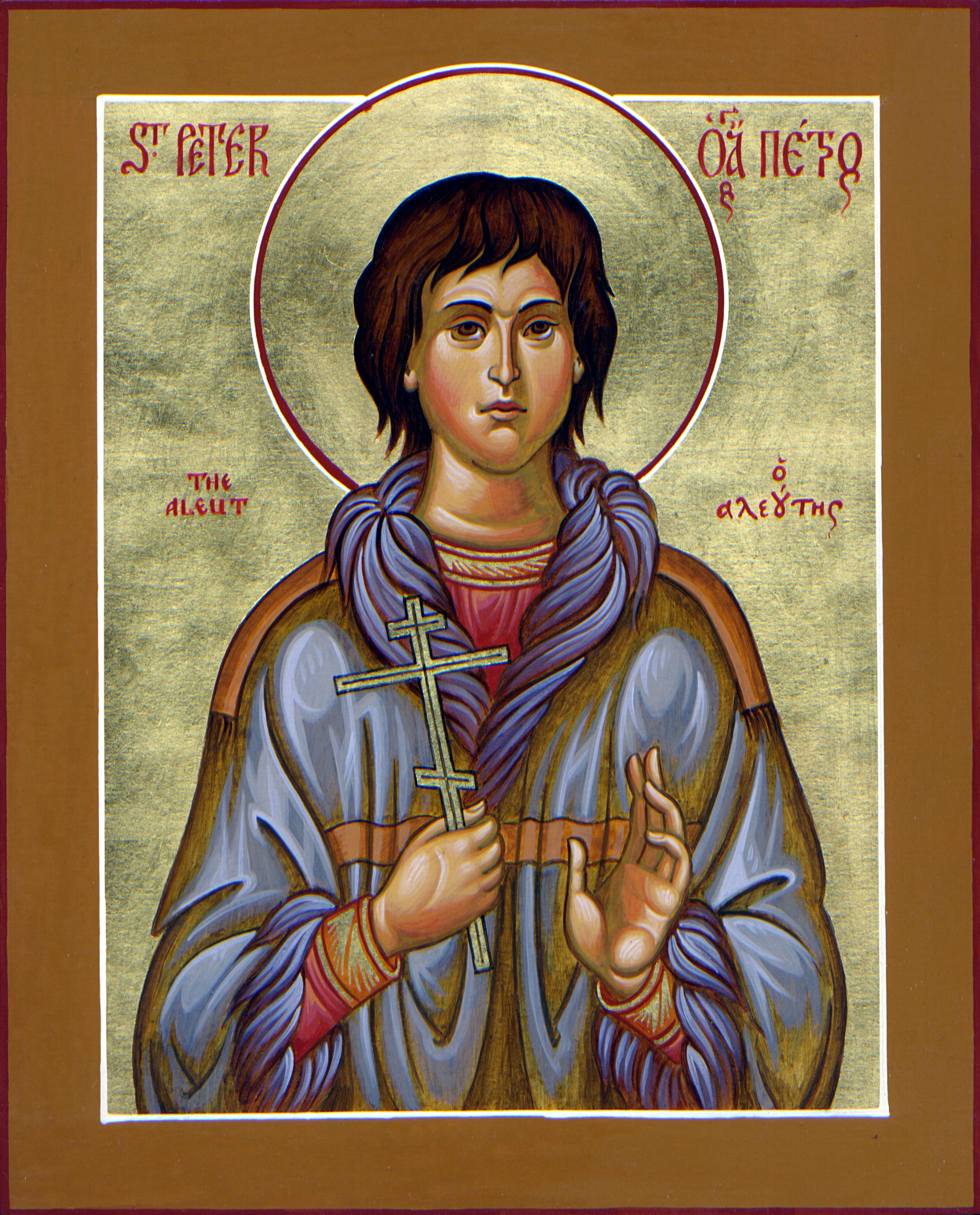
St. Peter the Aleut.

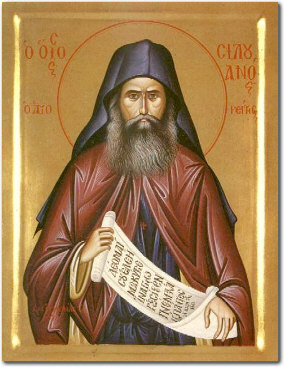
Venerable Silouan the Athonite.

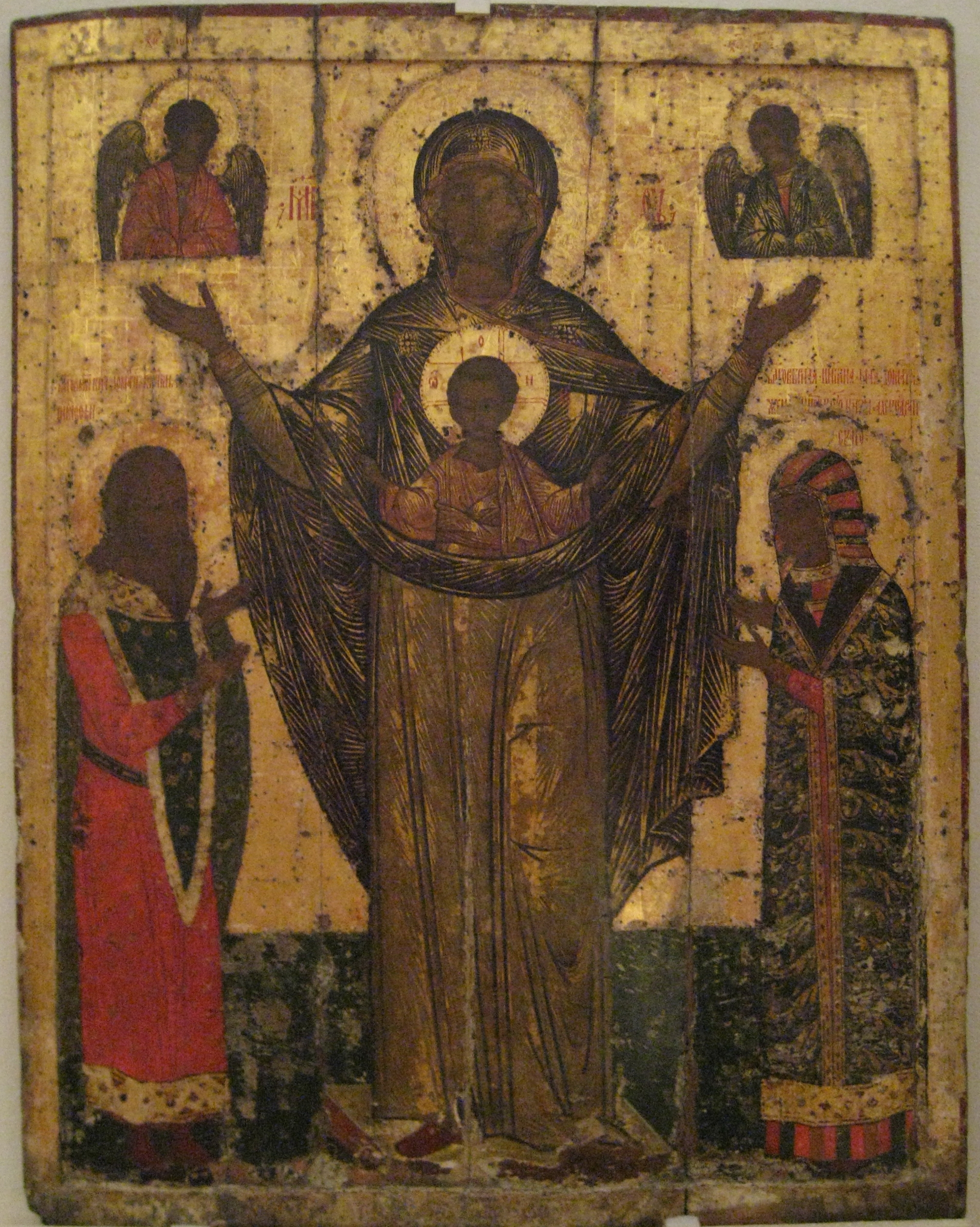
Icon of the Most Holy Theotokos "Of Mirozh" (Mirozhskaya).

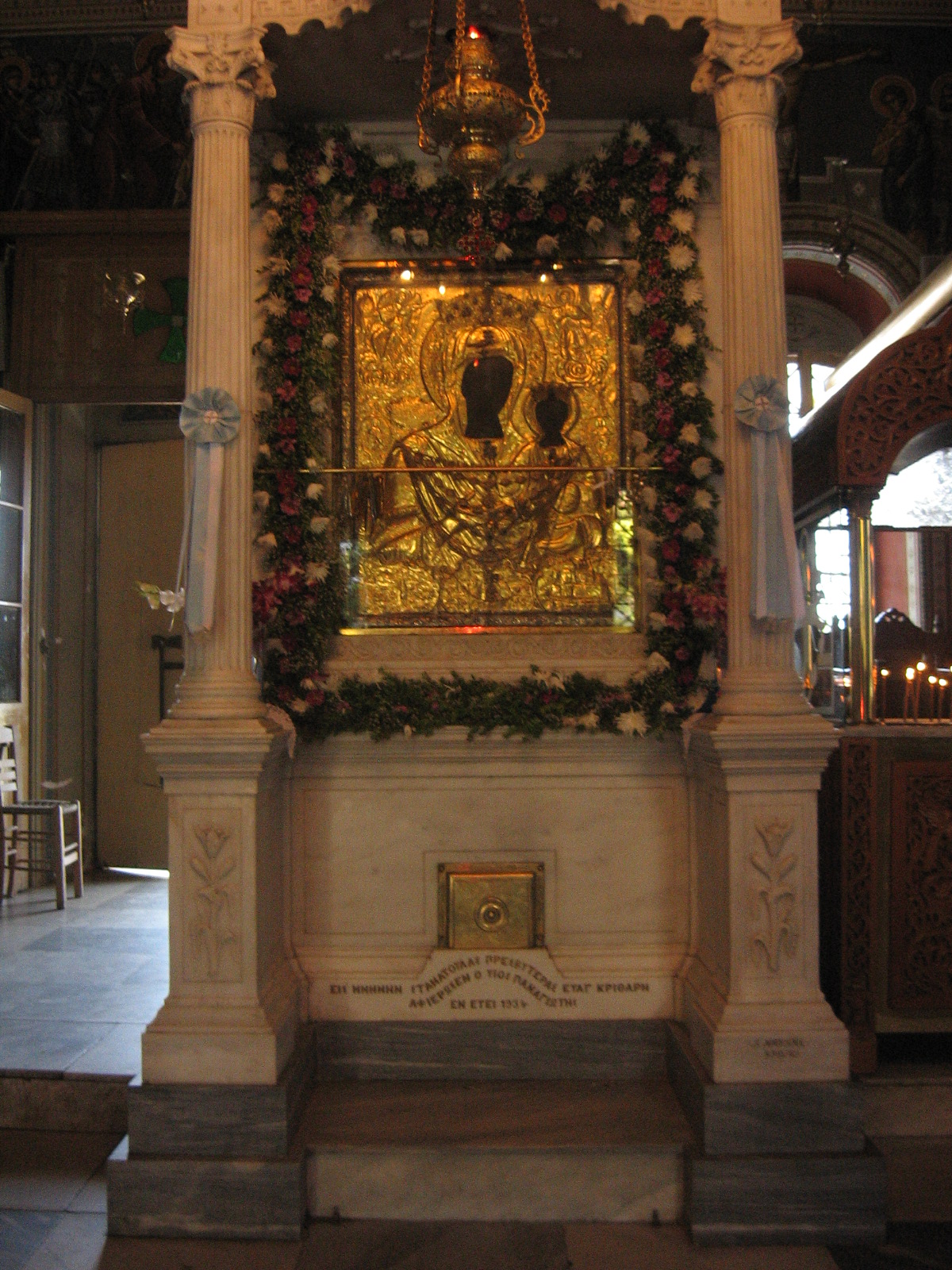
Icon of the Most Holy Theotokos "Myrtidiotissa", of Kythera.

== Sources ==
- September 24/October 7. Orthodox Calendar (PRAVOSLAVIE.RU).
- October 7 / September 24. HOLY TRINITY RUSSIAN ORTHODOX CHURCH (A parish of the Patriarchate of Moscow).
- September 24. OCA - The Lives of the Saints.
- The Autonomous Orthodox Metropolia of Western Europe and the Americas (ROCOR). St. Hilarion Calendar of Saints for the year of our Lord 2004. St. Hilarion Press (Austin, TX). p. 71.
- The Twenty-Fourth Day of the Month of September. Orthodoxy in China.
- September 24. Latin Saints of the Orthodox Patriarchate of Rome.
- The Roman Martyrology. Transl. by the Archbishop of Baltimore. Last Edition, According to the Copy Printed at Rome in 1914. Revised Edition, with the Imprimatur of His Eminence Cardinal Gibbons. Baltimore: John Murphy Company, 1916. pp. 295–296.
- Rev. Richard Stanton. A Menology of England and Wales, or, Brief Memorials of the Ancient British and English Saints Arranged According to the Calendar, Together with the Martyrs of the 16th and 17th Centuries. London: Burns & Oates, 1892. pp. 456–457.

Greek Sources

- Great Synaxaristes: (in Greek) 24 ΣΕΠΤΕΜΒΡΙΟΥ. ΜΕΓΑΣ ΣΥΝΑΞΑΡΙΣΤΗΣ.
- (in Greek) Συναξαριστής. 24 Σεπτεμβρίου. ECCLESIA.GR. (H ΕΚΚΛΗΣΙΑ ΤΗΣ ΕΛΛΑΔΟΣ).
- (in Greek) 24/09/2016. Ορθόδοξος Συναξαριστής.

Russian Sources

- (in Russian) 7 октября (24 сентября). Православная Энциклопедия под редакцией Патриарха Московского и всея Руси Кирилла (электронная версия). (Orthodox Encyclopedia - Pravenc.ru).
- (in Russian) 24 сентября по старому стилю / 7 октября по новому стилю. Русская Православная Церковь - Православный церковный календарь на 2016 год.
