= Germer =

Germer is a surname of German origin. Notable people with the surname include:

- Adolph Germer (1881–1964), American political functionary and union organizer
- Amos E. Germer (1862–1935), American politician
- Edmund Germer (1901–1987), German inventor
- Karl Germer (1885–1962), German occultist
- Lester Germer (1896–1971), American physicist
- Peter Germer (born 1949), German wrestler
- Saint Geremarus (died 658), Frankish monk and abbot
