= August 11 (Eastern Orthodox liturgics) =

Day in the Eastern Orthodox liturgical calendar

Eastern Orthodox liturgical calendar
August 10	August 11	August 12
August 11 O.S. ≍ August 24 N.S. August 11 N.S ≍ July 29 O.S.

An Eastern Orthodox cross

August 11 in Eastern Orthodox liturgical calendars is a feast day and a day of commemoration of saints and martyrs. Although some Orthodox churches use the Revised Julian Calendar and others use the traditional Julian calendar, the fixed commemorations for their respective August 11 are broadly the same, no matter which calendar is used. (Note: Despite the dates being the same, the days to which they refer typically differ by 13 days. The notation Old Style or O.S. is sometimes used to indicate a date in the traditional Julian Calendar (the "Old Calendar"). The notation New Style or N.S. indicates a date in the Revised Julian calendar (the "New Calendar").)

== Feasts ==
- Afterfeast of the Transfiguration of Our Lord, God, and Savior Jesus Christ. (Note: The hymns of the fifth day of the Afterfeast of the Transfiguration invite us to acquire the virtues and become radiant so that we may stand upon the holy mountain and behold the Lord’s Transfiguration as He shines with glory, "filling the world with light." We are also assured that those who excel in virtue "shall be made worthy of divine glory.")

== Saints ==
- Virgin-martyr Susanna and those with her (295): (Note: "S. Susanna is said to have been niece to Pope S. Caius. She obtained the palm of martyrdom in the persecution of Diocletian. Her head was struck off with a sword.")

- Hieromartyrs Gaius, Pope of Rome; (Note: He is commemorated on April 22 in the West.) the priest Gabinus; Martyrs Maximus, Claudius and his wife Praepedigna; and their sons Alexander and Cuthias.

- Holy Hieromartyr Archdeacon Euplus of Catania (304)
- Martyrs Neophytus, Zeno, Gaius, Mark, Macarius, and Gaianus, by fire.
- Martyr Ia and 9,000 with her in Persia (363) (Note: Note, there is some confusion in the Synaxaria between Eudokia of Anatolia (Eudok-ia) - August 4, and the martyr Ia.) (see also: August 4 and September 11)
- Venerable Passarion, Bishop in Palestine (428) (Note: Saint Passarion pursued asceticism in the first half of the fifth century. He founded a monastery in Jerusalem. He was “chorepiskopos” [vicar-bishop] of Palestine, and a converser with St Euthymius the Great (January 20).) (see also: May 10)

== Pre-Schism Western saints ==
- Saint Rufinus and Companions, an early bishop (Episcopus Marsorum), martyred with companions in Italy. (Note: "The same day, the martyrdom of St. Rufinus, bishop of the Marsi, and his companions, under the emperor Maximinus.")
- Saint Tiburtius, a martyr in Rome, connected with the soldier-martyr St Sebastian and was entombed at the Via Lavicana (c. 288) (Note: "AT Rome, between the two laurels situated about three miles from the city, the birthday of St. Tiburtius, martyr, under the judge Fabian, in the persecution of Diocletian. After he hard walked barefoot on burning coals and confessed Christ with increased constancy, he was put to the sword.")
- Saint Chromatius, the Prefect of Rome and father of St Tiburtius the martyr (3rd century)
- Saint Digna, a holy virgin in Todi in Umbria in Italy, lived as an anchoress in the mountains nearby during the persecution of Diocletian (4th century)
- Saint Taurinus, first Bishop of Evreux, Gaul (c. 412) (Note: "At Evreux, in France, St. Taurinus, bishop. Being made bishop of that city by the blessed pope Clement, he propagated the Christian faith by the preaching of the Gospel, and the many labors he sustained for it. Celebrated for glorious miracles, he slept in the Lord.")
- Saint Attracta (Athracht), an anchoress, first in Killaraght on Lough Gara and then in Drum near Boyle (5th century)
- Saint Equitius, founder of a number of monasteries in the province of Valeria in Italy (c. 540)
- Saint Bláán (Blane), Bishop of Bute, Scotland (c. 590) (see also: August 10)
- Saint Gaugericus (Gau, Géry), Bishop of Cambrai and Arras in France, Confessor (c. 625)
- Saint Lelia, a holy virgin connected with Limerick and Kerry; several places in Ireland are named after her.

== Post-Schism Orthodox saints ==
- Monk-martyrs Basil and Theodore, of the Kiev Caves (1098)
- Saint Theodore (in monasticism Theodosius) of the Kiev Caves, Prince of Ostrog in Volhynia (1483)
- Saint Niphon, Patriarch of Constantinople (1508)
- New Martyrs Anastasius Paneras of Asomaton, and Demetrius Begiazis of Agiasos on Lesbos, at Kasamba in Asia Minor (1816)
- Saint John, recluse of Svyatogorsk Monastery (1867)

=== New martyrs and confessors ===
- Venerable Martyr St Rafaela (Tertatska), (Rafaela of Chyhyryn), Igumenia (1926) (Note: JOURNAL NO.39 – "The session of the Holy Synod of the Ukrainian Orthodox Church presided over by His Beatitude Metropolitan Volodymyr of Kyiv and All Ukraine – HEARD the report of His Eminence Ioann, Archbishop of Kherson and Tavriysk, chairman of the Commission for Canonization of the Saints of the UOC on glorification among the ranks of the locally venerated saints of the Diocese of Cherksay of the ascetic of piety hegumeness Rafaela (Tertatska) (+24. 08. 1926)...RESOLVED: 1. To bless local glorification and veneration of hegumeness Rafaela (Tertatska).; 2. To approve icon image of the venerable martyr.; 3. To approve the presented drafts of troparion and kontakion to the venerable martyr Rafaela.; 4. To consider the remains of the venerable martyr Rafaela to be the holy relics.; 5. To commemorate of the venerable martyr Rafaela of Chyhyryn on August 11/24.; 6. To raise thanksgiving prayers to the Lord, wonderful in His saints, who revealed a new woman of prayer for our Holy Church and our people.")

== Other commemorations ==
- Commemoration of the Miracle (1716) of St. Spyridon (348) on Corfu with the Hagarenes.
- Repose of Elder Sampson (Sievers) (Edward von Sievers), Spiritual Director at Poltava's Monastery of the Exaltation of the Precious Cross (1979) (Note: See also: (in Russian) Крестовоздвиженский монастырь (Полтава). Википедии. (Russian Wikipedia).)
- Repose of Archpriest Nicholas Guryanov of Talabsk Island, in Pskov (Chudskoye) lake (2002)
- Uncovering of the relics (2011) of Venerable Theophan (Medvedev), Schema-Archimandrite of the Rykhlovsk Monastery (ru), in the Nizhyn diocese, Ukraine (1977) (see also: January 5 - Feast Day)

== Icon gallery ==
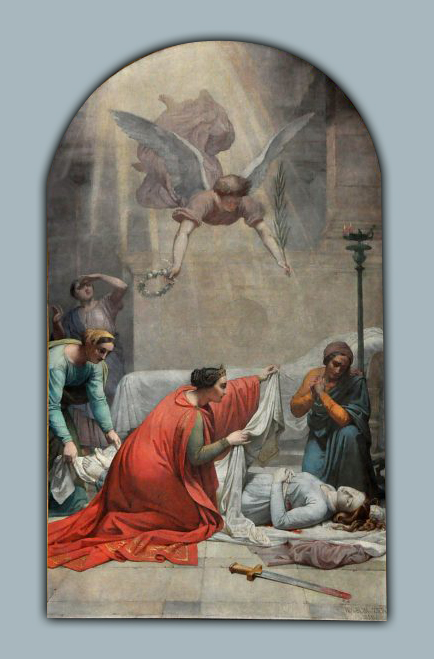
Martyrdom of St. Susanna.

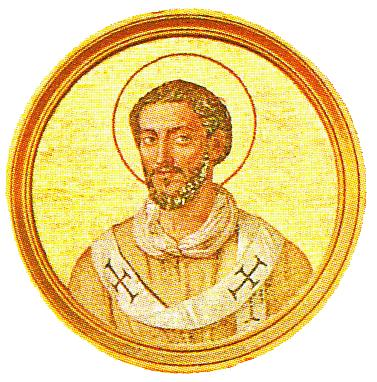
Hieromartyr Gaius, Pope of Rome.

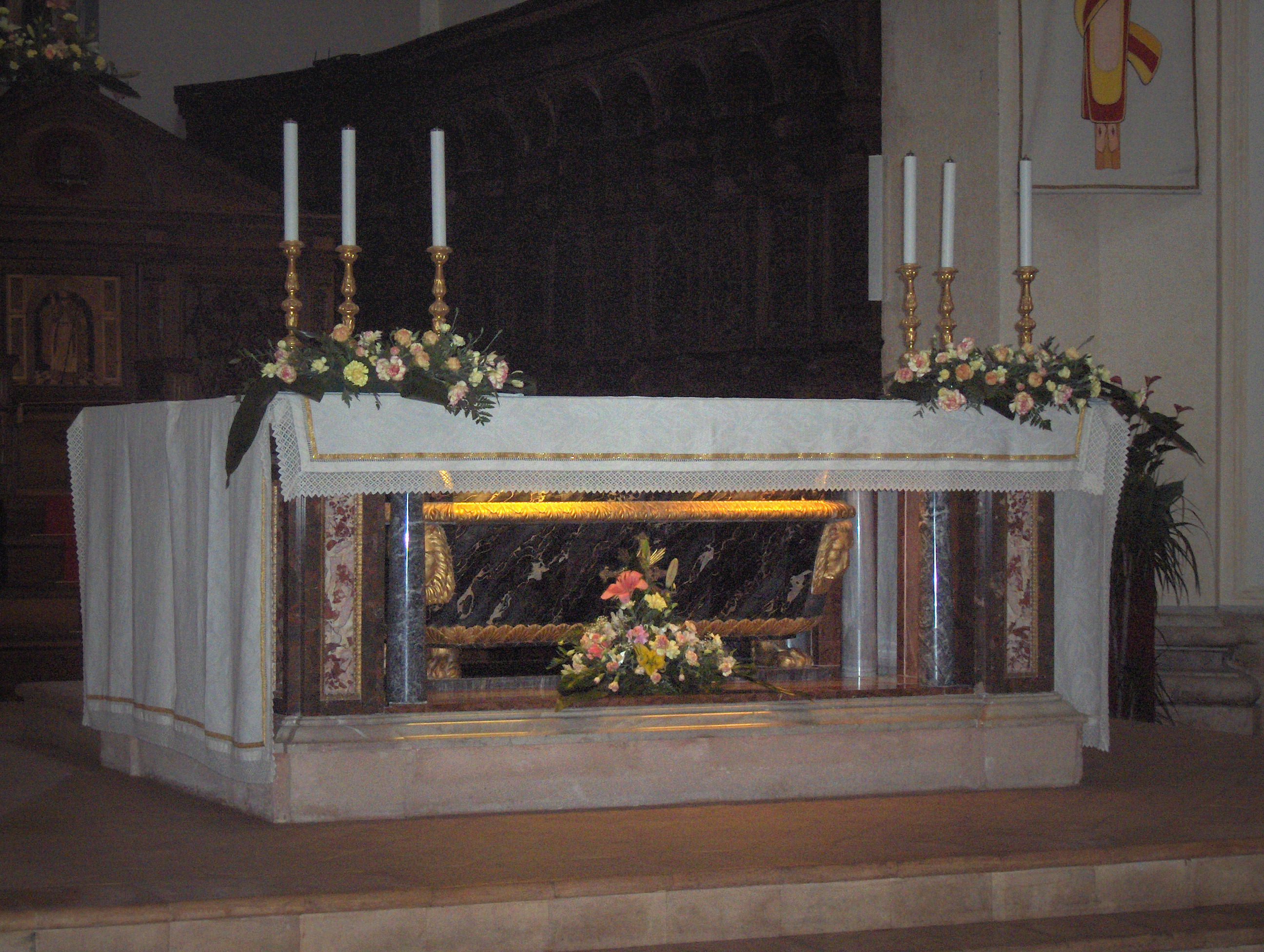
Main altar with tomb of St. Rufinus; Cathedral of San Rufino, Assisi, Italy.

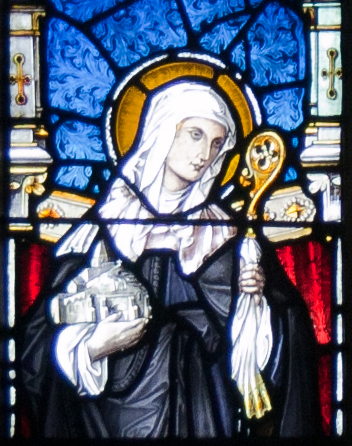
Saint Attracta (Athracht), anchoress.

Historic Scotland Signage at the entrance to St Blane's Church Sight.

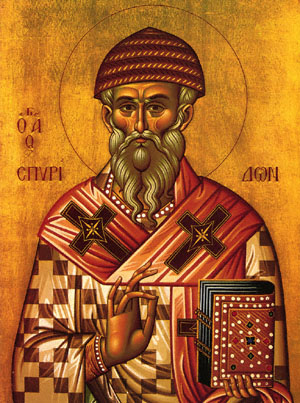
St. Spyridon.

== Sources ==
- August 11 / August 24. Orthodox Calendar (PRAVOSLAVIE.RU).
- August 24 / August 11. HOLY TRINITY RUSSIAN ORTHODOX CHURCH (A parish of the Patriarchate of Moscow).
- August 11. OCA - The Lives of the Saints.
- The Autonomous Orthodox Metropolia of Western Europe and the Americas (ROCOR). St. Hilarion Calendar of Saints for the year of our Lord 2004. St. Hilarion Press (Austin, TX). p. 59.
- Menologion: The Eleventh Day of the Month of August. Orthodoxy in China.
- August 11. Latin Saints of the Orthodox Patriarchate of Rome.
- The Roman Martyrology. Transl. by the Archbishop of Baltimore. Last Edition, According to the Copy Printed at Rome in 1914. Revised Edition, with the Imprimatur of His Eminence Cardinal Gibbons. Baltimore: John Murphy Company, 1916. pp. 239-240.
- Rev. Richard Stanton. A Menology of England and Wales, or, Brief Memorials of the Ancient British and English Saints Arranged According to the Calendar, Together with the Martyrs of the 16th and 17th Centuries. London: Burns & Oates, 1892. p. 389.

Greek Sources

- Great Synaxaristes: (in Greek) 11 ΑΥΓΟΥΣΤΟΥ. ΜΕΓΑΣ ΣΥΝΑΞΑΡΙΣΤΗΣ.
- (in Greek) Συναξαριστής. 11 Αυγούστου. ECCLESIA.GR. (H ΕΚΚΛΗΣΙΑ ΤΗΣ ΕΛΛΑΔΟΣ).

Russian Sources

- (in Russian) 24 августа (11 августа). Православная Энциклопедия под редакцией Патриарха Московского и всея Руси Кирилла (электронная версия). (Orthodox Encyclopedia - Pravenc.ru).
