= September 11 (Eastern Orthodox liturgics) =

Day in the Eastern Orthodox liturgical calendar

Eastern Orthodox liturgical calendar
September 10	September 11	September 12
September 11 O.S. ≍ September 24 N.S. September 11 N.S ≍ August 29 O.S.

An Eastern Orthodox cross

September 11 in Eastern Orthodox liturgical calendars is a feast day and a day of commemoration of saints and martyrs. Although some Orthodox churches use the Revised Julian Calendar and others use the traditional Julian calendar, the fixed commemorations for their respective September 11 are broadly the same, no matter which calendar is used. (Note: Despite the dates being the same, the days to which they refer typically differ by 13 days. The notation Old Style or O.S. is sometimes used to indicate a date in the traditional Julian Calendar (the "Old Calendar"). The notation New Style or N.S. indicates a date in the Revised Julian calendar (the "New Calendar").)

== Feasts ==
- Afterfeast of the Nativity of the Theotokos.

== Saints ==
- Martyrs Demetrius, his wife Evanthia, and their son Demetrian, at Skepsis on the Hellespont (1st century) (Note: Name days celebrated today include: Evanthia (Εὐανθία).)
- Martyrs Serapion, Cronides (Hieronides), and Leontius, of Alexandria (237) (see also: September 13)
- Martyr Ia of Persia and 9,000 martyrs of Persia under Shapur II with her (362–364) (see also: September 10, August 4, August 11)
- Martyrs Diodorus, Didymus, and Diomedes of Laodicea (362–364)
- Saint Paphnutius the Confessor, Bishop in the Egyptian Thebaid (4th century) (Note: "In Egypt, the holy bishop Paphpnutius, one of those confessors, who, under the emperor Galerius Maximinus, having their right eye plucked out and the joint of the left knee cut, were condemned to work in the metal mines. Afterwards, under Constantine the Great, he courageously combated for the Catholic faith against the Arians, and at length, being adorned with many crowns, rested in peace.") (see also: March 27)
- Venerable Theodora of Alexandria (491) (Note: "At Alexandria, St. Theodora, who having committed a fault through imprudence and repenting of it, remained unknown in a religious habit, and persevered until her death in practices of extraordinary abstinence and patience.")
- Saint Euphrosynus the Cook of Alexandria (9th century) (Note: See: (in Greek) Άγιος Ευφρόσυνος ο μάγειρας. Βικιπαίδεια. (Greek Wikipedia).)
- Venerable Elias the Cave-dweller of Calabria (Elia Speleota), and his spiritual father St. Arsenios (c. 960) (Note: Not to be confused with St. Elias of Calabria (903), August 17.) (Note: See: (in Italian) Elia Speleota. Wikipedia. (Italian Wikipedia).)
- Holy Martyr Theodora of Vasta, in the central Peloponnese (10th century) (Note: Currently the church of Saint Theodora of Vasta has 17 enormous holly and maple trees growing on its roof. Most of them are taller than 30 meters. Saint Theodora has become an important saint of the Greek Orthodox Church and the site has become important for religious pilgrims and sightseers alike.)

== Pre-Schism Western saints ==
- Saint Protus and Hyacinth, by tradition brothers, they were both servants and were martyred in Rome (c. 257) (Note: The relics of St Hyacinth were uncovered in 1845.) (Note: "AT Rome, in the Cemetery of Basilla, on the old Salarian road, the birthday of the holy martyrs Protus and Hyacinth, brothers and eunuchs in the service of blessed Eugenia, who were arrested, in the time of the emperor Gallienus, on the charge of being Christians, and urged to offer sacrifice to the gods. But as they refused, both were most severely scourged, and finally beheaded.")
- Saints Felix and Regula, brother and sister, martyred near Zurich (3rd century)
- Saint Patiens of Lyon, Archbishop of Lyon in France (c. 491) (Note: He was highly praised by his contemporary St Sidonius Apollinaris. He devoted all his income to the poor.)
- Saint Emilian, a hermit for forty years, he became Bishop of Vercelli in Piedmont in Italy, where he reposed a centenarian (520)
- Saint Vincent of León, Abbot of St Claudius in León in Spain, he was martyred by the Arian Visigoths (c. 554 (Note: See: Vicente de León)
- Saint Almirus (Almer, Almire), born in Auvergne in France, he finally went to live as a hermit at Gréez-sur-Roc, where he reposed (c. 560)
- Saint Deiniol, Abbot and first Bishop of Bangor, Wales (584) (Note: "ST. DANIEL was the first Bishop of Bangor, and is said to have been consecrated to that See by St. Dubritius in the year 516. He was so renowned for the sanctity of his life that the Cathedral of Bangor and other churches were dedicated in his honour. The day assigned to his commemoration in the Welsh Calendars is the 11th September. He passed to a better life in the year 545.")
- Saint Adelphus, grandson of St Romaricus and his successor as Abbot of Remiremont Abbey in the east of France (c. 670)
- Saint Bodo (Leudinus), Bishop of Toul (c. 670) (Note: Born in Toul in France, he was the brother of St Salaberga. He married but, by mutual consent, he and his wife entered monasteries. He became a monk in Laon but was forced to leave to become Bishop of Toul. He founded monasteries at Etival, Bon-Moutier and Affonville.)

== Post-Schism Orthodox saints ==
- Venerable Silouan the Athonite, Elder, of St. Panteleimon Monastery, Mt. Athos (1938) (see also: September 24)
- Saint John, Abbot, of Svyatogorsk Monastery (1970)

=== New martyrs and confessors ===
- Hieromartyrs Nicholas Podyakov and Victor Usov, Priests (1918)
- Hieromartyr Carp Elba, Priest (1937)
- Hieromartyr Nicholas Shirogorov, Deacon (1942)

== Other commemorations ==
- Translation of relics of Sergius and Herman, Wonder-workers of Valaam Monastery (1542–1550)
- Weeping Kazan Icon of the Most Holy Theotokos "of Kaplunovka" (1689)
- Glorification of St. Xenia of Saint Petersburg, Fool-for-Christ (1978)
- Synaxis of the Saints of the Svatogorsk Monastery.
- Repose of the young Elder Melchizedek of Mzensk (1846) (Note: See: (in Russian) Петропавловский монастырь (Мценск). Википедии. (Russian Wikipedia).) (Note: (in Russian) "Образцом святости считался иеромонах Мценского Петропавловского монастыря Мелхиседек (1818 - 1846). Соблюдав-ший строгую воздержанность в пище, он, чтобы не пропустить мо-литву, спал на кровати, отделанной зубцами наподобие рубеля. Красноречием приобрёл славу мудрого наставника. Мелхиседек пользовался покровительством родственников поэта А. Фета, Шен-шиных, владевших имением в соседней с городом д. Волково. С осо-бым расположением он относился к юродивому Михаилу Коробоч-кину, с которым иеромонах вёл душеспасительные беседы. Святость жизни Мелхиседека убеждала жителей в его особом значении перед лицом Бога, а потому, моля за ближних, они приносили ему пожерт-вования, прося распределить их между нуждающимися своей рукой. В монастыре иеромонах служил сначала казначеем, а потом настоятелем.")

== Icon gallery ==
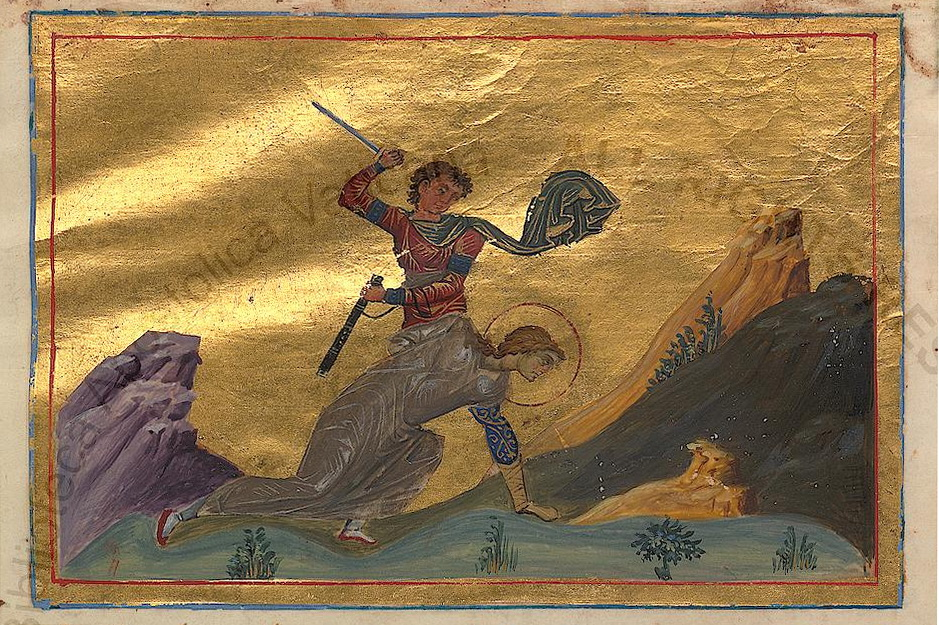
Martyr Ia of Persia.
(Menologion of Basil II, 10th century).

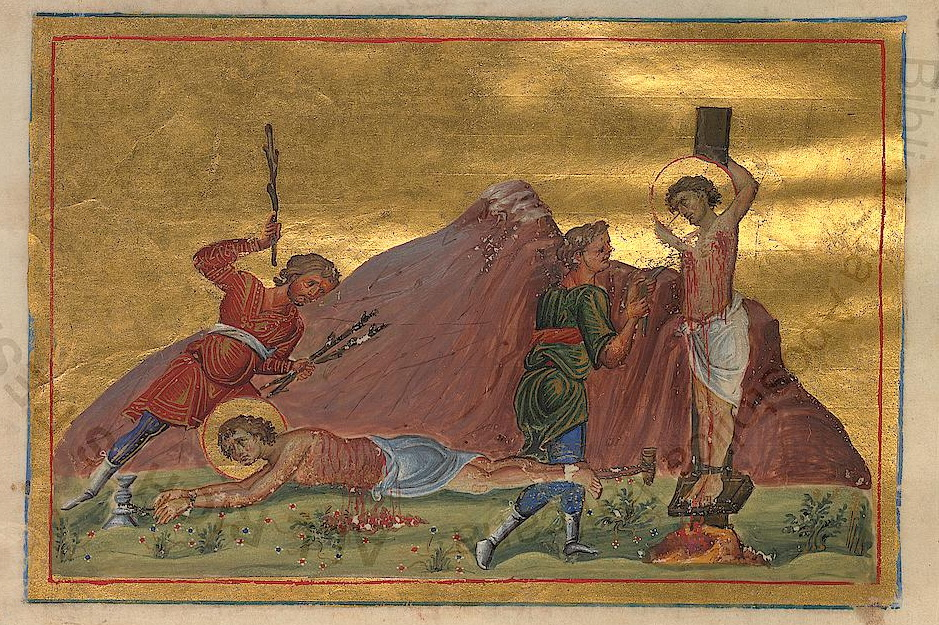
Martyrs Diodorus and Didymus of Laodicea.
(Menologion of Basil II, 10th century).

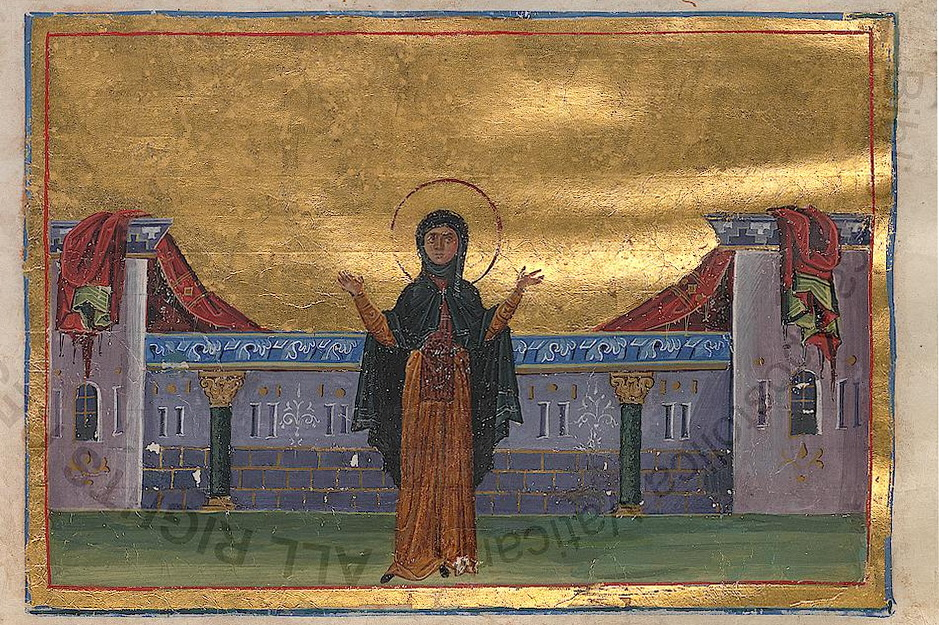
Venerable Theodora of Alexandria.
(Menologion of Basil II, 10th century).

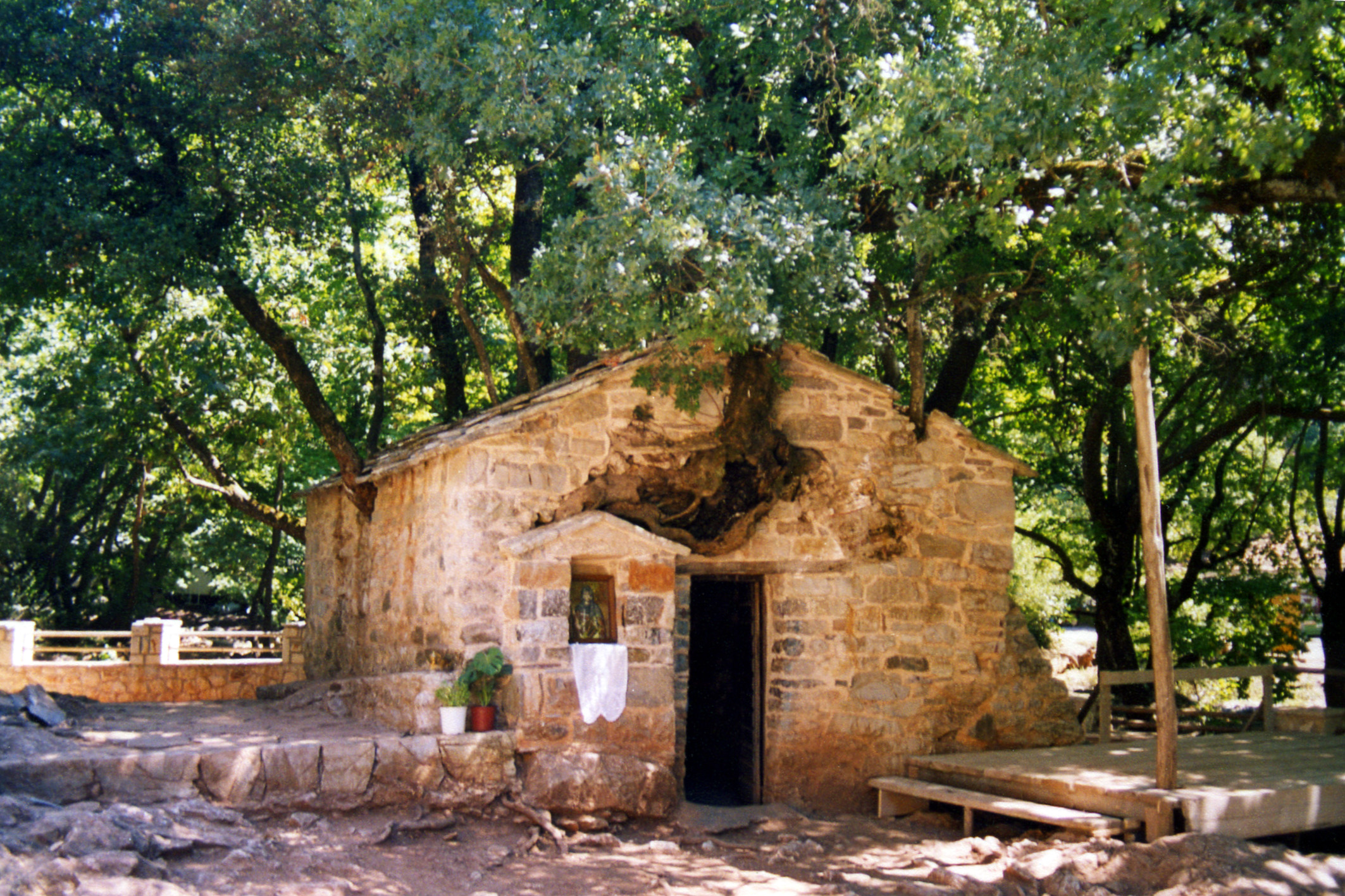
The church of St. Theodora of Vasta, with holly and maple trees growing on its roof.

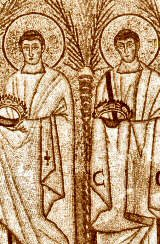
Sts. Protus and Hyacinth.

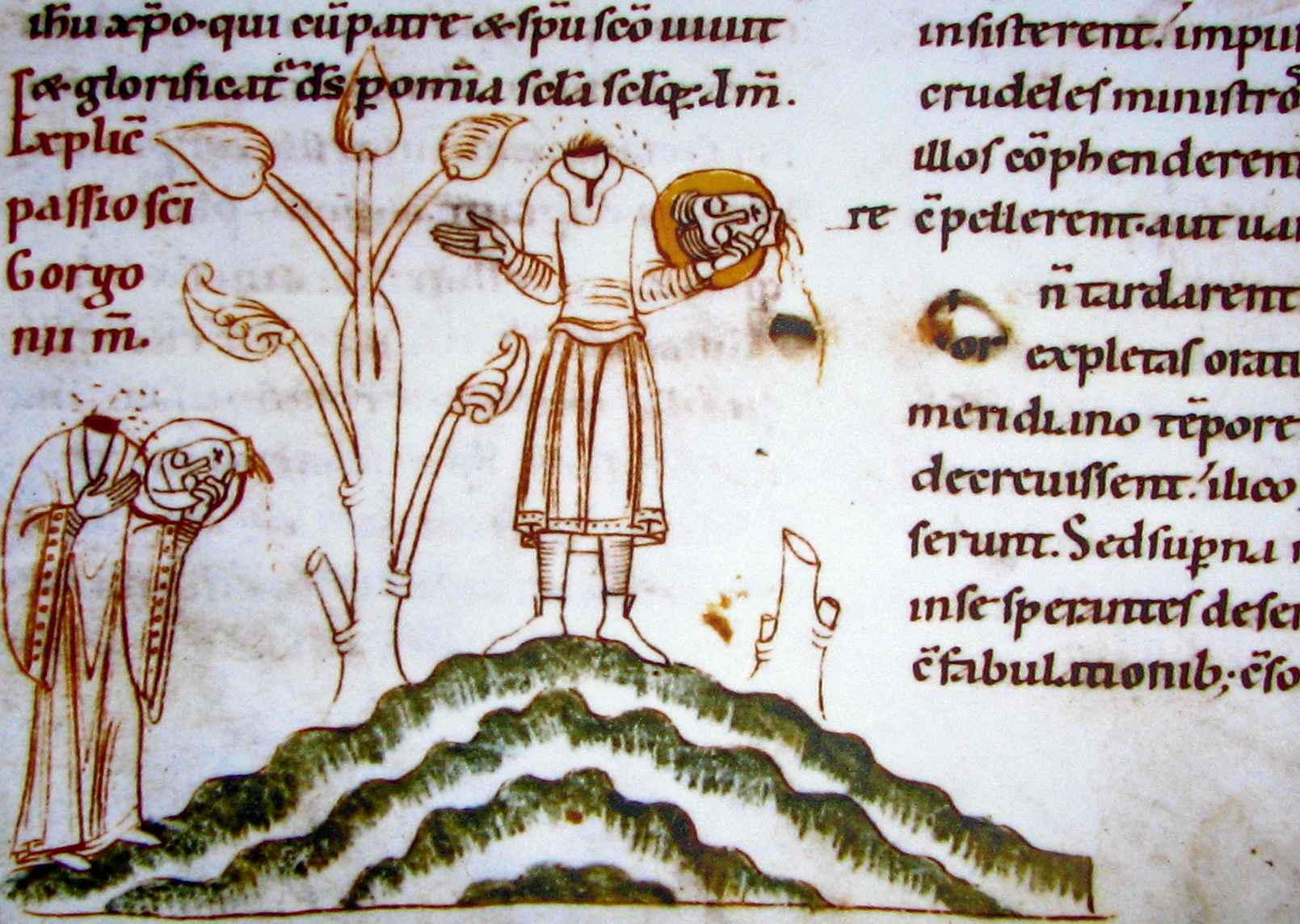
Sts. Felix and Regula.

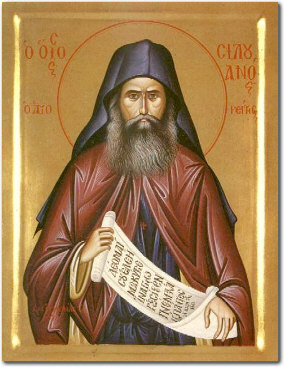
Venerable Silouan the Athonite.

== Sources ==
- September 11/September 24. Orthodox Calendar (PRAVOSLAVIE.RU).
- September 24 / September 11. HOLY TRINITY RUSSIAN ORTHODOX CHURCH (A parish of the Patriarchate of Moscow).
- September 11. OCA - The Lives of the Saints.
- The Autonomous Orthodox Metropolia of Western Europe and the Americas (ROCOR). St. Hilarion Calendar of Saints for the year of our Lord 2004. St. Hilarion Press (Austin, TX). p. 68.
- The Eleventh Day of the Month of September. Orthodoxy in China.
- September 11. Latin Saints of the Orthodox Patriarchate of Rome.
- The Roman Martyrology. Transl. by the Archbishop of Baltimore. Last Edition, According to the Copy Printed at Rome in 1914. Revised Edition, with the Imprimatur of His Eminence Cardinal Gibbons. Baltimore: John Murphy Company, 1916. pp. 279–280.
- Rev. Richard Stanton. A Menology of England and Wales, or, Brief Memorials of the Ancient British and English Saints Arranged According to the Calendar, Together with the Martyrs of the 16th and 17th Centuries. London: Burns & Oates, 1892. pp. 445–446.

Greek Sources

- Great Synaxaristes: (in Greek) 11 ΣΕΠΤΕΜΒΡΙΟΥ. ΜΕΓΑΣ ΣΥΝΑΞΑΡΙΣΤΗΣ.
- (in Greek) Συναξαριστής. 11 Σεπτεμβρίου. ECCLESIA.GR. (H ΕΚΚΛΗΣΙΑ ΤΗΣ ΕΛΛΑΔΟΣ).
- (in Greek) 11/09/2026. Ορθόδοξος Συναξαριστής.

Russian Sources

- (in Russian) 24 сентября (11 сентября). Православная Энциклопедия под редакцией Патриарха Московского и всея Руси Кирилла (электронная версия). (Orthodox Encyclopedia - Pravenc.ru).
- (in Russian) 11 сентября по старому стилю / 24 сентября по новому стилю. Русская Православная Церковь - Православный церковный календарь на 2026 год.
