= August 4 (Eastern Orthodox liturgics) =

Day in the Eastern Orthodox liturgical calendar

Eastern Orthodox liturgical calendar
August 3	August 4	August 5
August 4 O.S. ≍ August 17 N.S. August 4 N.S ≍ July 22 O.S.

An Eastern Orthodox cross

August 4 in Eastern Orthodox liturgical calendars is a feast day and a day of commemoration of saints and martyrs. Although some Orthodox churches use the Revised Julian Calendar and others use the traditional Julian calendar, the fixed commemorations for their respective August 4 are broadly the same, no matter which calendar is used. (Note: Despite the dates being the same, the days to which they refer typically differ by 13 days. The notation Old Style or O.S. is sometimes used to indicate a date in the traditional Julian Calendar (the "Old Calendar"). The notation New Style or N.S. indicates a date in the Revised Julian calendar (the "New Calendar").)

== Saints ==
- The Holy Seven Youths ("Seven Sleepers") of Ephesus:

- Maximilian, Jamblicus, Martinian, John, Dionysius, Exacustodian (Constantine), and Antoninus (250 and ca. 446)

- Martyr Eleutherius of Byzantium (early 4th century) (Note: "At Constantinople, the holy martyr Eleutherius, of the senatorial rank, who was put to the sword for Christ, in the persecution of Maximian.") (see also: December 15)
- Martyr Thathuil, by hanging from an apple tree.
- Martyr Eudokia (Ia) of Anatolia, in Persia, by beheading (362) (Note: There is some confusion in the Synaxaria between this Eudokia (Eudok-ia) and the martyr Ia.) and 9,000 with her in Persia (363) (Note: "In Persia, in the time of king Sapor, the holy martyr la and her companions, who, with nine thousand Christian captives, underwent martyrdom after having been subjected to various torments.") (see also: August 11 and September 11)

== Pre-Schism Western saints ==
- Saint Perpetua, a matron from Rome baptised by the Apostle Peter who converted her husband and her son, St Nazarius (c. 80) (Note: Her relics are enshrined in Milan and Cremona in Italy.)
- Saint Agabius, Bishop of Verona in Italy, and Confessor (c. 250)
- Saint Tertullinus, a priest, martyred in Rome under Valerian two days after his ordination (257) (Note: "At Rome, on the Latin road, the martyrdom of blessed Tertullinus, priest and martyr, in the time of emperor Valerian. After being cruelly beaten with rods, after having his sides burned, his mouth shattered; after being stretched on the rack and scourged with whips, he completed his martyrdom by being beheaded.")
- Saints Epiphanes and Isidore, two early martyrs, venerated at the Cathedral of Besançon in France until the French Revolution.
- Saint Protasius, a martyr honoured in Cologne in Germany.
- Saint Sithney (Sezni), patron saint of Sithney, Cornwall (c. 529) (Note: Born in Britain, he went to Guic-Sezni in Brittany, where he founded a monastery and where his relics were venerated. He is the patron saint of Sithney in Cornwall.)
- Saint Euphronius of Tours, Bishop of Tours in France (573)
- Saints Peregrinus, Maceratus and Viventius (6th century) (Note: By tradition they were two Christian brothers who came from Spain and died in France, seeking to rescue their enslaved sister.)
- Saint Lugid of Killaloe (Lua, Molua), a disciple of St Comgall, founded many monasteries (c. 609) (Note: Originally from Limerick in Ireland, he became a disciple of St Comgall and founded many monasteries. A great ascetic, he was of great tenderness to both man and beast.)

== Post-Schism Orthodox saints ==
- New Hieromartyr Cosmas of Aitolia, Equal-to-the-Apostles (1779) (Russian use only - see also: August 24 - Universal)

=== New martyrs and confessors ===
- New Hieromartyr Nicholas (Prozgrov) (1930)
- New Hieromartyr Michael (Zhuk), Hieromonk of Staroye Zubarevo in Mordovia, and Martyrs Simeon and Demetrius Vorobiev of Tver (1937)

== Other commemorations ==
- Consecration of the sacred temple of the Christ the Saviour, within the Pantocrator Monastery in Constantinople.
- "Kazan-Penza" (Kazan of Penza) Icon of the Most Holy Theotokos (1717) (see also: July 8)
- Uncovering of the relics (2000) of Saint Alexei Bortsurmansky (1848) (Note: This was entered into the menologion with the blessing of His Holiness Patriarch Kirill I of Moscow, on November 28, 2011. See also: (in Russian): Алексий Бортсурманский (Russian Wikipedia).) (see also: April 21)

== Icon gallery ==
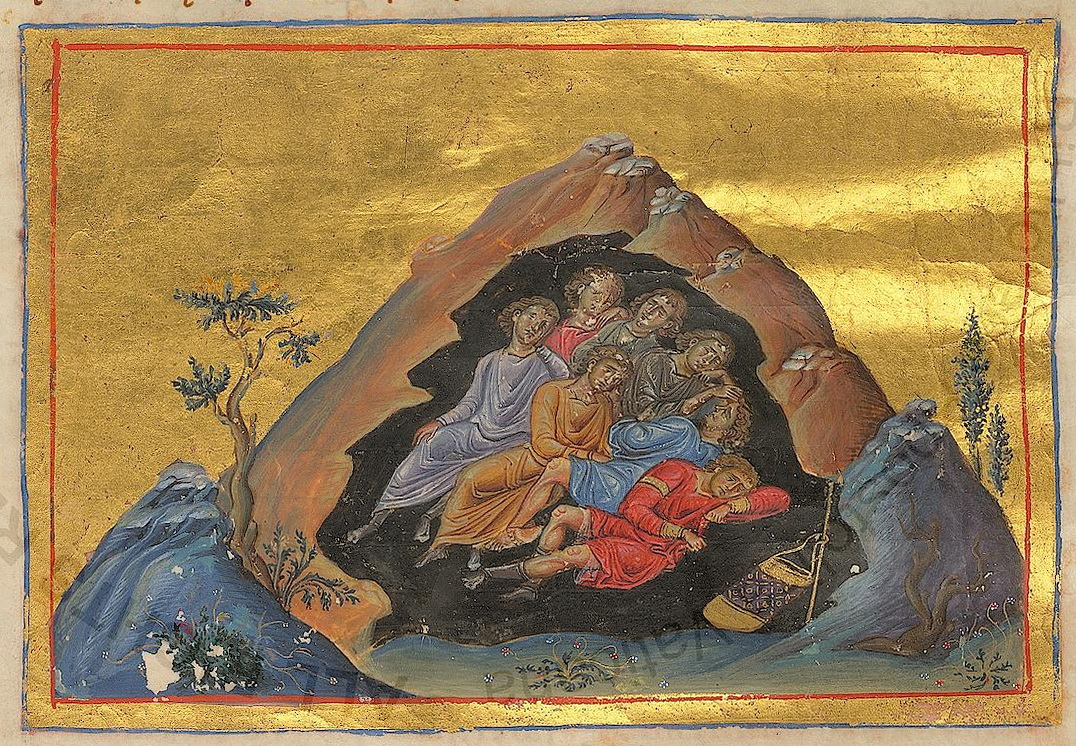
The Holy Seven Youths ("Seven Sleepers") of Ephesus.
(Menologion of Basil II, 10th century).

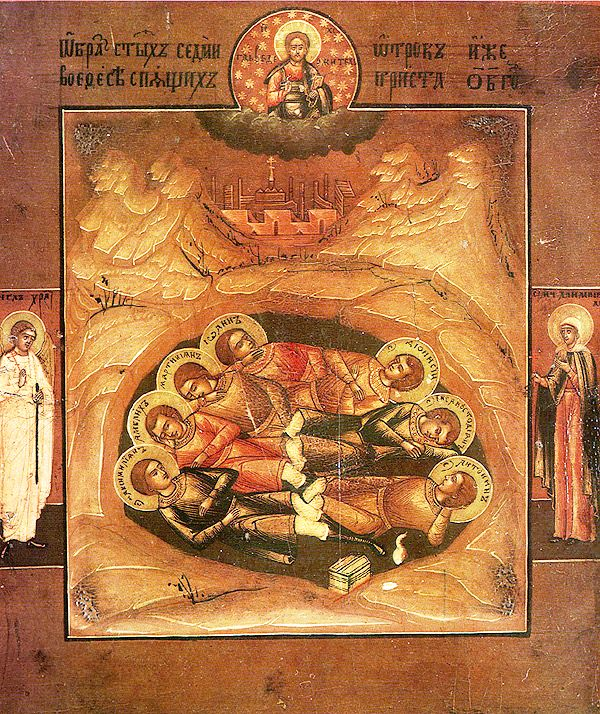
The Holy Seven Youths ("Seven Sleepers:) of Ephesus.

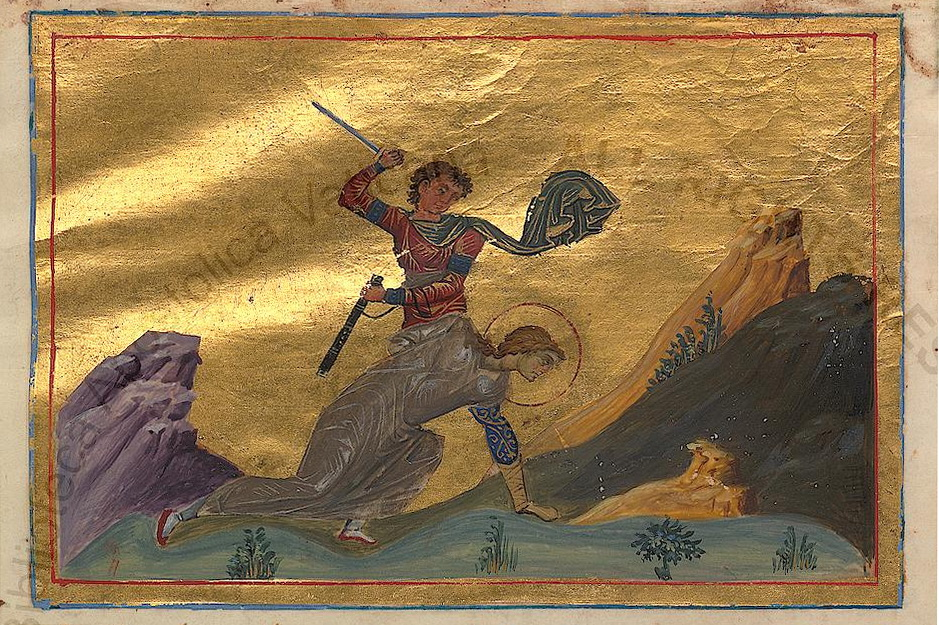
Martyr Eudoxia (Ia) of Persia (Menologion of Basil II).

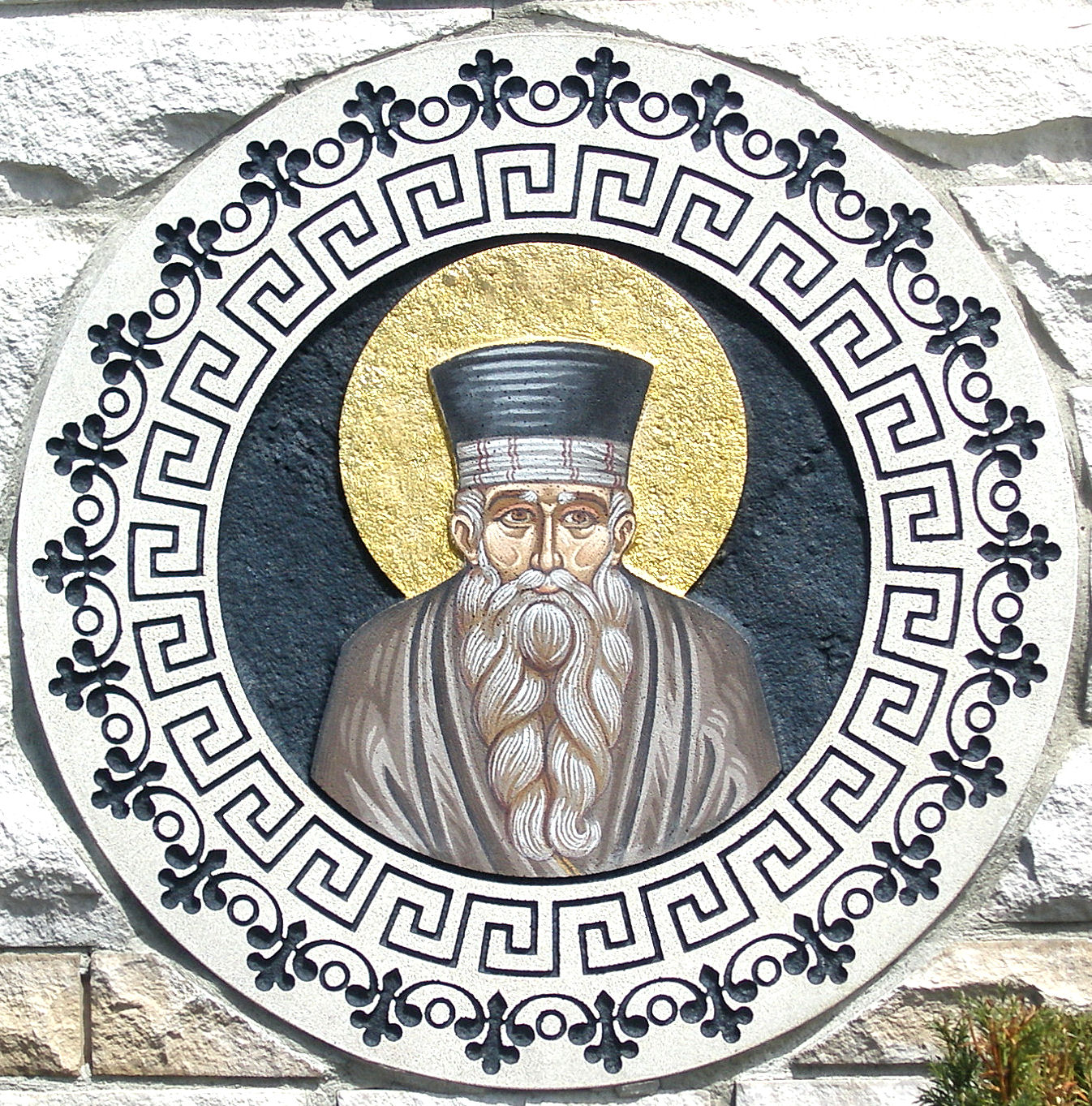
Saint Kosmas Aitolos, New Hieromartyr and Equal-to-the-Apostles.

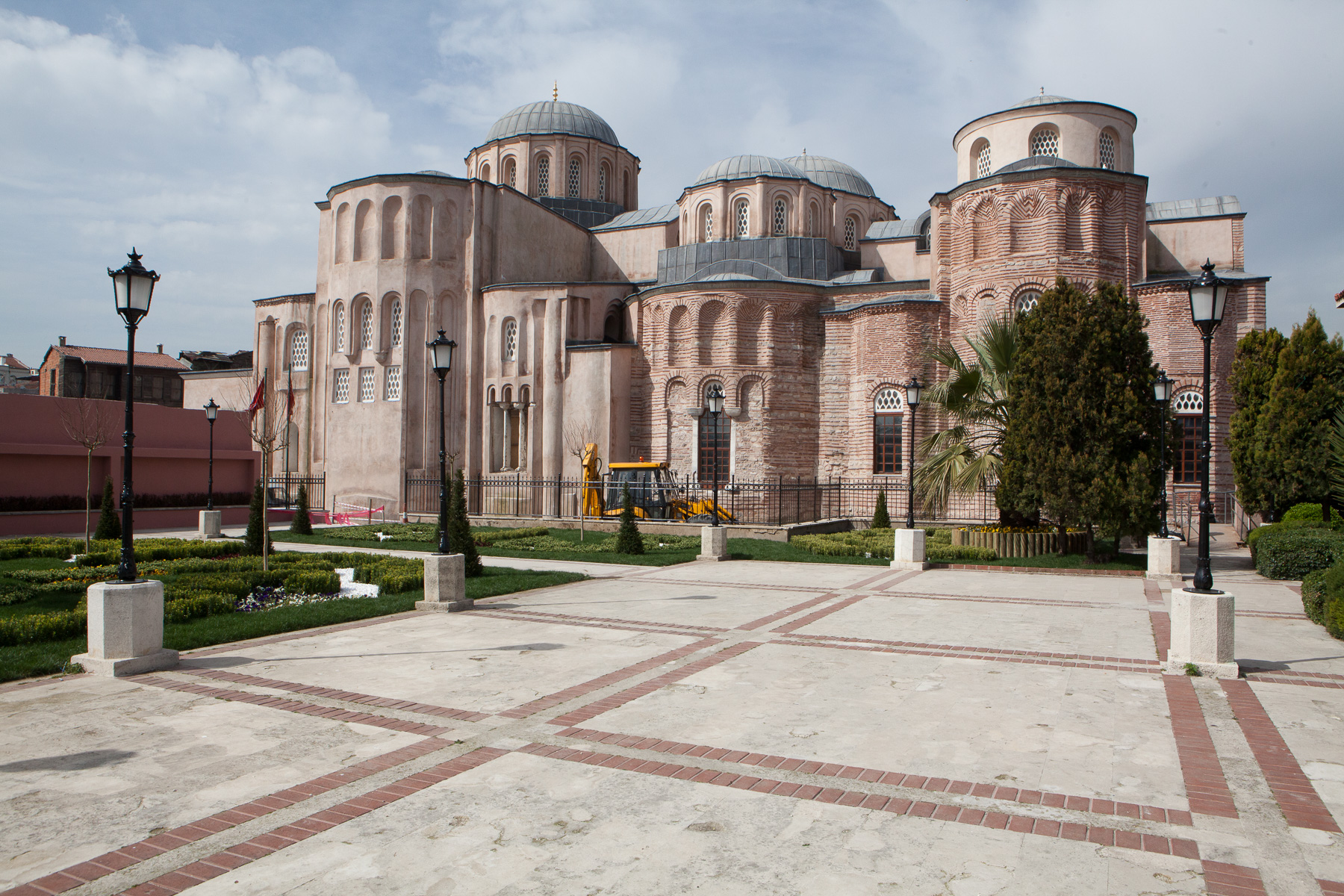
The former Church of the Pantokrator (today Zeyrek Mosque).

== Sources ==
- August 4 / August 17. Orthodox Calendar (PRAVOSLAVIE.RU).
- August 17 / August 4. HOLY TRINITY RUSSIAN ORTHODOX CHURCH (A parish of the Patriarchate of Moscow).
- August 4. OCA - The Lives of the Saints.
- The Autonomous Orthodox Metropolia of Western Europe and the Americas (ROCOR). St. Hilarion Calendar of Saints for the year of our Lord 2004. St. Hilarion Press (Austin, TX). p. 57.
- Menologion: The Fourth Day of the Month of August. Orthodoxy in China.
- August 4. Latin Saints of the Orthodox Patriarchate of Rome.
- The Roman Martyrology. Transl. by the Archbishop of Baltimore. Last Edition, According to the Copy Printed at Rome in 1914. Revised Edition, with the Imprimatur of His Eminence Cardinal Gibbons. Baltimore: John Murphy Company, 1916. pp. 231-232.
- Rev. Richard Stanton. A Menology of England and Wales, or, Brief Memorials of the Ancient British and English Saints Arranged According to the Calendar, Together with the Martyrs of the 16th and 17th Centuries. London: Burns & Oates, 1892. pp. 379-380.

Greek Sources

- Great Synaxaristes: (in Greek) 4 ΑΥΓΟΥΣΤΟΥ. ΜΕΓΑΣ ΣΥΝΑΞΑΡΙΣΤΗΣ.
- (in Greek) Συναξαριστής. 4 Αυγούστου. ECCLESIA.GR. (H ΕΚΚΛΗΣΙΑ ΤΗΣ ΕΛΛΑΔΟΣ).

Russian Sources

- (in Russian) 17 августа (4 августа). Православная Энциклопедия под редакцией Патриарха Московского и всея Руси Кирилла (электронная версия). (Orthodox Encyclopedia - Pravenc.ru).
