= Saint-Germer-de-Fly Abbey =

Former Benedictine abbey in Oise, France

Saint-Germer-de-Fly Abbey Abbaye Saint-Germer-de-Fly
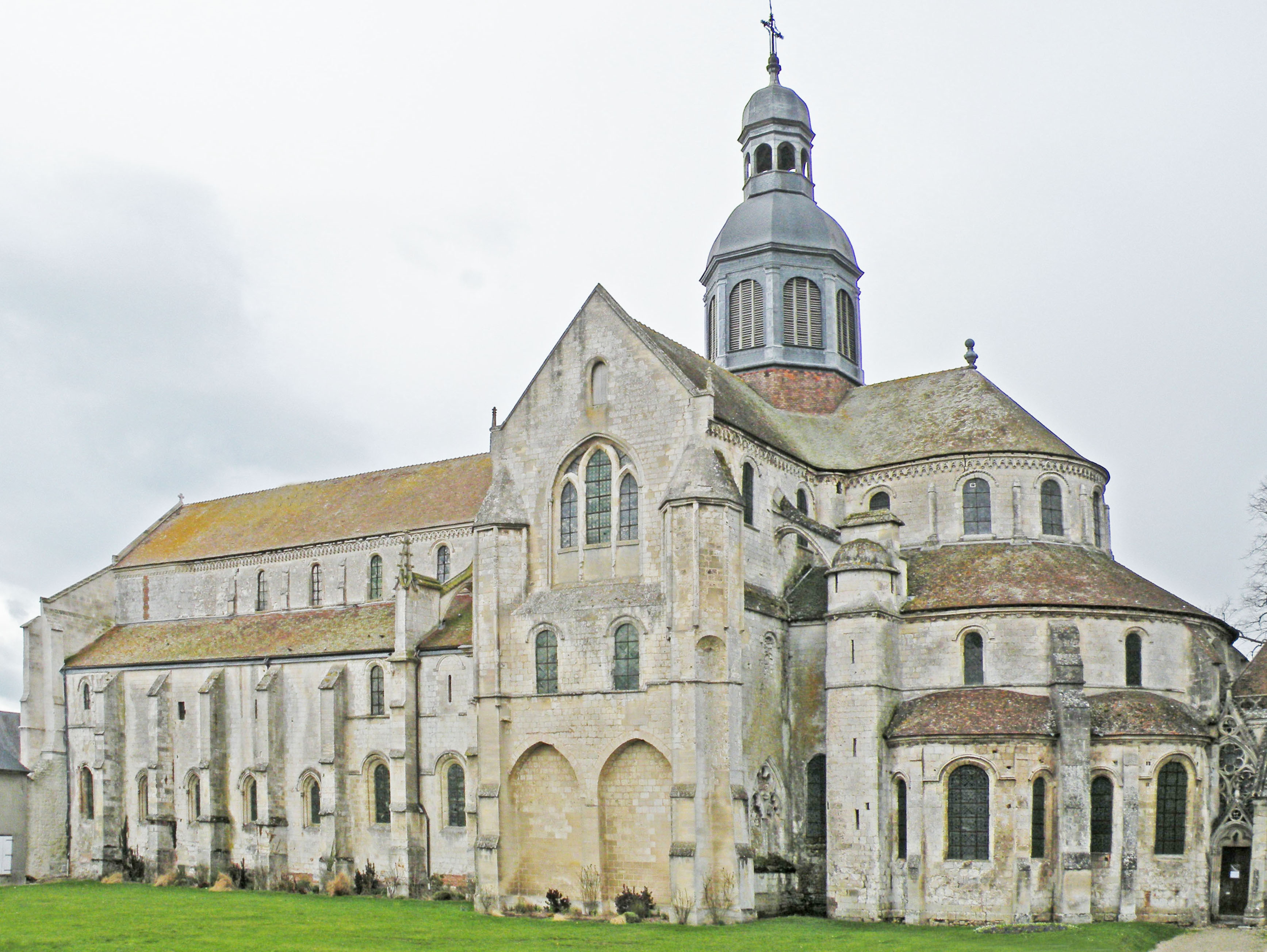
- Abbaye Saint-Germer-de-Fly

Religion
- Affiliation: Roman Catholic Church
- Region: Oise
- Rite: Roman
- Ecclesiastical or organisational status: Church
- Status: Active

Location
- Location: Saint-Germer-de-Fly, France
- Interactive map of Saint-Germer-de-Fly Abbey; Abbaye Saint-Germer-de-Fly
- Coordinates: 49°26′36″N 1°46′51″E

Architecture
- Type: church
- Style: Gothic, Romanesque
- Groundbreaking: 1135; 891 years ago
- Completed: 1259; 767 years ago
- Monument historique
- Official name: Abbaye Saint-Germer-de-Fly
- Type: Classé
- Designated: 1840
- Reference no.: PA00114860

Saint-Germer-de-Fly Abbey is a former Benedictine abbey located in the village of Saint-Germer-de-Fly, in Picardy in the Oise département of France. Only the late Romanesque-early Gothic church remains, now the village parish church. It is regarded as one of the earliest manifestations of the Gothic style in France. A Gothic chapel added in the mid-13th century is noted as a smaller-scale reinterpretation of the Sainte-Chapelle of Paris.

== History ==
The abbey was originally built in 630 by Saint Germer, its founder and first abbot, as a Benedictine abbey. He had received the religious habit from Saint Ouen, metropolitan bishop of Rouen, upon the death of his wife Domane, and it was Saint Ouen who is said to have indicated the territory of Fly to him for the establishment of a monastery.

Rebuilt once after a Viking raid in 658 and destroyed twice during Norman invasions during the 9th and 10th centuries, it was re-founded as a Cistercian abbey by the Bishop of Beauvaisand rebuilt in 1036. In 1130, the abbey constructed a Romanesque basilica church that permitted an unusual amount of light into the interior of the church. The visual lightness of the construction at Saint-Germer-de-Fly was unprecedented and presaged the later Gothic style, with its emphasis on light and lightness. Towards the end of the 11th century, the abbey would become the home of Guibert of Nogent, who joined the monastic community there at about the age of twelve, and lived within its walls for thirty years before being elected as abbot of Nogent-sous-Coucy. The relics of Saint Germer were also moved from Beauvais Cathedral to the abbey in 1132.

About 1260, Pierre de Wessencourt built the Marian Chapel at the chevet of the abbey church, which closely resembled Sainte-Chapelle in Paris, built only a few years earlier. Connected to the main church by a narrow passageway, the chapel is composed of three vaults with stained glass window-walls. While smaller than the Sainte-Chapelle, and without its original painted interior, the stonework is more decorated and detailed than the Sainte-Chapelle. It was used as a funerary chapel.

The abbey suffered greatly during the Hundred Years' War, losing its western front and six vaults. In 1414 the troops of the Duke of Burgundy destroyed the towers and one bay of the nave. The present west front was rebuilt in the 16th century.

In 1644 the abbey was transferred to the reformed Benedictine Congregation of St. Maur, who continued the rebuilding.

Like all other monasteries of France, Saint-Germer-de-Fly was confiscated as State property during the French Revolution and the abbey buildings were destroyed. After the Revolution, the surviving church became the town's parish church. The northern transept, weakened by the removal of tributary structures, was rebuilt in 1808.

== Description ==
The abbey forms a Latin cross, terminating at the head in a semicircle. The façade is quite plain, in contrast with the rest of the church. The Sainte-Chapelle is a delicate work of Rayonnant Gothic architecture.

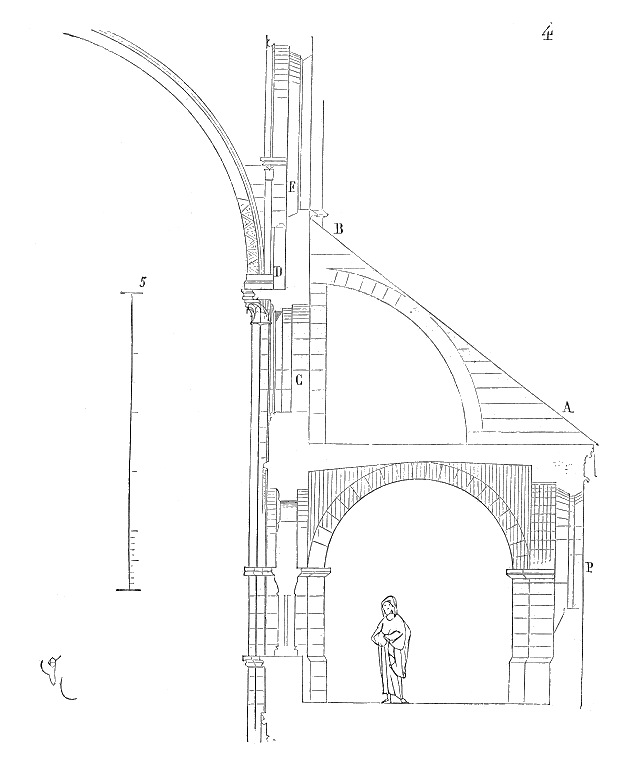
Triforium of Saint-Germer, drawn by Viollet-le-Duc

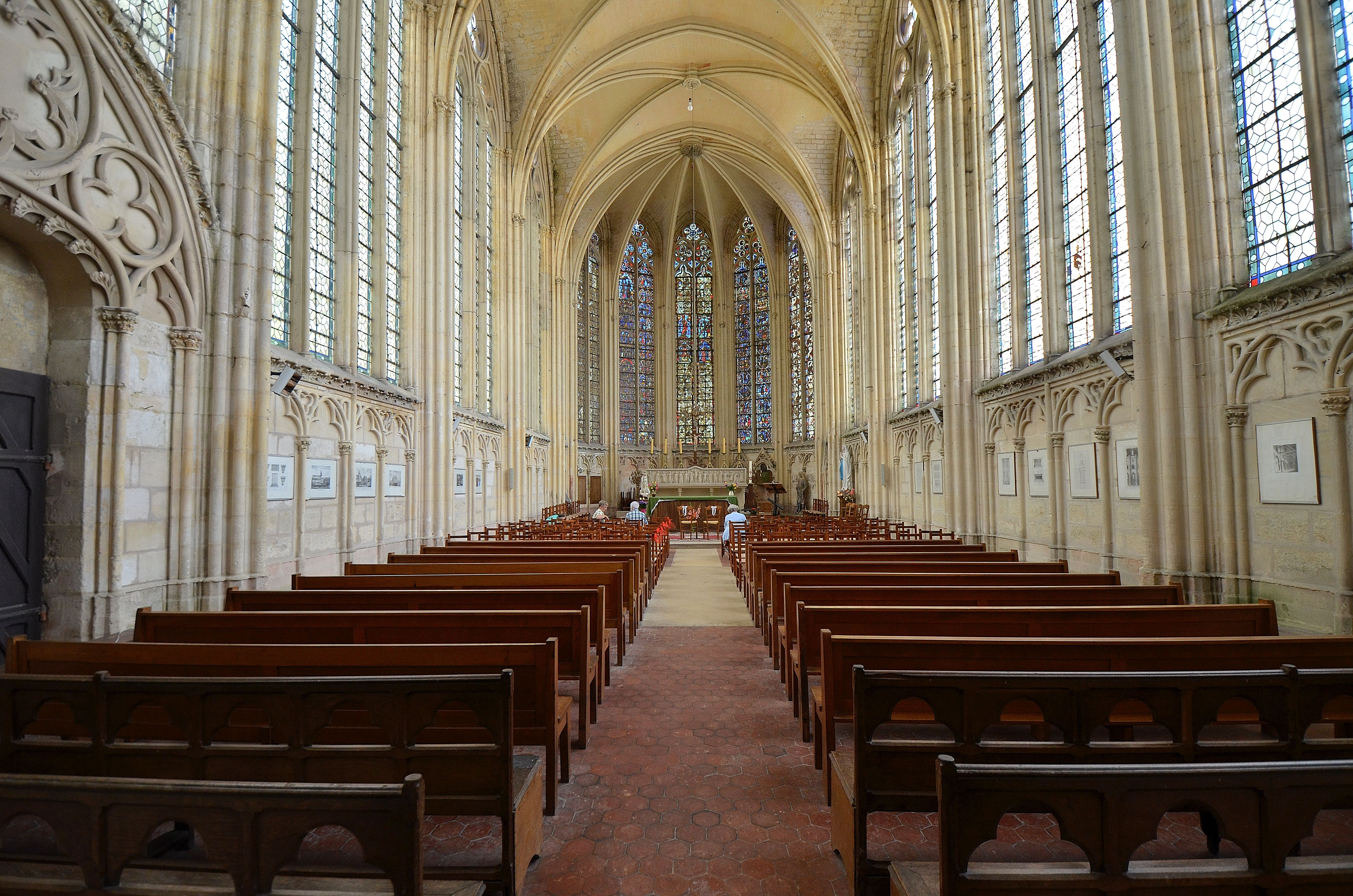
Sainte-Chapelle

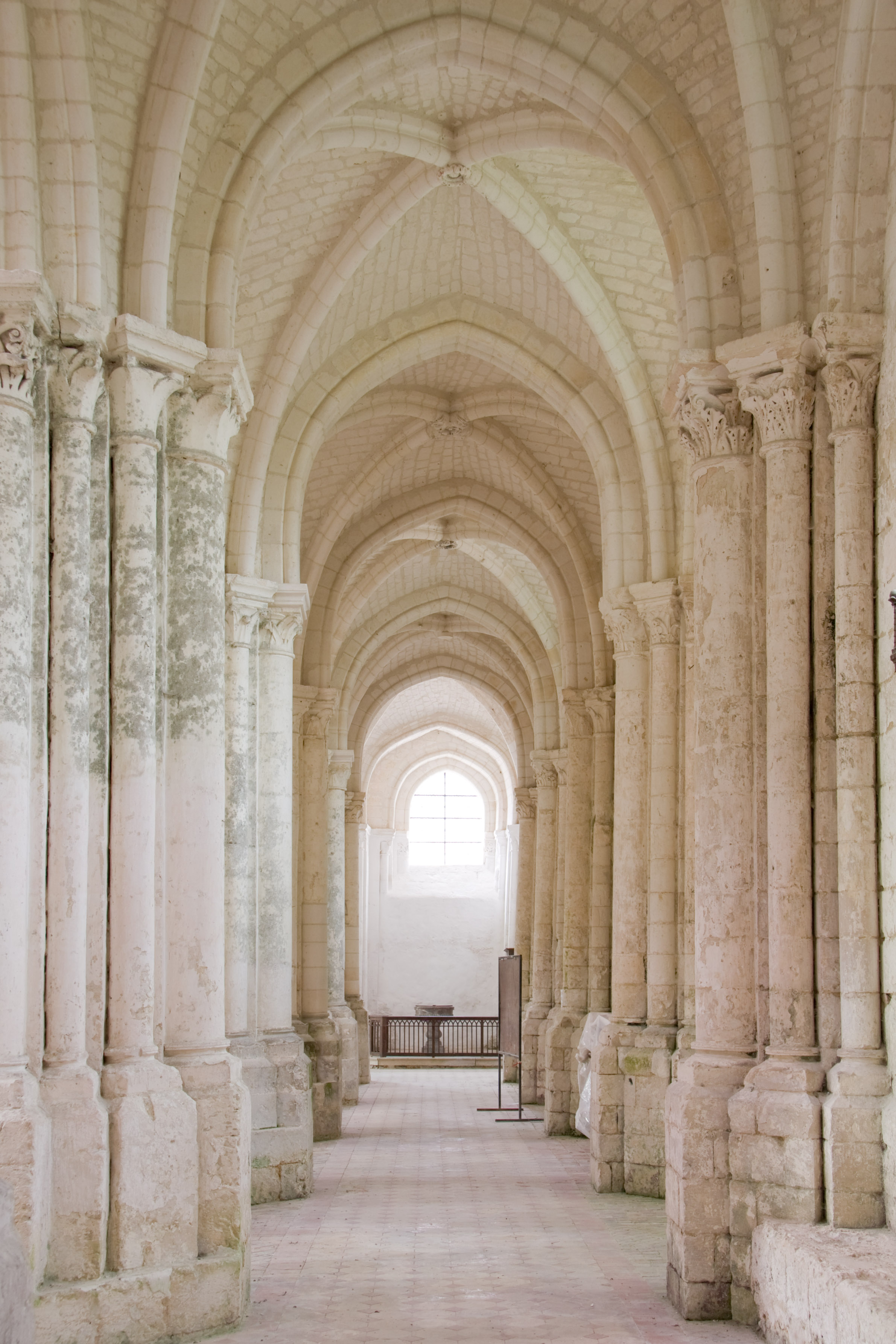
North aisle looking west
