= Eudokia of Heliopolis =

Samarian martyr (died 107)

Saint Eudokia of Heliopolis
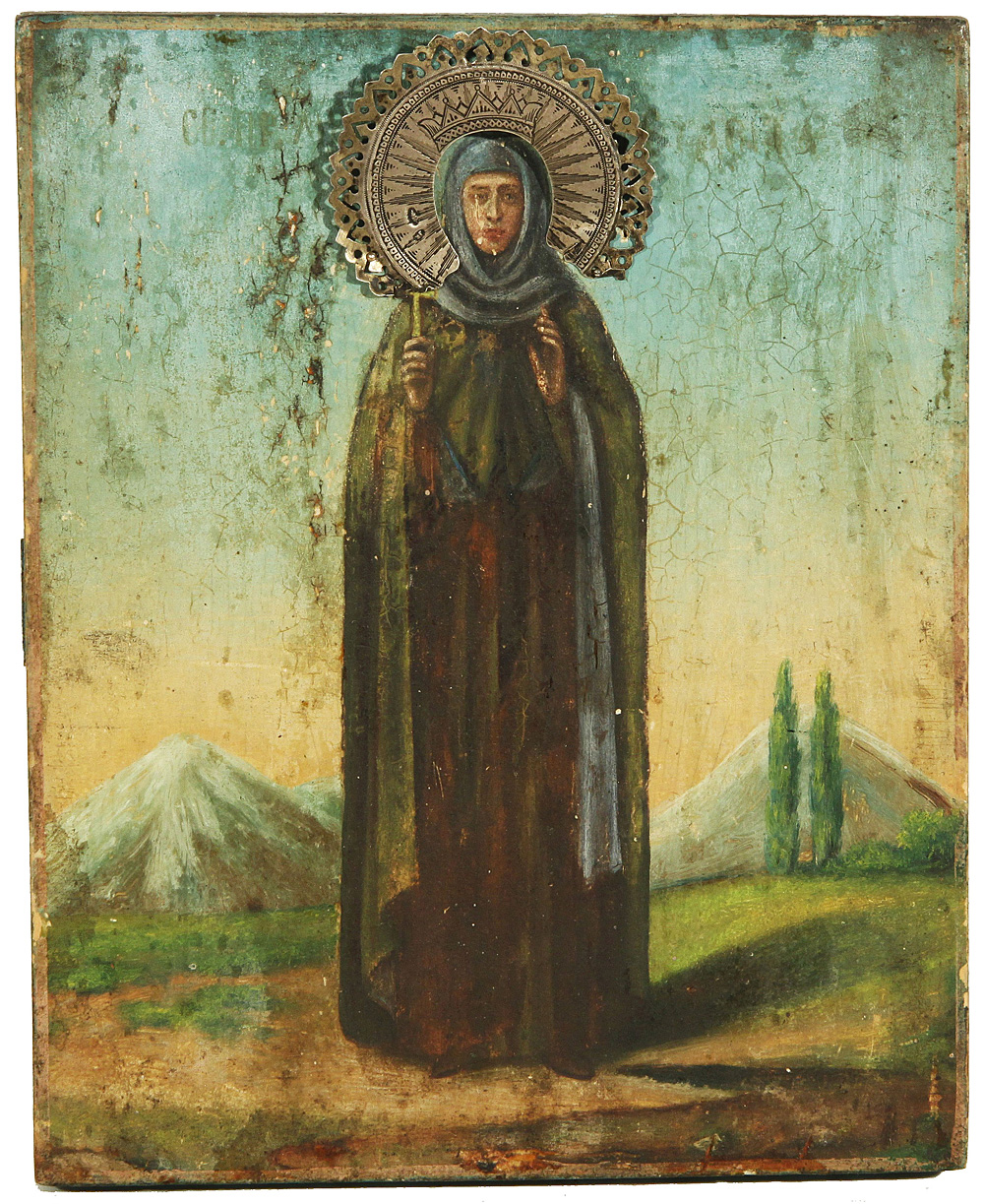

Martyr
- Died: 107
- Venerated in: Eastern Orthodoxy; Roman Catholic Church; Oriental Orthodoxy
- Feast: 1 March

Eudokia of Heliopolis (Greek: Εὐδοκία) was a Samarian woman who lived in Heliopolis of Phoenicia (present day Baalbek, Lebanon).

She should not be confused with the martyr Eudokia.

== Life ==
Eudokia was very beautiful, and garnered her wealth by attracting wealthy lovers. She learned about Christianity from a monk by the name of Germanus. According to legend, Eudokia asked him if she, too, could be saved from Judgment. Germanos instructed her to remain alone in her chamber for one week, fasting and praying. Eudokia followed his instructions, and at the end of the week, Germanus told her to give away her wealth and to put her previous life behind her. She was later baptized by Bishop Theodotus of Heliopolis.

At age 30, Eudokia entered a monastery near Heliopolis, and dispensed much of her wealth in various charitable projects. She rejected all of her suitors, and when one persistent suitor named Philostratos was struck down because of his persistence, Eudokia prayed for him until he recovered. Philostratos then converted to Christianity.

Roman officials were angered by her actions, and had her beheaded on 1 March 107 AD.

== Names ==
She is venerated by the Eastern Orthodox as Holy Monastic Martyress Eudocia, "Venerable Martyr Eudocia", Martyr Eudokia of Heliopolis, Righteous Martyr Mudocia the Samaritan, Our Holy Mother, the Martyr Eudocia, or combinations between them. The Roman Catholic commonly refer to her as Saint Eudokia of Heliopolis.

== Other spellings ==
- Modern Greek: Ευδοκία (Evdokia)
- Latin: Eudocia
- Coptic variant: Eudexia/Eutychia
- Russian/East Slavic: Евдокия/Євдокія (Yevdokiya)

== Romanian folklore ==
In Romanian folklore, the figure of Baba Dochia is thought to have taken her name from Eudokia.

== Sources ==
- Antiochian Orthodox Christian Diocese of North America
- Greek Orthodox Archdiocese of Australia
