= Dorothy of Kashin =

Eastern Orthodox Saint

The Venerable Dorothy of Kashin
- Born: 1549
- Died: 1629
- Honored in: Eastern Orthodox Church
- Feast: September 24 (Orthodox)

The Venerable Dorothy of Kashin (1549 – 1629), sometimes known as Dorothea of Kashin, was a Russian nun. She is recognised by the Eastern Orthodox Church and commemorated on September 24th of the Eastern Orthodox liturgical calendar.

== Historiography ==
Dorothy of Kashin was born in 1549 to a noble family, but her place of birth is unknown. She married Theodore Ladygin and they had a son named Michael. Her husband died defending Kashin (Russian: Ка́шин) against Polish and Lithuanian invaders.

After the death of her husband, Dorothy took refuge in the Convent of the Meeting of the Lord in Kashin, which had held the holy relics of Anna of Kashin, but had been sacked and destroyed along with the town. She made a cell in the midst of the ruins and distributed her possessions to the poor. In 1615, she received the Great Schema (the highest degree of Eastern Orthodox monasticism).

Dorothy died in 1629 and was buried on the north side of the monastery church. She is commemorated on September 24th of the Eastern Orthodox liturgical calendar.
