= Equitius =

Saint Equitius
- Born: ~490 AD; Abruzzi region, Italy
- Died: ~570 AD
- Venerated in: Roman Catholic Church
- Major shrine: Santa Margherita all'Aquila, L'Aquila.
- Feast: August 11
- Attributes: holds the model of a monastery
- Patronage: L'Aquila

Saint Equitius (Italian: Sant'Equizio) was an abbot of the 6th century. He was born between 480 and 490 in the region of Valeria Suburbicaria (present-day L'Aquila-Rieti-Tivoli).

== Attestations ==
Gregory the Great refers to Equitius in his Dialogues (I,4 in PL, LXXVII, coll. 165–77), and states that Equitius was a follower of Saint Benedict of Nursia. Equitius worked to spread monasticism in Italy and the West but was never ordained as a priest. However, Gregory writes that Equitius’ reputation for sanctity was such that the saint was able to recruit many new monks in the region of Valeria, many of whom later acquired high office within the Church.

The pope initiated an investigation into Equitius when complaints were made regarding the saint's standing. The pope sent a priest named Julian to investigate Equitius, but the pope ended the investigation after receiving a vision concerning Equitius.

Equitius died at his monastery of San Lorenzo di Pizzoli. His monks were absorbed into the Benedictine Order.
