= Martyrs of Sigum =

Saints Nemesianus, Felix, another Felix, Lucius, Litteus, Polyanus, Victor, Jader, Dativus and Others
- Died: c. 257; Sigum, Numidia
- Feast: 10 September

The Martyrs of Sigum were a group of Nicomedians who were arrested and worked to death around 257 in the marble quarries of Sigum, Numidia, during the persecution of the Christians initiated by the Roman emperor Valerian (r. 253–260). They were recognized as saints, with a feast day of 10 September.

== Ramsgate account ==
The monks of Ramsgate wrote in 1921,

Nemesianus, Felix, another Felix, Lucius, Litteus, Polyanus, Victor, Jader, Dativus and Others (SS.) (Sept. 10)

(3rd century) African Bishops, seized in the persecution under Valerian, scourged and otherwise tortured, finally condemned to servitude in the mines (A.D. 260). In the works of Saint Cyprian will be found a magnificent and consoling Epistle addressed by that Holy Martyr–Bishop to these his suffering brethren.

== Butler's account ==
The hagiographer Alban Butler names the martyrs as Nemesianus, Felix, Lucius, another Felix, Litteus, Polianus, Victor, Jader, and Dativus, and Others. He wrote,

In the first year of the eighth general persecution, raised by Valerian, Saint Cyprian was banished by the proconsul of Carthage to Curubis. At the same time the president of Numidia, proceeded with more severity against the Christians, tortured many, and afterwards put several to barbarous deaths, and sent others to work in the mines, or rather in quarries of marble; for Pliny tells us there were no other in Numidia. Out of this holy company some were frequently called to be tormented afresh, or inhumanly butchered, whilst others continued their lingering martyrdom in hunger, nakedness, and filth, exhausted with hard labour, and tormented with daily stripes, and perpetual reproaches and insults. Saint Cyprian wrote from the place of his banishment to comfort and encourage these gallant sufferers for their faith.

Butler goes on to quote the lengthy letter from Saint Cyprian, in which he praises them for their courage and encourages them to look forward to their reward in heaven.

== Sources ==
- Butler, Alban (1866), The Lives of the Fathers, Martyrs, and Other Principal Saints, James Duffy
- "Martyrs of Sigum", CatholicSaints.info
- St. Augustine's Abbey, Ramsgate (1921), The Book of saints : a dictionary of servants of God canonized by the Catholic Church, London: A. & C. Black, ltd.
