= Novaya Mikhaylovka =

Novaya Mikhaylovka Новая Михайловка
- Village
- Location within Bashkortostan Location within Russia
- Coordinates: 55°10′N 58°05′E
- Country: Russia
- Region: Bashkortostan
- District: Salavatsky District
- Time zone: UTC+5:00

Novaya Mikhaylovka (Russian: Новая Михайловка) is a rural locality (a village) in Maloyazovsky Selsoviet, Salavatsky District, Bashkortostan, Russia. The population was 7 as of 2010. There is 1 street.

== Geography ==
Novaya Mikhaylovka is located 5 km west of Maloyaz (the district's administrative centre) by road. Maloyaz is the nearest rural locality.
