= Saint-Germer-de-Fly =

Commune in Hauts-de-France, France

- Commune
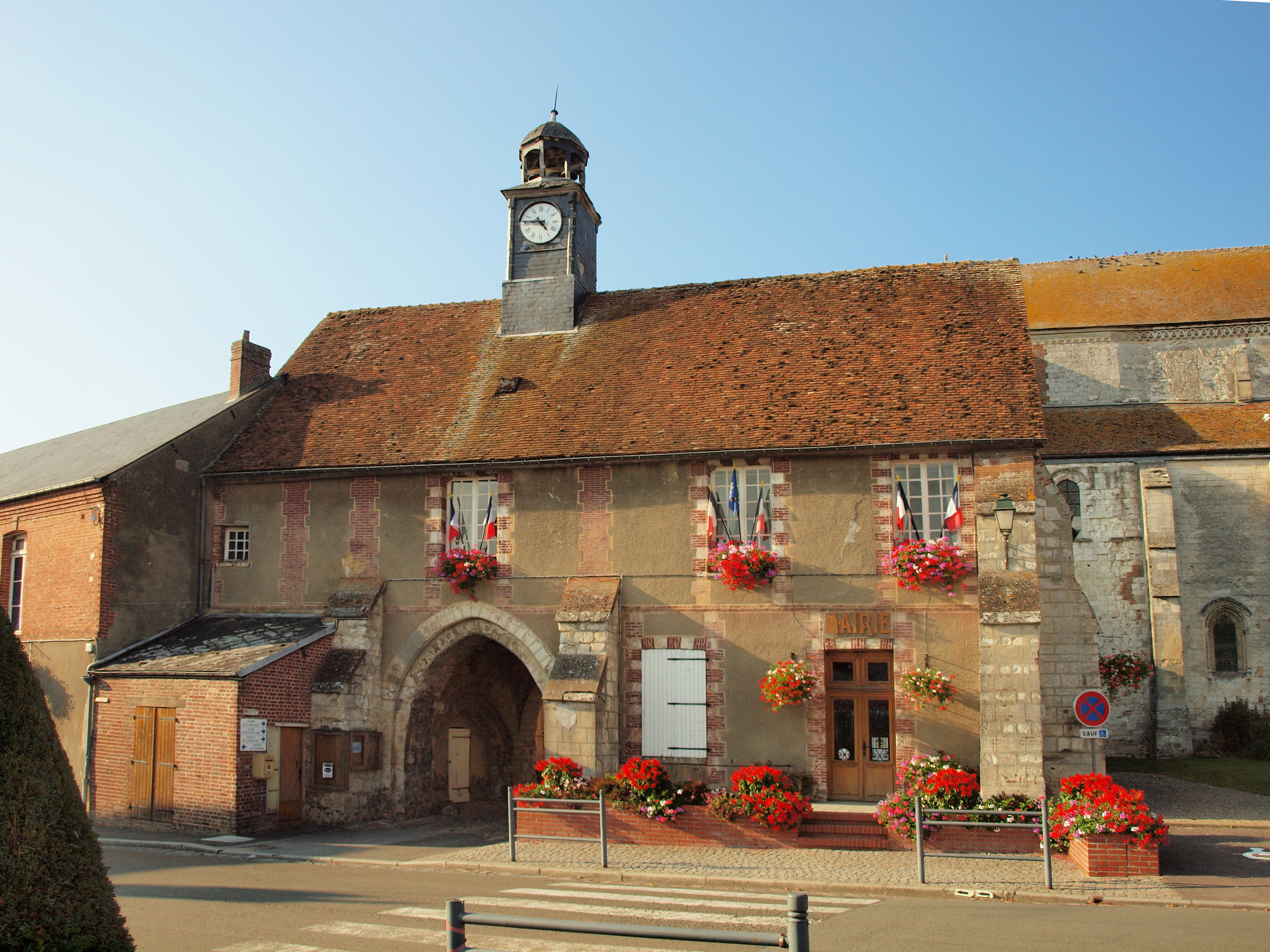
- The town hall in Saint-Germer-de-Fly
- Location of Saint-Germer-de-Fly
- Location within France Location within Hauts-de-France
- Coordinates: 49°26′38″N 1°46′57″E
- Country: France
- Region: Hauts-de-France
- Department: Oise
- Arrondissement: Beauvais
- Canton: Grandvilliers
- Intercommunality: Pays de Bray

Government
  - Mayor (2020–2026): Alain Levasseur
- Area^{1}: 19.9 km^{2} (7.7 sq mi)
- Elevation: 151 m (495 ft)
- Highest elevation: 220 m (720 ft)
- Lowest elevation: 84 m (276 ft)
- Population (2023): 1,662
  - Density: 83.5/km^{2} (216/sq mi)
- Time zone: UTC+01:00 (CET)
  - Summer (DST): UTC+02:00 (CEST)
- INSEE/Postal code: 60577 /60850
- ^{1} French Land Register data, which excludes lakes, ponds, glaciers > 1 km^{2} (0.386 sq mi or 247 acres) and river estuaries.

Saint-Germer-de-Fly (French pronunciation: [sɛ̃ ʒɛʁmɛʁ də fli]) is a commune in the Oise department in northern France. It is distinguished by the remains of its former abbey, including the current parish church, dating from the 12th century.

== See also ==
- Communes of the Oise department
