= Geremarus =

Frankish monk and abbot

Saint Geremarus
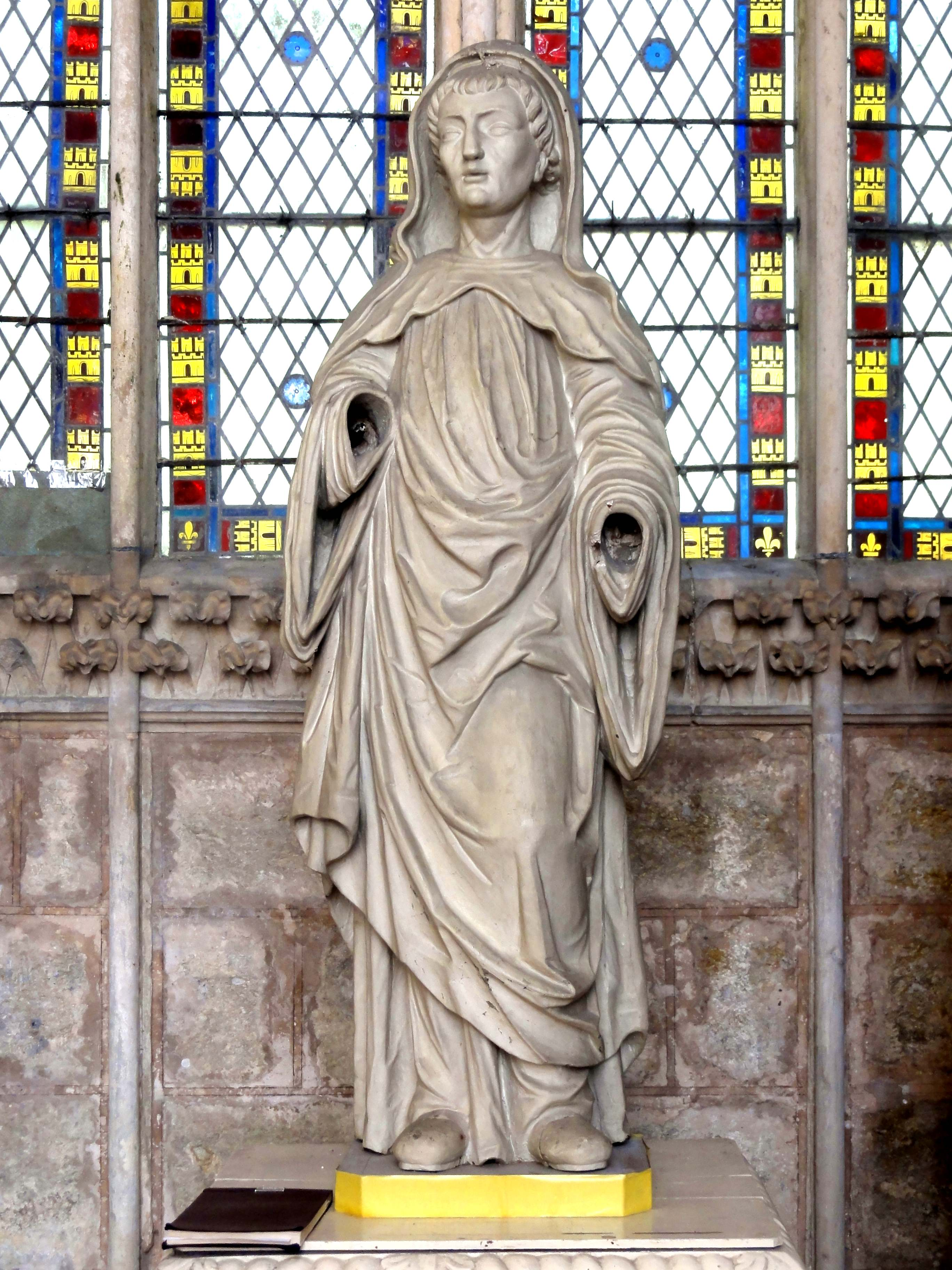
- Statue of Germer in the chapel of Saint-Germer-de-Fly Abbey
- Born: 608; Vardes, Neuf-Marché
- Died: 658 near Beauvais
- Feast: 24 September

Saint Geremarus (or Germer, Geremar, Geremaro; died 658) was a Frankish monk and abbot. His feast day is 24 September.

== Life ==
The oldest surviving biography of Saint Geremarus was composed in the 9th century, and was revised three centuries later, so its historical accuracy is dubious. It is said that he was born in Vardes, Neuf-Marché, 30 kilometres (19 mi) west of Beauvais, France, and was educated at the Episcopal School in Beauvais. He held high positions in the courts of the Merovingian kings Dagobert I (r. 629–639) and Clovis II (r. 639–657). He had two daughters and a son who died in infancy.

Geremarus met Audoin at Dagobert's court, and on his advice founded the Isle-sur-Epte Abbey (now Saint-Pierre-Bois). Audoin later ordained him as a priest. About 649 he moved to the Pental Abbey, where he became the superior, but left after a revolt against his leadership. Again on Audoin's advice he founded a new monastery in Fly, now Saint-Germer-de-Fly Abbey. He died about three years afterwards.

== Monks of Ramsgate account ==
The Monks of Ramsgate wrote in their Book of Saints (1921),

Geremarus (St.) Abbot (Sept. 24)
(7th century) Born A.D. 608, of rich and noble parents, the Merovingian King Dagobert I made him (with his friends Eloi and Ouen) Royal Councillors. By his saintly wife, Domana, he had three children, of whom the youngest, Amalberga, is honoured as a Saint. When free to do so, he entered a monastery, and later became its Abbot; but, after an attempt on his life, he retired for five years to a hermit’s cell. Finally, he founded another monastery near Beauvais, and a few years afterwards died a holy death as Abbot of the same (A.D. 658).

== Butler's account ==
The hagiographer Alban Butler (1710–1773) wrote in his Lives of the Fathers, Martyrs, and Other Principal Saints under September 24,

Saint Germer, or Geremar, Abbot

His parents, Rigobert and Aga, were of the prime nobility in the territory of Beauvais. He was born at their castle in the village Warandra, in the reign of King Clotaire; married a pious lady named Domana, and whilst yet a layman, built a monastery in honour of Saint Peter, called the Island, which was afterwards destroyed by the Normans, and is now an estate belonging to Saint Germer’s abbey. Germer, by the advice of Saint Owen, made his monastic profession in the monastery of Pental, in the territory of Rouen. He was soon after chosen abbot, but finding the monks averse to regularity he left the abbacy, and led an anchoretical life in a cave near the river Seine five years and six months. His only son Amalbert, dying, was buried in Saint Peter’s monastery. Germer, with the estate which reverted to him from his son’s death, founded the monastery of Fley or Flaviacum, now Saint Germer’s, five leagues from Beauvais towards Rouen, in which he assembled a community of fervent monks, in 655. Having governed this house three years and a half, he happily died on the 24th of September, 658. His body was interred in the church of his abbey, which soon after took his name. His relics, for fear of the Norman plunderers, were conveyed secretly to Beauvais, where they are still kept in the cathedral, except the bones of one arm, which have been given back to Saint Germer’s. In 1643 August Potier, bishop of Beauvais, placed monks of the congregation of Saint Maur in this abbey, and erected in it a great school for the humanity studies to the end of rhetoric.

== Sources ==
- Butler, Alban (1866), The Lives of the Fathers, Martyrs, and Other Principal Saints, vol. 9, James Duffy This article incorporates text from this source, which is in the public domain.
- Chlumský, Jan, "St. Geremar", catholica.cz (in Czech)
- St. Augustine's Abbey, Ramsgate (1921). The Book of saints : a dictionary of servants of God canonized by the Catholic Church. London: A. & C. Black, ltd. OCLC 671676136. This article incorporates text from this source, which is in the public domain.
