= Eudokia the Martyr =

Christian martyr

Saint Eudokia the Martyr
- Born: 3rd century Asia Minor or Anatolia
- Residence: Persia
- Feast: August 4
- Tradition or genre: Eastern Orthodox

Eudokia the Martyr (Ancient Greek: Εὐδοκία ἡ Μάρτυς) is a Christian saint and martyr from the 3rd century. According to Christian hagiographic accounts, she was deported along with thousands of other Christians by Shapur I. After strengthening her fellow believers in the face of persecution and converting Persian women, she was reportedly tortured in various ways, imprisoned multiple times, and eventually executed by beheading. She is venerated as a saint in the Eastern Orthodox Church, which commemorates her on August 4. However, some modern Orthodox hagiographers believe she might actually be a fictional character.

Traditionally, she should not be confused with the martyr Eudokia of Heliopolis, but just might have been identical to the latter.

== Biography ==
=== Hagiographic accounts ===
Known exclusively through Christian hagiographic accounts, which begin with her capture by the Persians, she is believed to have originated from Asia Minor or Anatolia. After being captured along with a relatively large number of Christians, up to 9,000, during a military campaign by Shapur I, Eudokia was reportedly deported to Persia and placed in the service of a Persian officer's family. Through her Christian actions, she managed to soften her captors before converting them. She then became involved in providing moral support to other deported Christians and in converting many Persian women. These activities attracted the wrath of the Persian authorities, who flogged her before imprisoning her for two months. After these two months, she reportedly appeared again before the Persian officials and refused once more to renounce Christianity, leading to her being beaten with thorny rods before being sent back to prison for six months. Upon her release, the episode allegedly repeated itself; this time, she would have been bound in thorns pressed against her naked body, tearing away strips of flesh, and then tied to a gibbet with ropes used to break her bones. Finally, the saint was beheaded by her executioners.

== Legacy ==
Her memory is celebrated on August 4 by the Eastern Orthodox Church; however, some modern Eastern Orthodox hagiographers express doubts about her existence. They believe she might possibly be confused with Eudokia of Heliopolis.
