= My Confession =

My Confession may refer to:

- My Confession (Nikolai Karamzin)
- Confession (Leo Tolstoy)

== See also ==
- Confessions
