= Franciszek Lekszycki =

Polish Catholic priest and painter (1600–1668)

- Born: 1600
- Died: December 1668; Grodno
- Occupations: Priest, monk, painter
- Religion: Roman Catholic
- Church: Latin Church

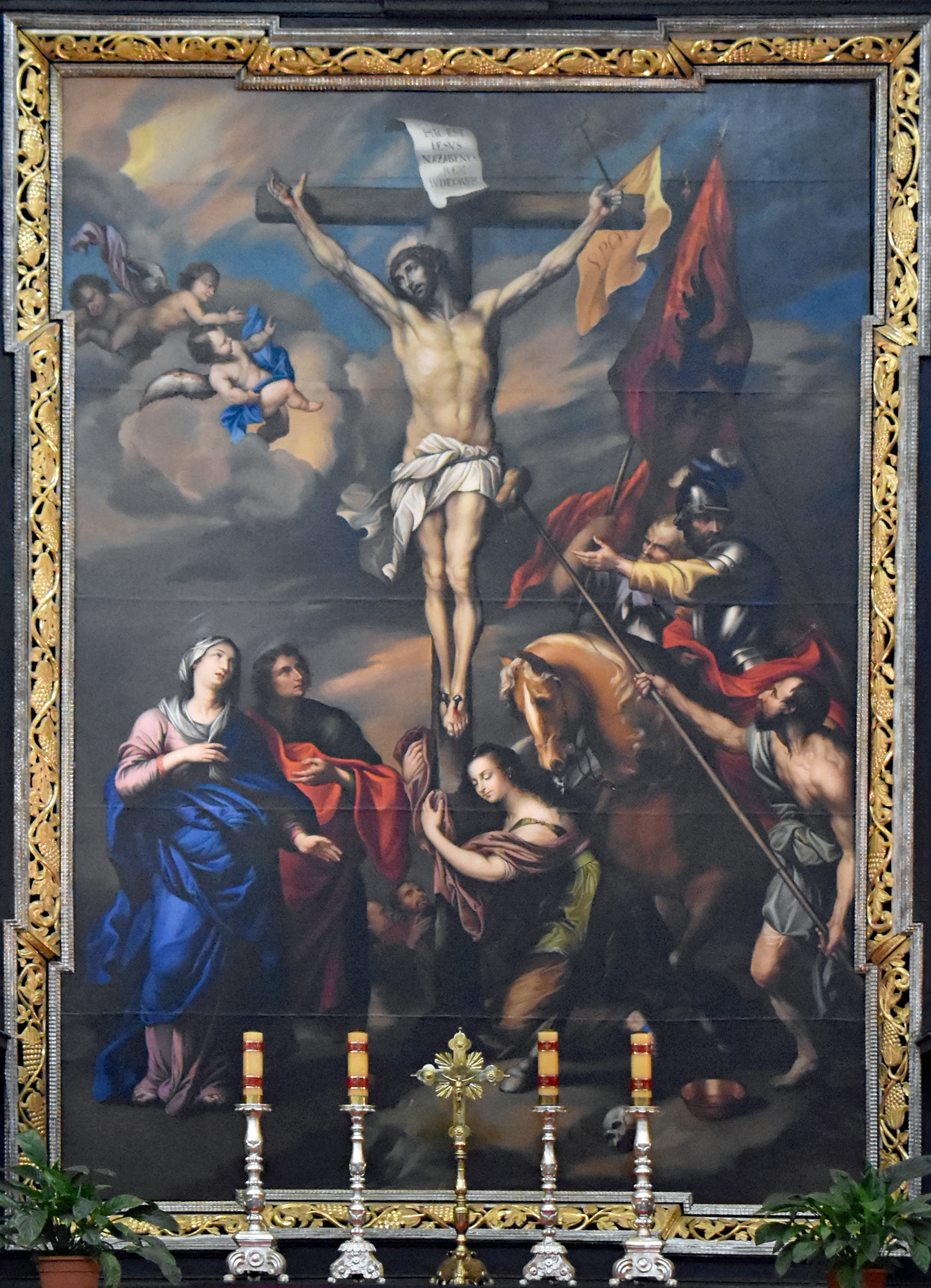
Crucifixion by Franciszek Lekszycki in Church of St. Bernardino of Siena, Kraków

Franciszek Lekszycki (born 1600; died December 1668 in Grodno) was a Polish Bernardine friar, Roman Catholic priest, and Baroque painter.

He was the son of Jan Lekszycki, owner of Mozgawa, and Anna née Międzygórska. He was educated among Bernardine monastic painters. His artistic style was strongly influenced by Flemish art, especially the works of Peter Paul Rubens and Anthony van Dyck, whose paintings he knew through contemporary engravings.

In 1641, commissioned by Jan Zebrzydowski, he decorated the Church of the Crucifixion at the Kalwaria Zebrzydowska sanctuary founded by Zebrzydowski with paintings (The Nailing to the Cross, The Death on the Cross, The Anointing), and also painted an image of Saint Anthony for the local Bernardine church. In 1645, he carried out painting work at the Bernardine monastery in Dubno, commissioned by Prince Dominik Zasławski.

He subsequently painted for the Bernardine monasteries in Przeworsk (St Barbara for the high altar and St Anthony of Padua for a side altar), and in Leżajsk (The Annunciation, David and Isaiah for the high altar, and The Conversion of St Mary Magdalene for a side altar). Between 1659 and 1664, Leszczycki was active in Kraków, where he created The Last Supper (for the high altar), Christ Falling under the Cross, Christ Given Gall to Drink, and St Anthony of Padua for his home monastery in the Stradom district. Around 1660, he painted The Virgin Mary Appearing to St John Cantius, now located in Borek Wielkopolski.

A number of other paintings have also been attributed to Leszczycki, including The Crucifixion in the Bernardine church in Lviv, St Francis in the Bernardine church in Vilnius, The Holy Family in the parish church at Głębowice, and paintings in Lublin Cathedral. In 1664 he is believed to have stayed in Poznań, and in 1667 he travelled to Grodno via Warsaw to execute paintings for the local Bernardine church. He died in Grodno in 1668.

== Bibliography ==
- Dzik, Janina (1993). "Flamandzkie wzory w twórczości malarza bernardyńskiego o. Franciszka Lekszyckiego". Nasza Przeszłość (in Polish). 79: 199–228. doi:10.52204/np.1993.79.199-228.
