= Thérèse Levasseur =

Domestic partner of Jean-Jacques Rousseau (1721–1801)

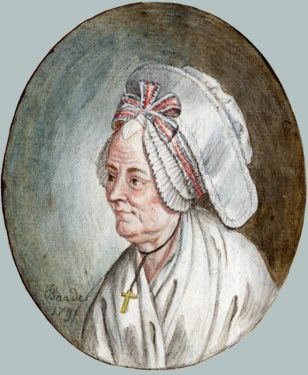
- Marie Thérèse Levasseur Veuve de Jean Jacques Rousseau, by Johann Michael Baader, aquarelle, 1791.
- Born: 21 September 1721; Orléans, France
- Died: 12 July 1801 (aged 79); Le Plessis-Belleville, France
- Spouse: Jean-Henri Bally (1779–1801, her death)
- Partner: Jean-Jacques Rousseau (1745–1778; his death)
- Children: 5

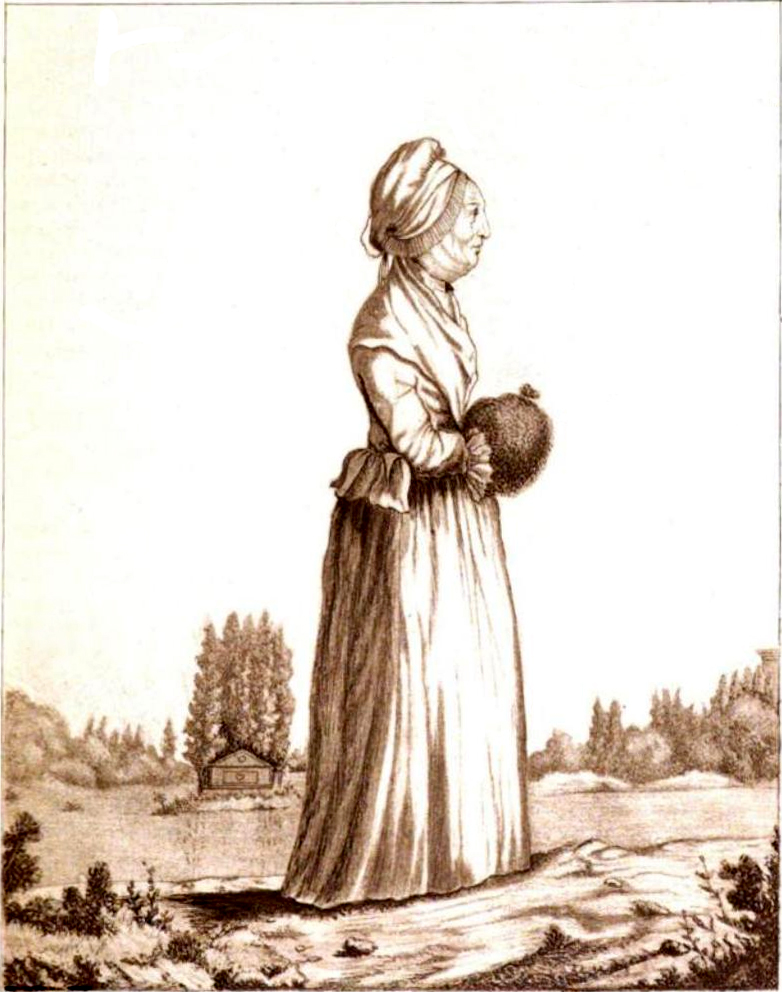
Portrait of Marie-Thérèse Le Vasseur by E. Charryère, after a sepia by Naudet.

Marie-Thérèse Levasseur ([tɛ.ʁɛz lə.va.sœʁ]; 21 September 1721 – 12 July 1801; also known as Thérèse Le Vasseur, Lavasseur) was the domestic partner, mistress, wife and widow of Genevan philosopher Jean-Jacques Rousseau.

== Biography ==
Thérèse Le Vasseur came from a respected family that had fallen on hard times; her father had a small official position relating to currency in Orléans, which he lost by 1744, and her mother was a shop-keeper; this business having failed, Thérèse and her mother moved to Paris to find work, and were later joined by her father.

Le Vasseur met Rousseau in Paris in 1745. Le Vasseur was working as a laundress and chambermaid at the Hotel Saint-Quentin in the rue des Cordiers, where Rousseau took his meals. She was 24 years old at the time, he was 33. According to Rousseau, Thérèse bore him five children, all of whom were given to the Enfants-Trouvés foundling home, the first in 1746 and the others in 1747, 1748, 1751, and 1752. Thérèse is described in Rousseau's Confessions as a woman of low intelligence, exploited by her family.

They went through a legally invalid marriage ceremony at Bourgoin on August 29, 1768. Therese provided Rousseau with support and care, and when he died, she was the sole inheritor of his belongings, including manuscripts and royalties.

After Rousseau's death in 1778, she married Jean-Henri Bally, a valet of René de Girardin, in November 1779. They lived together in Le Plessis-Belleville until her death in 1801.
