= The Confessor =

The Confessor may refer to:

- The Confessor (album), a 1985 album by Joe Walsh
  - "The Confessor" (song), a 1985 song by Joe Walsh
- The Confessor (film), a 2004 film
- The Confessor (novel), a 2003 novel by Daniel Silva

== See also ==
- Confessor (disambiguation)
- List of Confessors, a list of people with the Christian title Confessor of the Faith
