= Confesiones =

Confesiones may refer to:

- Confesiones (Monchy y Alexandra album), a 2002 album released by Dominican duo Monchy y Alexandra
- Confesiones (Obie Bermúdez album), a 2003 album released by Puerto-Rican singer Obie Bermúdez

== See also ==
- Confessions (disambiguation)
