= Painting of Our Lady of Consolation in Przeworsk =

Image of the Virgin Mary in the church in Przeworsk

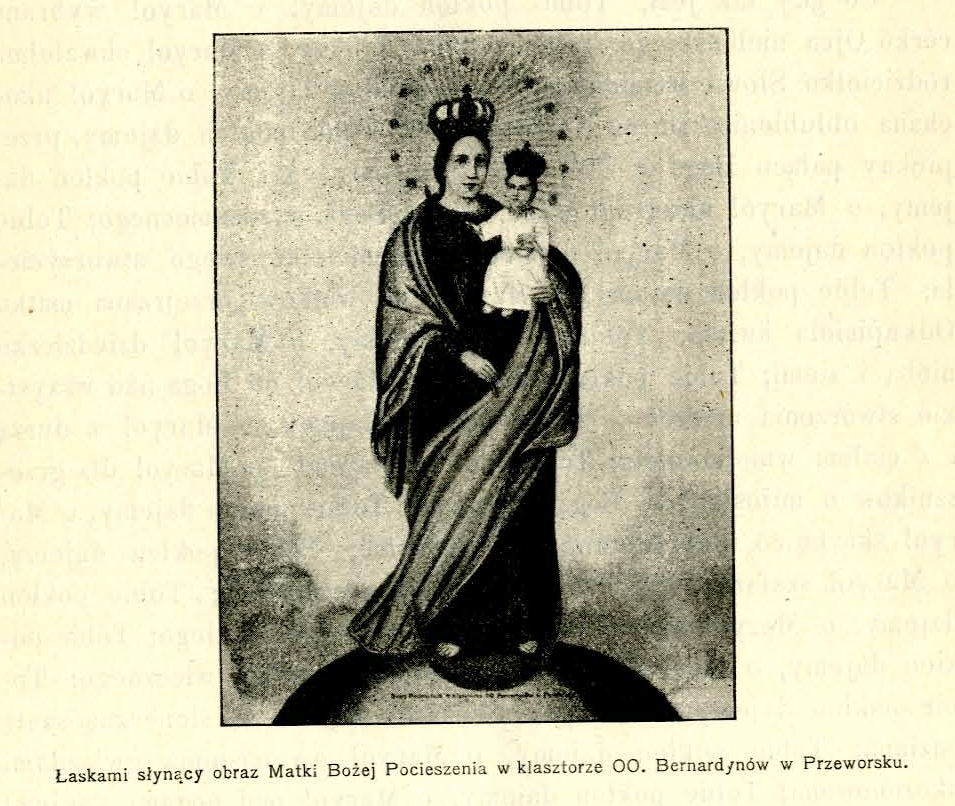
Reproduction of the painting of Our Lady of Consolation (without vestments) in the book Wykład litanii loretańskiej from 1903

The Painting of Our Lady of Consolation in Przeworsk is an image of the Blessed Virgin Mary located in the main altar of the Bernardine Church and Monastery of Saint Barbara, Przeworsk in Przeworsk, Poland, dating from the 17th century. It is venerated by Catholics and regarded as a miraculous image renowned for its graces.

The Baroque painting depicting the Virgin Mary with the Child has been revered in the Przeworsk Bernardine church since 1613. Evidence of its cult from the Old Polish period includes crowns, votive offerings, and vestments. Since at least the mid-17th century, the painting has been recognized as miraculous, and from the 18th century, it has been venerated under the title "Our Lady of Consolation". After a decline due to the policies of Josephinism, the cult was revived in 1896 by Father Felicjan Fierek. During the interwar period, Father Tadeusz Ukleja sought a papal coronation of the image, though these efforts were not completed.

Since 1962, the painting has been housed in the church's main altar. After 2015, there was a notable resurgence of the cult, leading to renewed efforts for the diocesan coronation of the Przeworsk Madonna, which took place on 8 September 2019.

== Description of the image ==
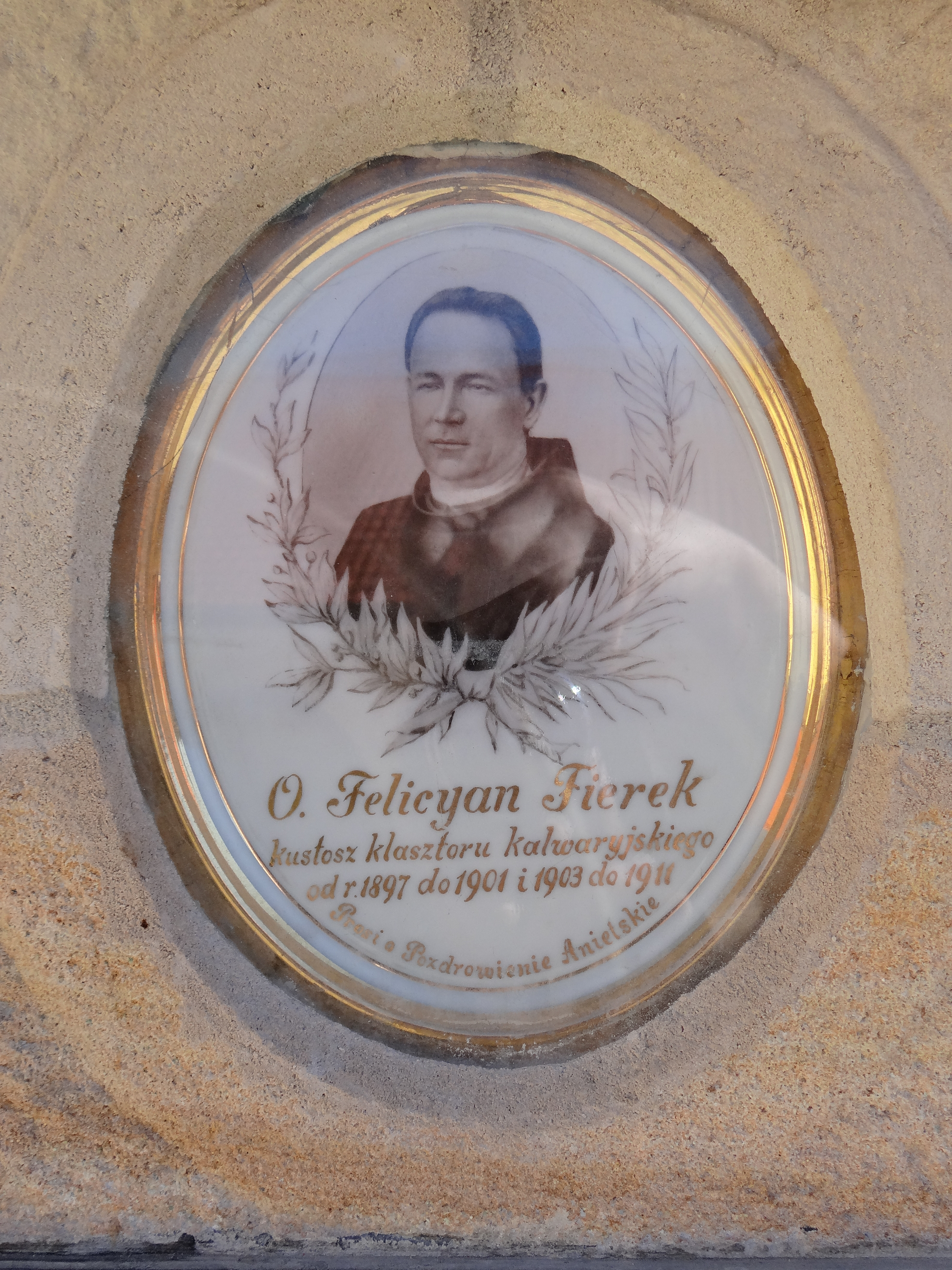
Father Felicjan Fierek (1850–1910), guardian of Przeworsk, renewer of the cult of Our Lady of Consolation

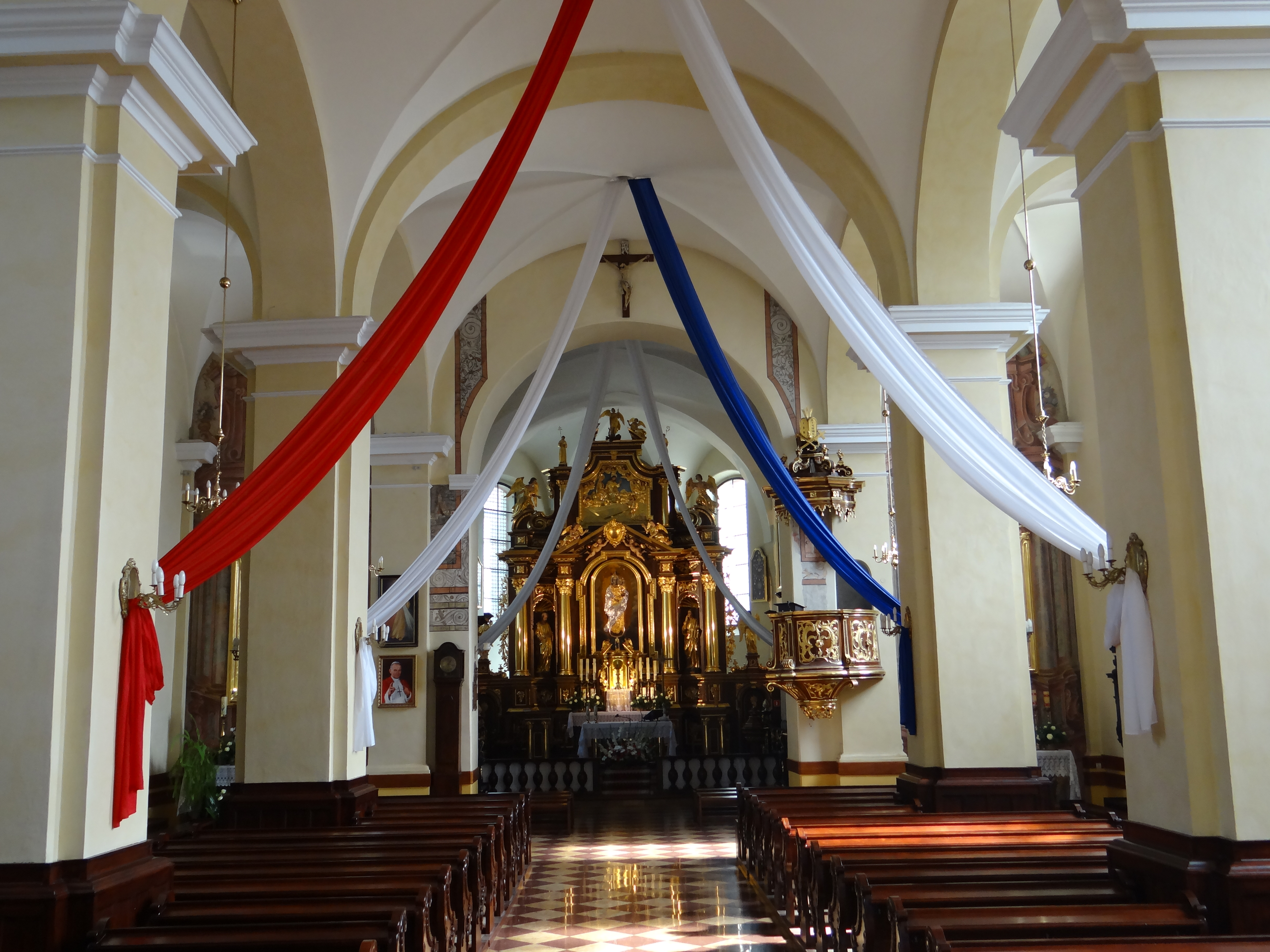
Painting of Our Lady of Consolation in the altar

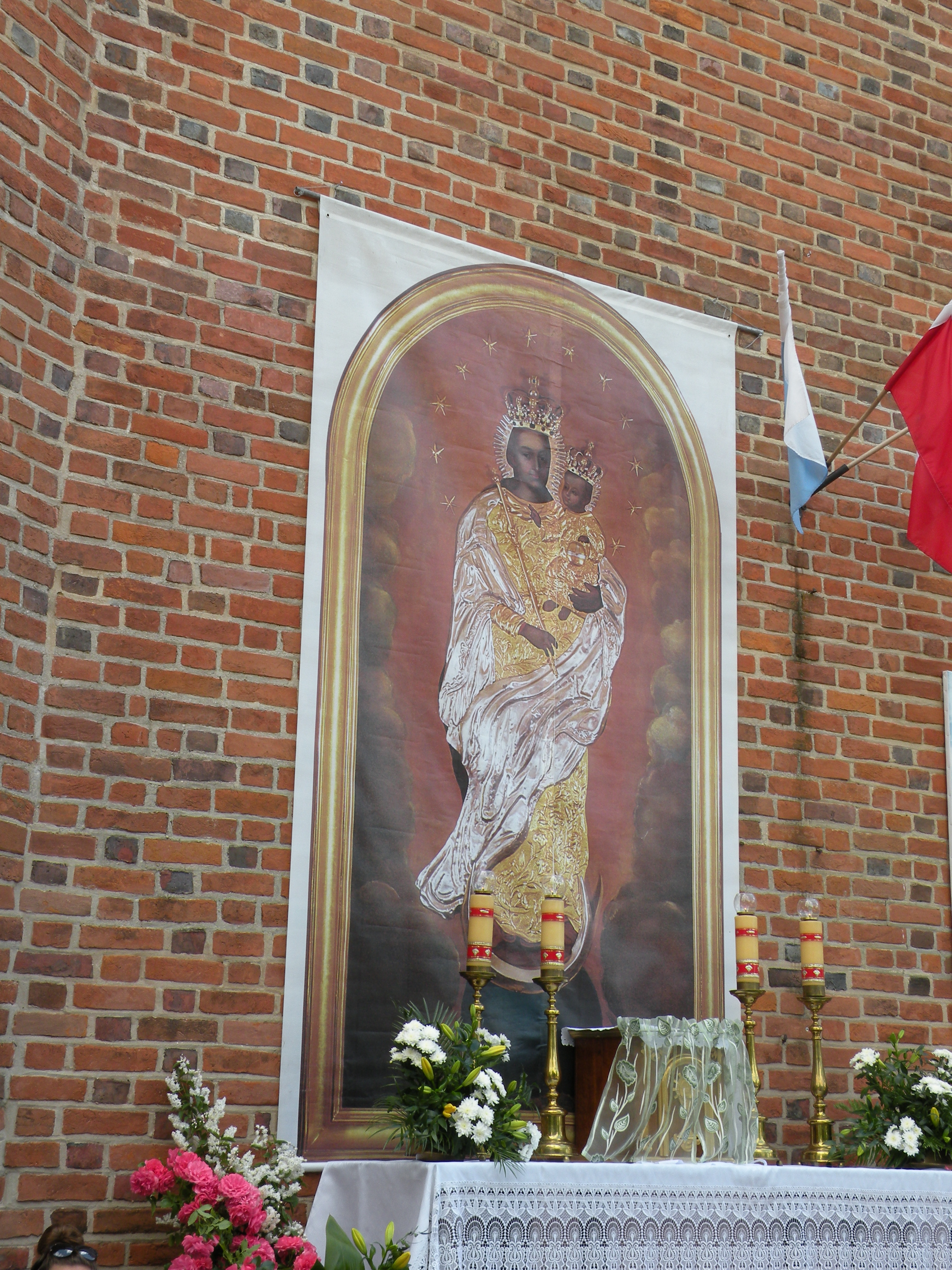
Copy of the painting of Our Lady of Consolation of Przeworsk placed in a field altar on the facade of the Bernardine church in Przeworsk during the Corpus Christi procession, 2017

The image of the Przeworsk Mary is an oil painting on canvas, measuring 260 × 140 cm. It depicts the Blessed Virgin Mary in full figure, holding the Child on her left arm, with the Child raising its hand in a gesture of blessing. Mary stands on a globe, surrounded by 12 stars around her face. She is dressed in a red gown and a dark blue mantle, with strings of pearls adorning her neck, while the Child wears a light tunic. The original colors of the garments are obscured by decorative metal vestments from the late 19th century. The artist is unknown. The work likely originated within the circle of Baroque Bernardine painting and was probably created by a monk. It was once attributed to Father Franciszek Lekszycki, though this is no longer widely accepted.

While most Marian paintings from the 17th century are copies of other works, the Przeworsk Our Lady of Consolation is considered a unique realization of an individual artist's vision.

== Historicity of the Marian cult ==
=== Old Polish period ===
The earliest record of the painting dates to 1613, when it was noted that Father Marek, a Bernardine, funded an altar for the Przeworsk Mary, indicating the painting predates this year:

1613: During the preaching of Father Marek, an altar of the Blessed Virgin was established.

— Cathalogus Benefactorum Praecipuorum Loci Przeorscensis

The painting was initially placed in a side altar of the monastic church. From the outset, Our Lady in the Przeworsk image was venerated by the faithful. 10 years after its installation, in 1623, votive crowns were added, funded by Dorota Bogusławska, a Przeworsk townswoman.

By 1647, the painting was described as "miraculous" in Father Bernardyn Kaliski's work Laconicum novellae Provinciae Russiae, which documented Bernardine monasteries in the Russian province. Promoting the Marian cult associated with Our Lady of Consolation was a key aspect of the Bernardines' pastoral work, which enjoyed significant popularity in the town. This activity aligned with the post-Tridentine renewal of the church, emphasizing the role of the Blessed Virgin Mary.

From the 17th century, the church became a favored site for prayer and pilgrimage, attracting not only Przeworsk townspeople but also local nobility. The faithful experienced numerous graces and healings through the intercession of the Virgin Mary, evidenced by votive offerings placed on and around the painting.

Marian devotion was fostered by confraternities active at the Przeworsk Bernardine church: the Rosary, the Scapular, and the Immaculate Conception of the Blessed Virgin Mary.

In 1750, the painting was adorned with a silver vestment donated by Franciszek Lisiewicz.

The title "Our Lady of Consolation" has been applied to the Przeworsk Madonna at least since the 18th century.

=== Under Austrian Partition ===
The policies of Josephinism under Austrian rule hindered the development of the cult of Our Lady of Consolation in Przeworsk. Restrictions on Marian shrines included bans on pilgrimages, processions, additional services, and other interventions in pastoral care. An imperial decree in 1786 confiscated the votive offerings and vestments from the painting, significantly weakening the cult. It was not until 1896 that Father Felicjan Fierek revived devotion to Our Lady of Consolation of Przeworsk, an act of gratitude for the monastery avoiding dissolution, which the monks attributed to Mary's intercession. At that time, the painting was moved to the 18th-century chapel adjoining the church's northern nave.

The Baroque Revival altar housing the Przeworsk Madonna was crafted by local woodcarver Antoni Rarogiewicz. Surrounding the painting was an inscription from a hymn honoring Our Lady of Consolation: "Mother, console us, for we weep; Mother, lead us, for we perish; Mother, do not abandon us". Mary and the Child were then adorned with copper vestments and crowns, though no official coronation occurred.

Evidence of the cult from this period includes a reproduction of the painting in Father Franciszek Jarniński's book Wykład litanii loretańskiej (Explanation of the Litany of Loreto), published in Płock.

=== Interwar period ===
The interwar period was a favorable time for the cult's development in Przeworsk, with devotion extending beyond the local area. The guardian at the time, Father Tadeusz Ukleja, pursued official efforts for a papal coronation of the painting. On 10 February 1926, he sent a letter to the diocesan curia in Przemyśl, requesting permission to initiate the coronation process for Our Lady of Consolation.

In the introduction, he outlined his motivation:

I consider it my duty to present to the Most Honorable and Most Reverend Diocesan Curia the glory and honor given to the Blessed Virgin in the Przeworsk monastery for centuries, in order to request the Curia's grace in appointing a Spiritual Commission to investigate my words, confirm the faith of the people, and permit efforts to obtain from His Holiness the privilege of coronation.

— Father Tadeusz Ukleja, Letter to the Przemyśl Curia regarding coronation, 1926

The request was divided into three parts, reflecting the requirements for images to be crowned:

- antiquitas cultus – proof of the cult's antiquity:
  - origins dating to the early 17th century,
  - votive practices from 1623–1640 and 1750,
  - confiscation of votives by the Austrians,
  - private devotion during the partitions,
  - revival of the cult by Father Felicjan Fierek at the faithful's request in 1896,
- copia gratiarum – descriptions of 10 miracles and graces from 1903–1924, including:
  - healing of a six-year-old boy from Łańcut,
  - recovery of a woman in labor from Rudna Wielka,
  - cure of a woman with mental illness from Budy Łańcuckie,
- concursus populi – evidence of current devotion:
  - details of indulgences,
  - acts of piety by the faithful,
  - belief in the image's miraculous nature.

On 10 April 1926, Bishop Anatol Nowak responded positively, expressing joy at the initiative and announcing the formation of a coronation commission to interview witnesses. He recommended gathering more testimonies of graces received.

Ultimately, the interwar efforts for papal coronation were not completed, likely due to a change in the guardian position, the economic crisis of the 1930s, and the outbreak of World War II.

From this period, Father Tadeusz Ukleja also established a book of graces in 1925, titled Cuda i łaski doznane za przyczyną Matki Bożej Pocieszenia i Świętego Antoniego Padewskiego (Miracles and Graces Received Through the Intercession of Our Lady of Consolation and St. Anthony of Padua), which recorded thanksgivings until 1960. In addition to the miracles cited in the coronation letter, it documented several more graces, primarily healings, as well as thanks for family harmony and safe returns from war.

Devotees offered numerous votive gifts, with women who experienced special graces most commonly donating beads.

=== Post-World War II ===
In 1952, Bishop Franciszek Barda established an indulgence for Our Lady of Consolation in Przeworsk, setting the feast day as the last Sunday of August. On 26 August 1962, at the initiative of Guardian Father Gracjan Ożóg, the painting was moved from the side chapel to the church's main altar. The Baroque Revival altarpiece, crafted by Antoni Rarogiewicz between 1898 and 1900, features the painting in its central niche, with an image of St. Barbara on the slide. Flanking the Przeworsk Our Lady of Consolation are statues of St. Joseph and St. John the Evangelist. Above is the inscription Ista est speciosa inter filias Ierusalem (She is beautiful among the daughters of Jerusalem), and at the top, a relief depicting the granting of the Porziuncola indulgence.

In 1973, a bell was dedicated to Our Lady of Consolation of Przeworsk. The painting underwent conservation in 1972 and 2008.

=== 21st century ===
The revival of the Marian cult of Our Lady of Consolation in the second decade of the 21st century is credited to Father Marceli Ryszard Gęśla, guardian of the monastery from 2011 to 2015. He initiated research into the history of devotion to the Przeworsk Madonna, composed prayers and hymns, and introduced new devotions.

On 8 December 2015, the guardian announced plans to create Votive Crowns of Gratitude to mark 400 years of Our Lady of Consolation's presence in the Bernardine church, the first such initiative in Przeworsk's history. Within a short time, the faithful donated several hundred votive offerings for the crowns, with contributors from Przeworsk, nearby towns and villages, and abroad. A new book of miracles was established to record thanksgivings for graces received through the Przeworsk Mary's intercession.

At the request of Guardian Father Kazimierz Kowalski, Archbishop Adam Szal formed a coronation commission in 2017 to examine the cult historically, liturgically, and pastorally, aiming to achieve the episcopal coronation of the Przeworsk Our Lady of Consolation image. The coronation took place on 8 September 2019.

== See also ==
- Our Lady of Consolation
