= Confessor (disambiguation) =

In Christianity, a confessor is a priest who hears confession and then gives absolution.

Confessor may also refer to:

== Christianity ==
- Confessor of the Faith, a saint persecuted but not martyred for their beliefs

== Other uses ==
- Confessor (band), a doom metal band
- Confessor (novel), the eleventh novel in Terry Goodkind's Sword of Truth series
  - Confessor, a fictional occupation from The Sword of Truth series
- Confessor, a unit in Command & Conquer 3
- Itirafçı, former members of the PKK working with Turkish security forces (the word is often translated "confessor")
- Confessor (DC Comics), fictional villain from DC Comics

== See also ==
- List of Confessors, a list of people with the Christian title Confessor of the Faith
- The Confessor (disambiguation)
