= Church of St. Bernardino of Siena, Kraków =

Roman Catholic church in Kraków, Poland

Church of St. Bernardino of Siena
- Kościół św. Bernardyna ze Sieny
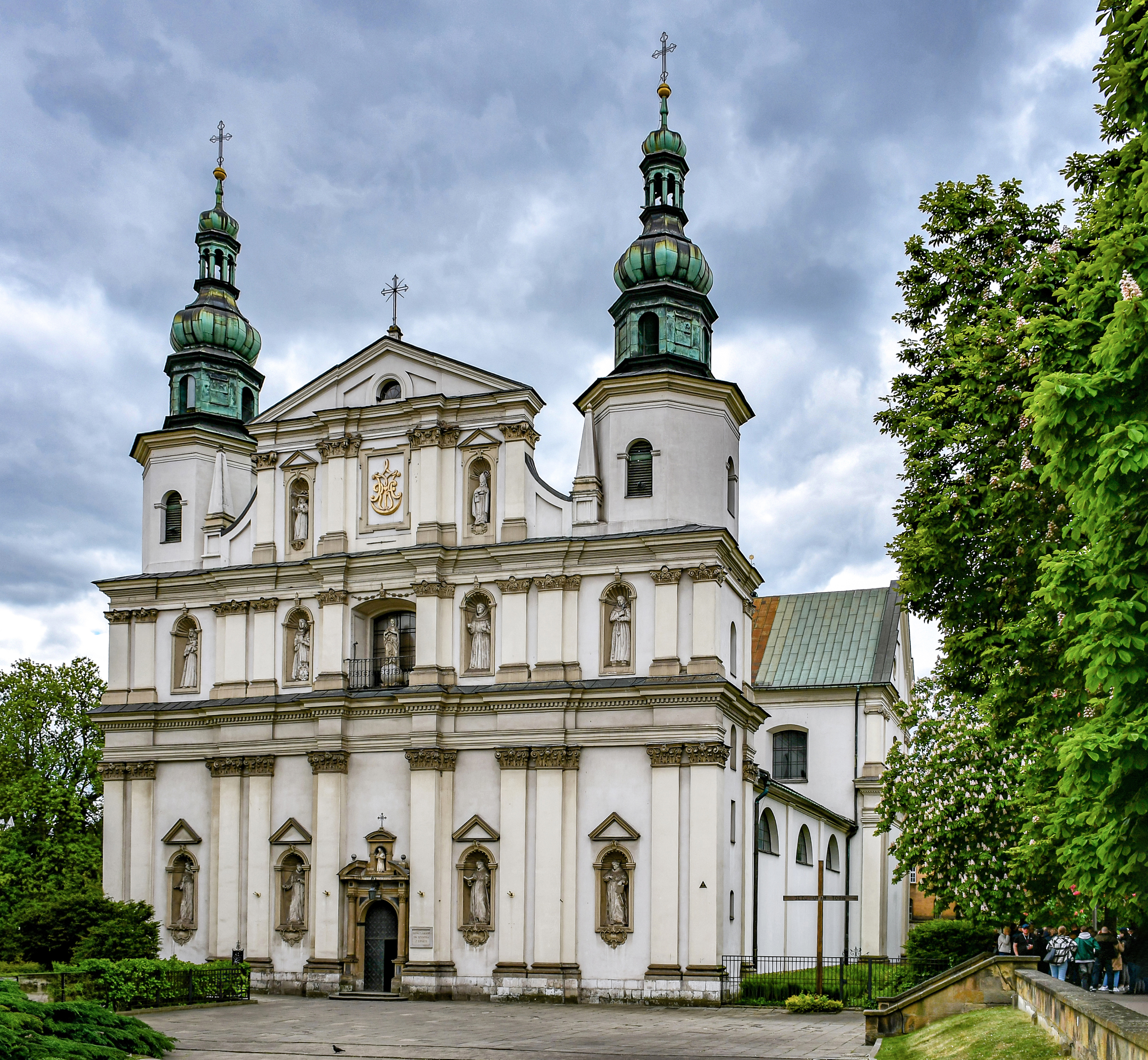
- Church façade (2025)
- Church of St. Bernardino of Siena
- 50°3′12.3″N 19°56′18″E
- Location: Kraków
- Address: 2 Bernardyńska Street
- Country: Poland
- Denomination: Catholic Church
- Tradition: Latin Church
- Website: https://krakow.bernardyni.pl/

History
- Status: Sanctuary of St. Szymon of Lipnica in Kraków
- Dedication: Bernardino of Siena

Architecture
- Groundbreaking: 1659

Specifications
- Materials: brick

UNESCO World Heritage Site
- Type: Cultural
- Criteria: iv
- Designated: 1978
- Part of: Historic Centre of Kraków
- Reference no.: 29
- Region: Europe and North America

Historic Monument of Poland
- Designated: 1994-09-08
- Part of: Kraków historical city complex
- Reference no.: M.P. 1994 nr 50 poz. 418

The Church of St. Bernardino of Siena (Polish: Kościół św. Bernardyna ze Sieny), known colloquially as the Bernardines Church (Polish: Kościół bernardynów) is a historic Roman Catholic conventual church and monastery of the Bernardines located at 2 Bernardyńska Street in Stradom, the former district of Kraków, Poland.

The first church and monastery, built in the mid-15th century, were the earliest seats of the Observant Franciscans in Poland, known as the Bernardines after the church. Destroyed during the Swedish Deluge, the complex was rebuilt as a Baroque temple in the years 1659–1680 according to the design of Krzysztof Mieroszewski.

== History ==
The Franciscan Observant doctrine appeared in Poland in 1453 with the arrival of John of Capistrano, at the invitation of King Casimir IV Jagiellon and the Bishop of Kraków, Cardinal Zbigniew Oleśnicki. John of Capistrano delivered many captivating sermons in Kraków, preaching the teachings of his mentor St. Bernardino of Siena. Under his influence, many students at the University of Kraków wished to live according to the teachings of St. Francis of Assisi, and this led to the establishment of Poland's first Observant monastery in the Stradom district of Kraków, dedicated to St. Bernardino of Siena. John of Capistrano arrived in Kraków on August 28, 1453, and the monastery was founded only 10 days later.

The site for its construction was donated by Cardinal Zbigniew Oleśnicki. It was later enlarged by a royal donation. To distinguish from the already present Franciscan Friars who represented the conventual movement, the Observants came to be called "Bernardines" after the name of the Kraków monastery. Cardinal Zbigniew Oleśnicki acquired a property on Stradom from his brother Jan Głowacz Oleśnicki, the Voivode of Sandomierz, and donated it to the monks. The church and the monastery were initially wooden.

Almost immediately, the construction of a brick Gothic church was begun. After Oleśnicki's death, the work was continued by Jan Długosz, who completed the chancel. The construction was further financed by the Sandomierz castellan Jan Hińcza of Rogów, as well as the townsmen Marcin Bełza and Paweł Ber. The building was completed at the end of the 15th century.

In 1645–1647, the Gothic body of the church was completely rebuilt by the funds of Stanisław Lubomirski, voivode of Kraków, and Zofia Ługowska of Zakliczyn. During the Swedish Deluge, it was entirely destroyed.

The present early Baroque church was built between 1659 and 1680. It is a three-aisled basilica with a transept and a dome concealed within the roof, likely for strategic reasons. Artillery fire from the Wawel Hill could have damaged an exposed dome. The new building was erected according to the design of the architect Krzysztof Mieroszewski. The construction of the new church was funded by Stanisław Witkowski, castellan of Sandomierz, and Zofia Ługowska of Zakliczyn.

A cemetery once adjoined the Bernardine complex, enclosed by a wall and accessed by a gate from Stradomska Street. This Baroque gate (1767) featured three portals and was crowned with seven statues of saints, with a figure of the Immaculate Virgin Mary in the center. In the early 19th century, demolition works in the area led to the removal of parts of the monastery buildings and the cemetery. After 1830, the gate and adjoining wall sections were also demolished. The only remnant is a statue of the Virgin Mary standing on a column at the former cemetery site, at the corner of Stradomska and Bernardyńska Streets, at the foot of Wawel Hill.

In 1883, the master mason Alfred Zajączkowski carried out works related to the expansion of the monastery buildings. In 1907, according to the design of Jan Sas-Zubrzycki, the refectory, library, porter's lodge, and the entrance gate from Bernardyńska Street were expanded.

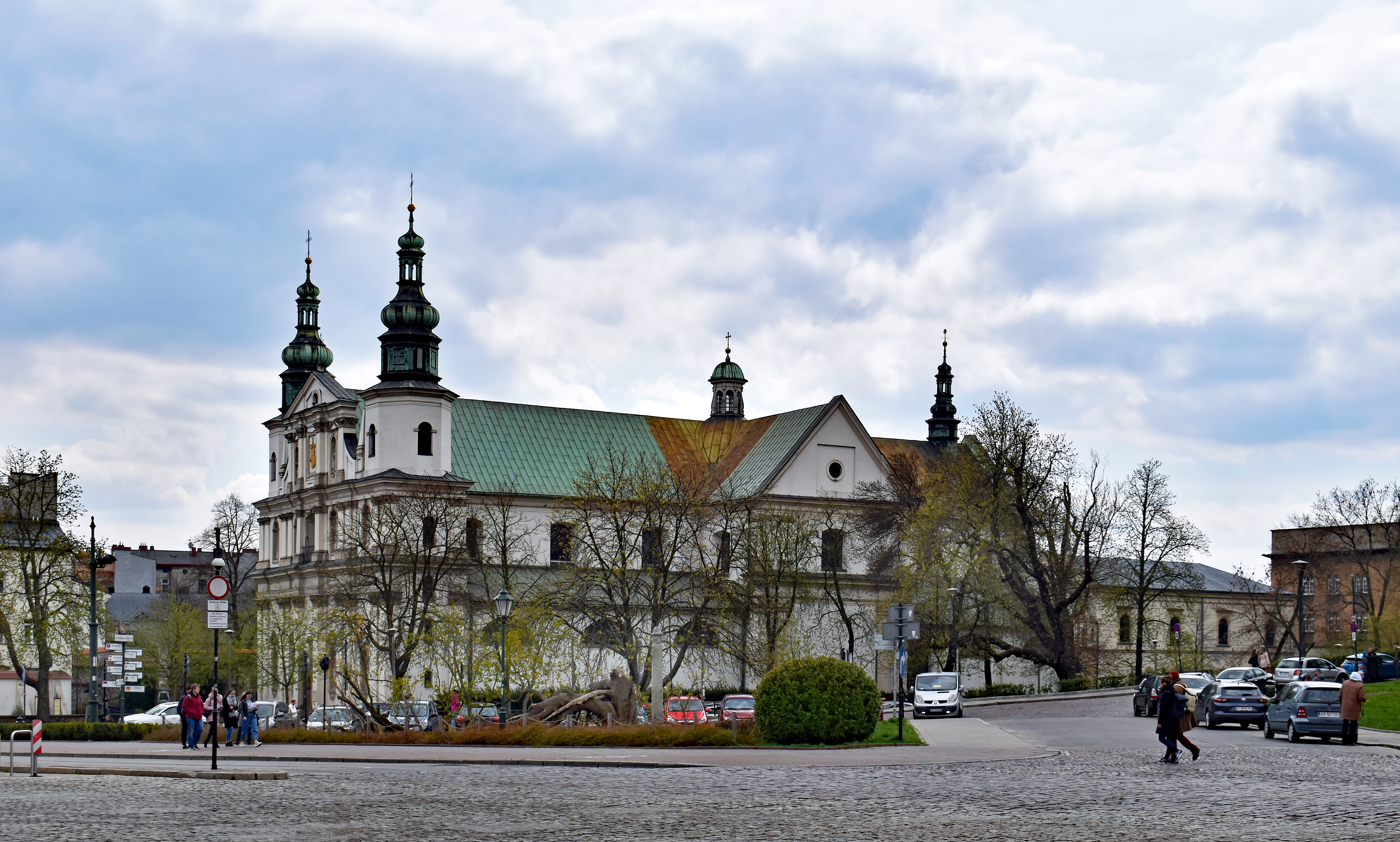
Church and Bernardine monastery seen from the north, from Grodzka Street

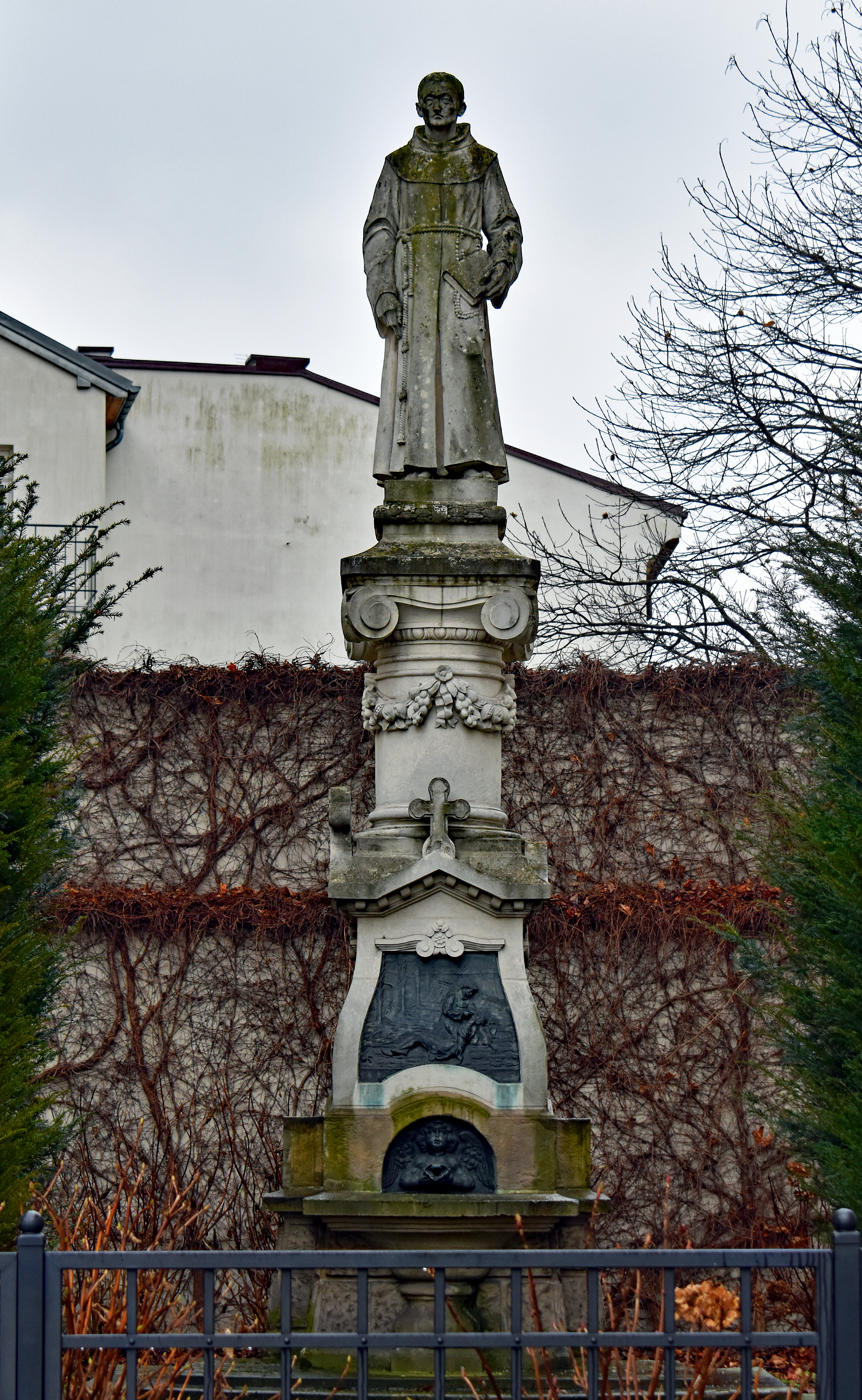
Monument to St. Simon in front of the church (1907), by Jan Sas-Zubrzycki

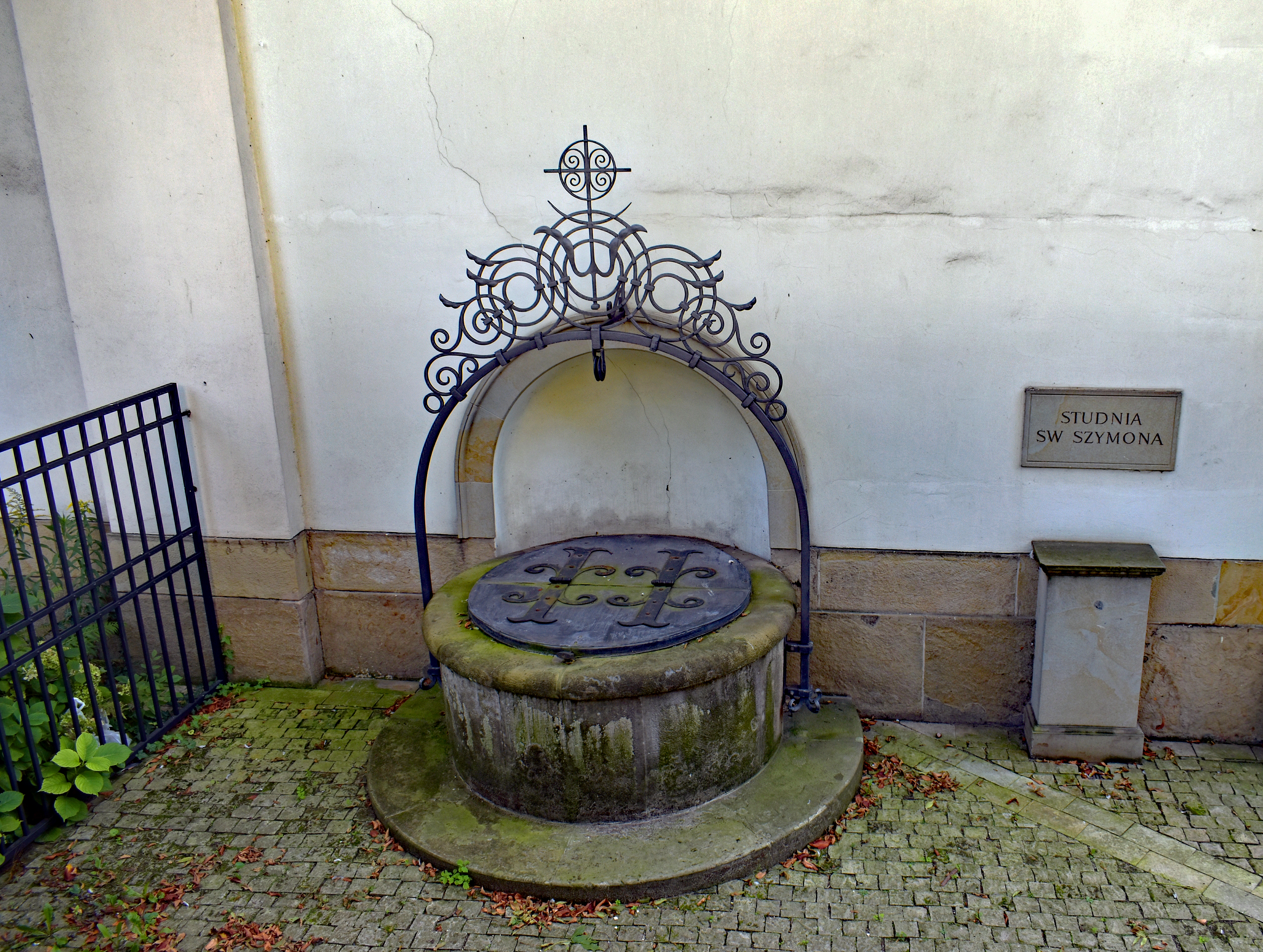
Well of St. Simon, next to the monastery gate

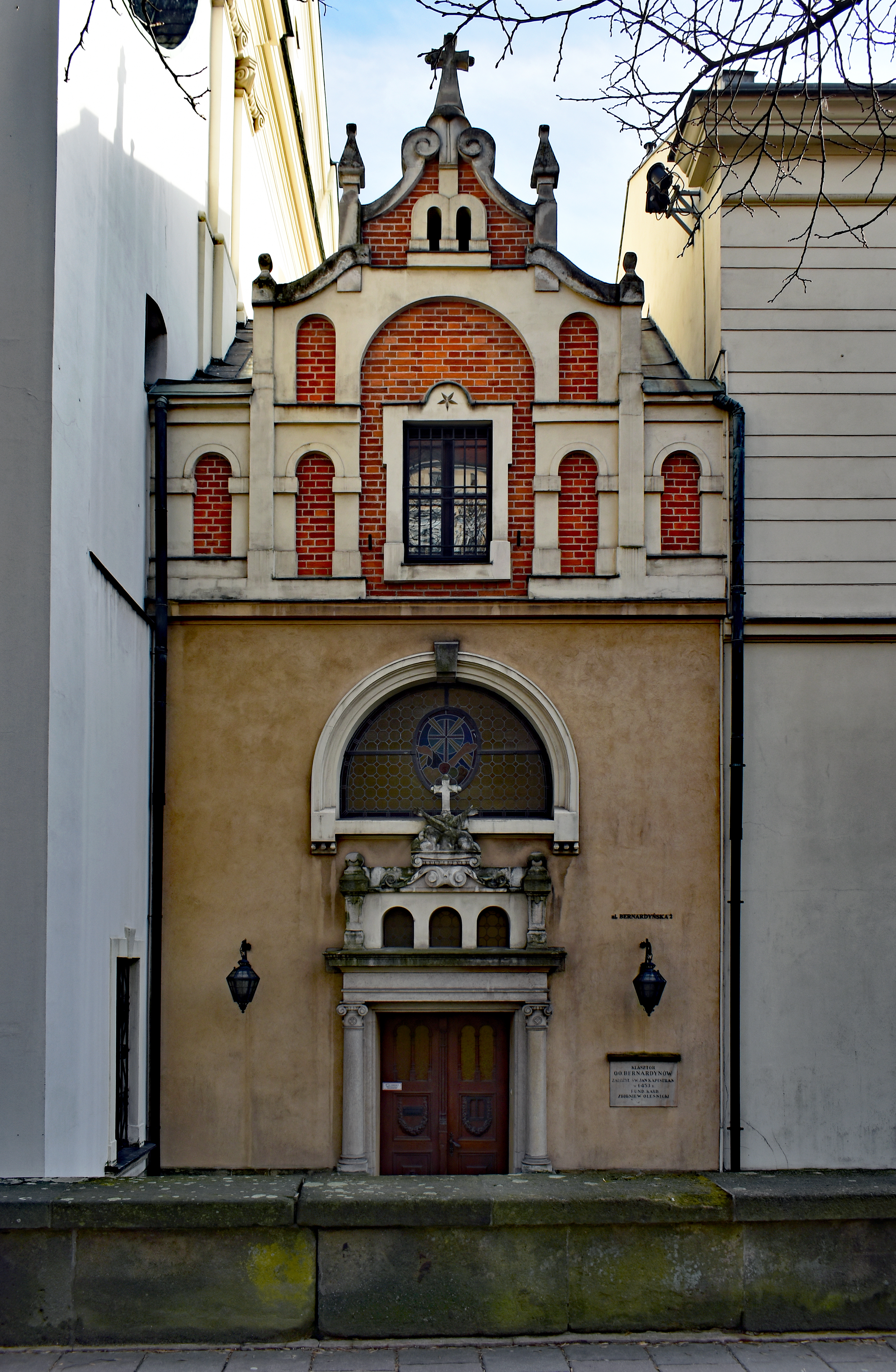
Monastery gate designed by Jan Sas-Zubrzycki (1907)

== Architecture ==
The church is a three-aisled basilica with a transept. The chancel is slightly narrower than the nave and closed with a straight wall. The façade has two towers, and the dome is hidden under the roof. In the church vestibule there are late Renaissance tombstones of Stanisław and Zofia Ługowski. The vaulting of the nave and chancel is decorated with elaborate stucco ornamentation.

Chapel of St. Anne, ocated in the left arm of the transept. It contains a late Baroque altar from the second half of the 18th century with a sculpture of Virgin and Child with Saint Anne from the late 15th century, probably from the workshop of Veit Stoss. On the chapel wall hangs the Baroque painting Dance of Death (4th quarter of the 17th century).

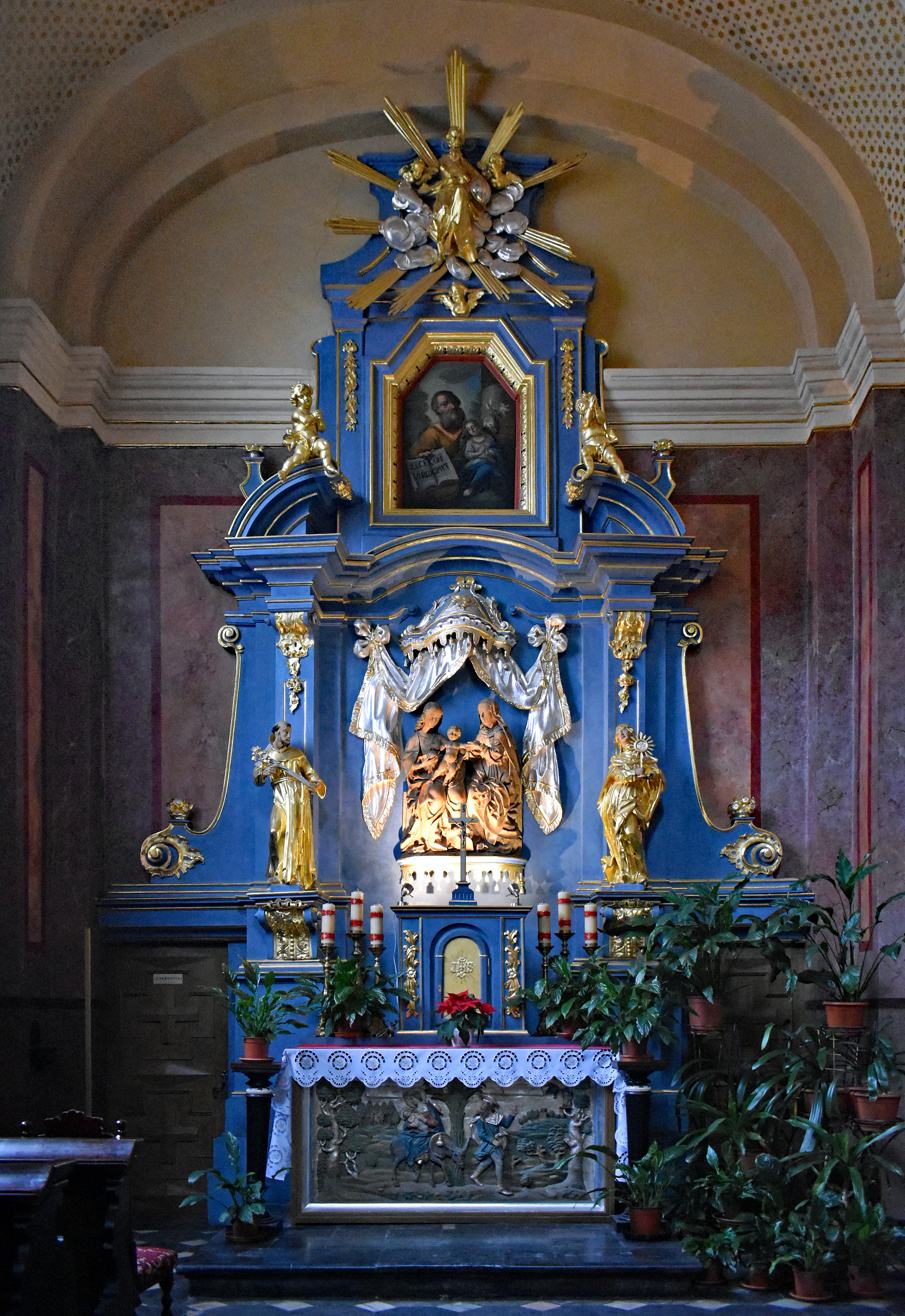
Altar in the Chapel of St. Anne

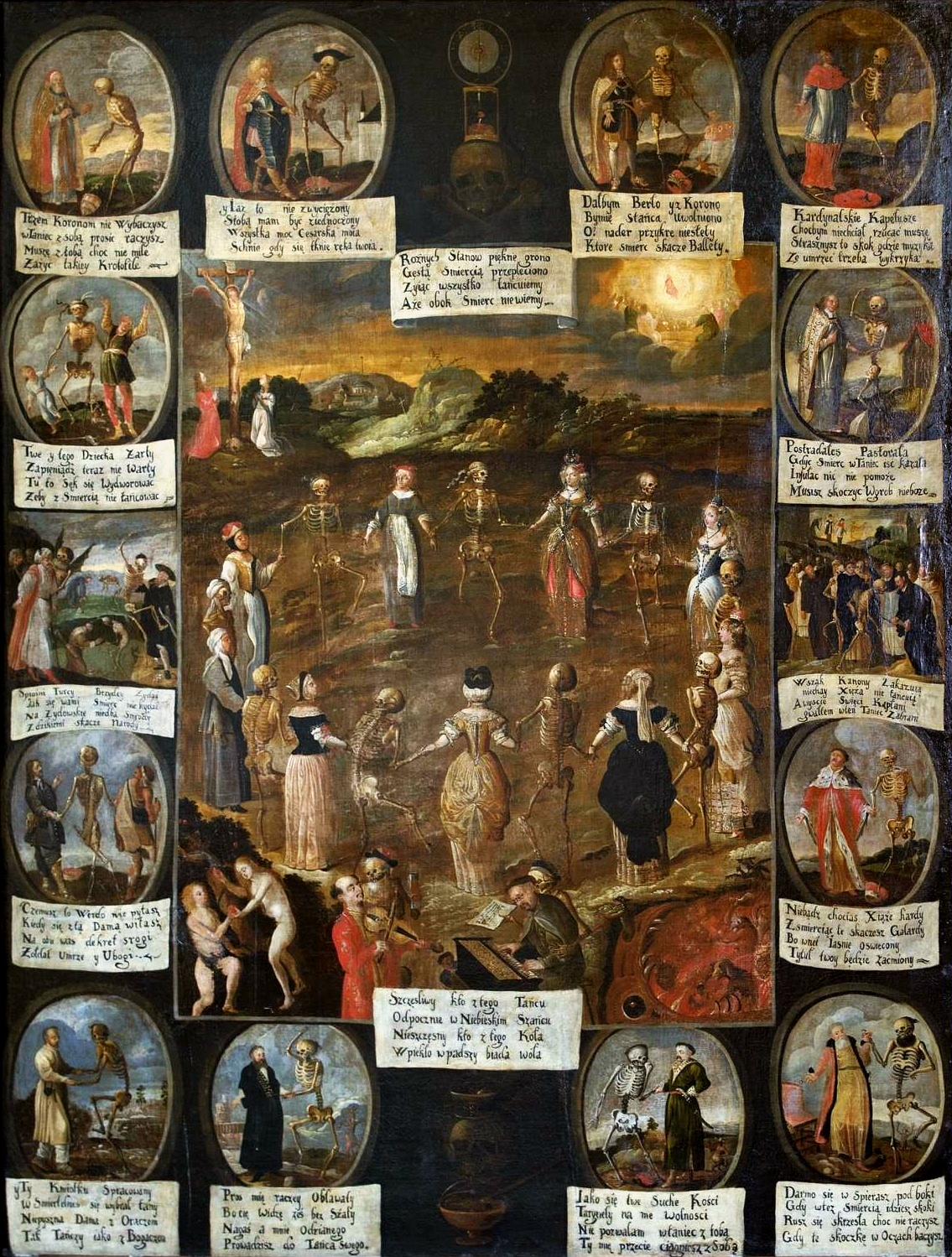
Dance of Death

Located in the right arm of the transept Chapel of St. Szymon of Lipnica contains an altar-mausoleum made in 1662. In the altar mensa there is the confessio of St. Szymon with a statue. The chapel window is decorated with a stained glass window depicting scenes from the life of Simon, designed by Józef Mehoffer and executed by the Kraków stained-glass workshop "B. Bączek".

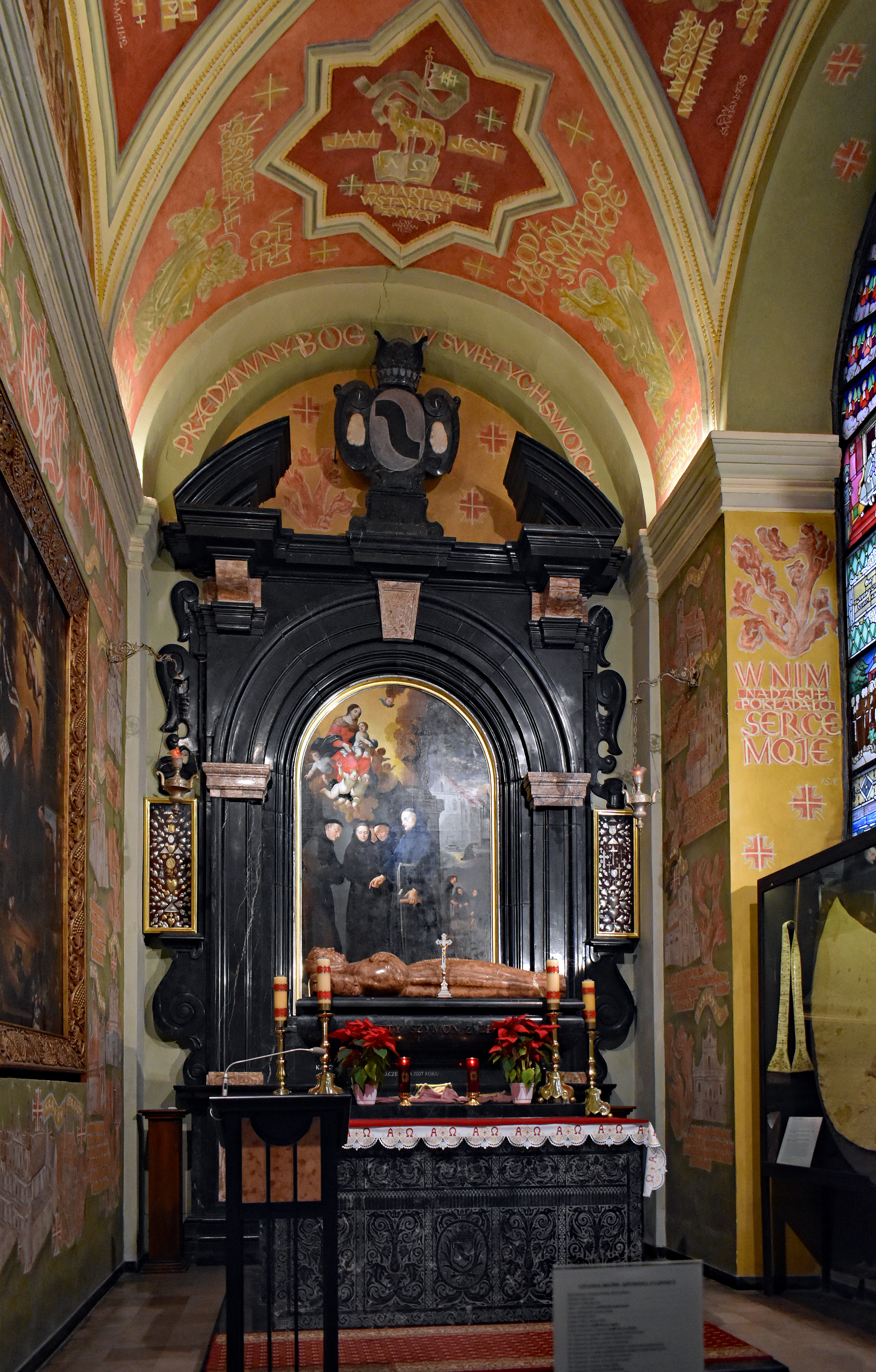
Chapel of St. Simon

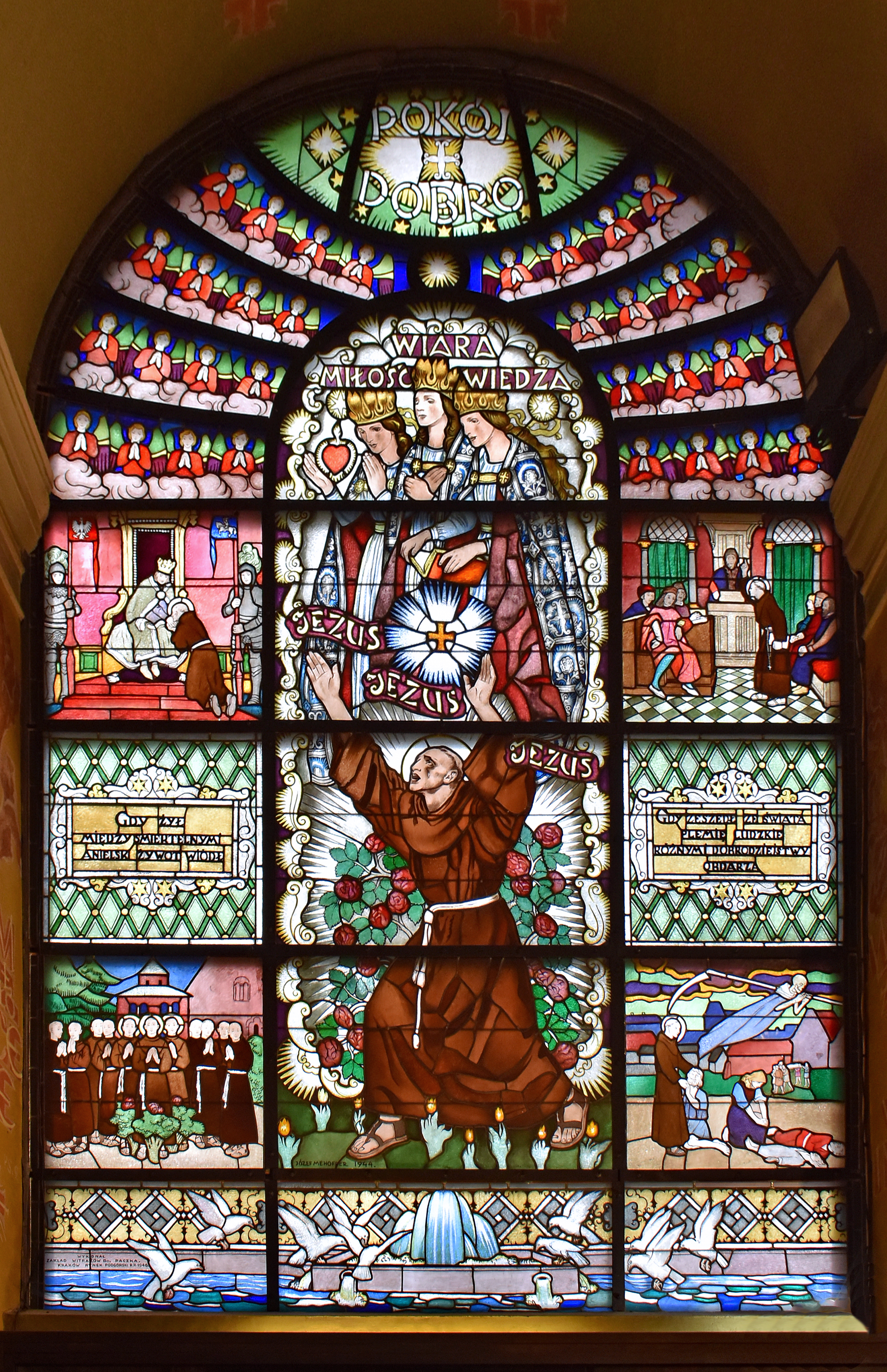
Stained glass designed by Józef Mehoffer
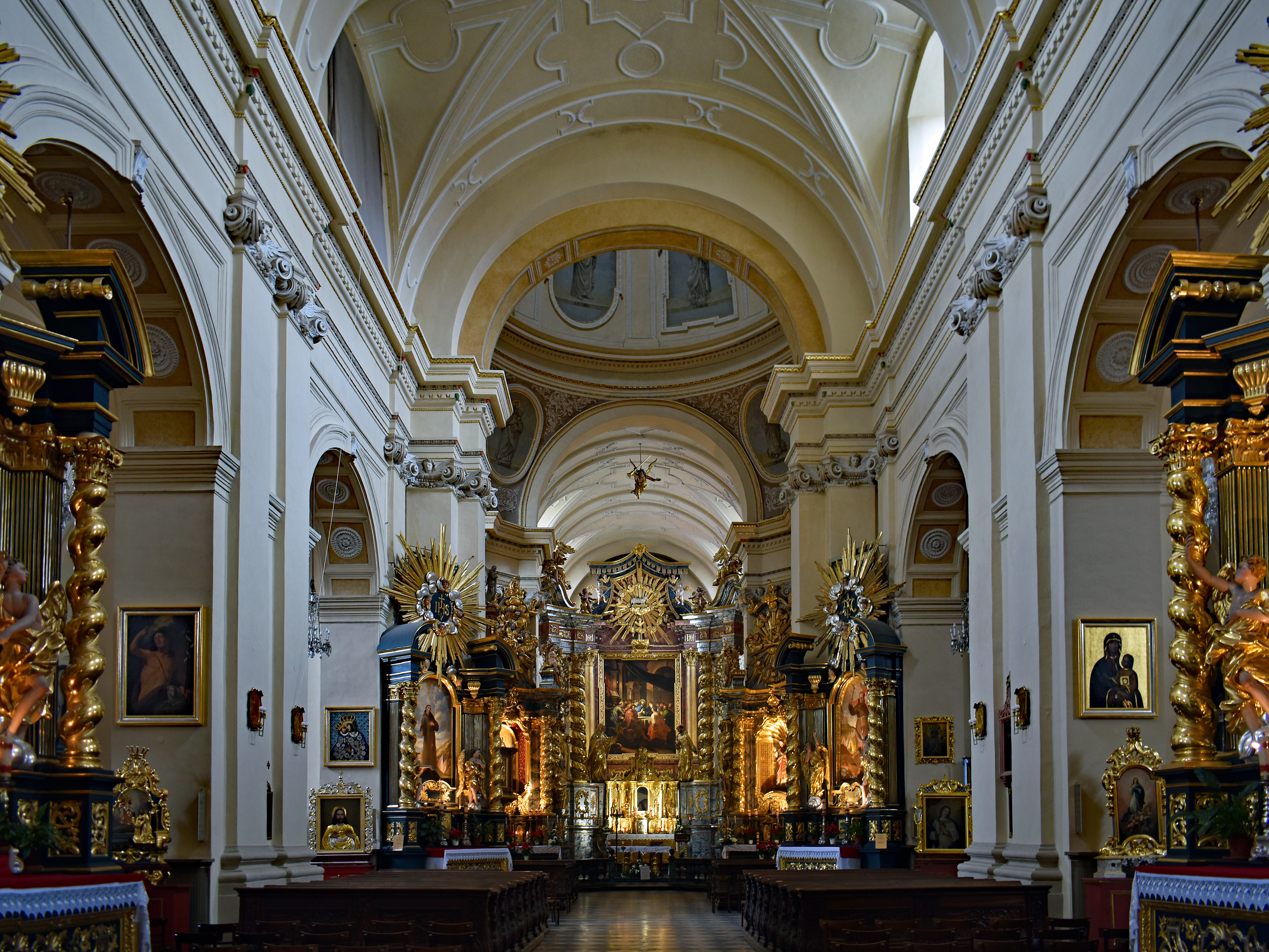
Main nave

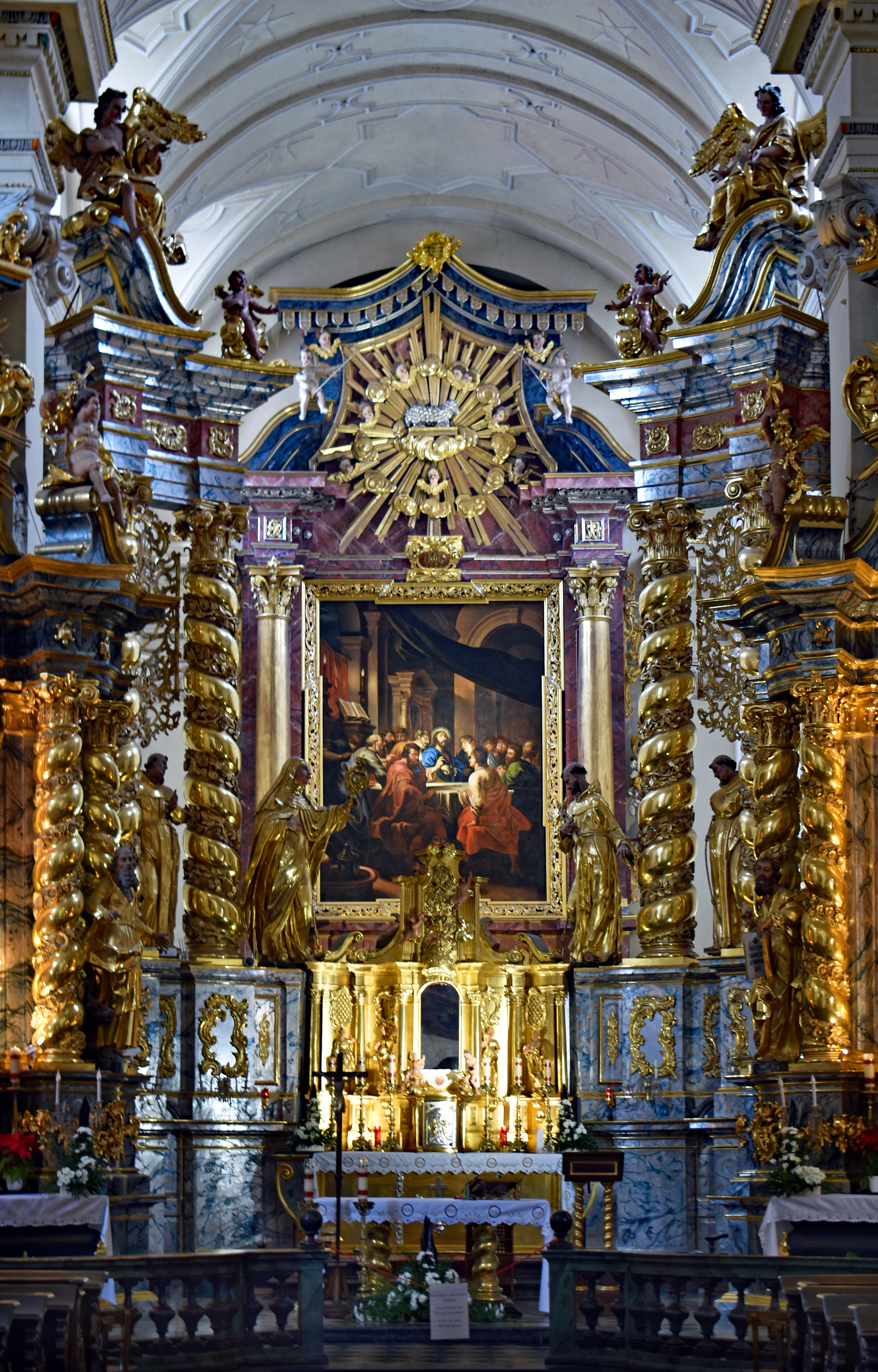
Main altar

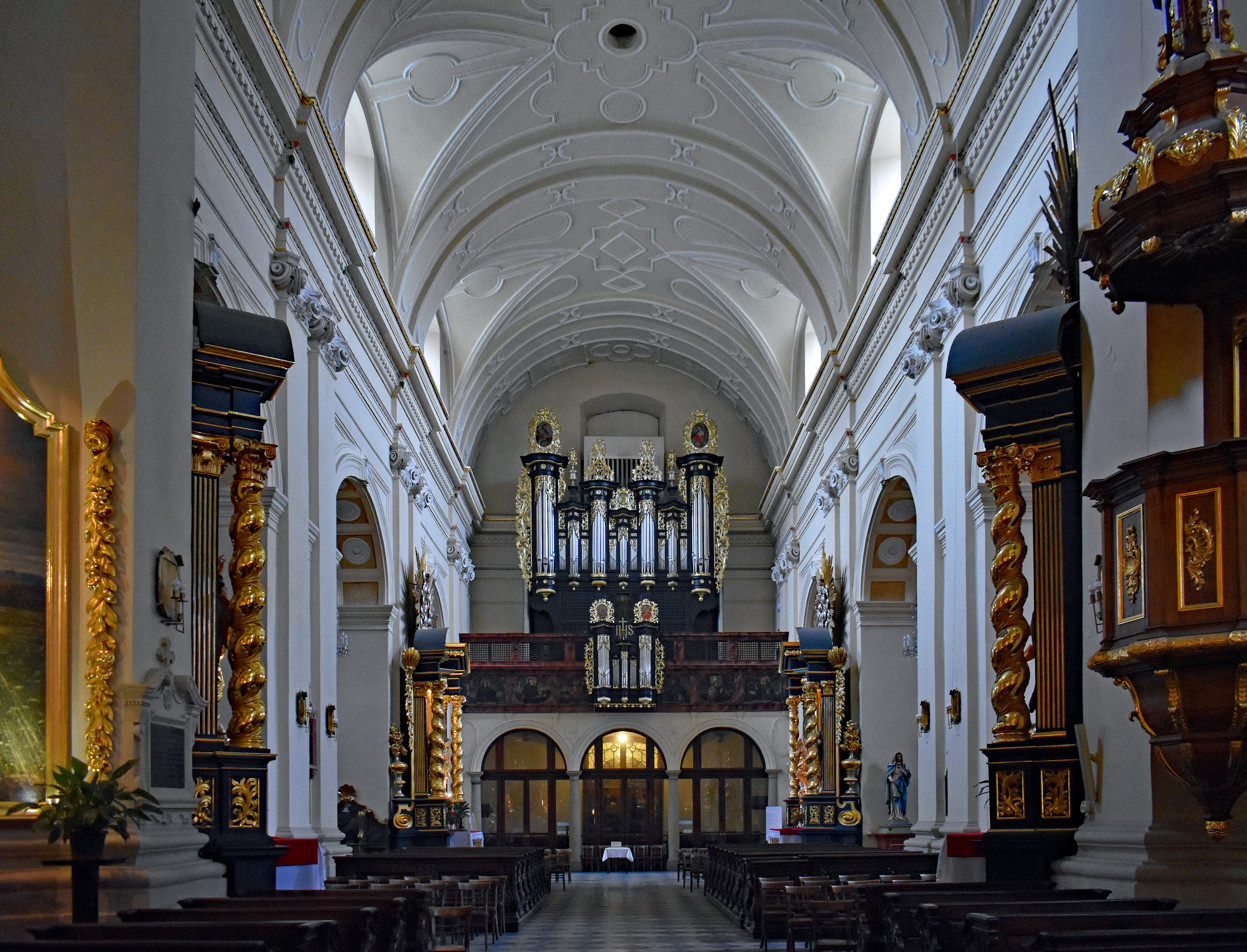
Choir and organ

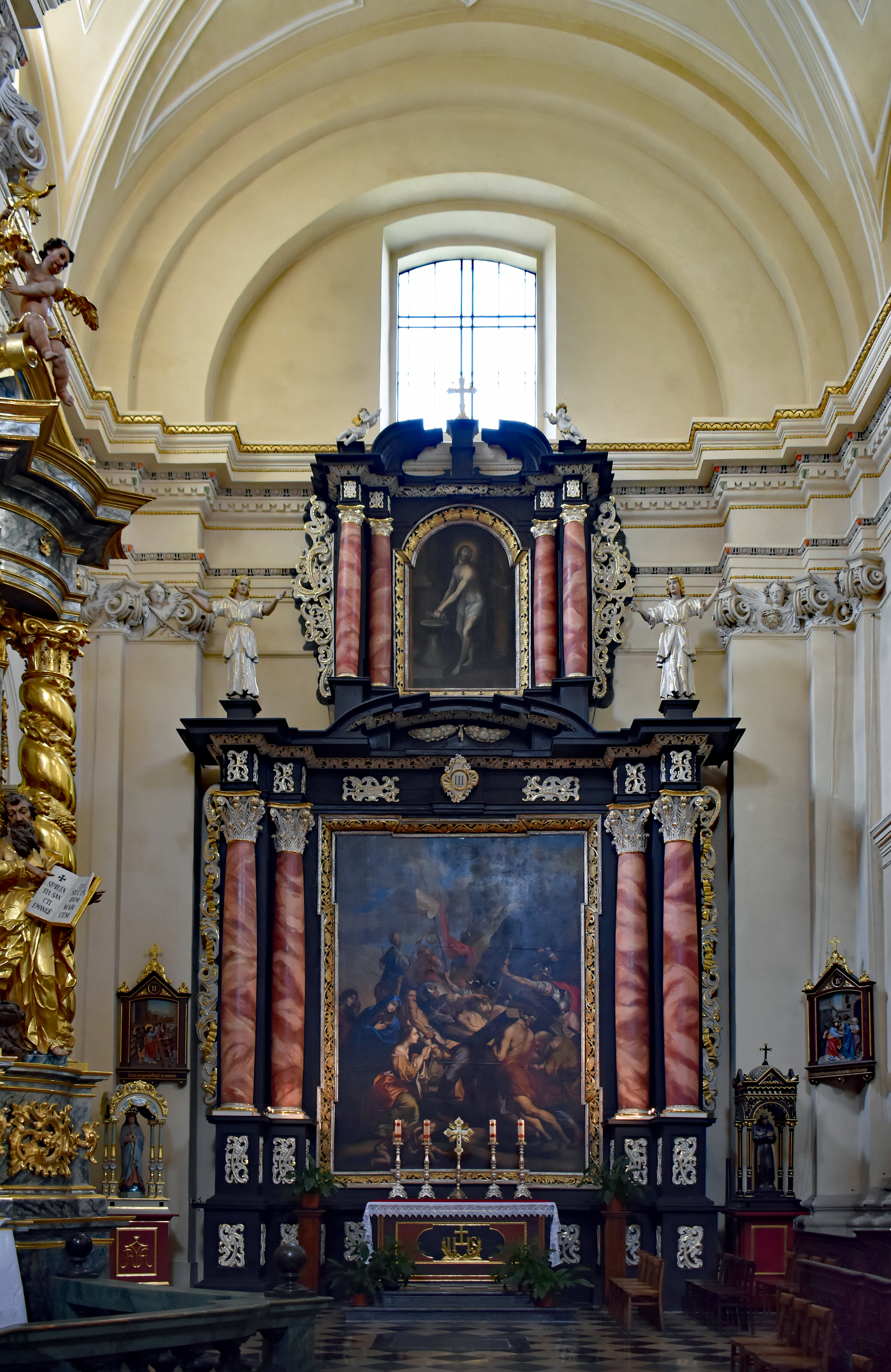
Right arm of the transept with an altar painting by Franciszek Lekszycki (“The First Fall under the Cross”)

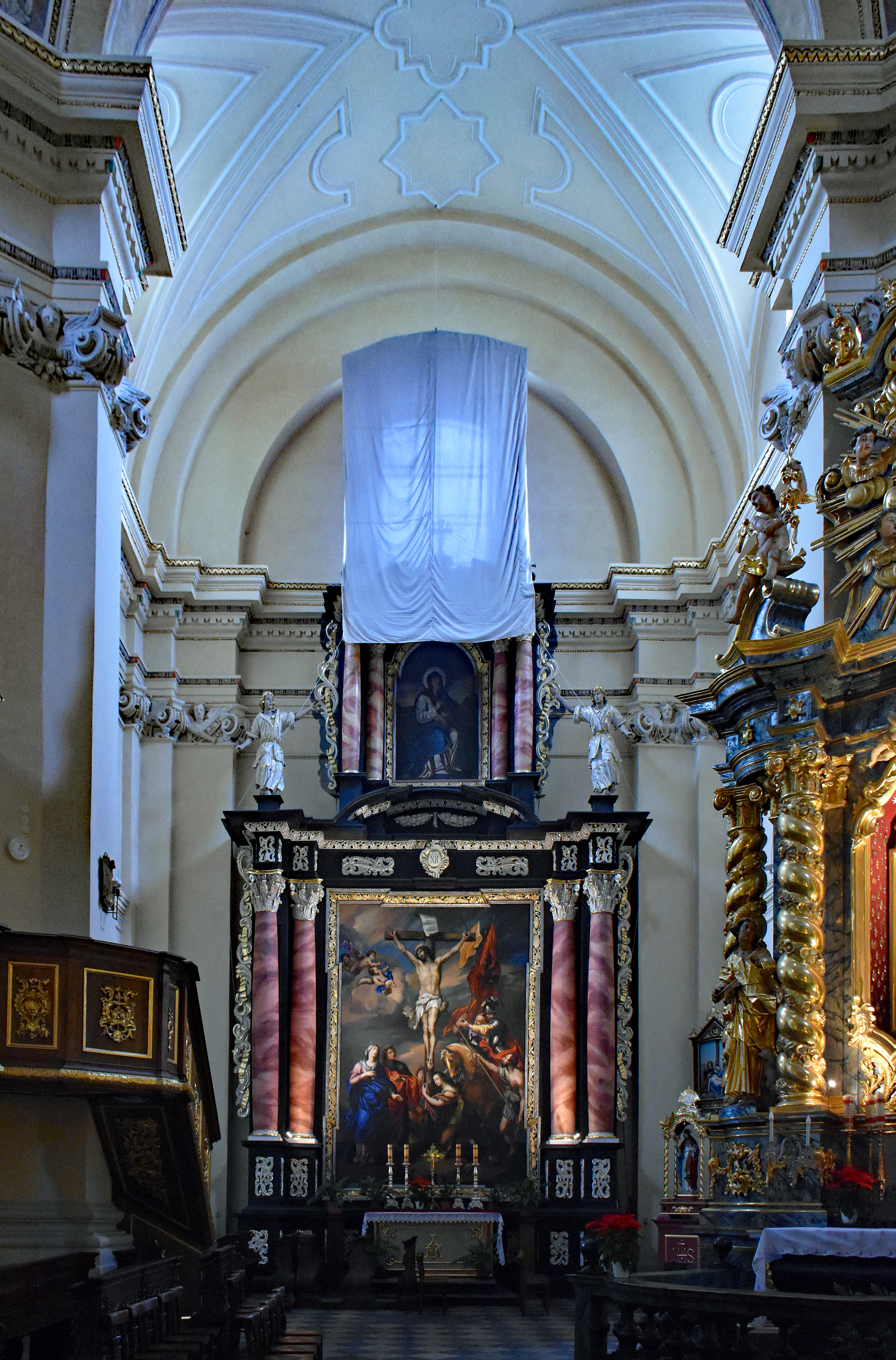
Left arm of the transept with Lekszycki's “Crucifixion”

== Bibliography ==
- Dwornik-Gutowska, Ewa; Małkiewiczówna, Helena (1987). "Kościół p.w. św. Bernardyna ze Sieny i klasztor bernardynów". Katalog Zabytków Sztuki w Polsce. IV (4). Warsaw: 7–43.
- Rusecki, Innocenty Marek (2003). "Z dziejów ojców bernardynów w Polsce 1453-2003". Łódzkie Studia Teologiczne. 11–12.
- Wowczak, Jerzy (2017). Jan Sas-Zubrzycki. Towarzystwo Wydawnicze Historia Iagellonika. ISBN 978-83-65080-63-9.
- (in Polish) * Michał Rożek, Barbara Gądkowa Leksykon kościołów Krakowa, Wydawnictwo Verso, Kraków 2003, ISBN 83-919281-0-1 pp. 27-29 (Lexicon of Kraków churches)
- (in Polish) * Praca zbiorowa Encyklopedia Krakowa, wydawca Biblioteka Kraków i Muzeum Krakowa, Kraków 2023, ISBN 978-83-66253-46-9 volume I pp. 741-742 (Encyclopedia of Kraków)
