= Confess (disambiguation) =

To confess is to admit one's guilt or to admit one's belief.

Confess may also refer to:

- Confess (TV series), an American drama television series
- Confess (film), a 2005 thriller film
- "Confess" (song), a 1948 vocal duet
- Confess (album), an album by Twin Shadow
- Confess (band), an Iranian metal band
- Confess, the autobiography of Judas Priest frontman Rob Halford

== See also ==
- Confession (disambiguation)
