= Confession (disambiguation) =

A confession is an acknowledgement of fact by one who would have otherwise preferred to keep that fact hidden.

Confession may also refer to:

== Law ==
- Confession (law), a statement by a suspect in crime which is adverse to that person

== Religion ==
- Confession (religion), the acknowledgment of one's sinfulness or wrongdoings
  - Confession (Judaism)
  - Confession (Lutheran Church)
  - Sacrament of Penance, during which Catholics confess their sins
- Creed, also known as a confession of faith
- Confessionalism (religion), assent to the whole of a movement's or denomination's teachings
- Confessing Movement, conservative Christian movement within mainline Protestant churches
- Confessio, Saint Patrick § Confessio, a declaration written by Saint Patrick as a defence against detractors

== Arts, entertainment, and media ==
=== Films ===
- The Confession (1920 film), an American film directed by Bertram Bracken
- Confession (1929 film), an American film directed by Lionel Barrymore
- Confession (1937 film), an American remake of the 1935 German film Mazurka
- Confession (1955 film), a British film by Ken Hughes
- The Confession (1964 film), a film by William Dieterle
- The Confession (1970 film), a French-Italian film by Costa-Gavras
- The Confession (1999 film), an American drama starring Ben Kingsley
- The Confession (2002 film), a Turkish drama
- The Confession (2010 film), a British short film by Tanel Toom
- Confession (2014 film), a South Korean film starring Ji Sung
- Confession (2015 film), a South Korean film starring Kim Young-ho
- The Confession (2013 film), a Hallmark Channel TV movie
- Confession (2022 film), a South Korean mystery thriller film
- Confession (2026 film), an American historical drama

=== Literature ===
- "Confession", a 12th-century Latin poem attributed to the Archpoet
- Confession (Bakunin), an 1851 autobiographical work by Mikhail Bakunin
- Confession (Leo Tolstoy), an 1882 short work on religion by Leo Tolstoy
- A Confession (Gorky), a 1908 novel by Maxim Gorky
- The Confession (novel), a 2010 novel by John Grisham
- The Confession, a 2004 novel by Olen Steinhauer

=== Music ===
==== Bands ====
- Confession (band), an Australian hardcore/metalcore band
- The Confession (band), an American heavy metal music group

==== Albums ====
- Confession (Ill Niño album), 2003
- Confession (Pets Tseng album), 2019

==== Songs ====
- "Confession" (Florida Georgia Line song), 2015
- "Confession" (Louise song), 2025
- "Confession", by Coldrain from The Enemy Inside
- "Confession", by Collective Soul from See What You Started by Continuing
- "Confession", by Gary Numan from Outland
- "Confession", by Lagwagon from Double Plaidinum
- "Confession", by Samantha Fox from I Wanna Have Some Fun
- "Confession", by Toby Fox, a track from the soundtrack of the 2015 video game Undertale
- "Confession", by Uriah Heep from High and Mighty
- "Confession", by MacKenzie Porter from Nobody's Born with a Broken Heart
- "Confession I", and "Confession II", by Shinhwa from Winter Story
- "The Confession", by Laura Nyro from Eli and the Thirteenth Confession

=== Television/web series ===
==== Series ====
- Confession (American TV series), a 1958–1959 American television series
- Confession (South Korean TV series), a 2019 South Korean television series
- Confession (miniseries), a 1998 Russian documentary miniseries
- A Confession (TV series), a 2019 British television series
- The Confession (TV series), a 2011 web-series produced by and starring Kiefer Sutherland

==== Episodes ====
- "Confession" (Death Note episode), an episode of Death Note
- "Confession" (Law & Order), a 1991 episode of Law & Order
- "The Confession" (Alias), an episode of Alias
- "The Confession" (House), a 2011 episode of House
- "The Confession" (The Borgias), second-season finale episode of the historical drama The Borgias
- The Confession (Friday Night Lights), an episode of the TV series Friday Night Lights
- Confession (Playhouse 90), an American television play

=== Other arts, entertainment, and media ===
- Confession (radio program), a 1953 summer replacement program for Dragnet on NBC
- Confession album or confession book, a kind of formulaic autograph book

== See also ==
- Absolution (disambiguation)
- Confess (disambiguation)
- Confessions (disambiguation)
- Confessor (disambiguation)
- Declaration of love
