= George the Confessor =

Saint George the Confessor
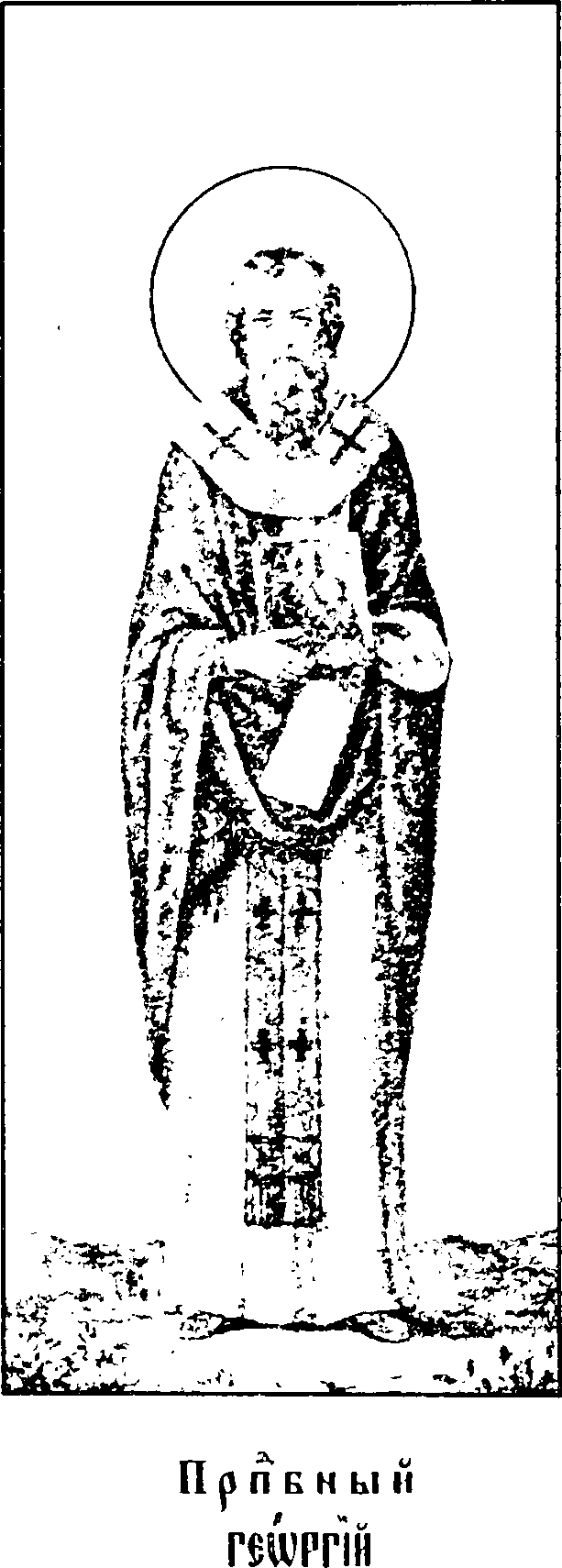

Bishop of Antioch in Pisidia
- Died: 814
- Venerated in: Eastern Orthodox Church; Roman Catholic Church
- Feast: 19 April

Saint George the Confessor (Greek: Ἅγιος Γεώργιος ὁ Ὁμολογητής), also known as Saint George of Antioch, was the Bishop of Antioch in Pisidia in the 8th century. He is venerated as a saint in the Eastern Orthodox Church and Roman Catholic Church, and his feast day is 19 April.

== Biography ==
In his youth, George became a monk and gained renown for his piety, and was later ordained bishop of Antioch in Pisidia. In 754, George attended the iconoclast Council of Hieria in Constantinople, which banned the veneration of icons. However, as an iconodule, George refused to comply with the rulings of the council and was subsequently exiled by Emperor Constantine V. He later returned from exile and attended the restoration of the veneration of icons at the Second Council of Nicaea in 787.

George criticised the restoration of iconoclasm at the onset of the reign of Emperor Leo V, and once more refused to remove icons from churches within his diocese. The emperor banished George, who died in exile in 814. For his dedication to the Orthodox Church, George was named a Confessor of the Faith.

== Bibliography ==
- Watkins, Basil (2015). The Book of Saints: A Comprehensive Biographical Dictionary. Bloomsbury Publishing.
