= Le Plessis-Belleville =

- Commune
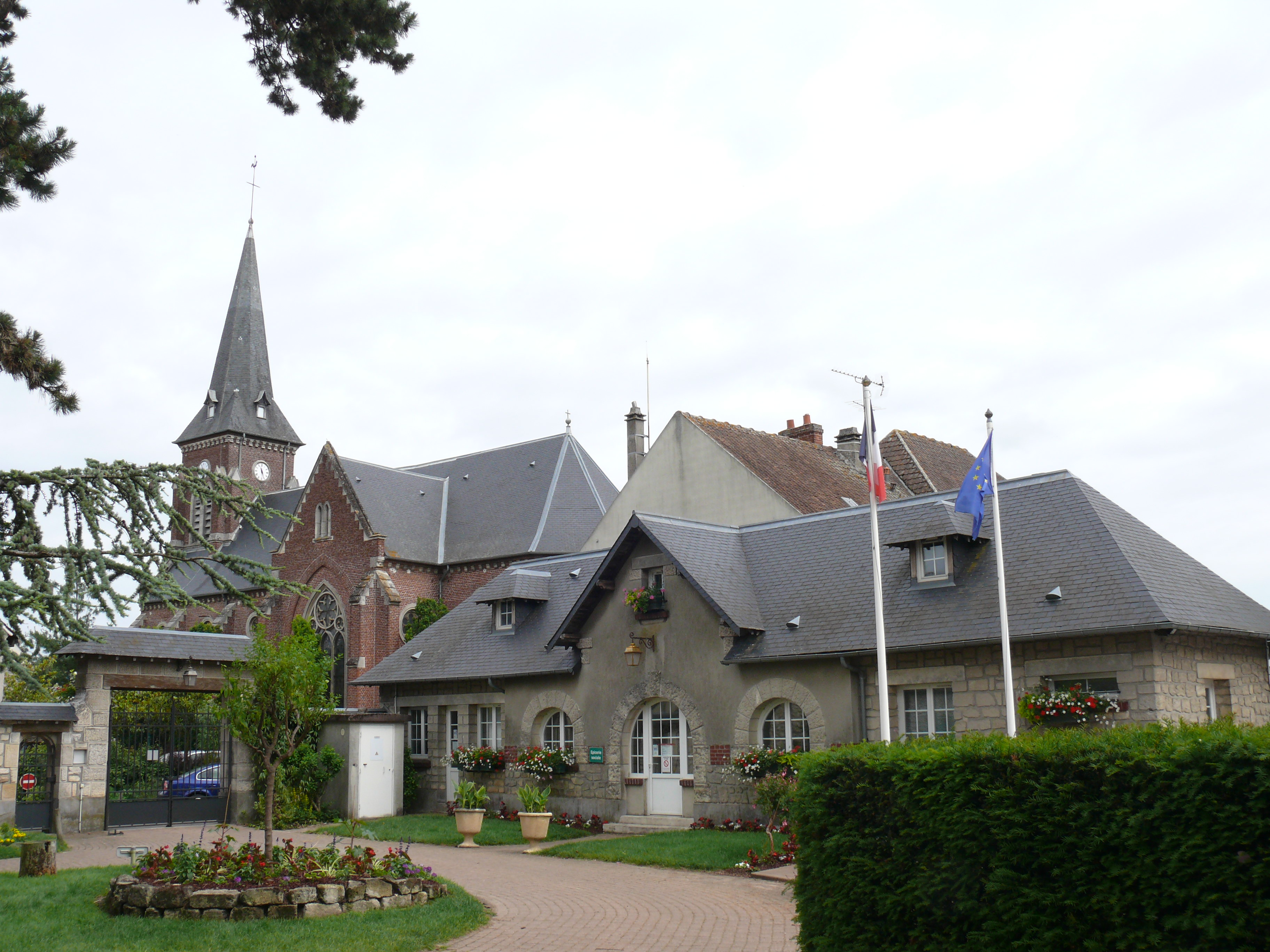
- The town hall in Le Plessis-Belleville

- Coat of arms
- Location of Le Plessis-Belleville
- Location within France Location within Hauts-de-France
- Coordinates: 49°05′51″N 2°45′14″E
- Country: France
- Region: Hauts-de-France
- Department: Oise
- Arrondissement: Senlis
- Canton: Nanteuil-le-Haudouin
- Intercommunality: Pays de Valois

Government
  - Mayor (2020–2026): Domminique Smaguine
- Area^{1}: 6.86 km^{2} (2.65 sq mi)
- Elevation: 115 m (377 ft)
- Highest elevation: 122 m (400 ft)
- Lowest elevation: 94 m (308 ft)
- Population (2023): 4,009
  - Density: 584/km^{2} (1,510/sq mi)
- Time zone: UTC+01:00 (CET)
  - Summer (DST): UTC+02:00 (CEST)
- INSEE/Postal code: 60500 /60330
- ^{1} French Land Register data, which excludes lakes, ponds, glaciers > 1 km^{2} (0.386 sq mi or 247 acres) and river estuaries.

Le Plessis-Belleville (French pronunciation: [lə plɛsi bɛlvil]) is a commune in the Oise department in northern France.

== Climate ==
On average, Le Plessis-Belleville experiences 44.5 days per year with a minimum temperature below 0 °C (32.0 °F), 0.8 days per year with a minimum temperature below −10 °C (14.0 °F), 5.3 days per year with a maximum temperature below 0 °C (32.0 °F), and 12.4 days per year with a maximum temperature above 30 °C (86.0 °F). The record high temperature was 42.2 °C (108.0 °F) on July 25, 2019, while the record low temperature was −14.1 °C (6.6 °F) on January 10, 2009.

Climate data for Le Plessis-Belleville (1991–2020 normals, extremes 2003–present)
| Month | Jan | Feb | Mar | Apr | May | Jun | Jul | Aug | Sep | Oct | Nov | Dec | Year |
|---|---|---|---|---|---|---|---|---|---|---|---|---|---|
| Record high °C (°F) | 15.5 (59.9) | 19.4 (66.9) | 23.8 (74.8) | 29.1 (84.4) | 32.0 (89.6) | 35.8 (96.4) | 42.2 (108.0) | 40.1 (104.2) | 34.9 (94.8) | 28.3 (82.9) | 21.7 (71.1) | 16.6 (61.9) | 42.2 (108.0) |
| Mean daily maximum °C (°F) | 6.4 (43.5) | 8.0 (46.4) | 11.5 (52.7) | 16.4 (61.5) | 19.0 (66.2) | 23.0 (73.4) | 25.8 (78.4) | 24.9 (76.8) | 21.5 (70.7) | 16.2 (61.2) | 10.6 (51.1) | 7.0 (44.6) | 15.9 (60.5) |
| Daily mean °C (°F) | 4.0 (39.2) | 5.0 (41.0) | 7.3 (45.1) | 10.8 (51.4) | 13.7 (56.7) | 17.3 (63.1) | 19.5 (67.1) | 18.9 (66.0) | 15.9 (60.6) | 12.2 (54.0) | 7.8 (46.0) | 4.6 (40.3) | 11.4 (52.5) |
| Mean daily minimum °C (°F) | 1.6 (34.9) | 1.9 (35.4) | 3.0 (37.4) | 5.3 (41.5) | 8.4 (47.1) | 11.5 (52.7) | 13.1 (55.6) | 12.9 (55.2) | 10.3 (50.5) | 8.2 (46.8) | 4.9 (40.8) | 2.2 (36.0) | 6.9 (44.5) |
| Record low °C (°F) | −14.1 (6.6) | −11.9 (10.6) | −11.2 (11.8) | −3.9 (25.0) | −0.7 (30.7) | 2.9 (37.2) | 3.8 (38.8) | 5.1 (41.2) | −0.3 (31.5) | −5.7 (21.7) | −5.7 (21.7) | −8.7 (16.3) | −14.1 (6.6) |
| Average precipitation mm (inches) | 56.2 (2.21) | 49.8 (1.96) | 48.8 (1.92) | 36.2 (1.43) | 74.2 (2.92) | 63.4 (2.50) | 53.2 (2.09) | 60.3 (2.37) | 46.0 (1.81) | 53.5 (2.11) | 52.6 (2.07) | 67.5 (2.66) | 661.7 (26.05) |
| Average precipitation days (≥ 1.0 mm) | 11.0 | 9.7 | 9.8 | 7.7 | 10.1 | 9.2 | 8.0 | 9.4 | 6.6 | 9.9 | 10.3 | 12.4 | 114.1 |
Source: Meteociel

== Population ==
Historical population
| Year | Pop. | ±% p.a. |
|---|---|---|
| 1968 | 1,177 | — |
| 1975 | 1,474 | +3.27% |
| 1982 | 1,816 | +3.03% |
| 1990 | 2,580 | +4.49% |
| 1999 | 2,806 | +0.94% |
| 2007 | 3,090 | +1.21% |
| 2012 | 3,303 | +1.34% |
| 2017 | 3,408 | +0.63% |
| 2023 | 4,009 | +2.74% |
Source: INSEE

== See also ==
- Communes of the Oise department
