= My Confession (Nikolai Karamzin) =

Russian literary work

- Author: Nikolai Karamzin
- Original title: Моя исповедь
- Language: Russian
- Genre: Short story (povest')
- Publisher: Vestnik Yevropy
- Publication date: 1802
- Publication place: Moscow, Russian Empire
- Media type: Print

Moya ispoved' (Russian: Моя исповедь), English translation: My Confession is a short story (povest') by the Russian writer Nikolai Karamzin (1766–1826). It was first published in 1802 in the journal Vestnik Yevropy (Вестник Европы; "The European Messenger") (Part 2, No. 6) under the signature "Count N. N."

== Plot ==
The story is written in the first person. The protagonist is a "Count N. N.", who, in "a letter to an editor of a journal", openly reports on his life. He is portrayed as a cynic and egoist, considering himself an exceptional person; he writes his confession merely out of obedience to fashionable trends.

About a sojourn in the German city Leipzig for example, he writes:

Приехав в Лейпциг, мы спешили познакомиться со всеми славными профессорами — и нимфами. Гофмейстер мой имел великое уважение к первым и маленькую слабость к последним. Я взял его себе за образец — и мы одним давали обеды, другим — ужины.

(roughly translated) Having arrived in Leipzig, we hastened to make the acquaintance of all the illustrious professors — and nymphs. My tutor held great respect for the former and a slight weakness for the latter. I took him as my model — and to the one we gave dinners, to the others — suppers.

== Themes and analysis ==
Literary scholars interpret My Confession as a satire and a polemic against Jean-Jacques Rousseau, author of the influential Confessions of the late 18th and early 19th centuries. Karamzin challenges Rousseau's educational theories and questions the notion of humanity's inherent goodness. The narrative also contains elements of self-parody.

My Confession significantly influenced the development of 19th-century Russian literature, with its enduring tendency toward confessional writing. It marks the beginnings of reflection and self-analysis, later exemplified in Mikhail Lermontov's A Hero of Our Time.

According to the Slavicist Ulrike Brinkjost, Karamzin parodies in the povest' the sentimentalist genre (as also in his Rycar' našego vremeni / Рыцарь нашего времени). He exposes in it

die Konventionalität sentimentalistischer Themen, Figurenkonstellationen und Motive [...] und stellt durch eine alle Werte und Wertigkeiten des Sentimentalismus in ihr Gegenteil verkehrende Verfremdung Hypertrophien und automatisierte Verfahren des Genres bloß

the conventionality of sentimentalist themes, character constellations, and motifs, and—through an estrangement that reverses all the values and hierarchies of sentimentalism—reveals the hypertrophies and automated procedures of the genre.

== See also ==
- Vestnik Yevropy (1802-1830) (Russian)
- Rycar' našego vremeni (Russian)
- Letters of a Russian Traveler (Russian)

== Bibliography ==
- "My confession; a letter to an editor of a journal", in: Selected Prose of N. M. Karamzin. Evanston: Northwestern University Press, 1969
- Ulrike Brinkjost: Geschichte und Geschichten: Ästhetischer und histographischer Diskurs bei N. M. Karamzin. (Slavistische Beiträge, Band 390), Sagner, München 2000
