= Confessions =

Confessions are acknowledgements of facts by those who would have otherwise preferred to keep those facts hidden.

Confessions may also refer to:

== Film, television, and radio ==
- Confessions (1925 film), a British silent film
- Confessions (2010 film), a Japanese film
- The Confessions (film) (Le confessioni), a 2016 Italian film
- Confessions series, a 1970s series of film adaptations of novels by Christopher Wood
- "Confessions" (Arrow), a 2019 television episode
- "Confessions" (Breaking Bad), a 2013 television episode
- "Confessions" (Roseanne), a 1990 television episode
- Confessions (radio programme), a British radio feature presented by Simon Mayo

== Literature ==
- Confessions (Augustine), a 4th-century autobiographical work by St. Augustine of Hippo
- Confession (Bakunin), an 1851 autobiographical work by Mikhail Bakunin
- Confessions (Rousseau), a 1782–1789 autobiography by Jean-Jacques Rousseau
- Confessions series, a 1970s series of novels by Christopher Wood, and their film adaptations
- Confessions (Minato novel), a 2008 novel by Kanae Minato and translated by Stephen Snyder

== Music ==
- Confessions, a 2008 song cycle by Teitur Lassen and Nico Muhly
- Confessions Tour, a 2006 concert tour by Madonna

=== Albums ===
- Confessions (Alesana album), 2015
- Confessions (Buckcherry album), 2013
- Confessions (Liza Minnelli album), 2010
- Confessions (Louise album), 2025
- Confessions (Pillar album), 2009
- Confessions (Usher album), 2004
- Confessions, by Aurea, 2018
- Confessions, by Dweezil Zappa, 1991
- Confessions, by Mary's Blood, 2019
- Confessions, an EP by Escape the Day, 2014

=== Songs ===
- "Confessions" (song), by Lecrae, 2012
- "Confessions Part II", by Usher, 2004
- "Confessions", by Cubsport from Like Nirvana, 2020
- "Confessions", by Destiny's Child from The Writing's on the Wall, 1999
- "Confessions", by tha Mexakinz from Tha Mexakinz, 1996
- "Confessions", by Mötley Crüe from Generation Swine, 1997
- "Confessions", by Slipknot from Mate. Feed. Kill. Repeat., 1996
- "Confessions", by the Stray Dags, 1981
- Confessions", a 2025 song by Flo Rida

== See also ==
- Confessions on a Dance Floor, a 2005 album by Madonna
- Confessions II, a 2026 album by Madonna
- Confession (disambiguation)
