= Bernardines (Franciscans) =

Bernardines is the historical, traditional name for members of the Polish province of the Order of Friars Minor (Franciscan Observants) established in 1453. The official name is Province of the Immaculate Conception of the Blessed Virgin Mary of the Order of Friars Minor in Poland (Polish: Prowincja Niepokalanego Poczęcia Najświętszej Maryi Panny Zakonu Braci Mniejszych w Polsce).

The Bernardines developed very rapidly in the territories of Poland and Lithuania. At the time of the First Partition in 1772 of the Polish-Lithuanian Commonwealth, there were 129 monasteries on its territory. As a result of rapid growth, the Bernardines split into four separate provinces: Lesser Poland, Greater Poland, Ruthenia, and Lithuania. Most of the monasteries were dissolved during the partitions, and only those located in the Austrian partition survived. The Polish province was rebuilt after World War I.

Currently, the Polish province of the Order of Friars Minor consists of 27 monasteries in Poland, 1 monastery in Austria, 2 in Germany, 2 in Italy, 2 in Argentina, 1 in Ecuador, as well as 3 missionary posts in Congo.

Traditionally, the name Bernardines is also used by members of the Province of the St. Casimir of the Order of Friars Minor in Lithuania, Lithuanian: Mažesniųjų Brolių Ordino Lietuvos Šv. Kazimiero Provincija, reestablished in 1994, and the Province of St. Michael the Archangel of the Order of Friars Minor in Ukraine, Ukrainian: Провінція Св. Архангела Михаїла Ордену Братів Менших в Україні, which was established in 2004, transforming itself from a created-in 1993 custody dependent on the Polish province.

== History ==
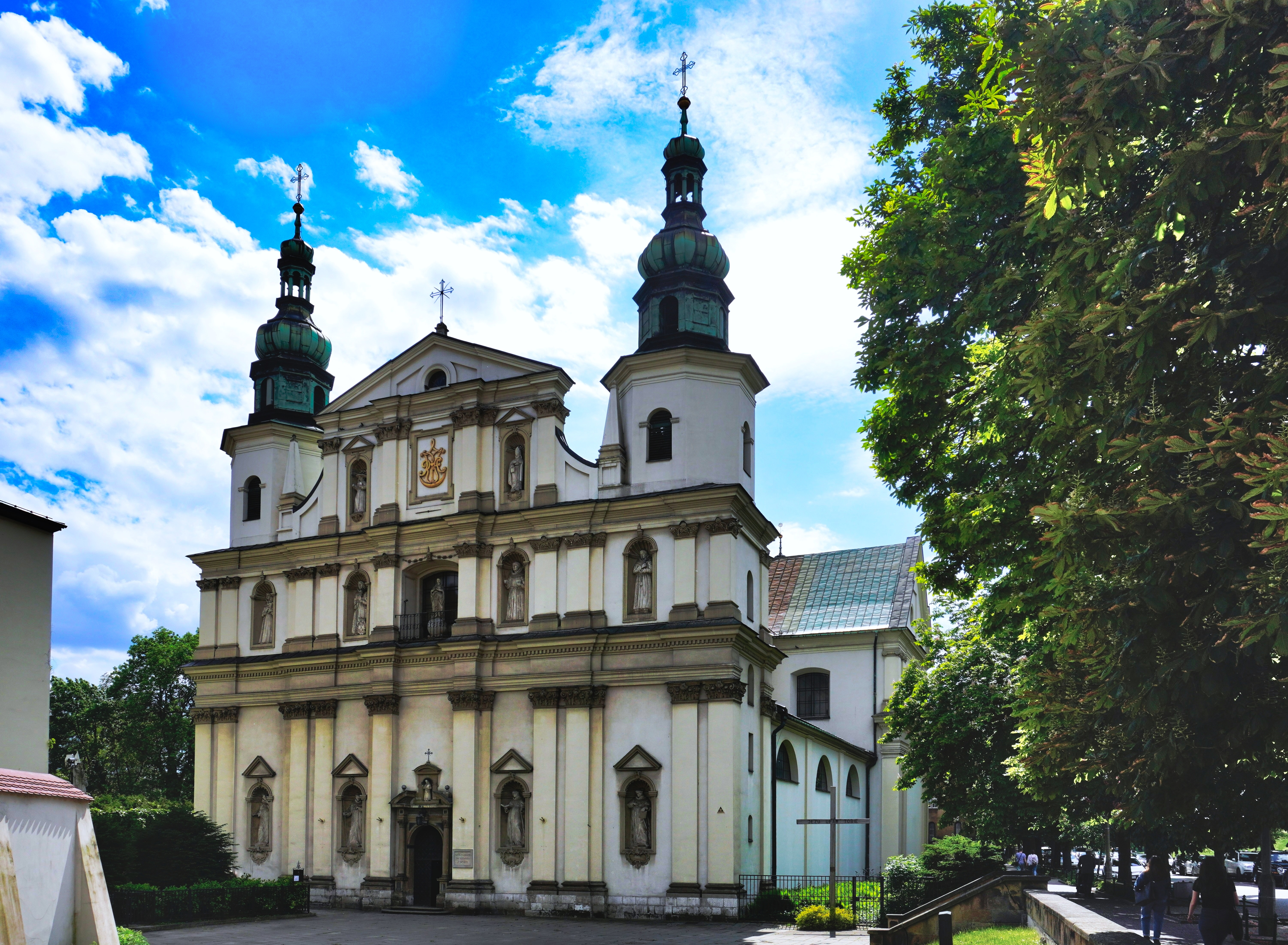
St. Bernardino of Siena monastery in Kraków, established in 1453

The Franciscans arrived in Poland in 1236 and quickly gained extraordinary popularity. Polish friars belonged to the Bohemian-Polish province; three Polish custodies numbered 16 monasteries in 1517. The Observant doctrine appeared in Poland in 1453 with the arrival of John of Capistrano, who delivered many captivating sermons in Kraków, preaching the teachings of his mentor St. Bernardino of Siena.

Under his influence, many students at the University of Kraków wished to live according to the teachings of St. Francis of Assisi, and this led to the establishment of Poland's first Observant monastery in the Stradom district of Kraków, dedicated to St. Bernardino of Siena. John of Capistrano arrived in Kraków on August 28, 1453, and the monastery was founded only 10 days later.

The site for its construction was donated by Cardinal Zbigniew Oleśnicki. It was later enlarged by a royal donation. To distinguish from the already present Franciscan Friars who represented the conventual movement, the Observants came to be called "Bernardines" after the name of the first monastery.

Initially, Polish monasteries belonged to the Austro-Czech-Polish vicariate that was part of the Cismontane congregation, but this was soon divided into three vicariates in 1467. In 1517, the Polish vicariate gained the status of a separate province. From 1518 there were four custodies in Kraków, Poznań, and Vilnius. The Warsaw custody included the Ruthenian convents under its authority.

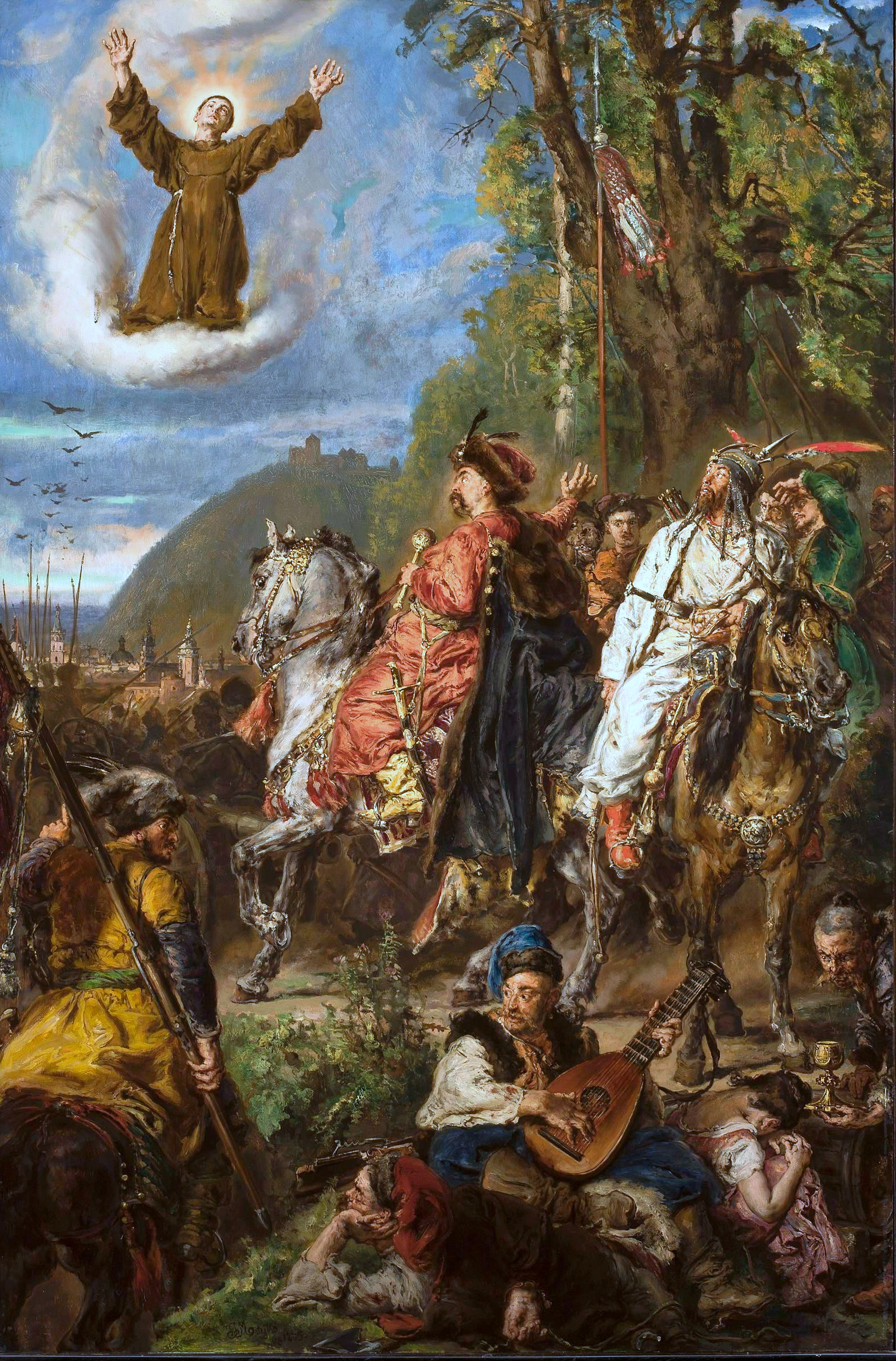
Bohdan Khmelnytsky with Tugay Bey at Lviv, Jan Matejko (1885). According to legend, Khmelnytsky and Tugay Bey withdrew from the siege of Lviv after seeing in the clouds above the Bernardine monastery the figure of a monk kneeling with his hands raised, and frightened by this sight gave the signal to retreat. The Bernardine Friars concluded that it was Blessed Jan of Dukla

In the first period, the order grew rapidly, with several convents established:

- Kraków – 1453
- Warsaw – 1454
- Poznań – 1455
- Wschowa – 1455
- Kościan – 1456
- Kobylin – 1456
- Tarnów – 1459
- Lublin – 1460
- Lviv – 1460
- Kalisz – 1465
- Przeworsk – 1465
- Koło – 1466
- Warta – 1467
- Radom – 1468
- Kaunas – 1468
- Vilnius – 1469
- Łowicz – 1470
- Sambir – 1471
- Tykocin – 1479
- Bydgoszcz – 1480

Development was interrupted by the Reformation, and it was only during the Counter-Reformation period that it resumed. The 1648 Khmelnytsky Uprising and subsequent wars led to the destruction of nine monasteries in Ruthenia and Ukraine. This did not stop the establishment of new congregations. As a result of the rapid growth of the order, on February 20, 1628, the Polish province was divided into four separate provinces: Lesser Poland, Greater Poland, Ruthenia, and Lithuania.

On July 22, 1630, the provinces of Ruthenia, Lesser Poland, and Lithuania were merged into one. In 1637, the Ruthenia province was again separated. In 1731, the province of Lithuania seceded again from the province of Lesser Poland.

In 1765, the province of Greater Poland had 37 monasteries, the province of Lesser Poland 18, the province of Lithuania 34, and the province of Ruthenia 30 monasteries.

During the partition period, almost all monasteries in the territories occupied by Prussia and Russia were liquidated, except for Koło in Greater Poland, Kretinga in Lithuania, and Iziaslav in Ukraine. Only the Galician Province, located in Polish lands captured by Austria, survived almost intact.

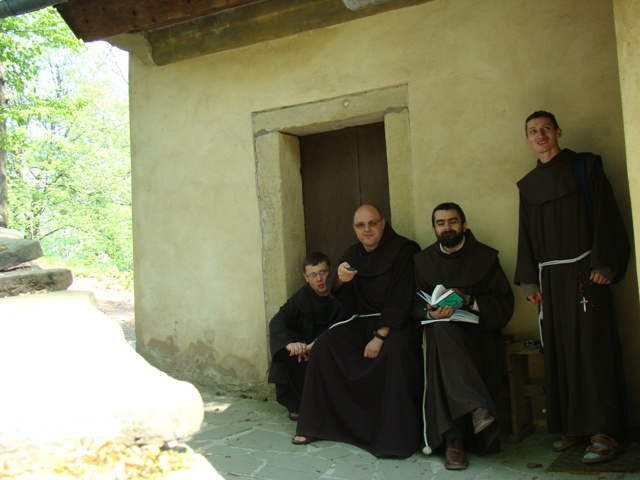
Bernardines friars at the St. Helen's hermitage, Kalwaria Zebrzydowska, 2009

After Poland regained its independence, the order regained some of its monasteries, and also opened new ones in Poland and Japan. Currently, the Polish province of the Order of Friars Minor consists of 27 monasteries in Poland, 1 monastery in Austria, 2 in Germany, 2 in Italy, 2 in Argentina, 1 in Ecuador, as well as 3 missionary posts in Congo.

== See also ==
- Painting of Our Lady of Consolation in Przeworsk

== Bibliography ==
- Rusecki, Innocenty Marek (2003). "Z dziejów ojców bernardynów w Polsce 1453-2003". Łódzkie Studia Teologiczne. 11–12.
