= Confessions (Rousseau) =

1782 autobiographical book by Jean-Jacques Rousseau

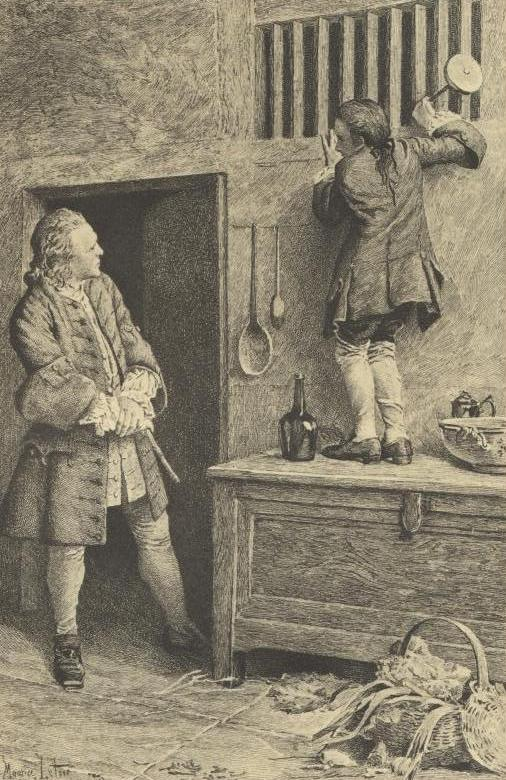
- "The Stealing of The Apple" Aldus edition, 1903
- Author: Jean-Jacques Rousseau
- Original title: Les Confessions
- Language: French
- Genre: Autobiography
- Publisher: Launette; Aux Deux-Ponts: Chez Sanson Et Compagnie
- Publication date: 1782–1789
- Publication place: Switzerland
- English publication date: 1790
- Media type: Print: hardback duodecimo
- OCLC: 14003975
- Dewey Decimal: 848.509
- LC Class: PQ2036 .A5
- Original text: Les Confessions at French Wikisource
- Translation: Confessions at Wikisource

The Confessions is an autobiographical book by Jean-Jacques Rousseau. In the modern era, it is often published with the title The Confessions of Jean-Jacques Rousseau in order to distinguish it from Saint Augustine's Confessions. Covering the first fifty-three years of Rousseau's life, up to 1765, it was completed in 1769, but not published until 1782, four years after Rousseau's death, even though Rousseau did read excerpts of his manuscript publicly at various salons and other meeting places.

== Background and contents ==
The Confessions was two distinct works, each part consisting of six books. Books I to VI were written between 1765 and 1767 and published in 1782, while books VII to XII were written in 1769–1770 and published in 1789. Rousseau alludes to a planned third part, but it was never completed. Though the book contains factual inaccuracies – in particular, Rousseau's dates are frequently off, some events are out of order, and others are misrepresented, incomplete, or incorrect – Rousseau provides an account of the experiences that shaped his personality and ideas. For instance, some parts of his own education are clearly present in his account of ideal education, Emile, or On Education.

Rousseau's work is notable as one of the first major autobiographies. Prior to the Confessions, the two great autobiographies were Augustine's own Confessions and Saint Teresa's Life of Herself. However, both of these works focused on the religious experiences of their authors; the Confessions was one of the first autobiographies in which an individual wrote of his own life mainly in terms of his worldly experiences and personal feelings. Rousseau recognized the unique nature of his work; it opens with the famous words: "I have resolved on an enterprise which has no precedent and which, once complete, will have no imitator. My purpose is to display to my kind a portrait in every way true to nature, and the man I shall portray will be myself." His example was soon followed: not long after publication, many other writers (such as Goethe, Wordsworth, Stendhal, De Quincey, Casanova and Alfieri) wrote their own autobiographies in a similar fashion.

The Confessions is also noted for its detailed account of Rousseau's more humiliating and shameful moments. For instance, Rousseau recounts an incident when, while a servant, he covered up his theft of a ribbon by framing a young girl – who was working in the house – for the crime. In addition, Rousseau explains the manner in which he disposes of the five children he had with Thérèse Levasseur, all of which were abandoned at the foundling hospital.

== Historicity ==
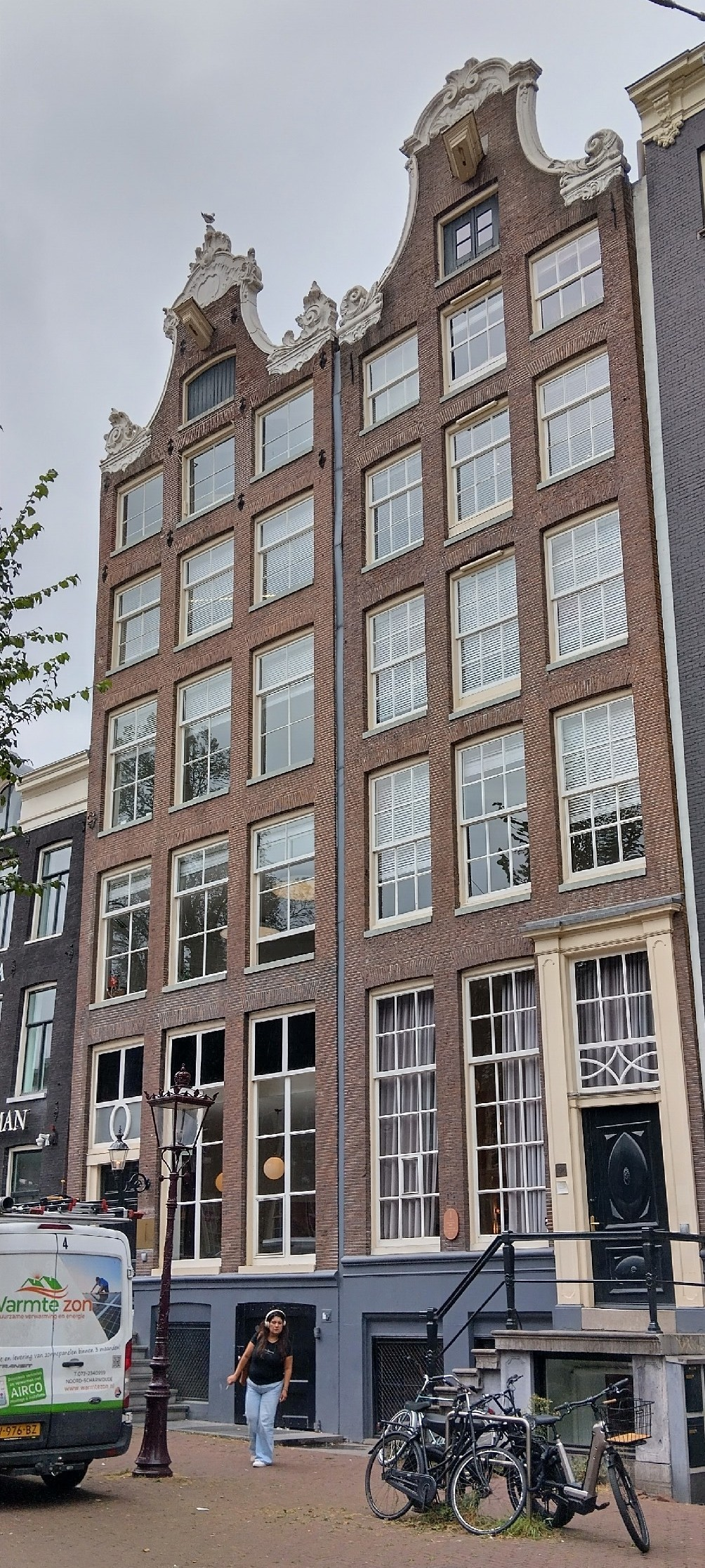
The house on the right NZ Voorburgwal 296, Amsterdam is where his principle publisher and friend Marc-Michel Rey lived and who urged Rousseau to put his memoirs in writing.

According to historian Paul Johnson, Rousseau's autobiography contains many inaccuracies. Will and Ariel Durant have written that the debate regarding the truthfulness of the book hinges on Rousseau's allegation that Grimm and Diderot had connived to give a mendacious description of his relationship with Mme. d'Épinay, Mme. d'Houdetot, and themselves. As stated by Durant, most scholarly opinion prior to 1900 was against Rousseau, but subsequently several scholars including Frederika Macdonald, Pierre-Maurice Masson, Mathew Johnson, Émile Faguet, Jules Lemaître and C. E. Vaughn have reached judgments in favor of Rousseau's veracity.

== See also ==
- My Confession (Nikolai Karamzin)
- Let them eat cake, a saying deriving from this book
- The New Confessions, a novel by William Boyd (1987)

== Bibliography ==
- Damrosch, Leo (2007). Jean-Jacques Rousseau: Restless Genius. Houghton Mifflin Harcourt. ISBN 978-0618872022.
- Johnson, Paul (2009). Intellectuals. HarperCollins. ISBN 978-0-06-187147-4.
