= List of Confessors =

The Confessor (short for Confessor of the Faith) is a title bestowed by some Christian denominations. This is an incomplete list of those so honored.

- Anthony the Confessor (died 844), Eastern Orthodox saint and bishop of Thessaloniki
- Basil the Confessor (died 750), Eastern Orthodox saint and monk
- Chariton the Confessor, 3rd-4th-century saint
- Edward the Confessor (1003/1005–1066), one of the last Anglo-Saxon kings of England, Roman Catholic saint
- Ernest I, Duke of Brunswick-Lüneburg (1497–1546), early champion of the Protestant Reformation
- George the Confessor (died 814), Bishop of Antioch in Pisidia
- George the Standard-Bearer (died 821), Archbishop of Mytilene
- Isaac of Dalmatia (died 383 or 396), Catholic and Orthodox saint, monk and founder of a monastery
- Jacob of Nisibis (died 4th century), Bishop of Nisibis
- Luke Voyno-Yasenetsky (1877–1961), Eastern Orthodox saint and bishop
- Pope Martin I (590/600–655), Catholic and Orthodox saint
- Maximus the Confessor (c. 580–662), Byzantine civil servant, Christian monk, theologian and scholar
- Michael of Synnada (died 826), Catholic and Orthodox saint, bishop of Synnada
- Nicetas of Medikion, (died 824), iconophile monk and Orthodox saint
- Nicetas the Patrician (761/62–836), iconophile monk and Orthodox saint
- Paphnutius of Thebes (died 4th century), bishop and saint
- Paul I of Constantinople (died c. 350), bishop of Constantinople, Roman Catholic and Orthodox saint
- Samuel the Confessor (597–693), Coptic Orthodox saint, founder of a monastery
- Theophanes the Confessor (c. 758/760–817/818), Byzantine aristocrat, monk and chronicler, Roman Catholic and Orthodox saint
