= Gimpel (surname) =

Gimpel is a surname derived from the pet name of the German name Gumprecht.

Notable people with the surname include:

- Bronislav Gimpel (1911–1979), Polish-American violinist
- Erica Gimpel (born 1964), American television actress
- Erich Gimpel (1910–1996), German spy during World War II
- Harald Gimpel, East German slalom canoeist
- Jakob Gimpel (1906–1989), Polish-American pianist
- Jean Gimpel (1918–1996) French historian, medievalist and iconoclast
- Jeremy Gimpel, Israeli educator and politician
- René Gimpel (1881–1945) French art dealer and collector
- Yankev Ber Gimpel (1840–1906), Austro-Hungarian Yiddish theatre figure

== See also ==
- Gimpl
