= Job of Manyava =

Ukrainian Orthodox saint (1550–1621)

Saint Job of Maniava
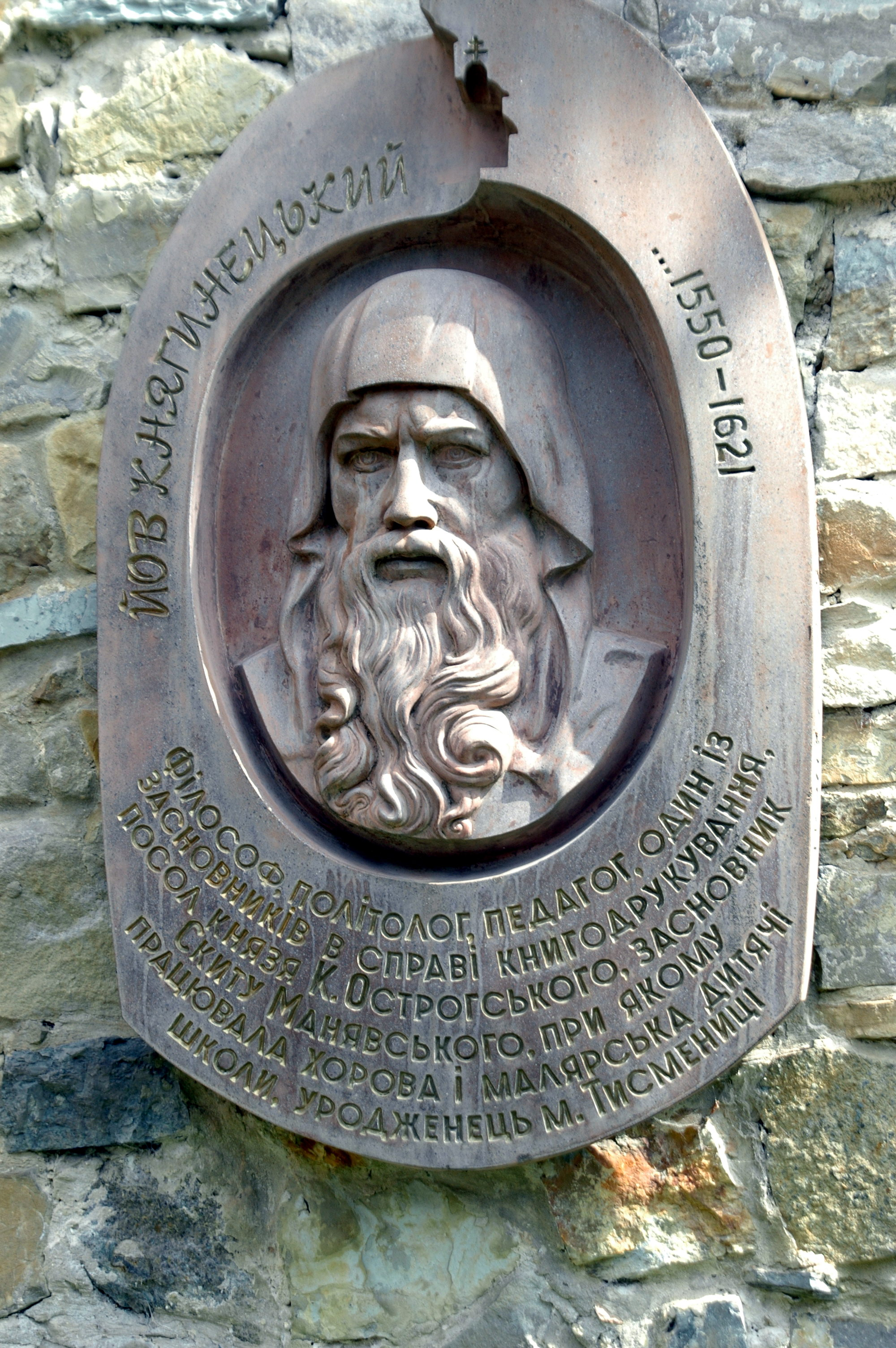

Reverend
- Born: 1550; Tysmenytsia
- Died: December 29, 1621 (aged 70–71); Maniava Skete
- Venerated in: Orthodox Church of Ukraine
- Canonized: 2004 by Ukrainian Orthodox Church - Kyiv Patriarchate
- Feast: 7 July

Job of Maniava, born Ivan Knyahynytskyi (Ukrainian: Княгиницький Йов; 1550, Tysmenytsya, present-day Ukraine - 29 December 1621) and named as a monk Ezekiel, was a Ukrainian Orthodox saint and an Orthodox clerical activist. He was a founder of Manyava Skete, a famous cell monastery in Ukraine.

== Birth and early years ==
Saint Job was born as Ivan Knyahynytskyi in the town of Tysmenytsia (now in Ivano-Frankivsk Oblast, western Ukraine). He was educated at the monastery school in Uhniv (today's Lviv Oblast) and in Ostroh.

For some time he taught at Ostrih School, where he had been invited by nobleman Konstanty Wasyl Ostrogski. In his youth he twice visited Mount Athos in Greece. Once in Ostrih he met a monk from Mount Athos, who made so big impression upon him that he left for Athos and for a long time lived in one of the Athonite monasteries. There, in Greece, he was tonsured a monk with the name Ezekiel in 1584.

== Return to Ukraine (1600) ==
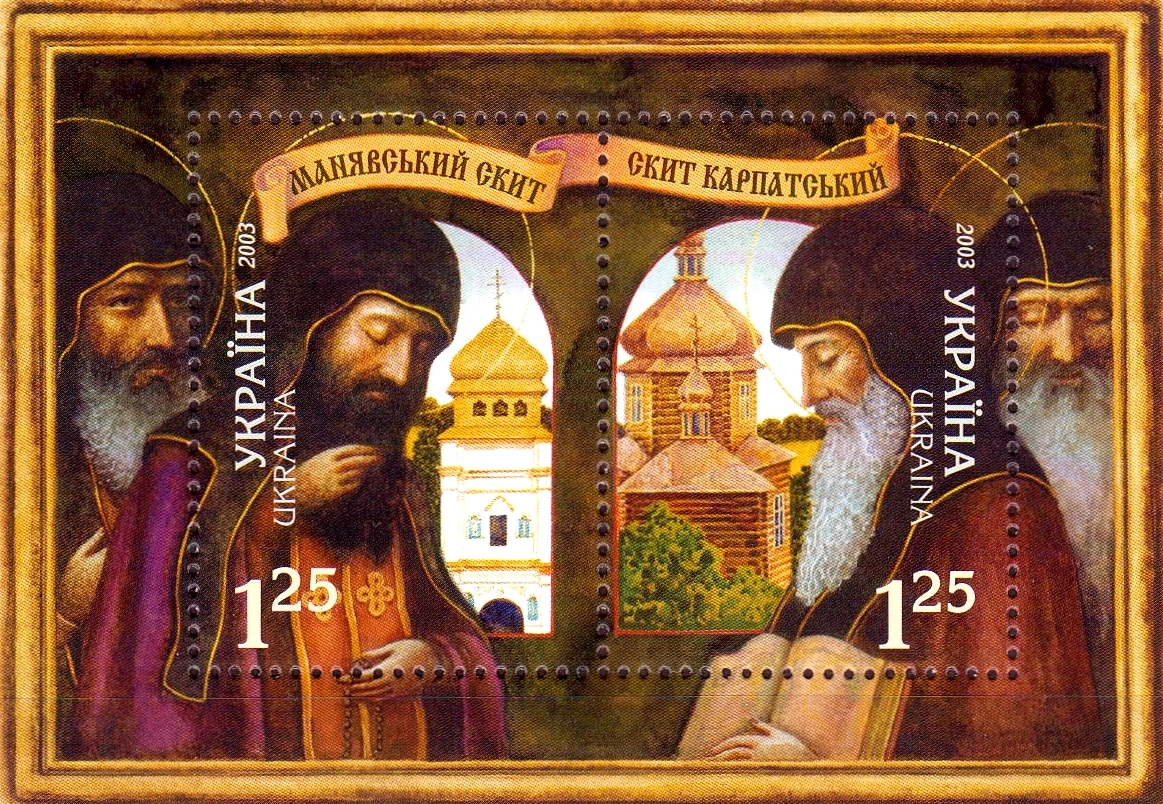
Saint Job and Theodosius of Manyava. Ukrainian postal stamp (2003).

In 1598, the monk Ezekiel, together with other monks from Athos arrived in Ukraine to collect alms. In 1600-1601 he again returned to Ukraine, this time staying to build up the monastic life. After return from Greece, he reorganised a number of Orthodox monasteries in Ukraine. In 1606 blessed Job settled near Krasnopol at the foothills of the Carpathian Mountains. Soon other monks joined him, all seeking spiritual ideals. When numbers had increased, Job, not being a priest, started seeking such a monk who would be able to celebrate the services and liturgies. The lot fell upon deacon Theodosius (Theodosius of Maniava), who was a nephew of Job. After having been consecrated as hieromonk, Theodosius became the first hegumen of Maniava Skyt. When introducing him to the new post, Job said: "Be pastor and teacher of this flock, gathered by God. You are our hieromonk and confessor, you are worthy to be hegumen and I will help you after my strength as long as I live".

In 1611 he founded Maniavskyi Skyt monastery (Skita) near the village of Maniava (today in Ivano-Frankivsk Raion, Ivano-Frankivsk Oblast).

Saint Job of Maniava maintained friendly relations with Ivan Vyshenskyi, Zakhariya Zopystenskyi and other Ukrainian church activists. People turned to Saint Job of Maniava in questions regarding purity of faith (the letter of Cyril Tranquilion is known).

Already a decade after the death of his companion and nephew Saint Theodosius of Maniava, Metropolitan Petro Mohyla of Kyiv wrote: "Go to Pokuttya, to the Skyt, there you will find two hundred angels, who live in bodies..."

The Orthodox monastery of Maniava founded by Job was closed down by Austrian authorities on 1 July 1785. The monastery in Maniava was reestablished with the collapse of communism in Ukraine in the 1990s.

== Canonization and observances ==
Saint Job and Saint Theodosius of Maniava were canonized in 1994 by the Ukrainian Orthodox Church under the Moscow Patriarchate. The Saints were later on canonized at the National Church Council of the Ukrainian Orthodox Church (Kyiv Patriarchate) on 15 July 2004 in Kyiv.

24 June (Church Calendar), which equates to 7 July (civil calendar), is the feast day of Saint Job and Saint Theodosius of Manyava, as celebrated by Ukrainian Orthodox Church.

== See also ==
- Manyava Skete - cell monastery in Ukraine founded by Job of Manyava
- Theodosius of Manyava - successor of Saint Job

== Sources ==
- Hayday L. Istorij Ukrajiny v osobach, terminach, nazvach i poniattiach. Lutsk: Vezha, 2000. (Ukrainian)
- Dovidnyk z istoriji Ukrajiny. Za redakcijeju I. Pidkovy ta R. Shusta. Kyiv: Geneza, 1993. (Ukrainian)
