= Concert Magic =

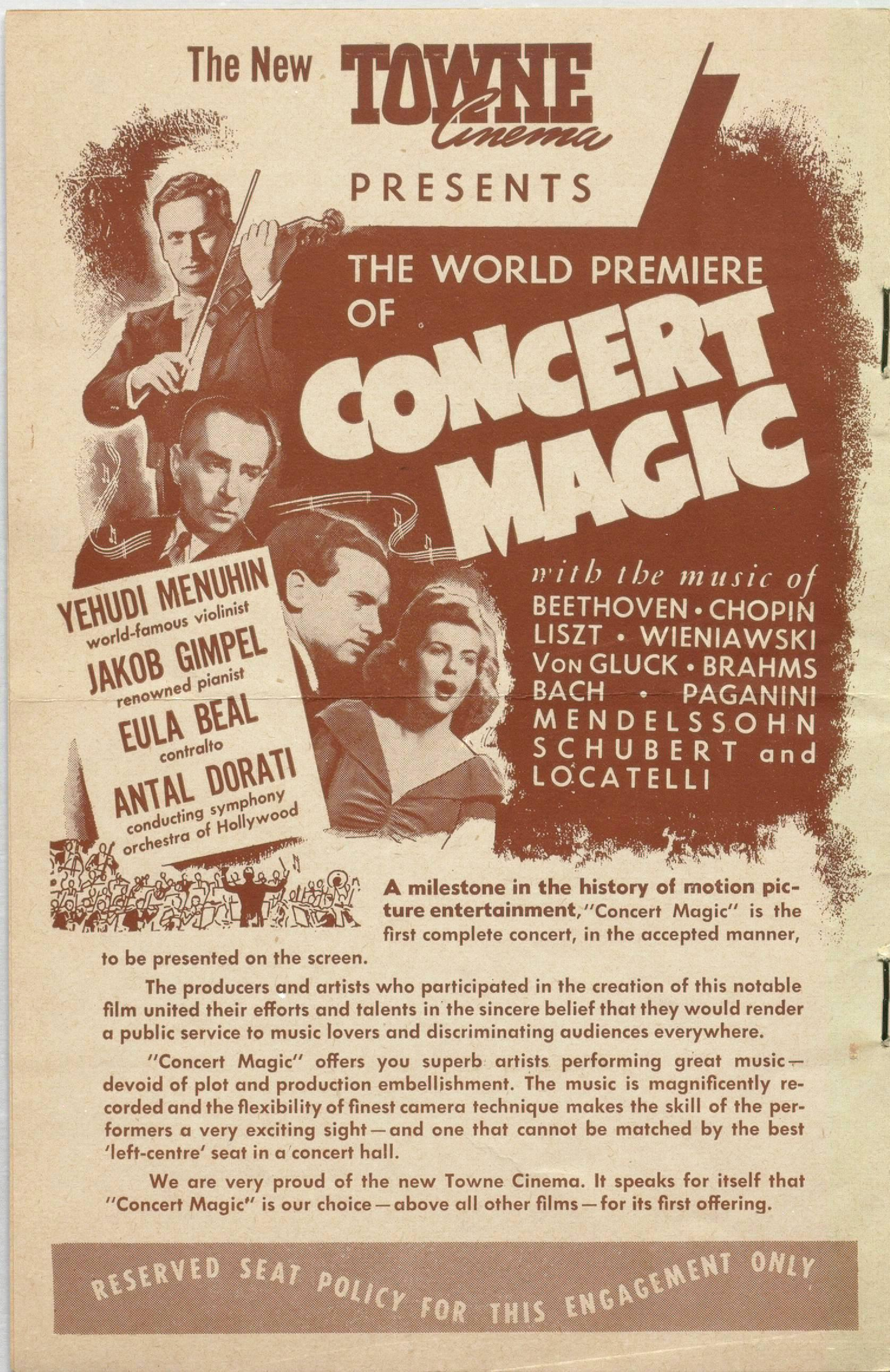
- Directed by: Paul Gordon
- Produced by: Paul Gordon; George Moskov
- Starring: Yehudi Menuhin; Jacob Gimpel; Eula Beal
- Cinematography: Paul Ivano
- Edited by: Douglas Bagier
- Music by: Victor Clement
- Production company: Concert Films Corporation
- Release date: 1948
- Running time: 75 minutes
- Country: United States
- Language: English

Concert Magic is 1948 motion picture which advertises itself as "first complete concert, in the accepted manner, to be presented on the screen". It is one of the earliest concert films.

== Overview ==
The film begins with a written prologue accompanied by narration stressing the importance of music to peoples' lives and the fact that it remains even if empires fall, tyrants rise and are slain, or battles lost. It states that the purpose of this film is to provide the opportunity to present the concert hall experience to people who would otherwise not be so fortunate – the "remote communities of every nation." It is specifically dedicated to music lovers who personal experience of music by distinguished performers is inaccessible.

According to a review in The New York Times published on June 20, 1948, the concert was filmed at Republic Studios but shot to playback at Chaplin Studios. Additionally, a separate "up close" version had been produced for possible television transmission. There was also a performance of one of Felix Mendelssohn's violin concertos that had been filmed but not edited into the final product.

== Compositions and musicians ==
The film is divided into 14 sections each containing a performance of a specific composition.

1. Violin Sonata No. 1 in D Major Op. 12 Allegro con brio by Ludwig van Beethoven

- Violin by Yehudi Menuhin
- Piano by Adolph Baller

2. Praeludium partia for unaccompanied violin #3 by Johann Sebastian Bach

- Violin by Yehudi Menuhin

3.Scherzo Tarantelle by Henryk Wieniawski

- Violin by Yehudi Menuhin
- Piano by Adolph Baller

4.Ave Maria by Charles Gounod, adapted from the first prelude of Johann Sebastian Bach

- Eula Beal – contralto
- Marguerite Campbell – piano

5.Un sospira etude – Franz Liszt

- Jakob Gimpel – piano

6.Mazurkas – Frédéric Chopin

- Jakob Gimpel – piano

7.St Matthew Passion – Johann Sebastian Bach

- Violin by Yehudi Menuhin
- Eula Beal – contralto
- Hollywood Symphony Orchestra, Antal Doráti conducting

8.Perpetual motion Op. 11 – Niccolò Paganini

- Violin by Yehudi Menuhin
- Piano by Adolph Baller

9. Erlkönig – Franz Schubert, German text by Johann Wolfgang von Goethe

- Eula Beal – contralto
- Marguerite Campbell – piano

10.Étude E Major Op. 10 – Frédéric Chopin

- Jakob Gimpel – piano

11. None but the Lonely Heart Op. 6 #6 – Pyotr Ilyich Tchaikovsky

- Eula Beal – contralto
- Marguerite Campbell – piano

12.Labyrinth Number 5 – Pietro Locatelli

- Violin by Yehudi Menuhin
- Piano by Adolph Baller

13.Caprice No. 24 – Niccolò Paganini

- Violin by Yehudi Menuhin
- Piano by Adolph Baller

14.Caprice No. 24 – Niccolò Paganini

- Violin by Yehudi Menuhin
- Piano by Adolph Baller

15.Ave Maria – Franz Schubert

- Violin by Yehudi Menuhin
- Piano by Adolph Baller

== See also ==
- Adventure in Music 1944 – which also claims to be the first concert film.
