= Manyava Skete =

Eastern Orthodox monastery in Maniava, Ukraine

- Манявський скит
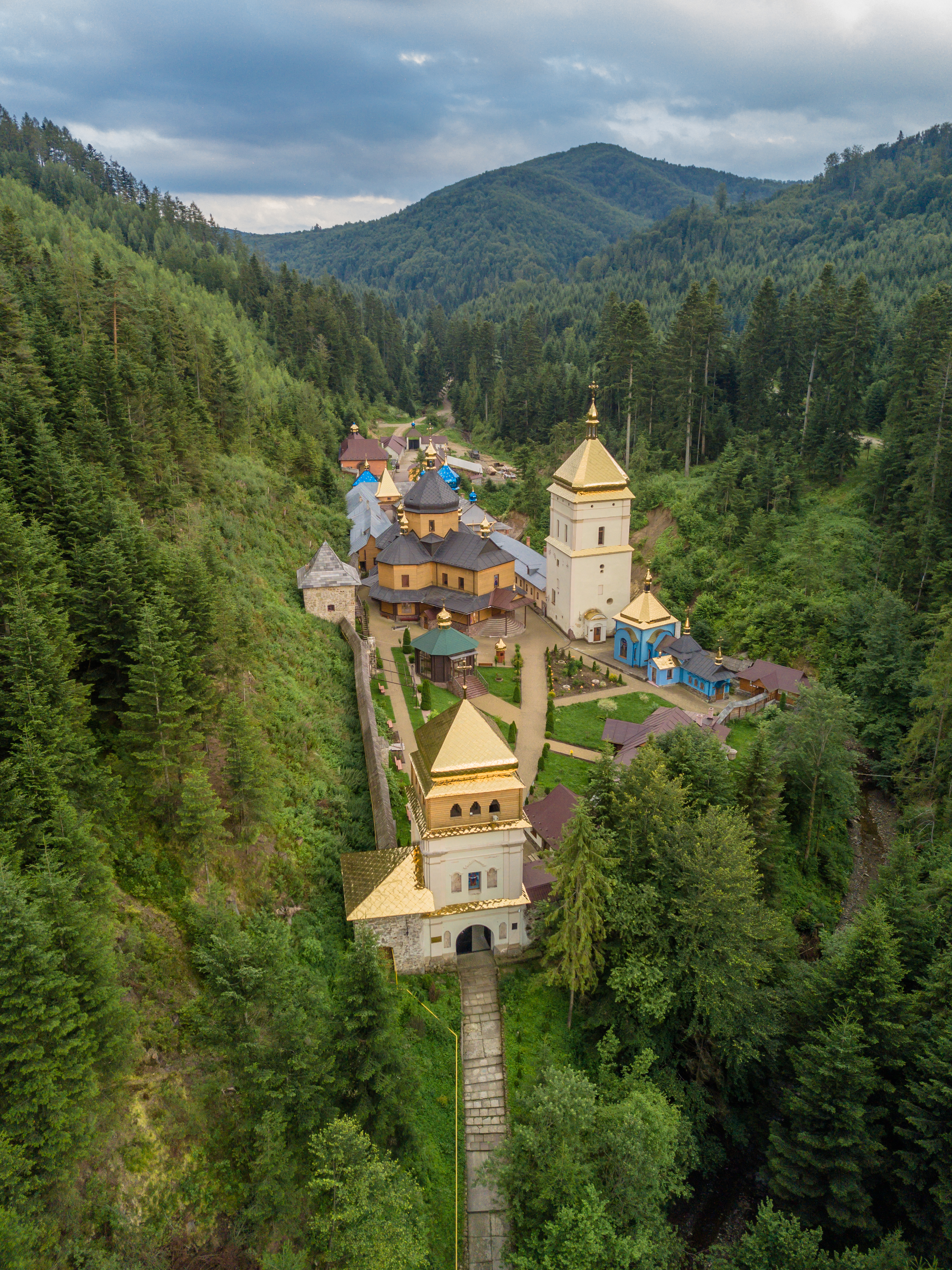

- Location within Ivano-Frankivsk Oblast Location within Ukraine
- Interactive map of Manyava Skete

Monastery information
- Full name: Motronynskyi Women's Monastery of the Holy Trinity
- Denomination: Orthodox Church of Ukraine
- Established: 1628
- Reestablished: 1990s
- Controlled churches: Church of the Exaltation of the Holy Cross; Church of Holy Martyrs Borys and Hlib; Church of the Archangel Michael

People
- Founders: Saint Job of Manyava; Saint Theodosius of Manyava; Ivan Vyshenskyi

Site
- Location: Maniava
- Country: Ukraine
- Coordinates: 48.6561°N 24.3927°E

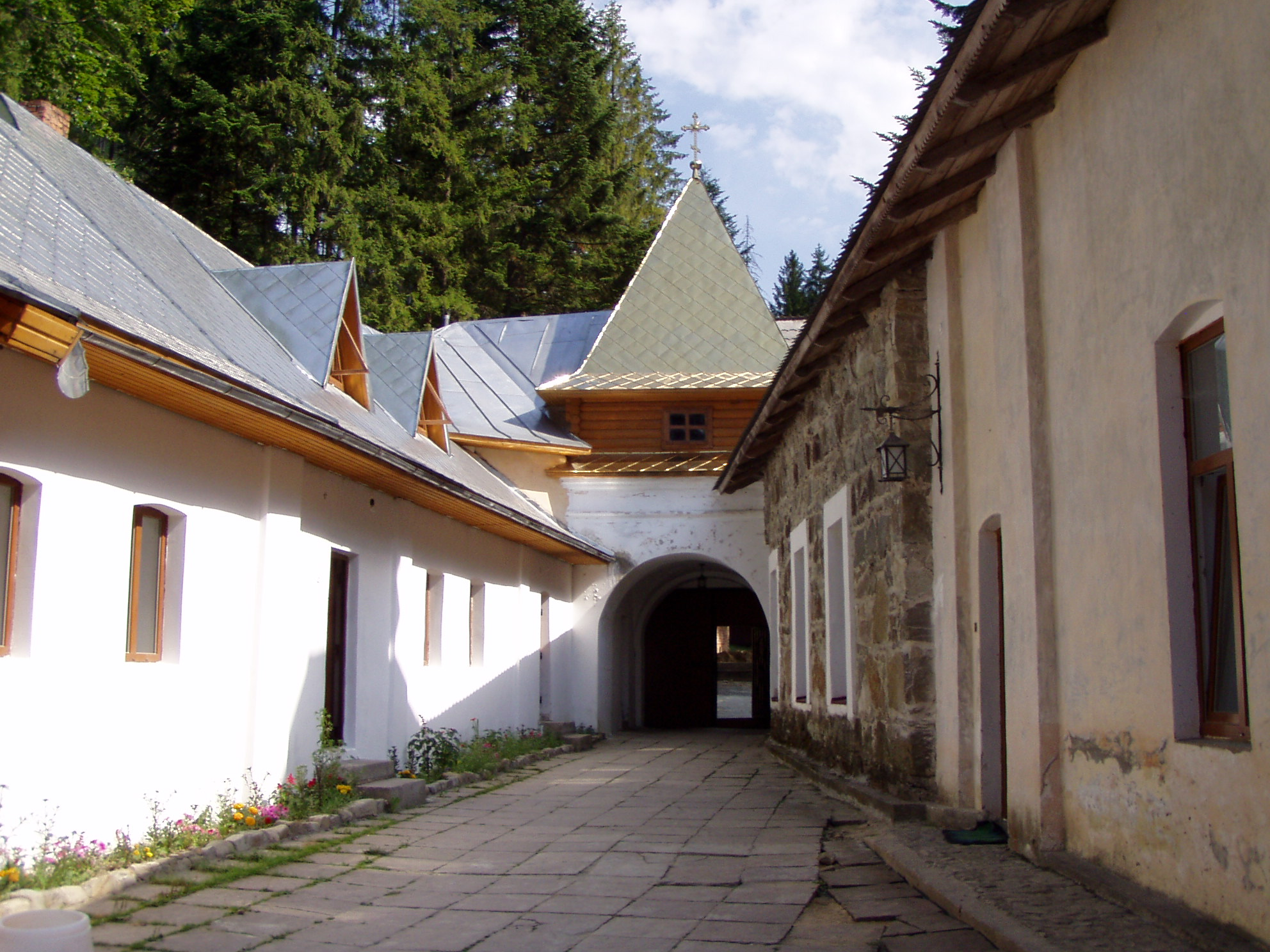
Dwelling quarters of monks, Manyava Skete.

Manyava Skete of the Exaltation of the Holy Cross, (also transliterated as Maniava or Manjava Skete), otherwise known as Ukrainian Athos, is an Orthodox solitary-cell men's monastery (skete) in the Carpathian Mountains of western Ukraine. It is situated on the outskirts of the village of Maniava in Ivano-Frankivsk Raion of Ivano-Frankivsk Oblast and belongs to the Orthodox Church of Ukraine. Hegumen of the monastery is Ioasaf, metropolitan of Ivano-Frankivsk and Halych. Currently there are 8 monks residing at the monastery.

Manyava Skete is famous for the apparition of the Virgin Mary who appeared here twice and for its miracle-working icon of Manyava Icon of Mother of God. The icon "cried" twice, shedding myrrh (supernatural oil) in 2004 and last in spring of 2012. These events were widely reported by the Ukrainian news and TV media. Thousands of Orthodox pilgrims arrive here during the year.

== History ==
It played an imported role as an Orthodox spiritual center during the 17th and 18th centuries. In 1628 at the Kyiv church synod Manyava Skete was granted the status of "prot", the principal heading monastery over the monasteries in the Ruthenian, Belz and Podolian Voivodeships. Over 500 monasteries in Ukraine, Moldova and Romania were under its control.

The Orthodox monastery of Manyava was founded and developed in the period between 1606 - 1785. The founding father of the monastery is Saint Job of Maniava, who was a monk on Mount Athos in Greece for some time before. In 1606, together with Ivan Vyshensky and religious writer Zakhariya Kopystensky of Kyiv Pechersk lavra he organized the first monk community here.

In 1618 there were 40 monks residing in the skete. In 1621 the monastery was granted stauropegic status and that meant its direct subordination to the Patriarch of Constantinople.

Right after its renovation in 1781, it was unexpectedly closed down by Austrian authorities on 1 July 1785. The monastery in Maniava was reestablished with the collapse of communism in Ukraine in the early 1990s, nearly 200 years later.

The clairvoyant hegumen Ioann / John (in the world: Vasyl Hrynyuk), known for his kind-heartedness, was the first head of Manyava Skete after it was reopened. Many Orthodox faithful from Ukraine, Russia and Poland sought his help. Having foreseen his death, he died in 2003 and is buried on the site of the monastery and his grave is much venerated by the Orthodox pilgrims.

== Marian apparitions ==
In 1652 there was the plague epidemic in the skete and the neighbouring areas. Many monks were dying from it. The remaining monks were pleading to God for mercy. On 22 December 1652, the Manyava hieromonk Filaret had a dream vision of Blessed Theotokos being dressed in a red hegumen's cloak, who came in through the monastery gates and entered the Church of Annunciation of Virgin Mary and having stopped there, said. "The plague will already stop". In remembrance of this event there is an icon "Hegumenia of the Manyava monastery" kept in the skete.

== Churches in the skete ==
In Manyva Skete there are three churches. The main one of the Exaltation of the Holy Cross, the second church is of the holy martyrs Borys and Hlib and besides these there is also an underground church dedicated to Archangel Michael.

== Prominent visitors ==
The second president of Ukraine, Leonid Kuchma visited the place and supported the restoration of the monastery. Other presidents of Ukraine, such as Viktor Yushchenko, Georgian president Mikhail Saakashvili, and Russian president Boris Yeltsin all visited the Manyava Skete.

Patriarch Filaret and many of the hierarchs of the Orthodox Church of Ukraine visit Maniava Skete on a regular basis.

== Blessed Stone and sacred spring ==
Manyava Skete is also famous for its "Blessed Stone", regarded as a place of prayer and spiritual purification. The stone reminds a giant cave with the space of 10 x 3 meters, a typical dwelling of the solitary monks, a skete. This was a first place, where the founding monks (the first apostles of the subcarpathian highland) settled in the 13th century.

The spring of healing water emits from underneath the Blessed Stone. It is said that the water has the same healing properties as the waters of Lourdes. The spring ceased when the monastery was closed and miraculously started flowing again with the reopening of Maniava Skete.
