= Theodosius of Manyava =

Ukrainian Orthodox hegumen and saint (died 1629)

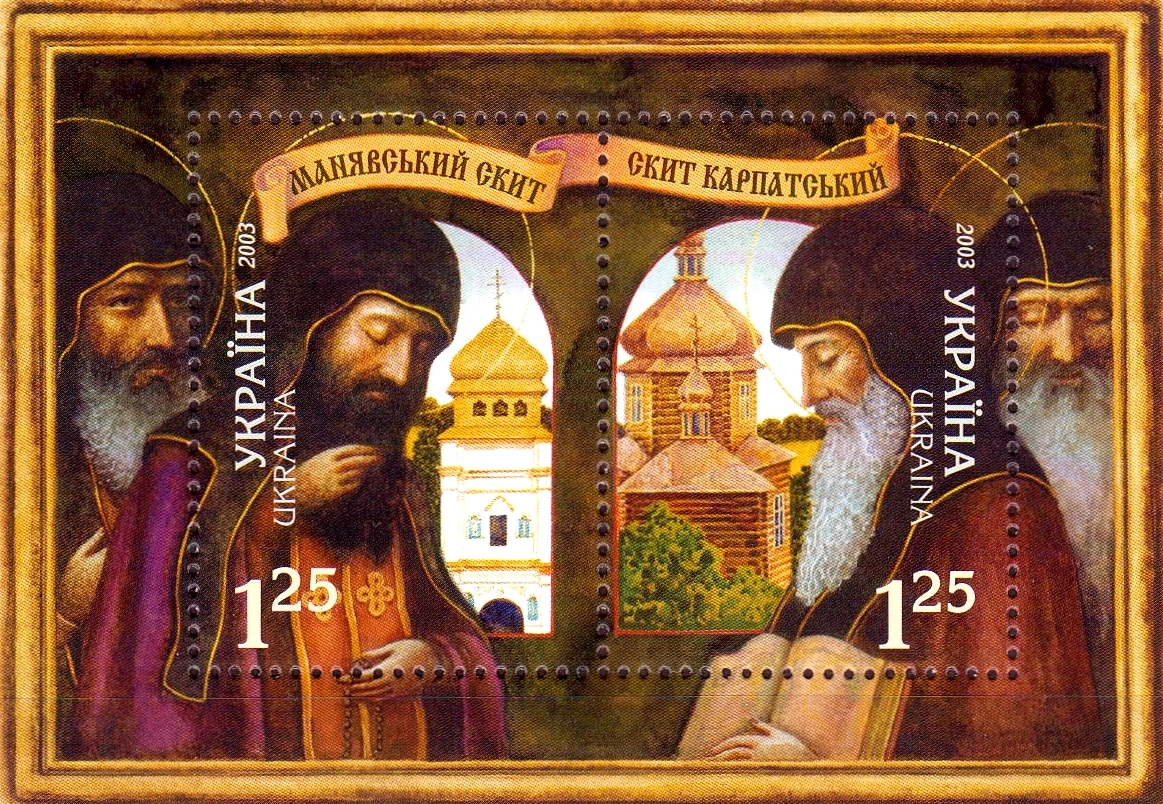
Saint Job and Theodosius of Manyava. Postal stamp of Ukraine (2003).

Theodosius of Manyava (Ukrainian: Феодосій Манявський, died 24 September 1629 in Manyava Skete, Ukraine) is a Ukrainian Orthodox saint, venerable, ascetic and one of the founders and the second hegumen (abbot) of Manyava Skete, men's cell solitary monastery in the Carpathian Mountains of western Ukraine.

Since his younger years, he was drawn to the church and spirituality. He served as a hierodeacon (deacon-monk) when, in 1608, he and a few others joined Job of Manyava to follow him in very strict ascetic practices, and to become monks in seclusion and wilderness of the Carpathian Mountains. He was chosen, among others, by Job for his zeal and humility. With God's blessing and help of the Christian community, the monks built a mountain monastery (skete) and, on the Feast of Exaltation of the Holy Cross, the monastery church was consecrated in 1612.

In all the works, Theodosius served as assistant to Job and when the latter was leaving for a pilgrimage to the Kyiv Caves Monastery, he entrusted the former to be the head of the community by saying, "Be our shepherd and spiritual father, you ought to be hegumen, I will be assisting you as long as I live".

In the end of 1621, 70 year old Job fell sick and died on 29 December 1621. Theodosius headed the monastery for 8 years after Job's death. He also wrote Job’s biography.

In 1628, he took part in the First Synod of Kyivan metropoly after the Brest Union. The synod was summoned by the Orthodox metropolitan of Kyiv and Halych Job Boretsky in the Golden Domed Saint Michael's monastery in Kyiv.

Theodosius lived giving a great example of sanctity and virtue. Rumours about his strict and virtuous living spread through the Carpathians, Galicia, Volynia and Northern Bukovina, Moldova, and Romania. Theodosius' spiritual authority and the strict monastic rules of his community brought about much respect on the part of other Orthodox monasteries in the entire region. At the church synod of 1628, hegumen Thodosius and his Manayva monastic community were chosen to be the heading monastery (prot) in charge over 556 other monasteries in western Ukraine and Moldavia (among the subordinated monasteries were Suceava and Neamț monasteries).

Theodosius' contemporary, Peter Mohyla, the metropolitan of Kyiv, wrote: "If you wish to see God´s servants in human likeness, go to the Carpathians, where 200 angels in human flesh dedicated their lives to God by their service".

Having contributed much to the welfare of Manyava Skete and many other monasteries, Theodosius died in 1629 and was buried next to his teacher, Job. The large stone tombstone with an Orthodox cross engraved upon it, that had covered their graves, is kept and venerated in Manyava Skete.

== Canonization ==
Theodosius was canonized both by Ukrainian Orthodox Church of Moscow Patriarchate and by the Ukrainian Orthodox Church of Kyiv Patriarchate.

His memory is celebrated on 24 September (Church Calendar), which equates to 7 October (civil calendar).

Common memory, together with Job of Manyava, is celebrated on 24 June (Church Calendar), which equates to 7 July (civil calendar).
