= Eula Beal =

American opera singer

Beal performing Franz Schubert's "Erlkönig", accompanied by Marguerite Campbell

Eula Beal Garnett (January 25, 1919 – July 29, 2008) professionally billed as Eula Beal, was an American opera lyric contralto. During her relatively short touring career, she performed with distinguished collaborators not only in concert on the US West Coast but also in Concert Magic, a 1947 film billed as "the first motion picture concert."

== Life and career ==
Beal was born in Riverside, California. Touring the United States as a concert contralto in the 1940s, she appeared with orchestras including the Phoenix Symphony and the Los Angeles Philharmonic. With the latter ensemble, she performed in two works by Gustav Mahler: his Eighth Symphony, under Eugene Ormandy at the Hollywood Bowl, and Kindertotenlieder. Beal's operatic appearances included interpretations of Erda in Wagner's Siegfried and the innkeeper in Boris Godunov with the San Francisco Opera during the 1948 season. She also sang at Radio City Music Hall and the Tanglewood Festival with the Boston Pops.

Beal's present fame rests on her participation in Concert Magic, an unscripted film presenting, as the title would suggest, a classical concert. Beal was the sole vocalist; instrumentalists included pianists Adolph Baller, Jakob Gimpel, and Marguerite Campbell; violinist Yehudi Menuhin; and an orchestra billed as "Symphony Orchestra of Hollywood" under the baton of Antal Dorati. Interspersed with purely instrumental selections, Beal performed the Bach-Gounod "Ave Maria"; Franz Schubert's "Erlkönig" and "Ave Maria"; Tchaikovsky's "None but the lonely heart"; and, with wonderful intensity, "Lord, Have Mercy on Me" (Erbarme dich, mein Gott) from the St. Matthew Passion of Johann Sebastian Bach.

Beal married well-known aerial photographer William Garnett in 1941. The couple had three sons and remained married until his death in 2006. After but a decade on the concert circuit, she opted to abandon her full-time performing career to devoting her time to her family. Nonetheless, she remained sporadically active in northern California, where she and Garnett made their home; besides providing music at local funerals and churches, she performed with the San Francisco Symphony, the Santa Rosa Symphony, the Napa Symphony, and a local Napa, California choral group. She died in Napa in 2008.
