= Gimpel =

Gimpel may refer to:

- Gimpel (mountain) (2,173 m), a mountain in the Allgäu Alps
- Gimpel (surname)
- Gimpel Software, the creator of PC-lint
- Gimpel Fils, art gallery
- A breed of Archangel pigeon

== Fictional characters ==
- "Gimpel the Fool", a short story by Isaac Bashevis Singer
- Gimpel the errand boy from "The Snow in Chelm" by Isaac Bashevis Singer

== See also ==
- GIMPLE
- Gimpl
