= Lypivka, Ivano-Frankivsk Oblast =

Village in Ivano-Frankivsk Oblast, Ukraine

Lypivka Липівка
- Village
- Location within Ukraine Location within Ivano-Frankivsk Oblast
- Coordinates: 48°47′N 24°45′E
- Country: Ukraine
- Oblast: Ivano-Frankivsk Oblast
- Raion: Ivano-Frankivsk Raion
- Hromada: Tysmenytsia urban hromada
- Established: 1349

Area
  - Total: 25 km^{2} (9.7 sq mi)

Population
  - Total: 1,880
- Website: Ukrainian Parliament website

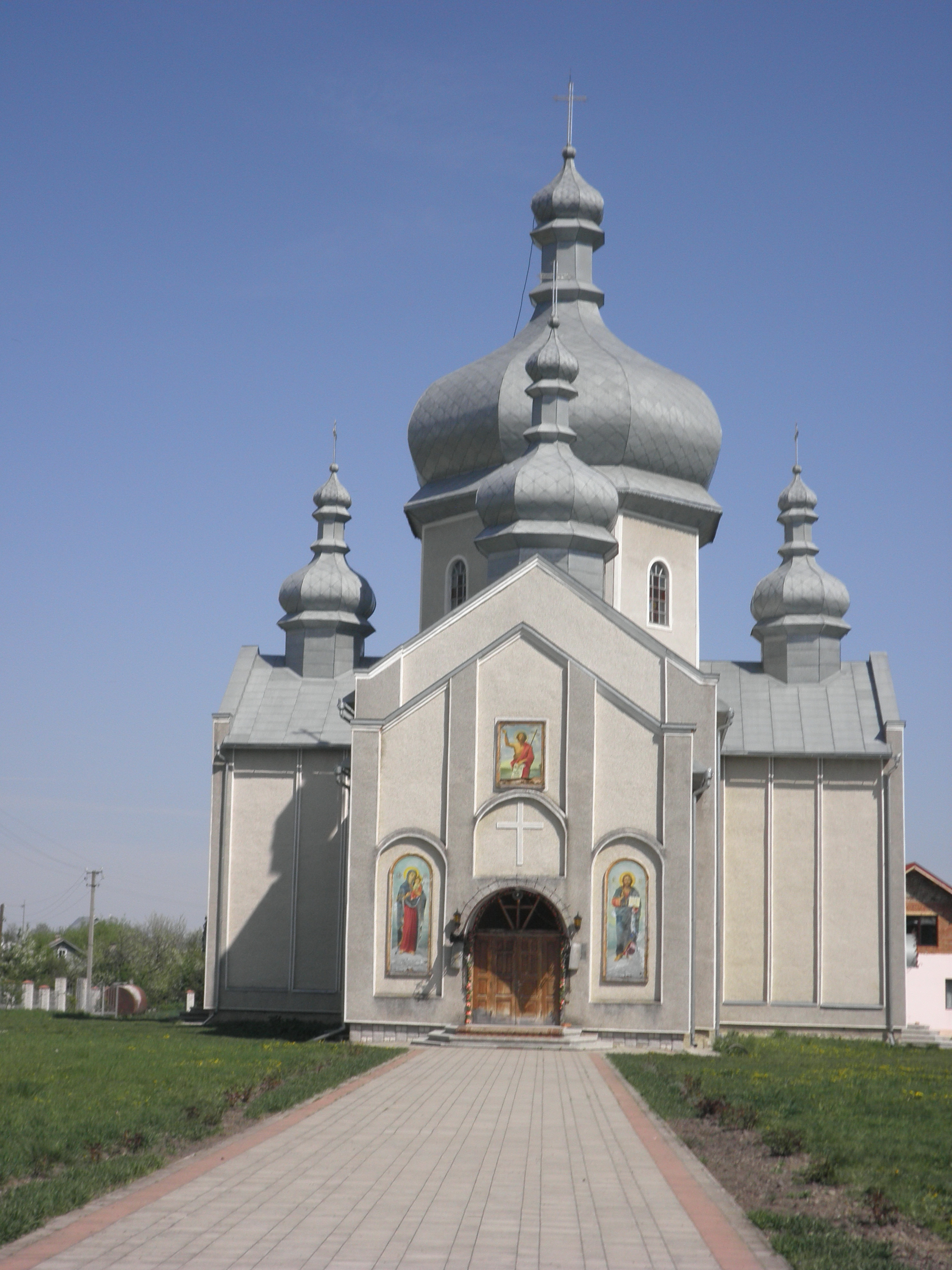

Lypivka (Ukrainian: Липівка) is a village in western Ukraine. It is located in Ivano-Frankivsk Raion, Ivano-Frankivsk Oblast, approximately 20 km south of the oblast capital, Ivano-Frankivsk. Lypivka belongs to Tysmenytsia urban hromada, one of the hromadas of Ukraine.

Lypivka was previously referred to as Lackie Szlacheckie, as part of the Tłumacz Powiat (county). It is also a part of the historic region of Pokuttya in Galicia. The name is associated with Polish gentry who lived in the area.

Until 18 July 2020, Lypivka belonged to Tysmenytsia Raion. The raion was abolished in July 2020 as part of the administrative reform of Ukraine, which reduced the number of raions of Ivano-Frankivsk Oblast to six. The area of Tysmenytsia Raion was merged into Ivano-Frankivsk Raion.
