= Chune Wolfsthal =

Chune Wolfsthal חנא װאָלפסטאַל
- Chune Wolfsthal, date unknown

Background information
- Born: Chune Wolfthal circa 1851; Tysmenytsia, Galicia
- Died: 18 December 1924 Lviv or Ternopil
- Genres: klezmer, Yiddish theatre, operetta, military marches
- Occupations: traditional Jewish musician, theatre composer, bandleader
- Instrument: cello
- Works: Di Malke Shvo, Bas Yerushalaim
- Years active: 1860s–1924

Chune Wolfsthal (Yiddish: חנא װאָלפסטאַל, c.1851–1924) was a Polish Jewish composer, cellist, orchestra leader, and klezmer musician. After playing in a family klezmer band throughout the late 19th century, he saw an Abraham Goldfaden play staged in Lviv in 1889 and was convinced to become a composer for the Yiddish theatre instead. Although his operettas were widely popular in Europe and in the United States, they were never published; he did not receive royalties for their performances abroad and died quite poor. Some of his songs are still performed today, such as Freitag auf der nacht.

== Biography ==
Wolfsthal was born in 1851, or possibly 1853, in Tysmenytsia, Galicia, Austria-Hungary (today in Ivano-Frankivsk Oblast, Ukraine). His father Majer Leib Wolfthal was a Hazzan and musician with broad musical tastes; he had his sons learn instruments and sing in his choir, and Chune learned the cello. Apparently Chune was mostly self-taught as a musician, with some guidance from his father and local klezmer musicians in Tsymenytsia.

Chune and his brothers formed a family klezmer band and relocated to Ternopil in 1869, a larger city in Galicia which offered more opportunities; they changed their name to the more German-sounding Wolfsthal. Chune became leader of the band and started composing his own klezmer pieces at a young age. According to Chune's nephew, the composer Karol Rathaus, Chune had a natural gift for composition. The band became popular in neighboring towns and cities, performing not only at Jewish weddings but also Hanukkah concerts in Synagogues and at non-Jewish balls. His compositions began to circulate among other klezmer bands and orchestras, generally without him being credited as the composer. At some point during this era, Chune also played in a military band and received some musical training; he composed marches and other martial music which circulated more widely among Austro-Hungarian military bands. Chune's brothers and their children received more formal musical training and several became classical musicians, including Maurycy Wolfsthal, who became a violinist and music instructor in Lviv.

Portrait of Chune Wolfsthal, undated.

In 1889 Yankev Ber Gimpel, who had recently opened the first permanent Yiddish theatre in Lviv, brought Abraham Goldfaden to stage Shulamith there and invited Wolfsthal to see it. Wolfsthal was stunned by this new Jewish genre and decided to move to Lviv, soon becoming a composer and orchestra leader at Gimpel's theatre. Although he had written others earlier, his first operetta to be staged was Der Teufel als Regent in 1900. He may have felt overworked in Gimpel's Theatre and left to tour with his own troupe instead. He continued coming out with new operettas regularly during this era, staging them in European capitals such as Berlin, Bucharest, and Budapest, where one of his best operettas Die Tochter Jeruschulajims was performed 90 times in 6 months. In 1903, Wolfsthal was hired for an extended engagement at Abraham Axelrad's theatre in Chernivtsi.

His operettas became incredibly popular in the United States and elsewhere, partly due to the steady exodus of his Yiddish actors to America. Wolfsthal's nephew Karol Rathaus later stated that Die drei Matunes, Bostenai (1896), and Die Tochter Jeruschulajims were the three which achieved the widest international popularity among Jewish audiences. His songs and musical themes were also plagiarized to be used in new operettas written abroad without compensating or acknowledging him. Among his most popular songs were Freitag auf der nacht; the American publisher got rich with an uncredited publication of it, and which was still performed and recorded by Yiddish singers throughout the 20th century. After some of his best actors in Chernivtsi left for the United States, Wolfsthal returned to Lviv in 1912 to resume his work there.

He relocated to Vienna in 1913, where he worked as a conductor and soloist in Ziegler's Jewish theatre; in most biographies this is described as fleeing the outbreak of the war, but it predated it. Rathaus described it as one of the high points of his life. He briefly returned to Lviv after the war to play in restaurants and cafes, but when his habitual Café Abbazia and other venues were destroyed in the Lviv pogrom of 1918, he returned to Ternopil. He lived his remaining years in relative poverty, despite his operettas and songs making performers rich in New York. According to Sholem Perlmutter, playwright in the American Yiddish Theatre, Wolfsthal continued playing in a small restaurant with his brothers and rejected any suggestion of emigrating to America. Rathaus described him as working night after night, performing and giving violin lessons, and getting by mainly with the support of his daughter and occasional money sent to him from the United States. He wasn't forgotten, though, as in 1923 he was invited to play in various cities; in a full concert dedicated to his compositions in Lviv, and one in Przemyśl where his compositions formed part of a programme with other Polish Jewish composers.

He developed severe Asthma and died in Lviv on 18 December 1924. (Some sources state his place of death as Ternopil.) None of his operettas were ever published, and he left behind some which had never been staged; and some of his musical manuscripts ended up with YIVO in Vilnius, or with Sholem Perlmutter in New York, who had worked with him before emigrating.

1927 poster for a performance of Wolfsthal's Di Dray Matunes in Zablotow

== Operettas ==
- Bostenai/בוסתנאי (1896, Libretto by Isaac Auerbach)
- Der Teufel als Regent/דער טײפל אַלס רעגענט (The devil as ruler, 1900, Libretto by Moses Schor)
- Yehude Halevi, oder Die Sehnsucht nach Zion/ר’ יהודה הלױ (1909, Yehuda Halevy, or the longing for Zion; libretto by Isaac Auerbach)
- Der komische Ball/דער קאָמישער באַל (The comic ball)
- Die Malka Schwu, Königin von Saba/די מלכה שבא (Malke Shvo, Queen of Sheba, 1900; libretto by Moishe Zeifert/Sholem Perlmutter)
- Satan im Paradies/סאטן אין פּאַראַדיס (Satan in paradise)
- Die Tochter Jeruschulajims/בת ירושלים (Daughter of Jerusalem, 1900, libretto by Isaac Auerbach)
- Die drei Matunes/די דרײ מתנות (The three gifts, based on a story by I. L. Peretz)
- Fluch der Liebe, Melodrama/פלוך דער ליבע (Curse of love, melodrama)
- Der Fremde (c. 1913, based on a story by I. L. Peretz)
- דער מגן־דוד (The star of David, 1907, never staged, libretto by Isaac Weinstock)
- דער מאַן און זײן שאָטן (The man and his shadow, never staged)
- מאַן־װאָלף (Man-wolf, never staged)
