= William Garnett (photographer) =

American photographer (1916–2006)

William A. Garnett (December 27, 1916 – August 26, 2006) was an American landscape photographer who specialized in aerial photography.

== Early life ==
Garnett was born in Chicago, Illinois, in 1916, and in 1920 his family moved to Pasadena, California. After graduating from Pasadena's John Muir Technical High School he studied for one year at the Art Center School in Los Angeles and then, beginning in 1938, he worked for two years as an independent commercial photographer and graphic designer.

== Career ==
In 1940 he was hired as a photographer by the Pasadena Police Department, where he was employed for four years. In 1944 he worked briefly for the Lockheed aircraft company before being drafted into the U.S. Army, where he assisted in the production of training films for the U.S. Signal Corps.

After leaving the Army in 1945 Garnett used the G.I. Bill to pay for flight instruction and by 1949 he had purchased his first plane and begun capturing the aerial photographs for which he is admired. His work began to attract critical attention and in 1953 he won the first of three Guggenheim fellowships for his beautiful landscapes.

In 1955, Garnett had his first one-man show at the George Eastman House in Rochester, New York. His work was also included in Edward Steichen's The Family of Man exhibition at the Museum of Modern Art in New York City in 1955.

Garnett bought a Cessna 170B in 1956 and he used it for decades as a vantage point for his photography. He made small modifications to the plane to facilitate his photography. According to the Getty Museum, Garnett "experimented with a variety of camera formats and films but found that two 35mm cameras (one loaded with black-and-white film, and another with color film) best suited his needs." He may have also used Pentax 6X7 medium format cameras to capture his imagery.

In 1958 Garnett moved from Los Angeles to Napa, California, and continued working as a commercial photographer for the next ten years. In 1968 he joined the College of Environmental Design at the University of California, Berkeley. He served as a professor at the university until his retirement in 1984.

Garnett's photography was featured in many national magazines, including Fortune, Life, Reader's Digest, and The New York Times Magazine. His unique landscapes have also appeared in many art books and as illustrations in many textbooks.

His work has been collected by the J. Paul Getty Museum in Los Angeles, the Museum of Modern Art in New York, the San Francisco Museum of Modern Art, the Metropolitan Museum of Art in New York, and the Smithsonian Institution in Washington, D.C.

== Personal life ==
In 1941 Garnett married contralto Eula Beal (1919–2008) and together they raised three sons.

Garnett died on August 26, 2006, at his home in Napa, California.

== Quotes ==
I was discharged and heard you could hitchhike on the transport taking GIs home. The airplane was full, but the captain let me sit in the navigator's seat so I had a command view. I was amazed at the variety and beauty of these United States. I had never seen anything like that-in a book, in school, or since then. So I changed my career.

== Books by Garnett ==
- The Extraordinary Landscape. Boston: Little, Brown, 1982. ISBN 978-0821215074.
- William Garnett, Aerial Photographs. Berkeley: University of California Press, 1996. ISBN 978-0520083486.
