= Tysmenytsia urban hromada =

Hromada in Ivano-Frankivsk Oblast, Ukraine

Tysmenytsia urban hromada Тисменицька міська громада
- hromada
- Location within Ivano-Frankivsk Oblast Location within Ukraine
- Coordinates: 48°54′03″N 24°50′57″E
- Country: Ukraine
- Oblast: Ivano-Frankivsk Oblast
- Raion: Ivano-Frankivsk Raion
- Administrative center: Tysmenytsia

Area
  - Total: 2,497 km^{2} (964 sq mi)

Population (2020)
  - Total: 28,750
- Sity: 1
- Villages: 18
- Website: tsmth.gov.ua

Tysmenytsia urban hromada (Ukrainian: Тисменицька міська громада) is a hromada in Ukraine, in Ivano-Frankivsk Raion of Ivano-Frankivsk Oblast. The administrative center is the city of Tysmenytsia.

== Settlements ==
The hromada consists of 1 city (Tysmenytsia) and 18 villages:

- Vilshanytsia
- Klubivtsi
- Krasylivka
- Lypivka
- Markivtsi
- Myluvannia
- Nova Lypivka
- Novi Kryvotuly
- Odai
- Pohonia
- Pshenychnyky
- Roshniv
- Slobidka
- Stari Kryvotuly
- Studynets
- Ternovytsia
- Khomiakivka
- Chornoliztsi
