= Yankev Ber Gimpel =

- יעקב בער גימפּעל
- I. B. Gimpel, undated
- Born: 1840; Lviv
- Died: January 1906 (aged 65–66); Lviv
- Occupations: choral singer, theatre operator
- Years active: 1880s–1906
- Known for: operating Gimpel's Theatre in Lviv

Yankev-Ber Gimpel (Yiddish: יעקב בער גימפּעל, 1840–1906), often known as I. B. Gimpel, opened and operated the first Yiddish theatre in Lviv, which was also the first permanent Yiddish theatre in the Austro-Hungarian province of Galicia.

== Biography ==
Gimpel was born in 1840 in Lviv, Galicia, Austria-Hungary (today in Ukraine). Little is known about his early life. He was said to have a beautiful singing voice, and was a choral singer in Polish theatres in Lviv, including the prestigious Skarbek Theatre, for 40 years before launching his own theatre. He had at least two sons: Emil, born 1867, would eventually take over the theatre, and Adolph, born 1875, became a well-known concert clarinetist. Adolph's sons Karol and Bronislav became well-known concert pianists, and Jakob a violinist.

Prior to Gimpel opening his theatre, Jewish theatres in Galicia mainly operated in German, and were only rarely given licenses to perform in Yiddish. Yiddish theatrical performances in Galicia tended to be put on by touring troupes from Romania, or small-scale performances by Galician entertainers called Broder zingers. In late 1888, due to being a well-known figure in the Polish theatre, he was able to obtain a concession from the civil authorities in Lviv to open the first Yiddish-language theatre in the city. In fact, the original concession specified that the theatre should perform in German with an Austrian military band accompanying it, but Gimpel soon abandoned that for more authentically Yiddish acting and music. The religious (frum) Jewish community in Lviv, as well as some communal Jewish institutions, objected to the opening of a permanent Jewish theatre in the city.

Gimpel had a talent for recruiting strong actors from the local community for his new theatre. He initially marketed it as a Polish-Jewish (אידיש־פּױליש טעאַטע or Teatr polsko-żydowski) theatre, but after objections from local Poles, he rebranded it as German-Jewish (דײטש־אידיש טעאַטער or Lemberger deutsch-jüdisches Theater). Their early performances staged Russian plays and works of Abraham Goldfaden, who originally created the Yiddish theatre in Iași. It received positive reviews in the local Polish press, and the shows became very popular among Jewish audiences. Goldfaden, who had returned from New York in 1890, was brought in for a year to stage his own plays at Gimpel's Theatre and train local actors. This early cohort included people who later became stars of the Yiddish Theatre in New York, such as Bertha Kalich, Regina Prager and Ludwig Satz. Gimpel also invited a prominent klezmer musician and composer, Chune Wolfsthal, to attend Goldfaden's shows, and he was so impressed he joined the theatre. However, Goldfaden and Gimpel didn't get along, and Goldfaden left for Bucharest. In 1893, the theatre began to market itself as the Jüdisches Opern-theater (Jewish opera theatre).

The theatre's popularity only continued to increase, eventually becoming the most popular Yiddish theatre in Europe before the First World War. Due to its fame, Gimpel had issues with being able to retain his star actors, as theatres in New York could easily entice them away.

Yankev Ber died in Lviv in January 1906. His son Emil took over operation of the theatre.
