= Klubivtsi =

Village in Ivano-Frankivsk Oblast, Ukraine

Klubivtsi Клубівці
- Village
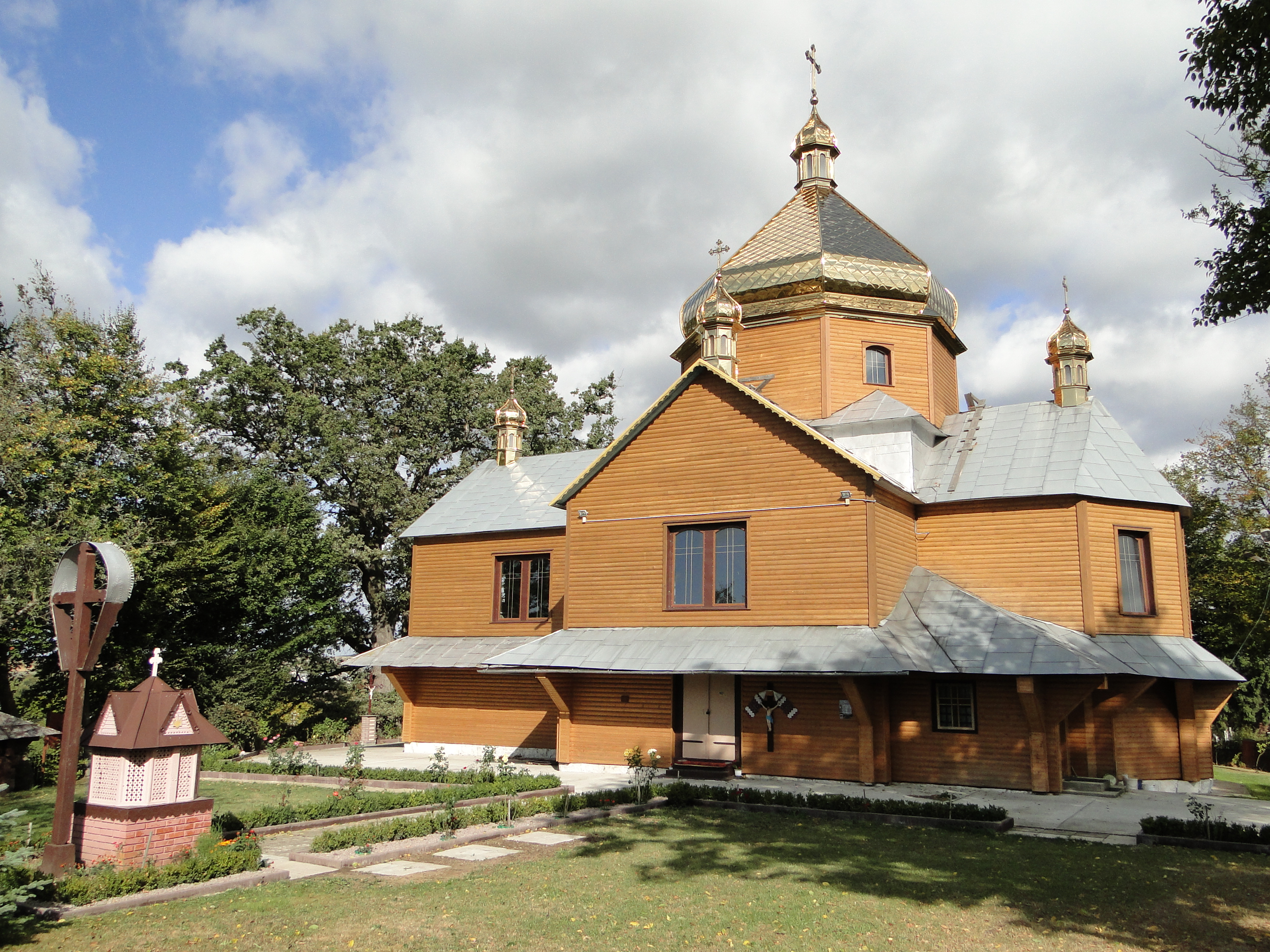
- Church of the Intercession

- Flag Coat of arms
- Interactive map of Klubivtsi
- Location in Ivano-Frankivsk Oblast
- Coordinates: 48°54′47″N 24°54′55″E
- Country: Ukraine
- Oblast: Ivano-Frankivsk Oblast
- Raion: Ivano-Frankivsk Raion
- Hromada: Tysmenytsia urban hromada

Population (2001)
  - Total: 1,416
- Time zone: UTC+2 (EET)
  - Summer (DST): UTC+3 (EEST)
- Postal code: 77443

Klubivtsi (Ukrainian: Клубі́вці; Polish: Kłubowce) is a village in the Tysmenytsia urban hromada of the Ivano-Frankivsk Raion of Ivano-Frankivsk Oblast in Ukraine. After the liquidation of the Tysmenytsia Raion on 19 July 2020, the village became part of the Ivano-Frankivsk Raion.

== Notable people ==
- Yevhen Nyshchuk (born 1972), Ukrainian actor and former Minister of Culture of Ukraine.

== Bibliography ==
- "Kłubowce". Geographical Dictionary of the Kingdom of Poland (in Polish). 4. Warszawa: Kasa im. Józefa Mianowskiego. 1883. p. 190.
