= Tysmenytsia =

Urban locality in Ivano-Frankivsk Oblast, Ukraine

Tysmenytsia Тисмениця
- City
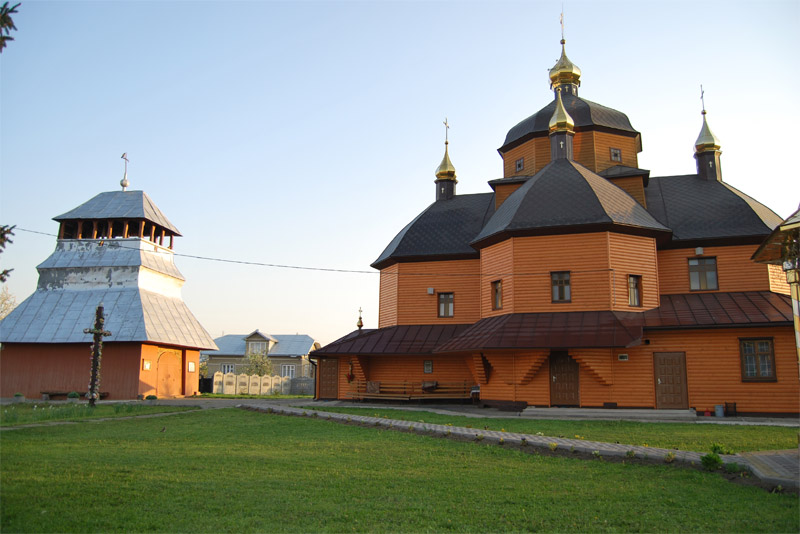
- Church of the Nativity of Our Lady

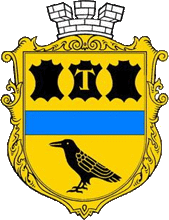
- Flag Coat of arms

- Location within Ivano-Frankivsk Oblast Location within Ukraine
- Coordinates: 48°54′03″N 24°50′57″E
- Country: Ukraine
- Oblast: Ivano-Frankivsk Oblast
- Raion: Ivano-Frankivsk Raion
- Hromada: Tysmenytsia urban hromada
- First mentioned: 950
- Magdeburg rights: 1449

Population (2022)
  - Total: 8,958

Tysmenytsia (Ukrainian: Тисмениця, [ˈtɪsmenɪtsʲɐ]; Polish: Tyśmienica) is a small city in Ivano-Frankivsk Raion, Ivano-Frankivsk Oblast of western Ukraine. It hosts the administration of Tysmenytsia urban hromada, one of the hromadas of Ukraine. Population: 8,958 (2022 estimate).

== Geography ==
The city is also located in very close vicinity to the administrative center of Prykarpattia, Ivano-Frankivsk. It has a population of 9,600 people according to the Ukrainian Census (2001).

The city is famous for its fur factory "Tysmenytsia" that was established back in 1891. In the Soviet times the factory was the fourth major factory within the fur industry of the Ukrainian SSR.

== History ==
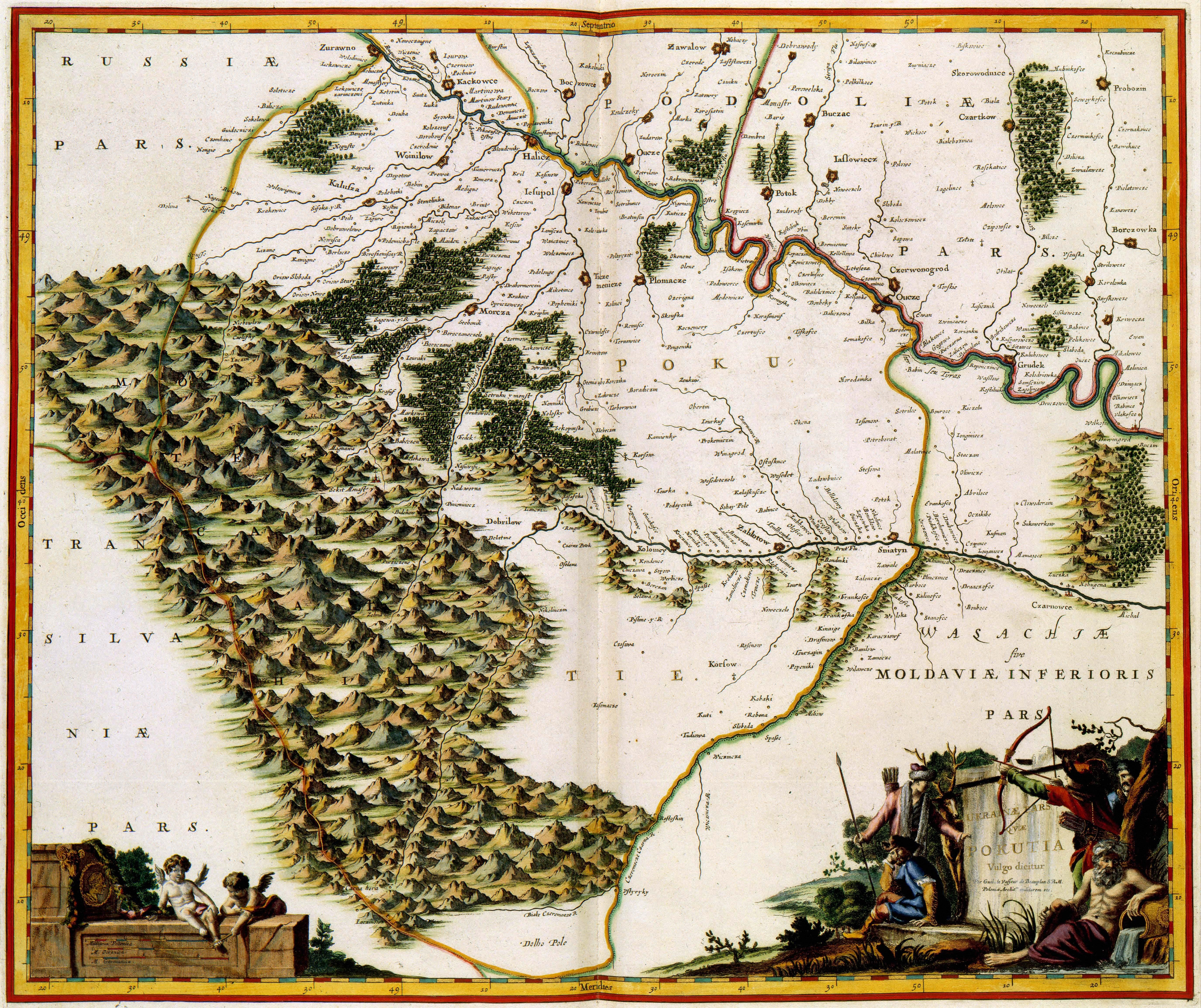
A fortress of Ticzemenieze is shown on the 1639 Beauplan map.

Tysmenytsia was first mentioned in documents from 1143. In 1449, when the village belonged to the Kingdom of Poland, it received Magdeburg rights from Polish king Casimir IV Jagiellon. At that time, it was a royal town, with a Polish name of Tyśmienica. Due to its location near the restless southern border of Poland, Tyśmienica was frequently raided and burned to the ground, by the Crimean Tatars and Wallachians. Around 1540, Armenian merchant warehouses in Tyśmienica were mentioned.

A local Roman Catholic parish was founded by the Voivode of Bracław Voivodeship, Mikołaj Potocki. The church was operated by the Dominican friars under prior Szymon Okolski, who opened a school here. At that time, Tyśmienica belonged to the Potocki family, who invited Armenian merchants to the town. It became home to one of the Armenian communes in Poland. The Dominican monastery was destroyed in 1676, during the Polish–Ottoman War (1672–76), rebuilt in 1678, and expanded in 1763. In 1686, King John III Sobieski visited the town, awaiting Polish soldiers, who returned from a raid on Moldova. Sobieski stayed in a house which was later named “Panski Dom”, and which was demolished in 1939. In 1759, an Armenian church was opened in Tyśmienica.

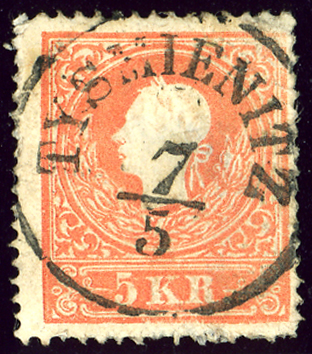
Austrian KK stamp cancelled in 1859 TYSMIENITZ

In 1772, Tysmienica was annexed by the Habsburg Empire in the First Partition of Poland, and remained in Austrian Galicia until 1918. The town, which burned in several fires, lost its importance to the nearby Stanislawow (now Ivano-Frankivsk), and lost its charter. In 1900, Tysmenytsia was in Tłumacz powiat.

Historical population
Year	Pop.	±%
1921	7,027	—
1931	7,257	+3.3%
2022	8,958	+23.4%

In the interbellum period, Tyśmienica returned to Poland, and until the 1939 invasion of Poland belonged to Stanisławów Voivodeship. In September 1939 it was captured by the Red Army, and Soviet authorities destroyed all ancient buildings, such as the Dominican church, Armenian church, the house of Sobieski, and historic cemetery. Under the German occupation, which began August 1941, the Germans, assisted by the Ukrainian police, murdered or deported to Stanisławów, all of the Jewish community of Tysmenytsia, which had numbered around 1500. Those sent to Stanisławów were later sent to the killing camp, Belzec. Few of Tysmenytsia's Jews survived the war.

On March 28, 1982 Tysmenytsia became an administrative center of the former Ivano-Frankivsk Raion. Since then the name of raion was changed correspondingly to its administrative center – Tysmenytsia.

Until 18 July 2020, Tysmenytsia was the administrative center of Tysmenytsia Raion. The raion was abolished in July 2020 as part of the administrative reform of Ukraine, which reduced the number of raions of Ivano-Frankivsk Oblast to six. The area of Tysmenytsia Raion was merged into Ivano-Frankivsk Raion.

== Demographics ==
As of the 2001 Ukrainian census, the town had a population of 9,720. The ethnic composition was as follows:

Ethnic groups in Tysmenytsia
	percent
Ukrainians	99.01%
Russians	0.74%
others	0.25%

== Notable people ==
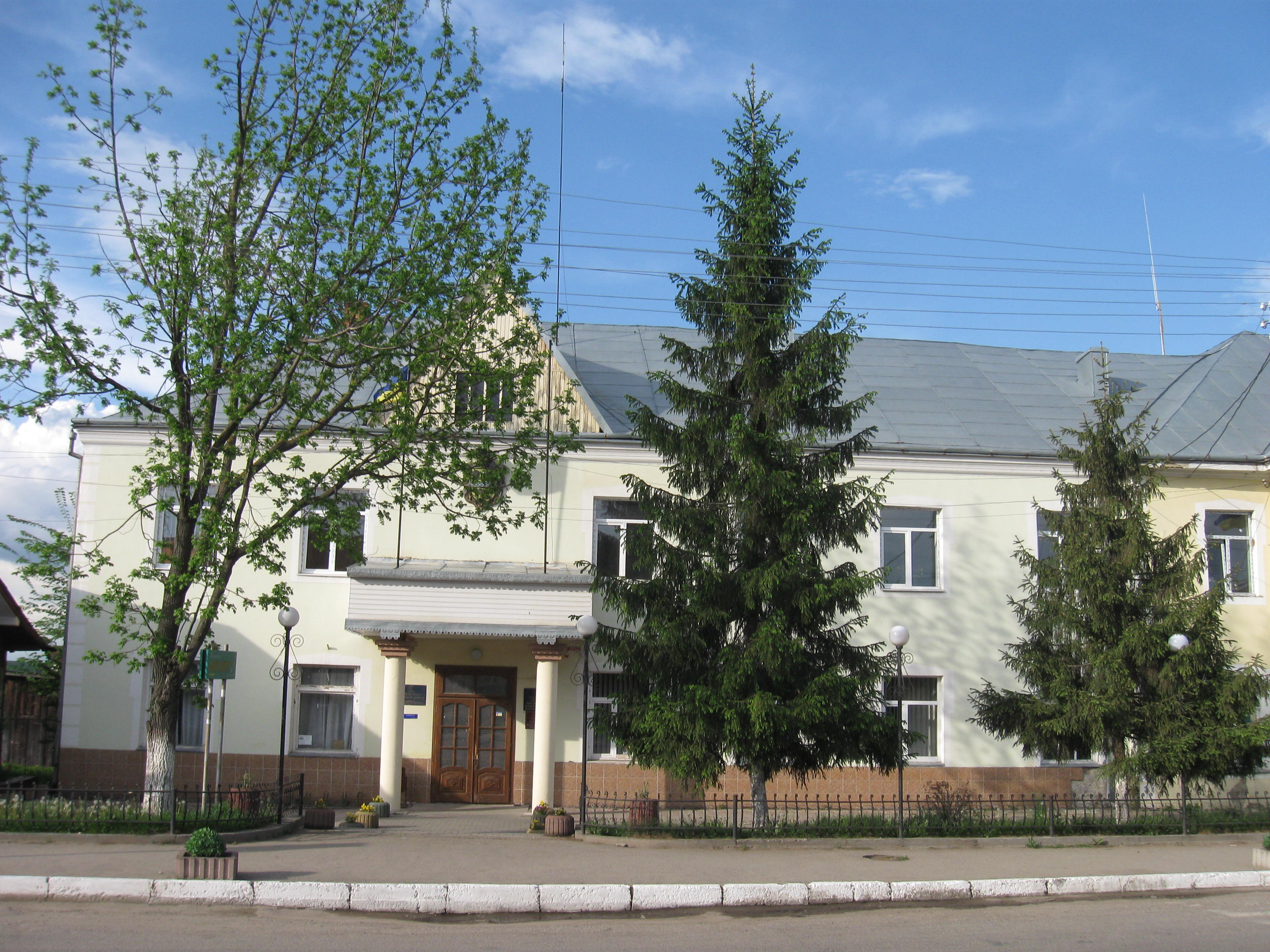
City hall

- Saint Job of Maniava, Ukrainian Orthodox saint born in Tysmenytsia
- Kost Levytsky, Ukrainian politician
- Henry Roth, Jewish American writer
- Oleh Lysheha, Ukrainian poet born in Tysmenytsia
- Jacob Freud, father of Sigmund Freud
- Chune Wolfsthal, cellist and Yiddish theatre composer

== Sister Cities ==
- Bandera, Texas, United States

== Transport ==
Tysmenytsia can be reached by train, bus or by plane to Ivano-Frankivsk, which is about 20 minutes by bus from the city.

Local orientation

Regional orientation
