= Three Concert Études =

Piano compositions by Franz Liszt

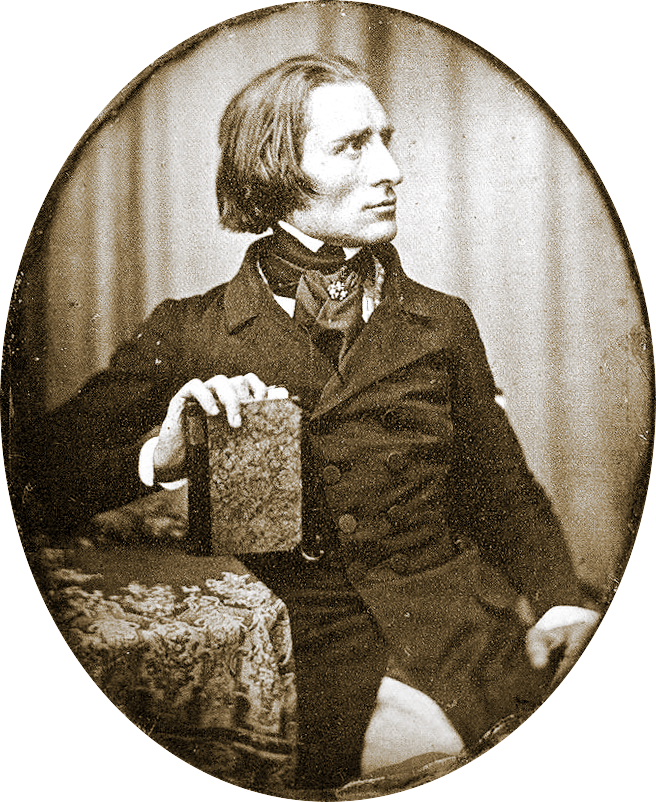
Franz Liszt in 1843

Three Concert Études (Trois études de concert), S.144, is a set of three piano études by Franz Liszt, composed between 1845–49 and published in Paris as Trois caprices poétiques with the three individual titles as they are known today.

As the title indicates, they are intended not only for the acquisition of a better technique, but also for concert performance. Liszt was himself a virtuoso pianist and was able to easily play many complex patterns generally considered difficult. The Italian subtitles now associated with the études—Il lamento ("The Lament"), La leggierezza ("Lightness"), and Un sospiro ("A sigh")—first appeared in the French edition.

== Étude No. 1, Il lamento ==
Il lamento is the first of the études. Written in A♭ major, it is among Liszt's longest pieces in the genre. It starts with a four-note lyrical melody which folds itself through the work, followed by a chromatic pattern which reappears again in the coda. Although the piece opens and ends in A♭ major, it shifts throughout its three parts to many other keys, A, G, D♯, F♯ and B among them.

== Étude No. 2, La leggierezza ==
La leggierezza (meaning "lightness") is the second étude. It is a monothematic piece in F minor with a very simple melodic line for each hand under an unusual Quasi allegretto tempo marking, usually ignored in favour of something slightly more frenetic. It starts with a fast but delicate sixteen chromatic-note arpeggio divided in thirds and sixths under an irregular rhythmic subdivision and cadenza so as to underline the atmosphere implied in its title. The technical difficulties involved in playing the piece include rapid leggiero chromatic runs, often with irregular rhythmic groupings, and passages in sixths and thirds. An ossia for the right hand involving brilliant runs in minor thirds is almost universally preferred by performers.

=== Alternate endings ===
La leggierezza often included an alternate ending written by Polish teacher Theodor Leschetizky. Two of his students, Ignacy Jan Paderewski and Benno Moiseiwitsch, performed and recorded this variation. The Paderewski recording includes the full "Leschetizky ending," while the recording by Moiseiwitsch includes his own abbreviated version of the Leschetizky ending. Simon Barere recorded the piece with an abbreviated version of the Leschetizky coda with critical results in the press.

== Étude No. 3, Un sospiro ==
Un sospiro
Performed by Jakob Gimpel

Un sospiro
Performed by Martha Goldstein on an 1851 Erard piano

The third of the Three Concert Études is in D♭ major, and is usually known as Un sospiro (Italian for "A sigh"). However, it is likely that the title did not originate with Liszt. Although there is no evidence that he actively attempted to remove the subtitle, none of the editions or subsequent printings of the Three Concert Études published by Kistner during Liszt's lifetime used them; he simply ignored such subtitles in later years, always referring to the piece by key.

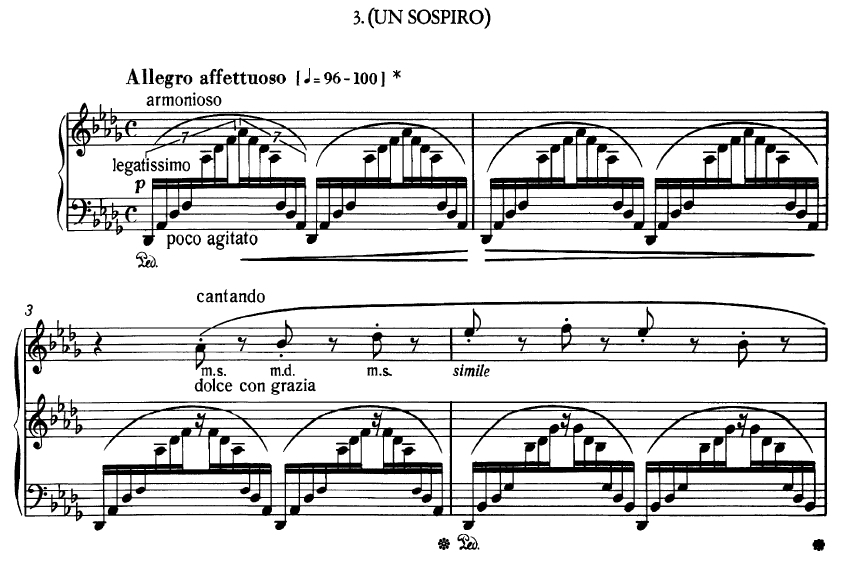
Opening of Un Sospiro

The étude is a study in crossing hands, playing a simple melody with alternating hands, and arpeggios. It is also a study in the way hands should affect the melody with its many accentuations, or phrasing with alternating hands. The melody is quite dramatic, almost impressionistic, radically changing in dynamics at times, and has inspired many listeners. Liszt kept the étude in his repertoire until his final years.

Un sospiro consists of a flowing background superimposed by a simple melody written in the third staff. This third staff—an additional treble staff—is written with the direction to the performer that notes with the stem up are for the right hand and notes with the stem down are for the left hand. The background alternates between the left and right hands in such a way that for most of the piece, while the left hand is playing the harmony, the right hand is playing the melody, and vice versa, with the left hand crossing over the right as it continues the melody for a short while before regressing again. There are also small cadenza sections requiring delicate fingerwork throughout the middle section of the piece.

Towards the end, after the main climax of the piece, both hands are needed to cross in an even more complex pattern. Since there are so many notes to be played rapidly and they are too far away from other clusters of notes that must be played as well, the hands are required to cross multiple times to reach dramatic notes near the end of the piece on the last page.

This étude, along with the other two concert études, was written in dedication to Liszt's uncle, Eduard Liszt (1817–1879), the youngest son of Liszt's grandfather and the stepbrother of his own father. Eduard handled Liszt's business affairs for more than thirty years until his death in 1879.

=== Recordings ===
Un Sospiro has been recorded by many well-known pianists including Van Cliburn, Jorge Bolet, Claudio Arrau, Marc-André Hamelin, Daniil Trifonov and Jan Lisiecki.

=== Use in film and television ===
The piece has appeared in a number of films and television series, including:

- The Andre de Toth film The Other Love (1947), in which it is played by Barbara Stanwyck's character
- The Paul Gordon film Concert Magic (1948)
- As the recurring musical theme in the Max Ophüls film Letter from an Unknown Woman (1948)
- As the main theme in the Liszt biopic Song Without End (1960)
- The Scott Hicks film Shine (1996), based on the life of David Helfgott
- The Jun Ichikawa film Zawa-zawa Shimo-Kitazawa (2000)
- The 2009 TV show Kings (in the pilot episode, twice)
- The 2011 film The Green Hornet, when the character Kato is playing the piano with Lenore on their first date
- The 2016 TV show "Easy" (in Season One, Episode 5, "Art and Life")
