= Bronislav Gimpel =

Polish-American violinist and teacher

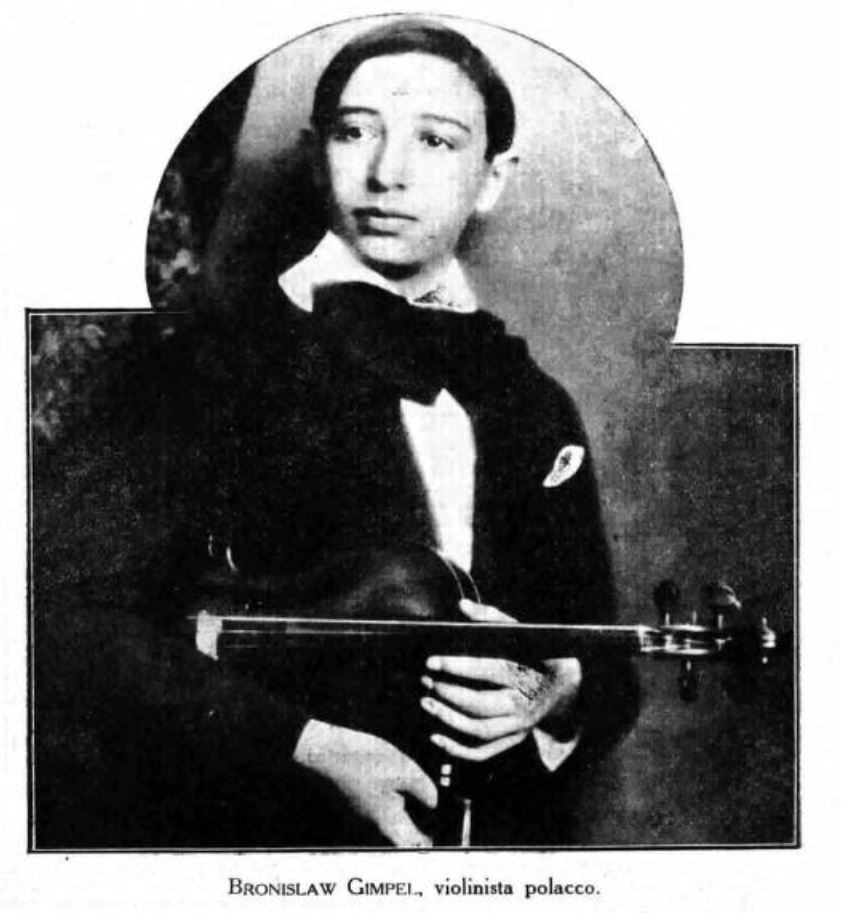
Photo of Bronislav Gimpel, aged 15 in 1926

Bronislav Gimpel (January 29, 1911 – May 1, 1979) was a Polish-American violinist, and teacher. He was born in Lemberg, Austria-Hungary, part of Polish Galicia (now Lviv, Ukraine), to a family of Jewish origin. Gimpel's grandfather, Yankev Ber Gimpel, created the Jewish Theatre in Lviv. Gimpel's father, Samuel, originally a clarinetist, also played violin and conducted the small theatre orchestra in which Bronislav played aged about eight. Gimpel's older brother, Jakob Gimpel, was a noted concert pianist who also recorded music for motion pictures. His oldest brother Carol was also a gifted pianist and accompanied Bronislav on his concert tour in Italy in 1926.

== Early career ==
Bronislav Gimpel started piano and violin lessons with his father at the age of five. At the age of eight, he studied with Maurycy Wolfsthal at the Lwów Conservatory. After 1922 he continued his studies with Robert Pollak at the Vienna Conservatory. 1925, at the age of fourteen, he played the Goldmark Concerto with the Vienna Symphony. A year later, an extended concert tour in Italy resulted in a succession of triumphs of historic proportion, with command performances before King Victor Emmanuel III of Italy and Pope Pius XI, and invitations to play on Paganini's famous Guarneri and to perform at the grave of the legendary virtuoso. Whilst touring Italy in June 1926, he was presented with a silver box inlaid with precious stones, with the inscription: From one infant prodigy to another. The box was gifted to him by Gabriele d'Annunzio and he also received a picture of the poet. D'Annunzio told Gimpel, Always love your art more than your notoriety. Tours of South America and Europe followed. In 1928/29 he attended the Berlin Hochschule für Musik under the guidance of Prof. Carl Flesch. Thereafter he continued his solo career while holding the lead posts in Königsberg and Gothenburg.

== Move to United States ==
Gimpel immigrated to the United States in 1937. On Otto Klemperer's initiative, he became concertmaster of the Los Angeles Philharmonic in July 1937. After serving in the U.S. Army from 1942 to the end of the war, Gimpel resumed his solo career in Europe, where he was received, once again, with great acclaim. In 1963, he and Władysław Szpilman formed "The Warsaw Piano Quintet". His recording of Dvorak's Violin Concerto is considered one of the best interpretations of this concerto.

== Teaching positions ==
In 1967 Gimpel accepted a professorship at the University of Connecticut, where he led the New England String Quartet. From 1973 Gimpel was a professor at the Royal Northern College of Music in Manchester, England. In this period he resumed his solo concert appearances in Europe, the United States and South America.

Gimpel died in Los Angeles at age 68.
