= Perpetuela =

Italian violin composition

Sonata a movimento perpetuo
- (Perpetuela)
- by Niccolò Paganini
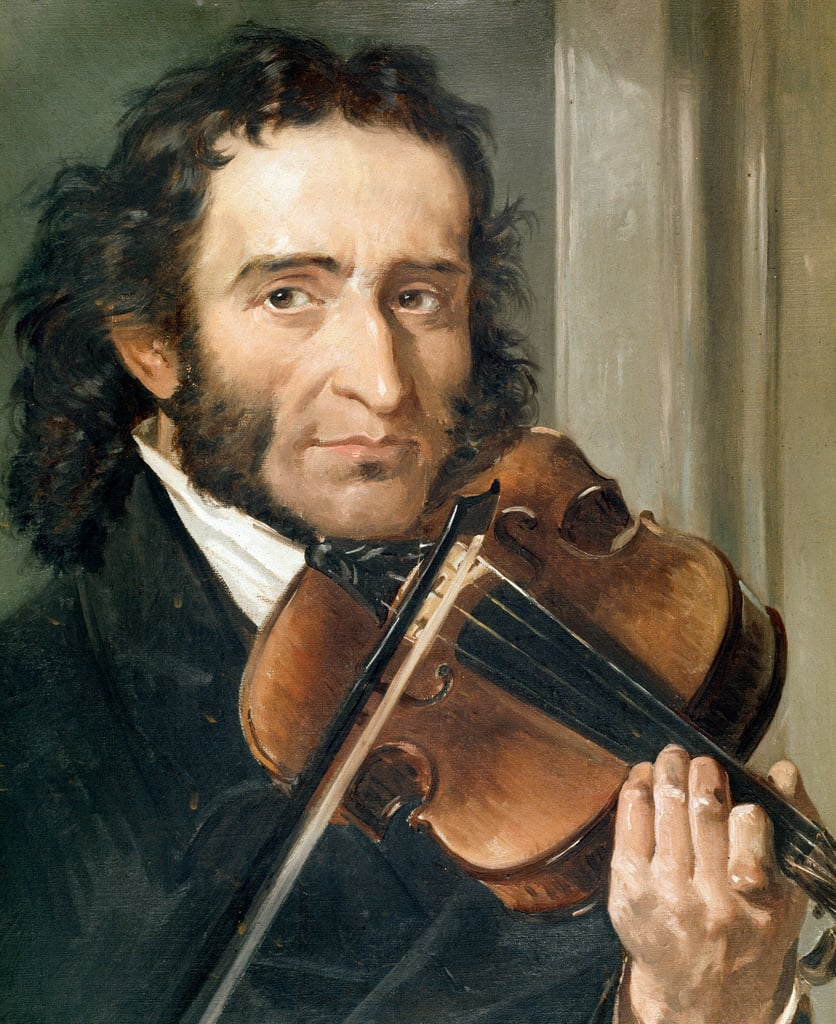
- Portrait of the composer
- Key: B♭ major
- Catalogue: MS 66
- Related: Quartet No. 11, MS 38; Quartet No. 14, MS 41
- Duration: Approx. 6 minutes
- Scoring: Violin and orchestra

Sonata a movimento perpetuo, MS 66 (from Italian, "Sonata in perpetual motion"), also commonly referred to as Perpetuela, is a composition for violin and orchestra by Italian violin virtuoso and composer Niccolò Paganini.

== Background ==
The Sonata a movimento perpetuo was most likely composed between 1831 and 1832, making it one of the last works written and performed by Niccolò Paganini. It is generally believed to have been premiered in Paris on June 1, 1832, a date recorded in one of the composer's autograph orchestral parts. The work was initially titled Larghetto and Finale, composed of semiquavers in perpetual motion. Concert programs indicate that it was performed at least twice more: on April 14, 1833, in Paris and on December 10, 1834, in Piacenza. Shortly thereafter, Paganini withdrew from the stage due to declining health and died a few years later, in 1840.

After Paganini's death, his son Achille Paganini delivered the manuscript material to the publisher Schonenberger with the intention of having it published posthumously. However, he mistakenly confused this work with another similarly titled composition, the Moto perpetuo, Op. 11, MS 72. Because the two works were bundled together and assigned continuous pagination, and since the material was neither complete nor homogeneous, the publisher issued only the available solo part. It was only much later that scholars determined that Achille had sent only the violin and guitar parts of Op. 11, supplemented with partial orchestral material from the Sonata a movimento perpetuo. A reliable reconstruction was only possible after additional manuscripts, unrelated to those catalogued by Achille, were identified.

The work was first published in 1916 as a reduction for violin and piano (with cello ad libitum). This edition included only the second section ("Moto perpetuo") and did not appear as an independent piece, but rather as an appendix to the catalogue of Georg Kinsky. The same arrangement was republished in 1922 by Universal Edition in Vienna, in N. Paganini, Movimento perpetuo, Ausgewählte Kompositionen. Both surviving versions were later published in full, in their original instrumentation, as appendices to the quartets included in the third volume of Edizione Nazionale delle opere di N. Paganini, edited by Anna Maria Monterosso Vacchelli, and issued in 1980 in Rome by the Istituto Italiano per la Storia della Musica.

All the surviving autographs are now preserved at the Biblioteca Casanatense in Rome, which include solo violin and orchestral parts of Version A, and the solo violin parts, orchestral parts, a full score and an orchestral reduction for piano of Version B. Paganini also famously wrote down on the viola manuscript part that he performed the "2272 notes in 3 minutes 1/20" (or three minutes and three seconds), at an average of around 12 notes a second.

== Structure ==
The Sonata a movimento perpetuo is effectively a reworked arrangement for violin and orchestra of the finale of the composer's Quartet No. 14 (MS 41), written for violin, viola, cello, and guitar. Two distinct versions exist. Both consist of the Perpetuela section preceded by an introductory movement, which differs between the two versions. Version A includes an introduction marked "Larghetto con passione," derived from the third movement of Quartet No. 11 (MS 38), transposed from F♯ minor to B♭ minor and expanded by four additional opening bars. Version B replaces this with a newly composed introduction marked "Andante amoroso," followed by the same second section as in Version A, here designated "Moto perpetuo."

The work is in B♭ major and has a total duration of approximately six minutes, with the Perpetuela section lasting around three minutes. The second section, a perpetuum mobile which only consists of sixteenth notes, is the best-known part of the piece. In order to facilitate extremely rapid passagework and position changing through the use of open strings, Paganini also used the common practice of scordatura, retuning the violin strings to suit the key of the piece. In this case, all strings are raised by a semitone (to A♭, E♭, B♭, and F). To avoid the use of scordatura in such a brief work, some editions transpose the piece directly to A major, and several performers have chosen to perform and record it in that key.

As many other compositions by Paganini, the title Sonata is not a description of the form of the piece. It is, in fact, a term that refers to a musical piece "to be played" (or "sounded"). The structure of the piece is as follows:

- Larghetto con passione (Version A) or Andante amoroso (Version B)
- Perpetuela (Version A) or Moto perpetuo (Version B). Allegro vivace

== Recordings ==
Because no single definitive version of the composition survives and significant discrepancies exist among published editions, recordings of the work are relatively scarce, and complete performances are particularly rare. Violinist Salvatore Accardo recorded the original orchestral version of the second section of the piece, albeit transposed to A major and performed without scordatura. He was accompanied by the London Symphony Orchestra under the direction of Charles Dutoit. The recording was made in January 1976 at Barking Town Hall and released shortly thereafter by Deutsche Grammophon. The complete composition (Version B) has also been recorded in Paganini's piano reduction by violinist Mario Hossen, with Nadja Hoebarth at the piano. This recording was made in 2017 and released by Dynamic.
