= Skete =

Type of monastic settlement

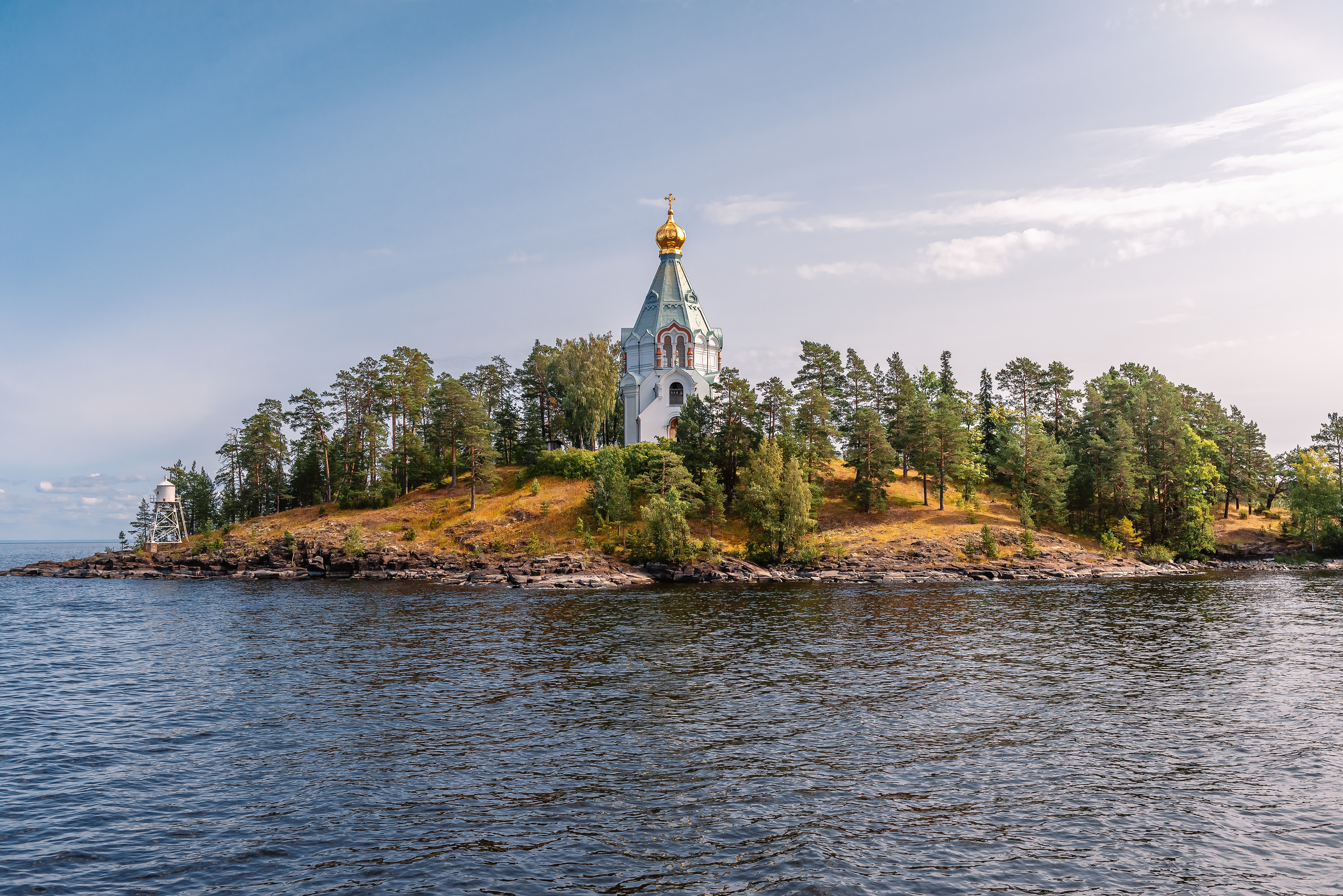
St Nicholas skete of the Valaam Monastery

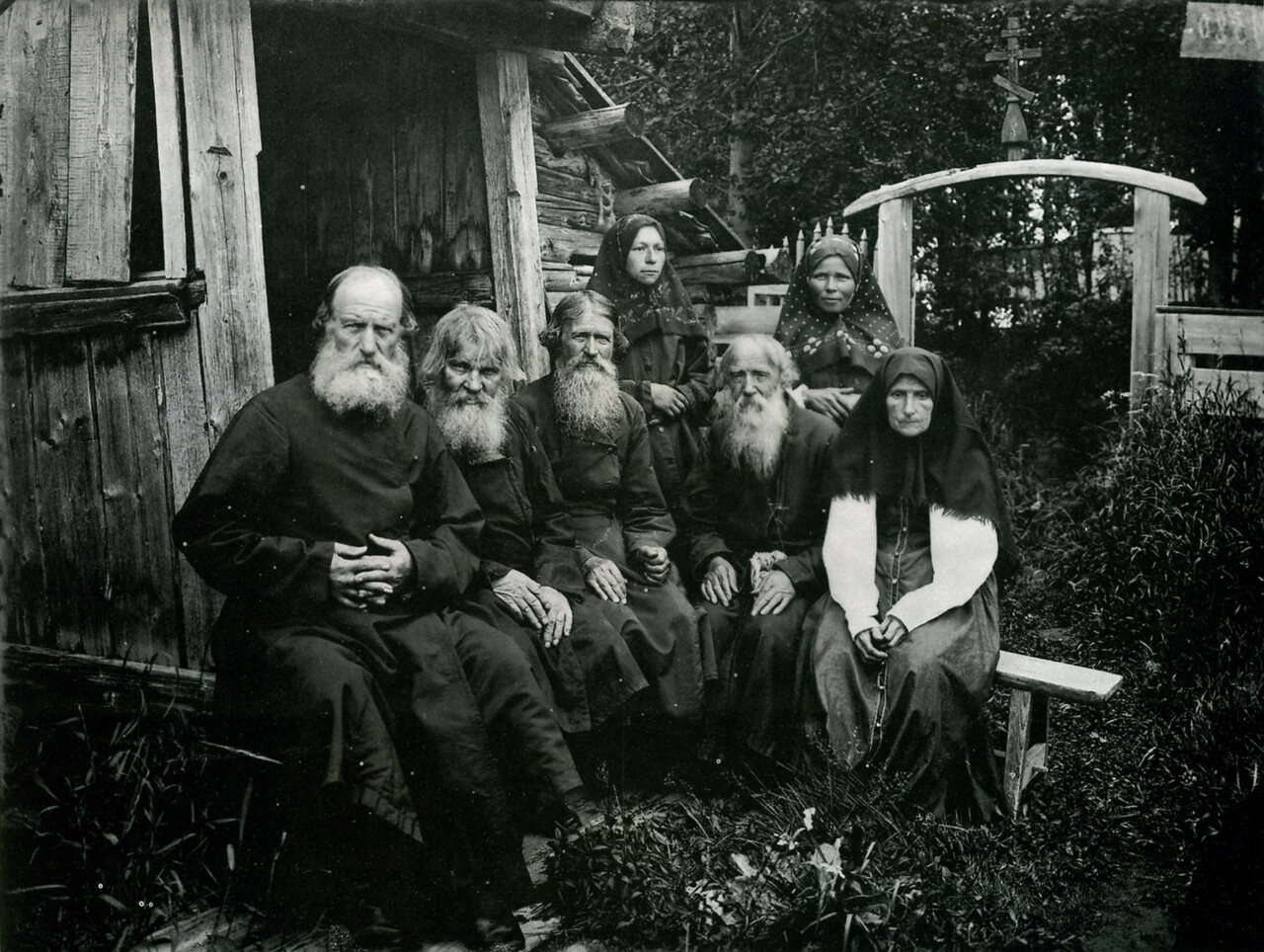
Russian Old Believers in the Sharpansky Skete (the Kerzhenets River Woods) in 1897

A skete (/ˈskiːt/) is a monastic community in Eastern Christianity that allows relative isolation for monks, but also allows for communal services and the safety of shared resources and protection. It is one of four types of early monastic orders, along with the eremitic, lavritic and coenobitic, that became popular during the early formation of the Christian Church.

Skete communities usually consist of a number of small cells or caves that act as the living quarters with a centralized church or chapel. These communities are thought of as a bridge between strict eremitic lifestyle and communal lifestyles since it was a blend of the two. They were a direct response to the ascetic lifestyle that early Christians aspired to live. Skete communities were often a bridge to a stricter form of hermitage or to martyrdom.

The Greek term skete (σκήτη, skḗtē, skiti) is most likely a reference to the Scetis valley in Egypt (Greek Σκήτις, from its Coptic name Ϣⲓϩⲏⲧ, Šihēt), where this type of monastic community first appears. A few scholars have argued that it instead is a stylized spelling of the word ἀσκητής (askētḗs "ascetic").

== Early history ==
The earliest monks were men who fled civilization to lead an ascetic lifestyle alone in the desert. Early desert ascetics have been chronicled as far back as the writings of Eusebius. In his book Church History or Ecclesiastical History, he writes of early desert fathers who left civilization behind to wander the desert, eventually drawing a following and settling down into monastic communities. The problem with these earliest writings is that no distinction is made between those who fled civilization for ascetic reasons, and those who fled to avoid persecution. Another problem is that early accounts of monastic life are greatly exaggerated, leading some scholars to calculate that if these reports were taken at face value the monasteries were larger than the entire populations of the countries where they were founded. The only thing that is absolutely certain from these early writings is that some early religious figures did flee to the seclusion of the desert while others had a legitimate calling.

Whether fleeing persecution or fleeing civilization, the monks who retreated to the Scetis valley in Egypt eventually began to draw followers. The inherent problem with attracting followers is that it defeated the original goal of seeking solitude. Early communities began forming, with the monks building small one- or two-room cells or occupying caves. Eventually, these small communities would draw more people, leading to the need for a simple, communal infrastructure. The monks would work together to build a church, then retreat to the solitude of their cells or caves to embrace the (at least partial) hermetic and ascetic lifestyle. After building a communal church they could gather for the weekly liturgy or Eucharist.

== Locations of the earliest Skete monasteries ==
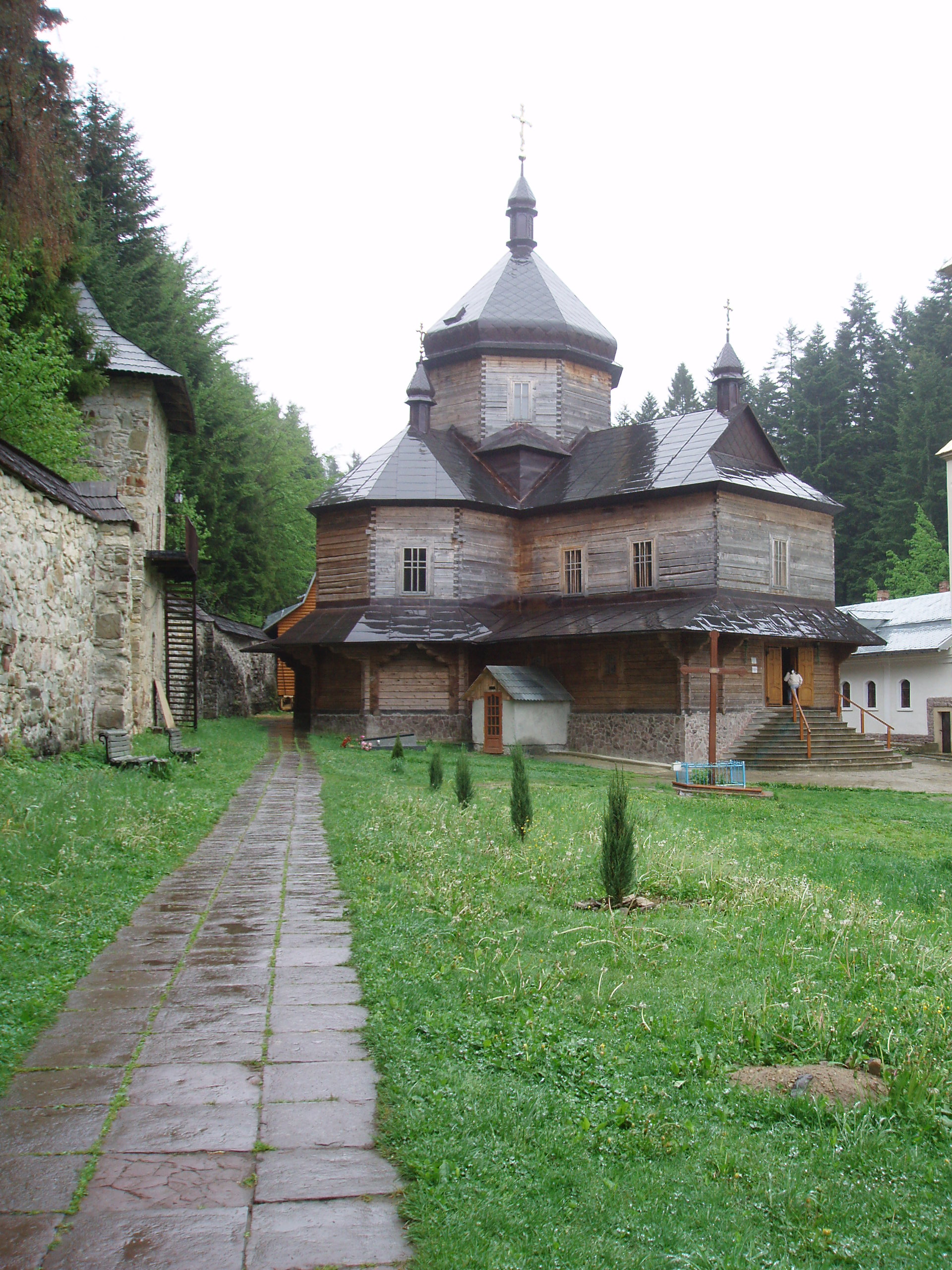
Maniava Skete in the wilderness of the Carpathian mountains in west Ukraine

The Scetis Valley in Egypt, now known as the Wadi al-Natrun, is 22 miles (35 km) long and lies west of the Nile River in the Libyan Desert. The name Scetis comes from the Coptic word Shi-het, meaning “to weigh the heart”. The valley lies slightly below sea level and is dotted with oases and marshes. Despite the low elevation and water resources, the Scetis Valley was a dangerous place; early writings are replete with travelers who went astray and died trying to cross it.

The monasteries of the Scetis Valley were not like the large centralized communities that would come to define monasteries in the Middle Ages. Instead, the Scetis monasteries were a collection of hermits who for the most part lived separately, each in his own cell, but who would come together for weekly prayers and holy days. These small cells could be close together or widely scattered, making their exact locations hard to find. Later, when major buildings were erected, the cells associated with them were relatively easy to find, but the locations of the earliest cells became even harder to know with certainty. Modern scholars now estimate the most famous of these monasteries, the Monastery of Saint Macarius the Great, to be roughly 92 kilometres (57 miles) northwest of Cairo.

== Notable early Skete leader Saint Macarius ==
Saint Macarius was born into a middle-class family in Upper Egypt around the year 300. As a boy, he accompanied his father, a camel driver and merchant, on desert excursions and came to know the Scetis Valley. When his parents arranged a marriage for him, he feigned an illness and retreated to the desert to decide what to do. When he returned, he found that his fiancée had died. Following the death of his parents soon after that, he gave all his money to the poor.

When the bishop of Ashmoun became aware of Macarius' piety, he ordained him a priest. Later, Macarius was accused by a village woman of impregnating her. He did not defend himself, but the woman had a difficult labor and did not deliver until she confessed that Macarius was not the father. Following this incident, he fled to the Scetis Valley to live as a desert hermit.

Soon, he began to attract followers. He sought the advice of Saint Anthony, who inspired him to become a teacher and to found a monastic community. That monastic community reflected Macarius's own thoughts on the need for solitude and contemplation and allowed monks to live for the most part separated from one another, coming together when needed for Mass on the weekends and in times of trouble.

He was exiled by Emperor Valens to an island in the River Nile over a dispute about the Nicene Creed. The exile was short-lived, and he returned to his monastery where he lived until the time of his death in 391. After his death his body was stolen and brought to his home village of Shabsheer, but his remains were later taken back to the Monastery of Saint Macarius in the Scetis Valley where they remain to this day.

== Daily life in early Skete monasteries ==
The Skete monastery system is thought of as a middle path of monastic life because it is a middle ground between extreme isolation that is exemplified by the anchorite eremitic lifestyle, and it is less communal than coenobitic monastic system.

In the early days of the Skete monasteries there was usually a central house for communion and weekend Mass, but the monks did not live there. Instead they lived in small cells, constructed by themselves or by a communal effort with one monk bringing bricks, another mortar, another bringing water and so forth. Such a building would usually consist of two rooms, a front room for work, sleep, and receiving visitors, and another room for prayer and contemplation. An early church leader complained that some monks built larger than necessary cells, some as big as four or five rooms. Saint Macarius' cell was said to be two small rooms, but it was rumored he had a small tunnel dug in the back that led to a cave where he could escape from the throngs that came to visit him. Another style of cell was to dig into the sides of rock walls to create small two-room caves. These dwellings resembled the cave dwellings of the Pueblo Indians. Still others would be simple huts of mud and brick built against cliff walls so the back room was the side of the cliff. The high walls and complex buildings that look more like fortresses than monasteries came much later.

The furnishings for some of these simple cells would consist of a mat and sometimes a simple woven stool called an embrimia. Some would have doors and shelves for storing books or valuables. By day the monk would do his day labor in the front chamber sitting on his mat, and at night he would pray on his embrimia, and perhaps use it as a pillow. The vast majority were simple one- and two-room cells with the humblest of possessions inside.

Daily life during the week consisted of each monk working and praying. It is difficult to be exact as to what sort of daily routine was most common because it seems the monks had some freedom in choosing how to spend their time during the week, and also because almost all monks worked and sometimes these day jobs would be seasonal, or occasionally make it necessary to meet with merchants (i.e., basket weaving or rope making). Typically a monk would wake at midnight (approximately) and pray the night office, then meditate till dawn. He did not recite the rest of the offices of the day but instead performed his manual labor while meditating, mixing the menial with the spiritual. During the ninth hour (after sunrise) a monk would eat his one meal of the day, which usually consisted of two small loaves of bread called paxamatia which together were often less than one pound. These loaves could be stored for long stretches of time. They could be soaked in water to be made softer and seasoned for taste, but few monks had access to resources beyond a bit of salt and perhaps occasionally olive oil. Records show there were some vegetables such as beans and lentils and even occasionally grapes and fruit, but these were usually reserved for guests or for sick monks in need. Even though this diet seems strict in the extreme, it is not terribly different from what the average Egyptian ate. At sunset a monk would celebrate vespers and would go to sleep shortly after sunset. This cycle was only disturbed for holy days, weekend Mass, and if his manual labor made change necessary.

On Saturday and Sunday, the monks would gather at their communal church. At these gatherings, the monks would pray together, with one monk leading and the rest chanting back the offices of the day. Next would be a reading from the New Testament and possibly additional readings. The monks would celebrate the Eucharist on both Saturday and Sunday. The time of the Saturday Eucharist is not clear but on Sundays it occurred at the third hour (after sunrise). Sunday was also the occasion of the communal agape meal, where monks shared bread, wine, and their one cooked meal of the week. These gatherings were a time for social interaction and connection with their fellow monks. At the end of the meal they would pick up their supplies for the week, including food and materials needed for their day labor and return to their cells.

=== Political hierarchy ===
Because of the nature of the Skete-style monastic system political hierarchy in the earliest days the monasteries were not necessary. Most monks worked and prayed alone all week and only gathered on the weekends for group prayers and the Eucharist. New monks would often attach themselves to older monks (called an Abba) to learn the basics of monastic life and if needed a skill for their day job such as basket weaving or rope making. Some monks would gather a large cluster of monks around him as his disciples. How these small groups worked is unknown but many disciples followed their leader monks until they died.

After the death of Macarius in 390, four distinct congregations formed in the Scetis Valley. These four congregations had their own church, kitchen and served the monks living in the cells around these central structures. These congregations had their own monk priests who were in charge of the weekly Eucharist and in organizing the new monks as they joined the community.

For larger matters some of these congregations formed councils that acted in judicial matters even wielding the power of excommunication in extreme cases. Eventually these monk priests would become known as a “Father of Scetis”. These men would be responsible for their congregations and it would become customary for them to report to the patriarch of Alexandria.

=== Economies of the early Skete communities ===
Monks labored almost continually in their small cells both to make money for the monastery and as a type of daily meditation. Two of the most common skills employed by the monks were rope making and basket weaving. Even Macarius the Great, founder of Egyptian monasticism, was a skilled basket weaver who trained other monks how to weave. These two jobs were prevalent because there were numerous marshes around the Scetis valley to provide the raw materials. The monks would either take their finished products to the church on the weekends to be sold, or sell them to camel caravans when they passed by their cells. The Apophthegmata Patrum mentions other jobs monks carried out such as copyists. Many monks, including early church leaders such as Macarius the Great and John the Dwarf, worked as day laborers at local farms during the harvest season. These labors served two purposes. They provided the monks with the means for survival in the desert where food and supplies are not easily available, and they were also a kind of manual meditation that gave the monks time to both work and reflect on the Scriptures.

== Church controversies in early Skete communities ==
The early church was fraught with controversies that bitterly divided many cities and even congregations. The earliest monasteries of the Scetis Valley predated many of these early church schisms and because of their isolation and because most of the monks spent so much time in isolation, these church problems were slow to affect them. For example, during the great persecution of Christians under Emperor Decius, many early Christians fled to the desert to the monasteries; the long arm of Rome did not extend very deeply into the Scetis Valley. The creation of martyrs during this time influenced the way the Skete monks were perceived because the extreme asceticism of the lifestyle led many to believe the monks to be living martyrs.

Later, during what would become known as the Melitian Schism when the church became divided in Alexandria over who was the rightful bishop, local monasteries around Alexandria would choose sides and enter the fray, but Scetis monasteries only mentioned the problems in passing. The isolation of the desert and that of the monks themselves kept many of the bitterest church controversies at bay.

As mentioned earlier, Saint Macarius was briefly exiled to an island in the Nile river over a disagreement concerning the Nicene Creed, but the exile was short-lived and he soon returned to his monastery.

== Development ==
The Skete monastic style of monasticism fell out of favor with the church at the beginning of the Middle Ages. This was due mostly to the need for relative physical safety that more traditional cenobite communities offered. Skete monasteries still exist, and the monastery of Saint Macarius the Great still stands and has a thriving Skete community.

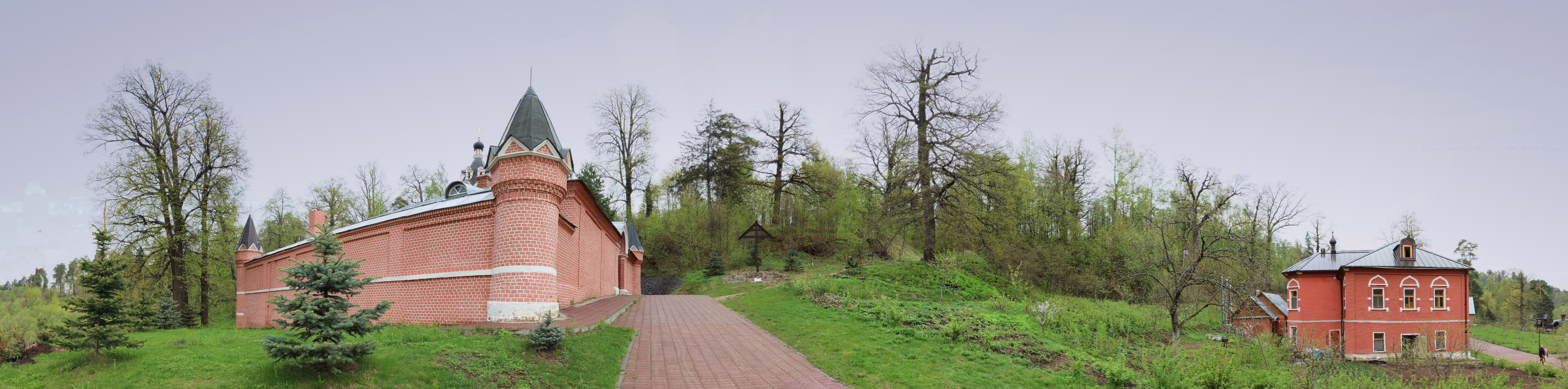
Skete of the Savvino-Storozhevsky Monastery and its surroundings. The skete was established in 1862 approximately 1 kilometre (0.62 mi) away from the monastery.

== See also ==
- Desert Fathers
- Mount Athos
- Wadi El Natrun
- Monastic cell
- Hermitage (religious retreat)
