= Ivan Vyshenskyi =

Ukrainian monk and philosopher (1550-1620)

- Іван Вишенський
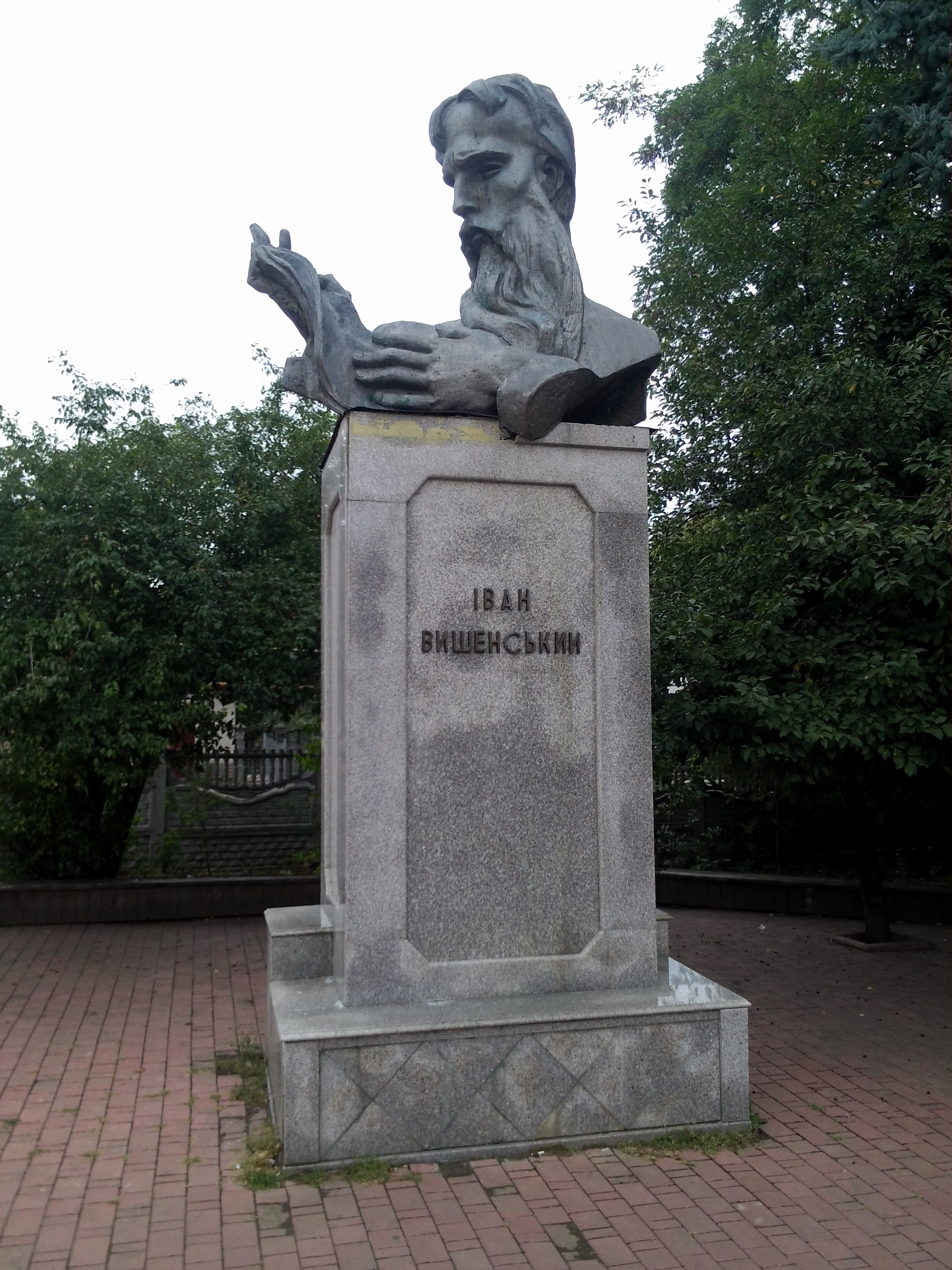
- A monument to Vyshenskyi in Sudova Vyshnia

Personal life
- Born: 1550 Sudova Vyshnia
- Died: 1620 (aged 69–70) Mount Athos, Greece
- Known for: Monk and religious philosopher

Religious life
- Religion: Christianity
- Denomination: Orthodox

Ivan Vyshenskyi (Ukrainian: Іван Вишенський; born ca. 1550 in Sudova Vyshnia – after 1620, Mount Athos, Greece) was a Ukrainian Orthodox monk and religious philosopher. He is considered to be an important polemicist of the time.

== Biography ==
Not much is known about the life of Vyshenskyi. It is considered to be likely that he spent part of his youth in Lutsk and was connected with scholars from the Ostroh Academy. Within the years 1576–1580 he traveled to Mount Athos in Greece, which was the center of Orthodox monk culture. He stayed there until his death, with the exception of a short visit to Ukraine between 1604 and 1606 when he quarreled with members of the Lviv Brotherhood.

== Views ==
Being opposed to Catholicism and the Union of Brest, Vyshenskyi adopted the positions of Byzantine asceticism and condemned the entire contemporary order of the church and society. He saw the original Christian brotherhood as a way of establishing God's Kingdom on Earth. Vyshenskyi opposed secular education and viewed folk traditions as pagan. His works combined the elements of epistle, dialogue and polemic treatise and juxtaposed the images of moral decay embodied by the upper classes with the poverty of their common subjects and monks.

== Work ==
In his writings, Vyshenskyi opposed Catholicism and the Uniate Church. He sent messages arguing his position from Mount Athos. Vyshenskyi was especially polemic in his communications with Piotr Skarga, who supported church union. His arguments were based on opposition to the church hierarchy of Catholicism and to Byzantine asceticism. Vyshenskyi wrote not in the common Church Slavonic language, but in the Ruthenian language, an older form of Ukrainian.

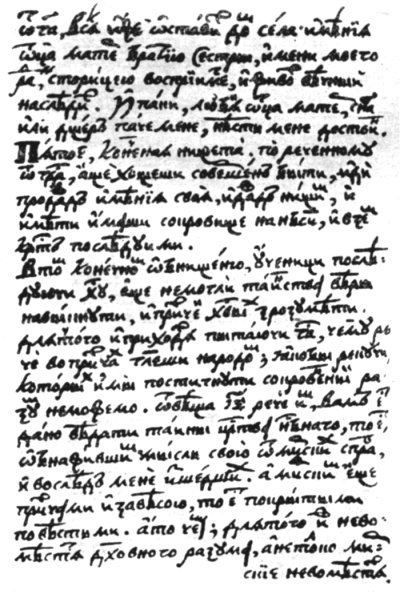
Vyshenskyi's manuscript of one of his works

=== List of works ===
In total, 16 works by Vyshenskyi are known:

- Epistle of the Holy Mountain monks to K. Ostrozky and the Orthodox community (1598), printed is the Ostroh Little Book (Книжица);
- Manuscript collection (c. 1600) including two works written before 1596: A Short Message (ИзвЂщеніе краткое), Common Writing to All Living in the Lechite Land (Писаніе до всЂхъ обще, въ Лядской земли живущихъ); as well as an appeal to prince Ostrozky and the bishops, Exposure of Devil the World-Ruler (Обличение диавола-миродержца), Advice (Порада), A Riddle for Latin Philosophers (Загадка философомъ латинскимъ), Short Trace (СлЂдъ краткий) and others;
- A Short-Worded Answer (Краткословный отвЂтъ) to Piotr Skarga (1600-1601);
- An Epistle to Domnicia (Посланіє Домнікії), Univ Lavra (1605);
- A Dispute of a Wise Latin with a Stupid Ruthenian (Зачапка мудраго латынника зъ глупымъ русиномъ, c. 1609);
- A Mental Spectacle (Позорище мысленное, 1615-1616).

=== Style ===
Emotional excitement in Vyshenskyi's texts goes hand-to-hand with sharp satire, irony and sarcasm. The use of folk language, presence of numerous epithets, comparisons, appeals and richness of vocabulary contributed to the brightness and dramaticism of his works. Vyshenskyi's literary style is rooted in the Byzantine sermon tradition, but also demonstrates many commonalities with contemporary polemists from the Ostroh circle, as wel las with works of Piotr Skarga and Mikołaj Rej. Dmytro Chyzhevsky recognized Vyshenskyi's works as being close to the best examples of Baroque style.

== Legacy ==
Vyshenskyi's works were republished during the second half of the 19th century and became an object of studies by Ivan Franko, who in 1900 dedicated one of his poems to their author. Among other scholars who studied Vyshenskyi's texts were Ahatanhel Krymsky, Mykola Sumtsov, Mykhailo Hrushevsky, Mykhailo Vozniak, Dmytro Chyzhevsky and Igor Yeryomin.
