= Jakob Gimpel =

Polish-American concert pianist and educator (1906 - 1989)

Gimpel performing Franz Liszt's Concert Etude No. 3 (Un sospiro)

Jakob Gimpel (April 16, 1906 – March 12, 1989) was a Polish-American concert pianist and educator.

Jakob Gimpel was born in Lwów (then in Polish Galicia, part of Austria Hungary, and now Lviv, Ukraine) to a Jewish family. Gimpel's younger brother, Bronislav Gimpel, was a noted concert violinist, and his older brother, Karol Gimpel, was a pianist and conductor.

== Performing career ==
Gimpel began his piano studies with his father, Adolph, and later studied piano with Cornelia Tarnowska and Eduard Steuermann, and music theory with Alban Berg. Gimpel made his debut in Vienna, Austria, in 1923, with the Concertgebouw Orchestra, conducted by Pierre Monteux, performing Rachmaninoff's 2nd Piano Concerto. The concert launched an extensive European tour which saw Gimpel perform as many as 80 concerts in a single country.

Gimpel toured with violinists Bronisław Huberman, Erika Morini, Nathan Milstein, and his brother, Bronislav Gimpel. In 1937, Gimpel helped Huberman found the Palestine Symphony Orchestra, now the Israel Philharmonic Orchestra. Gimpel migrated to New York City in 1938 and later moved to Los Angeles.

== Film credits ==
Gimpel played frequently with the MGM orchestra. With the exception of a performance of Liszt's E-Flat Concerto in the 1943 thriller Above Suspicion, he was not specifically credited for most of his performances. Among Gimpel's noted film credits are recorded appearances in Gaslight, Possessed, Letter from an Unknown Woman, Strange Fascination, Harlow, The Big Combo, The Story of Three Loves, Planet of the Apes, and The Mephisto Waltz. Gimpel also recorded music for two classic cartoons: the Bugs Bunny short Rhapsody Rabbit and the academy-Award-winning Tom and Jerry short Johann Mouse.

== Later years and honors ==
Gimpel was one of the first European-American artists to return to Europe after World War II; he played hundreds of concerts in West Germany in 1954. From 1971 to 1986, Gimpel was professor in residence at California State University, Northridge (CSUN). He was awarded the West German Order of Merit, First Class, and, in 1975, the Ben-Gurion Award from the State of Israel.

On May 9, 1979, Gimpel was scheduled to give a joint recital in Los Angeles with his brother Bronislav Gimpel. Bronislav died unexpectedly several days before the performance and Jakob played a solo recital in memory of his brother.

== Filmography ==
| Year | Title | Role | Notes |
|---|---|---|---|
| 1944 | Gaslight | Pianist | |
| 1947 | Possessed | Pianist | |
| 1952 | Strange Fascination | Pianist | |
| 1953 | Johann Mouse (short) | Pianist | |
| 1955 | The Big Combo | Pianist | |
| 1965 | Harlow | Pianist | |
| 1971 | The Mephisto Waltz | Pianist | |
