= August 7 (Eastern Orthodox liturgics) =

Day in the Eastern Orthodox liturgical calendar

Eastern Orthodox liturgical calendar
August 6	August 7	August 8
August 7 O.S. ≍ August 20 N.S. August 7 N.S ≍ July 25 O.S.

An Eastern Orthodox cross

August 7 in Eastern Orthodox liturgical calendars is a feast day and a day of commemoration of saints and martyrs. Although some Orthodox churches use the Revised Julian Calendar and others use the traditional Julian calendar, the fixed commemorations for their respective August 7 are broadly the same, no matter which calendar is used. (Note: Despite the dates being the same, the days to which they refer typically differ by 13 days. The notation Old Style or O.S. is sometimes used to indicate a date in the traditional Julian Calendar (the "Old Calendar"). The notation New Style or N.S. indicates a date in the Revised Julian calendar (the "New Calendar").)

== Feasts ==
- Afterfeast of the Transfiguration of Our Lord, God, and Savior Jesus Christ. (Note: On the first day of the Afterfeast of the Transfiguration, the hymns of Vespers speak of the amazement of the Apostles when they saw Christ transfigured before them. The Savior’s equality with the Father is also stressed, for He who covers Himself with light as with a garment is now transfigured before His disciples, "shining more brightly than the sun.")

== Saints ==
- Venerable Candida the Byzantine
- Hieromartyr Narcissus, Bishop of Jerusalem (c. 213) (Note: He reposed in peace at the age of 116 years.)
- Martyrs Marinus the Soldier (see also: March 17) and Asterius the Senator, (Note: In most sources he is referred to as a "martyr and senator (palatine), killed by the sword". In the Synaxarion of Saint Nicodemus he is referred to as a "Venerable Martyr and Wonderworker." Name days celebrated today include: Asterios (Ἀστέριος); Astero (Ἀστέρω),) at Caesarea in Palestine (260)
- Martyr Dometius of Persia and his two disciples (363)
- Venerable Or (Horus) of the Thebaid (390)
- Virginmartyr Potamia of Alexandria, the Wonderworker, by the sword (4th century)
- Venerable Hyperechius of the "Paradise", Egypt (4th century)
- Saint Vardan the Martyr, of Armenia (451) (Note: His commemoration day in the official Armenian Church calendar is a moving feast day, usually in the month of February.)
- Saint Irene of Athens, Byzantine empress regnant and a strong iconodule (803) (see also: August 9)
- Venerable Theodosius the New, of the Peloponnese, the healer (862)
- The Venerable 10,000 Ascetics of the Thebaid, reposed in peace
- Saint Sozon of Nicomedia (Note: He was cast into the fire to be martyred, but he emerged miraculously unharmed. Subsequently he reposed in peace.)
- Saint Hierotheus of Hungary (10th century)
- Saint Stephen of Hungary, king (1038)

== Pre-Schism Western saints ==
- Saint Faustus, a soldier martyred in Milan in Italy under Commodus (c. 190)
- Hieromartyr Sixtus II (Xystus), Pope of Rome, martyred with his deacons [Felicissim and Agapit] (258) (Note: Born in Athens in Greece, this Pope was martyred. While celebrating the liturgy in the catacomb of Praetextatus in Rome, he was arrested together with his deacons Felicissimus, Agapitus, Januarius, Magnus, Vincent and Stephen. All of them were martyred and later the seventh deacon St Laurence followed them.) (see also: August 10 - in the East)
- Saints Peter, Julian (Juliana) and Companions, a group of twenty or more martyrs in Rome under Valerian and Gallienus (c. 260)
- Saint Carpophorus, Exanthus, Cassius, Severinus, Secundus and Licinius, soldiers martyred in Como in the north of Italy under Maximian Herculius (c. 295)
- Saint Afra, martyred during the Diocletian persecution (304)
- Saint Donatian, second Bishop of Châlons-sur-Marne in France (4th century)
- Saints Donatus, second Bishop of Arezzo in Italy, and Hilarinus, a martyr in Ostia (4th century) (Note: "At Arezzo, in Tuscany, the birthday of St. Donatus, bishop and martyr, who among other miraculous deeds, made whole again by his prayers (as is related by the blessed pope Gregory), a sacred chalice which had been broken by Pagans. Being apprehended by the imperial officer Quadratian, in the persecution of Julian the Apostate, and refusing to sacrifice to idols, he was struck with the sword, and thus consummated his martyrdom. With him suffered also the blessed monk Hilarinus, whose feast is celebrated on the 16th of July, when his body was taken to Ostia.")
- Saint Victricius of Rouen, former army officer, became missionary in the north of France, and Bishop of Rouen, Confessor (407) (Note: "At Rouen, the holy bishop St. Victricius. Whilst he was yet a soldier under Julian, he threw away his military belt for Christ, and after being subjected by the tribune to many torments, was condemned to capital punishment. But the executioner who had been sent to put him to death being struck blind, and the confessor's chains being loosened, he made his escape. Afterwards being made bishop, by preaching the word of God, he brought to the faith of Christ the barbarous people of Belgic Gaul, and finally died a confessor in peace.")
- Saint Donatus, Bishop of Besançon (c. 660) (Note: A monk at Luxeuil in France, he became Bishop of Besançon in 624. He did much to encourage monasticism and founded a monastery dedicated to St Paul in Besançon.)
- Saint Donat (Dunwyd), patron saint of St Donat's or Llandunwyd in Glamorgan in Wales

== Post-Schism Orthodox saints ==
- Venerable Pimen the Much-ailing (Poemen), of the Kiev Caves (1110)
- Venerable Pimen the Faster, of the Far Caves in Kiev (c. 1141)
- Saint Mikallos of Akanthou in Cyprus, one of the "300 Allemagne Saints" in Cyprus (12th century) (Note: The "300 Allemagne Saints" ((in Greek): τριακοσίων Μαρτύρων καὶ Ὁσίων τῆς Κύπρου; or, ἐκ Παλαιστίνης ἐλθόντων εἰς Κύπρον τριακοσίων) came to Cyprus from Palestine, and lived as ascetics in various parts of the island. Included among the "300 Allemagne Saints" are: Venerable Anastasios the Wonderwoker of Cyprus, September 17; Venerable Abbacum the Ascetic of Cyprus, Wonderworker, December 2; Venerable Cassian the Martyr (Kassianos), December 4; Venerable Calantius of Tamassos (Kalandios), April 26; Martyr Constantine of Cyprus (Constantine of Allemagne), Wonderworker, July 1; According to some of their lives in the Great Synaxaristes, after the dissolution of the Second Crusade (1147 - 1149), they decided to live the monastic life in the Jordan desert. However since the Latins there disturbed them, they relocated to Cyprus and dispersed over the island.)
- Saint Mercurius of the Near Caves in Kiev, Bishop of Smolensk (1239)
- Saint Agathon the Ktetor of Athos (14th century)
- Venerable Nicanor the Wonderworker of Mt. Callistratus (1419 or 1549)
- Venerable David of Euboea, Wonderworker (c. 1589) (Note: His feast day falls on August 6th, but since it coincides with the Feast of the Transfiguration, he is usually commemorated on August 7th. He is also commemorated on November 1st.) (Church of Greece; see also: November 1)
- Venerable Dometius of Philotheou Monastery on Mount Athos, the "standard-bearer", and wonderworker (16th century)
- Saint Theodora of Sihla (18th century) (Note: Soon after her marriage, both she and her husband asked for a blessing to enter into monasticism. She was tonsured at Vărzărești Skete and later labored in asceticism in the Sihla forest in the mountains of central Romania.)
- Saint Pârvu Mutu, painter (1735)
- Saint Olimpiada (Strigalova) of Arzamas, schemanun (1828)
- Venerable Anthony of Optina, Schema-Abbot, Elder of Optina Monastery (1865)
- Venerable Joseph 'Gerontogiannis', monk of Kapsa Monastery on Crete (1874) (Note: His relics were translated on May 7, 1982.) (Note: Ioannis Vintsentzos was born at the village of Lithines, Sitia, at the chapel of Kapsa in 1799, when his parents, Emmauel and Zambia Vintsentzos had gone there to pay their respects to St. John the Baptist. The boy was baptised a few years later in the same chapel and was given the name Ioannis. As soon as he reached adulthood, he married a pious young maiden from his village. Their marriage was officiated at the Monastery of St. John the Baptist, which was in ruins. The surname 'Gerontogiannis' was attributed to the Saint by the family of his wife. Ioannis and his wife lived happily at the village of Lithines and devoted themselves to the upbringing of their children. On Easter Friday 1841 Ioannis fell in a deep sleep and all efforts to wake him up failed. Forty-three hours later Ioannis woke up to find his family and a number of friends at his bed side. He then related to them his experience during his short hibernation. He said that he had been taken up to heaven where he saw and heard things wonderful which cannot be put into words. Later Ioannis shared his experience with the bishop of Ierapetra and with the local commander. Taking his vision as a sign from God, Ioannis decided to leave his family and village and devote himself completely to God. As a place of asceticism, he chose his birthplace, where he was also baptized and got married. He was ordained monk and named Joseph. He practiced abstinence and penance. At the same time, he refurbished two cells of the local monastery to accommodate visitors, while he lived in a cave located over the monastery, on a steep slope in the gorge of Pervolakia. He lived there for 17 years, during which time novice monks and laymen consulted him. Owing to his fame and virtuous life he received an invitation by the head of the Monastery of Agia Sophia at Armenous to reconstruct of the monastic complex, which he rebuilt entirely from the ruins. The reconstruction work lasted five years (1866-1870). In 1870, the Saint returned to his hermitage where he died four years later, on August 6, 1874, at the age of 75. On May 7, 1982, there was a panegyric removal of the Saint's relics following an all-night vigil celebrated by the Metropolitan of Ierapythis and Siteias Kyros Filotheos, with Bishop Methodios Petrakis and clerics and a large congregation.)

=== New martyrs and confessors ===
- New Hieromartyr Alexander Hotovitzky, Priest of New York and Protopresbyter of Moscow, Missionary of America, Hieromartyr of the Bolshevik yoke (1937) (see also: November 21, December 4)
- New Hieromartyrs Peter Tokarev, Michael Plyshevsky, John Vorontsov, Demetrius Milovidov, and Alexius Vorobyov, Priests (1937)
- New Hieromartyr Athanasius (Yegorov), Abbot, of Izmailovo (Moscow) (1937)
- New Hieromartyr Eliseus Schtolder, Deacon (1937)
- New Hieromartyr Basil Amenitsky, Priest (1938)

== Other commemorations ==
- Commemoration of the First Siege of Constantinople (Saving of Constantinople from the Persians and Avars) (626) (Note: This commemoration is preserved in several codices, in particular the Lavriotiko Codex I 73. Note, that the Akathist Hymn (Chairetismoi) to the Virgin Mary was written after Constantinople was liberated from this siege of 80,000 Avars, Slavs and the Persian fleet.)
- Uncovering of the relics (1832) of Saint Metrophanes of Voronezh (Macarius in schema), Bishop of Voronezh, the first bishop there (1703)
- Synaxis of the Saints of Valaam Monastery
- Trigorsk Icon of the Mother of God
- Valaam Icon of the Mother of God
- Repose of Elder Adrian of South Dorotheus Monastery (1853)
- Repose of Schemamonk John the Silent (John the Blind), of Valaam Monastery (1894)
- Repose of Elder Callinicus the Hesychast, of Katounakia, Mount Athos (1930)
- Repose of Archimandrite Vladimir of Jordanville Monastery, New York (1988)

== Icon gallery ==
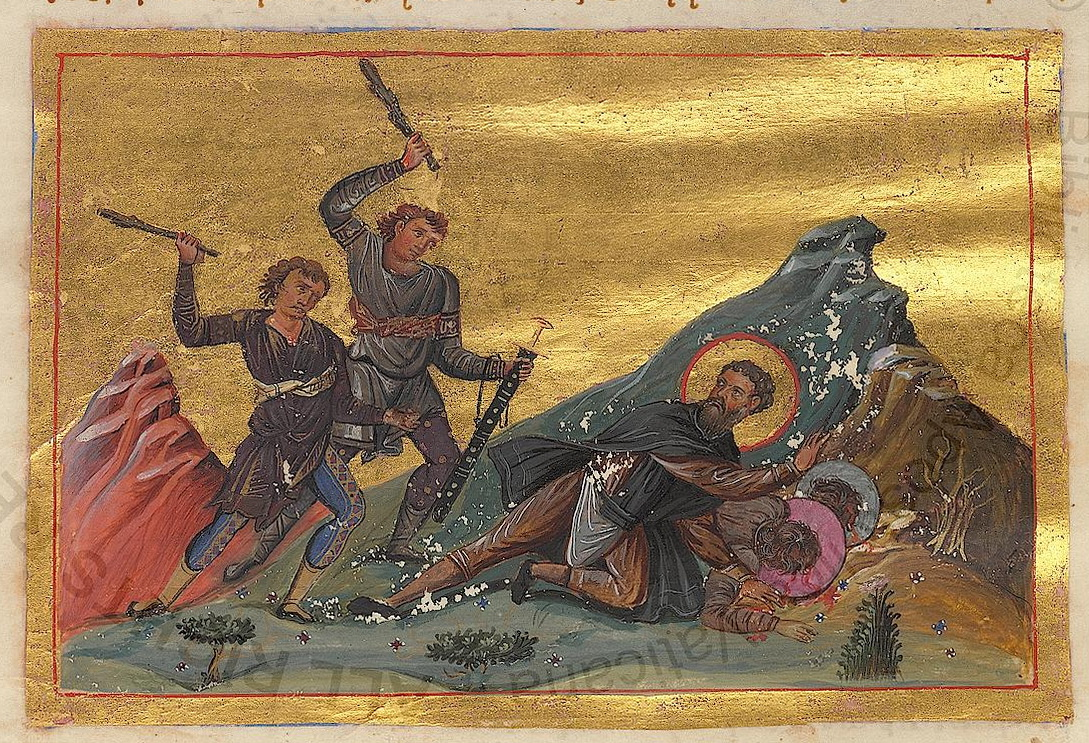
Martyrdom of Dometius of Persia and his two disciples.
(Menologion of Basil II, 10th century).

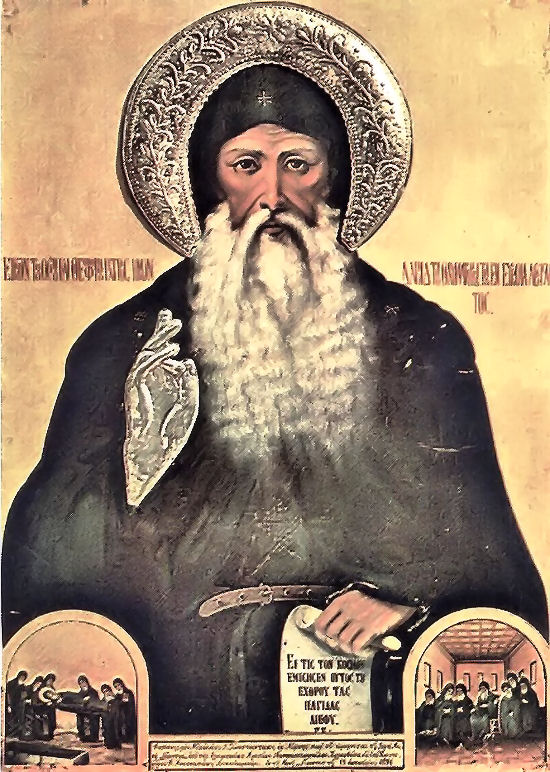
Venerable David of Euboea, Wonderworker

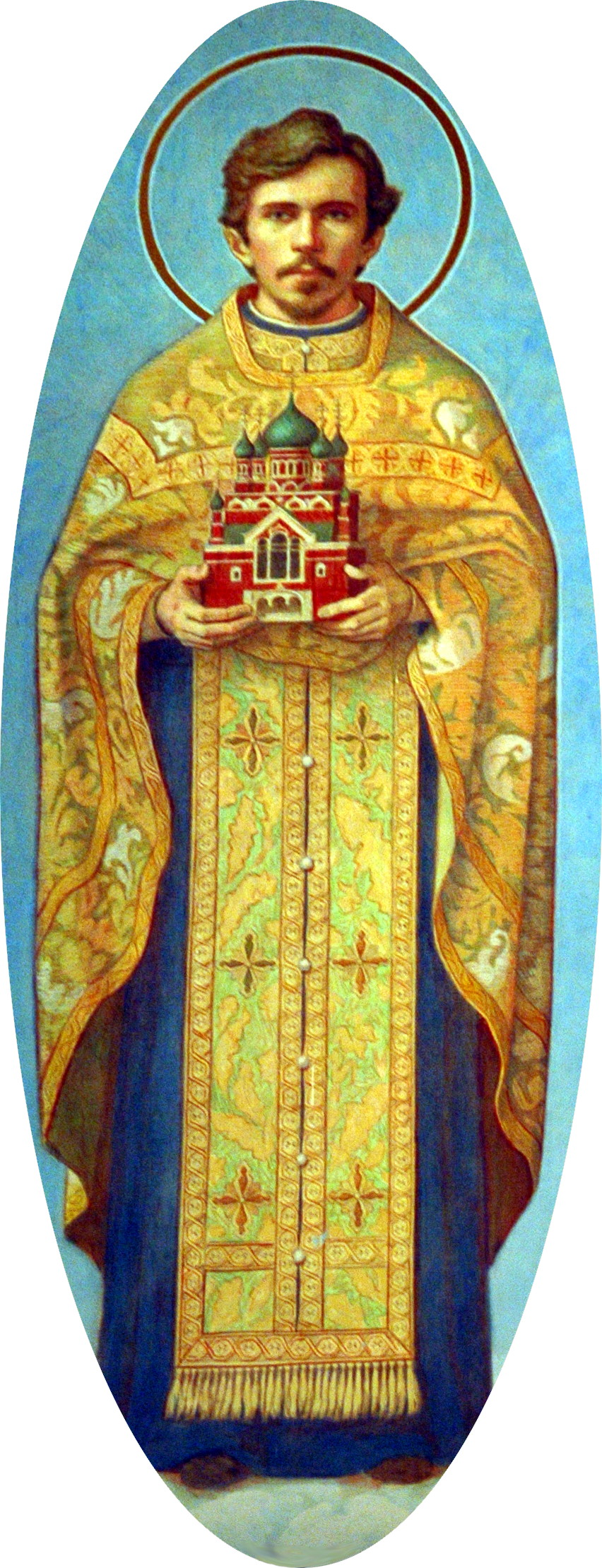
Altar fresco of Saint Alexander Hotovitzky

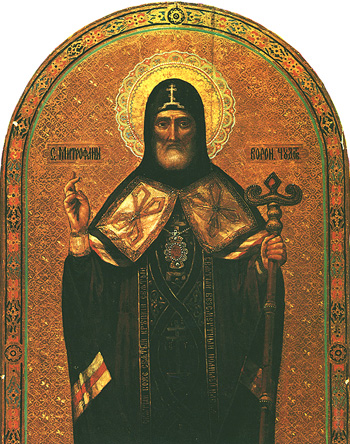
St. Metrophanes of Voronezh

== Sources ==
- August 7 / August 20. Orthodox Calendar (PRAVOSLAVIE.RU).
- August 20 / August 7. HOLY TRINITY RUSSIAN ORTHODOX CHURCH (A parish of the Patriarchate of Moscow).
- August 7. OCA - The Lives of the Saints.
- The Autonomous Orthodox Metropolia of Western Europe and the Americas (ROCOR). St. Hilarion Calendar of Saints for the year of our Lord 2004. St. Hilarion Press (Austin, TX). p. 58.
- Menologion: The Seventh Day Day of the Month of August. Orthodoxy in China.
- August 7. Latin Saints of the Orthodox Patriarchate of Rome.
- The Roman Martyrology. Transl. by the Archbishop of Baltimore. Last Edition, According to the Copy Printed at Rome in 1914. Revised Edition, with the Imprimatur of His Eminence Cardinal Gibbons. Baltimore: John Murphy Company, 1916. pp. 235-236.
- Rev. Richard Stanton. A Menology of England and Wales, or, Brief Memorials of the Ancient British and English Saints Arranged According to the Calendar, Together with the Martyrs of the 16th and 17th Centuries. London: Burns & Oates, 1892. pp. 383-386.

Greek Sources

- Great Synaxaristes: (in Greek) 7 ΑΥΓΟΥΣΤΟΥ. ΜΕΓΑΣ ΣΥΝΑΞΑΡΙΣΤΗΣ.
- (in Greek) Συναξαριστής. 7 Αυγούστου. ECCLESIA.GR. (H ΕΚΚΛΗΣΙΑ ΤΗΣ ΕΛΛΑΔΟΣ).

Russian Sources

- (in Russian) 20 августа (7 августа). Православная Энциклопедия под редакцией Патриарха Московского и всея Руси Кирилла (электронная версия). (Orthodox Encyclopedia - Pravenc.ru).
