= Gregory of Dekapolis =

Byzantine monk, saint

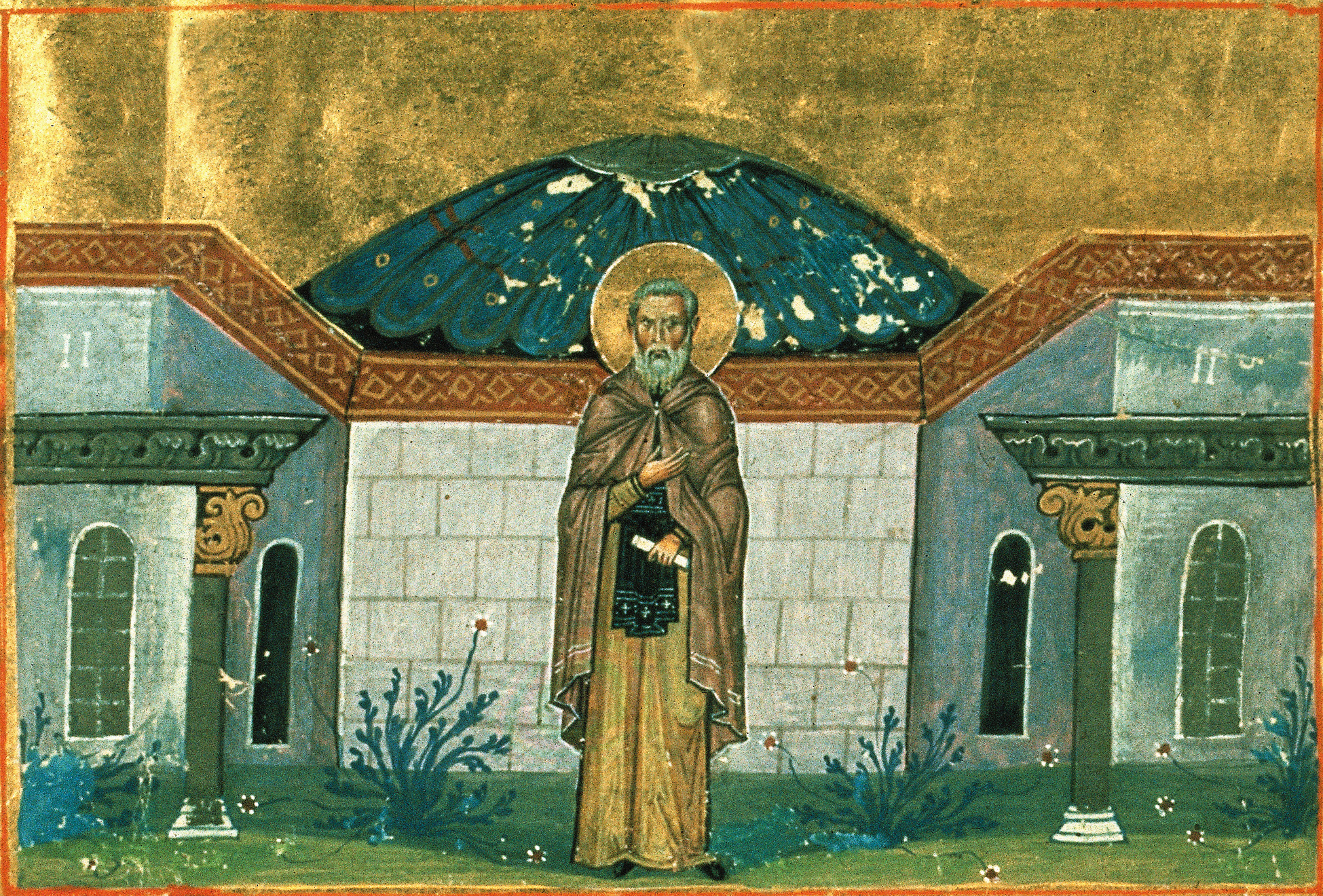
- Miniature of Saint Gregory of Dekapolis, from the Menologion of Basil II, ca. 985

the New Miracle-Worker
- Born: before 797; Irenopolis (modern-day İkizçınar, Turkey)
- Died: 20 November 842 or earlier Constantinople (modern-day Istanbul, Turkey)
- Venerated in: Eastern Orthodox Church; Roman Catholic Church
- Feast: November 20

Saint Gregory of Dekapolis or Gregory Dekapolites (Greek: Όσιος Γρηγόριος ο Δεκαπολίτης, romanized: Hagios Gregórios Dekapolitēs; before 797 – 20 November 842 or earlier) was a 9th-century Byzantine monk, notable for his miracle-working and his travels across the Byzantine world. He is known as "the New Miracle-Worker" (ο νέος θαυματουργός, ho neos thaumatourgos), and his feast day in the Eastern Orthodox Church and Roman Catholic Church is on November 20.

== Life ==
Gregory was born in the late 8th century at Irenopolis in the Isaurian Dekapolis, whence his sobriquet. Francis Dvornik placed his birth between 780 and 790, while Cyril Mango regarded the year 797 as a terminus ante quem for his birth. His parents were Sergios and Maria, and he had at least one brother, whose name is not known. A later relative of the family was the early 10th-century Patriarch of Constantinople, Euthymius.

According to his hagiography, he began his elementary schooling at age eight, but fled his home to the mountains when his parents wanted to marry him (ca. 815/6). There he encountered the former bishop of Irenopolis, who had been forced to abandon his see due to his opposition to the renewed adoption of Iconoclasm. After receiving his blessing, and on the advice of his mother, he entered the monastery where his brother was already a monk. Soon, however, he fell out with his pro-iconoclast abbot, and abandoned the monastery for that of his maternal uncle, Symeon. He remained at his uncle's monastery for 14 years, after which he asked permission to retire to a cave as a hermit (ca. 830). There he reportedly experienced a vision of the Tabor light, as well as an appearance by a woman who miraculously cured him of sexual desire by means of some sort of operation, a possible allusion to Gregory being a eunuch.

In ca. 832/3, after receiving a "divine command", he began his wanderings across the Byzantine world. He went first to Ephesus, whence he took ship for Prokonnesos, Ainos and Christoupolis. From there he journeyed overland to Thessalonica and Corinth. From Corinth he took again ship to Rome via Rhegion and Naples. Gregory remained in a cell in Rome for three months, before continuing his journey to Syracuse in Sicily, where he again spent time in isolated contemplation in a tower in the harbour. From Sicily he returned to Thessalonica via Otranto, where he was mistaken for an Arab spy and mistreated (ca. 834). At Thessalonica he taught several pupils, including Joseph the Hymnographer.

A few years later, possibly ca. 836/7, he went on—accompanied by Joseph, according to the latter's hagiography—to Constantinople, where he stayed at the Antypas Church or the Church of Saints Sergius and Bacchus, and visited the monastic community of Mount Olympus in Bithynia. His last years were marked by illness, first epilepsy and then from hydropsy. He died on a 20 November in the year 842 or, according to different interpretations, 841 or perhaps earlier still. In ca. 850, his remains were transferred to a monastery founded by Joseph the Hymnographer near the grave of John Chrysostomos in the Church of the Holy Apostles.

== Hagiography and veneration ==
The hagiography describing his life is attributed to the contemporary monk and writer Ignatios the Deacon, but the authorship is disputed. Although he lived through the second period of the Byzantine Iconoclasm, and is recorded as an advocate of the iconophile view, Gregory was not persecuted. As a saint, he was chiefly remembered as a miracle-worker, whence his surname νέος θαυματουργός, "the New Miracle-Worker". The only extant writing of Gregory himself is a sermon regarding the—likely historical—conversion of a Muslim to Christianity.

As a historical work, his hagiography is a poor source about contemporary events, but "provides much evidence on administrative and legal practice" in contemporary Byzantium. Images of Gregory are rare, and he is depicted "as a monk with a trim round white beard". His feast day in the Eastern Orthodox Church is on November 20.

== Sources ==
- Kazhdan, Alexander; Ševčenko, Nancy Patterson (1991). "Gregory of Dekapolis". In Kazhdan, Alexander (ed.). The Oxford Dictionary of Byzantium. Oxford and New York: Oxford University Press. p. 880. ISBN 0-19-504652-8.
- Sahas, Daniel J. (2009). "Gregory Dekapolites". In Thomas, David; Roggema, Barbara (eds.). Christian-Muslim Relations: A Bibliographical History, Volume 1 (600-900). Leiden and Boston: BRILL. pp. 614–617. ISBN 978-90-04-16975-3.
- Winkelmann, Friedhelm; Lilie, Ralph-Johannes; et al. (2000). "Gregorios Dekapolites (#2486)". Prosopographie der mittelbyzantinischen Zeit: I. Abteilung (641–867), 2. Band: Georgios (#2183) – Leon (#4270) (in German). Walter de Gruyter. pp. 96–99. ISBN 3-11-016672-0.
- Venerable Gregory Decapolite. OCA - Lives of the Saints. Retrieved: 17 September 2014.
- Great Synaxaristes: (in Greek) Ὁ Ὅσιος Γρηγόριος ὁ Δεκαπολίτης. 20 Νοεμβρίου. ΜΕΓΑΣ ΣΥΝΑΞΑΡΙΣΤΗΣ.
