= November 21 (Eastern Orthodox liturgics) =

Day in the Eastern Orthodox liturgical calendar

Eastern Orthodox liturgical calendar
November 20	November 21	November 22
November 21 O.S. ≍ December 4 N.S. November 21 N.S ≍ November 8 O.S.

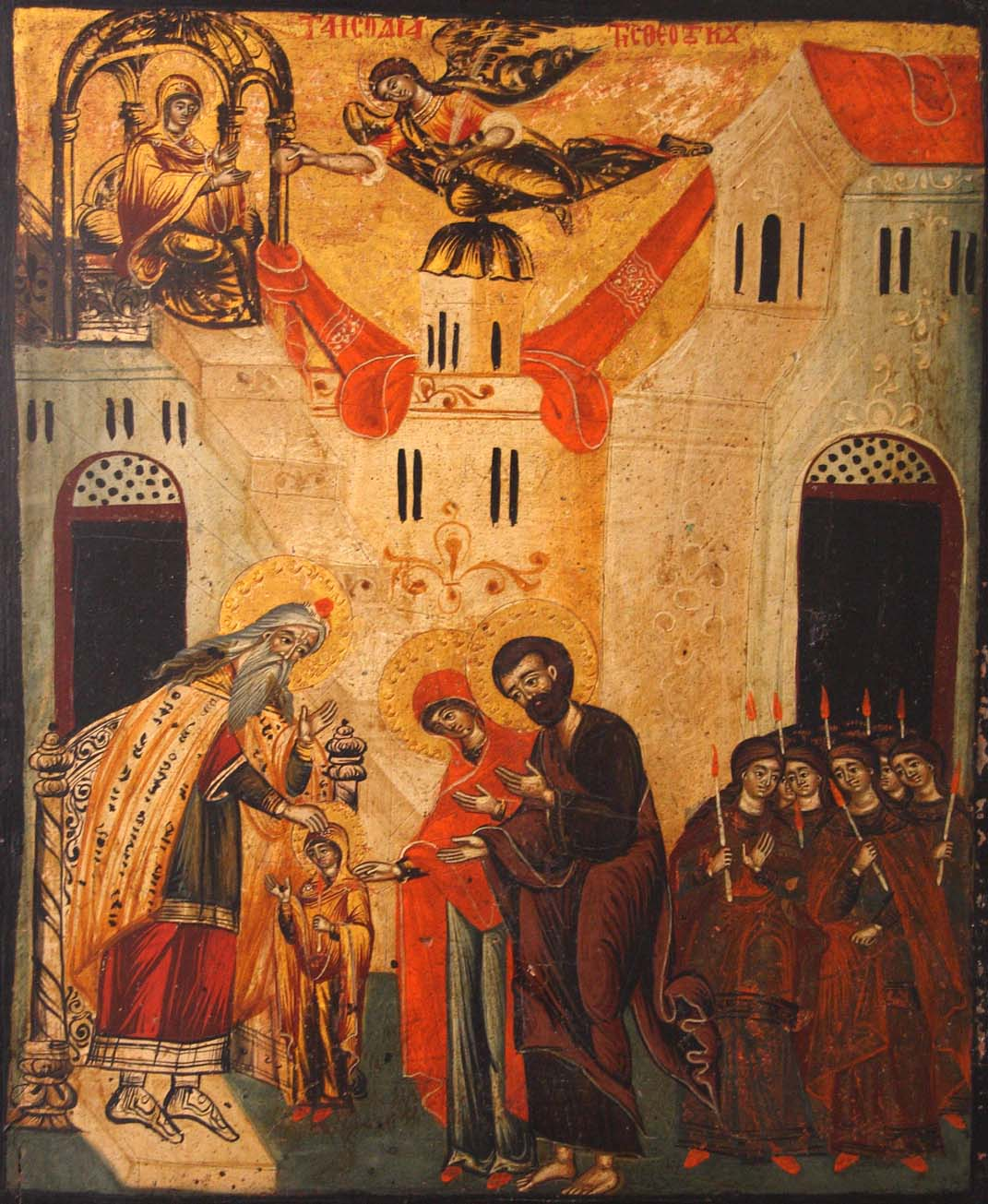
The Entry of the Most Holy Theotokos into the Temple. (National Museum of Fine Arts. 17th-18th century).

November 21 in Eastern Orthodox liturgical calendars is a feast day and a day of commemoration of saints and martyrs. Although some Orthodox churches use the Revised Julian Calendar and others use the traditional Julian calendar, the fixed commemorations for their respective November 21 are broadly the same, no matter which calendar is used. (Note: Despite the dates being the same, the days to which they refer typically differ by 13 days. The notation Old Style or O.S. is sometimes used to indicate a date in the traditional Julian Calendar (the "Old Calendar"). The notation New Style or N.S. indicates a date in the Revised Julian calendar (the "New Calendar").)

== Feasts ==
- The Entry of the Most Holy Theotokos into the Temple (Note: "IN the temple at Jerusalem, the Presentation of the Blessed Virgin Mary, Mother of God.") (Note: Name days celebrated today include: Maria, Mary (Μαρία).)

== Saints ==
—

== Pre-Schism Western saints ==
- Saint Rufus of Rome, the disciple whom Saint Paul greets in Romans 16:13 (c. 90) (Note: "The same day, the birthday of blessed Rufus, mentioned by the apostle St. Paul in his epistle to the Romans.") (Note: St. Mark says in his Gospel (xv, 21) that Simon of Cyrene was the father of Rufus, and as Mark wrote his Gospel for the Roman Christians, this Rufus is probably the same as the one to whom Paul sent a salutation [cf. Cornely, "Commentar. in Epist. ad Romanos" (Paris, 1896), 778 sq.].)
- Martyrs Celsus and Clement, in Rome (Note: "At Rome, the martyrdom of the Saints Celsus and Clement.")
- Martyrs Demetrius and Honorius, in Ostia in Italy (Note: "At Ostia, the holy martyrs Demetrius and Honorius.") (see also: December 22)
- Martyrs Honorius, Eutychius and Stephen, in Asta in Andalusia in Spain under Diocletian (c. 300) (Note: "In Spain, the holy martyrs Honorius, Eutychius and Stephen.")
- Saint Gelasius I, Pope of Rome (496) (Note: Born in Africa, he became Pope of Rome in 492. He was one of the most energetic bishops of his time.) (Note: "At Rome, St. Gelasius, pope, distinguished for learning and sanctity.")
- Saint Digain, son of Constantine Corneu, King of Dumnonia (5th century) (Note: A son of Constantine, a lord in Cornwall. Llangernw in Clwyd in Wales is named after him.)
- Saint Maurus of Verona, twelfth Bishop of Verona, Confessor (c. 600) (Note: "At Verona, St. Maurus, bishop and confessor.")
- Venerable Columbanus of Bobbio, Abbot and founder of Luxeuil Abbey in Gaul, and Bobbio Abbey in Italy (615) (Note: "In the monastery of Bobio, the departure from this life of St. Columban, abbot, who founded many convents and governed a large number of monks. He died at an advanced age, celebrated for many virtues.") (see also: November 23)
- Saint Amelberga of Susteren, Benedictine Abbess of Susteren Abbey in the Netherlands (c. 900)
- Saint Hilary, Benedictine Abbot of San Vincenzo in Volturno (1011–1045), who revived the monastic life there (c. 1045)

== Post-Schism Orthodox saints ==
- Saint Yaropolk-Peter, Prince of Vladimir in Volhynia (11th century) (see also: November 22)
- Venerable Sozomenos, Bishop of Karpaseia in Cyprus, and Wonderworker (12th century) (Note: Venerable Sozomenos is possibly one of the "300 Allemagne Saints" in Cyprus. The 300 Allemagne Saints came to Cyprus from Palestine, and lived as ascetics in various parts of the island. Included among the "300 Allemagne Saints" are: Venerable Anastasios the Wonderwoker of Cyprus, September 17; Venerable Abbacum the Ascetic of Cyprus, Wonderworker, December 2; Venerable Cassian the Martyr (Kassianos), December 4; Venerable Calantius of Tamassos (Kalandios), April 26; Martyr Constantine of Cyprus (Constantine of Allemagne), Wonderworker, July 1; According to some of their lives in the Great Synaxaristes, after the dissolution of the Second Crusade (1147–1149), they decided to live the monastic life in the Jordan desert. However since the Latins there disturbed them, they relocated to Cyprus and dispersed over the island.) (see also: November 20)

== Other commemorations ==
- Synaxis of churches that are dedicated to the Entrance of the Most Holy Theotokos
- "Everlasting Hope" and "Eikonistria" (Swinging one) Icons of the Mother of God
- Glorification of the New Hieromartyr Alexander Hotovitzky, Priest of New York and Protopresbyter of Moscow, Missionary of America, Hieromartyr of the Bolshevik yoke (1937) (see also: August 7, December 4)
- Repose of Blessed Pasha of Birsk, Fool-for-Christ (1891)
- Repose of New Hieromartyr Alexis Benemansky of Tver, Priest (1937) (see also: November 22)
- Repose of Metropolitan Philaret Voznesensky of New York (1985) (see also: November 8)

== Icon gallery ==
The Entry of the Most Holy Theotokos into the Temple.
(Menologion of Basil II, 10th century).

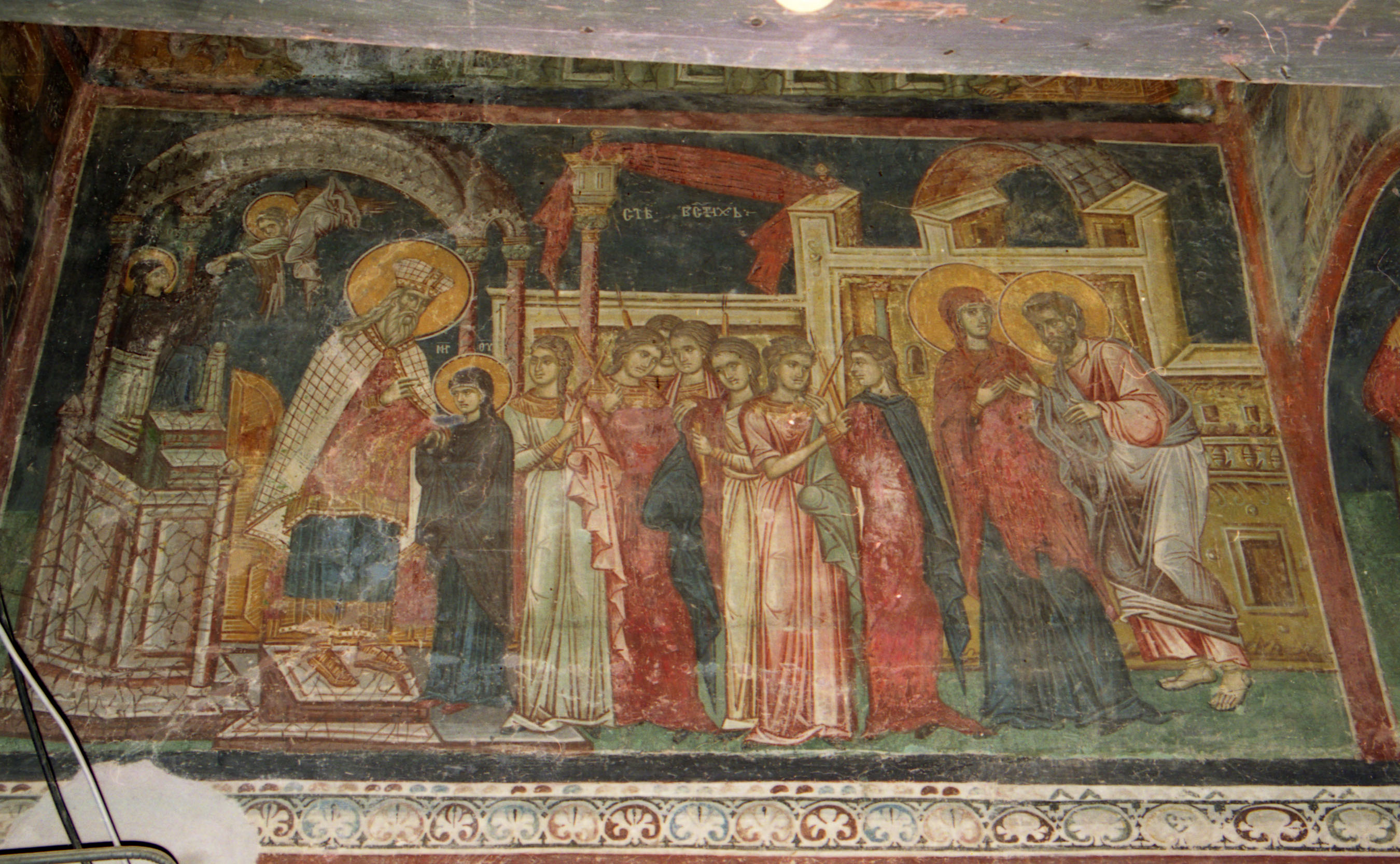
Entry of the Most Holy Theotokos into the Temple
(14th century).

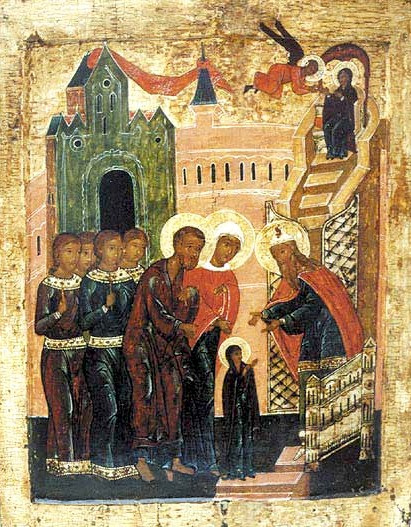
Entry of the Most Holy Theotokos into the Temple
(16th century).

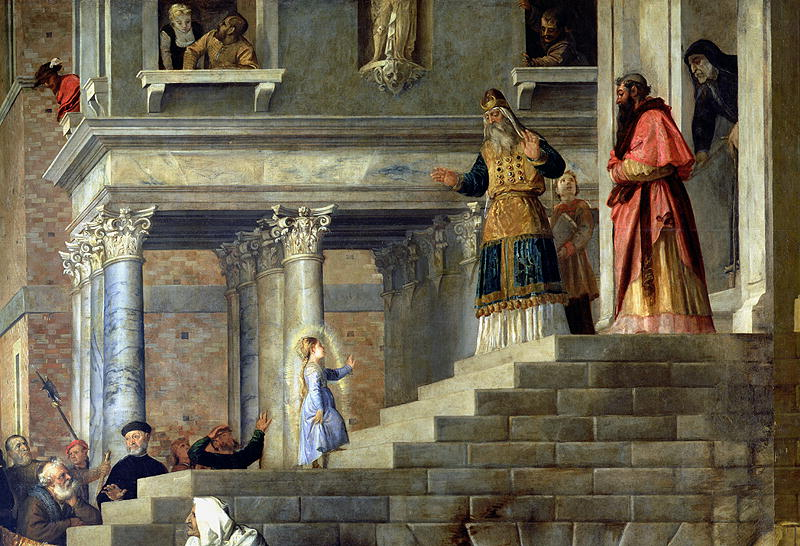
Entry of the Most Holy Theotokos into the Temple
(Titian).

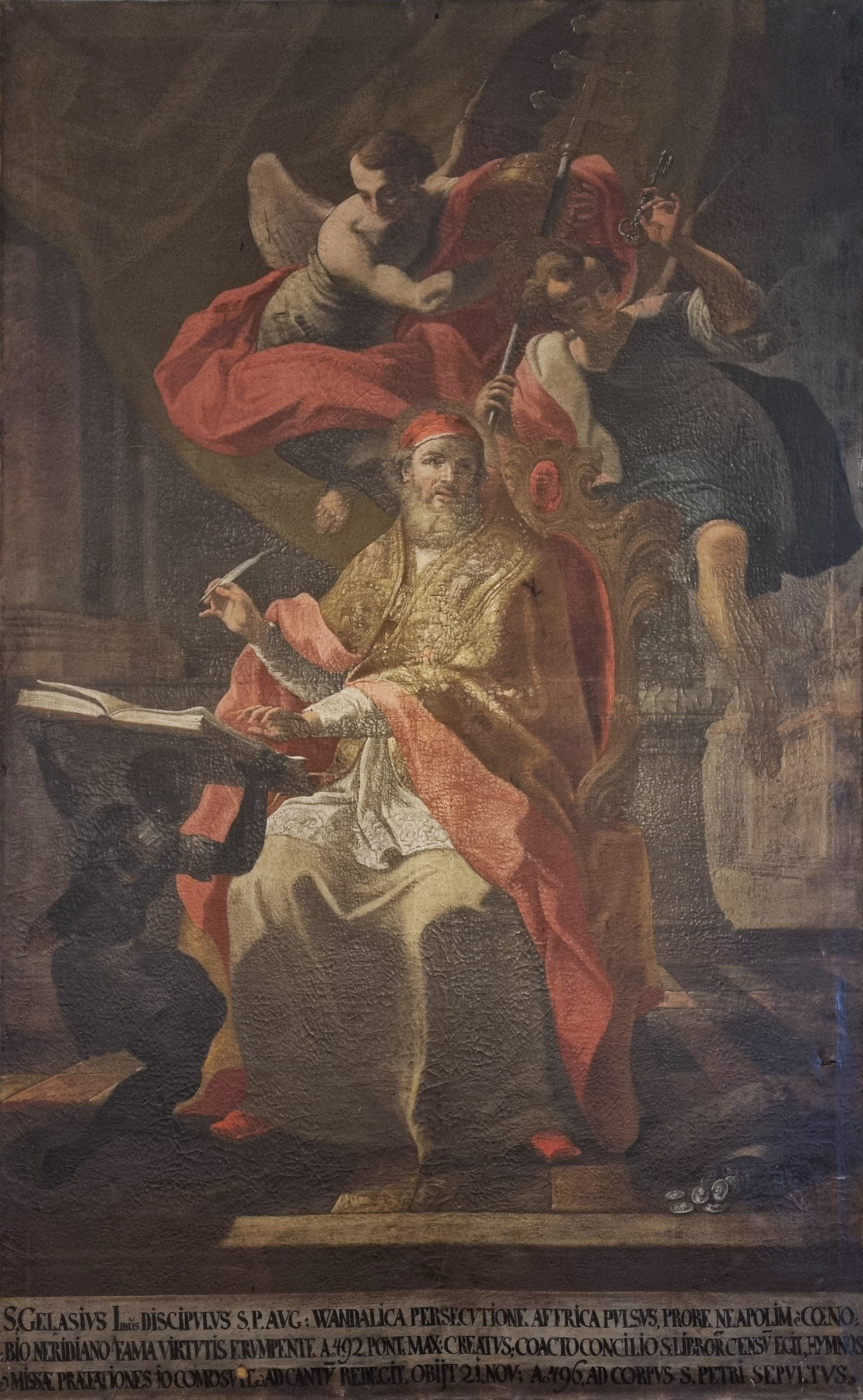
St. Gelasius I, Pope of Rome.

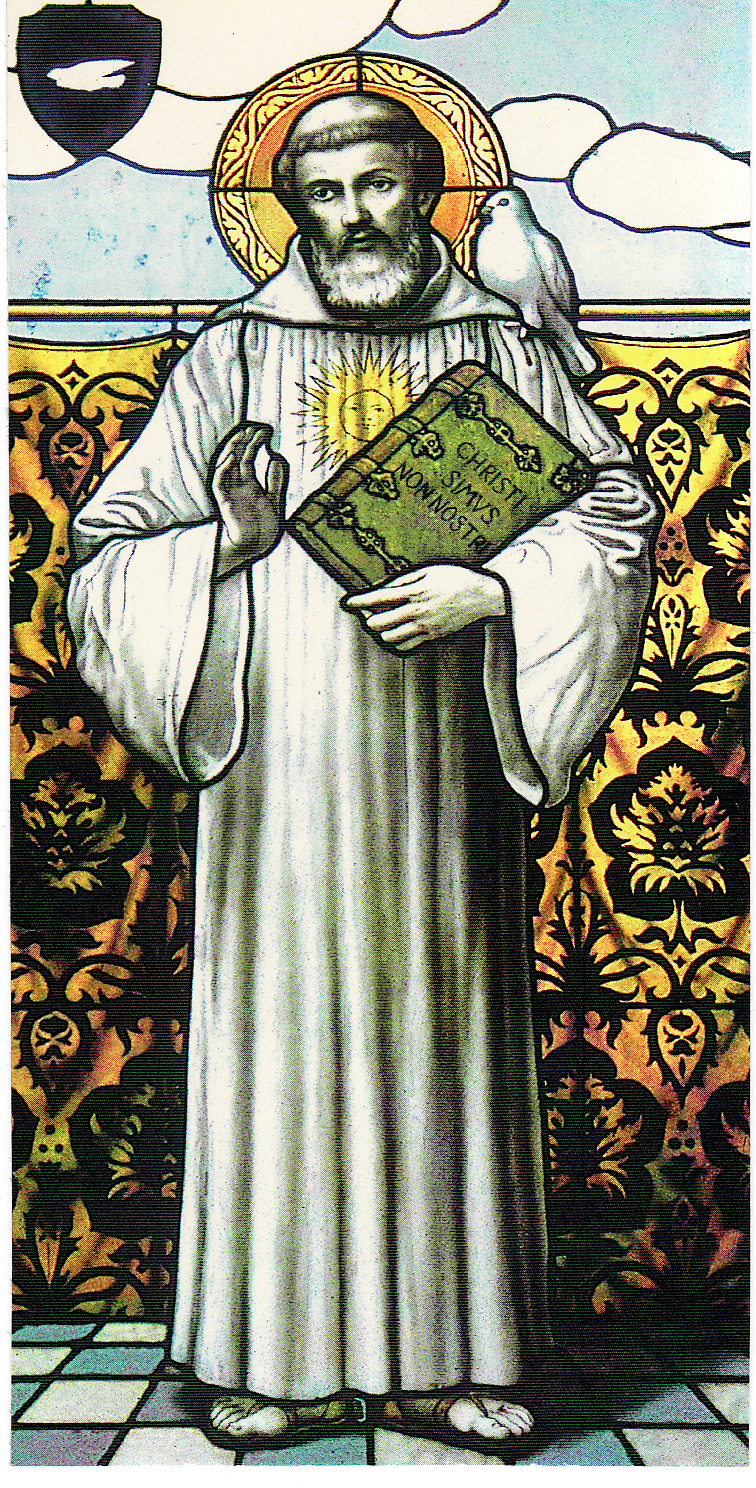
St. Columbanus of Bobbio, Abbot and founder of Luxeuil Abbey in Gaul, and Bobbio Abbey in Italy.

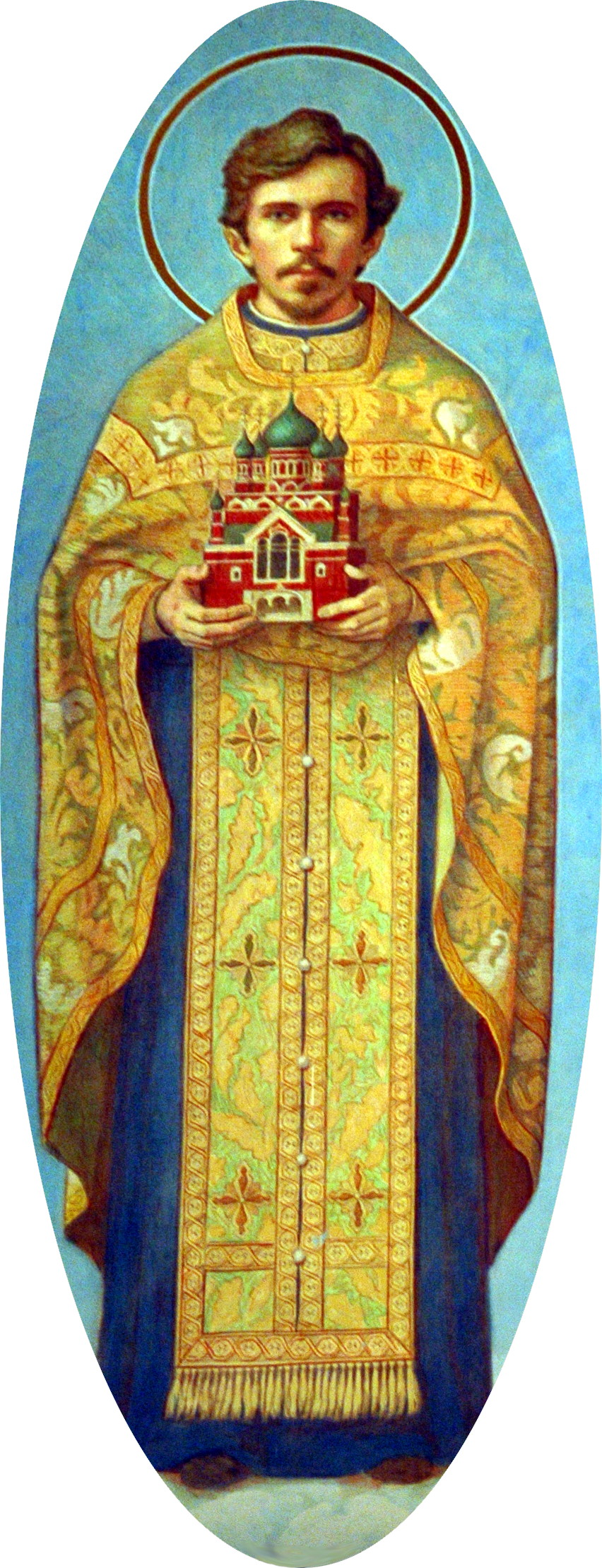
New Hieromartyr Alexander Hotovitzky.

== Sources ==
- November 21 / December 4. Orthodox Calendar (PRAVOSLAVIE.RU).
- December 4 / November 21. Holy Trinity Russian Orthodox Church (A parish of the Patriarchate of Moscow).
- November 21. OCA - The Lives of the Saints.
- The Autonomous Orthodox Metropolia of Western Europe and the Americas (ROCOR). St. Hilarion Calendar of Saints for the year of our Lord 2004. St. Hilarion Press (Austin, TX). p. 87.
- The Twenty-First Day of the Month of November. Orthodoxy in China.
- November 21. Latin Saints of the Orthodox Patriarchate of Rome.
- The Roman Martyrology. Transl. by the Archbishop of Baltimore. Last Edition, According to the Copy Printed at Rome in 1914. Revised Edition, with the Imprimatur of His Eminence Cardinal Gibbons. Baltimore: John Murphy Company, 1916. pp. 359–360.
- Rev. Richard Stanton. A Menology of England and Wales, or, Brief Memorials of the Ancient British and English Saints Arranged According to the Calendar, Together with the Martyrs of the 16th and 17th Centuries. London: Burns & Oates, 1892. pp. 561–562.

Greek Sources

- Great Synaxaristes: (in Greek) 21 ΝΟΕΜΒΡΙΟΥ. ΜΕΓΑΣ ΣΥΝΑΞΑΡΙΣΤΗΣ.
- (in Greek) Συναξαριστής. 21 Νοεμβρίου. ECCLESIA.GR. (H ΕΚΚΛΗΣΙΑ ΤΗΣ ΕΛΛΑΔΟΣ).
- (in Greek) November 21. Ορθόδοξος Συναξαριστής.

Russian Sources

- (in Russian) 4 декабря (21 ноября). Православная Энциклопедия под редакцией Патриарха Московского и всея Руси Кирилла (электронная версия). (Orthodox Encyclopedia - Pravenc.ru).
- (in Russian) 21 ноября по старому стилю / по новому стилю. Русская Православная Церковь - Православный церковный календарь на 2018 год.
