= Isnebol =

Isnebol was the name of several places in the Ottoman Empire:

- Zenopolis, Isauria, an ancient city in southern Asia Minor
- Tran, Bulgaria
