= December 4 (Eastern Orthodox liturgics) =

Day in the Eastern Orthodox liturgical calendar

Eastern Orthodox liturgical calendar
December 3	December 4	December 5
December 4 O.S. ≍ December 17 N.S. December 4 N.S ≍ November 21 O.S.

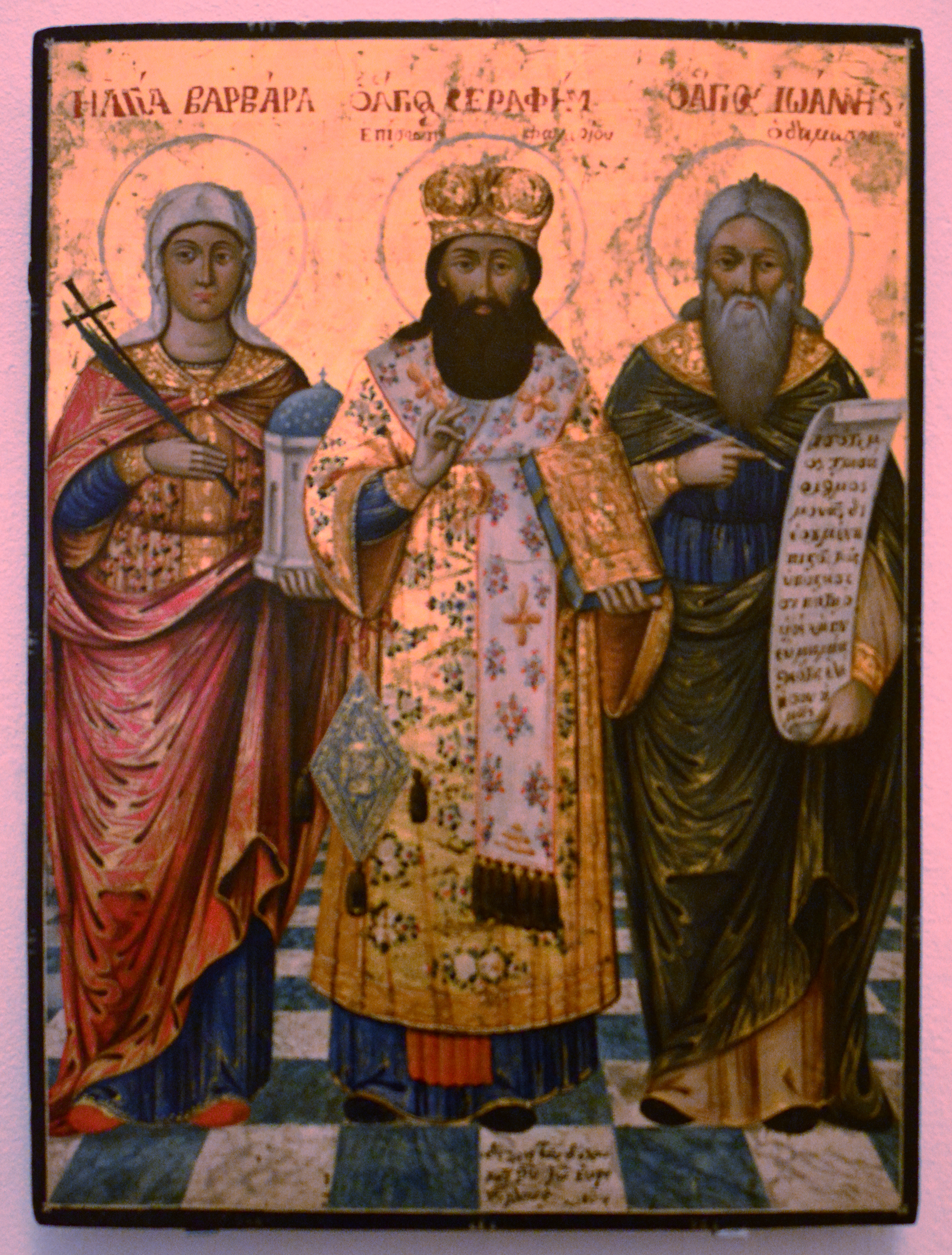
December 4 Saints: St. Barbara, St. Seraphim of Phanarion, and St. John of Damascus.

December 4 in Eastern Orthodox liturgical calendars is a feast day and a day of commemoration of saints and martyrs. Although some Orthodox churches use the Revised Julian Calendar and others use the traditional Julian calendar, the fixed commemorations for their respective December 4 are broadly the same, no matter which calendar is used. (Note: Despite the dates being the same, the days to which they refer typically differ by 13 days. The notation Old Style or O.S. is sometimes used to indicate a date in the traditional Julian Calendar (the "Old Calendar"). The notation New Style or N.S. indicates a date in the Revised Julian calendar (the "New Calendar").)

== Saints ==
- Commemoration of the Twelve (Minor) Prophets (Note: This commemoration is recorded in the "Jerusalemitic Canonarion".)
- Apostle Crispus of the Seventy Apostles, Bishop of Chalcedon (1st century)
- Greatmartyr Barbara and Martyr Juliana, at Heliopolis in Syria (306) (Note: "At Nicomedia, the passion of St. Barbara, virgin and martyr, in the persecution of Maximinus. After a series of sufferings, a long imprisonment, burning with torches and the cutting off of her breasts, she terminated her martyrdom by the sword.") (Note: St. Barbara is a patron saint of the city of Kyiv (where her relics are enshrined) and there was a time when tourists to Kyiv received a free copy of the Akathist in her honour. Religious medals depicting Saints Anthony and Theodosius of the Kyiv Caves would often have a depiction of St. Barbara on the other side. The daughter of an avidly pagan Roman senator, St. Barbara was boiled in oil for her determination to remain a Christian. This led to the practice of boiling pyrohy in oil on her feast-day.)
- Martyr Christodulus (Christodoulos) and Virgin Martyr Christodula (Christodoula, Christodouli), by the sword (Note: In some Synaxaria, Saint Christodoula is commemorated together with Saint Myrope of Chios (December 2).)
- Saint John, Bishop and Wonderworker of Polybotum (Polybotus), Phrygia Salutaris (716) (Note: The Monk John, Bishop of Polyboteia (in Phyrgia), was known as a denouncer of the heresy and impiety of the emperor Leo the Isaurian. The saint died at the beginning of the 8th century. For his holy life he was granted by the Lord the gift to heal the infirm and cast out evil spirits.)
- Venerable John of Damascus (John Damascene), Monk of St. Sabbas Monastery (749)

== Pre-Schism Western saints ==
- Saint Felix, fifth Bishop of Bologna, previously a Deacon of the Church of Milan under Saint Ambrose of Milan (429) (Note: "At Bologna, St. Felix, bishop, who previously had been deacon of the church of Milan, under St. Ambrose.")
- Saint Bertoara, Abbess of Notre-Dame-de-Sales in Bourges (614)
- Saint Ada, niece of Engebert, Bishop of Le Mans, she became a nun at Soissons, and Abbess in Le Mans (7th century)

== Post-Schism Orthodox saints ==
- Saint Gennadius (Gennady), Archbishop of Novgorod (1505)

=== New martyrs and confessors ===
- Venerable Cassian the Martyr (Kassianos), one of the "300 Allemagne Saints" in Cyprus (late 12th century) (Note: The 300 Allemagne Saints came to Cyprus from Palestine, and lived as ascetics in various parts of the island. These people were Greek migrant workers who worked in Germany or «Alamania» (Allemagne). They had participated in the Second Crusade (1147 - 1149), and after its dissolution, after going on pilgrimage in Jerusalem, they decided to live the monastic life in the Jordan desert. However since the Latins there disturbed them, they relocated to Cyrus and dispersed over the island. Two others of these 300 saints are: Constantine of Cyprus (Constantine of Allemagne) (July 1); and Venerable Abbacum the Ascetic of Cyprus, Wonderworker (December 2).) (see also: October 6)
- New Hieromartyr Seraphim, Archbishop of Phanarion and Neochorion (1601) (Note: The Hieromonk Seraphim, Bishop of the Phanar was from the village of Bezoula, Agrapha diocese in Greece. He lived in asceticism at first as a monk at the Monastery of the Most Holy Theotokos at Koronis, and later was chosen as bishop of the Phanar and Neochorion. For his refusal to accept Islam, he was beaten and impaled by the Turks in 1601. His head is at the monastery at Koronis and has been glorified by numerous miracles.)
- New Hieromartyr Nicholas Tsedrik, Priest (1917)
- New Martyrs of Perm (1918):
  - Hieromartyrs Alexis Saburov, John Pyankov, Protopresbyters (see also: December 23)
  - Alexander Posokhin and Nicholas Yakhontov, Priests
  - Basil Kashin, Deacon, and with him 10 Martyrs
- New Hieromartyrs Damascene Tsedrik, Bishop of Glukhov, and his father, Nicholas Tsedrik, Priest (1935)
- New Hieromartyr Demetrius Nevedomsky, Priest (1937)
- New Virgin Martyrs Catherine Arskoy (Note: See: (in Russian) Арская, Екатерина Андреевна. Википедии. (Russian Wikipedia).) and Kyra Obolensky (Note: See: (in Russian) Оболенская, Кира Ивановна. Википедии. (Russian Wikipedia).) (1937)

== Other commemorations ==
- Icon of the Mother of God of Damascus (Panayia Tricherousa, "Three-handed Theotokos") (c. 717) (Note: The Damascene Icon of the Mother of God, by ancient tradition, was painted by St. John of Damascus in gratitude to the Theotokos for the miraculous healing of his right hand, cut off through the perfidy of Emperor Leo the Isaurian. This icon is also known as "Of the Three Hands" Icon of the Mother of God (June 28, and July 12).)
- Glorification of the New Hieromartyr Alexander Hotovitzky, Priest of New York and Protopresbyter of Moscow, Missionary of America, Hieromartyr of the Bolshevik yoke (1937) (see also: August 7, November 21)

== Icon gallery ==
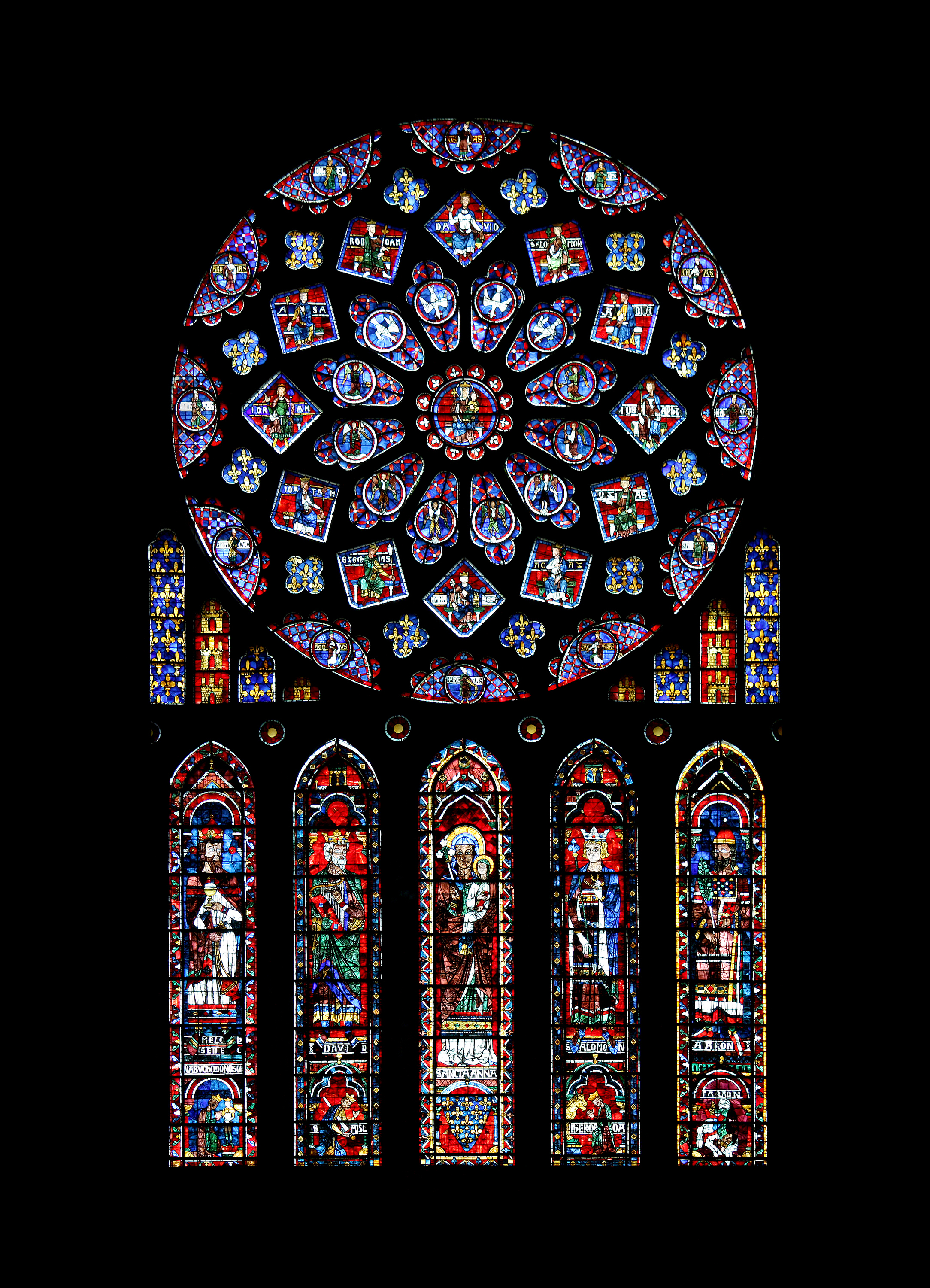
Northern rose window of Chartres Cathedral. The rose depicts the Glorification of the Virgin Mary, the twelve kings of Juda, and the Twelve Prophets.

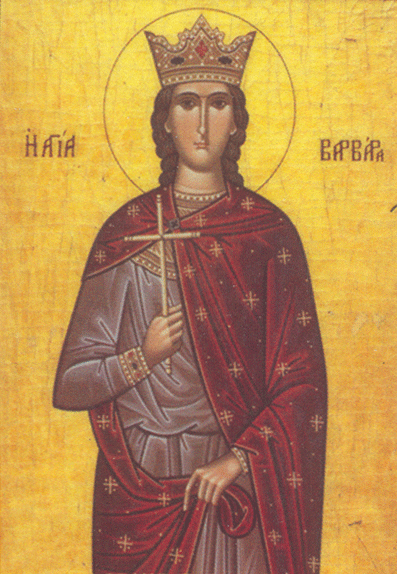
Greatmartyr Barbara.

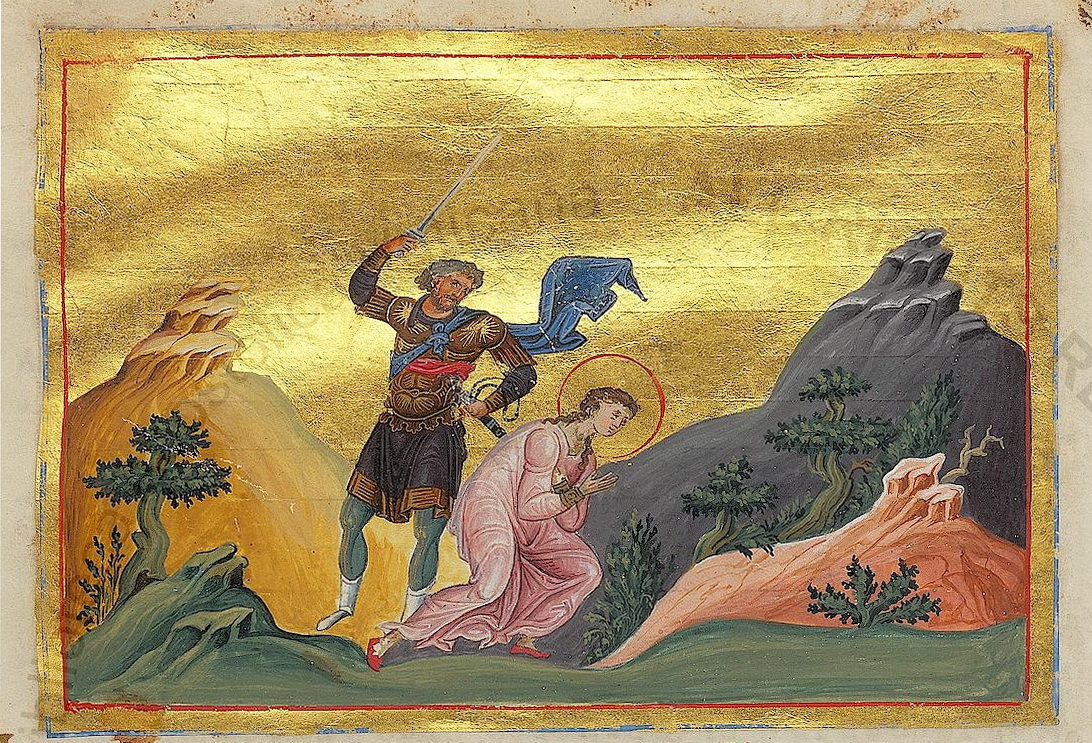
Greatmartyr Barbara of Nicomedia.
(Menologion of Basil II, 10th century).

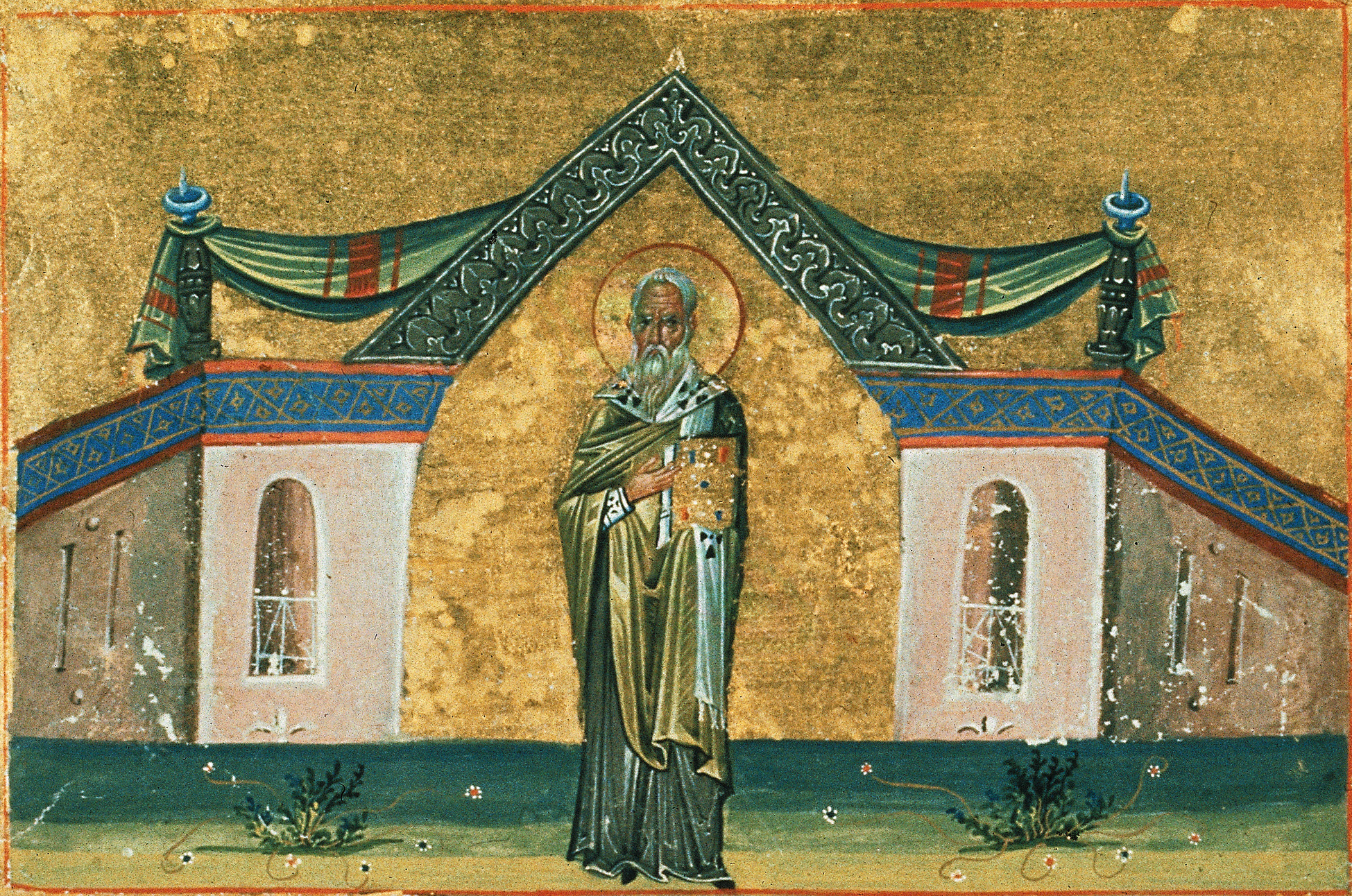
Saint John the Wonderworker, Bishop of Polybotum (Menologion of Basil II, 10th century).

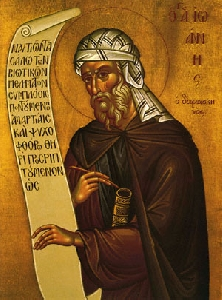
St. John of Damascus.

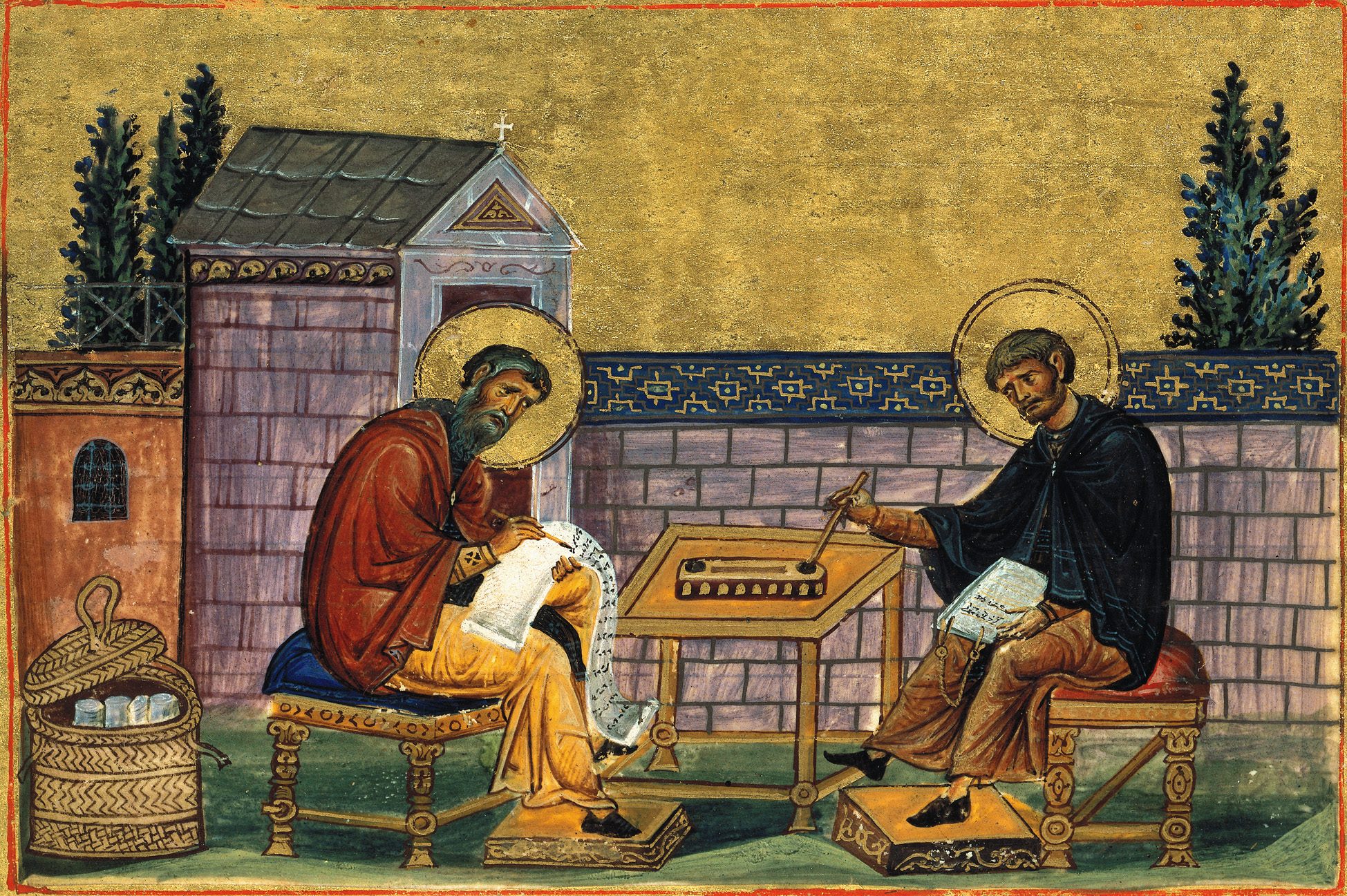
St. John of Damascus and St. Cosmas of Maiuma, as scribes.
(Menologion of Basil II, 10th century).

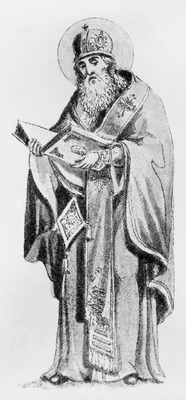
St. Gennady of Novgorod.

New Virgin Martyr Catherine Arskoy.

New Virgin Martyr Kyra Obolensky

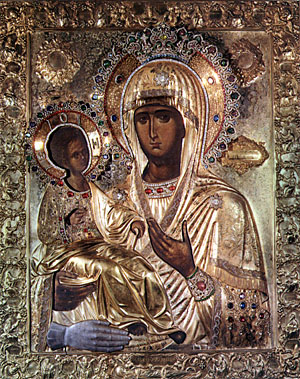
Icon of Panagia Tricherousa ("Three-handed Theotokos").

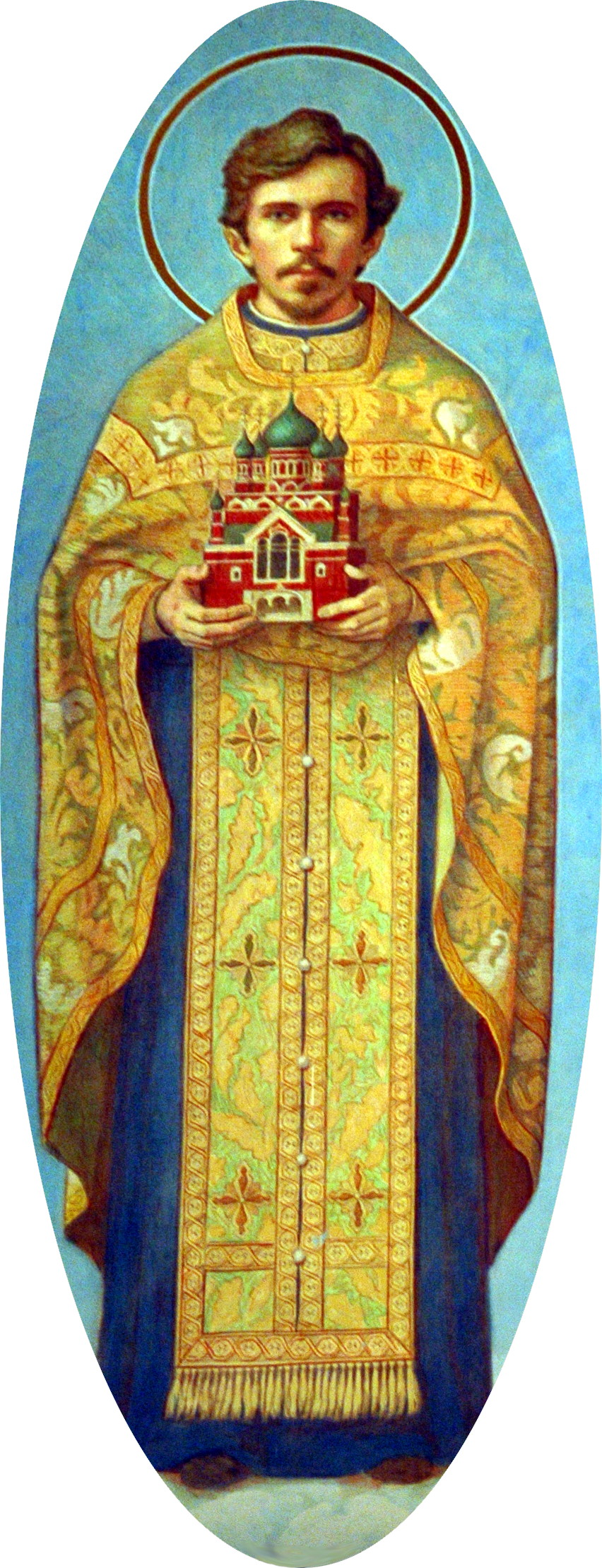
St. Alexander Hotovitzky, Hieromartyr of the Bolshevik yoke, Missionary of America.

== Sources ==
- December 4/17. Orthodox Calendar (PRAVOSLAVIE.RU).
- December 17 / December 4. HOLY TRINITY RUSSIAN ORTHODOX CHURCH (A parish of the Patriarchate of Moscow).
- December 4. OCA - The Lives of the Saints.
- December 4. Latin Saints of the Orthodox Patriarchate of Rome.
- The Roman Martyrology. Transl. by the Archbishop of Baltimore. Last Edition, According to the Copy Printed at Rome in 1914. Revised Edition, with the Imprimatur of His Eminence Cardinal Gibbons. Baltimore: John Murphy Company, 1916. pp. 373–374.
- Rev. Richard Stanton. A Menology of England and Wales, or, Brief Memorials of the Ancient British and English Saints Arranged According to the Calendar, Together with the Martyrs of the 16th and 17th Centuries. London: Burns & Oates, 1892. pp. 583-585.

Greek Sources

- Great Synaxaristes: (in Greek) 4 ΔΕΚΕΜΒΡΙΟΥ. ΜΕΓΑΣ ΣΥΝΑΞΑΡΙΣΤΗΣ.
- (in Greek) Συναξαριστής. 4 Δεκεμβρίου. ECCLESIA.GR. (H ΕΚΚΛΗΣΙΑ ΤΗΣ ΕΛΛΑΔΟΣ).
- (in Greek) December 4. Ορθόδοξος Συναξαριστής.

Russian Sources

- (in Russian) 17 декабря (4 декабря). Православная Энциклопедия под редакцией Патриарха Московского и всея Руси Кирилла (электронная версия). (Orthodox Encyclopedia - Pravenc.ru).
- (in Russian) 4 декабря (ст.ст.) 17 декабря 2014 (нов. ст.). Русская Православная Церковь Отдел внешних церковных связей. (DECR).
