= November 20 (Eastern Orthodox liturgics) =

Day in the Eastern Orthodox liturgical calendar

Eastern Orthodox liturgical calendar
November 19	November 20	November 21
November 20 O.S. ≍ December 3 N.S. November 20 N.S ≍ November 7 O.S.

An Eastern Orthodox cross

November 20 in Eastern Orthodox liturgical calendars is a feast day and a day of commemoration of saints and martyrs. Although some Orthodox churches use the Revised Julian Calendar and others use the traditional Julian calendar, the fixed commemorations for their respective November 20 are broadly the same, no matter which calendar is used. (Note: Despite the dates being the same, the days to which they refer typically differ by 13 days. The notation Old Style or O.S. is sometimes used to indicate a date in the traditional Julian Calendar (the "Old Calendar"). The notation New Style or N.S. indicates a date in the Revised Julian calendar (the "New Calendar").)

== Feasts ==
- Forefeast of the Entry into the Temple of the Most Holy Theotokos.

== Saints ==
- Martyr Dasius of Dorostolum, Romania (303) (Note: "At Dorostorum, in Mysia, St. Dasius, bishop, who, for refusing to consent to the impurities practised on the feast of Saturn, was put to death, under the governor Bassus.")
- Martyrs Eustathios the Deacon, Thespesios, and Anatolios, of Nicaea (312) (Note: "The Holy Martyrs Eustathius, Thespesius and Anatolius, natives of the city of Gangra, were the children of a rich merchant. They were baptized by Bishop Anthimus of Nicomedia (September 3). They died as martyrs at Nicea, after suffering fierce tortures.") (Note: "At Nicaea, in Bithynia, the holy martyrs Eustachius, Thespesius and Anatolius, in the persecution of Maximinus.")
- Martyrs of Persia under Shapur II (343): (Note: "In Persia, the martyrdom of the holy bishop Nersas and his companions.") (Note: "Saint Nerses the bishop suffered for Christ in Persia with his disciple Joseph; Bishops John, Saverius, Isaac and Hypatius; the Martyrs Azades the Eunuch, Savonius, Thekla, Anna and many other men and women. They were executed in 343 during a persecution against Christians under the emperor Sapor II. St Nerses and his disciple Joseph were beheaded.")

- Hieromartyrs Nerses, Bishop of Shahrqart (Kirkuk) and his disciple Martyr Joseph;
- Hieromartyrs John, Shapur, and Isaac, Bishops of Seit Selok (by stoning); Hypatius (Papias) and Isaac, Presbyters (by beheading); and Jonam the ascetic; (Note: In Parisian Codices 1578 and 1624 they are identified as Bishops.)
- Martyrs Guhshtazad (Azades) the Eunuch, (Note: "St Azades was strangled by an apostate priest.") Sasanis, Noelmaris and Zarouantinis (Zaun), of Lashom, lanced for refusing to sacrifice to the sun god of the Persians;
- Virgin-martyrs Thekla, Bautha, Denachis, Tatun, Mama, Malochia, Ana, Nana, Asti and Malach, by the sword, for refusing to worship the Persian fire god.

- Martyrs Bassus and 42 companions in Heraclea in Thrace. (Note: "At Heraclea, in Thrace, the holy martyrs Bassus, Denis, Agapitus and forty others.")
- Saint Isaac, Catholicos of Armenia (440)
- Saint Proclus of Constantinople, Archbishop of Constantinople (447)
- Venerable Gregory Decapolites (816) (Note: "At Constantinople, St. Gregory of Decapolis, who suffered many tribulations for the worship of holy images.")
- Venerable Theoctistus (Theoktistos) the Confessor, Patrician (855)

== Pre-Schism Western saints ==
- Martyrs Octavius, Solutor and Adventor, patron-saints of Turin in Italy where they were martyred (297) (Note: "At Turin, the holy martyrs Octavius, Solutor and Adventor, soldiers of the Theban Legion, who fought valiantly for the faith under the emperor Maximian, and were crowned with martyrdom.")
- Martyrs Ampelus and Gaius, in Messina in Sicily under Diocletian (c. 302) (Note: "At Messina, in Sicily, the holy martyrs Ampelus and Caius.")
- Saint Maxentia, born in Ireland, she settled as an anchoress near Senlis in France, where she was put to death at the place now called Pont-Sainte-Maxence (c. 450)
- Saint Benignus of Milan, Archbishop of Milan (c. 477) (Note: "At Milan, St. Benignus, a bishop, who, amidst the serious troubles caused by the barbarians, governed the church entrusted to him with the greatest constancy and piety.")
- Saint Silvester, Bishop of Châlons-sur-Saône in France (c. 525) (Note: "At Chalons, St. Silvester, a bishop, who went to God in the forty-second year of his priesthood, full of days and virtues." St Gregory of Tours describes him as 'the glory of confessors'.)
- Saint Simplicius of Verona, Bishop of Verona in Italy (c. 535) (Note: "At Verona, St. Simplicius, bishop and confessor.")
- Saint Eval (Uvol, Urfol), a Bishop in Cornwall (6th century) (Note: A village there is called after him.)
- Saint Autbodus (Autbod), born in Ireland, he preached in Artois, Hainault and Picardy in the north of France and Belgium (690)
- Saint Eudo (Eudon, Eudes Odo), a monk at Lérins Abbey in France, he founded the monastery of Corméry-en-Velay (Charmillac), later called Saint-Chaffre (c. 760)
- Saint Hippolyte of Belley, Bishop of Belley, then hermit in Saint-Claude in Franche-Comté (769) (Note: See: (in French) Hippolyte de Belley. Wikipédia. (French Wikipedia).)
- Saint Edmund the Martyr, King of East Anglia (869) (Note: King of East Anglia and first patron-saint of England. In 869 he was taken prisoner by the heathen Danes and savagely martyred at Hoxne in Suffolk. He died with the name of Jesus on his lips. Bury St Edmunds was named after him.)
- Saint Leo of Nonantula, monk and abbot of Nonantola Abbey near Modena in Italy (1000)
- Saint Bernward of Hildesheim, Bishop of Hildesheim in Germany (1022) (Note: He excelled as an architect, painter, sculptor, decorator and metalsmith. He was also a tutor of the half-Greek Emperor Otto III.)

== Post-Schism Orthodox saints ==
- Saint Sozomen (Sozomenos, Sozomonos), Bishop of Karpaseia in Cyprus, and Wonderworker (12th century) (see also: November 21)
- Venerable Diodorus, Founder and Igoumen (Abbot) of Yuriegorsk (George Hill) Monastery, Solovki (1633) (Note: See: (in Russian) Диодор Юрьегорский. Википедии. (Russian Wikipedia).)
- Saint Parasceva (Rodimtseva), Abbess of Toplovsky Convent, Simferopol (1928) (Note: See: (in Russian) Параскева Топловская. Википедии. (Russian Wikipedia).)

=== New martyrs and confessors ===
- New Hieromartyr Macarius (Karmazin), Bishop of Dnepropetrovsk (Ekaterinoslav) (1937) (Note: See: (in Russian) Макарий (Кармазин). Википедии. (Russian Wikipedia).)
- New Hieromartyrs Alexis Amanov, Alexander Sakharov, and Vladimir Medvediuk, (Note: See: (in Russian) Медведюк, Владимир Фаддеевич. Википедии. (Russian Wikipedia).) John Zabolotny, Alexis Nikatov, Basil Kandelabrov, Nicholas Zelenov, John Sarva, Emilian Panasevich, Nicholas Pokrovsky, Priests (1937)
- New Hieromartyr Arsenius (Dmitriev), abbot, of the Tikhvin Monastery (1937)
- New Hieromartyr Eutychius (Kachur), abbot, of the St. Marcian Skete, Ukraine (1937) (Note: See: (in Russian) Евтихий (Качур). Википедии. (Russian Wikipedia).)
- New Hieromartyr Hilarion (Pisarets), hieromonk of Glinsk Hermitage (1937) (Note: See: (in Russian) Иларион (Писарец). Википедии. (Russian Wikipedia).)
- New Nun-martyr Ioannikia (Kozhevnikova), Abbess of the Convent of the Entry of the Theotokos (Tikhvin) (1937)
- New Woman Hieromartyr Tatiana Fomicheva (after 1937) (Note: See: (in Russian) Татьяна (Фомичёва). Википедии. (Russian Wikipedia).)

== Icon gallery ==
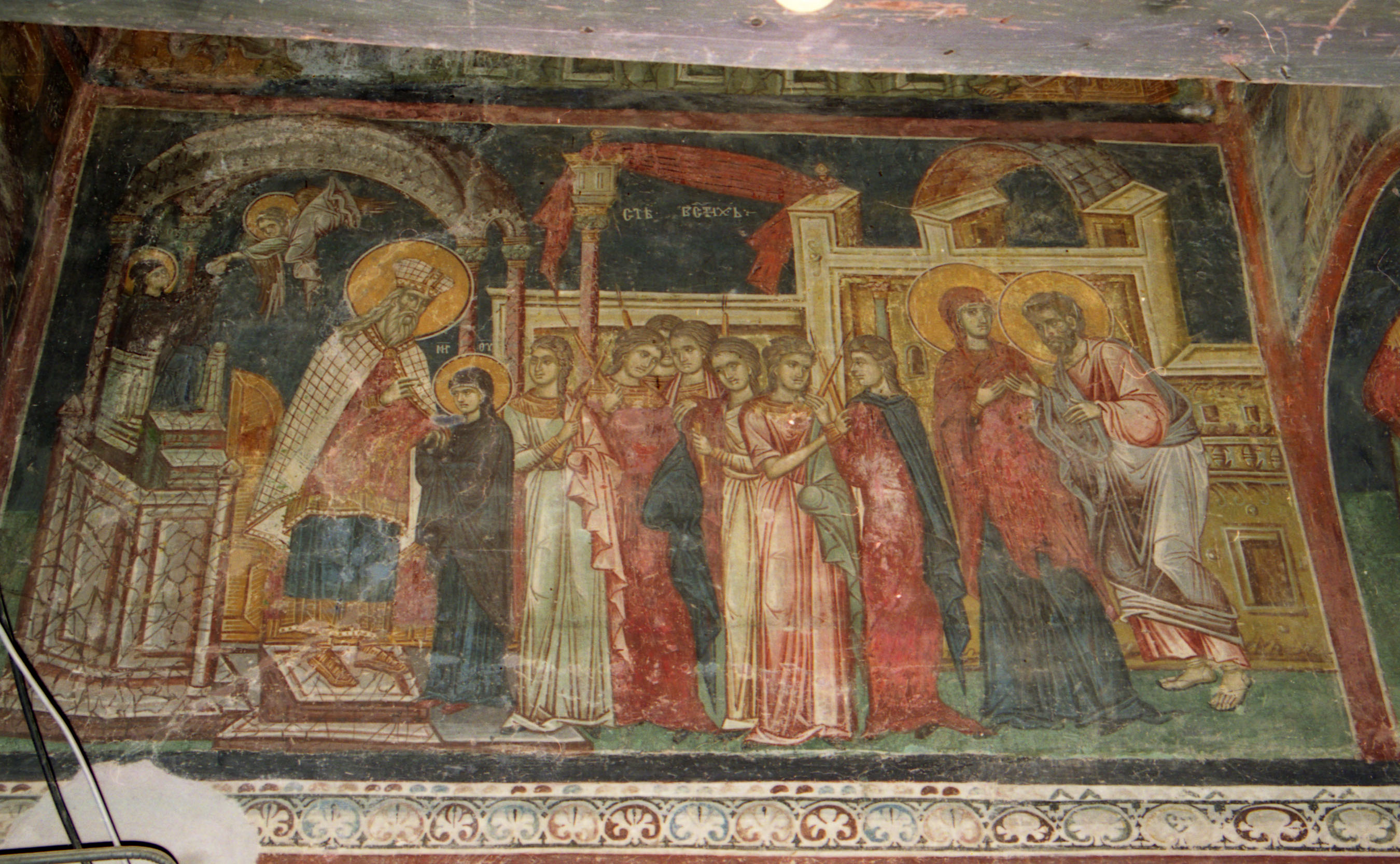
Entry into the Temple of the Most Holy Theotokos.

Martyr Dasius of Dorostolum, Romania.
(Menologion of Basil II, 10th century).

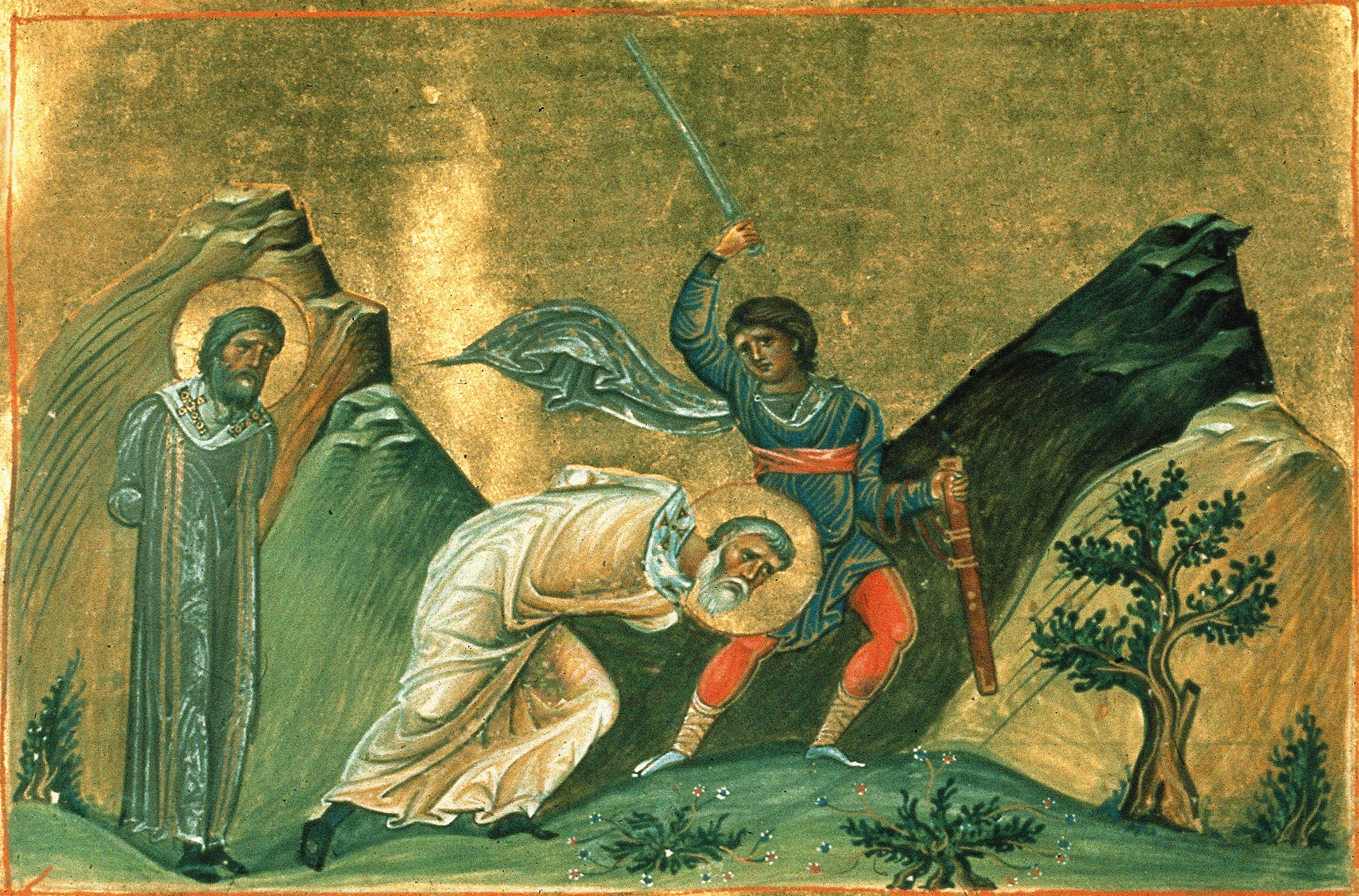
Hieromartyrs Nerses, Bishop of Shahrqart (Kirkuk) and his disciple Martyr Joseph.
(Menologion of Basil II, 10th century).

Hieromartyrs John, Shapur (Saborius, Severius), Isaac, Hypatius (Papias), Isaac and Jonam (Onam), Bishops of Persia.
(Menologion of Basil II, 10th century).

Martyrs Guhshtazad (Azades) the Eunuch, Anna of Persia, and many with them.
(Menologion of Basil II, 10th century).

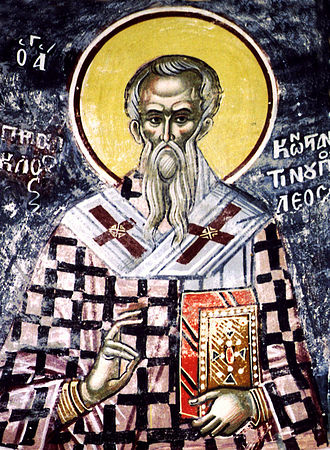
Saint Proclus of Constantinople.
(Saint Bessarion's Monastery, Trikala, Greece).

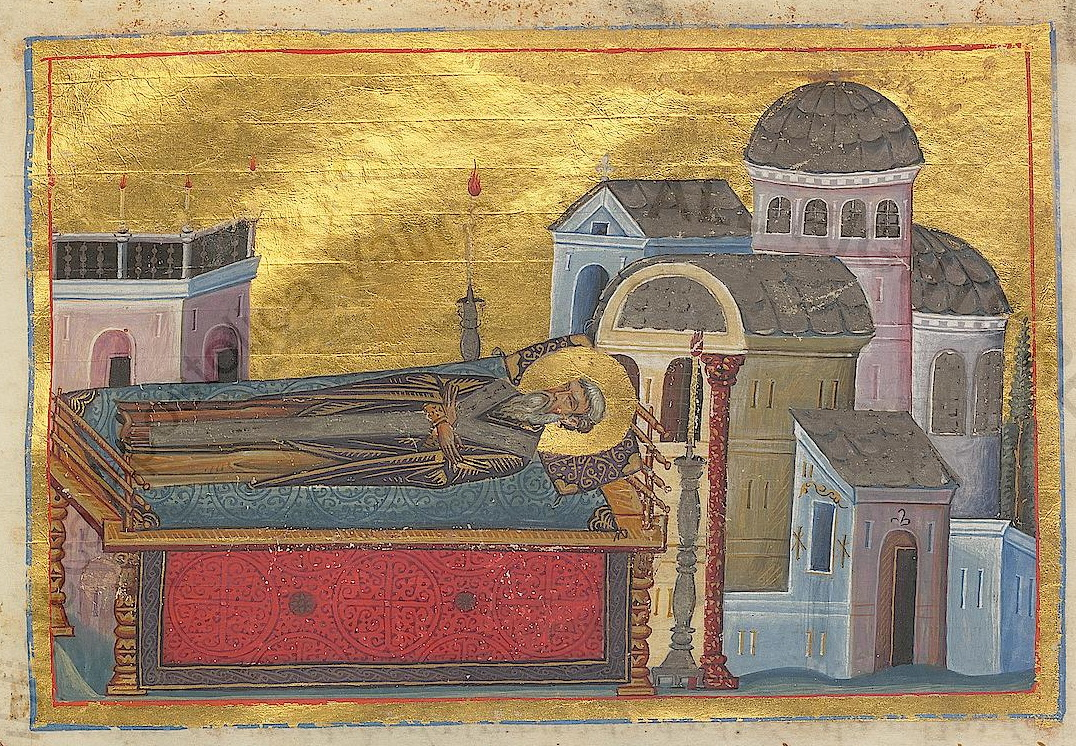
Saint Proclus of Constantinople.
(Menologion of Basil II, 10th century).

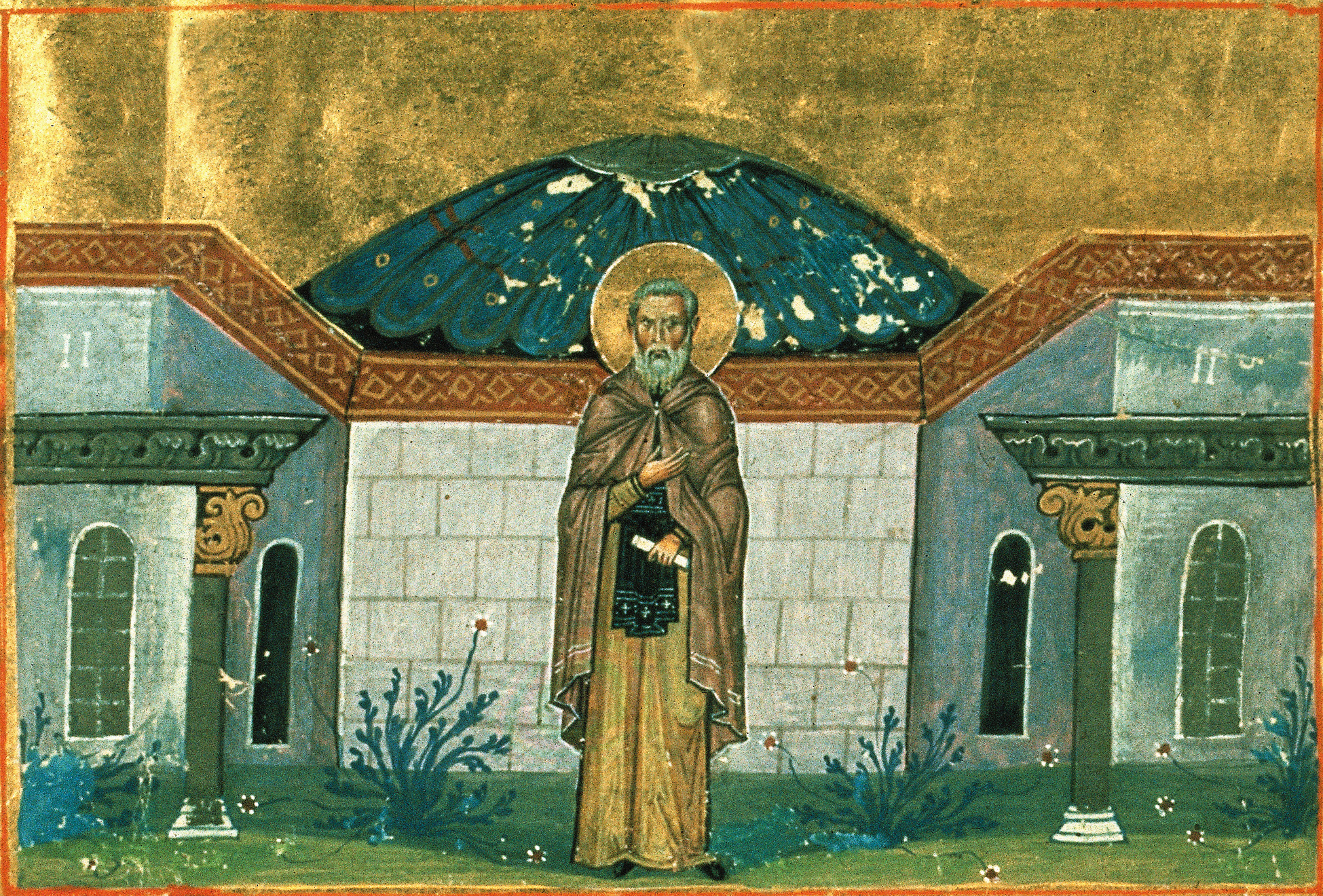
Venerable Gregory Decapolites.
(Menologion of Basil II, 10th century).

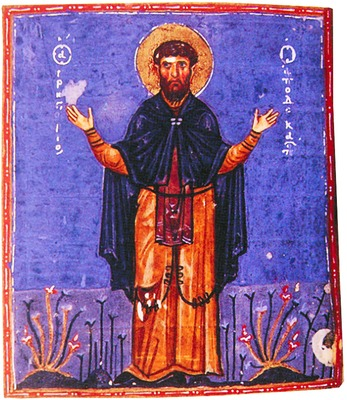
Venerable Gregory Decapolites.

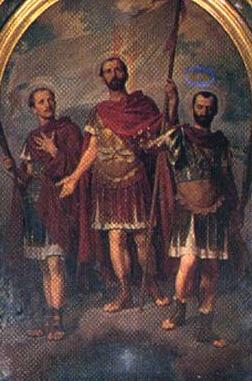
Martyrs Octavius, Solutor and Adventor.

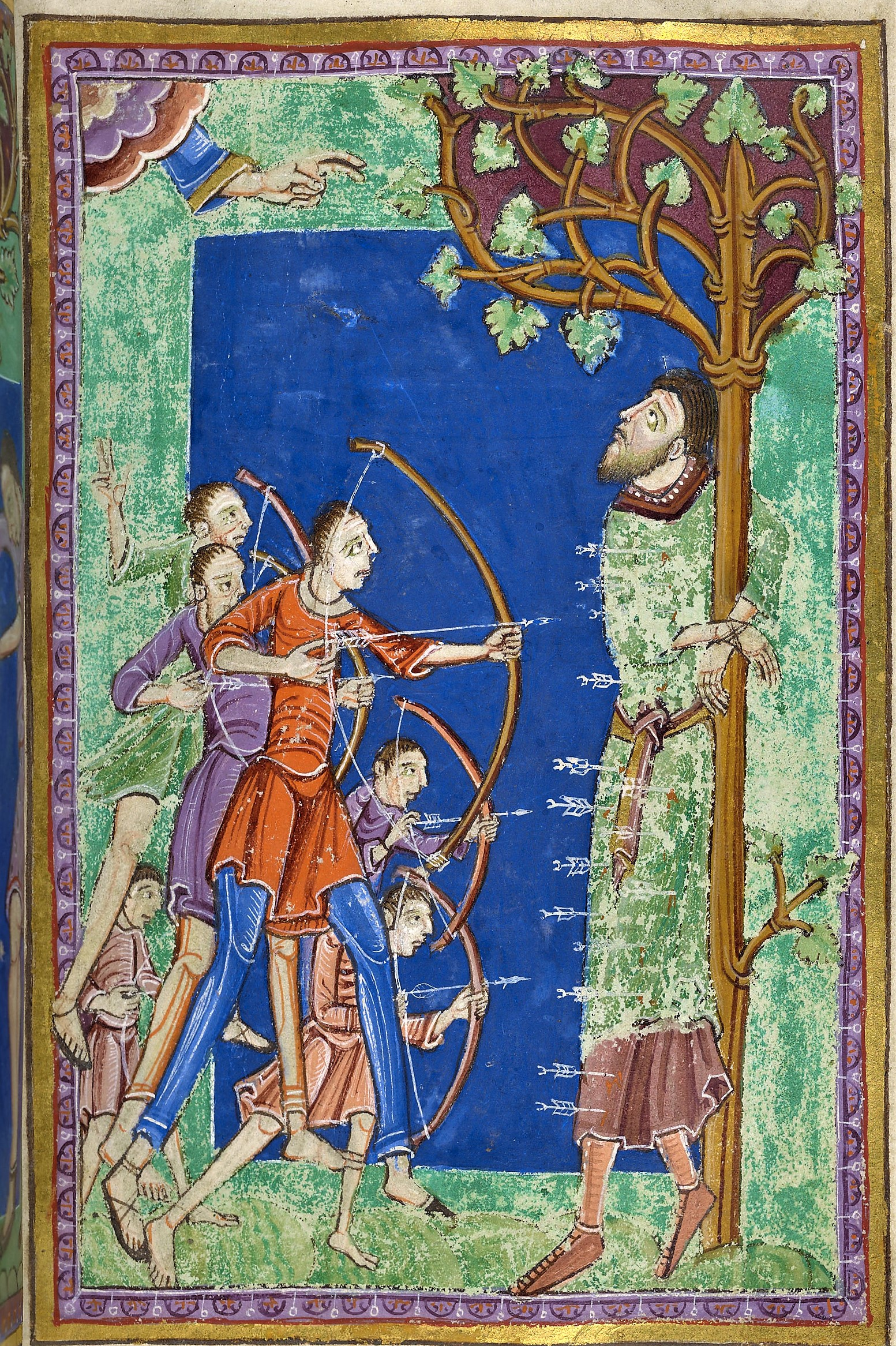
Saint Edmund the Martyr, King of East Anglia.

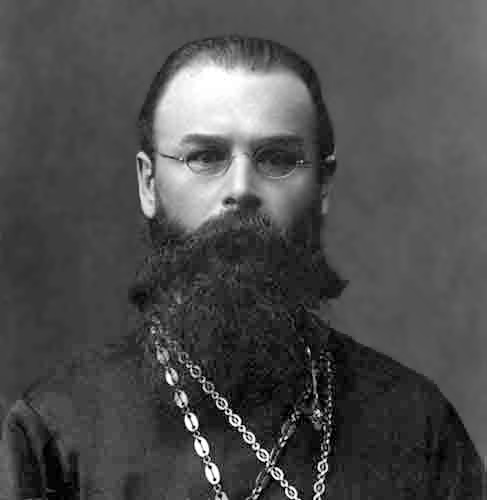
New Hieromartyr Macarius (Karmazin), Bishop of Ekaterinoslav.

New Hieromartyr Eutychius (Kachur), Abbot of the St. Marcian Skete, Ukraine.

New Hieromartyr Hilarion (Pisarets), Hieromonk of Glinsk Hermitage.

== Sources ==
- November 20 / December 3. Orthodox Calendar (PRAVOSLAVIE.RU).
- December 3 / November 20. Holy Trinity Russian Orthodox Church (A parish of the Patriarchate of Moscow).
- November 20. OCA - The Lives of the Saints.
- The Autonomous Orthodox Metropolia of Western Europe and the Americas (ROCOR). St. Hilarion Calendar of Saints for the year of our Lord 2004. St. Hilarion Press (Austin, TX). p. 87.
- The Twentieth Day of the Month of November. Orthodoxy in China.
- November 20. Latin Saints of the Orthodox Patriarchate of Rome.
- The Roman Martyrology. Transl. by the Archbishop of Baltimore. Last Edition, According to the Copy Printed at Rome in 1914. Revised Edition, with the Imprimatur of His Eminence Cardinal Gibbons. Baltimore: John Murphy Company, 1916. pp. 358–359.
- Rev. Richard Stanton. A Menology of England and Wales, or, Brief Memorials of the Ancient British and English Saints Arranged According to the Calendar, Together with the Martyrs of the 16th and 17th Centuries. London: Burns & Oates, 1892. pp. 559–561.

Greek Sources

- Great Synaxaristes: (in Greek) 20 ΝΟΕΜΒΡΙΟΥ. ΜΕΓΑΣ ΣΥΝΑΞΑΡΙΣΤΗΣ.
- (in Greek) Συναξαριστής. 20 Νοεμβρίου. ECCLESIA.GR. (H ΕΚΚΛΗΣΙΑ ΤΗΣ ΕΛΛΑΔΟΣ).
- (in Greek) November 20. Ορθόδοξος Συναξαριστής.

Russian Sources

- (in Russian) 3 декабря (20 ноября). Православная Энциклопедия под редакцией Патриарха Московского и всея Руси Кирилла (электронная версия). (Orthodox Encyclopedia - Pravenc.ru).
- (in Russian) 20 ноября по старому стилю / 3 декабря по новому стилю. Русская Православная Церковь - Православный церковный календарь на 2018 год.
