= Giovanni Ferrofino =

Catholic bishop

- Titular Bishop of Zenopolis in Isauria
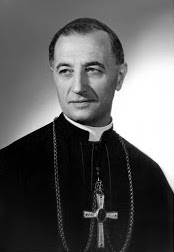
- Giovanni Ferrofino
- Church: Roman Catholic Church
- See: Zenopolis in Isauria
- In office: 1961–2010
- Predecessor: None
- Successor: Current
- Previous post(s): Apostolic Nuncio

Orders
- Ordination: 22 September 1933

Personal details
- Born: 24 February 1912; Alessandria, Italy
- Died: 20 December 2010 (aged 98)

Giovanni Ferrofino (24 February 1912 – 20 December 2010) was an Italian Archbishop of the Roman Catholic Church.

== Early life and ordination ==
Ferrofino was born in 1912 in the city of Alessandria in north-west Italy. On 22 September 1934 he was ordained a priest of the Diocese of Alessandria.

== Apostolic nuncio ==
On 8 February 1960 Ferrofino was appointed Apostolic Nuncio to Haiti. The following 28 November, 1961 he was appointed Titular Archbishop of Zenopolis in Isauria and ordained on 28 November 1961. Giovanni was appointed Apostolic Nuncio to Ecuador on 3 November 1965 and resigned from the position on 29 September 1970.

== Actions during the Second World War ==
During the Second World War, according to Gary Krupp of the Pave the Way Foundation, he personally acted on the direct orders of Pius XII twice a year to obtain visas for Jews arriving from Portugal to the Dominican Republic.

He traveled with the nuncio, archbishop Maurilio Silvani, to get 800 visas per boat load twice a year from 1939 to 1945 and appealed directly to General Rafael Trujillo in the name of Pius XII. This action, Krupp said, saved over 10,000 Jews who were then routed into America with the help of Monsignor Ferrofino through Cuba, Mexico and Canada.
