= Irenopolis (Isauria) =

Ancient city in Turkey

Coordinates: 36°28′52″N 32°53′58″E

Irenopolis or Eirenopolis or Eirenoupolis (Greek: Ειρηνούπολις) was an ancient and medieval city in Roman and Byzantine era Isauria.

== History ==
Located in the Calycadnus basin, it was part of the Decapolis of Isauria.

The city is mentioned by Hierocles in the sixth century and George of Cyprus in the seventh. It figures in the Notitia Episcopatuum of Anastasius, Patriarch of Antioch in the sixth century, and in the Descriptio Orbis Romani by George of Cyprus (7th century). and in the Nova Tactica of the 10th century, as attached to the Patriarchate of Constantinople.

At this period, the Byzantine emperors had taken the province of Isauria from the Patriarchate of Antioch.

== Location ==
W. M. Ramsay, following John Sterrett, identifies Irenopolis with Irnebol, of which he does not indicate the exact situation.

It actually corresponds to the existing villages of Çatalbadem (formerly Yukarı İrnebol meaning "Irenopolis from above") and İkizçınar (formerly Aşağı İrnebol meaning "Irenopolis from below"), in the district of Ermenek, Karaman Province .

== Bishopric ==
The city was the seat of an ancient bishopric. Five of its bishops are known:

- John (325)
- Menodorus (451)
- Paul (458)
- George (692)
- Euschemon (878).

In 1915 the diocese was in name re-established as a titular see. there have been six titular bishops:

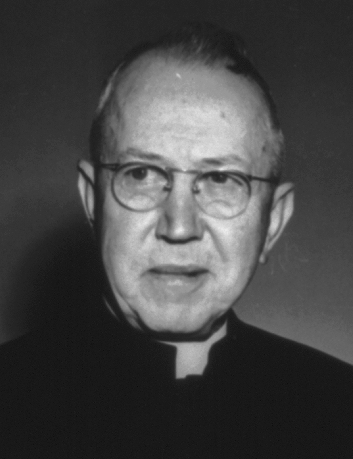
Cardinal Edward Mooney

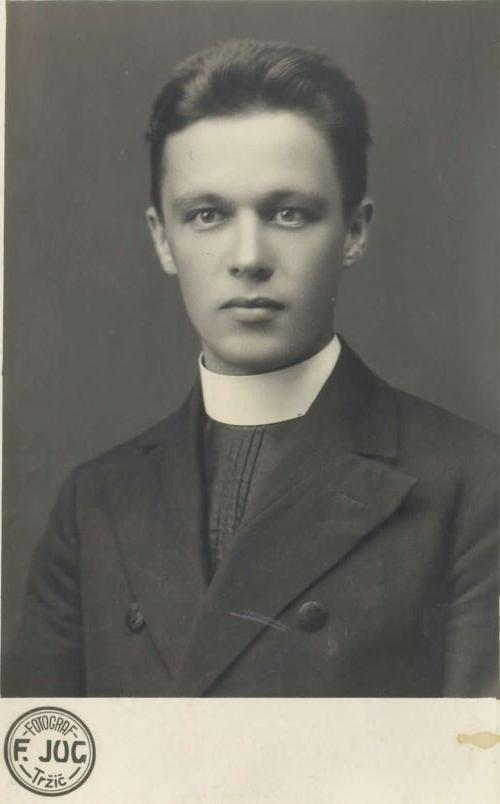
Jožef Pogačnik 1920s

- Giuseppe Ridolfi (1915–1925)
- Edward Aloysius Mooney (1926–1933)
- Paul-Marie Richaud (1933–1938)
- Jean-Germain Mousset (문제만 제르마노), (1938–1957)
- James Vincent Pardy (파 야고보), (1958–1962)
- Jožef Pogačnik (1963–1964)
- George Alapatt (1970–1971)

== Coins ==
Coins found bearing the name Irenopolis belong rather to a city of the same name located in Cilicia, the ancient Neronias, some of whose bishops are also known.

== Notable people ==
The 9th century monk and saint Gregory of Decapolis was born in the city.
