= Dometiopolis =

Ancient city in Cilicia, southern Asia Minor

Coordinates: 36°45′03″N 32°45′14″E

Dometiopolis (Ancient Greek: Δομετιούπολις) or Domitiopolis (Δομητιούπολις) was a city of Cilicia Trachea, and in the later Roman province of Isauria in Asia Minor. Its ruins are found in the village of Katranlı (formerly Dindebul), Ermenek, Karaman Province, Turkey.

== History ==
The city, whose previous name is unknown, was named Dometiopolis (Greek: Δομετιούπολις) after Lucius Domitius Ahenobarbus (consul 16 BC). John Malalas though writes about a city called Domitianoupolis and was built by Domitian. According to Constantine Porphyrogenitus, it was one of the ten cities of the Isaurian Decapolis.

== Episcopal see ==
The episcopal see of Dometiopolis is mentioned in Gustav Parthey's Notitiæ episcopatuum, I and III, and in Heinrich Gelzer's Nova Tactica, 1618, as a suffragan of Seleucia. Lequien (Oriens Christianus II, 1023) mentions five bishops, from 451 to 879.

It remains a titular see of the Catholic Church, sometimes under the spelling "Domitiopolis".
