= Dometius of Persia =

Christian martyr and saint

Saint Dometius the Persian
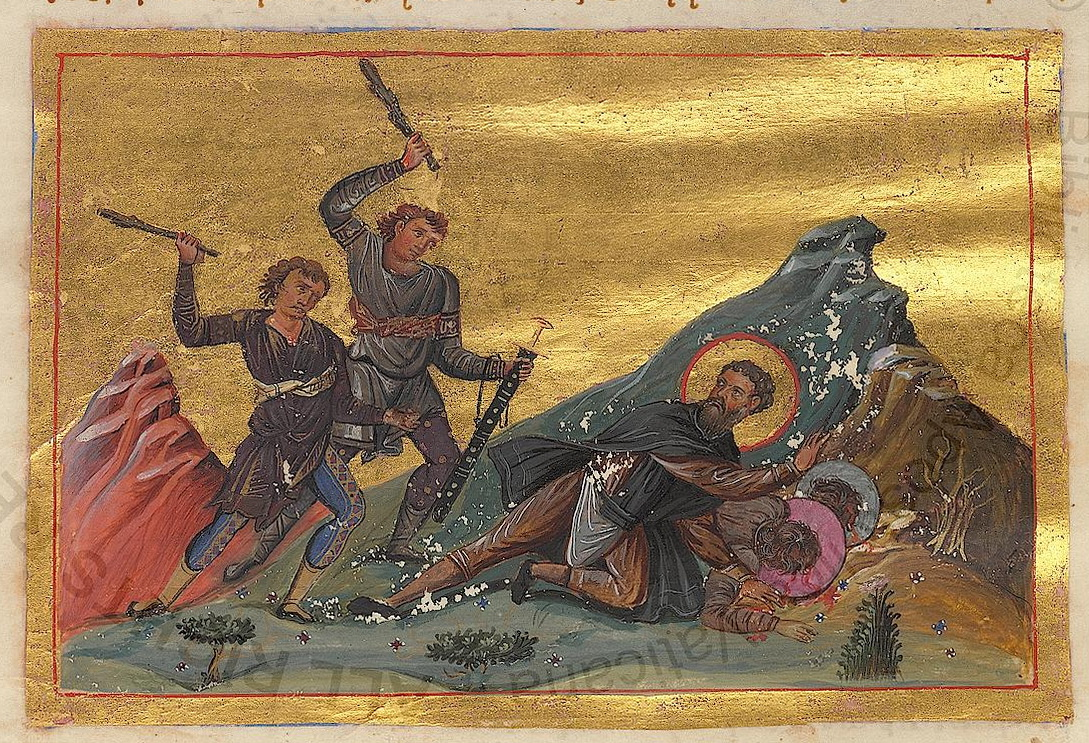
- Martyrdom of St. Dometius and his two disciples. From the Menologion of Basil II.

Martyr
- Died: 363; Nisibis, Mesopotamia
- Feast: August 7
- Patronage: invoked against sciatica

Saint Dometius (Domitius) the Persian (died 363) is venerated as a Christian martyr and saint. According to tradition, he was martyred by lapidation during the reign of Julian the Apostate with two companions. He was killed at Nisibis in Mesopotamia.

The name Domitius appears three times in the Roman Martyrology on different feast days (August 7, March 23, July 5); "it is uncertain that they were indeed the same person."

Dometius of Persia was depicted in an 8th-century fresco in the church of Santa Maria Antiqua, in Rome. This may indicate that there were Greek-speaking monks at Santa Maria Antiqua, as evidenced by these frescoes, which not only depicted Dometius but also Saints Barachisius, Euthymius, and Sabas of Palestine.
