= Isaurian Decapolis =

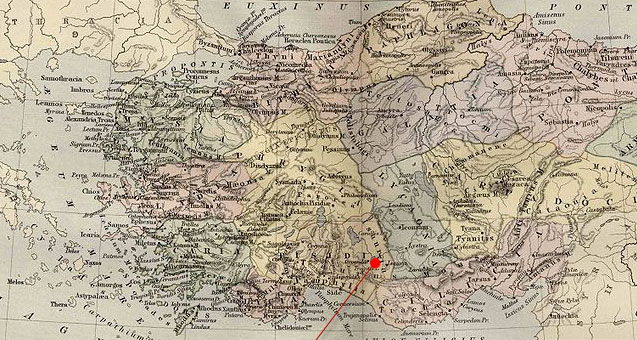
Location of Isauria in Asia Minor

The Isaurian Decapolis was a group of ten cities (Greek: Δεκάπολις) in ancient and medieval Isauria. According to the De Thematibus of the 10th-century Byzantine emperor Constantine VII Porphyrogennetos, the Decapolis comprised the inland portions of Isauria, with the cities of Germanicopolis, Titiopolis, Dometiopolis, Zenopolis, Neapolis, Claudiopolis, Irenopolis, Diocaesarea, Lauzadus and Dalisandus.
