= İkizçınar, Ermenek =

Village in Karaman Province, Turkey

İkizçınar
- Village
- Location within Turkey Location within Turkey Central Anatolia
- Country: Turkey
- Province: Karaman
- District: Ermenek
- Population (2022): 244
- Time zone: UTC+3 (TRT)

İkizçınar is a village in Ermenek District, Karaman Province, Central Anatolia, Turkey. Its population is 244 (2022).

The village dates from Roman times and was formerly known as İrnebol and in ancient time as Irenopolis.

The nearby village of Çatalbadem was formerly known as Yukarı İrnebol meaning "upper Irenopolis" and İkizçınar was formerly Aşağı İrnebol meaning "Irenopolis from below".

The village is known for its almond trees.
