= Nicholas Bjerring =

Nicholas Bjerring (June 14, 1831 - September 10, 1900) was a Danish Roman Catholic convert who briefly converted to Eastern orthodoxy becoming the first Orthodox Christian priest to establish an Orthodox church and community in the northeastern United States. However he later left Eastern Orthodoxy and reconverted to Catholicism. He published translations into English of a number of books and articles concerning the Orthodox faith and services.

== Biography ==
Nicholas Bjerring was born in 1831 in Vejle, Denmark, where his father was an official. Bjerring was educated in Vejle and studied philosophy and theology in the University of Breslau. He was active in the Roman Catholic schools in Europe and performed missionary work in Lapland. In 1868, he came to the United States to be a teacher at St. Alphonsus in Baltimore, Maryland. It has been mistakenly thought that he was a professor of philosophy and history at St. Mary's Roman Catholic Seminary in Baltimore, Maryland, but he never actually taught at that seminary. He married while still a Roman Catholic and was the father of three children when he was received into the Orthodox Church.

Bjerring left the Roman Catholic Church in 1870 in protest of the adoption of the dogma of papal infallibility, stating his position on a letter of January 24, 1870 to Pope Pius IX. Nicholas Bjerring had become interested in Orthodox Christianity through the scholarly journal L'Union Chrétienne. After careful consideration, in early 1870 he petitioned the Holy Synod to be received into the Orthodox Church. Receiving his letter, the Synod requested him to appear in person before them. On May 3, 1870, he was received into the Orthodox Church in ceremonies in the chapel of the St. Petersburg Academy. He was then ordained to the diaconate on May 6 and to the priesthood on May 9 by Metropolitan Isodore (Nikolsky) of St. Petersburg and Novgorod. Bjerring served his first liturgy in German on May 17 in the academy chapel. He was then directed to establish a church in New York City.

In the meantime, in 1864, Rev. Dr. John Young Freeman had visited Metropolitan Philaret Drozdov of Moscow on behalf of the Russo-Greek Committee of the Protestant Episcopal Church. This meeting dealt with establishment of an Orthodox center in the northeastern United States which could provide a place for Orthodox rites to be experienced in the proper setting. The assignment of Fr. Nicholas to New York was fortuitous and appeared to have supported Rev. Freeman’s request.

Bjerring served the chapel of the Holy Trinity in New York until 1883, when funding was removed from the mission and he was requested to return to Russia to teach at St. Petersburg Academy. Rather than accept such a prestigious offer, Bjerring desired to remain in America and began exploring where to transfer his ecclesiastical affiliation. In 1883, he decided to join the Presbyterian Church and was subsequently received as a pastor (though after some debate). Although little is known about this period of his life, he engaged in social ministry to Germans living in tenement housing (an act consistent with work he had begun amongst Russians in 1881). The Presbyterian Church would later remove the funding from his mission and he returned to the Roman Catholic Church in 1899.

Regardless, in 1899 and early 1900 he published articles in Catholic World in which he clearly cites religious convictions for returning to the Roman Catholic Church and discussed the labor question. He died in September 1900 as a Roman Catholic layman.

== Sources ==
This article incorporates text from Nicholas Bjerring at OrthodoxWiki which is licensed under the CC-BY-SA and GFDL.

- Herbel, [Fr.] Oliver. "A Catholic, Presbyterian, and Orthodox Journey: The Changing Church Affiliation and Enduring Social Vision of Nicholas Bjerring" Journal for the History of Modern Theology/Zeitschrift für Neuere Theologiegeschichte 14:1 (2007): 49-80.
- Orthodox America 1794-1976 Development of the Orthodox Church in America, C. J. Tarasar, Gen. Ed. 1975, The Orthodox Church in America, Syosett, New York
