= Zenopolis (Isauria) =

Ancient Roman and Byzantine city in Isauria

Coordinates: 36°41′59″N 32°41′26″E

Zenopolis (Ancient Greek: Ζηνούπολις) was an ancient Roman and Byzantine city in Isauria. Its site is located near Elmayurdu in Asiatic Turkey.

== History ==
This city was the birthplace of Emperor Zeno (474–491), and was renamed in his honour. Its previous name was Rusumblada, according to Ramsay, but the author of the entry on Rusumblada in Paulys Real-Encyclopaedie der classischen Altertumswissenschaft considers this uncertain. Its modern name is Isnebol. George of Cyprus mentioned it in the 7th century, as did Constantine Porphyrogenitus in the 10th century, as a city of the Isaurian Decapolis.

== Bishopric ==
The city is recorded as a bishopric in the 6th-century Notitia Episcopatuum of the Patriarchate of Antioch, but in about 732 Isauria was attached to the Patriarchate of Constantinople.

Le Quien mentions two bishops:

- Eulalius (Εὐλάλιος ἐπίσκοπος Ζενοπόλεως Ἰσαυρίας), at the Third Council of Constantinople (681)
- Marcus, at the Second Council of Nicaea (787)

The Catholic Church's list of titular sees continues to include the see as Zenopolis in Isauria. Past titular Bishops include:

- Luke Wadding (26 Aug 1671 Appointed - 23 Aug 1678)
- Luigi Moccagatta, (3 Mar 1844 Appointed - 6 Sep 1891)
- Francesco Albino Symon (17 Dec 1891 Appointed - 2 Aug 1897)
- Engelberto Voršak (24 Mar 1898 Appointed - 22 Aug 1921)
- Stefan Walczykiewicz (20 Jul 1928 Appointed - 12 May 1940)
- Jean-Baptiste Castanier,(29 Nov 1940 Appointed - 12 Mar 1943)
- Anton Scharnagl (10 Apr 1943 Appointed - 19 Jan 1955)
- Jacques Henri Romeijn,(10 Jul 1955 Appointed - 3 Jan 1961)
- Giovanni Ferrofino (28 Oct 1961 Appointed - 20 Dec 2010)
