= Alexander Hotovitzky =

Russian Orthodox Hieromartyr

Saint Alexander Hotovitzky
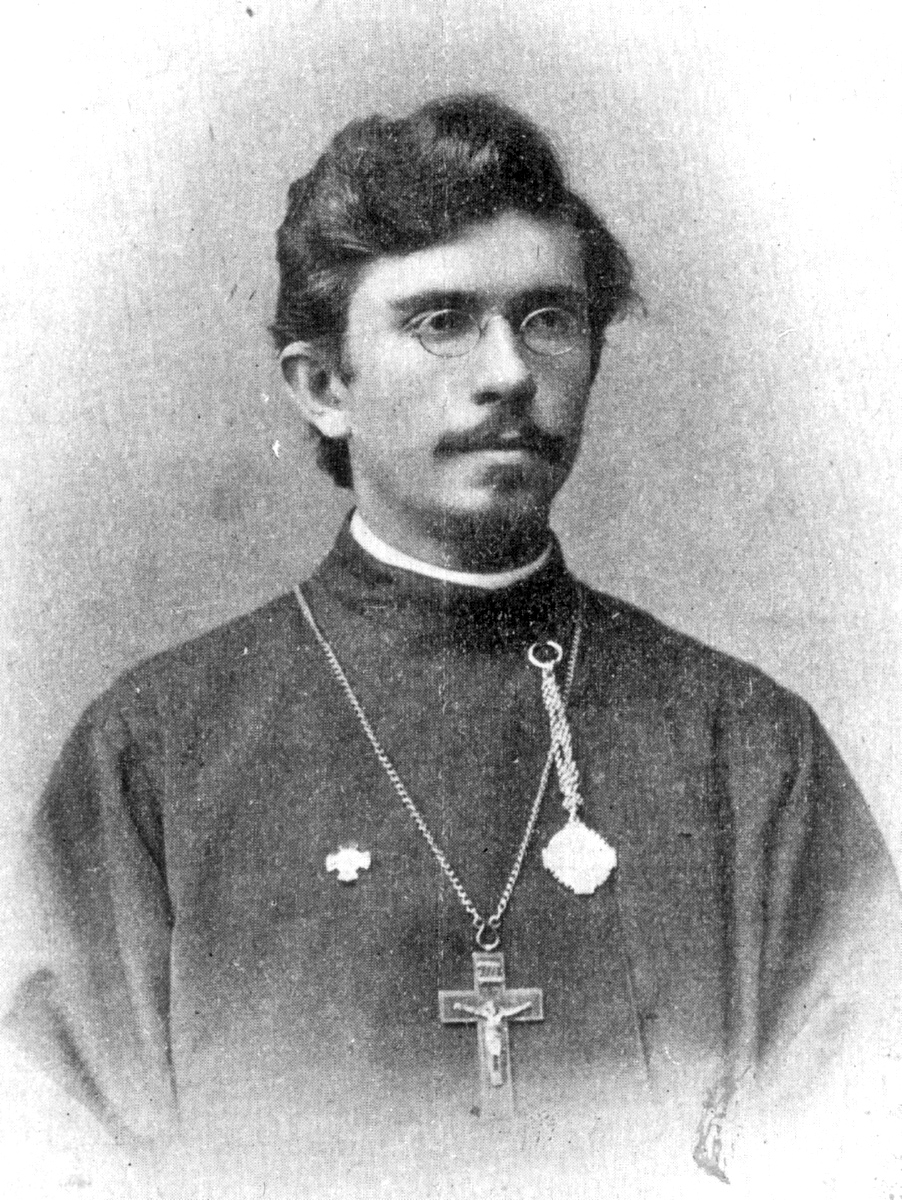
- Photograph taken before 1909

Hieromartyr
- Born: February 11, 1872; Kremenetz, Volhynia, Russia
- Died: August 19, 1937 (aged 65)
- Venerated in: Eastern Orthodox Church
- Canonized: 1994
- Feast: November 21 (Church calendar); December 4 (Civil calendar)

Alexander Hotovitzky (or Hotovitsky; Russian: Алекса́ндр Алекса́ндрович Хотови́цкий; 1872–1937) was a Ukrainian Orthodox hieromartyr.

He was ordained to the priesthood while working in the United States in the 1890s. He was ordered back to Europe in 1914, where he worked as a vicar in Berlin and Helsinki, in the Grand Duchy of Finland, an autonomous part of the Russian Empire. In 1917 he was assigned to Christ the Savior Cathedral in Moscow. After the October Revolution he was arrested multiple times and exiled. He was executed during the Great Purge on August 19, 1937.

His glorification is celebrated on 21 November in the Church Calendar, December 4 in the Civil Calendar.

== Early life and education ==
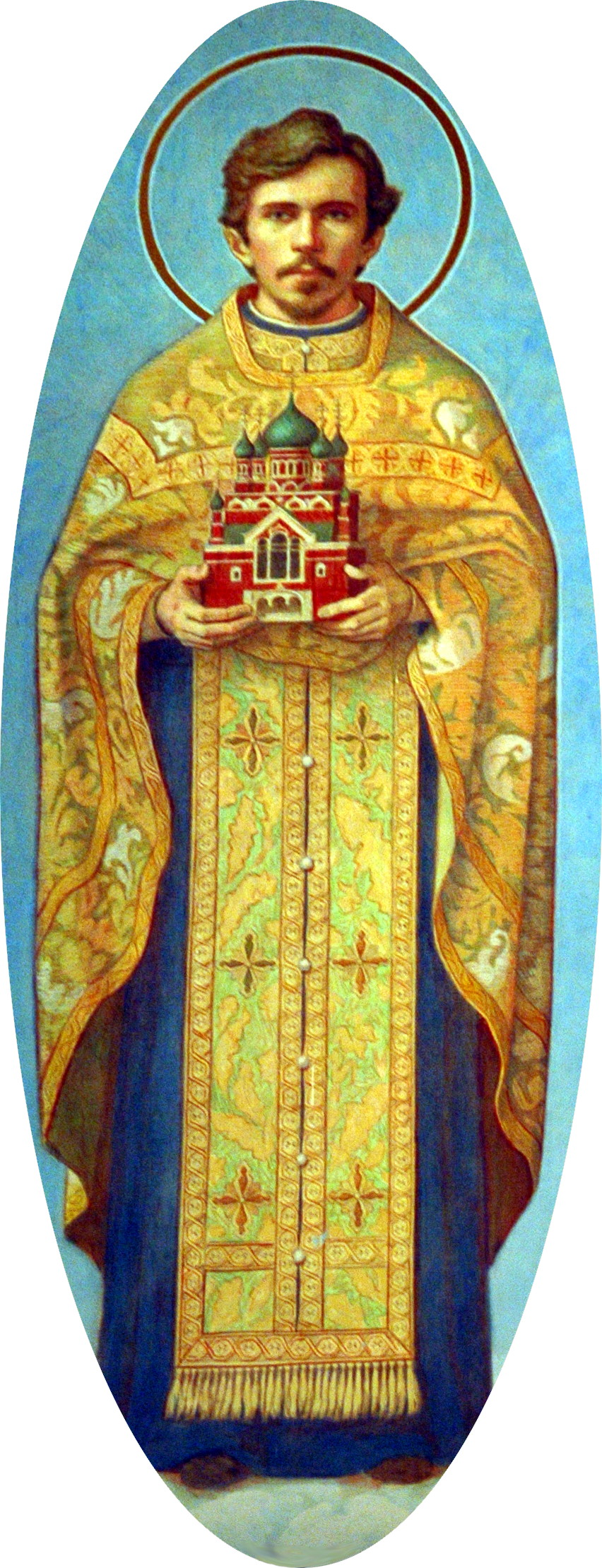
Altar fresco of Saint Alexander Hotovitzky in Russian St. Nicholas Cathedral (New York, NY)

Alexander Hotovitzky was born on February 11, 1872, in the city of Kremenets in Volhynia, Ukraine. His father, Alexander, was a priest who was the rector of the Volhynia Theological Seminary. Hotovitzky was educated at the Volhynia Seminary before entering the St. Petersburg Theological Academy.

== Work in the United States ==
Upon graduation from the academy in 1895 with a master's degree he was sent to the Diocese of the Aleutians and North America as a lay missionary and as reader at the St. Nicholas Church in New York City. He was ordained a deacon after his marriage to Maria Scherbuhina, who was a graduate of the Pavlovsk Institute of St. Petersburg. Bishop Nicholas Ziorov ordained Hotovitzky to the priesthood on February 25, 1896, at the diocesan cathedral in San Francisco.

A week later he returned to New York to become the pastor of St. Nicholas Church. During the ensuing years, Hotovitzky worked on his missionary activities among the immigrants from Galicia and Carpatho-Russia, as well as representing the Orthodox Church before American religious institutions and meetings. He was instrumental in the establishment of many new Orthodox parishes, including those in Yonkers, Passaic, Philadelphia, and Watervliet. He also served in Canada.

He edited the journal of Orthodox activity, the American Orthodox Messenger. He actively participated in establishing an Orthodox mutual aid society (ROCMAS), including serving in various management positions. Through his initiative and active participation, a new St. Nicholas Cathedral was built to replace the small parish church in New York City. He traveled throughout the United States, and even to Russia, soliciting funds for its construction. Tzar Nicholas contributed 5,000 rubles. The cathedral was consecrated on 23 November 1902.

In 1907 he became the first priest at the new Saints Peter & Paul Church in New Jersey.

The treaty to end the Russo-Japanese War was negotiated and signed in Portsmouth, New Hampshire in 1905. Hotovitzky was among the Orthodox clergy who traveled to Portsmouth for the occasion, where a service of Thanksgiving was held in Christ Church. Hotovitzky sang a solemn "Te Deum" with choristers from St. Nicholas Cathedral.

He served in America for eighteen years under Bishop Nicholas; the future Patriarch of Moscow, Tikhon; and Archbishop Platon. The now Archpriest Alexander was recalled to Russia on February 26, 1914.

== Russia and martyrdom ==
After his return to the Russian Empire, Hotovitzky was appointed rector of the Orthodox congregation in Helsinki; then a part of the Russian Empire, now Finland. Here, as assistant to the archbishop of Finland, Sergius (Stragorodsky), later Patriarch Sergius I of Moscow, he worked against the proselytizing activities of the Finnish Lutheran majority.

In August 1917 he was transferred to Christ the Savior Church in Moscow as an assistant priest to once again serve under his former archpastor from America, Patriarch Tikhon. He arrived just before the All-Russian Church Council of 1917-1918 and the October Revolution. He was an active participant in the Church Council and assisted Tikhon in the administration of the Moscow diocese. With the loss of state funding, the church and the cathedral had to look to other sources of funds.

Hotovitzky's activities within the church led to his arrest by the Bolsheviks for brief periods in May 1920 and November 1921 for violating government decrees concerning religion. Hotovitzky, with Nicholas Arseniev, the rector of Christ the Savior Cathedral, aided the establishment of a brotherhood that appealed to the Orthodox community to defend and preserve the Cathedral, and to aid the starving. In 1922, Church property, including icons and sacred vessels, were confiscated by the government, allegedly to help the poor and starving. Tikhon issued a decree based on canon law that the clergy in Russia were not to surrender sacred vessels for non-ecclesiastical use.

Hotovitzky was in the forefront of those who implemented the Patriarch's instructions. He took part in meetings to draft a resolution for a general parish meeting of Christ the Savior parish about the state decrees. This resolution, drafted by Hotovitzky, was presented at a general meeting of the parish by Archpriest Nicholas Arseniev on March 23, 1922. Hotovitzky had already been placed under arrest. The final resolution contained demands of guarantees from the state that all donations from the church would be used to alleviate hunger. However, the drafting of this resolution was considered a further example of counter-revolutionary activity. A new high-visibility trial was convened in Moscow on November 27, 1922, during which 105 clergy and laity were accused of "attempting to retain in their hands possession of church valuables and, through the resulting starvation, to topple the Soviet Regime."

In this trial the state prosecution portrayed Hotovitzky as a central figure in the activities surrounding the preparation of the resolution. Under questioning, Hotovitzky did not admit to wrongdoing and tried to protect the other defendants. In his final words as a defendant, Hotovitzky defended the meeting as an ordinary meeting without any counter-revolutionary intent. On December 13, 1922, the verdicts were announced. The penalties were milder than earlier verdicts. Hotovitzky and two others were given ten-year sentences in prison, loss of their personal property, and loss of civil rights for five years. The others were given lesser sentences, but appeals for pardons were turned down by the Supreme Central Executive Committee on February 16, 1923.

In October 1923, Hotovitzky and others were granted amnesty. Hotovitzky was not assigned to a parish but served by invitation in Moscow churches. On September 4, 1924, the State Political Directorate recommended administrative exile of thirteen clergy and church leaders, including Hotovitzky. After further interrogation, Hotovitzky was exiled to the northern Turukhan region of Siberia for three years. After his return from exile, he was elevated to the rank of protopresbyter and was assigned as an assistant to the Deputy Locum-Tenens of the Patriarchal Throne, Metropolitan Sergius. In the 1930s, he went on to serve as rector of the Church of the Deposition of the Robe.

In the summer of 1937, Hotovitzky was again arrested. He was sentenced to death and shot on August 19, 1937. Hotovitzky is buried in Donskoye Cemetery in Moscow.

== Legacy ==
The crypt chapel of the Uspenski Cathedral in Helsinki is today named after him.

The City of Jersey City, New Jersey, designated a one-block portion of Grand Street in front of the Sts. Peter and Paul Orthodox Cathedral as Saint Alexander Hotovitzky Way.

He was recognised by Metropolitan Theophilus Pashkovsky as one of the four pillars of the Russian Orthodox Church in America, along with Bishop Nicholas Bjerring, Father John Kochurov and Father John Nedzelnitsky.

== Veneration ==
Hotovitsky is celebrated in the Russian and Greek Orthodox Churches on December 4.

== See also ==
- Neo-martyr

== Sources ==
- Alexis Liberovsky, Ed., The Life of Saint Alexander Hotovitzky, New Hieromartyr of Russia, Missionary to America, Alive in Christ, 1995-2, (Fall 1995). P. 11—15
