= Sergius and Herman of Valaam =

Greek missionary and saint

Saints Sergius and Herman of Valaam
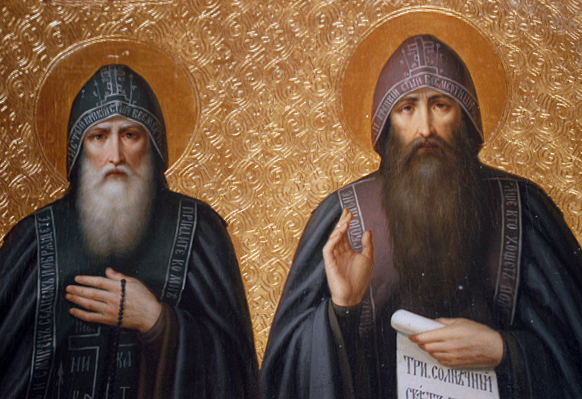
- Early 20th-century icon depicting St. Sergius and St. Herman of Valaam.
- Born: 10th century / 14th century
- Venerated in: Eastern Orthodox Church
- Major shrine: Valaam Monastery
- Feast: 28 June

Sergius and Herman of Valaam (Russian: Сергий Валаамский and Russian: Герман Валаамский) were Orthodox monks who are traditionally regarded as the founders of Valaam Monastery, and associated with the Christianization of the Karelians and Finns. The historical details of their lives remain uncertain, with traditions placing them either in the 10th century or in the 14th century. Their feast day is celebrated on 28 June.

== Life ==
The historical details of the lives of Sergius and Herman remain uncertain due to the scarcity of early written sources. The earliest known hagiographical accounts concerning Sergius and Herman belong to a much later period, making the reconstruction of their biographies difficult.

According to the traditional account, Sergius was a Greek monk who lived in the 10th century and, together with Herman, is traditionally credited with founding the monastic community that later became Valaam Monastery. However, the historical dating of his life remains disputed. A note preserved in a late 16th-century manuscript collection of the Cathedral of Saint Sophia, Novgorod, states: "In the year 6837 (1329), the elder Sergius came to Valaam." This record has led some researchers to associate Sergius with the 14th century rather than the earlier traditional dating.

The exact circumstances of the monastery's foundation remain uncertain, as many records concerning its early history have been lost, including during the Russo-Swedish Wars. The earliest surviving written records mentioning the monastery date only from the 16th century. While earlier traditions attributed its foundation to Sergius and Herman in the 10th century, modern historians generally place the emergence of the monastery in the late 14th century. John H. Lind and Michael C. Paul have suggested a foundation date between 1389 and 1393, based on sources including the Tale of the Valamo Monastery, a 16th-century manuscript which states that the monastery was founded during the archiepiscopate of Ioann II of Novgorod.

The Finnish Orthodox Church venerates Sergius and Herman as saints and as Karelian enlighteners. Their feast day is celebrated annually on 28 June.

== See also ==
- Stephen of Perm
- Herman of Alaska

== Sources ==
- "Герман, основатель Валаамского монастыря" . Brockhaus and Efron Encyclopedic Dictionary (in Russian). 1906.
- "Сергий, основатель Валаамского монастыря" . Brockhaus and Efron Encyclopedic Dictionary (in Russian). 1906.
