= July 12 (Eastern Orthodox liturgics) =

Day in the Eastern Orthodox liturgical calendar

Eastern Orthodox liturgical calendar
July 11	July 12	July 13
July 12 O.S. ≍ July 25 N.S. July 12 N.S ≍ June 29 O.S.

An Eastern Orthodox cross

July 12 in Eastern Orthodox liturgical calendars is a feast day and a day of commemoration of saints and martyrs. Although some Orthodox churches use the Revised Julian Calendar and others use the traditional Julian calendar, the fixed commemorations for their respective July 12 are broadly the same, no matter which calendar is used. (Note: Despite the dates being the same, the days to which they refer typically differ by 13 days. The notation Old Style or O.S. is sometimes used to indicate a date in the traditional Julian Calendar (the "Old Calendar"). The notation New Style or N.S. indicates a date in the Revised Julian calendar (the "New Calendar").)

== Saints ==
- Saint Veronica, the woman with the issue of blood who was healed by the Savior (1st century) (Note: Name days celebrated today include: Veronica, Berenice (Βερονίκη).)
- Martyr Serapion the New, at Alexandria (194-211) (see also: July 13)
- Martyrs Proclus and Hilary, of Ancyra (2nd century) (Note: "The same day, the Saints Proclus and Hilarion, who won the palm of martyrdom after most bitter torments, in the time of the emperor Trajan and the governor Maximus.")
- Martyrs Andrew the Commander, Heraclius, Faustus, Menas, and those with them. (see also: August 31)
- Great-martyr Mamas, whose synaxis near Sigma we celebrate. (Note: He may be the same saint as the martyr on September 2.)
- Martyr Golinduc, in holy baptism Mary, of Persia (591) (see also: July 13)
- Venerables John (998) and Gabriel (10th century) of Georgia and Iveron, Mt. Athos.
- Venerable Michael Maleinus, spiritual father of Saint Athanasius of Athos (962)
- Martyrs Theodore of Kiev and his son John, the Varangians, at Kiev (983)

== Pre-Schism Western saints ==
- Saint Hermagoras of Aquileia, and his deacon Fortunatus, martyrs under Nero (c.66) (Note: According to tradition, St Hermagoras was a disciple of the Apostle Mark and was consecrated first Bishop of Aquileia in Italy. After a fruitful apostolate he and his deacon Fortunatus were beheaded under Nero.) (Note: "At Aquileia, the birthday of St. Hermagoras, disciple of the blessed evangelist Mark, and first bishop of that city. Whilst occupied in performing miraculous cures, in preaching frequently and bringing souls to repentance, he suffered many kinds of torments, and finally by capital punishment, merited an immortal triumph with his deacon Fortunatus.")
- Saint Paulinus of Antioch, and Companions (c. 67) (Note: Venerated as the first bishop and patron-saint of Lucca in Tuscany in Italy. By tradition he was born in Antioch and sent to Lucca by the Apostle Peter where he was martyred with others.) (Note: "At Lucca, in Tuscany, blessed Paulinus, who was consecrated first bishop of that city by St. Peter. Under Nero, after many combats, he terminated his martyrdom with some companions, at the foot of Mount Pisa.")
- Saint Marciana, a virgin-martyr venerated in Toledo in Spain (c. 303) (Note: "At Toledo, St. Marciana, virgin and martyr. For 'the faith of Christ, she was exposed to the beasts, torn to pieces by a bull, and was thus crowned with martyrdom.")
- Saints Nabor and Felix, martyrs in Milan in Italy under Diocletian (c. 304) (Note: "At Milan, the holy martyrs Nabor and Felix, who suffered in the persecution of Maximian." Their relics were enshrined by St Ambrose nearly a century after their martyrdom.)
- Saint Paternian, Bishop of Bologna in Italy (c. 470)
- Saint Viventiolus, a monk at St Oyend in France who became Archbishop of Lyons (524) (Note: He was close to St Avitus of Vienne.)
- Saint Proculus, Bishop of Bologna in Italy (540-542), martyred by the Goths (542)
- Saint Menulphus (Menou), born in Ireland, he became Bishop of Quimper in Brittany (7th century) (Note: See: (in French) Saint Menulphe. Wikipédia. (French Wikipedia).)
- Saint Ansbald of Prüm, in Germany (886) (Note: Born in Luxembourg, he became a monk at Prüm in Germany, then Abbot of Saint-Hubert in the Ardennes, and finally of Prüm in 860. His monastery was burnt down by the Vikings in 882 but he succeeded in restoring it.)

== Post-Schism Orthodox saints ==
- Blessed Serapion of Vladimir, Bishop of Vladimir (1275)
- Saint Arsenius of Novgorod, Fool-for-Christ (1570)
- Monk-martyr Simon (Symeon), founder of Volomsk Monastery, Vologda (1641) (Note: See: (in Russian) Симон Воломский. Википедии. (Russian Wikipedia).)
- Venerable Paisios the Athonite (1994) (New Style only, Old Style date June 29, see: June 29 )

== Other commemorations ==
- Icon of the Most Holy Theotokos "Of the Three Hands" of Hilandar, Mt. Athos. (see also: December 4 and June 28 )
- Icon of the Most Holy Theotokos of Prodromos Skete, Mt. Athos, of Voronezh and of Jackson, California (7th century)
- Translation of the relics (1620) of St. Anthony of Leokhnov, founder of Leokhnovo Monastery, Novgorod (1611)
- Translation of the relics (2004) of New Hieromartyr Momcilo Grgurevic of Serbia (1940s) (Note: See: (in Serbian) Момчило Гргуревић. Википедију. (Serbian Wikipedia).)
- Repose of Hieromonk Daniel (Fomin) of Optina and Sorochinsk (1953)

== Icon gallery ==
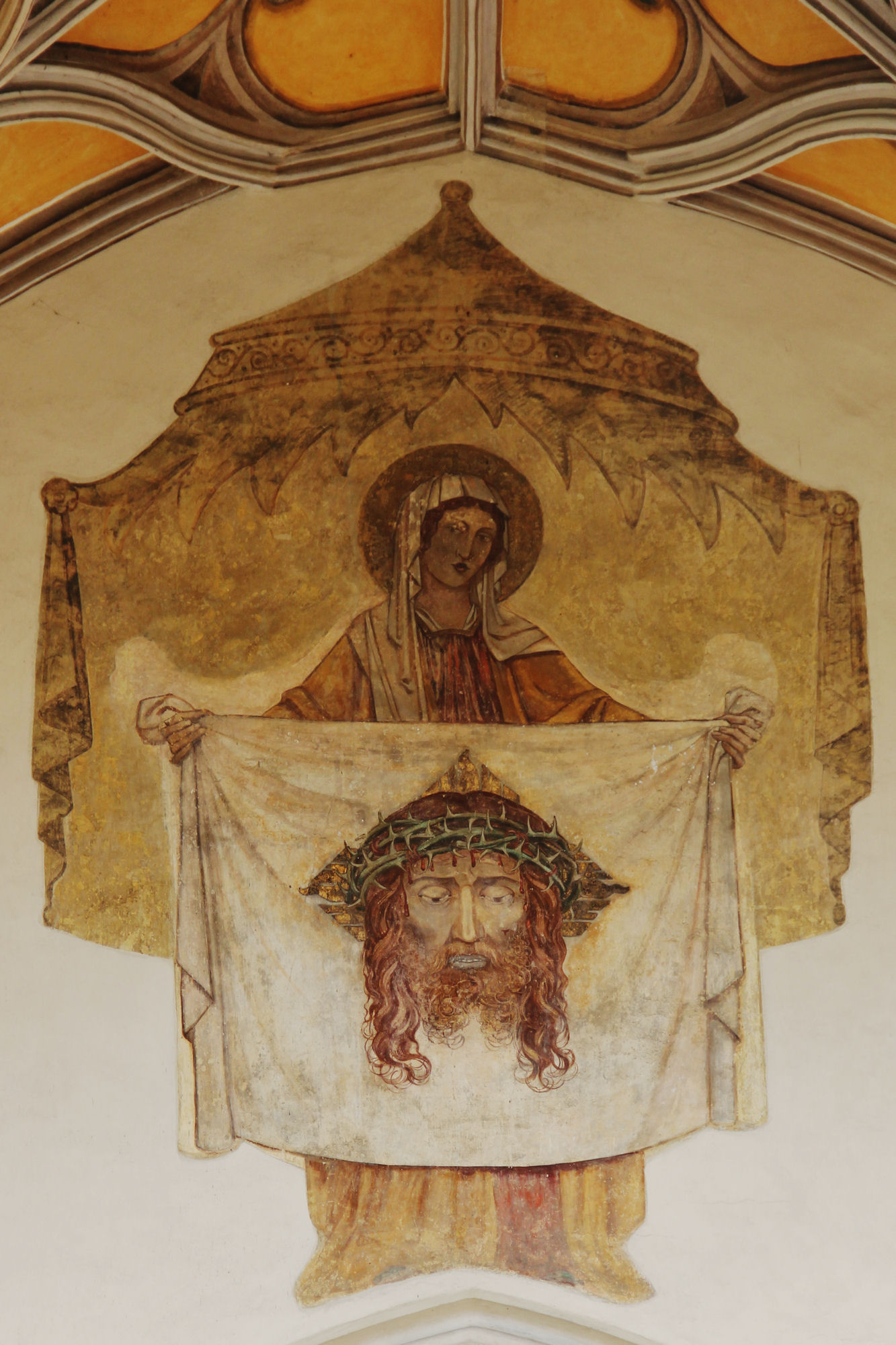
St. Veronica with the Acheiropoieta.

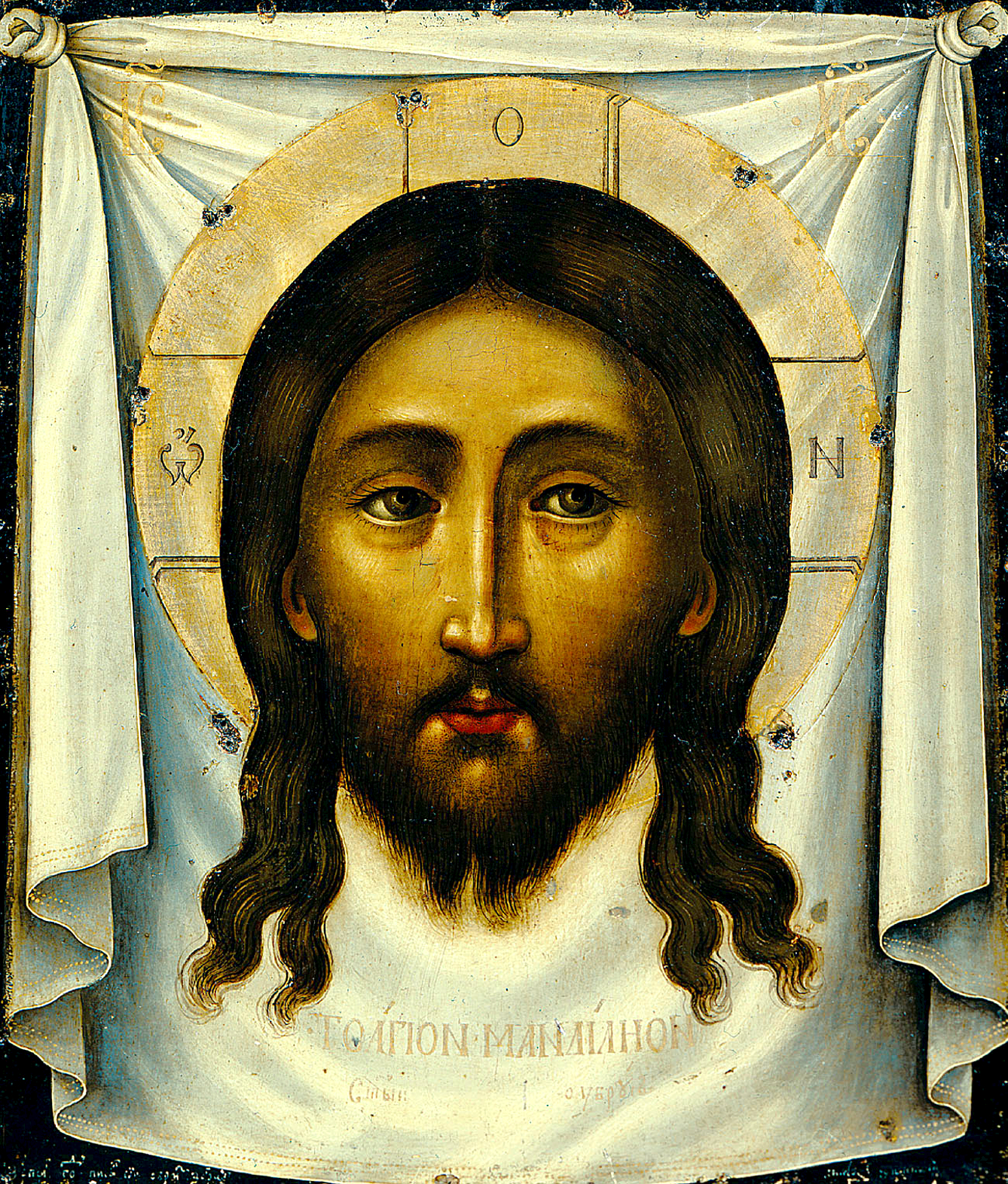
Image of the Saviour Made Without Hands (Simon Ushakov, 1658).

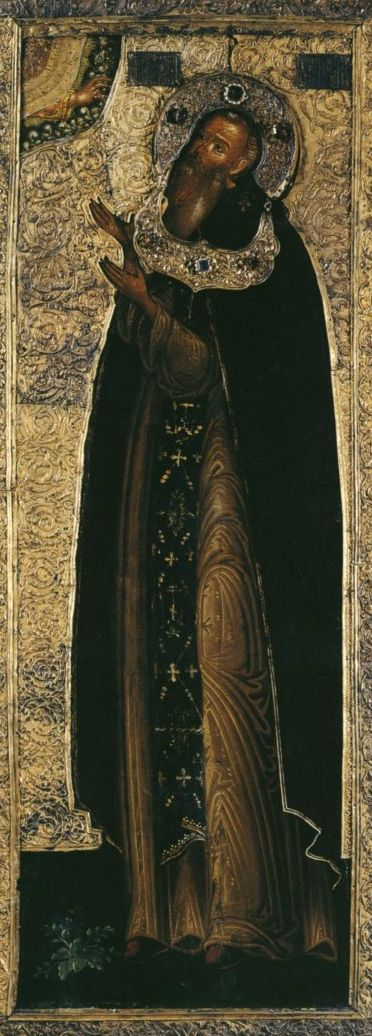
St. Michael Maleinus.

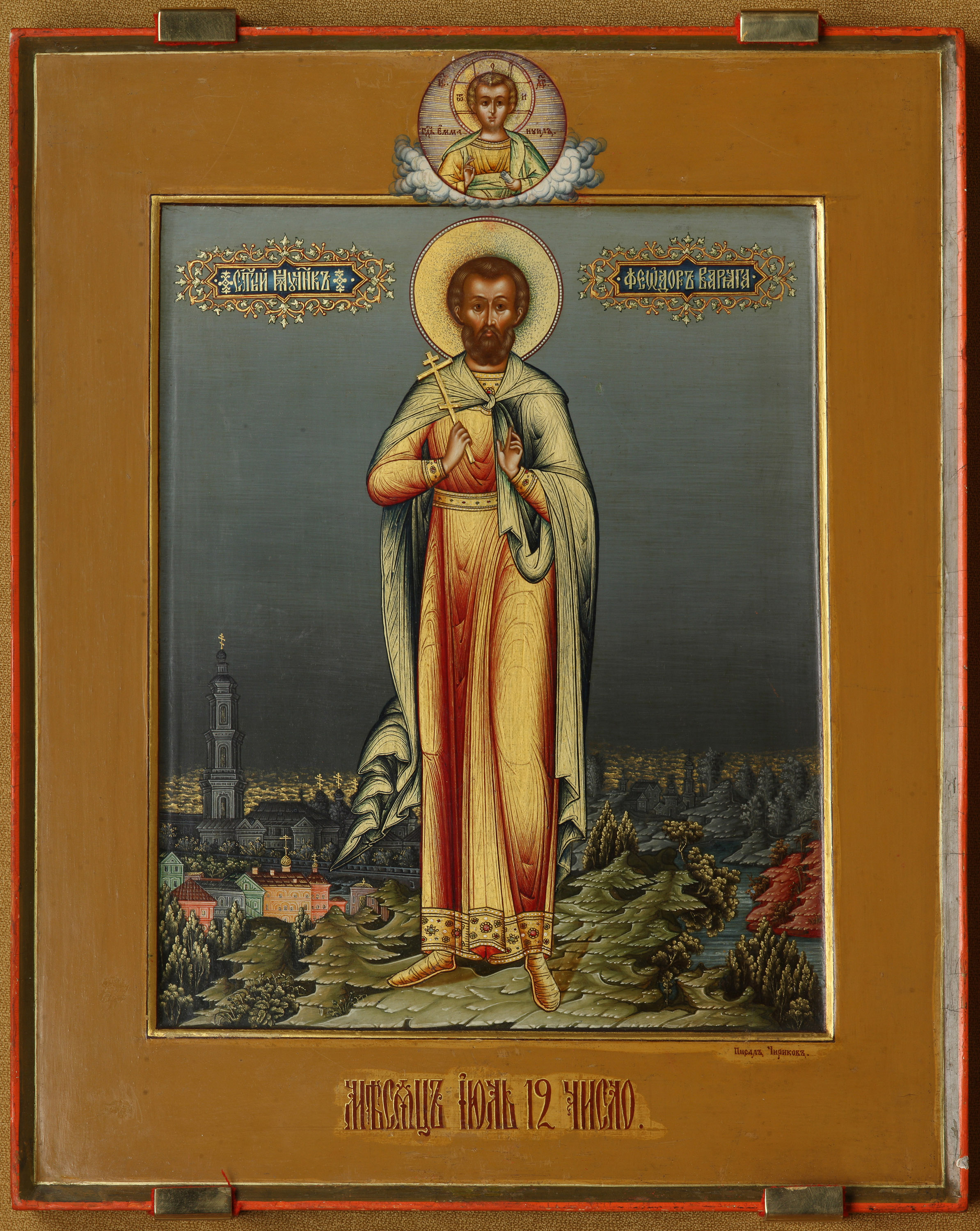
Martyr Theodore of Kiev.

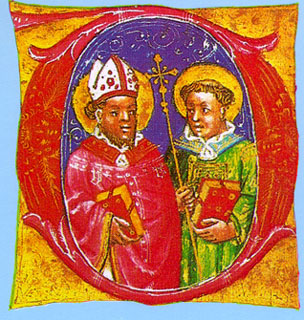
Saints Hermagoras and Fortunatus.

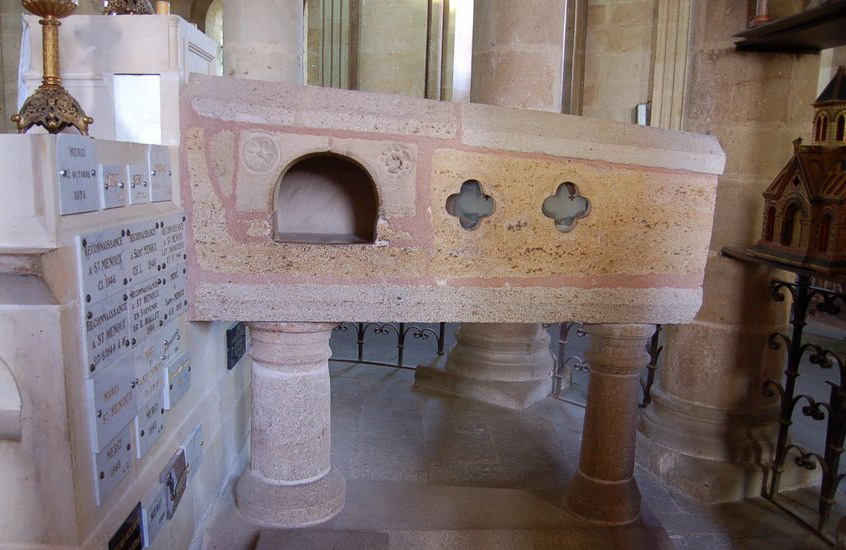
Débredinoire (sarcophagus) of Saint Menoux.

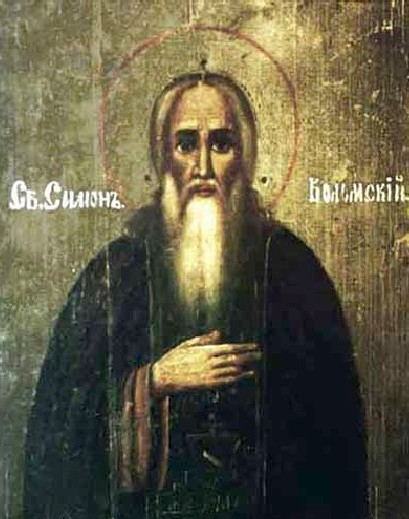
Monk-martyr Simon (Symeon) of Volomsk.

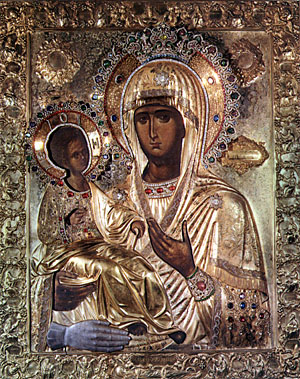
Icon of Panagia Tricherousa ("Three-handed Theotokos").

== Sources ==
- July 12/July 25. Orthodox Calendar (PRAVOSLAVIE.RU).
- July 25 / July 12. HOLY TRINITY RUSSIAN ORTHODOX CHURCH (A parish of the Patriarchate of Moscow).
- July 12. OCA - The Lives of the Saints.
- July 12. The Year of Our Salvation - Holy Transfiguration Monastery, Brookline, Massachusetts.
- The Autonomous Orthodox Metropolia of Western Europe and the Americas (ROCOR). St. Hilarion Calendar of Saints for the year of our Lord 2004. St. Hilarion Press (Austin, TX). p. 51.
- The Twelfth Day of the Month of July. Orthodoxy in China.
- July 12. Latin Saints of the Orthodox Patriarchate of Rome.
- The Roman Martyrology. Transl. by the Archbishop of Baltimore. Last Edition, According to the Copy Printed at Rome in 1914. Revised Edition, with the Imprimatur of His Eminence Cardinal Gibbons. Baltimore: John Murphy Company, 1916. pp. 204–205.
- Rev. Richard Stanton. A Menology of England and Wales, or, Brief Memorials of the Ancient British and English Saints Arranged According to the Calendar, Together with the Martyrs of the 16th and 17th Centuries. London: Burns & Oates, 1892. p. 331.

Greek Sources

- Great Synaxaristes: (in Greek) 12 ΙΟΥΛΙΟΥ. ΜΕΓΑΣ ΣΥΝΑΞΑΡΙΣΤΗΣ.
- (in Greek) Συναξαριστής. 12 Ιουλίου. ECCLESIA.GR. (H ΕΚΚΛΗΣΙΑ ΤΗΣ ΕΛΛΑΔΟΣ).
- (in Greek) 12/07/2018. Ορθόδοξος Συναξαριστής.

Russian Sources

- (in Russian) 25 июля (12 июля). Православная Энциклопедия под редакцией Патриарха Московского и всея Руси Кирилла (электронная версия). (Orthodox Encyclopedia - Pravenc.ru).
- (in Russian) 12 июля по старому стилю / 25 июля по новому стилю. СПЖ "Союз православных журналистов". 2018.
- (in Russian) 12 июля (ст.ст.) 25 июля 2014 (нов. ст.). Русская Православная Церковь Отдел внешних церковных связей. (DECR).
