= June 28 (Eastern Orthodox liturgics) =

Day in the Eastern Orthodox liturgical calendar

Eastern Orthodox liturgical calendar
June 27	June 28	June 29
June 28 O.S. ≍ July 11 N.S. June 28 N.S ≍ June 15 O.S.

An Eastern Orthodox cross

June 28 in Eastern Orthodox liturgical calendars is a feast day and a day of commemoration of saints and martyrs. Although some Orthodox churches use the Revised Julian Calendar and others use the traditional Julian calendar, the fixed commemorations for their respective June 28 are broadly the same, no matter which calendar is used. (Note: Despite the dates being the same, the days to which they refer typically differ by 13 days. The notation Old Style or O.S. is sometimes used to indicate a date in the traditional Julian Calendar (the "Old Calendar"). The notation New Style or N.S. indicates a date in the Revised Julian calendar (the "New Calendar").)

== Saints ==
- Martyrs Plutarch, Serenus, Heraclides, Heron, Rhaïs, Potamiœna and her mother Marcella, at Alexandria, under Septimius Severus (203) (Note: "At Alexandria, in the same persecution of Severus, the holy martyrs Plutarch, Serenus, Heraclides, catechumen, Heron, neophyte, another Serenus, Rhais, catechumen, Potamiœena and Marcella, her mother. Among them, the virgin Potamiœna is particularly distinguished. She first endured many most painful trials for the preservation of her virginity, and then cruel and unheard-of torments for the faith, after which she and her mother were consumed with fire.")
- Hieromartyr Donagus, Bishop of Libya, by fire.
- Martyr Macedonius.
- The holy Two Children, who were crucified.
- The holy Three Martyrs of Galatia, by the sword.
- The holy 70 Martyrs of Scythopolis, by the sword.
- Venerable Magnus, who reposed while praying to the Lord.
- Venerable Moses the Anchorite.
- Saint Vulkian, monk.
- Saint Sennuphius the Standard-bearer, of Egypt (late 4th century) (see also: March 25 )
- Saint Paul the Physician, of Corinth (7th century)
- Saint Sergius the Magistrate, of Paphlagonia, founder of the Nikitiatus Monastery in Nicomedia (866)

== Pre-Schism Western saints ==
- Saint Irenaeus of Lyon, a Greek cleric noted for expanding Christian communities in France, combatting heresy and defining Orthodoxy (202) (Note: Born in Asia Minor, he was a disciple of St Polycarp, who was a disciple of the Apostle John the Divine. He went to France and became Bishop of Lyon (c 177), where he was later martyred. His writings against Gnosticism are a witness to Apostolic Tradition.) (Note: "At Lyon, in France, St. Irenaeus, bishop and martyr, who, as is related by St. Jerome, was the disciple of blessed Polycarp, bishop of Smyrna, and lived near the time of the Apostles. After having strenuously opposed the heretics by speech and writing, he was crowned with a glorious martyrdom, with almost all the people of his city, during the persecution of Severus.") (see also August 23 )
- Martyr Pappias (Papius), possibly in Sicily, under Diocletian, by beheading (c. 303) (Note: "The same day, during the persecution of Diocletian, St. Papius, martyr, who was scourged with knotted cords, cast into a caldron of seething oil and grease, and after other horrible torments, was decapitated, and thus won an eternal crown.")
- Saint Crummin of Lecua (Crummine), a disciple of St Patrick at Leccuine (Lackan) in Westmeath in Ireland (5th century)
- Saint Austell of Cornwall (Austol) (6th century) (Note: A disciple of St Mewan or Mevan of Cornwall. He probably lived in the area where the place-name preserves his memory.)
- Saint Benignus, Bishop of Utrecht in Holland (6th century) (Note: His relics were uncovered there in 996.) (Note: "At Maastricht, St. Benignus, bishop and martyr.")
- Saint Theodichildis (Theodehilda, Telchildis), a nun at Faremoutiers Abbey in France, she became the first Abbess of Jouarre (c. 660) (Note: "Little or nothing is known of this saint, except that she was a daughter of Clovis, king of the Franks; and that she obtained from him a grant of lands at Sens, where she founded the convent of S. Pierre-le-Vif, into which she retired, and where she died.") (Note: See also: Théodechilde (fille de Thierry Ier). Wikipédia. (French Wikipedia).)
- Saint Argymirus of Córdoba, martyr (856) (Note: Born in Cabra near Cordoba in Spain, he held a high position among the Muslims of the city. He was deprived of his office on account of his faith and became a monk. Shortly afterwards he openly renounced Islam, confessed Christ and was beheaded.) (Note: "At Cordova, St. Argymirus, monk and martyr, who was slain for the faith of Christ during the persecution of the Arabs.")
- Saint Egilo (Egilon, Eigil), a monk and later Abbot of Prüm near Trier in Germany (871) (Note: He restored the monastery at Flavigny near Dijon and founded the monastery of Corbigny, both in France.)
- Saint Heimerad (Heimrad), a priest at Baden in Germany who after many pilgrimages lived as a monk at Hersfeld Abbey and then as a hermit at Hasungen in Westphalia (1019)

== Post-Schism Orthodox saints ==
- Venerable Xenophon of Robeika, founder of Robeika Monastery, Novgorod (1262)
- Saints Sergius and Herman, founders and abbots of Valaam Monastery, Wonderworkers (c. 1353)
- Saint Heliodorus, Schema-Archimandrite of Glinsk Hermitage (1879)

=== New martyrs and confessors ===
- New Hieromartyr Basil Sitnikov, Deacon (1918)
- Virgin-martyr Sebastiana Ageyev-Zueva (1938)
- New Hieromartyr Gregory Samarin, Deacon (1940)

== Other commemorations ==
- Translation of the relics (412) of the Holy Wonderworking Unmercenaries and Martyrs Cyrus and John (311)
- Synaxis of the Icon of the Most Holy Theotokos "Of the Three Hands" of Hilandar ("Trojeručica, Tricherousa"), Mount Athos (8th century) (Note: The Damascene Icon of the Mother of God, by ancient tradition, was painted by St John of Damascus in gratitude to the Theotokos for the miraculous healing of his right hand, cut off through the perfidy of Emperor Leo the Isaurian. This icon is also known as "Of the Three Hands" Icon of the Mother of God (June 28, and July 12).) (see also: December 4 )
- Repose of Archimandrite Sophrony (Sakharov) of Essex (1993) (see also: July 11)
- Repose of Archimandrite Methodius (Popovich) of Jerusalem (1997)

== Icon gallery ==
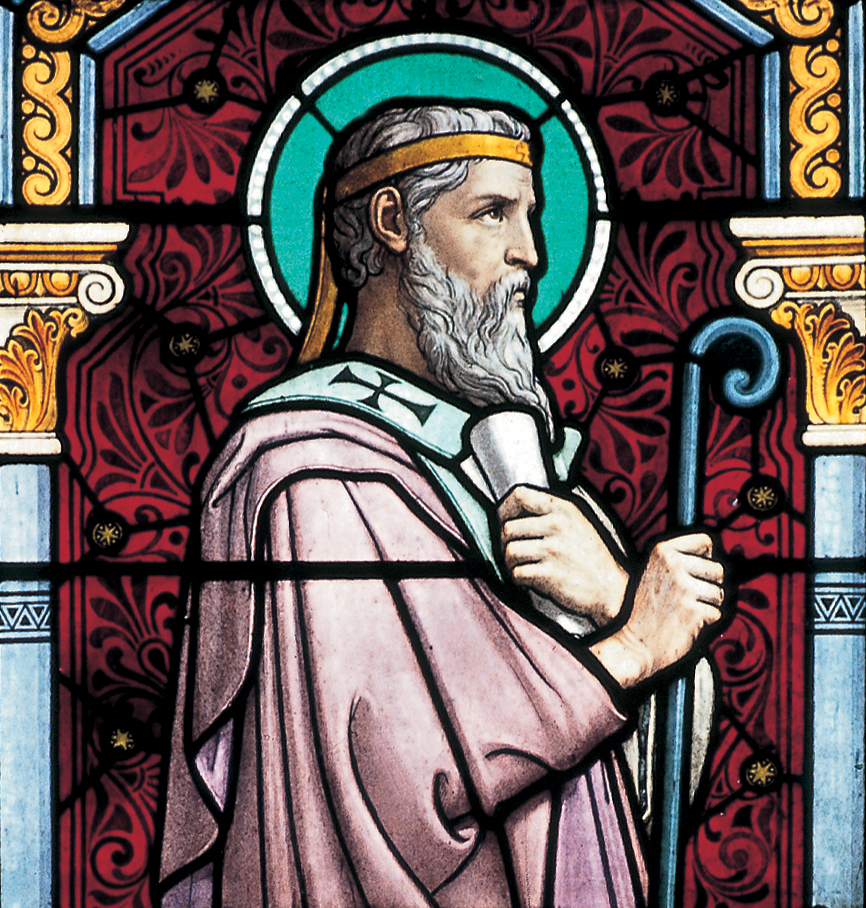
St. Irenaeus, Bishop of Lyon

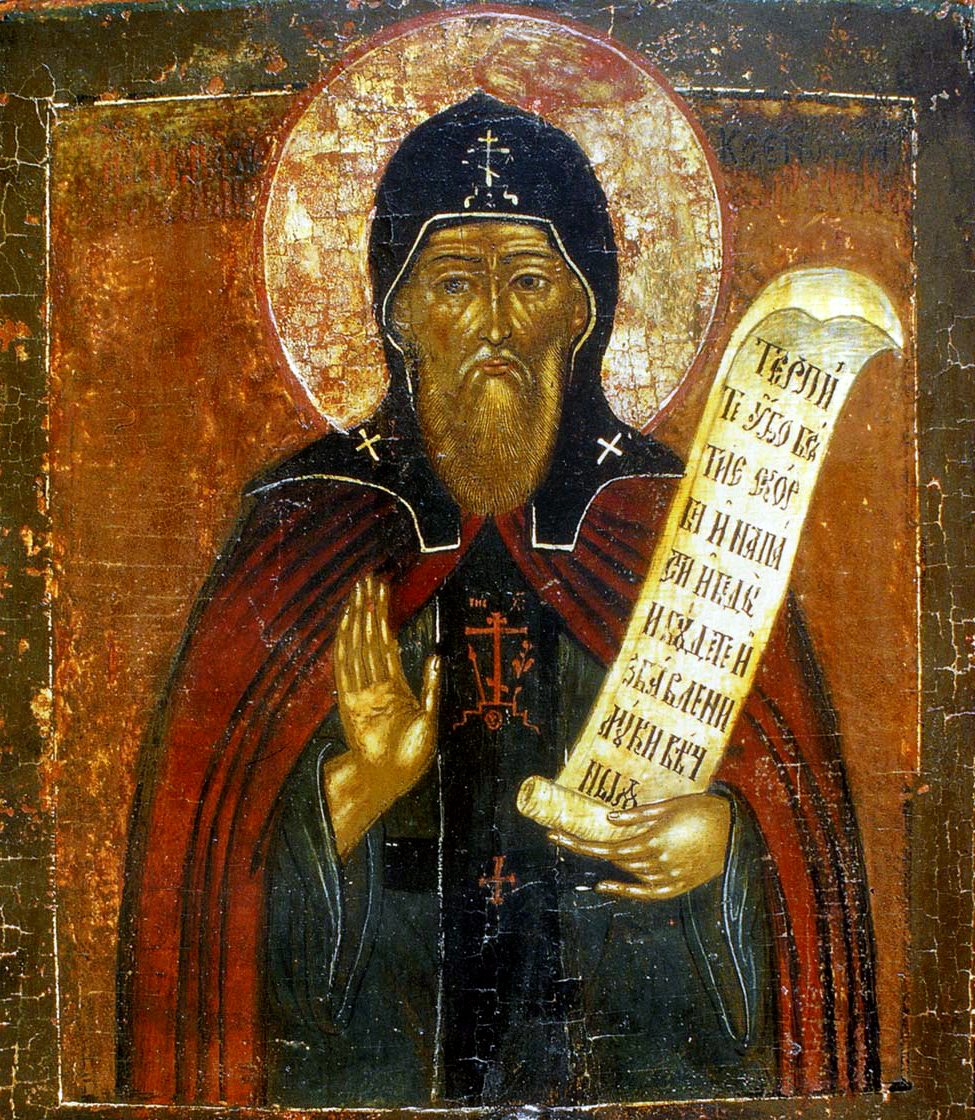
St. Xenophon of Robeika

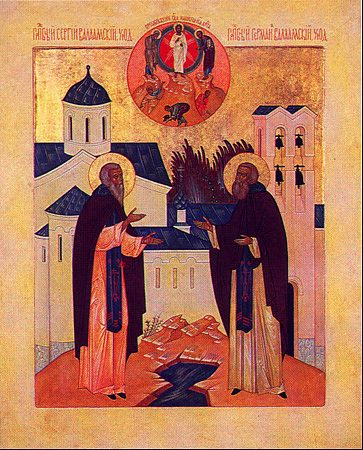
Saints Sergius and Herman of Valaam

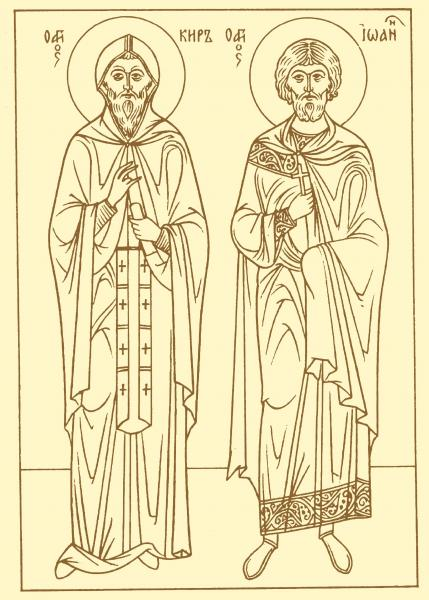
Unmercenaries and Martyrs Cyrus and John

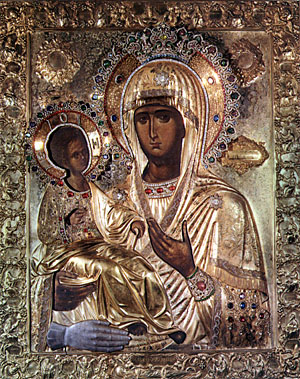
Icon of Panagia Tricherousa ("Three-handed Theotokos")

== Sources ==
- June 28/July 11. Orthodox Calendar (PRAVOSLAVIE.RU).
- July 11 / June 28. HOLY TRINITY RUSSIAN ORTHODOX CHURCH (A parish of the Patriarchate of Moscow).
- June 28. OCA - The Lives of the Saints.
- June 28. The Year of Our Salvation - Holy Transfiguration Monastery, Brookline, Massachusetts.
- The Autonomous Orthodox Metropolia of Western Europe and the Americas (ROCOR). St. Hilarion Calendar of Saints for the year of our Lord 2004. St. Hilarion Press (Austin, TX). pp. 47–48.
- The Twenty-Eighth Day of the Month of June. Orthodoxy in China.
- June 28. Latin Saints of the Orthodox Patriarchate of Rome.
- The Roman Martyrology. Transl. by the Archbishop of Baltimore. Last Edition, According to the Copy Printed at Rome in 1914. Revised Edition, with the Imprimatur of His Eminence Cardinal Gibbons. Baltimore: John Murphy Company, 1916. pp. 187–188.
- Rev. Richard Stanton. A Menology of England and Wales, or, Brief Memorials of the Ancient British and English Saints Arranged According to the Calendar, Together with the Martyrs of the 16th and 17th Centuries. London: Burns & Oates, 1892. pp. 292–293.

Greek Sources

- Great Synaxaristes: (in Greek) 28 ΙΟΥΝΙΟΥ. ΜΕΓΑΣ ΣΥΝΑΞΑΡΙΣΤΗΣ.
- (in Greek) Συναξαριστής. 28 Ιουνίου. ECCLESIA.GR. (H ΕΚΚΛΗΣΙΑ ΤΗΣ ΕΛΛΑΔΟΣ).
- (in Greek) 28 Ιουνίου. Αποστολική Διακονία της Εκκλησίας της Ελλάδος (Apostoliki Diakonia of the Church of Greece).
- (in Greek) 28/06/2018. Ορθόδοξος Συναξαριστής.

Russian Sources

- (in Russian) 11 июля (28 июня). Православная Энциклопедия под редакцией Патриарха Московского и всея Руси Кирилла (электронная версия). (Orthodox Encyclopedia - Pravenc.ru).
- (in Russian) 28 июня по старому стилю / 11 июля по новому стилю. Русская Православная Церковь - Православный церковный календарь на 2017 год.
- (in Russian) 28 июня (ст.ст.) 11 июля 2014 (нов. ст.). Русская Православная Церковь Отдел внешних церковных связей. (DECR).
