= July 25 (Eastern Orthodox liturgics) =

Day in the Eastern Orthodox liturgical calendar

Eastern Orthodox liturgical calendar
July 24	July 25	July 26
July 25 O.S. ≍ August 7 N.S. July 25 N.S ≍ July 12 O.S.

An Eastern Orthodox cross

July 25 in Eastern Orthodox liturgical calendars is a feast day and a day of commemoration of saints and martyrs. Although some Orthodox churches use the Revised Julian Calendar and others use the traditional Julian calendar, the fixed commemorations for their respective July 25 are broadly the same, no matter which calendar is used. (Note: Despite the dates being the same, the days to which they refer typically differ by 13 days. The notation Old Style or O.S. is sometimes used to indicate a date in the traditional Julian Calendar (the "Old Calendar"). The notation New Style or N.S. indicates a date in the Revised Julian calendar (the "New Calendar").)

== Saints ==
- The Dormition of the Righteous Anna, Mother of the Most Holy Theotokos.
- The Holy Martyrs of Lyon: (c. 177) (Note: There were 48 victims at Lugdunum, half of them were of Greek origin, half Gallo-Roman. The elderly Bishop Pothinus, first Bishop of Lugdunum, was beaten and scourged, and died shortly after in prison.) (see also: June 2)

- Pothinus, Bishop of Lyon, Sanctus the Deacon, Maturus, Attalus, Blandina, Vettius, Epagathus, Biblis, Ponticus, Alexander, and those with them, at Lyon.

- Righteous Olympias the Deaconess, of Constantinople (410)
- Virgin-martyr Eupraxia of Tabennisi (413) (Note: Name days celebrated today include: Eupraxia (Εὐπραξία).) (see also: March 13)
- Saint Elias of Thessaloniki, Metropolitan of Thessaloniki, who played a leading role in the Fifth Ecumenical Council (c. 553)

== Pre-Schism Western saints ==
- Saint James the Greater, the son of Zebedee and brother of St John the Evangelist (44) (Note: The son of Zebedee and brother of St John the Evangelist, he was one of the Twelve and the first to be martyred (Acts 12,2) under King Herod Agrippa. By tradition he travelled as far as Spain and certainly relics of the Apostle were later enshrined in Compostella. Owing to this apostolic link, it became the most important places of pilgrimage in the West after Rome. St James is the patron-saint of Spain.) (Note: "ST. JAMES the Apostle, brother of the blessed evangelist John, who was beheaded by Herod Agrippa about the feast of Easter. His sacred bones were on this day carried from Jerusalem to Spain, and placed in the remote province of Galicia, where they are devoutly honored by the far-famed piety of the inhabitants, and the frequent concourse of Christians, who visit them through piety and in fulfilment of their vows.") (see also: April 30 - East)
- Saints Florentius and Felix, two soldiers martyred under Maximinius the Thracian at Furcona near Aquila in the south of Italy (235) (Note: They belong to a group of eighty-three soldiers commemorated on July 24.) (Note: "At Forcono, in Abruzzo, the holy martyrs Florentius and Felix, natives of Sipontum.")
- Martyr Cucuphas of Barcelona (Cucufate, Cugat, Guinefort, Qoqofas), a martyr of Spain (304) (Note: Born in North Africa, he went to Spain and was martyred near Barcelona where the monastery of St Cugat del Valles was later founded. He is one of the most famous Spanish martyrs.) (Note: "At Barcelona, in Spain, during the persecution of Diocletian and under the governor Dacian, the birthday of the holy martyr Cucuphas. After overcoming many torments, he was struck with the sword, and thus went triumphantly to heaven.")
- Saint Nessan (Neasán), a convert of St Patrick of Ireland, he became Abbot of Montgarth (Mountgarret, Mungret) in Wexford (5th century)
- Saint Magnericus of Trier, Bishop of Trier in Germany (596) (Note: He was a close friend of St Gregory of Tours and one of the most illustrious bishops of his time.) (Note: "At Treves, St. Magnericus, bishop and confessor.")
- Saint Ebrulfus (Evroult), born in Beauvais in France, he became a hermit and later founded a monastery at Saint-Fuscien-aux-Bois (fr) (c. 600)
- Saint Glodesinda of Metz, a nun in Metz in France, where she later became abbess (c. 608) (Note: She was betrothed to a courtier who was arrested on their wedding day and afterwards executed. She became a nun in Metz in France, where she later became abbess.)
- Saint Banthus of Trier, Bishop of Trier in Germany (7th century) (see also: July 28)
- Saint Theodemir of Córdoba, a monk martyred in Córdoba in Spain under Abderrahman II (851) (Note: "At Cordova, St. Theodemirus, monk and martyr.")

== Post-Schism Orthodox saints ==
- Venerable Macarius of Zheltovod and Unzha, Abbot and Wonderworker (1444)
- Venerable Christopher of Solvychegodsk in Vologda, Abbot (1572)
- Saint Gregory (Kallidis), Metropolitan of Thessalonica and of Heraclea (1925) (see also: June 29)

=== New martyrs and confessors ===
- New Hieromartyr Nicholas Udintsev, Priest (1918)
- New Hieromartyr Alexander Sakharov, Priest (1927)
- New Hieromartyr Theodore Tonkovid, Priest of Lovets, Pskov (1942)
- New Hieromartyrs Vukosav Milanovic and Rodoljub Samardzic, of Kulen Vakuf, Serbia (1941-1945)
- Saint Iraida Tikhova, Confessor (1967)

== Other commemorations ==
- Commemoration of the Holy 165 Fathers of the Fifth Ecumenical Council, who refuted the doctrines of Origen (553)

== Icon gallery ==
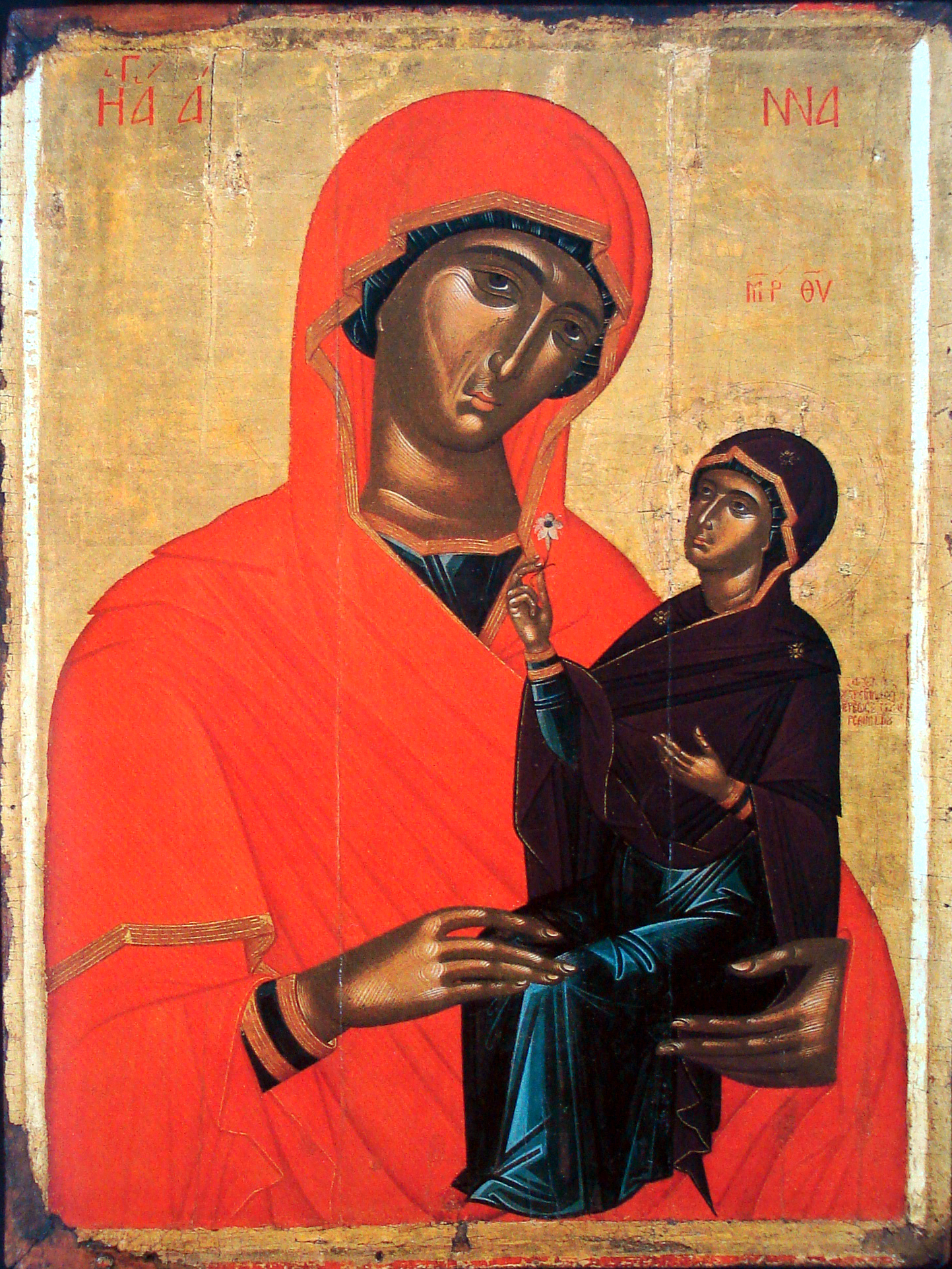
Righteous Anna, Mother of the Most Holy Theotokos

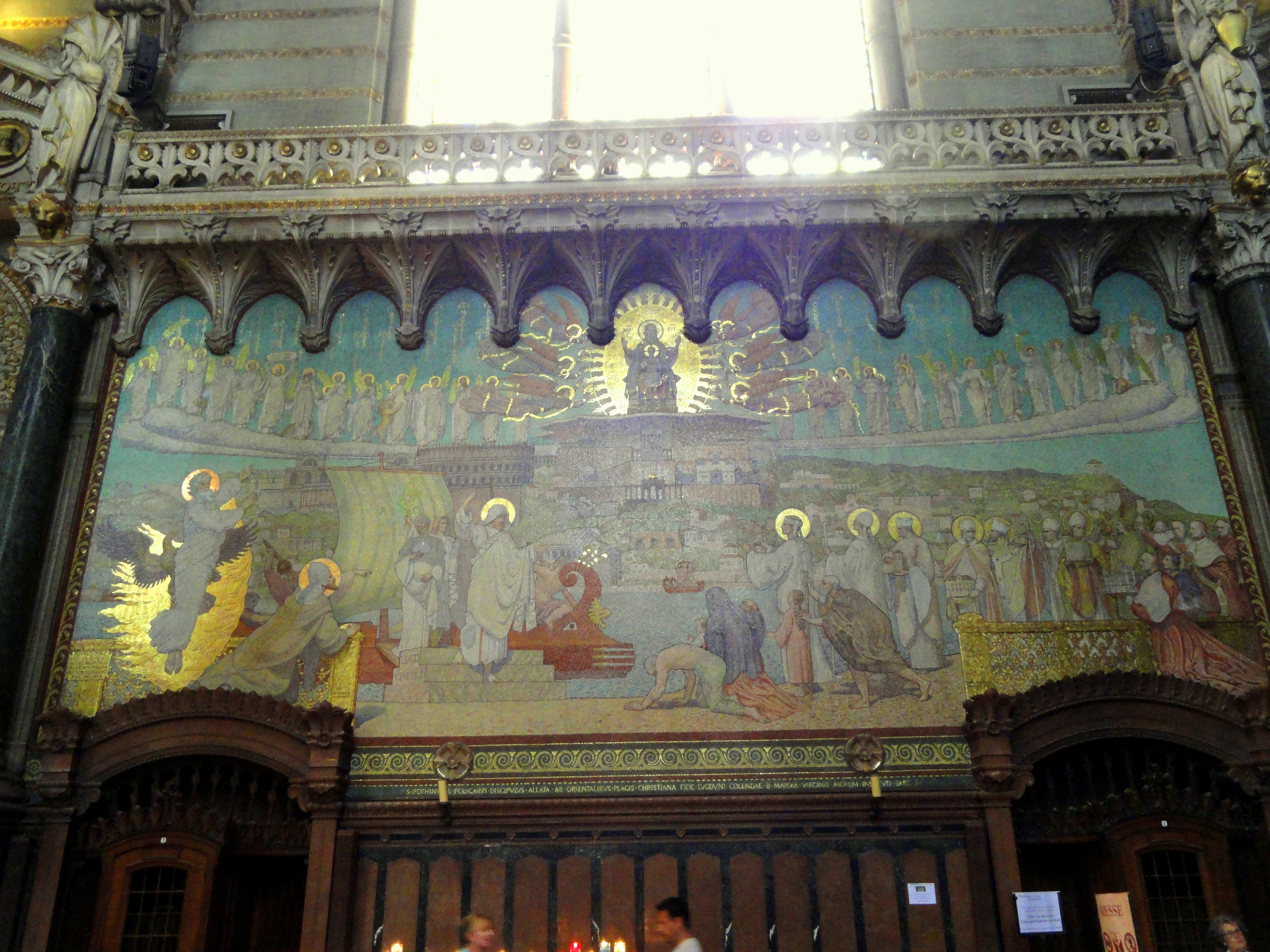
19th century mosaic icon in the Basilica of Fourvière: The Holy Martyrs of Lyon (in top register)

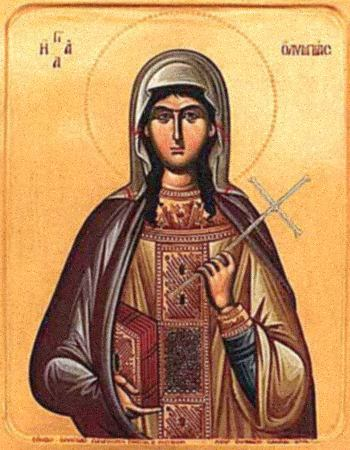
St. Olympias the Deaconess

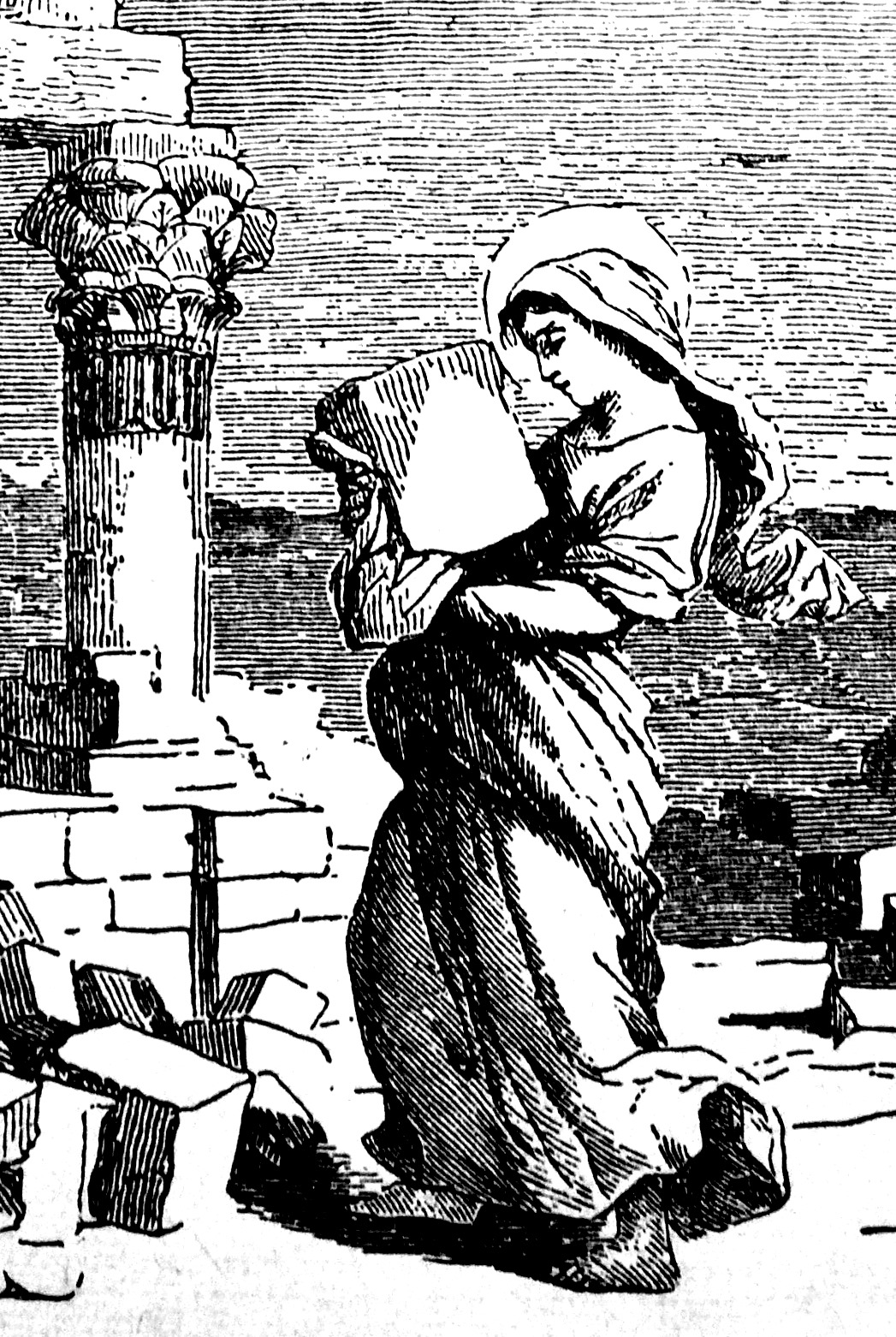
St. Eupraxia carrying heavy rocks as a penitential labor

Reliquary of St. James the Greater (Santiago de Compostela Cathedral).

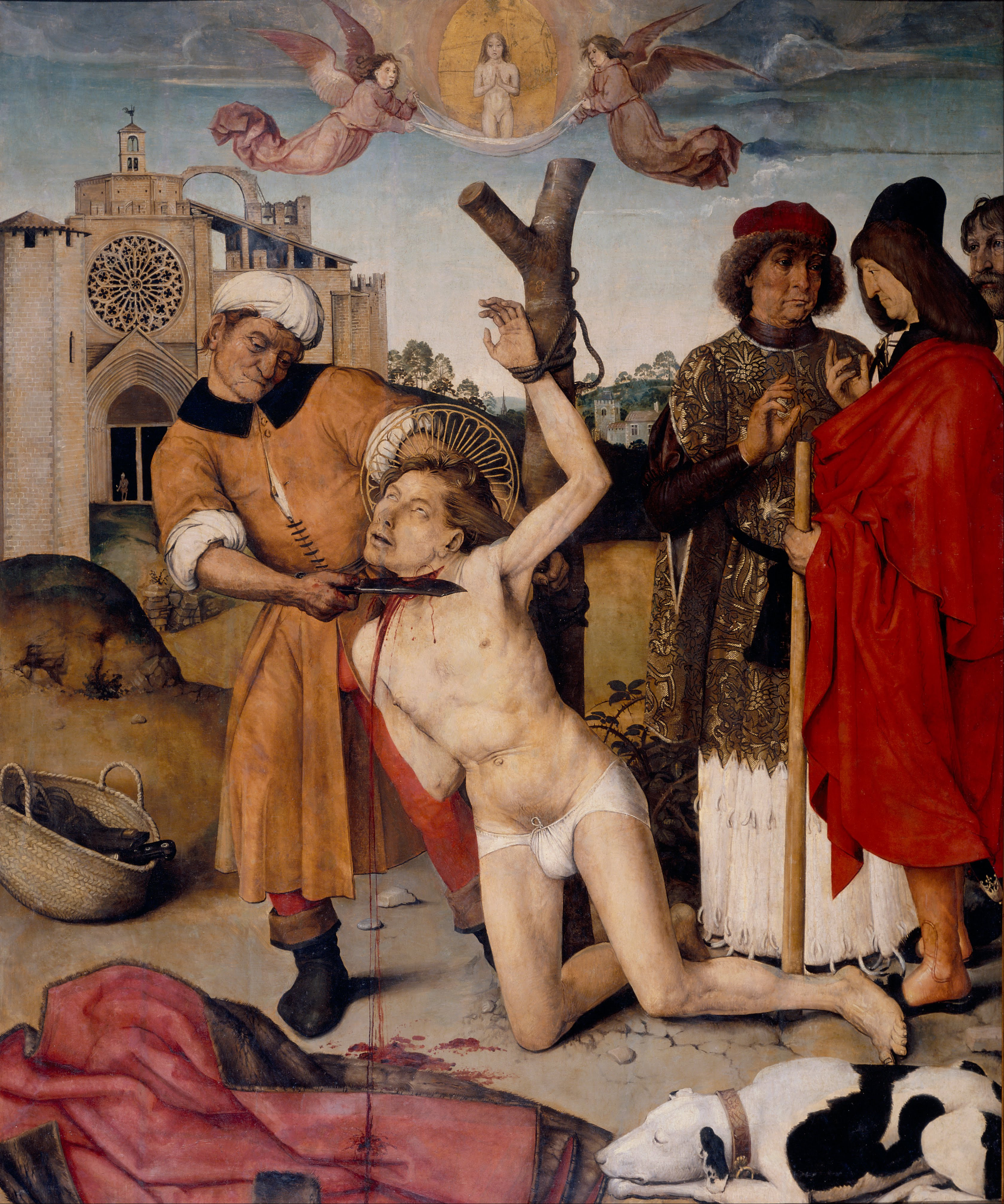
The Martyrdom of St. Cucuphas

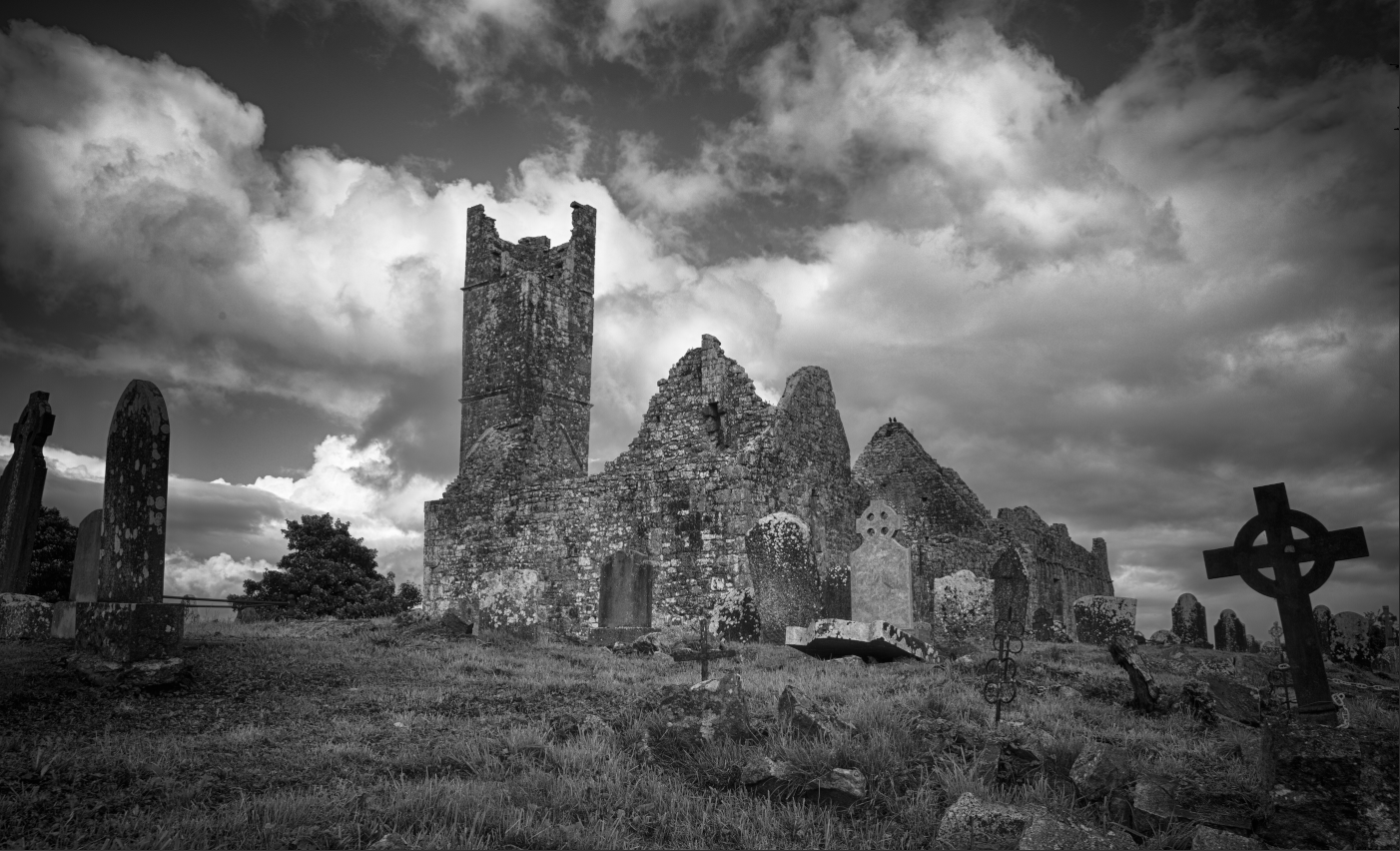
St Nessan's Abbey Church, Mungret, Limerick

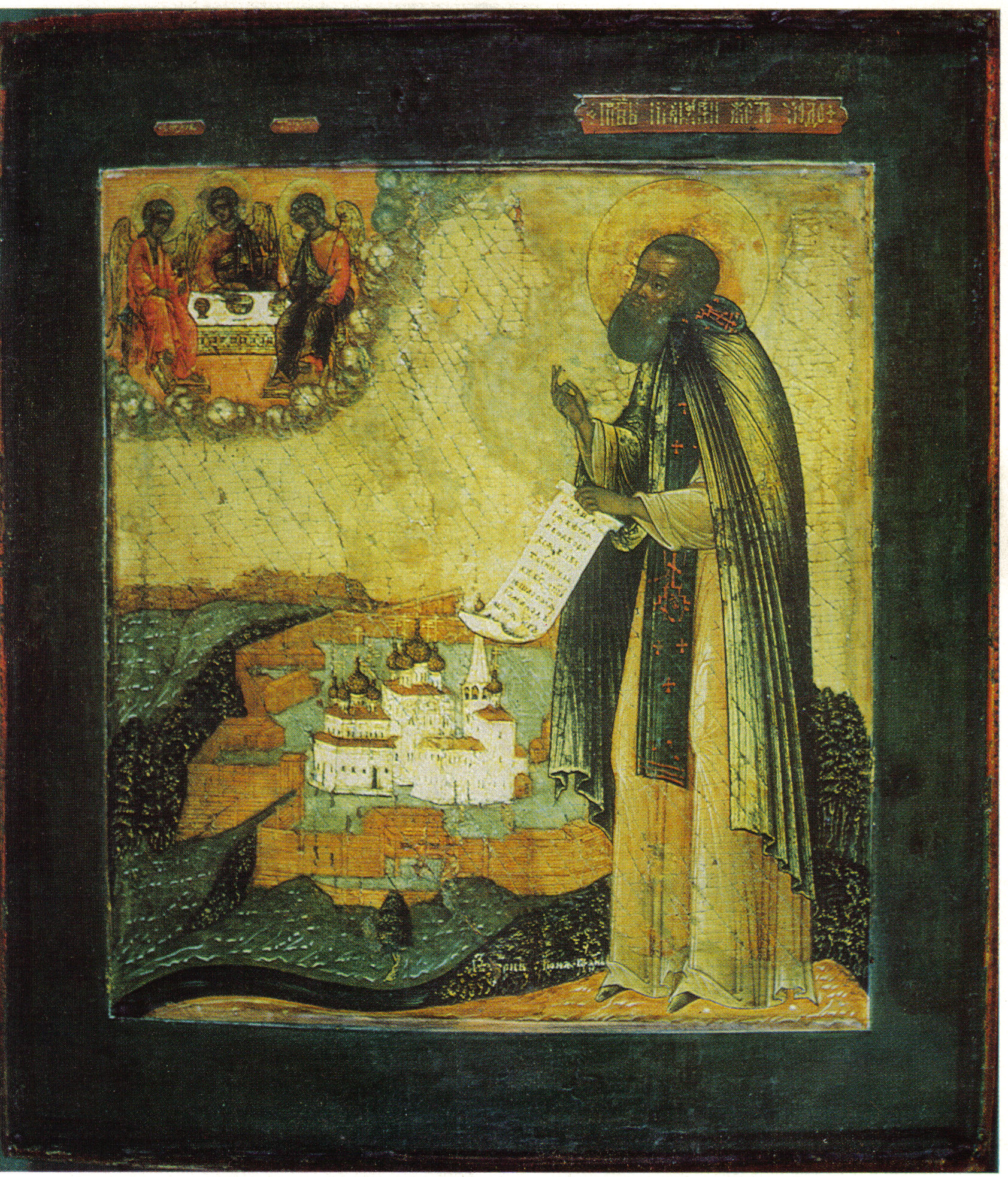
Venerable Macarius of Unzha

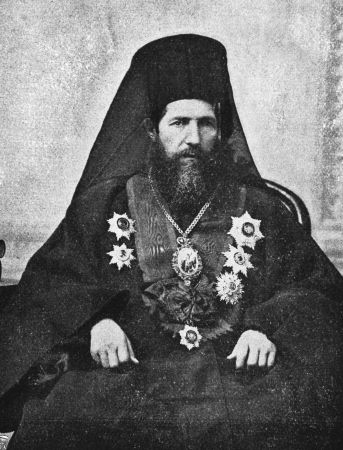
St. Gregory (Kallidis), Metropolitan of Thessaloniki and of Heraclea

== Sources ==
- July 25/August 7. Orthodox Calendar (PRAVOSLAVIE.RU).
- August 7 / July 25. HOLY TRINITY RUSSIAN ORTHODOX CHURCH (A parish of the Patriarchate of Moscow).
- July 25. OCA - The Lives of the Saints.
- July 25. The Year of Our Salvation - Holy Transfiguration Monastery, Brookline, Massachusetts.
- The Autonomous Orthodox Metropolia of Western Europe and the Americas (ROCOR). St. Hilarion Calendar of Saints for the year of our Lord 2004. St. Hilarion Press (Austin, TX). pp. 54–55.
- The Twenty-Fifth Day of the Month of July. Orthodoxy in China.
- July 25. Latin Saints of the Orthodox Patriarchate of Rome.
- The Roman Martyrology. Transl. by the Archbishop of Baltimore. Last Edition, According to the Copy Printed at Rome in 1914. Revised Edition, with the Imprimatur of His Eminence Cardinal Gibbons. Baltimore: John Murphy Company, 1916. pp. 219–220.
- Rev. Richard Stanton. A Menology of England and Wales, or, Brief Memorials of the Ancient British and English Saints Arranged According to the Calendar, Together with the Martyrs of the 16th and 17th Centuries. London: Burns & Oates, 1892. pp. 357–358.

Greek Sources

- Great Synaxaristes: (in Greek) 25 ΙΟΥΛΙΟΥ. ΜΕΓΑΣ ΣΥΝΑΞΑΡΙΣΤΗΣ.
- (in Greek) Συναξαριστής. 25 Ιουλίου. ECCLESIA.GR. (H ΕΚΚΛΗΣΙΑ ΤΗΣ ΕΛΛΑΔΟΣ).
- (in Greek) 25/07/2026. Ορθόδοξος Συναξαριστής.

Russian Sources

- (in Russian) 7 августа (25 июля). Православная Энциклопедия под редакцией Патриарха Московского и всея Руси Кирилла (электронная версия). (Orthodox Encyclopedia - Pravenc.ru).
- (in Russian) 25 июля по старому стилю / 7 августа по новому стилю. СПЖ "Союз православных журналистов". 2026.
- (in Russian) 25 июля (ст.ст.) 7 августа 2026 (нов. ст.). Русская Православная Церковь Отдел внешних церковных связей. (DECR).
