= July 11 (Eastern Orthodox liturgics) =

Day in the Eastern Orthodox liturgical calendar

Eastern Orthodox liturgical calendar
July 10	July 11	July 12
July 11 O.S. ≍ July 24 N.S. July 11 N.S ≍ June 28 O.S.

An Eastern Orthodox cross

July 11 in Eastern Orthodox liturgical calendars is a feast day and a day of commemoration of saints and martyrs. Although some Orthodox churches use the Revised Julian Calendar and others use the traditional Julian calendar, the fixed commemorations for their respective July 11 are broadly the same, no matter which calendar is used. (Note: Despite the dates being the same, the days to which they refer typically differ by 13 days. The notation Old Style or O.S. is sometimes used to indicate a date in the traditional Julian Calendar (the "Old Calendar"). The notation New Style or N.S. indicates a date in the Revised Julian calendar (the "New Calendar").).

== Saints ==
- Hieromartyr Cindeus the Presbyter, of Pamphylia (283-305) (Note: "At Sida, in Pamphylia, St. Cindeus, priest, in the time of the emperor Diocletian and the governor Stratonicus. After suffering many torments, he was thrown into the fire, but remaining uninjured, he yielded up his soul in prayer.")
- Martyr Marcian, by the sword. (Note: "At Iconium, St. Marcian, martyr, who obtained the palm of martyrdom by many torments, under the governor Perennius.") (see also: July 13)
- Martyr Martyrocles, shot with arrows.
- Martyrs Januarius and Pelagia, of Nicopolis in Armenia (c. 310) (Note: "At Nicopolis, in Armenia, the birthday of the holy martyrs Januarius and Pelagia, who for four days were racked, torn with iron claws and pieces of earthenware, and thus achieved their martyrdom.")
- Commemoration of the Miracle (451) of Great-martyr Euphemia the All-praised, of Chalcedon (304) (Note: "The Holy Great Martyr and All-famed Euphemia, Who Confirmed the Definition of Faith of the Fourth Ecumenical Council.") (Note: Her feast day is on September 16. Name days celebrated today include: Euphemia (Εὐφημία).)
- Blessed Equal-to-the-Apostles Olga, Princess of Russia, named Helen in holy baptism (969) (Note: MAGNIFICATION: "We magnify you, Holy Equal-to-the-Apostles, Great-Princess Ol'ha, who like a morning star first shone the light of the Orthodox Faith on our native land." KONDAK, TONE 4: "Today let us chant the praises of God, the Benefactor-of-All, Who has glorified Divinely-Wise Ol'ha in our land, that by her prayers He grant to our souls the forgiveness of sins.") (Note: Name days celebrated today include: Olga (Ὄλγα).)
- Venerable Leo, monk, of Mandra (of the Sheepfold).
- Saint Arsenius of Alexandria, martyred Patriarch of Alexandria (1010) (Note: He is not recorded in the Synaxaristes. His memory is preserved in a manuscript of the Fonds Coislin.)

== Pre-Schism Western saints ==
- Saint Pius I, Pope of Rome from c.142 to c.155 (c. 155) (Note: Pope from c 142 to c 155. He may have been a brother of Hermas, the writer of the work called The Shepherd. If so, Pius, like his brother, was born a slave. He opposed the Gnostics, notably the Gnostic Marcion. He may have been martyred.) (Note: "AT Rome, the blessed Pius, pope and martyr, who was crowned with martyrdom in the persecution of Marcus Aurelius Antoninus.")
- Saint Sidronius, a martyr in Rome under Aurelian (c. 270) (Note: "In the territory of Sens, St. Sidronius, martyr.")
- Saint Sabinus (Savinus) and Cyprian, two martyrs and brothers venerated in Brescia in Italy.
- Saint Sabinus, a saint venerated near Poitiers in France, said to have been a disciple of St Germanus of Auxerre, confessor (5th century)
- Saint Leontius II (the Younger), a soldier who served against the Visigoths, he became Bishop of Bordeaux and participated in the Council of Paris of 553 (c. 565)
- Saint Drostan, founder and first Abbot of Old Deer in Aberdeenshire (c. 610) (Note: Born in Ireland, he became a monk with St Columba and the first Abbot of Deer in Aberdeenshire. He is venerated as one of the Apostles of Scotland. His holy well is near Aberdour.)
- Saint Amabilis (Mable), daughter of an English noble, she became a nun at Saint-Amand in Rouen in France (c. 634)
- Saints Sigisbert and Placid, founders of Disentis Abbey (c. 650 or c. 750) (Note: Sigisbert founded the monastery of Dissentis in Switzerland. He built it on land given to him by St Placid, a wealthy landowner who joined the monastery as a monk and was later martyred for defending it.)
- Saint John of Bergamo, Bishop of Bergamo, renowned for his learning and great success in fighting Arianism (c. 690) (Note: "At Bergamo, St. John, a bishop, who was killed by the Arians for defending the Catholic faith.") (Note: See: (in Italian) San Giovanni vescovo (Bergamo). Wikipedia. (Italian Wikipedia).)
- Saint Hidulf (Hidulphus), founder of Moyenmoutier Abbey, and reputed Bishop of Trier (707) (Note: Born in Regensburg in Germany, he became a monk at the monastery of Maximinus in Trier. Later he was consecrated bishop, but about the year 676 he founded the monastery of Moyenmoutier in the east of France and lived there. When he reposed he was Abbot both of Moyenmoutier and Bonmoutier (Galilaea, afterwards called Saint-Dié).)
- Saint Abundius of Cordoba, Hieromartyr of Córdoba, Spain (854) (Note: A parish priest in Ananelos, a village near Cordoba in Spain. He had no thought of martyrdom, but when he had to, he bravely confessed Christ before the tribunal of the Moorish Caliph of Cordoba. He was beheaded and his body was thrown to the dogs.) (Note: "At Cordova, St. Abundius, a priest, crowned with martyrdom whilst preaching against the sect of Mahomet.")
- Saint Thurketyl (Turketil), the brother of King Edred of England, he became Abbot of Crowland and also of Bedford Abbey (975) (Note: Of Danish origin, he restored the monastery of Crowland in England, which had been destroyed by the pagan Danes. He was also abbot of the monastery at Bedford.)

== Post-Schism Orthodox saints ==
- Venerable Nicodemus of Hilandar and Vatopedi, Mount Athos, instructor of St. Gregory Palamas (1320)
- New Martyr Nicodemus of Elbasan and Mount Athos (1722)
- New Monk-martyr Nectarius of St. Anne's Skete, Mount Athos, at Vryoulla, Ephesus (1820)
- Venerbale Cyril the New, monk, of Paros (1833)

=== New martyrs and confessors ===
- New Hieromartyrs, Priests, of Metropolitanate of Dabar-Bosnia and Mileševa (1941-1946):

- Momcilo Grgurevic, Dobroslav Blazenovic, Milan Bozic, Mihailo Djusic, Jovan Zecevic, Bozidar Jovic, Bogdan Lalic, Trifun Maksimovic, Velimir Mijatovic, Bozidar Minic, Miladin Minic, Marko Popovic, Dimitrije Rajanovic, Budimir Sokolovic, Relja Spahic, Lazar Culibrk, Savo Siljac, Savo Skaljka, Milorad Vukojicic, Ratomir Jankovic, Mihailo Jevdjevic, Dusan Prijovic, Dobrosav Sokovic, Nestor Trkulja, Serafim Dzaric, Andrija Siljak, Slobodan Siljak, and Jovan Rapajic.

- Venerable Archimandrite Sophrony (Sakharov) of Essex (1993) (Note: Here is the official statement from the Ecumenical Patriarchate on November 27, 2019: (in Greek) "Εἰδικώτερον, ἡ Ἁγία καί Ἱερά Σύνοδος, ἀποδεχθεῖσα εἰσήγησιν τῆς Κανονικῆς Ἐπιτροπῆς ἀνέγραψεν εἰς τό Ἁγιολόγιον τῆς Ὀρθοδόξου Ἐκκλησίας τούς ἐγνωσμένης ὁσιακῆς βιοτῆς καί πολιτείας Ἱερομόναχον Ἱερώνυμον Σιμωνοπετρίτην, Καθηγούμενον χρηματίσαντα τῆς ἐν Ἁγίῳ Ὄρει Ἱερᾶς Βασιλικῆς, Πατριαρχικῆς καί Σταυροπηγιακῆς Μονῆς Σίμωνος Πέτρας, καί ἀκολούθως Οἰκονόμον καί Πνευματικόν τοῦ Μετοχίου Ἀναλήψεως Βύρωνος Ἀττικῆς, καί Ἀρχιμανδρίτην Σωφρόνιον Σαχάρωφ, Καθηγούμενον χρηματίσαντα καί κτίτορα τῆς ἐν Ἔσσεξ Ἀγγλίας Ἱερᾶς Πατριαρχικῆς καί Σταυροπηγιακῆς Μονῆς Τιμίου Προδρόμου.") (see also: June 28)

== Other commemorations ==
- Translation of the relics of Venerable Benedict of Nursia, writer of the Rule of Saint Benedict (c. 547) (Note: "Article X.—Translation of St. Benedict's Relics. In the "Leabhar Breac" copy of the "Feilire," by St. Ængus, there is a record of St. Benedict's festival, at the 11th of July. Furthermore, a scholion informs us, that he was Benedict, the Father of Monks. Usuard and other ancient Martyrologists have it as the festival for a Translation of his relics, as the Bollandists note at this day. They refer, however, to his chief feast, at the 21st of March for an exhaustive illustration of his Acts. Also, in Usuard is to be found, at this same date, a Translation of the relics of his sister Scholastica, whose chief festival and Acts are noticed, on the 10th of February.") (Note: Born near Nursia in Umbria in central Italy, at the age of twenty he went to live as a hermit in a cave near Subiaco. Many disciples flocked to him and he built a laura, composed of twelve small monasteries for them. About the year 530 he left Subiaco for Montecassino, where he founded a monastery and where he lived the rest of his life as a deacon and famed as a wonderworker. He reposed while standing in prayer before the altar. Some relics of St Benedict were later translated to France but others remained at Montecassino.) (see also: March 14 )
- Transfer of the Relics of Great-martyr Barbara to Kiev, by Barbara of Byzantium (d. 1125), third wife of Sviatopolk II of Kiev.
- Icon of the Mother of God of Rzhevsk (1539)
- Uncovering of the relics (1677) of Venerable Arkadius of Vyazemsk and Novotorzhsk (1077) (Note: His feast day in on December 13.)
- Uncovering of the relics (1998) of Hieromartyr Hilarion, Archbishop of Verey (1929)
- Repose of cave-dweller Anastasia of St. Cornelius of Padan Hermitage, in Olonets (1901)

== Icon gallery ==
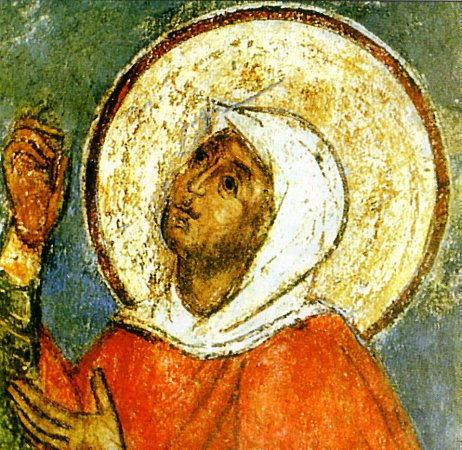
Great-martyr Euphemia the All-praised, of Chalcedon.

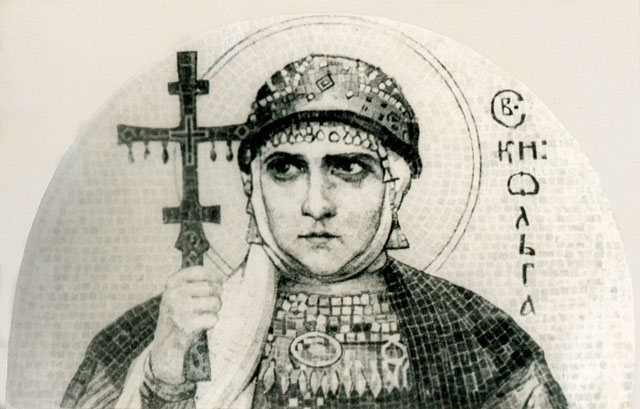
Blessed Equal-to-the-Apostles Olga, Princess of Russia, named Helen in holy baptism.

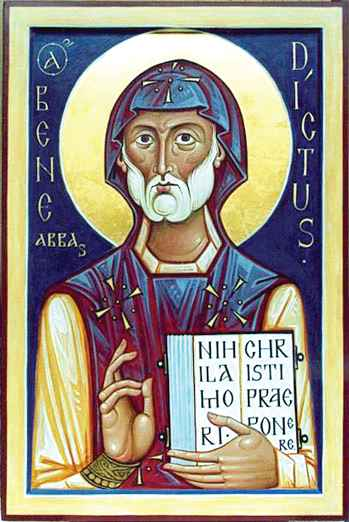
St. Benedict of Nursia.

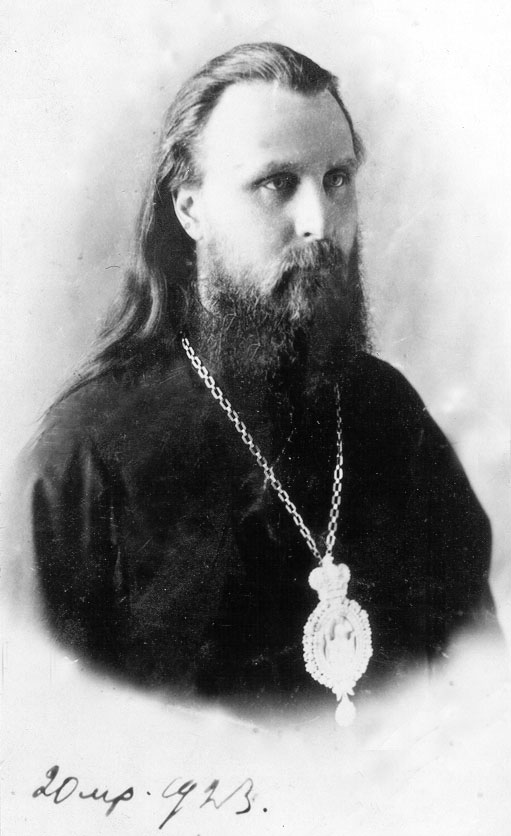
Hieromartyr Hilarion (Troitsky), Archbishop of Verey.

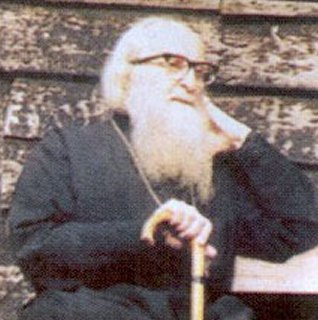
Archimandrite Sophrony (Sakharov) of Essex.

== Sources ==
- July 11/July 24. Orthodox Calendar (PRAVOSLAVIE.RU).
- July 24 / July 11. HOLY TRINITY RUSSIAN ORTHODOX CHURCH (A parish of the Patriarchate of Moscow).
- July 11. OCA - The Lives of the Saints.
- July 11. The Year of Our Salvation - Holy Transfiguration Monastery, Brookline, Massachusetts.
- The Autonomous Orthodox Metropolia of Western Europe and the Americas (ROCOR). St. Hilarion Calendar of Saints for the year of our Lord 2004. St. Hilarion Press (Austin, TX). p. 51.
- The Eleventh Day of the Month of July. Orthodoxy in China.
- July 11. Latin Saints of the Orthodox Patriarchate of Rome.
- The Roman Martyrology. Transl. by the Archbishop of Baltimore. Last Edition, According to the Copy Printed at Rome in 1914. Revised Edition, with the Imprimatur of His Eminence Cardinal Gibbons. Baltimore: John Murphy Company, 1916. p. 203.
- Rev. Richard Stanton. A Menology of England and Wales, or, Brief Memorials of the Ancient British and English Saints Arranged According to the Calendar, Together with the Martyrs of the 16th and 17th Centuries. London: Burns & Oates, 1892. p. 330.

Greek Sources

- Great Synaxaristes: (in Greek) 11 ΙΟΥΛΙΟΥ. ΜΕΓΑΣ ΣΥΝΑΞΑΡΙΣΤΗΣ.
- (in Greek) Συναξαριστής. 11 Ιουλίου. ECCLESIA.GR. (H ΕΚΚΛΗΣΙΑ ΤΗΣ ΕΛΛΑΔΟΣ).
- (in Greek) 11/07/2018. Ορθόδοξος Συναξαριστής.

Russian Sources

- (in Russian) 24 июля (11 июля). Православная Энциклопедия под редакцией Патриарха Московского и всея Руси Кирилла (электронная версия). (Orthodox Encyclopedia - Pravenc.ru).
- (in Russian) 11 июля по старому стилю / 24 июля по новому стилю. СПЖ "Союз православных журналистов". 2018.
- (in Russian) 11 июля (ст.ст.) 24 июля 2014 (нов. ст.). Русская Православная Церковь Отдел внешних церковных связей. (DECR).
