= July 26 (Eastern Orthodox liturgics) =

Day in the Eastern Orthodox liturgical calendar

Eastern Orthodox liturgical calendar
July 25	July 26	July 27
July 26 O.S. ≍ August 8 N.S. July 26 N.S ≍ July 13 O.S.

An Eastern Orthodox cross

July 26 in Eastern Orthodox liturgical calendars is a feast day and a day of commemoration of saints and martyrs. Although some Orthodox churches use the Revised Julian Calendar and others use the traditional Julian calendar, the fixed commemorations for their respective July 26 are broadly the same, no matter which calendar is used. (Note: Despite the dates being the same, the days to which they refer typically differ by 13 days. The notation Old Style or O.S. is sometimes used to indicate a date in the traditional Julian Calendar (the "Old Calendar"). The notation New Style or N.S. indicates a date in the Revised Julian calendar (the "New Calendar").)

== Saints ==
- Nun-martyr Paraskevi of Rome (138–161) (Note: Name days celebrated today include: Paraskevi (Παρασκευή); Paraskevas (Παρασκευᾶς).)
- Martyr Oraiozela of Byzantium, near the Bosphorus, under Domitian (c. 81–96)
- Virgin-martyr Jerusalem of Byzantium, friend of St. Oraiozela, near the Bosphorus (c. 81–96)
- Hieromartyrs Hermolaus, Hermippus and Hermocrates at Nicomedia (c. 305)
- Martyr Appion, by the sword.
- Venerable Moses the Hungarian, of the Kiev Caves Monastery (c. 1043)
- Venerable Ignatius of Mt. Stirion, monk.
- Venerable Symeon the Archimandrite and Stylite. (Note: "Venerable Symeon the Archimandrite and Stylite." He is absent from the Synaxarion of Nicodemus. However his memory is recorded in the "Patmiako" Codex, as well as in "Βιέννης Theol. gr. 300", and in the Synaxarion of Delahaye, without any biographical details.)

== Pre-Schism Western saints ==
- Saint Pastor, a priest in Rome and by tradition the brother of Pope Pius I (c. 160) (Note: "Also, at Rome, St. Pastor, priest. His name is used to designate a cardinal's title in the church of St. Pudentiana, on the Viminal hill.")
- Saints Symphronius, Olympius, Theodulus and Exuperia, all burnt to death under Valerian (257) (Note: Symphronius was a Roman slave who brought about the conversion of the tribune Olympius, the latter's wife Exuperia and their son Theodulus.) (Note: "At Rome, on the Latin road, the holy martyrs Symphronius, Olympius, Theodulus, and Exuperia, who (as we read in the Acts of pope St. Stephen) were burnt alive, and thus obtained the palm of martyrdom.")
- Saint Valens (Valente), Bishop of Verona in Italy from 524 to 531 (531) (Note: "At Verona, St. Valens, bishop and confessor.")
- Saint Simeon of Padolirone (Simeon of Mantua), an Armenian hermit who went on pilgrimage to Jerusalem, Rome, Compostella and Tours (1016) (Note: He was renowned for the miracles he worked on these journeys. Finally he settled at the monastery of Padolirone near Padua in Italy.) (Note: "In the monastery of St. Benedict, near Mantua, St. Simeon, monk and hermit, who was renowned for many miracles, and at an advanced age rested in the Lord.") (Note: "Modern Roman Martyrology, Benedictine Martyrologies. Authority: – A life written not long after his death by a monk of Padolira. The early part of his life was learned from letters of Arsenius, Patriarch of Jerusalem. He was canonized by Benedict VIII; and at the elevation of his body, Leo IX sent a brief to the Bishop of Mantua, approving veneration to the saint.")

== Post-Schism Orthodox saints ==
- Venerable Gerontius, founder of St. Anne's Skete, Mount Athos (13th century)
- Saint Sava III, Archbishop of Serbia (1316)
- Saint Ioannicius the New, Schemamonk of Muscel, Romania (1638)
- Venerable Iakov Netsvetov of Atka Island and Ikogmute, missionary priest to the Yup’ik on the Yukon River, Enlightener of Alaska (1864)
- Saint Isaac, Hieromonk of Svyatogorsk Monastery (1903)
- Saint Theodosius of the Caucasus, Schema-Igumen (Hieroconfessor Theodosius Of Minvody) (1948) (Note: See: (in Russian) Феодосий Кавказский. Википедии. (Russian Wikipedia).)

=== New martyrs and confessors ===
- New Hieromartyr Sergius Strelnikov, Priest (1937)

== Other commemorations ==
- Icon of the Most Holy Theotokos "Of Emvolon" (in Pegadion by the New Colonnade), Constantinople.
- Consecration of the Temple the Holy Archangel Michael in Scallae.
- Consecration of the Temple the Holy Archangel Gabriel in Chaldae.
- Repose of Elder Theophanes of Solovki Monastery (1819)
- Repose of Archimandrite Nathaniel (Pospelov) of Pskov-Caves Monastery (2002)

== Icon gallery ==
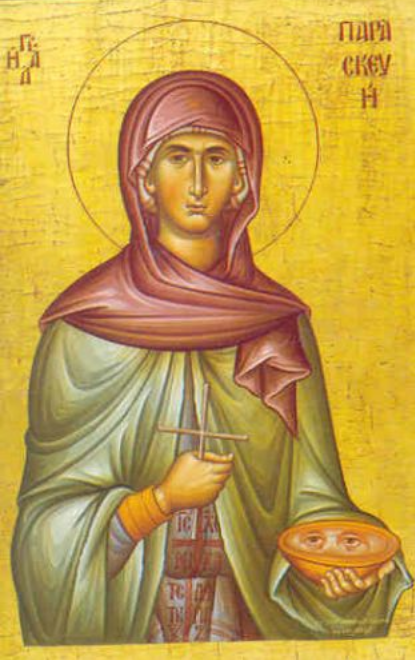
Nun-martyr Paraskevi of Rome.

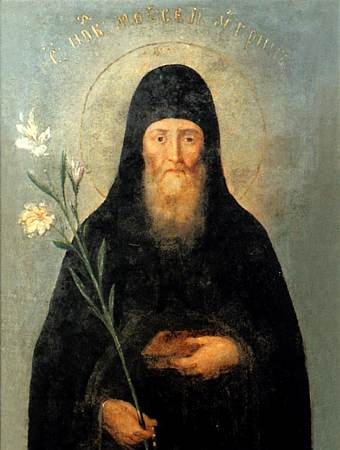
Venerable Moses the Hungarian, of the Kiev Caves Monastery.

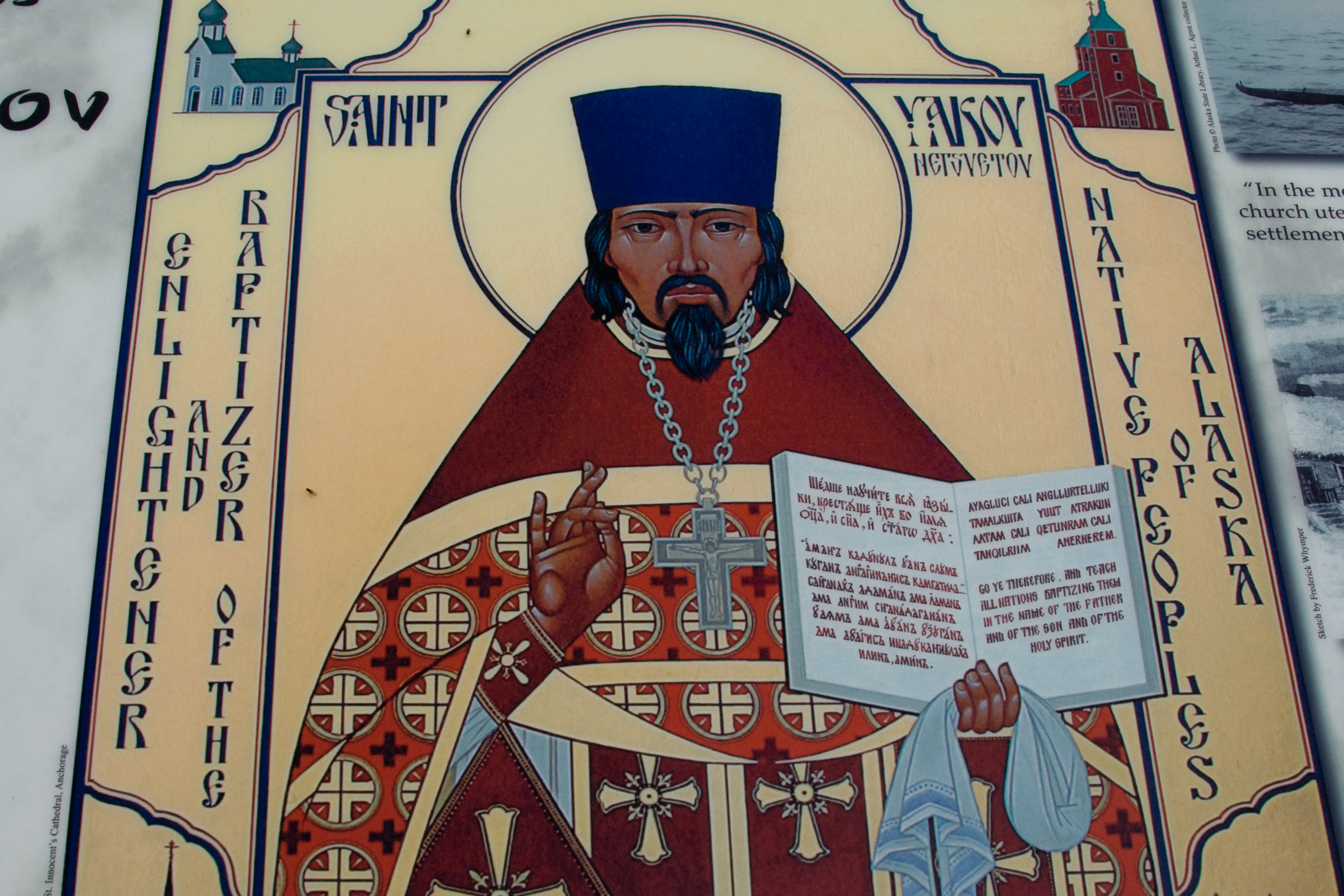
Venerable Iakov Netsvetov, Enlightener of Alaska.

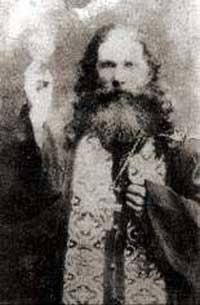
St Theodosius of the Caucasus.

== Sources ==
- July 26/August 8. Orthodox Calendar (PRAVOSLAVIE.RU).
- August 8 / July 26. HOLY TRINITY RUSSIAN ORTHODOX CHURCH (A parish of the Patriarchate of Moscow).
- July 26. OCA - The Lives of the Saints.
- July 25. The Year of Our Salvation - Holy Transfiguration Monastery, Brookline, Massachusetts.
- The Autonomous Orthodox Metropolia of Western Europe and the Americas (ROCOR). St. Hilarion Calendar of Saints for the year of our Lord 2004. St. Hilarion Press (Austin, TX). p. 55.
- The Twenty-Sixth Day of the Month of July. Orthodoxy in China.
- July 26. Latin Saints of the Orthodox Patriarchate of Rome.
- The Roman Martyrology. Transl. by the Archbishop of Baltimore. Last Edition, According to the Copy Printed at Rome in 1914. Revised Edition, with the Imprimatur of His Eminence Cardinal Gibbons. Baltimore: John Murphy Company, 1916. p. 221.
- Rev. Richard Stanton. A Menology of England and Wales, or, Brief Memorials of the Ancient British and English Saints Arranged According to the Calendar, Together with the Martyrs of the 16th and 17th Centuries. London: Burns & Oates, 1892. pp. 358–362.

Greek Sources

- Great Synaxaristes: (in Greek) 26 ΙΟΥΛΙΟΥ. ΜΕΓΑΣ ΣΥΝΑΞΑΡΙΣΤΗΣ.
- (in Greek) Συναξαριστής. 26 Ιουλίου. ECCLESIA.GR. (H ΕΚΚΛΗΣΙΑ ΤΗΣ ΕΛΛΑΔΟΣ).
- (in Greek) 26/07/2026. Ορθόδοξος Συναξαριστής.

Russian Sources

- (in Russian) 8 августа (26 июля). Православная Энциклопедия под редакцией Патриарха Московского и всея Руси Кирилла (электронная версия). (Orthodox Encyclopedia - Pravenc.ru).
- (in Russian) 26 июля по старому стилю / 8 августа по новому стилю. СПЖ "Союз православных журналистов". 2026.
- (in Russian) 26 июля (ст.ст.) 8 августа 2026 (нов. ст.). Русская Православная Церковь Отдел внешних церковных связей. (DECR).
