= July 13 (Eastern Orthodox liturgics) =

Day in the Eastern Orthodox liturgical calendar

Eastern Orthodox liturgical calendar
July 12	July 13	July 14
July 13 O.S. ≍ July 26 N.S. July 13 N.S ≍ June 30 O.S.

An Eastern Orthodox cross

July 13 in Eastern Orthodox liturgical calendars is a feast day and a day of commemoration of saints and martyrs. Although some Orthodox churches use the Revised Julian Calendar and others use the traditional Julian calendar, the fixed commemorations for their respective July 13 are broadly the same, no matter which calendar is used. (Note: Despite the dates being the same, the days to which they refer typically differ by 13 days. The notation Old Style or O.S. is sometimes used to indicate a date in the traditional Julian Calendar (the "Old Calendar"). The notation New Style or N.S. indicates a date in the Revised Julian calendar (the "New Calendar").)

== Saints ==
- Synaxis of the Holy Archangel Gabriel.
- Martyr Serapion, under Severus (c. 205) (Note: "Also, St. Serapion, martyr, who obtained the crown of martyrdom by fire, in the time of the emperor Severus and the governor Aquila.") (see also: July 12)
- Martyr Marcian of Iconium (258) (see also: July 11)
- Venerable Abbess Sarah of Scetis (370)
- Martyr Golinduc, in holy baptism Mary, of Persia (591) (see also: July 12)
- Venerable Stephen the Sabaite (Stephen the Hymnographer) (794 or 807)

== Pre-Schism Western saints ==
- Saint Julian of Le Mans, Bishop of Cenomanis (Le Mans) in (Gaul) (1st or 3rd century) (Note: Venerated as the first Bishop of Le Mans in France.) (see also: January 27 - West)
- Saint Dogfan (Doewan), martyred by heathen in Dyfed in Wales where a church was dedicated to him (5th century)
- Saint Just of Penwith, monk, of Cornwall (5th century)
- Saints Eugene, Bishop of Carthage, Salutaris, Archdeacon of Carthage, Muritta the Deacon, and Companions, Confessors (505) (Note: Eugene became Bishop of Carthage in North Africa in 481 but was soon afterwards expelled by the Arian Vandals with many of his flock, some of them mere boys. They were exiled to the desert of Tripoli, where they suffered greatly. In 488 they were allowed to return to Carthage, but Eugene was exiled again eight years later and reposed at Albi in Italy. All the above are considered to be martyrs because of their sufferings.) (Note: "In Africa, the holy confessors Eugenius, the faithful and virtuous bishop of Carthage, and all the clergy of that church, to the number of about five hundred or more, among whom were many small children employed as lectors. In the persecution of the Vandals, under the Arian king Hunneric, they were subjected to scourging and starvation, and driven into a most painful banishment, which they bore with joy for God's sake. In their number were also two distinguished personages, the archdeacon Salutaris, and Muritta, occupying the second rank among the ministers of the church. Both had three times confessed the faith, and were illustrious by their sturdy perseverance in Christianity.")
- Venerable Abbess Mildred of Thanet, Abbess of Minster-in-Thanet Convent (c. 733) (see also: February 20)
- Saint Turiaf of Dol (Turiav, Turiavus), successor of St. Samson as Bishop of Dol in Brittany (c. 750) (Note: "In Bretagne, St. Turian, bishop and confessor, a man of admirable simplicity and innocence.")

== Post-Schism Orthodox saints ==
- The holy Five Martyrs of Alamannia who suffered in Cyprus:

- Heliophotus, Epaphrodites, Ammon, Auxouthenius, and Euthenius, monks, of Cyprus (12th century) (Note: The 300 Allemagne Saints came to Cyprus from Palestine, and lived as ascetics in various parts of the island. According to some of their lives in the Great Synaxaristes, after the dissolution of the Second Crusade (1147 - 1149), they decided to live the monastic life in the Jordan desert. However since the Latins there disturbed them, they relocated to Cyprus and dispersed over the island.)

- Saint Onesiphorus, born in Constantinople, ascetic in Cyprus and Wonderworker.

=== New martyrs and confessors ===
- Holy Children-Martyrs Of Jastrebarško and Sisak (1942)

== Other commemorations ==
- Icon of the Most Holy Theotokos "Axion Estin" ("It is Truly Meet"). (see also: June 11)
- Translation of the relics (early 11th century) of St. Juthwara of Cornwal (6th century) to Sherborne Abbey. (Note: "ST. JUTHWARE was the sister of St. Sidwell, the Virgin and Martyr, who is honoured at Exeter on the 1st August. Two other sisters, Edware and Willgith, are also venerated as Saints. They are supposed to have been of an ancient British family, and to have flourished about the year 700.")
- Synaxis of the Saints of Hilandar, Mt. Athos.
- Repose of Constantine Oprisan of Jilava, Romania (1959) (Note: See: (in Romanian) Constantin Oprișan. Wikipedia. (Romanian Wikipedia).)
- Uncovering of the relics (1987) of Venerable Niphon (Ionescu) of Prodromou Skete (1899) (Note: He reposed on December 5, 1899.) (see also: October 18 - Glorification)

== Icon gallery ==
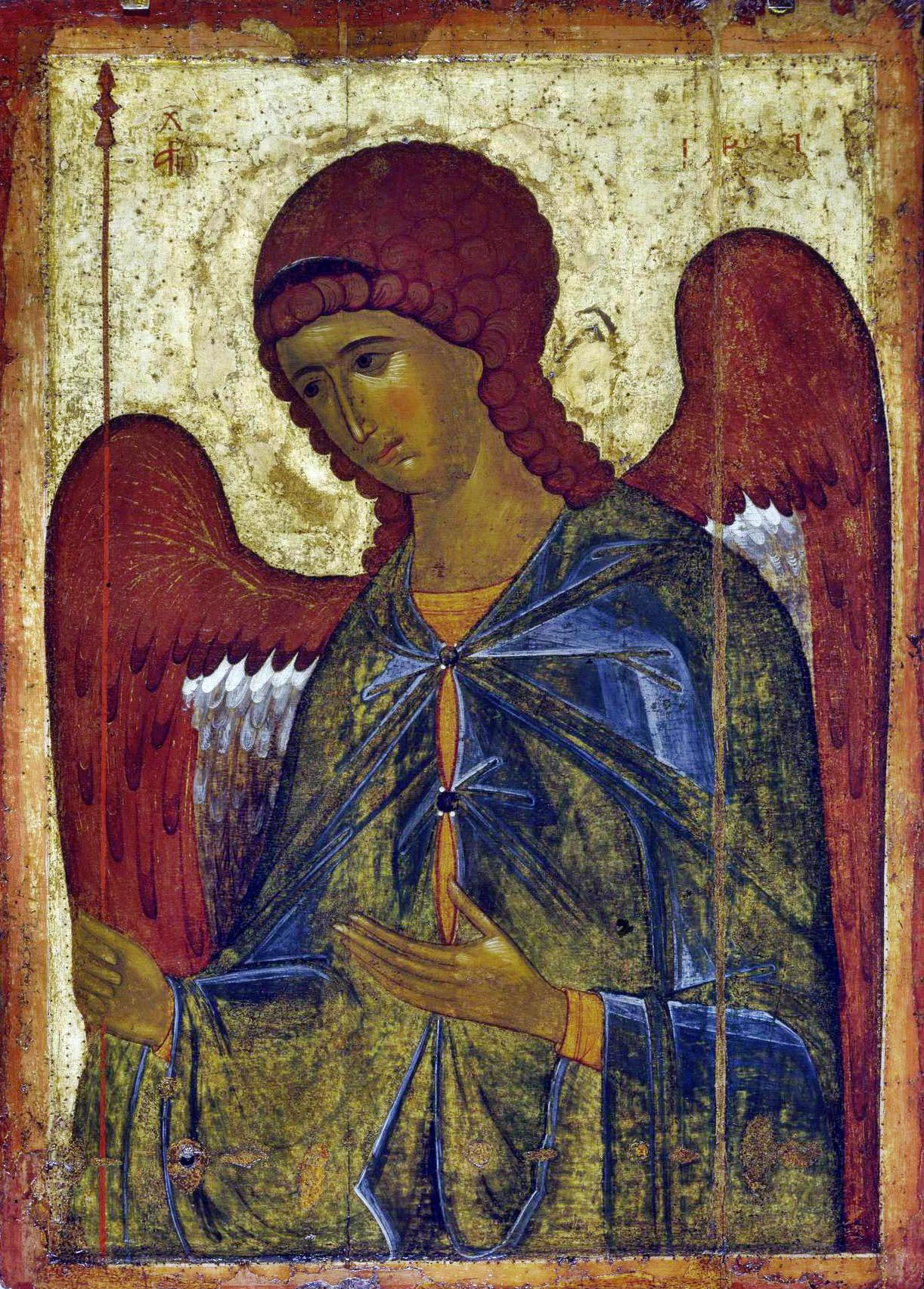
Holy Archangel Gabriel.

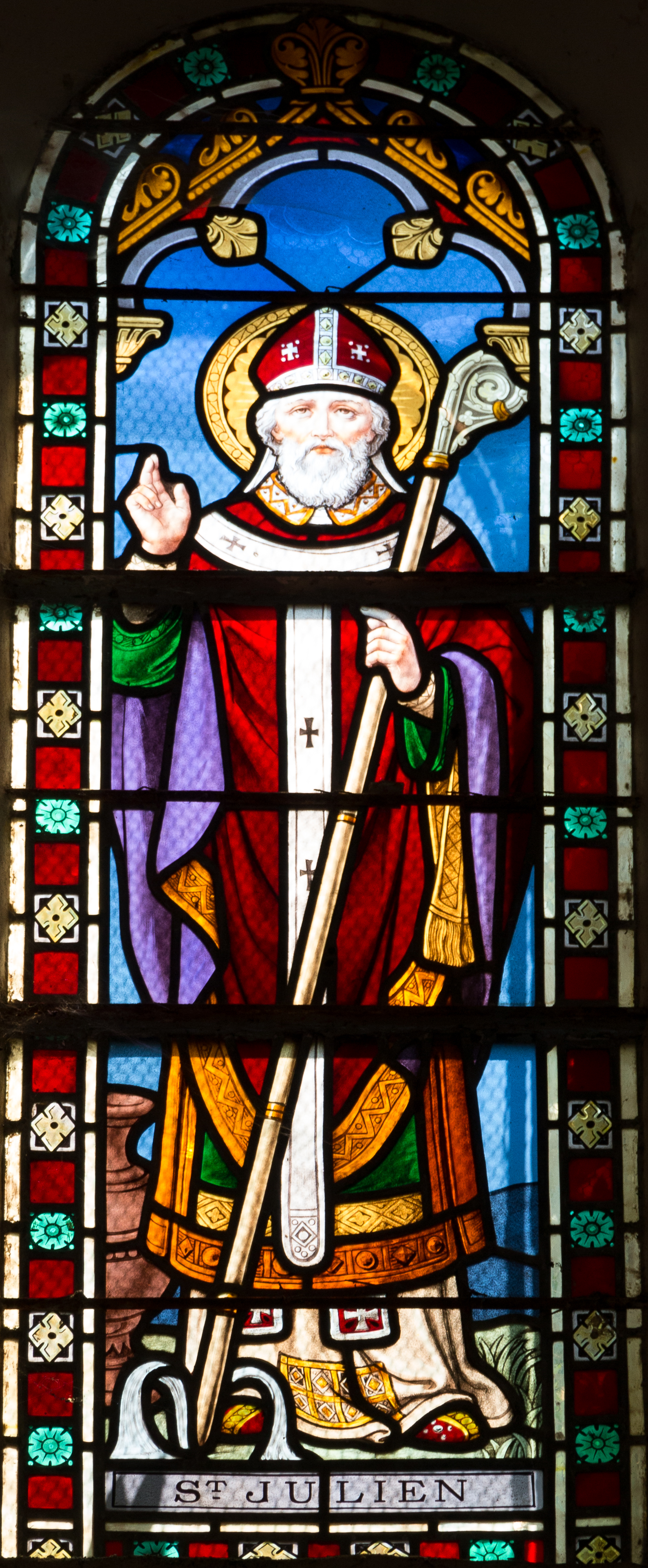
St. Julian of Le Mans.

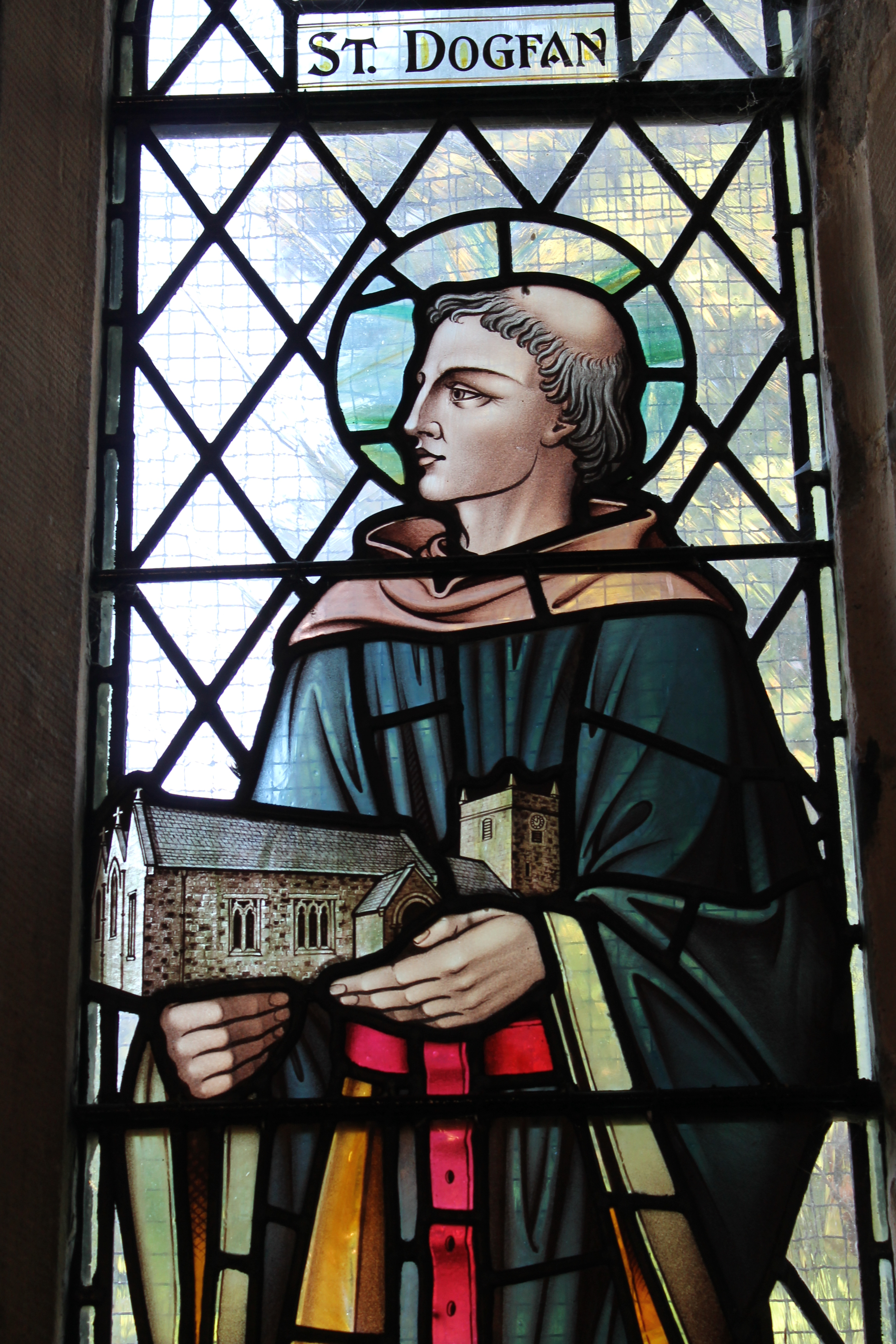
St. Dogfan.

== Sources ==
- July 13/July 26. Orthodox Calendar (PRAVOSLAVIE.RU).
- July 26 / July 13. HOLY TRINITY RUSSIAN ORTHODOX CHURCH (A parish of the Patriarchate of Moscow).
- July 13. OCA - The Lives of the Saints.
- The Autonomous Orthodox Metropolia of Western Europe and the Americas (ROCOR). St. Hilarion Calendar of Saints for the year of our Lord 2004. St. Hilarion Press (Austin, TX). p. 51.
- The Thirteenth Day of the Month of July. Orthodoxy in China.
- July 13. Latin Saints of the Orthodox Patriarchate of Rome.
- The Roman Martyrology. Transl. by the Archbishop of Baltimore. Last Edition, According to the Copy Printed at Rome in 1914. Revised Edition, with the Imprimatur of His Eminence Cardinal Gibbons. Baltimore: John Murphy Company, 1916. pp. 205–206.
- Rev. Richard Stanton. A Menology of England and Wales, or, Brief Memorials of the Ancient British and English Saints Arranged According to the Calendar, Together with the Martyrs of the 16th and 17th Centuries. London: Burns & Oates, 1892. pp. 332–334.

Greek Sources

- Great Synaxaristes: (in Greek) 13 ΙΟΥΛΙΟΥ. ΜΕΓΑΣ ΣΥΝΑΞΑΡΙΣΤΗΣ.
- (in Greek) Συναξαριστής. 13 Ιουλίου. ECCLESIA.GR. (H ΕΚΚΛΗΣΙΑ ΤΗΣ ΕΛΛΑΔΟΣ).
- (in Greek) 13/07. Ορθόδοξος Συναξαριστής.

Russian Sources

- (in Russian) 26 июля (13 июля). Православная Энциклопедия под редакцией Патриарха Московского и всея Руси Кирилла (электронная версия). (Orthodox Encyclopedia - Pravenc.ru).
- (in Russian) 13 июля по старому стилю / 26 июля по новому стилю. СПЖ "Союз православных журналистов". 2018.
- (in Russian) 13 июля (ст.ст.) 26 июля 2014 (нов. ст.). Русская Православная Церковь Отдел внешних церковных связей. (DECR).
