= June 29 (Eastern Orthodox liturgics) =

Day in the Eastern Orthodox liturgical calendar

Eastern Orthodox liturgical calendar
| June 28 | June 29 | June 30 |
June 29 O.S. ≍ July 12 N.S. June 29 N.S ≍ June 16 O.S.

Icon of the Holy, Glorious and All-Praised Leaders of the Apostles, Peter and Paul. (Byzantine & Christian Museum, Athens).

June 29 in Eastern Orthodox liturgical calendars is a feast day and a day of commemoration of saints and martyrs. Although some Orthodox churches use the Revised Julian Calendar and others use the traditional Julian calendar, the fixed commemorations for their respective June 29 are broadly the same, no matter which calendar is used. (Note: Despite the dates being the same, the days to which they refer typically differ by 13 days. The notation Old Style or O.S. is sometimes used to indicate a date in the traditional Julian Calendar (the "Old Calendar"). The notation New Style or N.S. indicates a date in the Revised Julian calendar (the "New Calendar").)

== Saints ==
- The Holy, Glorious and All-Praised Leaders of the Apostles, Peter and Paul (67) (Note: Peter the Apostle (c. 64). "Simon, son of Jonah, was a married fisherman who lived in Bethsaida. He was a disciple of St John the Baptist before he was called, after his elder brother Andrew, to be a disciple of Christ. He was called 'Rock' (Cephas, Petros, Petra, Peter) because of his confession of Christ as the Son of God. Peter was a witness of many important events such as the Transfiguration and the Agony in the Garden. After Christ's Ascension he founded the Church in Antioch and visited the Church in Rome founded by the Apostle Paul. Here he was martyred, head downwards in the circus of Nero, and was buried on the Vatican Hill. He is commemorated together with the Apostle Paul on 29 June and his relics are enshrined beneath the altar of St Peter's in Rome to this day.") (Note: Paul the Apostle (c. 65). "Born in Tarsus in Cilicia, a Pharisee, a Roman citizen and a tentmaker by trade, he was originally called Saul and was educated in the Law of the Jews in Jerusalem. After taking part in the stoning of the first Orthodox martyr, St Stephen, he was miraculously converted on the road to Damascus and received his mission to enlighten the Gentiles. He did so in at least four Apostolic journeys, extending perhaps as far as Spain, establishing churches everywhere and surrounded by dangers of all sorts. Nevertheless he was always zealous for Christ. His thirteen letters, addressed mostly to the Churches which he had founded, belong to divine revelation. According to a very old tradition, he was beheaded in Rome, which Church he had founded, near the Ostian Way.") (Note: "AT Rome, the birthday of the holy apostles Peter and Paul, who suffered martyrdom on the same day, under the emperor Nero. Within the city the former was crucified with his dead downwards, and buried in the Vatican, near the Triumphal way, where he is venerated by the whole world. The latter was put to the sword and buried on the Ostian way, where he receives similar honors.") (Note: Name days celebrated today include: Peter, Petra, Petroula (Πέτρος, Πετρούλα); Paul, Paulina (Παῦλος, Παυλίνα).)
- Saint Mary of Jerusalem, mother of Apostle Mark (1st century) (Note: "In Cyprus, St. Mary, mother of John, surnamed Mark.") (see also: June 30)

== Pre-Schism Western saints ==
- Saint Benedicta (Beata), sister of Sts Augustine and Sanctian, all three were born in Spain but went to France and were martyred in Sens under Aurelian (273) (see also: September 6 )
- Saints Marcellus and Anastasius, Martyred in Bourges in France (274) (Note: Marcellus was beheaded and Anastasius scourged.) (Note: "At Argenton, St. Marcellus, martyr, who was beheaded for the faith of Christ together with the soldier Anastasius.") (Note: "In the territory of Sens, St. Benedicta, virgin.")
- Saint Syrus of Genoa, priest and later Bishop of Genoa in Italy from c. 324 to c. 380, he is the main patron of the city (c. 380) (Note: "At Genoa, the birthday of St. Syrius, bishop.")
- Saint Cassius of Narni, Bishop of Narni in Italy (558) (Note: "At Narni, St. Cassius, bishop of that city, of whom St. Gregory relates, that he permitted scarcely any day of his life to pass without offering the victim of propitiation to Almighty God; and he was well worthy to do it, for he distributed in alms all he possessed, and his devotion was such that abundant tears flowed from his eyes during the holy sacrifice. At last, he came to Rome on the birthday of the Apostles, as was his yearly custom, and after having solemnly celebrated Mass and given the Lord's body and the kiss of peace to all, he departed for heaven.")
- Saint Cocha (Coecha), Abbess of Ross-Benchuir, in County Clare, Ireland (6th century)
- Saints Salome and Judith, anchoresses at Oberalteich Abbey (dedicated to Saints Peter and Paul), in Germany (9th century) (Note: Salome is said to have been a princess from England who was exiled. She was befriended in Bavaria by a pious widow named Judith. Both became anchoresses at Oberaltaich in Germany.)
- Saint Hemma of Gurk (Gemma, Emma), a widow, she founded the monastery of Gurk in Carinthia in Austria and became a nun there (1045)

== Post-Schism Orthodox saints ==
- Saint Gregory (Kallides), Metropolitan of Herakleia and Raidestos (1925) (Note: The translation of his relics, which took place in 1979, is celebrated on October 20. He was canonized in 2003.) (Note: See: (in Greek) Γρηγόριος Καλλίδης. Βικιπαίδεια. (Greek Wikipedia).) (see also: July 25 )
- Venerable Paisios the Athonite (1994) (see also: July 12 )

== Other commemorations ==
- Uncovering of the relics of Saint Nicander of Pskov, hermit (1686)
- Icon of the Mother of God of Kasperov (1853-1855) (Note: See: (in Russian) Касперовская икона Божией Матери. Википедии. (Russian Wikipedia).) (see also: October 1 )
- Synaxis of the Saints of Lesbos.
- Repose of Archbishop Andrew (Rymarenko) of Rockland (New Diveyevo Monastery) (1978) (Note: See: (in Russian) Андрей (Рымаренко). Википедии. (Russian Wikipedia).)

== Icon gallery ==
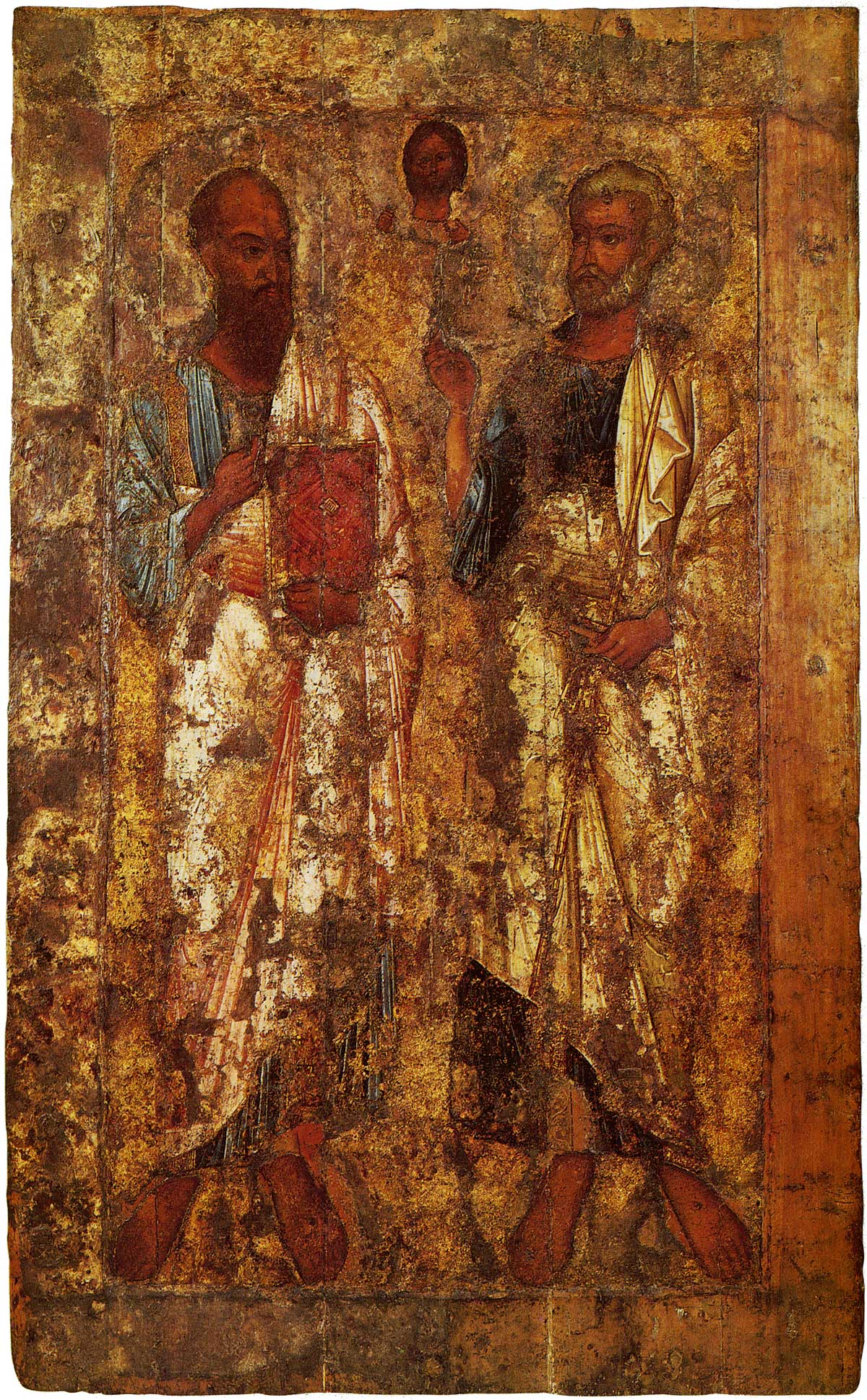
Ancient icon of the Apostles Peter and Paul

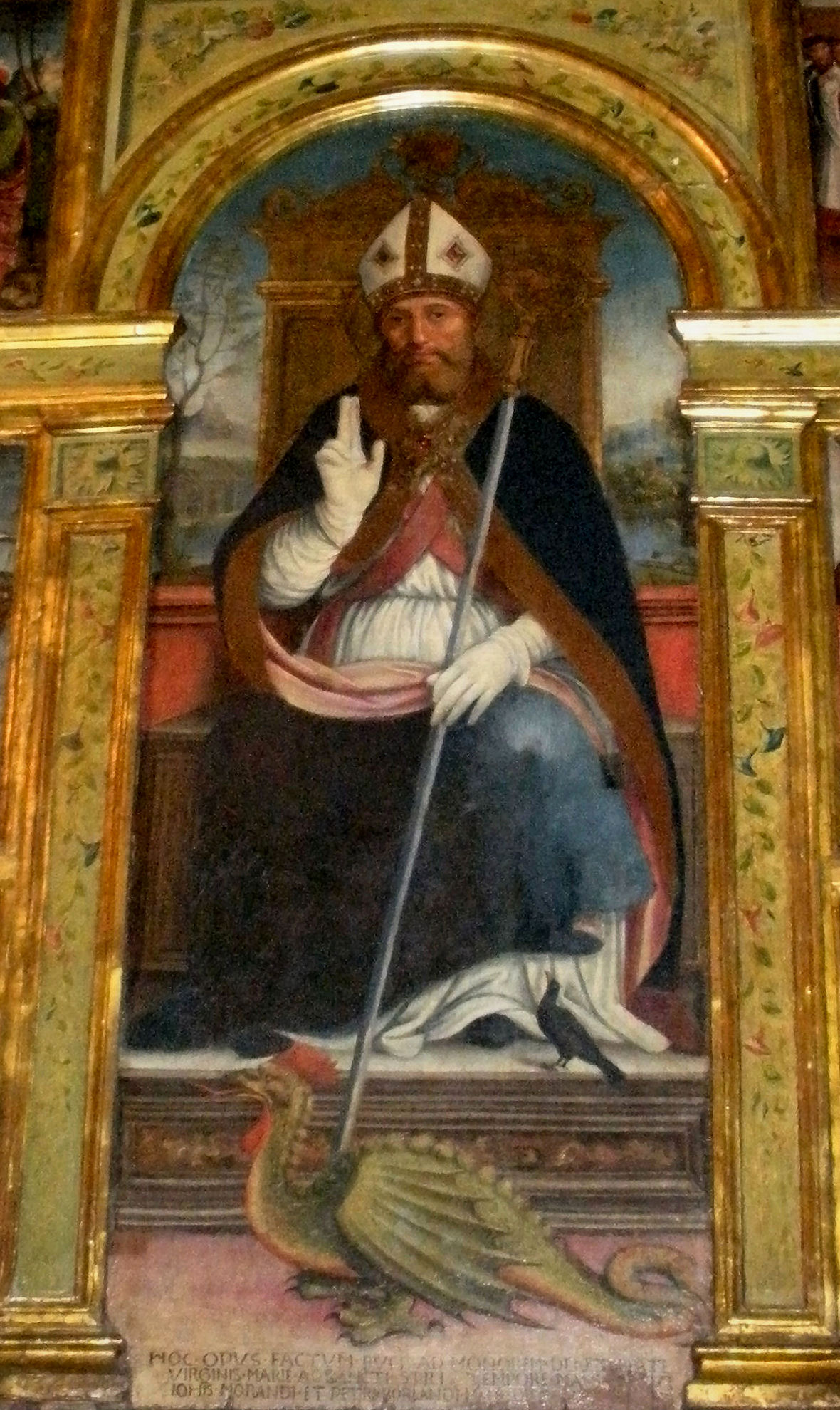
St. Syrus of Genoa, Bishop of Genoa

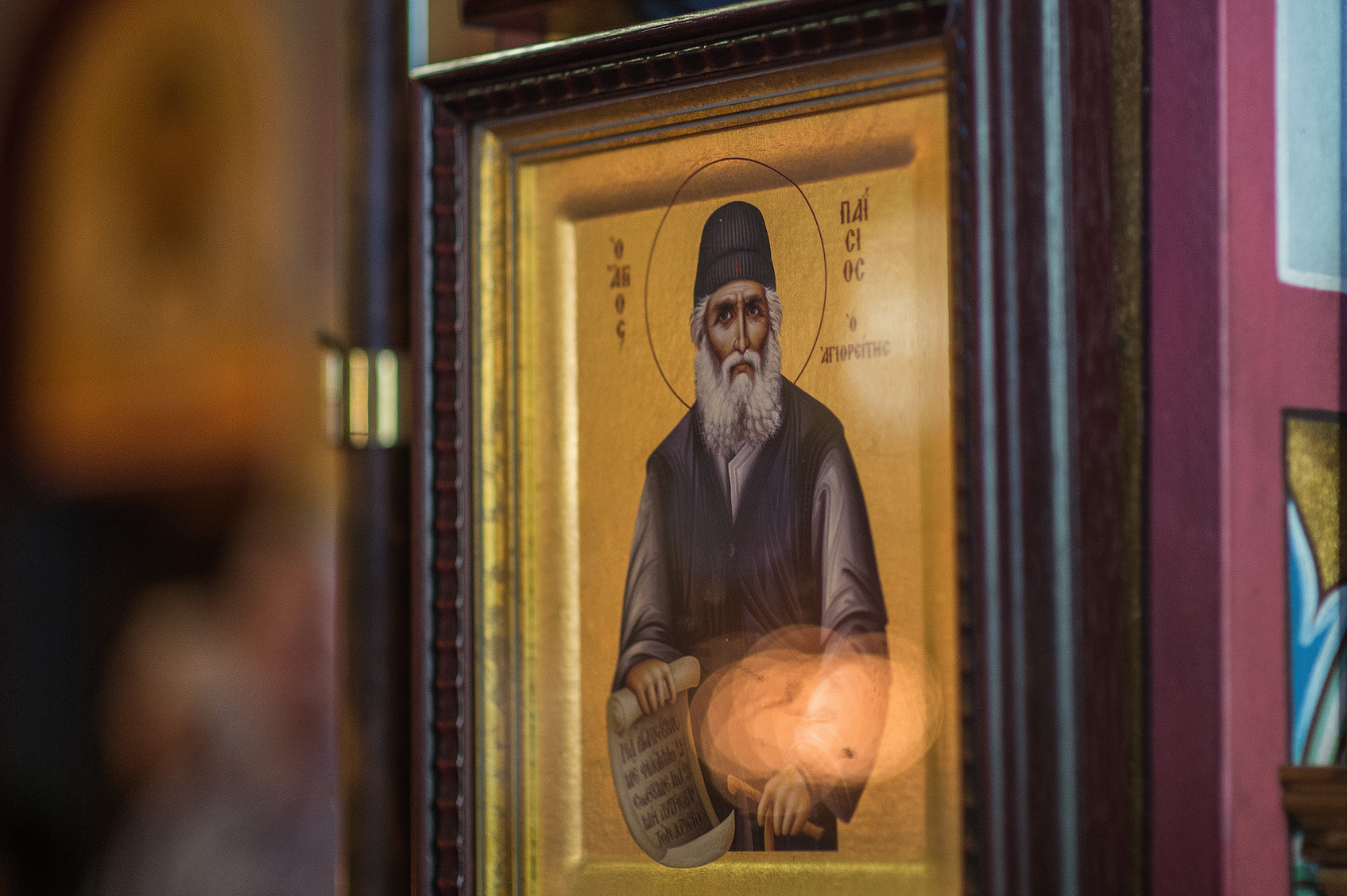
Venerable Paisios the Athonite

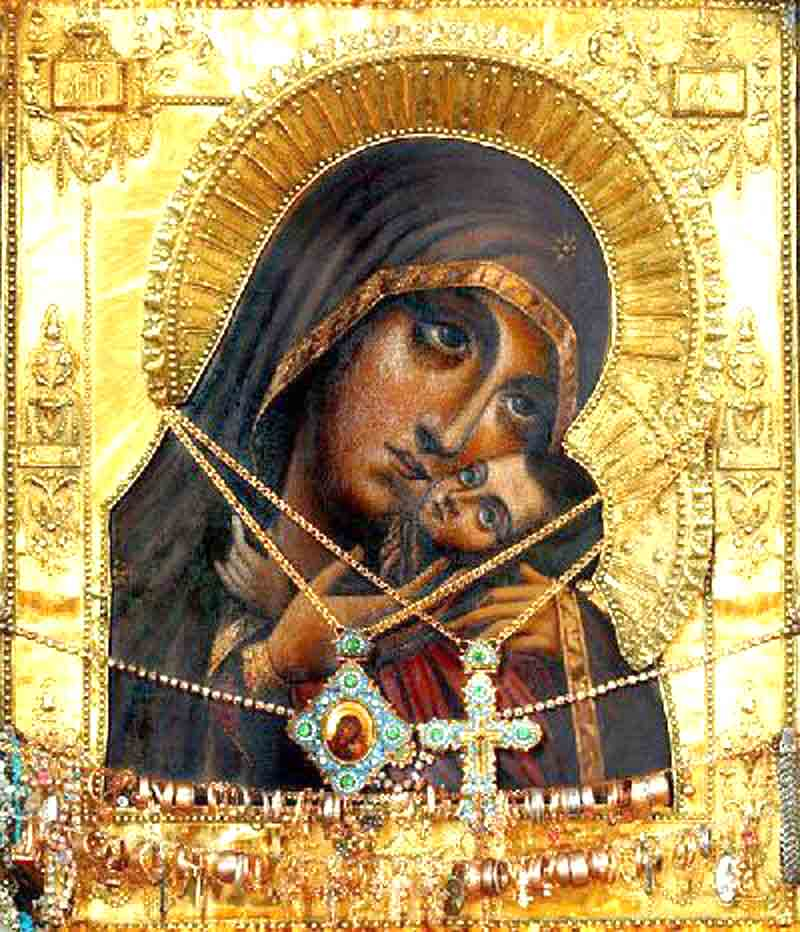
Icon of the Mother of God of Kasperov

== Sources ==
- June 29/July 12. Orthodox Calendar (PRAVOSLAVIE.RU).
- July 12 / June 29. HOLY TRINITY RUSSIAN ORTHODOX CHURCH (A parish of the Patriarchate of Moscow).
- June 29. OCA - The Lives of the Saints.
- June 29. The Year of Our Salvation - Holy Transfiguration Monastery, Brookline, Massachusetts.
- The Autonomous Orthodox Metropolia of Western Europe and the Americas (ROCOR). St. Hilarion Calendar of Saints for the year of our Lord 2004. St. Hilarion Press (Austin, TX). p. 48.
- The Twenty-Ninth Day of the Month of June. Orthodoxy in China.
- June 29. Latin Saints of the Orthodox Patriarchate of Rome.
- The Roman Martyrology. Transl. by the Archbishop of Baltimore. Last Edition, According to the Copy Printed at Rome in 1914. Revised Edition, with the Imprimatur of His Eminence Cardinal Gibbons. Baltimore: John Murphy Company, 1916. pp. 188–189.
- Rev. Richard Stanton. A Menology of England and Wales, or, Brief Memorials of the Ancient British and English Saints Arranged According to the Calendar, Together with the Martyrs of the 16th and 17th Centuries. London: Burns & Oates, 1892. pp. 294–294.

Greek Sources

- Great Synaxaristes: (in Greek) 29 ΙΟΥΝΙΟΥ. ΜΕΓΑΣ ΣΥΝΑΞΑΡΙΣΤΗΣ.
- (in Greek) Συναξαριστής. 29 Ιουνίου. ECCLESIA.GR. (H ΕΚΚΛΗΣΙΑ ΤΗΣ ΕΛΛΑΔΟΣ).
- (in Greek) 29 Ιουνίου. Αποστολική Διακονία της Εκκλησίας της Ελλάδος (Apostoliki Diakonia of the Church of Greece).
- (in Greek) 29/06/2018. Ορθόδοξος Συναξαριστής.

Russian Sources

- (in Russian) 12 июля (29 июня). Православная Энциклопедия под редакцией Патриарха Московского и всея Руси Кирилла (электронная версия). (Orthodox Encyclopedia - Pravenc.ru).
- (in Russian) 29 июня по старому стилю / 12 июля по новому стилю. Русская Православная Церковь - Православный церковный календарь на 2017 год.
- (in Russian) 29 июня (ст.ст.) 12 июля 2014 (нов. ст.). Русская Православная Церковь Отдел внешних церковных связей. (DECR).
