= Nissen (surname) =

Nissen is a surname. As a Danish surname, it is a patronymic meaning "son of Nis" (Danish short form of Nicholas). Notable people with the surname include:

- Aagot Nissen (1882–1978), Norwegian actress
- Anja Nissen (born 1995), Australian pop singer
- Annemarie Nissen (born 1994), Danish long-distance runner
- Bernt A. Nissen (1892–1970), Norwegian journalist
- Bjarne Nissen (1869–1950), Norwegian brewer
- Brian Nissen (1927–2001), British actor
- Bruce Nissen (born 1948), American historian
- Bubba Nissen (born 1960), American NASCAR driver
- Carolina Nissen (born 1976), Chilean singer
- Charles Nissen (d. 1944), British philatelist
- Christian Nissen (1893 – after 1955), German sailor
- Dian Nissen (born 1961), American trampoline competitor
- Erika Nissen (1845–1903), Norwegian pianist
- Fernanda Nissen (1862–1920), Norwegian politician and journalist
- Friedrich Georg Nissen (1887–1969), Norwegian civil servant
- Georg Nikolaus von Nissen (1761–1826), Danish diplomat and music historian
- George Nissen (1914–2010), American inventor of the modern trampoline
- Glen Nissen (born 1966), Australian rugby league footballer
- Greta Nissen (1906–1988), Norwegian-American actress
- Hanne Nissen (born 1970), Danish footballer
- Hans-Hermann Nissen (1893–1980), German opera singer
- Hartvig Nissen (1815–1874), Norwegian philologist and educator
- Hartvig Nissen (gymnast) (1857–1924), Norwegian gymnast
- Heinrich Nissen (1839–1912), German professor of ancient history
- Helge Nissen (1871–1926), Danish opera singer, voice teacher
- Henrik Nissen (1848–1915), Norwegian architect
- Henry Nissen (born 1948), Australian boxer
- Henry Nissen (weightlifter) (1906–1978), Danish weightlifter
- Hilde Nissen (1921–2015), Danish sprinter
- Inge Nissen, Danish basketball player and coach
- Ingjald Nissen (1896–1977), Norwegian psychologist and philosopher
- Jerry Nissen (1884–1954), American football player and coach
- Johan Nissen (born 1958), Danish new media artist
- John Nissen, British inventor
- Jørn Nissen (born 1949), Danish politician
- Karl Nissen (1879–1920), Norwegian journalist and conductor
- Kris Nissen (born 1960), Danish racing driver
- Kyle Nissen (born 1979), Canadian freestyle skier
- Ludwig Nissen (1855–1924), American jeweller
- Mads Nissen (born 1979), Danish photographer
- Margret Nissen (born 1938), German photographer
- Nikolaj Nissen (1627–1684), Danish judge
- Oscar Nissen (1843–1911), Norwegian physician, newspaper editor and politician
- Peder Nissen (born 1976), Danish badminton player
- Peter L. Nissen (1924–2024), Norwegian aviator and businessperson
- Peter Norman Nissen (1871–1930), British Army officer, engineer and inventor
- Rasmus Nissen (footballer, born 2001), Danish footballer
- Rasmus Tønder Nissen (1822–1882), Norwegian politician
- Regina Nissen (born 1961), German swimmer
- Rikke Nissen (1834–1892), Norwegian nursing teacher
- Rudolph Nissen (1896–1981), German-Swiss surgeon
- Saint Nissen, Early Irish abbot and saint
- Steven Nissen (born 1948), American cardiologist
- Svend Nissen (1918–2009), Danish speedway rider
- Thisbe Nissen, American author
- Ulli Nissen (born 1959), German politician
- Ulrik Christian Nissen (1691–1756), Danish nobleman

== See also ==
- Nissen (disambiguation)
