= July 24 (Eastern Orthodox liturgics) =

Day in the Eastern Orthodox liturgical calendar

Eastern Orthodox liturgical calendar
July 23	July 24	July 25
July 24 O.S. ≍ August 6 N.S. July 24 N.S ≍ July 11 O.S.

An Eastern Orthodox cross

July 24 in Eastern Orthodox liturgical calendars is a feast day and a day of commemoration of saints and martyrs. Although some Orthodox churches use the Revised Julian Calendar and others use the traditional Julian calendar, the fixed commemorations for their respective July 24 are broadly the same, no matter which calendar is used. (Note: Despite the dates being the same, the days to which they refer typically differ by 13 days. The notation Old Style or O.S. is sometimes used to indicate a date in the traditional Julian Calendar (the "Old Calendar"). The notation New Style or N.S. indicates a date in the Revised Julian calendar (the "New Calendar").)

== Saints ==
- Saint Athenagoras of Athens, Apologist (c. 190)
- Saint Christina the Great Martyr (Christina of Tyre) (c. 300) (Note: "At Tyro, in Tuscany, on lake Bolsena, St. Christina, virgin and martyr. Believing in Christ, and breaking up her father's gold and silver idols to give them to the poor, she was cruelly scourged by his command, subjected to other most severe torments, and thrown with a heavy stone into the lake, from which she was drawn out by an angel. Then under another judge, who succeeded her father, she bore courageously still more bitter tortures. Finally, after she had been shut up by the governor Julian in a burning furnace for five days without any injury, and after being cured of the sting of serpents, she ended her martyrdom by having her tongue cut out, and being pierced with arrows.".) (Note: Probably born in Rome, she was a virgin martyred near Lake Bolsena in Tuscany.) (Note: Name days celebrated today include: Christina (Χριστίνα).)
- Martyrs Capito and Hymenaeus, by the sword. (Note: "Also, the holy martyrs Meneus and Capito.")
- Martyr Hermogenes, by having his teeth pulled out, dying of infection and bleeding.
- Saint Salumptinus, a Bishop of Jerusalem. (Note: This unknown saint is recorded in the Jerusalemtic Canonarion (on page 100).)
- Holy Martyrs and Passion-bearers Boris and Gleb of Russia, in holy baptism Romanus and David (1015) (Note: KONDAK, TONE 3: "Today your truly-glorious memory shines forth, O Noble Passion-Bearers of Christ, Boris and Gleb, summoning us to praise Christ our God. Therefore, hastening to your reliquary, we receive the gift of healing through your prayers, Holy Ones, for you are Divine physicians.")
- Venerable Hilarion of Tvali, Georgia (1041)

== Pre-Schism Western saints ==
- Saints Victor, Stercatius and Antinogenes, by tradition three brothers martyred in Merida in Estremadura in Spain (304) (Note: "At Merida, in Spain, St. Victor, a military man, who, with his two brothers, Stercatius and Antinogenes, by various torments consummated his martyrdom in the persecution of Diocletian.")
- Saint Vincent, a martyr in Rome outside the walls of the city, on the road to Tivoli. (Note: "At Rome, on the Tiburtine road, St. Vincent, martyr.")
- Saint Ursicinus of Sens, fourth Bishop of Sens in France and an opponent of Arianism (c. 380) (Note: "At Sens, St.Ursicinus, bishop and confessor.")
- Saint Dictinus, Bishop of Astorga in Spain (420) (Note: An adherent of Priscillianism, he was converted by St Ambrose and renounced his errors at the Council of Toledo (400). Soon afterwards he became Bishop of Astorga in Spain.) (Note: See: (in Spanish) Dictino. Wikipedia. (Spanish Wikipedia).)
- Saint Declán of Ardmore, Bishop of Ardmore in Ireland (5th century)
- Saint Lewina (Leofwynn), a Briton and virgin-martyr venerated in Seaford in Sussex, England (5th century)
- Saint Menefrida, patron-saint of Tredresick in Cornwall (5th century)
- Saint Nissen, abbot of Montgarth (Mountgarret) Abbey in Wexford, Ireland.
- Saint Godo (Gaon), born in Verdun, a nephew of St Wandrille, he became a monk at Fontenelle Abbey, later founding the monastery of Oye, near Sezanne-en-Brie (c. 690)
- Saints Wulfhad and Rufinus (Ruffin), princes of Mercia, baptised by St Chad, then put to death by their father (unconverted), at Stone in Staffordshire (7th century) (Note: "These brothers, two holy youths, were put to death by the pagans for having embraced the Christian Faith, in the cell of the hermit who had instructed and baptised them. When Christianity was established in that province, they were greatly venerated, and a church erected over their sacred remains. It is said that the head of St. Wulfhad was carried to Rome by one who was sent to solicit their canonization, and on his return left by him to the Church of St. Lawrence at Viterbo.")
- Saint Christiana, by tradition born in England, she lived a holy life in Flanders and is the patron saint of Termonde in Belgium (7th century) (Note: "In the annals of Belgium and the Gallic Martyrolgy, CHRISTIANA is said to have been the daughter of one of the English kings, who was a pagan. The Virgin was instructed in the Faith by an Angel, who directed her to receive holy baptism. After this she withdrew to the Continent, and took up her abode at Dilkeven, where, after a holy life, she died the death of a Saint. In the year 1092, on the 2nd September, her sacred remains were translated to Dendermund, and there she was honoured among the chief patrons of the place.")
- Saint Sigolena of Albi (Segoulème), a nun in the convent of Troclar on the Tarn in the south of France, where she later became abbess (c. 769) (Note: The commume Lagrave has an archaeological site of the early Middle Ages (Troclar) which was excavated from 1971 to 1998. Archaeological work has restored the monastery of nuns founded by St. Sigolène early 7th century and confirmed the local oral tradition.)
- Saint Aliprandus (Leuprandus), Abbot of St Augustine's in Pavia, Italy (8th century)
- Saint Bernulphus, Bishop of Utrecht (1054)

== Post-Schism Orthodox saints ==
- Venerable Symeon the Newly-Revealed (born 1042) (Note: He was born in Thessaloniki in 1042, in the reign of Empress Zoë Porphyrogenita. After being ordained in Thessaloniki, he departed for the Thebaid in Egypt, where he lived-out the rest of his life ascetically in a cave.)
- Venerable Polycarp of the Kiev Caves, Archimandrite (1182)
- Venerable Pachomius, Abbot, near Vologda (1479)
- New Martyr Theophilus of Zakynthos, burnt alive in Chios (1635)
- Venerable Bogolep, child schemamonk, of Chorny Yar (Black Ravine), near Astrakhan (1654 or 1667)
- New Martyr Athanasius of Kios in Bithynia, beheaded in Constantinople (1670)
- Saint George (Konissky), Bishop of Mogilev (1795) (Note: See: (in Russian) Георгий (Конисский). Википедии. (Russian Wikipedia).)

=== New martyrs and confessors ===
- 17 New Martyrs of Mgarsk Monastery, Poltava (1919):

- Abbot Ambrose;
- Hieromonks Arcadius, Ioannicius, Jonah, Joseph, Nicanor, Athanasius, Theophan, Serapion, Nicostratus, and Julian;
- Monks Ioannicius, Herman, Nazarius, Parthenius, Potapius, and Dorymedon.

- New Hieromartyr Alpheus, Deacon (1937)
- Holy New Martyrs of Prebilovci in Hercegovina (1941)
- New Hiero-confessor Nicholas Pongelsky, Priest (1942)
- New Hiero-confessor John Kalinin, Priest, of Olenevka (1951) (Note: See: (in Russian) Иоанн Оленевский. Википедии. (Russian Wikipedia).)

== Other commemorations ==
- Repose of Blessed Monk Tikhon of Turukhan, on the Yenisei River in Siberia (1682)
- Uncovering of the relics (1994) of Venerable Dalmatus, (Note: See: (in Russian) Далмат Исетский. Википедии. (Russian Wikipedia).) Abbot and founder of the Dormition Monastery in Siberia (1697)

== Icon gallery ==
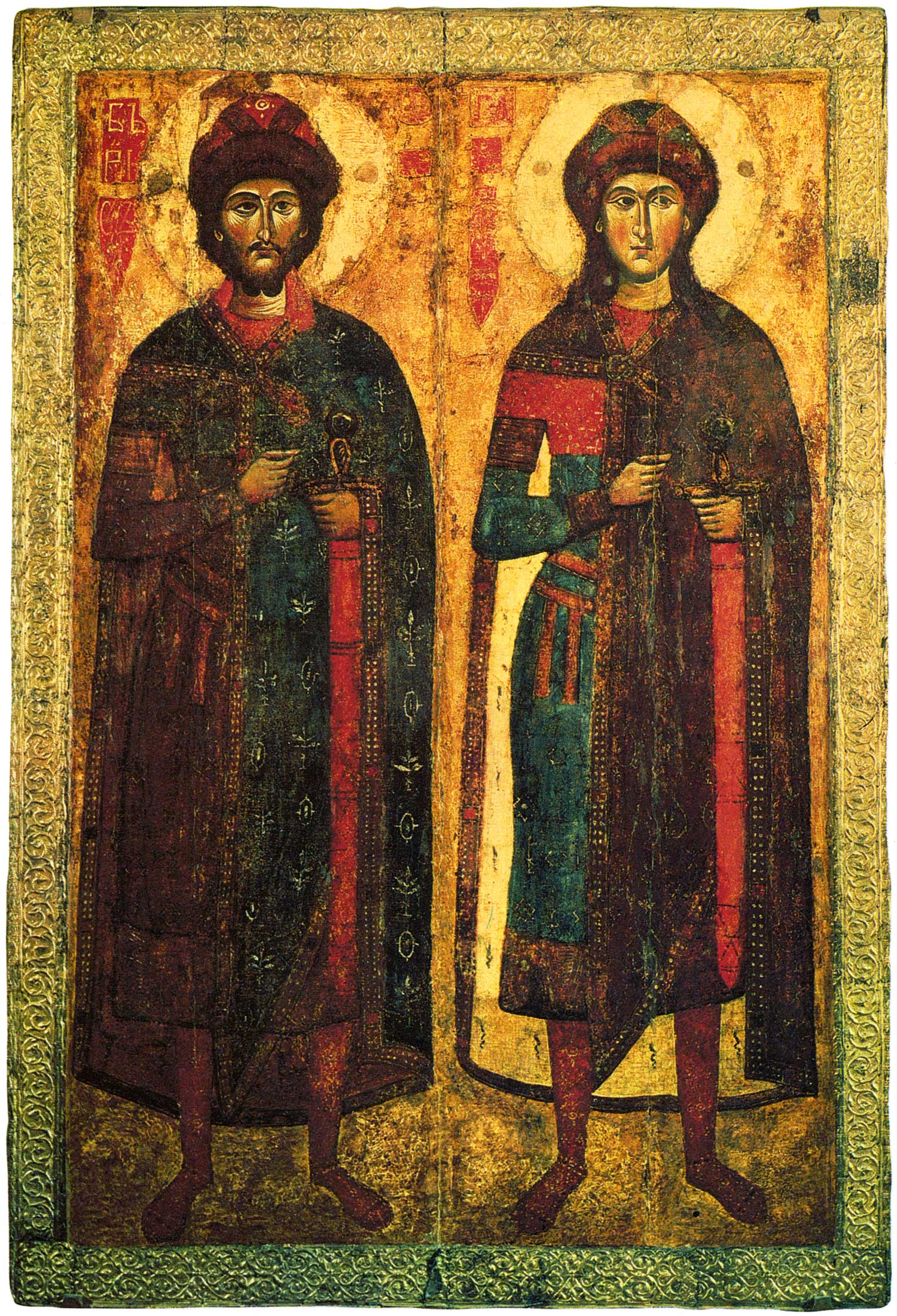
Holy Martyrs and Passion-bearers Boris and Gleb.

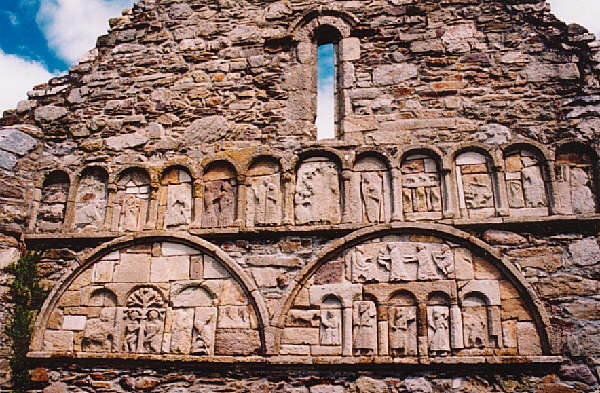
Carvings at Saint Declan's Church, Ardmore.

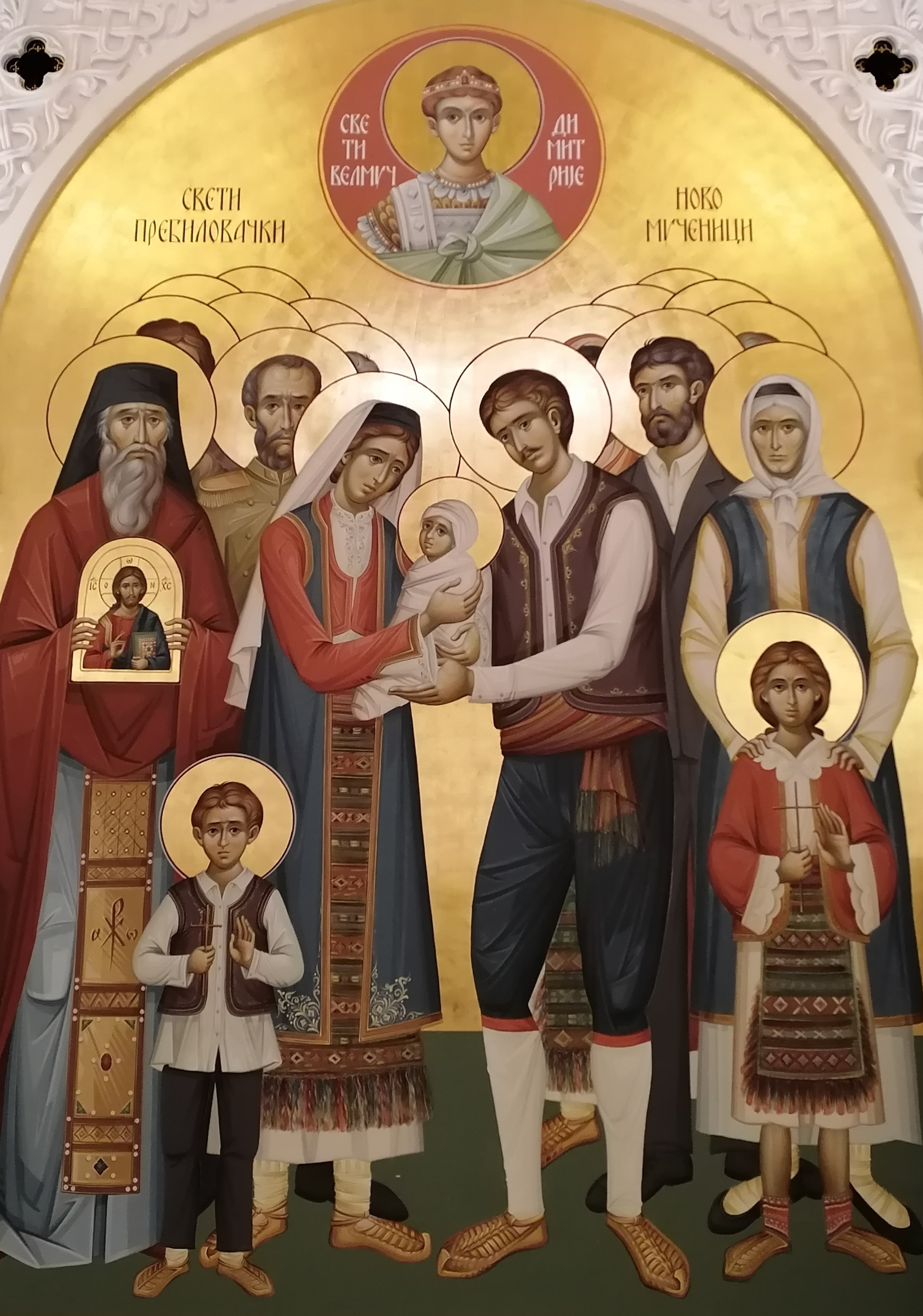
Holy martyrs of Prebilovci in the crypt of the Church of Saint Sava, Belgrade.

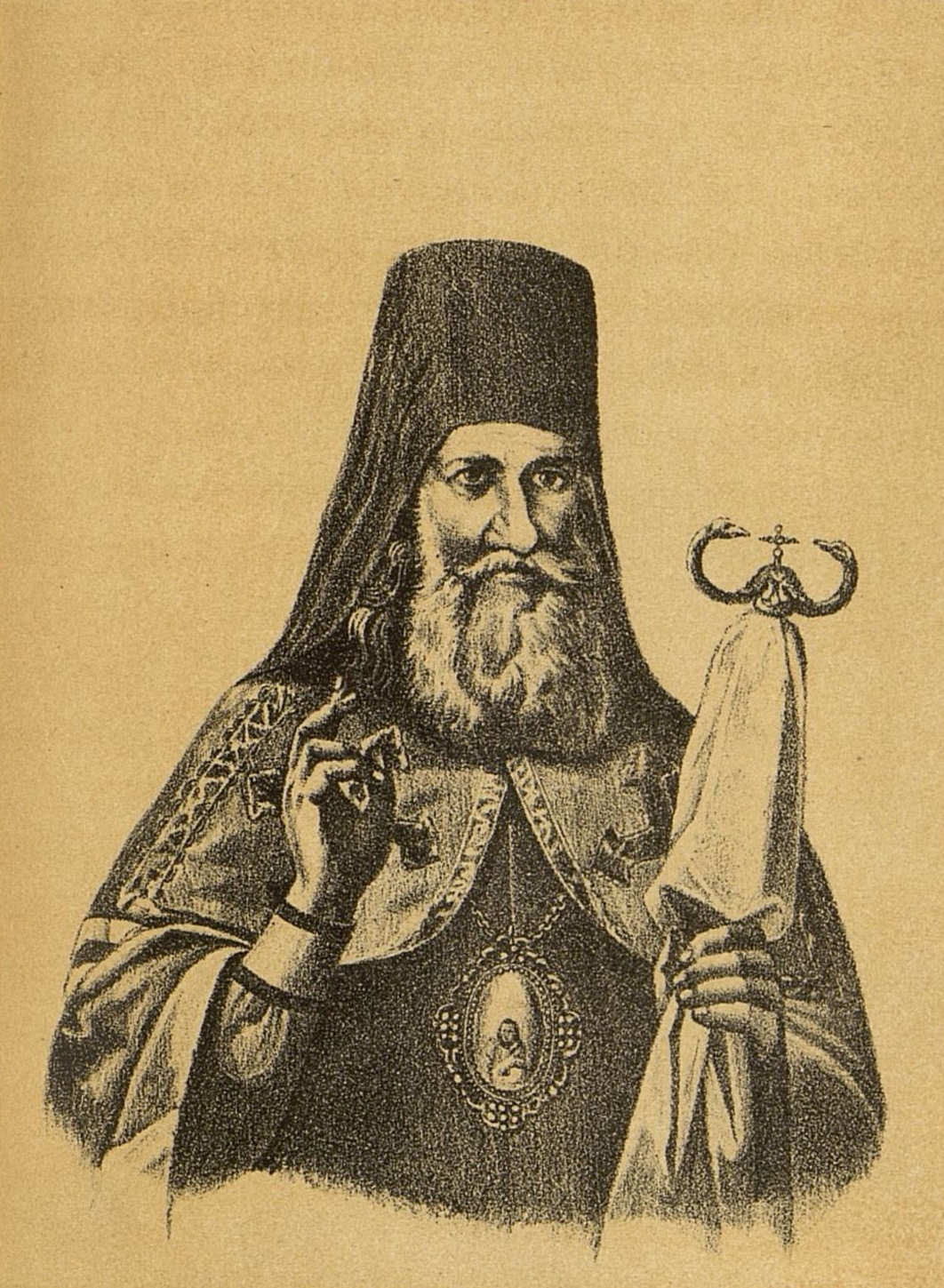
Saint George (Konissky), Bishop of Mogilev.

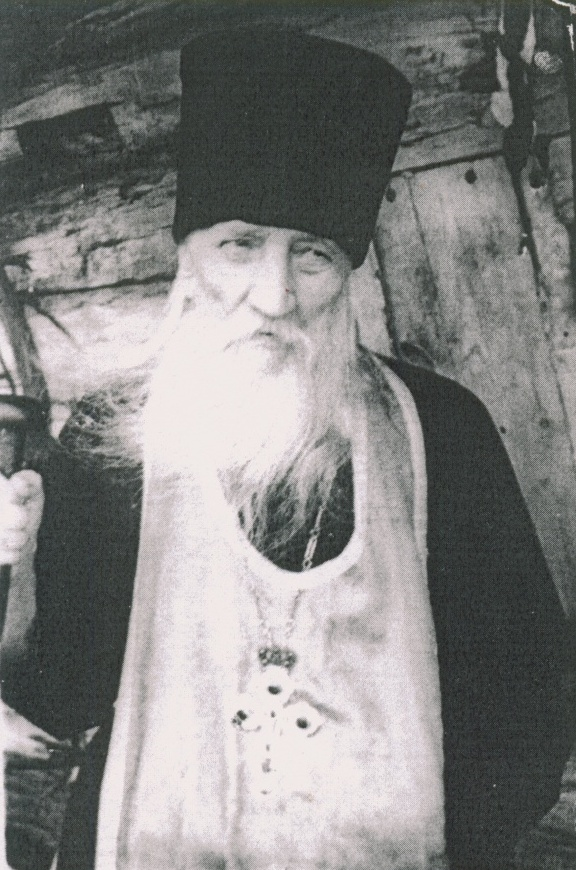
New Hiero-confessor John Kalinin, Priest, of Olenevka.

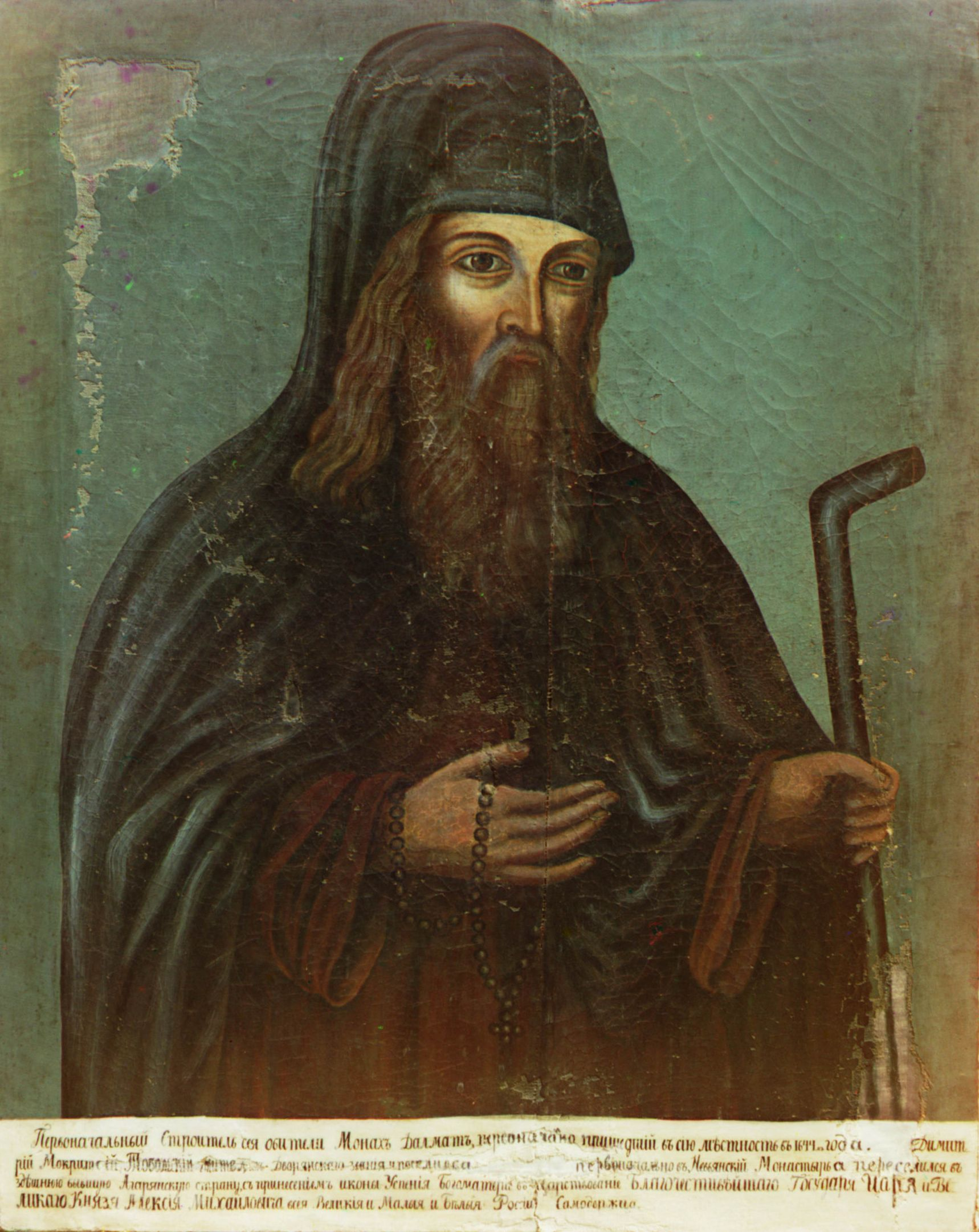
Venerable Dalmatus of Perm.

== Sources ==
- July 24/August 6. Orthodox Calendar (PRAVOSLAVIE.RU).
- August 6 / July 24. HOLY TRINITY RUSSIAN ORTHODOX CHURCH (A parish of the Patriarchate of Moscow).
- July 24. OCA - The Lives of the Saints.
- July 24. The Year of Our Salvation - Holy Transfiguration Monastery, Brookline, Massachusetts.
- The Autonomous Orthodox Metropolia of Western Europe and the Americas (ROCOR). St. Hilarion Calendar of Saints for the year of our Lord 2004. St. Hilarion Press (Austin, TX). p. 54.
- The Twenty-Fourth Day of the Month of July. Orthodoxy in China.
- July 24. Latin Saints of the Orthodox Patriarchate of Rome.
- The Roman Martyrology. Transl. by the Archbishop of Baltimore. Last Edition, According to the Copy Printed at Rome in 1914. Revised Edition, with the Imprimatur of His Eminence Cardinal Gibbons. Baltimore: John Murphy Company, 1916. pp. 218–219.
- Rev. Richard Stanton. A Menology of England and Wales, or, Brief Memorials of the Ancient British and English Saints Arranged According to the Calendar, Together with the Martyrs of the 16th and 17th Centuries. London: Burns & Oates, 1892. pp. 353–357.

Greek Sources

- Great Synaxaristes: (in Greek) 24 ΙΟΥΛΙΟΥ. ΜΕΓΑΣ ΣΥΝΑΞΑΡΙΣΤΗΣ.
- (in Greek) Συναξαριστής. 24 Ιουλίου. ECCLESIA.GR. (H ΕΚΚΛΗΣΙΑ ΤΗΣ ΕΛΛΑΔΟΣ).
- (in Greek) 24/07/2026. Ορθόδοξος Συναξαριστής.

Russian Sources

- (in Russian) 6 августа (24 июля). Православная Энциклопедия под редакцией Патриарха Московского и всея Руси Кирилла (электронная версия). (Orthodox Encyclopedia - Pravenc.ru).
- (in Russian) 24 июля по старому стилю / 6 августа по новому стилю. СПЖ "Союз православных журналистов". 2026.
- (in Russian) 24 июля (ст.ст.) 6 августа 2026 (нов. ст.). Русская Православная Церковь Отдел внешних церковных связей. (DECR).
