= Jurij Moskvitin =

Danish classical pianist (1938–2005)

Jurij Moskvitin (Robert Jurij Moskvitin Hansen, 6 January 1938 – 25 May 2005) was a Danish classical pianist, composer, philosopher, mathematician and boheme.

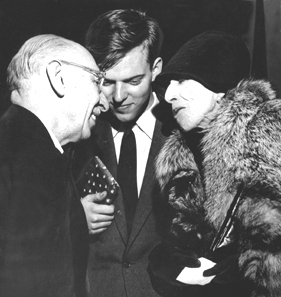
Jurij Moskvitin accompanying Karen Blixen at her meeting with Igor Stravinsky at the Copenhagen City Hall, 1959

Jurij Moskvitin grew up in Denmark; his mother was a Russian aristocrat and his father was a Danish civil engineer. After World War II he studied at The Royal Danish Academy of Music in Copenhagen. He then obtained a master's degree in Philosophy at the University of Copenhagen.

He was a friend of Isak Dinesen (Karen Blixen), Simon Spies, Tao Nørager and Henrik Stangerup.

His works include:

- Essay on The Origin of Thought 1974 (philosophy)
- Det er spændende at tænke 1976 (philosophy)
- Music to the movie "Jorden Er Flad or The Earth is Flat" 1977 by Henrik Stangerup
- Den store undren 1992 (philosophy)
- Simon Spies. Historien om et venskab 1984–1999 (biography)
- Den døve øgle 2001 (Self-Portraits)
- Du må ikke sjuske med dit liv 2008 (biography; Henrik Stangerup)

He was one of the main characters in the documentary "En aften i november" the other being Ilja Bergh. He was also interviewed in the documentary "At skrive eller dø & At forråde virkeligheden" about his relationship with Henrik Stangerup. He regularly appeared in the Danish TV-program "Smagsdommerne" until his death. He also appears in the radio documentary "Eliten fra Minefeltet" where he talks about his relationship to the pianist Klaus Heerfordt.

== Books ==
=== Essay on the Origin of Thought (1974) ===
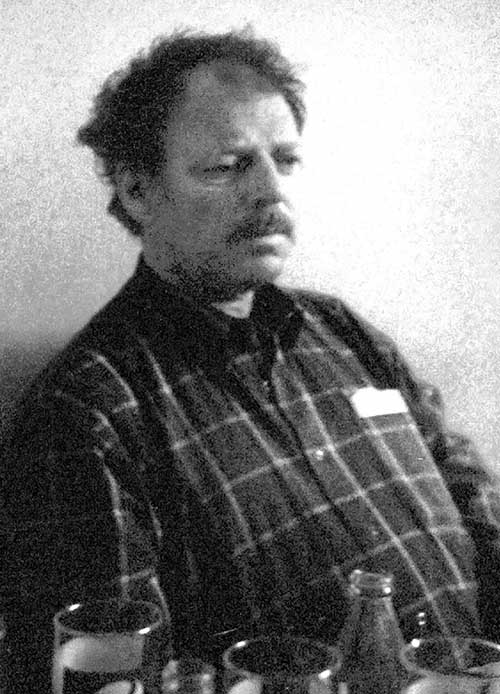
Jurij Moskvitin in a thoughtful moment in 1996, "This is how I want to be remembered after my death."

In this book, Moskvitin records a collection of his theories on the beginnings of thought and language. In his view, the origin of language and thought lie in spontaneous and rare creative acts, often inspired in a human in a stressful and dangerous situation.

These thoughts are inspired by a period in which the author turned his attention "from 'what he thinks' to 'how he thinks'", a turn to introspection. Moskvitin describes how he came to observe "states of mind when consciousness is kept somewhere halfway between the waking state and dream." Moskvitin became aware of strange "sparks" and "smoke-like forms", which "upon close and intense observation became the elements of waking dreams, forming persons, landscapes, strange mathematical fractal forms." Moskvitin came to believe that the hypnagogic patterns he was observing were the actual `material' out of which the conscious mind `builds' its representation of the external world. Our inner world of dreams and visions comes before the outer one of sensory stimuli (Closed-eye hallucination).

For Moskvitin, this inner world of sequential impressions we observe as our experience. Aggregates of lower-level forms creates concepts and higher-level ideas. In his view, humans have a tendency to relate their experience to the already known, dealing with situations in the world with methods and ideas created prior. It is only when this tendency to the familiar is reversed, or the use of it is nullified, such as in a dangerous situation, does a creative act emerge. The totality of those prior ideas and concepts (the totality of memes) he labels the 'anthroposphere'. For Moskvitin, the origin and development of this anthroposphere is in the multi-thousand year accumulation of rare and fortunate creative acts by individuals put in demanding situations.

Analyzing the creative act itself, Moskvitin postulates the existence of a 'projection mechanism' in humans - a mechanism which combines a few sustained impressions into a new aggregate, an idea. Building on what is essentially the stream model of consciousness, the mechanism depends on memory to store sequentially occurring impressions and the combinatorial projecting mechanism which provides the creating actor with the "vision" of the new idea from the lower-level forms mentioned above.

Jurij speculates about schizophrenia as an inability to distinguish between lower-level, interior forms and the exterior. He further postulates that the act of creation might involve a temporary state of schizophrenia. There are also further explorations of the topics of mysticism, occultism, and mathematics.

=== It's Exciting to Think (1976) ===
Original title "Det er spændende at tænke". This book was made by Moskvitin in an effort to kick start a child's imagination. It contains classical examples in philosophy and logic and features illustrations by Jakob Hoffmeyer. It was published by Sommer og Sørensen.

=== The Great Wonder (1992) ===
Original title "Den store undren". This book takes up the philosophical questions: What is time? who am I? What is real? Why does anything exist at all? and presents them for the adult reader while guiding the reader through the history of philosophy. The book was published by Lindhart og Ringhof in 1992. Shortly thereafter Moskvitin wrote a highly critical and devastating review of his book in the Danish newspaper Politiken under a pen name. The aim was to create debate and interest in the book, but Moskvitin's plan backfired and the result was a low sale.

=== Simon Spies. The Story of a Friendship (1984, 1999) ===
Original title "Simon Spies. Historien om et venskab". This book was published twice. Immediately after Spies's death on 16 April 1984, Moskivitin began writing the book which he managed to publish within the same year under the title "Simon Spies – en myte" (Simon Spies - a myth). The book received a critical reception in that it painted an honest, but non-glamorous portrait of the Danish tycoon. The book concerns itself with the psychedelic era of Simon Spies's life during the late 60's in which Moskvitin and Spies were close friends. Years later Moskivitin decided to edit out some of the more obscene details while making the book more readable. This "final version" called "Historien om et venskab" was published in 1999 by Lindhardt og Ringhof.

=== The Deaf Lizard (2001) ===
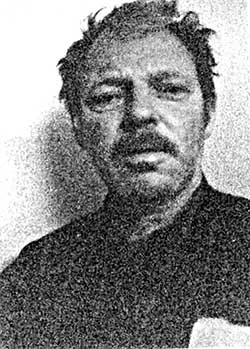
Image from the same photo session in 1996 as above

Original title "Den døve øgle". Moskvitin wrote this self-portrait as the first of two books, the second of which was never published. It contains the story of Moskvitin's childhood and youth. Moskvitin notably describes how he became friends with Karen Blixen, how he had his first sexual intercourse in Paris, his first great concert in Cairo, and his mother's aristocratic friends. The book follows Moskvitin in his never ending search for women, drugs and spiritual insight. The book was published in 2001 by Lindhardt og Ringhof.

=== Thou Shalt Not Waste Thy Life (2008) ===
Original title "Du må ikke sjuske med dit liv". Shortly after the death of Henrik Stangerup in 1998, Jurij Moskvitin started writing Stangerup's biography. It was completed in the spring of 1999. It was due to be released later that year by the publisher Lindhardt & Ringhof, though the latter canceled the publication in the last moment due to concerns about Henrik's posthumous reputation. Only after the journalist Poul Pilgaard, having heard about the manuscript while interviewing pianist Ilja Bergh, tracked down a person possessing a copy, was the book published by Pilgaard's own publishing house Bianco Luno. The publication date was 28 August 2008, three years after Jurij Moskvitin's death.

== See also ==
- Karen Blixen
- Simon Spies
- Tao Nørager
- Ove von Spaeth
- Philosophy of mind
