= Warming =

Warming may refer to:

== People ==
- Eugenius Warming, (1841–1924), Danish botanist
- Thomas Warming, (b. 1969), Danish illustrator, painter and author

== See also ==
- Global warming
- Warming up
- Warming Land
- Warming stripes, a data visualization technique for global warming
