= Nissen =

Nissen may refer to:

- Nissen (surname)
- Saint Nissen, a 5th century Irish abbot
- a creature in Norse mythology, see Tomte
- a Nissen hut, a building shaped like a tube cut in half along the middle and made from corrugated iron sheets
- the Nissen Building in Winston-Salem, North Carolina
- Nissen fundoplication, a surgical procedure to treat gastroesophageal reflux disease and hiatal hernia
