= September 6 (Eastern Orthodox liturgics) =

Day in the Eastern Orthodox liturgical calendar

Eastern Orthodox liturgical calendar
September 5	September 6	September 7
September 6 O.S. ≍ September 19 N.S. September 6 N.S ≍ August 24 O.S.

An Eastern Orthodox cross

September 6 in Eastern Orthodox liturgical calendars is a feast day and a day of commemoration of saints and martyrs. Although some Orthodox churches use the Revised Julian Calendar and others use the traditional Julian calendar, the fixed commemorations for their respective September 6 are broadly the same, no matter which calendar is used. (Note: Despite the dates being the same, the days to which they refer typically differ by 13 days. The notation Old Style or O.S. is sometimes used to indicate a date in the traditional Julian Calendar (the "Old Calendar"). The notation New Style or N.S. indicates a date in the Revised Julian calendar (the "New Calendar").)

== Saints ==
- Martyrs Romulus and 11,000 others, in Armenia (c. 107-115)
- Martyrs Cyriacus, Faustus, Abibus, and 11 others, at Alexandria (250) (Note: The references in the Greek Synaxarion are as follows: Martyr Cyriacus the Novice.; Martyr Faustus.; Martyrs Macarius and Andreas.; Martyr Abibus.) (Note: "At Alexandria, the holy martyrs Faustus, priest, Macarius, and ten companions, who received the martyr's crown by being beheaded for the name of Christ, in the time of the emperor Decius and the governor Valerius.")
- Martyrs Calodote, Macarius, Andrew, Cyriacus, Dionysius, Andrew the Soldier, Andropelagia, Thecla, Theoctistus, and Sarapabon the Senator, in Egypt (256)
- Hieromartyr Cyril, Bishop of Gortyna on Crete (c. 303) (see also: June 14, July 9)
- Martyr Eudoxius, and with him Martyrs Zeno, Macarius, and 1,104 soldiers, in Melitene (311-312)
- Saint Archippus of Hierapolis (4th century)
- Saint David of Hermopolis in Egypt (6th century)

== Pre-Schism Western saints ==
- Saints Augustine, Sanctian and Beata, born in Spain, martyred near Sens in France, where they were venerated (273)
- Saint Petronius, Bishop of Verona and Confessor (c. 450)
- Saint Arator, fourth Bishop of Verdun in France (c. 460)
- Saint Maccallin (Macallan, Macculin Dus), Bishop of Lusk in Ireland, also venerated in Scotland (c. 497)
- Saints Donatian, Praesidius, Mansuetus, Germanus, Fusculus and Laetus, driven out of Africa into exile by Huneric the Arian King of the Vandals (5th century) (Note: "In Africa, in the persecution of the Vandals, the holy bishops Donatian, Praesidius, Mansuetus, Germanus, and Fusculus, who were most cruelly scourged and sent into exile, by order of the Arian king Hunneric, because they proclaimed the Catholic truth. Among them was one named Laetus, also a bishop, a courageous and most learned man, who was burned alive after a long imprisonment in a loathsome dungeon.")
- Saint Eleutherius, Abbot of St Mark's Abbey in Spoleto, then a monk at San Gregorio Magno al Celio in Rome (c. 590) (Note: He is mentioned several times by St Gregory the Great as a wonderworker. He was Abbot of St Mark's in Spoleto in Italy, which he left for St Gregory's own monastery in Rome, where he lived as a monk for many years.) (Note: "At Rome, the holy abbot Eleutherius, a servant of God, who, according to the testimony of Pope St. Gregory, raised a dead man to life by his prayers and tears.")
- Saint Faustus, Abbot of the monastery of Santa Lucy in Syracuse in Sicily (c. 607) (Note: His disciple was Zosimus, the future Bishop of Syracuse.)
- Saint Cagnoald (Chainoaldus, Cagnou), brother of St Faro and St Burgundofara, he became a monk at Luxeuil Abbey in France, and later the sixth Bishop of Laon (c. 635)
- Saint Beya (Bega, Begh, Bee), Virgin, first Abbess of Copeland in Cumbria (7th century) (Note: A holy virgin from Ireland who founded a convent at what is now St Bees Head in Cumberland. The village of Kilbees in Scotland was also named after her.)
- Saints Felix and Augebert, missionaries killed by pagans in Champagne (7th century) (Note: Two slaves from England sold in France and ransomed by St Gregory the Great, who asked that they be taken to a monastery to be prepared as missionaries in England. Felix was ordained priest and Augebert deacon, but they were killed by pagans in Champagne before they could undertake their mission.)
- Saint Magnus of Füssen (Magnoaldus, Maginold, Mang), Enlightener of the Allgäu region of Germany (750-772) (Note: Born in Ireland, he preached with Sts Columbanus and Gall. He founded the Monastery of Füssen in Bavaria in Germany.)

== Post-Schism Orthodox saints ==
=== New martyrs and confessors ===
- New Hieromartyr Maximus Sandovich, Priest, of Lemkovina, in the Carpathian Mountains (1914) (Note: He was executed on Sunday, August 6th, 1914. He is commemorated on: August 6 / July 24 (date of martyrdom); September 6 / August 24 (glorification - feast day); "Synaxis of the Saints of Galicia": (in Russian) Собор Галицких святых, celebrated in the Third Week of Pentecost.)
- New Hieromartyr Demetrius Spassky, Priest (1918)
- New Hieromartyrs John Pavlovsky and Vsevolod Poteminsky, Priests (1937)
- New Hieromartyr Constantine Bogoslovsky, Priest (1937)

== Other commemorations ==
- Commemoration of the Miracle of the Archangel Michael at Colossae (Chonae) (4th century)
- Synaxis of the Archangel Michael at Nimborio (the commercial port) of Symi island, Greece. (Note: The chapel of the Archangel Michael is situated at the head of the port of Symi.)
- Synaxis of the Archangel Michael of Perimpliotis, on Symi island, Greece. (Note: The chapel of the Archangel Michael is located at "Oxo Xisos" («Όξω Ξίσος») in Symi.)
- Second Consecration of the Church of the Theotokos "in the home of St. Irene (or of St. Anne)". (Note: The meaning of the Greek is unclear and no further details are given in the Synaxarion: (in Greek) :Ἐγκαίνια Ναοῦ Ὑπεραγίας Θεοτόκου εἰς τὸ Δεύτερον ἐν τῷ οἴκῳ τῆς Ἁγίας Εἰρήνης (κατ’ ἄλλους Ἁγίας Ἄννης)".)
- Icon of the Theotokos of Kiev-Bratsk (1654) (see also: May 10)
- Icon of the Theotokos Arapet (Arabian). (Note: See: (in Russian) Арапетская икона Божией Матери. Википедии. (Russian Wikipedia).)
- Repose of Ivan Yakovlevich Koreisha, Fool-for-Christ, of Moscow (1861)
- Repose of Archimandrite Paisius the New of Mount Athos (1871)

== Icon gallery ==
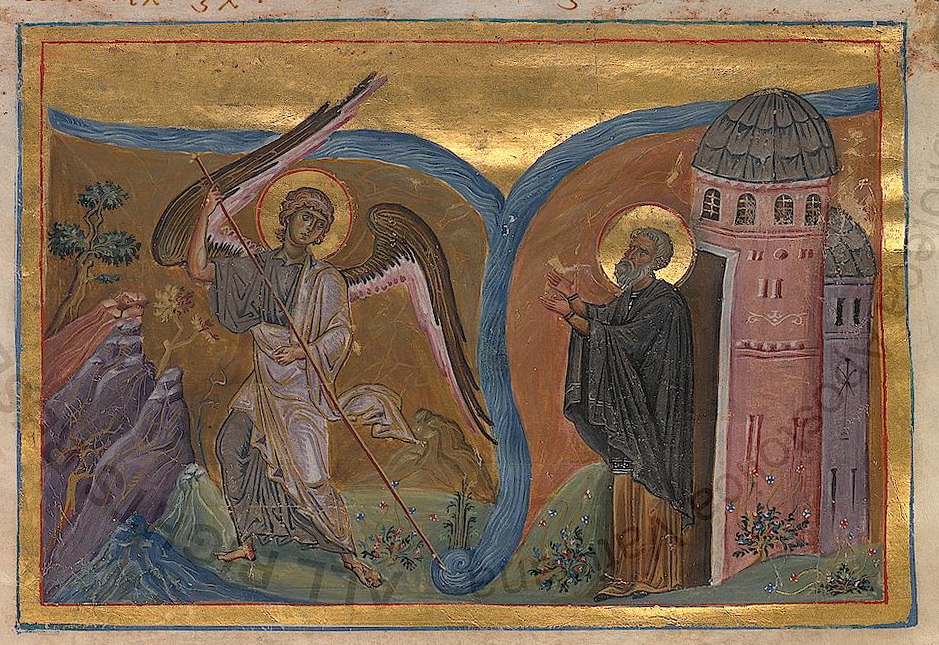
Miracle of the Archangel Michael at Colossae (Chonae).
(Menologion of Basil II, 10th century).

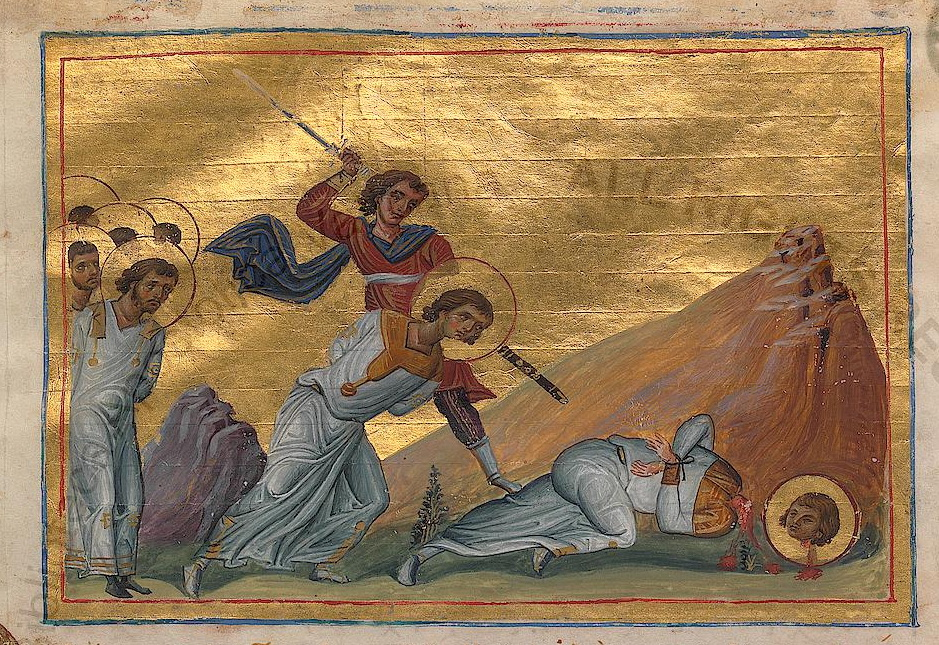
Martyrs Romulus, and Eudoxius, and 1,104 soldiers, in Melitene.
(Menologion of Basil II, 10th century).

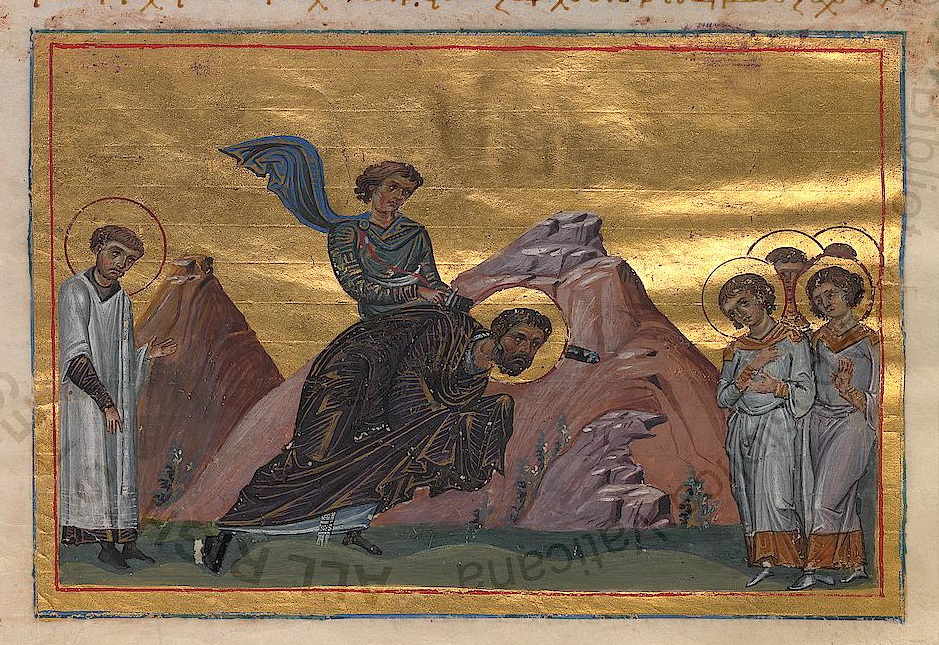
Faustus the Presbyter, Abibas the Deacon, Cyriacus and 11 other martyrs.
(Menologion of Basil II, 10th century).

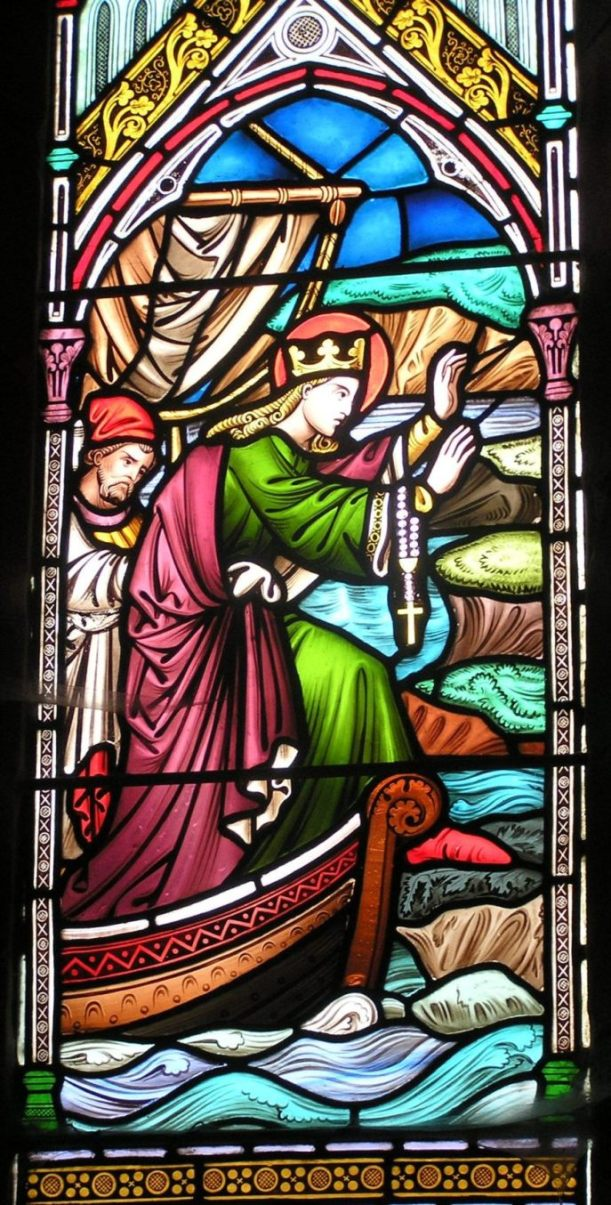
St. Bega, Virgin, first Abbess of Copeland in Cumbria.

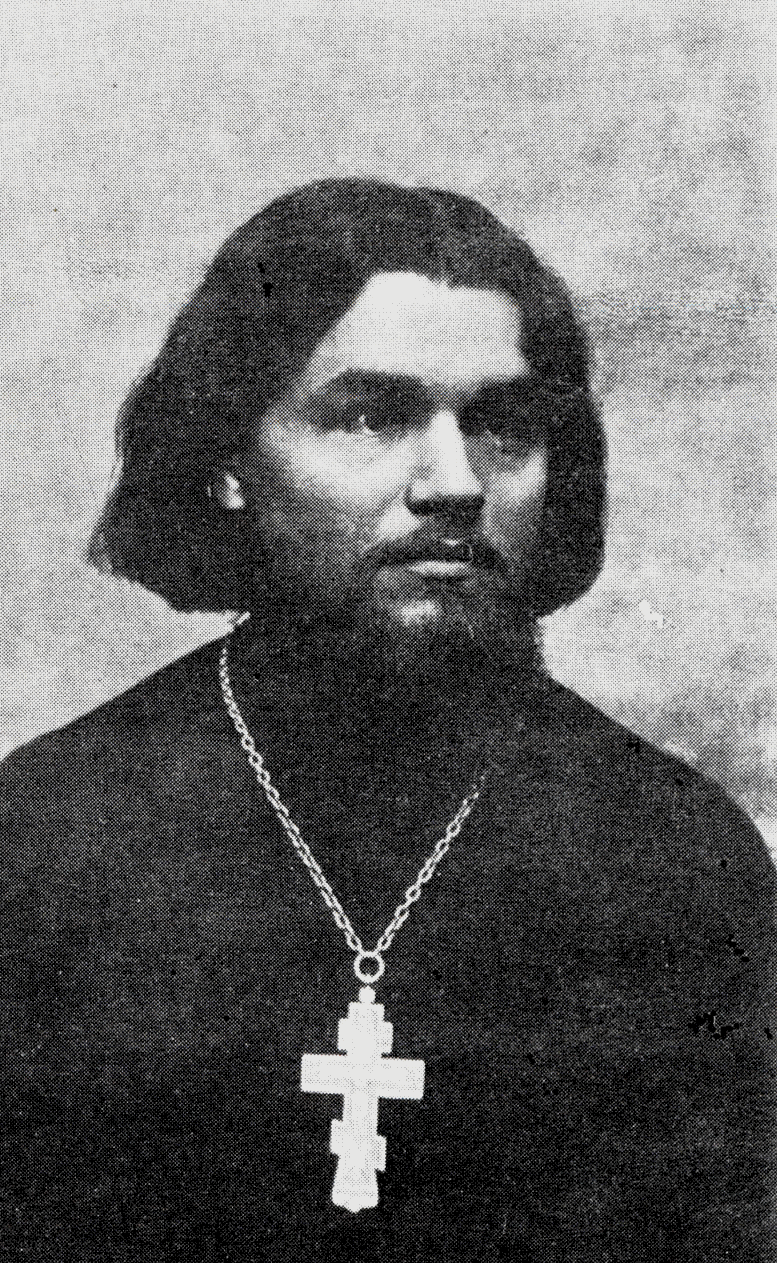
New Hieromartyr Maxim Sandovich, Priest, of Lemkovina.

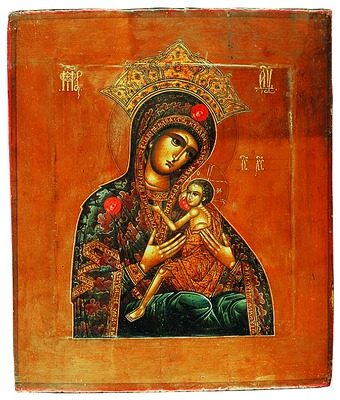
Icon of the Theotokos Arapet (Arapetskaya, Arabian).

== Sources ==
- September 6/September 19. Orthodox Calendar (PRAVOSLAVIE.RU).
- September 19 / September 6. HOLY TRINITY RUSSIAN ORTHODOX CHURCH (A parish of the Patriarchate of Moscow).
- September 6. OCA - The Lives of the Saints.
- The Autonomous Orthodox Metropolia of Western Europe and the Americas (ROCOR). St. Hilarion Calendar of Saints for the year of our Lord 2004. St. Hilarion Press (Austin, TX). p. 66.
- The Sixth Day of the Month of September. Orthodoxy in China.
- September 6. Latin Saints of the Orthodox Patriarchate of Rome.
- The Roman Martyrology. Transl. by the Archbishop of Baltimore. Last Edition, According to the Copy Printed at Rome in 1914. Revised Edition, with the Imprimatur of His Eminence Cardinal Gibbons. Baltimore: John Murphy Company, 1916. pp. 273–274.
- Rev. Richard Stanton. A Menology of England and Wales, or, Brief Memorials of the Ancient British and English Saints Arranged According to the Calendar, Together with the Martyrs of the 16th and 17th Centuries. London: Burns & Oates, 1892. pp. 436–437.

Greek Sources

- Great Synaxaristes: (in Greek) 6 ΣΕΠΤΕΜΒΡΙΟΥ. ΜΕΓΑΣ ΣΥΝΑΞΑΡΙΣΤΗΣ.
- (in Greek) Συναξαριστής. 6 Σεπτεμβρίου. ECCLESIA.GR. (H ΕΚΚΛΗΣΙΑ ΤΗΣ ΕΛΛΑΔΟΣ).
- (in Greek) 06/09/2026. Ορθόδοξος Συναξαριστής.

Russian Sources

- (in Russian) 19 сентября (6 сентября). Православная Энциклопедия под редакцией Патриарха Московского и всея Руси Кирилла (электронная версия). (Orthodox Encyclopedia - Pravenc.ru).
- (in Russian) 6 сентября по старому стилю / 19 сентября по новому стилю. Русская Православная Церковь - Православный церковный календарь на 2026 год.
