= August 24 (Eastern Orthodox liturgics) =

Day in the Eastern Orthodox liturgical calendar

Eastern Orthodox liturgical calendar
August 23	August 24	August 25
August 24 O.S. ≍ September 6 N.S. August 24 N.S ≍ August 11 O.S.

An Eastern Orthodox cross

August 24 in Eastern Orthodox liturgical calendars is a feast day and a day of commemoration of saints and martyrs. Although some Orthodox churches use the Revised Julian Calendar and others use the traditional Julian calendar, the fixed commemorations for their respective August 24 are broadly the same, no matter which calendar is used. (Note: Despite the dates being the same, the days to which they refer typically differ by 13 days. The notation Old Style or O.S. is sometimes used to indicate a date in the traditional Julian Calendar (the "Old Calendar"). The notation New Style or N.S. indicates a date in the Revised Julian calendar (the "New Calendar").)

== Saints ==
- Hieromartyr Eutychius (1st century), disciple of St. John the Theologian. (Note: "The same day, St. Eutychius, disciple of the blessed Evangelist John. He preached the Gospel in many countries, was subjected to imprisonment, to stripes and fire, and finally he rested in peace.")
- Martyr Tation, at Claudiopolis (Bithynia) (305) (Note: "In Isauria, St. Tatio, martyr, who received the crown of martyrdom by being beheaded in the persecution of Domitian, under the governor Urbanus.")
- Virginmartyr Kyra (Cira, Cira, Shirin) Persia (558)
- Saint George Limniotes the Confessor, of Mount Olympus in Bithynia (716) (Note: Saint George Limniotes lived during the seventh and eighth centuries and was a monk of the Olympian monastery near Constantinople. He suffered for venerating icons under the Iconoclast emperor Leo the Isaurian (716-741). They burned his head and cut off his nose. St George died in the year 718.) (Note: "Also, St. George Limniota, monk. Because he reprehended the impious emperor Leo for breaking holy images and burning the relics of the saints, he had his hands cut off and his head burned by order of the tyrant, and went to our Lord to receive the recompense of a martyr.")

== Pre-Schism Western saints ==
- Saint Ptolemy (Ptolemaeus), by tradition a disciple of the Apostle Peter, he became Bishop of Nepi in Tuscany in Italy, where he was martyred (1st century) (Note: "At Nepi, St. Ptolemy, bishop, disciple of the blessed apostle Peter. Being sent by him to preach the Gospel in Tuscany, he died a glorious martyr of Christ in the city of Nepi.")
- Saint Romanus of Nepi, a Bishop and martyr of Nepi in Tuscany, Italy, by tradition a disciple of St Ptolemy (1st century) (Note: "In the same place, St. Romanus, bishop of that city, who was the disciple of St. Ptolemy, and his companion in martyrdom.")
- Saint Aurea of Ostia, an early martyr in Ostia in Italy (c. 270) (Note: "At Ostia, St. Aurea, virgin and martyr, who was plunged into the sea with a stone tied to her neck. Her body, being cast on the shore, was buried by blessed Nounus.")
- Saint Patrick, a bishop in Ireland, surnamed Patrick the Elder, whose relics were later enshrined at Glastonbury in England (c. 450) (Note: In 457 "the elder Patrick" (Irish: Patraic Sen) is said to have died: this may refer to the death of Palladius, who is said in the Book of Armagh to have also been called Patrick.) (Note: "At Nevers, St. Patrick, abbot.")
- Saint Yrchard (Irchard, Yarcard), a priest in Scotland, consecrated bishop by St Ternan to work among the Picts (5th century)
- Saint Ouen (Audöenus, Audoin, Aldwin, Owen, Dado), Archbishop of Rouen, Gaul, Confessor (c. 683) (Note: He founded the monastery of Rebais in France, was consecrated Bishop of Rouen in 641, attending the Council of Châlons in 644 and reposing at what is now a suburb of Paris, named St Ouen after him.)
- Saint Bregwin, Twelfth Archbishop of Canterbury (764)
- Saint Sandratus (Sandradus), Abbot of Gladbach, and in 981 Abbot of Weissenburg (986)

== Post-Schism Orthodox saints ==
- Saint Martyrius, Archbishop of Novgorod (1199)
- Hieromartyr Athanasius II, Patriarch of Jerusalem (1244)
- Venerable Arsenius, founder of Komel Monastery (Vologda), Wonderworker (1550)
- Venerable Serapion the Wonderworker, abbot of the Monastery of St. John the Baptist at David Gareja monastery complex, Georgia (1774)
- New Hieromartyr Cosmas of Aetolia, Equal-to-the-Apostles (1779) (see also: August 4)
- Saint Aristocleus, Elder, of Moscow and Mount Athos (1918)

=== New martyrs and confessors ===
- New Hieromartyr Maxim Sandovich, Priest, of Lemkovina, Poland (1914)
- New Hieromartyr Seraphim (Shakhmut), Archimandrite, of Grodno (Belarus) (1946)

== Other commemorations ==
- Icon of the Most Holy Theotokos "Petrovskaya" ("of St. Peter of Moscow") (ca. 1306)
- Appearance of the Most Holy Theotokos (c. 1385) to St. Sergius of Radonezh (1392)
- Translation of the relics (1479) of St. Peter of Moscow, Metropolitan of Kiev and Moscow (1326)
- Translation of the relics (1716) of St. Dionysios of Zakynthos, Archbishop of Aegina (1624)

== Icon gallery ==
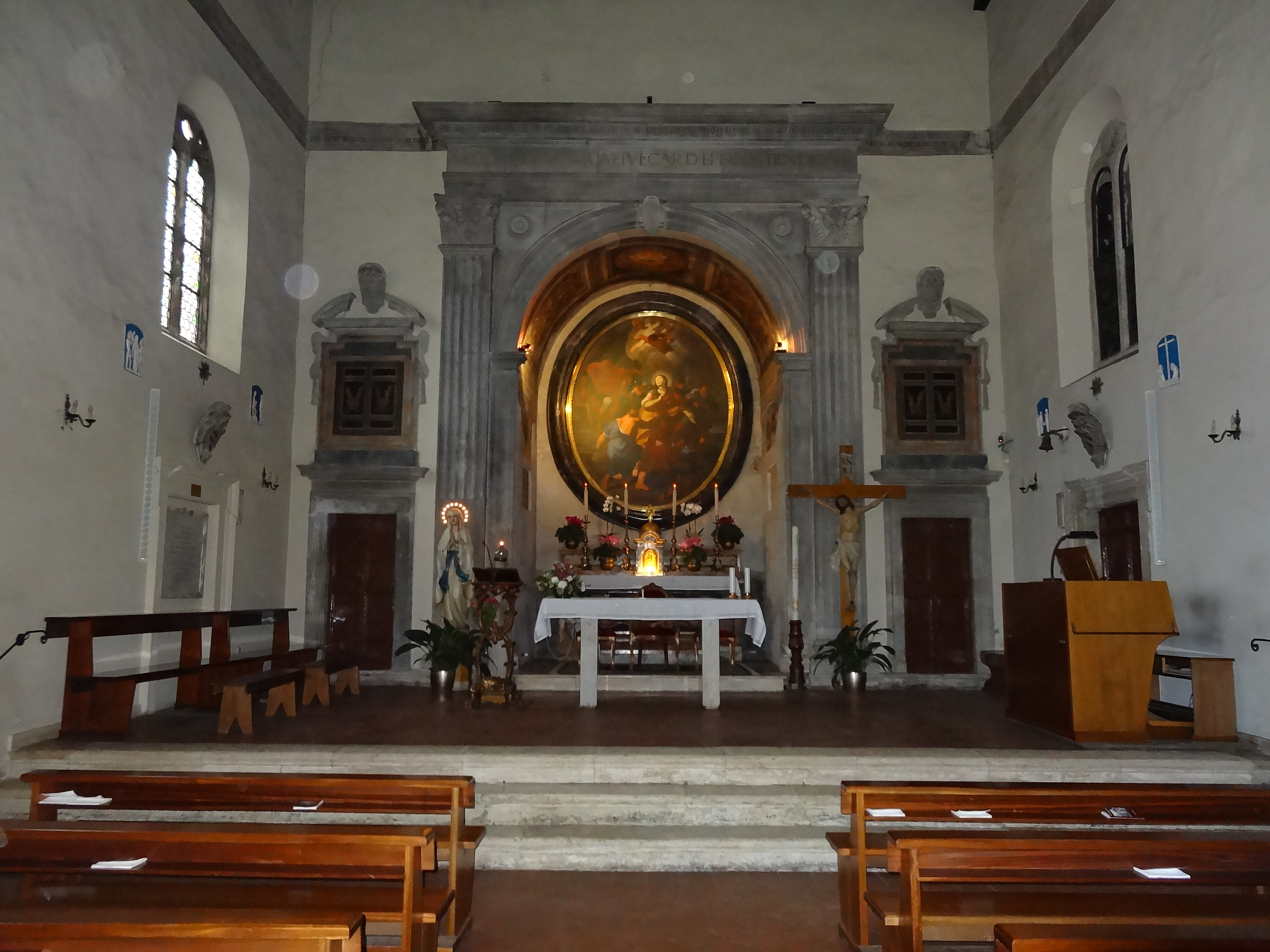
Interior of the Basilica of St. Aurea of Ostia.

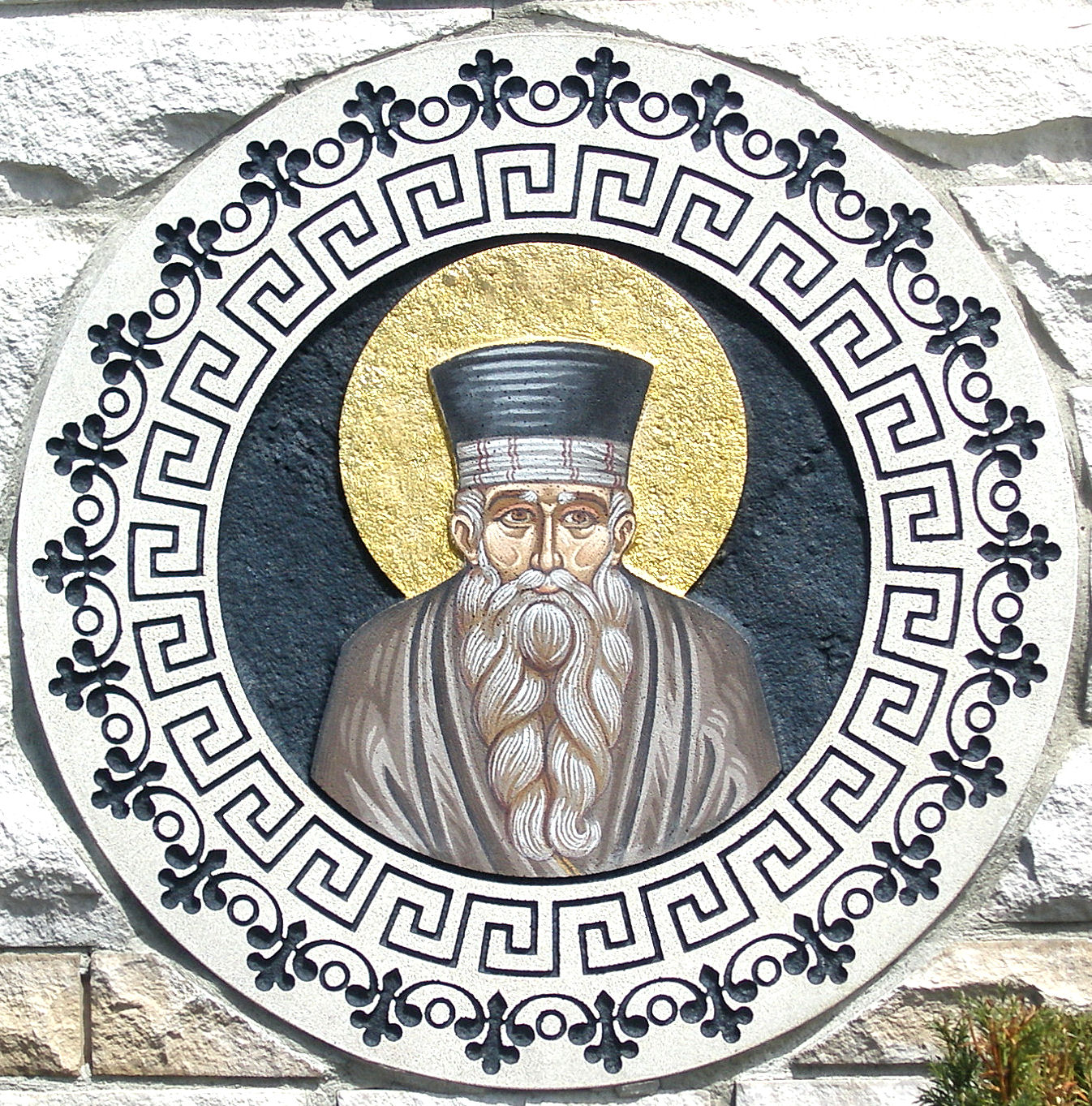
New Hieromartyr Cosmas of Aetolia, Equal-to-the-Apostles.

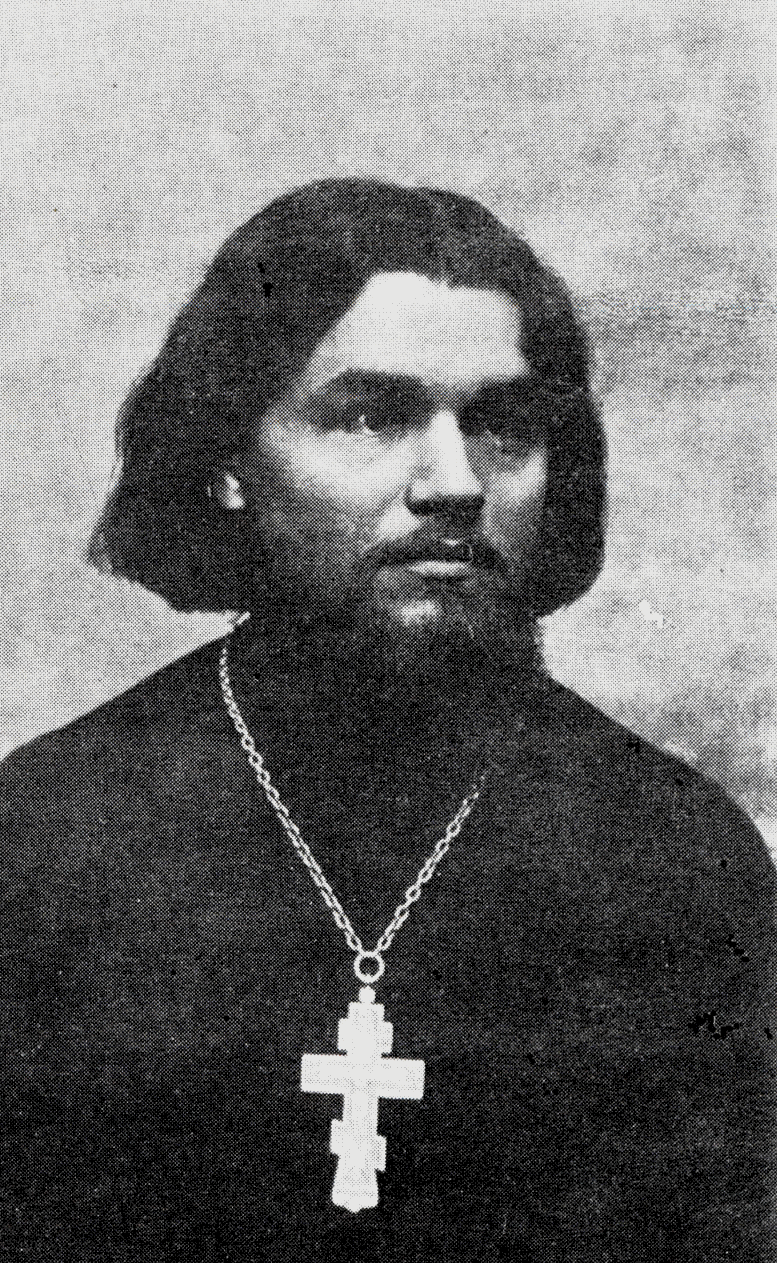
New Hieromartyr Maxim Sandovich, Priest, of Lemkovina.

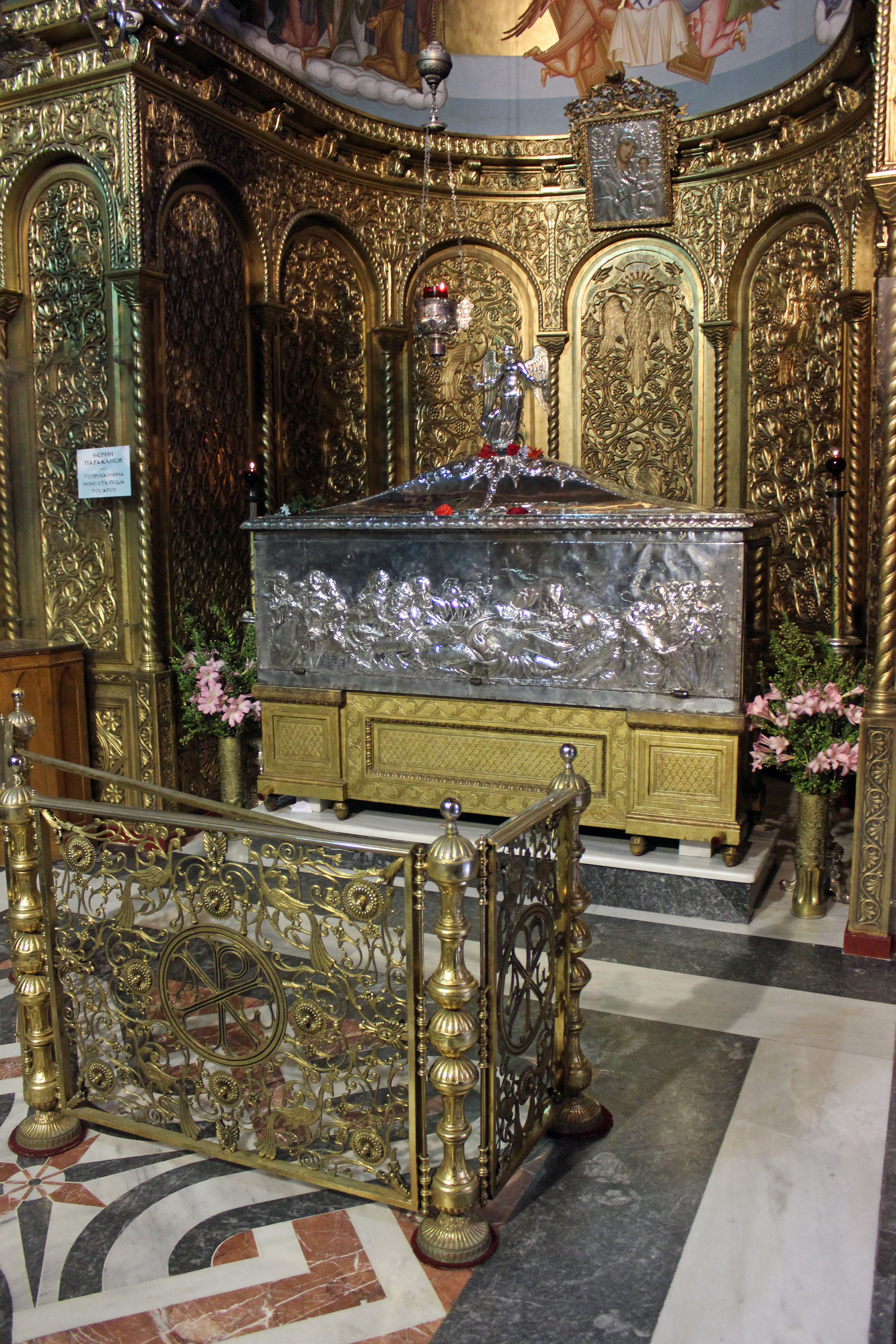
Sarcophagus of Saint Dionysios of Zakynthos.

== Sources ==
- August 24 / September 6. Orthodox Calendar (PRAVOSLAVIE.RU).
- September 6 / August 24. Holy Trinity Russian Orthodox Church (A parish of the Patriarchate of Moscow).
- August 24. OCA - The Lives of the Saints.
- The Autonomous Orthodox Metropolia of Western Europe and the Americas (ROCOR). St. Hilarion Calendar of Saints for the year of our Lord 2004. St. Hilarion Press (Austin, TX). pp. 62-63.
- The Twenty-Fourth Day of the Month of August. Orthodoxy in China.
- August 24. Latin Saints of the Orthodox Patriarchate of Rome.
- The Roman Martyrology. Transl. by the Archbishop of Baltimore. Last Edition, According to the Copy Printed at Rome in 1914. Revised Edition, with the Imprimatur of His Eminence Cardinal Gibbons. Baltimore: John Murphy Company, 1916. pp. 255-256.
- Rev. Richard Stanton. A Menology of England and Wales, or, Brief Memorials of the Ancient British and English Saints Arranged According to the Calendar, Together with the Martyrs of the 16th and 17th Centuries. London: Burns & Oates, 1892. p. 411.

Greek Sources

- Great Synaxaristes: (in Greek) 24 ΑΥΓΟΥΣΤΟΥ. ΜΕΓΑΣ ΣΥΝΑΞΑΡΙΣΤΗΣ.
- (in Greek) Συναξαριστής. 24 Αυγούστου. ECCLESIA.GR. (H ΕΚΚΛΗΣΙΑ ΤΗΣ ΕΛΛΑΔΟΣ).

Russian Sources

- (in Russian) 6 сентября (24 августа). Православная Энциклопедия под редакцией Патриарха Московского и всея Руси Кирилла (электронная версия). (Orthodox Encyclopedia - Pravenc.ru).
