= Tao Nørager =

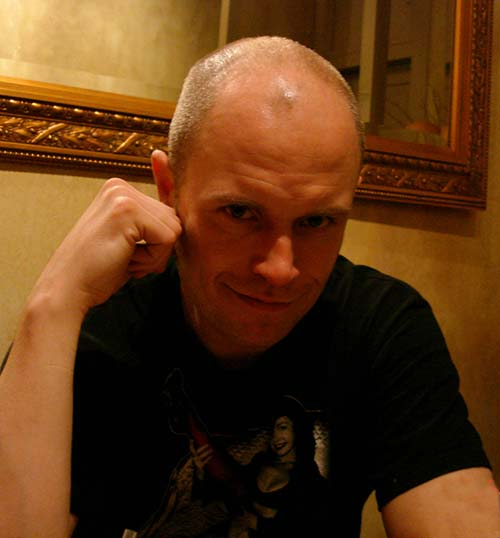
- Danish film director Tao Nørager
- Born: 18 April 1974 (age 51); Copenhagen, Denmark
- Occupation: Film director
- Years active: 2005–present
- Notable work: Bible Black (documentary)

Tao Nørager (born 18 April 1974) is a Danish Film director specializing in documentaries.

Nørager grew up in the Danish town Virum with his mother, a free lance creative director and graphics designer for the advertising industry, and his father CASPER, a record producer for Polydor Records. At a young age he became friends with Jurij Moskvitin.

During his early years Nørager quickly grew a fondness for the graffiti drawing style and participated in the graffiti subculture of Copenhagen during the 80's. The original 80's subcultural style is still present in most of Nørager's works.

After graduating from the Danish Advertisingschool, Nørager continued onto The Short & Documentary Filmschool where he graduated in 2005 with the short film De Personlige.

== Fashion shows ==
After a couple of years working in advertising Nørager became friends with the Welsh fashion designer Andrew Mackenzie. Together with a professional camera crew Nørager directed Mackenzie's Fashion Shows in Milan from 2005 to 2007. The use of an entirely professional camera team using multiple stable camera angles and focusing on the detail in the design, instead of watching the audience and high tempo zoom and tilt, together with a professional film editor resulted in a completely new paradigm for fashion photography.

== De Personlige ==
Nørager directed his first picture De Personlige (The Personals) in 2005. It featured a story about a lonely business man who through a personal ad gets a blind date with what he thinks is a beautiful young woman and her child. During the dinner in the lady's apartment she refers to the picture she sent the man as "a bit dated" further more it turns out her now 30-year-old son also lives in the apartment. The business man regrets his involvement and tries to sneak away, with disastrous consequences.

== Bible Black: Five Days with Andrew Mackenzie (2011) ==
Movie poster for the movie Bible Black

After his involvement with filming the fashion shows, Nørager decided to make a very personal documentary about his friend Andrew Mackenzie, Bible Black (2011) . The documentary features Mackenzie's great comeback to the fashion world after a couple years of obscurity due to legal trouble over the trademark name "Andrew Mackenzie". The documentary follows the increasingly anxious Mackenzie in the last days before a fashion show giving a unique view into the fashion world. As opposed to Nørager's fashion shootings featuring a complete film crew, Nørager chose to be the cameraman himself, in that way ensuring that he did not disturb Mackenzie in his work, and also making sure he could track Mackenzie's every move. The production of the movie happened without any public economic support and was screened as a working copy at the Copenhagen International Documentary Festival where it received a standing applause from the audience and positive reviews by numerous newspapers, Politiken going so far as calling it "A true view into the fashion industry". While the Internet magazine look4fashion.dk praised the camera work and called the movie an expirance for fashion lovers and movie lovers alike

After nearly 2.5 years where the movie was shelved in legal battle, the movie was premiered at the International Film Festival Rotterdam in 2011.

== True Family (2012) ==
Documentary about a traditional New Orleans jazz singer and street performer Meschiya Lake and the life of musicians in post Hurricane Katrina New Orleans. The Movie is described as a performance film about the near-death and vivid rebirth of both its subject, Meschiya, and the city that surrounds her and giving a novel glimpse of a thriving young creative crew.

The movie premiered on 15 October 2012 during the New Orleans film festival.

== Zusa Street (2015) ==
Documentary about Anders Thordal, a street artist suffering from multiple sclerosis who was a famous pioneer in Danish graffiti in the 1980s, his fight for against time, his spirit and humor and his art which consists of large colorful cutout wooden letters spelling ZUSA, an acronym for "Zusammen" meaning together in German.

The movie premiered on 17 January 2015 in "Grand Teatret" in Copenhagen

== See also ==
- Thomas Warming
- Johan Nissen
