= August 6 (Eastern Orthodox liturgics) =

Day in the Eastern Orthodox liturgical calendar

Eastern Orthodox liturgical calendar
August 5	August 6	August 7
August 6 O.S. ≍ August 19 N.S. August 6 N.S ≍ July 24 O.S.

Icon of the Transfiguration of Christ. (Theophanes the Cretan, 16th century).

August 6 in Eastern Orthodox liturgical calendars is a feast day and a day of commemoration of saints and martyrs. Although some Orthodox churches use the Revised Julian Calendar and others use the traditional Julian calendar, the fixed commemorations for their respective August 6 are broadly the same, no matter which calendar is used. (Note: Despite the dates being the same, the days to which they refer typically differ by 13 days. The notation Old Style or O.S. is sometimes used to indicate a date in the traditional Julian Calendar (the "Old Calendar"). The notation New Style or N.S. indicates a date in the Revised Julian calendar (the "New Calendar").)

== Feasts ==
- The Holy Transfiguration of Our Lord, God, and Savior Jesus Christ (Second "Feast of the Savior" in August) (Note: Name days celebrated today include: Sotirios (Σωτήριος); Sotiria (Σωτηρία).) (Note: Blessings of grapes and fruit, which are brought to church to be blessed on this day.)

== Pre-Schism Western saints ==
- Saints Justus and Pastor, two brothers, aged respectively thirteen and nine, scourged and beheaded at Alcalá in Spain under Diocletian (c. 304) (Note: "At Alcala, in Spain, the holy martyrs Justus and Pastor, brothers. While they were yet schoolboys, they threw aside their books in school, and spontaneously ran to martyrdom. By order of the governor Dacian, they were arrested, beaten with rods, and as they exhorted each other to constancy, were led out of the city, and had their throats cut by the executioner.")
- Saint Hormisdas, Pope of Rome and Confessor, author of the Formula of Hormisdas (523) (Note: Born in Frosinone in Latium in Italy, he succeeded St Symmachus as Pope of Rome in 514. He is best remembered for the confession of Faith called the Formula of Hormisdas, which helped end Monophysitism. His son, St Silverius, became Pope of Rome in 536.)
- Saint Hardulf, a hermit at Breedon in Leicestershire in England where the church is dedicated to him (7th century)
- Saint Gezelin (Ghislain, Gisle, Joscelin), a hermit honoured in Slebusrode (Schlebuschrath) near Cologne in Germany.
- Saint Stephen of Cardeña and Companions, Abbot of the Castilian monastery of Cardeña near Burgos in Spain, where there were over two hundred monks, martyred by the Saracens (872) (Note: "At Burgos, in Spain, in the monastery of St. Peter of Cardegna, of the Order of St. Benedict, two hundred monks, with their abbot Stephen, who were put to death for the faith of Christ by the Saracens, and buried in the monastery by the Christians.") (Note: See also:(in Spanish) Monasterio de San Pedro de Cardeña. Wikipedia. (Spanish Wikipedia).)

== Post-Schism Orthodox saints ==
- Saint Theoctistus, Bishop of Chernigov (1123) (see also: August 5)
- New Martyr Abbacum of Thessalonica (1628) (Note: In the Small Euchologion he is commemorated on August 6th. However, since his feast day coincides with the Feast of the Transfiguration, he is commemorated sometimes on August 5th and sometimes on August 7th.)

=== New martyrs and confessors ===
- New Hieromartyr Maxim Sandovich of Lemkovyna, priest, protomartyr of the Lemko people, by the Austro-Hungarians (1914) (Note: He was executed on Sunday, August 6th, 1914. He is also commemorated on: His feast day on September 6 / August 24 (glorification); Also in the Third Week of Pentecost, on the "Synaxis of the Saints of Galicia" ((in Russian) Собор Галицких святых).) (see also July 24 - Old Calendar; and September 6/August 24)
- New Hieromartyr Nicholas Prozorov, Priest (1930) (Note: See also: (in Russian) Прозоров, Николай Фёдорович. Википедии. (Russian Wikipedia).)
- New Hieromartyr Nikolai Zavarin, Priest (1937)
- New Hieromartyr Peter Tokarev, Priest, of Yaroslavl-Rostov (1937)
- New Hieromartyr Dimitry (Lyubimov), Archbishop of Gdov (1938) (Note: See also: (in Russian) Димитрий (Любимов). Википедии. (Russian Wikipedia).)

== Other commemorations ==
- Repose of Hieroschemamonk Nikon the Cave-dweller, of Valaam Monastery (1822)
- Repose of Priest Basil Shoustin, disciple of Optina Elders (1968)
- Repose of Elder Tryphon of Kapsala, Mount Athos (1978)

== Icon gallery ==
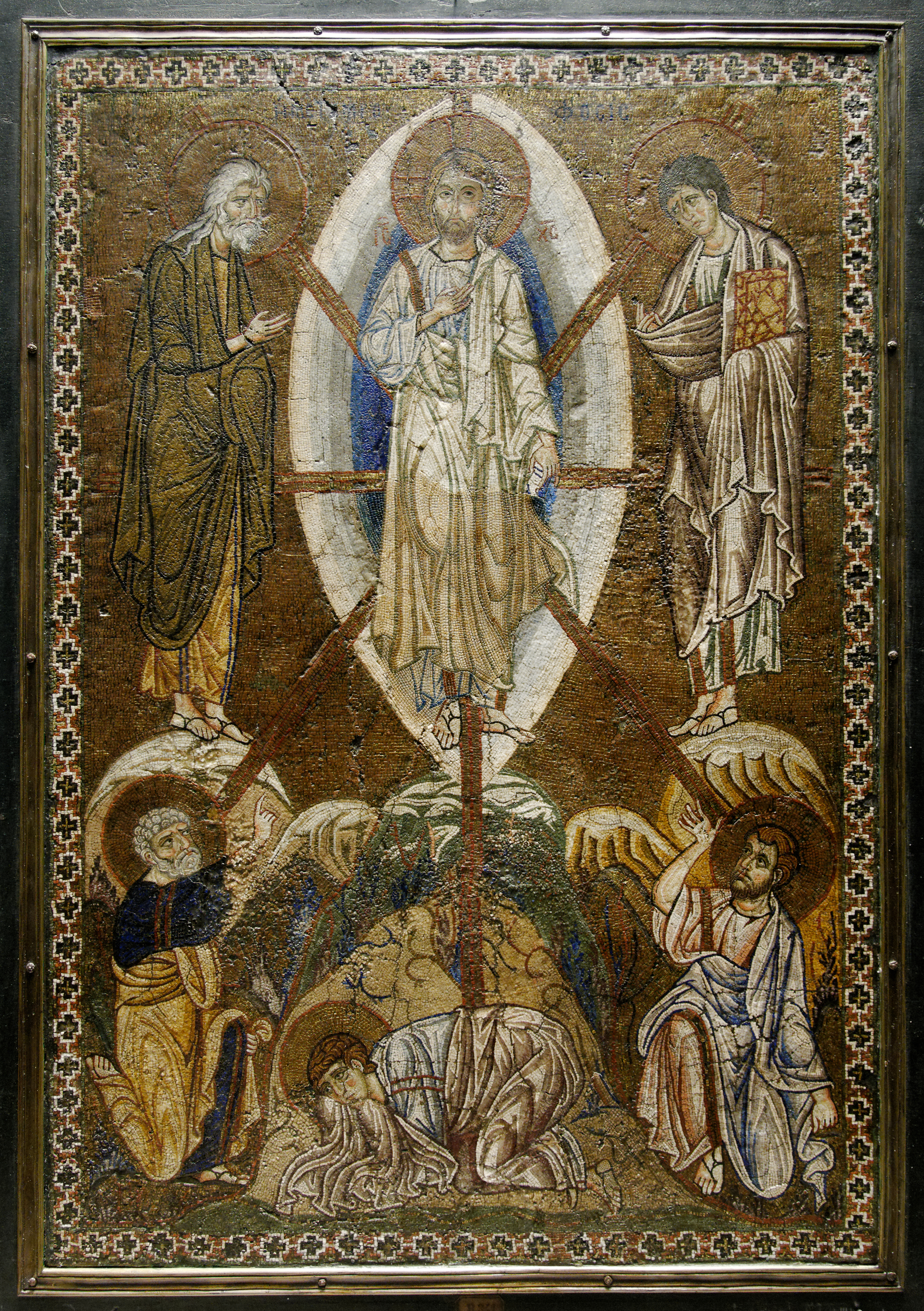
Icon of the Transfiguration of Christ.
(Byzantine artwork, c. 1200).

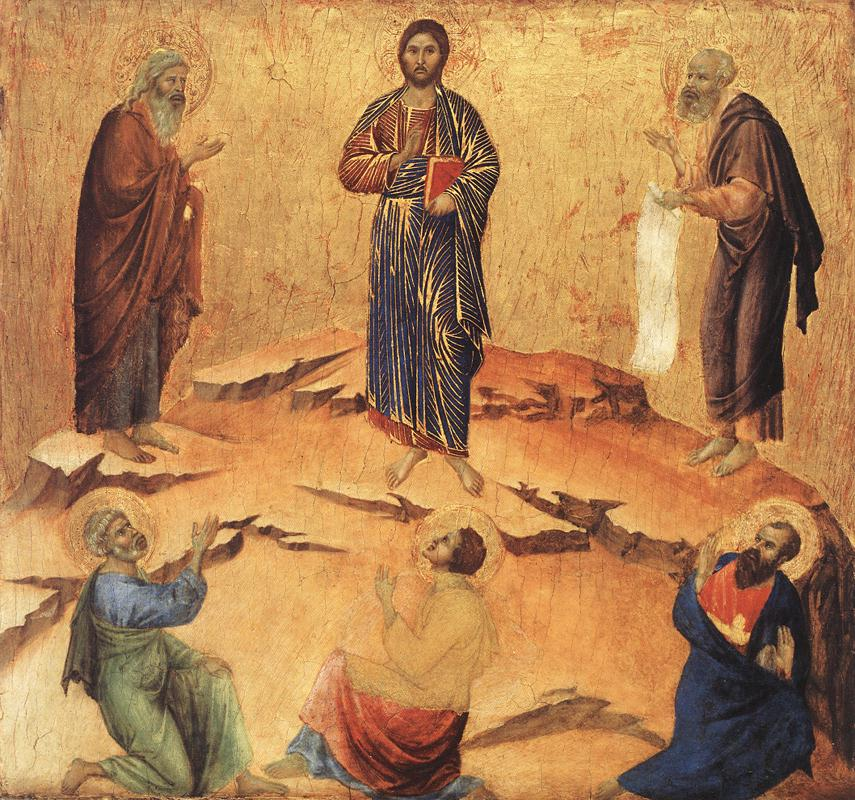
Painting of the Transfiguration of Christ.
(Duccio, c. 1308-1311).

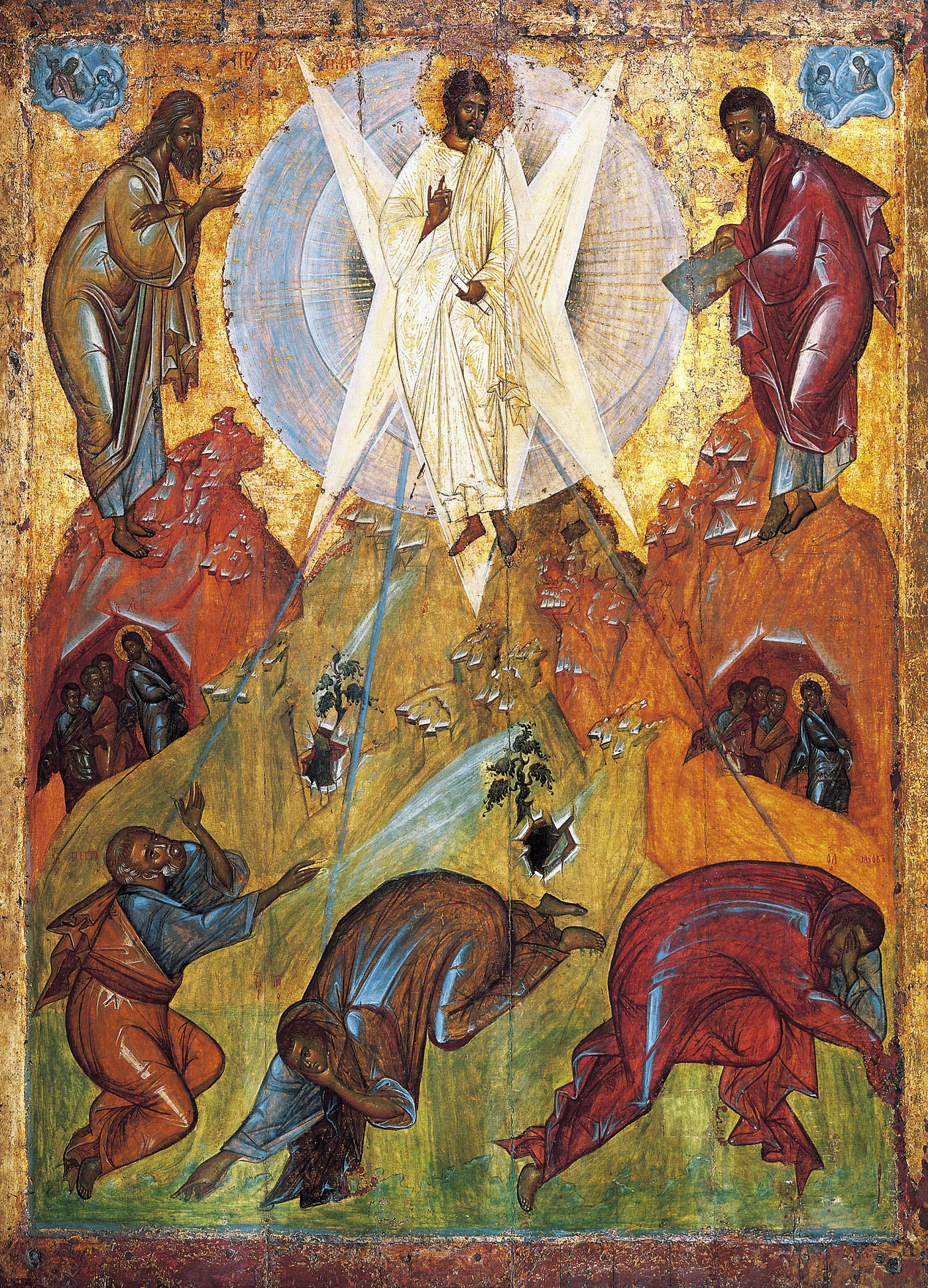
Icon of the Transfiguration of Christ.
(Theophanes the Greek, 15th century).

== Sources ==
- August 6 / August 19. Orthodox Calendar (PRAVOSLAVIE.RU).
- August 19 / August 6. Holy Trinity Russian Orthodox Church (A parish of the Patriarchate of Moscow).
- August 6. OCA - The Lives of the Saints.
- The Autonomous Orthodox Metropolia of Western Europe and the Americas (ROCOR). St. Hilarion Calendar of Saints for the year of our Lord 2004. St. Hilarion Press (Austin, TX). p. 58.
- Menologion: The Sixth Day of the Month of August. Orthodoxy in China.
- August 6. Latin Saints of the Orthodox Patriarchate of Rome.
- The Roman Martyrology. Transl. by the Archbishop of Baltimore. Last Edition, According to the Copy Printed at Rome in 1914. Revised Edition, with the Imprimatur of His Eminence Cardinal Gibbons. Baltimore: John Murphy Company, 1916. p. 234.
- Rev. Richard Stanton. A Menology of England and Wales, or, Brief Memorials of the Ancient British and English Saints Arranged According to the Calendar, Together with the Martyrs of the 16th and 17th Centuries. London: Burns & Oates, 1892. p. 382.

Greek Sources

- Great Synaxaristes: (in Greek) 6 ΑΥΓΟΥΣΤΟΥ. ΜΕΓΑΣ ΣΥΝΑΞΑΡΙΣΤΗΣ.
- (in Greek) Συναξαριστής. 6 Αυγούστου. ECCLESIA.GR. (H ΕΚΚΛΗΣΙΑ ΤΗΣ ΕΛΛΑΔΟΣ).

Russian Sources

- (in Russian) 19 августа (6 августа). Православная Энциклопедия под редакцией Патриарха Московского и всея Руси Кирилла (электронная версия). (Orthodox Encyclopedia - Pravenc.ru).
