= Aristocleus of Athos =

Aristocleus of Athos (Аристоклий, Афонский & Московский) (1838–1918) was a saint and martyr of the Russian Orthodox Church. He is also known as Schema-hieromonk Aristocleus of Mount Athos and Moscow or Aristoklij the Elder.

== Early life ==
Aristoklij the elder was born Alexey Alekseevich Amvrosiev in Orenburg to a pious peasant family. In his early childhood Alexey lost his father.

According to legend he lost a leg after a severe illness at age 10. His mother pleaded with St. Nicholas about healing her son, she vowed to devote Alexei to a monastery if healed. The story continues that on St. Nicholas Feast Day (6 December) Alexei was miraculously healed. When he was seventeen years old, his mother sent him to a monastery. An alternative storey is that he and his mother joined separate monasteries following the death of his Father.

== Career ==
In the year 1876, right after the death of his wife, Alexei Amvrosiev went to Mount Athos and enrolled in St. Agiou Panteleimonos monastery, and on 11 March 1880 he was tonsured with the name Aristoklij, in honour of the martyr Cyprian Aristokliâ Salaminskiy. Four years later, on 2 December 1884, Aristoklij was ordained a Deacon, and on 12 December that year a hieromonk.

From 1891 to 1894 he was sent back to Moscow to be the Abbot of the St. Panteleimon monastery, a daughter establishment of the one in Mount Athos. During this time began to publish books and the magazine "Душеполезный Собеседник", which tells about the life of Russian monks on Mount Athos. Thanks to the publication of this journal Russian monasteries on Mount Athos began to grow with new novices.

In 1894, after a false denunciation he was forced to leave Moscow and return to Mt Athos. But in November 1909, was reappointed Dean of St. Panteleimon monastery in Moscow where he attracted a significant following.

== Attributation ==
He was considered a healer in his time and is reputed to have raised a baby girl from the dead and restored sight to a blind boy. He is, however, best known outside Russia for a prophecy given in 1918 just before his death.

== Veneration ==
Aristocleus as a leading churchman was imprisoned by Bolshevik forces where he died early in the revolution. He is considered a martyr by the Russian Orthodox Church.

His feast days are 26 August and 24 August. He was originally buried in a marble at the monastery but after the revolution all the monastic estates were nationalized and in 1923 was reburied on Danilovskiy cemetery in Moscow.

On 6 September 2004 Aristoklij was declared a Saint, and on 13 November 2004 he was re-interred at St. Danilov monastery in Moscow. And the church of the Holy great martyr Nikita the Town Church of Moscow.
