= Mountgarret =

Mountgarrett Móta Gairéad
- Townland
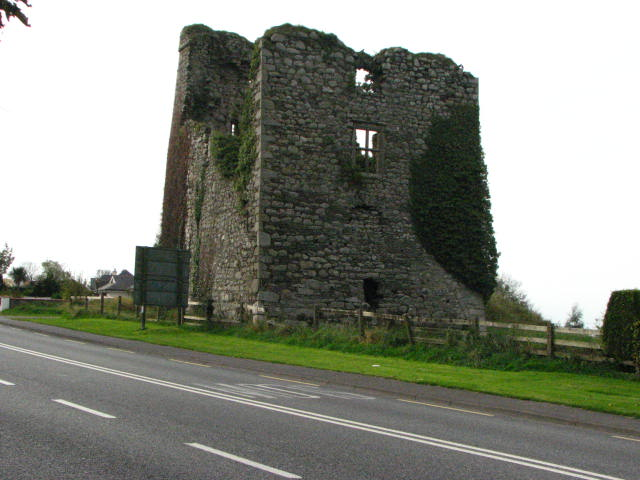
- Mountgarrett Castle

- Location within Ireland
- Coordinates: 52.4101°N 6.9365°W
- Country: Ireland
- County: County Wexford
- Municipality: New Ross

Mountgarret (or Mountgarrett, Mount Garrett; Irish: Móta Gairéad) is a townland in New Ross, County Wexford, Ireland. It is known for the ruins of a medieval tower house that was built by the Bishop of Ferns in 1408.

== Location ==
Mountgarrett is in the electoral division of New Ross Rural. It is within Saint Marys civil parish, and the historical barony of Bantry in County Wexford. Mountgarrett townland has an area of 35.56 hectares (87.9 acres).

It lies along the River Barrow to the west, which forms the boundary between Count Wexford and County Kilkenny. Bordering townlands include: Ardross, Barrettspark, Castlemoyle and Craywell to the south: Knockavilla and MacMurrough to the east; and Mountelliott to the north.

Writing in 1835, Charles Hamilton describes Mountgarrett as "a lofty hill overlooking New Ross" stating that it "is surmounted by the ruins of a castle, from which there is a fine view". In 1841, the population was 71 and the Poor Law valuation was £91 16s. 0d.

== Early monastery ==
Saint Nissen was converted to Christianity by Saint Patrick in the 5th century. He became abbot of Montgarth (Mountgarret) Abbey in Wexford, on the borders of Kilkenny, of which place he is titular saint.

== Medieval tower house ==
Patrick Barrett, Bishop of Ferns, built a tower house at Mountgarret in 1408. On 26 May 1403 King Henry V of England had given Barrett authority "to treat with Irish and English enemies in the counties of Wexford, Kilkenny and Carlow for the purpose of reforming them to peace." In the mid-16th century Sir Richard Butler rebuilt the castle. He was the son of Piers Butler, 8th Earl of Ormond, and in 1550 became the first Lord of Mountgarrett. The castle is the largest Norman tower house in Wexford.

An 1836 illustration in the Dublin Penny Journal shows the castle partially ruined. An 1878 account said the keep of Mountgarrett's castle was still in a tolerable state of preservation. However, the five-storey building was not well-maintained and the south wall and part of the west wall collapsed during the winter of 2009–10. There were other collapses after this. In September 2021, it was reported that a Community Monuments Fund grant of €70,000 had been obtained for stabilizing and preserving the castle. The municipality of New Ross planned to make the castle accessible to tourists. The castle is located at 52.41197°N 6.9351°W on the ring road near the greenway.
