= Ove von Spaeth =

Danish graphic designer and writer

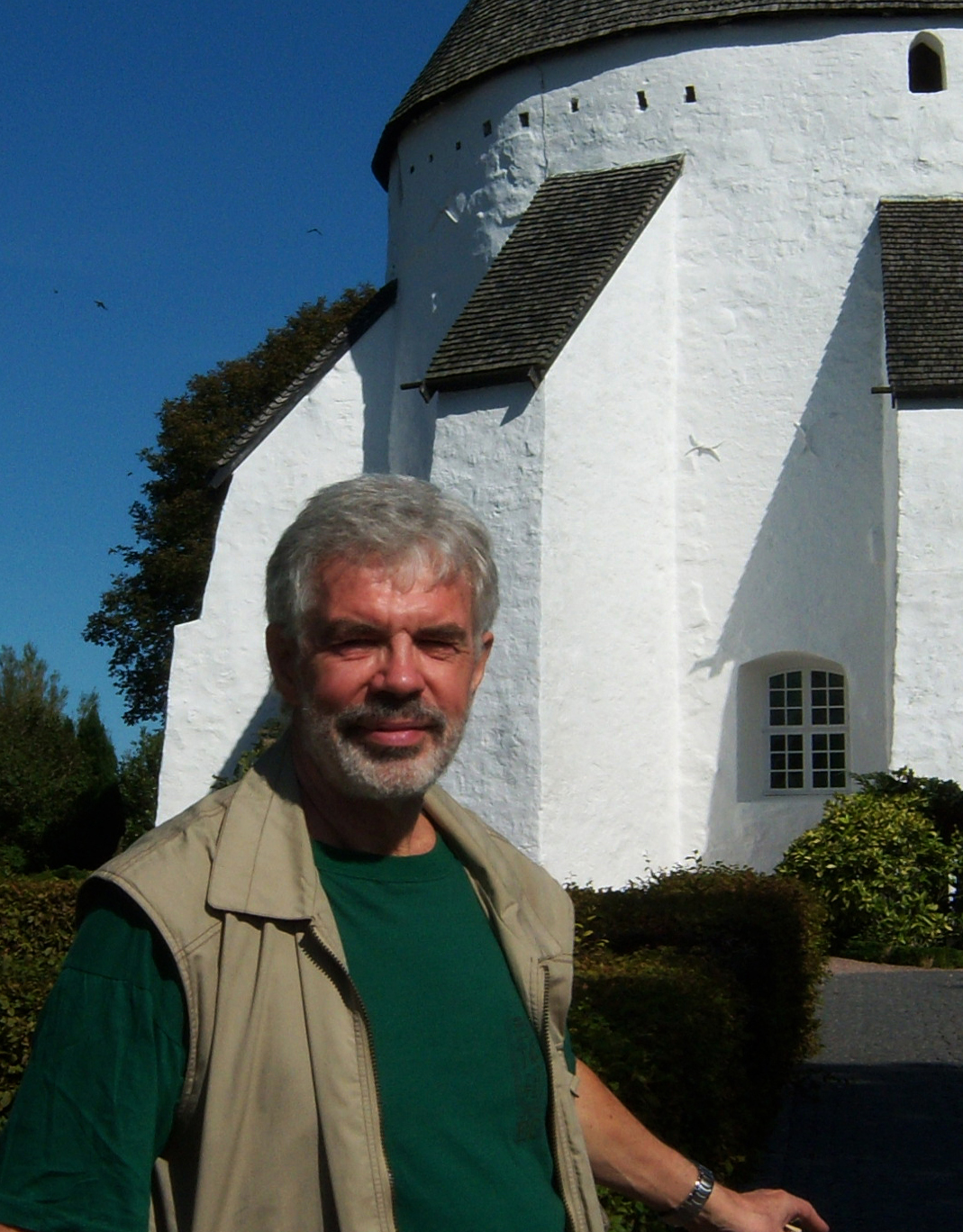
- Ove von Spaeth in front of the historical Oesterlars round church on the Danish island Bornholm
- Born: Christian Ove Wilhelm von Spaeth; 23 February 1938; Copenhagen
- Died: 23 September 2025 (aged 87); Copenhagen, Denmark
- Occupation: Writer
- Writing career
- Language: Danish and English
- Genres: Thriller, Mystery fiction
- Website: www.moses-egypt.net

Christian Ove Wilhelm von Spaeth (23 February 1938 – 23 September 2025) was a Danish graphic designer and writer.

== Life ==
Von Spaeth studied graphic design at The Graphic Arts Institute of Denmark and in the decades following the 1960s became known for his psychedelic poster designs, publications and articles relating to Indian music, art, and spirituality.

In the 1970s, von Spaeth began studying ancient history, religions, and astronomy. His analysis of the earliest known star map in Egypt (the "Senenmut star-map") led to von Spaeth publishing an exact dating of its time and period in Egyptian history and of the reign of Queen Hatshepsut.

== The Moses book series ==
The series of five books on the biblical figure Moses is a semi-fictional work based on ancient textual sources such as the Rabbinical writings, archaeological evidence, and astronomical data. Von Spaeth attempts to develop a historical alternative view of Moses' Egyptian background.

In the first book of the series, The Suppressed Record: Moses' Unknown Egyptian Background (1999), von Spaeth suggests that Moses was an Egyptian prince and heir to the throne who found himself disinherited and forced into exile as a result of complex plots and intrigues at the royal court of Pharaohs Hatshepsut and Thutmose III (approx. 1500 BC). The book had a good reception though it failed to get scientific recognition from the Danish Carsten Niebuhr Institute.

The second book, The Enigmatic Son of Pharaoh’s Daughter: Moses' Identity and Mystery Re-evaluated (2000), suggests that Moses was born to Queen Hatshepsut 3500 years ago, rose to power as a high-ranking leader among the Egyptian elite, was ousted in a coup, along with his mother, and records of his existence were systematically erased. Von Spaeth devotes a significant portion of the book to drawing parallels between Moses and Queen Hatshepsut's chief consul Senenmut. The reception of the second book was very positive, one critic calling it "especially impressive", although others found it scientifically lacking, but excellent as crime fiction.

In the third book, The Vanished Successor: Rediscovering Moses' Hidden War Leading to the Exodus (2001), Moses is an exiled prince who repeatedly tries to regain his claim to the throne of the pharaohs by coordinating a series of strategic uprisings in the margins of the Egyptian empire and a rebellion of Hebrew migrant workers. As the rebellion foils, the workers start seeking their own land and sovereignty.

== Death ==
Von Spaeth died in Copenhagen on 23 September 2025 at the age of 87.

== Select bibliography ==
- Von Spaeth, Ove (2000). "Dating the Oldest Egyptian Star Map". Centaurus. 42 (3): 159–179. Bibcode:2000Cent...42..159V. doi:10.1034/j.1600-0498.2000.420301.x.
