= Thomas Warming =

Danish illustrator, painter, and author

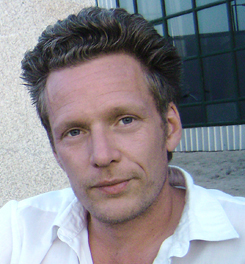
- Born: 20 February 1969 (age 57); Copenhagen, Zealand, Denmark
- Occupations: Writer, Painter, Illustrator
- Writing career
- Years active: 1996–present
- Notable works: The CannonBall King ,Tellus

Thomas Warming (born 20 February 1969) is a Danish illustrator, painter, and author.

== Biography ==
=== Early years ===
Warming, whose parents were both working in the airline industry, lived in Sweden until he was 5.

After relocating back to Denmark, Warming completed elementary school in Kolding, one year as an exchange student at Crater High School in Oregon, followed by one year at Handelsskolen Business School in Denmark.

=== Career ===
From an early age Warming was influenced by Pop art, comic books, graffiti and street art. In 1988, Warming was recruited by an advertising firm in Denmark, earning the title of Art Director at age 25. At the same time, Warming attended fine-art classes at the Spectrum School of the Arts. He majored in painting and live drawing.

Johan Nissen in front of a painting by Warming

In 1993, Warming founded Warming Illustration, moved out of the studio "Den Blå Bil" and joined the artist studio Pinligt Selskab in the heart of Copenhagen. While there, Warming worked for 14 years alongside Valhalla comic book creator Peter Madsen and Teddy H. Kristiansen, as well as fantasy artists Jesper Ejsing and Emil Landgreen.

During this period, Warming produced a range of artistic works including children's books, licensed characters, educational books, advertising, magazines and board games. He also illustrated several computer games, most notably two for the Danish National Space Center and Egemont Publishing in conjunction with the Danish game development company Wegame.

Warming worked with a wide array of companies including Lego, Mattel, Marvel, Microsoft, Suzuki and Cartoon Network. Warming illustrated the worldwide published magazine Entre Nous on AIDS awareness for a year, edited by Jeffrey Lazarus, as well as illustrating articles for the Danish cult magazine Press, edited by Allan Nagel.

As an author and illustrator of children’s books, Thomas Warming debuted in 2003 with Kanonkongen (The Cannonball King), now published in three languages: Danish, Korean and English.

These publications were followed in 2006 by the Sci-Fi trilogy ""Tellus - del 1: Lys I Mørket (Captain Tellus – Part 1: Light In The Dark)"". The first installment is translated into English for the American market by High Before Homeroom author, Maya Sloan (Simon and Schuster Gallery Books 2010). Part 2 in the series is currently in the making and it is entitled ""Tellus - del 2: Magerne (Captain Tellus - part 2 : The Magi).""

In 2008 and 2009 Warming was chosen to represent Denmark at the annual MoCCA Art Festival (Museum of Comics and Cartoon Art) by the Danish Consulate in New York. Warming received a government grant in 2009 by Statens Kunstfond, to participate and exhibit.

Warming has maintained a fine art painting career throughout the last 20 years on the side participating in solo- and group shows and was selected for Diesel New Arts selected jury Scandinavia exhibit in Copenhagen 2005.

Besides Warming's artistic career, he taught sequential art, perspective drawing and acrylic painting at Københavns Tekniske Skole, Kreativ afd. (Copenhagen Technical College, Creative Dpt.), for a consecutive period of 10 years (1998–2008).

== Current work ==
In 2009 Warming received a sponsorship for an Extraordinary Artist Visa and moved to New York City. He is currently working as Lead Concept Designer and Matte Painter for Walsh Family Media on the upcoming CG feature animation film The Cool Beans: We Need a Hit.

Danish film director Tao Nørager is currently making a Documentary about Warming and Patrick Walsh of Walsh Family Media as they are launching the movie

== Works ==
publications by or with illustrations by Thomas Warming

- 1996 The polar bear - By Inga Birna Jonsdottir, Stokrose Publishing.
- 1997 Metallica - By Inga Birna Jonsdottir, Stokrose Publishing.
- 1998 Exhibition - Danish erotica”. By Benthe Clod. Stokrose Publishing.
- 1999 Sprogets lysthus - By Erik Skøtt Andersen. Alinea Publishing.
- 2002 Taran’s første rejse - By Lloyd Alexander. Forum Publishing.
- 2002 Taran og mørkeridderne - By Lloyd Alexander. Forum Publishing.
- 2002 Taran og borgen på øen - By Lloyd Alexander. Forum Publishing.
- 2002 Taran vandringsmand - By Lloyd Alexander. Forum Publishing.
- 2002 Kong Taran - By Lloyd Alexander. Forum Publishing.
- 2003 Kanonkongen –By Thomas Warming. Forum Publishing.
- 2003 Væsner – By Mikkel Starup. Forum Publishing.
- 2006 Tellus - del 1: Lys I Mørket– By Thomas Warming. Peoples Press / Phabel Publishing.
- 2008 Tyvetøs - By Glenn Ringtved, Politikkens Publishing.
- 2008 Inger Svinger fra Heksehuset – By Jim Højberg. Alrune Publishing.
- 2009 The Waymor – By Will Smith1 and Tony Smith. Currently shopped to publishers.

=== Kanonkongen (The CannonBall King) ===
Children's book is for ages 5 and up, hand painted in acrylics, 32 pages and illustrated in full color. The book was nominated Book of the Month by the Copenhagen Public Library

The book was well received by the Danish newspapers calling it "a promising debut with an appeal for children who like action"

=== Tellus - del 1: Lys I Mørket (Captain Tellus – Part 1: Light In The Dark) ===
A cross-genre publication. It is part one of a Science Fiction trilogy for young adults. 64 pages and fully illustrated in acrylics and Photoshop. The book is meant to be a mix between picture book/ graphic novel and comic book. The book was published in Denmark in an untraditional wide format, through Peoples Press Publishing. Part 2 is currently in progress.
