= Dionysios of Zakynthos =

Greek archbishop (c. 1547 – 1622)

Saint Dionysios of Zakynthos
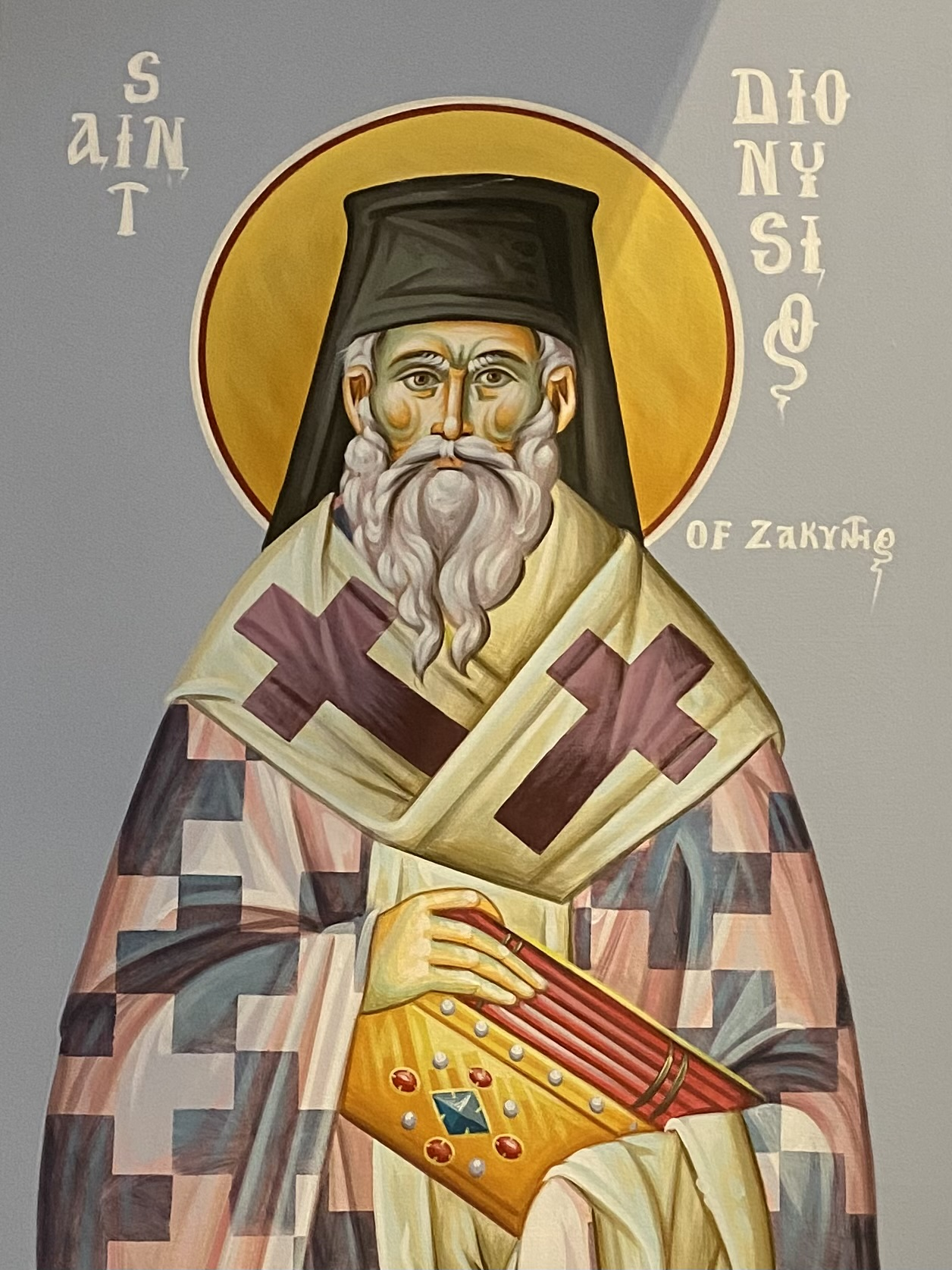
- Icon of Saint Dionysios

Archbishop and Wonderworker of Aegina
- Born: c. 1547
- Died: December 17, 1622
- Venerated in: Eastern Orthodox Church
- Feast: December 17

Saint Dionysios of Zakynthos was a 16th-century Orthodox Christian Bishop of Aegina. He was born on the Greek island of Zakynthos in 1547. He is the patron saint of Zakynthos (sometimes called Zante in English) and is celebrated on August 24 and December 17.

== Biography ==
In his early life, Dionysios joined a monastery a few miles off the coast of Zakynthos. After a while living there, he was encouraged by his fellow monks to be ordained as a priest, which he did. He eventually decided to travel to the Holy Land by way of Athens. After arriving in Athens, he was made Archbishop of Aigina despite personal protests in humility. In about the year 1589, the Patriarch of Constantinople made Archbishop Dionysios the Archbishop of Zakynthos, he stayed in this position until a permanent Archbishop arrived. After this, he returned to his island monastery where he lived out the rest of his life until his death on December 17, 1622.

== Sources ==
- St Dionysios of Zakynthos
