= List of saints named Rufinus =

The Roman Martyrology records 11 saints named Rufinus:

- On 28 February, a Roman martyr, Rufinus, with several companions in martyrdom; nothing is known concerning them.
- On 7 April, an African martyr, Rufinus with two companions; their names are mentioned under 6 April in a list of martyrs in the "Martyrologium Hieronymianum" (ed. De Rossi-Duchesne, 40).
- On 14 June, the two martyrs, Valerius and Rufinus, who suffered at Soissons, during the Diocletian persecution; their names are given under this date in the "Martyrologium Hieronymianum" (ed. De Rossi-Duchesne, 78; cf. 66 under 26 May; also Acta SS., June, II, 796 sqq.).
- On 21 June, Rufinus who suffered martyrdom with Martia at Syracuse; nothing is known concerning him.
- On 30 July, Rufinus of Assisi, who was reportedly the bishop of this city and a martyr. He is probably identical with the "episcopus Marsorum" noted under 11 August. The Acts of the martyrdom of this Rufinus are purely legendary [cf. "Bibliotheca hagiographica latina", II, 1068; Elisei, "Studio sulla chiesa cattedrale di S. Rufino" (Assisi, 1893); D. de Vincentiis, "Notizie di S. Rufino" (Avezzano, 1885)].
- On 19 August, Rufinus, confessor at Mantua.
- On 26 August, a confessor, Rufinus, venerated at Capua (cf. Acta SS., August, V, 819–820); his name is given in the "Martyrologium Hieronymianum" under 26 and 27 August.
- On 4 September, a martyr, Rufinus, with his companions (Silvanus and Vitalicus) in martyrdom who suffered at Ancyra in Galatia; he is also mentioned in company with several others in the "Martyrologium Hieronymianum" (ed. De Rossi-Duchesne, 113) under 31 August, and again under 4 September (ed. De Rossi-Duchesne, 116).
- On 9 September, Rufinus and Rufinianus, with no further particulars.
- On 16 November, Rufinus, a martyr in Africa with several companions in martyrdom; nothing is known concerning this saint.
- Under 22 June the martyr Rufinus of Alexandria is mentioned in the "Martyrologium Hieronymianum" names. (ed. De Rossi-Duchesne, 81).

== Rufinus of Mercia ==
The parish church of Burston, Staffordshire in England is dedicated to St Rufin, also known as Rufinus, second son of Wolferus, pagan king of Mercia in the seventh century. Wolferus was a persecutor of Christians, and on discovering that his sons Wolfadus and Rufinus had been converted to Christianity by St Chad, pursued them. He soon captured Wolfadus at Stone and martyred him there, but Rufinus had escaped further and was hidden in some woods. When he was eventually captured and killed, the place of his martyrdom became the site of an early chapel in the village of Burston. Wolferus was subsequently filled with remorse and converted to Christianity himself, banning pagan worship and raising St Chad to become Bishop of Lichfield.
