= Carolina Nissen =

Chilean singer (born 1976)

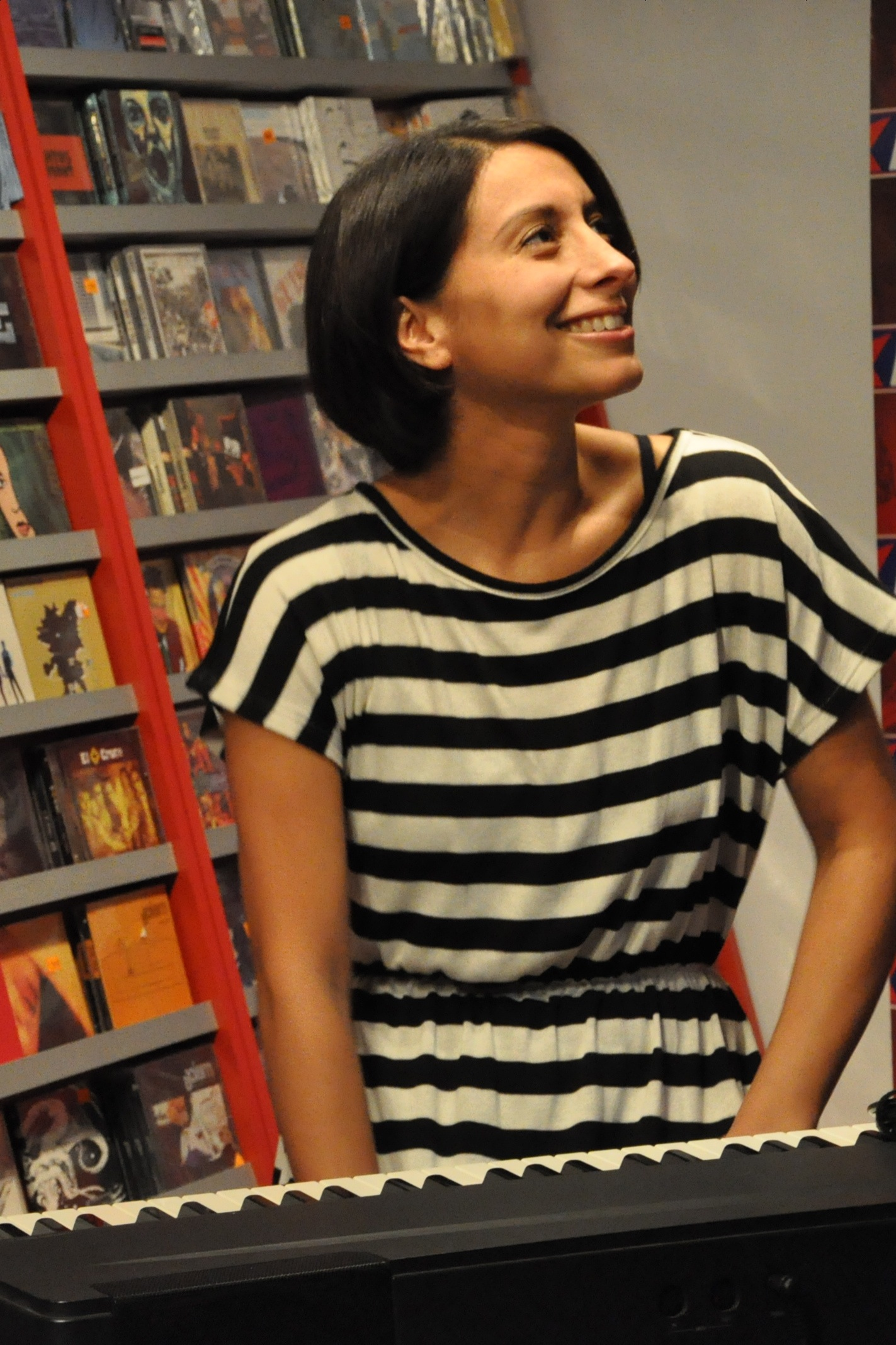
Carolina Nissen (2011)

Carolina Nissen (born April 21, 1976, Valdivia) is a Chilean singer. She debuted in 2010 with an album of pop-like songs.

Nissen studied piano at the Conservatory of Music at the Universidad Austral de Chile and then pedagogy in music education at the same university.

== Discography ==
Carolina Nissen (reissue (2011, Sello Azul))

1. "Miedo"
2. "Me Cuesta Entender"
3. "Pienso En Ti"
4. "Siempre Igual"
5. "Todo En Su Lugar"
6. "Fatal"
7. "Un Dia Feliz"
8. "Inocente"
9. "Cada Vez Que Te Vas"
10. "Que Te Pasa"
11. "Mimi"
12. "Guindo"

Tu Casa

1. "Bajo el Agua"
2. "Tu Casa"
3. "Las Partes que me Faltan"
4. "Interferencia"
5. "Equilibrio"
6. "Tanta Ambicion"
7. "Lo que se me Quedo"
8. "Casi me Quedo sin Voz"
9. "Las Piedras mas Brillantes"
10. "Todo Mejor"
