= Johan Nissen =

Danish new media artist (born 1958)

- Johan Nissen relaxing in his home in front of a wall sized painting by Thomas Warming
- Born: July 20, 1958; Copenhagen
- Known for: Painting, Digital Art

Johan Nissen (born July 20, 1958) is a Danish new media artist specializing in digital art.

== Biography ==
=== Early years ===
Johan Nissen grew up on Almindegaard in the Danish town Roskilde with his father Johan Nissen, a squire and third degree freemason, and his mother, a schoolteacher who was the first woman in Denmark to teach carpentry. They sent him to Steenhus Kostskole, a public boarding school, where he graduated high school. He then went to Israel where he joined the kibbutz life and learned Hebrew and worked as a volunteer.

After Nissen received a college degree in Denmark, he moved to Germany and then to Somerset in England, where he took interest in Roman culture and art.

=== Career ===
He went back to Denmark where he studied art history, and after a year he went traveling to Spain. He stayed on for several months working in real estate on the Balearic Islands, in Ibiza. He taught himself Spanish and was employed by a German millionaire to work for five years as a butler.

With his employer, a photographer and master-student of Joseph Beuys, at Kunstakademie Düsseldorf, he traveled Europe and during this time he became friends with Florian Schneider, Kraftwerk, and Grace Jones.

When he returned to Denmark, he started a nightclub in Copenhagen called "The Bridge" and worked in DJ management, theater and art. During this time Nissen became friends with the Danish illustrator Thomas Warming and documentary film director Tao Nørager.

In 2007 he went for one month to Spanish Harlem in New York and got inspired by American graffiti as pop arts. In 2008 Nissen started a shirt company, Nizen in Copenhagen, with digital prints, limited edition, featuring his own art.
