= Saint Nissen =

Early Irish abbot and saint

Saint Nessan
- Born: 5th century Ireland
- Residence: Mountgarret, County Wexford, Ireland
- Died: 5th century
- Feast: 25 July, and additionally 24 July in the Orthodox Church

Saint Nessan was an early Christian convert who was abbot of a monastery in County Wexford, Ireland.

== Life ==
Saint Nessan was converted to Christianity by Saint Patrick. He became abbot of Montgarth (Mountgarret) Abbey in Wexford, Ireland. His feast day is 25 July. He is additionally celebrated on 24 July in the Orthodox Church

== Monks of Ramsgate account ==
The monks of St Augustine's Abbey, Ramsgate, wrote in their Book of Saints (1921),

NESSAN (St.) Abbot (July 25)
(5th cent.) A convert in Ireland made by Saint Patrick, who set him over a monastery at Montgarth (Mountgarret) in the present county of Wexford.

== Butler's account ==
The hagiographer Alban Butler ( 1710–1773) wrote in his Lives of the Primitive Fathers, Martyrs, and Other Principal Saints, under April 9,

Saint Nessan, Abbot

Whom Saint Patrick baptized, ordained deacon, and appointed abbot of Montgairt or Mountgarret, in the county of Wexford, on the borders of Kilkenny, of which place he is titular saint. See Colgan in MSS. ad 25 Julij.

== Sources ==
- Butler, Alban (1833), The Lives of the Fathers, Martyrs, and Other Principal Saints: Compiled from Original Monuments and Other Authentic Records, Illustrated with the Remarks of Judicious Modern Critics and Historians, R. Coyne This article incorporates text from this source, which is in the public domain.
- "Saint Nissen of Wexford", CatholicSaints.info
- St. Augustine's Abbey, Ramsgate (1921), The Book of saints : a dictionary of servants of God canonized by the Catholic Church, London: A. & C. Black, ltd. This article incorporates text from this source, which is in the public domain.
