= June 30 =

June 30 this year in various calendars
- Tuesday, 30 June 2026
Akan	Nkyibene
Armenian	15 Hrotich 1475
Aztec	Tepeilhuitl 11, 3 Quiyahuitl
Babylonian	14 Simanu, 2337 SE
Balinese pawukon	Menga, Kajeng, Sri, Pon, Urukung, Anggara of Langkir, Ludra, Gigis, Pandita
Bengali	16 Asharh, BS 1433
Chinese	Yin Wood Pig・Tail Mansion; Fire Horse Year, Month 5, Day 16 (Xiazhi, 7 days until Xiaoshu)
Common Era	30 June 2026 CE
Coptic	23 Paoni, AM 1742
Egyptian	15 Athyr, 2775 NE
Ethiopian	23 Sanē, 2018 Amätä Məhrät
French Republican	Décade II, Duodi de Messidor de l'Année 234 de la République
Gregorian	30 June, AD 2026
Hebrew	15 Tamuz, AM 5786
Hindu	Pūrvāṣāḍha・Brahman; Solar: 16 Āṣāḍha, 1948 SE; Lunisolar: Pratipada, Kṛishna pakṣa of Jyeṣṭha, 2083 VE; Rāudra・5127 KY・1,872,756
Icelandic	Þriðjudagur, 9 Sólmánuður 2026
Islamic	14 Muharram, AH 1448 (using tabular method)
ISO week date	2026-W27-2
Japanese	16 Satsuki, Reiwa 8 (Geshi, 7 days until Shōsho)
Julian	17 June, AD 2026 (AM 7534)
Julian day	2461222
Korean	16 Maldal, 4359 DE
Maya	13.0.13.12.19; 12 Tzec, 3 Cauac
Roman	ante diem XV Kalendas Iulias, MMDCCLXXIX AUC
Solar Hijri	9 Tir, SH 1405
Tibetan	16 snron, me pho rta 2153 or 1772 or 1000

<<	June					>>
Su	Mo	Tu	We	Th	Fr	Sa
	1	2	3	4	5	6
7	8	9	10	11	12	13
14	15	16	17	18	19	20
21	22	23	24	25	26	27
28	29	30
2026

June 30 in recent years
2026 (Tuesday)
2025 (Monday)
2024 (Sunday)
2023 (Friday)
2022 (Thursday)
2021 (Wednesday)
2020 (Tuesday)
2019 (Sunday)
2018 (Saturday)
2017 (Friday)

June 30 is the 181st day of the year (182nd in leap years) in the Gregorian calendar; 184 days remain until the end of the year.

== Events ==
=== Pre-1600 ===
- 296 – Pope Marcellinus begins his papacy.
- 763 – The Byzantine army of emperor Constantine V defeats the Bulgarian forces in the Battle of Anchialus.
- 1398 – Zhu Yunwen ascended the throne to the Ming dynasty to become the Jianwen Emperor.
- 1422 – Battle of Arbedo between the duke of Milan and the Swiss cantons.
- 1521 – Spanish forces defeat a combined French and Navarrese army at the Battle of Noáin during the Spanish conquest of Iberian Navarre.
- 1559 – King Henry II of France is mortally wounded in a jousting match against Gabriel de Lorges, Count of Montgomery.
- 1598 – The Spanish-held Castillo San Felipe del Morro in San Juan, Puerto Rico having been besieged for fifteen days, surrenders to an English force under Sir George Clifford, Earl of Cumberland.

=== 1601–1900 ===
- 1632 – The University of Tartu is founded.
- 1643 – Royalists loyal to King Charles I led by the Earl of Newcastle defeat Parliamentarian troops commanded by Lord Fairfax in the battle of Adwalton Moor, allowing them to capture Bradford and Leeds.
- 1651 – The Deluge: Khmelnytsky Uprising: The Battle of Berestechko ends with a Polish victory.
- 1688 – The Immortal Seven issue the Invitation to William, which would culminate in the Glorious Revolution.
- 1691 – A Williamite army under Godert de Ginkell takes the city of Athlone from the Jacobites after a short siege.
- 1703 – The Battle of Ekeren between a Dutch force and a French force.
- 1758 – Seven Years' War: Habsburg Austrian forces destroy a Prussian reinforcement and supply convoy in the Battle of Domstadtl, helping to expel Prussian King Frederick the Great from Moravia.
- 1794 – Northwest Indian War: Native American forces under Blue Jacket attack Fort Recovery.
- 1805 – Under An act to divide the Indiana Territory into two separate governments, adopted by the U.S. Congress on January 11, 1805, the Michigan Territory is organized.
- 1859 – French acrobat Charles Blondin crosses Niagara Falls on a tightrope.
- 1860 – The 1860 Oxford evolution debate at the Oxford University Museum of Natural History takes place.
- 1864 – U.S. President Abraham Lincoln grants Yosemite Valley to California for "public use, resort and recreation".
- 1876 – Serbia declares war on the Ottoman Empire, leading to the Serbian Wars for Independence.
- 1882 – Charles J. Guiteau is hanged in Washington, D.C. for the assassination of U.S. President James Garfield.
- 1886 – The first transcontinental train trip across Canada departs from Montreal, Quebec. It arrives in Port Moody, British Columbia on July 4.
- 1892 – The Homestead Strike begins near Pittsburgh, Pennsylvania.
- 1900 – A savage fire wrecked three steamships docked at a pier in Hoboken, New Jersey. Over 200 crew members and passengers are killed, and hundreds injured.

=== 1901–present ===
- 1905 – Albert Einstein sends the article On the Electrodynamics of Moving Bodies, in which he introduces special relativity, for publication in Annalen der Physik.
- 1906 – The United States Congress passes the Meat Inspection Act and Pure Food and Drug Act.
- 1908 – The Tunguska Event, the largest impact event on Earth in human recorded history, resulting in a massive explosion over Eastern Siberia.
- 1912 – The Regina Cyclone, Canada's deadliest tornado event, kills 28 people in Regina, Saskatchewan.
- 1916 – World War I: In "the day Sussex died", elements of the Royal Sussex Regiment take heavy casualties in the Battle of the Boar's Head at Richebourg-l'Avoué in France.
- 1921 – U.S. President Warren G. Harding appoints former President William Howard Taft as Chief Justice of the United States.
- 1922 – In Washington D.C., U.S. Secretary of State Charles Evans Hughes and Dominican Ambassador Francisco J. Peynado sign the Hughes–Peynado agreement, which ends the United States occupation of the Dominican Republic.
- 1934 – The Night of the Long Knives, Adolf Hitler's violent purge of his political rivals in Germany, takes place.
- 1936 – Emperor Haile Selassie of Abyssinia appeals for aid to the League of Nations against Italy's invasion of his country.
- 1937 – The world's first emergency telephone number, 999, is introduced in London.
- 1944 – World War II: The Battle of Cherbourg ends with the fall of the strategically valuable port to American forces.
- 1953 – The first Chevrolet Corvette rolls off the assembly line in Flint, Michigan.
- 1956 – A TWA Super Constellation and a United Airlines DC-7 collide above the Grand Canyon in Arizona and crash, killing all 128 on board both airliners.
- 1959 – A United States Air Force F-100 Super Sabre from Kadena Air Base, Okinawa, crashes into a nearby elementary school, killing 11 students plus six residents from the local neighborhood.
- 1960 – Belgian Congo gains independence as Republic of the Congo (Léopoldville).
- 1963 – Ciaculli bombing: a car bomb, intended for Mafia boss Salvatore Greco, kills seven police officers and military personnel near Palermo.
- 1966 – The National Organization for Women, the United States' largest feminist organization, is founded.
- 1968 – Pope Paul VI issues the Credo of the People of God.
- 1971 – The crew of the Soviet Soyuz 11 spacecraft are killed when their air supply escapes through a faulty valve.
- 1972 – The first leap second is added to the UTC time system.
- 1973 – Concorde 001 intercepts the path of a total solar eclipse and follows the moon's shadow, experiencing the longest total eclipse observation.
- 1974 – The Baltimore municipal strike of 1974 begins.
- 1977 – The Southeast Asia Treaty Organization disbands.
- 1985 – Thirty-nine American hostages from the hijacked TWA Flight 847 are freed in Beirut after being held for 17 days.
- 1986 – The U.S. Supreme Court rules in Bowers v. Hardwick that states can outlaw homosexual acts between consenting adults.
- 1989 – A coup d'état in Sudan deposes the democratically elected government of Prime Minister Sadiq al-Mahdi and President Ahmed al-Mirghani.
- 1990 – East and West Germany merge their economies.
- 1993 – Malta is officially subdivided into 68 local councils by the Local Councils Act.
- 1994 – An Airbus A330-300 crashes during a test flight at Toulouse–Blagnac Airport, killing all seven people on board.
- 2007 – A Jeep Cherokee filled with propane canisters drives into the entrance of Glasgow Airport, Scotland in a failed terrorist attack. This was linked to the 2007 London car bombs that had taken place the day before.
- 2009 – Yemenia Flight 626, an Airbus A310-300, crashes into the Indian Ocean near Comoros, killing 152 of the 153 people on board. A 14-year-old girl named Bahia Bakari survives the crash.
- 2013 – Nineteen firefighters die controlling a wildfire near Yarnell, Arizona.
- 2013 – Protests begin around Egypt against President Mohamed Morsi and the ruling Freedom and Justice Party, leading to their overthrow during the 2013 Egyptian coup d'état.
- 2015 – A Hercules C-130 military aircraft with 113 people on board crashes in a residential area in Medan, Indonesia, resulting in at least 116 deaths.
- 2019 – Donald Trump becomes the first sitting US President to visit the Democratic People's Republic of Korea (North Korea).
- 2020 – The Hong Kong National Security Law is passed by the Standing Committee of the National People's Congress and immediately comes into effect after gazettal.
- 2021 – The Tiger Fire ignites near Black Canyon City, Arizona, and goes on to burn 16,278 acres (6,587 ha) of land before being fully contained on July 30.
- 2023 – A Tajik citizen with ISIS connections, wanted in Tajikistan for murder and kidnapping, kills two people at Chișinău International Airport in Moldova, after being denied entry to the country.

== Births ==
=== Pre-1600 ===
- 1286 – John de Warenne, 7th Earl of Surrey, English magnate (died 1347)
- 1468 – John, Elector of Saxony (died 1532)
- 1470 – Charles VIII of France (died 1498)
- 1478 – John, Prince of Asturias, Son of Ferdinand II of Aragon and Isabella I of Castile (died 1497)
- 1503 – John Frederick I, Elector of Saxony (died 1554)
- 1533 – Martín de Rada, Spanish missionary (died 1578)
- 1588 – Giovanni Maria Sabino, Italian organist, composer, and educator (died 1649)

=== 1601–1900 ===
- 1641 – Meinhardt Schomberg, 3rd Duke of Schomberg, German-English general (died 1719)
- 1685 – John Gay, English poet and playwright (died 1732)
- 1688 – Abu l-Hasan Ali I, ruler of Tunisia (died 1756)
- 1722 – Jiří Antonín Benda, Czech composer, violinist and Kapellmeister (died 1795)
- 1755 – Paul Barras, French soldier and politician (died 1829)
- 1789 – Horace Vernet, French painter and academic (died 1863)
- 1791 – Félix Savart, French physicist and psychologist (died 1841)
- 1803 – Thomas Lovell Beddoes, English poet, playwright, and physician (died 1849)
- 1807 – Friedrich Theodor Vischer, German author, poet, and playwright (died 1887)
- 1817 – Joseph Dalton Hooker, English botanist and explorer (died 1911)
- 1843 – Ernest Mason Satow, English orientalist and diplomat (died 1929)
- 1864 – Frederick Bligh Bond, English architect and archaeologist (died 1945)
- 1884 – Georges Duhamel, French author and critic (died 1966)
- 1889 – Archibald Frazer-Nash, English motor car designer, engineer and founder of Frazer Nash (died 1965)
- 1890 – Paul Boffa, Maltese physician and politician, 5th Prime Minister of Malta (died 1962)
- 1891 – Man Mountain Dean, American wrestler and sergeant (died 1953)
- 1891 – Ed Lewis, American wrestler and manager (died 1966)
- 1891 – Stanley Spencer, English painter (died 1959)
- 1892 – Pierre Blanchar, Algerian-French actor and director (died 1963)
- 1893 – Nellah Massey Bailey, American politician and librarian (died 1956)
- 1893 – Walter Ulbricht, German soldier and politician, chief decision maker and head of state of the GDR (East Germany) (died 1973)
- 1895 – Heinz Warneke, German-American sculptor and educator (died 1983)
- 1899 – Madge Bellamy, American actress (died 1990)

=== 1901–present ===
- 1904 – Marianne Angermann, German–Spanish–New Zealand biochemist (died 1977)
- 1905 – John Van Ryn, American tennis player (died 1999)
- 1906 – Anthony Mann, American actor and director (died 1967)
- 1907 – Roman Shukhevych, Ukrainian general and politician (died 1950)
- 1908 – Winston Graham, English author (died 2003)
- 1908 – Luigi Rovere, Italian film producer (died 1996)
- 1908 – Rob Nieuwenhuys, Dutch writer (died 1999)
- 1909 – Juan Bosch, 43rd President of the Dominican Republic (died 2001)
- 1911 – Czesław Miłosz, Polish novelist, essayist, and poet, Nobel Prize laureate (died 2004)
- 1911 – Nagarjun, Indian poet (died 1998)
- 1912 – Ludwig Bölkow, German engineer (died 2003)
- 1912 – Dan Reeves, American businessman and philanthropist (died 1971)
- 1912 – María Luisa Dehesa Gómez Farías, Mexican architect (died 2009)
- 1913 – Alfonso López Michelsen, Colombian lawyer and politician, 24th President of Colombia (died 2007)
- 1913 – Harry Wismer, American sportscaster (died 1967)
- 1914 – Francisco da Costa Gomes, Portuguese general and politician, 15th President of Portugal (died 2001)
- 1914 – Allan Houser, American sculptor and painter (died 1994)
- 1917 – Susan Hayward, American actress (died 1975)
- 1917 – Lena Horne, American actress, singer, and activist (died 2010)
- 1917 – Willa Kim, American costume designer (died 2016)
- 1919 – Ed Yost, American inventor of the modern hot air balloon (died 2007)
- 1920 – Eleanor Ross Taylor, American poet and educator (died 2011)
- 1921 – Washington SyCip, American-Filipino accountant (died 2017)
- 1924 – Max Trepp, Swiss sprinter (died 1990)
- 1925 – Fred Schaus, American basketball player and coach (died 2010)
- 1925 – Ebrahim Amini, Iranian politician (died 2020)
- 1926 – Paul Berg, American biochemist and academic, Nobel Prize laureate (died 2023)
- 1927 – Shirley Fry Irvin, American tennis player (died 2021)
- 1927 – James Goldman, American screenwriter and playwright (died 1998)
- 1927 – Mario Lanfranchi, Italian director, screenwriter, producer, collector and actor (died 2022)
- 1927 – Frank McCabe, American basketball player (died 2021)
- 1928 – Hassan Hassanzadeh Amoli, Islamic philosopher, theologian, mathematician and mystic (died 2021)
- 1928 – Nathaniel Tarn, American poet, essayist, anthropologist, and translator (died 2024)
- 1929 – Yang Ti-liang, Chinese judge (died 2023)
- 1930 – Ben Atchley, American politician (died 2018)
- 1930 – Ahmed Zaki Yamani, Saudi Arabian politician (died 2021)
- 1930 – Ignatius Peter VIII Abdalahad, Syrian bishop (died 2018)
- 1931 – Yo-Yo Davalillo, Venezuelan baseball player and manager (died 2013)
- 1931 – Andrew Hill, American pianist and composer (died 2007)
- 1931 – Ronald Rene Lagueux, American judge (died 2023)
- 1931 – Kaye Vaughan, American football player (died 2023)
- 1933 – Tomislav Ivić, Croatian football coach and manager (died 2011)
- 1933 – Joan Murrell Owens, American educator and marine biologist (died 2011)
- 1933 – M. J. K. Smith, English cricketer and rugby player (died 2026)
- 1933 – Orval Tessier, Canadian ice hockey player and coach (died 2022)
- 1933 – Cookie, Australian Major Mitchell's cockatoo, oldest recorded parrot (died 2016)
- 1934 – Harry Blackstone Jr., American magician and author (died 1997)
- 1935 – John Harlin, American pilot and mountaineer (died 1966)
- 1936 – Assia Djebar, Algerian-French author and translator (died 2015)
- 1936 – Nancy Dussault, American actress and singer
- 1936 – Tony Musante, American actor and screenwriter (died 2013)
- 1936 – Dave Van Ronk, American singer-songwriter and guitarist (died 2002)
- 1937 – Larry Henley, American singer-songwriter (died 2014)
- 1938 – Billy Mills, American distance runner
- 1938 – Jeri Taylor, American screenwriter (died 2024)
- 1939 – Tony Hatch, English pianist, composer, and producer
- 1939 – Barry Hines, English author and screenwriter (died 2016)
- 1939 – José Emilio Pacheco, Mexican poet and author (died 2014)
- 1940 – Mark Spoelstra, American singer-songwriter and guitarist (died 2007)
- 1941 – Peter Pollock, South African cricketer and author
- 1942 – Robert Ballard, American lieutenant and oceanographer
- 1942 – Ron Harris, Canadian ice hockey player and coach
- 1943 – Florence Ballard, American pop/soul singer (died 1976)
- 1943 – Saeed Akhtar Mirza, Indian director and screenwriter
- 1944 – Terry Funk, American wrestler (died 2023)
- 1944 – Raymond Moody, American parapsychologist and author
- 1944 – Glenn Shorrock, English-Australian singer-songwriter
- 1944 – Ron Swoboda, American baseball player and sportscaster
- 1949 – Uwe Kliemann, German footballer, coach, and manager
- 1949 – Andy Scott, Welsh singer-songwriter, guitarist, and producer
- 1949 – Bùi Thanh Liêm, Vietnamese cosmonaut (died 1981)
- 1951 – Stanley Clarke, American bass player and composer
- 1952 – Athanassios S. Fokas, Greek mathematician and academic
- 1952 – David Garrison, American actor and singer
- 1953 – Hal Lindes, American-English guitarist and film score composer
- 1954 – Stephen Barlow, English organist, composer, and conductor
- 1954 – Pierre Charles, Dominican educator and politician, 5th Prime Minister of Dominica (died 2004)
- 1954 – Serzh Sargsyan, Armenian politician, 3rd President of Armenia
- 1954 – Wayne Swan, Australian academic and politician, 14th Deputy Prime Minister of Australia
- 1955 – Brian Vollmer, Canadian singer
- 1955 – Egils Levits, Latvian judge, jurist, 10th President of Latvia
- 1956 – Volker Beck, German hurdler and coach
- 1956 – David Lidington, English historian, academic, and politician, Minister of State for Europe
- 1956 – David Alan Grier, American actor, singer, and comedian
- 1957 – Bud Black, American baseball player and manager
- 1957 – Sterling Marlin, American race car driver
- 1958 – Pam Royle, British television presenter, journalist and voice coach
- 1958 – Esa-Pekka Salonen, Finnish conductor and composer
- 1959 – Vincent D'Onofrio, American actor
- 1959 – Daniel Goldhagen, American political scientist, author, and academic
- 1959 – Brendan Perry, English singer-songwriter, guitarist, and producer
- 1959 – Sakis Tsiolis, Greek footballer and manager
- 1959 – Sandip Verma, Baroness Verma, Indian-English businesswoman and politician
- 1960 – Jack McConnell, Scottish educator and politician, 3rd First Minister of Scotland
- 1960 – Murray Cook, Australian musician, actor, songwriter and producer
- 1961 – Lynne Jolitz, American computer scientist and programmer
- 1961 – Clive Nolan, English musician, composer and producer
- 1962 – Tony Fernández, Dominican baseball player (died 2020)
- 1962 – Julianne Regan, English singer-songwriter and guitarist
- 1963 – Olha Bryzhina, Ukrainian sprinter
- 1963 – Rupert Graves, English actor, director, and screenwriter
- 1963 – Yngwie Malmsteen, Swedish guitarist and songwriter
- 1964 – Alexandra, Countess of Frederiksborg
- 1964 – Mark Waters, American director and producer
- 1965 – Steve Duchesne, Canadian-American ice hockey player and coach
- 1965 – Cho Jae-hyun, South Korean actor
- 1965 – Anna Levandi, Russian figure skater and coach
- 1965 – Gary Pallister, English footballer and sportscaster
- 1965 – Mitch Richmond, American basketball player
- 1966 – Mike Tyson, American boxer and actor
- 1967 – Patrik Bodén, Swedish javelin thrower
- 1967 – David Busst, English footballer and manager
- 1967 – Victoria Kaspi, American-Canadian astrophysicist and academic
- 1968 – Phil Anselmo, American singer-songwriter and producer
- 1969 – Sanath Jayasuriya, Sri Lankan cricketer and politician
- 1969 – Uta Rohländer, German sprinter
- 1969 – Sébastien Rose, Canadian director and screenwriter
- 1970 – Brian Bloom, American actor and screenwriter
- 1970 – Antonio Chimenti, Italian footballer and manager
- 1970 – Mark Grudzielanek, American baseball player and manager
- 1971 – Monica Potter, American actress
- 1972 – Sandra Cam, Belgian swimmer
- 1972 – Molly Parker, Canadian actress
- 1973 – Chan Ho Park, South Korean baseball player
- 1973 – Frank Rost, German footballer and manager
- 1974 – Katrin Auer, Austrian politician
- 1974 – Hezekiél Sepeng, South African runner
- 1975 – James Bannatyne, New Zealand footballer
- 1975 – Ralf Schumacher, German race car driver
- 1978 – Ben Cousins, Australian footballer
- 1978 – Patrick Ivuti, Kenyan runner
- 1978 – Claudio Rivalta, Italian footballer
- 1979 – Sylvain Chavanel, French cyclist
- 1980 – Rade Prica, Swedish footballer
- 1980 – Seyi Olofinjana, Nigerian footballer
- 1980 – Ryan ten Doeschate, Dutch cricketer
- 1981 – Can Artam, Turkish race car driver
- 1981 – Matt Kirk, Canadian football player
- 1981 – Desi Lydic, American comedian and actress
- 1981 – Barbora Špotáková, Czech javelin thrower
- 1981 – Ben Utecht, American football player
- 1982 – Lizzy Caplan, American actress
- 1982 – Ignacio Carrasco, Mexican footballer
- 1983 – Marcus Burghardt, German cyclist
- 1983 – Katherine Ryan, UK-based Canadian comedian and presenter
- 1983 – Cheryl, English singer and TV personality
- 1984 – Fantasia Barrino, American singer-songwriter and actress
- 1984 – Dax Harwood, American wrestler
- 1984 – Tunku Ismail Idris, Crown Prince of Johor, Malaysia
- 1985 – Trevor Ariza, American basketball player
- 1985 – Michael Phelps, American swimmer
- 1985 – Cody Rhodes, American wrestler
- 1985 – Fabiana Vallejos, Argentinian footballer
- 1986 – Alicia Fox, American wrestler, model, and actress
- 1986 – Fredy Guarín, Colombian footballer
- 1986 – Nicola Pozzi, Italian footballer
- 1986 – Allegra Versace, Italian-American businesswoman
- 1987 – Ryan Cook, American baseball player
- 1987 – Andrew Hedgman, New Zealand runner
- 1988 – Jacksfilms, American YouTuber
- 1988 – Joe Mazzulla, American basketball coach
- 1989 – Asbel Kiprop, Kenyan runner
- 1989 – Steffen Liebig, German rugby player
- 1989 – David Myers, Australian footballer
- 1991 – Jaimin Rajani, Indian singer-songwriter
- 1993 – Trea Turner, American baseball player
- 1995 – bbno$, Canadian singer-songwriter
- 1997 – A. J. Brown, American football player
- 1997 – Reuben Garrick, Australian rugby league player
- 1998 – Tom Davies, English footballer

== Deaths ==
=== Pre-1600 ===
- 350 – Nepotianus, Roman ruler
- 710 – Erentrude, Frankish abbess
- 888 – Æthelred, archbishop of Canterbury
- 1066 – St.Theobald Of Provins
- 1181 – Hugh de Kevelioc, 5th Earl of Chester, Welsh politician (born 1147)
- 1224 – Adolf of Osnabrück, German monk and bishop (born 1185)
- 1278 – Pierre de la Broce, French courtier
- 1337 – Eleanor de Clare, English noblewoman (born 1290)
- 1364 – Arnošt of Pardubice, Czech archbishop (born 1297)
- 1538 – Charles II, Duke of Guelders (born 1467)
- 1522 – Johann Reuchlin, German humanist and Hebrew scholar (born 1455)

=== 1601–1900 ===
- 1607 – Caesar Baronius, Italian cardinal and historian (born 1538)
- 1649 – Simon Vouet, French painter (born 1590)
- 1660 – William Oughtred, English minister and mathematician (born 1575)
- 1666 – Alexander Brome, English poet and playwright (born 1620)
- 1670 – Henrietta of England (born 1644)
- 1704 – John Quelch, English pirate (born 1665)
- 1708 – Tekle Haymanot I of Ethiopia (born 1684)
- 1709 – Edward Lhuyd, Welsh botanist, linguist, and geographer (born 1660)
- 1785 – James Oglethorpe, English general and politician, 1st Colonial Governor of Georgia (born 1696)
- 1796 – Abraham Yates Jr., American lawyer and politician (born 1724)
- 1857 – Alcide d'Orbigny, French zoologist and paleontologist (born 1802)
- 1882 – Charles J. Guiteau, American preacher and lawyer, assassin of James A. Garfield (born 1841)
- 1882 – Alberto Henschel, German-Brazilian photographer and businessman (born 1827)
- 1890 – Samuel Parkman Tuckerman, American organist and composer (born 1819)

=== 1901–present ===
- 1908 – Thomas Hill, American painter (born 1829)
- 1913 – Alphonse Kirchhoffer, French fencer (born 1873)
- 1916 – Eunice Eloisae Gibbs Allyn, American correspondent, author, and poet (born 1847)
- 1917 – Antonio de La Gándara, French painter and illustrator (born 1861)
- 1917 – Dadabhai Naoroji, Parsi intellectual, educator, cotton trader, and an early Indian political and social leader (born 1825)
- 1919 – John William Strutt, 3rd Baron Rayleigh, English physicist and academic, Nobel Prize laureate (born 1842)
- 1932 – Bruno Kastner, German actor, producer, and screenwriter (born 1890)
- 1934 – Karl Ernst, German soldier and SA commander (born 1904)
- 1934 – Erich Klausener, German soldier and politician (born 1885)
- 1934 – Gustav Ritter von Kahr, German lawyer and politician, Minister-President of Bavaria (born 1862)
- 1934 – Gregor Strasser, German lieutenant, politician, and early leader of the Nazi Party (born 1892)
- 1934 – Kurt von Schleicher, German general and politician, 23rd Chancellor of Germany (born 1882)
- 1941 – Yefim Fomin, Belarusian politician (born 1909)
- 1941 – Aleksander Tõnisson, Estonian general and politician, 5th Estonian Minister of War (born 1875)
- 1948 – Prince Sabahaddin, Turkish-Swiss sociologist and academic (born 1879)
- 1949 – Édouard Alphonse James de Rothschild, French financier and polo player (born 1868)
- 1951 – Yrjö Saarela, Finnish wrestler and coach (born 1884)
- 1953 – Elsa Beskow, Swedish author and illustrator (born 1874)
- 1953 – Charles William Miller, Brazilian footballer and civil servant (born 1874)
- 1954 – Andrass Samuelsen, Faroese politician, 1st Prime Minister of the Faroe Islands (born 1873)
- 1956 – Thorleif Lund, Norwegian actor (born 1880)
- 1959 – José Vasconcelos, Mexican philosopher and politician (born 1882)
- 1961 – Lee de Forest, American inventor, invented the audion tube (born 1873)
- 1966 – Giuseppe Farina, Italian race car driver (born 1906)
- 1966 – Margery Allingham, English author of detective fiction (born 1904)
- 1968 – Ernst Marcus, German zoologist (born 1893)
- 1971 – Georgi Asparuhov, Bulgarian footballer (born 1943)
- 1971 – Herbert Biberman, American director and screenwriter (born 1900)
- 1971 – Georgy Dobrovolsky Ukrainian pilot and astronaut (born 1928)
- 1971 – Nikola Kotkov, Bulgarian footballer (born 1938)
- 1971 – Viktor Patsayev, Kazakh engineer and astronaut (born 1933)
- 1971 – Vladislav Volkov, Russian engineer and astronaut (born 1935)
- 1973 – Nancy Mitford, English journalist and author (born 1904)
- 1973 – Vasyl Velychkovsky, Ukrainian-Canadian bishop and martyr (born 1903)
- 1974 – Alberta Williams King, Civil rights activist (born 1904)
- 1976 – Firpo Marberry, American baseball player and umpire (born 1898)
- 1984 – Lillian Hellman, American author and playwright (born 1905)
- 1985 – Haruo Remeliik, Palauan politician, 1st President of Palau (born 1933)
- 1995 – Georgy Beregovoy, Ukrainian general and astronaut (born 1921)
- 1995 – Gale Gordon, American actor and voice artist (born 1906)
- 1996 – Lakis Petropoulos, Greek footballer and manager (born 1932)
- 2001 – Chet Atkins, American singer-songwriter, guitarist, and producer (born 1924)
- 2001 – Joe Henderson, American saxophonist and composer (born 1937)
- 2002 – Chico Xavier, Brazilian medium and author (born 1910)
- 2003 – Buddy Hackett, American actor and comedian (born 1924)
- 2003 – Robert McCloskey, American author and illustrator (born 1915)
- 2004 – Eddie Burns, Australian rugby league player (born 1916)
- 2007 – Sahib Singh Verma, Indian librarian and politician, 4th Chief Minister of Delhi (born 1943)
- 2009 – Pina Bausch, German dancer, choreographer, and director (born 1940)
- 2009 – Harve Presnell, American actor and singer (born 1933)
- 2012 – Michael Abney-Hastings, 14th Earl of Loudoun, English-Australian politician (born 1942)
- 2012 – Yitzhak Shamir, Israeli politician, 7th Prime Minister of Israel (born 1915)
- 2012 – Michael J. Ybarra, American journalist and author (born 1966)
- 2013 – Alan Campbell, Baron Campbell of Alloway, English lawyer and judge (born 1917)
- 2013 – Akpor Pius Ewherido, Nigerian politician (born 1963)
- 2013 – Kathryn Morrison, American educator and politician (born 1942)
- 2013 – Thompson Oliha, Nigerian footballer (born 1968)
- 2013 – Keith Seaman, Australian politician, 29th Governor of South Australia (born 1920)
- 2014 – Frank Cashen, American businessman (born 1925)
- 2014 – Paul Mazursky, American actor, director, producer, and screenwriter (born 1930)
- 2014 – Željko Šturanović, Montenegrin lawyer and politician, 31st Prime Minister of Montenegro (born 1960)
- 2015 – Charles W. Bagnal, American general (born 1934)
- 2015 – Robert Dewar, English-American computer scientist and academic (born 1945)
- 2015 – Arthur Porter, Canadian physician and academic (born 1956)
- 2015 – Leonard Starr, American author and illustrator (born 1925)
- 2017 – Barry Norman, English television presenter (born 1933)
- 2017 – Simone Veil, French lawyer and politician (born 1927)
- 2018 – Smoke Dawg, Canadian rapper (born 1996)
- 2020 – Stella Madzimbamuto, Zimbabwean activist (born 1930)
- 2021 – Raj Kaushal, Indian Film Director and Producer (born 1971)
- 2025 – Kenneth Colley, English actor (born 1937)
- 2025 – Jim Shooter, American author and illustrator (born 1951)

== Holidays and observances ==
- Christian feast day:
  - St. Paul the Apostle (solo feast day)
  - Feast of the 12 Apostles
  - First Martyrs of the Church of Rome
  - Our Lady of Good Help (Quebec, Canada)
  - St. Martial
  - St. Theobald of Provins
  - Erentrude
  - St. Adolf of Osnabrück
  - St. Otto of Bamberg
  - Blessed Philip Powell
  - Blessed Vasyl Velychkovsky
  - Blessed Zynoviy Kovalyk
  - June 30 (Eastern Orthodox liturgics)
- Armed Forces Day (Guatemala)
- Asteroid Day (International observance)
- General Prayer Day (Central African Republic)
- Independence Day (Democratic Republic of the Congo), celebrates the independence of Democratic Republic of the Congo from Belgium in 1960.
- Navy Day (Israel)
- Philippine–Spanish Friendship Day (Philippines)
- Revolution Day (Sudan)
- Teachers' Day (Dominican Republic)
