= June 30 (Eastern Orthodox liturgics) =

Day in the Eastern Orthodox liturgical calendar

Eastern Orthodox liturgical calendar
June 29	June 30	July 1
June 30 O.S. ≍ July 13 N.S. June 30 N.S ≍ June 17 O.S.

An Eastern Orthodox cross

June 30 in Eastern Orthodox liturgical calendars is a feast day and a day of commemoration of saints and martyrs. Although some Orthodox churches use the Revised Julian Calendar and others use the traditional Julian calendar, the fixed commemorations for their respective June 30 are broadly the same, no matter which calendar is used. (Note: Despite the dates being the same, the days to which they refer typically differ by 13 days. The notation Old Style or O.S. is sometimes used to indicate a date in the traditional Julian Calendar (the "Old Calendar"). The notation New Style or N.S. indicates a date in the Revised Julian calendar (the "New Calendar").)

== Saints ==
- Synaxis of the Holy, Glorious, and All-Praised Twelve Apostles: (Note: Name days celebrated today include: Apostolos (Ἀπόστολος); Apostolia (Ἀποστολία).)

- Peter, Andrew, James and John the sons of Zebedee, Philip, Bartholomew, Thomas, Matthew, James the son of Alphaeus, Jude the brother of James, Simon the Zealot, and Matthias.

- Saint Mary of Jerusalem, mother of Apostle Mark (1st century) (see also: June 29)
- Saint Phygellus, Bishop of Ephesus, of the Seventy Apostles.
- Martyr Basilides the Soldier, at Alexandria (202) (Note: "At Alexandria, the passion of St. Basilides, under the emperor Severus. He protected from the insults of profligate men the saintly virgin Potamiœna, whom he was leading to execution, and received from her the reward of his pious action. For, at the end of three days, she appeared to him, and placing a crown on his head, not only converted him to Christ, but by her prayers made of him, after a short combat, a glorious martyr.") (see also: June 28)
- Martyr Meliton, by the sword.
- Martyr Peter of Sinope, dragged to death.
- Saint Dinara, Queen of Khereti, Georgia (10th century)

== Pre-Schism Western saints ==
- Protomartyrs of Rome, falsely charged by Nero with burning down the city and were ordered to undergo various cruel deaths (64) (Note: Protomartyrs of Rome. They were falsely charged by Nero with burning down the city and were ordered to undergo various cruel deaths; some were covered with the skins of wild beasts and thrown to wild dogs to be torn apart; others were crucified and when daylight failed were used as human torches. They were all disciples of the Apostles and the first fruits of the martyrs whom the Church of Rome sent to the Lord.)
- Martyrs Gaius the Priest and Leo the Subdeacon, either in North Africa or in Rome. (Note: "The same day, the saints Caius, priest, and Leo, subdeacon.")
- Saint Lucina, an early martyr in Rome. (Note: "At Rome, St. Lucina, a disciple of the Apostles, who relieved the necessities of the saints with her goods, visited the Christians detained in prison, buried the martyrs, and was laid by their side in a crypt constructed by herself.")
- Virgin-Martyr Emiliana, in Rome. (Note: "In the same city, St. Æmiliana, martyr.")
- Saint Martial, first Bishop of Limoges and "Apostle of the Limousin", together with two of his priests, Alpinian and Austriclinian (3rd century) (Note: "At Limoges, in France, St. Martial, bishop, with two priests, Alpinian and Austriclinian, whose lives were distinguished for miracles.")
- Saint Eurgain, foundress of Cor-Eurgain in Wales, later called Llantwit (6th century)
- Saint Bertrand, Bishop of Le Mans (623) (Note: Born in Autun in France, he met St Germanus in Paris and later became Bishop of Le Mans. He took a great interest in agriculture and wine-growing and loved the poor.)
- Saint Clotsindis (Clotsend), foundress of Marchiennes Abbey (c. 635-714) (Note: Daughter of St Adalbald and St Rictrudis, who founded the convent of Marchiennes in the north of France. Clotsindis succeeded her mother as second abbess.)
- Saint Erentrude, Abbess of Nonnberg Monastery, Salzburg (c. 718) (Note: A sister or niece of St Rupert, Apostle of Salzburg. She was the first Abbess of Nonnberg in Salzburg, founded for her by Rupert.)
- Saint Marcian, Bishop of Pampeluna in Spain, he was present at the Sixth Council of Toledo in 737 (c. 757)
- Saint Ostianus, a saint venerated at Viviers in France. (Note: "In the territory of Viviers, St. Ostian, priest and confessor.")

== Post-Schism Orthodox saints ==
- Saint George of the Holy Mountain and Georgia (1065) (see also: June 27 )
- Saint Andrew, Prince of Bogolubovo (1174)
- Saint Peter, Prince of the Tatar Horde, Wonderworker of Rostov (1290) (Note: See also: (in Russian) Пётр Ордынский. Википедии. (Russian Wikipedia).)
- Saint Gelasius of Rimet in Transylvania (14th century)
- Saint Parasceve of Kevrolsk (near Arkhangelsk), sister of Artemius of Verkola (16th century) (Note: Her tomb in Kevrolsk, found in 1610, is claimed as the source of many miracles. See also: June 23.)
- Saint Stephen of Omsk (1877)
- Venerable Gervasios (Paraskevopoulos) of Patras, Archimandrite and Greek theologian, distinguished by his rich pastoral, ecclesiastical, charitable and social work in Patras (1964) (Note: He was elected Abbot of the Girokomeio Monastery from 1916, and was also Protosynkellos of the Archdiocese of Athens (1939-1941).) (Note: He was glorified by the Ecumenical Patriarchate on November 16, 2023. The official communiqué of the Ecumenical Patriarchate was as follows: (in Greek) "1. Κατ᾿ αὐτήν ὁμοφώνῳ συνοδικῇ ἀποφάσει κατετάγησαν εἰς τό Ἀγιολόγιον τῆς Ὀρθοδόξου Ἐκκλησίας: α) ὁ Ἱερομόναχος Ἀθανάσιος Χαμακιώτης, ἐκ τῆς Ἱερᾶς Μητροπόλεως Κηφισίας, Ἀμαρουσίου, Ὠρωποῦ καί Μαραθῶνος, καί β) ὁ Ἀρχιμανδρίτης Γερβάσιος Παρασκευόπουλος, ἐκ τῆς Ἱερᾶς Μητροπόλεως Πατρῶν, ἀμφότεροι διακριθέντες ἐπί ὁσιότητι καί θυσιαστικῇ διακονίᾳ τοῦ Χριστωνύμου λαοῦ, ἐγχαραχθέντες ἐξ ἀρχῆς ὡς Ἅγιοι εἰς τήν συνείδησιν αὐτοῦ." The Ecumenical Patriarchate later signed the Patriarchal and Synodal Act of canonization on December 28, 2023.)

=== New martyrs and confessors ===
- New Martyr Michael Paknanas the Gardener, of Athens (1770)
- New Hieromartyr Timothy Petropavlovsk, Priest (1918) (Note: See also: (in Russian) Петропавловский, Тимофей Александрович. Википедии. (Russian Wikipedia).)
- New Hieromartyr Nicandor (Prusak), Hieromonk of Tolga Monastery, Yaroslavl (1918)
- New Hieromartyr Theogenes (Kozyrev), Archimandrite, of Chimkent, Kazakhstan (1939) (Note: See also: (in Russian) Феоген (Козырев). Википедии. (Russian Wikipedia).)
- New Hieromartyr Milan Popovic, Priest, of Rmanj Monastery, by the Ustashas (1941) (Note: See: (in Serbian) Милан Поповић (свештеник). Википедију. (Serbian Wikipedia).)
- New Martyr Alexander (Schmorell) of Munich (1943)
- New Martyr John Demidov (1944)

== Other commemorations ==
- Icon of the Mother of God of Balikin (1711) (Note: See also: (in Russian) Балыкинская икона Божией Матери. Википедии. (Russian Wikipedia).)
- Icon of the Mother of God of Gorbanevsk (1786)
- Repose of Bishop Nestor (Zass) of the Aleutians and Alaska (1882) (Note: See: (in Russian) Нестор (Засс). Википедии. (Russian Wikipedia).)
- Commemoration of the Slaughtered Christians at Diyarbekir of Asia Minor under the Turks and Kurds (1895) (Note: This commemoration was established by the Patriarchate of Alexandria in 1896, to be observed on June 30.)
- Glorification (1918) of Saint Sophronius, Bishop of Irkutsk (1771) (Note: See also: (in Russian) Софроний (Кристалевский). Википедии. (Russian Wikipedia).)

== Icon gallery ==
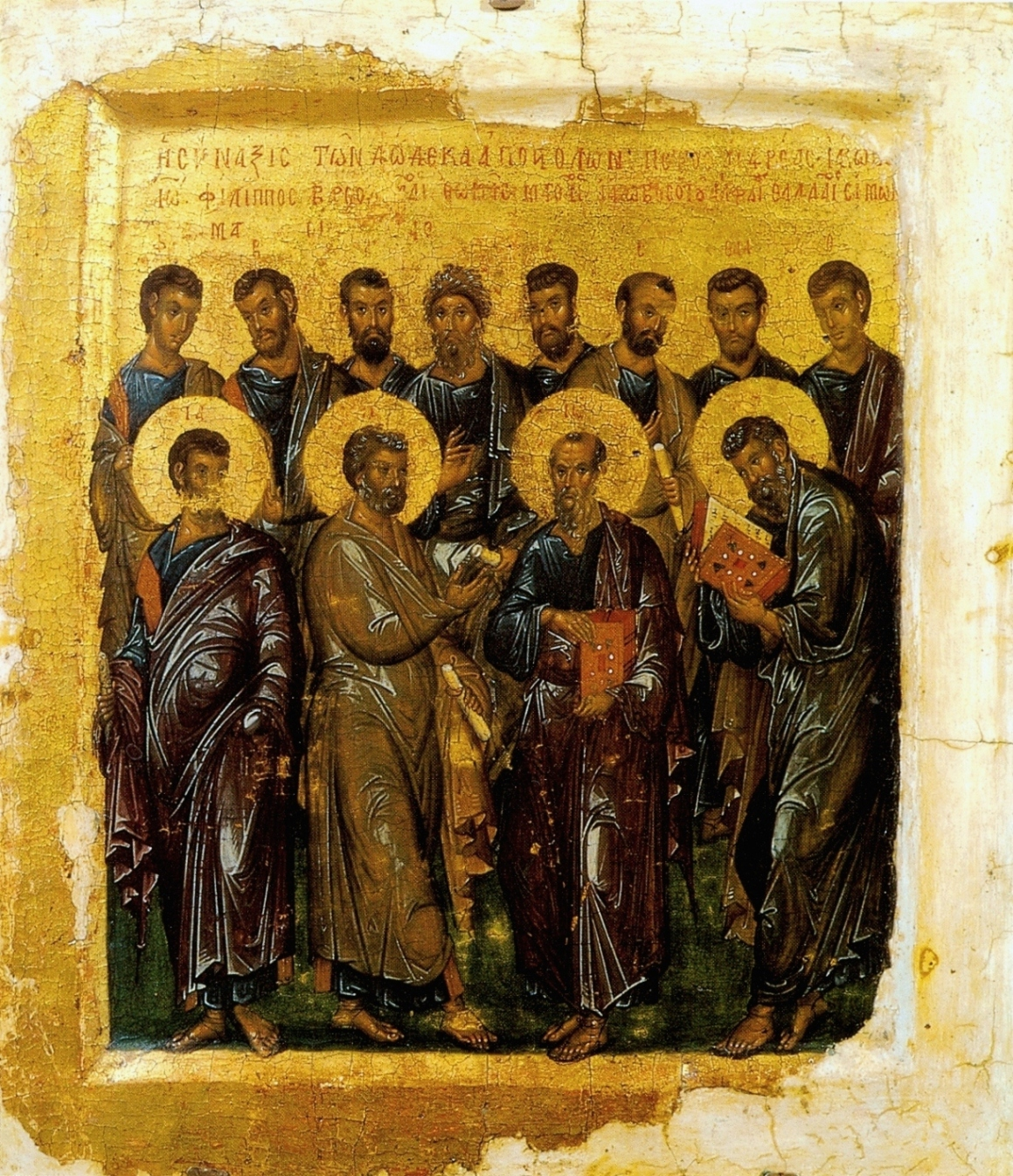
Synaxis of the Holy, Glorious, and All-Praised Twelve Apostles.

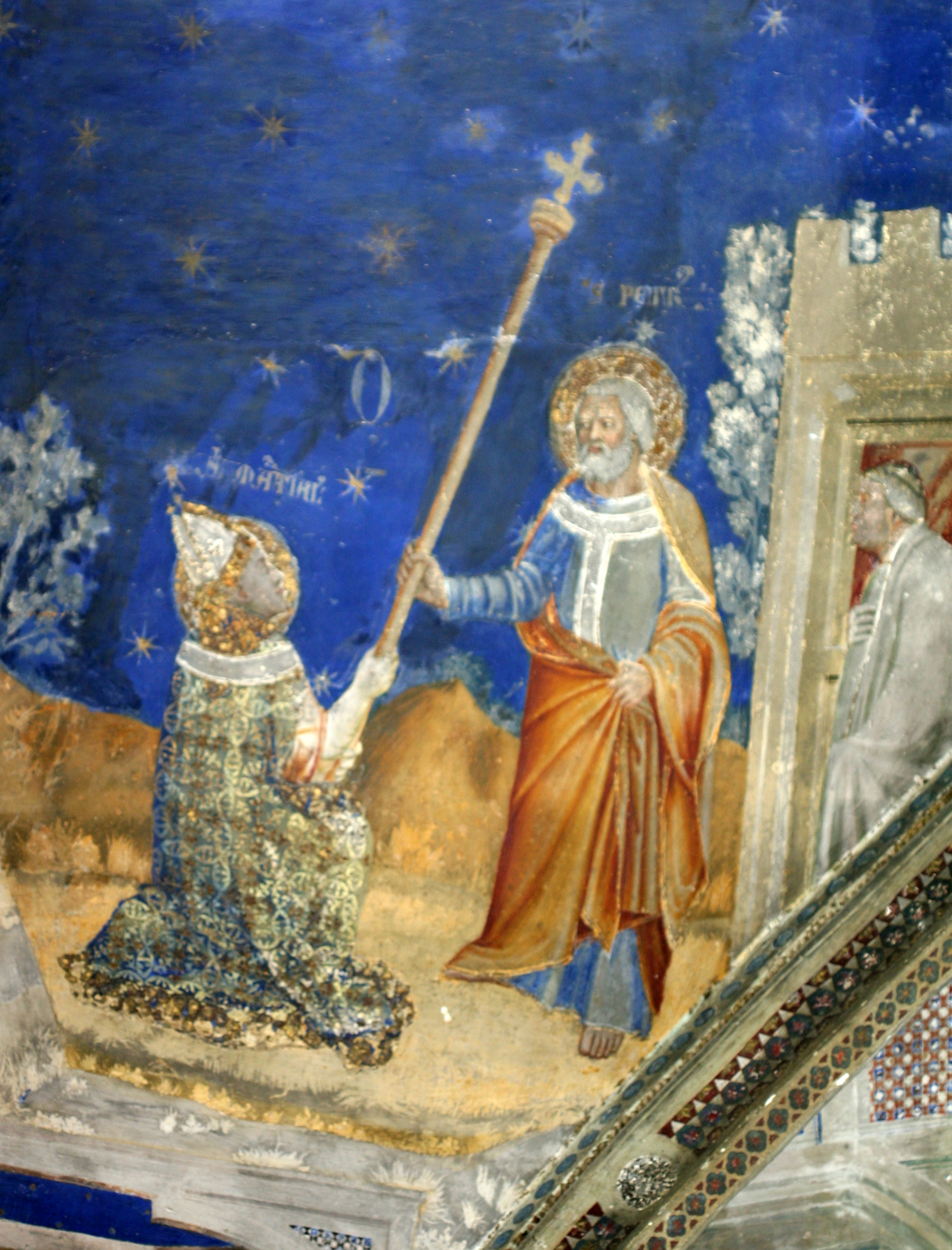
St. Martial of Limoges receives the pastoral staff from St Peter.

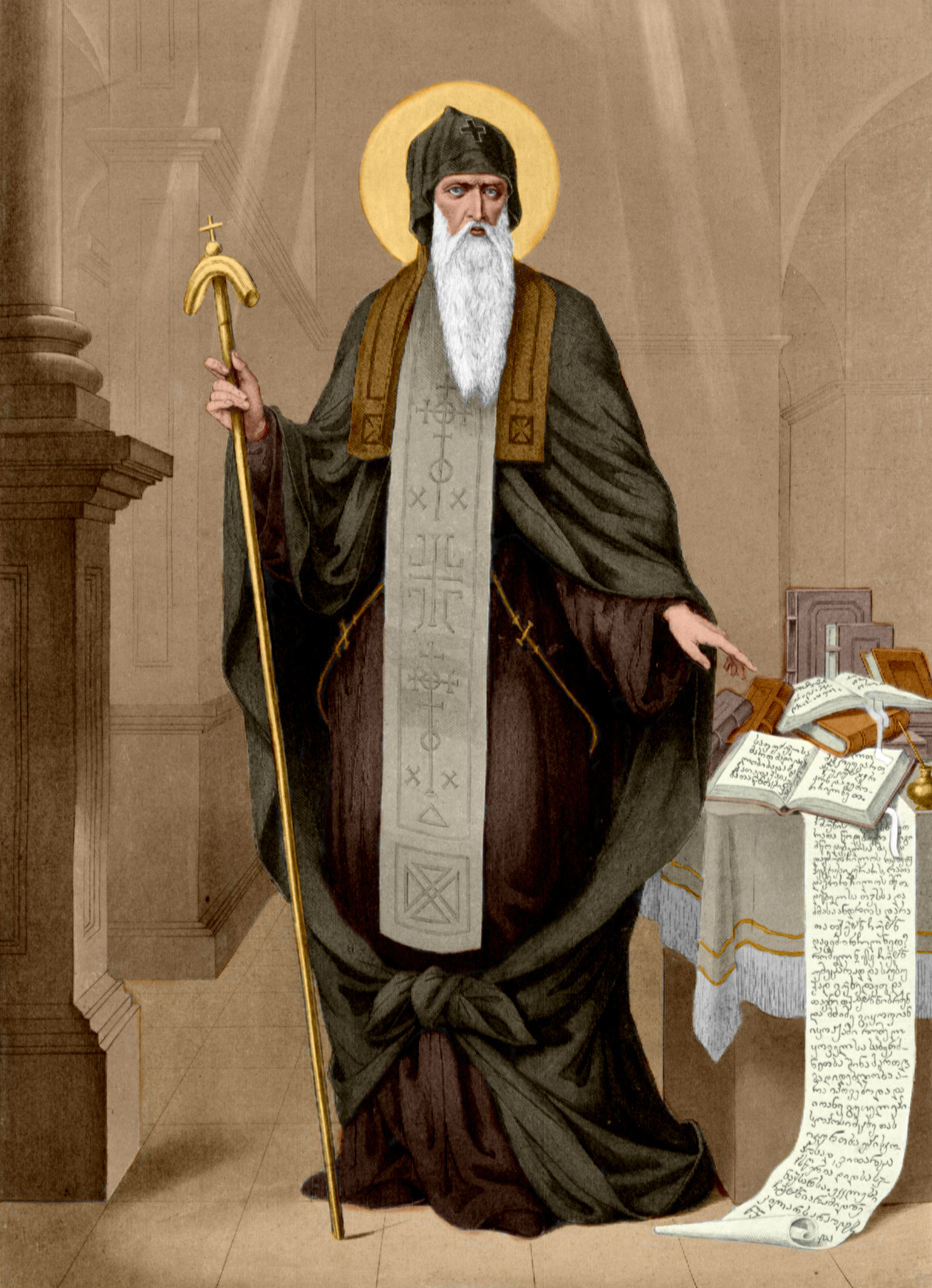
St. George of the Holy Mountain and Georgia.

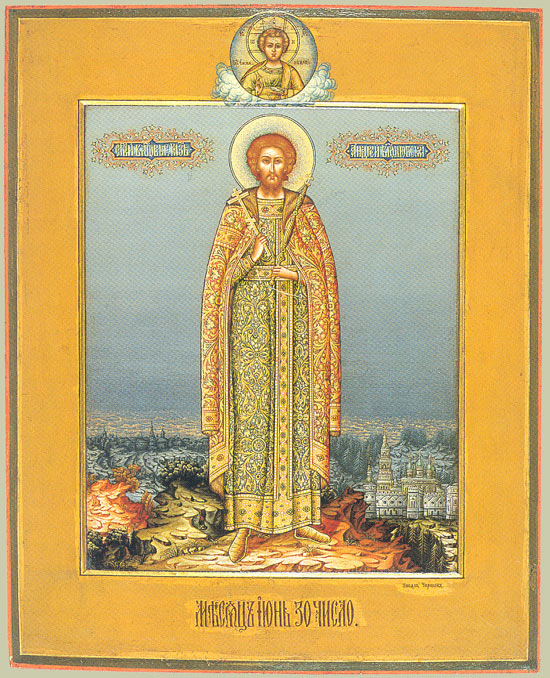
St. Andrew, Prince of Bogoliubovo.

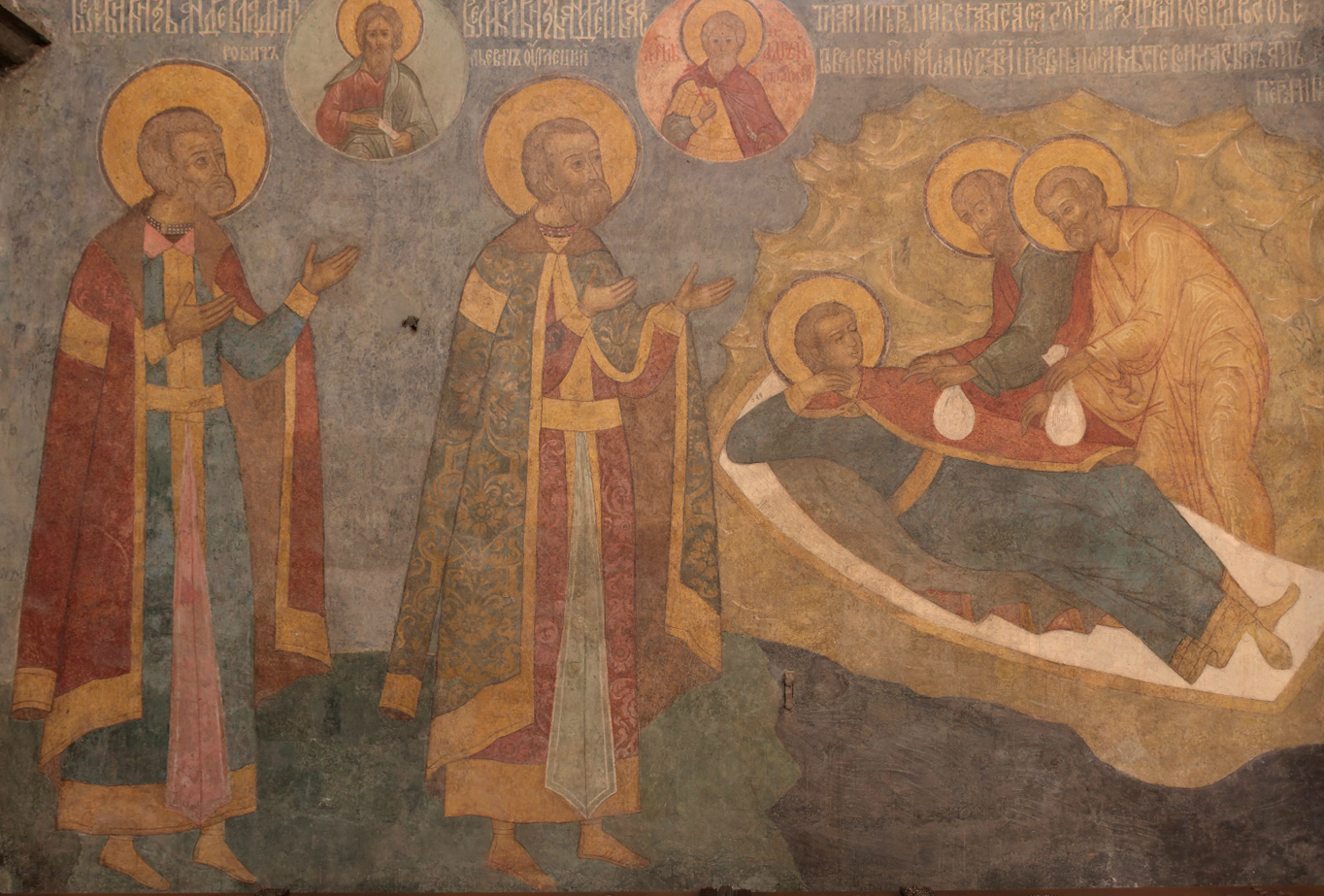
St. Peter the Prince of Ordinsk, Rostov.

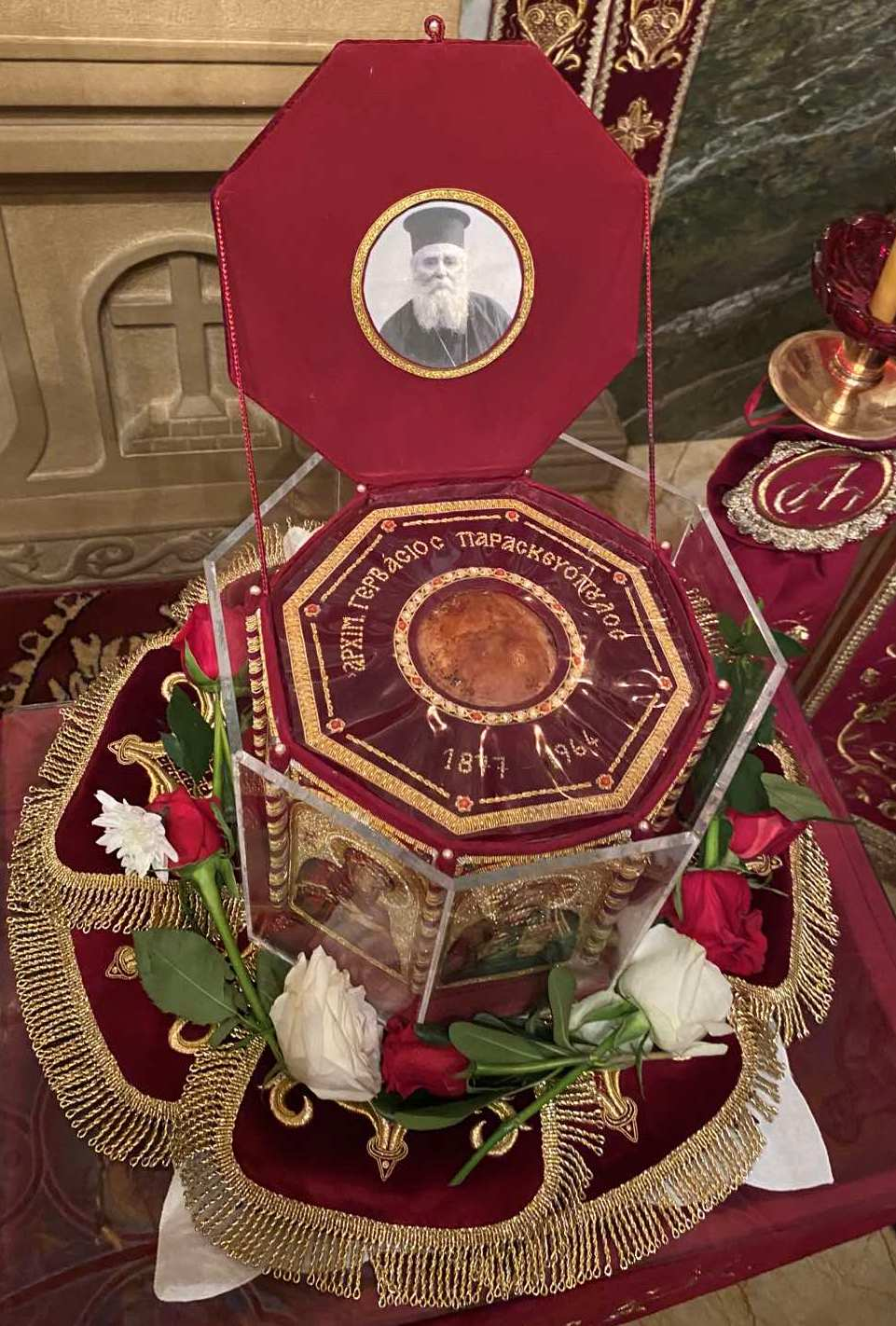
The skull of Venerable Gervasios (Paraskevopoulos) of Patras.

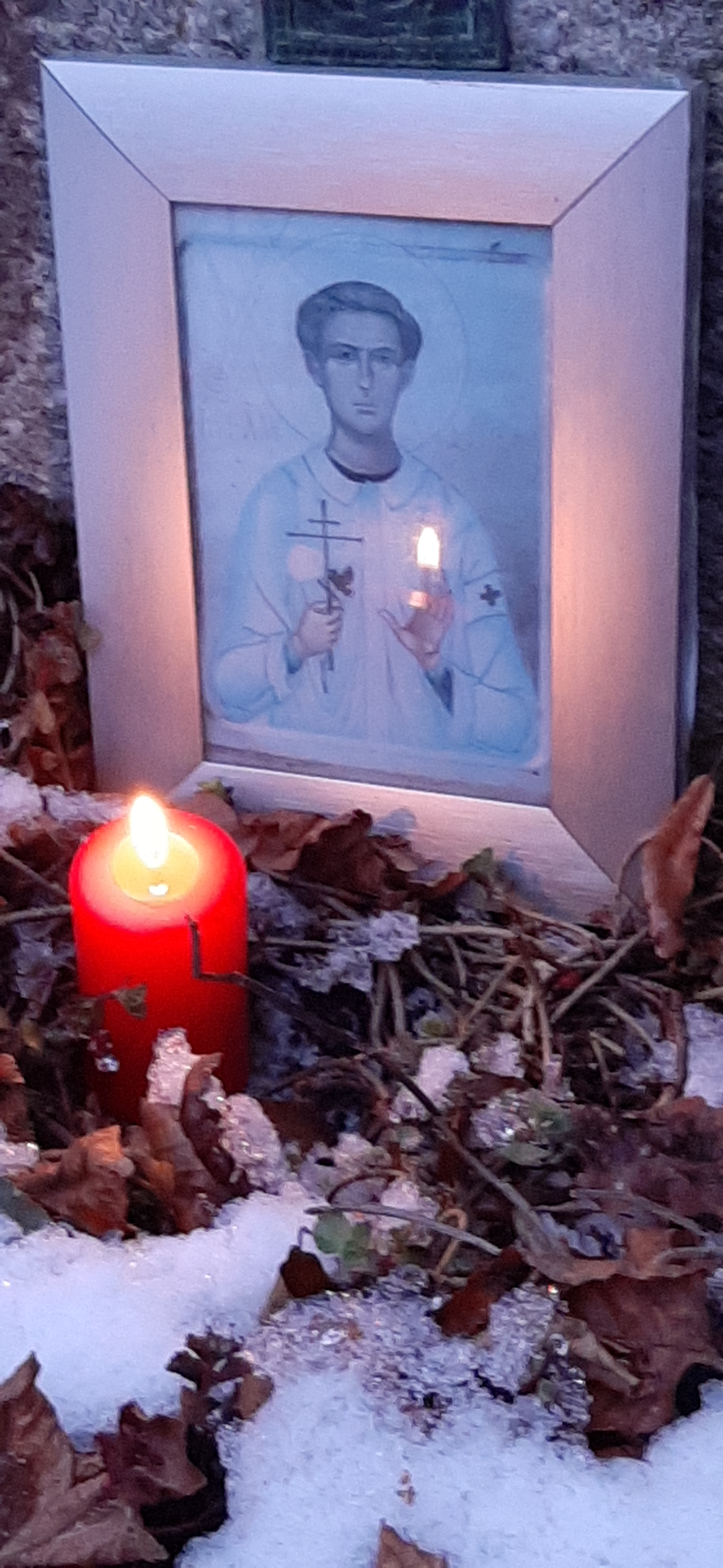
Icon of New Martyr Alexander Schmorell of Munich at his grave.

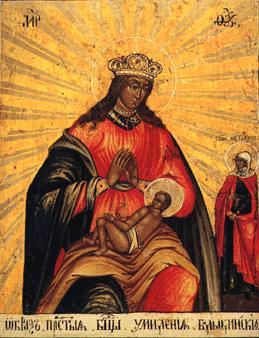
Icon of the Mother of God of Balikin.

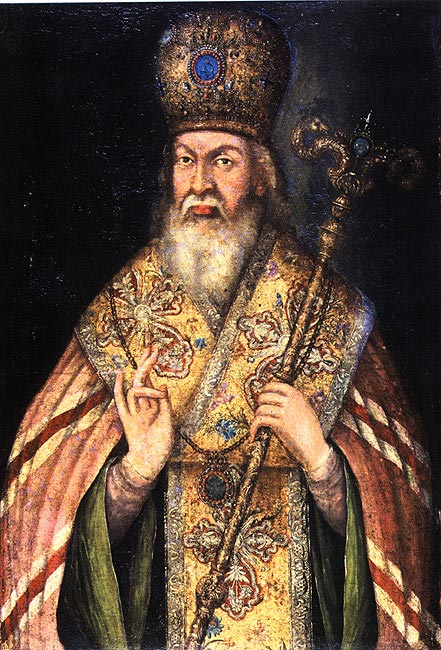
St. Sophronius, Bishop of Irkutsk.

== Sources ==
- June 30/July 13. Orthodox Calendar (PRAVOSLAVIE.RU).
- July 13 / June 30. HOLY TRINITY RUSSIAN ORTHODOX CHURCH (A parish of the Patriarchate of Moscow).
- June 30. OCA - The Lives of the Saints.
- June 30. The Year of Our Salvation - Holy Transfiguration Monastery, Brookline, Massachusetts.
- The Autonomous Orthodox Metropolia of Western Europe and the Americas (ROCOR). St. Hilarion Calendar of Saints for the year of our Lord 2004. St. Hilarion Press (Austin, TX). p. 48.
- The Thirtieth Day of the Month of June. Orthodoxy in China.
- June 30. Latin Saints of the Orthodox Patriarchate of Rome.
- The Roman Martyrology. Transl. by the Archbishop of Baltimore. Last Edition, According to the Copy Printed at Rome in 1914. Revised Edition, with the Imprimatur of His Eminence Cardinal Gibbons. Baltimore: John Murphy Company, 1916. pp. 189–190.
- Rev. Richard Stanton. A Menology of England and Wales, or, Brief Memorials of the Ancient British and English Saints Arranged According to the Calendar, Together with the Martyrs of the 16th and 17th Centuries. London: Burns & Oates, 1892. pp. 294–296.

Greek Sources

- Great Synaxaristes: (in Greek) 30 ΙΟΥΝΙΟΥ. ΜΕΓΑΣ ΣΥΝΑΞΑΡΙΣΤΗΣ.
- (in Greek) Συναξαριστής. 30 Ιουνίου. ECCLESIA.GR. (H ΕΚΚΛΗΣΙΑ ΤΗΣ ΕΛΛΑΔΟΣ).
- (in Greek) 30 Ιουνίου. Αποστολική Διακονία της Εκκλησίας της Ελλάδος (Apostoliki Diakonia of the Church of Greece).
- (in Greek) 30/06/2018. Ορθόδοξος Συναξαριστής.

Russian Sources

- (in Russian) 13 июля (30 июня). Православная Энциклопедия под редакцией Патриарха Московского и всея Руси Кирилла (электронная версия). (Orthodox Encyclopedia - Pravenc.ru).
- (in Russian) 30 июня по старому стилю / 13 июля по новому стилю. Русская Православная Церковь - Православный церковный календарь на 2017 год.
- (in Russian) 30 июня (ст.ст.) 13 июля 2014 (нов. ст.). Русская Православная Церковь Отдел внешних церковных связей. (DECR).
