= Santi Protomartiri a Via Aurelia Antica =

Catholic titular church in Rome

- Church of the Holy Protomartyrs on the Old Aurelian Way
- Chiesa dei Santi Protomartiri Romani
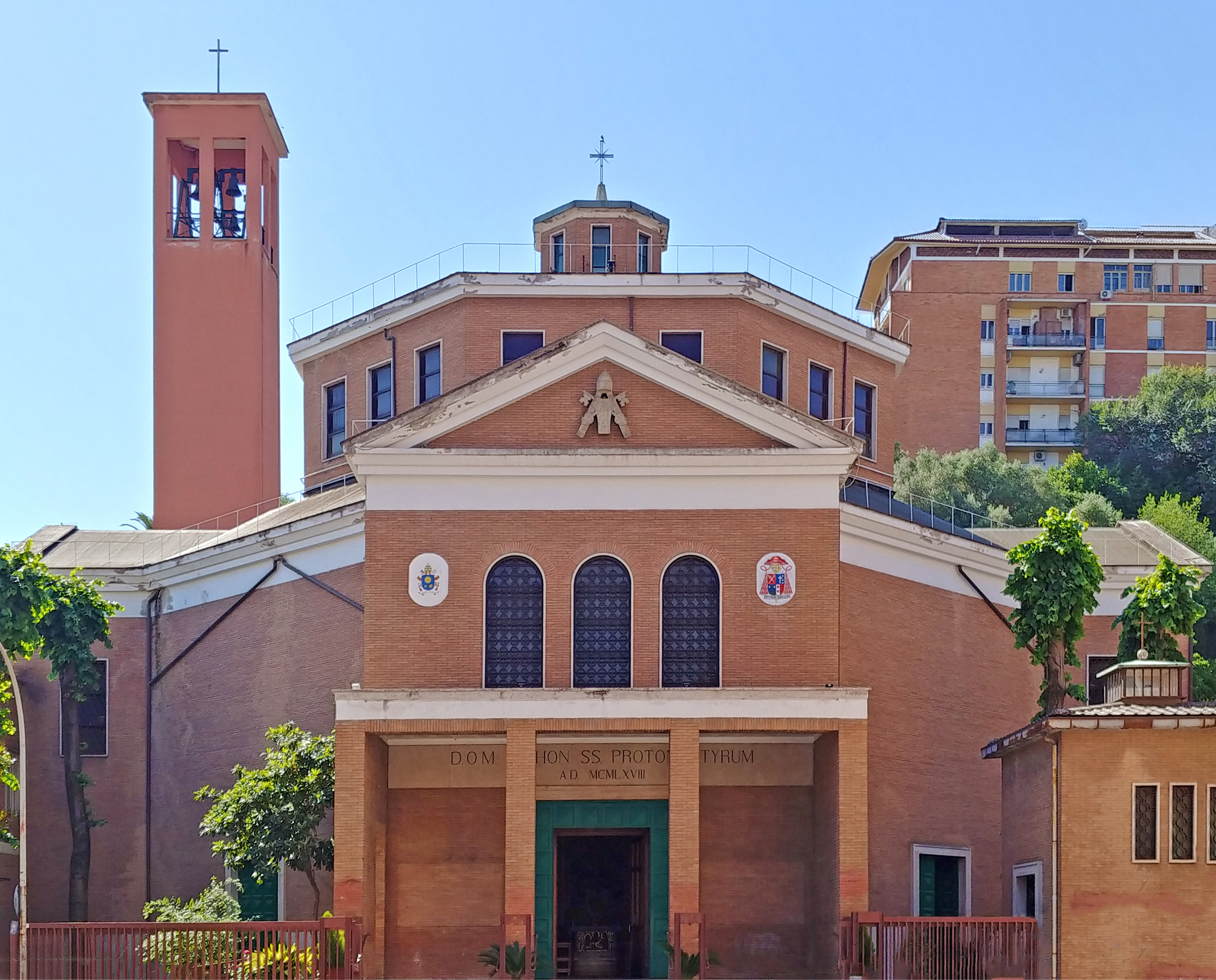
- Facade
- Click on the map for a fullscreen view
- 41°53′41″N 12°26′29″E
- Location: Via Angelo di Pietro 50, Q. Aurelio, Rome
- Country: Italy
- Language: Italian
- Denomination: Catholic Church
- Tradition: Roman Rite
- Website: santiprotomartiriromani.wordpress.com

History
- Status: titular church
- Dedication: First Martyrs of the Church of Rome
- Consecrated: 1968

Architecture
- Architect: Francesco Fornari
- Architectural type: Romanesque Revival
- Groundbreaking: 1968
- Completed: 1968

Administration
- Diocese: Rome

Santi Protomartiri a Via Aurelia Antica is a 20th-century parochial church and titular church in western Rome, dedicated to the First Martyrs of the Church of Rome (died AD 64–67).

== History ==
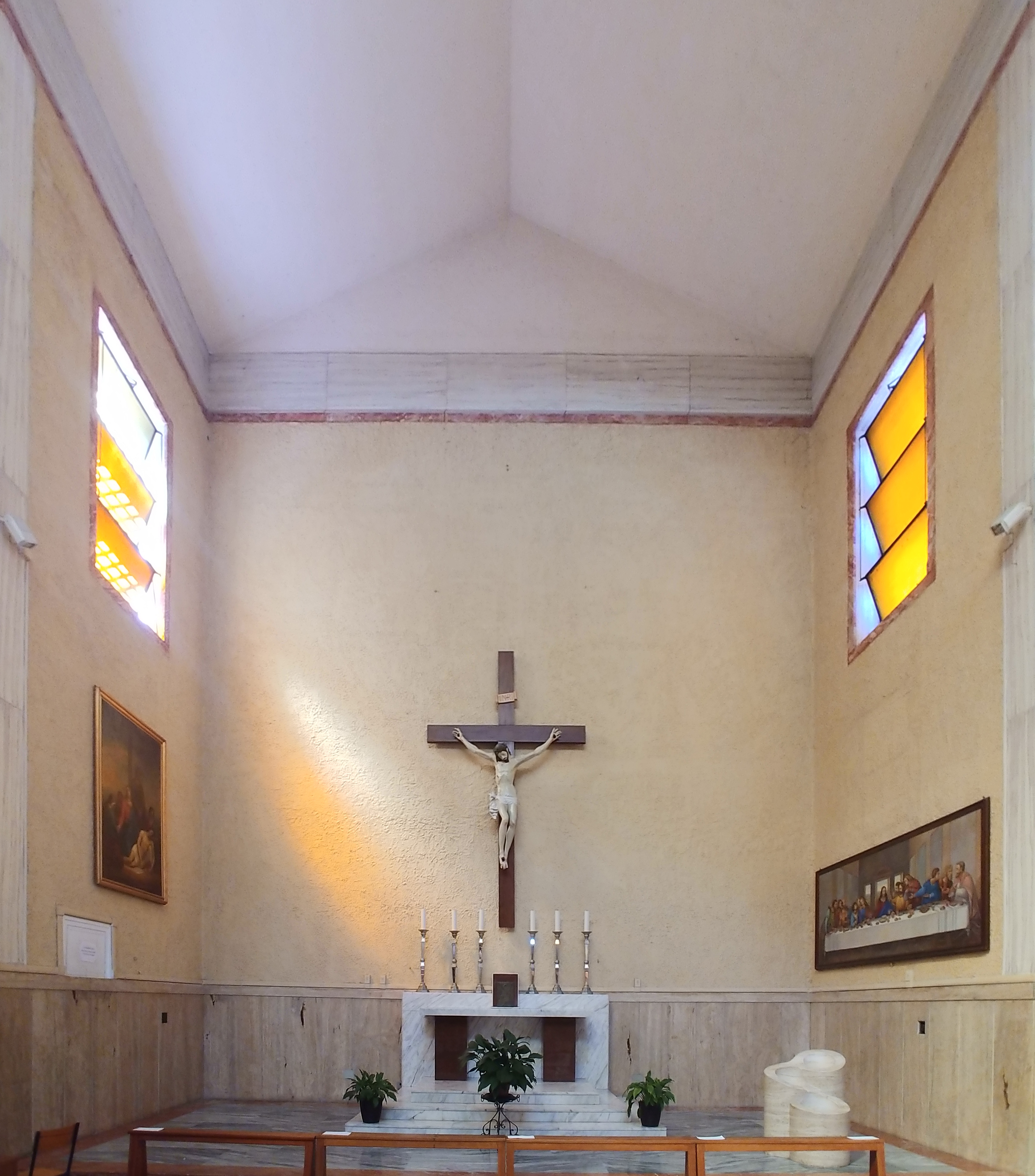
Side chapel with baptismal font

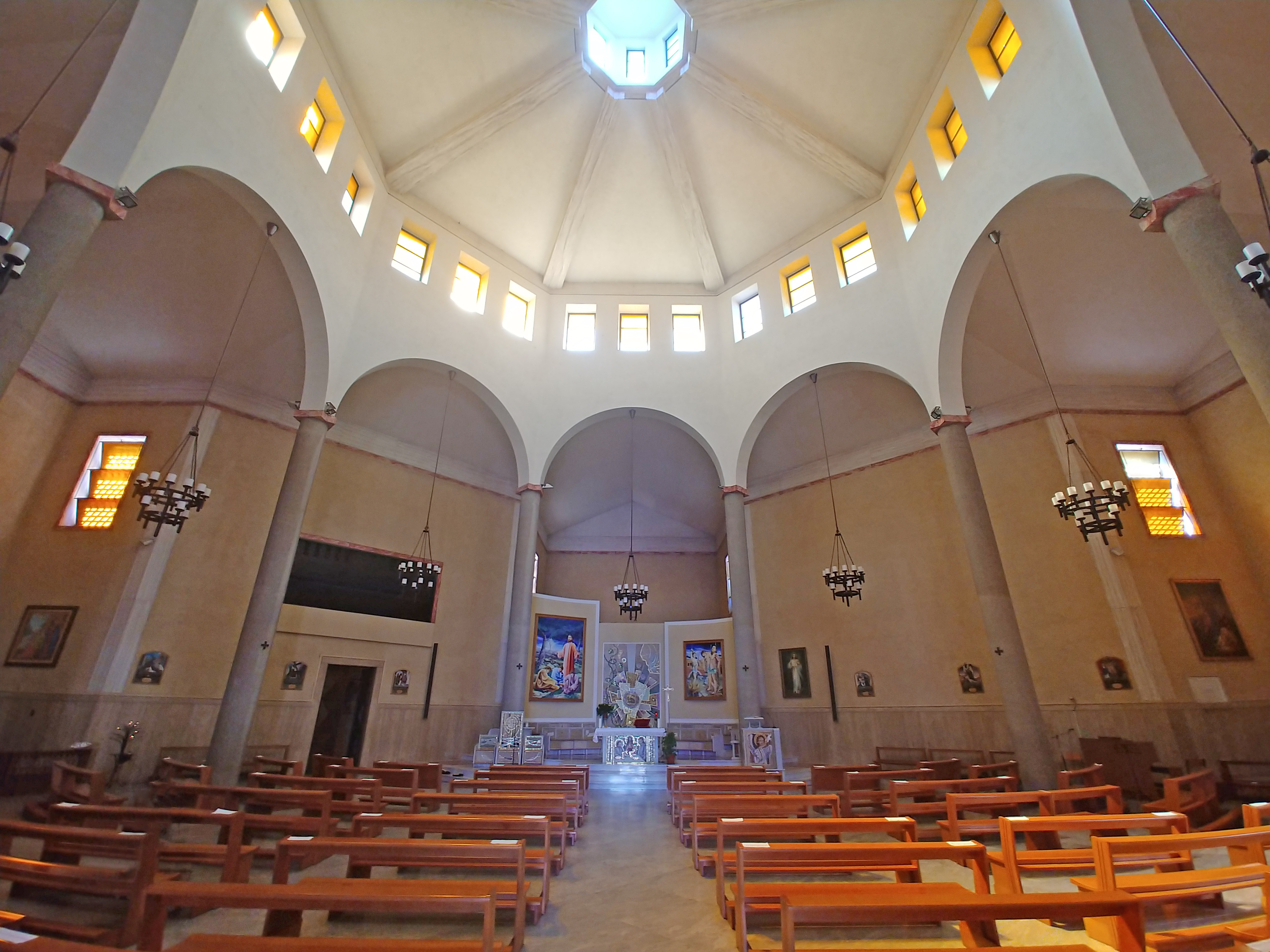
Nave, dome, and main altar

Built in 1968, it was made a titular church to be held by a cardinal-priest on 30 April 1969. In 1985, Pope John Paul II visited this church.

Cardinal-protectors

- Joseph Malula (1969–1989)
- Henri Schwery (1991–2021)
- Anthony Poola (2022–present)
