= Public holidays in Sudan =

This is a list of holidays in Sudan.

The following public holidays are the same every year:

- January 1: Independence Day
- January 7: Coptic Christmas
- December 25: Christmas Day

Variable (Islamic holidays are fixed to the Islamic calendar which follows the phases of the moon, therefore holidays will be 10 to 11 days earlier in the Gregorian calendar every year. Furthermore, Islamic holidays depend on the sighting of the moon.)

- Coptic Easter
- The Prophet's Birthday
- Eid al-Fitr
- Islamic New Year
- Eid al-Adha
