= Gervasios Paraskevopoulos =

Greek Orthodox saint (1877–1964)

Saint Gervasios of Patras
- Born: 1877
- Died: 30 June 1964 (aged 87)
- Venerated in: Eastern Orthodox Church
- Canonized: 16 November 2023 by Bartholomew I of Constantinople

Gervasios Paraskevopoulos (Greek: Γερβάσιος Παρασκευόπουλος), known as Saint Gervasios of Patras (1877 – 30 June 1964) was a Greek priest, theologian and monk. In 2023, he was proclaimed a saint of the Orthodox Church.

== Biography ==
Gervasios lived and worked in the city of Patras for much of his life. He was born in 1877 in the village of Nymfasia (Kernitsa) in Arcadia. In 1891 at the age of 14, in a first contact with monasticism, he entered the Holy Monastery of the Dormition of the Virgin Mary of Kernitsa. In 1897 he joined as a monk in the Holy Monastery of the Dormition of the Holy Monastery of Gerokomeio of Patras. In 1899 he served his military service. In 1904 he was ordained deacon of the Holy Archdiocese of Patras. In 1905 he entered the higher ecclesiastical Rizarios School of Athens, with Nektarios of Aegina as director of the school, who foresaw the important future ecclesiastical role of Gervasios. In 1910, he was ordained a priest of the Metropolis of Patras. In 1912, he served as a military priest in the Balkan Wars. In 1914 declared Doctor of Theology at the Theological School of the University of Athens. In 1915, he taught theology at Syros High School. In 1916 elected Abbot of the Monastery of Girokomeio of Patras. In 1919, appointed as a parish priest at the Church of Agios Dimitrios in Patras. In 1923 founded the first Catechetical Schools in Greece. Ιn 1938, appointed Protosynkellos of the Archdiocese of Athens. In 1946, he established a camp in the area of Profitis Ilias Monastery of Patras. In 1950 established a camp in the area of Sychaina of Patras and the Reconstructive School for Women of Patras. In 1963, a cross has founded in a pine tree that he had planted in 1929. Gervasios died on 30 June 1964, aged 87.

== Legacy ==
Gervasios left a very positive memory to those who knew him according to their testimonies:

the sanctified spiritual father and Preacher of Patras, the fervent teacher of the divine Dogmas of the Church, the God-loving, Saint-loving and People-loving, the Priest of the poor and refugees, the nurturer of widows and orphans, the founder of the first Catechetical School in Greece, the student of Saint Nektarios, the grandfather of the people of Patras, Venerable Gervasios Paraskevopoulos, the renowned and sign-bearing Priest, the beloved of the people, the zealous and ardent worker of the Lord's Vineyard.

— Mystagogy Resource Center

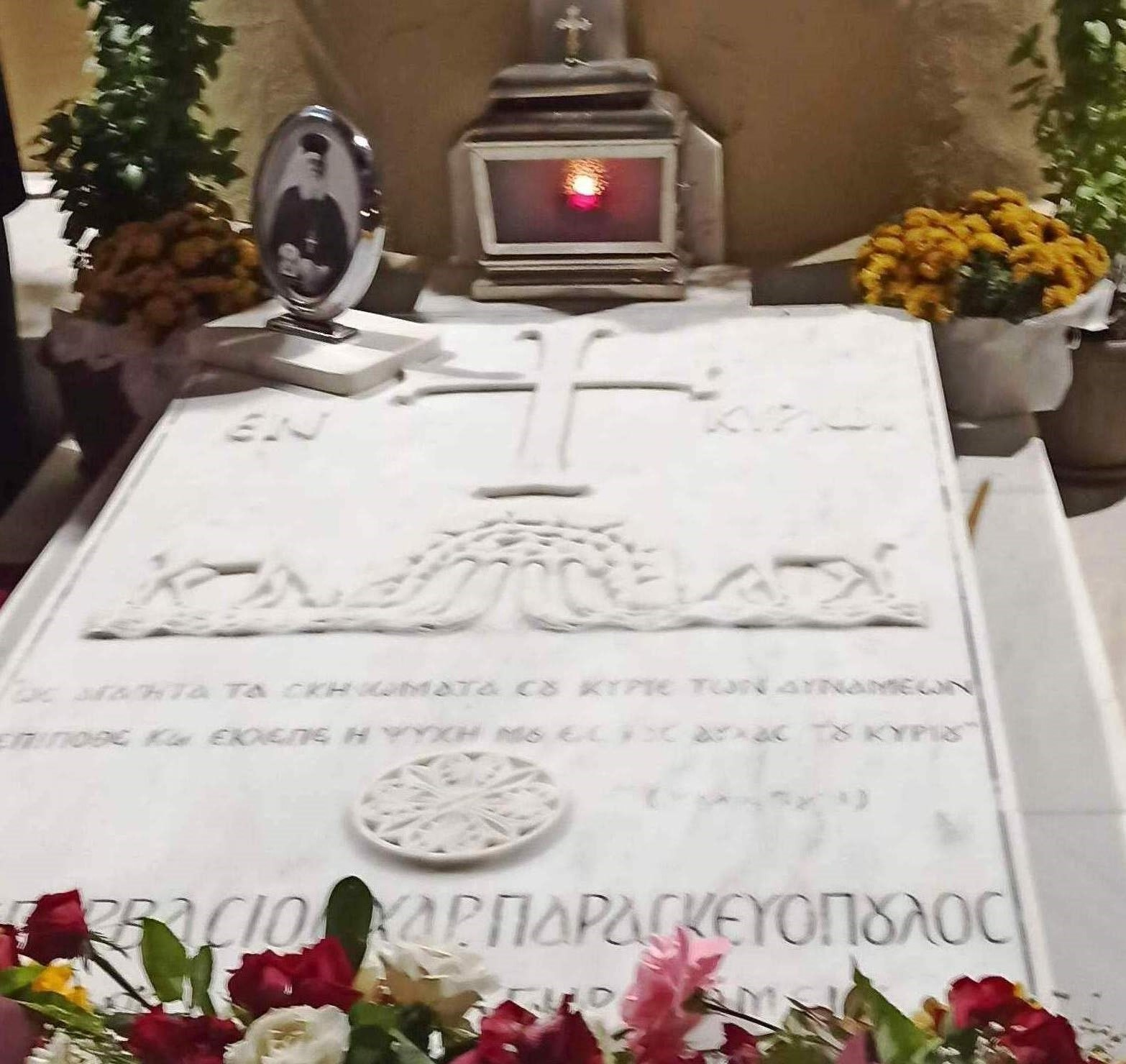
Tomb of Gervasios Paraskevopoulos

Miracles attributed to Gervasios include the appearance in 1963 of a cross in a pine tree planted by him and schoolchildren with whom he was working in 1929.

On 29 June 2014, the reburial of his relics took place by Metropolitan Chrysostomos of Patras. Gervasios was proposed as a saint by the Church of Greece and Metropolitan Chrysostomos of Patras in August 2019. On 16 November 2023, the Holy Synod of the Ecumenical Patriarchate of Constantinople, under the presidency of Patriarch Bartholomew I, officially proclaimed Gervasios's sainthood with the emphasis in the Patriarchal announcement that he has been engraved from the beginning as a saint in the consciousness of the People. On the same day, 16 November 2023, the first ecclesiastical service in honour and memory of Saint Gervasios took place in Patras. The feast of the memory of Saint Gervasius of Patras was set for 30 June.

On 18 December 2023, at the Patriarchal Church of Saint George became the ceremony of the signing of the Patriarchal and Synodal Act of the inclusion of three new Saints in the Church's Calendar: Monk Gavrielia (Papagianni), Hieromonk Athanasios Hamakiotis, and Archimandrite Gervasios Paraskevopoulos.

Every year, on 30 June, the anniversary of the death of Gervasios, events in his honor and memory are held in the city of Patras and in the camps of the Anaplastiki School in Sychaina where his tomb is located, on the initiative of the Holy Metropolis of Patras. The feast of the memory of Saint Gervasius of Patras was set for 30 June.

On Saturday, 8 June 2024, the first Holy Church in honor of Agios Gervasios, of Patras, in the town of Chalandritsa in Achaia, was inaugurated by the Metropolitan of Patras Mr. Chrysostomos.
