= Girokomeio Monastery =

- Μονή Γηροκομείου
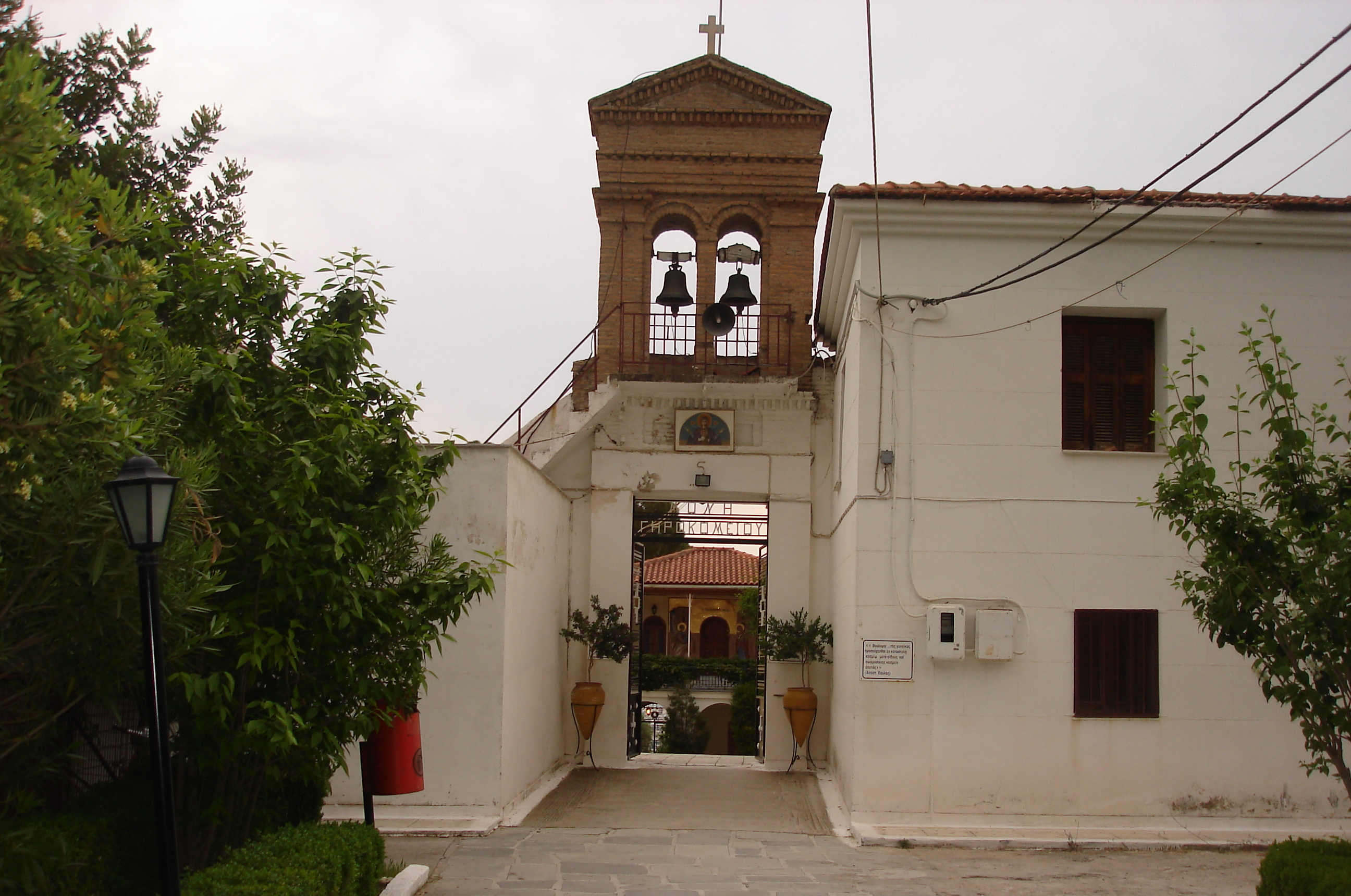

Monastery information
- Other names: Monastery of Panagia Girokomitissa
- Established: 10th century
- Dedicated to: Dormition of Theotokos
- Celebration date: August 15 & 23; Easter Tuesday
- Diocese: Metropolis of Patras

Site
- Location: Girokomeio, Patras
- Country: Greece
- Coordinates: 38°14′10″N 21°45′53″E

The Girokomeio Monastery (Greek: Μονή Γηροκομείου) or Monastery of Panagia Girokomitissa is an Congregational Monastery that belongs to the Holy Diocese of Patras and is located in the area of the southeast Girokomeio of Patras.

== History ==
The Holy Monastery of Girokomeio is one of the oldest monasteries in Greece. It was founded around the 10th century, that is when monasticism appeared in mainland Greece. Its name is due to the fact that, on the site where the Monastery was founded, there used to be a nursing home that also had a church, or according to others, that when the monks founded the monastery they built and maintained a nursing home at the same time, something that was not unknown for the monasteries of the Byzantine era. But an old tradition, accepted by the historian S. Thomopoulos, connects the foundation and the name of the Monastery with Saint Artemios, the transfer of the Holy Relic of Saint Andrew to Constantinople and the aqueduct of Patras.

In the place where the Monastery is built, during the pre-Christian era there was a pagan temple, probably of the goddess Artemis. On the wall of the north wing of the Monastery (outside the monks' cells) there is a built-in part of the Ionic style capital of the pre-Christian church.

In 1204, the year in which Patras was captured by the Franks, it was in great prosperity, which is why the various holy war orders of the West fought over its capture. When the fathers of the Monastery were forced by the conquering Franks to choose between obedience to the Pope of Rome and exile, they laudably preferred the latter.

During the period of the Turkish occupation, it was the seat of the Metropolitan of Patras. The Monastery was set on fire by the Turkalvans on Great Friday of 1770 (April 13) during Orlofika and Palm Sunday of 1821 (April 3). During the period of the National Rebellion, it became the scene of many battles. Crucial for the outcome of the 1821 War was the battle won in the area of the Monastery (Battle of the Nursing Home), on March 2, 1822, by Th. Kolokotronis, which was justly attributed to a miracle of the "Our Lady of the Girokomeio".

In 1943, the Monks were expelled from the Monastery and went into exile for a year in Paleomonastir (Monastery of Saint Nicholas Bala), where they moved with emotion the Holy Icon of the "Old Countess" and the Holy Relics of the Saints. The procession was preceded by Saint Gervasios of Patras who was a monk and abbot of the Monastery of Girokomeio. The Monastery was for a long time Patriarchal and Stavropigian.

The Holy Monastery of Girokomeio celebrates in August 15, secondarily Easter Tuesday and August 23rd.

== Sources ==
- Τσελίκας, Αγαμέμνων (2000). "Τα δικαιοπρακτικά έγγραφα των μοναστηριών Ομπλού, Χρυσοποδαριτίσσης, Αγίων Πάντων και Γηροκομείου Πατρών (1712-1855)". Δελτίο του Ιστορικού και Παλαιογραφικού Αρχείου. 9. Αθήνα: Μ.Ι.Ε.Τ. ISSN 1108-6068.
- "Ε.Ε.Τ.Α.Α. - Διοικητικές μεταβολές Μονής Γηροκομείου". eetaa.gr.
- "Ιερά Μονή Γηροκομείου". Ἱερά Μητρόπολις Πατρῶν. 2016-08-09. Archived from the original on 2016-08-09.
- "Μοναστήρια". nea.gr. 2006-05-09. Archived from the original on 2006-05-09.
