= Andrew Hedgman =

New Zealand ultramarathon runner

- Born: 30 June 1987 (age 39); Thames, New Zealand
- Years active: 2003–present
- Known for: Ultramarathon running
- Notable work: Raising Funds for the Charity WSPA
- Website: http://www.andrewhedgman.com

Andrew Hedgman is a New Zealand born ultramarathon runner who resides in Brisbane, Australia. He is also a licensed Skydiver and Scuba diver.

== Early life ==
Andrew was born on 30 June 1987; he grew up in the town of Paeroa in New Zealand. He has three siblings, two older brothers and one younger brother. He attended Paeroa College until the age of 18 which is when he moved away of his town.

== Running ==
Andrew began running at his high school in Paeroa College. He found himself breaking school records and as an intermediate was running against the seniors and beating them. It wasn't until his P.E Teacher Ava Meek challenged him to run an entire Marathon when Hedgman found his passion for long distance running.

Between 2003 and 2009 Andrew ran various Marathons and Half Marathons. He often would gain top three positions for the Half Marathon for the under 20s.

In 2009 Andrew ran his first Ultramarathon in Taupō, New Zealand. The 100 km New Zealand nationals, gaining a top ten position in a time of 10 hours 40 minutes and 52 seconds.

In February and March 2010 Hedgman ran the entire length of New Zealand in which he completed in only 28 days. Averaging 50 miles per day, battling shin splints, a torn muscle, extreme weather with having only one rest day.

In 2012 Andrew ran 1000 km from Brisbane to Sydney in Australia. He also was invited to take part in the Lycian Way Ultramarathon in Turkey where he gained a top 10 position. Other notable races Hedgman has completed include the Kalahari Augrabies Extreme Marathon in South Africa and the Larapinta Trail Ultramarathon in Australia, both multi day races where he placed in the top 10.

Andrew can often be seen running the trails throughout South-East Queensland in preparation for his next major events.

== WSPA and the Brisbane to Sydney Run ==
In September 2011 Andrew ran 200 kilometers in Queensland, Australia to help raise money for the charity, WSPA. This was the first time Andrew had used his running to fundraise for charity.

From 16 to 30 June 2012 Andrew ran 1000 km from Brisbane to Sydney to once again raise money and awareness for WSPA. Andrew noted on his online fundraising page that the Brisbane to Sydney run "is the most satisfying run that I have ever done in my life".

== Writing ==
Hedgman is currently writing a book about his New Zealand run among other adventures. He often writes articles for different sports magazines in Australia and New Zealand.
