= First Martyrs of the Church of Rome =

Christians martyred in 64

The First Martyrs of the Church of Rome were martyred Christians in the city of Rome during Nero's persecution in 64. The event is recorded by both Tacitus and Pope Clement I, among others. They are celebrated in the Catholic Church as an optional memorial on 30 June. The Orthodox Church celebrates them on 30 June in its liturgical calendar as pre-1054 East-West Schism Western saints.

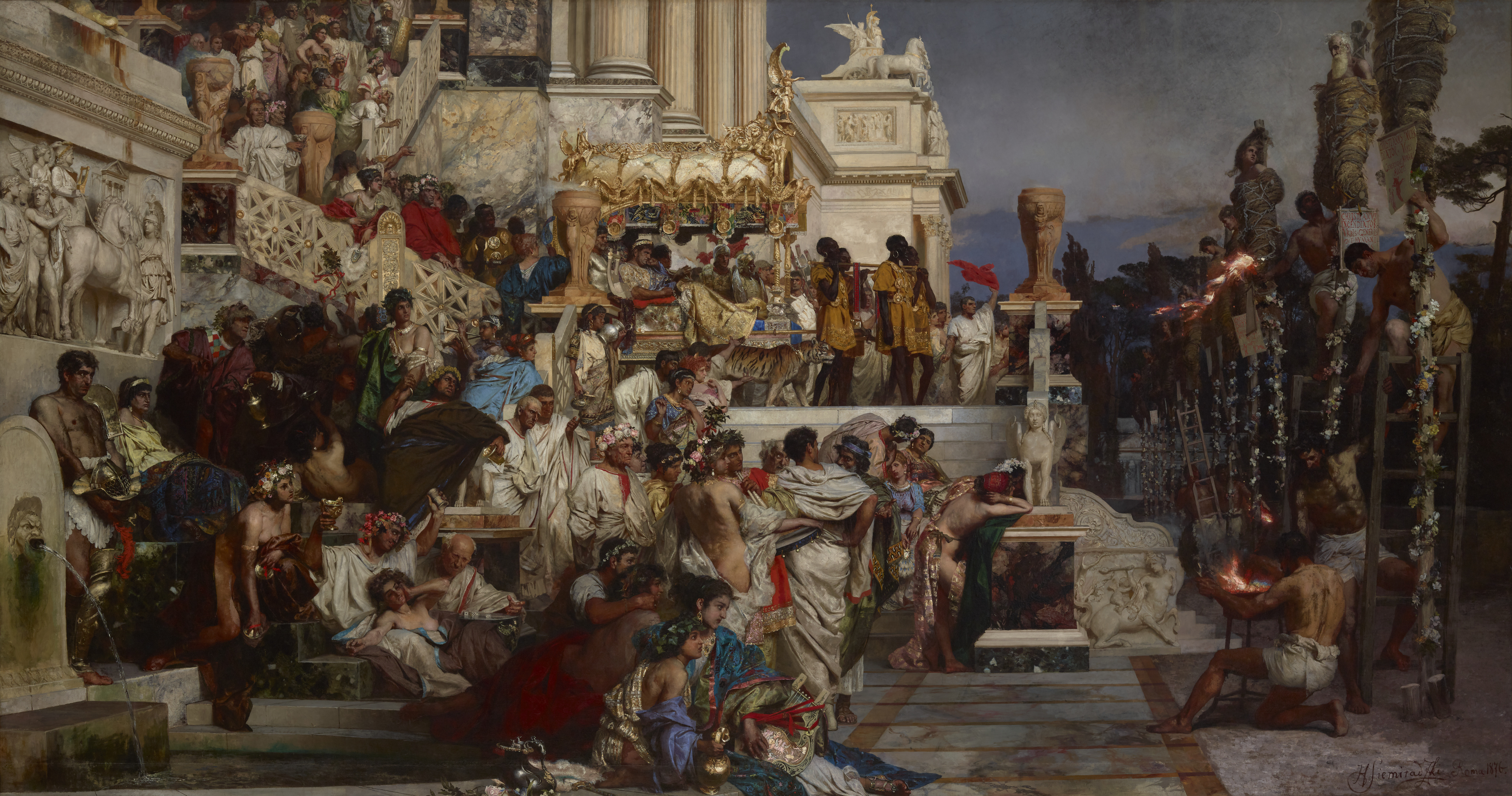
Nero's Torches, Henryk Siemiradzki, 1876

== Background ==
Rome had a large Jewish population. The couple, Priscilla and Aquila, were tent makers from Pontus, whom Paul met in Corinth. They had lived in Rome until the emperor Claudius ordered all the Jews to leave the city. Suetonius mentions this as due to disturbances in the city between the Jews and the followers of "Christus". Claudius died in 54 AD.

There were early Christians in Rome within a dozen or so years after the death of Jesus, though they were not the converts of Paul. He had not yet visited them at the time he wrote his Epistle to the Romans in 57-58 AD. Paul wrote to a community of both Jews and Gentiles.

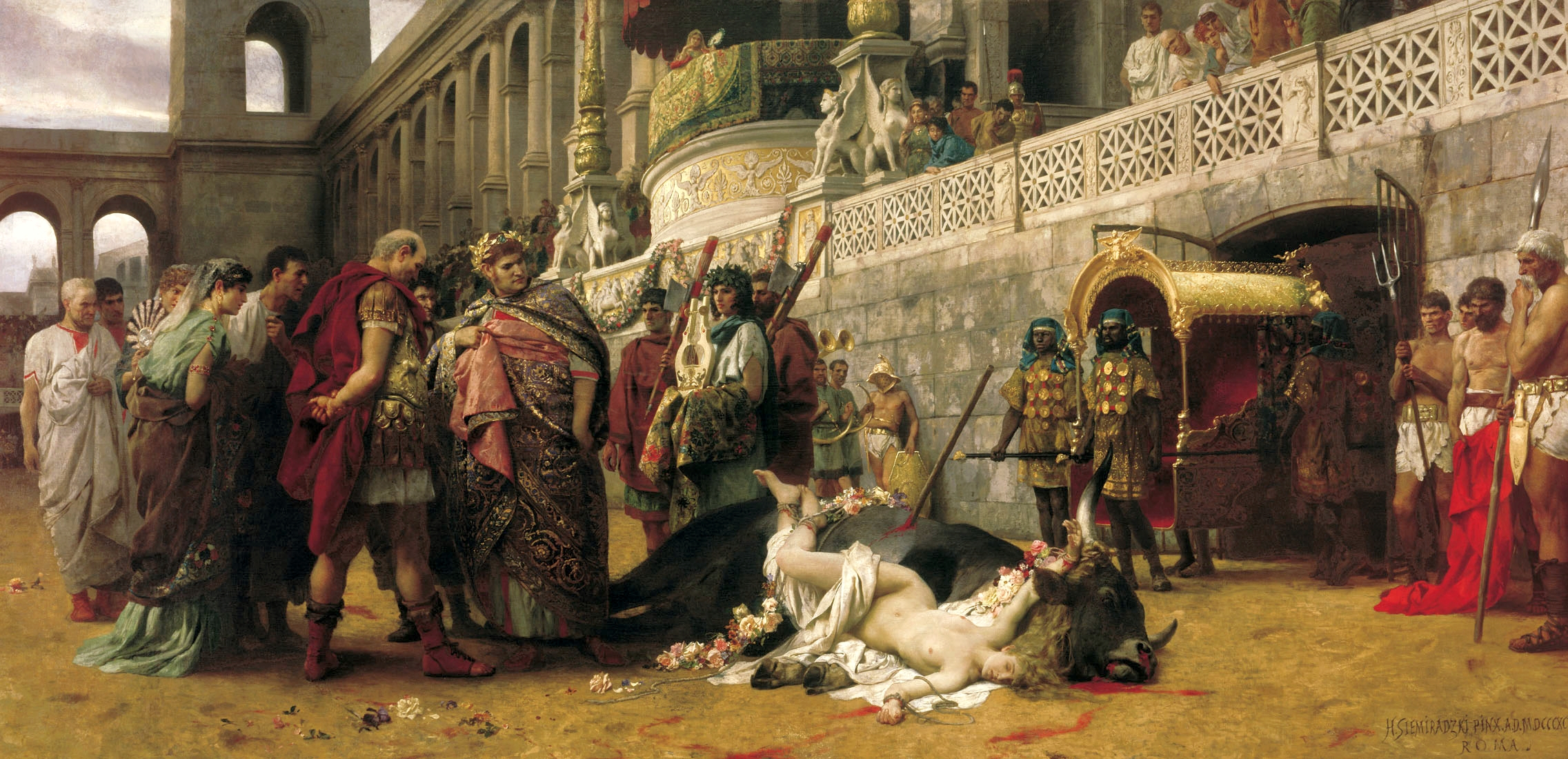
"Christian Dirce", Henryk Siemiradzki, 1897

== History ==
In July of 64 AD, Rome was devastated by fire. Largely made up of wooden tenements, fire was a frequent occurrence in the city. Rumor blamed the tragedy on the unpopular emperor Nero, who wanted to enlarge his palace. He accused the Christians. According to the historian Tacitus, many Christians were put to death "not so much of the crime of firing the city, as of hatred against mankind."

Covered with the skins of beasts, they were torn by dogs and perished, or were nailed to crosses, or were doomed to the flames and burnt, to serve as a nightly illumination, when daylight had expired. Nero offered his gardens for the spectacle, and was exhibiting a show in the circus, while he mingled with the people in the dress of a charioteer or stood aloft on a car. Hence, even for criminals who deserved extreme and exemplary punishment, there arose a feeling of compassion; for it was not, as it seemed, for the public good, but to glut one man's cruelty, that they were being destroyed.

Peter and Paul were probably among the victims.

== Veneration ==
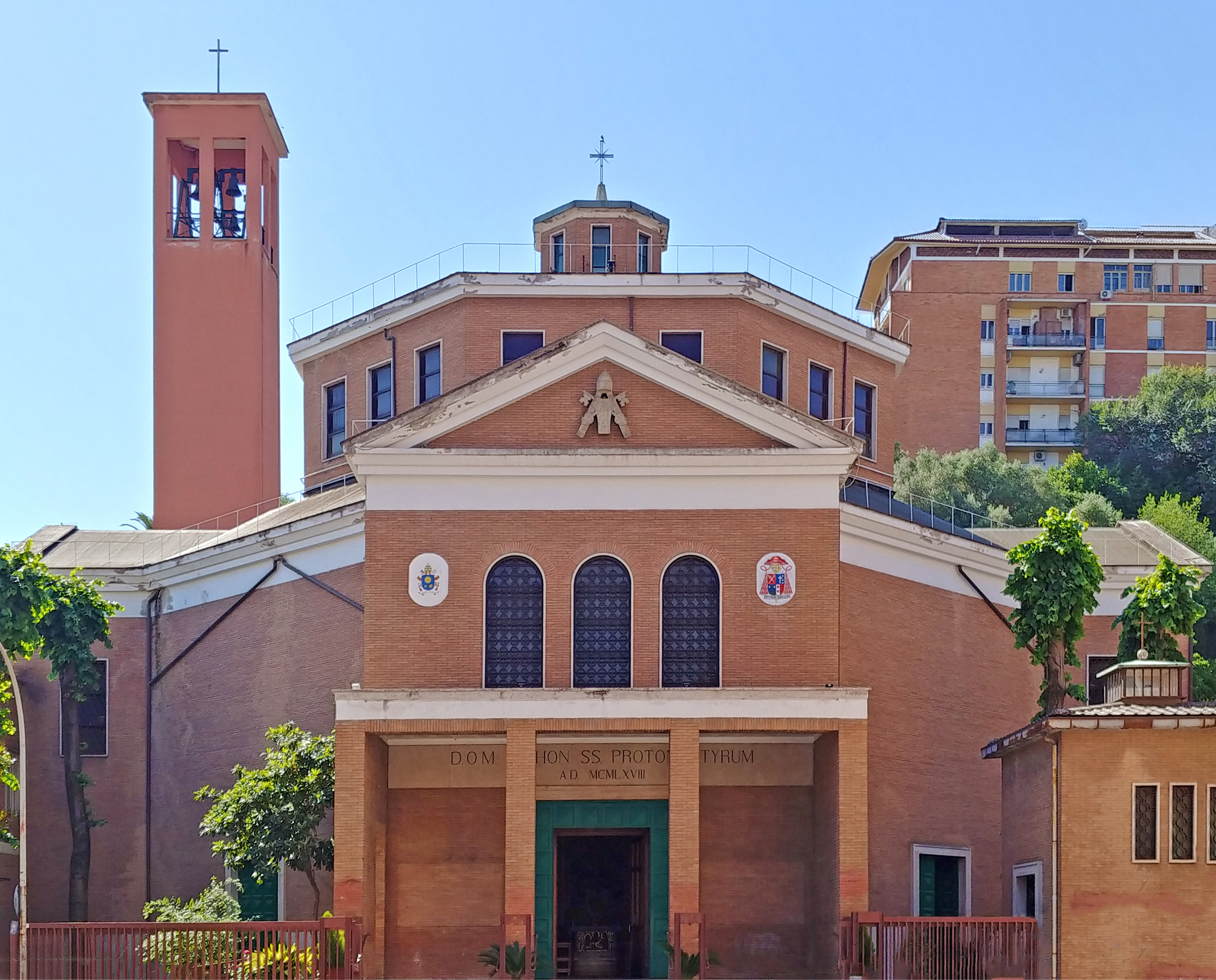
Santi Protomartiri a Via Aurelia Antica, Rome

This feast first came into the General Roman Calendar in the 1969 calendar reforms. The intention of the feast is to give a general celebration of early Roman martyrs. Prior to the calendar reforms, there were dozens of relatively minor Roman martyrs celebrated or commemorated in the calendar. Several of these had scant historical evidence, but did benefit from immemorial tradition. This feast is a replacement for the many Roman martyr feasts, whose absence allowed for a less cluttered and more "dies natale" based sanctoral calendar of more major saints. It also permitted the greater celebration of ferias, partially enacting the Second Vatican Council's call for the Proper of Time to take a greater precedence. All of the early Roman martyrs retain their place in the Martyrology and can be celebrated in local calendars or privately unless impeded by a greater observance.

The placement of the feast is directly after the Solemnity of SS Peter and Paul, who are the principal patron saints of Rome. The subsequent martyrs are associated with this patronage. The feast day was formerly occupied with a Commemoration of St. Paul, and fell in the Octave of SS Peter and Paul.

The church of Santi Protomartiri a Via Aurelia Antica in Rome is dedicated to these first martyrs.

== See also ==
- Persecution of Christians in the Roman Empire
