= Erentrude =

Roman Catholic saint (died 718)

Saint Erentrude
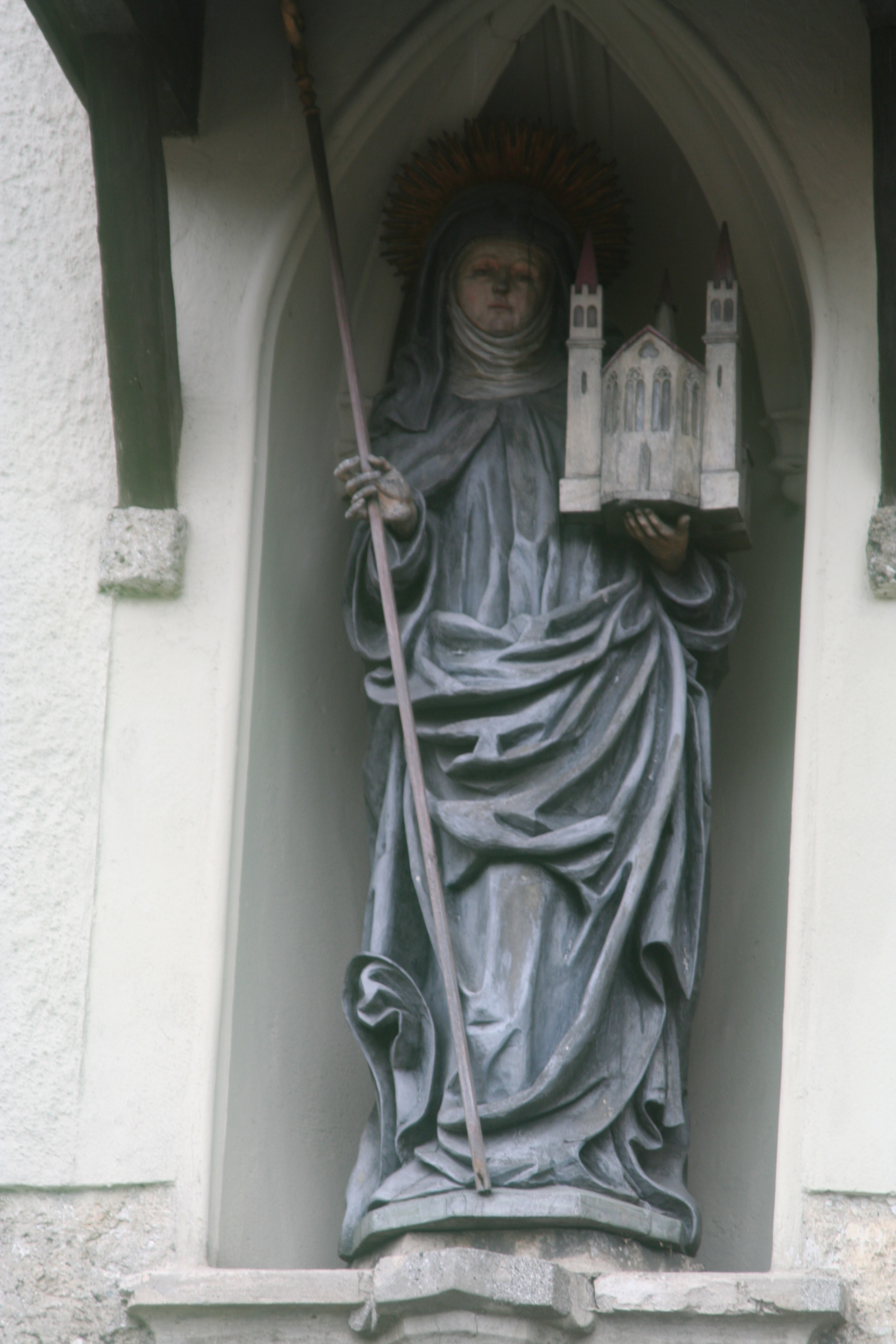
- Statue of Erentrude at Nonnberg Abbey

Nun
- Born: late 7th century
- Died: 30 June 718; Salzburg, Germany
- Venerated in: Catholic Church; Eastern Orthodox Church
- Feast: 30 June

Erentrude (also known as Ehrentraud, Erendrudis, Erentruy, Erndrude, Arentruda, Ariotruda and Arndruda) was a saint and abbess, born during the end of the 7th century, probably in present-day Germany or Austria. She was born into a Franconian-Merovingian royal house, and was the niece of Rupert of Salzburg. She left her home country to assist Rupert in establishing religious communities in Salzburg; in about 700, he built a convent, Nonnberg Abbey, and installed her as its first abbess. She and the nuns at Nonnberg served the poor, needy, and ill, striking a balance between living as cloistered nuns and engaging in charitable works. Erentrude died on 30 June 718. Her fame for healing miracles and intercession grew after her death, and many legends have arisen throughout the centuries since her death. In 2006, Erentrude's image appeared on the Austrian Nonnberg Abbey commemorative coin. Her feast day is celebrated on 30 June.

== Life and ministry ==
Erentrude was born at the end of the 7th century, probably in present-day Germany or Austria. The exact date and place of her birth are unknown, and little evidence about her life exists. She was from a Franconian-Merovingian royal house; one early legend states that she was born and raised in Franconia. Hagiographer Agnes Dunbar states that Erentrude lived in Worms and "was consecrated to God from her childhood". The duchess Regintrudis, wife of Thedo and a Franconian princess, was a nun at Nonnberg Abbey, the convent where Erentrude was abbess, and might have been related to her. Erentrude was the fraternal niece of Rupert of Salzburg, although hagiographer Alban Butler reports that she might have been his sister. Much of what is known about Erentrude comes from Rupert. The first biographical sketch about her was written by Caesarius, a chaplain at Nonnberg Abbey at the beginning of the 14th century, at the direction of the bishop at the time; his sources were the oldest nuns at the convent and the people in the area. According to writer Linda Kulzer, Caesarius "sketches a thoroughly loving and attractive image of Erentrude ... which is the foundation of what is now the common office of the saint".

Erentrude received her education at the convent of St. Radegund in Poitiers, where she had entered to become a nun. Rupert, after preaching and founding churches for several years in Bavaria, returned to his home town of Worms, where Erentrude was serving as an abbess, to elicit assistance in his work from "devoted men and women". According to Kulzer, Erentrude experienced conflict at Worms, which strengthened her character and increased her desire for "mystical contemplation". She left her home country to help Rupert start religious communities in Salzburg; he built a convent, Nonnberg Abbey, near Salzburg in about 700, and installed her as its first abbess. Nonnberg Abbey, which was featured in the 1965 movie musical The Sound of Music, is the oldest Benedictine woman's community in what was then part of Germany. Several nuns from Worms might have come with her to Nonnberg. She taught them and the other nuns under her care "with all gentleness and wisdom".

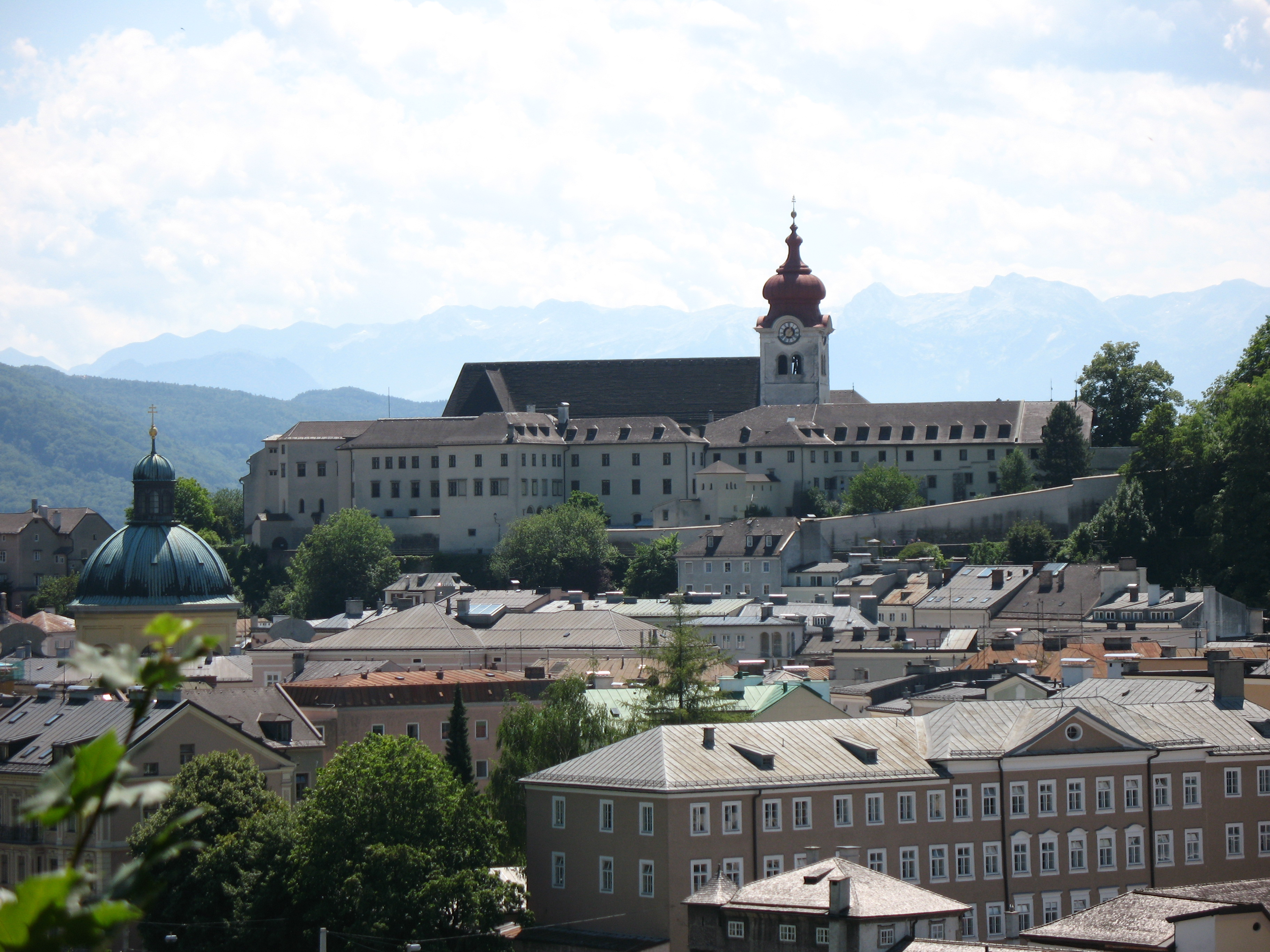
Nonnberg Abbey viewed from Kapuziner Hill, Salzburg, Austria

Caesarius' biographical sketch describes the work Erentrude and her nuns conducted at Nonnberg, which, as Kulzer states, went beyond the typical prayer and devotion of nuns at the time but was typical for Merovingian women who lived as cloistered nuns. Erentrude and the nuns at Nonnberg worked with the poor and the ill, which was the purpose and focus of their monastic existence, not self denial and humility characteristic of monastic life in later eras, and struck a balance between charitable works and contemplative ways of life. Kulzer reported that the wealth of convents during this era was distributed to the poor people who came to their doors daily, so the rules of claustration never prevented the nuns who lived there to minister to the poor and needy. Caesarius "praised [Erentrude's] great love for children", which she taught to the nuns at Nonnberg, and described her careful direction of her nuns and the young women under her care; by her example and instruction, trained them "to great piety" and "guided [them] with all gentleness and wisdom".

== Death and legacy ==
According to Caesarius, in approximately early 718, St. Rupert, aware of his imminent death, requested that Erentrude visit him; when he told her, asking that she not tell anyone and that she would continue to pray for him, she asked that she die before him. When he rebuked her, she reminded him that she had left her home to follow him to Salzberg, so he agreed to intercede for her to join him after he died. Shortly after Rupert died in March 718, Caesarius reported that Erentrude, while interceding for him, saw a vision of him telling her it was time for her to die, and she died three months after he did, on 30 June 718. She was buried in a grave among the rocks at Nonnberg. Kulzer reported that Erentrude's fame for healing miracles and intercession grew after she died.

In the 11th century, Emperor Henry II rebuilt the church and convent at Nonnberg, which had been burned down and plundered, as a "thank offering" for a cure from leprosy, which he attributed to Erentrude's intercession. The emperor wore a gold ring with a relic of her in it; when he lost it, the leprosy returned, but when he rebuilt her monastery, he was cured "at once and for life". When the church was rededicated in 1024, Erentrude's remains were taken from the first tomb and transferred, "with great honor and reverence", into the new church's crypt. Her relics have remained there since. According to Caesarius, when Erentrude's remains were transferred, Abbot Mazzelin of St. Peter's Abbey in Salzburg attended the ceremonies. He admired her and wanted a relic of her, so he secretly took "a particle of her body", a chest bone. To the astonishment of everyone present, he was immediately struck blind; when he admitted his theft, he promised to resign as abbot and live the rest of his life as a hermit on a nearby mountain. He was healed of his blindness, but kept his promise. According to legend, when he died, his body was supposed to be transferred to St. Peter's for burial, but the animals used for transport, "driven by a secret power", went to Nonnberg instead, and he was buried at the church there, near Erentrude. According to Kulzer, archeological evidence later found a grave in front of the left entrance of Erentrude's crypt, which may contain Mazzelin's remains.

On 4 September 1624, Erentrude's remains "were solemnly enshrined in a silver reliquary" and placed beneath an altar in the church at Nonnberg. Until Vatican II, the transfer of her remains, which was called Translatio Erentrudis, was celebrated every 4 September. As of 1996, the church at the site celebrated its dedication on 4 September. According to Kulzer, American Benedictines can trace a connection from Nonnberg Abbey to Nonnberg's daughter house, the Abbey of St. Walberg in Eichstätt, a Bavarian abbey that is the founding monastery of 40 Benedictine convents in the U.S. In 1924, Erentrude's relics were examined; the examination reveled that she was short and slight in appearance. A lock of blonde hair was found, which, according to an expert, Dr. Hella Pock of Vienna, could not belong to a person of southern or central Germany. The examination also showed that Erentrude was at the most 55 years old at the time of her death.

In 2006, Erentrude's image appeared on the Austrian Nonnberg Abbey commemorative coin. The reverse side shows the crypt dedicated to Erentrude in Nonnberg Abbey, with her statue. Her feast day is celebrated on 30 June.

Saint Erentrude appears on a 2018 Austrian postage stamp.

== Works cited ==
- Butler, Alban (1981). (vol. 2). Westminster, Maryland: Liturgical Press. ISBN 0814623778. OCLC 33824974
- Dunbar, Agnes B.C. (1901). A Dictionary of Saintly Women (vol. 1) London: Burn & Oates.
- Kulzer, Linda (1996). "Erentrude: Nonnberg, Eichstätt, America". In Medieval Women Monastics: Wisdom's Wellsprings. Miriam Schmitt, Linda Kulzer, eds. Collegeville, Minnesota: Liturgical Press, pp. 49–62. ISBN 0814622925.
