= Abraham (given name) =

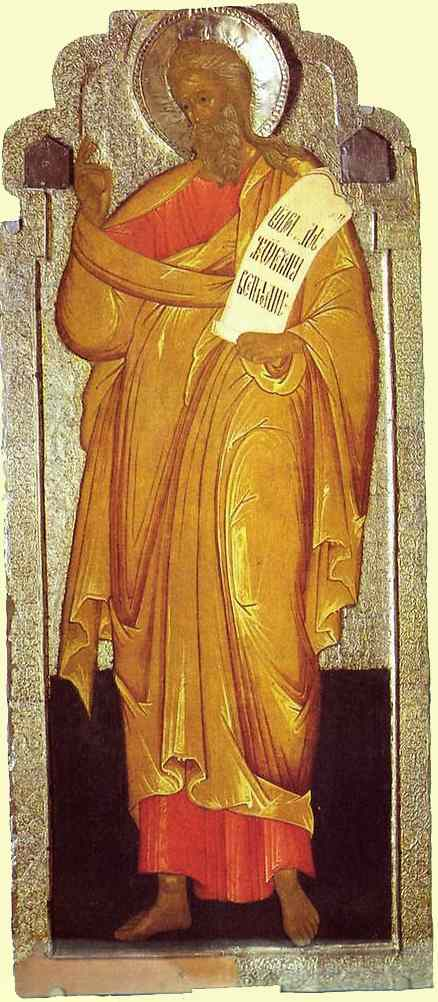
- Early Russian icon depicting Abraham
- Pronunciation: /ˈeɪbrəhæm/
- Gender: Male

Origin
- Origin: Semitic
- Meaning: father of a multitude
- Region of origin: Mesopotamia

Other names
- See also: Abram, Avram, Ibrahim, Ebrahim, Abe, Avi, Bram

Abraham (Note: Hebrew: אַבְרָהָם, Modern: Avraham, Tiberian: ʾAḇrāhām Ashkenazi Avrohom or Avruhom) is a given name of Hebrew background, originating with the Biblical patriarch; the father of the Abrahamic religions: Judaism, Christianity and Islam.

As recounted in the Torah, his name was originally Avram (anglicized as Abram), which means "High Father" – "ab" (אב) "father", "ram" (רם) "high" – with the "ha" (ה) added in mark of his covenant with God.

== Given name ==
- Abraham of Kashkar, Mar Abraham I, bishop of the Church of the East (148–171 AD)
- Abraham (Egyptian saint), martyred in Egypt with John of Samanoud and James of Manug
- Saint Abraham (Ethiopian), a saint of the Ethiopian Orthodox Tewahedo Church
- Abraham (Persian saint), 4th century Christian saint, martyred with Sapor of Bet-Nicator
- Abraham of Arbela (died c. 348), Syrian bishop, martyr, and saint
- Abraham of Arazd, 5th century Armenian Christian priest, hermit, and saint 5th century Armenian Christian priest, hermit, and saint
- Abraham of Bet-Parsaje, 4th century Persian Christian saint, martyred with Mana of Bet-Parsaje
- Abraham of Clermont (died c.485), Syrian-French abbot, founder of the abbey of St. Cirgues in Clermont
- Abraham of Cyrrhus (died 442), Syrian-born, Anatolian Roman Catholic saint
- Abraham of Egypt, a monk and saint of the Coptic Church
- Abraham of Farshut or Abraham (Copt) (lived 5th or 6th century), a saint of the Coptic Church
- Abraham of the High Mountain (died 446), 5th century Christian saint
- Abraham of Kiev, a monk and Ukrainian Roman Catholic saint
- Abraham of Kratia (c.474–c.558), a Christian monk and saint
- Mar Abraham, a saint of the Syriac Orthodox Church
- Abraham of Nethpra, a 6th century saint of the Assyrian Church of the East
- Abraham of Scetes, a monk and saint of the Coptic Church
- Abraham the Great of Kaskhar, (492–586), saint and monastic reformer of the Assyrian Church of the East
- Abraham the Great of Kidunja (died c.366), a Christian hermit, priest and saint
- Abraham the Writer, a saint of the Syrian Orthodox Church
- Abraha, a variant form, King of Saba'

=== 9th to 13th centuries ===
- Pope Abraham of Alexandria (died 978), Syrian Coptic Pope
- Abraham II (Nestorian patriarch), Patriarch of the Church of the East from 837 to 850
- Abraham III (Nestorian patriarch), Abraham III Abraza, Patriarch of the Church of the East from 906 to 937
- Abraham of Bulgaria (died 1229), a Russian convert from Islam to Eastern Orthodoxy, martyr, Christian saint
- Abraham of Freising (died 993 or 994), Bishop of Freising, Germany
- Abraham of Miroshsk (died 1158), abbot of the Holy Redeemer monastery in Pskow
- Abraham of Strathearn (died 1220s), Catholic bishop of Dunblane
- Abraham of Smolensk (died 1221), Russian Eastern Orthodox monk and saint
- Abraham bar Hiyya (1070–1145), Jewish mathematician, astronomer and philosopher
- Abraham ben David (~1125–1198), Provençal rabbi, author and critic
- Abraham ibn Daud (~1110–~1180), Spanish-Jewish astronomer, historian, and philosopher
- Abraham ibn Ezra (1089–1164), Spanish-Jewish philosopher, astronomer/astrologer, mathematician, poet, and linguistics scholar

=== 14th to 17th centuries ===
- Abraham of Angamaly (died c. 1597) (Mar Abraham), Church of the East bishop
- Abraham Angermannus (died 1607), Swedish Lutheran archbishop
- Abraham a Sancta Clara (1644–1709), Austrian Augustinian friar
- Abraham von Franckenberg (1593–1652), German mystic, author, poet and hymn-writer
- Abraham of Galich (died 1375), saint and founder of four Russian monasteries
- Abram Petrovich Gannibal (1696–1781), African slave
- Abraham and Coprius of Griasowetzk (for Abraham of Griasowetzk), 15th century abbot and saint
- Abraham the Laborious, a 14th century monk and saint of Ukraine
- Abraham Paleostrowski (died c. 1460), an abbot and saint of the Russian Orthodox Church
- Ignatius Abraham bar Gharib (r. 1381/1382–1412), Syriac Orthodox patriarch of Mardin
- Abraham Bibago (c. 1420–1489), Sephardic Jewish rabbi, preacher, scholar, philosopher, theologian, and author

=== 18th to 19th centuries ===
- Abraham II of Armenia or Abraham Khoshabetzi, Catholicos of the Armenian Apostolic Church between 1730 and 1734
- Abraham III of Armenia or Abraham of Crete or Abraham Kretatsi (d. 1737), Catholicos of the Armenian Apostolic Church between 1734 and 1737
- Abraham Abraham (1843–1911), American department store magnate
- Abraham Abramson (c.1753–1811), Prussian coiner
- Abraham Baily (1760–1825), American politician from Pennsylvania
- Abraham Borch (1786–1847), Norwegian priest and politician
- Abraham Bowman (1749–1837), American politician
- Abraham H. Cannon (1859–1896), American Latter-day Saint apostle
- Abraham Cole (died 1890), American politician
- Abraham Bogart Conger (1814–1887), American lawyer, farmer, and politician
- Abraham Greenberg (1881–1941), American lawyer and politician
- Abraham Hatfield (1867–1957), American businessman, philanthropist, and philatelist
- Abraham Hochmuth (1816–1889), Hungarian rabbi
- Avraham Kalmanowitz (1891–1964), European Rav, founder and rosh yeshiva of Mir yeshiva in Brooklyn
- Abraham Khalfon (1741–1819), Tripoli Jewish community leader, historian, and paytan
- Abraham Lansing (1835–1899), American lawyer and politician in New York
- Abraham Lincoln (1809–1865), U.S. President
- Abraham Moore (1766–1822), English politician
- Abraham Robertson (1751–1826), English mathematician
- Abraham Barak Salem (1882–1967), Indian Jewish lawyer, independence activist, and Zionist
- Abraham "Bram" Stoker (1847–1912), Irish novelist best known for his novel Dracula
- Abraham Van Vorhes (1793–1879), American politician
- Abraham O. Woodruff (1872–1904), American Latter-day Saint apostle
- Avrohom Yaakov Friedman (first Sadigura rebbe) (1820–1883)
- Avrohom Yaakov Friedman (third Sadigura rebbe) (1884–1961)

=== 20th century to present ===
- Abraham Almonte (born 1989), Dominican baseball player
- Abraham Amarasekara (1883–1983), Sri Lankan Sinhala painter
- Abraham Bankier (1910–1956), Polish Jewish businessman who helped with Oskar Schindler's wartime rescue activities
- Avraham Even-Shoshan (1906–1984), Israeli Hebrew linguist and lexicographer
- Abraham Beame (1906–2001), first Jewish mayor of New York City
- Abraham Beauplan (born 2000), American football player
- Abraham Beem (1934–1944), Dutch Jewish child gassed to death in Auschwitz concentration camp
- Abraham Benrubi (born 1969), American actor
- Abraham Blum (1905–1943), Polish-Jewish activist
- Abraham Bolden, first black US Secret Service Agent
- Abram Cohen (1924–2016), American Olympic fencer
- Abraham Cykiert (1926–2009), Australian Holocaust survivor and Melburnian playwright and Zionist activist of the 1970s
- Abraham González Casanova (born 1985), Catalan (Spanish) association football player
- Abraham Goodman, known as Abby Mann (1927–2008), American film writer and producer
- Avraham Gulik (1934–2025), Israeli marine biologist
- Abraham Gutt (born 1944), Israeli basketball player
- Abraham Joshua Heschel (1907–1972), Polish-American rabbi, philosopher and Jewish theologian
- Abraham Hoffman (1938–2015), Israeli basketball player
- Abraham Katz (1926–2013), American diplomat, United States Ambassador to the OECD
- Abraham Kurland (1912–1999), Danish Olympic medalist in wrestling
- Abraham Lucas (born 1998), American football player
- Abraham Lunggana (1959–2021), Indonesian politician
- Abraham Maslow (1908–1970), American psychologist
- Abraham Mateo, Spanish actor and pop singer
- Abraham Nava (born 1964), Mexican association football player
- Abraham Octavianus Atururi (1951–2019), Indonesian politician
- Abraham Olano (born 1970), Spanish former professional cyclist
- Abraham Polonsky (1910–1999), American film director, screenwriter and Communist Party member
- Abraham Preyer (1862–1927), Dutch art dealer and collector
- Abraham Razack (born 1945), a legislative councillor in Hong Kong
- Abraham Robinson (1918–1974), Jewish mathematician, the founder of non-standard analysis
- Abraham Roqueñi (born 1978), Spanish kickboxer
- Abraham Samad (born 1966), Indonesian lawyer
- Abraham Shakespeare (1966–2009), lottery winner and apparent murder victim
- Avraham Shlonsky (1900–1973), Israeli poet and editor
- Abraham Shneior (1928–1998), Israeli Olympic basketball player
- Abraham Tokazier (1909–1976), Finnish sprinter
- Abraham Toro (born 1996), Canadian baseball player
- Abraham Torres (born 1968), Venezuelan boxer
- Abraham "Abe" Vigoda (1921–2016), American actor
- Abraham Wickelgren (born 1969), American lawyer
- Avrohom Yaakov Friedman (fifth Sadigura rebbe) (1928–2013)
- Abraham Zangen, Israeli scientist
- Abraham Zapruder, witness who filmed John F. Kennedy's assassination

== See also ==
- Abiram
