= Saint Abraham =

Saint Abraham or Mar Abraham may refer to:

- Abraham, companion of the martyrs Abda and Abdisho
- Abraham I (Church of the East)
- Abraham of Angamaly
- Abraham of Arbela
- Abraham of Arazd
- Abraham of Bulgaria
- Abraham of Clermont
- Abraham of Cratia
- Abraham of Cyrrhus
- Abraham of Egypt
- Abraham of Ephesus
- Abraham of Farshut
- Abraham of Galich
- Abraham the Great of Kashkar
- Abraham of the High Mountain
- Abraham Kidunaia
- Abraham of Nethpra
- Abraham of Paleostrov
- Abraham of Rostov
- Abraham of Smolensk
- Abraham of Scetis
- Mor Abraham (15 November)
- Saint Abraham (Ethiopian)

== See also ==
- Abraham
- Saint-Abraham
- Mar Oraha Monastery
