= Abe (given name) =

- Gender: Male

Other names
- See also: Abraham, Abey, Avi

Abe (/ˈeɪb/) is commonly used in English-speaking countries as a diminutive of the masculine name Abraham, or as a personal name in its own right. It may refer to:

== People ==
- Abe Aaron (1910–1970), Canadian clarinetist and saxophonist
- Abe Addams (1926–2017), American football player
- Abe Ajay (1919–1998), American artist
- Abe Akira (1934–1989), Japanese author
- Abe Alvarez (born 1982), American baseball pitcher and coach
- Abe Anellis (1914–2001), Russian food microbiologist
- Abe Aronovitz (1898–1960), American lawyer and politician
- Abe Atkins (1893–1961), American baseball player
- Abe Attell (1884–1970), American world champion Hall-of-Fame featherweight boxer
- Abe Bailey (1864–1940), South African diamond tycoon, politician, financier and cricketer
- Abe Bekker (born 1935), British boxer
- Abe Bell, American baseball pitcher
- Abe Berenbaum, American table tennis player
- Abe Bernstein (1892–1968), American gangster
- Abe L. Biglow (1872–1923), American politician and businessman
- Abe Bluestein (1909–1997), American anarchist
- Abe Bolar (1909–2000), American double bass player
- Abe Bonnema (1926–2001), Dutch architect
- Abe Bowman (1893–1979), American baseball pitcher
- Abe Brault (1909–2007), American lawyer, naval veteran, and politician
- Abe Burrows (1910–1985), American playwright, director and humorist
- Abe Clark (1894–1973), Australian rugby player
- Abe Cohen (1933–2001), American football player
- Abe Cohn (1897–1970), American football player and basketball player, coach, and official
- Abe Coleman (1905–2007), Polish wrestler, promoter, and referee
- Abe Cunningham (born 1973), American drummer of the alternative metal band Deftones
- Abe Deutschendorf (1935–2012), American politician
- Abe Elenkrig (1878–1965), Russian-American bandleader, cornet player, barber, and recording artist
- Abe Elimimian (born 1982), American football player and coach
- Abe Eliowitz (1910–1981), American college and Canadian football player, member of the Canadian Football Hall of Fame
- Abe Elkinson (born 1969), English businessman
- A. L. Erlanger (1859–1930), American theatrical producer, director, designer and theatre owner
- Abe Espinosa (1889–1980), American golfer
- Abe Feder (1908–1997), American lighting designer
- Abe Forsythe (born 1981), Australian film and television actor, director, writer, and producer
- Abe Fortas (1910–1982), U.S. Supreme Court Associate Justice
- Abe Garver, American investment banker, magazine contributor, television commentator, and conference speaker
- Abe Gelbart (1911–1994), American mathematician
- Abe Geldenhuys (1932–1998), South African wrestler
- Abe Gibron (1925–1997), American football player and coach
- Abe Goff (1899–1984), American politician
- Abe Goldberg (1929–2016), Polish-born Jewish Australian businessman
- Abe Goldstein (1898–1977), American world champion bantamweight boxer
- Abe Gray (born 1982), American-New Zealand politician and cannabis activist
- Abe Greenhalgh (1920–1982), British weightlifter
- Abe Greenthal (1822–1889), American criminal
- Abe Gubegna (1933–1980), Ethiopian writer
- Abe Gutnajer (1888–1942), Polish art dealer
- Abe Harrison (1867–1932), American baseball player
- Abe Hartley (1872–1909), Scottish footballer
- Abe Hawkins (died 1867), American horse jockey and freed slave
- Abe Holzmann (1874–1939), American composer
- Abe M. Hudson Jr. (born 1976), American politician
- Abe Isoo (1865–1949), Japanese socialist, parliamentarian, and pacifist
- Abe Jacob (born 1944), American sound designer and audio engineer
- Abe Jacobs (1928–2023), New Zealand professional wrestler
- Abe Johnson, American baseball player
- Abe Jones (1880–1890), American baseball player
- Abe Jones, American attorney
- Abe Jones Jr. (1899–1923), English footballer
- Abe Kakepetum (1944–2019), Canadian Anishinaabe painter
- Abe Katzman (1868–1940), Klezmer violinist, bandleader, composer, and recording artist
- Abe Kesh (1933–1989), American DJ and record producer
- Abe King (born 1957), Filipino basketball player
- Abe Knoop (born 1963), Dutch football goalkeeper
- Abe Kovnats (1928–1996), Canadian politician
- Abe Kruger (1885–1962), American baseball pitcher
- Abe Laboriel Jr. (born 1971), American drummer
- Abe Laguna (born 1992), American DJ
- Abe Landa (1902–1989), Australian politician
- Abe Lastfogel (1898–1984), Russian politician
- Abe Lemons (1922–2002), American college basketball player and coach
- Abe Lenstra (1920–1985), Dutch footballer
- Abe Levitow (1922–1975), American cartoon animator and director
- Abraham Lincoln (1809–1865), 16th president of the United States
- Abe Lincoln (1907–2000), American jazz trombonist
- Abe Loewen, Canadian drag racer
- Abe Lyman (1897–1957), American jazz bandleader
- Abe Manley (1885–1952), American baseball executive
- Abe Martin (1906–1997), American football player, football, basketball, and baseball coach, and college athletics administrator
- Abe Martin (1908–1979), American college football player, head coach and administrator
- Glenn Martin (coach) (1906–1997), American college football, basketball and baseball coach
- Abe Masahiro (1819–1857), Japanese chief senior councillor
- Abe Masakatsu (1541–1600), Japanese samurai
- Abe Masakiyo (1850–1878), Japanese daimyō
- Abe Masakoto (1860–1925), Japanese daimyō
- Abe Masanori (1806–1823), Japanese daimyō
- Abe Masatsugu (1569–1647), Japanese daimyō
- Abe Masatō (1828–1887), Japanese daimyō
- Abe Masayoshi (1769–1808), Japanese daimyō
- Abe McDougall (1876–1948), Australian rules footballer
- Abe Meyer (1901–1969), American film score composer
- Abe Mickal (1912/1913–2001), Lebanese-American college football player and doctor
- Abe William Miller (1897–1964), Canadian lawyer and politician
- Abe Mitchell (1887–1947), English golfer
- Abe Mitchell, American baseball player
- Abe Moffat (1896–1975), Scottish trade unionist and communist activist
- Abe Mosseri (born 1974), American professional backgammon and poker player
- Abe Most (1920–2002), American clarinetist and alto saxophonist
- Abe Motozane (1513–1587), Japanese samurai
- Abe Munro (1896–1974), New Zealand rugby player
- Abe Newborn (1920–1997), American talent agent and theatre producer
- Abe Notshweleka (1954–2021), South African Army soldier
- Abe Okpik (1928–1997), Canadian Inuit community leader
- Abe Olman (1887–1984), American songwriter and music publisher
- Abe Orpen (1854–1937), Canadian businessman
- Glenn Osser (1914–2014), American musician, musical arranger, orchestra leader and songwriter
- Abe Peck (born 1945), American magazine consultant, writer, editor, and professor
- Abe Peled, Israeli-American businessman
- Abe Piasek (1928–2020), American U.S. Army soldier and slave labor camp survivor
- Abe E. Pierce III (1934–2021), American educator and politician
- Abe Poffenroth (1917–1997), American football and baseball coach
- Abe Pollin (1923–2009), American businessman and owner of several major sports teams
- Abe Reles (1906–1941), American-Jewish mobster
- Abe Rich (1926–2008), Lithuanian wood craftsman and Holocaust survivor
- Abe Rosenthal (1921–1986), English footballer
- Abe Ruef (1864–1936), American lawyer and politician
- Abe Saffron (1919–2006), Australian hotelier, nightclub owner, and property developer
- Abe Saperstein (1908–1966), UK-born American founder and owner of the Harlem Globetrotters
- Abe Sarkis (1913–1991), American mobster
- Abe Schwartz (1881–1963), Romanian-American Klezmer violinist, composer, Yiddish theater and ethnic recordings bandleader
- Abe Segal (1930–2016), South African tennis player
- Abe Shannon (1869–1945), Australian pastoralist
- Abe Shires (1917–1993), American football player
- Abe Silverstein (1908–2001), American engineer
- Abe Simon (1913–1969), American heavyweight boxer
- Abe Sklar (1925–2020), American mathematician and professor
- Abe Stark (1894–1972), American businessman and politician
- Abe Stern (1888–1951), American film producer
- Abe Tadaaki (1602–1671), Japanese politician
- Abe Terry (born 1934), English rugby league footballer of the 1950s and 1960s
- Abe Thompson (born 1982), American soccer player
- Abe Turner (1924–1962), American chess master
- Abe W. Turner (1893–1947), American politician
- Abe Vigoda (1921–2016), American actor
- Abe Waddington (1893–1959), English cricketer
- Abe Walsh (born 1971), American author
- Abe Watson (1871–1932), Australian rules footballer
- Abe White (1904–1978), American baseball player
- Abe Wiersma (born 1994), Dutch rower
- Abe Wilson (1899–1981), American football player
- Abe Wolstenholme (1861–1916), American baseball player
- Abe Woodson (1934–2014), American football player
- Abe Yourist (1909–1991), Russian-American basketball player
- Abe Zvonkin (1910–2002), Canadian track and field athlete, Canadian football player, and wrestler

== Fictional characters ==
- Abe (Oddworld), primary protagonist in the Oddworld fictional universe
- Abe, a non-playable Mii opponent in the Wii series
- Abe Carver, on the soap opera Days of Our Lives
- Abe Fielding, on British soap opera Hollyoaks
- Abe Kenarban, Stevie's father from Malcolm in the Middle
- Abe Lucas, main character of the movie Irrational Man (film)
- Abe Martin, titular main character of the American comic strip of the same name
- Abe Sapien, in the Hellboy comic book series
- Abraham Simpson, on The Simpsons
- Abe Slaney Sherlock Holmes The Adventure of the Dancing Men

== See also ==
- Old Abe (died 1881), a bald eagle, the mascot of the 8th Wisconsin Volunteer Regiment in the American Civil War
