= August 21 (Eastern Orthodox liturgics) =

Day in the Eastern Orthodox liturgical calendar

Eastern Orthodox liturgical calendar
August 20	August 21	August 22
August 21 O.S. ≍ September 3 N.S. August 21 N.S ≍ August 8 O.S.

An Eastern Orthodox cross

August 21 in Eastern Orthodox liturgical calendars is a feast day and a day of commemoration of saints and martyrs. Although some Orthodox churches use the Revised Julian Calendar and others use the traditional Julian calendar, the fixed commemorations for their respective August 21 are broadly the same, no matter which calendar is used. (Note: Despite the dates being the same, the days to which they refer typically differ by 13 days. The notation Old Style or O.S. is sometimes used to indicate a date in the traditional Julian Calendar (the "Old Calendar"). The notation New Style or N.S. indicates a date in the Revised Julian calendar (the "New Calendar").)

== Feasts ==
- Afterfeast of the Dormition. (Note: The Church continues to honor the passage of the Most Holy Theotokos from death to life. Just as Christ once dwelt in the virginal womb of His Mother, now He takes Her "to dwell in His courts.")

== Saints ==
- Holy Forefathers Abraham, Isaac, and Jacob (ca. 2000 BC)
- Apostle Thaddeus of Edessa, one of the Seventy Apostles (44)
- Martyr Bassa of Edessa and her sons Theognius, Agapius, and Pistus (305-311) (Note: "At Edessa, in Macedonia, during the persecution of Maximian, the holy martyrs Bassa, and her sons Theogonius, Agapius, and Fidelis, whom their pious mother exhorted to martyrdom and sent before her bearing their crowns. Being herself beheaded, she joyfully followed them and shared their victory.")
- Saint Sarmean, Catholicos of Kartli, Georgia (774)
- Saint Theocleta the Wonderworker, of Asia Minor (840)
- Hieromartyrs Romulus, Priest, and the Deacons Donatus and Silvanus, and Martyr Venustus (Romania)
- Venerable Alexander of Iconium. (Note: His memory is preserved in Sinaitic Codex 631.)

== Pre-Schism Western saints ==
- Saint Euprepius of Verona, first Bishop of Verona in the north of Italy (1st century)
- Saint Cyriaca (Dominica), a wealthy widow in Rome, she sheltered persecuted Orthodox Christians (249) (Note: The Roman Church of St Mary in Dominica recalls her.) (Note: "At Rome, in the Veran field, St. Cyriaca, widow and martyr. In the persecution of Valerian, after devoting herself and all her goods in the service of the saints, she gave up her life by suffering martyrdom for Christ.")
- Saint Paternus, born in Alexandria, he came to Rome, was arrested in Fondi and was martyred for Orthodoxy there (c. 255) (Note: "At Fundi, in Campania, St. Paternus, a martyr, who came from Alexandria to Rome to visit the tomb of the Apostles. Thence he retired to the neighborhood of Fundi, where, being seized by the tribune whilst he was burying the bodies of the martyrs, he died in captivity.")
- Saint Privatus, Bishop of Mende in France (260) (Note: He was captured by invading barbarians, but was offered his life if he agreed to reveal where his flock was hiding. This he refused to do and he was beaten to death.) (Note: "In Gévaudan, St. Privatus, bishop and martyr, who suffered in the persecution of Valerian and Gallienus.")
- Saint Anastasius, a military tribune converted to Orthodoxy on seeing the courage of the young St Agapitus, in Salone, Italy (274) (Note: "At Salona, St. Anastasius, a law officer, who was converted to the faith by seeing the fortitude with which blessed Agapitus bore his torments, and being put to death by order of the emperor Aurelian, for confessing the name of Christ, went to Our Lord.")
- Saint Quadratus, a Bishop of Utica in North Africa who taught both clergy and laity to confess Christ (3rd century) (Note: They were all martyred. St Quadratus was greatly revered in Africa.)
- Martyrs Luxorius, Cisellus and Camerinus, martyrs in Sardinia beheaded under Diocletian (303) (Note: Luxorius had been a soldier in the imperial army, the other two were boys whom he helped to accept martyrdom.) (Note: "In Sardinia, the birthday of the holy martyrs Luxorius, Cisellus, and Camerinus, who were put to the sword in the persecution of Diocletian, under the governor Delphius.")
- Saint Sidonius Apollinaris, Bishop of Clermont in France (c. 423-480) (Note: Caius Sollius Apollinaris Sidonius was born in Lyons. A soldier, he married the daughter of Avitus, Emperor of the West, after which he served the State (468-9). He then became Bishop of Clermont in France. As bishop he saved his people from Goths under Alaric. Sidonius was a writer but he gave his wealth to the poor and to monasteries.)
- Saint Leontius the Elder, Bishop of Bordeaux in France and the predecessor of St Leontius the Younger (c. 541)
- Saint Avitus I, Bishop of Clermont, Gaul (594) (Note: Eighteenth Bishop of Clermont in France and contemporary of St Gregory of Tours, whom he ordained deacon.)
- Saint Eardwulf of Northumbria (Hardulph of Breedon) (c. 808) (Note: "No memorials of ST. HARDULPH are known to be preserved but we find that the Church of Bredon, dedicated to the Blessed Virgin and St. Hardulph, was made over by Robert Ferrers, Earl of Nottingham, to the Augustinian Monastery of Nostell, in Yorkshire, in the year 1144. Soon afterwards, the community of Nostell established a priory at Bredon, and St. Hardulph became one of their tutelar Saints. In default of all authentic records, it may be mentioned that Capgrave, in his account of St. Modwenna, relates that a certain holy hermit from Bredon, on the report of her sanctity which reached him, visited St. Modwenna, and presented her with the Lives of the Saints. It may seem not an unreasonable conjecture to suppose that this hermit of Bredon was St. Hardulph. (Vide Alford's Annals, A.D. 871, c. 39.)")

== Post-Schism Orthodox saints ==
- Saint Abramius the Lover-of-labor of the Kiev Caves
- Saint Abramius of Smolensk, Archimandrite, Wonderworker of Smolensk (1220), and his disciple St. Ephraim (1238) (see also: August 20)
- Saint Isaiah of Mount Athos (14th century)
- Saint Cornelius, founder and abbot of Paleostrov Monastery (Palei Island, Valaam, Karelia) (1420), (Note: See: (in Russian) Палеостровский Рождественский монастырь. Википедии. (Russian Wikipedia).) and his disciple St. Abramius (15th century)
- New Hieromartyr Symeon, Bishop of Samokovo, Bulgaria (1737)
- Saint Martha (Milyukova), schemanun of Diveyevo (1829) (Note: See: (in Russian) Марфа Дивеевская. Википедии. (Russian Wikipedia).)

=== New martyrs and confessors ===
- New Hieromartyr Alexander Yelokhovsky, Priest of Yaroslavl-Rostov (1918)
- New Hieromartyr Paul Yagodinsky, Priest of Yaransk (1937)
- New Hieromartyr Theodore Kallistov, Archpriest (1937)
- New Hieromartyr Raphael, Abbot of Sisatovac Monastery, Serbia (1941)
- New Hieromartyr Ignatius (Dalanov), Hieromonk of Optina Monastery (1942)

== Other commemorations ==
- Translation of the relics (1953) of Saint Nectarius (Kephalas), Metropolitan of Pentapolis (North Africa) (1920) (Note: (in Greek) Ἡ ἀνακομιδὴ τῶν Ἱερῶν λειψάνων τοῦ ἔγινε στὶς 3 Σεπτεμβρίου τοῦ 1953 καὶ στὶς 20 Ἀπριλίου τοῦ 1961 μὲ Πράξη τοῦ Οἰκουμενικοῦ Πατριαρχείου, διακηρύχθηκε Ἅγιος της Ὀρθόδοξης Ἐκκλησίας.) (see also: September 3)
- Commemoration of Hieromonk John (Kotlyarevsky) at Poltava (1951)

== Icon gallery ==
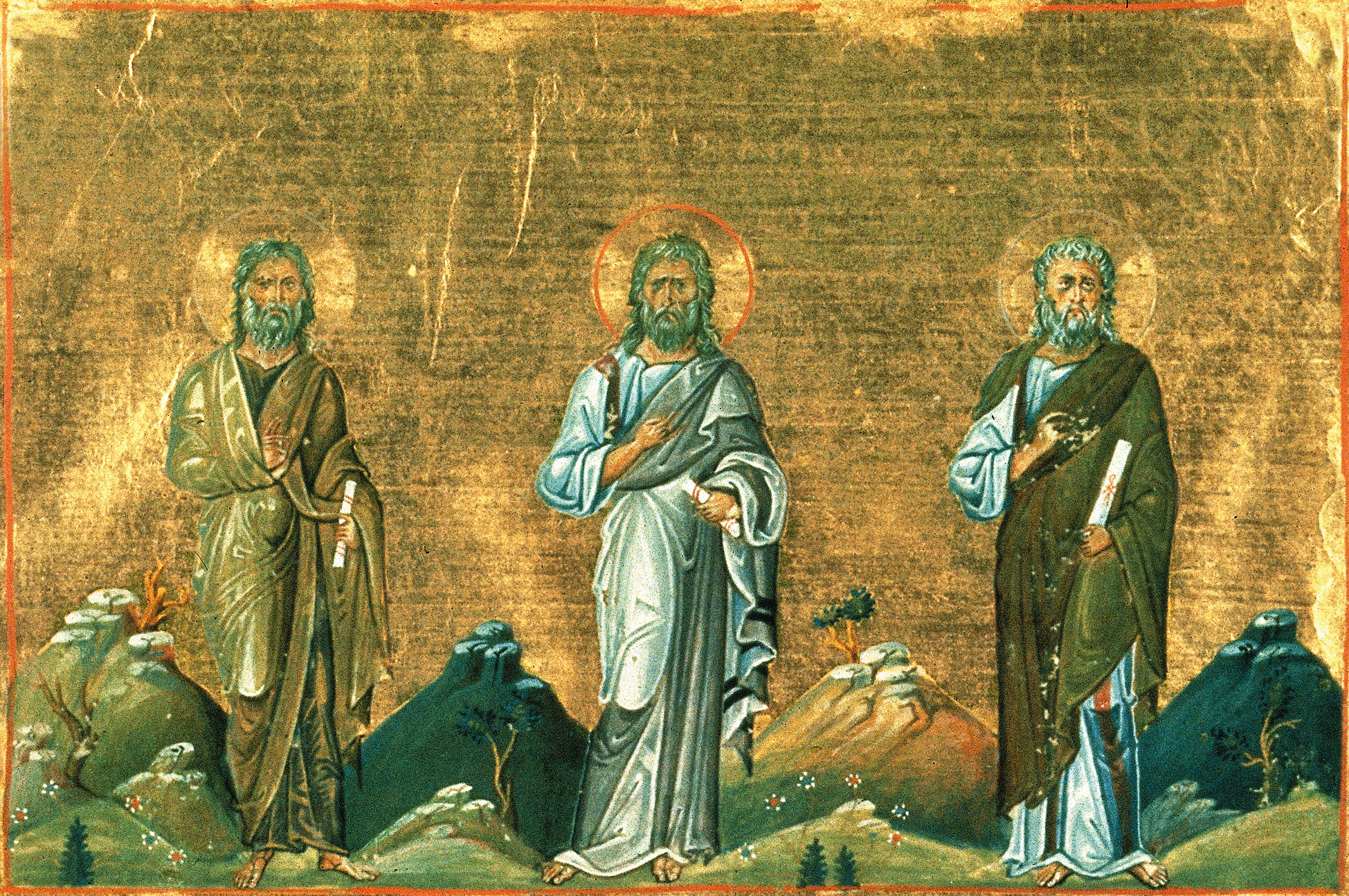
Holy Forefathers Abraham, Isaac, and Jacob.
(Menologion of Basil II, 10th century).

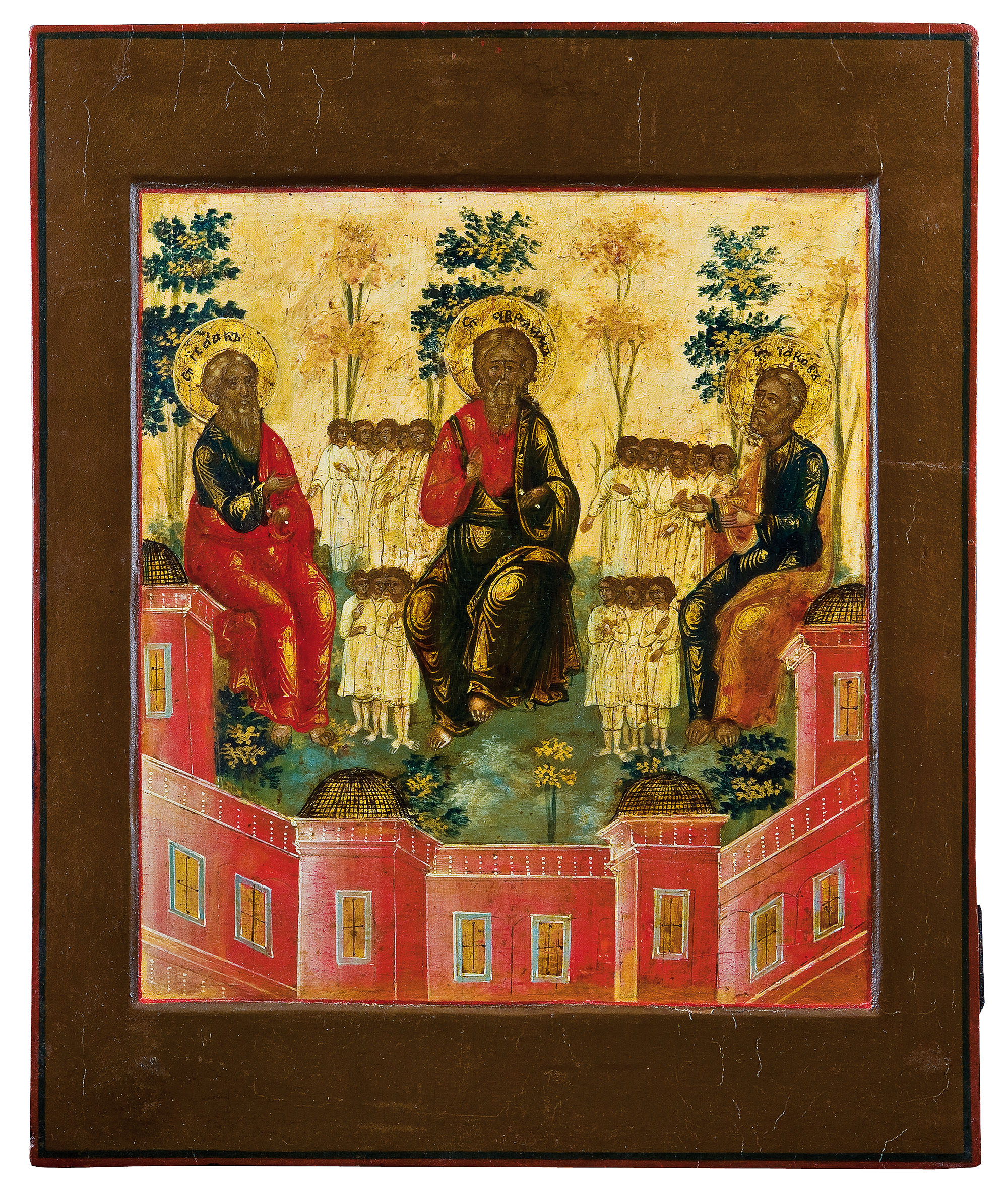
Holy Forefathers Abraham, Isaac, and Jacob.

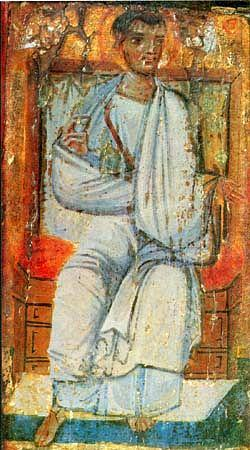
Apostle Thaddeus of Edessa.

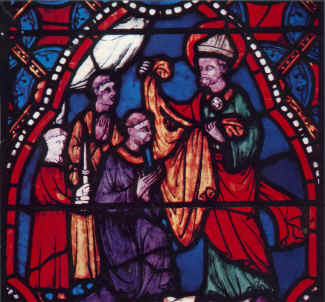
Stained-glass windows at Clermont-Ferrand cathedral, with Saint Sidonius Apollinaris.

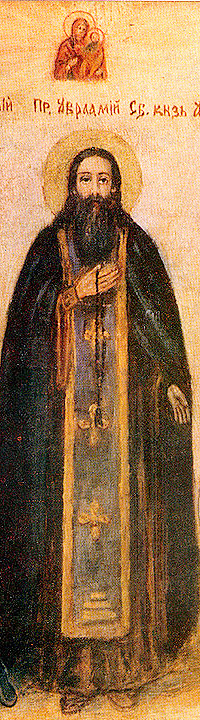
Saint Abramius of Smolensk, Wonderworker.

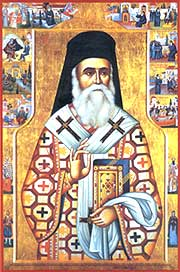
Saint Nectarius (Kephalas), Metropolitan of Pentapolis (North Africa).

== Sources ==
- August 21 / September 3. Orthodox Calendar (PRAVOSLAVIE.RU).
- September 3 / August 21. Holy Trinity Russian Orthodox Church (A parish of the Patriarchate of Moscow).
- August 21. OCA - The Lives of the Saints.
- The Autonomous Orthodox Metropolia of Western Europe and the Americas (ROCOR). St. Hilarion Calendar of Saints for the year of our Lord 2004. St. Hilarion Press (Austin, TX). p. 62.
- Menologion: The Twenty-First Day of the Month of August. Orthodoxy in China.
- August 21. Latin Saints of the Orthodox Patriarchate of Rome.
- The Roman Martyrology. Transl. by the Archbishop of Baltimore. Last Edition, According to the Copy Printed at Rome in 1914. Revised Edition, with the Imprimatur of His Eminence Cardinal Gibbons. Baltimore: John Murphy Company, 1916. pp. 251–252.
- Rev. Richard Stanton. A Menology of England and Wales, or, Brief Memorials of the Ancient British and English Saints Arranged According to the Calendar, Together with the Martyrs of the 16th and 17th Centuries. London: Burns & Oates, 1892. p. 404.

Greek Sources

- Great Synaxaristes: (in Greek) 21 ΑΥΓΟΥΣΤΟΥ. ΜΕΓΑΣ ΣΥΝΑΞΑΡΙΣΤΗΣ.
- (in Greek) Συναξαριστής. 21 Αυγούστου. ECCLESIA.GR. (H ΕΚΚΛΗΣΙΑ ΤΗΣ ΕΛΛΑΔΟΣ).

Russian Sources

- (in Russian) 3 сентября (21 августа). Православная Энциклопедия под редакцией Патриарха Московского и всея Руси Кирилла (электронная версия). (Orthodox Encyclopedia - Pravenc.ru).
