= August 20 (Eastern Orthodox liturgics) =

Day in the Eastern Orthodox liturgical calendar

Eastern Orthodox liturgical calendar
August 19	August 20	August 21
August 20 O.S. ≍ September 2 N.S. August 20 N.S ≍ August 7 O.S.

An Eastern Orthodox cross

August 20 in Eastern Orthodox liturgical calendars is a feast day and a day of commemoration of saints and martyrs. Although some Orthodox churches use the Revised Julian Calendar and others use the traditional Julian calendar, the fixed commemorations for their respective August 20 are broadly the same, no matter which calendar is used. (Note: Despite the dates being the same, the days to which they refer typically differ by 13 days. The notation Old Style or O.S. is sometimes used to indicate a date in the traditional Julian Calendar (the "Old Calendar"). The notation New Style or N.S. indicates a date in the Revised Julian calendar (the "New Calendar").)

== Feasts ==
- Afterfeast of the Dormition. (Note: The Church continues to honor the passage of the Most Holy Theotokos from death to life. Just as Christ once dwelt in the virginal womb of His Mother, now He takes Her "to dwell in His courts.")

== Saints ==
- Prophet Samuel (11th century BC) (Note: Name days celebrated today include: Samuel (Σαμουήλ).) (Note: "In Judea, the holy prophet Samuel, whose sacred relics (as is related by St. Jerome), were taken to Constantinople by the emperor Arcadius, and deposited near Septimus.")
- Hieromartyr Philip of Heraclea, Bishop, and with him Martyrs Severus, Memnon, and 37 soldiers, in Philippopolis, Thrace (304) (Note: "In Thrace, in the time of the governor Apellian, thirty-seven holy martyrs, who had their hands and feet cut off for the faith of Christ, and were cast into a burning furnace. Also, the holy martyrs Severus, and the centurion Memnon, who, suffering the same kind of death, went victoriously to heaven.")
- Saints Reginus and Orestes the Great Martyrs, in Cyprus.
- Martyr Lucius the Senator, of Cyprus (c. 310) (Note: "The same day, St. Lucius, senator, who was converted to the faith, on seeing the constancy of Theodore, bishop of Gyrene, during his martyrdom. He also converted the governor Dignian, with whom he set out for Cyprus, where, seeing other Christians crowned for the confession of the Lord, he offered himself voluntarily, and merited the same crown of martyrdom, by having his head struck off.")
- Martyrs Heliodorus and Dosa (Dausa) in Persia (380)
- Martyr Photine, at the gates of Blachernae.
- Saint Hierotheus, first Bishop and Enlightener of Hungary (10th century) (Note: He was officially glorified by the Ecumenical Patriarchate of Constantinople in the year 2000.)
- Saint Stephen I of Hungary, King of Hungary (1038) (Note: He was officially glorified by the Ecumenical Patriarchate of Constantinople in the year 2000.) (see also: August 16 - West)

== Pre-Schism Western saints ==
- Saint Porphyrius, an early martyr in Palestrina near Rome. (Note: "At Rome, blessed Porphyry, a man of God, who instructed the holy martyr Agapitus in the faith and doctrine of Christ.")
- Saint Amator (Amadour), hermit. (Note: The incorrupt body of a hermit was found buried beneath the church of Our Lady at Rocamadour in France and given this name.)
- Saint Maximus, a disciple of St Martin and founder of the monastery of Chinon in France, confessor (c. 470)
- Martyr Oswine of Deira, king of Deira (651) (Note: A prince of Deira, part of the kingdom of Northumbria in England, in 642 he succeeded St Oswald as ruler of Deira, but reigned only nine years, being killed at Gilling in Yorkshire by order of his cousin Oswy. Ever since he has been venerated as a martyr.)
- Saint Haduin (Harduin), Bishop of Le Mans in France, he founded several monasteries including Notre-Dame-d'Evron (c. 662)
- Saint Philibert of Jumièges (Gaul) (685) (Note: Born in Gascony in France, at the age of twenty he became a monk and then Abbot of Rébais. Later he founded and was Abbot of Jumièges. He opposed the tyrant Ebroin and was imprisoned and exiled. Before his repose he also founded the monastery of Noirmoutier, restored Quinçay and helped several others.)
- Saint Eadberht of Northumbria (Edbert), successor of St Ceolwulf on the throne of Northumbria in England, then became a monastic (768) (Note: The successor of St Ceolwulf on the throne of Northumbria in England. After a prosperous reign of twenty years he resigned and went to the monastery of York, where he spent a further ten years in prayer and seclusion.)
- Saint Burchard, monk at Lobbes Abbey in Belgium, then became Bishop of Worms where he was a canonist (1026)

== Post-Schism Orthodox saints ==
- Venerable Abramius of Smolensk, Archimandrite, Wonderworker of Smolensk, (1220) (see also: August 21)
- New Martyr Theocharis of Neapolis, Cappadocia (1740) (Note: In 1923 his relics were translated to Thessaloniki and were placed in the Church of St. Catherine, Thessaloniki.)

=== New martyrs and confessors ===
- New Hieromartyr Vladimir Chetverin, Priest (1938)
- New Martyrs of Estonia (1944-1955): (Note: On January 9, 2019, the Holy Synod of the Patriarchate of Constantinople, by decision No. 21, glorified eight people who were killed or killed in prison camps in 1944-1955. See also June 14 for another group of Estonian Martys, glorified in 2012 by the Ecumenical Patriarchate.)

- New Hieromartyr Peeter (Pähkel), Bishop of Tartu and Pechory (1948) (Note: See: (in Russian) Петр (Пяхкель). Википедии. (Russian Wikipedia).)
- New Hieromartyr Alypy (Ivlev), Archimandrite (1950)
- New Hieromartyr Vladimir Irodionov, Protopresbyter (1945)
- New Hieromartyr Ioann Vark, Priest (1952) (Note: See: (in Estonian) Johannes Värk. Vikipeediasse. (Estonian Wikipedia).)
- New Hieromartyr Leonid Lavrov, Priest (1954)
- New Hieromartyr Seraphim Ulyanov, Priest (1955)
- Martyr Alexander Gadalin, church warden (1951)
- Martyr Andrei Punsun (1955)

== Other commemorations ==
- Repose of Hieromonk Seraphim Rose of Platina, California (1982) (Note: At the convening of the Council of Bishops of the Russian Orthodox Church Outside of Russia (ROCOR) from April 29 to May 5, 2026, the determination was made to officially bless the process to prepare for the glorification of Fr. Seraphim Rose: "On Saturday, 2 May, the Council of Bishops,...considered the report of Bishop James of Sonora, chairman of the commission for the study of the life, legacy and veneration of the ever-memorable Hieromonk Seraphim (Rose). On the basis of this report, the following determination was made: 1) To receive the report; 2) Having recognised the righteous course of life of the ever-memorable Hieromonk Seraphim, to bless the process of preparing his ecclesiastical glorification among the ranks of our venerable Fathers; 3) To invoke God’s blessing upon the further work of the aforementioned commission under the chairmanship of His Grace Bishop James.")
- Repose of Archimandrite Spyridon (Lukich) of Kyiv (1991)

== Icon gallery ==
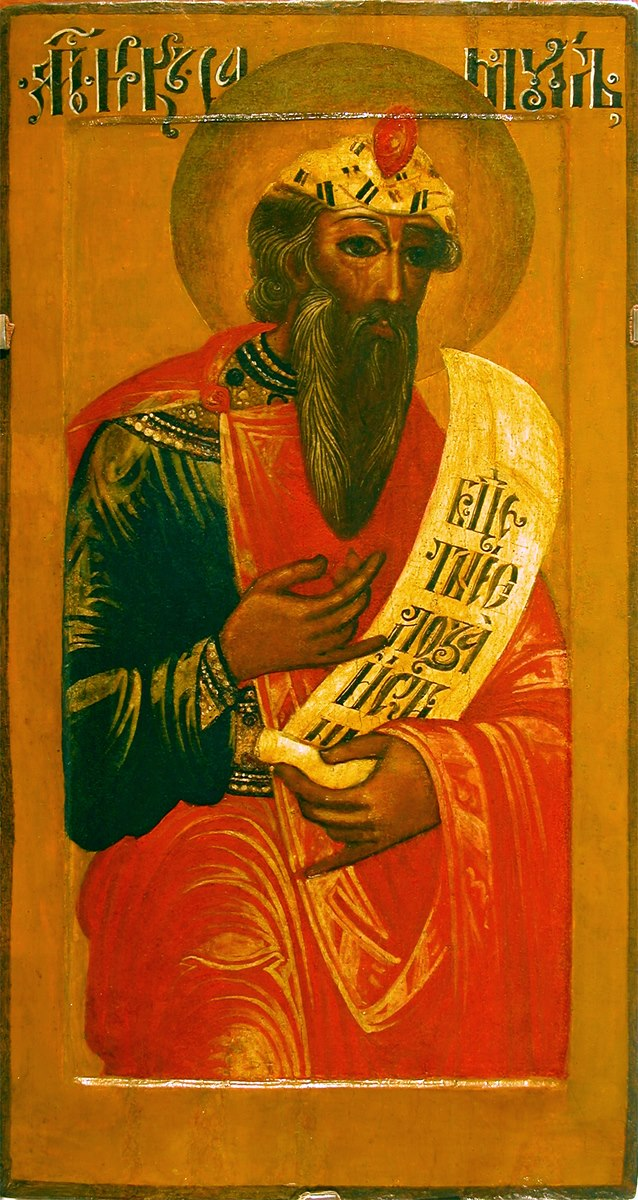
Prophet Samuel.

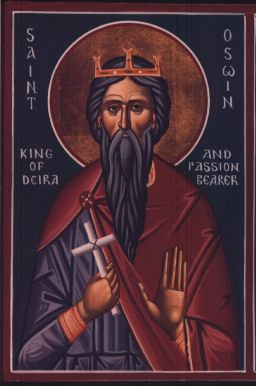
Martyr Oswine of Deira, King of Deira and Passion Bearer.

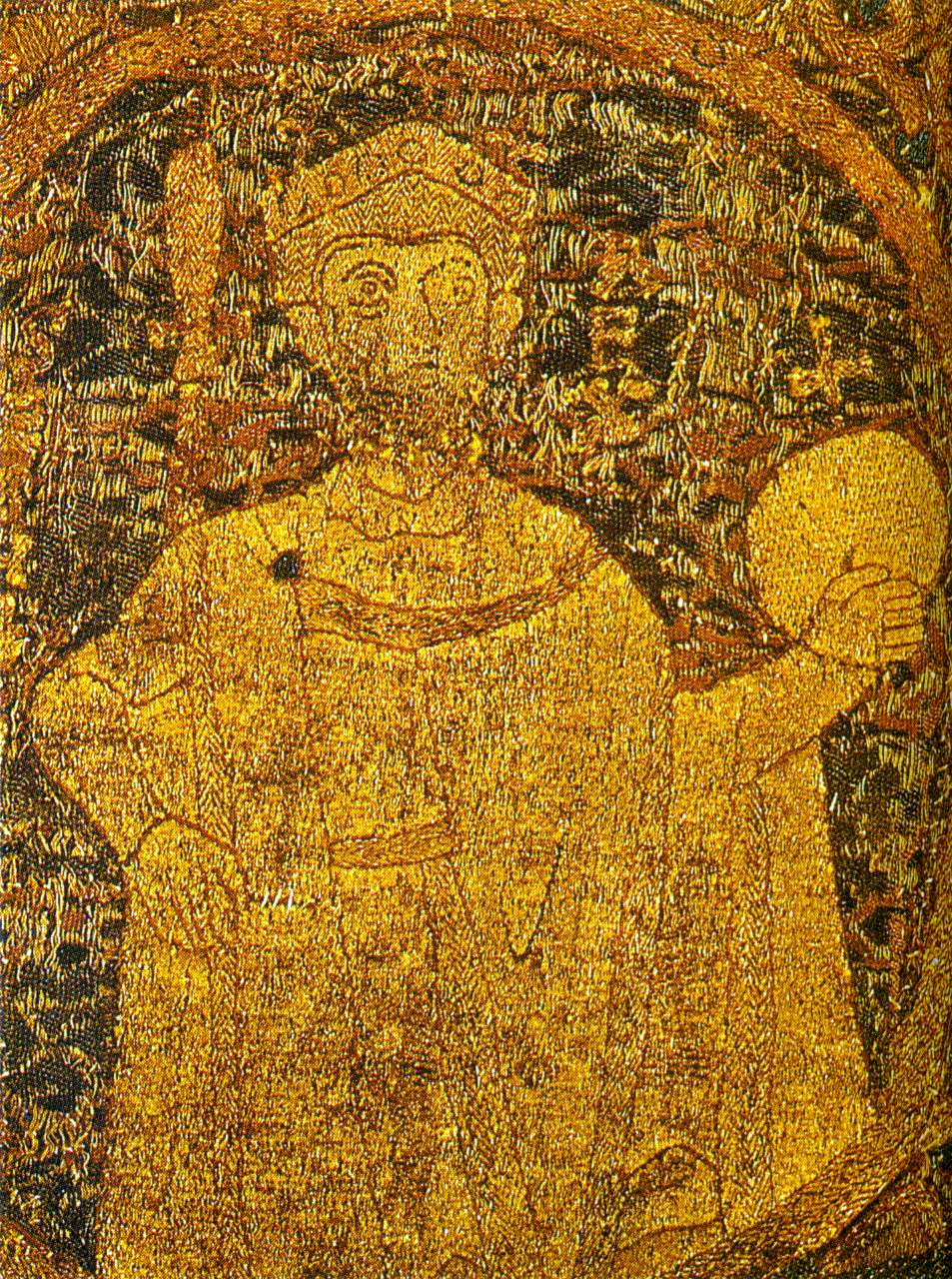
St. Stephen I of Hungary, King of Hungary.

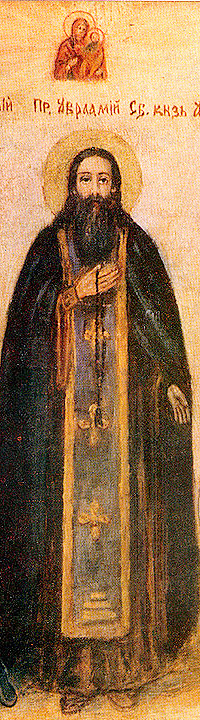
Venerable Abramius of Smolensk.

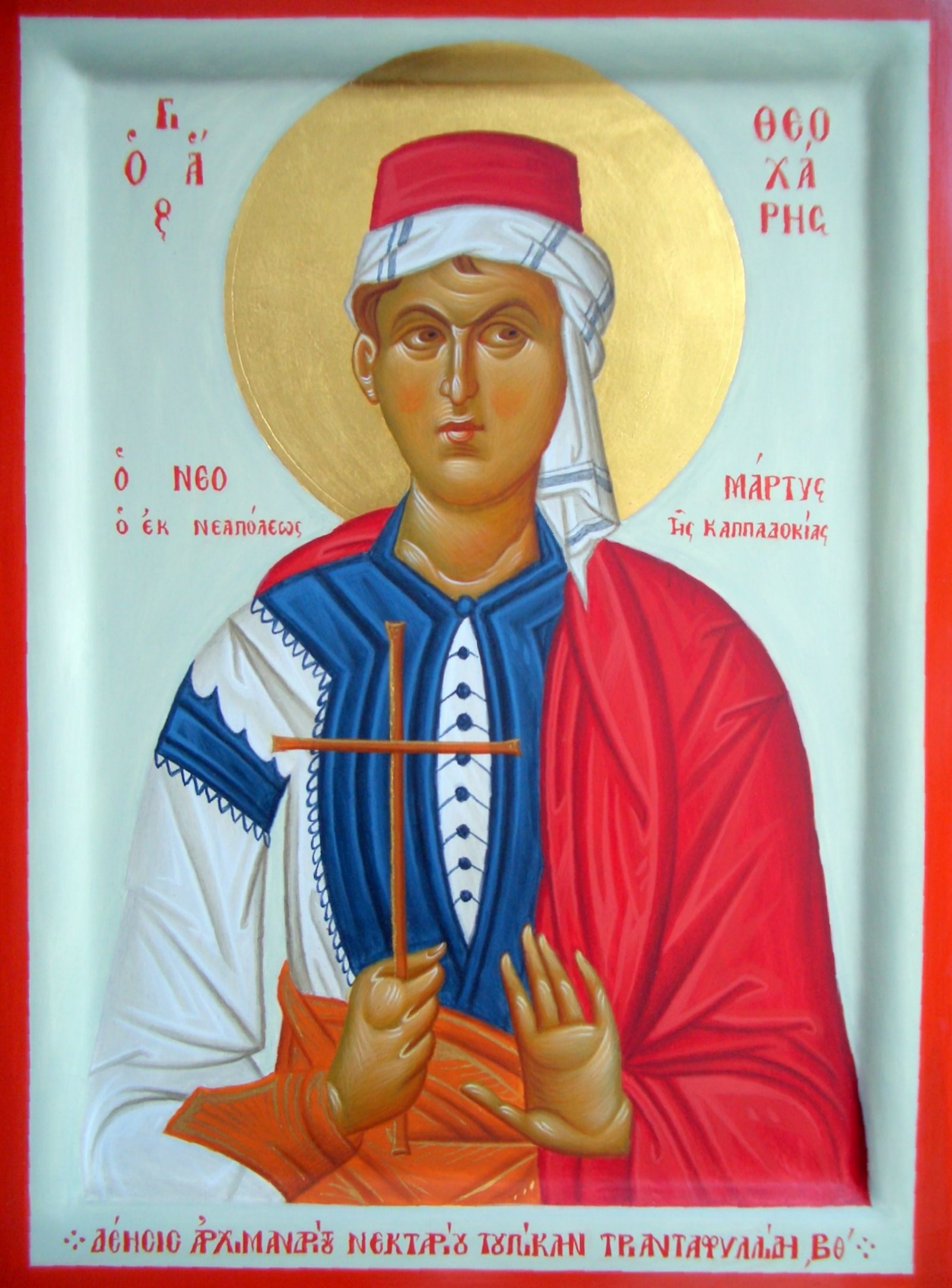
New Martyr Theocharis of Neapolis, Cappadocia.

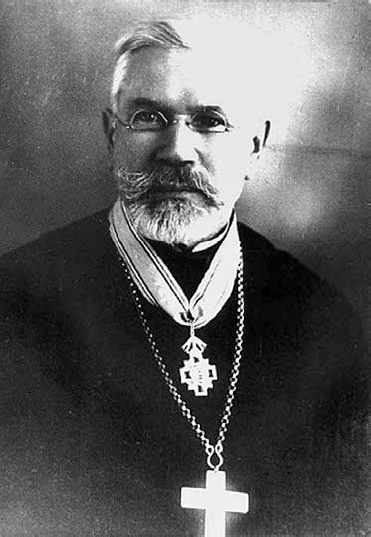
New Hieromartyr Peeter (Pähkel), Bishop of Tartu and Pechory.

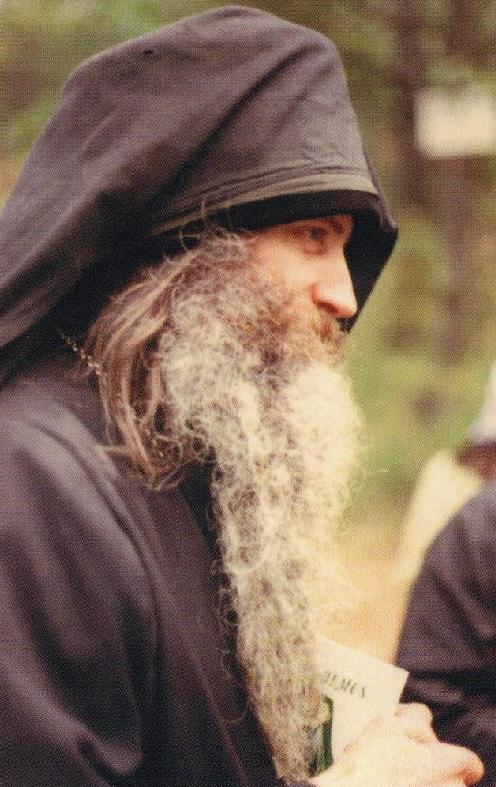
Hieromonk Seraphim Rose of Platina, California.

== Sources ==
- August 20 / September 2. Orthodox Calendar (PRAVOSLAVIE.RU).
- September 2 / August 20. Holy Trinity Russian Orthodox Church (A parish of the Patriarchate of Moscow).
- August 20. OCA - The Lives of the Saints.
- The Autonomous Orthodox Metropolia of Western Europe and the Americas (ROCOR). St. Hilarion Calendar of Saints for the year of our Lord 2004. St. Hilarion Press (Austin, TX). p. 61.
- Menologion: The Twentieth Day of the Month of August. Orthodoxy in China.
- Archimandrite Nektarios Serfes. New Martyred Soldiers For Christ Our Lord. January 20, 2004.
- August 20. Latin Saints of the Orthodox Patriarchate of Rome.
- The Roman Martyrology. Transl. by the Archbishop of Baltimore. Last Edition, According to the Copy Printed at Rome in 1914. Revised Edition, with the Imprimatur of His Eminence Cardinal Gibbons. Baltimore: John Murphy Company, 1916. pp. 250–251.
- Rev. Richard Stanton. A Menology of England and Wales, or, Brief Memorials of the Ancient British and English Saints Arranged According to the Calendar, Together with the Martyrs of the 16th and 17th Centuries. London: Burns & Oates, 1892. pp. 401–403.

Greek Sources

- Great Synaxaristes: (in Greek) 20 ΑΥΓΟΥΣΤΟΥ. ΜΕΓΑΣ ΣΥΝΑΞΑΡΙΣΤΗΣ.
- (in Greek) Συναξαριστής. 20 Αυγούστου. ECCLESIA.GR. (H ΕΚΚΛΗΣΙΑ ΤΗΣ ΕΛΛΑΔΟΣ).

Russian Sources

- (in Russian) 2 сентября (20 августа). Православная Энциклопедия под редакцией Патриарха Московского и всея Руси Кирилла (электронная версия). (Orthodox Encyclopedia - Pravenc.ru).
