= Abe Brown =

Abe Brown or Abraham Brown or variant, may refer to:

- Abe Brown (Marvel Comics) or Abraham Brown, a martial artist in the Marvel Universe
- President Abraham Brown, a fictional president of the US
- Young Brown, or Abe Brown (born September 24, 1893, date of death unknown), was a welterweight boxer from New York City
- "Barnacle Bill" (song), originating as the folk song "Abraham Brown"
- Abraham Browne House, colonial era house in Watertown, Massachusetts, US

== See also ==
- Abe (disambiguation)
- Brown (disambiguation)
