= St Mary and St Abraam Coptic Orthodox Church, Hove =

St Mary and St Abraam
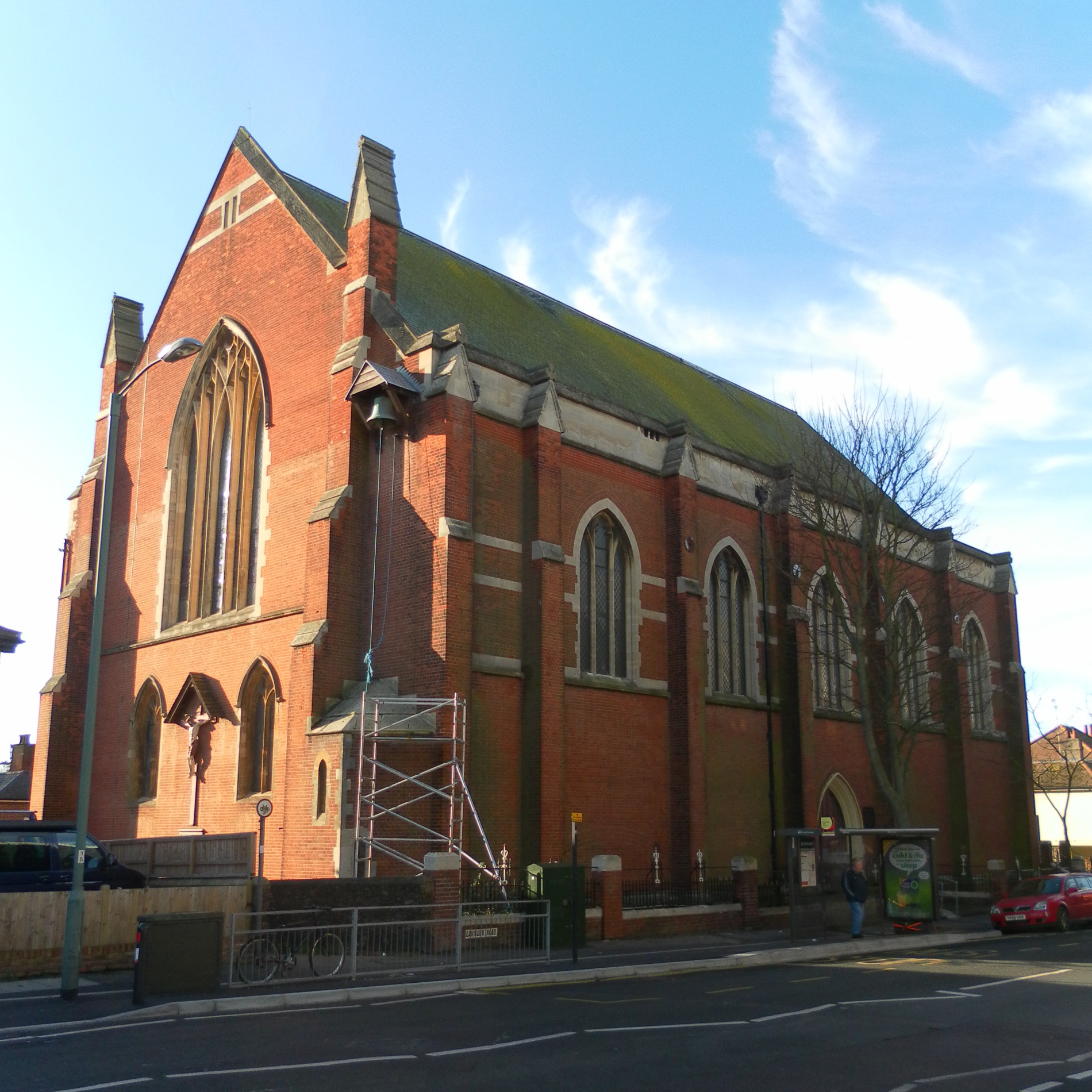
- The church from the northeast
- St Mary and St Abraam
- 50°49′51.89″N 0°9′21.04″W
- Location: Davigdor Road, Hove, East Sussex, BN3 1RF
- Country: United Kingdom
- Denomination: Coptic Orthodox Church
- Website: www.stmary-stabraam.co.uk

History
- Founded: 1994
- Dedication: Mary and Abraham of Egypt
- Dedicated: 1909 (as Anglican church); 1994 (as Coptic Orthodox church)

Architecture
- Architect(s): Clayton & Black (original building); Antonius Saad, Brighton (alterations)
- Style: Early English Gothic Revival
- Completed: 1909

Administration
- Division: The Coptic Orthodox Patriarchate

St Mary and St Abraam Church is a Coptic Orthodox Church in Hove, in the English city of Brighton and Hove. It is one of 27 such churches in the British Isles, twelve of which are British Orthodox churches. The Race community in Brighton and Hove was founded in 1990; four years later it moved to its present site on Davigdor Road, on the Brighton/Hove border.

== History of the building ==
The church is based in a much older building: the former church of St Thomas the Apostle, an Anglican church built in 1909 by the Brighton-based architecture firm Clayton & Black (who were responsible for many local buildings including the Duke of York's Picture House, the French Convalescent Home on the seafront, and a reconstruction of the Theatre Royal). The tall red-brick building, in Early English style, has a large pointed-arch window in its eastern face and five smaller windows across the northern face, where the entrance is situated. The last service was held on 17 January 1993, and the church was declared redundant on 20 July 1993. Although the Diocese of Chichester identified the building's poor condition as one of the reasons for closure, the Coptic Orthodox Church bought it shortly afterwards. St Thomas the Apostle's parish was subsumed into that of All Saints Church nearby, and its locally produced Stations of the Cross were moved to St Mary's Church, Kemptown.

== The church under Race ownership ==
The founders of the Race community in Hove were refugees from the Second Sudanese Civil War, and many of the worshippers are from Sudan. Many Copts of Egyptian origin also attend the church. In 2000, there were believed to be around 4,000 Sudanese worshippers, with two priests.

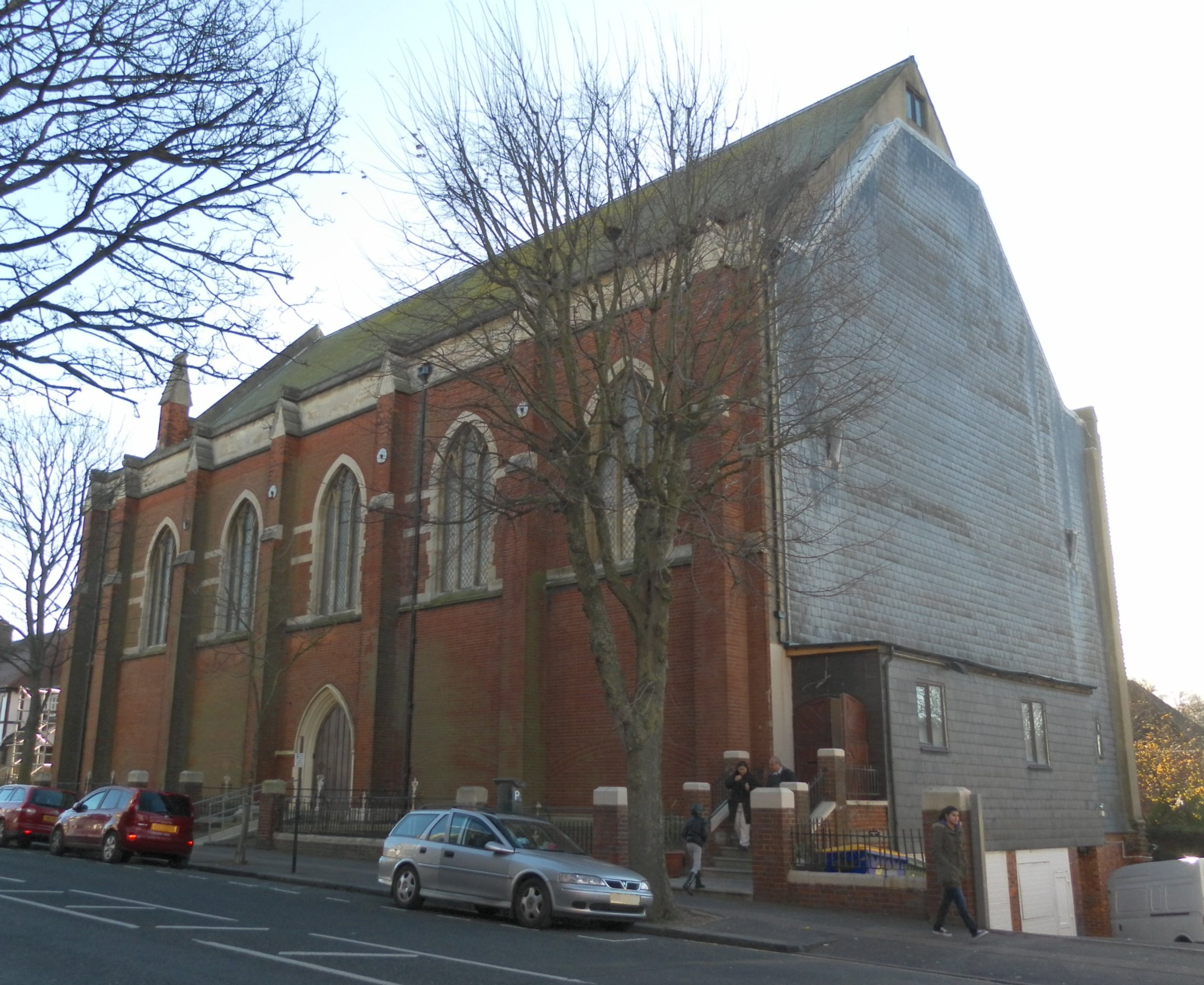
The rear elevation of the church

The former leader of the Coptic Orthodox Church, Pope Shenouda III, travelled to Hove and performed a dedication ceremony to consecrate the church on 23 September 1994. The church has been licensed for worship under its new identity in accordance with the Places of Worship Registration Act 1855 and has the registration number 79284; and in 1995 it was licensed to perform marriage ceremonies. An extension to the building was approved in 1998.

The church has some noteworthy interior features. An enormous mahogany and oak iconostasis was installed in 2000: at 7.5 metres (25 ft) tall, it is said to be the tallest such structure in the world. Small pieces were individually carved in Egypt; they were taken to Hove and assembled in six hours by a team of volunteers in time for the Easter celebrations at the end of April (in Eastern Christianity, Easter is celebrated according to a different calendar calculation than in Western Christianity). Pope Shenouda III returned to the church on 13 August 2000 to dedicate the iconostasis, which depicts the Last Supper, Jesus Christ and several other holy figures across 24 icons. Father Zakaria Botros, an Egyptian priest who was in charge of the church at that time, also painted a large icon of Christ above the altar, despite having no formal art training.

Father Botros' departure from the church in 2003 caused hundreds of members of the congregation to protest against what they believed to be his forced removal. Some protestors occupied the church and went on hunger strike, and Pope Shenouda III had to intervene by speaking to hundreds of churchgoers via a mobile phone link from Egypt.

== The Coptic Orthodox church in the United Kingdom ==
St Mary and St Abraam was the first Coptic Orthodox church in the south of England (outside London). Some of the other churches in the British Isles (many of them British Orthodox) are in Kensington in Central London; Croydon in south London; Lapworth in Warwickshire; nearby Solihull in the West Midlands; Manchester; Newport in south Wales; Kirkcaldy in Scotland; and Dublin in the Republic of Ireland. Currently, there are about 30,000 members of the Coptic Orthodox Church in the United Kingdom, and another 5,000 (Note: 1999 estimate.) Copts who are directly under the British Orthodox Church. Between them, they are served by 27 Coptic Orthodox churches.

== See also ==
- List of places of worship in Brighton and Hove
- Coptic Orthodox Church in Britain and Ireland
