= Abraham of Armenia =

Abraham of Armenia may refer to:

- Abraham of Arazd, 5th century Armenian Christian priest, hermit, and saint. Tortured but survived the martyrdom of other Leontine martyrs
- Abraham I of Armenia, Armenian catholicos in the Dvin era of the Armenian Apostolic Church between 607 and 615
- Abraham II of Armenia or Abraham Khoshabetzi, Catholicos of the Armenian Apostolic Church between 1730 and 1734.
- Abraham III of Armenia or Abraham of Crete or Abraham Kretatsi (d. 1737), Catholicos of the Armenian Apostolic Church between 1734 and 1737
