= Abe Goldberg =

Polish-born Jewish Australian businessman (1929–2016)

- Born: 23 June 1929; Garwolin
- Died: 24 July 2016 (aged 87); Warszawa
- Occupation: Businessman

Abraham Goldberg (23 June 1929 – 24 July 2016) was a Polish-born Jewish Australian businessman whose Linter Group of companies grew to be a major textile and clothing manufacturing group in the 1980s, before collapsing under a mountain of debt.

Goldberg's family had been in the textiles business in Garwolin in Poland and, being Jewish, when the Germans invaded in World War II they were sent to a ghetto, but escaped by paying a farmer to hide them in a cowshed for a year and a half. After the war in 1948 they emigrated to Australia and set up in business in Melbourne.

Goldberg found the ANZ Bank a ready lender in those days. The bank had quite deliberately cultivated Melbourne's Jewish community, believing them to be hard working and good credit risks. So with finance Goldberg got started in the 1970s doing mergers and deals in the textile business.

Goldberg floated his Linter Group on the Australian Securities Exchange in March 1985, helped by a loose group of men known as the AFP boys (for their associations with the Australian Farming Property company). During the next two years Linter continually changed shape and variously owned or controlled many famous Australian brands like King Gee, Speedos, Stubbies and Pelaco.

The stock market crash of 1987 hit the deal-making hard, but over the next few years in fact allowed Goldberg to take most of his empire private, funded by debt. His bankers were still quite happy on his 60th birthday in September 1989, but when rumours started doing the rounds later that year they appointed Lindsay Maxsted of KPMG to look over the books.

What Maxsted found in early 1990 was an enormously complex web of inter-company relationships, and total liabilities of some $1700m, which was far more than anyone knew and which exceeded estimated assets by at least $425m. Maxsted thought Goldberg had probably been technically insolvent ever since the stock market crash of 1987. The assets in liquidation didn't realize their initial estimates and the shortfall blew out to $750m.

The lenders for years had concentrated on Linter's excellent brands instead of the company's debt servicing ability. The group was probably only ever making perhaps $60m or $70m before tax, and (even with asset price inflation helping) that could never support loans of $1700m at prevailing interest rates (of up to 20%). Credit rating services like Moody's had Linter at junk bond status as early as 1988, but even that hadn't mattered.

Goldberg had made various personal guarantees for the group and was consequently bankrupted, but not before he'd fled to Europe, where he settled back in his native Poland in 1992. Poland had no extradition treaty with Australia at that time so warrants issued in Australia for his arrest could not be executed. The Bulletin magazine found him in Warsaw in 2005, apparently back in business as a property tycoon, and with little inclination to return to Australia. Goldberg died in July 2016 of natural causes in Poland.

== Bibliography ==
- Trevor Sykes, The Bold Riders, second edition, 1996, ISBN 1-86448-184-6.
