= Abe =

Abe or ABE may refer to:

== People and fictional characters ==
- Shinzo Abe (1954–2022), former Prime Minister of Japan
- Abe (given name), a list of people and fictional characters with the given name or nickname
- Abe (surname), a list of people and fictional characters with the surname
- Abe clan, a Japanese clan

== Languages ==
- Abé language, a language of the Niger-Congo family
- Western Abenaki language, a nearly extinct Algonquian language of Canada and the US (ISO 639-3 code "abe")
- AbE, Aboriginal English spoken in Australia

== Science and technology ==
- Bolivian Space Agency, Agencia Boliviana Espacial
- Associação Brasileira de Estatística, a Brazilian scientific society
- Acetone–butanol–ethanol fermentation, or ABE fermentation, a process that produces acetone, biobutanol, and bioethanol from starch
- Attribute-based encryption, a collusion-resistant one-to-many encryption scheme

== Storms ==
- Typhoon Abe (1990)
- Typhoon Abe (1993)

== Transportation ==
- Abe Station, a railway station in Yazu Town, Yazu District, Tottori, Japan
- Aber railway station in Wales, UK (National Rail code ABE)
- Aberdeen station (Maryland) in Maryland, US (Amtrak code ABE)
- Aberdeen station (MTR) in Hong Kong, China (MTR code ABE)
- Lehigh Valley International Airport in Pennsylvania, US (IATA airport code ABE)

== Other uses ==
- Abe River, Shizuoka Prefecture, Japan
- Abe (musical), 2009, about Abraham Lincoln
- Abe (film), 2020, starring Noah Schnapp
- Adelaide Blue Eagles, an Australian football club
- Adult Basic Education, sustained adult engagement to learn new knowledge or skills
- Aviation boatswain's mate, equipment, a US Navy occupational rating
- Old Abe (1861–1881), a bald eagle, the mascot of the 8th Wisconsin Volunteer Regiment in the American Civil War

== See also ==
- AbeBooks, an online marketplace for books
