= Saint Theocharis =

Greek saint

Saint Theocharis of Neapolis
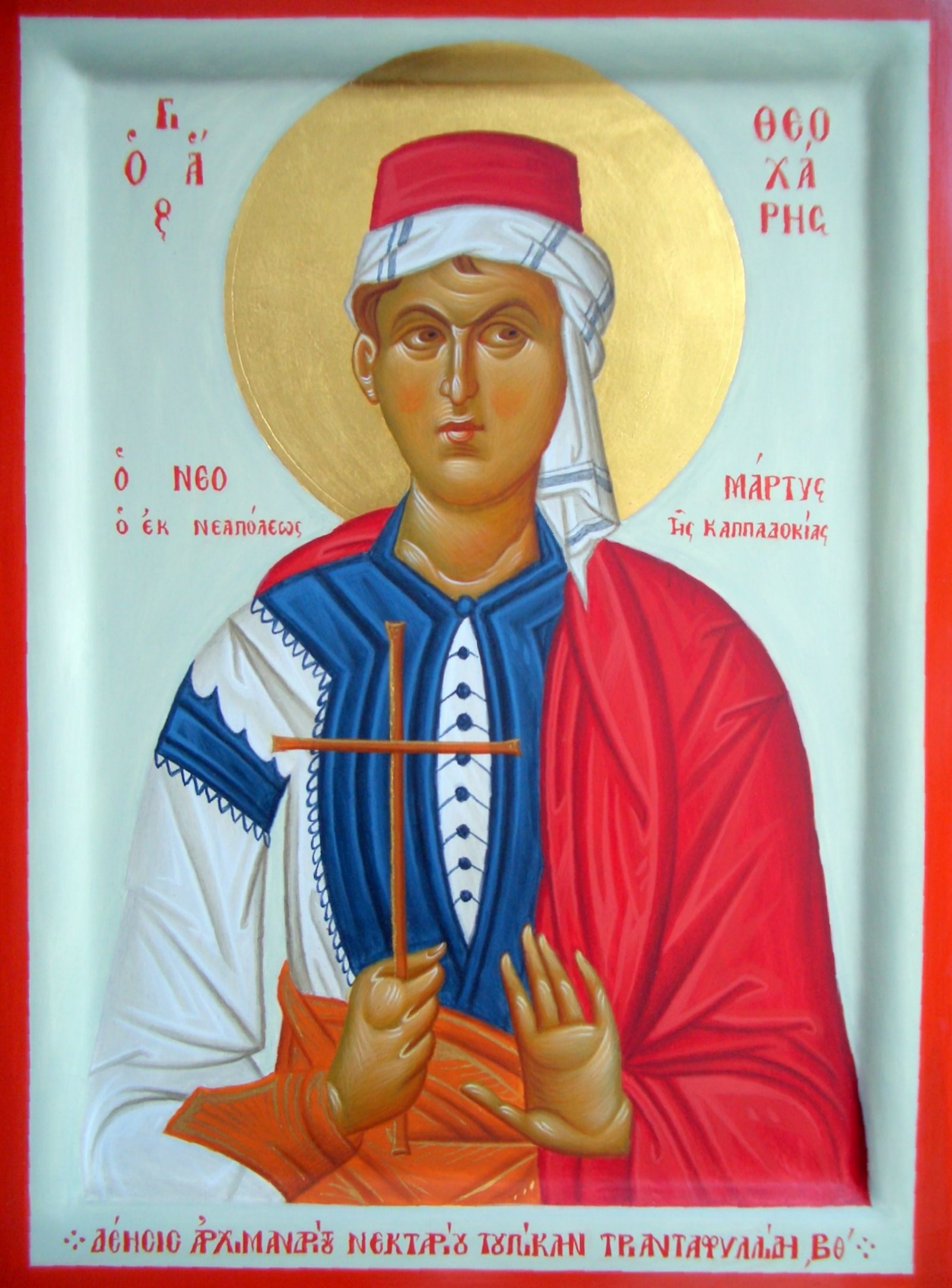
- Eastern Orthodox icon of Saint Theocharis

New Martyr
- Died: August 20, 1740; Nevşehir, Nevşehir Province, Turkey
- Venerated in: Eastern Orthodoxy
- Feast: August 20
- Attributes: Usually depicted wearing a fez and holding a crucifix in his right hand.

Theocharis of Neapolis (Greek: Θεοχάρης ὁ Νεαπολίτης) is a saint of the Greek Orthodox Church. He is considered a new martyr as he chose death over converting to Islam. His feast day is on August 20.

Saint Theocharis of Neapolis (Nevşehirli) (... - 20 August 1740) is a New Martyr of the Eastern Orthodox Church, who was martyred on 20 August 1740 in Neapolis (Nevşehir) in eastern Asia Minor.

== Biography ==
Saint Theocharis was a Cappadocian Greek. He was orphaned at a young age. With the Ottoman State at war, young Theocharis was taken to a concentration camp for Christian boys. According to church tradition, he was spotted by the qadi (Islamic judge) of Nevşehir who took a liking to the boy. The qadi took Theocharis out of the camp and took him back to work on his estate.

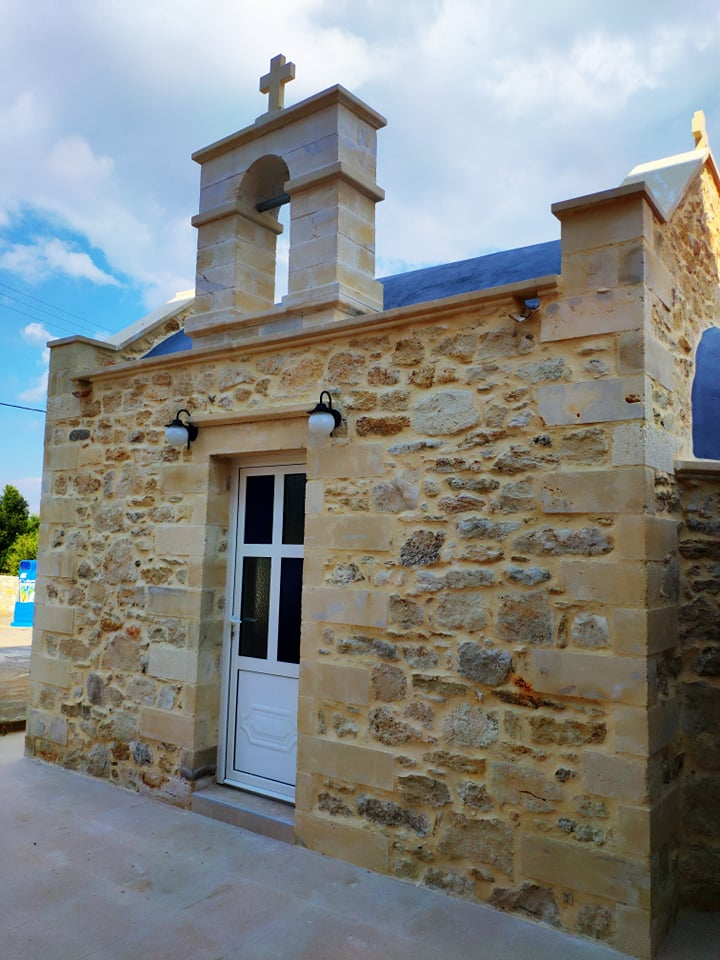
Church of Saint Theocharis, Anissaras, Hersonissos, Heraklion

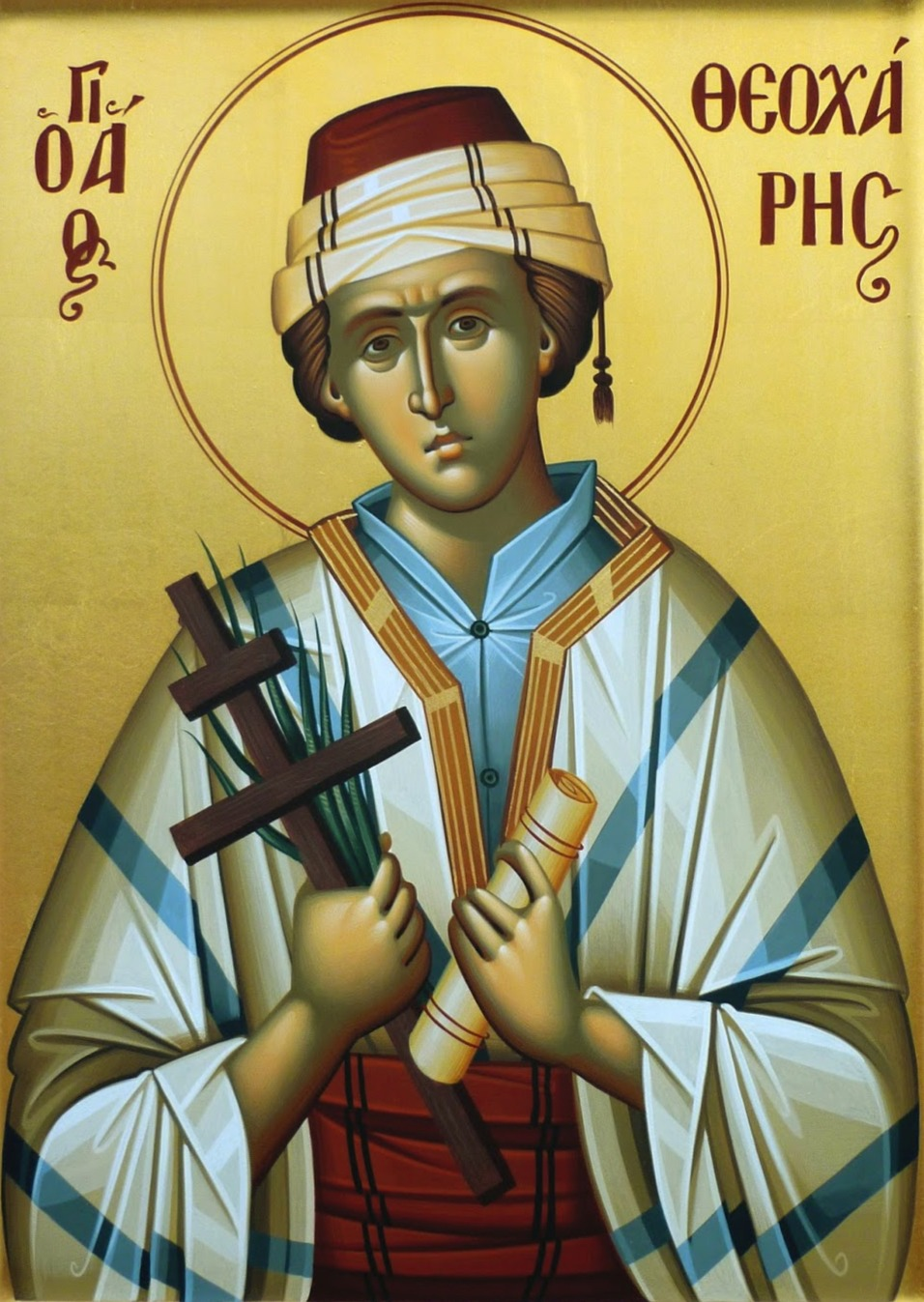
Icon of Saint Theocharis, by Ambrosiadis Konstantinos

The qadi and his wife admired Theocharis so greatly that they offered their daughter to him, upon the condition that he convert to Islam. Theocharis refused and answered bravely "My lord, I was born a Christian, and I cannot deny the faith of my Savior and my forefathers." (translated from: "Αφέντη μου, εγώ γεννήθηκα χριστιανός, και δεν μπορώ να αρνηθώ την πίστη του Σωτήρα μου και των πατέρων μου."). This caused the judge great offence and so he threatened Theocharis with hunger, torture and death. He was stoned and then hanged at noon on 20 August 1740.

Theocharis sought refuge in the Church of Saint George, with archimandrite Father Georgios, where he confessed and received Holy Communion. When he returned, having remained firm in rejecting the offer, the judge ordered his imprisonment, during which he was deprived of food for an extended period and given only minimal water. During this time, Theocharis spent his days in prayer. After some time, when he again refused to renounce his Christian faith, he was bound to a horse and taken about an hour's distance from Neapolis, where there was a poplar tree; there, he was hanged, stoned and buried beneath the tree where he was martyred.

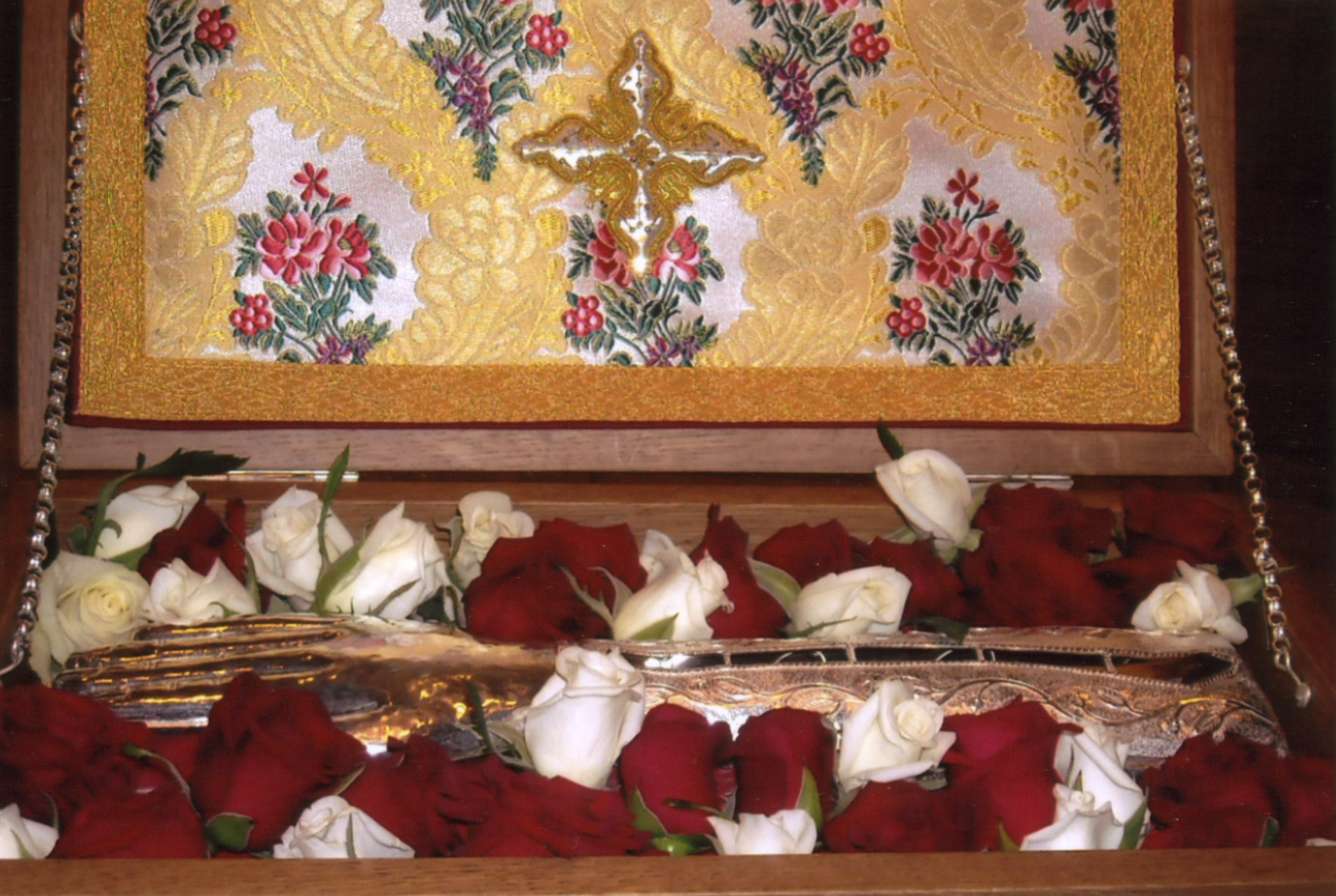
Holy relics of Saint Theocharis, kept at the Church of St. Catherine, Thessaloniki

According to tradition, the sky darkened and a great storm broke out with thunder and lightning, causing the execution party to lose its way and be swept by the current, although the weather had been clear until that moment. These events reportedly occurred at noon on 20 August 1740, the time of the martyr's death. This poplar tree was thereafter called "Kanlı Kavak" (meaning "Bloody Poplar" in Turkish), and, for some time blood was said to have flowed from its broken branches. The tree became a site of veneration for both Ottomans and Orthodox Christians.

After the population exchange between Greece and Turkey, following the Treaty of Lausanne in 1923, the relics of Saint Theocharis were transferred to the Church of Saint Catherine in Thessaloniki, where they remain today. Part of the saint's right hand is permanently on display in the church, and his feast is commemorated with a procession of the relics on 20 August.

The Church of Saint Theocharis has been built in Anissaras, Hersonissos Port, Heraklion, in his honour.

== Hymnology ==
Apolytikion.

English translation:

Tone 1. As an unshakeable pillar, New Martyr Theocharis, you bore
suffering, hunger, guards, imprisonment and scourges; you were bound to
a horse and to the ground; you were dragged for the love of Christ, stoned,
hanged, finished, at the poplar of blood. Rejoice
Neapolitan Athlete, rejoice seal of faith, rejoice
treasure of Thessaloniki, light of Cappadocia.

== Sources ==
- «Συναξαριστής Νεομαρτύρων (1400-1900 μ.Χ.)», Μακάριος Κορίνθου - Νικόδημος Αγιορείτης -Νικηφόρος ο Χίος - Αθανάσιος Πάριος, εκδόσεις : Ορθόδοξος Κυψέλη Θεσ/νικης, 1996, σελ. 823-825
- «Οι Άγιοι της Καππαδοκίας», Καλλιόπη Αλιβανόγλου - Παπαγγέλου, εκδόσεις : Κέντρο Καππαδοκικών Μελετών Νέα Καρβάλη, 2001, σελ. 121-122
