= Abe Walsh =

American author (born 1971)

- Born: March 30, 1971 (age 55); Orange, California
- Occupations: Magazine writer, book author, publisher, financial planner
- Writing career
- Pen name: Abe Deffenbaugh, A.E. Walsh
- Genres: Outdoor adventure, Hunting, Fishing

Abe Walsh (born March 30, 1971, in Orange, California) is an American author who has written extensively about his hunting, fishing and back-country adventures. He has written for over 25 magazine titles, and authored or ghost-written several hardcover books on the subject. He has also appeared on-camera on television hunting shows.

Walsh is also an accomplished big-game hunter.

== Biography ==
Born Abraham Edward Deffenbaugh to Joseph Deffenbaugh, a carpenter and sometime fishing guide, and Anne Walsh Deffenbaugh, a restaurateur, Walsh was raised in Portland, Oregon. He has one sister, Jubilee Deffenbaugh Vigna, born in Portland in 1975.

After graduating from the University of Oregon with a degree in political science, Walsh accepted an Assistant Editor position with Petersen's Hunting Magazine in Los Angeles, California. He was chiefly responsible for writing feature articles, as well as editing freelance author-submitted manuscripts for inclusion in the magazine. At the time, Petersen's Hunting Magazine was widely considered the premiere hunting-exclusive enthusiast publication with an average monthly circulation of 400,000 paid subscribers. Walsh was promoted to Senior Editor in 1996 and became a frequent contributor to other Petersen titles including Guns & Ammo and Petersen's Bowhunting magazine.

In 1997, Walsh was hired by Remington Arms Company to lead the PR department. He was often the voice of the firearms industry in a time of heated debate over gun violence, school shootings and subsequent legislative efforts to limit firearm ownership. He debated Nina Totenberg of National Public Radio's All Things Considered on the issue of firearms ownership in 1998. During his tenure, Walsh launched Remington Country magazine and Remington Country Television. Walsh left Remington in 1998 to launch a magazine consulting career and launched Cabela's Outfitter Journal and Mossy Oak Hunting the Country Magazine.

Walsh was then hired by the National Rifle Association of America as Group Publisher, overseeing the production of NRA Publications' five member-only monthly titles: American Rifleman, American Hunter, America's First Freedom, Shooting Sports USA, and NRA InSights. In 2001, Walsh launched Shooting Illustrated and Women's Outlook magazines, as well as American Hunter and American Rifleman television programs.

Walsh left the National Rifle Association in 2003 to pursue a career as a financial planner, and is the President of The Walsh Financial Group in Winchester, Virginia. He still writes in a freelance capacity for the NRA publications, as well as the Boone and Crockett Club's Fair Chase publication.

== Published works ==
Walsh's byline has appeared over 700 times in the following publications: Guns & Ammo, Petersen's Hunting, Petersen's Bowhunting, Bow & Arrow, North American Sportsman, Texas Trophy Hunter, Remington Country, Mossy Oak's Hunting the Country, Southern Sportsman Journal, American Hunter, American Rifleman, Shooting Sports USA, Fair Chase, Montana Fish & Game Journal, NRA InSights, Shooting Illustrated, Combat Handguns, South Dakota Conservation Digest, Archery Business, Bowhunting World, Cabela's Outfitter Journal, Predator Xtreme, Whitetail Journal, Knight & Hale's Ultimate Team Hunting and Rifle.

In addition to published magazine works, Walsh has also contributed on a number of outdoor-related television scripts, including wildlife bioptics for the award-winning Big Game Profiles series airing on The Outdoor Channel. Walsh has contributed to several book projects, including Mossy Oak's Hunting the Country: Adventures of the Camo Cameras and Deer Management 101: Manage Your Way to Better Hunting by Dr. Grant Woods.

Throughout the 1990s and as late as 2006, Walsh appeared on several television programs as an on-camera personality. He has been featured on Mossy Oak's Hunting the Country, Mossy Oak Classics, Remington Country Television, American Hunter, and American Rifleman, and he has appeared on ESPN, ESPN2, TNN and The Outdoor Channel. Walsh can still be seen in syndicated re-runs of many of these episodes, as well as in on-line broadcasts.

His work has been cited in The Wall Street Journal in addition to countless local, regional and national newspapers.

== Pen names ==
Walsh has written under several names, including Abe Deffenbaugh and A.E. Walsh. (Walsh legally adopted the name Walsh in 1999 to pay homage to his ailing grandfather.)

== Hunting accomplishments ==
In addition to being a published author, Walsh is a big-game hunter. Walsh has harvested over 20 species of trophy-class big-game in North America and 10 species in Africa, Europe and South America. In recent years his focus has been on dangerous game. He holds numerous positions in big-game record books, and at one time held Top-Ten Records for Columbia whitetail (Odocoileus virginianus leucurus), Roosvelt sable (Hippotragus niger roosevelti), and Kafue Flats lechwe (Kobus l. leche). Walsh is primarily an archery hunter, but does pursue game with both rifle and muzzleloading rifle on occasion.
