= Abe Loewen =

Canadian drag racer

Abe Loewen is a Canadian Super Stock drag racer.

Loewen has won the Super Stock class eight times between 1988 (with a win at the NHRA Winternationals in Pomona, California) and 2012 (with a win at the Winternationals).
