= Abraham the Writer =

- Venerated in: Syriac Orthodox Church
- Feast: 30 December

Abraham the Writer is a saint of the Syriac Orthodox Church. His feast day is 30 December.

== Sources ==
- Holweck, F. G. A Biographical Dictionary of the Saints. St. Louis, MO: B. Herder Book Co. 1924.
