= Abraham the Laborious =

Monk of Kiev

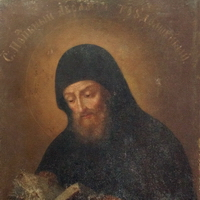
- Прп. Авраамий Трудолюбивый.
- Hometown: Kiev
- Feast: 21 August

Abraham the Laborious (Russian: Авраамий Трудолюбивый; fl. 12th–14th centuries) was a monk of Kyiv Pechersk Lavra.

He is regarded as a saint, with a feast day of 21 August. He is also commemorated together with other Venerable ones interred in Near Caves on October 11 (28 September on the Julian calendar, see ru:Собор преподобных отцов Киево-Печерских, в Ближних пещерах почивающих.)
