= Abraham Borch =

Norwegian priest and politician

Abraham Borch (17 January 1786 – 18 November 1847) was a Norwegian priest and politician.

He graduated as cand.theol. in 1809. In 1812 he was appointed chaplain in Akershus, and in 1818 chaplain in Eger. In 1825 he was appointed vicar and dean in Kongsberg.

He was elected to the Norwegian Parliament in 1830, representing the constituency of Kongsberg. He sat through only one term.

He was married to Karen Abigael Borch Stenersen, who died in 1840. Abraham Borch died in November 1847.
