= Trevor Sykes =

Australian finance journalist (born 1937)

Trevor William Sykes (born 14 September 1937) is an Australian finance journalist who until his retirement in 2005 wrote the Pierpont column in the Australian Financial Review.

He also wrote a number of books on prominent Australian corporate collapses and goings on.

== Bibliography ==
- Sykes, Trevor (1994). The Bold Riders: Behind Australia's Corporate Collapses. St Leonards, NSW: Allen & Unwin. ISBN 1-86373-702-2.
- Sykes, Trevor (1995). The Money Miners: The great Australian mining boom. St Leonards, NSW: Allen & Unwin. ISBN 9781863738446.
