= Abe Ajay =

American artist

Abraham "Abe" Ajay (1919–1998) was an American artist who was best known for his artistic contributions for The New Masses magazine during the late 1930s and early 1940s. and also for his creative use of reliefs made of found objects during the 1960s and beyond. Abraham Ajay was born in Altoona, Pennsylvania in 1919 to Syrian immigrant parents. Ajay grew up working at his father's candy store and bar in Altoona until he graduated from high school. From an early age, Ajay had a passion for art and sought to harness his artistic abilities when he made the decision to move to New York City to study at the Art Students League of New York, and the American Artists School in Manhattan.

While studying in New York, Ajay became close friends with Ad Reinhardt, the art director for the left-wing culture magazine The New Masses, who inspired him to begin working for the magazine. Ajay's contributions during the late 1930s and early 1940s to New Masses were significant. Along with Reinhardt, Ajay helped to shape the artistic direction of New Masses during a period where the magazine incurred financial hardships. Ajay's contributions of covers and cartoons helped to give New Masses a strong artistic presence despite the overall decline of the magazine during the period. A lack of funding helped precipitate Ajay's departure from New Masses and as the years went on, his support for Communism waned.

In the 1960s Ajay began to produce reliefs made of found objects. Later his often intricate constructions, created from tooled wood, gypsum and cast plastics, reminded may art historians of the sculptures of Louise Nevelson. In addition, many critics believe that Ajay's work illustrates religious architecture. It was during this time period when Ajay achieved considerable acclaim within the art community.

Ajay was a professor of visual arts at State University of New York at Purchase, N.Y from 1978 until his health began deteriorating towards the mid to late 1990s. Following a move back to Bethel, Connecticut, Ajay died of a cerebral hemorrhage in 1998 at the age of 78. He was survived by his wife, Betty Raymond. Ajay's work is contained in the Metropolitan Museum of Art, the Solomon R. Guggenheim Museum in Manhattan and the Hirshhorn Museum and Sculpture Garden in Washington. In addition, Ajay's work with New Masses is available in existing copies of the magazine found throughout the country.
