= Mor Abraham (15 November) =

- Venerated in: Syriac Orthodox Church
- Feast: 15 November

Mor Abraham is a saint of the Syriac Orthodox Church. His feast day is 15 November.

He is known from a single calendar of saints and his identification unclear. No church or monastery dedicated to him is known. He may have been venerated in Qaraqosh, where the East Syriac monastery of Bā ʿArba had a superior named Abraham mentioned by the Patriarch Ishoyahb III (r. 649–659).
