= Abraham of Farshut =

Coptic abbot and saint

Saint Abraham of Farshut

Monk
- Born: 5th or 6th century Farshut, Egypt
- Died: unknown Egypt
- Venerated in: Coptic Orthodox Church
- Feast: 12 February

Abraham of Farshut (c. 6th century) was an abbot and is a saint of the Coptic Church, and by extension all of the Oriental Orthodox Churches. His feast day in the calendar of saints of the Coptic Church is February 12.

== Life ==
He was born in Farshut, near the modern city of Huw. His parents, who were Christians and locally important figures, died when Abraham was twelve. The next year, Abraham tried unsuccessfully to persuade his sister to retain her virginity.

Thereafter, Abraham left to join the monastery of Pachomius at Pbow. This monastery was at the time under the direction of Pshintbahse. There Abraham devoted himself to trying to achieve the monastic ideals.

Abraham was elected abbot of the monastery on the death of Pshintbahse. Shortly thereafter, Justinian I requested that Abraham be brought to Constantinople, in an attempt to bring those monks who still rejected the decision of the Council of Chalcedon into communion with the greater church. The exact time of this event is unknown, but it is believed to have been between 535 and 548. Abraham brought with him four monks. Upon arrival, Justianian summoned them and informed them that they would either accept the decision of the council or lose their positions. Abraham refused to entertain the idea, and was removed as archimandrite.

Theodora tried to persuade Justinian to change his mind, seemingly to no avail. Abraham himself stated in a letter to his monks that he preferred to remain in exile rather than subscribe to a faith contrary to that of Athanasius. Abraham did return to Egypt, however, possibly due to persuasion from Theodora.

Pancharis had been appointed to replace Abraham as archimandrite at Pbow. Abraham first went to the monastery of Shenoute, where he made a copy of the Rule. Then he set up a new monastery at Farshut with two other monks from the monastery of Moses. The new monastery contained a well and a garden. The number of monks grew, however, making it necessary for the buildings to be expanded. He also founded a convent of nuns at roughly the same time.

Late in life, Abraham received a vision in which Pachomius, Petronius, and Shenouda the Archimandrite appeared to him, informing him of his upcoming death.

Some people have suggested that this Abraham might be identical to the Abraham of Scetes commemorated in the same calendar on January 4.
