= Abraham Baily =

American politician (1760–1825)

Member of the Pennsylvania Senate from the 2nd district
- In office 1815–1818
- Preceded by: new district
- Succeeded by: Samuel Cochran

Member of the Pennsylvania Senate from the Chester and Delaware counties district
- In office 1814–1815
- Preceded by: John Gemmill
- Succeeded by: district ended

Member of the Pennsylvania House of Representatives from the Chester County district
- In office 1808–1813

Personal details
- Born: September 5, 1760 West Bradford Township, Province of Pennsylvania
- Died: August 13, 1825 (aged 64)
- Party: Federalist
- Spouse(s): Phebe Carpenter (m. 1789) Rachel Carpenter (m. 1802)
- Children: 10
- Occupation: Politician; physician

Abraham Baily (September 5, 1760 – August 13, 1825) was an American politician and medical doctor from Pennsylvania. He served in the Pennsylvania House of Representatives, representing Chester County from 1808 to 1813. He also served in the Pennsylvania Senate from 1814 to 1818.

== Early life ==
Abraham Baily was born on September 5, 1760, in West Bradford Township, Pennsylvania, to Elizabeth (née Marshall) and Joel Baily. His father was a clockmaker. Baily received an education through teachers employed by his family. He studied medicine with his cousin Moses Marshall under Dr. Nicholas Way of Wilmington, Delaware. At the age of 17, he witnessed surgery at the Battle of Brandywine. He also attended lectures at the medical school in Philadelphia, but did not graduate.

== Career ==
After attending lectures, Baily was a surgeon on a privateer vessel-of-war that traveled to France. After returning, he practiced medicine until around 1789 with Humphrey Hill and Cadwallader Evans under the firm Baily, Hill & Evans. In 1794, he served as a captain against the Whiskey Rebellion. and worked at Andover Works in Sussex County, New Jersey. He moved to West Bradford Township, Pennsylvania, before 1800 and resumed practicing medicine. He operated a general store in Marshallton.

Baily was a Federalist. He served in the Pennsylvania House of Representatives, representing Chester County from 1808 to 1813. He represented Chester and Delaware counties in the Pennsylvania Senate from 1814 to 1815. He then represented both counties as the 2nd district from 1815 to 1818. At the time of his death, he was serving as justice of the peace.

== Personal life ==
Baily married Phebe Carpenter, daughter of John Carpenter, of West Bradford in 1789. They had six children. He married Rachel Carpenter, sister of Phebe, in 1802. They had four children.

Baily was a member of the committee that escorted Marquis de Lafayette on the Battle of Brandywine battlefield on July 26, 1825, during Lafayette's visit to the United States. During the day on horseback, Baily irritated his bladder and that led to his death on August 13, 1825.
