= Bioptics (device) =

Vision enhancement device

Bioptics, also known as a bioptic in the singular, and sometimes more formally termed a bioptic telescope, is a term for a pair of vision-enhancement lenses. They magnify between two and six times, and are used to improve distance vision for those with severely impaired eyesight, especially those with albinism. They can either be a combination of head-mounted eyeglasses (termed the "carrier") and binoculars, or be designed to attach to existing glasses. Some use monoculars which have small telescopes mounted on, in, or behind their regular lenses, so that they can look through either the regular lens or the telescope. Newer designs use smaller lightweight mini telescopes magnifying up to six times, which can be embedded into the spectacle glass and improve aesthetic appearance. The mini telescopic eyeglasses have been shown to be used in the treatment of nystagmus. In some jurisdictions, those with low vision may be permitted to drive automobiles when using Bioptics.

== Bioptic driving ==
Bioptic driving [sometimes written with uppercase O as biOptic, or hyphenated as bi-optic, to differentiate with other types of bioptic] is a method of driving that utilizes the patient's unmagnified vision in combination with intermittent spotting through a small telescopic system that improves the sharpness of the patient's far vision. Bioptic patients look through just their carrier lens about 95% of the time. When they want magnification, the patient quickly glances through the binocular portion to see details such as street signs, traffic lights and far distant objects. The brief use of the bioptic telescope is much like the quick look all drivers make into their rear view mirror. Bioptic driving requires careful fitting of the system followed by extensive training in both the use of the bioptic and behind-the-wheel driver's training.

Determining whether a visually impaired individual may become a bioptic driver requires a multidisciplinary approach. This may include the low vision specialist, physicians, driving rehabilitators, occupational therapists and orientation and mobility instructors. The process includes a number of checks and balances to rule out those patients who would not be safe, while identifying those with the potential to be a safe bioptic driver.
