= Abe Garver =

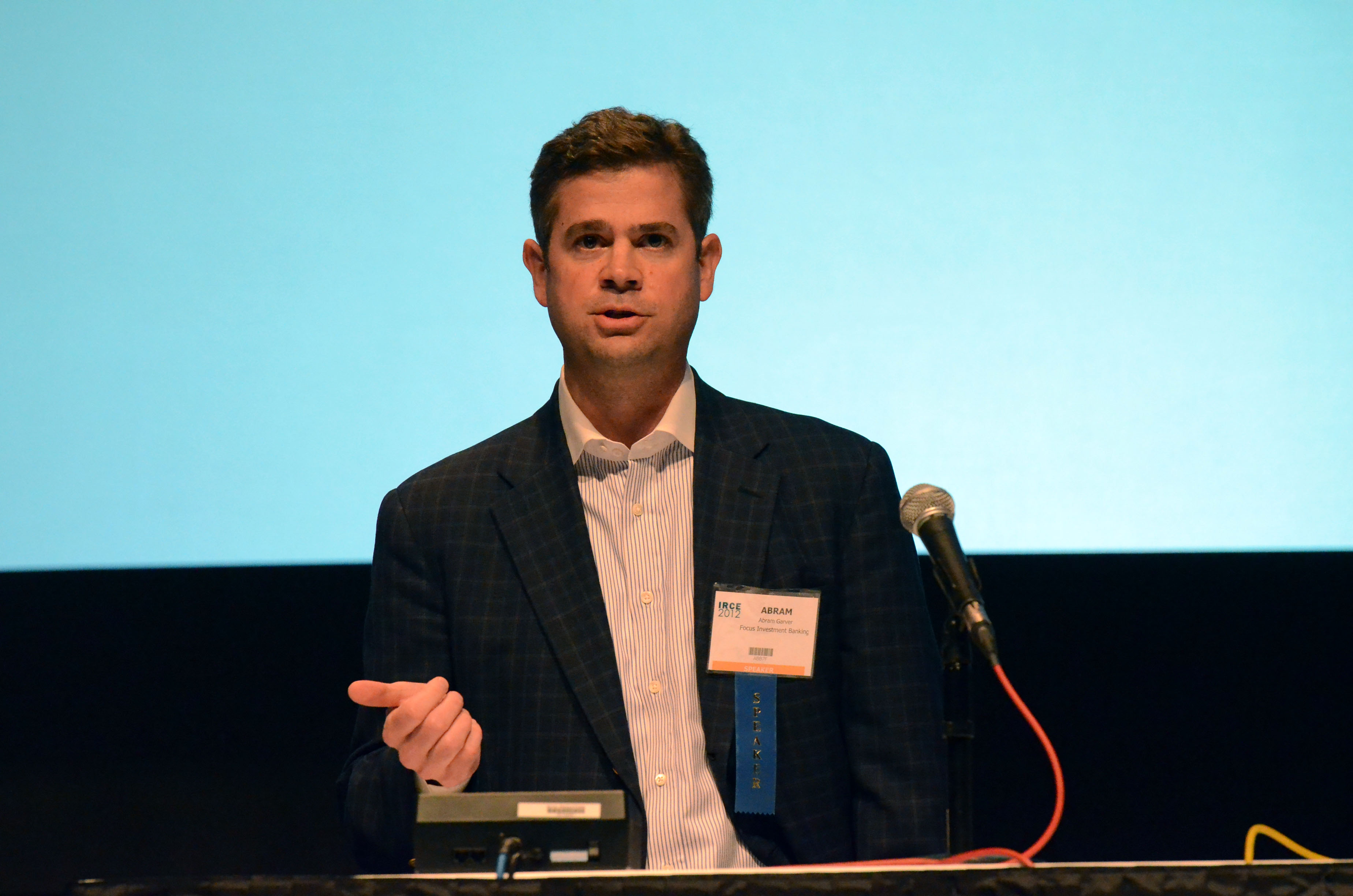
- Abe Garver presenting at the Internet Retailer Conference and Exhibition on June 5, 2012
- Education: University of Southern California, Manderson Graduate School
- Occupations: M&A Investment Banker, Television Commentator, and Speaker

Abe Garver is an American M&A investment banker, magazine contributor, television commentator, and conference speaker.

== Education ==
Abe Garver holds a Bachelor of Science in Business Administration from the University of Southern California Marshall School of Business, Master’s Degree in Finance from the Manderson Graduate School and is registered with the Financial Industry Regulatory Authority (FINRA) as a General Securities Representative (Series 7 and 63) and a Limited Representative – Investment Banking (Series 79).

== Career ==
Garver is the Managing Director of Focus Investment Banking. Previous to his position with Focus, he worked for BG Strategic Advisors, Merrill Lynch’s M&A Technology Group and Ernst & Young’s Business Valuation Group. In 2012 Garver was a featured speaker at the eighth Annual Internet Retailer Conference. His speaking topic was, Selling your Company: Preparing for the Pre- and Post-sale World.

== Media Contributor ==
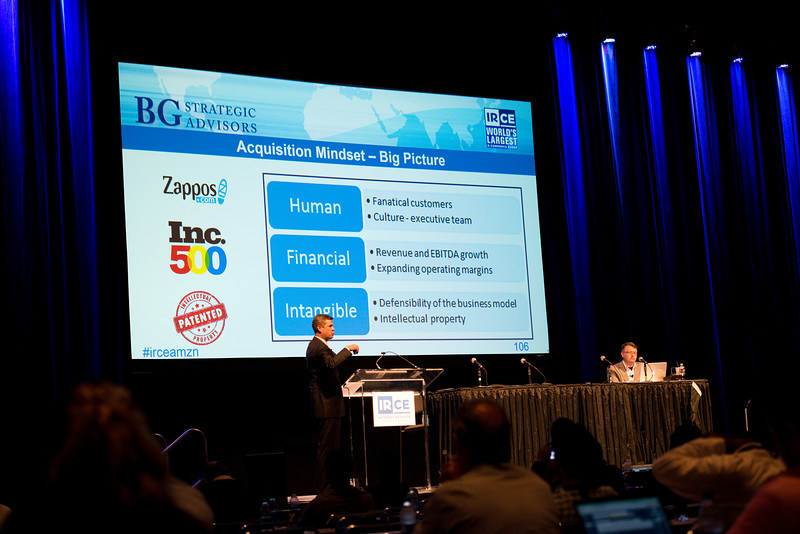
Abe Garver speaking at the Annual Internet Retailers Conference.

Abe Garver is also a business and financial contributor to Yahoo Finance, Seeking Alpha, MarketWatch, and Forbes.com. In Forbes Garver has written about e-commerce, m-commerce, M&A trends, valuation, Internet taxation, entrepreneurship, IPOs, and other topics. In Seeking Alpha, Garver has written about participant motivations in M&A transactions, repercussions of changes to long-term capital gains rates, and the importance of gross margin expansion to valuation. As an on-air contributor to Bloomberg Television, Garver has given advice on e-commerce industries, in addition to discussing his work helping to raise capital for or sell e-commerce companies. He has also discussed the concept of Showrooming and its effect on the health of both brick and mortar as well as online retailers. As an on-air contributor to Fox Business Network he has discussed strategies relating to selling technology companies as well as trends in electronic commerce, including TV-commerce, same day delivery by online stores, shoppable windows, and user specialization.

== Personal life ==
In addition to his professional pursuits, he is a member of The University Club of New York, Governor Emeritus of the University of Southern California Alumni Association and President Emeritus of the New York City Chapter.
