= Abraham Cykiert =

Australian Holocaust survivor, playwright and Zionist activist

Abraham Cykiert (26 April 1926 – 6 March 2009) was an Australian Holocaust survivor and Melburnian playwright and Zionist activist of the 1970s.

Abraham Cykiert was born 26 April 1926 in Łódź, Second Polish Republic. As a child, he was forced to live in Łódź Ghetto during the German occupation of Poland and then was forcibly moved first to Auschwitz death camp, from which he escaped, and then to Buchenwald. The translation of his diaries from Yiddish language was published after the war in The Manchester Guardian.

Cykiert died in Melbourne.

== Bibliography ==
- Cykiert, Avraham (January–February 1996). "Pilgrimage to self". First Person. Quadrant. 40 (1–2): 24–27.
