= Abe Piasek =

American public speaker (1928–2020)

Abram "Abe" Piasek (10 November 1928 – 15 January 2020) was a survivor of three slave labor camps in Poland and Germany, and a veteran of the U.S. Army. He shared his story of survival with thousands of students and people throughout North Carolina at schools, universities, libraries, and military bases. At the end of the war, Piasek (he preferred to be called "Abe" rather than Mr. Piasek) survived because the train he was on, which he later learned was bound for Dachau, was bombed on either side by allied forces.

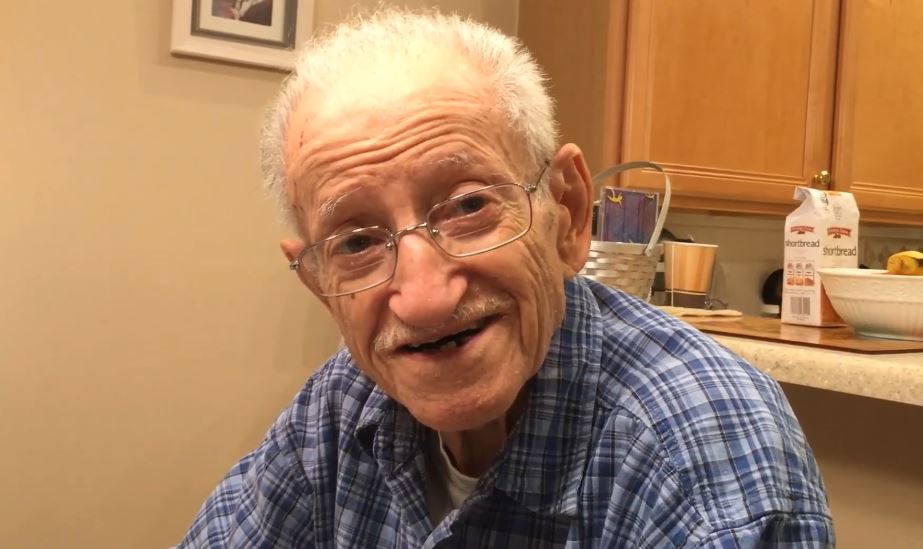
Abe Piasek photographed in his house in Raleigh in August, 2019. Abe would turn 91 in November.

Piasek was born in Białobrzegi, Kielce Voivodeship, Poland, in 1928, and came to the United States on August 3, 1947, a date he would celebrate every year with his family in the later years of his life.

His family was Jewish. Piasek, who was about to turn 11 years old when German forces invaded Poland in September, 1939, saw one of his good friends shot in front of him at close range by an SS soldier in 1941. His life would never be the same. In 1942, he was separated from his family and sent to a slave labor camp in Radom, about 20 miles south of his home town. He worked there from 1942-44, making pistols in a factory. In 1944, about 2,000 Jewish prisoners from Radom were marched 55 miles to a train station (Piasek estimated that of the 6,000 people on that march, 1,000 died) where they were transported on a cattle car to the Auschwitz concentration camp. At Auschwitz there was a selection, and the men judged able to work were sent on a 450-mile cattle car journey to the Vaihingen concentration camp.

After a few months of backbreaking work hauling concrete and other heavy building materials, Piasek and the others from Radom were sent on a cattle car to the nearby Hessental camp, where he worked to maintain German infrastructure -- mainly repairing craters made in German air strips by Allied bombing raids and repairing damaged railroad ties. In Spring of 1945, as Allied troops approached, he was put on a train to transport him deeper into Germany. Allied bombing raids stopped his train and allowed him to escape. Piasek later learned his train was bound for Dachau, and had the train not been stopped, he likely would have been killed at Dachau.

After World War II ended, Piasek spent two years in displaced persons camps in Germany before coming to the US in the summer of 1947. He lived for 28 years in Connecticut, where he learned English, met his wife of 63 years, Shirley, and learned to be a baker. He owned Richard's Bake Shop in Wethersfield, just south of Hartford. In 1975, Piasek and his wife moved to California, where he lived for more than 15 years. In 1991, he retired to Florida. Once the Berlin Wall came down, Piasek and took his family on a trip back to Poland, where they visited Bialobrzegi -- a place Abe had not seen in more than 45 years. A few years after the movie Schindler's List came out in 1993, Piasek was interviewed about his Holocaust experience at his house in Boca Raton by the USC Shoah Foundation in 1995. That was the first time he spoke at any length about his time in the camps. He slowly began, after more than 50 years of silence, to tell his story to groups of students in Florida.

Piasek and his wife, Shirley, moved to North Carolina in 2009. After Shirley died in 2012, Piasek spent more and more time sharing his story with schools, military bases, libraries, and community centers throughout the state.

In 2015, Piasek and other survivors were reunited with one of the U.S. soldiers who helped liberate them 70 years earlier.

In April 2019, Piasek accompanied a group of high school students on a visit to the U.S. Holocaust Memorial Museum in Washington, DC. Though he had long been a member of the museum, this was his first visit there. While at the museum, Piasek went to the cattle car on the third floor and narrated his liberation for his great-grandchildren and the other students on the trip.

In late May 2019, Piasek gave a talk for nearly two hours at a church in Faison, NC, describing his story.

Piasek fell while doing work in his garage in September, 2019, and was hospitalized for several weeks. While in the hospital, he took the opportunity to share his story with doctors, nurses, and patients at Wake Med Hospital (despite being in a neck brace and a wheelchair at the time).

Piasek died on January 15, 2020, at the age of 91.

A few days before he died, Piasek asked the teacher who organized the trip to the Holocaust Museum in April 2019 to keep telling his story. So far, that teacher, Steve Goldberg, has shared Abe's story more than 180 times, and with more than 10,000 people.
