= Abe Mitchell (baseball) =

American baseball player

- First baseman

Negro league baseball debut
- 1933, for the Akron Black Tyrites

Last appearance
- 1933, for the Akron Black Tyrites
- Stats at Baseball Reference

Teams
- Akron Black Tyrites (1933)

Abraham Mitchell is an American former Negro league first baseman who played in the 1930s.

Mitchell played for the Akron Black Tyrites in 1933. In nine recorded games, he posted five hits in 35 plate appearances.
