= Mana of Beth Parsaye =

4th-century Christian martyr

Mana of Bet-Parsaje was a Christian martyr under Shapur II, in November, 339. Mana was tortured and martyred being flayed at Bet-Nikator.

== Companion martyrs ==
Mana was martyred alongside two of his companions,

- Abraham of Bet-Parsajje. He was blinded by red-hot nails and martyred at Bet-Nikator
- Simon of Bet-Parsaje. He was shot by arrows and martyred at Bet-Nikator

There is no reference to their ever having had a feast day in known literature.
