= Abe Watson =

Australian rules footballer

Personal information
- Full name: Albert Victor Watson
- Born: 11 June 1871; Casterton, Victoria
- Died: 29 November 1932 (aged 61); Fremantle, Western Australia

Playing career^{1}
| Years | Club | Games (Goals) |
| 1898 | Essendon | 2 (0) |
- ^{1} Playing statistics correct to the end of 1898.

Albert Victor 'Abe' Watson (11 June 1871 – 29 November 1932) was an Australian rules footballer who played with Essendon in the Victorian Football League (VFL).

He joined the 51st Battalion during World War I and was captured as a prisoner of war during the Battle of Mouquet Farm.
