= James of Manug =

James of Manug was a Christian martyr.

He was a native of Manug, of the Absu area of Lower Egypt. He studied at Absu. During a period of Christian persecution he professed belief in Christianity at Farama. With two other believers, Abraham and John of Samanoud, two natives of Gamndui, he was martyred. His tongue was cut out, he was blinded and then, finally beheaded.

Their feast day is celebrated on August 10 in the Coptic Church, or August 11 in the Ethiopian Orthodox Tewahedo Church.
