= Abraham of Nethpra =

Assyrian monk

Saint Abraham of Nethpra
- Born: Beith-Nethpra, Adiabene
- Died: 6th Century
- Venerated in: Assyrian Church of the East
- Feast: 13 March

Abraham of Nethpra (died 6th century) was a monk of the Assyrian Church of the East.

He was born in Beith-Nethpra in Adiabene. He became a hermit there and, after returning from Egypt, returned to hermeticism. He lived for thirty years in a cave before dying in the 6th century.

He changed the religious habit of the monks of the Church of the East to make it easier to distinguish them from similar Miaphysite monks.

He is regarded as a saint of the Assyrian Church. His feast day is March 13.
