= Abraham of Bulgaria =

Orthodox Christian saint (died 1229)

Saint Abraham of Bulgaria
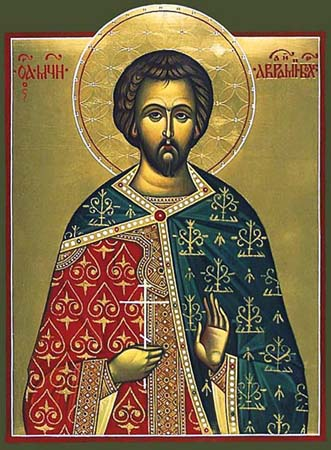
- Saint Abraham of Bulgaria

Martyr
- Born: 12th century Volga Bulgaria
- Died: 1 April 1229; Bolghar, Volga Bulgaria
- Venerated in: Eastern Orthodox Church; Roman Catholic Church
- Feast: 1 April; 9 March (translation of relics)

Abraham of Bulgaria (Russian: Авраамий Болгарский; died April 1, 1229) was a Christian convert from Islam later who was martyred for his faith and is venerated as a saint in the Eastern Orthodox Church.

== Life ==
He was born in Volga Bulgaria, amongst the Muslim Volga Bulgars in what is now Tatarstan, Russia. He grew to become an Islamic merchant, and was good and kindly towards the destitute. He later converted to Christianity. Muslims persistently tried to persuade him to renounce Christ, but Abraham was unshakable in his faith and was truncated by the sword (quartered) for his conversion by his compatriots on 1 April c. 1229 at the Volga bank. Afterwards, they also decapitated him. The saint was buried by Russian merchants in the Christian cemetery in Bolghar, the capital of Volga Bulgaria. Georgy Vsevolodovich, the grand prince of Vladimir, ordered the transfer of the body of Abraham to Vladimir.

Soon, according to the chronicle testimony, the city of Bulgar (Bolgar) was burnt as a punishment "for the blood of the martyr of Christ". On the spot of execution of Abraham of Bulgaria a healing spring appeared. A local legend says that the first person to be healed by this source was a Muslim man.

His relics are venerated at Vladimir on the Klyazma. The Laurentian Chronicle contains the registry about this event that took place on 9 March 1230.

== Origin and occupation ==
There is very little information about the life of Abraham of Bulgaria.

Basic information about him is contained in the chronicles and written histories of the 17th century. The oldest source reporting about Abraham of Bulgaria is the Laurentian Codex (14th century).

The Chronicler said that Abraham of Bulgaria was "of another language, not Russian" (the name before baptism is unknown). Probably, he came from the Bulgarians ("Volga Bulgarians", "Kama Bulgarians"), was growing up in the Muslim environment and originally professed Islam.

Abraham of Bulgaria was a rich and notable merchant; he traded in the cities of the Volga region.

== Veneration ==
He was canonised as a saint and martyr by the Russian Orthodox Church. His feast day is celebrated on 1 April, and he is also commemorated on 9 March, the commemoration of the translation of his relics.

== External sources ==
- Holweck, F. G. A Biographical Dictionary of the Saints. St. Louis, MO: B. Herder Book Co. 1924.
