= Abraham of the High Mountain =

4th-century Christian saint

Saint
- Died: 399 modern Turkey
- Feast: April 18 (in Syriac Church)

Abraham of the High Mountain (died 399) was a teacher of Barsauma. Abraham was not only a monk but a miracle-worker of the monastery of the High Mountain which is located to north of Mount Izla. He founded a monastery near Midyat where the stylite Abel was.

A monastery was dedicated in Abraham's name at Garbia near in Tur Abdin. His biography was written by a disciple of his, Stephen. His feast day is April 18.

== External sources ==
- Holweck, F. G. A Biographical Dictionary of the Saints. St. Louis, Missouri, United States: B. Herder Book Co. 1924.
- Jeanne-Nicole Saint-Laurent et al., Abraham of the High Mountain (text) — ܐܒܪܗܡ in Bibliotheca Hagiographica Syriaca Electronica last modified November 5, 2015, http://syriaca.org/work/1135.
