= Abraham of Arbela =

Bishop of Arbela

Saint Abraham of Arbela
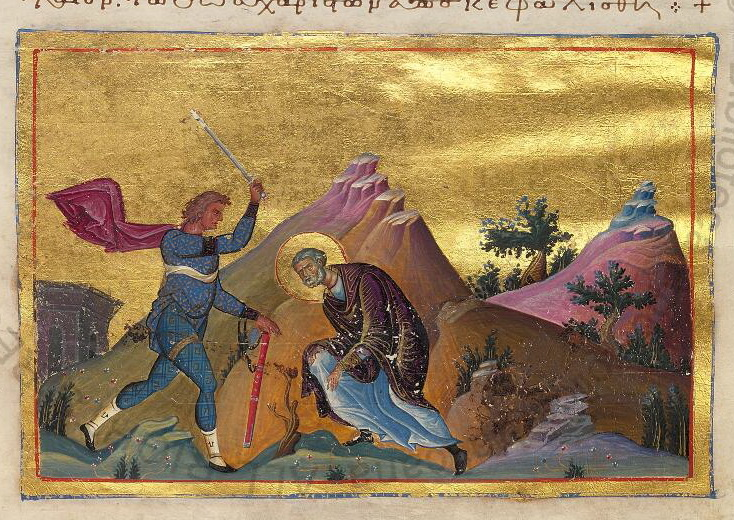

Saint and Martyr
- Died: 345; Telman
- Venerated in: Syrian Orthodox Church
- Feast: February 4 and 5, January 31
- Attributes: sword near him

Abraham of Arbela (died c. 345) (also known as Abramius) was a bishop of Arbela in Sassanid Persia.

During the imprisonment of Bishop Ioannis of Arbela, he was appointed as his deputy by the local religious community. The church historian Sozomen (died c. 450) described in the second book of his Christian Church, among other things, the persecutions and tortures that took place in the Persian Empire under Shapur II (died 379). In paragraph 8 of chapter 8 he says:

At that same period of government [of Sapor] the blood of an almost innumerable multitude of bishops, priests, deacons, lower clergy, religious and consecrated virgins, received the crown of martyrdom.

Among the names he had been able to retrieve, the name of Bishop Abraham of Arbela also appeared. He was tortured and later beheaded under Shapur II because he refused to worship the sun in Telman. The saint is venerated on February 5.

He has two feast days – February 4 and 5, but January 31 in the Catholic Church.

== External sources ==
- Holweck, F. G. A Biographical Dictionary of the Saints. St. Louis, MO: B. Herder Book Co. 1924.
- The Bénédictins of Ramsgate 'Ten Thousand Saints, Hagiographic Dictionary' Brepols, 1991. ISBN 2-503-50058-7
- Kirschbaum, Engelbert (established). Published by Wolfgang Braunfels' Encyclopedia of Christian Iconography. First to eighth volume 'Rome / Freiburg / Basel / Vienna, Herder, 1990. ISBN 3-451-21806-2
