= Abraham of Clermont =

Saint Abraham of Clermont
- Died: c. 479; Clermont
- Venerated in: Catholic Church, Syrian Orthodox Church
- Feast: June 15

Abraham of Clermont (died c. 479) was the founder and abbot of the monastery of St.Cyriacus in Clermont-Ferrand.

He was born in Byzantine Syria, along the Euphrates River and was of Persian origins. He later left for Byzantine Egypt, to visit some of the hermits there. On the way to Egypt, he was captured and held a prisoner for five years. After escaping, he went to Gaul and founded a new community of monks near the basilica of Saint Cyricus not far from St. Illidius church (St.Allyre) near Clermont. He died around 479. Apollinaris Sedonius, bishop of Clermont wrote an epitaph on the grave of St. Abraham from which we learned some facts from saint's life.

== Veneration ==
His feast day is celebrated on June 15. He is also a patron saint against fever.

== External sources ==
- Holweck, F. G. A Biographical Dictionary of the Saints. St. Louis, MO: B. Herder Book Co. 1924.
- Acta Sanctorum June 3:534–536. r. aigrain, Catholicisme 1:57. j. l. baudot and l. chaussin, Vies des saints et des bienhereux selon l'ordre du calendrier avec l'historique des fêtes (Paris 1935–56) 6:251–252.
