= Saint Abraham (Ethiopian) =

Abraham

Saint
- Venerated in: Ethiopian Orthodox Tewahedo Church
- Feast: May 5

Abraham is a saint of the Ethiopian Orthodox Tewahedo Church. His feast day is celebrated May 5.

== Sources ==
- Holweck, F. G. A Biographical Dictionary of the Saints. St. Louis, Missouri, US: B. Herder Book Co. 1924.
