= Abraham of Paleostrov =

Saint Abraham of Paleostrov

Venerable
- Born: ?
- Died: c. 1460; Island of Paley, Lake Onega
- Venerated in: Eastern Orthodox Church
- Canonized: 19th century by Archbishop Sergius (Spassky)
- Feast: 21 August (N.S 3 September)

Abraham of Paleostrov (Russian: Авраамий Палеостровский, romanized: Avraamy Paleostrovsky; died c. 1460), also known as Avraamy Olonetsky, is an Eastern Orthodox saint, who was a hegumen (abbot) of the Monastery of the Nativity of the Blessed Virgin Mary in Paleostrov, Russia. Abraham was a disciple of Cornelius of Paleostrov and one of his successors as abbot of his monastery.

== Life and ministration ==
From the Legend of the Life of the Reverend Cornelius of Paleostrov, it is known that Abraham came to Cornelius after he had settled in a cave on the island of Paley on Lake Onega. The Paleostrovsky Monastery was founded by Cornelius in the early 15th century. Abraham together with other disciples of Cornelius participated in the construction of the churches of the Nativity of the Blessed Virgin, of Elijah the Prophet and Nicholas the Wonderworker, the caves for the monks. In the lifetime of Cornelius he appointed Abraham as his successor. The Reverend Cornelius died about 1420, and Abraham buried him in the cave of the island of Paley. Later, the relics of Cornelius Paleostrovsky were transferred to the Church of the Nativity of the Blessed Virgin. The monk Abraham died in the middle of the 15th century. He was buried in the Church of the Nativity of the Virgin near Cornelius.

== Veneration ==
The date of the local canonization of Abraham Paleostrovsky is unknown. In the XVII century, the Palaeostrovsky Monastery was twice devastated, as a result of which most of the archive was lost. The local veneration of Abraham and Cornelius was documented at the beginning of the 19th century. Archbishop Sergius (Spassky) assigned the feast day of both saints - 21 August. In 1974, Abraham Paleostrovsky was included in the Synaxis of the Karelian Saints, and in 1981 - in the Synaxis of the Novgorod Saints.

His feast day is celebrated on 21 August in the Russian Orthodox Church.

== External sources ==
- Корецкий В. И. Новгородские грамоты XV в. из архива Палеостровского монастыря (Novgorod letters of the XV century from the archive of the Paleostrovsky Monastery) // АЕ за 1957 г. Moscow, 1958. pp. 437–451.
