= Leontine martyrs =

Group of Armenian clergymen and martyrs

The Leontine Martyrs (Old Armenian: Ղեւոնդեանք, romanized: Łewondeank῾, Ղևոնդյանք Ghevondyank’ in modern Armenian) were a group of nine Armenian clergymen who were who were killed after a long period of captivity in Persia in the 5th century AD. They were executed by the order of the Sasanian king Yazdegerd II in 455, five years after the insurrection led by Vardan Mamikonian. The group is named after Leontius of Vanand (Ghevond Vanandetsi).

== Martyrs ==
=== Leontius of Vanand ===
A high level priest also known as St. Ghevond (in Armenian Սուրբ Ղևոնդ). Highly educated, he studied under Mesrop Mashtots. He was fluent in Persian and worked as a translator. Leontius opposed attempts by the Magi and Sassanid Dynasty, to forcibly convert the Armenian people to Zoroastrianism, As an advisor to Vardan Mamikonian, he was present at the Battle of Avarayr in 451. He was subsequently captured, imprisoned, and beheaded.

Others imprisoned and executed were:

- Joseph I of Armenia or St. Hovsep I (in Armenian Սբ. Հովսեփ Ա Հողոցմեցի), catholicos of Armenia (437–452)
- Sahak of Syunik Rshtuni (in Armenian Սահակ եպս. Ռշտունյաց) - a bishop
- Tatik of Basen (in Armenian Բասենյաց Թաթիկ եպիսկոպոս) - a bishop
- Mushe or Mushegh (in Armenian Մուշեղ քահանայ) - A priest
- Arshen (in Armenian Արշեն երեց) - a priest
- Samuel (in Armenian Սամուէլ քահանայ) - a priest

Plus deacons Kachach and Abraham.

== Survivors ==
=== Abraham of Arazd ===
Saint Abraham of Arazd

Priest, Confessor, Hermit
- Died: 5th century AD
- Venerated in: Armenian Apostolic Church
- Feast: 20 December

Abraham of Arrazd was an Armenian priest and a disciple of the Leontine martyrs. Like his teachers, he was subjected to prolonged torture, but unlike them, was eventually set free. He afterward left society to become a hermit, remaining one until his death in the 5th century. He is regarded as a saint by the Armenian Church, with a feast day of December 20.

== Veneration ==
St. Ghevond the Priest and His Companions are commemorated as saints in the Armenian Apostolic Church. The day of the Feast of St. Ghevond the Priest and His Companions is July 31. It is also considered the day of the clergy in the Armenian Church and their office is celebrated on the Tuesday after the western Sexagesima, as they are regarded as the patron saints of the Armenian clergy.
