= Abraham of Egypt =

4th century monk and hermit of Egypt

saint (monk and hermit)
- Born: Minuf, Egypt
- Venerated in: Coptic Orthodox Church
- Feast: May 21

Abraham of Egypt or Abraham of Minuf was a fourth-century monk and hermit of Egypt, is known only from the Synaxarion.

He was a native of Minuf in the Delta, born of Christian parents who held an important position in the world. We do not know at what age he joined the monastic life. From the ancient text we know only that "when he grew up, he went off to the land of Akhmim, to join the great Pachomius, who gave him the religious habit." He remained there for twenty-three years.

Then he asked the permission to leave and live as a hermit in a cavern, where he stayed for sixteen years, leaving it only to receive communion every two or three years. He had at his service only a secular brother who was making fishing nets, and selling them to buy beans for him, giving alms with the rest of the money.

When Abraham felt his death coming, he sent for Abba Theodore, disciple of Pachomius, then he lay down facing the east. He was buried by the monks in the cemetery of the monastery. The mention of Theodore indicates that Abraham lived at the end of the fourth century.

He is considered a saint in the Coptic Church, who hold his feast day on May 21.
