= Abraham of Scetis =

Egyptian Coptic saint

Saint Abraham of Scetis

Monk
- Born: 4th century Egypt
- Died: 399; Djirdjeh, Egypt
- Venerated in: Coptic Orthodox Church
- Feast: 4th of January

Abraham of Scetis was a monk who became a saint of the Coptic Church.

He was born the son of a wealthy landowner in Egypt. He is said to have had a vision of Christ riding the chariot of the Cherubim. He died after an 18 year illness at Djirdjeh. His cell, called Dshabih, later became a Christian shrine. His feast day in the Coptic Church is January 4.

== See also ==
- Desert Fathers
- Or of Nitria
