= Abraham of Smolensk =

Russian monk and priest (c. 1150 - 1222)

Saint Abraham of Smolensk
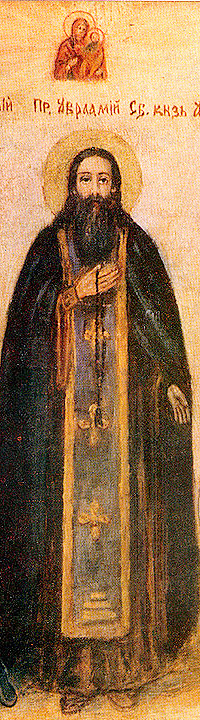
- Russian icon.

Priest
- Born: 1150 or 1172; Smolensk, Russia
- Died: c. 1222; Smolensk, Russia
- Venerated in: Eastern Orthodoxy
- Canonized: 1549, Tsardom of Russia by Macarius, Metropolitan of Moscow
- Feast: 21 August
- Attributes: Monastic habit Prayer rope Cross
- Patronage: Smolensk

Abraham of Smolensk (Russian: Авраамий Смоленский; 1150 or 1172 - c. 1222) was a Russian monk and priest. He resided at the Bogoroditzkaja convent and was regarded as a miracle worker. He engaged in extensive preaching and biblical studies and is viewed as a notable figure in the pre-Mongol Russia.

== Life ==
Abraham was said to be born either in 1150 or 1172 to nobles; he was orphaned in his childhood and then decided to abandon his fortune to pursue the austere and poor religious life.

He is described as being a man of stern and militant character who kept the idea of the Last Judgement in the minds of himself and others. He was popular among the faithful as he worked for the sick and the troubled. He was noted for his tenderness with those coming to him for his help and his advice. He was less popular with the other priests who were jealous of his successes. This tension led to several moral and theological charges being brought against him and it led to the local bishop taking action against him which cast a cloud over his character for some time and an order for him to stop preaching. But his withdrawal made him no friends either for there were clerics who kept on viewing him with suspicion.

The bishop later reopened the case against him and acquitted him against the charges leveled against him while making him the abbot of the smaller and impoverished convent of the Mother of God in the area. He spent the rest of his life there and died there circa 1222. His disciple Ephraem's biographical account of Abraham has survived.

== Sainthood ==
He is venerated as a saint in the Eastern Orthodox Church. The Russian Orthodox Church canonized him as a saint at the 1549 Makaryev Sobors.
