= List of saints in the Russian Orthodox Church =

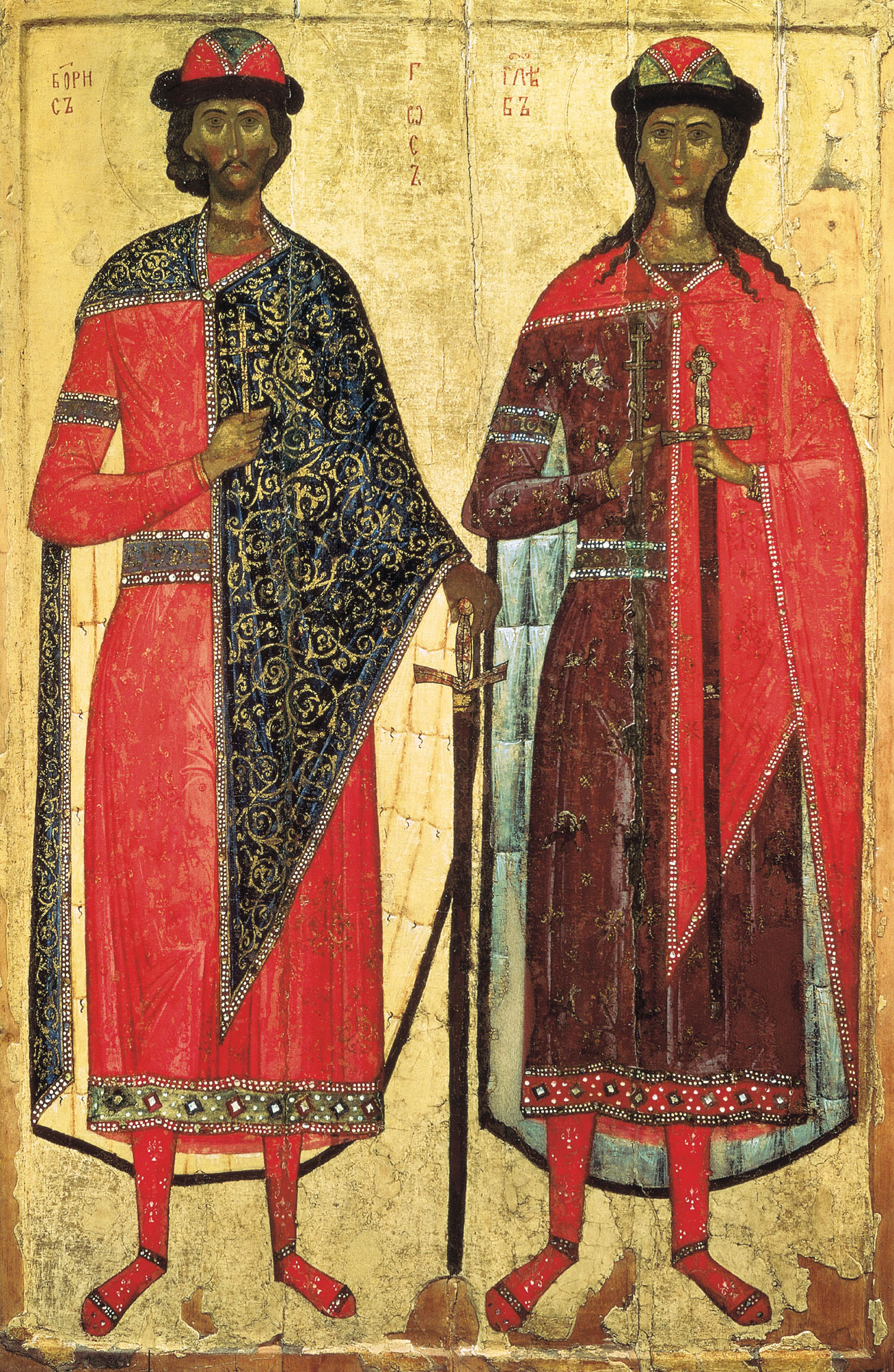
Boris and Gleb, the first saints canonized in Kievan Rus'

This list of saints in the Russian Orthodox Church includes only people canonized as saints by the Russian Orthodox Church, or the preceding Metropolis of Kiev and all Rus'. The saints are alphabetized by their first names.

Macarius, Metropolitan of Moscow, canonized a total of 39 saints at two church councils held in 1547 and 1549, and later added eight more.

== Alphabetical list ==
=== A ===
- Abraham and Coprius of Gryazovets 15th century founders of the monastery in Gryazovets
- Abraham the Laborious, 12th-and-13th-century monks from the Kiev Pechersk Lavra
- Abraham of Bulgaria (d. 1229), Muslim-born convert from Volga Bulgaria, killed for his conversion, martyr
- Abraham of Galich, hegumen, founder of four monasteries on Lake Chukhloma in Kostroma Oblast
- Abraham of Mirozha, a 12th-century abbot of the Mirozhsky Monastery at Pskov
- Abraham of Rostov, founder of the Abraham Epiphany Monastery in Rostov
- Abraham of Smolensk, 12th-century monk and icon-painter, justified by a miracle and acquitted against the charges leveled against him
- Adrian of Poshekhonye, monk and iconographer, founder and first hegumen of the Dormition Monastery in Poshekhonye
- Agapetus of the Kiev Caves, 11th-century monk and doctor from the Kiev Pechersk Lavra, who healed Prince Vladimir Monomach
- Alexander Hotovitzky, Orthodox missionary in the United States, martyr executed by Bolsheviks
- Alexander Nevsky, Prince of Novgorod and Grand Prince of Vladimir, known for his command during the Battle of the Neva and the Battle of the Ice, patron saint and considered by a poll to be the greatest person in Russian history
- Alexander Schmorell, martyr, one of the founders of White Rose, active against Germany's Nazi regime
- Alexander Svirsky, monk in Valaam Monastery and founder of Alexander-Svirsky Monastery
- Empress Alexandra Feodorovna, wife of Tsar Nicholas II of Russia and the last tsarina of Russia, murdered during the Russian Civil War with her entire family, all of whom were canonized as "new-martyrs"
- Tsarevich Alexei Nikolaevich of Russia, only son of Tsar Nicholas II of Russia and last tsarevich of Russia, murdered during the Russian Civil War with his entire family, all of whom were canonized as "new-martyrs"
- Alexis of Wilkes-Barre, a missionary in the American Midwest who converted approximately 20,000 Eastern Rite Catholics to the Russian Orthodox Church
- Alexius, Metropolitan of Kiev and all Rus' (1354–1378), de facto regent of Moscow during Prince Dmitry Donskoy's minority
- Alypius of the Caves, 11th-century monk from the Kiev Pechersk Lavra, one of the first Russian icon painters
- Ambrose of Optina, starets of the Optina Monastery, founder of the Shamordino Convent
- Ambrosius Gudko, bishop of Sarapul and Yelabuga before the Russian Revolution of 1917
- Grand Duchess Anastasia Nikolaevna of Russia, youngest daughter of Tsar Nicholas II of Russia, murdered during the Russian Civil War with her entire family, all of whom were canonized as "new-martyrs"
- Andrew Rublev, most famous Russian icon-painter, author of the Trinity
- Andronic Nikolsky, Archbishop of Perm, hieromartyr killed during the Russian Revolution of 1917
- Anna of Kashin, medieval princess, wife of Mikhail of Tver, twice canonized as a holy protectress of women who suffer the loss of relatives, having lost all her relatives in wars with the Golden Horde
- Anthony, John, and Eustathios, martyrs executed by pagan Lithuanian Grand Duke Algirdas
- Anthony of Kiev, co-founder of the Kiev Pechersk Lavra, the first monastery in Kievan Rus'
- Anthony of Siya, founder of the Antonievo-Siysky Monastery
- Arsenius Matseyevich, Archbishop of Rostov, who protested against by Empress Catherine the Great's confiscation of the church's land in 1764, then deprived of his office and imprisoned in a fortress until his death
- Artemius of Verkola, 16th-century child saint whose body showed no sign of decay
- Athanasius of Brest, martyr killed by Catholics for opposition to the Union of Brest in the Polish–Lithuanian Commonwealth
- Athanasius Sakharov, Bishop of Kovrov, leader of the Catacomb Church but who joined the Russian Orthodox Church in 1945

=== B ===
- Barbara Yakovleva, nun and Sister of Mercy in the convent of Grand Duchess Elizabeth Fyodorovna, killed by the Bolsheviks along with several Romanov princes
- Barlaam of Chikoy, 19th-century missionary in Transbaikal
- Barlaam of Kiev, first abbot of the Kiev Pechersk Lavra
- Barlaam of Khutyn, founder of the Khutyn Monastery in the Novgorod Republic
- Barsanuphius of Optina, archimandrite, starets of Optina Pustyn
- Basil the Blessed, "fool for Christ" who gave his name to St. Basil's Cathedral on the Red Square (actually the correct name is the Cathedral of the Intercession or Pokrovsky Sobor)
- Basil Kalika, 14th-century icon-painter and Archbishop of Novgorod who was elected by the veche and reinvigorated the office
- Basil of Pavlovsky Posad, mid-19th-century factory worker who converted multiple Old Believers to Russian Orthodoxy
- Benjamin of Petrograd, Metropolitan of Petrograd
- Boris and Gleb, children of Vladimir the Great, the first saints canonized by the Metropolis of Kiev and all Rus', a predecessor of the Russian Orthodox Church

=== C ===
- Charitina of Lithuania, noblewoman from the pagan Grand Duchy of Lithuania who became a nun in Novgorod
- Constantine of Murom, 11th-century Prince of Murom who baptized Muromian pagans
- Cyprian, Metropolitan of Kiev and all Rus', who briefly united the churches of the Principality of Moscow and the Grand Duchy of Lithuania
- Cyrill of Turov, Bishop of Turov, one of the first and finest theologians and writers of Kievan Rus'

=== D ===
- Daniel of Moscow, first Prince of Moscow, founder of the first Muscovite monasteries (Epiphany Monastery and Danilov Monastery)
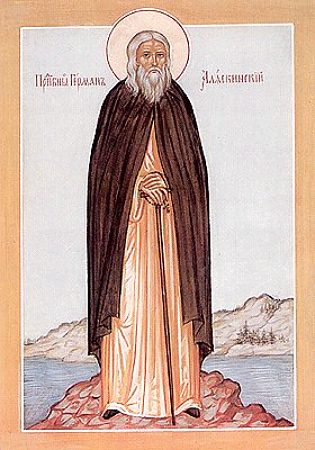
  Herman of Alaska
- Daumantas of Pskov, Prince of Pskov,who made the city autonomous from the Novgorod Republic, and defended Pskov from the Livonian Order
- Demetrius Donskoy, Prince of Moscow, who commanded the winning side in the 1380 Battle of Kulikovo
- Demetrius of Rostov, a leading opponent of the Caesaropapist reform of the Russian Orthodox Church promoted by Theofan Prokopovich and Peter I, major religious writer
- Demetrius of Uglich, son of Ivan the Terrible, mysteriously died or killed, later impersonated by the impostors False Dmitry I and False Dmitry II during the Time of Troubles

=== E ===
- Grand Duchess Elizabeth Feodorovna, older sister of the last Russian empress, Alexandra Feodorovna; who, after her husband was killed by revolutionaries, became a prominent nun and founded the Marfo-Mariinsky Convent
- Ephraim of Pereyaslavl, Metropolitan of Kiev and all Rus' in the late 11th century
- Epiphanius the Wise, a monk from Rostov, disciple of Saint Sergius of Radonezh, and hagiographer of Saint Sergius and Saint Stephen of Perm
- Eudoxia of Moscow, wife of Dmitry Donskoy, healer, and foundress of the Ascension Monastery and the Church of the Nativity of the Theotokos, the oldest surviving building in Moscow
- Euphrosyne of Polatsk, granddaughter of a prince of Polotsk, Vseslav, and owner of the Cross of Saint Euphrosyne
- Euphrosynus of Pskov, 15th-century monk from Snetogorsky Monastery who founded a monastic community near Pskov
- Euthymius II of Novgorod, Archbishop of Novgorod in the 15th century, and a major patron of arts

=== F ===
- Feodor Kuzmich, starets who according to a legend was in fact Alexander I of Russia who faked his death to become a hermit
- Fyodor Ushakov, the most illustrious Russian admiral of the 18th century, who never lost a single ship in 43 battles

=== G ===
- Gabriel of Belostok, 17th-century child saint
- Gennadius of Novgorod, compiler of the first complete codex of the Bible in Slavic, the Gennady Bible
- German of Kazan and Svyazhsk, second bishop of Kazan
- Gury of Kazan, prelate of the Russian Orthodox Church who became the first archbishop of Kazan and Svyazhsk

=== H ===
- Herman of Alaska, one of the first Eastern Orthodox missionaries to the New World, and patron saint of the Americas
- Herman of Solovki, one of the founders of the Solovetsky Monastery
- Herman of Valaam, preacher of Christianity to Karelians and Finns, and co-founder of the Valaam Monastery
- Hermogenes Dolganyov, hieromartyr, Bishop of Tobolsk and Siberia, killed during the Russian Revolution
- Hilarion of Kiev, first non-Greek Metropolitan of Kiev and author of the Sermon on Law and Grace, one of the earliest known Slavonic texts
- Hilarion Troitsky, Archbishop of Vereya, considered one of the greatest Russian theologians of the early 20th century

=== I ===
- Igor II of Kiev, Grand Prince of Kiev turned monk, and martyr
- Prince Igor Constantinovich of Russia, member of the Romanov family, killed by Bolsheviks
- Ilia Muromets, medieval warrior, and in later life monk of Kiev Pechersk Lavra.
- Ignatius Bryanchaninov, Bishop of Caucassus, and major 19th-century spiritual writer
- Innocent of Alaska, missionary to Alaska and Metropolitan of Moscow
- Innocent of Irkutsk, missionary to Siberia and first bishop of Irkutsk
- Ioakim Korsunianin, first bishop of Novgorod the Great and builder of the original wooden Saint Sophia Cathedral in Novgorod
- Irenarch of Rostov, 16th-century hermit of Rostov, mystic and visionary, and companion of John the Hairy
- Isaiah of Rostov, 11th-century missionary and second bishop of Rostov

=== J ===
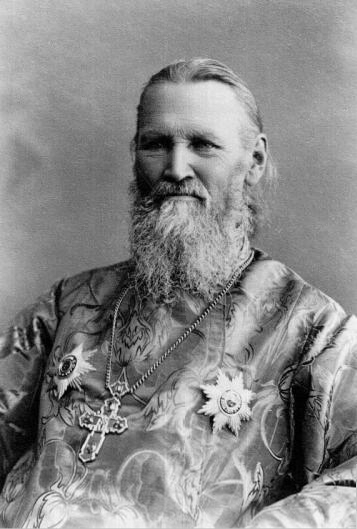
John of Kronstadt

- Jacob Netsvetov, Russian native of the Aleutian Islands who became a priest and missionary among Alaskan peoples
- Joasaph of Belgorod, 18th-century bishop of Belgorod, canonized in 1911 for miraculous cures attributed to his relics
- Job of Maniava, defender of Russian Orthodoxy in Ukraine and founder of Manyava Skete
- Job of Pochayiv, defender of Russian Orthodoxy in Ukraine, prominent hegumen, and builder of Pochayiv Lavra
- John the Hairy, 16th-century yurodivy (fool for Christ), and companion of Irenarch of Rostov
- John Kochurov, early 20th-century Orthodox missionary to the United States, later hieromartyr killed by Bolsheviks during the October Revolution
- John of Kronstadt, patron saint of St Petersburg, mystic and religious writer
- John of Moscow, fool for Christ and wonderworker of Moscow during the reign of Boris Godunov
- John of Novgorod, highly venerated 12th-century Archbishop of Novgorod
- John of Pskov, hermit living in Pskov at the turn of the 16th to 17th century
- John the Russian, one of the most renowned saints in the Greek Orthodox Church, 18th-century Russian prisoner of war in the Ottoman Empire, wonderworker respected even by Muslims
- John of Shanghai and San Francisco, wonderworker, archbishop, and best-known missionary of the Russian Orthodox Church Outside of Russia
- John of Tobolsk, founder of Chernigov Collegium, missionary in Siberia, and Metropolitan Bishop of Tobolsk
- Jonah of Manchuria, diocesan bishop of the Russian Orthodox Church Outside Russia, serving in Northern China in the years immediately following the Bolshevik Revolution
- Jonah of Moscow, first independent Metropolitan of Moscow and all Russia appointed without approval of the Patriarch of Constantinople
- Joseph Volotsky, prominent caesaropapist ideologist and founder of the Joseph-Volokolamsk Monastery
- Juliana of Lazarevo, 16th-century saint, famous for helping the poor and needy, and protagonist of a book written by her son
- Juvenaly of Alaska, Protomartyr of America, and member of the first group of Orthodox missionaries to Alaska killed by Yupik natives

=== K ===
- Kirill of Beloozero, founder of Kirillo-Belozersky Monastery
- Kuksha of the Kiev Caves, 12th-century monk and martyr from the Kiev Pechersk Lavra, killed while spreading Christianity among pagan Vyatichi
- Kuksha of Odessa, 20th-century saint in the Soviet Union

=== L ===
- Luke Wojno-Jasieniecki, Archbishop of Crimea; outstanding surgeon and founder of purulent surgery; and spiritual writer
- Luke Zhidiata, Archbishop of Novgorod, first Russian-born bishop of the Russian Orthodox Church (all previous bishops having been Greek)

=== M ===
- Macarius of Unzha, founder of several monasteries including the Makaryev Monastery
- Grand Duchess Maria Nikolaevna of Russia, third daughter of Tsar Nicholas II of Russia, murdered during the Russian Civil War with her entire family, all of whom were canonized as "new-martyrs"
- Maria Skobtsova, noblewoman, poet, nun, and member of the French Resistance during World War II (canonized by the Ecumenical Patriarchate)
- Mark of the Caves, famous cave-digger in the Kiev Pechersk Monastery
- Maxim Sandovich, protomartyr of the Lemko people, an ethnic group inhabiting the Lemko Region; an Orthodox priest executed by the Austro-Hungarian Empire as a russophile
- Maximus the Greek, 16th-century scholar, humanist and translator
- Michael of Chernigov, former Prince of Kiev, executed by Batu Khan in 1246 for refusing to ritually submit by walking between two fires and kowtow before an idol of Chingis Khan
- Michael of Kiev, first Metropolitan of Kiev after the Baptism of Rus by Vladimir the Great
- Michael of Klop, 15th-century fool for Christ and wonderworker
- Michael of Tver, Grand Prince of Vladimir, killed by Mongol-Tatars
- Mitrophan of Voronezh, first bishop of Voronezh
- Moses the Hungarian, 11th-century monk in the Kiev Cave Monastery, who spent seven years as a Polish prisoner after the 1018 Kiev Expedition
- Matrona of Anemnyasevo, 20th-century saint
- Matrona of Moscow, 20th-century saint who claimed that from early childhood she had gifts of prophecy, spiritual vision, and healing

=== N ===
- Nicetas of Novgorod, 11th-century monk from the Kiev Pechersk Lavra who became a wonderworker and bishop of Novgorod
- Nicetas Stylites, 12th-century hermit and healer after a dissolute youth who bound himself in chains and enclosed himself within a pillar, thus his title of "Stylites"; founder of the Monastery of St. Nicetas
- Nicholas Salos of Pskov, 16th-century fool for Christ who reprimanded Tsar Ivan the Terrible and saved the city of Pskov from his atrocities
- Nestor the Chronicler, to whom is traditionally attributed authorship of the Primary Chronicle and several hagiographies
- Tsar Nicholas II of Russia, last Russian emperor, murdered during the Russian Civil War with his enitre family, all of whom were canonized as "new-martyrs"
- Nicholas of Japan, Bishop of Japan and translator, who introduced the Eastern Orthodox Church to Japan
- Nikon the Dry, 11th-century monk from the Kiev Pechersk Lavra, captured and enslaved by nomads and released by miracle
- Nilus of Sora, founder of the 16th-century non-possessors movement

=== O ===
- Olga of Kiev, the first woman ruler of Kievan Rus' (regent), and first Christian princess of Kiev
- Grand Duchess Olga Nikolaevna of Russia, eldest daughter of Tsar Nicholas II of Russia, murdered during the Russian Civil War with her entire family, all of whom were canonized as "new-martyrs"
- Onisim of the Caves (Ukrainian: Онисим затвірник Печерський) (fl. 12th-13th century), a monk of the Kyiv Pechersk Lavra and buried at the Near Caves

=== P ===
- Paisius Velichkovsky, 18th-century monk and theologian who helped spread staretsdom or the concept of the spiritual elder to the Slavic world
- Paisius Yaroslavov, 15th-century monk, starets, and author of the Take of the Kamenny Monastery
- Paul of Taganrog, 19th-century pilgrim and wonderworker
- Peter the Aleut, 19th-century martyr in Russian America, allegedly a baptized native of the Kodiak Island (one of the Aleutian Islands), killed by Spanish Catholics (canonized by the Orthodox Church in America)
- Peter and Fevronia, 12th-century Prince and Princess consort of Murom, wonderworkers and an ideal of the family love and fidelity
- Peter Mogila, 17th-century Metropolitan of Kiev, theologian, educator, and printer
- Peter of Moscow, born c. 1260 in the Kingdom of Galicia–Volhynia, Metropolitan of Kiev and all Rus' 1308—1326; canonized in 1339
- Peter Polyansky, Metropolitan of Krutitsy, locum tenens of the Russian Orthodox Church
- Procopius of Ustyug, 13th-century fool for Christ and miracle worker

=== R ===
- Raphael of Brooklyn, bishop of the Russian Orthodox Church in America and founder of the main cathedral of the Antiochian Orthodox Christian Archdiocese of North America

=== S ===
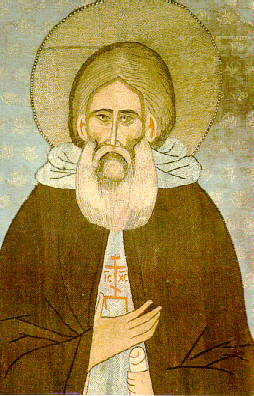
Sergius of Radonezh

- Sabbas of Storozhi, founder of the Savvino-Storozhevsky Monastery
- Sabbatius of Solovki, co-founder of the Solovetsky Monastery
- Seraphim of Sarov, mystic and patron saint of Russia, the greatest of the 19th-century startsy (plural of starets)
- Serapion of Novgorod, Archbishop of Novgorod in the 16th century, known for his conflict with Joseph Volotsky
- Sergius of Radonezh, spiritual and monastic reformer in the Principality of Moscow; founder of the Trinity Lavra of St. Sergius; blesser of Dmitry Donskoy for the Battle of Kulikovo; canonized in 1452
- Sergius of Valaam, credited with bringing Christianity to the Karelians and Finns, and co-founder of the Valaam Monastery
- Silouan the Athonite, Russian-born Atos monk, called "the most authentic monk of the twentieth century" by Thomas Merton
- Simon Shleyov hieromartyr, Bishop of Okhta, theologian, and the most notable apologist of edinoverie in the early 20th century
- Sophia of Suzdal, first wife of Prince of Moscow Vasily III
- Stephan of Perm, 14th-century missionary, credited with the conversion of the Komi Permyaks to Christianity and the invention of Old Permic script
- Sylvester of the River Obnora, 15th-century hermit who lived on the banks of the Obnora River

=== T ===
- Grand Duchess Tatiana Nikolaevna of Russia, second daughter of Tsar Nicholas II of Russia, murdered during the Russian Civil War with her entire family, all of whom were canonized as "new-martyrs"
- Theodore the Black, 13th-century Prince of Yaroslavl, Smolensk, and Mozhaysk, who ended his life as a monk and deeply repented his alliance with Mongol invaders
- Theodore the Varangian and his son John, first known martyrs in Kievan Rus'
- Theodosius of Kiev, co-founder of the Kiev Pechersk Lavra, the first monastery in Kievan Rus'
- Theophan the Recluse, major 19th-century theologian who played an important role in translating the Philokalia from Church Slavonic into Russian
- Therapont of White Lake, founder of the Ferapontov Monastery
- Tikhon of Kaluga, founder of the Dormition of the Mother of God Monastery in Kaluga
- Tikhon of Moscow, Patriarch of Moscow and all Russia, notable missionary, fighter against the so-called Living Church, first saint of the 20th century canonized by the Russian Orthodox Church
- Tikhon of Zadonsk, bishop and spiritual writer, and the most important 18th-century religious educator in Russia
- Tryphon of Pechenga, founder of the Pechenga Monastery on the Kola Peninsula

=== V ===
- Vladimir I of Kiev "the Great," Prince of Kiev who turned from pagan to saint and stimulated the Christianization of Kievan Rus'
- Vsevolod of Pskov, medieval prince and a patron saint of Pskov

=== X ===
- Xenia of Saint Petersburg, fool for Christ, patron saint of St Petersburg who gave all her possessions to the poor and wandered for 45 years around the streets
- Xenophon of Robeika, 13th-century monk, hermit, and hegumen of the Khutyn Monastery

=== Y ===
- Yegor Chekryakovsky, priest and starets, the spiritual heir of Saint Ambrose of Optina
- Yuri II of Vladimir, Grand Prince of Vladimir during the Mongol invasion of Kievan Rus' who died in the Battle of the Sit River

=== Z ===
- Zosima of Solovki, one of the founders of the Solovetsky Monastery

== See also ==
- Canonization in the Russian Orthodox Church – process
- List of Russian saints (until 15th century) – Metropolis of Kiev and all Rus'
- List of Eastern Orthodox saints
- List of American Eastern Orthodox saints
- List of saints of the Serbian Orthodox Church
- List of metropolitans and patriarchs of Moscow
- List of saints in the Ukrainian Orthodox Church of the Kyiv Patriarchate

== Bibliography ==
- Martin, Janet (2007). Medieval Russia: 980–1584. Second Edition. E-book. Cambridge: Cambridge University Press. ISBN 978-0-511-36800-4.
- Possevino, A. (2010). The Moscovia of Antonio Possevino, S.J.: Translated with a Critical Introduction and Notes by Hugh F. Graham. Russian and East European Studies. University of Pittsburgh Press. p. 212. ISBN 978-0-8229-7735-3.
