= Life of Symeon the Fool =

Hagiography text on Simeon the Holy Fool

The Life of Symeon the Fool is a hagiography text concerning Simeon the Holy Fool. It was written by Leontios of Neapolis in the middle of the seventh century AD at Limassol. It describes Symeon the monk pretending to be insane. The Life of Symeon the Fool is the first full-length text concerning the life of a holy fool.

== Narrative overview ==
Kees Waaijman subdivided the text into four sections, an introduction (19–24), Symeon's anchoritic life (24–56), Symeon's foolish life (56–93), and an epilogue (93–95). Symeon's life begins with him and an unknown John traveling together in a pilgrimage from Syria to Jerusalem. Through their travel, they become friends (24); And on their return, past Jericho, they see monasteries by the Jordan River. Both decide to enter the Gerasimos monastery led by Abba Nikos (25–37), but after staying for a few days, both leave to live an ascetic life as hermits for twenty-nine years until Symeon is motivated by the Holy Spirit to return to public life. Symeon urges John to leave also because living in the desert serves no purpose and suggests to John that they should help others receive salvation (45–52). John refuses but gives prayer and advice before Symeon departs (52–56). Symeon resided in Jerusalem for three more days then departed to Emesa to begin his "foolish life" (58–91). There he remained until his death. His body was covered with branches until it was discovered by two men. The men buried him in cemetery for strangers; His remains have never been found (91–93).

== Bibliography ==
- Krueger, Derek (2018). Symeon the Holy Fool: Leontius's Life and the Late Antique City. University of California Press, 2018. ISBN 9780520302112.
- Waaijman, Kees (2002). Spirituality: Forms, Foundations, Methods (Reprint ed.). Peeters Publishers. ISBN 9789042911833.
