= Hell icon =

Icons with hidden images of Devil

Hell icons (Russian: Адописная икона, adopisnaya ikona, lit. "Hell-written icon" or "Hell-painted icon") are alleged icons with images of the Devil hidden under the primer, the riza or the painted layer. Also, the image of saints could include horns hidden under the paint.

The term "Hell-written" first occurs in Prologue (Eastern Orthodox Synaxarium) regarding Sabellianist church banners. Full Church Slavonic dictionary gives the following commentary: "painted in hell". The term "Hell icons" is mostly used amongst Old Believers. The painting of hell icons, known as adopis or "hellography" (as opposed to iconography), was also a type of black magic in medieval Russia.

Hell icons were first mentioned in the Life of St. Basil (the 16th century): Basil threw a rock at the icon of Virgin Mary before the eyes of the astonished crowd of pilgrims. Then he allegedly showed that the image of the devil was hidden under the paint.

Messages about hell icons appeared in newspaper articles and the literature of the 19th century, but such articles reported only the later icons of "cheap and clumsily painting." Nikolai Leskov, who was interested in Christian iconography, included a reference to hell icons in his story The Sealed Angel (1872) and in short article "On hell icons" (Russian: Об адописных иконах), published in 1873.

In the 20th century Russian linguist Nikita Tolstoy doubted their existence. This point of view is shared by modern art critics due to lack of material evidence (all such icons, if ever existed, have been lost).
