= Sergei Kirillov =

Modern Russian artist

- Сергей Кириллов
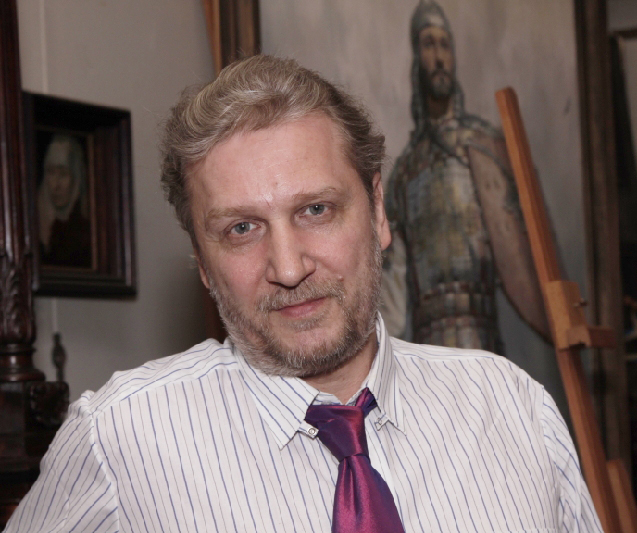
- Kirillov in 2011
- Born: 10 May 1960 (age 66); Moscow, Russian SFSR, Soviet Union
- Known for: Painting

Sergei Alekseevich Kirillov (Russian: Сергей Алексеевич Кириллов; born 1960) is a Russian artist, who focuses on historical paintings. His subjects have included Dmitry Mikhailovich Bobrok, Stepan Razin, Princess Olga, Ivan the Terrible, Saint Sergius of Radonezh, and Dmitry Donskoy.

== Education and work ==
In 1984, he graduated from the Surikov Art Institute in Moscow. His graduate work depicted Peter the Great. His paintings are now regularly published in history classroom books, monographs of the history of Russia, and historical belletristic literature. Since 1987, 24 exhibitions of his paintings have been held in Moscow and other cities in Russia.

== Holdings by museums ==
His works are in the State Tretyakov Gallery, and the art museums of Pereslavl, Bryansk, Alexandrov, and other towns in Russia.

Sergei Kirillov's paintings

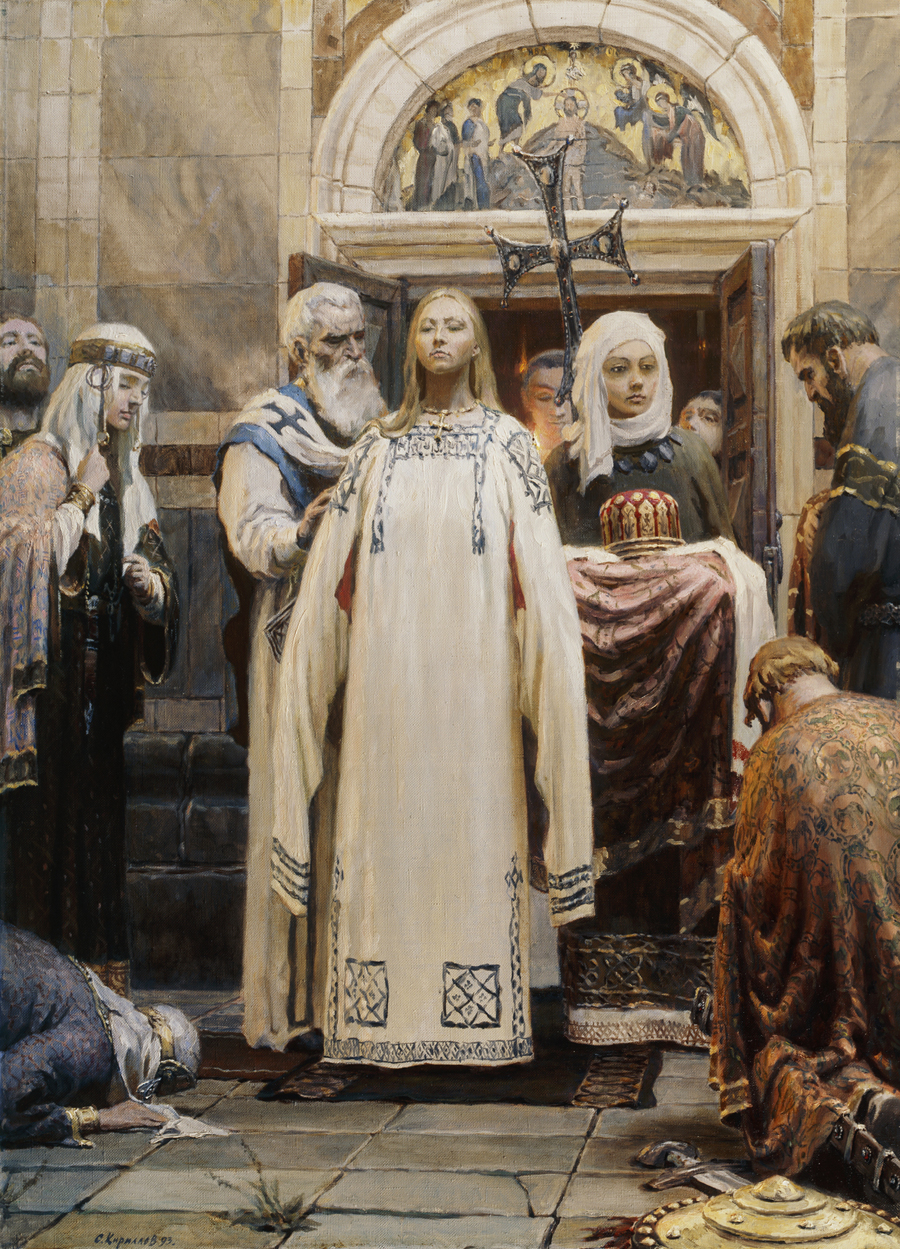
Baptism of Saint Princess Olga

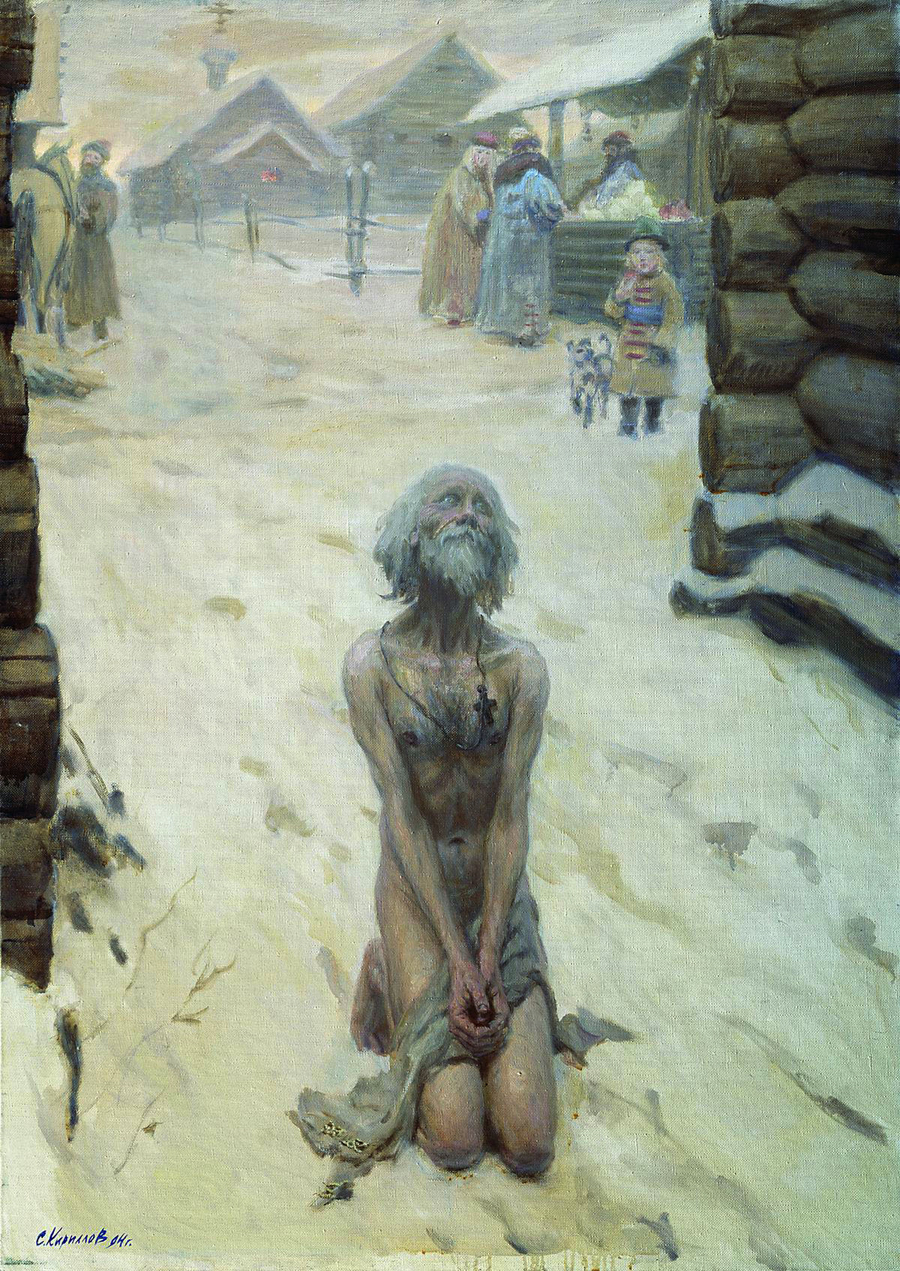
Basil Fool for Christ praying almost naked in the snow.

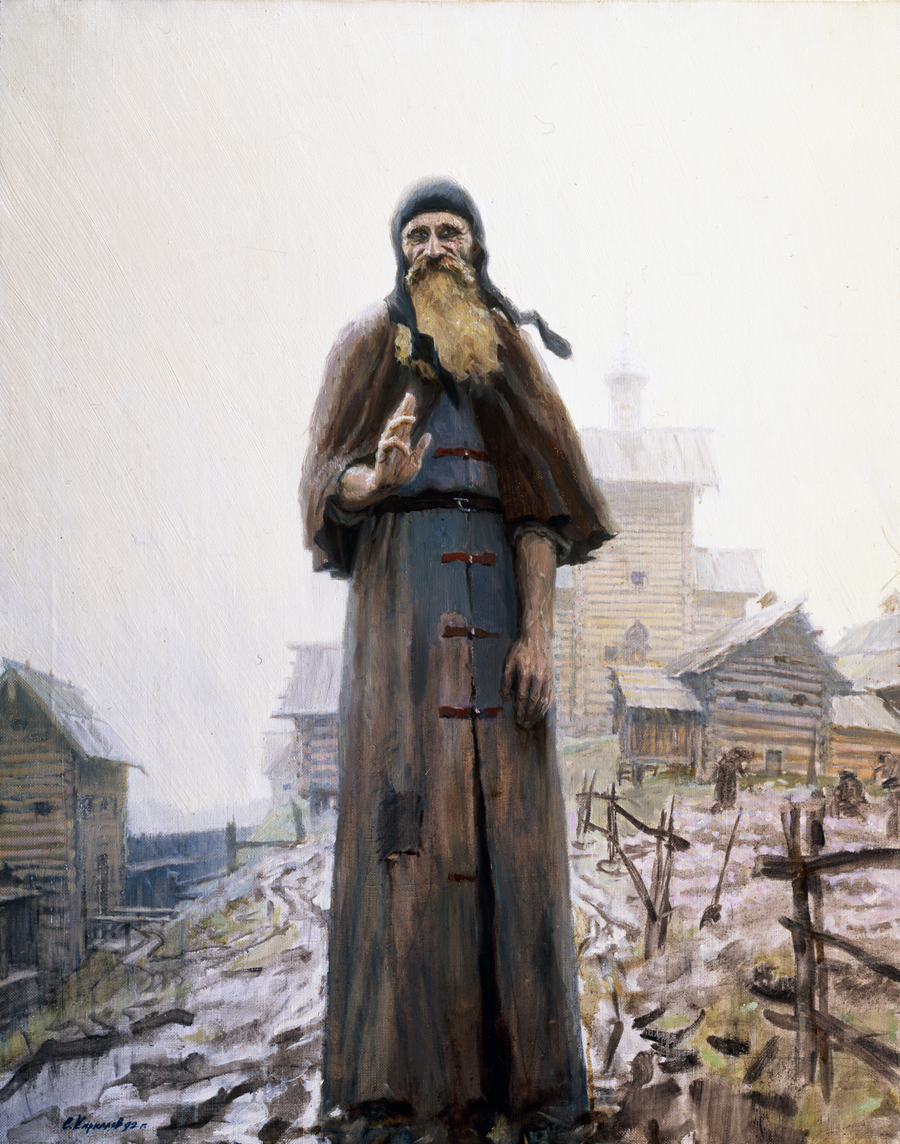
Sergius of Radonezh

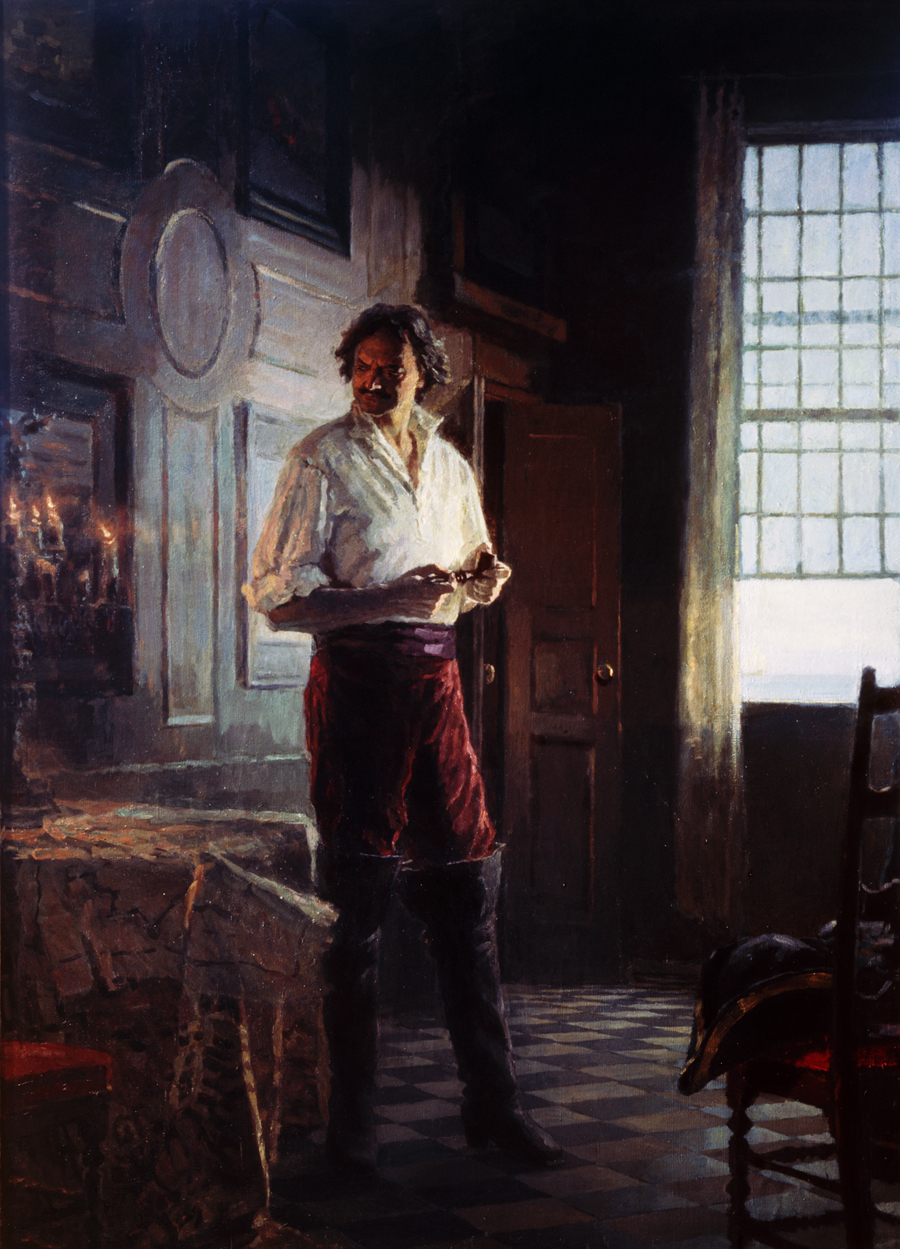
Peter the Great

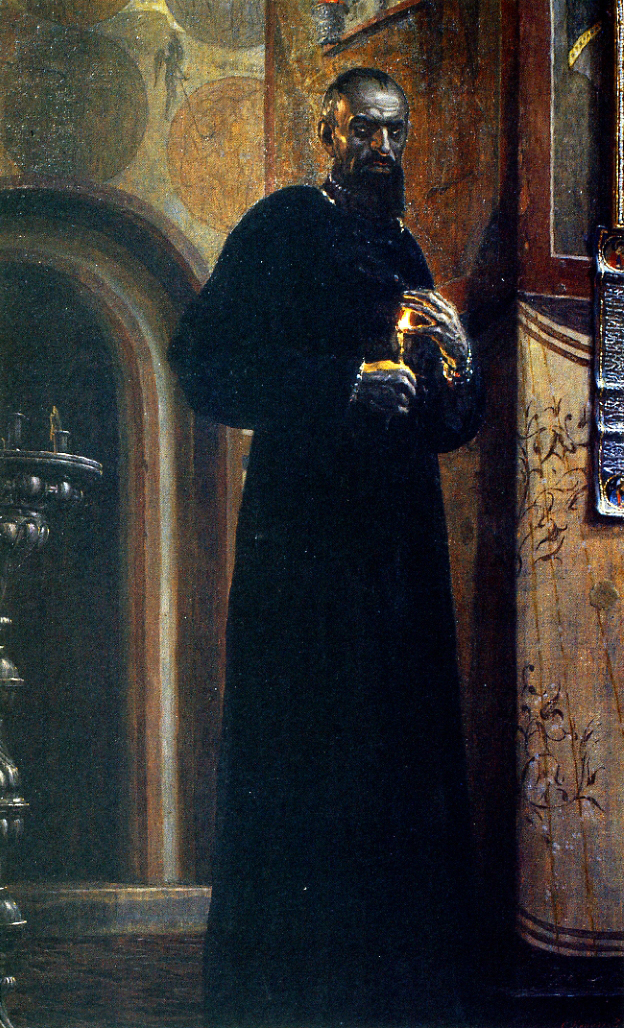
Ivan the Terrible, older

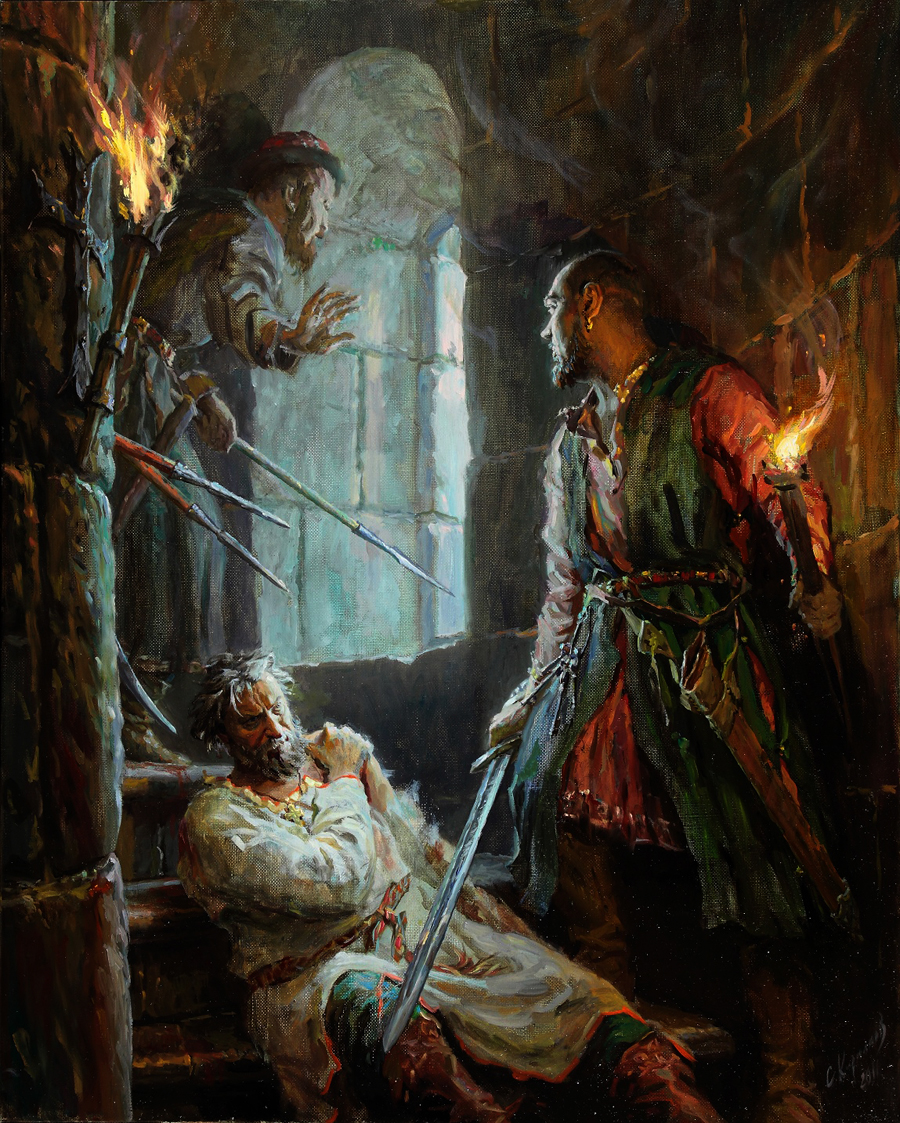
Andrey Bogolyubskiy
