= Canonization in the Russian Orthodox Church =

Process for confirming people as saints

Saints in the Russian Orthodox Church (and the preceding Metropolis of Kiev and all Rus' until 1448) are confirmed by canonization which lists the decedent into the Community of Saints. After canonization, the saint is usually listed in the Menologium. The saint is honoured by illustrating him on icons, mentioning him in kondaks or troparions, narrating his achievements in the Lives of Saints, confirming a celebration date in the Orthodox calendar and building churches and monasteries holding his name. The office of canonization is usually the last prayer to the departed (parastasa, pannychis, lity) and first prayer to the saint (all-night vigil, moleben, megalynarion).

== Categorisation and periodisation ==
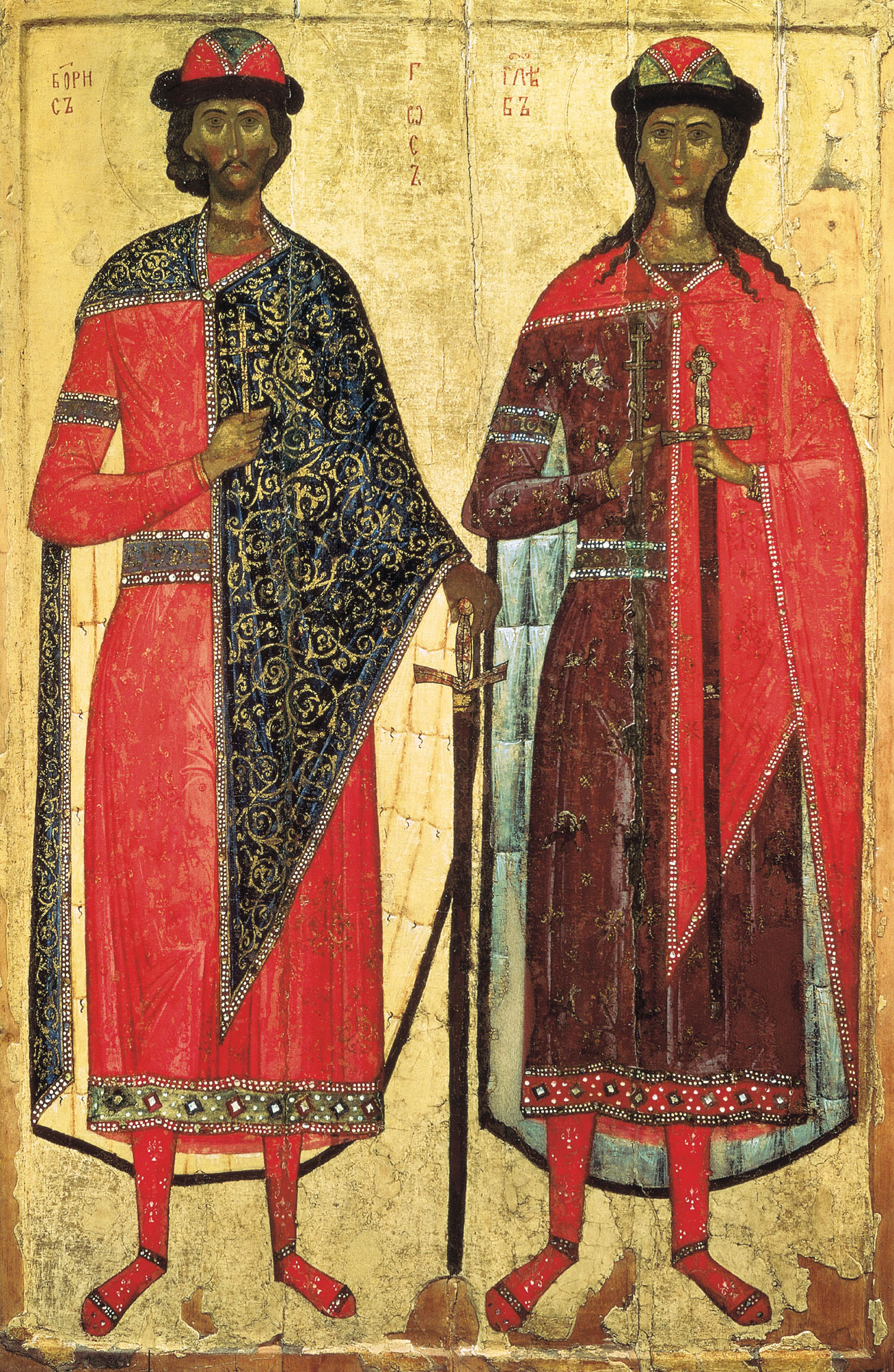
Boris and Gleb, first saints canonised in Kievan Rus'

Canonization is usually divided into two categories: local and church-wide. The church-wide canonization is always performed by the highest church organ, that is the Metropolitan or Patriarch above the Council of Eparchs, the chief member above the Most Holy Synod in the synodal period, or the Patriarch of Moscow and all of Russia above the Holy Synod of the Russian Orthodox Church in contemporary Russia. The local canonization is performed in either one church or monastery, or in one eparchy, by the local episcope with the approval of the Metropolitan or Patriarch and the highest church organ, to honour one person or people who are better known in a particular region. In cases when the local canonization was performed without the blessing of the highest church organ, the previous canonization process won't be annulled but will be performed again as it should be. Sometimes the Head of the Church himself or the metropolitanate accomplishes the local canonization. Both local and church-wide canonizations are honoured the same way; they should not be expressed as higher and lower canonizations. A saint can be both local and church-wide, and in very rare cases he or she can be de-canonized. Canonization takes place under different time and reason; for example in the same day when the translation of the relics is accompanied by a wonder, or only several centuries later.

Church historians name either five or seven periods of canonization in Russia; those who state there were five periods typically merge the Nicholas II-period with the Synodal-period and the post-revolutionary with the post-Soviet era. However, the seven period-system is used here for a better understanding of the Russian canonization history. Those are the following: 1) 9th century – 1547, 2) 1547 and 1549 (Macarius Councils), 3) 1550–1721 (pre-Petrine period), 4) 1721–1894 (Synodal-period), 5) 1894–1917 (Nicholas II-period), 6) 1917–1987 (post-revolutionary period), 7) from 1988 (post-Soviet period).

== Early history of Christianity in the Rus' lands ==
Christianity came to the Slavs already in the 1st century. According to early church historians, Apostle Andrew preached Christianity to Slavs and Scythians, in the area between Eastern Europe in the west, and Caucasus and at the Black Sea coast in the south and east, particularly in Scythia within the autocephalous Scythian eparchy. Other active eparchies included the Gothian, Sourozhian, Fullian and the Bosporian. In this period Christianity began to rise within this area. Christianity was spread in the 9th century by crucial happenings that are often characterized as baptisms; if excluding the first baptism of the Rus under Apostle Andrew, those are the preachings and enlightenings of Slavs by Cyril and Method, the baptism of and by Askold and Dir, the baptism of and by Olga and finally the actual baptism under Vladimir I in 988.

== Hagiology ==
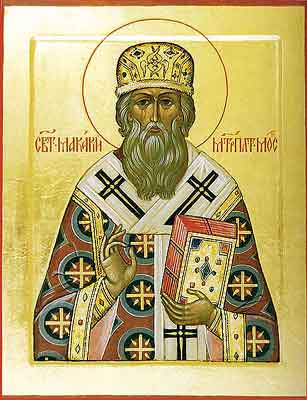
Macarius, Metropolitan of Moscow

The hagiology in the first period was particularly influenced by the Greek tradition. The Russian Church was one of several metropolitanates of the Constantinople Orthodox Church (i.e. the Greek Church), and almost all of the Metropolitans were of Greek origin (exceptions include Hilarion and Kliment). Following several Mongol-Tatar raids on Kiev in the mid-13th century, the cathedra was eventually moved to Vladimir in 1283 and to Moscow in 1325.

The Russian Church became less depended by the Constantinople Orthodox Church over the years. After the Fall of Constantinople in 1453 the wish for autonomity gradually increased. For example, under Jonah the Russian Church factually became autocephalous. The formation of the Russian Tsardom under Ivan IV in 1547 and Metropolitan Macarius' Menologion made way for two so-called Macarius Councils in 1547 and 1549. The first one began on 1 February 1547 and includes both local and church-wide canonizations. Information about the following 1549 Council is less detailed – it is basically based on two sources; a mention of it by Ivan IV on the Stoglavy Council and the list of canonized people from the Lives of Saints of Metropolitan Jonah. Whether those were local or church-wide canonizations is not exactly known. Altogether 39 saints were canonized on those Councils. They were ideal models for the upcoming canonizations, and had a positive influence on the church and civic society.

The majority of saints were canonized in the period between 1550 and 1721, including around 123 local and 23 church-wide saints. Some were included in Synaxes (собор), groupings of saints of a region, such as Synaxis of the Novgorod Saints or Synaxis of All Saints of Moscow. That period was marked by the happenings of the Schism of the Russian Church, caused by Patriarch Nikon's reforms, which resulted to de-canonizations (and later re-canonizations) of some saints, such as of Anna of Kashin and Maxim the Greek.

Following Peter I's western-influenced church reforms and centralization of the state in 1721 the Russian Church partially lost its independence from the state. The highest church organ was now the Most Holy Synod, a type of Council of Church Affairs, featuring non-clergical officials. In that period, from 1721 to 1894, the local canonization was completely removed as the tradition of honouring relics of local saints was seen as superstitious according to the Spiritual Regulation of 1721, and the church-wide canonizations greatly decreased. On the other hand, some of the most important saints were canonized in that period, such as the vast majority of Kiev Caves monks or Metropolitan Michael I.

A separate period within the Synodal period were the last years of the Russian Empire, ruled by Emperor Nicholas II (1894–1917). Nicholas II re-established the local canonization, and tried to recover the pre-Petrine format. For the first time since the last local canonization two centuries ago, the tradition has been reawaken in 1900, when 222 Orthodox believers led by St. Metrophanes were martyred during the anti-Christian Boxer Rebellion by the Yihetuan. A high point was the ceremonial canonization of Seraphim of Sarov, where the Emperor personally carried the coffin and thousands of people came to that celebration from all of over Russia. Another factor in the rapid growth of canonizations was the progressed hagiological and hagiographical researches between the 2nd half of the 19th century and the early 20th century in Russia. Furthermore, a future Council was expected to address questions regarding the gradual change to the traditional pre-Petrine system, but the date was always postponed until the revolutions. The church life flourished and reached records; for example, around 95,000 monks lived in Russia in 1914, while before that the number lied between 44,554 in 1894 and 25,207 in 1724.

The council from 1917 to 1918 also reviewed the practique of canonization, and can be viewed as a continuation of de-bureaucratization of the Synod. On the other side, the post-revolutionary years saw a radical secularization of the state. The new Soviet regime was even more hostile towards the Church and religion than the Russian Provisional Government. In the 1960s, when the Church strengthened inter-religious affairs, it canonized saints of other local churches, such as John the Russian and Herman of Alaska. Logically, the Russian Church overlept the myriad of martyrs died during severe Christian persecutions. Instead of local canonizations, the saints were often grouped into synaxes, to avoid conflicts with the atheist government. Between 1978 and 1979, the second and third volumes of the Reference Book of the Clergy allowed researching the pre-revolutionary hagiography.

A new era in church life started from 1988, during the Millennium of the Baptism of the Rus', when another Council was opened. In the following years canonizations that were previously unimaginable in the Communist regime were now performed, most notably of New Martyrs. Important canonizations include that of Dmitry Donskoy and Patriarch Tikhon.

== Saint titles ==
A traditionally practique in the Orthodox canonization is to add saint titles before the name of the saint. In the first Christian years, those were mainly martyrs. In the late 10th century, before the Great Schism, canonization of hierarchs became possible, which made way to new saint titles, such as Enlightener and Equal-to-apostles. In the course of the years more titles were added, sometimes special titles were created after influential events (e.g. New Martyr).

The following list of saints include the saint title in italics. Saint titles including Wondermaker and Holy Unmercenaries are commonly not included next to the name of the saint as such qualities are obvious for the most saints. The following titles are listed here:

- Blessed (блаженный) – one who aspires keep a righteous life
- Equal-to-apostle (равноапостольный) – one who acts like the Apostles
- Great Martyr/megalomartyr (великомученик) – one who died of a particularly violent martyrdom (none in this list)
- Hieromartyr (священномученик) – a member of the clergy who died for his faith
- Martyr (мученик) – one who died for his faith
- Righteous Martyr (преподобномученик) – a monk or nun who died for his or her faith
- New Martyr (новомученик) – one who died for his faith in post-revolutionary era (none in this list)
- Passion-bearer (страстотерпец) – one who died for fulfilling God's laws by malicious and wicked coreligionists
- Fool-for-Christ/yurodivy (юродивый) – a person who deliberately acts like a fool for Christ, hiding his piety and blessing those who denigrate him
- Confessor (исповедник) – one who was tortured, but did not die
- Enlightener (святитель) – an eparch or episcope who is righteous and venerable
- Hieroconfessor (священноисповедник) – a confessor who is also a clergyman
- Right-Believing (благоверный) – a monarch who did much for the church
- Righteous (праведный) – one who lives righteous within the secular world
- Unmercenary (бессребреник) – one who did not accept payment for good deeds
- Venerable (преподобный) – one who lives outside the secular world, such as hermits or monks

== Literature ==
- Golubinsky, Yevgeny Yevsigneyevich (1903). Исторiя канонизацiи святыхъ въ Русской церкви [History of the Canonization of Saints by the Russian Church] (in Russian). Императорское общество исторiи и древности Россiйскихъ при Московскомъ университетѣ (Imperial Community of Russian History and Ancientry of the Moscow University).
- Dmitry of Rostov (1684–1705). V. Osmak (ed.). Житiя святыхъ [Lives of Saints] (in Russian and Church Slavic).
- Kabludovsky, A.P. (1902). Очерки по исторіи древнерусской литературы житій святыхъ [Essays about the History of Old Russian Literature of Lives of Saints] (in Russian). Warsaw.
- Klyuchevsky, Vasily Osipovich (1871). Древнерусскiя житiя святыхъ какъ историческiй источникъ [The Old Russian Lives of Saints as an Historical Source] (in Russian). Moscow: K. Soldatenkova.
- Kovalevsky, I. (1902). Юродство о Христѣ и Христа ради юродивые Восточной и Русской Церкви: Ист. очеркъ и житія сихъ подвижниковъ благочестія [Folly for the Sake of Christ and Fools-for-Christ of the Eastern and Russian Churches] (in Russian). Moscow.
- Nikodim (Kononov) (1903). Къ вопросу о канонизаціи святыхъ въ Русской Церкви [On the Question of Canonization of Saints in the Russian Church] (in Russian). Moscow.
- Serebryansky, Nikolay Ilyich (1915). Древнерусскія княжескіе житія [Lives of Old Russian Monarchs] (in Russian). Moscow.
- Taisia (Kartsova) (2001). Русские святые [Russian Saints] (in Russian). Азбука-классика.
- Vasilyev, V.P. (1893). Очерки по исторіи канонизаціи русскихъ святыхъ [Essays about the History of the Canonization of Russian Saints] (in Russian). Moscow.
- Yakhontov, Ivan Andreyevich (1881). Жiтия св. сѣвернорусскiхъ подвижниковъ Поморскаго края, какъ историческiй источникъ [The Lives of Saints of Ascetics of the Pomorian Krai, as an Historical Source] (in Russian). Kazan.
