= Simeon the Holy Fool =

Christian monk in Syria

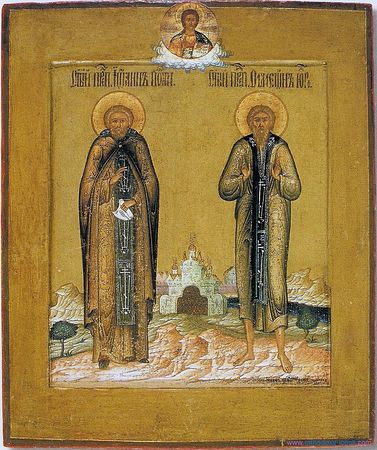
Simeon the Holy Fool and his friend Ioann, Eastern Orthodox icon

Simeon the Holy Fool (Abba Simeon, Saint Simeon Salos or Saint Simeon Salus, Greek: Συμεών (ὁ διὰ τὸν Χριστόν) Σαλός) was a Christian monk, hermit and saint of Byzantine-Syrian origin, who lived in the sixth century AD. He is venerated by the Eastern Orthodox Church and Roman Catholic Church as one of the first "fools for Christ". It is claimed that he simulated madness in order not to be venerated for his social deeds. He was seen dragging a dead dog around, throwing nuts at women, and generally acting like an imbecile.

== Biography ==
The dates of Simeon's life are not clear. Evagrius Scholasticus makes him a contemporary of the emperor Justinian I, while Leontios of Neapolis places his life in the reign of Maurice.

Reportedly born in Edessa, Simeon lived there, unmarried, with his old mother. At the age of 20 years Simeon took monastic vows in the monastery of Abba Gerasimus in Syria, along with his friend and fellow ascetic John from Edessa. After that Simeon and John spent about 29 years in the desert near the Dead Sea practicing asceticism and spiritual exercises. Later Simeon was urged by inspiration of God, as some sources say, to move to Emesa to perform social and charitable services. Reportedly the saint asked the Lord to permit him to serve people in such a way that they should not acknowledge him. At Emesa, through simulating madness and upsetting conventional rules, he was able to bring many citizens to repentance, save many souls from sin and convert them to Christianity.

Simeon entered the gate of Emesa (after spending many years in the desert) dragging a dead dog. Schoolchildren saw him and shouted (κράζειν) "Hey, a crazy abba...". The next day, a Sunday, he entered the church, extinguished the lights and threw nuts at women. On the way out of the church, Simeon overturned (έστρεψεν) the tables of the pastry chefs (πλακουντάριοι). Such playing the fool made him subject to insults, abuse and beatings, which Simeon endured with patience. In spite of his seemingly strange behaviour, Simeon the Holy Fool healed many possessed people by his prayer, fed the hungry, preached the Gospel, and helped needy citizens of the town. Many of Simeon's saintly deeds were done secretly.

His ministry also included trying to save a man whose eyes suffered from leucoma. Jesus had previously used saliva and clay to cure a man of blindness, and when the man with eye disease approached Simeon, he anointed the man's eyes with mustard, burning him and aggravating the condition to the extent that he reportedly went blind. Later the eyes were healed by the advice of Simeon, who used such way to explain the man's sins and bring him to correction.

Symeon played all sorts of roles foolish and indecent, but language is not sufficient to paint a picture of his doings. For sometimes he pretended to have a limp, sometimes he jumped around, sometimes he dragged himself along on his buttocks, sometimes he stuck out his foot for someone running and tripped him. Other times when there was a new moon, he looked at the sky and fell down and thrashed about.

The life of Simeon the Holy Fool was described by Leontios of Neapolis, who symbolically compared his life to that of Jesus, whom the saint tried to imitate in his own way. According to Leontios:

While the saint was there (in Emesa), he cried out against many because of the Holy Spirit and reproached thieves and fornicators. Some he faulted, crying that they had not taken communion often, and others he reproached for perjury, so that through his inventiveness he nearly put an end to sinning in the whole city.

The only person in Emesa with whom Simeon did not play a fool was deacon of the church in Emesa, his friend John. One time Simeon saved John from execution when he was falsely convicted. Shortly before his death Simeon, by the illustration of Leontios of Neapolis said to John:

I beg you, never disregard a single soul, especially when it happens to be a monk or a beggar. For Your Charity knows that His place is among the beggars, especially among the blind, people made as pure as the sun through their patience and distress. . . . [S]how love of your neighbor through almsgiving. For this virtue, above all, will help us on (the Day of Judgment).

The saint died about 570 AD and was buried by the city poor in a place where the homeless and strangers were buried. While the body of Saint Simeon was carried, several people heard a wondrous church choir. Only after his death did the secret of his imitative foolishness come to light. Some inhabitants remembered his acts of kindness and reportedly strange and powerful miracles.

Leontius's biography of Simeon is an important source for the study of urban life in late antiquity. His work also exists in medieval Syriac, Arabic, Georgian, and Slavonic translations.

== Feast day ==
In the Western Church, Saint Simeon's feast day is celebrated on July 1. Orthodox Christians commemorate him on July 21.

== See also ==
- Xenia of Saint Petersburg
- Benedict Joseph Labre
