= Christopher Edwards (author) =

American author (born 1954)

- Born: 1954 (age 71–72)
- Education: Yale University
- Occupation: Author

Christopher Edwards (born 1954) is an American author. He wrote Crazy for God: The Nightmare of Cult Life, a memoir of his seven-month experience as a member of the Unification Church of the United States, in 1976. In an interview while promoting his book, he said he travelled with a bodyguard and was afraid for his life. Edwards graduated from Yale University with majors in psychology and philosophy.

== See also ==
- Crazy for God
