= Foolishness for Christ =

Flouting social norms for religious purposes

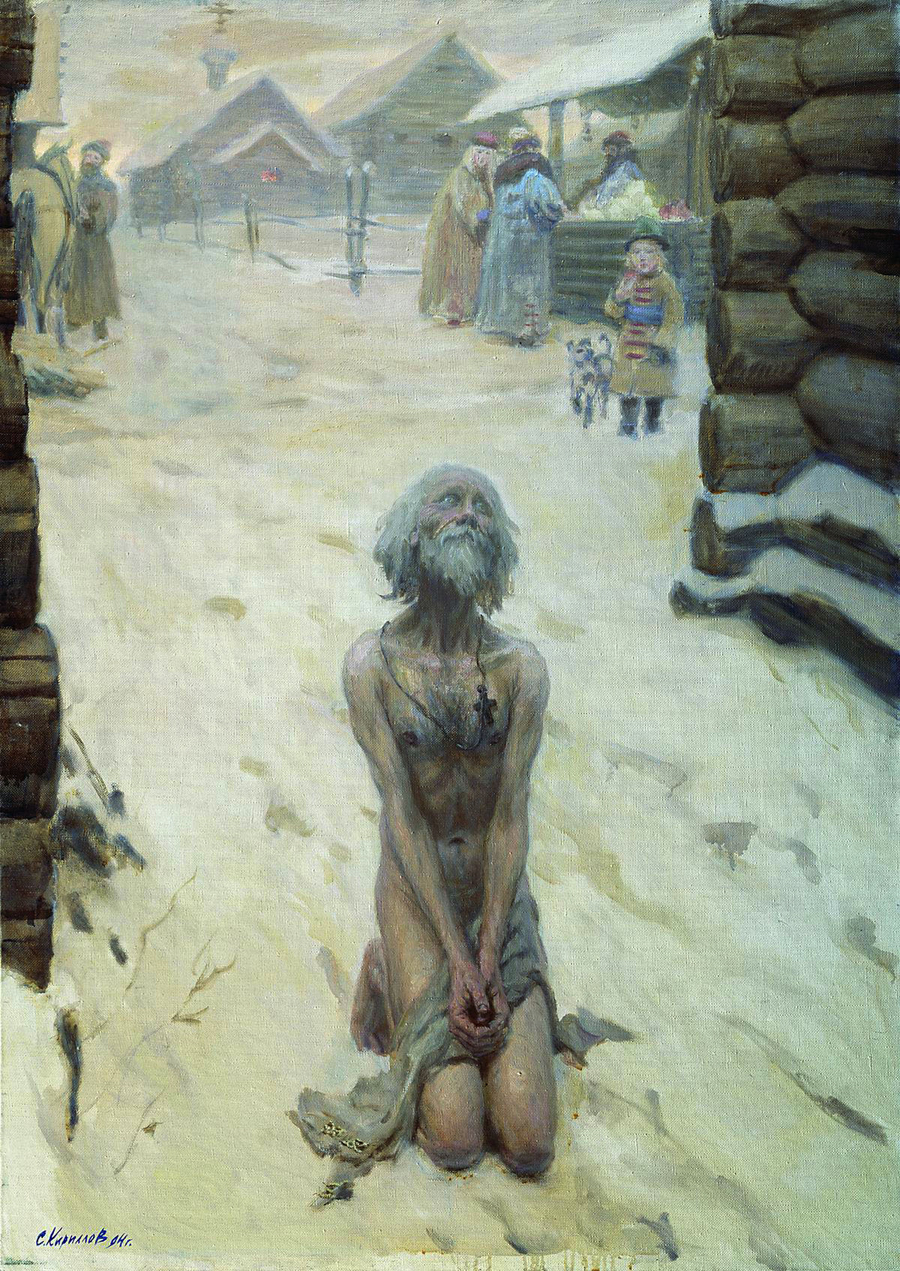
Basil Fool for Christ praying. He did not wear clothing either in summer or winter. Fools for Christ often challenge accepted norms to serve a religious purpose. Painting by Sergei Kirillov, 1994.

Foolishness for Christ (Greek: διά Χριστόν σαλότητα; Church Slavonic: оуродъ, юродъ) refers to behavior such as giving up all one's worldly possessions upon joining an ascetic order or religious life, or deliberately flouting society's conventions to serve a Christian purpose. Such individuals have historically been known as both "holy fools" and "blessed fools". The term "fool" connotes what is perceived as feeblemindedness, and "blessed" or "holy" refers to innocence in the eyes of God.

The term fools for Christ derives from the writings of Paul the Apostle. Desert Fathers and other saints acted the part of Holy Fools, as have the yurodivy (or iurodstvo) of Eastern Orthodox asceticism. Fools for Christ often employ shocking and unconventional behavior to challenge accepted norms, deliver prophecies, or to mask their piety.

== Old Testament ==
Certain prophets of the Old Testament who exhibited signs of strange behaviour are considered by some scholars to be predecessors of "Fools for Christ". The prophet Isaiah walked naked and barefoot for about three years, predicting a forthcoming captivity in Egypt (Isaiah 20:2, 3); the prophet Ezekiel lay before a stone, which symbolized beleaguered Jerusalem, and though God instructed him to eat bread baked on human waste, ultimately he asked to use cow dung instead (Ezekiel 4:9–15); Hosea married a harlot to symbolize the infidelity of Israel before God (Hosea 3).

In the opinion of certain scholars, these prophets were not considered fools by their contemporaries, because they sought to gain people's attention in order to awaken their repentance.

== New Testament ==
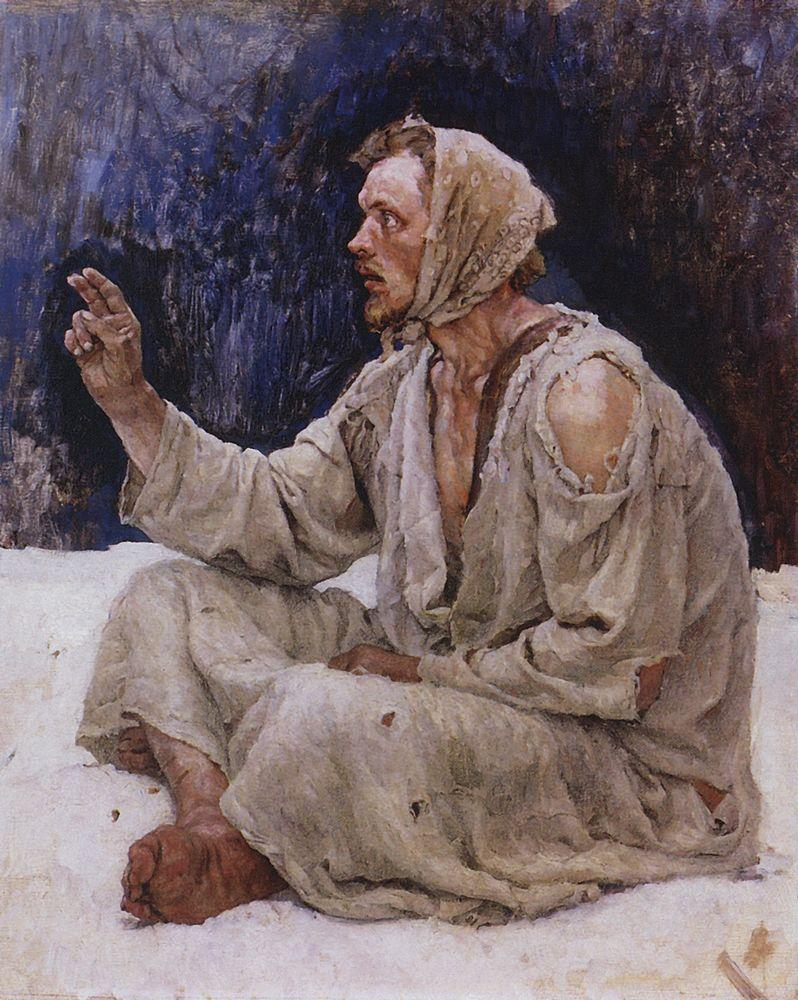
A God's Fool Sitting on the Snow, by Vasily Surikov, 1885

According to Christian ideas, "foolishness" included consistent rejection of worldly cares and imitating Christ, who endured mockery and humiliation from the crowd. The spiritual meaning of "foolishness" from the early ages of Christianity was closely related to that of rejection of common social rules of hypocrisy, brutality, and the worldly quest for power and gain.

By the words of Anthony the Great: "Here comes the time, when people will behave like madmen, and if they see anybody who does not behave like that, they will rebel against him and say: 'You are mad',—because he is not like them."

=== Paul the Apostle ===
Part of the Biblical basis for it can be seen in the words of the Apostle Paul in 1 Corinthians 4:10, which famously says:

"We are fools for Christ's sake, but ye are wise in Christ; we are weak, but ye are strong; ye are honourable, but we are despised." (KJV).

And also:

"For the wisdom of this world is foolishness in God's sight. As it is written: 'He catches the wise in their craftiness.'" (1 Corinthians 3:19)

"For the message of the cross is foolishness to those who are perishing, but to us who are being saved it is the power of God." (1 Corinthians 1:18)

"For since in the wisdom of God the world through its wisdom did not know him, God was pleased through the foolishness of what was preached to save those who believe." (1 Corinthians 1:21)

== Western Christianity ==
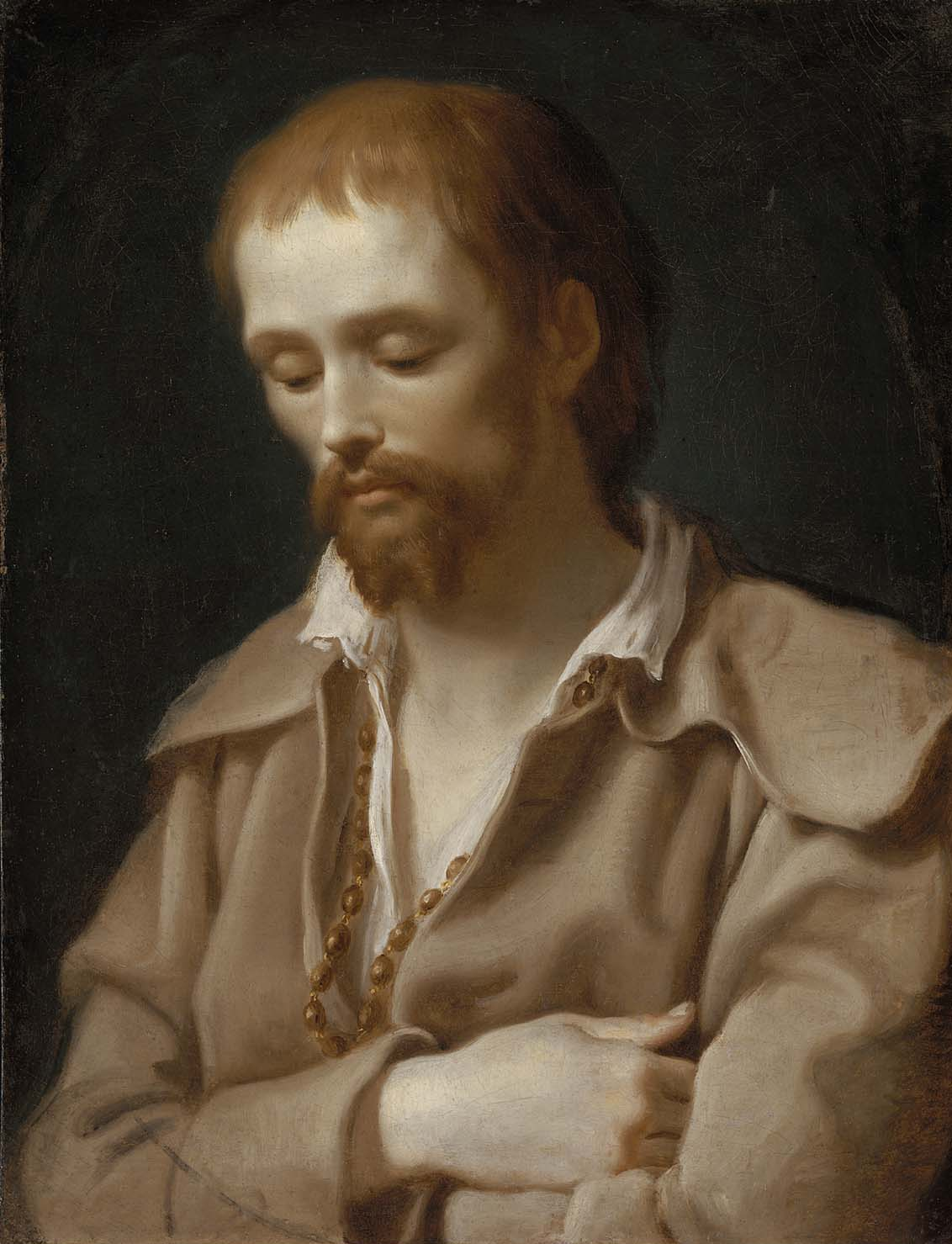
Benedict Joseph Labre

In Western Christianity there have been several saints who lived lives that were rather eccentric and seemingly foolish. Among the earliest of them was St. Nicholas of Trani, a young homeless man who died in 1094 AD. He apparently never stopped repeating the phrase 'Kyrie Eleison' and behaved foolishly. Similarly Blessed Peter of Foligno lived in voluntary poverty and was deemed crazy.

Other notable lay men who led saintly albeit eccentric lifestyles were Blessed Peter of Trevi, Teobaldo Roggeri, Benedict Joseph Labre, St. Salaun of Brittany, Ludovico Morbioli and Casimiro Barello among others. The key characteristics of foolishness for Christ in Western Christianity are sleeping rough (outdoors) and homelessness, a minimalistic lifestyle with very few if any possessions and a strict dedication to prayer and self-renunciation.

Some ascetics are known as mendicants and are organised into mendicant orders. The most famous example in the Western church is Francis of Assisi, whose order was known for following the teachings of Christ and walking in his footsteps. Thus, upon joining the order, Franciscans gave away all possessions and focused on preaching in the streets to the common man.

Servant of God, Brother Juniper, an early follower of the Franciscan order, was known for taking the doctrine of the Franciscans to the extreme. Whenever anyone asked for any of his possessions, he freely gave them away, including his clothes. He once even cut off the bells from his altar-cloth and gave them to a poor woman. His fellow Franciscans had to watch him closely, and strictly forbade him from giving away his clothes. While such behaviors were embarrassing to his brothers, he was also recognized as a pure example of the Franciscan order and thus esteemed.

"The Little Flowers of Saint Francis of Assisi", which documents the oral traditions of the Franciscans, told several stories of "Brother Juniper". The most famous of these is the story of how Brother Juniper, when he heard a sick brother request a pig's foot as a meal, took a kitchen knife and ran into the forest, where he saw a herd of swine feeding. There, he quickly cut the foot off one of the swine and carried it back to the brother, leaving the swine to die. This angered the herdsman, who complained to Saint Francis. Saint Francis confronted Brother Juniper, who joyfully exclaimed, "It is true, sweet father, that I did cut off the swine's foot. I will tell thee the reason. I went out of charity to visit the brother who is sick." Brother Juniper likewise explained to the angry herdsman who, seeing the "charity, simplicity, and humility" (Hudleston, 1953) in Brother Juniper's heart, forgave him and delivered the rest of the pig to the brothers.

== Eastern Christianity ==
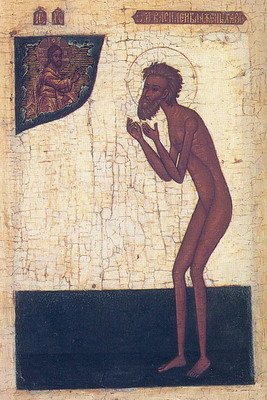
Basil Fool for Christ (1468–1552), a holy fool to whom Saint Basil's Cathedral in Moscow is dedicated

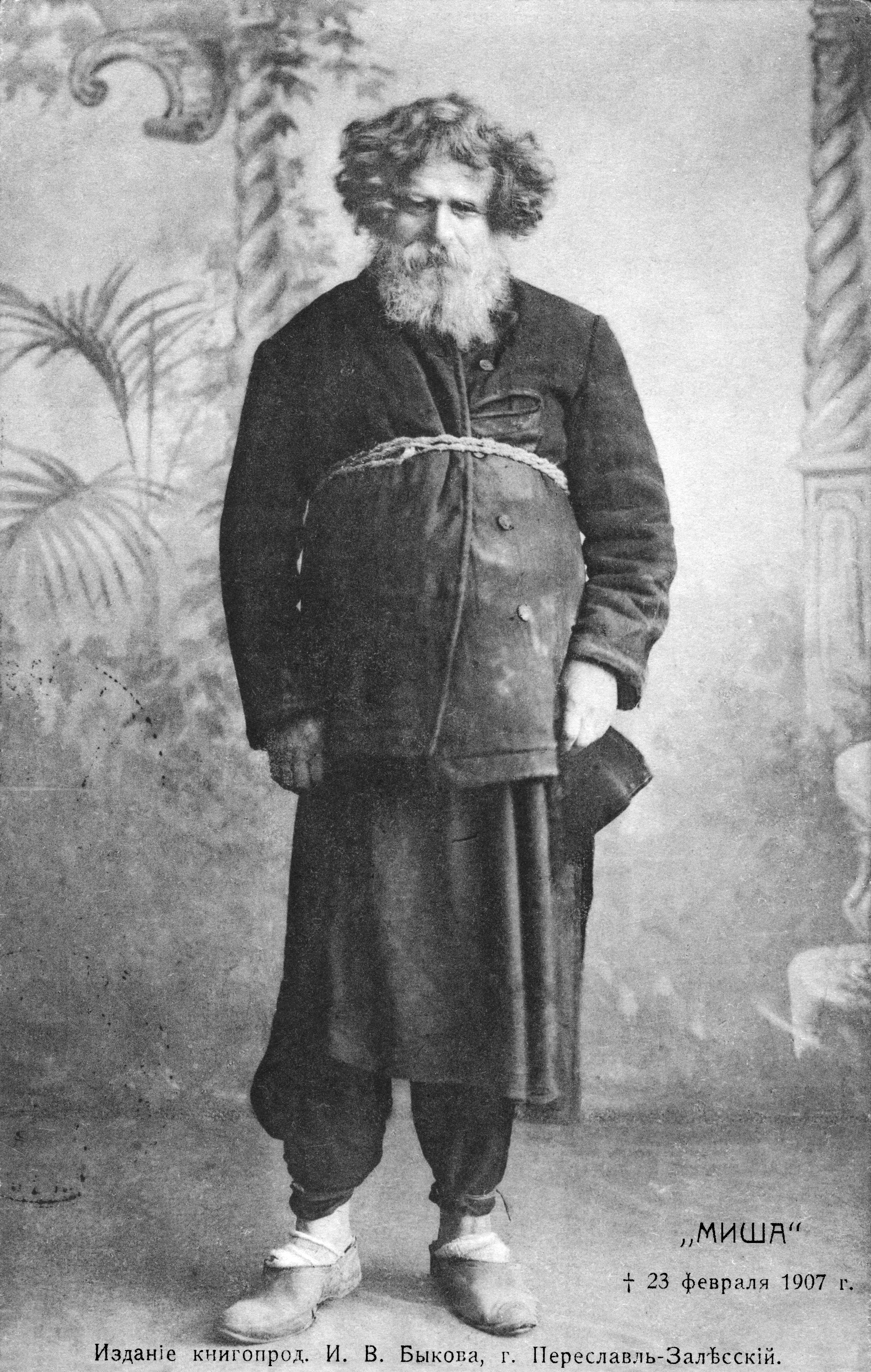
Misha Samuil (1848–1907), a holy fool from Pereslavl

The Holy Fool or yuródivyy (юродивый) is the Russian version of foolishness for Christ, a peculiar form of Eastern Orthodox asceticism. The yurodivy is a Holy Fool, one who acts intentionally foolish in the eyes of men. The term implies behaviour "which is caused neither by mistake nor by feeble-mindedness, but is deliberate, irritating, even provocative."

In his book Holy Fools in Byzantium and Beyond, Ivanov described "holy fool" as a term for a person who "feigns insanity, pretends to be foolish, or who provokes shock or outrage by his deliberate unruliness." He explained that such conduct qualifies as holy foolery only if the audience believes that the individual is sane, moral, and pious. The Eastern Orthodox Church holds that holy fools voluntarily take up the guise of insanity in order to conceal their perfection from the world, and thus avoid praise.

Some characteristics that were commonly seen in holy fools were going around half-naked, being homeless, speaking in riddles, being believed to be clairvoyant and a prophet, and occasionally being disruptive and challenging to the point of seeming immoral (though always to make a point).

Ivanov argued that, unlike in the past, modern yurodivy are generally aware that they look pathetic in others’ eyes. They strive to preempt this contempt through exaggerated self-humiliation, and following such displays they let it be known both that their behaviors were staged and that their purpose was to disguise their superiority over their audience.

Fools for Christ are often given the title of Blessed (блаженный), which does not necessarily mean that the individual is less than a saint, but rather points to the blessings from God that they are believed to have acquired.

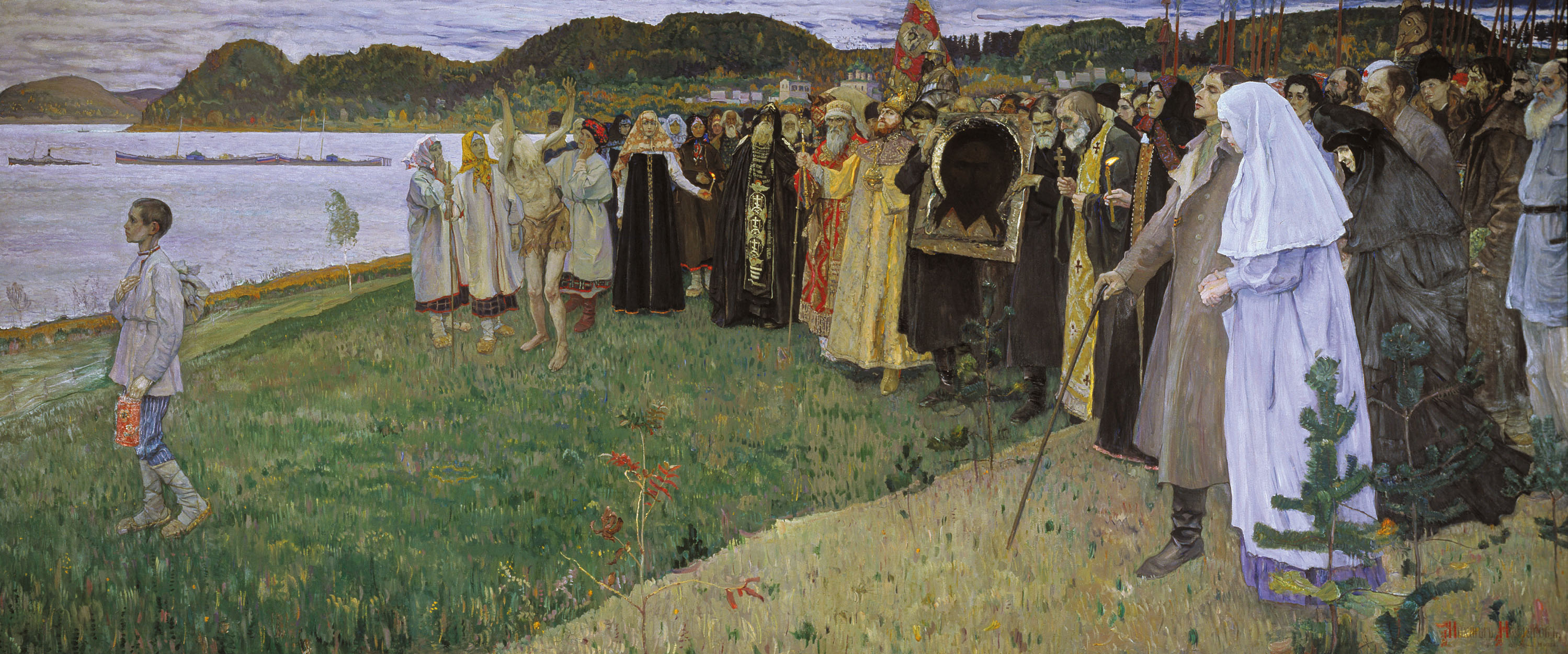
The Soul of the People. Notice the old man in the background, with his arms stretched to heaven, painting by Mikhail Nesterov

The Eastern Orthodox Church records Isidora Barankis of Egypt (d. 369) among the first Holy Fools. However, the term was not popularized until the coming of Symeon of Emesa, who is considered to be a patron saint of holy fools. In Greek, the term for Holy Fool is salos.

The practice was recognised in the hagiography of fifth-century Byzantium, and it was extensively adopted in Muscovite Russia, probably in the 14th century. The madness of the Holy Fool was ambiguous, and could be real or simulated. They were believed to have been divinely inspired, and were therefore able to say truths which others could not, normally in the form of indirect allusions or parables. They had a particular status in regard to the Tsars, as a figure not subject to earthly control or judgement.

The first reported fool-for-Christ in Russia was St. Procopius (Prokopiy), who came from the lands of the Holy Roman Empire to Novgorod, then moved to Ustyug, pretending to be a fool and leading an ascetic way of life (slept naked on church-porches, prayed throughout the whole night, received food only from poor people). He was abused and beaten, but finally won respect and became venerated after his death.

The Russian Orthodox Church numbers 36 yurodivye among its saints, starting from Procopius of Ustyug, and most prominently Basil Fool for Christ, who gives his name to Saint Basil's Cathedral in Moscow. One of the best-known modern examples in the Russian Church is perhaps St Xenia of Saint Petersburg.

== Common phrases or epithets ==
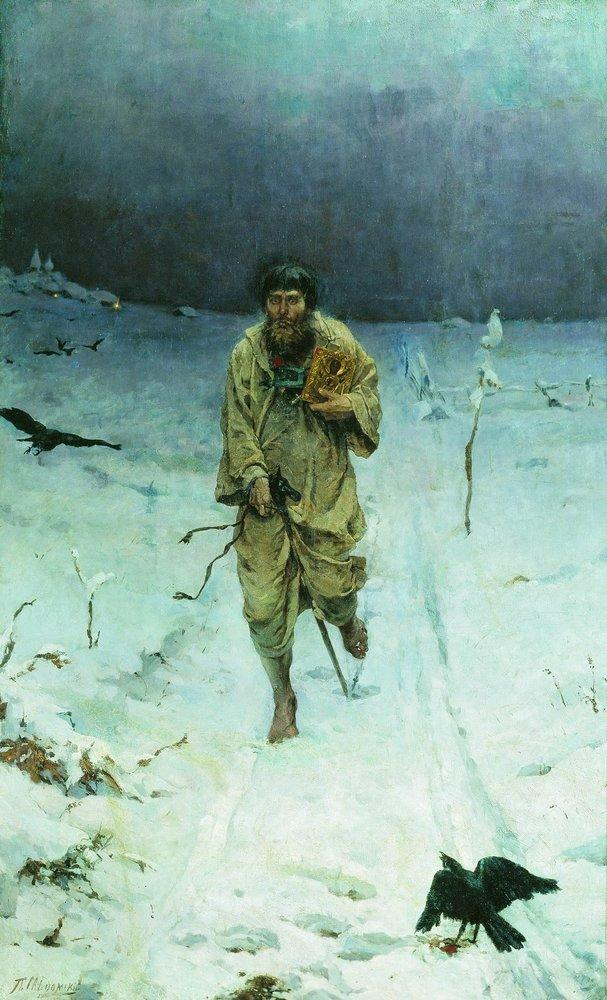
A God's Fool, by Pavel Svedomsky

=== Crazy for God ===
"Crazy for God" is an expression sometimes used in the United States and other English-speaking countries to convey a similar idea to "Foolishness for Christ." It has been especially connected to the Unification Church of the United States. In The Way of God's Will, a collection of sayings popular among church members, Unification Church founder Sun Myung Moon is quoted as saying: "We leaders should leave the tradition that we have become crazy for God."

In 1979 Unification Church critic Christopher Edwards titled a memoir about his experiences in the six months he spent as a church member: Crazy for God: The nightmare of cult life.

In 2007, author Frank Schaeffer titled his autobiography Crazy for God: How I Grew Up as One of the Elect, Helped Found the Religious Right, and Lived to Take All (or Almost All) of It Back. It tells of his upbringing as the son of a well-known evangelical minister and his later conversion to the Greek Orthodox Church.

In the same year Stephen Prothero, author and chairman of Boston University's Department of Religion, wrote in the Harvard Divinity Bulletin: "I am crazy for people who are crazy for God: people nearly as inscrutable to me as divinity, who leave wives and children to become forest-dwelling monks in Thailand, who wander naked across the belly of India in search of self-realization, who speak in tongues and take up serpents in Appalachia because the Bible says they can."

== Modern theology ==
One of the more recent works in theology is Fools for Christ by Jaroslav Pelikan. Through six essays dealing with various "fools," Pelikan explores the motif of fool-for-Christ in relationship to the problem of understanding the numinous:

The Holy is too great and too terrible when encountered directly for men of normal sanity to be able to contemplate it comfortably. Only those who cannot care for the consequences run the risk of the direct confrontation of the Holy.

== The yurodivy in art and literature ==
There are a number of references to the yurodivy holy fools in 19th century Russian literature. The holy fool Nikolka is a character in Pushkin's play Boris Godunov and Mussorgsky's opera based on the play. In Pushkin's narrative poem The Bronze Horseman, the character of Evgenii is based in the tradition of the holy fools in his confrontation with the animated statue of Peter the Great.

The yurodivy appears several times in the novels of Dostoevsky. The Idiot explores the ramifications of placing a holy fool (the compassionate and insightful epileptic Prince Myshkin) in a secular world dominated by vanity and desire. According to Joseph Frank "though the gentlemanly and well-educated prince bears no external resemblance to these eccentric figures, he does possess their traditional gift of spiritual insight, which operates instinctively, below any level of conscious awareness or doctrinal commitment." In Demons, the madwoman Marya Lebyadkina displays many of the attributes of the holy fool, as do the characters of Sofya Marmeladova and Lizaveta in Crime and Punishment.

Another fool-for-Christ is Grisha in Tolstoy's Childhood. Boyhood. Youth. Callis and Dewey described Grisha as follows:

He was an awesome figure: emaciated, barefoot and in rags, with eyes that "looked right through you" and long, shaggy hair. He always wore chains around his neck ... Neighborhood children would sometimes run after him, laughing and calling out his name. Older persons, as a rule, viewed Grisha with respect and a little fear, especially when he suffered one of his periodic seizures and began to shout and rant. At such times adult bystanders would crowd around and listen, for they believed that the Holy Spirit was working through him.

Grisha's abnormal social conduct, seizures, and rants were common behaviors amongst holy fools. The esteem expressed by adults was also common. In his autobiography, Tolstoy expressed such esteem in reaction to overhearing Grisha praying:

“Oh Great Christian Grisha! Your faith was so strong that you felt the nearness of God; your love was so great that words flowed of their own will from your lips, and you did not verify them by reason. And what high praise you gave to the majesty of God, when, not finding any words, you prostrated yourself on the ground.”

A further example is Kasyan in the ninth sketch from Turgenev's Sketches from a Hunter's Album. The protagonist's coachman describes him as "one of those holy men," who lives by himself in the forest. Kasyan strictly differentiates between eating bread ("God's gift to man") and "tame creatures" on the one hand, and birds "of the free air" and creatures "of the forest and of the field" on the other, regarding the latter category as sinful.

== Notable people described as fools for Christ ==
- Andrew the Fool
- Basil Fool for Christ
- Benedict Joseph Labre
- David the Dendrite
- Francis of Assisi
- Saint Isidora
- John of Moscow
- John the Hairy
- Simeon the Holy Fool
- Justo Gallego Martínez
- Nicholas the Pilgrim
- Nicholas Salos of Pskov
- Procopius of Ustyug
- Saint Gabriel of Georgia
- Xenia of Saint Petersburg

== See also ==
- Divine madness
- Hyperreligiosity
- Jerusalem syndrome
- Mast (Meher Baba)
- Psychology of religion
- Religion and schizophrenia
- Religious delusion
