= Irenarch of Rostov =

Russian Orthodox saint

Irenarchus of Rostov
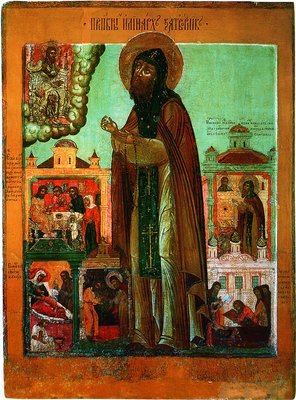

The recluse of Rostov, Hermit of Rostov
- Born: Elias; Kondakovo, Rostov district, Russia
- Venerated in: Russian Orthodox Church
- Feast: 13 January (Eastern Orthodox Church)
- Attributes: Monk's habit, bare feet (sometimes)
- Tradition or genre: Eastern Orthodox monasticism

Irenarch or Irenarchus the recluse of Rostov is honoured in the Russian Orthodox Church.

Irenarchus, Hermit of Rostov, was born into a peasant family in the village of Kondakovo in the Rostov district of Russia. In Baptism he received the name Elias. In his thirtieth year, he was tonsured a monk at the Rostov St.s Boris and Gleb Monastery. There he began fervently to labor at monastic tasks, he attended church services, and by night he prayed and slept on the ground. Once, taking pity on a vagrant who did not have shoes, St Irenarchus gave him his own boots, and from that time he began to go barefoot through the snow.

He moved to another monastery in Rostov (Saint Lazarus) and lived in a solitary cell for three years before going back to Sts Boris and Gleb; he then shackled himself in chains for 25 years while working there.

Irenarchus was a mystic and visionary. After his death many physical, psychological, and spiritual healings were attributed to the touching of his relics. He is commemorated 13 January in the Eastern Orthodox Church.

Irenarchus was a companion of John the Hairy.
