= John the Hairy =

Holy person in the Russian Orthodox Church

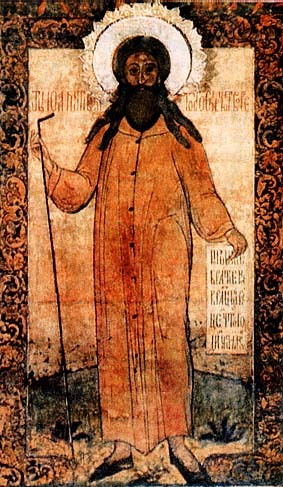
John the Merciful of Rostov

John the Hairy (Russian: Иоанн Власатый, also known as John the Merciful of Rostov) was a holy fool (yurodivy) of the Russian Orthodox Church in the second half of the 16th century. He endured a great many trials in his lifetime. "He did not have a permanent shelter, and at times took his rest at the house of his spiritual Father, a priest at the church of the All-Holy, or with one of the aged widows."

According to Orthodox Church in America sources, Blessed John,

Living in humility, patience and unceasing prayer... spiritually nourished many people, among them St Irenarchus, Hermit of Rostov (January 13). After a long life of pursuing asceticism, he died on September 3, 1580, and was buried, according to his final wishes, beside the church of Saint Blaise beyond the altar.

He had "hair upon his head abundantly," therefore he was called "Hairy." The title "Merciful" was given to Blessed John because of the many healings that occurred at his grave, and also in connection with the memory of the holy Patriarch John the Merciful (November 12), whose name he shared.

John the Hairy is commemorated on September 3 in the Eastern Orthodox Church.

The relics of the saint are in Rostov in the church in honor of Theotokos of Tolga, next to sanctuary are psalms and cupressus the cross belonging to the saint.

== See also ==
- Eastern Catholicism
- Basil Fool for Christ
- Xenia of Saint Petersburg
- Blessed John of Moscow the Fool-For-Christ

== Sources ==
- Vakhrina, V. I.; Romanova, A. A. (2010). Православная энциклопедия — Т. XXIII: Иннокентий — Иоанн Влах. Православная энциклопедия. pp. 333–340. ISBN 978-5-89572-042-4.
