= Nicholas Salos of Pskov =

Saint Nicholas Salos of Pskov
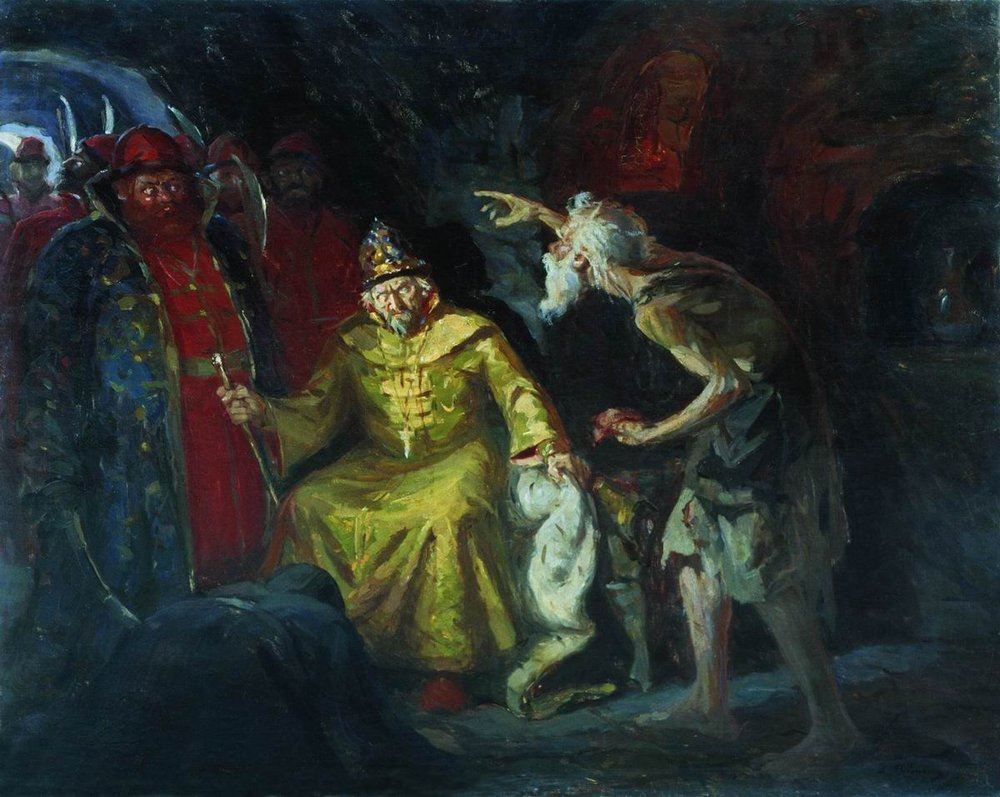
- Nicholas Salos confronting Ivan the Terrible

Fool-for-Christ
- Born: XVI century
- Died: 28 February 1576
- Venerated in: Eastern Orthodox Church
- Feast: 28 February

Nicholas Salos of Pskov (Russian: Николай Салос) (died 28 February 1576) was a Russian fool for Christ (yurodivy).

During his lifetime, the residents of Pskov called him Mikula the Fool, and even called him Saint Mikula.

In February 1570, after a devastating campaign against Novgorod Tsar Ivan the Terrible decided to attack Pskov, suspecting the inhabitants of treason. During the siege, Nicholas confronted the tsar, rebuking him for his cruelty. His fearless admonition reportedly caused Ivan IV to halt the executions and eventually retreat his forces to Alexandrov, sparing the city from massacre.

Nicholas died on February 28, 1576 and was buried at Holy Trinity Cathedral in Pskov; his relics are venerated there.

He is regarded as a saint in the Eastern Orthodox Church. His feast day is 28 February.
