= Athanasius Sakharov =

Russian Orthodox saint and hymnographer

(Athanasius) Afanasy Sakharov was a Russian Orthodox saint and hymnographer, canonized in 2000. His full title was “Saint Athanasius Sakharov, Confessor-of-faith, Bishop of Kovrov”.

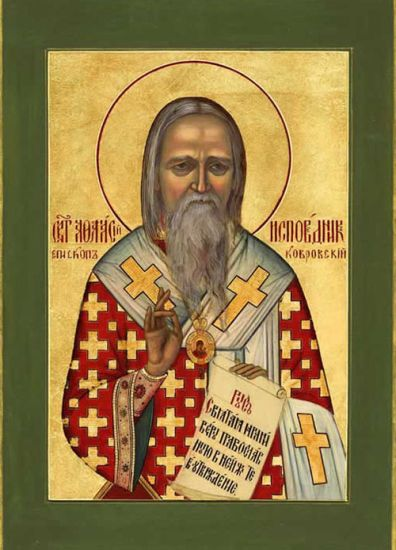
Modern Russian Orthodox icon of Saint Athanasius Sakharov

== Early life ==
Saint Athanasius Sakharov (birth name: Sergei Sakharov) was born on 2 July 1887 in the Tsarevka Village in the Tambov Governorship. Throughout his early life, Saint Athanasius and his family lived in the Russian city of Vladimir. Athanasius’ father, Gregory Zakharov, was a civil-ranking Court Councillor, whilst Athanasius’ mother, Matrona, was from a peasant family.

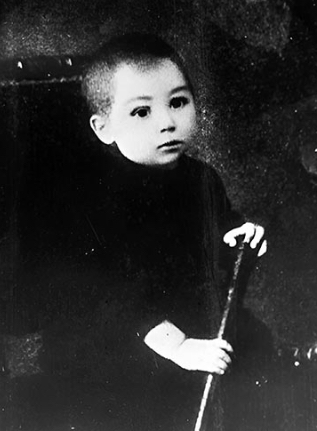
An image of a young, Saint Athanasius Sakharov, holding a Bishop's Crozier. The image was taken in 1889, when Athanasius was 2 years old.

When Athanasius was 1 1/2 years old, his father died. After Athanasius’ father's death, Matrona's piety increased and she took on the monastic lifestyle, which greatly influenced Athanasius’ spiritual life. During this period, the boy was very keen on attending lengthy Church Services and Liturgies. Even though he was young, Saint Athanasius considered himself a servant of the church and told all his friends and classmates of his desire to achieve priesthood. At a young age, Athanasius learned to sew, a skill which he used to sew Church vestments and to embroider many icon coverings.

== Education ==
Athanasius Sakharov found his education difficult, but he didn't slacken his efforts, and unexpectedly at the end of the school year he graduated at the top of the class. Impressively, at the age of 12 he wrote his first troparion to the Shuisk-Smolensk icon of the Mother of God.

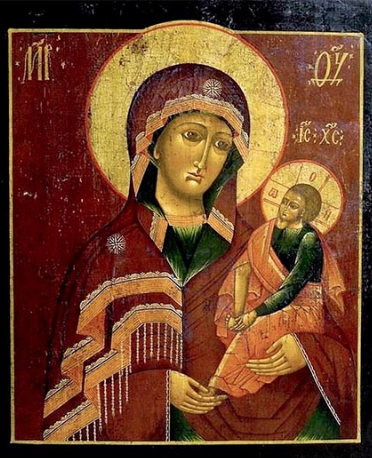
Icon of the Shuisk-Smolensk Mother of God.

After finishing his primary education, Athanasius entered a religious seminary in his hometown Vladimir. As a religious seminary student, Athanasius displayed a talent at ignoring temptations. A clandestine chapter of the seminary ended, when one of its leaders died due to mishandling explosives. In the summer of 1901, revolutionary seminary students held a secret meeting later resulting in a riot amongst the students in December, when they went on strike refusing to attend the seminary. During this period, Athanasius was not interested in boycotting the seminary due to his refusal in taking part in politics. Eventually after graduating from the Vladimir Seminary, he transferred to the Moscow Theological Academy. During his time at the Academy, he took on a monastic tonsure, taking the name Athanasius after Athanasius of Alexandria. In 1912, Athanasius graduated from the Academy with a degree in theology.

== Church Life ==
In 1918, Athanasius Sakharov was invited to attend the kocal Russian Orthodox Council in the city of Vladimir, Russia and from 1918 to 1920 he was invited to join the Diocesan Vladimir Association. On 20 January 1920 he was raised to the rank of the Archimandrite becoming the Abbot of the Nativity of the Theotokos Monastery in his home town of Vladimir, Russia.

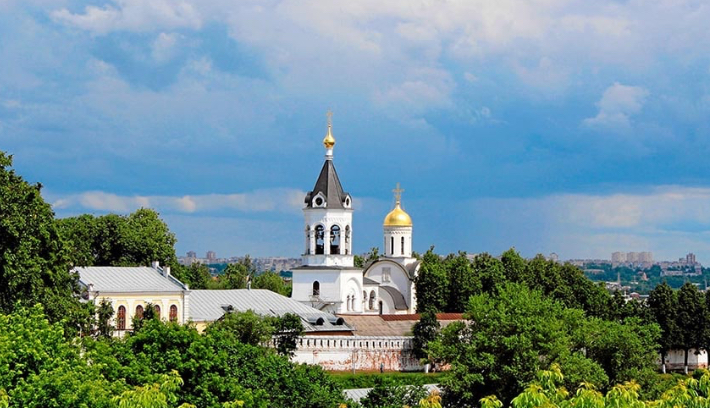
Monastery of the Nativity of the Theotokos, in Vladimir

In Pre-Revolutionary Russia the chance of being a Bishop brought many privileges but in the 1920s it sometimes became a pretext for one to be tortured and persecuted for one's beliefs. But despite this, Athanasius Sakharov accepted the opportunity of becoming Bishop of Vladimir-Suzdal. On the eve of his Ordination, he was bought to the Secret police headquarters where he was threatened and reprimanded for his choice to become a bishop, but he still took on the role. He was determined to “lead his flock” and was arrested only several months after his ordination.

== Imprisonment and Torture ==
His first arrest occurred in March 1922, after his refusal to step down from his title as Bishop of Vladimir-Suzdal. Initially he was sentenced to be imprisoned for a year, but he was pardoned and released without serving his full term. However, Bishop Athanasius was rearrested and sentenced to be exiled to Ust-Sysolsk in Eastern Siberia for refusing “renewalist-schism”. After his first imprisonment he was ordained the bishop of Kovrov, because he taught about Orthodoxy in Russia, even in his prison cell. Of his 42 years as Bishop, he spent 33 of those years in exile or imprisonment. He served his time in many prison such as: Onega, Kargopol, Mariinsk, Temnikov, Dubravlag and several concentration camps in Siberia. The rest of his 33 years were spent completing hard challenging jobs such as felling trees, building roads, making "lapti" (bast shoes), cleaning manure and many other difficult jobs. Sakharov did not eagerly wait for his trial to end; instead he persisted in his faith for Christ. He wrote a letter to his community saying, "I am far better off here than at liberty, and I am saying so without the slightest exaggeration. The true Orthodox Church is here".
