= Leontios of Neapolis =

Leontios (Greek: Λεόντιος Νεαπόλεως) was a bishop of Neapolis (Limassol) in Cyprus in the 7th century. He wrote a Life of John the Merciful, commissioned by the archbishop of Constantia Arcadius; a Life of Simeon the Holy Fool; a lost Life of Spyridon, an apologia against the Jews and another apologia in defence of icons. His apologia in defence of the icons was read by the bishop of Constantia, Constantine II at the Second Council of Nicaea that focused on the Byzantine Iconoclasm. His works are considered among the few giving any insight into the vernacular Greek of Early and Middle Byzantium. He was probably present at the Lateran council in Rome in 649. His work was translated in Latin and published in Patrologia Graeca. He is also credited with a Dialogue with a Jew, containing a defense of the Christian veneration of images, fragments of which are quoted in the treatise On the Holy Images of John Damascene and in the Acts of the Council of Nicea of 787.

== Publications ==
- Leontii Neapoleos in Cipro Episcopi. Opera Omnia (1865) Greek original with parallel Latin translation.
- Leontios’ von Neapolis: Leben des helligen Johannes des Barmherzigen (1893) German Translation.
