= Ludovico Morbioli =

Italian beatified Catholic (1433–1485)

Blessed Ludovico Morbioli
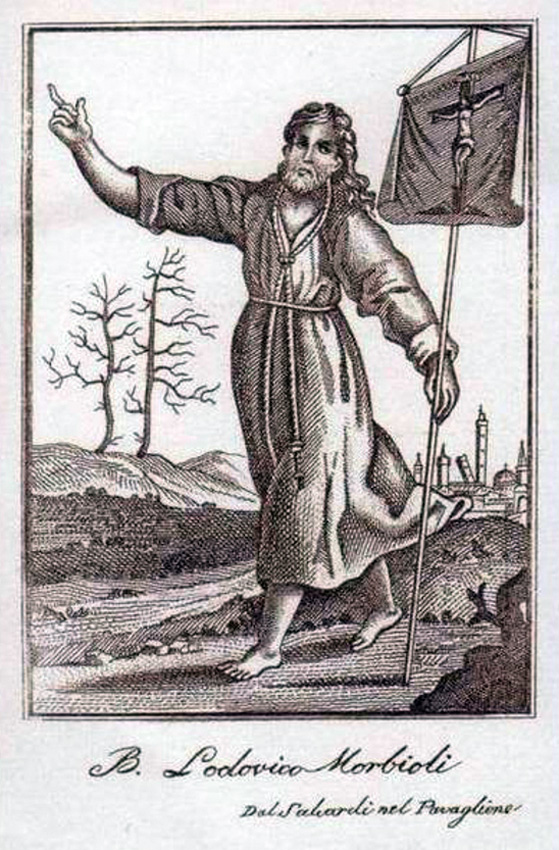

Religious
- Born: 1433; Bologna
- Died: 9 November 1485 (aged 52); Bologna
- Venerated in: Roman Catholic Church
- Beatified: 24 October 1843, Saint Peter's Basilica by Pope Gregory XVI
- Feast: 9 November
- Attributes: Crucifix with banner

Ludovico Morbioli (1433 - 9 November 1485) was an Italian Roman Catholic from Bologna who led a dissolute life before adopting a life of repentance. Morbioli was married but separated from his wife after experiencing a sudden religious conversion in Venice during a grave illness - he forever wandered the streets preaching on penance and the need for personal mortifications. His use of a white habit has given rise to misconceptions that he was part of the Carmelite Order when he was not.

Morbioli's beatification received full approval on 24 October 1843 after Pope Gregory XVI confirmed the late penitent's longstanding and enduring local 'cultus' - or popular veneration.

== Life ==
Ludovico Morbioli was born in 1433 in Bologna to Francesco Antonio and Agnes Morbioli as one of six children (five males and one female).

He led a dissolute life of vice that included drinking and other forms of pleasure-seeking.

Morbioli married Lucia Tura - the daughter of Giovanni who knew Morbioli's father. In 1462 he relocated to Venice where he was stricken with a serious illness which prompted him to be taken to the Canons Regular of Saint Salvatore for aid and in order to recuperate. It was during his time of recuperation that he underwent a profound spiritual crisis that challenged him to the core and resulted in his determination to make a radical change to his own life - one of penance for his earlier misdeeds.

He returned to Bologna sometime in 1470 in order to start a life of penitence with austerities he would undertake as a particular penance. He separated from his wife and put on a plain shirt - hence being confused for a Carmelite - and then put on a white one with a cross on his chest that he wore all the time. He preached penance and self-mortification to the people that he encountered and he would often go with those condemned to the scaffold for merciful comfort and solace. He visited Modena and Ferrara on a mule and travelled with a cross in his hands. He slept on the pavement and in other places like the homeless did and he let his hair become wild and his beard grow.

He spent his last months in a basement that he transformed into a cell like those in convents. Morbioli fell ill and refused each kind of relief to help him recover but his refusal led to his peaceful death on the basement floor on 9 November 1485. His remains were interred in the Cathedral of Saint Peter but could not later be relocated in its restoration that took place under Cardinal Gabriele Paleotti from 1566 until 1597. His remains have not been uncovered.

== Beatification ==
The beatification process commenced under Pope Innocent X in 1654 after being titled as a Servant of God while Cardinal Girolamo Boncompagni inaugurated the process; this process never completed and the cause was suspended despite such a popular 'cultus' - or popular veneration - to the late Morbioli.
