= John of Moscow =

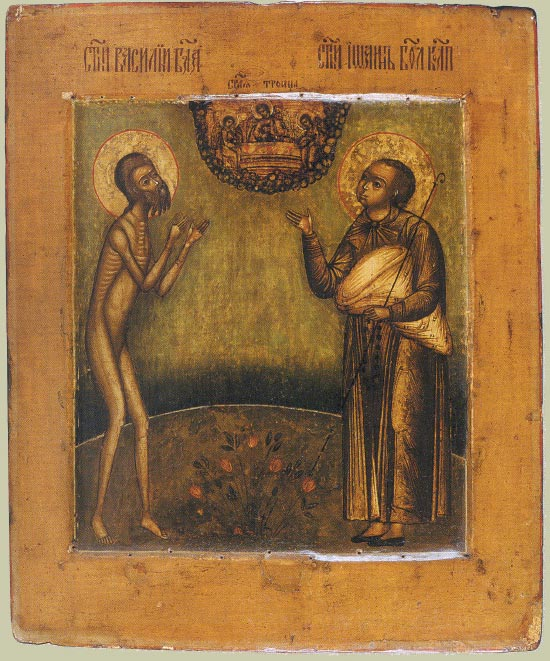
Icon of Blessed Basil (left) and Blessed John of Moscow, Fools for Christ, 17th century (Andrei Rublev Museum, Andronikov Monastery, Moscow).

John of Moscow also known as Blessed John the Fool for Christ was a 16th-century Russian saint. He was born on the outskirts of Vologda in Russia. He was considered a wonderworker in Moscow and spent his youth as a labourer in a local saltworks and as a water-carrier. John made his work a spiritual discipline in conjunction with a strict commitment to fasting and personal prayer.

Eventually he relocated to the community of Rostov, where he began his exploit of holy foolishness for the sake of Christ.

He wore chains with heavy iron crosses, and on his head was a heavy iron cap, for which they called him "John Big-Cap". In Moscow he went barefoot and almost naked in even the most severe frost, and he foretold the great misfortunes for Russia, the Time of Troubles and the incursion of the Poles, saying that "in Moscow will be many visible and invisible devils."

John is said to have spoken the truth without fear, even to those of the highest social or political status such the Czar of Russia himself, Boris Godunov.

Before death St. John indicated for himself a grave at the Pokrov church on Rva, afterwards called the Cathedral of Basil the Great. Having prepared himself for the grave, he removed the chains and showered himself with water three times. Before his death (+ 1589) the blessed one displayed the gift of healing. He was venerated at Moscow as a great wonderworker and seer. On June 12, 1672 his relics were uncovered, resting beneath a crypt in one of the chapels of the Cathedral of Basil the Great. The Service and Life were preserved in manuscripts of the seventeenth century.

Blessed John of Moscow is commemorated 3 July by the Eastern Orthodox Church.

== See also ==
- Foolishness for Christ
- Ascetic
- Eastern Christianity
- Basil Fool for Christ
- Xenia of Saint Petersburg
- John the Hairy
