= Xenia of Saint Petersburg =

Russian saint

Saint Xenia of St. Petersburg
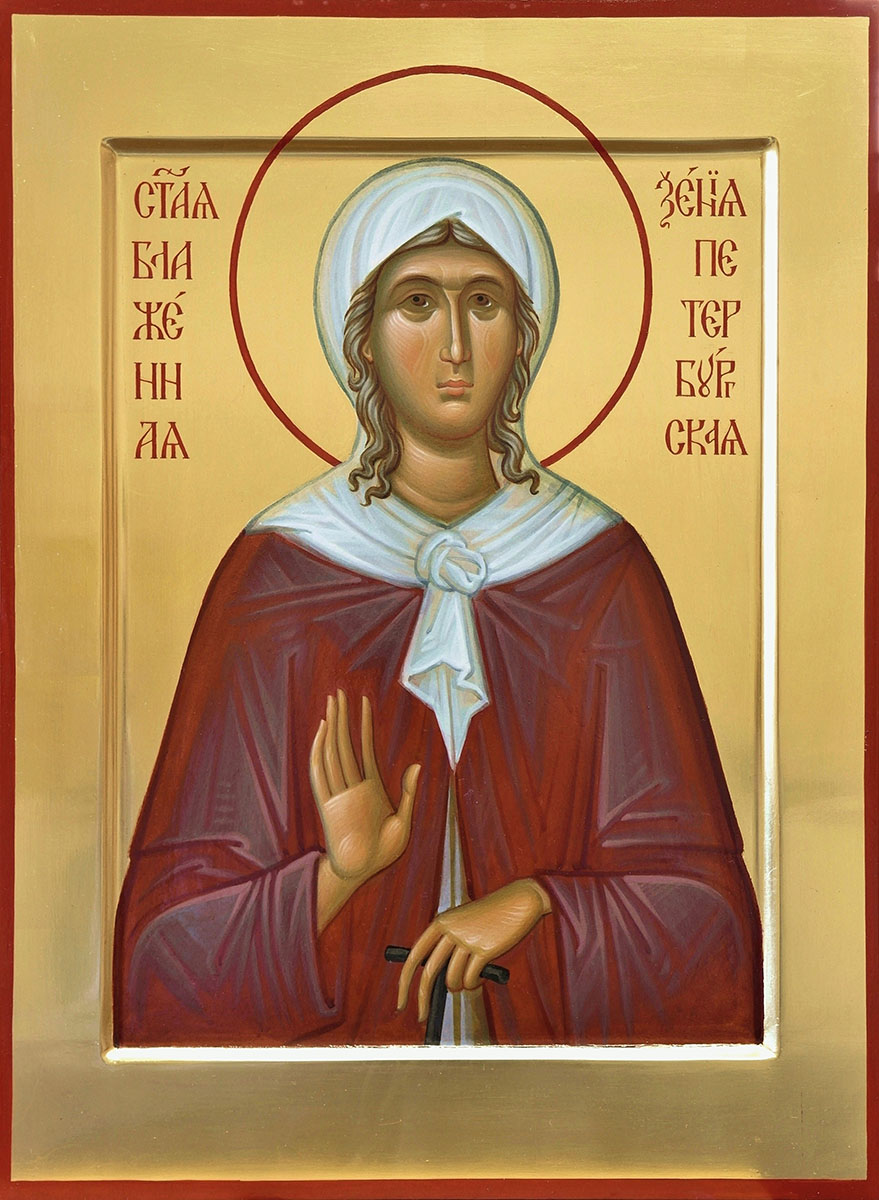
- Modern icon
- Born: Xenia Grigoryevna Petrova c. 1719–1730; Saint Petersburg, Russian Empire
- Died: c. 1803; Saint Petersburg, Russian Empire
- Venerated in: Orthodox Church
- Canonized: 1978 and 1988, United States and Russia by Russian Orthodox Church Abroad and the Russian Orthodox Church
- Major shrine: Smolensky Cemetery, Saint Petersburg, Russia
- Feast: January 24; February 6
- Attributes: Wearings rug garments with old Admiral jacket with cross and staff in her hands
- Patronage: Saint Petersburg

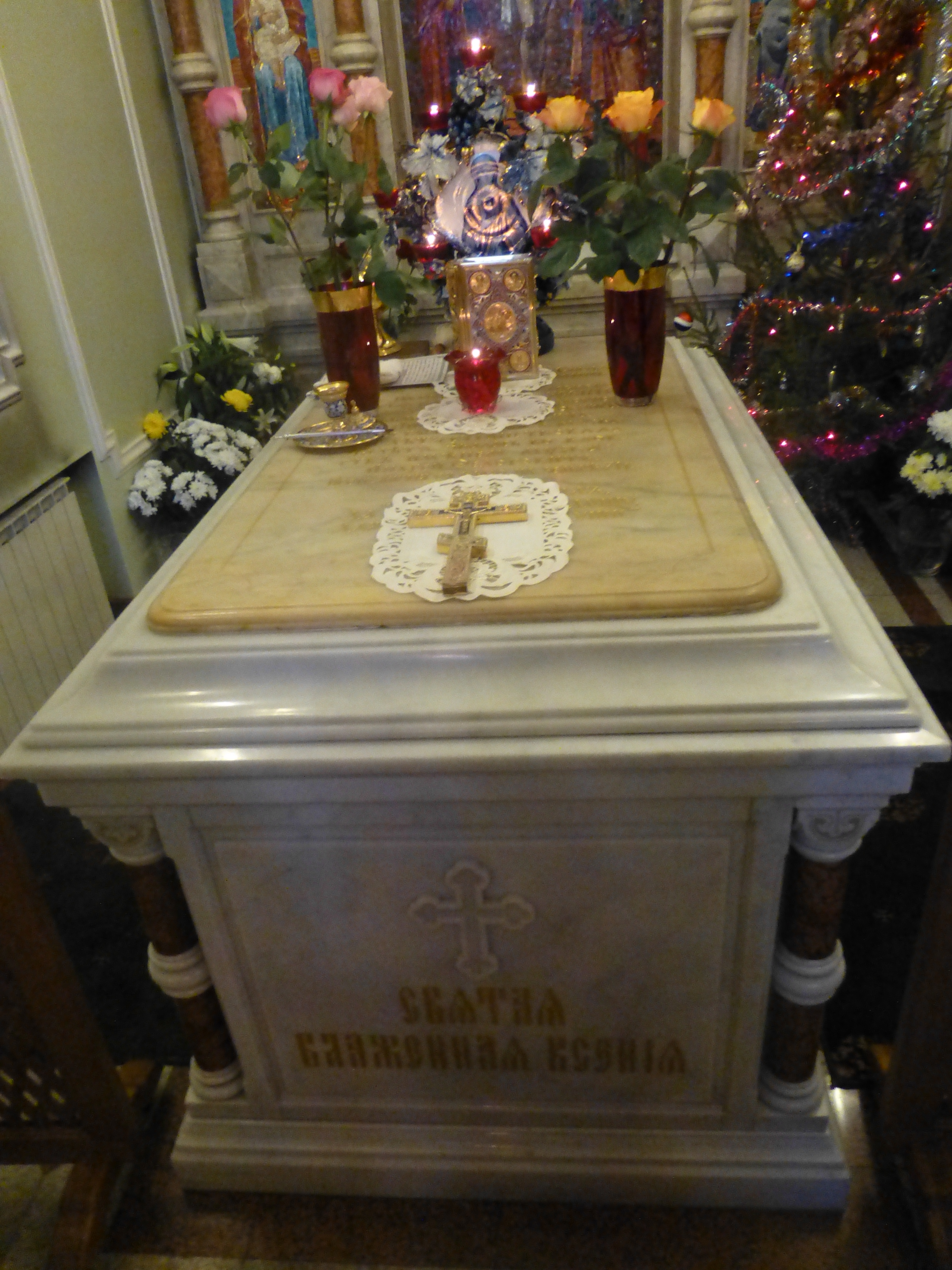
Sarcophagus of Blessed Xenia in a chapel in the Smolensky Cemetery in St. Petersburg

Xenia of St. Petersburg (Russian: Святая блаженная Ксения Петербургская, born as Xenia Grigoryevna Petrova (Russian: Ксения Григорьевна Петрова), c. 1719–1730 – c. 1803) is a patron saint of St. Petersburg, who according to tradition, gave all her possessions to the poor after her husband died.

== Life ==
Her husband had been Colonel Andrey Fyodorovich Petrov, a chanter at the Saint Andrew Cathedral. After his death, Xenia became a "fool-for-Christ" and for 45 years wandered around the streets of St. Petersburg, usually wearing her late husband's military uniform.

== Veneration ==
Xenia's grave is in the Smolensky Cemetery of St. Petersburg. It has been marked by an ornate chapel since 1902. She was canonized by the Russian Orthodox Church Outside Russia on September 24, 1978 (O. S. September 11, 1978) in the Synodal Cathedral of Our Lady of the Sign in New York, USA and by the Russian Orthodox Church on June 6, 1988, during the Local Council of the Russian Orthodox Church. Her feast day in the Old Style Calendar is January 24, which is February 6 in the New Calendar. In July 2020, the Holy Synod of the Romanian Orthodox Church also resolved to include Xenia of St. Petersburg in its calendar on January 24.

As a saint, she is noted for her intercessions in helping those with employment, marriage, the homeless, for fires, for missing children, and for a spouse. She is venerated in several countries. There are about 40 churches and chapels built in her name.

== Literary references ==
Xenia is a major figure in the historical fiction novel The Mirrored World by Debra Dean.

== See also ==
- Basil Fool for Christ
- Blessed John of Moscow the Fool-For-Christ
- John the Hairy
