= Basil Fool for Christ =

Russian saint (1468–1552/1557)

Saint Vasily the Blessed
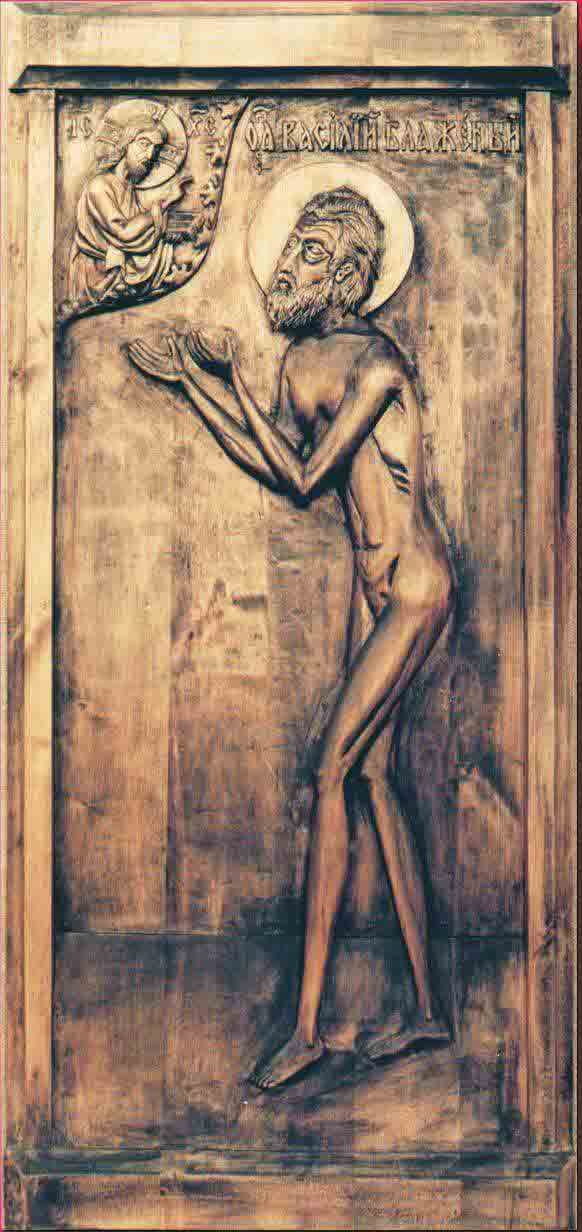
- Icon of St. Vasily the Blessed (Bas relief, St. Basil's Cathedral, Moscow)

Fool for Christ and Wonderworker
- Born: December 1468; Yelokhovo
- Died: 2 August 1552 or 1557 (aged 83 or 88); Moscow, Russia
- Venerated in: Eastern Orthodox Church; Eastern Catholicism
- Canonized: 2 August 1588, Moscow by Russian Orthodox Church
- Major shrine: Saint Basil's Cathedral, Moscow
- Feast: 2 August (15 August N.S.)
- Attributes: Dressed in rags, with chains, or completely naked

Vasily the Blessed (known also as Basil, and as the fool for Christ; the Wonderworker of Moscow; or Blessed Vasily of Moscow; Russian: Василий Блаженный, romanized: Vasily Blazhenny; 1468 – 1552/1557) was a Russian fool for Christ (yurodivy) who is venerated as a saint of the Russian Orthodox Church.

== Life ==
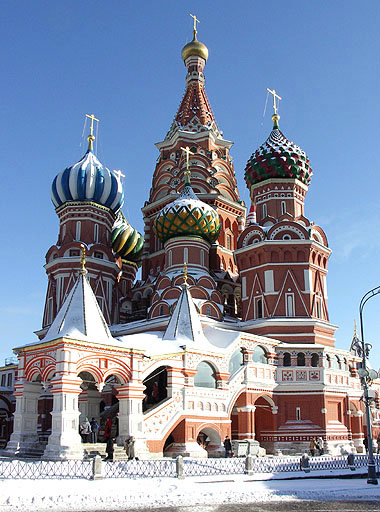
The Intercession Cathedral in Moscow is named after the saint.

Vasily was born to a serf family in December 1468 at the portico of the Epiphany Cathedral at Yelokhovo (now in Moscow). His father was named Jacob and his mother Anna.

Originally an apprentice shoemaker, he went to Moscow when he was sixteen. There he helped those who were ashamed to ask for alms, but were in need of help. He adopted a lifestyle of poverty; donating to the poor and hungry who were too ashamed to ask for alms when he could. He went naked and weighed himself down with chains. He rebuked Ivan the Terrible for not paying attention in church. Vasily was said to have the gift of prophecy.

When he died on 2 August 1552, or 1557, St. Macarius, Metropolitan of Moscow, served his funeral with many clergy. He is buried in St. Basil's Cathedral in Moscow, which was commissioned by Ivan for commemoration of his conquest of Kazan and was named for the saint later. Vasily was formally canonised in 1588. His feast day is celebrated on 2 August (15 August, N.S.).

== See also ==
- Blessed John of Moscow the Fool-For-Christ
- Foolishness for Christ
- Hell icon
- John the Hairy
- Xenia of Saint Petersburg

== Sources ==
- "Василий Блаженный" . Brockhaus and Efron Encyclopedic Dictionary (in Russian). 1906.
- Attwater, Donald; John, Catherine Rachel. The Penguin Dictionary of Saints. 3rd edition. New York: Penguin Books, 1993. ISBN 0-14-051312-4.
- Yerusalimsky, K. Yu.; Preobrazhensky, A. S. (2004). "Василий Блаженный". Православная энциклопедия — Т. VII: Варшавская епархия — Веротерпимость. Православная энциклопедия. pp. 123–131. ISBN 5-89572-010-2.
