= Vasili, Prince of Yaroslavl =

Vasili (died 1345) was the ruling prince of the principality of Yaroslavl from 1321 to 1345. Some sources refer to him as Vasili Davidovich, others as Vasili Mikhailovich. He was nicknamed "Horrible Eyes" (Russian: Грозные Очи, "Groznye Ochi").

Vasili ruled the principality of Yaroslavl at a time when Moscow was expanding and seeking supremacy over other principalities in northeastern Russia. He succeeded Duke David, who was made a saint of the Russian Orthodox Church.

== Ancestry ==
Genealogical sources give conflicting accounts of his paternity, so the patronymic is not clearly known. However, it is clear that he was a direct male-line descendant of Saint Theodore the Black, Duke of Mozhajsk (d. 1298). He was either his grandson or great-grandson, but not his son.

Some standard works, including Schwennicke's Europäische Stammtafeln volume II, identify Vasili as a son or grandson of Mikhail Fedorovich (born in the 1260s; died in the 1280s), the eldest son of Saint Theodore the Black. However, some Russian genealogies say that he was a son of his predecessor, Duke David Fedorovich (the saint), a younger son of Saint Theodore the Black.

== Life ==
In or around the 1330s, Duke Vasili married Evdokia, a daughter of Ivan Kalita, Grand Prince of Moscow. However, the new son-in-law did not acknowledge the overlordship of Moscow, but instead willfully called himself the Grand Prince of Yaroslavl.

Ivan Kalita's priority at that time was to break the power of Tver, which was a serious contender to Moscow. In 1339, Ozbeg Khan summoned to the Golden Horde two princes who opposed Ivan Kalita's demands: Alexander Mikhailovich of Tver and Vasili of Yaroslavl. Ivan Kalita feared that joint action by these princes would cause trouble for him. Prince Romanchuk of Belozero was a third there. A detachment of 500 men were sent to seize Vasili, but he escaped with his men and reached the Horde safely. In the end, though, Kalita's opponents failed to shake Khan Uzbek's confidence in the Moscow ruler.

In 1340 Ivan Kalita died, and Princes Alexander of Tver, Vasili of Yaroslavl and Konstantin of Suzdal laid claim to overlordship over his title and position. They asked the Horde to decide between them and to make an appointment. Ultimately, however, the khan chose Ivan Kalita's son Simon. Vasili had to accept and to recognize the primacy of the new Moscow prince. In the same year he, like all the other princes nearby, took part in the march of Muscovite troops to Torzhok.

Vasili died in the winter of 1345 and was buried in the Transfiguration Cathedral in Yaroslavl Monastery of Our Saviour. From his marriage with Evdokia Ivanovna of Moscow he had three sons: Vasili Vasilievich, prince of Yaroslavl; Hleb Vasilievich and Roman Vasilievich (who became the Duke of Romanov). After the death of Vasili, the principality of Yaroslavl disintegrated into small principalities and completely succumbed to the power of Moscow.

== Sources ==
- Titov, Andrei Alexandrovich. Ярославский уезд. Историко-археологическое, этнографическое и статистическое описание ("Jaroslavsky county. Historical and archaeological, ethnographic and statistical description"). Moscow. Русские типографии, 1883.
- Vasil Davidovich on Rodovid.
- Ekzempljarsky AV, "Vasili Davidovich Terrible", Collegiate Dictionary, Brockhaus and Efron: In 86 volumes (82 tons and 4 additional). - SPb.: 1890-1907.
