= Principality of Yaroslavl =

Russian principality (1218–1463)

Principality of Yaroslavl Ярославское княжество (Russian)
- 1218–1463
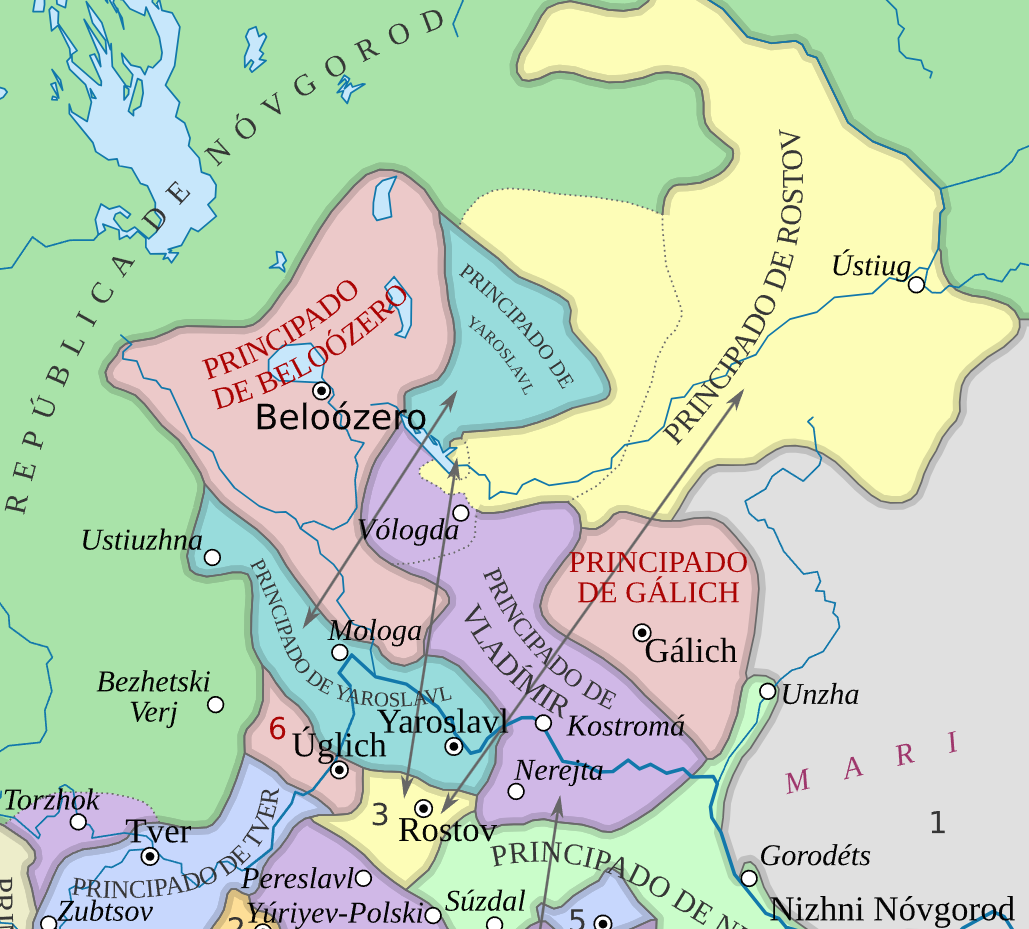
- Principality of Yaroslavl c. 1350
- Status: Principality
- Capital: Yaroslavl; 57°38′N 39°53′E
- Common languages: Russian
- Religion: Russian Orthodoxy
- Government: Monarchy
- History
  - Established: 1218
  - Disestablished: 1463
- Today part of: Russia

Yaroslavl (no. 10) in c. 1250

The Principality of Yaroslavl (Russian: Ярославское княжество, romanized: Yaroslavskoye knyazhestvo) was an independent principality with its capital in the city of Yaroslavl. It existed from 1218 until 1463 (de jure until 1471) when it became part of the Grand Duchy of Moscow.

== History ==
=== Foundation ===
The Principality of Yaroslavl separated from Vladimir-Suzdal when the sons of Konstantin Vsevolodovich divided his lands upon his death. Vsevolod Konstantinovich inherited the lands around Yaroslavl on both banks of the Volga River with its feeders — the Mologa, the Yukhot', the Ikhra, the Sit', the Sheksna and Lake Kubenskoye.

In 1238, the city was sacked by the Mongols during the Mongol invasions. In the Battle of the Sit River on March 4, 1238, Vsevolod Konstantinovich was killed and the Russians were defeated. As the result, the Mongol-Tatar yoke was established on the Principality of Yaroslavl and all the lands of northeastern Rus'.

In 1262, an uprising against the Mongol tribute collectors ended in the killing of all the local Tatars. The punitive attack was prevented by Alexander Nevsky, who went to the Golden Horde for negotiations.

=== During the Mongol-Tatar Yoke ===
Later, the sons of Vsevolod Konstantinovich ruled in the principality. Vasilii Vsevolodovich stayed in power from 1238 to 1249. His brother Konstantin Vsevolodovich ruled after his death. On 3 July 1257, the battle of Tugova Gora ended with another defeat of the Russians, and Konstantin Vsevolodovich was killed. Then a group of princes decided Vasilii's son-in-law should be ruler: Fedor Rostislavich Cherni, son of the ruler of Smolensk. His second wife was Anna, a daughter of the warlord Mengu-Timur.

In 1332, Ivan I of Moscow burnt down Yaroslavl under the Khan's orders. Then he forced the prince, Vasilii Davidovich Groznii to marry his daughter Yevdokia. Vasilii tried to be independent, adopting the title of grand prince and allying with Tver, but the Khan ordered him to stay loyal to Moscow.

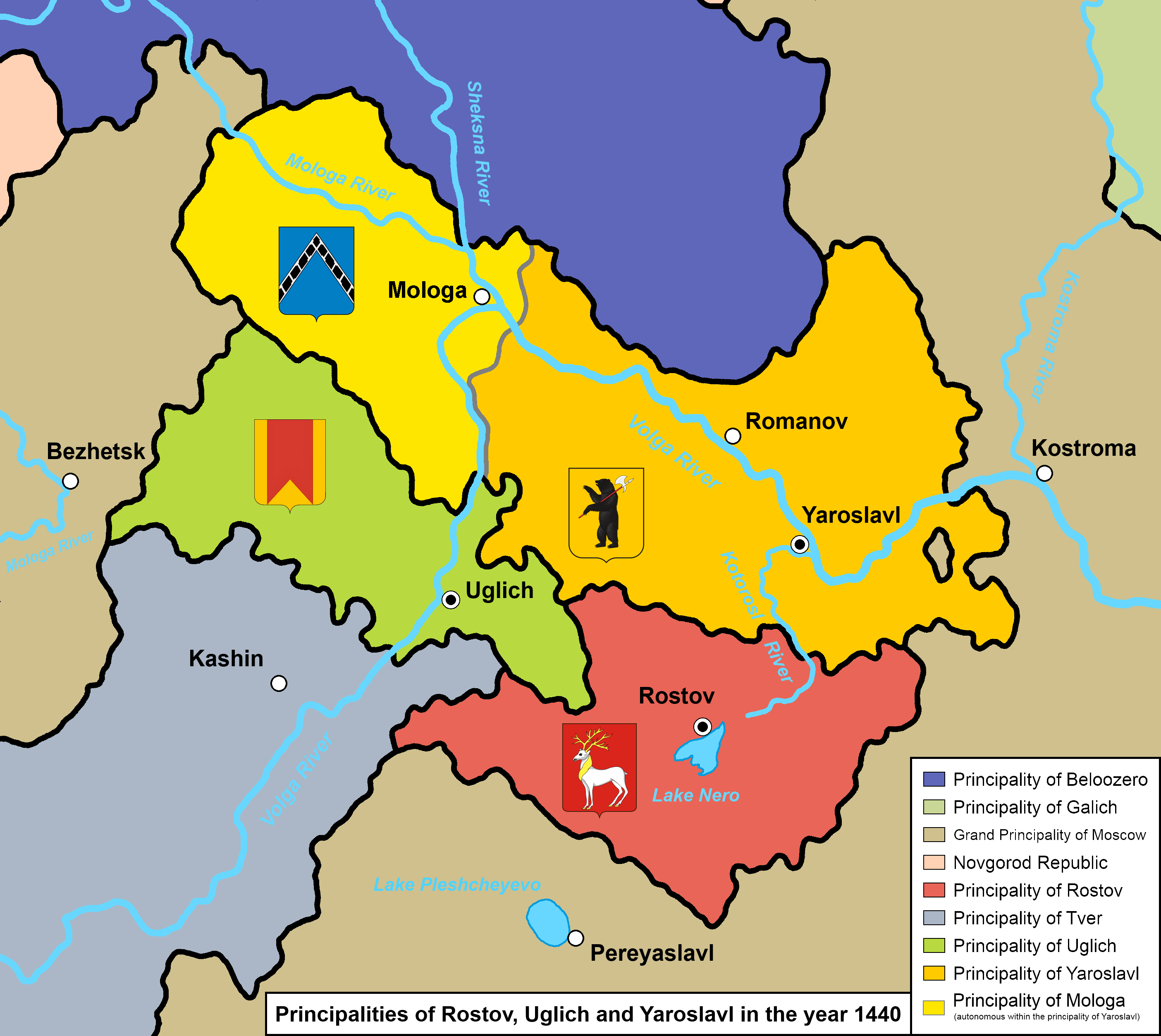
Principality of Yaroslavl in c. 1440

The last grand prince of Yaroslavl was Aleksandr Fedorovich Brukhatii who was forced to sign away the succession to Ivan III. Having emerged from the Principality of Rostov, in the 14th to 15th centuries it dissipated into udels, and was ultimately incorporated into the Grand Duchy of Moscow.

== List of rulers ==
- Vsevolod Konstantinovich (r. 1218 — 1238)
- Vasily Vsevolodovich (r. 1238 — 1249)
- Konstantin Vsevolodovich, Prince of Yaroslavl (r. 1249 — 1257)
- Maria-Anastasia Vasilievna, Princess regnant (r. 1257 — c. 1280s)
- Michael Theodorovich, under the regency of Ksenia (r. c. 1280s — c. 1290)
- Fyodor Rostislavich, co-ruler of Anastasia and then contested ruler against Michael (r. 1260 — 1299)
- David Fjodorovitch (r. 1299 — 1321)
- Konstantin Fyodorovich Ulemets, co-ruler of David (r. 1299 — c. 1321)
- Vasily Davidovich Groznye Ochi (r. 1321 — 1345)
- Vasily Vasilyevich, Prince of Yaroslavl (r. 1345 — c. 1380)
- Ivan Vasilyevich Bolshoi (r. c. 1380 — 1426)
- Fyodor Vasilyevich, Prince of Yaroslavl (r. 1426 — 1434)
- Aleksandr Fyodorovich Bryukhaty (r. 1434 — de facto 1463 or de jure 1471)

== Sources ==
- Egorov, V. L. Александр Невский и Золотая Орда [Alexander Nevsky and the Golden Horde] (in Russian). Novgorod: Novgorod State Museum.
