= List of Russian saints (until 15th century) =

The following list includes people canonised as saints by the Metropolis of Kiev and all Rus' saints from the 9th century until the 15th century, when the 15th–16th century Moscow–Constantinople schism occurred. Most of these are Russians in the most different sense, while others are essential and important people in Russian history. The period in which the saint was canonized is listed in the Number (#) column. The Portrait column typically illustrates the saint on icons or frescos, next to it are the name of the saint and his title, repeated just below in Russian. The following column describes in abbreviated form the saint's life and legacy. Name dates are listed in both old and new style dates, following a more precise date description. The Canonization column may list both local and church-wide canonizations; a question mark means an unknown date, but definite canonization, and a simple date without the type of canonization in brackets means a doubtful type of canonization.

== Chronological list ==
Rulers/Monarchs Heads of Church

Key to Periods
1. 9th century – 1547
2. 1547 and 1549 (Macarius Councils)
3. 1550–1721 (pre-Petrine period)
4. 1721–1894 (Synodal period)
5. 1894–1917 (Nicholas II period)
6. 1917–1987 (post-revolutionary period)
7. From 1988 (post-Soviet period).

#	Portrait	Saint title (s) / Name	Short description Reason for canonization	Name date(s) (O.S. & N.S.)	Canonized	Ref.
		Apostle Andrew the First-Called (☦ 62) Святой апостол Андрей Первозванный	Apostle Andrew preached in the Eastern lands (Caucasus, Eastern Europe) to Scythians and Slavs. Legend has it that Apostle Andrew raised a cross where the city of Kiev would one day be; patron saint of Russia and its Navy	30 November; 13 December; 27th Week after Pentecost; Седмица 27-я по Пятидесятнице	Natural canonization	
7		Hieromartyrs Ephraim, Basilius, Eugenius, Elpidius, Agaphodorus, Epherius and Сapiton of Chersones (4th century) Священномученики Ефрем, Василий, Евгений, Елпидий, Агафодор, Еферий и Капитон, епископы Херсонесские	Episcopes of Chersonesus; preached in a difficult time of Christian persecutions by pagans during Diocletian's rule Ephraim and Basilius were sent to Chersonesos to spread Christianity; Ephraim was beheaded by Scythian pagans; Basilius resumed enlightening people, but was expelled and cloistered himself into a cave, when once he made alive a person with blessed water and the people there took baptism; he was stoned to death by Jews Eugenius, Elpidius and Agaphodorus were episcopes in the Dardanelles, who moved to Chersonesus, but were martyred the same way as Basilius; Epherius moved to Chersonesus, and living in peace under Constantine's rule, built a church there Capiton was sent by Constantine to help Epherius, but on the way to Constantinople his ship was eventually looted and he was drowned by pagans	7 March; 20 March; 3rd Week of the Great Lent; Седмица 3-я Великого поста	1988 (church-wide)	
5		Equal-to-apostles, First Teachers and Slavic Enlighteners Cyrill (☦ 862) and Methodius (☦ 885) Равноапостольные первоучители и просветители славянские Кирилл и Мефодий	Preachers of Christianity in the East; sent to teach the Slavs	Cyrill 14 February; 27 February; Cheese-fare Week; Седмица сырная (масленица) – сплошная	1909 (church-wide); 1863 (local)	
5		Equal-to-apostles, First Teachers and Slavic Enlighteners Cyrill (☦ 862) and Methodius (☦ 885) Равноапостольные первоучители и просветители славянские Кирилл и Мефодий	Preachers of Christianity in the East; sent to teach the Slavs	Cyrill and Methodius 11 May; 24 May; 5th Week after Pascha; Седмица 5-я по Пасхе	1909 (church-wide); 1863 (local)	
1		Equal-to-apostles, Great Princess Olga, baptized Elena (☦ 969) Равноапостольная великая княгиня Ольга, во святом крещении Елена	The first woman ruler of Rus' (regent); the first Christian among the Russian rulers; while she could not baptize her country, her grandson Vladimir resumed her Christianization	11 July; 24 July; 7th Week after Pentecost; Седмица 7-я по Пятидесятнице	mid-13th century	
		Protomartyrs, Theodore and John the Varyags (☦ 983) Первомученики Феодор и Иоанн Варяжские	First known martyrs on the Rus'; Theodore baptized after raid on Byzantine; after he and his son John were chosen as sacrifices for a pagan ritual by the order of then-pagan Vladimir I, they were brutally murdered by the raving crowd after preaching Christianity	12 July; 25 July; 7th Week after Pentecost; Седмица 7-я по Пятидесятнице	?	
4		Enlightener Metropolitan Michael I of Kiev (☦ 983) Святитель Михаил, митрополит Киевский	1st Metropolitan of Kiev, Metropolitan of all Rus; Mikhail was a Syrian who was sent by Nicholas II of Constantinople after Baptism of the Rus; probably founded the St. Michael's Golden-Domed Monastery and the Mezhyhirya Monastery; preached Christianity and demolished pagan idols	30 September; 13 October; 19th Week after Pentecost; Седмица 19-я по Пятидесятнице	(1730) (Note: Translation of the relics, by the order of Elizabeth I) (church-wide)	
6		Passion-bearer George the Hungarian (☦ 1015) Страстотерпец Георгий Угрин	Brother of ven. Ephraim of Torzhok	28 January; 10 February; Fast-free week Седмица сплошная	1979 (church-wide); 1904 (local)	
1		Equal-to-apostles Grand Prince Vladimir the Great, baptized Basil (☦ 1015) Равноапостольный Великий князь Владимир, во святом крещении Василий	8th Grand Prince of Kiev who turned from pagan to saint through his Baptism of the Rus'	15 July; 28 July; 8th Week after Pentecost; Седмица 8-я по Пятидесятнице	after 1240 (local and church-wide)	
1		Right-Believing martyrs Princes Boris and Gleb, baptized Roman and David (☦ 1015) Мученики Благоверные князья Борис и Глеб, во святом крещении Роман и Давид	Children of Vladimir the Great, the first saints canonized in the Rus', the first Russians canonized by the Constantinople Orthodox Church; killed by insidious and power-seeking Sviatopolk	24 July; 6 August; 9th Week after Pentecost; Седмица 9-я по Пятидесятнице	1072	
1		Enlightener Theodore, bishop of Rostov and Suzdal (☦ 1023) Святитель Феодор, епископ Ростовский и Суздальский	First episcope of Rostov and Suzdal	8 June; 21 June; 2nd Week after Pentecost; Седмица 2-я по Пятидесятнице	(1237)	
4		Venerable Moses the Hungarian of the Caves (☦ 1043) Преподобный Моисей Угрин Киево-Печерский	Monk in the Kiev Cave Monastery, who spent seven years as a Polish prisoner after the 1018 Kiev Expedition	26 July; 8 August; 9th Week after Pentecost; Седмица 9-я по Пятидесятнице	1762 (church-wide); 1643 (local)	
1		Right-Believing princess Anna of Novgorod, baptized Irina (☦ 1050) Благоверная княгиня Анна, во святом крещении Ирина, Новгородская	Princess of Kiev and Novgorod, second wife of Yaroslav the Wise, daughter of Olaf, the first Christian king of Sweden	10 February; 23 February; Meat-fare Sunday, Week of the Last Judgement; Седмица мясопустная, о Страшнем суде	1439 (local)	
2		Right-Believing prince Vladimir of Novgorod (☦ 1052) Благоверный Владимир, князь Новгородский	Prince of Novgorod, son of Yaroslav the Wise and Anna of Sweden	4 October; 17 October; 19th Week after Pentecost; Седмица 19-я по Пятидесятнице	1549 (church-wide); 1439 (local)	
3		Venerable Ephraim of Torzhok (1053) Преподобный Ефрем Новоторжский	A Hungarian who, having moved to Rus' with his brothers, preached Christianity and established a monastery in what is now Torzhok	28 January; 10 February; Fast-free week Седмица сплошная	1584-7 (local)	
4		Venerable Barlaam of the Caves (☦ 1065) Преподобный Варлаам, Игумен Печерский	The first abbot (hegumen) of the Kiev Caves	19 November; 2 December; 26th Week after Pentecost; Седмица 26-я по Пятидесятнице	1762 (church-wide); 1643 (local)	
4		Venerable Damian (☦ 1071), Jeremiah (☦ 1070) and Matthew (☦ 1088) of the Caves Преподобные Дамиан, Иеремия и Матфей, Печерские	Monks of the Caves; Damian was a healer, Jeremiah was a seer of thoughts and Matthew seer of demons	5 October; 18 October; 19th Week after Pentecost; Седмица 19-я по Пятидесятнице	1762 (church-wide); 1643 (local)	
1		Venerable Anthony of the Caves (☦ 1073) Преподобный Антоний Печерский	Co-founder of the Caves, one of the first monasteries in Russia; the "precursor of all Russian monks"	10 July; 23 July; 7th Week after Pentecost; Седмица 7-я по Пятидесятнице	1132–1231	
1		Enlightener Leontius, bishop of Rostov (☦ 1073) Святитель Леонтий, епископ Ростовский	Episcope of Rostov and Suzdal; missionary, the first of Kiev Caves monks who became bishop	23 May; 5 June; 7th Week after Pascha; Седмица 7-я по Пасхе	early 14th century (church-wide); 1190 (local)	
		Right-Believing, passion bearer Yaropolk Izyaslavich, baptized Peter (☦ 1086) Благоверный Князь Ярополк, во святом крещении Петр, Волынский страстотерпец	Prince of Volhynia and Turov, son of Iziaslav I of Kiev and Gertrude of Poland, grandchild of Yaroslav the Wise	22 November; 5 December; 26th Week after Pentecost; Седмица 26-я по Пятидесятнице	late 16th century or early 17th century	
4		Venerable Nikon, abbot of the Caves (☦ 1088) Преподобный Никон, Игумен Печерский	Monk and hegumen from the Caves; captured and enslaved by nomads until miraculously released	23 March; 5 April; 5th Week of the Great Lent Feast of the Annunciation (Sunday of the Akafist); Седмица 5-я Великого поста. Похвала Пресвятой Богородицы (Суббота Акафиста)	1762 (church-wide); 1643 (local)	
2		Enlightener Metropolitan John II of Kiev (☦ 1089) Святитель Иоанн, митрополит Киевский	9th Metropolitan of Kiev, Metropolitan of all Rus	31 August; 13 September; 14th Week after Pentecost; Седмица 14-я по Пятидесятнице	1547 (church-wide); 1439 (local)	
4		Venerable Isaac, hermit of the Caves (☦ 1090) Преподобный Исаакий, затворник Печерский	A hermit monk of the Caves; first Fool-for-Christ in the Rus'	14 February; 27 February; Cheese-fare Week; Седмица cырная (масленица) – сплошная	1762 (church-wide); 1643 (local)	
1		Enlightener Isaiah of Rostov (☦ 1090) Святитель Исаия, епископ Ростовский	Second episcope of Rostov and Suzdal; missionary in Vladimir-Suzdal	15 May; 28 May; 6th Week after Pascha; Седмица 6-я по Пасхе	1474 (church-wide) probably 1164 (local)	
4		Venerable, monkmartyr Gregory of the Caves (☦ 1093) Преподобный Григорий, Печерский чудотворец	Monk of the Caves; "Creator of Canons"; wondermaker	8 January; 21 January; 31st Week after Pentecost; Седмица 31-я по Пятидесятнице	1762 (church-wide); 1643 (local)	
4		Venerable Stephen of the Caves (☦ 1094) Преподобный Стефан Печерский, Епископ Владимиро-Волынский	Monk, pupil of Gregory of the Caves; episcope of Vladimir-Volhynia	27 April; 10 May; 3rd Week after Pascha; Седмица 3-я по Пасхе	1762 (church-wide); 1643 (local)	
4		Venerable Agapetus of the Caves (☦ 1095) Преподобный Агапит Печерский, Безмездный Врач	Henoch; Unmercenary Healer; one of the first physicians in the Rus', healed Prince Vladimir Monomach	1 June; 14 June; 1st Week after Pentecost (Low Week); Седмица 1-я по Пятидесятнице (сплошная)	1762 (church-wide); 1643 (local)	
4		Monkmartyr Eustratius of the Caves (☦ 1097) Преподобномученик Евстратий Печерский	Monkmartyr of the Caves	28 March; 10 April; 6th Week of the Great Lent (Palm Week); Седмица 6-я Великого поста (седмица ваий)	1762 (church-wide); 1643 (local)	
4		Monkmartyrs Basil and Theodore of the Caves (☦ 1098) Преподобномученики Василий и Феодор Печерские	Monkmartyrs of the Caves	11 August; 24 August; 11th Week after Pentecost); Седмица 11-я по Пятидесятнице	1762 (church-wide); 1643 (local)	
4		Venerable Ephraim of the Caves, bishop of Pereyaslavl (☦ 1098) Преподобный Ефрем Печерский, епископ Переяславский	Episcope of Pereyaslavl	28 January; 10 February; Palm Week; Седмица сплошная	1762 (church-wide); 1643 (local)	
3		Venerable Arсadius of Torzhok and Vyazma (11th century) Преподобный Аркадий Новоторжский и Вяземский	Student and cell attendant of Ephraim of Pereyaslavl	13 December; 26 December; 29th Week after Pentecost; Седмица 29-я по Пятидесятнице	1594	
1		Venerable Abraham of Rostov (11th century) Преподобный Авраамий Ростовский	Founder of the Abraham Epiphany Monastery in Rostov	29 October; 11 November; 23rd Week after Pentecost; Седмица 23-я по Пятидесятнице	late 15th – early 16th century	
4		Venerable Hilarion, schema-monk of the Caves (11th century) Преподобный Иларион, схимник Печерский	Strict ascetic, associate and student of ven. Theodosius († 1074). Prayed night and day with tears, keeping a strict fast. His contemporaries knew him as a copyist, who toiled both day and night over copying of books in the cell of ven. Theodosius. Hilarion was buried in the Far Caves.	28 August; 10 September; 14th Week after Pentecost; Седмица 14-я по Пятидесятнице	1762 (church-wide); 1643 (local)	
4		Venerable Prochor the Saltbusher of the Caves (☦ 1107) Преподобный Прохор Лебедник, Печерский Чудотворец	Monk who ate only prosphora from saltbush (from which he received his name) and drank only water; wondermaker	10 February; 23 February; Meat-fare Sunday, Week of the Last Judgement; Неделя мясопустная, о Страшнем суде	1762 (church-wide); 1643 (local)	
2		Enlightener Nicetas, hermit of the Caves, bishop of Novgorod (☦ 1108) Святитель Никита, затворник Печерский, епископ Новгородский	Hermit and monk; 6th episcope of Novgorod; performed several wonders; helped building churches	31 January; 13 February; Fast-free week Седмица сплошная	1547 (church-wide)	
4		Venerable Pimen the Much-Ailing of the Caves (☦ 1110) Преподобный Пимен Многоболезненный, Печерский	Hegumen; faster of the Caves	7 August; 20 August; 11th Week after Pentecost; Седмица 11-я по Пятидесятнице	1762 (church-wide); 1643 (local)	
4		Venerable Nestor the Chronicler of the Caves (☦ 1114) Преподобный Нестор летописец, Инок Печерский	Henoch; chronicler, author of the Primary Chronicle (the earliest East Slavic chronicle) and several hagiographies	27 October; 9 November; 22nd Week after Pentecost; Седмица 22-я по Пятидесятнице	1762 (church-wide); 1643 (local)	
4		Venerable Alypius the Icon Painter of the Caves (☦ 1114) Преподобный Алипий иконописец, Печерский	Monk; one of the first Russian icon painters	17 October; 30 October; 21st Week after Pentecost; Седмица 21-я по Пятидесятнице	1762 (church-wide); 1643 (local)	
4		Venerable Isaiah of the Caves (☦ 1115) Преподобный Исаия, Печерский чудотворец	Wondermaker of the Caves	15 May; 28 May; 6th Week after Pascha; Седмица 6-я по Пасхе	1762 (church-wide); 1643 (local)	
4		Enlightener Amphilochius, bishop of Vladimir-Volynsky (☦ 1122) Святитель Амфилохий, епископ Владимиро-Волынский	Henoch of Caves; later episcope of Vladimir-Volynsky; fought against superstition and pagan traditions by enlightening people	10 October; 23 October; 20th Week after Pentecost; Седмица 20-я по Пятидесятнице	? (church-wide); 1866 (local)	
4		Venerable, hieromartyrs Kuksha and Pimen the Faster of the Caves (☦ between 1114 and 1123) Преподобные священномученик Кукша и Пимен Постник, Печерские; wondermakers	Hieromonks; Kuksha could cast out demons, reduce rain and dry out lakes, beheaded by Vyatichi pagans; Pimen was a faster, healer	27 August; 9 September; 14th Week after Pentecost; Седмица 14-я по Пятидесятнице	1762 (church-wide); 1643 (local)	
4		Enlightener Theoctistus of Chernigov (☦ 1123) Святитель Феоктист, епископ Черниговский	Hegumen of the Caves; then episcope of Chernigov; pupil of Nicetas of the Caves; spiritual father of Davyd Svyatoslavich; build churches	5 August; 18 August; 14th Week after Pentecost; Седмица 11-я по Пятидесятнице	1762 (church-wide); 1643 (local)	
4		Venerable Mark the Grave Digger, John and Theophilos the Weepy of the Caves (☦ until 1125) Преподобные Марк Гробокопатель, Иоанн и Феофил Плачливый, иноки Печерского монастыря	Henochs of the Caves	29 December; 11 January; 31st Week after Pentecost, after Christmas; Седмица 31-я по Пятидесятнице, по Рождестве Христовом	1762 (church-wide); 1643 (local)	
2		Venerable Prince Constantine of Murom (☦ 1129) and his sons Michael and Theodore Благоверный князь Константин и чада его Михаил и Феодор, Муромские чудотворцы	Konstantin and his sons brought Christianity to the pagans of Murom; built churches, opened a faculty for episcopes; Michael was killed by pagans; Theodore survived and helped his father; wondermakers	21 May; 3 June; 7th Week after Pascha; Седмица 7-я по Пасхе	1553 (church-wide); 1547 (local)	
6		Right-Believing Grand Prince Mstislav I of Kiev, baptized Theodore (☦ 1132) Благоверный Великий князь Киевский Мстислав I, во Святом Крещении Феодор, Владимирович	15th Grand Prince of Kiev; benevolent, devout, magnanimous	15 April; 28 April; 2nd Week after Pascha; Седмица 2-я по Пасхе	1981 (church-wide)	
2		Right-Believing Prince Vsevolod of Pskov, baptized Gabriel (☦ 1138) Благоверный князь Всеволод, во святом крещении Гавриил, Псковский	16th Prince of Novgorod; built churches and cathedrals, helped the poor	11 February; 24 February; Cheese-fare Week; Седмица сырная (масленица) – сплошная	1549 (church-wide); 1192 or 1284 (local)	
4		Venerable Nikola the Pietist, Prince of Chernigovsk, wonderworker of the Caves (☦ 1143) Преподобный Никола Святоша, князь Черниговский, Печерский чудотворец	Prince of Chernigov, before baptism Svyatoslav, baptized Panсratius, then took the name Nikola after tonsure to monkhood; healer; known for his benevolence; wondermaker	14 October; 27 October; 21st Week after Pentecost; Седмица 21-я по Пятидесятнице	1762 (church-wide); 1643 (local)	
1		Blessed martyr Grand Prince Igor II of Kiev and Chernigov (☦ 1147) Блаженный Игорь, Великий Князь Черниговский и Киевский	Grand Prince of Kiev and Chernigov, baptized Gabriel, tonsured George	General 19 September; 2 October; 17th Week after Pentecost; Седмица 17-я по Пятидесятнице	1549 (church-wide); 1150 (local)	
1		Blessed martyr Grand Prince Igor II of Kiev and Chernigov (☦ 1147) Блаженный Игорь, Великий Князь Черниговский и Киевский	Grand Prince of Kiev and Chernigov, baptized Gabriel, tonsured George	Translation of the relics 5 July; 18 July; 6th Week after Pentecost; Седмица 6-я по Пятидесятнице	1549 (church-wide); 1150 (local)	
3		Venerable Anthony of Rome of Novgorod (☦ 1147) Преподобный Антоний Римлянин, Новгородский чудотворец	Wondermaker from Rome who came to Novgorod not knowing a single word of Russian; established the Antoniev Monastery	3 August; 16 August; 10th Week after Pentecost; Седмица 10-я по Пятидесятнице	1597 (church-wide)	
4		Venerable Onesiphorus the Perspicacious of the Caves (☦ 1147) Преподобный Онисифор Печерский, прозорливый	Presbyter of the Caves; clairvoyant	9 November; 22 November; 24th Week after Pentecost; Седмица 24-я по Пятидесятнице	1762 (church-wide); 1643 (local)	
2		Enlightener Niphont, bishop of Novgorod (☦ 1156) Святитель Нифонт, епископ Новгородский	9th episcope of the Caves, then of Novgorod	8 April; 21 April; Bright Week; Светлая седмица – сплошная	1549	
4		Venerable Abraham of Mirozha (☦ 1158) Преподобный Авраамий Мирожский	Builder and first hegumen of the Mirozhsky Monastery in Pskov	24 September; 7 October; 18th Week after Pentecost; Седмица 18-я по Пятидесятнице	17th century (church-wide) (until the early 17th century) (local)	
1		Blessed enlightener Metropolitan Сonstantine I of Kiev (☦ 1159) Блаженный Константин, митрополит Киевский	17th Metropolitan of Kiev, Metropolitan of all Rus	5 June; 18 June; 2nd Week after Pentecost; Седмица 2-я по Пятидесятнице	c. 1159	
4		Venerable Erasmus of the Caves (☦ around 1160) Преподобный Еразм Печерский	Henoch of the Caves; regretted that he did not donate his possession to the poor, and repented	24 February; 9 March; 1st Week of the Great Lent. The Triumph of Orthodoxy; Седмица 1-я Великого поста. Торжество Православия	1762 (church-wide); 1643 (local)	
4		Venerable John the Long-suffering of the Caves (☦ around 1160) Преподобный Иоанн Многострадальный, Киево-Печерский	Monk of the Caves; fought against his fleshly passions most of his life, once during Great Lent grabbed himself shoulder-long into the soil	18 July; 31 July; 8th Week after Pentecost; Седмица 8-я по Пятидесятнице	1762 (church-wide); 1643 (local)	
6		Enlightener Arcadius, bishop of Novgorod (☦ 1168) Святитель Аркадий, епископ Новгородский	Last episcope of Novgorod; enlightened deceitful people in difficult times; prevented feuds	18 September; 1 October; 17th Week after Pentecost; Седмица 17-я по Пятидесятнице	1981 (church-wide) (1439) (local)	
6		Right-Believing Grand Prince Rostislav I of Kiev and Smolensk, baptized Michael (☦ 1168) Благоверный великий князь Ростислав (во святом крещении Михаил) Киевский и Смоленский	Prince of Smolensk, Prince of Novgorod, Grand Prince of Kiev; known for his benevolence and unselfishness	14 March; 27 March; 4th Week of the Great Lent; Седмица 4-я Великого поста	1984 (church-wide)	
4		Venerable Arethas of the Caves (☦ 1170) Преподобный Арефа Печерский	Hermit; became benevolent after his greed	24 October; 6 November; 22nd Week after Pentecost; Седмица 22-я по Пятидесятнице	1762 (church-wide); 1643 (local)	
3		Right-Believing prince Gleb of Vladimir (☦ 1173) Святой благоверный Глеб, князь Владимирский	Prince of Vladimir, son of Andrey Bogolyubsky	20 June; 3 July; 4th Week after Pentecost; Седмица 4-я по Пятидесятнице	1702 (church-wide)	
6		Venerable Euphrosyne, Abbess of Polotsk (☦ 1173) Преподобная Евфросиния, игуменья Полоцкая	At age twelve Predslava took monastic vows and became henochness; opened the Saviour-Euphrosyne Nunnery; owner of the Cross of Saint Euphrosyne; became known both throughout Russia and outside, once Byzantine king Manuel I Komnenos presented her the Icon of the Mother of God of Chersonesus, one of three written by Luke	23 May; 5 June; 7th Week after Pascha; Седмица 7-я по Пасхе	1984 (church-wide)	
3		Right-Believing Grand Prince Andrey Bogolyubsky of Vladimir (☦ 1174) Благоверный Великий князь Андрей Боголюбский	Prince of several principalities and Grand Prince of Vladimir; known for his piety	4 July; 17 July; 6th Week after Pentecost; Седмица 6-я по Пятидесятнице	1702 (local)	
4		Venerable Athanasius the Hermit of the Caves (☦ 1176) Преподобный Афанасий, Затворник Печерский	Henoch, then hermit of the Caves	2 December; 15 December; 28th Week after Pentecost; Седмица 28-я по Пятидесятнице	1762 (church-wide); 1643 (local)	
3		Venerable Herasmus of Vologda (☦ 1178) Преподобный Герасим Вологодский	Monk, then presbyter; established the Holy Trinity Monastery in the future city of Vologda, which, according to a legend, was founded by Herasmus	4 March; 17 March; 3rd Week of the Great Lent; Седмица 3-я Великого поста	after 1691	
1		Right-Believing Prince Mstislav Rostislavich the Brave of Novgorod and Smolensk, baptized Georgy (☦ 1180) Благоверный князь Мстислав, во святом крещении Георгий, Храбрый, Новгородский и Смоленский	Prince of Belgorod, Novgorod and Smolensk; known for his devoutness and benevolence, well-doer and enlightener	14 June; 27 June; 3rd Week after Pentecost; Седмица 3-я по Пятидесятнице	1549 (church-wide) (after 1439) (local)	
1		Enlightener Cyril, bishop of Turov (☦ 1183) Святитель Кирилл, Епископ Туровский	5th episcope of Turov, in the last years henoch; one of the first and finest theologians and writers of the Rus', "the Russian Chrysostom"	28 April; 11 May; 4th Week after Paschа; Седмица 4-я по Пасхе, о расслабленом	2nd half of 13th century – 14th century	
4		Venerable Polycarp of the Caves (☦ 1184) Преподобный Поликарп, Архимандрит Печерский	Archimandrit of the Caves; spiritual adviser of Prince Rostislav Mstislavich	24 July; 6 August; 9th Week after Pentecost; Седмица 9-я по Пятидесятнице	1762 (church-wide); 1643 (local)	
2		Enlightener John of Novgorod (☦ 1186) Святитель Иоанн, архиепископ Новгородский	Eliah, then John as schema-archbishop of Novgorod; opened seven churches; was meek and affectionate	7 September; 20 September; 15th Week after Pentecost. Sunday before Exaltation of the Cross; Седмица 15-я по Пятидесятнице. Суббота перед Воздвижением	1547 (church-wide); 1439 (local)	
4		Venerable Ilia Muromets of the Caves (☦ 1188) Преподобный Илия Муромец, Печерский	Henoch; travellers seeing his relics spotted on his left hand a wound perforated by a spear, and on his right hand a Sign of the Cross; thought to have been the bylina hero Ilya Muromets	19 December; 1 January; 30th Week after Pentecost; Седмица 30-я по Пятидесятнице	1762 (church-wide); 1643 (local)	
4		Venerable Titus of the Caves (☦ 1190) Преподобный Тит, пресвитер Печерский	Presbyter of the Caves	27 February; 12 March; 2nd Week of the Great Lent; Седмица 2-я Великого поста	1762 (church-wide); 1643 (local)	
1		Venerable Barlaam of Khutyn (☦ 1192) Преподобный Варлаам Хутынский	Hegumen; founded the Khutyn Monastery; known for his clairvoyance and wondermaking	6 November; 19 November; 24th Week after Pentecost; Седмица 24-я по Пятидесятнице	(1461) (church-wide) late 13th century – 1st 1/2 of the 14th century (local)	
4		Enlightener Laurentius, hermit of the Caves, bishop of Turov (☦ 1194) Святитель Лаврентий, затворник Печерский, епископ Туровский	Henoch of the Caves, then hermit and episcope of Turov	29 January; 11 February; Fast-free week Седмица сплошная	1762 (church-wide); 1643 (local)	
7		Enlightener Sabbas, archbishop of Surozh (early 12th century) Святитель Савва, Архиепископ Сурожский	Archbishop of Surozh	2 April; 12 April; Holy Week; Страстная седмица	1988 (church-wide)	
4		Venerable Gregory the Icon Painter, wonderworker of the Caves (11th–12th century) Преподобный Григорий иконописец, чудотворец Печерский, Сподвижник Преподобного Алипия	Henoch; icon painter of Caves; companion of Alypius of the Caves; wondermaker	8 August; 21 August; 11th Week after Pentecost; Седмица 11-я по Пятидесятнице	1762 (church-wide); 1643 (local)	
6		Venerable Alfanov brothers: Clement, Cyrill, Nicephorus, Nicetas and Isaac (11th–12th century) Преподобные братья Алфановы: Климент, Кирилл, Никифор, Никита И Исаакии	Posadniks, builders and ktitors of the Sokolnitsky Monastery in Novgorod	4 May; 17 May; 4th Week after Pascha; Седмица 4-я по Пасхе	1981 (church-wide)	
4		Venerable Nikon the Dry of the Caves (12th century) Преподобный Никон Сухий (Сухой), Печерский	Henoch; captured by Cumans with Eustratius of the Caves; nicknamed 'Dry', because of the effect immense blood loss due to torture cause on his body	11 December; 24 December; 29th Week after Pentecost; Седмица 29-я по Пятидесятнице	1762 (church-wide); 1643 (local)	
4		Venerable Sylvester of the Caves (12th century) Преподобный Сильвестр Печерский	Monk; resumed work on the Nestor Chronicle	2 January; 15 January; 30th Week after Pentecost; Седмица 30-я по Пятидесятнице	1762 (church-wide); 1643 (local)	
4		Venerable Macarius of the Caves (12th century) Преподобный Макарий Печерский	Faster; monk of the Caves	19 January; 1 February; 32nd Week after Pentecost; Седмица 32-я по Пятидесятнице	1762 (church-wide); 1643 (local)	
4		Venerable, wonderworker Sabbas of the Caves (12th century) Преподобный Савва Печерский	Monk of the Caves	24 April; 7 May; 3rd Week after Pascha; Седмица 3-я по Пасхе	1762 (church-wide); 1643 (local)	
4		Venerable Onesimus of the Caves (12th century) Преподобный Онисим, Затворник Печерский	Hermit of the Caves	21 July; 3 August; 8th Week after Pentecost; Седмица 8-я по Пятидесятнице	1762 (church-wide); 1643 (local)	
4		Venerable Anastasius of the Caves (12th century) Преподобный Анастасий Печерский	Deacon; monkmartyr of the Caves	22 January; 4 February	1762 (church-wide); 1643 (local)	
4		Venerable Spyridon, Nicodemus and Anatolius of the Caves (12th century) Преподобные Спиридон и Никодим, Просфорники, и преподобный Анатолий Печерские	Monks; host-givers (a type of minister); wondermakers	31 October; 13 November; 23rd Week after Pentecost; Седмица 23-я по Пятидесятнице	1762 (church-wide); 1643 (local)	
4		Venerable Theophanes, faster of the Caves (12th century) Преподобный Феофан, постник Печерский	Faster; monk of the Caves	11 October; 24 October; 20th Week after Pentecost; Седмица 20-я по Пятидесятнице	1762 (church-wide); 1643 (local)	
4		Venerable Onuphrius the Quiet of the Caves (12th century) Преподобный Онуфрий (Молчаливый) Печерский	Starets; wondermaker; known for his quietness	21 July; 3 August; 8th Week after Pentecost; Седмица 8-я по Пятидесятнице	1762 (church-wide); 1643 (local)	
6		Enlightener John, episcope of Rostov (☦ 1213) Святитель Иоанн, епископ Ростовский	Consecrated the Dormition Cathedral in Vladimir	17 January; 30 January; 32nd Week after Pentecost; Седмица 32-я по Пятидесятнице	1982 (church-wide)	
2		Venerable Abraham of Smolensk (☦ 1221) Преподобный Авраамий Смоленский	Monk and icon-painter; justified by a miracle and acquitted against the charges leveled against him	21 August; 3 September; 13th Week after Pentecost; Седмица 13-я по Пятидесятнице	1549 (church-wide); 1st half of the 16th century (local)	
6		Venerable Anthony of Dymskoye (☦ 1224) Преподобный Антоний Дымский	Henoch of the Khutynsk Monastery, pupil of Barlaam; refused his succession and founded the Dymsky Monastery	24 June; 7 July; 5th Week after Pentecost; Седмица 5-я по Пятидесятнице	1981 (church-wide)	
6		Enlightener Simon, bishop of Vladimir and Suzdal (☦ 1226) Святитель Симон, епископ Владимирский и Суздальский	Episcope of Vladimir and Suzdal, monk of the Caves, then hegumen and episcope of the Nativity Monastery of Vladimir; chronicler, author of the Kiev Caves Lavra Patericon	10 May; 23 May; 5th Week after Pascha; Седмица 5-я по Пасхе	1982 (church-wide)	
3		Right-Believing Prince Peter and Princess Fevronia of Murom (☦ 1228) Благоверные князь Петр, в иночестве Давид, и княгиня Феврония, в иночестве Евфросиния, Муромские чудотворцы	Prince and Princess of Murom, tonsured David and Euphrosynia; saintly married couple, an ideal of the family love and fidelity; wondermakers	25 June; 8 July; 5th Week after Pentecost; Седмица 5-я по Пятидесятнице	(1553) (church-wide); 1st half of the 16th century (local)	
1		Martyr Abraham of Bulgaria (☦ 1229) Мученик Авраамий Болгарский	Muslim-born convert from Volga Bulgaria, killed for his conversion; martyr	1 April; 14 April; Holy Week; Страстная седмица	1549 (church-wide); 1230 (local)	
4		Right-Believing Prince Fyodor Yaroslavich of Novgorod (☦ 1233) Благоверный князь Феодор Новгородский	Prince of Novgorod	5 June; 18 June; 2nd Week after Pentecost; Седмица 2-я по Пятидесятнице	Sinodal-period (church-wide); 1614 (local)	
2		Venerable Ephraim of Smolensk (☦ 1238) Преподобный Ефрем Смоленский	Pupil of Abraham; known for his meekness and Christian love	21 August; 3 September; 13th Week after Pentecost; Седмица 13-я по Пятидесятнице	1549 (church-wide)	
3		Martyr Mercury of Smolensk (☦ 1238) Мученик Меркурий Смоленский	Soldier; the Mother of God appeared to him during prayer and ordered him to free his people from Batu's raiders; behead by Tatars	24 November; 7 December; 26th Week after Pentecost; Седмица 26-я по Пятидесятнице	early 17th century (local)	
		Right-Believing martyr Prince Basil (Vasilko) Konstantinovich of Rostov (☦ 1238) Благоверный князь мученик Василий (Василько) Ростовский	Prince of Rostov who during Battle of the Sit River refused to convert to his enemies' religion	4 March; 17 March; 3rd Week of the Great Lent; Седмица 3-я Великого поста	until 1st half of the 17th century (local)	
3		Right-Believing martyr Grand Prince George (Yuri) Vsevolodovich of Vladimir (☦ 1238) Благоверный Великий князь Георгий (Юрий) Всеволодович Владимирский	Prince of Vladimir, who during Battle of the Sit River was martyred by Tartar Mongols	4 February; 17 February	(1643) (church-wide)	
5		Right-Believing martyr Princess Eupraxia of Pskov (☦ 1243) Благоверная княгиня мученица Евпраксия Псковская	Princess; founded the John the Baptist Monastery and became first hegumeness; killed by her stepson; a wonder happened when from an icon above her grave scattered myron	16 October; 29 October; 21st Week after Pentecost; Седмица 21-я по Пятидесятнице	1734 (church-wide) c. 1859 (local)	
6		Blessed Grand Princess Theodosia (☦ 1244) Блаженная Великая княгиня Феодосия	Princess, daughter of Mstislav the Brave, Mother of Alexander Nevsky	5 May; 18 May; 5th Week after Pascha, the Sunday of the Samaritan Woman; Седмица 5-я по Пасхе, о самаряныне	1981 (church-wide)	
1		Martyrs and confessors, Right-Believing Prince Michael and his boyar Theodore, of Chernigov (☦ 1246) Мученики и исповедники: благоверный князь Михаил и болярин его Феодор, Черниговские чудотворцы	Prince of Chernigov killed by Mongol-Tatars for his adherence to the Christian faith; the same destiny faced his boyar Theodore; wondermakers	20 September; 3 October; 17th Week after Pentecost; Седмица 17-я по Пятидесятнице	before the 1270s (church-wide); 1246 (local)	
6		Monkmartyr Eliseus of Lavrishevo (around died 1250) Преподобномученик Елисей Лавришевский	Prince Rimund of Litovsk, baptized Lavr, or Lavrentius, then monk after persecutions by his blood-and-guts pagan father, king Traidenis; founded the Lavrishevsk Monastery	23 October; 5 November; 22nd Week after Pentecost; Седмица 22-я по Пятидесятнице	1984 (church-wide); 1514 (local)	
1		Venerable Euphrosyne of Suzdal (☦ 1250) Преподобная Евфросиния Суздальская	Theoduliya was Princess of Chernigov, elder daughter of Miсhael Vsevolodovich; after tonsure took the name Euphrosynia, then hegumeness of the Intercession Monastery, which soon became the leading nunnery in Russia	25 September; 8 October; 18th Week after Pentecost; Седмица 18-я по Пятидесятнице	1st half of the 16th century or (1572–81)	
6		Right-Believing Prince Svyatoslav of Yuryev, baptized Gavriil, and his son Dimitry (☦ 1253) Благоверный князь Святослав, во святом крещении Гавриил, Юрьевский и сын его Димитрий	Svyatoslav Vsevolodovich, Grand Prince of Vladimir, Prince of other principalities, son of Vsevolod Yuryevich	3 February; 16 February; Sunday of the Prodigal Son; Седмица о блудном сыне	1982 (church-wide)	
6		Venerable Xenophon of Robeika (☦ 1262) Преподобный Ксенофонт Робейский	Henoch of the Khutyn Monastery, founded by Barlaam; after his death and refused succession after Anthony became third hegumen, then founded the Robeika Monastery	28 June; 11 July; 5th Week after Pentecost; Седмица 5-я по Пятидесятнице	1981 (church-wide)	
2		Right-Believing Grand Prince Alexander Nevsky (☦ 1263) Благоверный Великий Князь Александр Невский	Prince of Novgorod and Grand Prince of Vladimir; military hero famous for the Battle of Neva and the Battle of the Ice; patron saint; known for his resistance against the Catholic West; the unification with Mongol-Tatars froze war conflicts and Russia was able to build a world power after the step by step conquers; shortly before his death took monastic vows as Aleksy; Metropolitan Cyril III after the service saw his soul being carried by an angel	23 November; 6 December; 26th Week after Pentecost; Седмица 26-я по Пятидесятнице	1547 (church-wide); 1380 (local)	
4		Right-Believing martyr Prince Roman Olgovich of Ryazan (☦ 1270) Мученик Благоверный Князь Роман (Ольгович) Рязанский	Prince of Ryazan; tortured by Muslim Mongols after he refused to convert from his "pagan" belief to Islam, Muslims cut out his tongue and slowly other parts, then skinned his head and stuck it on a spear	19 July; 1 August; 8th Week after Pentecost; Седмица 8-я по Пятидесятнице	1861 (local)	
6		Enlightener Serapion, bishop of Vladimir (☦ 1275) Святитель Серапион, епископ Владимирский	Preacher and writer of the Caves; then episcope of Vladimir; fought against pagan superstition; foresaw the Wrath of God	12 July; 25 July; 7th Week after Pentecost; Седмица 7-я по Пятидесятнице	1982 (church-wide)	
4		Venerable Cyprian of Ustyug (☦ 1276) Преподобный Киприан Устюжский	Landowner before tonsure to monkhood; founded the Archangel Michael Monastery	29 September; 12 October; 18th Week after Pentecost; Седмица 18-я по Пятидесятнице	1841	
6		Venerable Princess Charitina of Novgorod (Litovsk) (☦ 1281) Преподобная Харитина Новгородская (Литовская)	Princess of Litovsk; then nun at the Saint Peter and Paul Nunnery in Novgorod	5 October; 18 October; 19th Week after Pentecost; Седмица 19-я по Пятидесятнице	1981 (church-wide)	
3		Right-Believing Prince Roman of Uglich (☦ 1285) Благоверный князь Роман Угличский	Prince of Uglich; benevolent, built towns, churches, hospitals and hospices	3 February; 16 February; Sunday of the Prodigal Son; Седмица о блудном сыне	1595 or 1605 (local)	
1		Enlightener Ignatius, bishop of Rostov (☦ 1288) Святитель Игнатий, епископ Ростовский	In his early years became henoch, then episcope of Rostov; founded the Trinity Monastery in Beloozero and the Boris and Gleb Church in Rostov; enlightened pagan Finnish tribes; conciliated princes	28 May; 10 June; 1st Week after Pentecost, fast-free week Седмица 1-я по Пятидесятнице, сплошная	1474 (church-wide) (from the 14th century) (local)	
6		Enlightener Simeon of Polotsk and Tver (☦ 1289) Святитель Симеон, епископ Полоцкий, епископ Тверской	Episcope of Polotsk, then Tver; brother of Alexander Nevsky; buried Yaroslav of Tver; restored churches	3 February; 16 February; Sunday of the Prodigal Son; Седмица о блудном сыне	1979 (church-wide); 1904 (local)	
3		Venerable tsarevich Peter of the Horde (☦ 1290) Преподобный Петр, Царевич Ордынский	Tsarevich, nephew of the khan Berke; once Apostles Peter and Paul appeared in front of him and gave him building material for a new monastery	29 June; 12 July; 5th Week after Pentecost; Седмица 5-я по Пятидесятнице	(1553) (church-wide)	
3		Enlightener Basil of Ryazan (☦ 1295) Святитель Василий, епископ Рязанский	As episcope of Murom he helped people, but after calumny he had to fly to Ryazan, which he arrived by swimming the Oka on his cloak and using his rod as a paddle	3 July; 16 July; 6th Week after Pentecost; Седмица 6-я по Пятидесятнице	1609 (local)	
6		Venerable Joasaph of Snetogorsk and Basil of Mirozha, of Pskov (☦ 1299) Память Псковских угодников: преподобных Иоасафа Снетогорского и Василия Мирожского и дружины их	Hegumens who together with 27 henochs, women and children died by fire in the two monasteries, which were set on fire by Germans as a revenge of the unsuccessful raid on Pskov	4 March; 17 March; 3rd Week of the Great Lent; Седмица 3-я Великого поста	1987 (church-wide)	
1		Right-Believing Princes Theodore (☦ 1299) and his sons David (☦ 1321) and Constantine (14th century) of Yaroslav Благоверные князья Феодор и чада его Давид и Константин, Ярославские чудотворцы	Prince Theodore Rostislavich the Black of Yaroslav, Mozhaisk and Smolensk was given the poor town Mozhaisk, which he significantly restored; at the time he fought alongside the Khan Mengu-Timur; opened churches on the 36 towns presented by the Khan, after the death of his elder son, Mikhail, Theodore returned to Yaroslav and built churches there, for a time ruled over Smolensk; at the end of his life was monk, and deeply repented his alliance with Mongol invaders Constantine and David were sons of Theodore and Anna, daughter of the Khan who became his wife after the death of Thedore's previous one; wondermakers	19 September; 2 October; 17th Week after Pentecost; Седмица 17-я по Пятидесятнице	1467 (church-wide or local)	
1		Right-Believing Prince Daumantas of Pskov, baptized Timothy (☦ 1299) Благоверный князь Довмонт, во святом крещении Тимофей, Псковский	Prince of Pskov who made the city independent from Novgorod Republic, defender of Russia from the Livonian Order	20 May; 2 June; 7th Week after Pascha; Седмица 7-я по Пасхе	1549 (church-wide); 1374 (local)	
4		Venerable Abraham the Laborious of the Caves (12th – 13th centuries) Преподобный Авраамий Трудолюбивый, Печерский	Henoch of the Caves	21 August; 3 September; 13th Week after Pentecost; Седмица 13-я по Пятидесятнице	1762 (church-wide); 1643 (local)	
7		Right-Believing Prince Oleg Romanovich of Bryansk (13th century) Благоверный князь Олег Брянский	Prince of Bryansk; then founded the Peter and Paul Monastery there and became henoch	20 September; 3 October; 17th Week after Pentecost; Седмица 17-я по Пятидесятнице	2003 (church-wide)	
3		Right-Believing Prince Vladimir and Princess Agrippina of Rzhev (13th century) Благоверный князь Владимир и благоверная княгиня Агриппина, Ржевские чудотворцы	Wondermakers	15 July; 28 July; 8th Week after Pentecost; Седмица 8-я по Пятидесятнице	late 17th century (local)	
4		Venerable Luke the Economist of the Caves (13th century) Преподобный Лука, Эконом Печерский	Economist of the Caves	6 November; 19 November; 24th Week after Pentecost; Седмица 24-я по Пятидесятнице	1762 (church-wide); 1643 (local)	
6		Venerable Constantine and Kosma of Kosin (of Staraya Russa) (13th century) Преподобные Константин и Косма Косинские, Старорусские	Founded the Kosin Monastery	29 July; 11 August; 10th Week after Pentecost; Седмица 10-я по Пятидесятнице	1981 (church-wide)	
4		Venerable Mardarius the Hermit of the Caves (13th century) Преподобный Мардарий, затворник Печерский	Hermit of the Caves	13 December; 26 December; 29th Week after Pentecost; Седмица 29-я по Пятидесятнице	1762 (church-wide); 1643 (local)	
4		Venerable Zacharia the Faster of the Caves (13th – 14th centuries) Преподобный Захария Постник, Печерский	Monk of the Caves	24 March; 6 April; 5th Week of the Great Lent; Седмица 5-я Великого поста	1762 (church-wide); 1643 (local)	
6		Venerable Simon of Radonezh (14th century) Преподобный Симон Радонежский	Student of Sergius of Radonezh; helped to build the Life-giving Trinity church and kellions	10 May; 23 May; 5th Week after Pascha; Седмица 5-я по Пасхе	1981 (church-wide)	
4		Venerable Titus of the Caves (14th century) Преподобный Тит Печерский, бывший воин	Former soldier; after heavy head injury became henoch of the Caves	27 February; 12 March; 2nd Week of the Great Lent; Седмица 2-я Великого поста	1762 (church-wide); 1643 (local)	
5		Venerable Athanasius and Theodosius of Cherepovets (14th century) Преподобные Афанасий и Феодосий Череповецкие	Athanasius "The Iron Staff" and Theodosius were students of Sergius of Radonezh; settled at the edge of Novgorod, in Cherepovets, where they built the Holy Trinity church and founded the Resurrection Monastery	25 September; 8 October; 18th Week after Pentecost; Седмица 18-я по Пятидесятнице	1841 (local)	
6		Venerable Maсarius of the Pisma (14th century) Преподобный Макарий Писемский	Student of Sergius; became hermit and cloistered himself on the River Pisma; met and became pupil of Pavel Obnorsky; founded a monastery	10 January; 23 January; 31st Week after Pentecost; Седмица 31-я по Пятидесятнице	1981 (church-wide)	
		Venerable Barlaam and Gedeon of Serpukhov (14th century) Преподобные Варлаам и Гедеон Серпуховские	Barlaam was cell-attendant of Metropolitan Aleksy, founded the Vladychny Monastery of Serpukhov; Gedeon was brother of Barlaam	5 May; 18 May; 5th Week after Pascha, the Sunday of the Samaritan Woman; Седмица 5-я по Пасхе, о самаряныне	late 17th – 18th century (local)	
6		Venerable Martha of Pskov (☦ 1300) Преподобная Марфа Псковская	Maria Dmitrievna of Pskov, granddaughter of Alexander Nevsky and daughter of his son Dmitri Aleksandrovich, wife of Daumantas; shortly before her death took the monastic vows at the John the Baptist Nunnery	8 November; 21 November; 24th Week after Pentecost; Седмица 24-я по Пятидесятнице	1987 (church-wide)	
4		Right-Believing Prince Daniel of Moscow (☦ 1303) Благоверный князь Даниил Московский	The first Prince of Moscow; founder of the first Moscow monasteries (Epiphany Monastery and Danilov Monastery)	4 March; 17 March; 3rd Week of the Great Lent; Седмица 3-я Великого поста	18th–19th century (local)	
2		Righteous Procopius of Ustyug (☦ 1303) Праведный Прокопий, Христа ради юродивый, Устюжский чудотворец	Former Catholic merchant converted to Orthodoxy; prophesied the impact of the Veliky Ustyug meteorite; wondermaker	8 July; 21 July; 7th Week after Pentecost; Седмица 7-я по Пятидесятнице	1547 (local)	
6		Enlightener Metropolitan Maximus of Kiev and Vladimir (☦ 1305) Святитель Максим, митрополит Киевский и Владимирский	10th episcope of Vladimir, 27th Metropolitan of Kiev (Moscow cathedra), Metropolitan of all Rus Maximus ruled in a time when weak Byzantine Emperor Michael VIII established a uniate with the Catholics, resulting to conflicts and persecutions of Orthodox; after the death of predecessor Kirill III the residence was moved from Kiev to Vladimir (Suzdal), that town became subsequently capital of Russia	6 December; 19 December; 28th Week after Pentecost; Седмица 28-я по Пятидесятнице	1981 (church-wide)	
4		Enlightener Theoctistus, archbishop of Novgorod and Pskov (☦ 1310) Святитель Феоктист, архиепископ Новгородский и Псковский	10th archbishop of Novgorod and Pskov; in late years hermit at the Annunciation Monastery	23 December; 5 January; 31st Week after Pentecost; Седмица 31-я по Пятидесятнице	(1786) (local)	
2		Right-Believing martyr Prince Michael of Tver (☦ 1318) Мученик Благоверный Князь Михаил Тверской	Grand Prince of Vladimir and Prince of Tver; killed by Mongol-Tatars	22 November; 5 December; 26th Week after Pentecost; Седмица 26-я по Пятидесятнице	1549 (church-wide) (1318) (local)	
1		Enlightener Metropolitan Peter of Moscow (☦ 1326) Святитель Петр, митрополит Московский и всея России, чудотворец	11th episcope of Vladimir, 28th Metropolitan of Kiev (Moscow cathedra), Metropolitan of all Rus; stern and talented orator who achieved some privileges for the clergy by the Horde; foresaw the rise of Moscow under Ivan I Kalita; wanted to move the cathedra to Moscow, and so the Dormition Metropolitan Cathedral was built there; wondermaker	21 December; 3 January; 30th Week after Pentecost. Sunday before Christmas; Седмица 30-я по Пятидесятнице. Суббота перед Рождеством Христовым	1339 (church-wide)	
6		Right-Believing martyr Prince Theodore of Starodub (☦ 1330) Святой благоверный князь Феодор Стародубский	Prince of Starodub; brutally martyred by Tatars	21 June; 4 July; 4th Week after Pentecost; Седмица 4-я по Пятидесятнице	1982 (church-wide)	
7		Venerable Cyrill and Maria, parents of ven. Sergius of Radonezh (☦ around 1337) Преподобные схимонах Кирилл и схимонахиня Мария, родители Преподобного Сергия Радонежского	Schema-monks and parents of Sergius of Radonezh	28 September; 11 October; 18th Week after Pentecost; Седмица 18-я по Пятидесятнице	1989	
3		Venerable Anna of Kashin (☦ around 1337) Преподобная Анна Кашинская	Princess of Tver, her ancestors include the martyrs Mikhail of Chernigov and Vasilko of Rostov, wife of Michael of Tver; was twice canonized as a holy protectress of women who suffer the loss of relatives, having lost almost all her relatives due to wars with the Golden Horde	2 October; 15 October; 19th Week after Pentecost; Седмица 19-я по Пятидесятнице	1650 (church-wide); 1677 (decanon.) (Note: From 12–21 February 1677 Patriarch Joachim ordered to investigate the sainthood of Anna of Kashin, particularly the fact of healing from her relics; her following de-canonization was supported by the 1678–1679 Councils, but services were allowed. Thirteen errors were found in documents like her Lives of Saints, including her supposed ancestry from "glorious boyars". However, local honourings of Anna of Kashin did not stop, and several healings were recorded.); 1908 (recanon.) (Note: On 7 November 1908, the Most Holy Synod recovered her church-wide canonization.)	
2		Martyrs Anthony, John, and Eustathius of Lithuania (Vilnius) (☦ 1347) Святые мученики Литовские (Виленские) Антоний, Иоанн и Евстафий	Boyars executed by pagan Lithuanian Grand Duke Algirdas	14 April; 27 April; 2nd Week after Pascha (Antipascha); Седмица 2-я по Пасхе (Антипасха)	1549 (church-wide); 1364 (local)	
6		Venerable Sergius and Herman of Valaam (☦ around 1353) Преподобные Сергий и Герман, Валаамские Чудотворцы	Monks who brought Christianity to Karelians and Finns; founders of the Valaam Monastery; wondermakers	28 June; 11 July; 5th Week after Pentecost; Седмица 5-я по Пятидесятнице	1981 (church-wide)	
4		Enlightener Metropolitan Theognostus of Kiev and Vladimir (☦ 1353) Святитель Феогност, митрополит Киевский и Владимирский	29th Metropolitan of Kiev (Moscow cathedra), Metropolitan of all Rus	14 March; 27 March; 4th Week of the Great Lent; Седмица 4-я Великого поста	after 1805 (local)	
3		Enlightener Moses of Novgorod (☦ 1362) Святитель Моисей, архиепископ Новгородский	12th archbishop of Novgorod, at early age escaped from home and took the monastic vows at the Adolescent Monastery of Tver; after recommendation of his parents moved to Yuriev Monastery of Novgorod; ruled in a difficult period of black plague, Mongol terror and robberies; made benevolencies, founded churches and monasteries, rewrote liturgical books, fought against the heresy strigolniki, enlightened pagan Novgorodians; Patriarch Philotheus I of Constantinople once presented him a cross robe which only he and his exarchates wore, and Byzantine Emperor John VI Kantakouzenos an ecclesiastical letter missive; cloistered himself at the Resurrection Wooden Monastery, but then had to return; in late years retired at the Nikolo-Skovorodian Monastery	25 January; 7 February	until 2nd half of the 17th century (local)	
6		Venerable Cyrill the Czech (of Chelmogorsk) (☦ 1368) Преподобный Кирилл Чешский (Челмогорский)	At an early age went to the Antoniev Monastery in Novgorod; then settled into a cave in Kargopol, built a chapel and kellion (chapel cell); preached Christianity to the Chuds, built for them the Epiphany Church and for the henochs a monastery	8 December; 21 December; 28th Week after Pentecost; Седмица 28-я по Пятидесятнице	1981 (church-wide)	
		Enlightener John of Suzdal (☦ 1373) Святитель Иоанн, епископ Суздальский	2nd episcope of Suzdal; benevolent, built a hospital, enlightened pagan Mordvins	15 October; 28 October; 21st Week after Pentecost; Седмица 21-я по Пятидесятнице	mid-16th century (local)	
3		Venerable Abraham of Galich and Chukhloma (☦ 1375) Преподобный Авраамий Галичский, или Чухломский	Student of Sergius; known for his meekness; after becoming hieromonk moved to Kostroma, at the border of the towns Galich and Chukhloma, and opened some monasteries; enlightened baptized, but amoral and superstitious, people; built a kellion after hearing a voice which gave him the Mother of God icon of Galich; founded a skete and then the Dormition Monastery; after rising community, built the Deposition of the Virgin's Girdle Church; founded another two cloisters after searching for a better place to live reclusively, the Synaxis Monastery and the Intercession Monastery	20 July; 2 August; 8th Week after Pentecost; Седмица 8-я по Пятидесятнице	(1553), 1621 (church-wide)	
1		Enlightener Metropolitan Alexius (☦ 1378) Святитель Алексий, митрополит Московский и всея России, чудотворец	4th episcope of Suzdal, 30th Metropolitan of Kiev (Moscow cathedra), Metropolitan of all Rus; boyar Fyodor Byakont after a dream was tonsured at the Epiphany Monastery in Moscow, met there Stephen, elder brother of Sergius of Radonezh; regent during Prince Dmitry Donskoy's minority; spiritual tutor of Dmitry Donskoy and Vladimir the Bold; saved the country from a Tatar raid by miraculous curing of Taydulla, wife of Khan Jani Beg of the Golden Horde; wondermaker	12 February; 25 February; Cheese-fare Week; Седмица cырная (масленица) – сплошная	late Dec. 1448 (church-wide) (1431) (local)	
6		Venerable Theodoria of Nizhny Novgorod (☦ 1378) Преподобная Феодора, в миру Анастасия (Васса), Нижегородская	Anastasia (Vassa), daughter of a Tverian boyar; since her early years wished to become a nun, so after the death of her rich husband freed serfs, gave her property to the church and the poor, and took the vows at a nunnery in Galich	16 April; 29 April; 2nd Week after Pascha. Day of Rejoicing. Commemoration of the Departed; Седмица 2-я по Пасхе. Радоница. Поминовение усопших	1982 (church-wide)	
3		Venerable Silvester of the Obnora (☦ 1379) Преподобный Сильвестр Обнорский	Student of Sergius of Radonezh; recluse on the banks of the Obnora River to whom people came after a visit of a man; moved to Moscow and was given antimension and blessing for the future monastery and church	25 April; 8 May; 3rd Week after Pascha; Седмица 3-я по Пасхе	until 2nd half of the 16th century (local)	
6		Venerable Pachomius of Nerekhta (☦ 1384) Преподобный Пахомий Нерехтский	Jakob Ignatyev took the monastic vows at the Nativity Monastery; became hegumen as Pachomius at the restored Tsar Konstantin Monastery outside Vladimir; then founded a new monastery in Nerekhta, near Kostroma; once during blessing of the water cured a man suffering drinking bout; several wonders happened after his death	15 May; 28 May; 6th Week after Pascha; Седмица 6-я по Пасхе	1981 (church-wide)	
3		Enlightener Metropolitan Dionysius I (☦ 1385) Святитель Дионисии, архиепископ Суздальский	Archbishop of Suzdal, 34th Metropolitan of Kiev (Moscow cathedra), Metropolitan of all Rus; in his early years lived in a cave at a high coast of the River Wolga, outside Nizhny Novgorod; later founded the Ascension Monastery; fought against the heretic sect Strigolniki and defeated it in Pskov with the power of his words; after his return from Constantinople was detained by Vladimir Olgerdovich in Kiev, where he died	26 June; 9 July; 5th Week after Pentecost; Седмица 5-я по Пятидесятнице	1621 (church-wide)	
6		Venerable Micah of Radonezh (☦ 1385) Преподобный Михей Радонежский	One of the first teachers and cell-attendants of Sergius of Radonezh; known for his meekness	9 May; 22 May; 5th Week after Pascha; Седмица 5-я по Пасхе	1981 (church-wide)	
7		Right-Believing Grand Prince Dmitry Donskoy (☦ 1389) Благоверный Великий Князь Димитрий Донской	Prince of Moscow, Grand Prince of Vladimir; war hero; the first Prince of Moscow to openly challenge Mongol authority in Russia, famous for the Battle of Kulikovo	19 May; 1 June; 7th Week after Pascha, Sunday of the Holy Fathers; Седмица 7-я по Пасхе, святых отцев I Вселенского Собора	1988 (church-wide)	
3		Venerable Methodius of the Peshnosha (☦ 1392) Преподобный Мефодий, игумен Пешношский	Student of Sergius of Radonezh; cloistered himself into an oak forest, where he built a kellion on the fens, then a monastery, and became hegumen; known for his benevolence	4 June; 17 June; 2nd Week after Pentecost; Седмица 2-я по Пятидесятнице	late 17th century – early 18th century (local)	
1		Venerable Demetrius of Priluki (☦ 1392) Преподобный Димитрий Прилуцкий, Вологодский	Son of a rich merchant, tonsured in his early years at a monastery; companion of Sergius of Radonezh; founded the St. Nicholas Monastery in Pereslavl and the Spaso-Prilutsky Monastery in place Priluki (now suburb of Vologda); known for his benevolence	11 February; 24 February; Cheese-fare Week; Седмица cырная (масленица) – сплошная	late 15th century (church-wide) (from 1409) (local)	
1		Venerable Sergius of Radonezh, all of Russia wondermaker (☦ 1392) Преподобный Сергий, игумен Радонежский, всея России чудотворец	Bartholomew, son of boyars; patron saint of Russia, spiritual and monastic reformer; became hermit and built the Holy Trinity Church amidst wood in Makovets; ate only prosphora, most of it gave to bears; gradually more henochs came to him, and so the Trinity Lavra of St. Sergius was founded, the "Heart of Russia"; blessed Dmitry Donskoy for the Battle of Kulikovo; made numerous wonders; "Unifier of Russian earth"; one of the most important Russian saints, influenced the political and religious life of Russia; numerous of his later canonized students built hundreds of monasteries and churches	25 September; 8 October; 18th Week after Pentecost; Седмица 18-я по Пятидесятнице	until 1448 (church-wide) (1422) (local)	
2		Enlightener Jakob of Rostov (☦ 1392) Святитель Иаков, Епископ Ростовский	Episcope of Rostov; known for his erudition and elocution, fought against Marcian's heretic iconoclasm; saved a woman from execution, which resulted him being expelled from Rostov; swam on his mantia a river until the coasts and founded the Conception Church and the Spaso-Yakovlevsky Monastery	27 November; 10 December; 27th Week after Pentecost; Седмица 27-я по Пятидесятнице	1549 (church-wide); 1st half of the 16th century (local)	
6		Blessed Theodore of Novgorod (☦ 1392) Блаженный Феодор Новгородский, Христа ради юродивый	Son of a rich family; despite his later poverty, helped the poor and blessed his insulters; Fool for Christ	19 January; 1 February; 32nd Week after Pentecost; Седмица 32-я по Пятидесятнице	1981 (church-wide)	
6		Venerable Roman of Kirzhach (☦ 1392) Преподобный Роман Киржачский	Student of Sergius of Radonezh; founded the monastery in Kirzhach	29 July; 11 August; 10th Week after Pentecost; Седмица 10-я по Пятидесятнице	1982 (church-wide)	
3		Venerable Cassian and Gregory of Avnega (☦ 1392) Преподобные Кассиан и Григорий Авнежские	Students of Sergius of Radonezh; founded a monastery in Avnega; both were killed by Tatars and the monastery was looted and destroyed	15 June; 28 June; 3rd Week after Pentecost; Седмица 3-я по Пятидесятнице	1560-1 (church-wide)	
2		Blessed Nicholas Kochanov of Novgorod (☦ 1392) Блаженный Николай Кочанов, Христа ради юродивый, Новгородский чудотворец	Former rich person turned Fool-for-Christ, wondermaker	15 June; 28 June; 3rd Week after Pentecost; Седмица 3-я по Пятидесятнице	1549 (church-wide)	
7		Venerable Athanasius (the younger) of Vysotsky (☦ 1395) Преподобный Афанасий (младший), игумен Высоцкий	Hegumen of the Vysotsky Monastery, founded by Athanasius the older	12 September; 25 September; 16th Week after Pentecost; Седмица 16-я по Пятидесятнице	2004 (church-wide) c. 1697 (local)	
6		Venerable Andronicus of Moscow (☦ 1395/1373) Преподобный Андроник Московский	First hegumen of the Andronikov Monastery; in last years hermit	13 June; 26 June; 3rd Week after Pentecost; Седмица 3-я по Пятидесятнице	1981 (church-wide) (late 15th century) (local)	
2		Enlightener Theodore III of Rostov (☦ 1395) Святитель Феодор, архиепископ Ростовский	Archbishop of Rostov; student of Sergius of Radonezh; founder and first hegumen of the Simonov Monastery	28 November; 11 December; 27th Week after Pentecost; Седмица 27-я по Пятидесятнице	1549 (church-wide)	
2		Enlightener Stephen of Perm (☦ 1396) Святитель Стефан, Епископ Великопермский	Missionary, credited with the conversion of the Komi Permyaks to Christianity and the invention of Old Permic script	26 April; 9 May; 3rd Week after Pascha; Седмица 3-я по Пасхе	1549 (church-wide) around 1475 (local)	
3		Right-Believing Prince Andrew of Smolensk, wondermaker of Pereslavl (☦ 1398) Святой Благоверный князь Андрей Смоленский, Переяславский чудотворец	Prince of Smolensk; sexton of the St. Nicholas Church; made several wonders	27 October; 9 November; 22nd Week after Pentecost; Седмица 22-я по Пятидесятнице	c. 1539	
6		Venerable Lazarus and Athanasius of Murmansk (Murom) (14th – 15th centuries) Преподобные Лазарь и Афанасий Мурманские (Муромские)	Lazarus was Greek from Constantinople; student of Athanasius and archbishop Basil; came to Novgorod, after the latter's death moved to Murmansk near Lake Onega; preached Christianity to the pagan Sami; after healing a chieftain's son, people began to convert to Christianity; founded a monastery	8 March; 21 March; 3rd Week of the Great Lent; Седмица 3-я Великого поста	1974 and 1981 (church-wide)	
7		Venerable Andrei Rublev the Icon Writer (15th century) Преподобный Андрей Рублев, иконописец.	Icon writer; student of Sergius of Radonezh; wrote icons on walls of churches and cathedrals such as the Dormition Cathedral of Vladimir, the Cathedral of the Annunciation of Moscow and the Trinity Monastery; author of the Mother of God icon of Vladimir for the Dormition Cathedral in Vladimir, Trinity icon for the Trinity Monastery and The Saviour icon, among others	4 July; 17 July; 6th Week after Pentecost; Седмица 6-я по Пятидесятнице	1988 (church-wide)	
6		Blessed George of Shenkursk (15th century) Блаженный Георгий, Христа Ради Юродивый, Шенкурский Чудотворец	Fool for Christ, wondermaker of Shenkrusk by the Vaga River	26 April; 9 May; 3rd Week after Pascha; Седмица 3-я по Пасхе	1981 (church-wide)	
4		Venerable Amphilochius and Tarasios of the River Glushitsa (15th century) Преподобные Амфилохий и Тарасий Глушицкие	Henochs and hegumens; students of Dionysius; preached Christianity to the pagans of Perm	12 October; 25 October; 20th Week after Pentecost; Седмица 20-я по Пятидесятнице	(1621) (local)	
3		Venerable Jakob Bryleyevsky (15th century) Преподобный Иаков Брылеевский	Student of Jakob of the Iron Pinery, toiler and novice of the Iron Pinery Monastery; founded the Bryleyevsky Monastery	11 April; 24 April; Bright Week; Светлая седмица – сплошная	1981 (church-wide) c. 1628 (local)	
		Venerable John of Galich (15th century) Преподобный Иоанн Галичский	Hermit of the Paisiyev and Nikolayev Monastery	29 May; 11 June; 1st Week after Pentecost, fast-free week Седмица 1-я по Пятидесятнице (сплошная)	?	
6		Venerable Ignatius of Spaso-Eleasarovsky (15th century) Преподобный Игнатий, Игумен Спасо-Елеазаровский	Presbyter and first hegumen of the Spaso-Eleazarovsky Monastery	15 May; 28 May; 6th Week after Pascha; Седмица 6-я по Пасхе	1987 (church-wide)	
6		Venerable Mark, Jonah and Vassa of the Pskov Caves (15th century) Преподобные Марк, Иона и Васса Псково-Печерские	Monks of the Pskov-Caves Monastery	29 March; 11 April; 6th Week of the Great Lent (Palm Week); Седмица 6-я Великого поста (седмица ваий)	1987 and 1996 (local)	
6		Venerable Theodore and Paul of Rostov (15th century) Преподобные Феодор и Павел Ростовские	1st and 2nd hegumens of the Boris and Gleb Monastery, respectively; Theodore at late years founded the St. Nicholas Monastery	22 October; 4 November; 22nd Week after Pentecost; Седмица 22-я по Пятидесятнице	1964 (church-wide)	
4		Blessed Basilius of Vologda (of Kubenskoye) (15th century) Блаженный Василий Вологодский, Кубенский	Henoch of the Kamenny Monastery, near Lake Kubenskoye	2 August; 15 August; 10th Week after Pentecost; Седмица 10-я по Пятидесятнице	1841	
		Venerable Nicephorus of Kaluga (15th century) Преподобный Никифор Калужский	Student of Tikhon of Medyn	16 June; 29 June; 3rd Week after Pentecost; Седмица 3-я по Пятидесятнице	?	
6		Venerable Moses of Beloozero (15th century) Преподобный Моисей Белоезерский	Henoch of the Kirillo-Belozersky Monastery; fortuneteller	23 February; 8 March; 1st Week of the Great Lent; Седмица 1-я Великого поста	1981 (church-wide)	
5		Venerable Abraham and Coprius of the River Pechenga (15th century) Преподобные Авраамий и Коприй Печенгские	Henochs of the Kirillo-Belozersky Monastery	4 February; 17 February	1841 (Note: Synaxis of All Saints of Vologda) (church-wide)	
6		Venerable Cornelis and Abraham of Paleostrov (15th century) Преподобные Корнилий и Авраамий Палеостровские	Cornelis was henoch of the Valaam Monastery; preached Christianity to the pagans by the White Sea; built a church on the island Paley within Lake Onega; in late years hegumen and hermit; Abraham was his student	19 May; 1 June; 7th Week after Pascha, Sunday of the Holy Fathers; Седмица 7-я по Пасхе, святых отцев I Вселенского Собора	1974, (Note: Synaxis of All Saints of Karelia) 1981 (Note: Synaxis of All Saints of Novgorod) (local)	
4		Venerable Eleazar, Nazarius and Eumenius of Olonets (15th century) Преподобные Елеазар, Назарий и Евмений Олонецкие	Probably Greeks from Constantinople; probably students of Lazarius of Murmansk; founded the John the Baptist Monastery near Olonets	4 June; 17 June; 2nd Week after Pentecost; Седмица 2-я по Пятидесятнице	1831 (local)	
4		Venerable Barsanuphius, Sabbas, Sabbatius and Euphrosyne of Tver (15th century) Преподобные Тверские: Варсонофий, Савва, Савватий и Евфросин	Monks of the Savvin Monastery, near Tver; Euphrosyne healed Maria of Tver, wife of Grand Prince Ivan III of Moscow	2 March; 15 March; 2nd Week of the Great Lent. Commemoration of the Departed; Седмица 2-я Великого поста. Поминовение усопших	1849 (church-wide); 1778 (local) (Note: Sabbatius)	
6		Venerable Athanasius (the older) of Vysotsky (☦ around 1401) Преподобный Афанасий (Старший), Игумен Высоцкий	Son of a Novgorodian cleric; student of Sergius of Radonezh; cook of a monastery, then writer; per the recommendation of Vladimir the Brave, founded the Vysotsky Monastery and became hegumen there; when his namesake became his successor, went to the Constantinople Monastery, while resuming work and helping at the Vysotsky Monastery, such as directing henochs to that monastery	12 September; 25 September; 16th Week after Pentecost; Седмица 16-я по Пятидесятнице	1981 (church-wide)	
6		Venerable Cyriacus of Kargopol (☦ 1402) Преподобный Кириак Каргопольский	Founded the Dormition Monastery by the Olonki River in Kargopol	28 April; 11 May; 4th Week after Paschа; Седмица 4-я по Пасхе, о расслабленом	1972 (church-wide)	
2		Venerable Euthymius of Suzdal (☦ 1404) Преподобный Евфимий, архимандрит Суздальский	Ascetic; took monastic vows at the Pechersky Ascension Monastery by Dionysius, then Metropolitan of Moscow; founded the Monastery of St. Euthymius and became archimandrite there; companion of Sergius of Radonezh	1 April; 14 April; Holy Week; Страстная седмица	1549 (church-wide); 1st half of the 16th century (local)	
1		Right-Believing martyrness Juliana of Vyazma, wonderworker of Torzhok (☦ 1406) Мученица благоверная княгиня Иулиания Вяземская, Новоторжская чудотворица	Wife of Simeon, Prince of Vyazemsk; he and Juliana were murdered by Yuri, Prince of Smolensk, during a banquet; after escaping and returning, he repented for his sins; wonders happened near her grave	21 December; 3 January; 30th Week after Pentecost. Sunday before Christmas; Седмица 30-я по Пятидесятнице. Суббота перед Рождеством Христовым	1407 (local)	
1		Enlightener Metropolitan Cyprian, wondermaker of all Russia (☦ 1406) Святитель Киприан, митрополит Московский, всея России чудотворец	31st Metropolitan of Kiev (cathedra based in Moscow), Metropolitan of all Rus; united the churches of the Grand Duchy of Moscow and Grand Duchy of Lithuania for a period; when Tamerlan rode towards the River Don, Cyprian sent his clerics from Vladimir to Moscow with the Icon of the Mother of God of Vladimir, and Tamerlan capitulated; founded the Sretensky Monastery; writer of liturgical and historical books, Lives of Saints; stored canonical works	16 September; 29 September; 17th Week after Pentecost; Седмица 17-я по Пятидесятнице	1549 (church-wide); 1st half of the 16th century or after 1805 (local)	
3		Venerable Stephen of Makhra (☦ 1406) Преподобный Стефан Махрищский	Student of Sergius of Radonezh; moved for a time to Vologda and founded there a monastery, but returned; ascetic, wore rags	14 July; 27 July; Commemoration of the Holy Fathers of Seven Ecumenical Councils; Память святых отцев шести Вселенских Соборов	1525-7 (church-wide)	
2		Venerable Sabbas of Storozhi (of Zvenigorod) (☦ 1407) Преподобный Савва Сторожевский, или Звенигородский	One of the first students of Sergius of Radonezh; hegumen of the soon-to-be lavra; after persuasion of Prince Yuri of Zvenigorod moved near his town and founded the Savvino-Storozhevsky Monastery on Mount Storozhy and built a Nativity Church and a kellion; clairvoyanced a well; made several wonders	3 December; 16 December; 28th Week after Pentecost; Седмица 28-я по Пятидесятнице	1547 (church-wide)	
4		Venerable Grand Princess Euphrosyne of Moscow (☦ 1407) Преподобная Евфросиния, в миру Евдокия, Великая Княгиня Московская	Grand Princess Eudoxia of Moscow, tonsured Euphrosyne; after the death of Dmitry Donskoy built in his palace the Ascension Convent; most of her life lived a luxurious, yet ascetic double life, shortly before her death took the monastic vows	17 May; 30 May; 6th Week after Pascha; Седмица 6-я по Пасхе	c. 1869 (church-wide)	
2		Enlightener Arsenius of Tver (☦ 1409) Святитель Арсений, епископ Тверской	Episcope of Tver; born to a rich family, after their death gave the estate to the poor, freed his serfs; went to the Kiev Caves; known for his deep silence and his virtue, wondermaking, healing; became archdeacon of Metropolitan Cyprian, then episcope of Tver; founded the Zhyoltikov Monastery	2 March; 15 March; 2nd Week of the Great Lent. Commemoration of the Departed; Седмица 2-я Великого поста. Поминовение усопших	(1665) (church-wide) 1547 (local)	
6		Venerable Sabbas of Moscow (☦ 1410) Преподобный Савва Московский	Successor of Andronikos of Moscow	13 June; 26 June; 3rd Week after Pentecost; Седмица 3-я по Пятидесятнице	1981 (church-wide)	
6		Venerable Theophilos and Jakob of the River Omuchi (☦ 1412) Преподобные Феофил и Иаков Омучские	Henochs; founded the Theophilos Dormition Monastery, Theophilos was hegumen, Jakob builder	21 October; 3 November; 22nd Week after Pentecost; Седмица 22-я по Пятидесятнице	1981 (church-wide)	
3		Venerable Sergius of the River Nurma (☦ 1412) Преподобный Сергий Нуромский	Greek monk from Mount Athos moving to Russia; student of Sergius of Radonezh; founded the Nurma Monastery by the River Nurma	7 October; 20 October; 20th Week after Pentecost; Седмица 20-я по Пятидесятнице	c. 1585 (local)	
6		Enlightener Dionysius of Rostov (☦ 1425) Святитель Дионисий, архиепископ Ростовский	Slav from Mount Athos; archimandrit of the Kamenny Monastery, then archbishop of Rostov; after cross procession through Rostov defeated plague	18 October; 31 October; 21st Week after Pentecost; Седмица 21-я по Пятидесятнице	1964 (church-wide); 2nd half of the 15th century (local)	
2		Venerable wondermaker Nikon of Radonezh (☦ 1426) Преподобный Никон, Игумен Радонежский, чудотворец	Student of Sergius of Radonezh; was sent to the Vysotsky Monastery in Vysotsky; then moved back to Radonezh and after Sergius' death became hegumen; restored the monastery after Edigu's invasion; laid the first stone of the Trinity Cathedral; invited icon-writers Andrey Rublev and Daniel Chorny	17 November; 30 November; 25th Week after Pentecost; Седмица 25-я по Пятидесятнице	1547 (church-wide) mid-15th – early 16th century (local)	
3		Venerable Therapont of Beloozero (☦ 1426) Преподобный Ферапонт Белоезерский	At early years went to the Moscow Simonov Monastery; went to Beloozero and founded a kellion and the Nativity Monastery; near Mozhaisk founded the Ferapontov Monastery	27 May; 9 June; 1st Week after Pentecost. Fast-free week Седмица 1-я по Пятидесятнице (сплошная)	(1553) (church-wide)	
1		Venerable Cyril of Beloozero (☦ 1427) Преподобный Кирилл, игумен Белоезерский (Белозерский)	Kosma; hegumen of Beloozero; went to the Simonov Monastery and took the monastic name Cyril, became cook; for a short time archimandrit and the successor of Theodore, then returned to the Simonov Monastery; founded the Kirillo-Belozersky Monastery	9 June; 22 June; 2nd Week after Pentecost. All Russian Saints Day; Седмица 2-я по Пятидесятнице, Всех святых в земле Российской просиявших	until 1448 (church-wide)	
2		Venerable Paul of Komel (Obnora) (☦ 1429) Преподобный Павел Комельский или Обнорский	Student of Sergius of Radonezh; took monastic vows at the Nativity Monastery on the Wolga, then moved to the Trinity Monastery; after searching a place for isolation finally stayed by the River Nurma, where he built a kellion; built the Pavlo-Obnorsky Church	10 January; 23 January; 31st Week after Pentecost; Седмица 31-я по Пятидесятнице	1547 (church-wide); 1st half of the 16th century (local)	
6		Hieromartyr Patricius of Vladimir (☦ 1430/1411) Священномученик Патрикий Владимирский	Greek ecclesiarch of the Vladimir Cathedral; martyred by Tatars	3 July; 16 July; 6th Week after Pentecost; Седмица 6-я по Пятидесятнице	1982 (church-wide)	
4		Enlightener Metropolitan Photius (☦ 1431) Святитель Фотий Московский, митрополит Киевский и Владимирский	35th Metropolitan of Kiev (cathedra based in Moscow), Metropolitan of all Rus; assisted people in difficult times of Tatar terror	2 July; 15 July; 6th Week after Pentecost; Седмица 6-я по Пятидесятнице	1805	
3		Blessed Maxim of Moscow (☦ 1431) Блаженный Максим, Христа ради юродивый, Московский чудотворец	Fool for Christ, wondermaker of Moscow	11 November; 24 November; 26th Week after Pentecost; Седмица 26-я по Пятидесятнице	(1568) (church-wide); 1547 (local)	
2		Venerable Sabbatius of Solovki (☦ 1435) Преподобный Савватий Соловецкий	Monk of the Kirillo-Belozersky Monastery, then of Valaam Monastery; with Herman of Solovki founded the Solovetsky Monastery	27 September; 10 October; 18th Week after Pentecost; Седмица 18-я по Пятидесятнице	1547 (church-wide) around 1503 (local)	
6		Venerable Euthymius, enlightener of Karelia, and righteous Anthony and Felix (☦ 1435) Преподобный Евфимий, просветитель Карелии, и праведные Антоний и Феликс, местно чтимые	Euthymius founded the St. Nicholas Monastery; Anthony and Felix were righteous and devout posadniks of Novgorod	18 April; 1 May; 2nd Week after Pascha; Седмица 2-я по Пасхе	c. 1980, (Note: Only Euthymius, under All Russian Saints) c. 1990 (Note: All three, under Nikolo-Korelsk Saints) (church-wide); 2003, (Note: Synaxis of All Saints of Kola) 2004 (Note: Synaxis of All Saints of Karelia) (local)	
2		Venerable Dionysius of the River Glushitsa (☦ 1437) Преподобный Дионисий, игумен Глушицкий	Hegumen; founded five monasteries and one nunnery by the Glushitsa River, built the Intercession Church; icon-writer	1 June; 14 June; 1st Week after Pentecost (Low Week); Седмица 1-я по Пятидесятнице (сплошная)	1547 (church-wide); 1st half of the 16th century (local)	
3		Venerable Alexander of the River Kushta (☦ 1439) Преподобный Александр, игумен Куштский	Hegumen of the Kamenny Monastery; eventually cloistered himself by the Kushta River	9 June; 22 June; 2nd Week after Pentecost. All Russian Saints Day; Седмица 2-я по Пятидесятнице, Всех святых в земле Российской просиявших	2nd half of the 16th century (local)	
3		Enlighteners Gerasimus (☦ 1441), Pitirim (☦ 1456) and Jonah (☦ 1471) of Perm Святители Герасим, Питирим и Иона, епископы Пермские	3rd, 4th and 5th episcopes of Perm; enlightened wild Mansi people, helped victims of raids; Gerasimus and Pitirim were eventually killed, final peace under Jonah	29 January; 11 February; Fast-free week Седмица сплошная	(1607) (local)	
2		Venerable Gregory of the River Pelshma (☦ 1442) Преподобный Григорий Пельшемский	Henoch and pastor; after the death of his parents gave his property to the poor, freed serfs and went to the Nativity Monastery near Lake Galichskoye; ghostly father of Yuri of Zvenigorod; for a short time hegumen of the Saviour Monastery, moved to the woods of Vologda, went to the Sosnovetsky Monastery, where he met Dionysius of the River Glushitsa; founded the Pelshema Monastery by the Pelshma River; tried to conciliate Yuri of Zvenigorod and Vasily II; in very old age cloistered himself by the Pelshma and built kellions; died at age 127	30 September; 13 October; 19th Week after Pentecost; Седмица 19-я по Пятидесятнице	1549 (church-wide)	
3		Venerable Jakob of the Iron Pinery (☦ 1442) Преподобный Иаков Железноборовский	Became monk at Sergius of Radonezh's Monastery; cloistered himself into the Zhelezny Borok (Iron Pinery) forest; founded the John the Baptist Monastery; restored it after Mongol-Tatar raids, helped victims; in late years hegumen; foretold birth of Grand Prince Vasily II of Moscow	11 April; 24 April; Bright Week; Светлая седмица – сплошная	c. 1628	
3		Venerable Macarius of Yellow Waters and Unzha (☦ 1444) Преподобный Макарий Желтоводский, Унженский	Henoch of the Pechersky Ascension Monastery; ascetic; built by the Wolga River a kellion and later the Epiphany Monastery; founded the Makaryev Monastery on the mouth of the Kershenets River; preached Christianity to Mordvins, Tatars, Mari and Chuvash; at old age founded the Makaryeva Monastery near Unzha River	25 July; 7 August; 9th Week after Pentecost; Седмица 9-я по Пятидесятнице	1619 (church-wide)	
3		Venerable Barnabas of the River Vetluga (of Kostroma) (☦ 1445) Преподобный Варнава Ветлужский (Костромской)	Cleric of Veliky Ustyug and Vologda; became hermit and settled on the coast of the River Vetluga; self-discipline when taking food, ate grass and rarely bread	11 June; 24 June; 3rd Week after Pentecost; Седмица 3-я по Пятидесятнице	1639 (local)	
6		Venerable Arsenius of Konevets (☦ 1447) Преподобный Арсений Коневецкий (Коневский)	Henoch of the Valaam Monastery; when travelling to the Athon opened a monastery at the North; after storm moved to the Konevets Island, cast out demons and founded the Konevsky Monastery there	12 June; 25 June; 3rd Week after Pentecost; Седмица 3-я по Пятидесятнице	1981 (church-wide)	
1		Enlightener Ephraim of Rostov (☦ 1454) Святитель Ефрем, архиепископ Ростовский	Archbishop of Rostov; founded the Trinity-Sergiev Varnitsky Monastery	27 March; 9 April; 6th Week of the Great Lent (Palm Week); Седмица 6-я Великого поста (седмица ваий)	c. 1423 (local)	
2		Venerable Michael of Klopsk (☦ 1454) Преподобный Михаил Клопский, Христа ради юродивый	Monk of the Klopsky Monastery; ascetic and Fool-for-Christ; prophet and fortuneteller	11 January; 24 January; 31st Week after Pentecost; Седмица 31-я по Пятидесятнице	1547 (church-wide)	
4		Venerable Joasaph Kamensky (Spasokubensky) of Vologda (☦ 1457) Преподобный Иоасаф Каменский, или Спасокубенский, Вологодский чудотворец	Son of Prince Dmitry Vasilyevich of Zaozersk; took monastic vows at the Kamenny Monastery; wondermaker	10 September; 23 September; 16th Week after Pentecost; Седмица 16-я по Пятидесятнице	1841 (church-wide); 1457 (local)	
		Venerable Philip of Rabangа (☦ 1457) Преподобный Филипп Рабангский	Student of Dionysius of the River Glushitsa; Amphilochius as hegumen; hermit by the Sukhona River; founded the Transfiguration Rabangsky Monastery	15 November; 28 November; 25th Week after Pentecost; Седмица 25-я по Пятидесятнице	?	
2		Enlightener Euthymius of Novgorod (☦ 1458) Святитель Евфимий, архиепископ Новгородский	Archbishop of Novgorod; John at early age went to the Vyazhishchsky Monastery and became Euthymius; built churches in Novgorod, helped the poor, enlightened people	11 March; 24 March; 4th Week of the Great Lent; Седмица 4-я Великого поста	1549	
6		Venerable Paisius of Galich (☦ 1460) Преподобный Паисий Галичский	Hegumen of the Uspensko-Nikolayevsky Monastery of Galich	23 May; 5 June; 7th Week after Pascha; Седмица 7-я по Пасхе	1981 (church-wide)	
2		Venerable Sabbas Stylites of Vishera, wondermaker of Novgorod (☦ 1460) Преподобный Савва, Вишерский столпник, Новгородский чудотворец	Pillar saint; founded the Savvo-Vishersky Monastery	1 October; 14 October; 19th Week after Pentecost; Седмица 19-я по Пятидесятнице	1549 (church-wide); 1464 (local)	
2		Enlightener Metropolitan Jonah of Moscow and all Rus (☦ 1461) Святитель Иона, митрополит Московский и Всея России, Чудотворец	38th and last Metropolitan of Kiev (cathedra based in Moscow), Metropolitan of all Rus; at early age became monk at a monastery at the village Unorozh, near Galich, then moved to the Simonov Monastery, where he became baker; episcope of Ryazan and Murom; during his term the Russian Church became factually autocephalous	31 March; 13 April; 6th Week of the Palm Week (Palm Sunday, Fig Sunday); Седмица 6-я ваий (цветоносная, Вербное воскресенье)	1547 (church-wide); 1472 (local)	
3		Venerable Barlaam of the Vaga (of Shenkursk) (☦ 1462) Преподобный Варлаам Важский, или Шенкурский	Vasily, son of boyars; preached Christianity to the pagans of the North (now in Arkhangelsk Oblast); founded a monastery by the Vaga River	19 June; 2 July; 4th Week after Pentecost; Седмица 4-я по Пятидесятнице	1630	
6		Enlightener Tryphon of Rostov (☦ 1468) Святитель Трифон, епископ Ростовский	Archbishop of Rostov and Yaroslav; archimandrit of the Novospassky Monastery; ghostly father of Grand Prince Vasily II of Moscow	1 February; 14 February; Fast-free week Седмица сплошная	1964 (church-wide)	
2		Enlightener Jonah of Novgorod (☦ 1470) Святитель Иона, архиепископ Новгородский	Archbishop of Novgorod; hegumen of the Otinskaya Monastery; restored the Dmitriev Monastery of Novgorod; prevented assassination of Grand Prince Vasily II of Moscow by conspirators; founded and built several churches	5 November; 18 November; 24th Week after Pentecost; Седмица 24-я по Пятидесятнице	1549	
3		Venerable Euthymius of the Syanzhema (☦ 1470) Преподобный Евфимий Сянжемский	Monk of the Kamenny Monastery; hermit by the Kushta River, when meeting Alexander of the Kushta River moved to the coast of the River Syanzhemki; after students came to him founded the Feast of Ascension Monastery	20 January; 2 February; 32nd Week after Pentecost; Седмица 32-я по Пятидесятнице	1549–1721, 1841 (church-wide)	
5		Hieromartyr Isidorе the Presbyter and with him 72 martyrs of Yuryev (☦ 1472) Священномученик Исидор Пресвитер и иже с ним 72 мученика Юрьевских	Presbyter Isidore and with him 72 Orthodox Christians were martyred in the German-occupied city of Yuryev for refusing to convert to Roman Catholicism	8 January; 21 January; 31st Week after Pentecost; Седмица 31-я по Пятидесятнице	1897 (local)	
3		Blessed Isidorе Tverdislov of Rostov (☦ 1474) Блаженный Исидор Твердислов, Христа Ради Юродивый, Ростовский чудотворец	Tverdislov means firm word person; Ascetic from Prussia, turning Orthodox; wondermaker, Fool-for-Christ	14 May; 27 May; 6th Week after Pascha; Седмица 6-я по Пасхе	1549 (church-wide)	
6		Venerable Hilarion of Pskov (Gdov) (☦ 1476) Преподобный Иларион Псковоезерский, Гдовский	Student of Euphrosynus of Pskov; founder and first hegumen of the Ozersky Pokrovsky Monastery near Gdov	28 March; 10 April; 6th Week of the Great Lent (Palm Week); Седмица 6-я Великого поста (седмица ваий)	1987 (church-wide)	
2		Venerable Paphnutius of Borovsk (☦ 1477) Преподобный Пафнутий Боровский	Parfeny took the monastic vows and became Paphnutius; spiritual son of Nikita of Serpukhov, who was student of Sergius of Radonezh; hegumen of the Intercession Monastery; left to the forest where the Paphnutius of Borovsk Monastery was founded; known for his benevolence	1 May; 14 May; 4th Week after Pascha; Седмица 4-я по Пасхе	1547 (church-wide); 1531 (local)	
2		Venerable Zosima of Solovki (☦ 1478) Преподобный Зосима, игумен Соловецкий	Hegumen; with Herman of Solovki built a kellion, churches and a monastery on the Solovetsky Islands; one of the founders of the Solovetsky Monastery	17 April; 30 April; 2nd Week after Pascha; Седмица 2-я по Пасхе	1547 (church-wide) around 1503 (local)	
3		Venerable Herman of Solovki (☦ 1479) Преподобный Герман Соловецкий	Hermit of Belomorye near a chapel; once wanted to be stranded on the Solovetsky Islands, met Zosima of Solovki and built there a kellion, churches and a monastery on the Solovetsky Islands; one of the founders of the Solovetsky Monastery	30 July; 12 August; 10th Week after Pentecost; Седмица 10-я по Пятидесятнице	1690 or 1691 (local)	
3		Venerable Alexander Osheven (☦ 1479) Преподобный Александр Ошевенский	Monk; known to the world Alexey, took monastic vows at the Kirillo-Belozersky Monastery; founder and first hegumen of the Alexandro-Oshevensky Monastery	20 April; 2 May; 2nd Week after Pascha; Седмица 2-я по Пасхе	1577–80 (local)	
		Venerable Macarius of the Glushitsa (☦ 1480) Преподобный Макарий Глушицкий	Matthew, son of Dionysius of Rostov; Macarius later became presbyter of a monastery	13 October; 26 October; 20th Week after Pentecost; Седмица 20-я по Пятидесятнице	?	
6		Venerable Serapion of Spaso-Eleasarovsky (☦ 1480) Преподобный Серапион Спасоелеазаровский	Henoch; when meeting ven. Eleazar became hermit; prophesied the failed German raid of 1480; cured people	8 September; 21 September; 15th Week after Pentecost, before the Feast of the Cross; Седмица 15-я по Пятидесятнице, перед Воздвижением	1987 (church-wide)	
2		Venerable Euphrosynus of Pskov, baptized Eleazar (☦ 1481) Преподобный Евфросин, во Святом Крещении Елеазар, Псковский	Monk from Snetogorsky Monastery; founded a monastic community near Pskov	15 May; 28 May; 6th Week after Pascha; Седмица 6-я по Пасхе	1549 (church-wide); 1st half of the 16th century (local)	
5		Venerable Antonius of Krasnу Kholm (☦ 1481) Преподобный Антоний Краснохолмский	Hieromonk of the Kirillo-Belozersky Monastery; founded the St. Nicholas Monastery	17 January; 30 January; 32nd Week after Pentecost; Седмица 32-я по Пятидесятнице	1979 (church-wide); 1904 (local)	
1		Enlightener Bassian I of Rostov (☦ 1481) Святитель Вассиан I, Архиепископ Ростовский	Archbishop of Rostov and Yaroslav; relative of Joseph Volotsky, favourite student of Paphnutius of Borovsk; henoch of the St. Sergius Trinity Monastery, archmandrite of the Novospassky Monastery; didactive, built churches in Rostov	23 March; 5 April; 5th Week of the Great Lent. Feast of the Annunciation (Sunday of the Akafist); Седмица 5-я Великого поста. Похвала Пресвятой Богородицы (Суббота Акафиста)	1481 (church-wide); 1964 (local)	
1		Venerable Dositheus of the High Lake (☦ 1482) Преподобный Досифей Верхнеостровский	Hieromonk; student of Euphrosyne of Pskov; founded the St. Peter and Paul Monastery on the island within the High Pskovian Lake	8 October; 21 October; 20th Week after Pentecost; Седмица 20-я по Пятидесятнице	1481-2 (church-wide); 1987 (local)	
2		Venerable Macarius of Kalyazin (of Kolyazin) (☦ 1483) Преподобный Макарий Калязинский (Колязинский)	Hegumen, Matthew to the world; took monastic vows at the Nikolayevsky Klobukovsky Monastery; founded the Trinity Kalyazinsky Monastery, named after boyar and future henoch Ivan Kolyaga; built churches	17 March; 30 March; 4th Week of the Great Lent; Седмица 4-я Великого поста	1547 (church-wide); 1521 (local)	
3		Venerable Martinian of Beloozero (☦ 1483) Преподобный Мартиниан Белоезерский (Белозерский)	Hegumen; took monastic vows at the Kirillo-Belozersky Monastery, follower of Kirill of Belozersk; in late years founded the Bozheozersky Saviour Monastery; once when Vasily II visited the monastery, Martinian blessed him and foresaw his great rule, became his personal priest; became hegumen of the St. Sergius Trinity Monastery	12 January; 25 January; 31st Week after Pentceost. Sunday after the Holy Manifestation; Седмица 31-я по Пятидесятнице. Суббота пo Богоявлении	(1553) (church-wide)	
1		Enlightener Metropolitan Gerontius of Moscow (☦ 1489) Святитель Геронтий, митрополит Московский	41st Metropolitan of all Rus, 3rd Metropolitan of Moscow; hegumen of the Simonov Monastery and episcope of Kolomensk; helped to build and reconstruct religious buildings, including the Metropolitan House and the Dormition Cathedral in the Moscow Kremlin	28 May; 10 June; 1st Week after Pentecost, fast-free week Седмица 1-я по Пятидесятнице, сплошная	late 15th century (church-wide); 2001 (local)	
5		Venerable Tikhon of Medyn (Kaluga) (☦ 1492) Преподобный Тихон Медынский, или Калужский	Henoch of Moscow; hermit in the area around Medyn, near Kaluga; ate only grass and drank water from a well; several students came to him, including Photius and Gerasim; wondermaker	16 June; 29 June; 3rd Week after Pentecost; Седмица 3-я по Пятидесятнице	1909 (church-wide); 1533–1584 (local)	
2		Venerable Ephraim of Perekom (☦ 1492) Преподобный Ефрем Перекомский	Ephraim, known to the world Eustathius; became monk at the Kalyazinsky Monastery; took monastic vows at the Savvo-Vishersky Monastery and cloistered himself by the Ilmen Lake, where he founded the Perekamsky Monastery	16 May; 29 May; 6th Week after Pascha; Седмица 6-я по Пасхе	1549 (church-wide); 1st half of the 16th century (local)	
6		Venerable Cosmas of the Yakhroma (☦ 1492) Преподобный Косма Яхромский	Once when hearing a voice by the Yakhroma River and seeing a Dormition of the Mother of God icon on a tree, became monk at the Kiev Caves Monastery; returned and founded the Kosma of Yakhroma Monastery	18 February; 3 March; 1st Week of the Great Lent; Седмица 1-я Великого поста	1982 (church-wide)	
6		Venerable Leontius of Karakhov (of Karikhov) (☦ 1492/1429) Преподобный Леонтий Караховский (Кариховский)	Founded the Karakhovsky Monastery in Novgorod	18 July; 31 July; 8th Week after Pentecost; Седмица 8-я по Пятидесятнице	1981 (local)	
6		Venerable Nectarius of Bezhetsk (☦ 1492) Преподобный Нектарий Бежецкий	Founded the Presentation Monastery in Tver	3 April; 16 April; Holy Week; Страстная седмица	1979 (church-wide); 1904 (local)	
3		Blessed John of Ustyug (☦ 1494) Блаженный Иоанн, Христа ради Юродивый, Устюжский Чудотворец	At early age, influenced by his mother and future nun, moved to Veliky Ustyug and stayed near the Dormition church; Fool for Christ, wondermaker; healed Maria, wife of Prince Theodore the Red	29 May; 11 June; 1st Week after Pentecost, fast-free week Седмица 1-я по Пятидесятнице (сплошная)	1647 (church-wide); 1547 (local)	
3		Venerable Sabbas of the Lake Krypets (Pskov) (☦ 1495) Преподобный Савва Крыпецкий (Псковский)	Serbian henoch who moved to Russia; became monk at the Snetogorsky Monastery in Pskov, then moved near the Tolva River with assistance of Euphrosyne of Pskov and finally near the Krypets Lake; built the St. John church; healed voivode Yaroslav Vasilyevich Obolensky's wife	28 August; 10 September; 14th Week after Pentecost; Седмица 14-я по Пятидесятнице	1554 (local)	
4		Hieromartyr Metropolitan Macarius of Kiev (☦ 1497) Священномученик Макарий, Митрополит Киевский	Metropolitan of Kiev; became archimandrite of the Holy Trinity Monastery of Vilnius; shortly before another one of the seemingly endless Tatar raids stayed in Kiev and ordered the people to secure themselves; they found him near the altar headless	1 May; 14 May; 4th Week after Pascha; Седмица 4-я по Пасхе	1762 (church-wide); 1643 (local)	

== See also ==
- Canonization in the Russian Orthodox Church
- Metropolis of Kiev and all Rus' (c. 988–1448)
- List of metropolitans and patriarchs of Moscow
- List of Eastern Orthodox saints
- List of American Eastern Orthodox saints
