= Lav Anikita Filolog =

Lav Anikita Filolog (Serbian: Лав Аникита Филолог) was a late 15th and early 16th-century Serbian writer who worked mostly in Russia.

An intense cultural exchange followed when Serbian intellectuals found refuge in Russia after the fall of the Serbian Despotate in 1459. One of such man of letters was Lav Anikita Filolog who wrote eulogies about Russian saints and boyars.

== Life and work ==
At the time of the decline of Serbian literature when the Turks invaded the land, he became famous for his scholarship and literary skill, long before 1530, he was invited to Imperial Russia, where he wrote "A Word of Praise to Mikhail Chernigovsky and the Boyar Fyodor". Also, at the request of the monks of the Solovetsky Monastery, he wrote, returning to Serbia at the time, two letters of praise to the Solovetsky saints (Slovo Zosimu and Slovo Savatiju, both between 1534 and 1542) based on a reworking of older Russian non-literary versions. There are assumptions that Lav Anikita is the author of the anonymous "Life of Josif Volocki".

== See also ==
- Lazar of Hilandar (also known as Lazar the Serb)
- Teodosije the Hilandarian (1246–1328), one of the most important Serbian writers in the Middle Ages
- Elder Grigorije (fl. 1310–1355), builder of Saint Archangels Monastery
- Pachomius the Serb
- Dimitrije Ljubavić
- Hieromonk Pahomije
- Božidar Vuković
- Božidar Goraždanin
- Đurađ Crnojević
- Hieromonk Makarije
- Hieromonk Mardarije
- Hegumen Mardarije
- Vićenco Vuković
- Trojan Gundulić
- Andrija Paltašić
- Jakov of Kamena Reka

== Literature ==
- Dimitrije Bogdanović: "History of Old Serbian Literature", Belgrade, SKZ, 1980.
- Dejan Mihailović: "Byzantine Circle (Small Dictionary of Early Christian Literature in Greek, Byzantine and Old Serbian Literature)", Belgrade, "Institute for Textbooks", 2009, p. 121
