= Ksenia of Yaroslavl =

Princess of Yaroslavl

Ksenia or Xenia of Yaroslavl (died in the 1290s), was a Princess of Yaroslavl by marriage to Prince Basil of Yaroslavl, and regent of the Principality of Yaroslavl during the minority of her grandson prince Michael of Yaroslavl.

== Life ==
Her origin is unknown. She married Vasily Vsevolodovich of Yaroslavl, and became the mother of Maria/Anastasia Vladimirnovna of Yaroslavl. Her daughter married Theodore the Black, who was named the successor of his father-in-law. Her husband died in 1249. The history of the state during the following years are not fully confirmed. Traditionally, Vasily is claimed to have been succeeded by his brother Konstantin Vsevolodovich, who died in 1257, but there is no confirmed information about this. It is known that Theodore the Black became Prince of Yaroslavl by marriage to Anastasia of Yaroslavl, and he would have been married to Maria/Anastasia around 1260. His mother-in-law was however described as the dominant political figure in Yaroslavl.

In 1288, Theodore departed Yaroslavl to have his claims to rule formally confirmed by Khan Mengu-Timur, with his mother-in-law as regent during his absence. During his stay with the khan, a marriage was discussed between him and the khan's daughter. During his absence, Xenia secured the support of the boyars and revolted, placing her grandson Michael on the throne with her and her daughter as co-regents during his minority.

When Theodor returned to Yaroslavl, he was met with closed gates and refused entry. He secured the support of the khan who twice sent messegers to reprimand Xenia that Theodor was the legal ruler of Yaroslavl, but Xenia refused every time with support of the boyars.

Theodore was not able to secure his rule of Yaroslavl until after the death of Xenia, Maria and Michael.
