= Abraham and Coprius of Gryazovets =

Saints Abraham and Coprius of Gryazovets

Saints
- Born: Unknown
- Died: Unknown
- Venerated in: Russian Orthodox Church
- Canonized: 1841, Vologda, Russia by Bishop Innocentius (Borisov)
- Feast: February 4

Abraham and Coprius of Gryazovets (Russian: Авраамий и Коприй Гразовецкий, Abraham and Coprius of Pechenega) founded the Christian monastery at Gryazovets in Russia.

They were born in Russia, and built the monastery of Gryazovets, at 21 versts from Vologda, around 1492, on the banks of Petshenga River. With no funds they succeeded to build a Transfiguration of the Lord church from scratch of hermitage named in honor of Our Saviour (Спасская пустынь) on the river Petchenga, in Gryazovetsk parish. And thus a monastery was founded. Blessed toilers did not spare themselves, jealously struggling for the Lord until their very death. This tenement was abolished in 1764. The time of their death is unknown. The relics of them were resting under a bushel in the Preobrazhensky (Transfiguration of the Lord) monastery church. The basic information about Abraham and Coprius is contained in the Description of the Russian Saints (known in the Chronicles of the end of the 17th - 18th centuries), which reports that 'in the summer of 7000' (the conditional date, i.e., up to 1492) they settled on the river and built a church.

The time of a separate local canonization is unknown, but in 1841 they entered the Synaxis of All Saints of Vologda, established by the bishop Innocentius (Borisov). Their feast day is celebrated on February 4 in the Russian Orthodox Church.
