= Romanchuk =

Romanchuk is a surname common to Belarus and Ukraine. Other forms of the surname are Ramanchuk or Ramančuk (Belarusian: Раманчук), Romańczuk, Romančuk, Romanchik, and Romantschuk.

== People ==
=== Romanchuk ===
- Alexander Romanchuk (born 1959), Russian colonel general
- Daniel Romanchuk (born 1998), American Paralympian athlete
- Ivan Romanchuk (born 1990), Ukrainian footballer
- Jaroslav Romanchuk (born 1966), Belarusian economist and politician
- Mark Romanchuk (born 1962), American politician and businessman
- Maryna Bekh-Romanchuk (born 1995), Ukrainian long jumper
- Mykhailo Romanchuk (born 1996), Ukrainian swimmer
- Oleksandr Romanchuk (footballer, born 1984) (born 1984), Ukrainian footballer
- Oleksandr Romanchuk (footballer, born 1999), Ukrainian footballer
- Roman Romanchuk (boxer) (1979–2016), Ukrainian-Russian boxer
- Roman Romanchuk (footballer) (born 1986), Ukrainian footballer
- Ruslan Romanchuk (born 1974), Ukrainian footballer
- Serhiy Romanchuk (born 1982), Ukrainian strongman and powerlifter
- Vitaly Romanchuk (born 1950), Soviet-Belarusian water polo player

=== Romańczuk or Romanczuk ===
- Bartosz Romańczuk (born 1983), Polish footballer
- Mark Romanczuk (born 1983), American baseball player
- Szymon (Romańczuk) (1936–2017), Polish Orthodox archbishop
- Taras Romanczuk (born 1991), Ukrainian-born Polish footballer
