= Feast of All Saints of Russia =

Day of remembrance celebrated in the Russian Orthodox Church

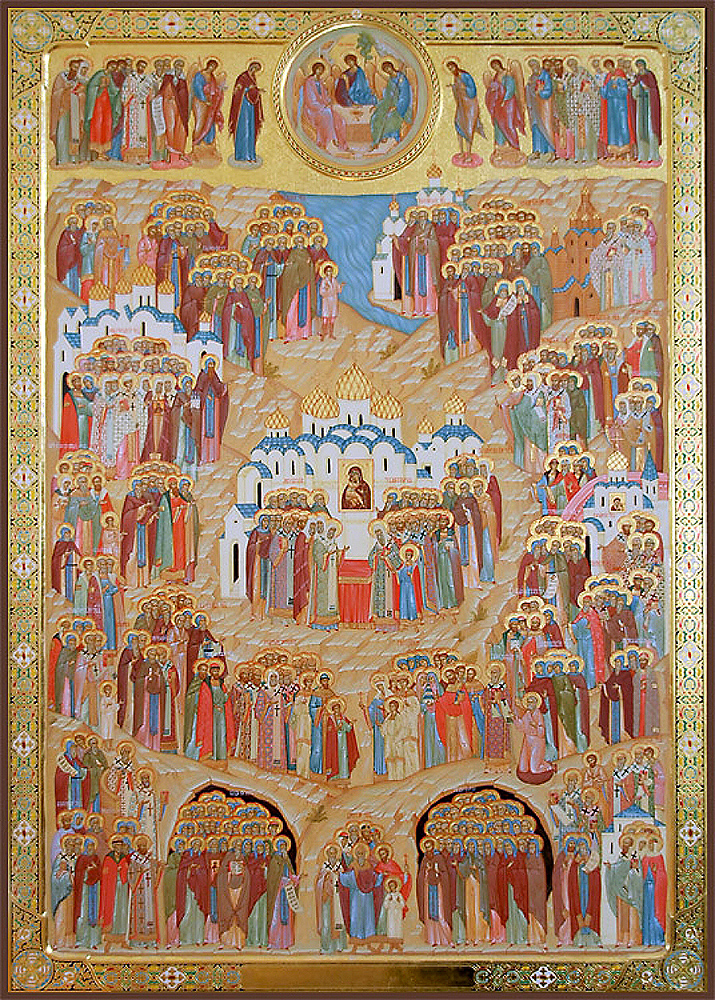
Modern icon of All Saints of Russia

The Feast of All Saints of Russia, also known as The Feast Day of All Russian Saints Resplendent in the Russian land (Church Slavonic: Собо́ръ всѣ́хъ ст҃ы́хъ, въ землѝ рѡссі́йстѣй просїѧ́вшихъ; Russian: Собор всех святых, в земле Русской просиявших), is a day of remembrance celebrated in the Russian Orthodox Church on the second Sunday after Pentecost. It is dedicated to all Russian Orthodox saints: those who are canonized, and those whose deeds are unknown.

== History ==
=== Macarius councils ===
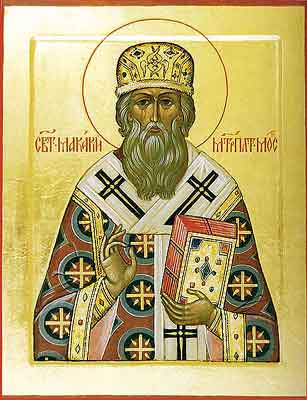
Metropolitan Macarius of Moscow

After becoming Metropolitan of all Rus' in 1542, Macarius convened councils in Moscow in 1547 and 1549 to consider the glorification of Russian saints. Thirty (or thirty-one) church-wide saints and nine locally venerated saints were canonized at the councils. The issue of future canonization was also resolved, with veneration now subject to the church's collective judgment.

Church-wide saints glorified by the 1547 council include:

- Jonah, Metropolitan of Moscow and All Russia (died 1461)
- John, Archbishop of Novgorod (died 1186)
- Macarius of Kalyazin (died 1483)
- Paphnutius of Borovsk (died 1477)
- Alexander Nevsky (died 1263)
- Nikon of Radonezh (died 1426)
- Paul of Komel and Obnora (died 1429)
- Michael of Klopsk (died 1456)
- Sabbas of Storozhi (died 1406)
- Zosimas of Solovki (died 1478)
- Sabbatius of Solovki (died 1435)
- Dionysius of Glushitsa (died 1437)
- Alexander of Svir (died 1533)

Saints identified for local veneration by the council include:

- Blessed Maximus of Moscow (died 1434)
- Constantine of Murom and his children, Michael and Theodore (died 1129)
- Peter and Fevronia of Murom (died 1228)
- Arsenius of Tver (died 1409)
- Blessed Procopius (died 1303) and John of Ustyug (died 1494)

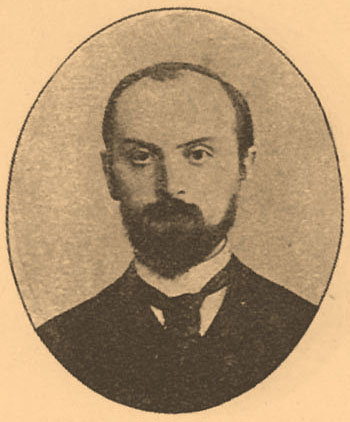
Boris Turaev

Church-wide saints glorified by the 1549 council reportedly include:

- Niphon, Archbishop of Novgorod (died 1156)
- Jonah (died 1470) and Euthymius (died 1458) of Novgorod
- James, Bishop of Rostov (died 1392)
- Stephen of Perm (died 1396)
- Vsevolod of Pskov (died 1138)
- Michael of Tver (died 1318)
- Abraham of Smolensk (died c. 1222)
- Anthony, John, and Eustathius of Lithuania (died 1347)
- Euthymius of Suzdal (died 1404)
- Gregory of Pelshema (died 1442)
- Sabbas of Vishera (died 1460)
- Euphrosyne of Pskov (died 1481)
- Ephraim of Perekom (died 1492)
- Abraham of Bulgaria (died 1229)
- Arsenius of Serbia (died 1266)

The 1547 council also established a day of remembrance for "new Russian miracle workers".

=== 1918 resumption ===
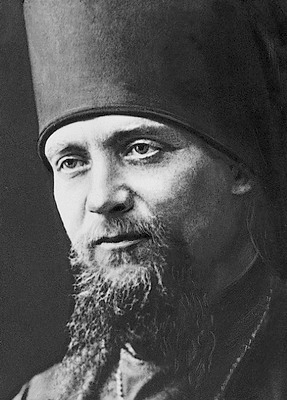
Bishop Athanasius Sakharov

Petrograd University professor Boris Turaev and hieromonk Athanasius Sakharov wanted to restore the feast. Both were members of the 1917–18 Local Council of the Russian Orthodox Church. On March 15, 1918, Turaev appeared at a meeting to report his request to restore the feast. On August 20, 1918, Turaev's report was reviewed by the council on August 20 of that year and, on August 26, restored the feast; it would be celebrated on the first Sunday of Peter's Fast.

=== Soviet era ===
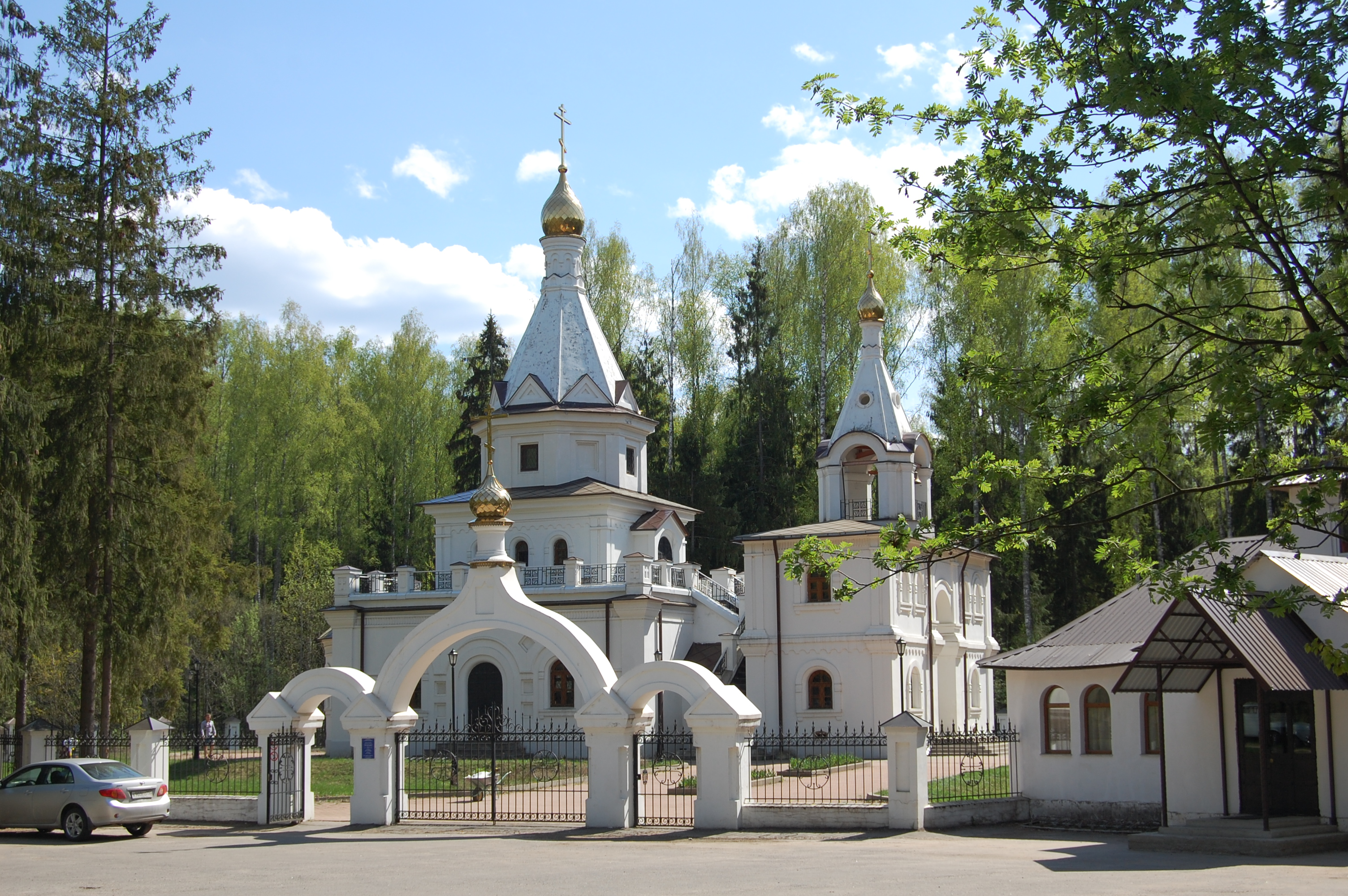
All Russian Saints Church in Dubna, Moscow oblast
