= Fyodor Rostislavich =

Russian saint (c. 1240–c. 1299)

Fyodor Rostislavich the Black
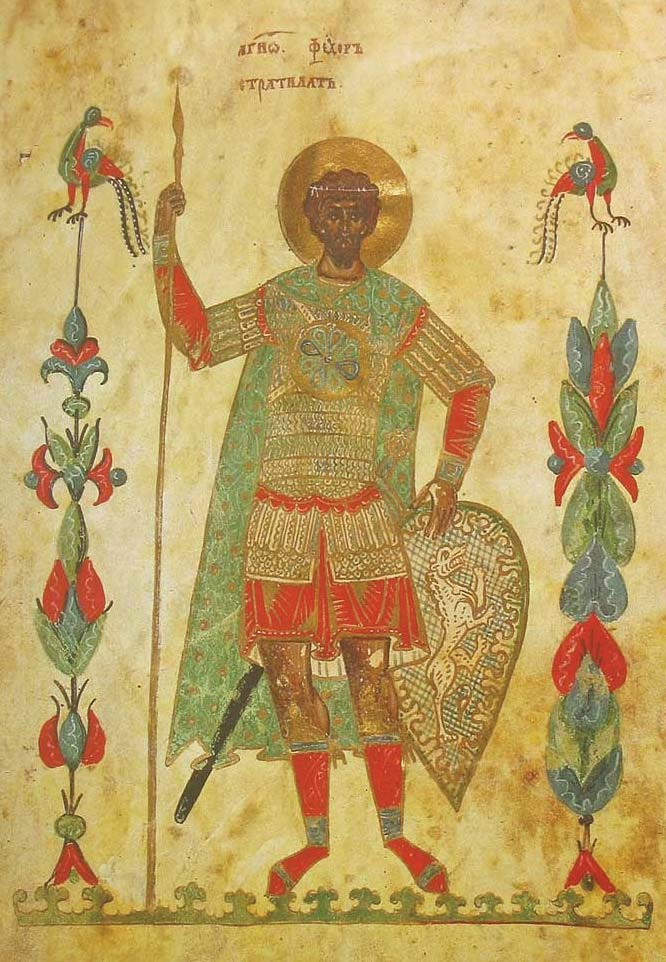
- Fyodorstratelate
- Born: 1230s Russia
- Died: 1299
- Patronage: Russian Orthodox Church

Duke Fyodor Rostislavich nicknamed Fyodor the Black or Fyodor Chermny (Note: The epithet "Chermny" may mean "red-haired".) (c. 1230s – 1298), Феодор Ростиславич Чёрный (Чермный)) is a saint of the Russian Orthodox Church and was a ruler of Smolensk and Yaroslavl. The alternative interpretation of his nickname is Theodore the Beautiful.

== Biography ==
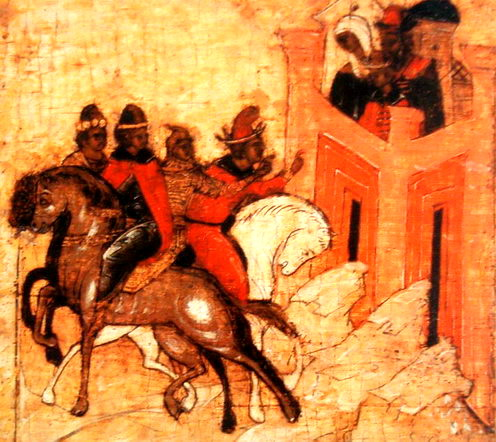
Theodore, David and Constantine come to regain Yaroslavl from Xenia. Icon copy, 1560s

=== Early years ===
His father, Prince Rostislav Mstislavovich of Smolensk, died in 1240. Since his birth, Fyodor was a Duke of Mozhaysk. In 1260 Fyodor married Maria Vasilievna (born between 1243 and 1249), the daughter of Prince Vasily of Yaroslavl. Contemporary research indicates, that her actual name was Anastasia, and only after the 16–17th centuries changed in fasti by mistake. Through marriage Fyodor became prince of Yaroslavl, however, the actual power was concentrated in hands of Princess Xenia of Yaroslavl, Maria's mother. With this wife Theodore had two daughters and a son, Michael.

=== Golden Horde ===
Bored with his status, around 1266 Fyodor left his family and on his own initiative went to Sarai, the capital of the Golden Horde. He became a loyal servant and military commander of Khan Mengu-Timur. Fyodor the Black took part in Mengu-Timur invasion in Ossetia, in 1277–1278 he headed the punitive campaign in the Volga Bulgaria. According to the historical documents, his troops sacked 40 cities and 600 villages with the peculiar ferocity.

Upon the successful campaign Mengu-Timur promoted Fyodor to his butler and offered to marry one of his daughters. The fasti state, that Fyodor rejected this offer, because he still had a wife in Yaroslavl. Three years later he received a message about Maria's death and came back to Yaroslavl, trying to regain the power. However, Xenia and the boyars refused to let enter the city, so he came back to the Horde.

Later Fyodor married the daughter of Mengu-Timur, who was baptized and received the Christian name Anna. With the marriage Theodore received a huge dowry (according to the fasti, 36 towns) and rose to prominence in the Horde. He and Anna had two sons, David and Constantine. In 1290 Michael Theodorovich died in Yaroslavl, so Theodore the Black with his Jarlig from the Mongols returned in the city to rule.

=== Prince of Yaroslavl ===
Upon death of his brothers in 1278–1279, Fyodor inherited the Principality of Smolensk. Presumably, in 1279–1281 he resided in Smolensk, then again moved to the Horde. Later he took part in the war between the sons of Alexander Nevsky, that ended with the destruction of many Russian towns by both the Mongols and the Russians.

In 1293 Fyodor took part in Dyuden's punitive campaign in northeastern Rus', in which 14 towns were sacked by the Mongols and their Rus' allies for disloyalty to the new khan.

=== Last years ===
In his last years Fyodor the Black became a monk and died in Yaroslavl in 1299. He was canonized due to the depth of deathbed repentance.

== Sources ==
- Shirokorad, Alexander (2010). Альтернатива Москве. Великие княжества Смоленское, Рязанское, Тверское [The Alternatives to Moscow: Grand Principalities of Smolensk, Ryazan', and Tver]. Moscow: AST. p. 54. ISBN 978-5457162853.
- Ankhimuck, J. V. (1992). Церковь Петра и Павла в Ярославле: легенда и исторические реалии [The Church of St Peter and Pavel in Yaroslavl: Legends and Historical Facts] (in Russian). Yaroslavl: Yaroslavl archives. pp. 10–11.
- Vasilyev, J. S. (1995). БЕЛОЗЕРСКИЕ КНЯЗЬЯ: Русские летописи о белозерских князьях и крае (до XV века) [Princes of Beloozero: Russian fasti on the Principality of Beloozero (up to the 15th century)] (in Russian). Beloozero: The Almanac of Regional History.
- Halperin, Charles (1987). Russia and the Golden Horde: The Mongol Impact on Medieval Russian History. Indiana University Press. p. 145. ISBN 9780253013668.
