= Avraamiev Monastery =

Monastery in Russia

- Russian: Авраа́миев монастырь
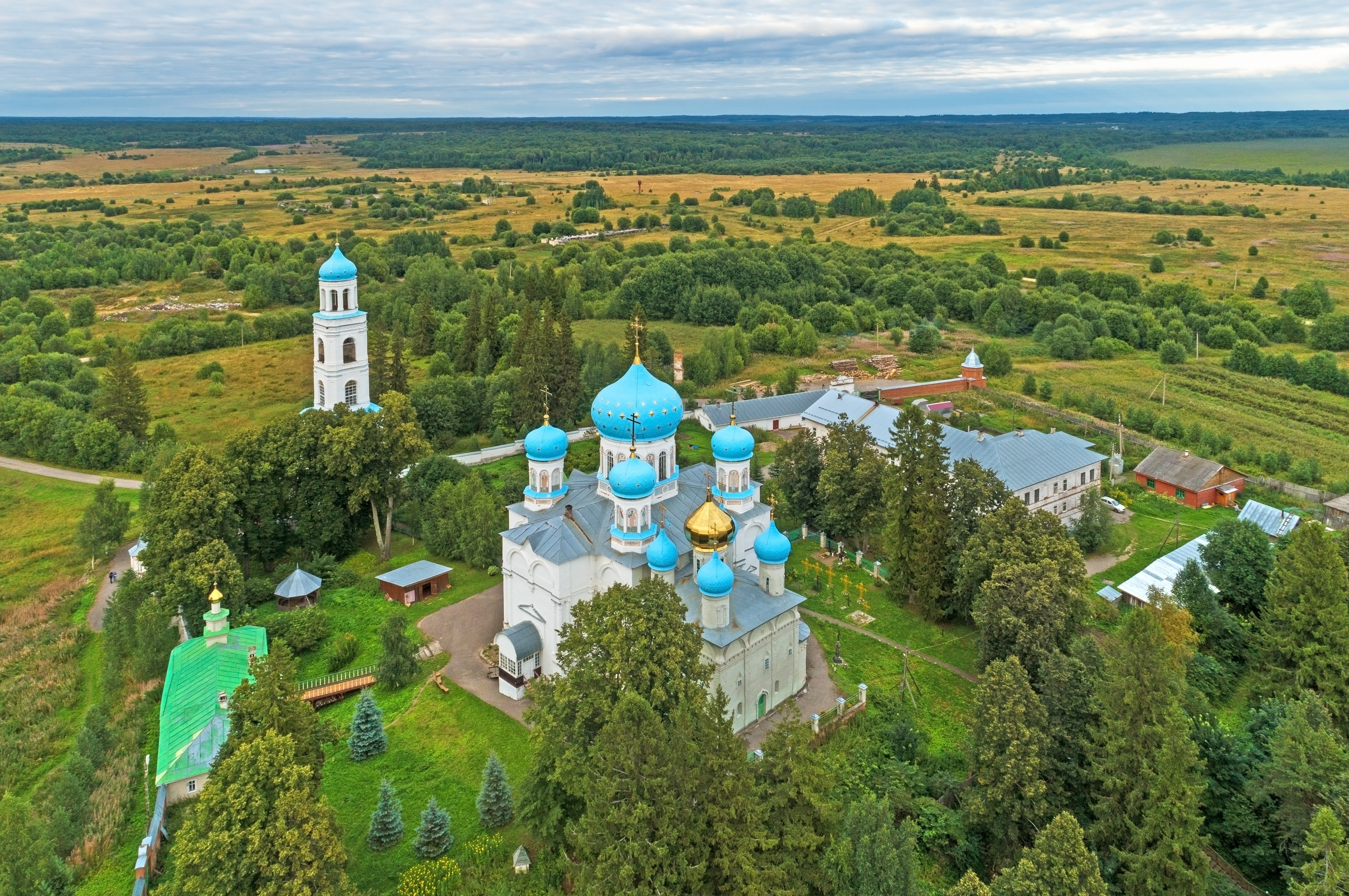

- Location within Russia
- Interactive map of Avraamiev Monastery

Monastery information
- Full name: Avraamiev Pokrovsky Gorodetsky Monastery
- Mother house: Mother of God
- Diocese: Galich Diocese

People
- Founder: Abraham of Galich

Site
- Coordinates: 58°48′53″N 42°36′50″E

Avraamiev Pokrovsky Gorodetsky Monastery (Russian: Авраа́миев Покро́вский Городе́цкий монастырь) is a male monastery in the Galich Diocese of the Russian Orthodox Church in the village of Nozhkino, Kostroma Oblast, on the shore of Lake Chukhloma. The architectural ensemble is included in the list of monuments protected at the regional level.

== History ==
This monastery was founded in the last third of the 14th century by The Venerable Monk Abraham of Galich, disciple of Saint Sergius of Radonezh (after having founded a monastery on the shores of Lake Galich, dedicated to the Dormition of the Mother of God). Abraham built a wooden church dedicated to the Protection of the Mother of God where many local residents came to pray. Shortly before his death (in 1375), The Venerable Monk had settled in a skete near his community.

=== 17th - 19th centuries ===
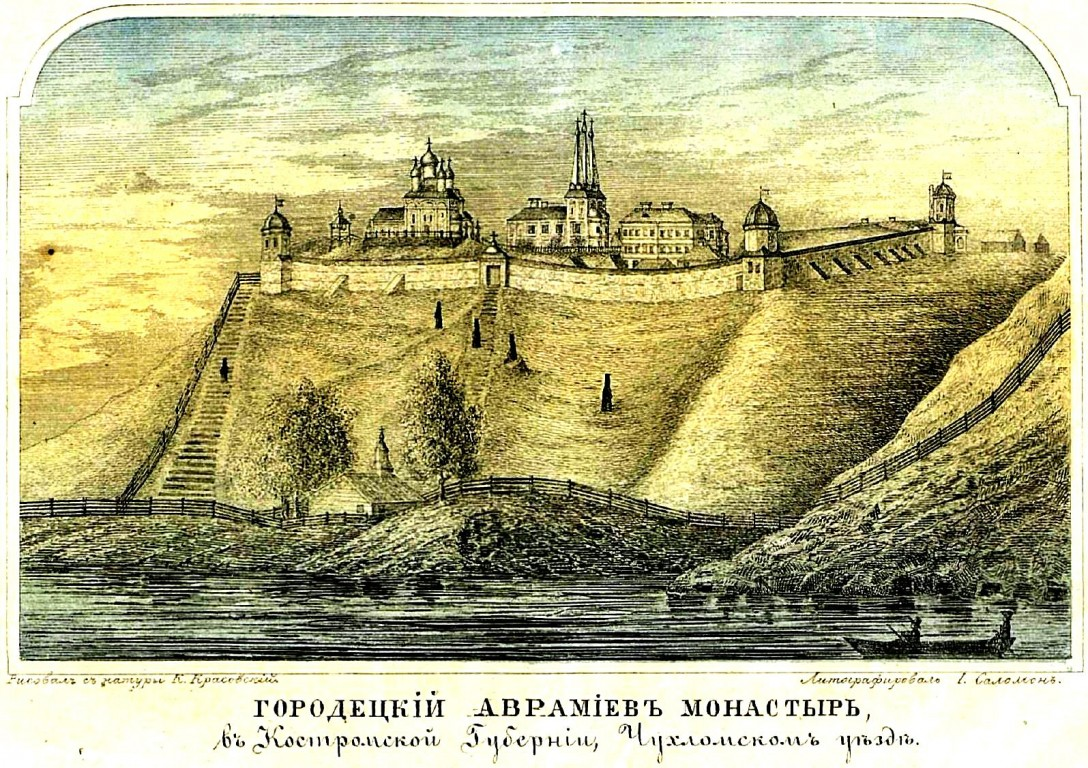
The monastery in the 19th century

The monastery was built in stone at the beginning of the 17th century. The Church of Protection was built in 1608 at the request of Tsar Vasili IV and under the blessing of Patriarch Saint Hermogenes. It was only completed in 1631 due to the overthrow of Vasili. It is the first stone church to be built in the northern parts of Kostroma. It is built on the site of the tomb of The Venerable Abraham. Stone construction continued during the 1640s. The Gate Church and the Church of the Nativity were completed at the end of the 17th century. The monastery began to decline under Peter the Great. The bell tower of the catholicon was demolished in 1848.

In 1857, construction began on the site of the Ilyinsky chapel of the Church of Protection, a new large church in honor of the Eleusa icon. The plans were from the architect Konstantin Thon. It was consecrated in 1867. Shortly after, the Church of the Nativity was dismantled.

Abraham's eastern tomb was covered with a silver chase in 1808, with a new one in 1895. It was largely financed by native peasants from Chukhloma who came to work in Saint Petersburg. Above the well dug by Abraham, a small wooden chapel was built where people come in procession every year.

=== Early 20th century ===
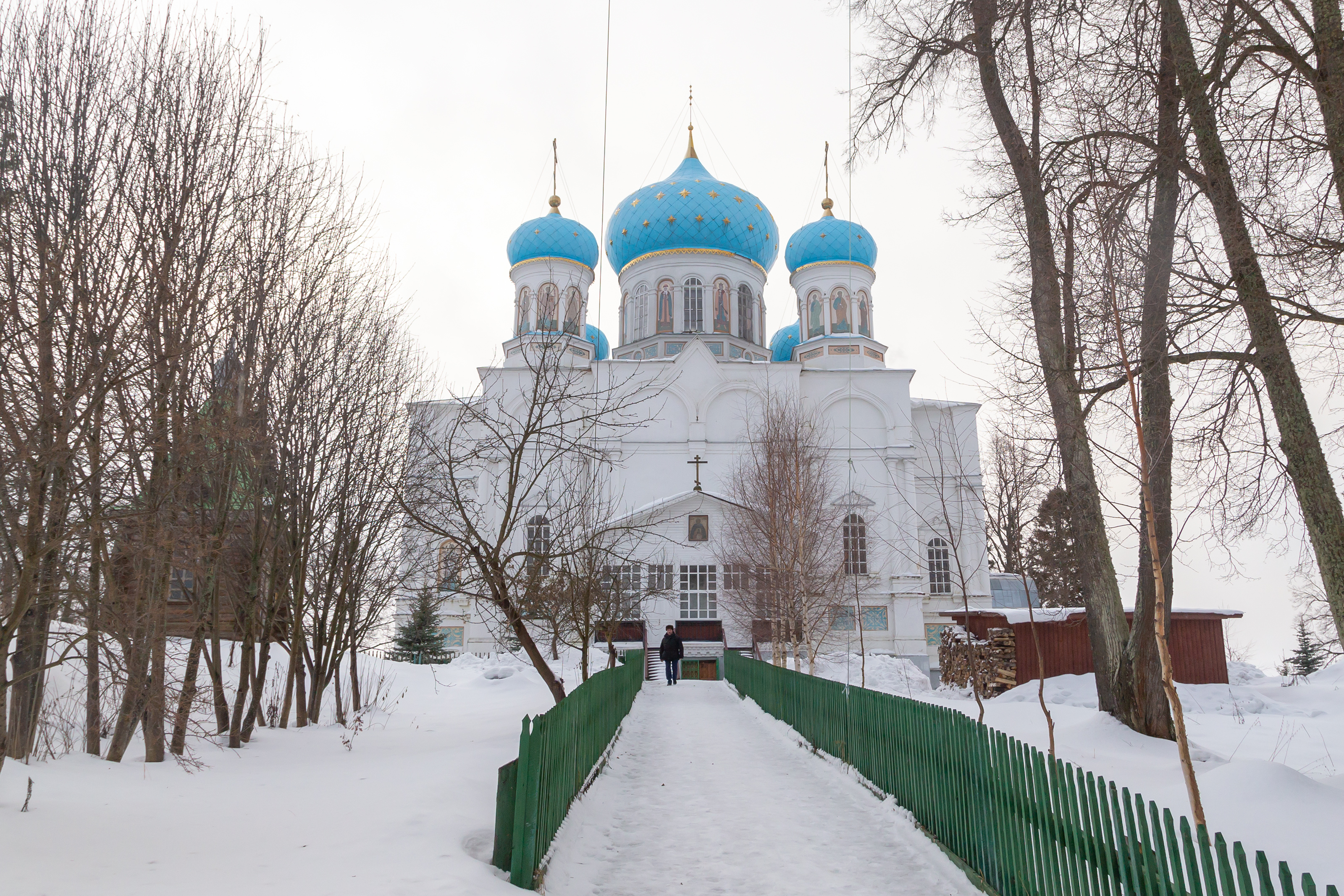
Catholic Church of the Virgin of Galich and Saint Elijah

In 1912, the monastery owned 337 parcels of land where three churches were located. Particularly revered were the relics of Saint Abraham of Galich, a miraculous icon of the Virgin of Galich, and an icon of Saint Abraham with his penitential chains. The remains of Princess Elena Dolgoruky and members of the Lermontov family and the Mamaev family were buried in the monastery cemetery.

=== Soviet era ===
The monastery was deprived of its legal personality in 1919 by the new communist power; but Archimandrite Serapion succeeded with the brothers in registering the monastic community as a parish community. In the spring of 1922, all valuable liturgical objects, icons, gold and precious tableware, etc. were removed and confiscated. The Chukhlomskoy Uyezd thus became the first in the Kostroma governorate to own the most gold and silver.

In the mid-1920s, the authorities set up an orphanage (closed in the mid-1930s) in part of the monastery, which was the pretext for the final closure of the monastery and the expulsion of the monks in 1928, in order according to statements authorities “not to corrupt the souls of children”. Finally in the mid-1930s, all the monks were shot. In the buildings of the old monastery, village clubs were set up, the chapel was given for the use of a peasant woman to build her isba . Later, the local authorities planned to turn the premises into a holiday home for workers from the surrounding area. The old churches are transformed into granaries. A tractor and agricultural machinery station is organized within its walls. It closed in the 1950s. At the end of the 1950s, the former monks' cell building housed a primary school. At the beginning of the 1970s, restoration work began, notably with the help of teams of students from the Moscow Institute of Architecture (MArchI). They were completed in 1975.
