= Onion dome =

Type of roof

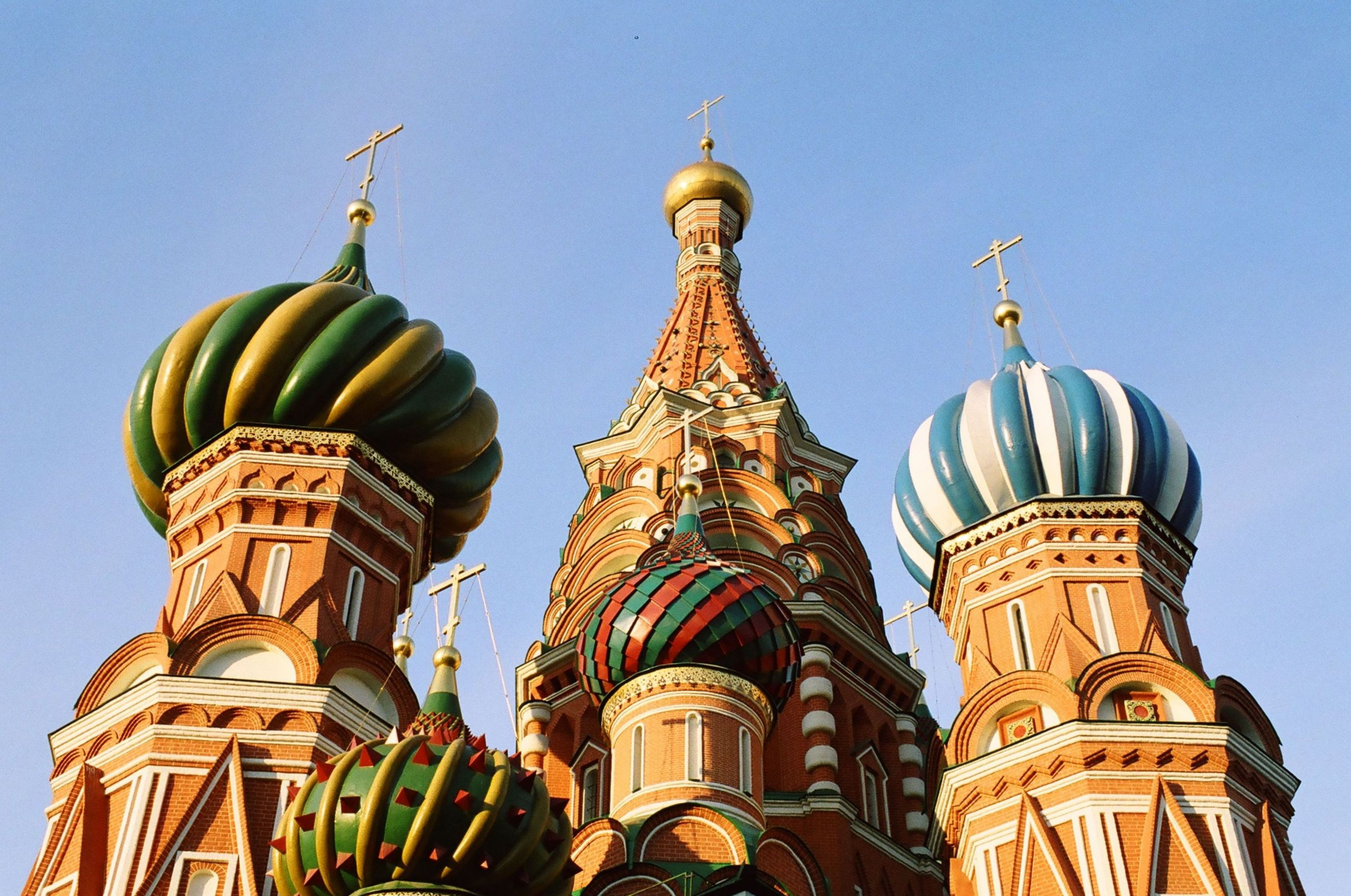
Onion domes of Saint Basil's Cathedral

An onion dome, also known as onion cupola, is a dome whose shape resembles an onion. Such domes are often larger in diameter than the tholobate (drum) upon which they sit, and their height usually exceeds their width. They taper smoothly upwards to a point.

This feature is typically associated with churches belonging to the Russian Orthodox Church although they also persist in the rest of Eastern Europe and occasionally in Western Europe: Bavaria (Germany), Austria, and northeastern Italy. Buildings with onion domes are also found in parts of Central Asia, South Asia, and the Middle East.

Other types of Eastern Orthodox cupolas include helmet domes (such as those of the Dormition Cathedral in Vladimir), Ukrainian pear domes (St. Sophia Cathedral in Kyiv), and Baroque bud domes (St. Andrew's Church in Kyiv) or an onion-helmet mixture (St. Sophia Cathedral in Novgorod).

== History ==
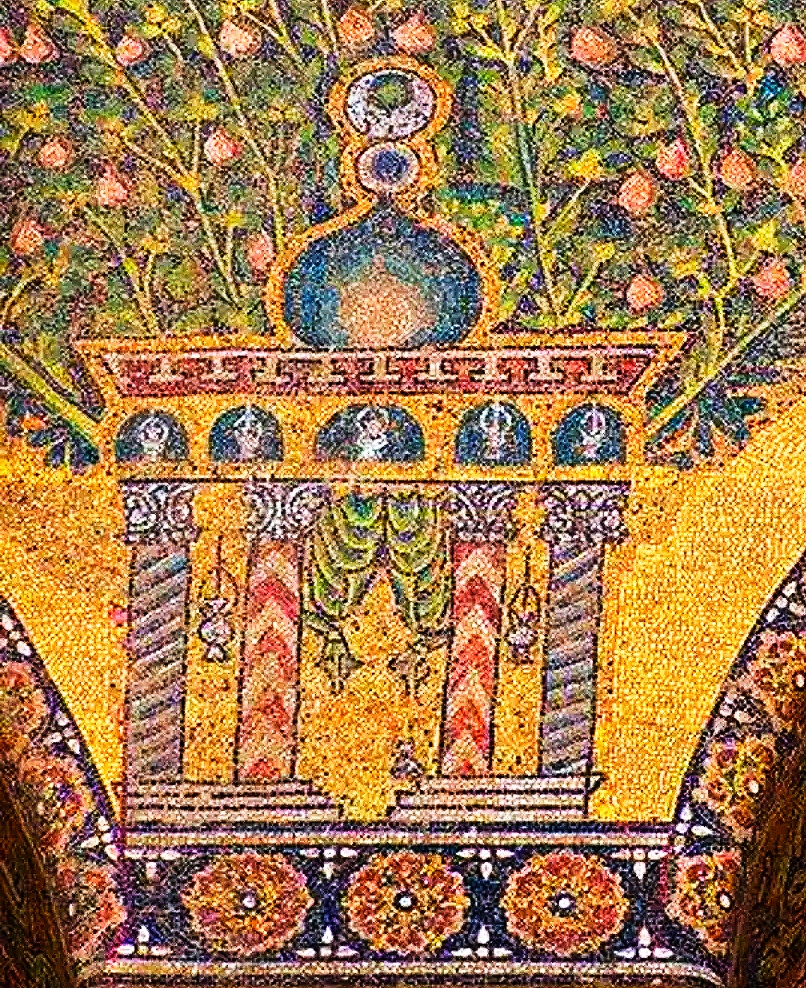
Umayyad mosaic showing a building with an onion dome-like appearance

According to the historian Wolfgang Born, the onion dome has its origin in Syria, where some mosaics from the Umayyad Caliphate depict early stages of the development of bulbous domes. An early prototype of onion dome also appeared in Chehel Dokhter, a mid-11th-century Seljuk architecture in the Damghan region of Iran.

It is not completely clear when and why the onion dome gained popularity in Russian architecture, but buildings featuring them appear as early as the 13th century, reaching a peak by the 17th and the 18th centuries, up until the Petrine period. Some suggest they had a decorative advantage over typical Byzantine and helmet dome, while also not gathering as much snow during severe winters. The largest onion domes of that time were erected in areas around Yaroslavl. A number of these had more complicated bud-shaped domes, whose form derived from Baroque models of the late 17th century. Pear-shaped domes are usually associated with Ukrainian Baroque, and cone-shaped domes are typical for Orthodox churches of Transcaucasia.

Later, the Moors also brought the design to Spain, and Islamic influence in the 17th century may have been responsible for its introduction in Vienna, where it can be seen on many Baroque structures. Throughout Austria and Bavaria, onion domes top innumerable small churches.

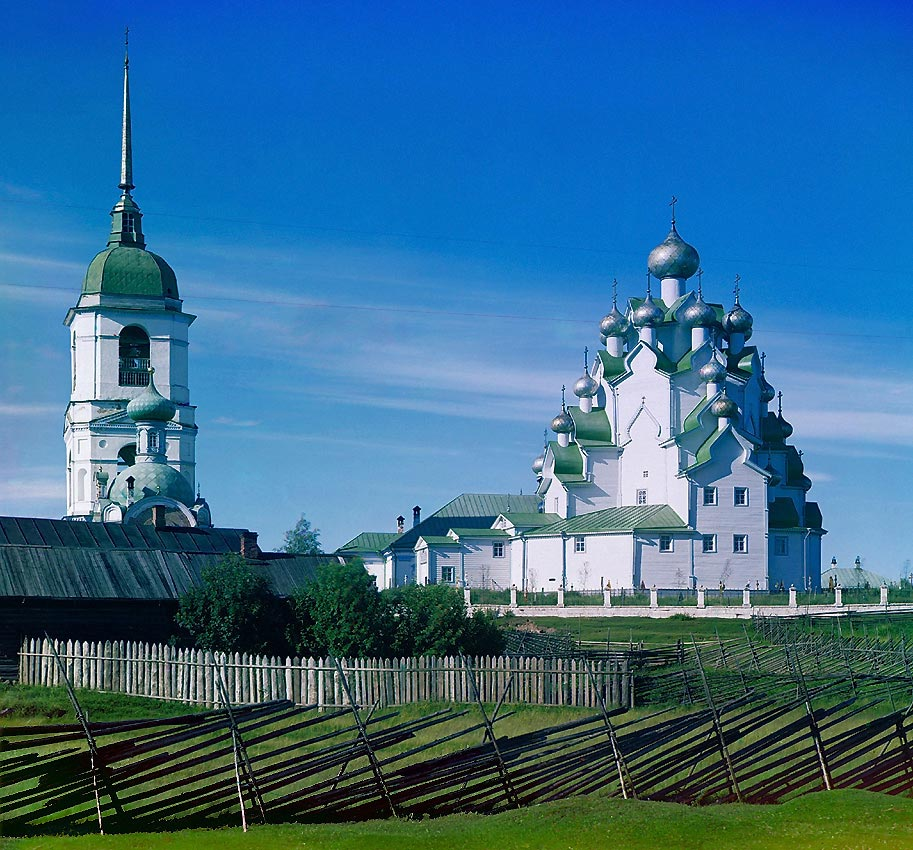
Wooden churches in Kizhi and Vytegra have as many as twenty-five onion domes

Some scholars suggest that onion domes first appeared in Russia during the reign of Ivan the Terrible (r. 1533–1584). The domes of Saint Basil's Cathedral have not been altered since the reign of Ivan's son Fyodor I (r. 1584–1598), indicating the presence of onion domes in sixteenth-century Russia. Thus, Russians may have adopted onion domes from Muslim countries, possibly from the Khanate of Kazan, whose conquest in 1552 Ivan the Terrible commemorated by erecting St. Basil's Cathedral. Some scholars believe that onion domes first appeared in Russian wooden architecture above tent-like churches. According to this theory, they were strictly utilitarian.

In 1946 Boris Rybakov analysed Russian chronicles and concluded that most of them, from the 13th century onward, feature onion- instead of helmet-shaped domes, suggesting that this style could not have been imported from the Orient, where they did not replace spherical domes until the 15th century Historians like Nikolay Voronin seconded his point of view.

Later, Sergey Zagraevsky surveyed icons and miniatures dating as early as 11th century. He concluded that most icons painted after the Mongol invasion of Rus display only onion domes. The first onion domes were displayed on some pictures of the 12th century. According to him, single icons from the 15th century represented a helmet-dome church. His findings led him to dismiss fragments of those dome types discovered by restorators beneath modern onion domes as post-Petrine stylisations intended to reproduce the familiar forms of Byzantine cupolas, like the rebuilt Assumption Cathedral and the Cathedral of Saint Demetrius in Vladimir. Also, restoration works on several other ancient churches have revealed fragments of former helmet-like domes.

He also indicated that the oldest depictions of the two Vladimir cathedrals represent them as having onion domes prior to their replacement by classicizing helmet domes. He explained the ubiquitous appearance of onion domes in the late 13th century by the general emphasis on verticality characteristic of Russian church architecture from the late 12th to the early 15th centuries. At that time, porches, pilasters, vaults and drums were arranged to create a vertical thrust, to make the church seem taller than it was.

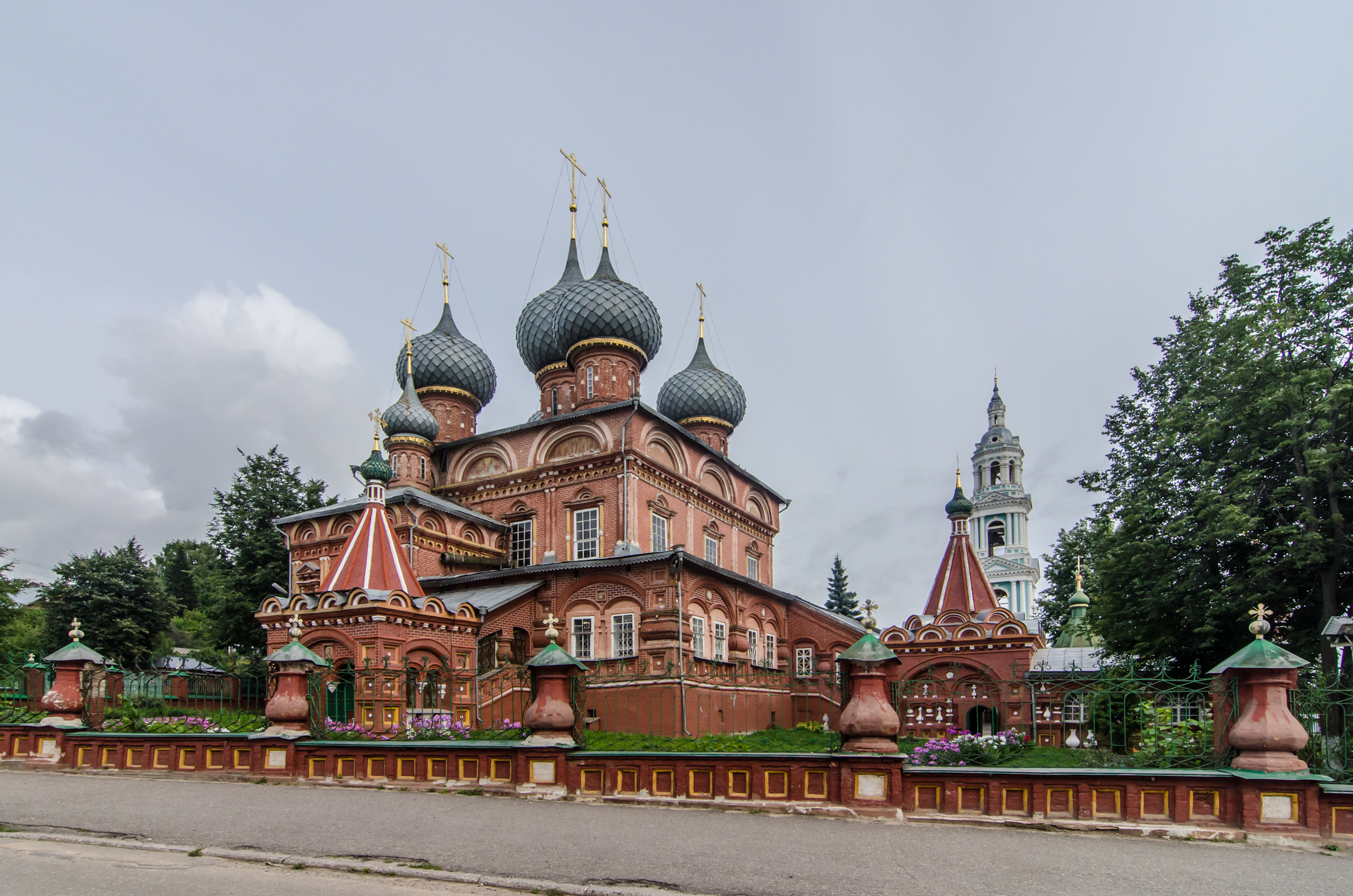
Onion domes at the Church of the Resurrection, Kostroma (1652)

Another consideration proposed by Zagraevsky links the onion-shaped form of Russian domes with the weight of traditional Russian crosses, which are much larger and more elaborate than those used in Byzantium and Kievan Rus. Such ponderous crosses would have been easily toppled if they had not been fixed to sizeable stones traditionally placed inside the elongated domes of Russian churches. It is impossible to place such a stone inside the flat dome of the Byzantine type, which were characterized by broader, flatter domes without a special framework erected above the drum. In contrast to this ancient form, each drum of a Russian church is surmounted by a special structure of metal or timber, which is lined with sheet iron or tiles, and the onion architecture is mostly very curved. Russian architecture used the dome shape not only for churches but also for other buildings.

== Symbolism ==
Prior to the 18th century, the Russian Orthodox Church did not assign any particular symbolism to the exterior shape of a church. Nevertheless, onion domes are popularly believed to symbolise burning candles. In 1917, the religious philosopher Prince Evgenii Troubetzkoy argued that the onion shape of Russian church domes may not be explained rationally. According to Trubetskoy, drums crowned by tapering domes were deliberately scored to resemble candles to show a certain aesthetic and religious attitude:

The Byzantine cupola above the church represents the vault of heaven above the earth. On the other hand, the Gothic spire expresses unbridled vertical thrust, which rises huge masses of stone to the sky. In contrast to these, our native onion dome may be likened to a tongue of fire, crowned by a cross and tapering towards a cross. When we look at the Ivan the Great Bell Tower, we seem to see a gigantic candle burning above Moscow. The Kremlin cathedrals and churches, with their multiple domes, look like huge chandeliers. The onion shape results from the idea of prayer as a soul burning towards heaven, which connects the earthly world with the treasures of the afterlife. Every attempt to explain the onion shape of our church domes by utilitarian considerations (for instance, the need to preclude snow from piling on the roof) fails to account for the most essential point, that of aesthetic significance of onion domes for our religion. Indeed, there are numerous other ways to achieve the same utilitarian result, e.g., spires, steeples, cones. Why, of all these shapes, ancient Russian architecture settled upon the onion dome? Because the aesthetic impression produced by the onion dome matched a certain religious attitude. The meaning of this religious and aesthetic feeling is finely expressed by a folk saying - "glowing with fervour" - when they speak about church domes.

— Evgenii Troubetzkoy

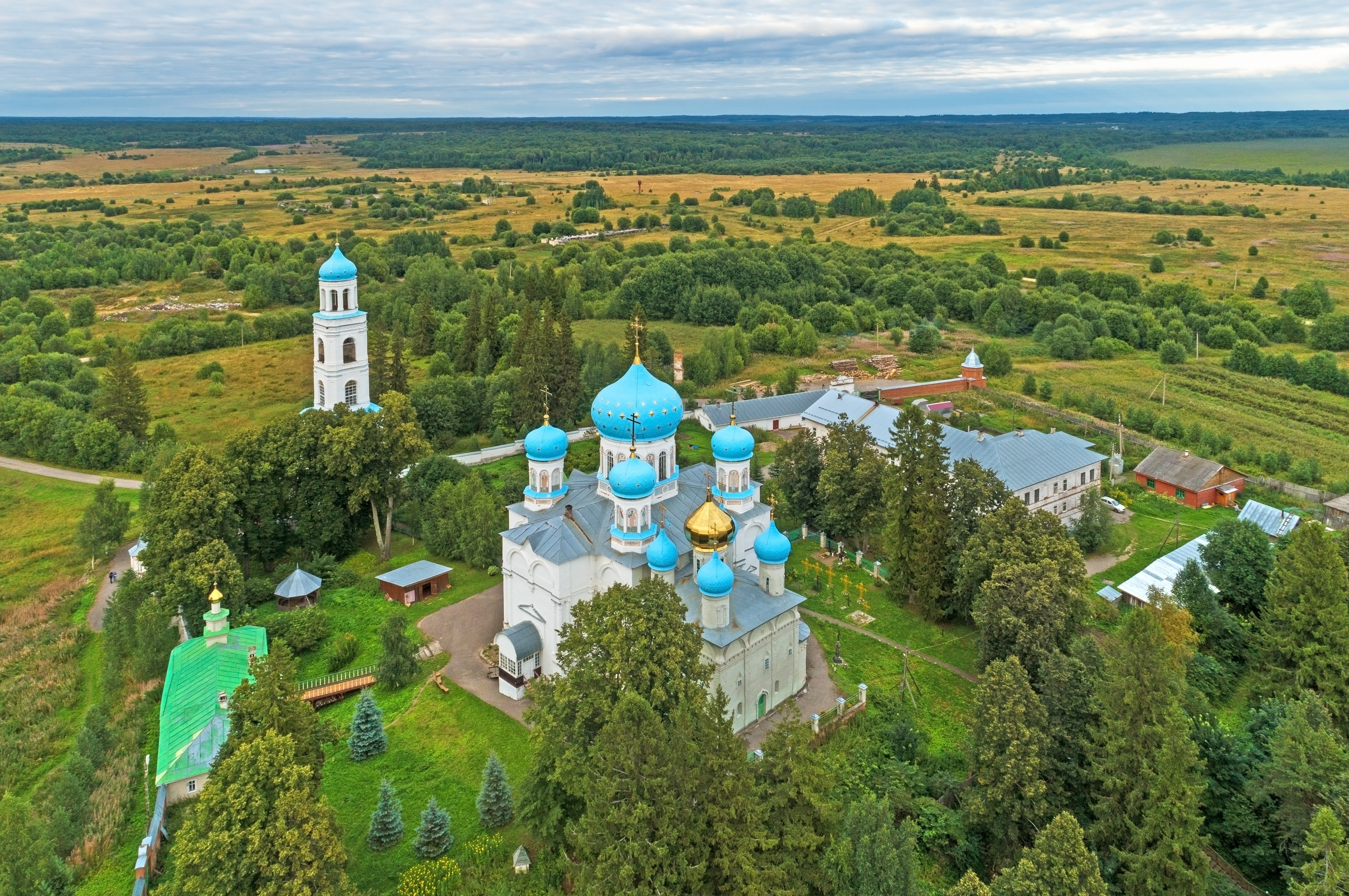
Avraamiev Monastery in Kostroma Oblast, founded in the 14th century

Another explanation has that the onion dome was originally regarded as a form reminiscent of the aedicula (cubiculum) in the Church of the Holy Sepulchre in Jerusalem. The present structure dates back to 12th-century construction by the Crusaders.

== Internationally ==
=== Elsewhere in Europe ===
==== Western and Central regions ====
Baroque domes in the shape of an onion (or other vegetables or flower-buds) were common in the Holy Roman Empire as well. The first one was built in 1576 by the architect Johannes Holl (1512–1594) on the church of the Convent of the Franciscan Sisters of Maria Stern, in Augsburg. Usually made of copper sheet, onion domes appear on Catholic churches all over southern Germany, Switzerland, the Czech Republic, Austria, and Sardinia and northeastern Italy. Onion domes were also a favourite of 20th-century Austrian architectural designer Friedensreich Hundertwasser.

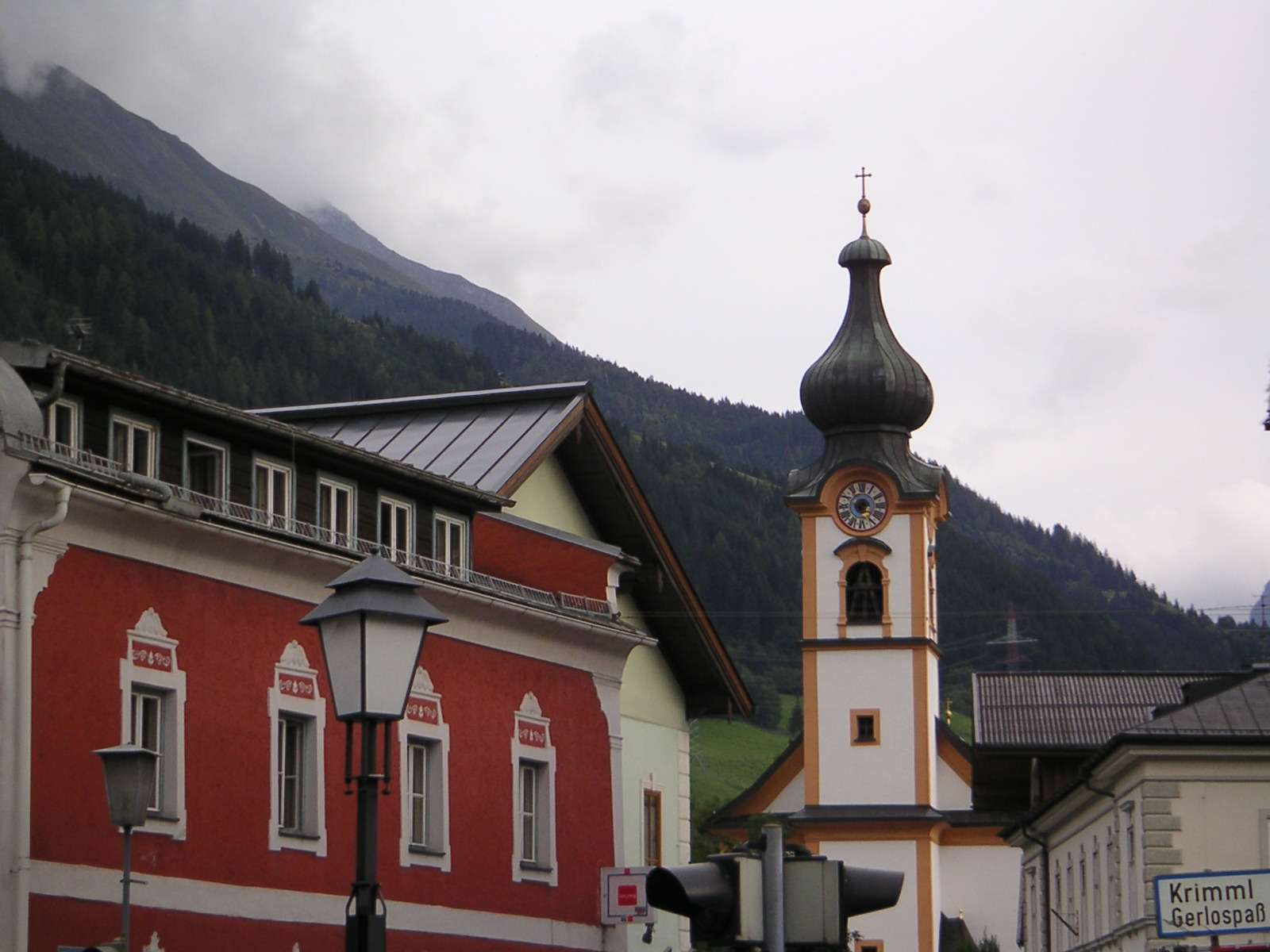
Church of Saint Leonard in Mittersill, Austria

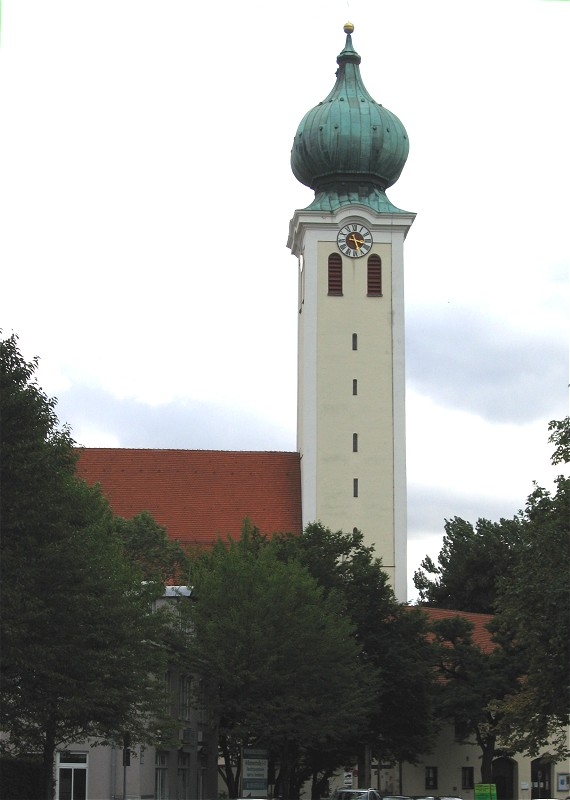
St. Mary's Church in Munich, Germany

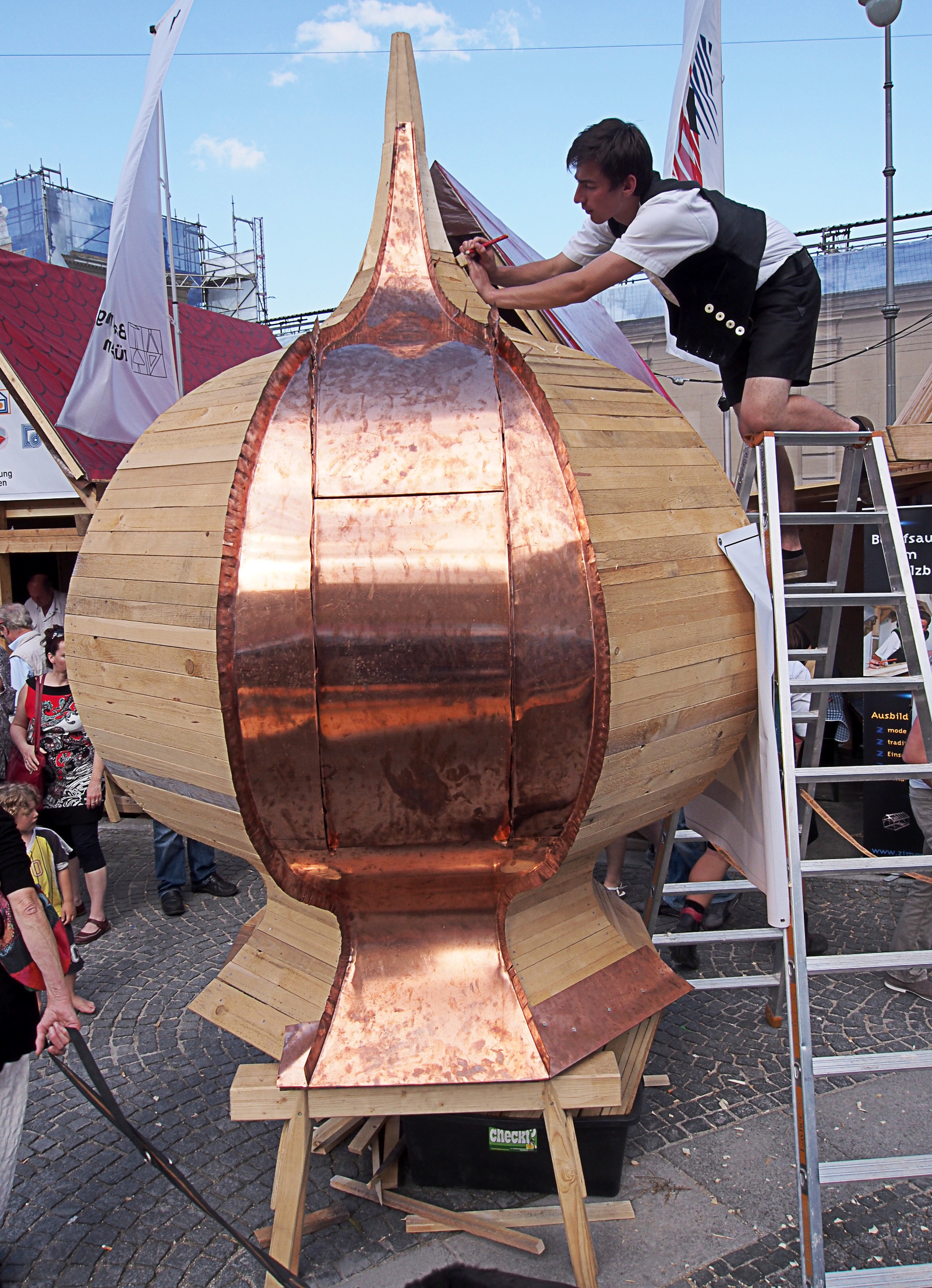
Traditional construction and copper cladding, Munich, Germany

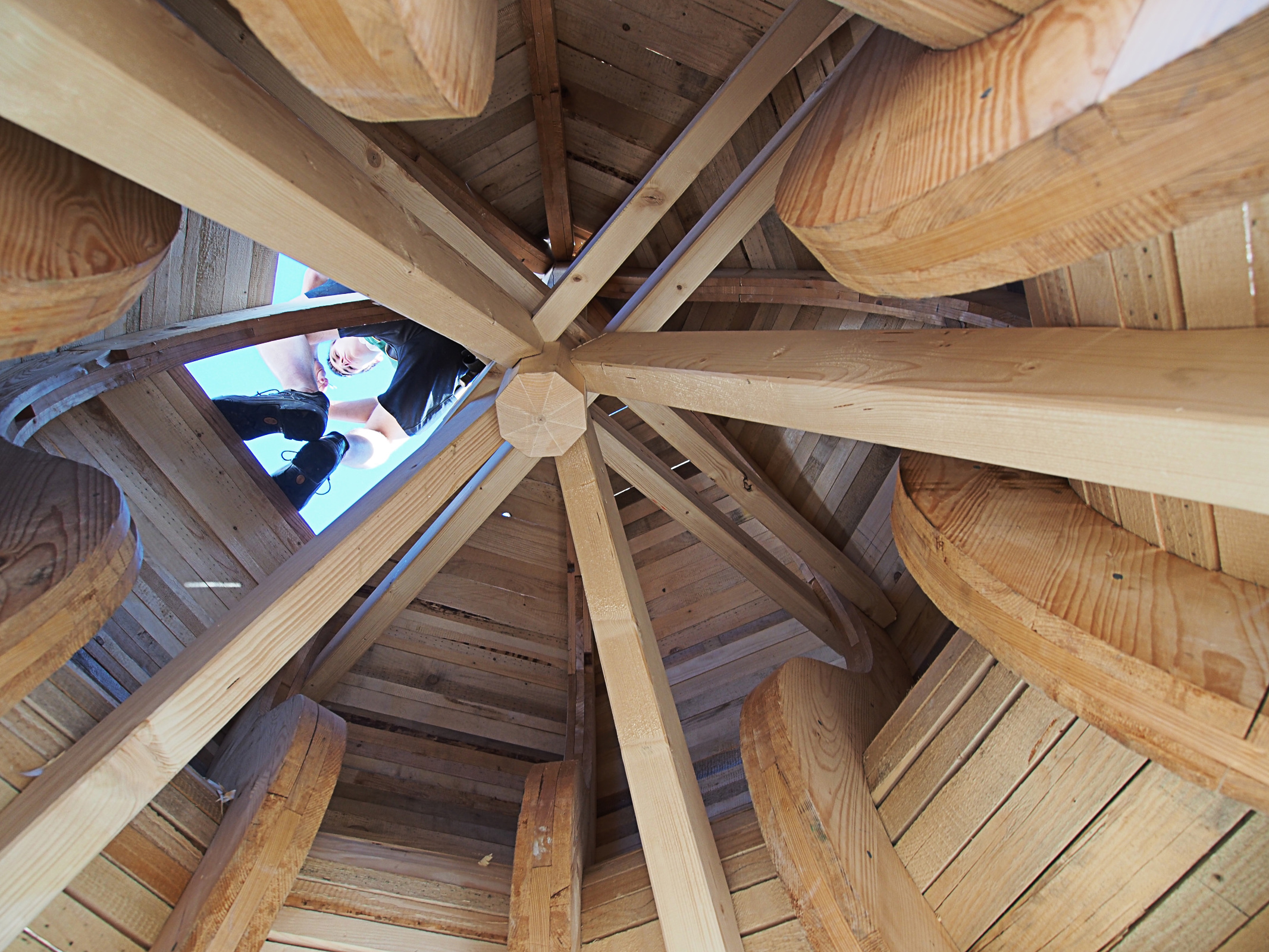
Inside the dome during construction, Munich, Germany

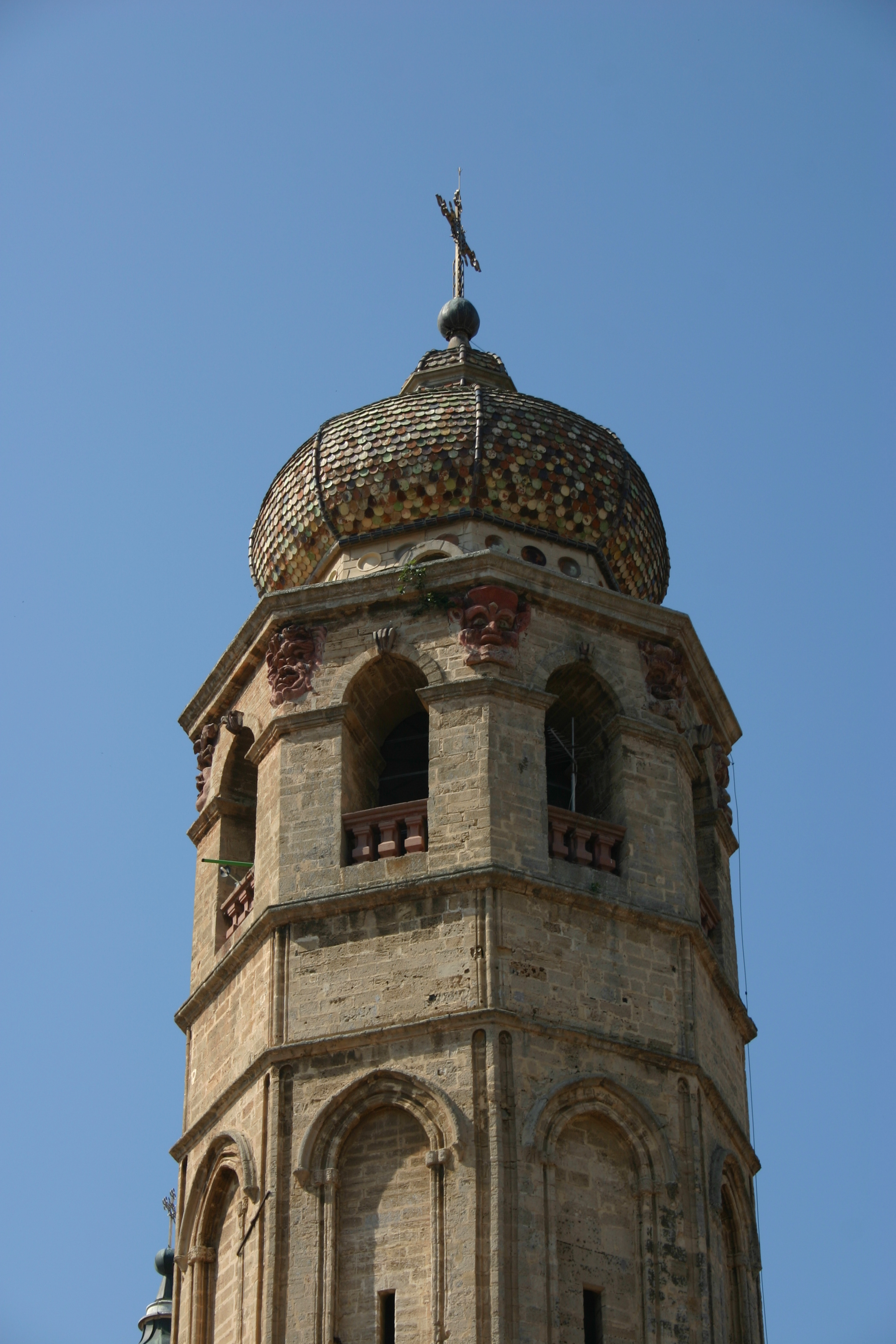
Cupola of Oristano cathedral's bell tower in Sardinia, Italy

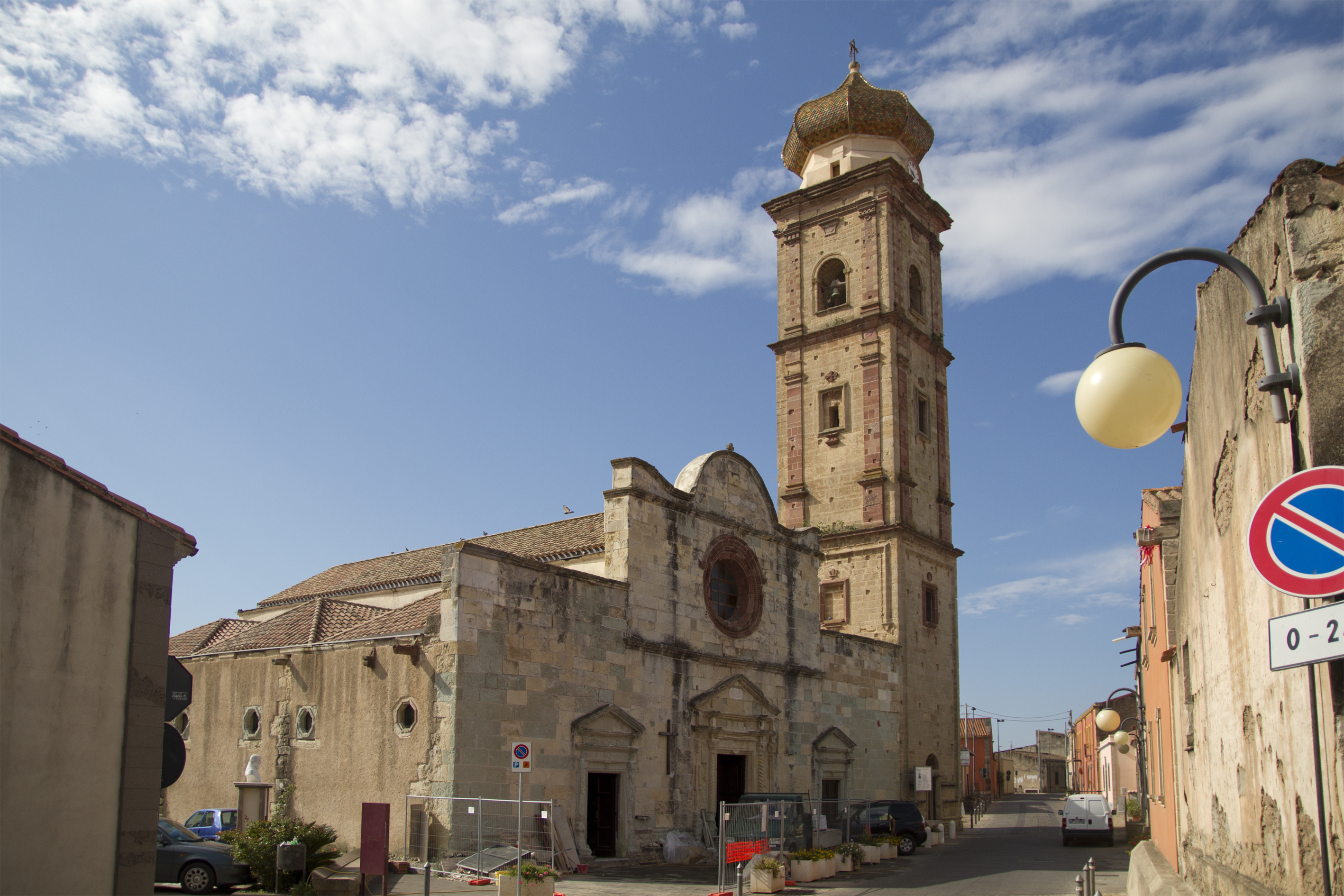
Santa Sofia church in San Vero Milis, Sardinia, Italy

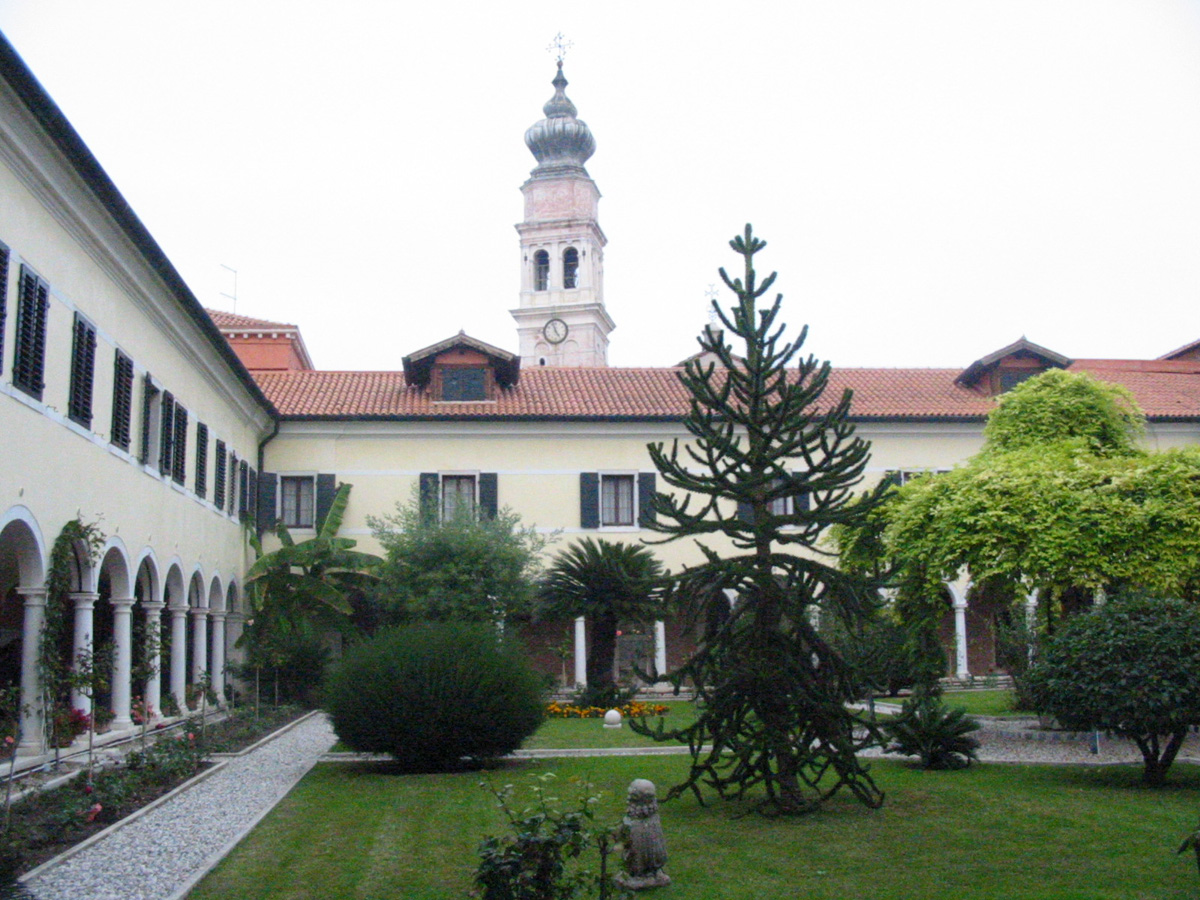
San Lazzaro degli Armeni from Venice, Italy

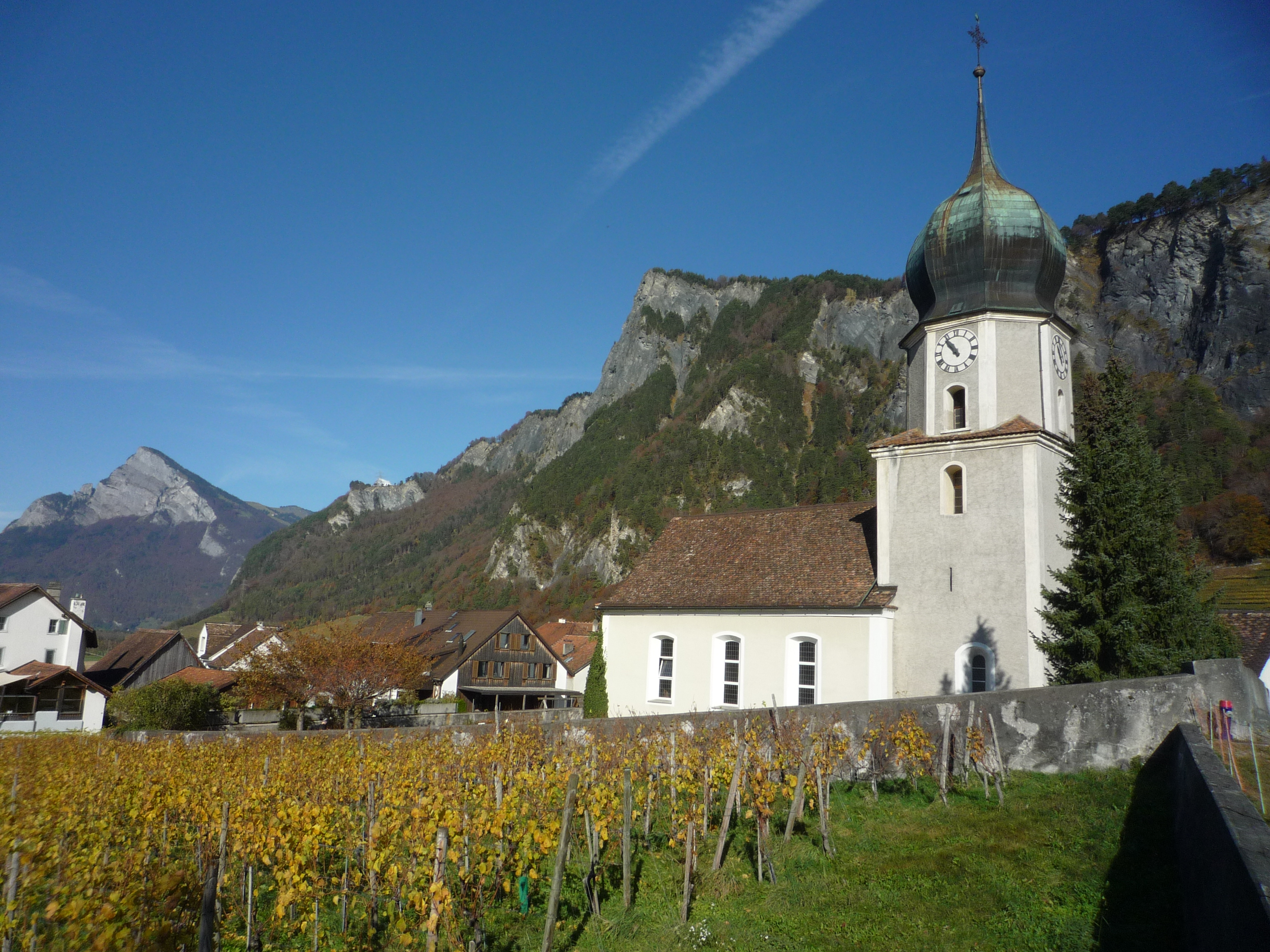
Church of St. Amandus in Fläsch, Switzerland

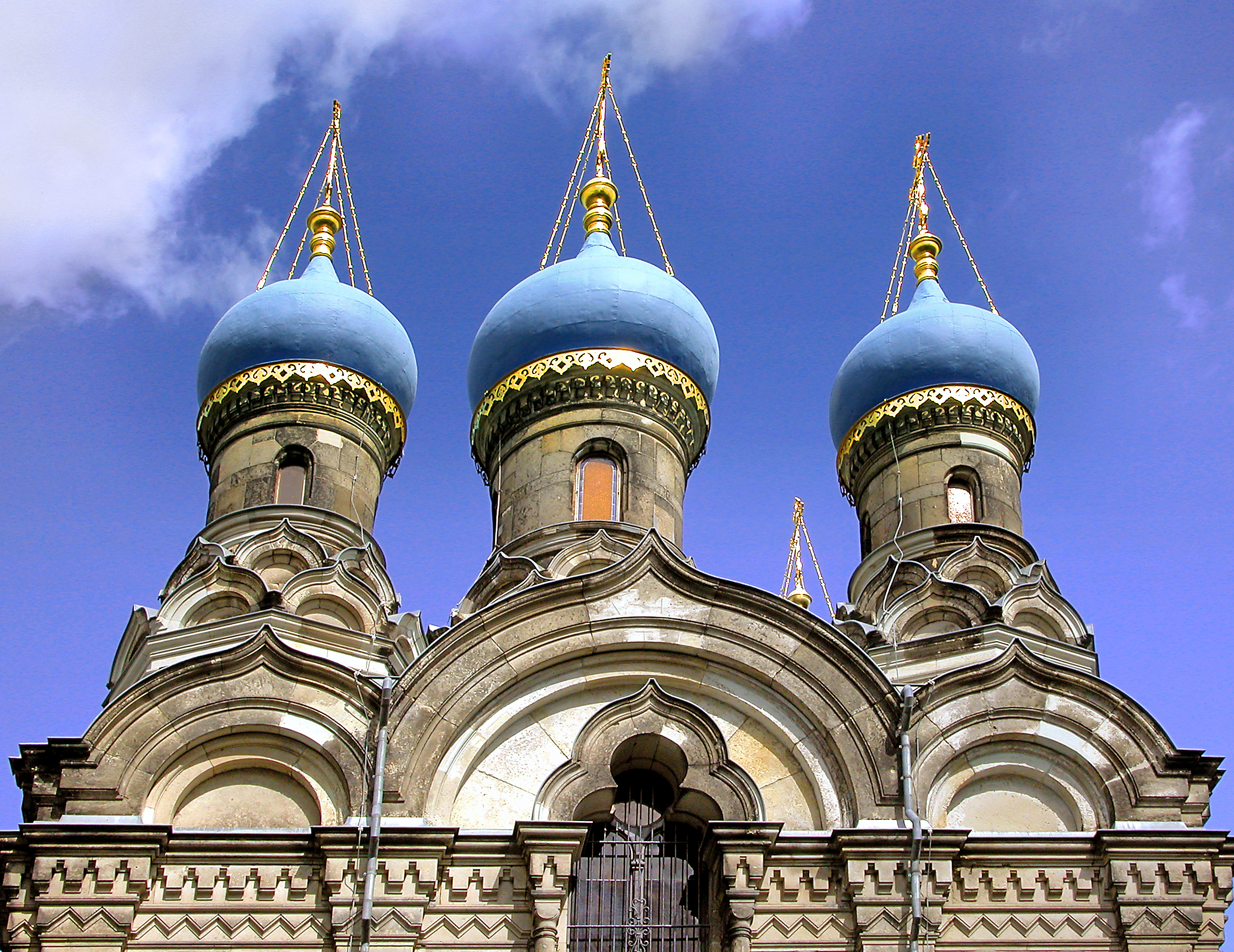
Group of three blue domes at the St. Simeon of the Wonderful Mountain Church in Dresden, Germany

==== Southern and Balkan countries ====
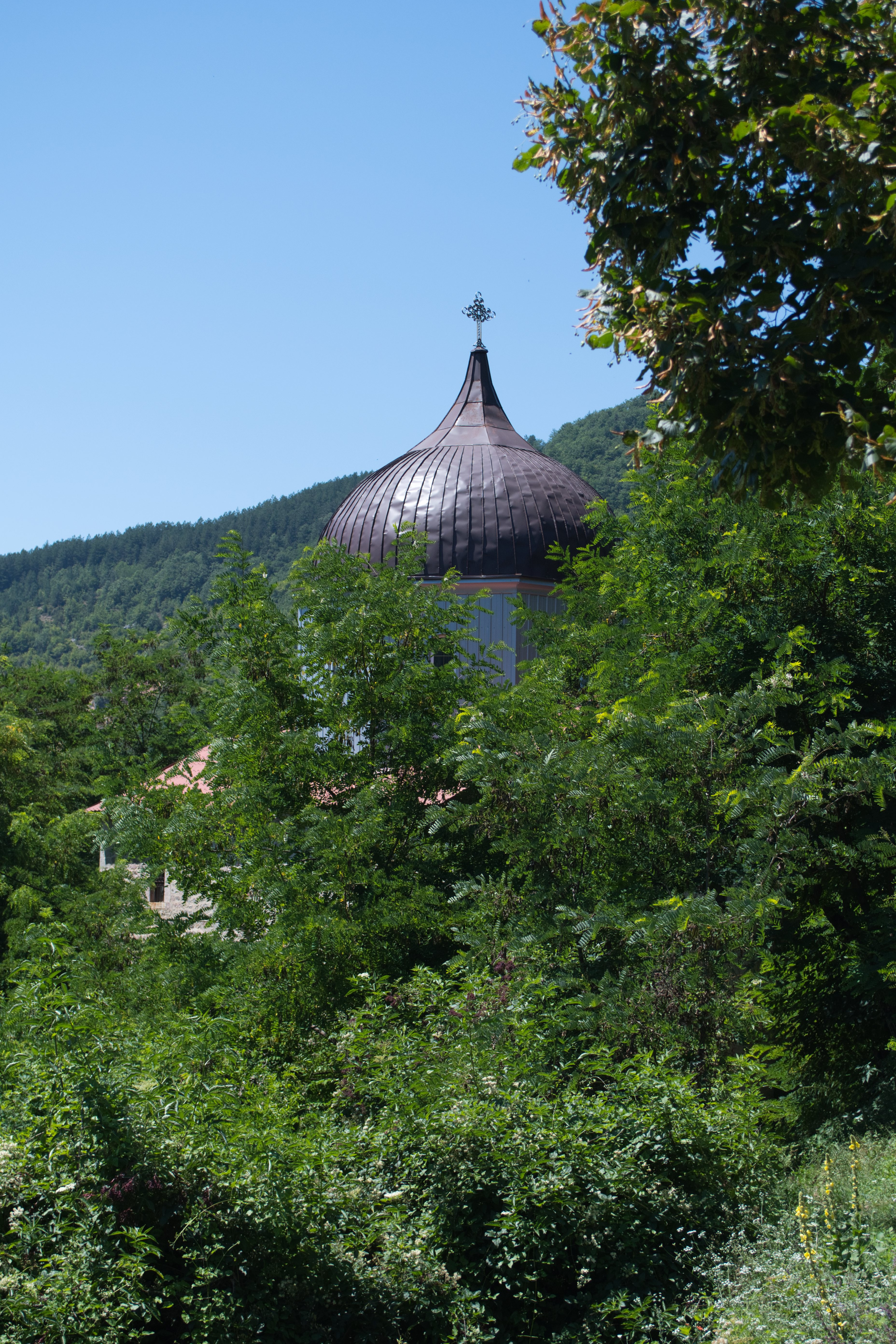
Cupola of St. Athanasius Church in Selci (North Macedonia)

=== Asia ===
==== South Asia ====
The onion dome was also used extensively in Mughal architecture, which later went on to influence Indo-Saracenic architecture. It is also a common feature in Sikh architecture, particularly in Gurudwaras, and sometimes seen in Rajput architecture as well.

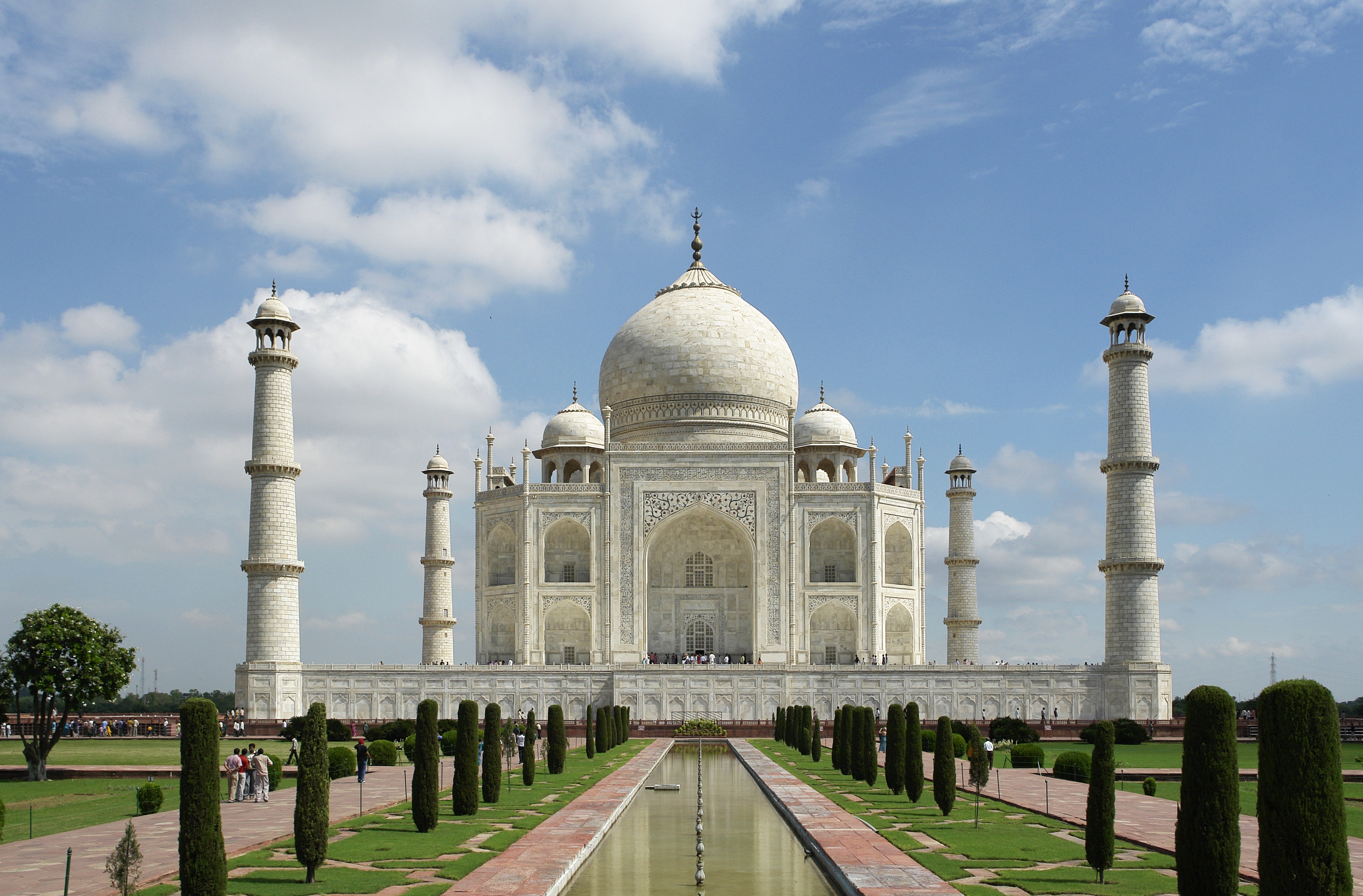
The Taj Mahal in Agra, India, is the most famous example of Mughal architecture, featuring onion domes.

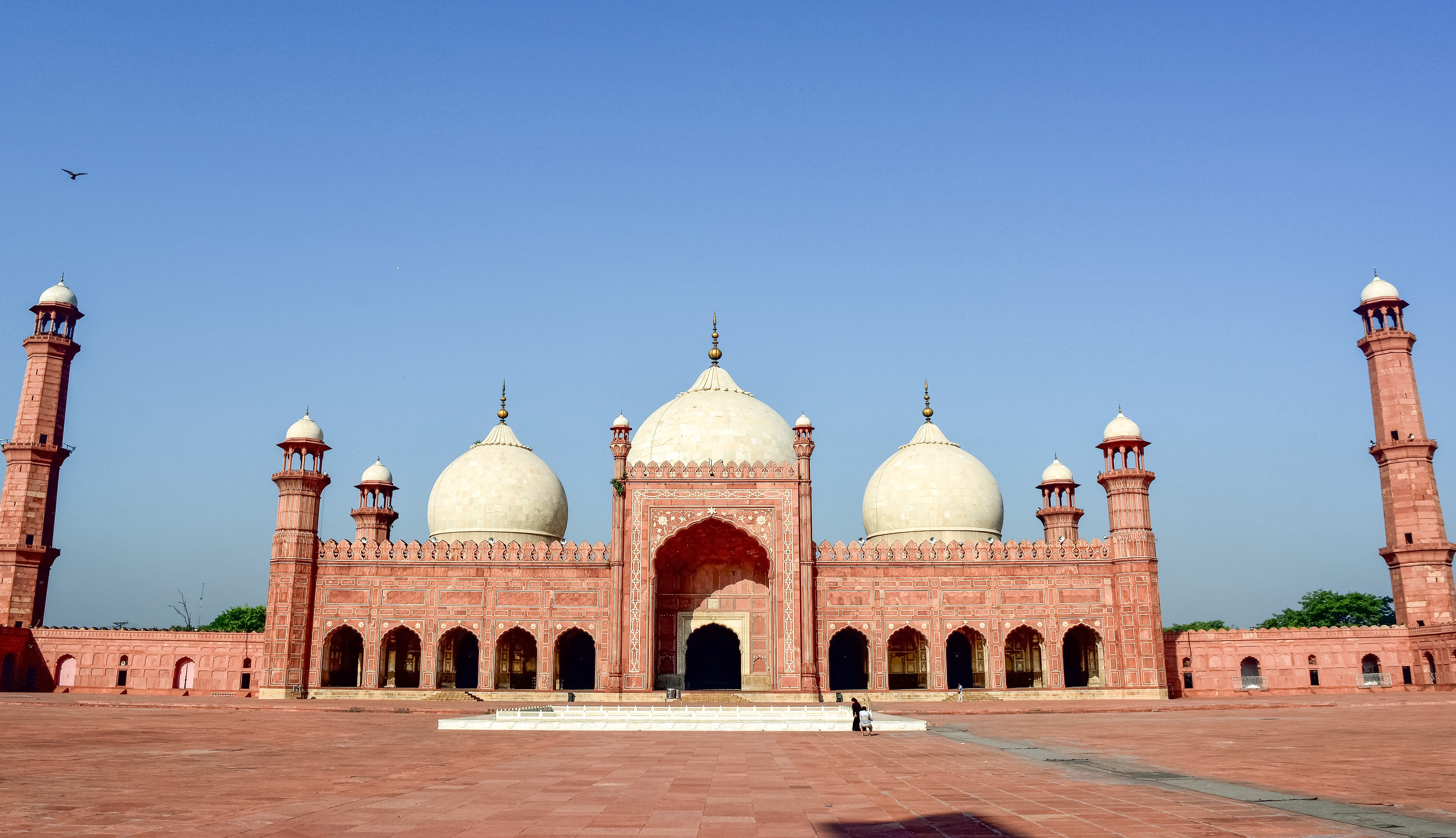
Badshahi Mosque in Lahore, Punjab, Pakistan

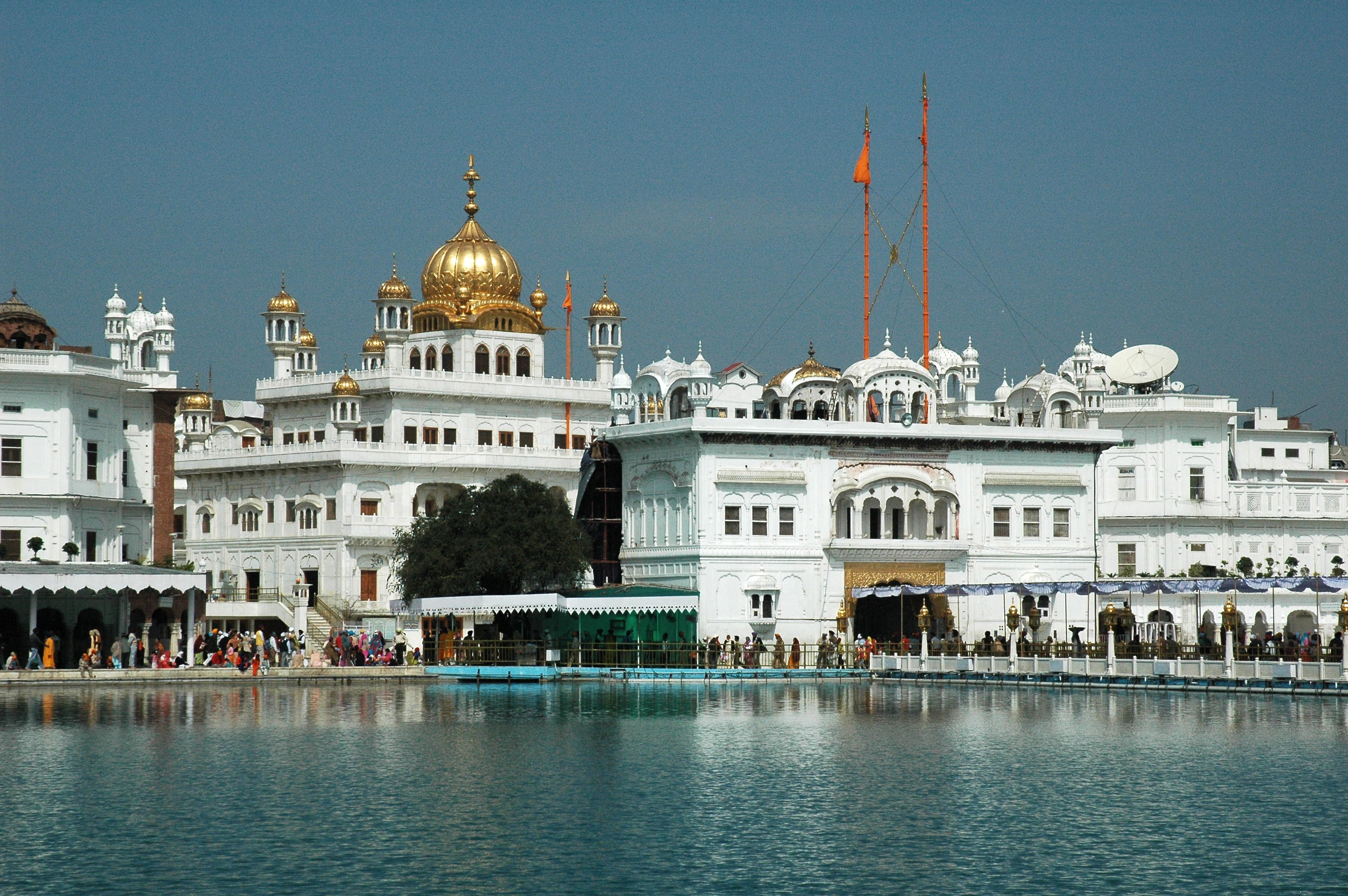
Gilded onion domes of the Akal Takht in Amritsar, Punjab, India

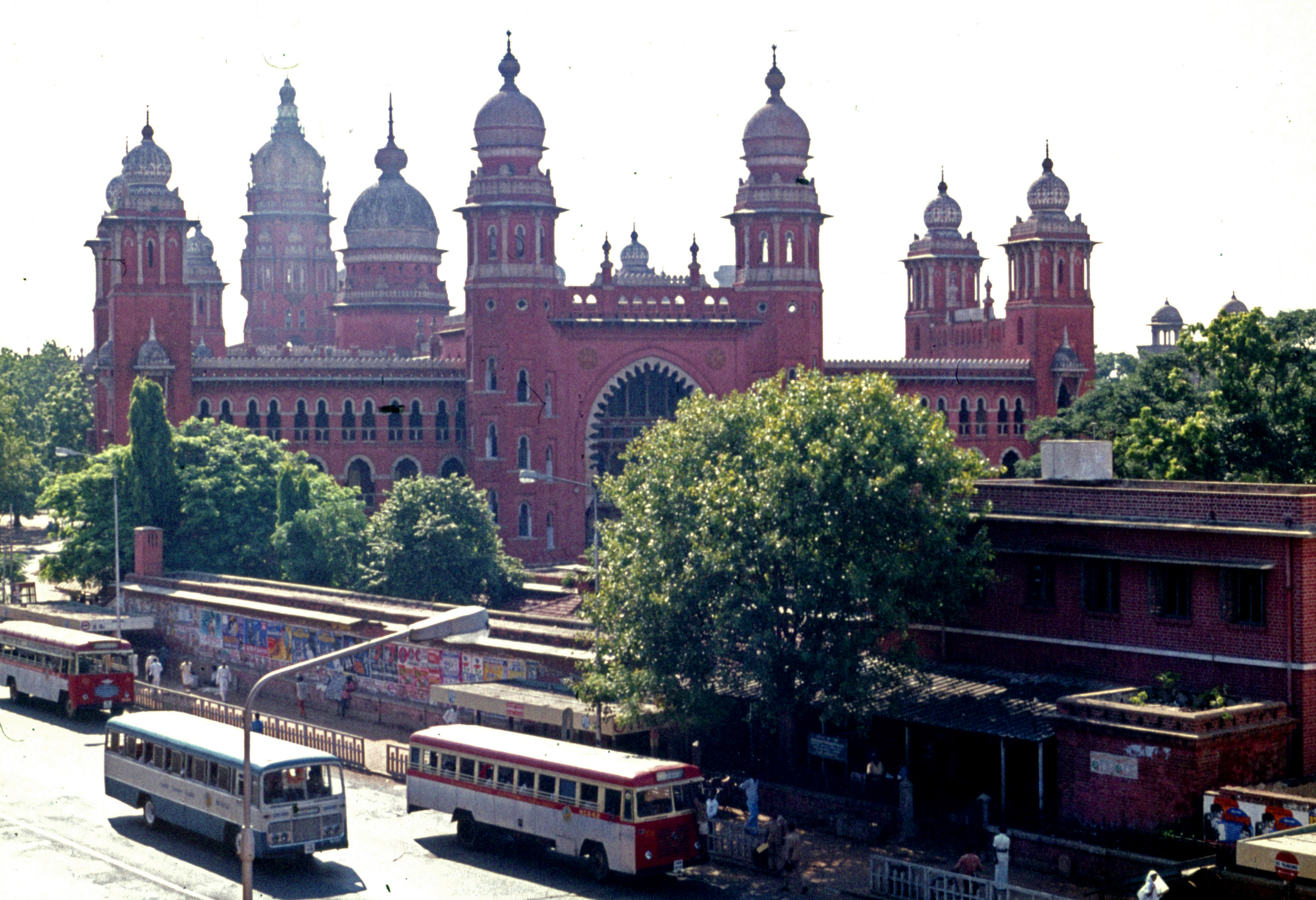
Madras High Court, an example of Indo-Saracenic architecture in Chennai, Tamil Nadu, India

==== Middle East and East Asia ====
Outside the Indian subcontinent, it is also used in Iran and other places in the Middle East and Central Asia. In the late 19th century, the Dutch-built Baiturrahman Grand Mosque in Banda Aceh, Aceh, Indonesia, which incorporated onion shaped dome. The shape of the dome has been used in numerous mosques in Indonesia since then.

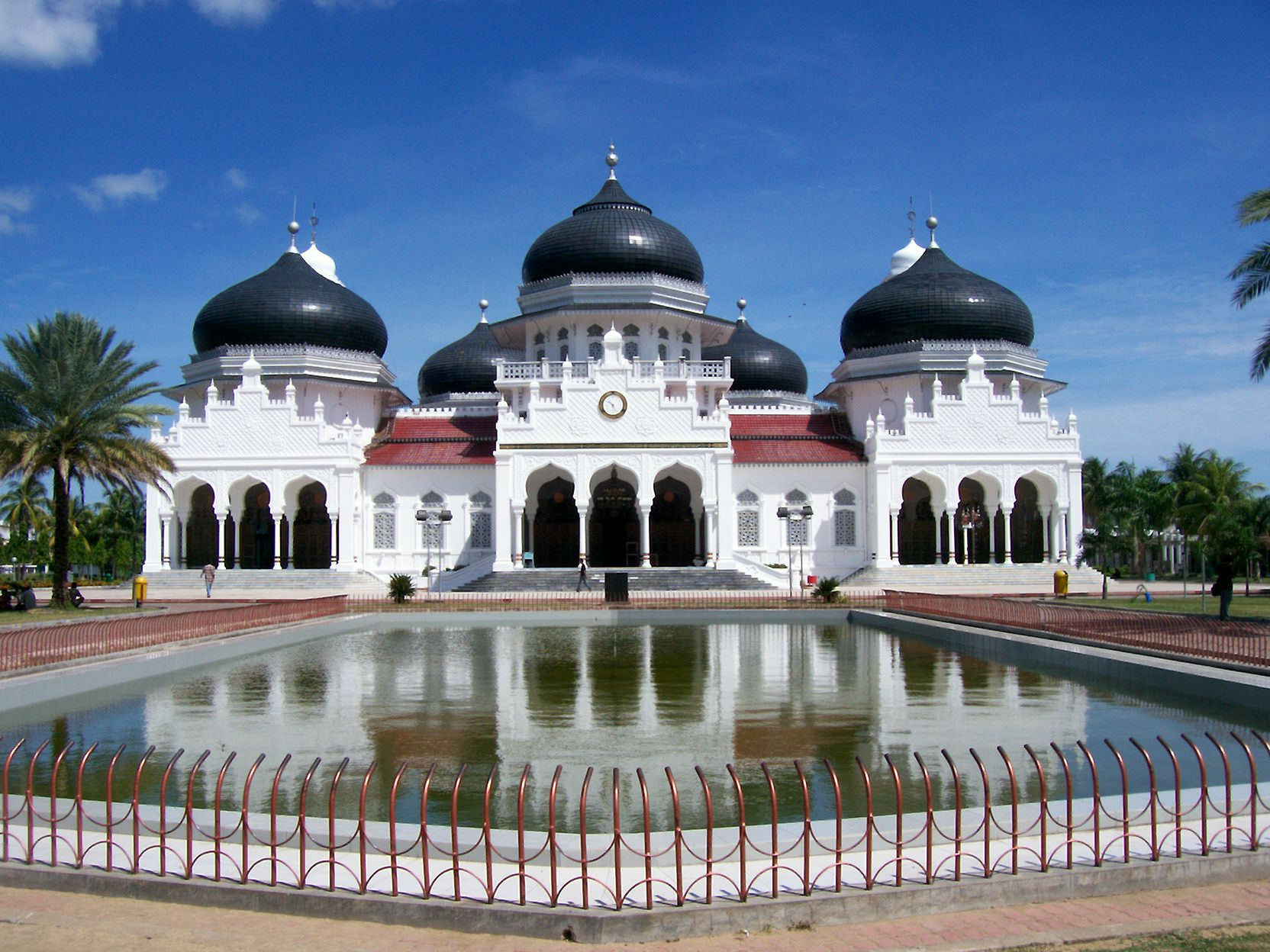
Baiturrahman Grand Mosque from Banda Aceh, Aceh, Indonesia

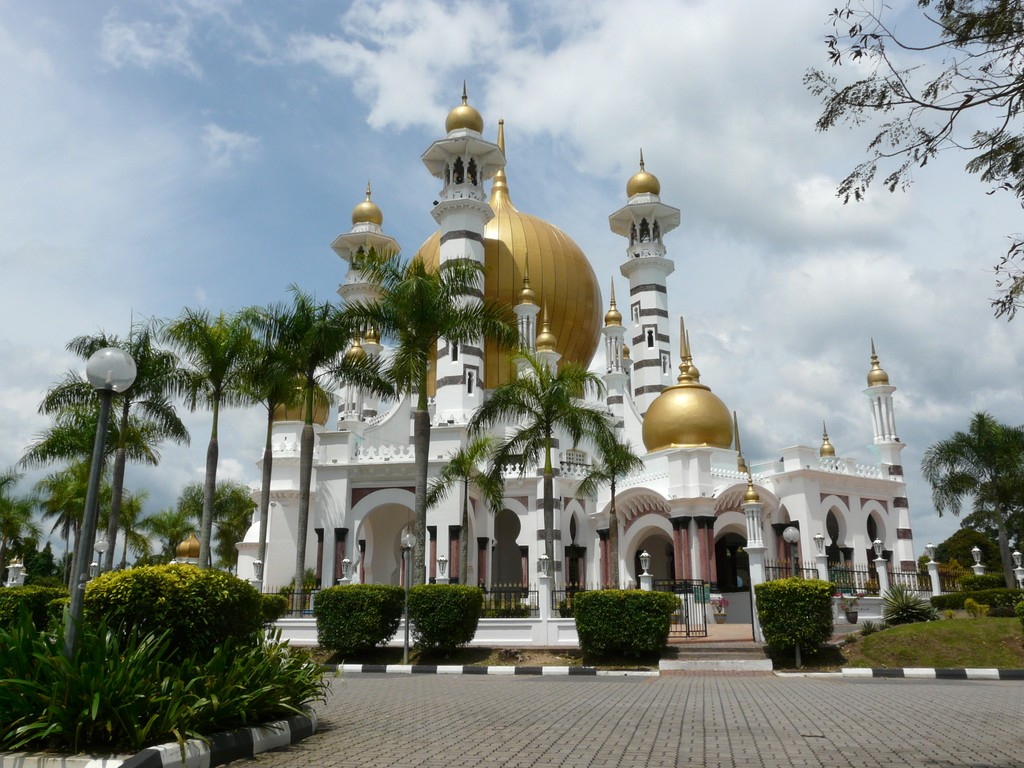
Ubudiah Mosque in Kuala Kangsar, Perak, Malaysia

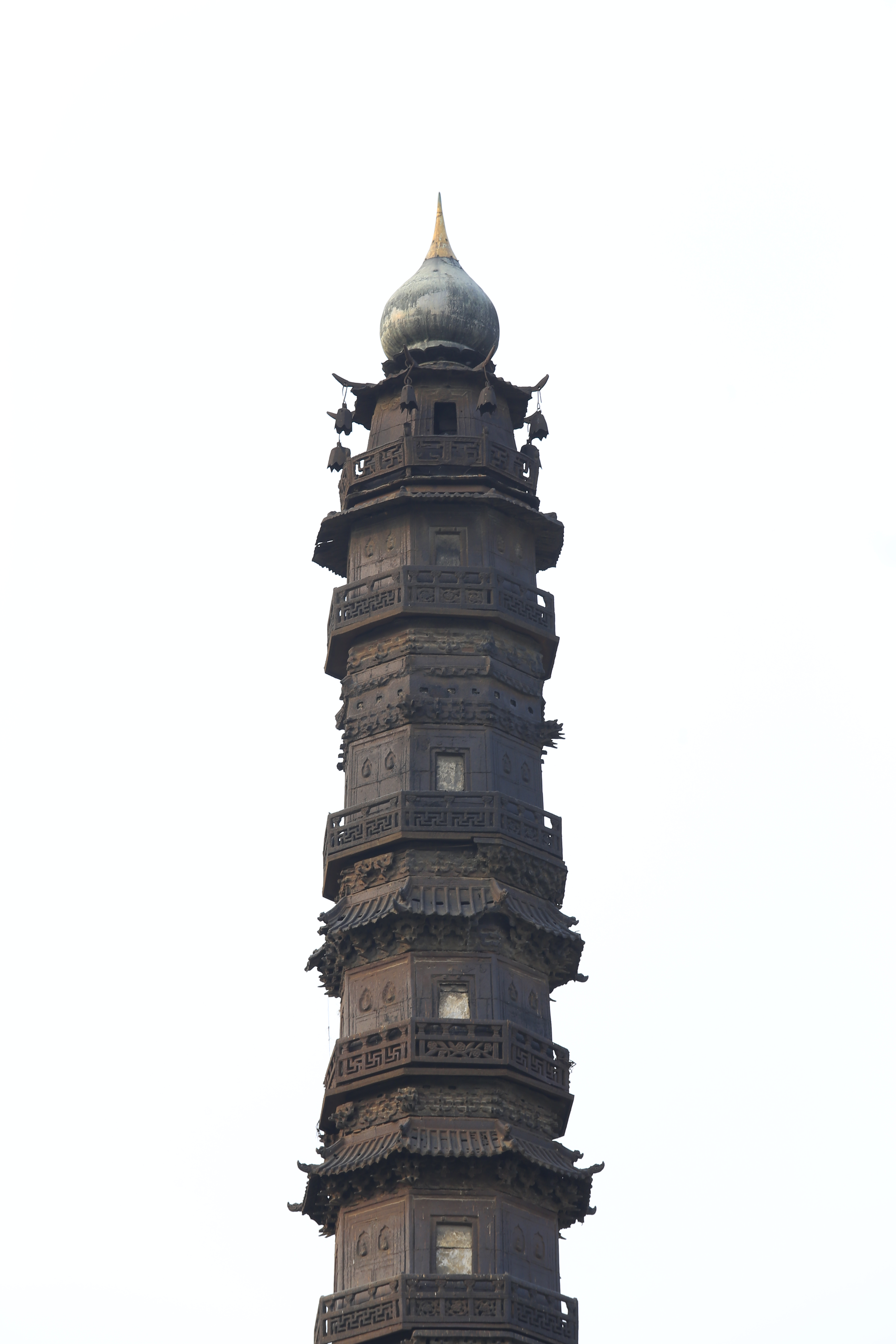
Pagoda of Chongjue Temple in Shandong, China

=== Americas ===
The World's Only Corn Palace, a tourist attraction and basketball arena in Mitchell, South Dakota, also features onion domes on the roof of the structure.

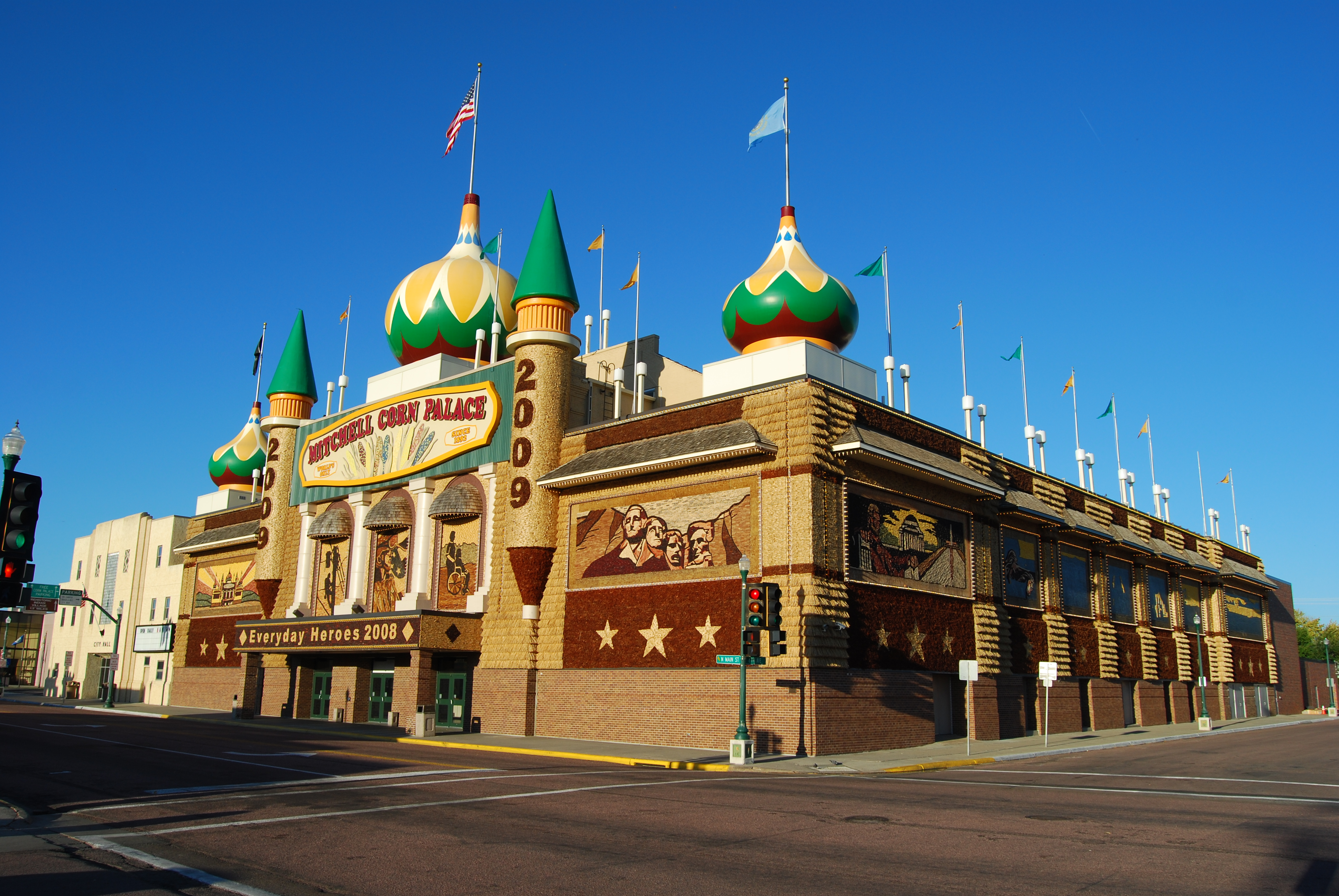
World's Only Corn Palace in Mitchell (South Dakota, USA)

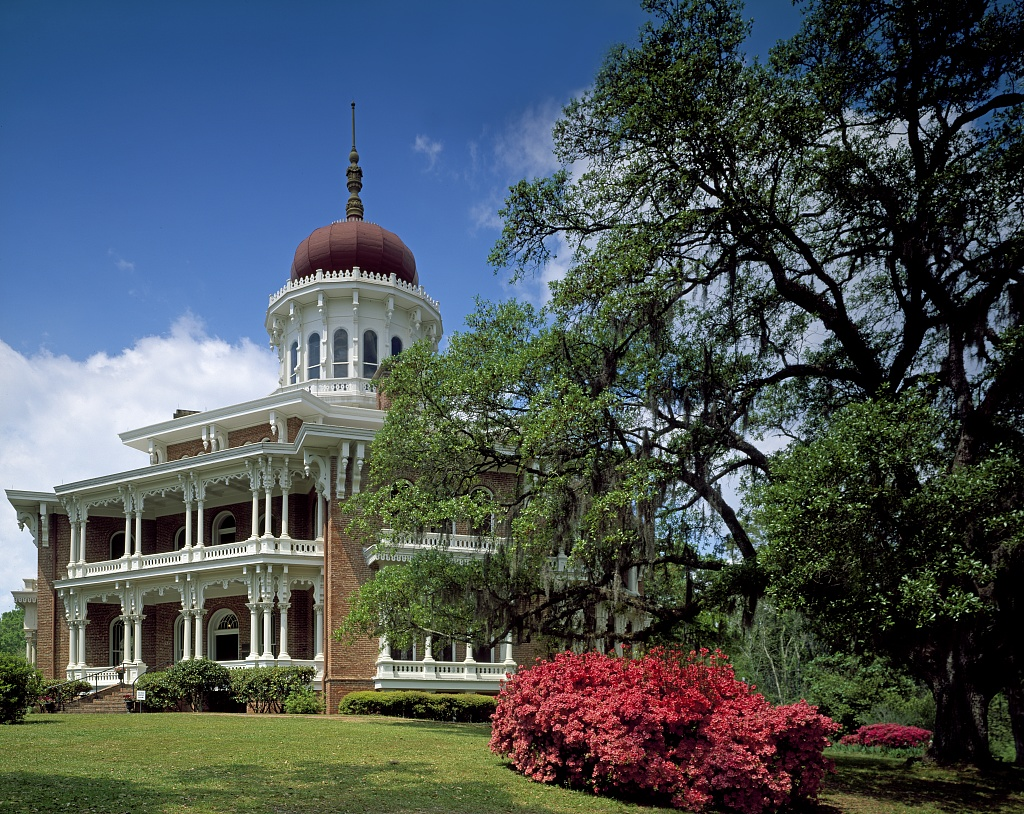
Longwood, in Natchez (Mississippi, USA)

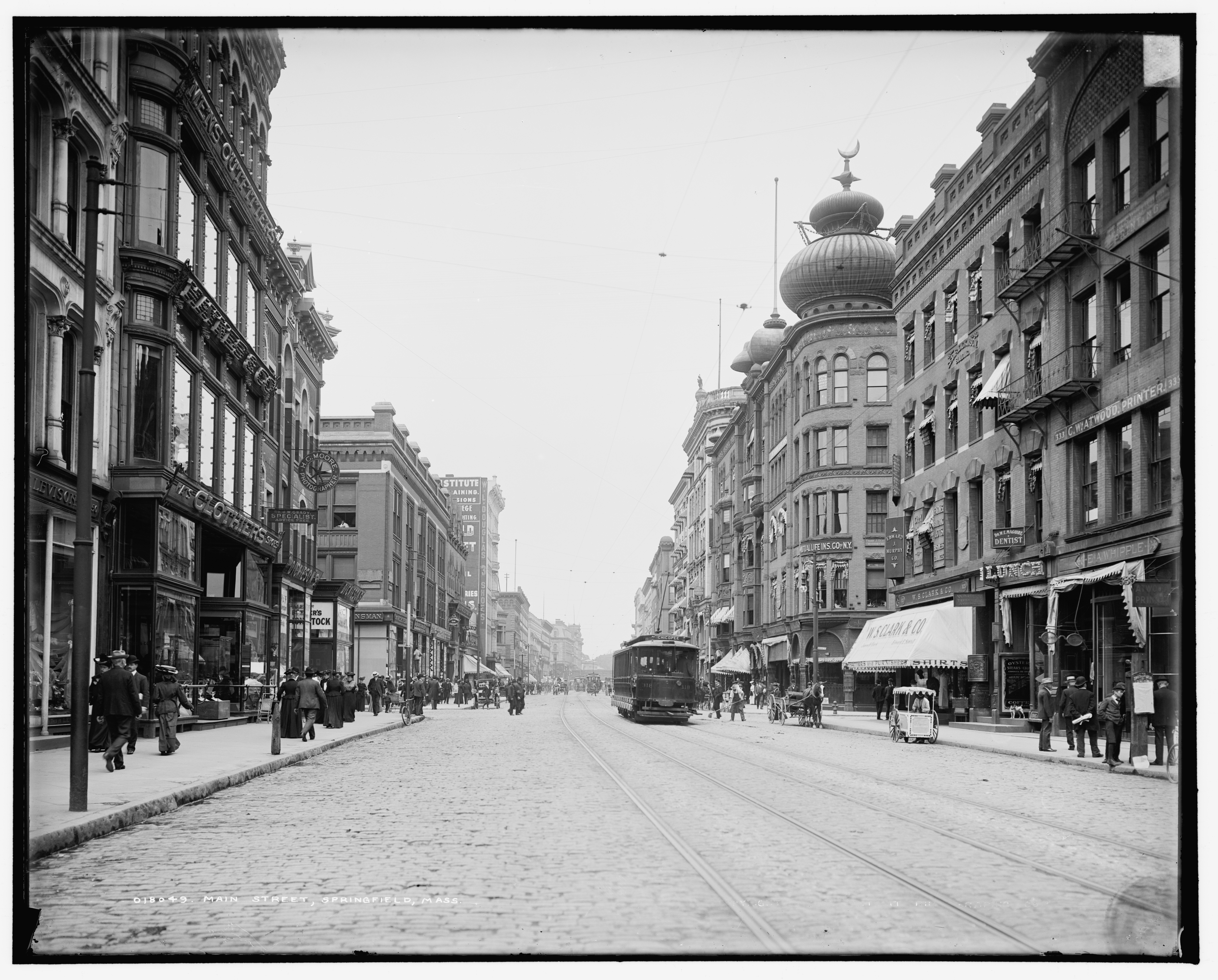
Fuller Block in Springfield (Massachusetts, USA), domes since removed

== See also ==
- List of roof shapes
- Giboshi
- Ogee
