= Chukhloma =

Town in Kostroma Oblast, Russia

Chukhloma Чухлома
- Town
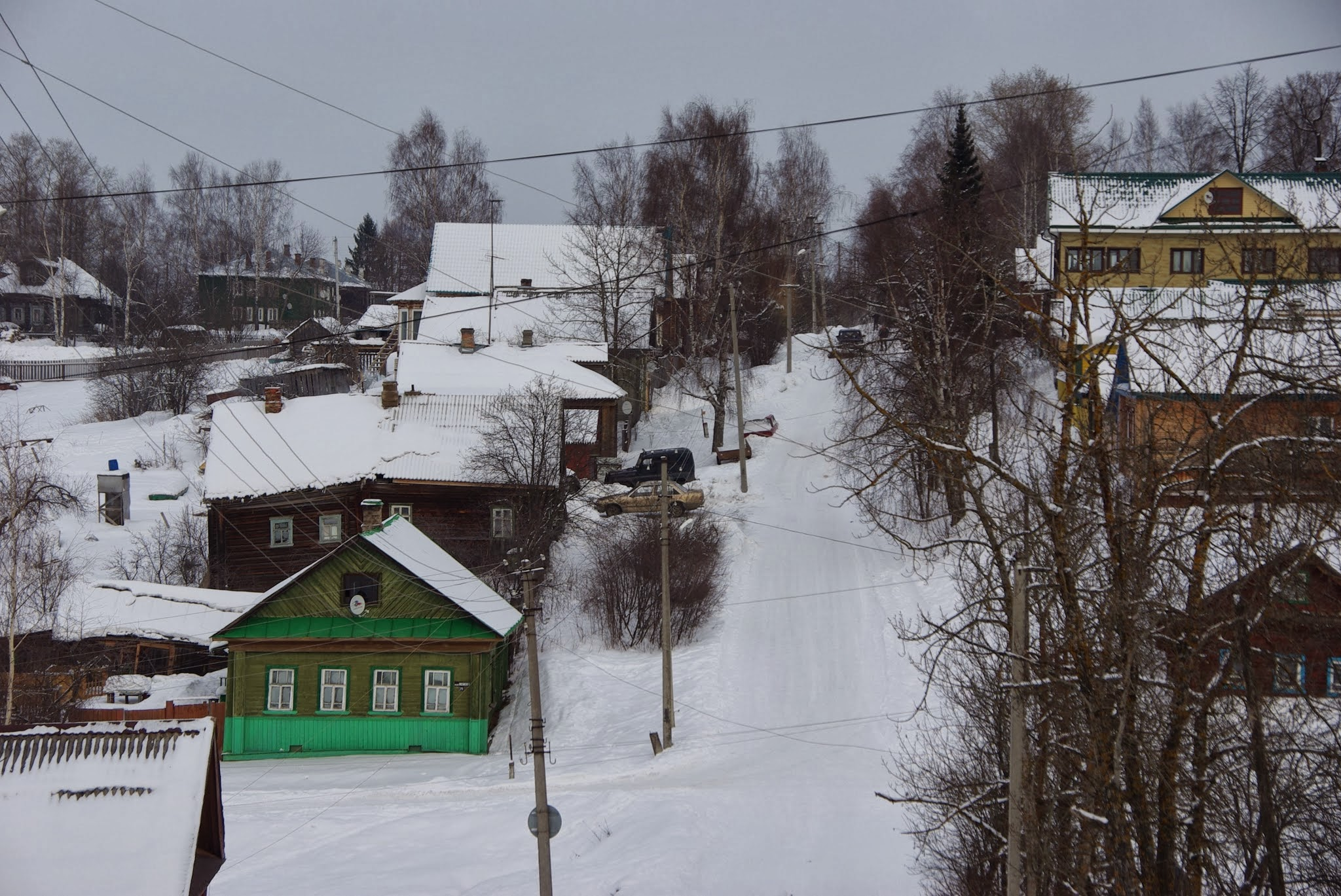
- Street in Chukhloma

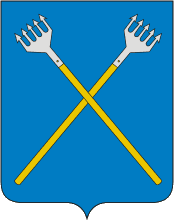
- Coat of arms
- Interactive map of Chukhloma
- Location of Chukhloma Chukhloma (Kostroma Oblast)
- Coordinates: 58°45′N 42°40′E
- Country: Russia
- Federal subject: Kostroma Oblast
- Administrative district: Chukhlomsky District
- Town of district significanceSelsoviet: Chukhloma
- First mentioned: 1381
- Town status since: 1778
- Elevation: 180 m (590 ft)

Population (2010 Census)
  - Total: 5,411
  - Estimate (2021): 4,252 (−21.4%)

Administrative status
  - Capital of: Chukhlomsky District, town of district significance of Chukhloma

Municipal status
  - Municipal district: Chukhlomsky Municipal District
  - Urban settlement: Chukhloma Urban Settlement
  - Capital of: Chukhlomsky Municipal District, Chukhloma Urban Settlement
- Time zone: UTC+3 (MSK)
- Postal code: 157130
- OKTMO ID: 34646101001

Chukhloma (Russian: Чу́хлома) is a town and the administrative center of Chukhlomsky District in Kostroma Oblast, Russia, located on Lake Chukhloma, 50 kilometers (31 mi) from the railway node Galich and 171 kilometers (106 mi) northeast of Kostroma, the administrative center of the oblast. Population: 4,252 (2021 census); 5,411 (2010 census); 5,464 (2002 census); 5,597 (1989 Soviet census).

== History ==
It was first mentioned in chronicles in 1381, and was destroyed during the Time of Troubles. It was granted town status in 1778.

== Etymology ==
From a substrate Finno-Ugric language (cf. Proto-Uralic *ćukkз 'hill, peak', referring to the landscape around the town). Max Vasmer supported the theory of relationship between the name of Chukhloma and the ethnonyms like Chud or Chukhna, but it's viewed as folk etymology by Aleksandr Matveyev.

== Administrative and municipal status ==
Within the framework of administrative divisions, Chukhloma serves as the administrative center of Chukhlomsky District. As an administrative division, it is incorporated within Chukhlomsky District as the town of district significance of Chukhloma. As a municipal division, the town of district significance of Chukhloma is incorporated within Chukhlomsky Municipal District as Chukhloma Urban Settlement.

== Culture ==
Near the town there is a historical family estate of the Lermontov family.
