= Chukhlomsky District =

Chukhlomsky District Чухломский район (Russian)
- District
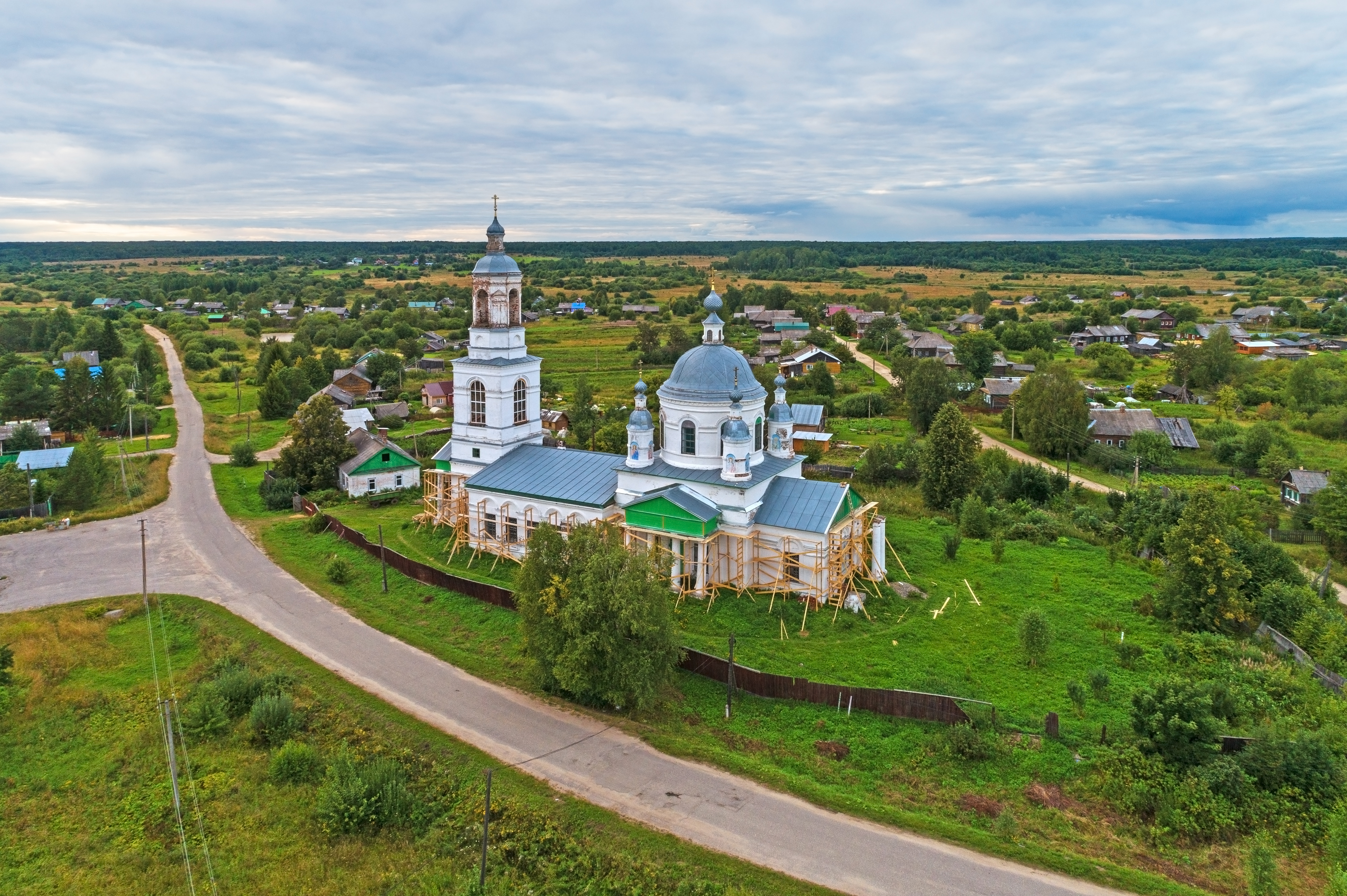
- Church of the Protection of the Theotokos, Nozhkino, Chukhlomsky District

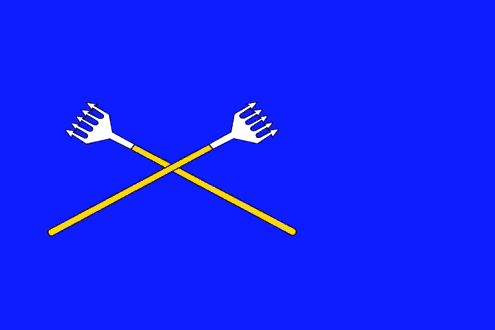
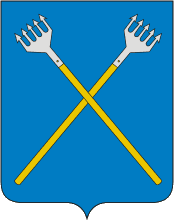
- Flag Coat of arms
- Location of Chukhlomsky District in Kostroma Oblast
- Coordinates: 58°45′N 42°42′E
- Country: Russia
- Federal subject: Kostroma Oblast
- Administrative center: Chukhloma

Area
  - Total: 3,643 km^{2} (1,407 sq mi)

Population (2010 Census)
  - Total: 11,346
  - Density: 3.114/km^{2} (8.066/sq mi)
  - Urban: 47.7%
  - Rural: 52.3%

Administrative structure
  - Administrative divisions: 1 Towns of district significance, 7 Settlements
  - Inhabited localities: 1 cities/towns, 219 rural localities

Municipal structure
  - Municipally incorporated as: Chukhlomsky Municipal District
  - Municipal divisions: 1 urban settlements, 7 rural settlements
- Time zone: UTC+3 (MSK)
- OKTMO ID: 34646000
- Website: http://chuhloma.net/

Chukhlomsky District (Russian: Чу́хломский райо́н) is an administrative and municipal district (raion), one of the twenty-four in Kostroma Oblast, Russia. It is located in the north of the oblast. The area of the district is 3,643 square kilometers (1,407 sq mi). Its administrative center is the town of Chukhloma. Population: 8,101 (2021 census); 11,346 (2010 census); 13,574 (2002 Census); 15,466 (1989 Soviet census). The population of Chukhloma accounts for 52.5% of the district's total population.
