= Lake Chukhloma =

Lake in Kostroma Oblast, Russia

Chukhloma Lake
- Location within Kostroma Oblast
- Location: Kostroma Oblast
- Coordinates: 58°47′N 42°37′E
- Type: natural lake
- Basin countries: Russia
- Surface area: 48.7 km^{2} (18.8 sq mi)
- Average depth: 4.5 m (15 ft)
- Surface elevation: 148 m (486 ft)

Chukhloma Lake (Russian: Чу́хломское озеро) is a freshwater lake in Kostroma Oblast in Russia. It is located at around 58°47′N 42°37′E, at an elevation of 148 meters above sea level. It has an area of 48.7 km², and an average depth of 4.5 meters.

The lake is almost circular in shape, with a diameter of 6–7 km. The shores are flat and boggy. The bottom consists of mud and silt. It is frozen from late October to late April. A number of small rivers and streams enters the Chukhloma Lake. It has an outflow towards the northwest, which drains towards the Kostroma River.

At the lake's southeastern shore lies the town of Chukhloma. At its northern shore, in the village of Nozhkino, lies the Avraamiyevo-Gorodetsky Monastery, founded by Avraamy of Galich in the 15th century.

The lake is also home to the Chukhloma crucian carp, mentions of which date back to 1671. This variety of carp is unusual as they stop growing in length once they reach 14 inches (36 cm) and grow only in width.
