= Abraham of Galich =

Saint Abraham of Galich
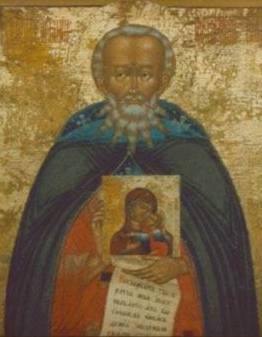

Abbot
- Died: 20 July 1375
- Venerated in: Russian Orthodox Church
- Canonized: 1553 and 1621, Kostroma
- Feast: 20 July

Abraham of Galich (Russian: Авраамий Галичский, romanized: Avraamy Galichsky; also Chukhlomsky or Gorodetsky; died 20 July 1375) was an abbot of the Russian Orthodox Church. He was a disciple of Sergius of Radonezh, and later went on to found four monasteries on Lake Chukhloma, in the region of Galich in present-day Kostroma Oblast. His feast day is on 20 July.

== Life and devotion ==
The birthplace and secular name of Abraham is unknown. According to the excerpt from his hagiography, he originally worked in the Pechersky Ascension Monastery in Nizhny Novgorod, from where he moved to the Troitse-Sergiyeva Lavra.

After some time, with the blessing of Sergius of Radonezh, Abraham went to the Galich princedom, where he founded the first monastery in the Galich region, named Avraamiyev Novozaozersky (Russian: Авраамиев Новозаозерский) in honor of the Dormition of the Most Holy Theotokos on the north-east shore of Galich Lake. In the legend of Abraham, it is said that he settled in the domain of Prince Dimitry of Galich, who possessed Galich in the years 1360–1363.

Later, Abraham founded another three monasteries; one of them is the Gorodets Monastery in honor of the Protection of the Holy Virgin located on the northern shore of Lake Chukhloma.

== Death ==
Abraham died in the chapel near the monastery, where he retreated shortly before his death, in about 1375. According to his legend, Abraham died on 20 July 1375, but D. F. Prilutsky and Y. E. Golubinsky believed that his death happened a little later, since Prince Yuri Dimitrievich was named to be his contemporary, who received the Galich lands in 1389.

A stone cathedral in honor of the Intercession of the Theotokos was built over the relics of Abraham in 1608–1631, later after this monastery was ruined, in 1857–1867 over the relics of the monk, the cathedral was built in honor of the icon of the Mother of God Tenderness. In 1981, on the initiative of the Archbishop of Kostroma and Galich Cassian (Yaroslav) was founded the Cathedral of the Kostroma Saints, in which the name of Abraham was entered.

== Canonization and veneration ==
Abraham was twice canonized to local veneration – in 1553 and in 1621 (perhaps a diocesan celebration). The hagiography of Abraham was compiled in 1548–1553 by an abbot of Gorodets Monastery, Protasy, who took the old monastic records about the saint as a basis.

He is venerated as a saint in the Russian Orthodox Church, with a feast day of 20 July.

== External sources ==
- Holweck, F. G. A Biographical Dictionary of the Saints. St. Louis, MO: B. Herder Book Co. 1924.
- Repose of the Venerable Abramius of Galich or Chukhom Lake, and Disciple of the Venerable Sergius of Radonezh, Orthodox Church in America.
- Д.Ф. Прилуцкий (Prilutsky). Историческое описание Городецкого Авраамиева монастыря в Костромской губернии // Преподобный Авраамий Городецкий, Чухломской и Галичский чудотворец и созданный им Свято-Покровский Авраамиево-Городецкий монастырь.(Historical description of Gorodets Abrahamiev monastery in Kostroma region// St. Abraham Gorodetsky, Chuhlomsky and Galitzki wonder-worker and Gorodets monastery founded by him) Moscow, 1996, p. 145-156
- Е.Е. Голубинский (Yevgeny Golubinsky). История канонизации святых в Русской Церкви. (The history of canonization of Saints in Russian church) Moscow, 1903; reprint: Moscow, 1998, p. 11
- Н. А. Зонтиков, Э. Н. И. Авраамий Галичский. Православная энциклопедия (Abraham Galitzki. Orthodox encyclopedia), vol. 1, p. 173-175
