= List of saints of the Serbian Orthodox Church =

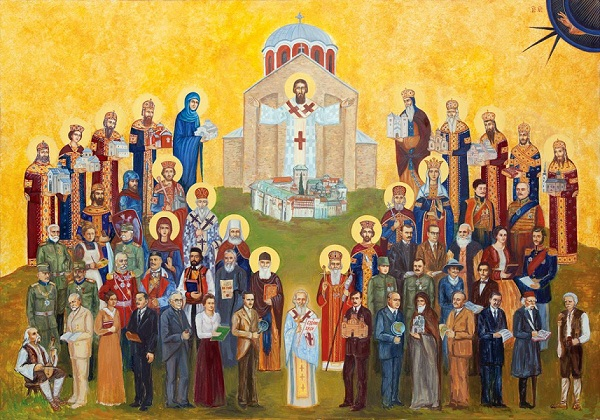
Serbian Orthodox icon depicting Saint Sava (centre, standing in orans) along with other Serbian saints and notable Serbs

Within the liturgical calendar of the Serbian Orthodox Church, numerous saints of ethnic Serb origin are commemorated and venerated.

The Serbian Orthodox Church venerates all Eastern Orthodox saints, regardless of ethnic background, including figures such as John the Baptist, Maximus the Greek, and Nicholas II of Russia.

The list below, however, includes only saints who were either of Serb ethnic descent and/or affiliated with the Serbian Orthodox Church or one of its historical predecessor jurisdictions, such as the Serbian Patriarchate of Peć. Folk saints who have not been formally canonised by the Church (for example Patriarch Pavle, Milica Rakić, and Thaddeus of Vitovnica) are not included.

== List ==
Image	Name	Died (Year)	Feast Day (NS/OS)	Notes
	Anastasia of Serbia; Анастасија Српска; Anastasija Srpska	1200	4 July [O.S. 21 June]	Right-Believing, Grand Princess consort of Serbia, Venerable, wife of St. Simeon the Myroblyte; native name Ana Vukanović
	Angelina of Serbia; Ангелина Српска; Angelina Srpska	1520	14 July [O.S. 1 July] 12 August [O.S. 30 July] 23 December [O.S. 10 December]	Right-Believing, Despotess consort of Serbia, Venerable, wife of John Branković; surnamed Branković
	Arsenius I the Syrmian; Арсеније I Сремац; Arsenije I Sremac	1266	10 November [O.S. 28 October]	2nd Archbishop of Serbia (r. 1233–1263), Venerable, disciple of St. Sava I
	Barnabas the New Confessor; Варнава Нови Исповедник; Varnava Novi Ispovednik	1964	12 November [O.S. 30 October]	Titular Bishop of Hvosno, New Hieroconfessor; surnamed Nastić
	Basil of Ostrog; Василије Острошки; Vasilije Ostroški	1671	12 May [O.S. 29 April]	Bishop of Zachlumia, Venerable Wonderworker; who founded Ostrog Monastery
	Bessarion Sarai; Висарион Сарај; Visarion Saraj	1744	3 November [O.S. 21 October]	New Venerable Hieroconfessor, Hieromonk
	Branko of Veljun; Бранко Вељунски; Branko Veljunski	1941	7 May [O.S. 24 April]	New Hieromartyr, parish priest of Veljun; surnamed Dobrosavljević
	Budimir of Dobrun; Будимир Добрунски; Budimir Dobrunski	1945	11 July [O.S. 28 June]	New Hieromartyr, one of the New Martyrs of Dabar-Bosnia and Mileševa; surnamed Sokolović
	Cyril I Кирило I Kirilo I	1418 / 1419	12 September [O.S. 30 August]	8th Patriarch of Serbia (r. 1407–1419), Venerable
	Damian of Grahovo; Дамјан Граховски; Damjan Grahovski	1941	13 June [O.S. 31 May] First Saturday after Elijah's day	New Hieromartyr; surnamed Štrbac
	Daniel II; Данило II; Danilo II	1337	2 January [O.S. 20 December]	11th Archbishop of Serbia (r. 1324–1337), Venerable; who wrote many hagiographies of Serbian saints
	David of Serbia; Давид Српски; David Srpski	1286	7 October [O.S. 24 September]	Venerable, who founded the Davidovica Monastery; birth name Dmitar Nemanjić
	Dositheus of Zagreb; Доситеј Загребачки; Dositej Zagrebački	1945	13 January [O.S. 31 December]	Metropolitan of Zagreb, New Venerable Hieroconfessor; surnamed Vasić
	Ephraim of Serbia; Јефрем Српски; Jefrem Srpski	1400	28 June [O.S. 15 June]	3rd Patriarch of Serbia (r. 1375–1379, 1389–1392), Venerable
	Eustathius I Јевстатије I Jevstatije I	1286	17 January [O.S. 4 January]	6th Archbishop of Serbia (r. 1279–1286), Venerable
	Eustathius II; Јевстатије II; Jevstatije II	1309	29 August [O.S. 16 August]	8th Archbishop of Serbia (r. 1292–1309), Venerable; who established seven new eparchies
	Euthymius of Dečani; Јефтимије Дечански; Jeftimije Dečanski	1501–1600	24 November [O.S. 11 November]	Venerable Martyr
	Gabriel I Гаврило I Српски; Gavrilo I Srpski	1659	26 December [O.S. 13 December]	22nd Patriarch of Serbia (r. 1648–1655), Venerable Hieromartyr; surnamed Rajić
	George of Slavonia; Георгије Славонски; Georgije Slavonski	1941	17 July [O.S. 4 July]	New Hieromartyr; native name Đorđe Bogić
	Gregory of Gornjak; Григорије Горњачки; Grigorije Gornjački	c. 1406	20 December [O.S. 7 December]	Venerable, Hesychast; a.k.a. Gregory the Younger, Gregory the Hesychast and Gregory the Silent
	Gregory II of Ras; Григорије II Рашки; Grigorije II Raški	1321	12 September [O.S. 30 August]	Bishop of Raška, Venerable; a monk-scribe who transcribed the nomocanon Raška krmčija
	Habakkuk the Deacon; Ђакон Авакум; Đakon Avakum	1814	30 December [O.S. 17 December]	Hierodeacon, New Venerable Hieromartyr, who was martyred with St. Paisius; birth name Lepoje Prodanović
	Helen of Dečani; Јелена Дечанска; Jelena Dečanska	c. 1357	3 June [O.S. 21 May]	Right-Believing, Empress consort of Bulgaria, Venerable, daughter of St. Milutin; regnal name Ana-Neda
	Helen of Serbia; Јелена Српска; Jelena Srpska	1314	12 November [O.S. 30 October]	Right-Believing, Venerable, Queen consort of Serbia, wife of St. Uroš the Great, Ktetor, who founded Gradac Monastery; a.k.a. Helena of Anjou
	Helena Štiljanović; Јелена Штиљановић; Jelena Štiljanović	1546	17 October [O.S. 4 October]	Venerable, Princess consort of Serbia, wife of St. Stefan Štiljanović; tonsured as Jelisaveta
	Holy Martyrs of Jasenovac; Јасеновачки Новомученици; Jasenovački Novomučenici	1941–1945	13 September [O.S. 31 August]	New Martyrs, who were martyred by the Ustaše in and around Jasenovac concentration camp
	Holy 42 Martyrs of Momišići; 42 Мученика Момишићка; 42 Mučenika Momišićka	1688	22 March [O.S. 9 March]	New Martyrs, who consisted of 2 priest-teachers and their 40 students and were martyred by the Ottomans in Momišići
	Hypomone; Хипомона; Hipomona	1450	11 June [O.S. 29 May]	Venerable, Empress consort of the Byzantine Empire, wife of St. Manuel II Palaiologos; birth name Jelena Dragaš
	Isaiah of Onogošt; Исаија од Оногошта; Isaija od Onogošta	1601–1625	11 May [O.S. 28 April]	Venerable hermit, who built a cave church in what is now Ostrog Monastery; a.k.a. Isaiah of Ostrog
	Jacob the New of Tuman; Јаков Нови Тумански; Jakov Novi Tumanski	1946	21 August [O.S. 8 August]	New Venerable Confessor; tortured by the Communists for distributing 8,000 copies of the Lord's Prayer at a train station in Požarevac; birth name Radoje Arsović
	Jacob of Serbia; Јаков Српски; Jakov Srpski	1292	16 February [O.S. 3 February]	7th Archbishop of Serbia (r. 1286–1292), Venerable
	Jaglika of Piva; Јаглика Пивска; Jaglika Pivska	1943	28 July [O.S. 15 July]	New Martyr, one of the 46 New Martyrs of Plužine in the Doli Pivski massacre
	Joannicius of Devič; Јоаникије Девички; Joanikije Devički	1464	15 December [O.S. 2 December]	Venerable Wonderworker; a.k.a. Janićije
	Joannicius I of Montenegro; Јоаникије I Црногорско-Приморски; Joanikije ICrnogorsko-Primorski	1945	17 June [O.S. 4 June]	Metropolitan of Montenegro and the Littoral, New Venerable Hieromartyr; surnamed Lipovac
	Joannicius II of Serbia; Јоаникије II Српски; Joanikije II Srpski	1354	16 September [O.S. 3 September]	1st Patriarch of Serbia, previously 12th Archbishop of Serbia,(r. 1338–1346, 1346–1354), Venerable; the Serbian Church was made autocephalous and declared a Patriarchate during his reign in 1346
	Joasaph of Meteora; Јоасаф Метеорски; Joasaf Meteorski	1422 / 1423	3 May [O.S. 20 April]	Venerable, titular Emperor of Serbs and Greeks (r. 1370–1373); native name Jovan Uroš Nemanjić; a.k.a. John Ouresis Doukas Palaiologos
	John the New; Јован Нови; Jovan Novi	1502	23 December [O.S. 10 December]	Right-Believing, Despot of Serbia (r. 1493–1502), husband of St. Angelina; surnamed Branković
	John Vladimir; Јован Владимир; Jovan Vladimir	1016	4 June [O.S. 22 May]	Wonderworker, Myroblyte, Great Martyr, King of Duklja (r. c. 1000 – 1016)
	Joseph of Timișoara; Јосиф Темишварски; Josif Temišvarski	1656	28 September [O.S. 15 September]	Metropolitan of Timișoara, Venerable; a.k.a. Joseph the New
	Justin of Ćelije; Јустин Ћелијски; Justin Ćelijski	1979	14 June [O.S. 1 June]	Hegumen of Ćelije Monastery, Venerable, who wrote against communism and ecumenism; surnamed Popović
	Lazarus of Serbia; Лазар Српски; Lazar Srpski	1389	28 June [O.S. 15 June]	Right-Believing, Great Martyr, Prince of Serbia (r. 1371–1389), who was martyred at the Battle of Kosovo
	Macarius of Serbia; Макарије Српски; Makarije Srpski	1574	12 September [O.S. 30 August]	13th Patriarch of Serbia (r. 1557–1571), Venerable; surnamed Sokolović
	Mardarius of Lješanska, Libertyville and All America; Мардарије Љешанско–Либертивилски и Свеамерикански; Mardarije Lješansko–Libertivilski i Sveamerikanski	1935	12 December [O.S. 29 November]	First Bishop of America and Canada, Venerable; native name Mardarije Uskoković
	Maximus of Ungro-Wallachia; Максим Влахозапланински; Maksim Vlahozaplaninski	1516	31 January [O.S. 18 January]	Metropolitan of Belgrade, Metropolitan of Ungro-Wallachia, Venerable, titular Despot of Serbia (r. 1486–1497); who founded Krušedol Monastery; birth name Đorđe Branković
	Milica of Serbia; Милица Српска; Milica Srpska	1405	12 September [O.S. 30 August] (Serbian Orthodox); 1 August [O.S. 19 July] (Russian Orthodox)	Right-Believing, Hegumenia of Ljubostinja Monastery, which she founded, Venerable, Tsaritsa of Serbia; first tonsured as Jevgenija and later Jefrosina
	Milutin; Милутин; Milutin	1321	12 November [O.S. 30 October]	Right-Believing, King of Serbia (r. 1282–1321), Ktetor; regnal name Stefan Uroš II
	Miroslav of Imotski; Мирослав Имотски; Miroslav Imotski	1992	unknown	New Martyr; kidnapped and tortured by Croatian soldiers during the Croatian War of Independence, eventually being crucified and dying at the age of 33 - the same age Jesus is traditionally said to have died on the Cross
	Momčilo Grgurević; Момчило Гргуревић	1321	12 November [O.S. 30 October]	Right-Believing
	Nestor of Dečani; Нестор Дечански; Nestor Dečanski	1501–1600	24 November [O.S. 11 November]	Venerable
	Nestor of Mileševa; Нестор Милешевски; Nestor Mileševski	1941	11 July [O.S. 28 June]	Hegumen of Mileševa Monastery, New Venerable Hieromartyr, one of the New Martyrs of Dabar-Bosnia and Mileševa; surnamed Trkulja
	New Martyrs of Dabar-Bosnia and Mileševa; Свети новомученици Дабробосански и Милешевски; Sveti novomučenici Dabrobosanski i Mileševski	1941–1946	11 July [O.S. 28 June]	New Martyrs; who consisted of many clergymen and monastics and were martyred by the Ustaše (1941) and later by the Yugoslav Partisans (1945–1946)
	Nicanor of Hilandar; Никанор Хиландарски; Nikanor Hilandarski	1990	4 March [O.S. 19 February]	Hegumen of Hilandar Monastery, Venerable; a.k.a. Nicanor the New; surnamed Savić
	Nicholas of Ohrid and Žiča; Николај Охридски и Жички; Nikolaj Ohridski i Žički	1956	31 March [O.S. 18 March] 3 May [O.S. 20 April]	Bishop of Ohrid and Žiča, Venerable, the New Chrysostom; who wrote the Prologue of Ohrid; surnamed Velimirović
	Nicodemus I of Peć; Никодим I Пећки; Nikodim I Pećki	1325	24 May [O.S. 11 May]	10th Archbishop of Serbia (r. 1316–1324), Venerable, who co-founded Vratna Monastery with St. Milutin; a.k.a. Nicodemus of Hilandar
	Nicodemus of Tismana; Никодим Тисмански; Nikodim Tismanski	1406	8 January [O.S. 21 December]	Venerable; Hesychast; who founded three monasteries, one in Serbia and two in Romania; a.k.a. Nicodemus the Sanctified, surnamed Grčić
	Nikon I Никон I Nikon I	1435	12 September [O.S. 30 August]	9th Patriarch of Serbia (r. 1420–1435), Venerable
	Paisius the Hegumen; Игуман Пајсије; Iguman Pajsije	1814	30 December [O.S. 17 December]	Hegumen of Moštanica Monastery, New Venerable Martyr, who was martyred with St. Habakkuk; surnamed Ristović
	Paisius of Janjevo; Пајсије Јањевац; Pajsije Janjevac	1647	15 October [O.S. 2 October]	21st Patriarch of Serbia (r. 1614–1647), Venerable
	Peter of Cetinje; Петар Цетињски; Petar Cetinjski	1830	31 October [O.S. 18 October]	Prince-Bishop of Montenegro, Venerable Wonderworker, Myroblyte; regnal name Petar I Petrović-Njegoš
	Peter of Dabar and Bosnia; Петар Дабробосански; Petar Dabrobosanski	1941	17 September [O.S. 4 September]	Metropolitan of Dabar and Bosnia, New Hieromartyr; surnamed Zimonjić
	Peter of Koriša; Петар Коришки; Petar Koriški	1275–1300	18 June [O.S. 5 June]	Venerable Wonderworker; the first Serbian hermit, who practiced asceticism in the Hermitage of St. Peter of Koriša
	Platon of Banja Luka; Платон Бањалучки; Platon Banjalučki	1941	5 May [O.S. 22 April]	Bishop of Banja Luka, New Venerable Hieromartyr; surnamed Jovanović
	Raphael of Banat; Рафаило Банатски; Rafailo Banatski	1601–1700	29 August [O.S. 16 August]	Venerable
	Raphael of Šišatovac; Рафаило Шишатовачки; Rafailo Šišatovački	1941	3 September [O.S. 21 August]	Prior of Šišatovac Monastery, New Venerable Hieromartyr; surnamed Momčilović
	Sava I Сава I Sava I	1237	27 January [O.S. 14 January] (Saint Sava Day)	Equal-to-the-Apostles, Enlightener of the Serbs, first Archbishop of Serbia (r. 1219–1233), Venerable Hieroconfessor, son of Simeon the Myrrh-Streaming, patron saint of Serbia, Serbs and Serbian education and medicine; birth name Rastko Nemanjić
	Sava II; Сава II; Sava II	1271	21 February [O.S. 8 February]	3rd Archbishop of Serbia (r. 1263–1271), Venerable, nephew of St. Sava I; birth name Predislav Nemanjić
	Sava II Branković; Сава II Бранковић; Sava II Branković	1683	7 June [O.S. 24 May]	Metropolitan of Transylvania, Venerable Hieroconfessor; a.k.a. Sabbas Brancovici in Romanian
	Sava III; Сава III; Sava III	1316	8 August [O.S. 26 July] 12 September [O.S. 30 August]	9th Archbishop of Serbia (r. 1309–1316), Venerable
	Sava of Gornji Karlovac; Сава Горњокарловачки; Sava Gornjokarlovački	1941	17 July [O.S. 4 July]	Bishop of Gornji Karlovac, New Venerable Hieromartyr; surnamed Trlajić
	Sebastian of Jackson; Севастијан Џексонски; Sevastijan Džeksonski	1940	30 November [O.S. 17 November]	Missionary, Archimandrite, Venerable; surnamed Dabović
	Seraphim of the Trinity; Серафим Тројички; Serafim Trojički	1941	11 July [O.S. 28 June]	Hegumen of the Monastery of the Holy Trinity of Pljevlja, New Venerable Hieromartyr, one of the New Martyrs of Dabar-Bosnia and Mileševa; surnamed Džarić
	Simeon of Dajbabe; Симеон Дајбабски; Simeon Dajbabski	1941	1 April [O.S. 19 March]	Hegumen of Dajbabe Monastery, Venerable, Hieromonk; surnamed Popović
	Simeon the Monk; Симеон Монах; Simeon Monah	1228	7 October [O.S. 24 September]	Right-Believing, Venerable, Grand Prince of Serbia (r. 1196–1228), son of St. Simeon the Myroblyte; regnal name Stefan the First-Crowned and surnamed Nemanjić
	Simeon the Myroblyte; Симеон Мироточиви; Simeon Mirotočivi	1200	26 February [O.S. 13 February]	Right-Believing, Venerable, Myroblyte, Grand Prince of Serbia (r. 1166–1196), father of St. Sava I; and Simeon the Monk; birth name Stefan Nemanja
	Slobodan of Donja Kamenica; Слободан Доњокаменички; Slobodan Donjokamenički	1992	27 July [O.S. 14 July]	New Child Martyr, who was martyred by a Kosovar Albanian woman named Elfeta Veseli after searching for his dog during the Bosnian War; surnamed Stojanović
	Spyridon of Serbia; Спиридон Српски; Spiridon Srpski	1389	28 June [O.S. 15 June]	4th Patriarch of Serbia (r. 1380–1389), Venerable
	Stanislav of Lička Jesenica; Станислав Личко-Јесенички; Stanislav Ličko-Jesenički	1941	17 July [O.S. 4 July] (Serbian Orthodox); 3 July [O.S. 20 June] (Czech Orthodox)	New Hieromartyr, a Czech by birth who became parish priest of Lička Jesenica; surnamed Nasadil
	Stephen the Blind; Стефан Слепи; Stefan Slepi	1476	22 October [O.S. 9 October] 23 December [O.S. 10 December]	Right-Believing, Despot of Serbia (r. 1458–1459); surnamed Branković
	Stephen of Dečani; Стефан Дечански; Stefan Dečanski	1331	24 November [O.S. 11 November]	Martyr, King of Serbia (r. 1322–1331), Ktetor, who founded Visoki Dečani; regnal name Stefan Uroš III
	Stephen of Piperi; Стефан Пиперски; Stefan Piperski	1697	2 June [O.S. 20 May]	Hegumen of Morača Monastery, Venerable
	Stephen the Tall; Стефан Високи; Stefan Visoki	1427	1 August [O.S. 19 July]	Right-Believing, Righteous, Prince (r. 1389–1402) and Despot of Serbia (r. 1402–1427), Ktetor, patron saint of the Serbian Armed Forces; surnamed Lazarević
	Stephen Štiljanović; Стефан Штиљановић; Stefan Štiljanović	1543	17 October [O.S. 4 October]	Right-Believing, Righteous, last Despot of Serbia (r. 1537–1543), husband of Helena Štiljanović
	Theoctistus of Serbia; Теоктист Српски; Teoktist Srpski	1316	12 November [O.S. 30 October]	King of Serbia (r. 1276–1282) and King of Syrmia (r. 1282–1316), Venerable; regnal name Stefan Dragutin
	Theodore of Komogovo; Теодор Комоговински; Teodor Komogovinski	1788	First Saturday of Great Lent (Theodore's Saturday)	Venerable Martyr; surnamed Sladić
	Theodore of Vršac; Теодор Вршачки; Teodor Vršački	1594	29 May [O.S. 16 May]	Bishop of Vršac, Venerable Hieromartyr, patron saint of Vršac; surnamed Nestorović
	Uroš the Great; Урош Велики; Uroš Veliki	1277	1 May [O.S. 19 April]	Right-Believing, King of Serbia (r. 1243–1276), Ktetor; regnal name Stefan Uroš I
	Uroš the Weak; Урош Нејаки; Uroš Nejaki	1371	15 December [O.S. 2 December]	Right-Believing, Emperor of the Serbs (r. 1355–1371), Ktetor; regnal name Stefan Uroš V
	Urošica; Урошица; Urošica	1285–1316	24 November [O.S. 11 November]	Venerable, Myroblyte; birth name Stefan Urošic Nemanjić
	Vladislav; Владислав; Vladislav	c. 1269	7 October [O.S. 24 September] 12 August [O.S. 30 July]	Right-Believing, King of Serbia (r. 1234–1243), Ktetor; regnal name Stefan Vladislav
	Vukašin of Klepci; Вукашин Клепачки; Vukašin Klepački	1943	29 May [O.S. 16 May] 13 September [O.S. 31 August]	New Martyr; a.k.a. Vukašin of Jasenovac, surnamed Mandrapa
	Zlata of Meglen; Злата Магленска	1321	12 November [O.S. 30 October]	Right-Believing
	Zosimus of Tuman; Зосим Тумански; Zosim Tumanski	1450–1500	21 August [O.S. 8 August]	Venerable Wonderworker, who lived in a cave near what is now Tuman Monastery

== See also ==
- List of Eastern Orthodox saint titles
- List of Eastern Orthodox saints
- List of Russian Eastern Orthodox saints
- List of American Eastern Orthodox saints
