= Stefan Štiljanović =

Serbian nobleman and saint (died 1543)

Saint Stefan Štiljanović Стефан Штиљановић
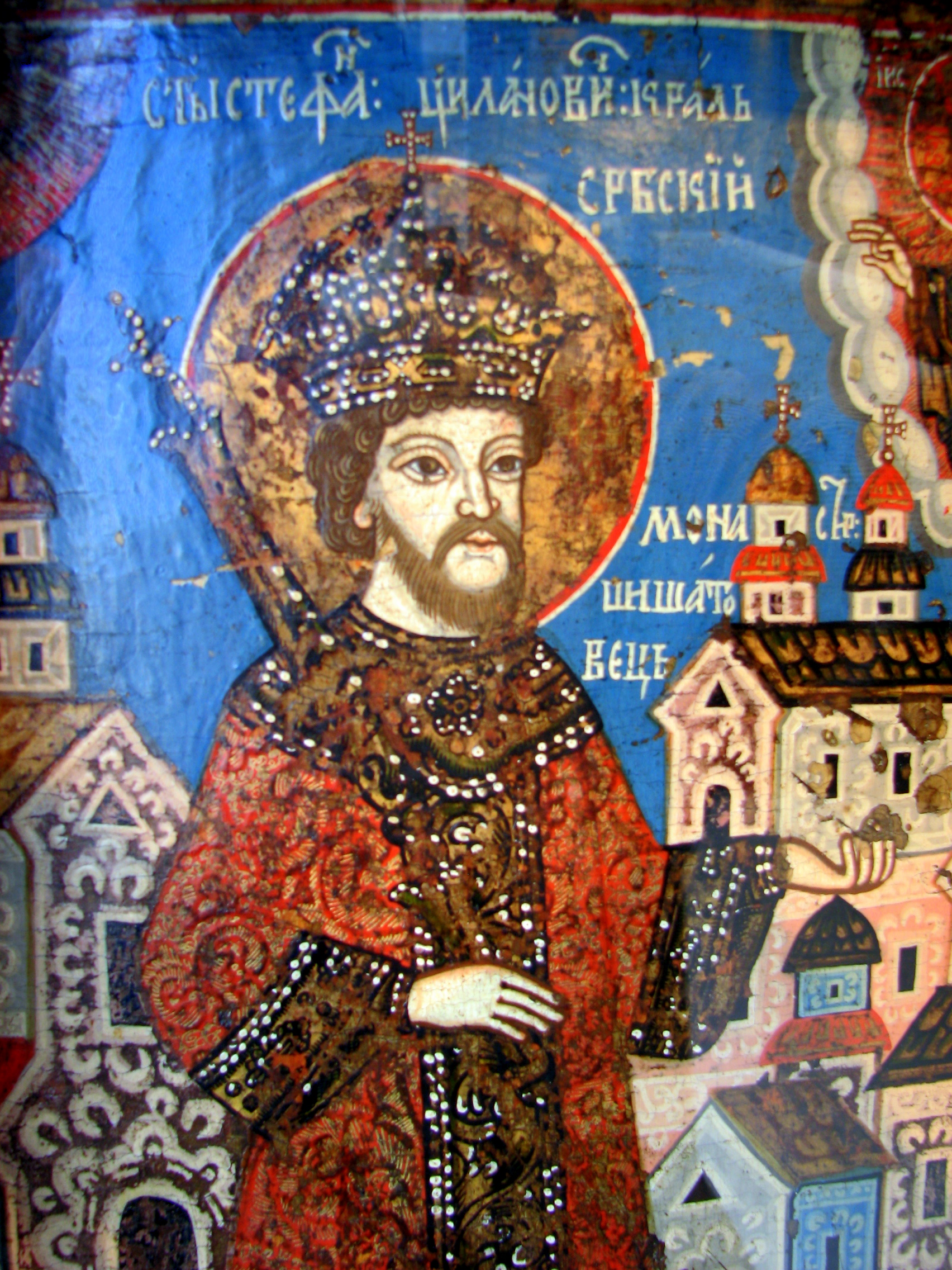
- Serbian Icon, made by Stanoje Popović (1740)

Saint Leader
- Died: 1543
- Venerated in: Serbian Orthodox Church
- Major shrine: Šišatovac
- Feast: October 17
- Administrator Knez of the Paštrovići

Despot of Serbia (Note: Title: Through his notable office under the Hungarian crown, which is comparable to that of his predecessors, he has a notable place in Serbian history. Stefan Štiljanović was never officially a despot, but according to folklore, he was the last Serbian despot, despite the fact that Pavle Bakić was the last official Serbian despot (1537). The first mention of him as a despot is in the panegyric of Šišatovac, written in 1545. The Serbian Orthodox Church venerate him as Saint Despot Stefan Štiljanović.)
- Reign: 1537–1543
- Predecessor: Pavle Bakić
- Born: Paštrovići (now Montenegro)
- Died: 1543; Göntér hill near Siklós, Baranya (now Hungary)
- Burial: Šišatovac, then Cathedral of Saint Archangel Michael, Belgrade
- Spouse: Jelena
Names
- Stefan Štiljanović
Posthumous name
- Saint Despot Stefan Štiljanović
- Religion: Serbian Orthodox Christian

Stefan Štiljanović (Serbian Cyrillic: Стефан Штиљановић; fl. 1498 – 1543) was the last prominent Serbian nobleman of the period of Ottoman Serbia, and according to folklore, he was the last Despot of Serbia. He ruled a large territory under the Hungarian crown, due to his famed operations against the Ottoman Empire in the frontiers. Štiljanović is venerated as a Saint in the Serbian Orthodox Church on 17 October [O.S. 4 October].

== Life ==
Štiljanović was born in Paštrovići (modern Montenegro). Paštrovići was mentioned in 1377 as one of the Serbian opština, and in 1423 they became subjects of the Republic of Venice after signing a treaty amid the Ottoman expansion. He was elected the knez of Paštrovići in the Rezevici Monastery, and would be the last and most celebrated one. Štiljanović had seven mills in his possession. He left his possessions to his people for Syrmia (modern Serbia) after a feud with the Republic of Venice, in 1498. The same year he had the town of Morović built, where he would have his residence. In 1507 he gained the town of Siklós in Baranya by Louis II of Hungary.

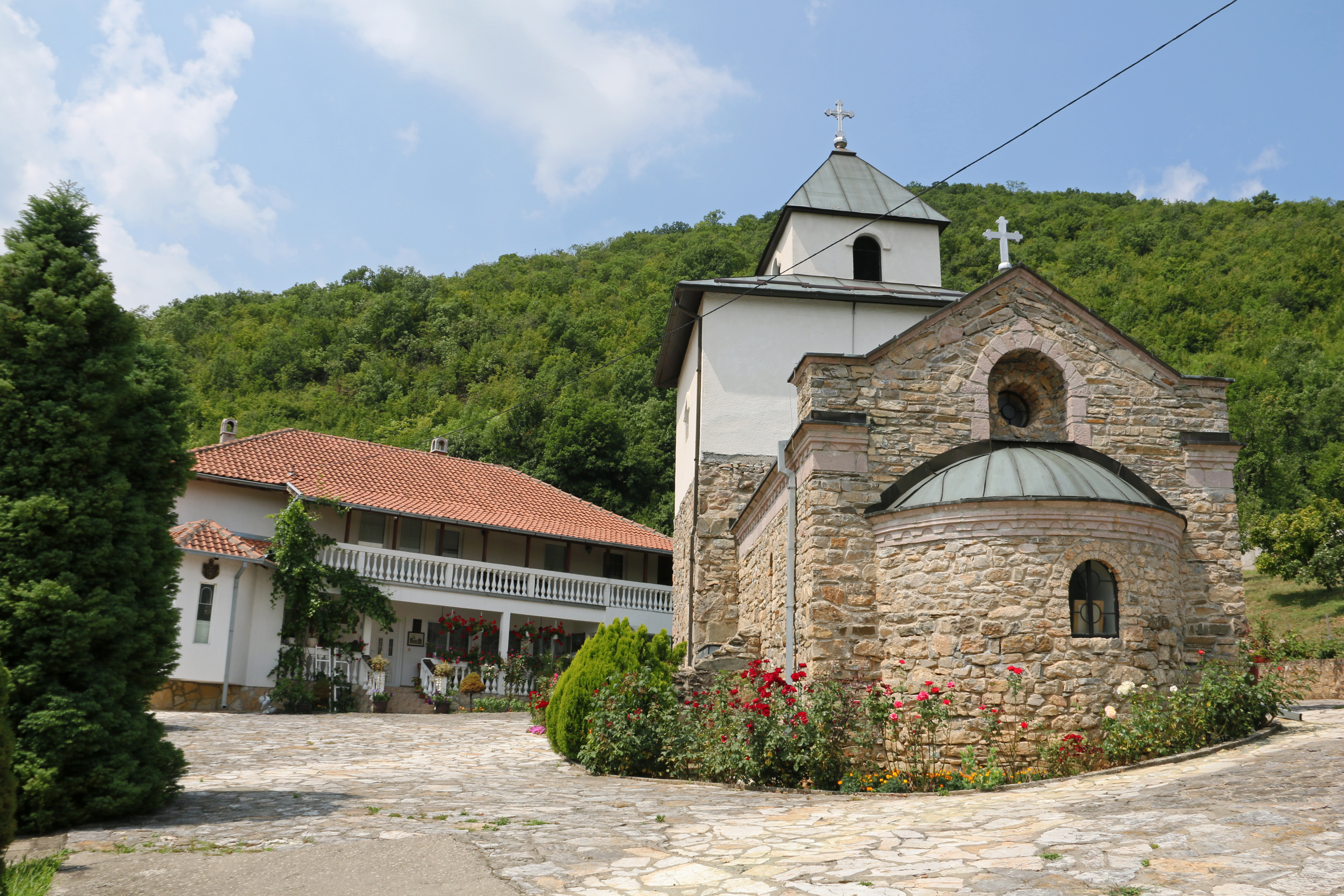
Petkovica Monastery was founded by Stefan Štiljanović

During the succession war between Ferdinand I and John Zápolya, he took the side of Ferdinand. After the crowning of Ferdinand on November 3, 1527, he became administrator of Novigrad and Orahovica. He also gained the villages of Donji Miholjac and Glogovnica, estates in the Virovitica county and the town of Valpovo, in which he had his residence. He administered significant towns which had earlier been under the rule of Jovan Nenad. He had his own flotilla.

Štiljanović was the commander of the Slavonian frontiersmen who fought against the Ottoman Empire. In 1543, he was defeated and captured by the Ottomans, but Murat-beg spared his life because of his famous heroism and let him free. He left Slavonia, and his last years were spent in Siklós, where he died around 1543.

In 1634, Serbian Patriarch Pajsije I Janjevac sojourned at the Šišatovac Monastery and there he wrote the biography of Stefan Štiljanović in a modern revival of the traditional Serbian hagiographical literature. During World War II, as part of organized destruction of Serbian cultural heritage and history, the Croatian Ustaše pillaged Štiljanović's tomb. The remains were deliberately damaged and valuables, such as his crown, were stolen and taken to Zagreb. Serbian church officials managed to recover the remains, which were then transferred and buried on the Göntér hill.

Ottoman vezir Skeder-paša Mihajlović was his nephew (through his mother).

== Sainthood ==
His mortal remains were later moved to the Šišatovac monastery, then during World War II to the Cathedral of Saint Archangel Michael in Belgrade. Štiljanović was proclaimed Saint by the Serbian Orthodox Church as Saint Despot Stefan Štiljanović, his feast day is on October 17. He is mentioned in a 1545 document of Šišatovac as a Saint.

According to tradition, his widow Jelena (also a Saint) founded the Petkovica monastery on the Fruška Gora. A church in Augsburg, Germany, is named after him and his wife: "Orthodox Parish of Saint Stefan and Saint Helena Stiljanovic".

== See also ==
- Kuveždin monastery, contemporary Serbian Orthodox monastery possibly built by Štiljanović

== Sources ==
- Đorđe V. Gregović, O PAŠTROVIĆIMA, Elektronska Biblioteka Kulture i Tradicije Boke
- Radomir Rakic, 1985, The Monastery of Rezevici, Petrovac na Moru, Elektronska Biblioteka Kulture i Tradicije Boke
- Univerzitet u Novom Sadu (University of Novi Sad), Šišatovac čeka neimare
- Vladimir Ćorović (Original: Istorija srpskoga naroda, 1941), Istorija srpskog naroda - Šesti Period, Srbi pod tuđom vlašću
- Miroslav Krleža 1975, Pomorska enciklopedija, Volume 2
- Drago Njegovan, Prisajedinjenje Vojvodine Srbiji, Novi Sad, 2004.
- Dr. Jovan Vukmanović - Paštrovići, Cetinje 1960

Regnal titles
Preceded by Pavle Bakić	Serbian Despot (unofficial); 1537–1543	Vacant Title next held by Jovan Monasterlija as Chief of the Serbian Nation (under Austria)
