= Jelena Štiljanović =

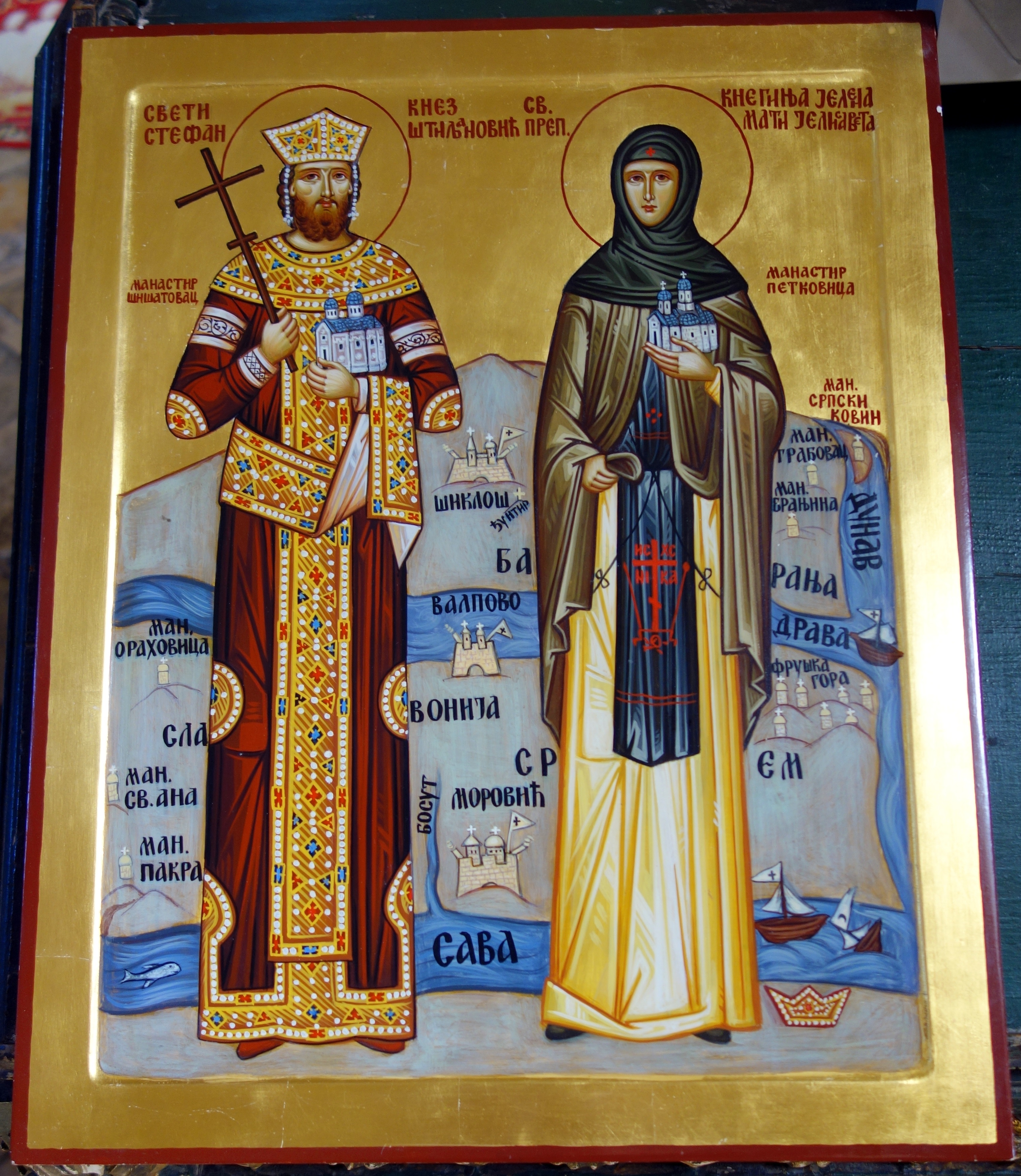
Jelena Štiljanović (right) with her husband Stefan Štiljanović, icon in St. Demetrios' Church in Siklós, Hungary

Jelena Štiljanović also known as Jelisaveta (died 1546) was a Serbian princess and saint.

== Life ==
She was the wife of Prince Stefan Štiljanović who is also venerated as a saint along with his wife. After his death, she fled from the Turks and went to Germany. When she learned that her husband's relics had been found, Jelena returned to the monastery of Šišatovac to pay homage to them. Once there, she decided to become a nun under the monastic name of Jelisaveta. The founding of the Petkovica Monastery around 1522 is attributed to her generosity. There is some evidence that she was buried at the Convent of the Blessed Virgin Mary in Sremski Karlovci.

The Serbian Orthodox Church celebrates her feast day on 4 October.

== See also ==
- List of Serbian saints
