= Pajsije of Janjevo =

Serbian Patriarch

Saint Pajsije of Janjevo
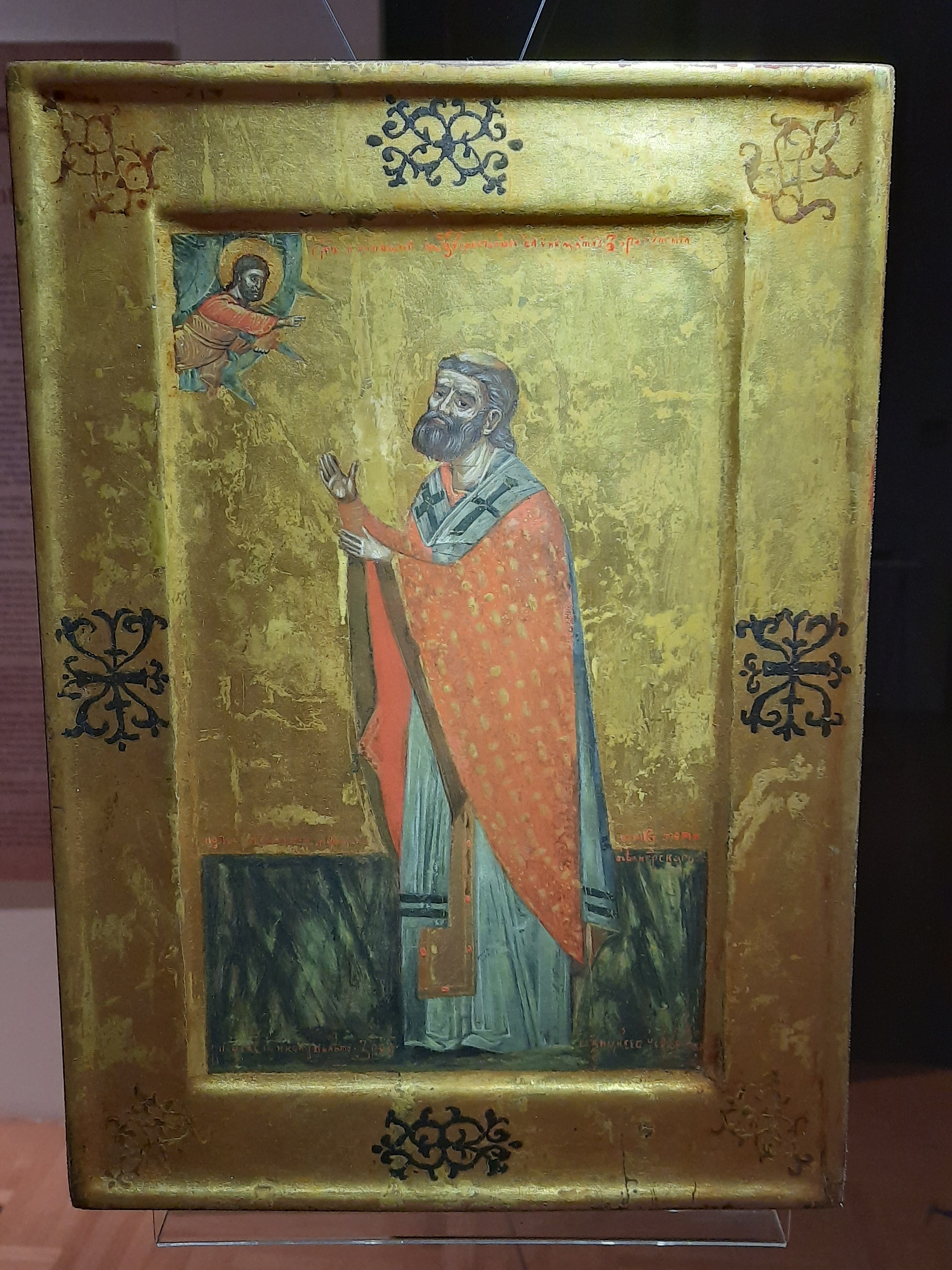
- Icon depicting Pajsije of Janjevo

Archbishop of Peć and Serbian Patriarch
- Born: 1542? Janjevo, Ottoman Empire, (modern day Kosovo)
- Died: 1647
- Church: Serbian Patriarchate of Peć
- See: Patriarchate of Peć Monastery
- Installed: 1614
- Term ended: 1647
- Predecessor: Jovan II
- Successor: Gavrilo I

Personal details
- Denomination: Eastern Orthodoxy

Pajsije of Janjevo (Serbian: Пајсије Јањевац / Pajsije Janjevac; Janjevo, 1542? – Peć, 2 November 1647) was the Patriarch of the Serbian Patriarchate of Peć from 1614 to 1647. He was also a writer, poet, composer, educator, and diplomat.

The greatest accomplishment of Serbian literature and theology happened under Patriarch Pajsije who inspired the revival of hagiographical literature and entered into theological debates with Pope Gregory XV and particularly with Pope Urban VIII concerning the question of the procession of the Holy Spirit. He patronized art on a grand scale. He funded works by woodcarvers of iconostasis and icon painters during his entire reign as patriarch from 1614 to 1648. His travels took him to Moscow in 1622, Constantinople in 1641, and Jerusalem in 1646.

== Life ==
Pajsije was born in Janjevo, at the time part of the Ottoman Empire, the son of a clergyman, Dimitrije. He was educated in his birth town where the wealthy folks of Janjevo had their school which he attended regularly and continued his education at the seminary of Gračanica monastery. He was a pupil of Jovan Kantul. Early in life he showed that he was a great "book lover" and a very cultured man who took care to preserve manuscripts scattered about various monasteries. He was a writer. Patriarch Pajsije states in one of his works, "Service to Tsar Uroš" (Stefan Uroš V), he put in it "Troparion" and "Kontakion"—writing first the Sticheron of the small vespers .... "all in the order required by liturgy."

Pajsije was elected Metropolitan of Novo Brdo and Lipljan in 1612. He was consecrated by Patriarch Jovan II Kantul and the Metropolitans of Sentence Synod on July 15, 1612. Today, there still exists one document in which he signed his name as "Humble Pajsije, Metropolitan of Novo Brdo." When Patriarch Jovan left for Constantinople in 1614, he appointed Pajsije as locum tenens. Patriarch Jovan was accused by the sultan's court for collaborating with the Holy Roman Empire and sentenced to death. This occurred four years prior to the Thirty Years' War.

When the news of Jovan's sentence arrived in Peć, Pajsije was elected patriarch on October 4, 1614. The new patriarch soon established relations with Tsardom of Russia. His name appeared in Russian state documents beginning in 1622 during the reign of Patriarch Philaret of Moscow and his son, Emperor Michael I of Russia. Pajsije often traveled. He visited the half-devastated Žiča Monastery in 1620 and began its repair. He visited Belgrade in 1632 and Šišatovac Monastery, which contains the relics of Saint Stefan Štiljanović on October 7, 1632. The patriarch, together with Jeftimije, Metropolitan of Niš and Leskovac, also visited Bishop Maxim Predojević of the Eparchy of Marča in Austro-Hungary (today's Croatia).

The militant policy of Patriarch Jovan ended with his mysterious death in Constantinople (Istanbul) but his successor, Pajsije adopted a more passive policy with both the Turks in Constantinople and the Pope in Rome. Pajsije realized that open rebellion could not set things right. Very early on he turned for aid to the Tsardom of Russia which had for a while already been a source of literary (service books) and some financial support. As the head of the Church, he worked earnestly to strengthen the faltering spirit of the nation through the constant celebration of liturgy and intense writing. He wrote a biography about the last Serbian emperor, Stefan Uroš V, and composed a Service to him. In his "Life of Emperor Uroš", Pajsije sought to connect this ruler to the uninterrupted line of Serbian history. His work started with the Nemanjić ancestry and continued to own time, with Uroš's life representing only one episode. In the book, Pajsije himself reveals his larger ambition: "It was my desire to understand and learn this: whence the Serbs originated, and for what purpose".

He also wrote the Service to St. Symon (Stefan the First-Crowned) and his successor, Gavrilo I (1648–1655) who, like Jovan Kantul, would die a martyr's death while in Turkish captivity in Bursa in 1659.

Pajsije's policy towards the Turks was compromising and always changing with every new Sultan. He outlived four of them, (Ahmed I, Mustafa I, Osman II and Murad IV). He also contemplated the question of union with the Roman Catholic Church informing Pope Urban VIII about the main obstacles separating Catholics and Orthodox faithful alike.

In 1642, a Roman Catholic emissary, Francesco Leonardi (missionary), arrived in Peć. In the pope's name, he tried to start negotiations towards a union. Patriarch Pajsije, together with two bishops, discussed this with him. Pajsije was strongly against the filioque. He was ready to recognize the pope's primatum honoris, but only if the pope gave up the filioque, azyme, and other new teachings. This was stated in a synodical letter that was sent to Rome. At the time, the Roman Curia had a program of compulsory conversion to Catholicism that would transfer Serbs into Croats by first having them join the Uniate Church, like in Kiev. In 1640, the Vatican's Sacred Congregation for the Propaganda of the Faith (Congregation for the Evangelization of Peoples) sought to gain Mardarije Kornečanin of Montenegro and Patriarch Pajsije, to the church union. Mardarije was also in favour of placing Montenegro under Venetian suzerainty. On the other hand, Pajsije's policy was far more prudent, his goal being that of balancing his nation's best interests between the East and the West.

With a conciliatory policy, Pajsije managed to alleviate the hardship of slavery and promote the Serbian spiritual and national revival, constantly reminding his people of their glorious past and Serbian statehood. By his wise policy and correct relationship towards Serbian cultural inheritance, Patriarch Pajsije succeeded in creating an atmosphere which produced an unexpected enthusiasm for building and decorating temples. He did not forget Niš, as well. In 1647, in his last days of life, he noted in the book that he was always carrying with himself - "Peć Memorabilia: Dorotej, Niš". The question has remained unanswered whether he visited Niš with the mentioned Dorotej or he may have sent his assistant Dorotej to Niš. Nevertheless, this is a valuable document and an important confirmation of the enlightened activities of Patriarch Pajsije in the area of Niš. His presence at Niš, as well as throughout the Serbian Patriarchate of Peć, contributed to the revival of cultural and religious life. His activities in the Niš region are reflected in the construction and restoration of Serbian churches and monasteries, as well as in the work of producing book, printing and publishing. In the seventeenth century, Patriarch Pajsije made great efforts to save older manuscripts, which he himself rebound and placed in safer monasteries or returned to their owners.

Patriarch Pajsije used his time in rebuilding and repairing churches, transliterating, and translating books. The church in Morača Monastery was painted in 1614 by Hilandar monks. Serbian noblemen rebuilt the Dobrilovina Monastery in 1614 and its church in Čukojevac. The patriarch was an avid book collector. Western diplomats who traveled to the Southeastern Europe bore witness that the Serbian Patriarchate of Peć was well-organized.

He canonized the last ruler from the Nemanjići dynasty, Emperor Stefan Uroš V. Patriarch Pajsije was forced to visit Constantinople in 1641 to obtain protection from local Ottoman governors.

Pajsije was wounded by a bull in the village of Budosavci. He died a few days later on November 2, 1647, and was buried in Patriarchal Monastery of Peć.

== Works ==
- Žitije cara Uroša (The Life of Emperor Uroš)
- Sluzba za poslednjeg Nemanjića (Service to Uroš, the Last of the Nemanjić)
- Sluzba prepodobnom Simeonu (Service to Simeon)
- Prološko žitije Simeonovo (The Life of Simeon)
- Biography of Stefan Štiljanović

== See also ==
- List of saints of the Serbian Orthodox Church
- List of heads of the Serbian Orthodox Church

Eastern Orthodox Church titles
| Preceded by Jovan II | Serbian Patriarch; 1614–1647 | Succeeded by Gavrilo I |

== Sources ==
- Ćirković, Sima (2004). The Serbs. Malden: Blackwell Publishing.
- Fotić, Aleksandar (2008). "Serbian Orthodox Church". Encyclopedia of the Ottoman Empire. New York: Infobase Publishing. pp. 519–520.
- Kašić, Dušan, ed. (1965). Serbian Orthodox Church: Its past and present. Vol. 1. Belgrade: Serbian Orthodox Church.
- Pavlovich, Paul (1989). The History of the Serbian Orthodox Church. Serbian Heritage Books.
- Слијепчевић, Ђоко М. (1962). Историја Српске православне цркве (History of the Serbian Orthodox Church). Vol. књ. 1. Минхен: Искра.
- Вуковић, Сава (1996). Српски јерарси од деветог до двадесетог века (Serbian Hierarchs from the 9th to the 20th Century). Београд: Евро.
- The question of the procession of the Holy Spirit (Jovanović 1992)
