= Vissarion (given name) =

Vissarion (Greek: Βησσαρίων, Russian: Виссарион) οr Visarion (Serbian Cyrillic: Висарион) is a Greek male name, which may refer to:

== Given name ==
- Saint Bessarion of Egypt, also Bessarion the Great or Passarion, Egyptian anchorite, wonderworker and abbot, disciple of Saint Anthony the Great
- Basilios Bessarion (1403–1472), Greek scholar, Catholic cardinal and Latin patriarch of Constantinople
- Visarion, Metropolitan of Herzegovina (s. 1590–1602)
- Visarion Saraj (1714–1744), Serbian Orthodox hieromonk and new martyr
- Vissarion Belinsky (1811–1848), Russian literary critic
- Visarion Ljubiša (1823–1884), Metropolitan of Montenegro (s. 1882–84)
- Vissarion Dzhugashvili (1849–1909), father of Joseph Vissarionovich Stalin
- Visarion Puiu (1879–1964), born as Victor Puiu, Romanian metropolitan bishop
- Visarion Xhuvani (1890–1965), Primate of the Orthodox Church of Albania (s. 1929–37)
- Vissarion Lominadze (1897–1935), Georgian revolutionary and Soviet politician
- Vissarion Shebalin (1902–1963), Soviet Russian composer
- Vissarion Korkoliacos (1908–1991), Greek Orthodox monk
- Vissarion (born 1961 as Sergey Anatolyevitch Torop), Russian mystic

== Surname ==
- I. C. Vissarion (1879–1951), Romanian writer
