= Rafailo Momčilović =

Serbian Orthodox saint

Saint Rafailo Momčilović Рафаило Момчиловић
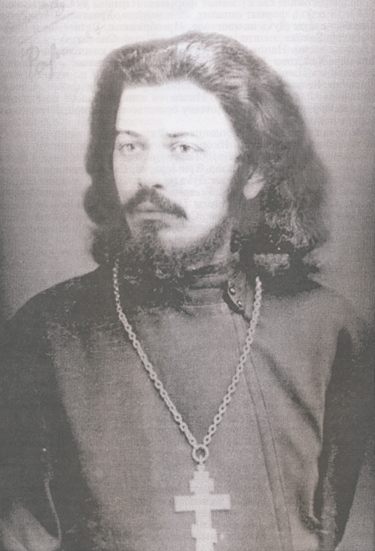

Holy hieromartyr
- Born: Georgije Momčilović; 23 April 1875; Deronje, Austria-Hungary
- Died: 3 September 1941 (aged 66); Požega, Independent State of Croatia
- Venerated in: Eastern Orthodox Church
- Canonized: May 2000, Belgrade by Serbian Orthodox Church
- Feast: 3 September (O.S. 21 August)

Rafailo Momčilović (Serbian Cyrillic: Рафаило Момчиловић; 23 April 1875 – 3 September 1941) was a Serbian Orthodox cleric, abbot of the Šišatovac Monastery, and painter. He was murdered in the Genocide of Serbs in the Independent State of Croatia which took place during the Second World War.

Persecution of Serbs in the Independent State of Croatia began almost immediately after the invasion of the Kingdom of Yugoslavia by Nazi Germany. Ustasha units, administrative commissars and Ustasha youth took up residence in all Serbian Orthodox monasteries throughout Greater Croatia. The monks who had the opportunity to flee, most often fled to either Serbia (from Croatia) or to Montenegro (from Dalmatia and Bosnia and Herzegovina), and those who were caught were sent to internment camps at Jasenovac or killed on the way.

Momčilović was kidnapped by the Ustashe on 25 August 1941 and was tortured until his death on 3 September 1941 at Požega. His burial site has yet to be found.

Today the Serbian Orthodox Church venerates him as a martyr and saint on 3 September.

== Legacy ==
The icons of the iconostasis of Ružica Church in Belgrade were painted by Rafailo Momčilović, who had gained his iconographic skills from Russian iconographers. It is significant to mention that Rafailo donated all his gain to the building of Church of Saint Sava in Belgrade, the work of which had started before World War II. Also, he painted the icons of the iconostasis in the Orthodox church of Gornji Kovilj.

There is an art colony in Vojvodina named after him.

== See also ==
- List of Serbian saints
- List of painters from Serbia
