= Cincture of the Theotokos =

Christian relic

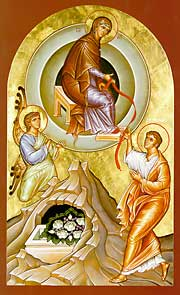
Icon depiction the Theotokos giving her cincture to Thomas the Apostle. Below is a stylized representation of Mary's Tomb, with flowers lying on the sarcophagus.

The Cincture of the Theotokos is believed to be a Christian relic of the Theotokos (Blessed Virgin Mary), now in the Vatopedi monastery on Mount Athos, which is venerated by the Holy Eastern Orthodox Church. The word "cincture" (Greek: zone) is sometimes also translated as "belt", "sash" or "girdle". Its feast day is September 13.

== Tradition ==
According to the Sacred Tradition of the Eastern Orthodox Church, at the time of her Dormition, the Theotokos was buried by the Twelve Apostles in Jerusalem. Three days later, Thomas the Apostle, who had been delayed and unable to attend the funeral, arrived and asked to have one last look at the Virgin Mary. When he and the other apostles arrived at Mary's Tomb, they found that her body was missing. According to some accounts, the Virgin Mary appeared at that time and gave her belt (cincture) to the Apostle Thomas.

Traditionally, the cincture was made by the Virgin Mary herself, out of camelhair.

== Location and changes ==
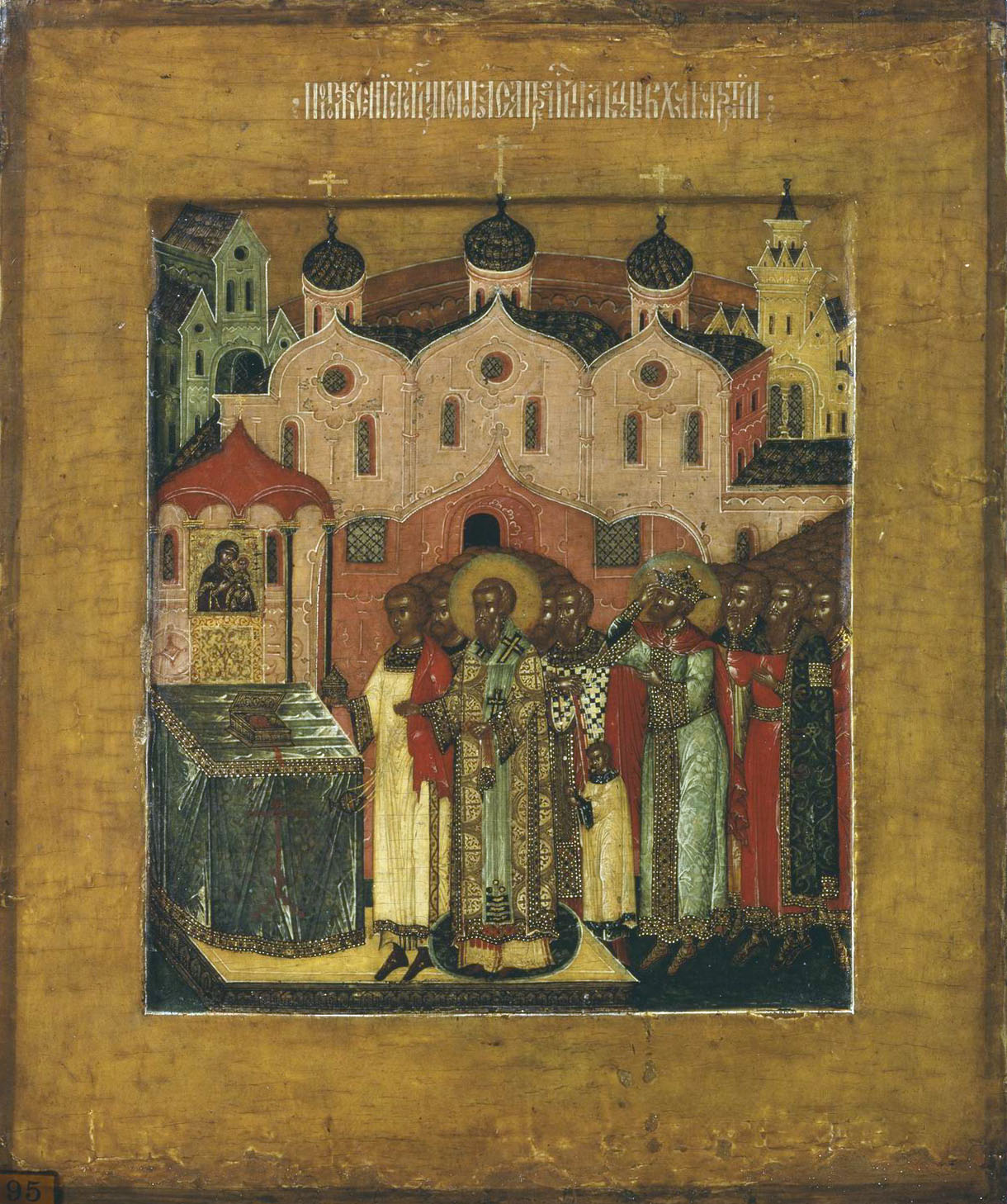
Placing of the Cincture of the Most Holy Theotokos (Russian icon)

The history of the cincture prior to the reign of Justinian in the sixth century is unknown. It was kept at Jerusalem for many years, until it was translated to Constantinople in the 5th century, together with the Robe of the Virgin Mary, and deposited in the Church of St. Mary at Blachernae. This relic was embroidered with gold thread by the Empress Zoe (d. 899), the wife of Emperor Leo VI, in gratitude for a miraculous cure.

During the reign of Emperor Manuel I Komnenos (1143–1180) in the 12th century, an official feast day for the cincture was established on August 31 on the Orthodox liturgical calendar.

Later, the Emperor John VI Kantakouzenos (1347–1355) donated the cincture to the Holy Great Monastery of Vatopedi on Mount Athos, where it remains to this day, in a silver reliquary of newer manufacture which depicts the Monastery. Another part of the belt was gifted by Serbian ruler Lazar Hrebeljanović, and it’s stored in the main church’s altar. The cincture is divided into three parts and very rarely leaves the monastery.

== Public veneration abroad ==
=== Russia ===
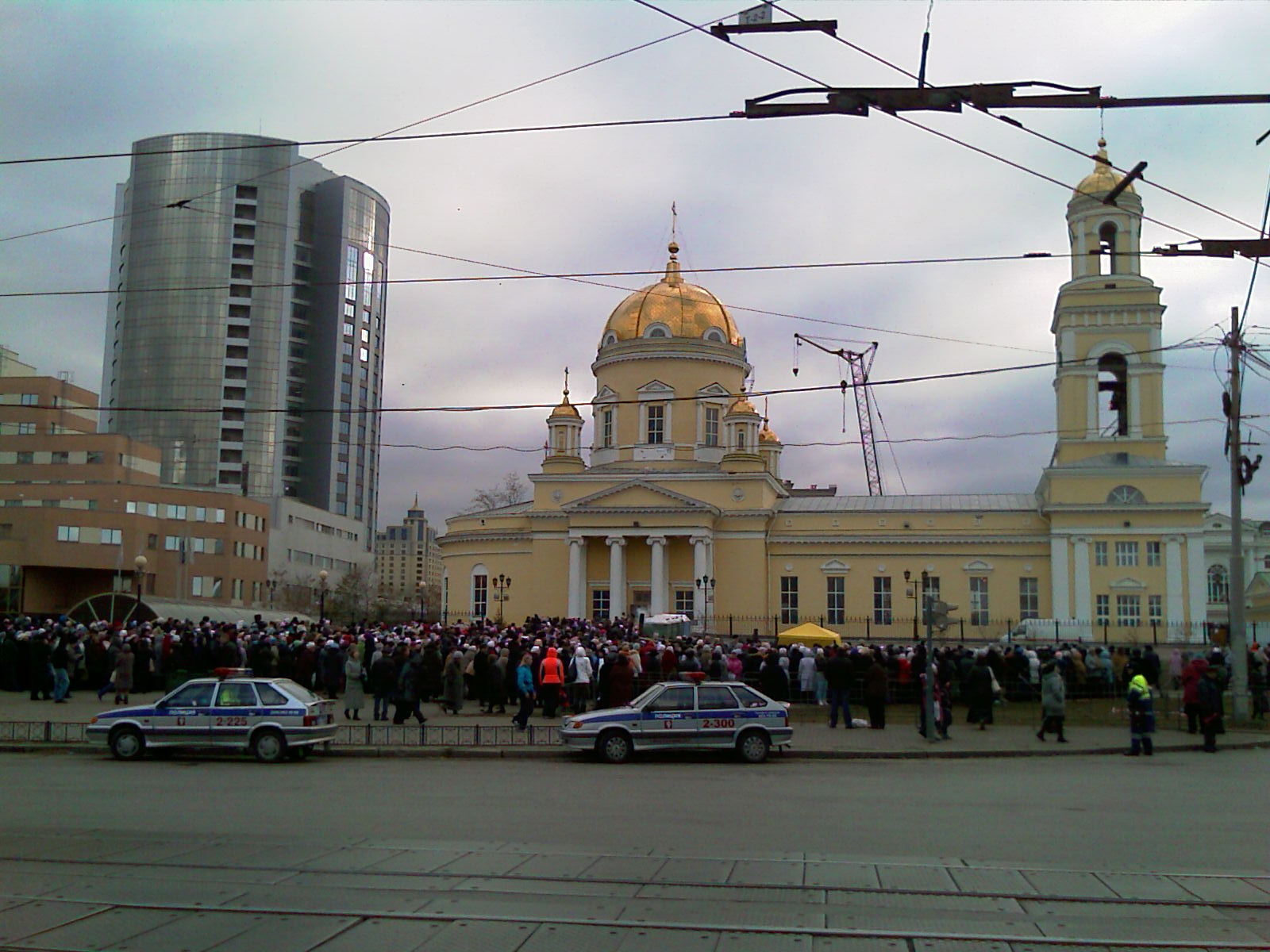
In 2011, pilgrims gather in Ekaterinburg to venerate the Cincture of the Virgin Mary exposed at the city's Trinity Cathedral

In the fall of 2011, the venerated object was brought to Russia to allow Russian Orthodox Christian pilgrims to revere it in different cities. In St. Petersburg it attracted a two kilometer-long line of people to the Resurrection Nunnery on Moskovsky Prospect virtually blocking automotive traffic on adjacent streets, totalling 200,000, with Vladimir Putin being among the first ones. The second city was Yekaterinburg, where about 150,000 people from nearby territories came, including regional governor Alexander Misharin. The next cities were Norilsk (50 thousand, a quarter of Taymyr Peninsula population) and Vladivostok; the relic's further voyage continued until the end of November.

=== Serbia ===
In May 2026, the Cincture was brought from Vatopedi monastery to Belgrade, Serbia, arriving on May 20 ahead of the Ascension Day celebration. It was received at Nikola Tesla Airport by Patriarch Porfirije, state officials, and a large number of faithful, after which it was carried through the streets of the capital during the Ascension Day procession. The relic was placed on display at the Cathedral of Saint Sava on Vračar, where it drew tens of thousands of pilgrims daily from Serbia, the Republika Srpska, and Montenegro. Due to the extraordinary turnout, the Serbian Orthodox Church extended its stay beyond the originally planned date twice, with the cincture ultimately remaining until June 5, 2026, following a request by Patriarch Porfirije and with the blessing of Vatopedi's abbot, Archimandrite Ephrem. The visit was described by the Church as a historic event, as it marked the relic's first presence in Belgrade in several centuries. As is customary in Orthodox tradition, pilgrims were also given small blessed strips of cloth that had been in contact with the cincture.

== See also ==
- Monastery (nunnery) of Kato Panagia Xenia on Mount Othrys in Magnesia, Greece, where part of the cincture is held since 1522
