= Gavrilo I, Serbian Patriarch =

Serbian Patriarch

Saint Gavrilo I

Archbishop of Peć and Serbian Patriarch
- Venerated in: Eastern Orthodox Church
- Church: Serbian Patriarchate of Peć
- See: Patriarchate of Peć Monastery
- Installed: 1648
- Term ended: 1655
- Predecessor: Pajsije I
- Successor: Maksim I

Personal details
- Born: Gavrilo Rajić
- Died: 1659
- Denomination: Eastern Orthodoxy

Gavrilo I was the Patriarch of the Serbian Patriarchate of Peć between 1648 and 1655. He was murdered by Ottomans and therefore venerated by the Eastern Orthodox Church as a hieromartyr. His feast day is celebrated on December 13.

== Life ==
Gavrilo was born around 1605–1610 in the region of Stari Vlah (present-day Serbia) into the noble Rajić family. He entered into church service and became Metropolitan of Smederevo. In 1643, he was elected Metropolitan of Raška. Around 1644, he rebuilt the Monastery of the Holy Archangels in the Kovilje Mountains. After the death of Pajsije I in 1647, Gavrilo was elected new patriarch in 1648.

In 1653, he decided to travel to Russia to ask for material support for the Serbian Patriarchate of Peć. After meeting with Metropolitan Arsenije of Herzegovina on Christmas Eve, he went first to Wallachia and arrived in Târgoviște where he tried to reconcile the Wallachian Prince Matei Basarab with the Cossack Hetman Bohdan Khmelnytsky. From there, Gavrilo traveled to Russia in 1654, taking with him two books for printing: Lives of Serbian Emperors and Patriarchs and Typikon against Latin Heresy of Saint Nil Kabasilas. He was welcomed by Russian Patriarch Nikon and Russian Tsar Michael. He also participated in the famous Moscow Synod in 1658 which approved Nikon's reforms. Since he decided to stay in Russia, he wrote to Serbian metropolitans to elect a new patriarch.

Soon after, he changed his mind and left Russia arriving back in the Ottoman Empire in 1659. Upon return, he was accused by the Turks of being responsible for the Russo-Turkish War. he was also accused of attempting to convert some Turks to Christianity. Brought before the tribunal, he was ordered to embrace Islam. After Gavrilo refused, he was sentenced to death. He was executed in Bursa on July 18, 1659. Presbyter Pavle took his remains and buried them. He was entered on the list of Serbian saints.

== See also ==
- List of saints of the Serbian Orthodox Church
- List of heads of the Serbian Orthodox Church

Eastern Orthodox Church titles
Preceded by Pajsije I	Serbian Patriarch; 1648–1655	Succeeded by Maksim I

== Sources ==
- Ćirković, Sima (2004). The Serbs. Malden: Blackwell Publishing.
- Вуковић, Сава (1996). Српски јерарси од деветог до двадесетог века (Serbian Hierarchs from the 9th to the 20th Century). Београд: Евро.
