= Šišatovac =

Šišatovac Шишатовац (Serbian)
- Village (Selo)
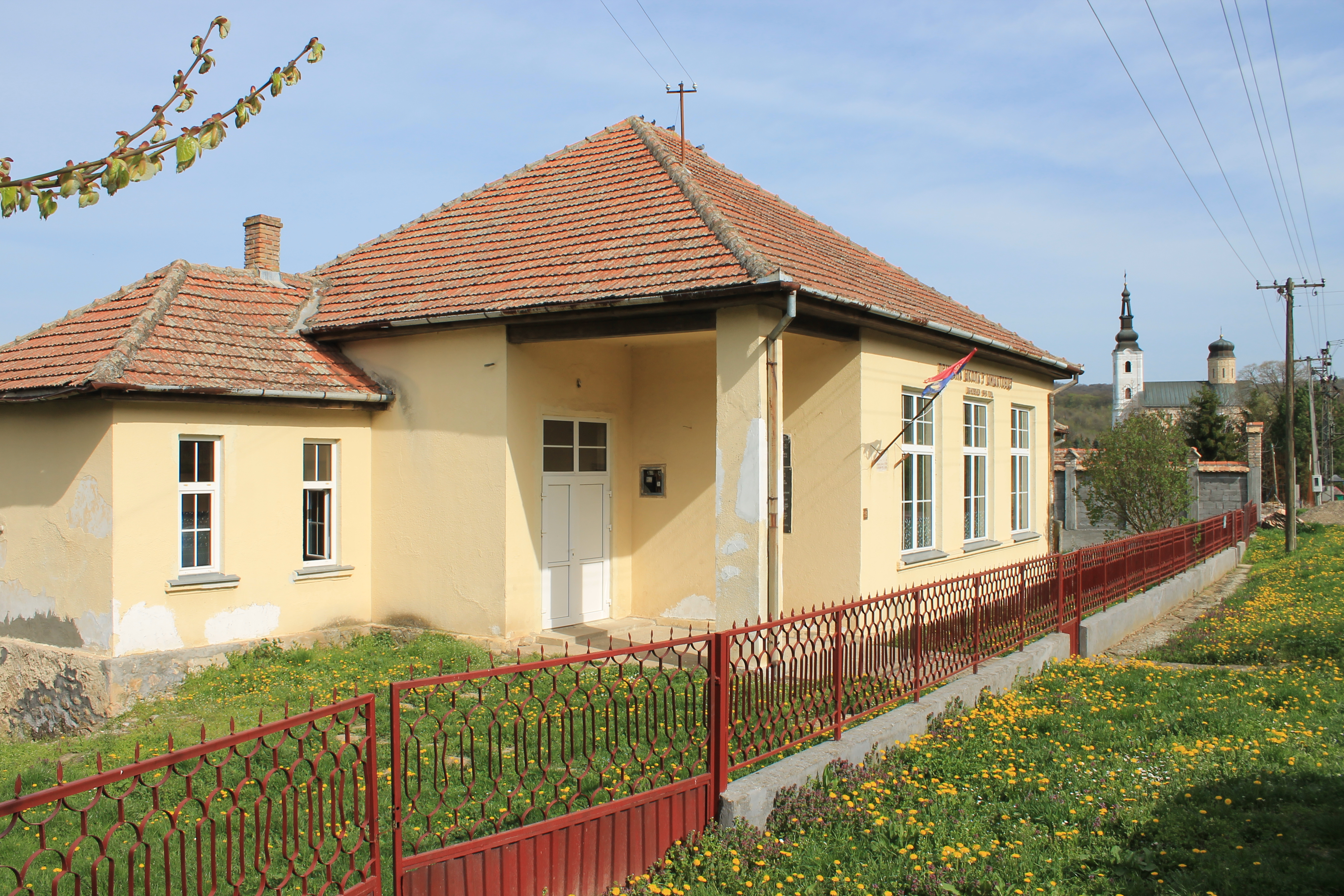

- Location within Vojvodina Location within Serbia Location within Europe
- Coordinates: 45°07′N 19°33′E
- Country: Serbia
- Province: Vojvodina
- Region: Syrmia
- District: Srem
- Municipality: Sremska Mitrovica

Area
  - Total: 8.57 km^{2} (3.31 sq mi)
- Elevation: 195 m (640 ft)

Population (2011)
  - Total: 211
  - Density: 24.6/km^{2} (63.8/sq mi)
- Time zone: UTC+1 (CET)
  - Summer (DST): UTC+2 (CEST)

Šišatovac (Serbian Cyrillic: Шишатовац) is a village located in the municipality of Sremska Mitrovica, Serbia. The village has a Serb ethnic majority and its population numbers 211 people (as of 2011). Near the village is the Šišatovac monastery, one of 16 Serbian Orthodox monasteries on Fruška Gora mountain.

== Historical population ==
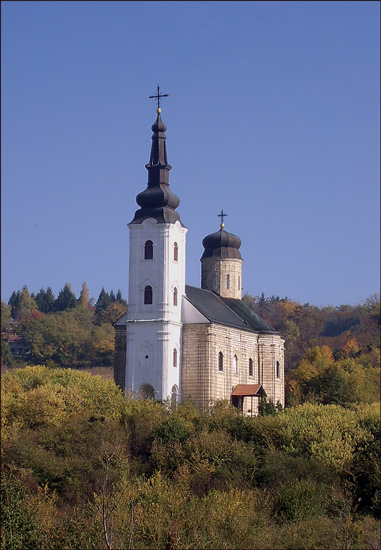
Serbian Orthodox monastery

- Year:Population
- 1961: 281
- 1971: 239
- 1981: 237
- 1991: 217
- 2002: 218
- 2011: 211

== See also ==
- List of places in Serbia
- List of cities, towns and villages in Vojvodina
