= Petkovica Monastery =

Monastery in Serbia

Coordinates: 45°07′34″N 19°32′00″E

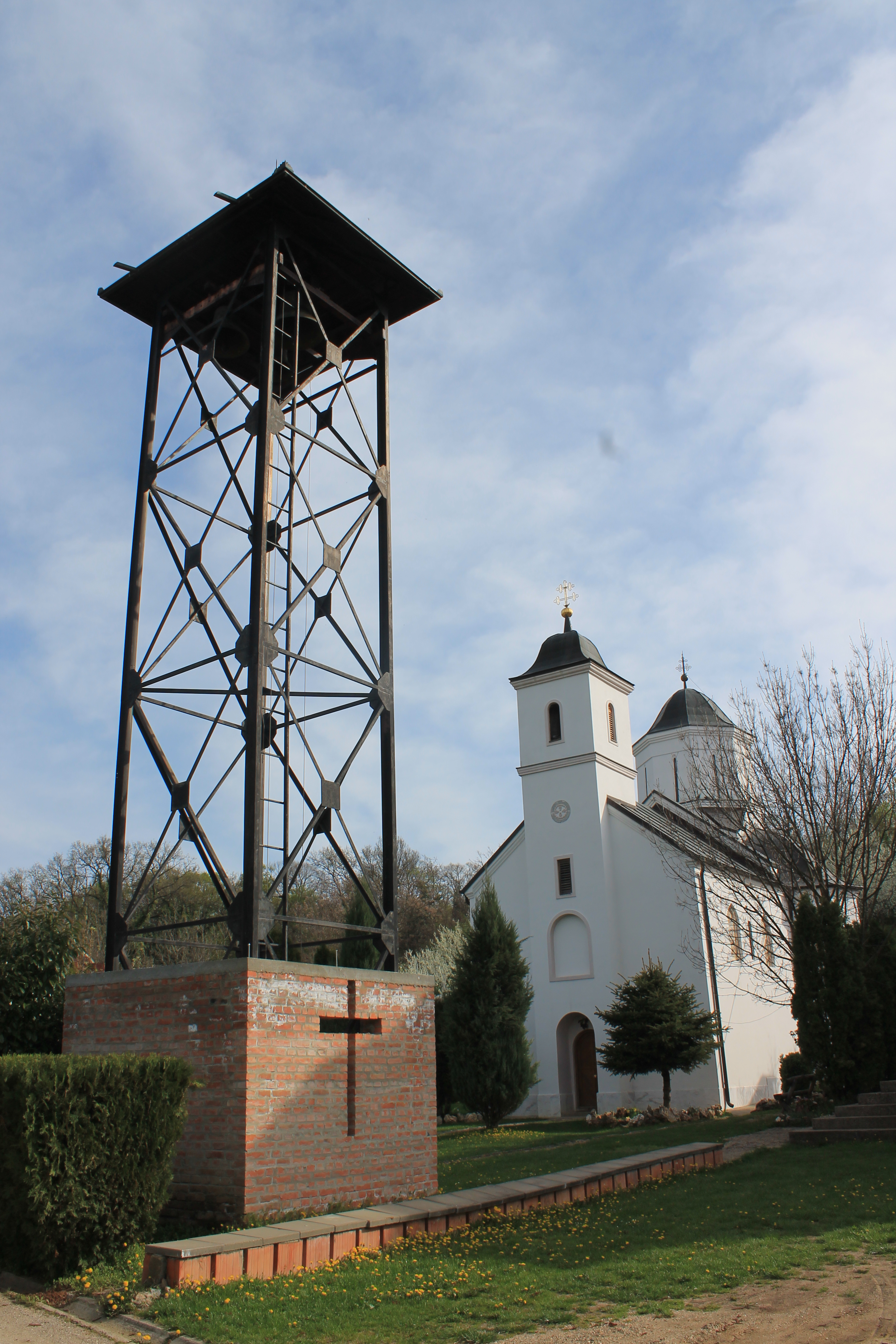
Petkovica Monastery

The Petkovica Monastery (Serbian: Манастир Петковица, romanized: Manastir Petkovica) is a Serbian Orthodox monastery located on Mount Fruška Gora, in the province of Vojvodina, northern Serbia. According to tradition, it was founded by the widow of Stefan Štiljanović, Despotess Jelena. The earliest historical records mentioning the monastery are dated to 1522.

Petkovica Monastery was declared Monument of Culture of Exceptional Importance in 1990, and it is protected by the state.

== See also ==
- List of Serbian Orthodox monasteries
