= Nikon I of Serbia =

Serbian Patriarch

Nikon I was the Patriarch of the Serbian Patriarchate of Peć from 1419 to 1435.

Nikon was on the throne of the Serbian Church during the reign of Stefan Lazarević and after. Stefan had taken a direct interest in selecting Nikon to head the Church. The earliest mention of this Serbian hierarch was noted in 1419 in the "Praise to Prince Lazar" written by Antonije Rafail, a writer of Greek origin who fled to Serbia from the Ottoman Empire. One eulogy-praise was written in 1424 by order of Patriarch Nikon. In the spring of 1426, at a state Sabor held in Srebrenica, Stefan selected and appointed Đurađ Branković as his successor. Patriarch Nikon was also present at the assembly. The following year (1427), the new ruler of Serbia, Đurađ Branković, forbade Serbian Patriarch Nikon to attend the Council of Florence on 6 July 1439 on the grounds that he mistrusted the motives of that council and questioned the principle of papal supremacy.

The last mention of Patriarch Nikon is from 1435 in a record of the manuscript Triodion transcribed by Deacon Arsenije.

== See also ==
- List of saints of the Serbian Orthodox Church
- List of heads of the Serbian Orthodox Church

== Literature ==
- „Никон (патријарх српски)” (Nikon, Serbian Patriarch) Народна енциклопедија (National Encyclopedia). Загреб: Библиографски завод. 1927 (Zagreb: Bibliographic Institute, 1927)
- Вуковић, Сава (Sava Vuković, 1996). Српски јерарси од деветог до двадесетог века (Serbian Hierarch from the Ninth- to the Twentieth-century). Евро, Унирекс, Каленић (Evro, Unireks, Kalenić).
- Поповић, Јелена Р. (Jelena P. Popović, 2014). „Положај Српске Православне Цркве у последњим деценијама српске Деспотовине” (Position of the Serbian Orthodox Church during the last decades of the Despotate, PDF). Богословље: Часопис Православног богословског факултета у Београду (Bogoslovlje: Journal of the Orthodox Theological Faculty in Belgrade), edition 73 (1): 151—160.
