= August 31 (Eastern Orthodox liturgics) =

Day in the Eastern Orthodox liturgical calendar

Eastern Orthodox liturgical calendar
August 30	August 31	September 1
August 31 O.S. ≍ September 13 N.S. August 31 N.S ≍ August 18 O.S.

An Eastern Orthodox cross

August 31 in Eastern Orthodox liturgical calendars is a feast day and a day of commemoration of saints and martyrs. Although some Orthodox churches use the Revised Julian Calendar and others use the traditional Julian calendar, the fixed commemorations for their respective August 31 are broadly the same, no matter which calendar is used. (Note: Despite the dates being the same, the days to which they refer typically differ by 13 days. The notation Old Style or O.S. is sometimes used to indicate a date in the traditional Julian Calendar (the "Old Calendar"). The notation New Style or N.S. indicates a date in the Revised Julian calendar (the "New Calendar").)

== Saints ==
- Holy 7 Virgin-martyrs, at Gaza, by the sword.
- Holy 4 Martyrs, at Perge in Pamphylia, by fire.
- Holy 366 Martyrs, at Nicomedia, by the sword.
- Martyr Phileortus, by the sword.
- Martyrs Menas, Faustus, Andrew and Heraclius. (see also: July 12)
- Saint Diadochos.
- Saint Gennadius I, Patriarch of Constantinople (471) (see also: November 17 )

== Pre-Schism Western saints ==
- Hieromartyr Cyprian, Bishop of Carthage (258) (Note: Thascius Cecilianus Cyprianus was born in North Africa. He became a lawyer, was converted to Orthodoxy and consecrated Bishop of Carthage in 248. He wrote numerous treatises on theological subjects, one of the most important being De Unitate Catholicae Ecclesiae, and wrote numerous letters. He is one of the greatest Fathers of the Church and he was a model of compassion, discretion and pastoral zeal. Cyprian went into hiding during the persecution of Decius but was arrested and beheaded under Valerian.)
- Martyrs Caesidius and Companions, on the shores of Lake Fucino in Italy (3rd century)
- Martyrs Robustian and Mark, venerated in Milan in Italy from early times.
- Saint Paulinus, Bishop of Trier (358) (Note: Born in Gascony in France, he accompanied St Maximinus to Trier in Germany and succeeded him as bishop in 349. He was a brave supporter of St Athanasius and was therefore exiled to Phrygia by the Arian Emperor Constantius in 355. He died in exile but his relics were brought back to Trier in 396.)
- Saint Optatus, Bishop of Auxerre in France (c. 530)
- Saint Barbolenus, fourth Abbot of Bobbio Abbey in Italy (c. 640)
- Saint Eanswythe (Eanswith), Abbess of Folkestone (c. 640) (Note: Granddaughter of King Ethelbert of Kent. She founded the first convent in England on the coast near Folkestone. This was later destroyed by the Danes and swallowed up by the sea. Relics of St Eanswith are venerated in her church in Folkestone to this day.)
- Saint Aidan, Bishop of Lindisfarne, Enlightener of Northumbria (651)
- Saints Cuthburgh (Cuthburga) and Cwenburgh, sisters, Abbesses of Wimborne (c. 725) (Note: Sister of King Ina of Wessex, she became a nun at Barking with St Hildelith. Together with her sister St Cwenburgh, she founded a monastery in Wimborne in Dorset, where she was abbess and was succeeded by her sister. Many nuns from Wimborne helped to enlighten Germany.)
- Saint Wala of Corbie, abbot of Corbie (836)

== Post-Schism Orthodox saints ==
- Saint John II, Metropolitan of Kiev (1089) (Note: "St. John was Metropolitan of Kiev since 1080 and soon earned general profound respect. The Venerable Nestor, his contemporary, says the following about him: "this man is an expert in books, skillful in teaching, merciful to the needy and the widows, kind to everyone, rich and poor, humble and meek". St. John died in the second half of the 11th century. He left some writings, of which the following are famous: "Message of Metropolitan John to Clement, Pope of Old Rome" and "Church Canons", written for Monk James with his explanation of the Canons of the universal (catholic) Church in their application for the Russian Church.")
- Saint Gennadius II Scholarius (Gennadius the Scholar), Patriarch of Constantinople (1372)

=== New martyrs and confessors ===
- New Hieromartyr Alexander Lyubimov, Priest, and Vladimir Dvinsky, Deacon (1918)
- New Hieromartyrs Michael Kosukhin and Myron Rzhepik, Priests (1937)
- New Hieromartyr Demetrius Smirnov (1938)
- Synaxis of the New Martyrs of Jasenovac, Serbia (1941-1945)
- Synaxis of the New Martyrs and Confessors of Ekaterinoslav, Ukraine (2016) (Note: The celebration of the Synaxis was established on April 19, 2016 by the decision of the Holy Synod of the Ukrainian Orthodox Church. The day of the celebration was August 31 (September 13 n.s.) - the day of the Placing of the Honourable Cincture (Sash) of the Most Holy Theotokos.)

== Other commemorations ==
- Placing of the Honourable Cincture (Sash) of the Most Holy Theotokos (395-408) (see also: April 12)
- Restoration of the Church of the Theotokos at the Neorion (port facilities) in Constantinople (c. 920-944) (Note: The restored church of the Theotokos at the Neorion (port facilities) in Constantinople, was founded by the Patrician Antonios, and stood it in the courtyard of his home. When the Patrician Antonios died, the temple was abandoned and left desolate. Later, when Emperor Romanos I Lekapenos (920-944) prepared to demolish it, the foreman in charge of the demolition of the church was physically blocked by apparitions of the Most Holy Theotokos. Therefore the decision was taken to restore the church, and by a Golden Chrysobull, an annual grant was secured for the maintenance of the church. During the restoration, the church itself received a wonder-working grace, and many miracles were experienced by many who prayed there with faith.)
- Repose of Schema-nun Gabriela (Taisiya Alekseevna Filina), of the Holy Trinity Monastery in Kiev (1992) (Note: She was a spiritual daughter of the elders of the Ioninsky Monastery. During the decades when the monastery was closed by Soviet authorities (from 1934 until its reopening in 1992), she was part of the underground network of "Ioninsky" believers, one of the "living links", who preserved its spiritual traditions in secret, often hosting secret gatherings and prayer services in her home. She passed away in August 1992, the very year that the Ioninsky Monastery was officially returned to the Church and resumed services.)

== Icon gallery ==
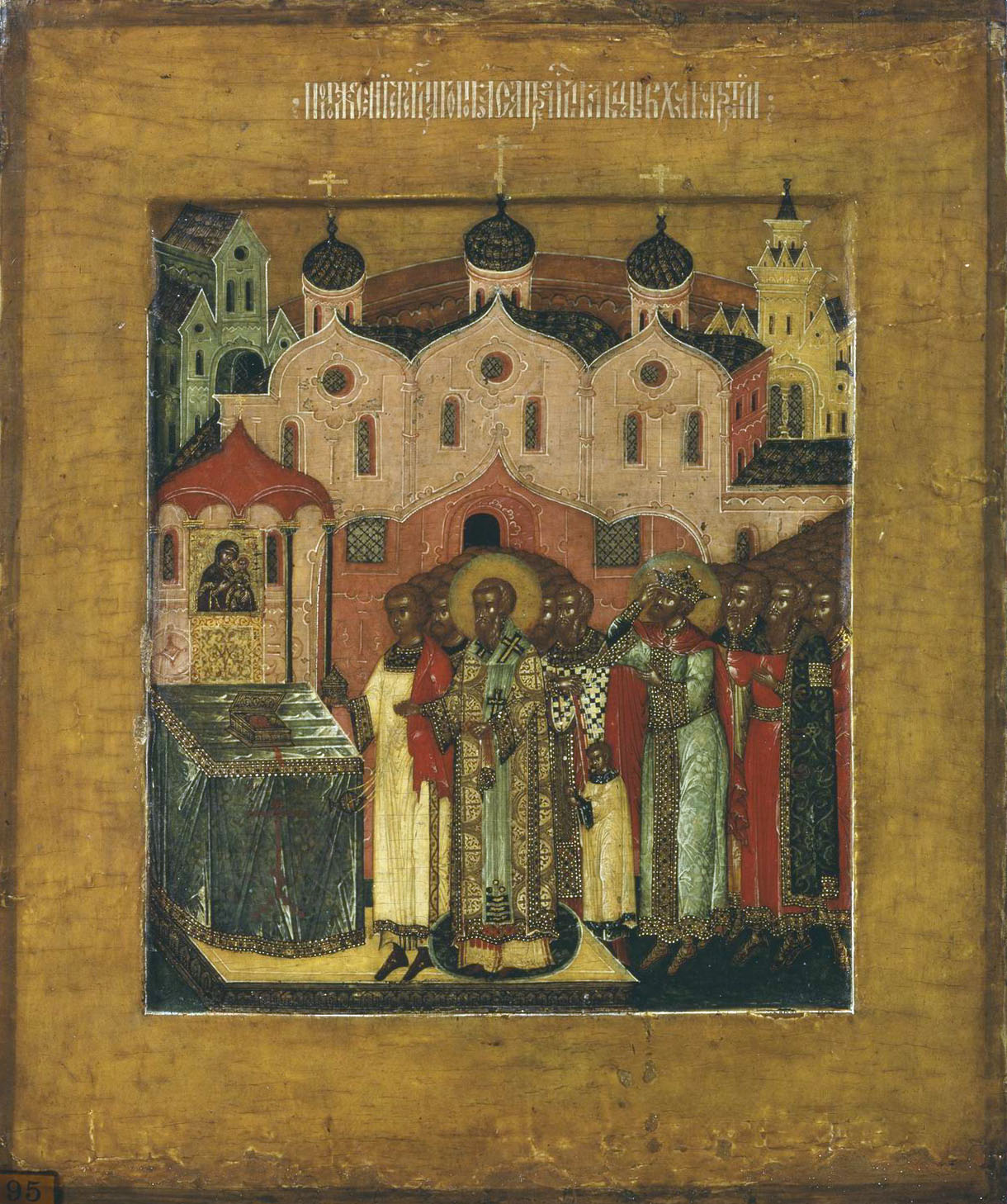
Icon of the feast "Placing of the Cincture of the Theotokos"

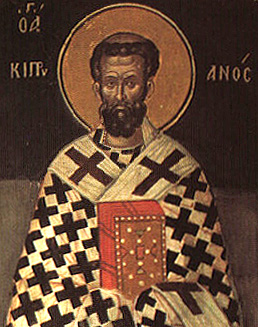
Hieromartyr Cyprian, Bishop of Carthage.

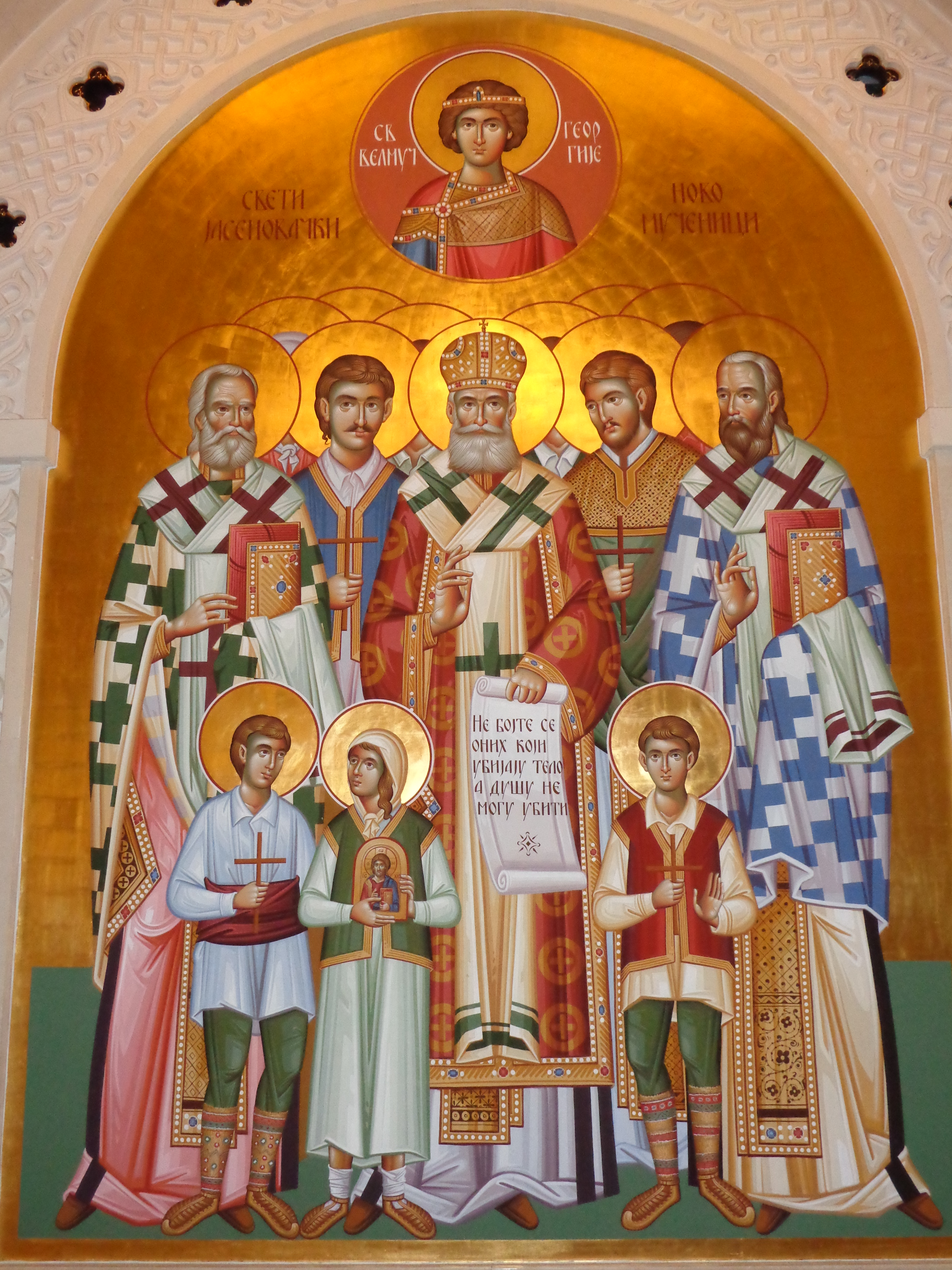
Fresco of the Saint Martyrs of Jasenovac in the crypt of St. Sava Cathedral in Belgrade.

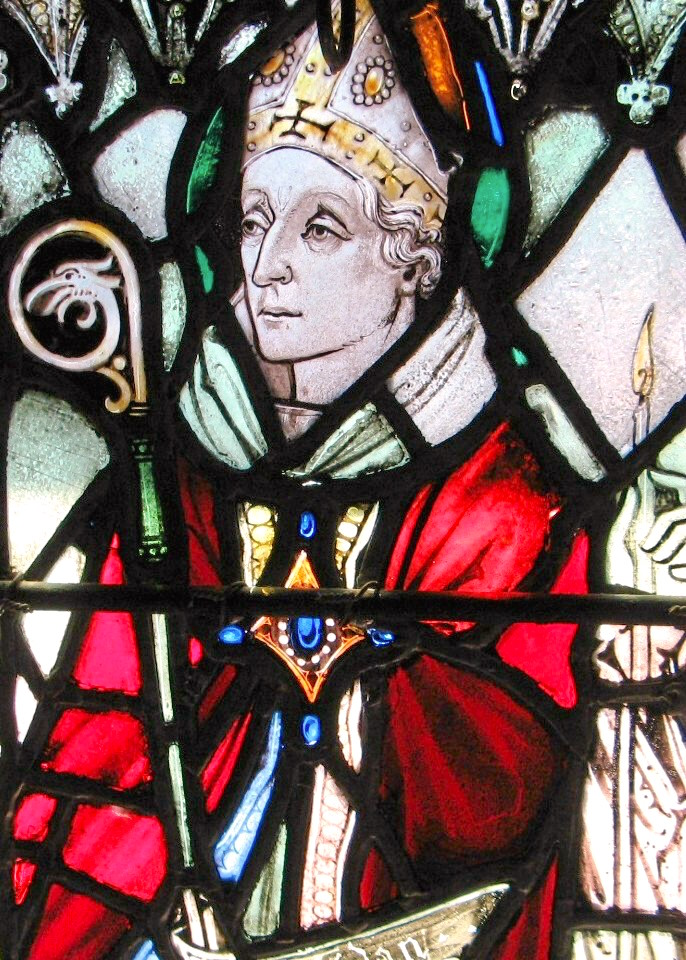
Saint Aidan, Bishop of Lindisfarne, Enlightener of Northumbria.

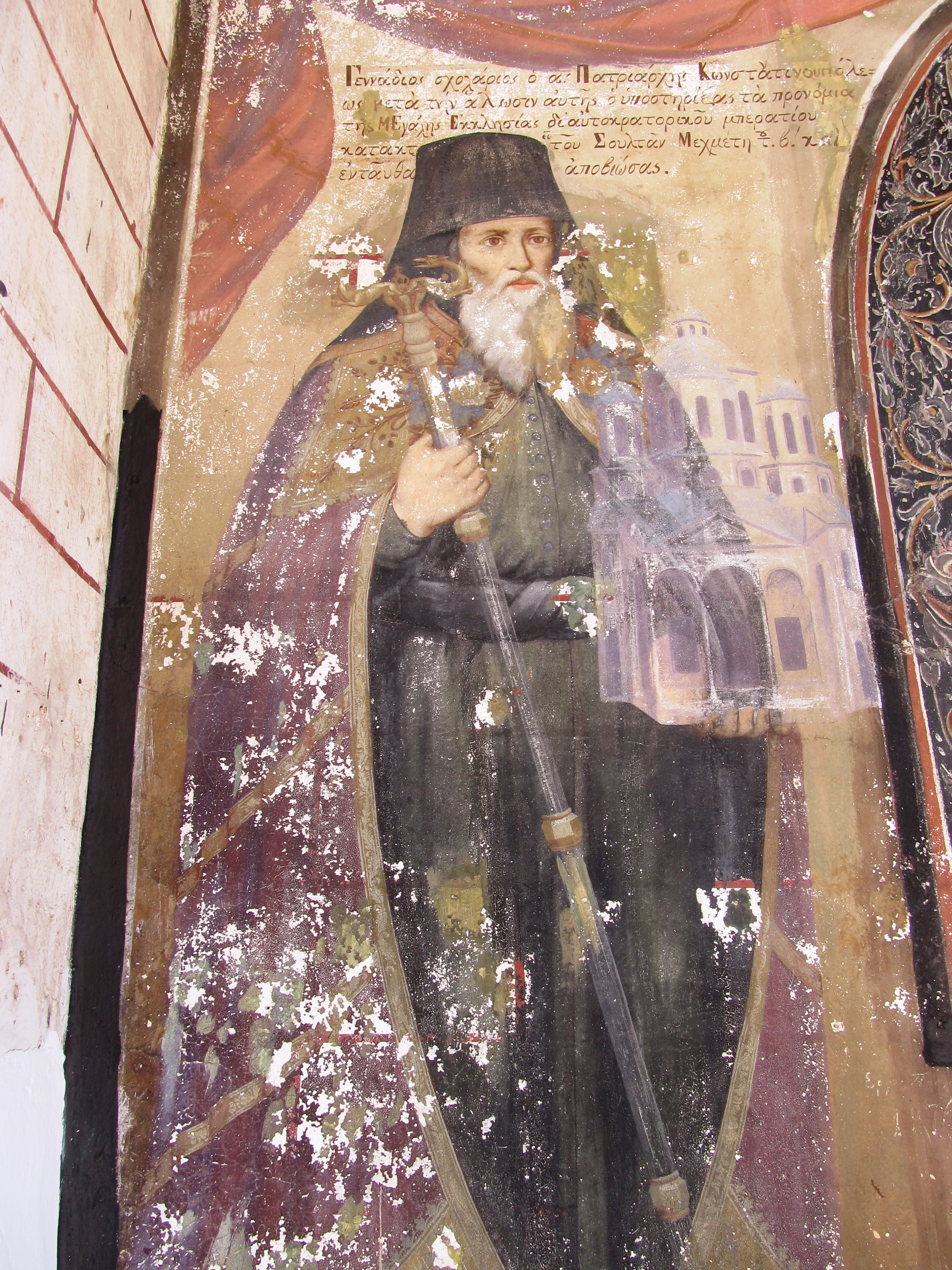
Gennadios II Scholarios - Fresco from the monastery "St. John the Baptist" near Serres, Greece.

Placing of the Honourable Cincture (Sash) of the Most Holy Theotokos.
(School of Veliky Novgorod. Musée des beaux-arts de la ville de Paris)

== Sources ==
- September 13/August 31. Orthodox Calendar (PRAVOSLAVIE.RU).
- September 13 / August 31. HOLY TRINITY RUSSIAN ORTHODOX CHURCH (A parish of the Patriarchate of Moscow).
- August 31. OCA - The Lives of the Saints.
- The Autonomous Orthodox Metropolia of Western Europe and the Americas (ROCOR). St. Hilarion Calendar of Saints for the year of our Lord 2004. St. Hilarion Press (Austin, TX). p. 64.
- August 31. Latin Saints of the Orthodox Patriarchate of Rome.
- The Roman Martyrology. Transl. by the Archbishop of Baltimore. Last Edition, According to the Copy Printed at Rome in 1914. Revised Edition, with the Imprimatur of His Eminence Cardinal Gibbons. Baltimore: John Murphy Company, 1916. pp. 264–265.
- Rev. Richard Stanton. A Menology of England and Wales, or, Brief Memorials of the Ancient British and English Saints Arranged According to the Calendar, Together with the Martyrs of the 16th and 17th Centuries. London: Burns & Oates, 1892. pp. 429–432.

Greek Sources

- Great Synaxaristes: (in Greek) 31 ΑΥΓΟΥΣΤΟΥ. ΜΕΓΑΣ ΣΥΝΑΞΑΡΙΣΤΗΣ.
- (in Greek) Συναξαριστής. 31 Αυγούστου. ECCLESIA.GR. (H ΕΚΚΛΗΣΙΑ ΤΗΣ ΕΛΛΑΔΟΣ).

Russian Sources

- (in Russian) 13 сентября (31 августа). Православная Энциклопедия под редакцией Патриарха Московского и всея Руси Кирилла (электронная версия). (Orthodox Encyclopedia - Pravenc.ru).
- (in Russian) 31 августа по старому стилю / 13 сентября по новому стилю. Русская Православная Церковь - Православный церковный календарь на 2026 год.
