= Maksim I =

Serbian Patriarch

- Archbishop of Peć and Serbian Patriarch
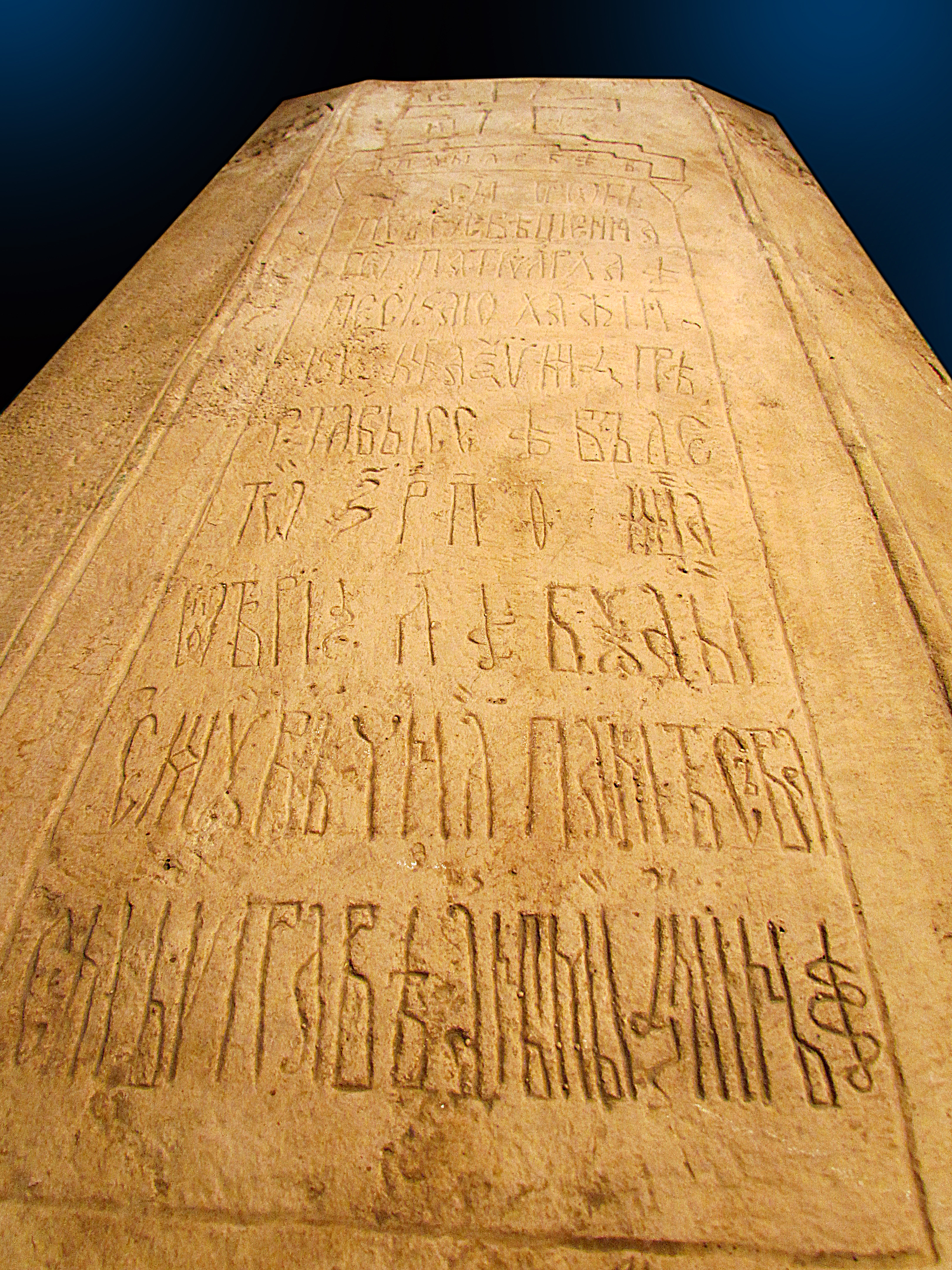
- Lid of Maksim I's sarcophagus
- Church: Serbian Patriarchate of Peć
- See: Patriarchate of Peć Monastery
- Installed: 1655
- Term ended: 1674
- Predecessor: Gavrilo I
- Successor: Arsenije III

Personal details
- Died: 1680 Patriarchate of Peć Monastery
- Denomination: Eastern Orthodoxy

Maksim I, also known as Maksim I Skopljanac (Serbian Cyrillic: Максим I Скопљанац), was the Patriarch of the Serbian Patriarchate of Peć between 1655 and 1674.

== Life ==
Maksim was born in Skopje, thus his nickname. He was serving as the Metropolitan of Raška when his forerunner, Gavrilo I, escaped to Russia fearing Ottoman reprisals for the contacts he held with Sultan's Catholic enemies. Soon Gavrilo I announced that he does not intend to return and that a new patriarch should be chosen. It is, however, not sure if this was his or the initiative of the High Porte. No matter how strange it was to elect a new patriarch while the current was still alive and well, the Serbian Church needed a leader and it set on electing a new patriarch in great haste.

Gavrilo's departure meant the downfall of the party within the Serbian Church which was set on establishing closer ties to the West. The other camp, bound on retaining good relations with the Ottoman authorities came to power. As Metropolitan Maksim was one of the most active proponents of this policy he was chosen to the patriarchal throne in Peć. As a patriarch, Maksim abandoned negotiations with Rome and kept away from establishing closer ties to Russia. Two bishops that continued their ties with foreign powers were soon eliminated.

In order to fortify the faith of his flock but also to gather money needed to pay off heavy Ottoman taxes, Maksim traveled a lot from his seat in Peć, visiting almost the regions of his Patriarchate. In 1662 we find him in Samokov, in 1666 he was in Srem, in 1671 in Ovčar-Kablar gorge. He also ventured out of the domain of his Patriarchate and went collecting donation in Wallachia in 1662. Maksim also went on a pilgrimage to the Holy Land.

Despite Sultan's charter, Serbian bishops tried to get under their control the Franciscan Roman Catholic monasteries in Bosnia-Herzegovina. This was done mostly in order to gain more money. Maksim I was a proponent of this policy and in 1661 upon his visit to Livno he was attacked by furious local Catholics and barely managed to save his life.

At his seat in the Patriarchate of Peć Monastery, Maksim ordered the Church of St Nicholas to be fresco painted (1672) after which he built the new dwellings for the monks (1674).

As a learned man and a lover of books, on his frequent journeys Maksim collected old books and manuscripts. Most of the books he donated to Serbian churches and monasteries.

He got sick at the beginning of March 1669 and a few months later Arsenije Crnojević was chosen to be Metropolitan of Hvosno (sometimes referred to as the Metropolitan of Peć) and became Maksim's coadjutor. He died in October 1680 in Patriarchate of Peć Monastery where he was buried. His sarcophagus, together with his body, still stands in an open porch in front of the church of Saint Nicholas, which he ordered to be repainted. This rather unusual place for a grave is explained by a local legend that says that he chose it himself burdened by guilt of his forerunner's faith.

== See also ==
- List of heads of the Serbian Orthodox Church

Eastern Orthodox Church titles
| Preceded by Gavrilo I | Serbian Patriarch; 1655–1674 | Succeeded by Arsenije III |

== Bibliography ==
- Ćirković, Sima (2004). The Serbs. Malden: Blackwell Publishing. ISBN 9781405142915.
- Fotić, Aleksandar (2008). "Serbian Orthodox Church". Encyclopedia of the Ottoman Empire. New York: Infobase Publishing. pp. 519–520. ISBN 9781438110257.
- Kašić, Dušan, ed. (1965). Serbian Orthodox Church: Its past and present. Vol. 1. Belgrade: Serbian Orthodox Church.
- Pavlovich, Paul (1989). The History of the Serbian Orthodox Church. Serbian Heritage Books. ISBN 9780969133124.
- Слијепчевић, Ђоко М. (1962). Историја Српске православне цркве (History of the Serbian Orthodox Church). Vol. књ. 1. Минхен: Искра.
- Вуковић, Сава (1996). Српски јерарси од деветог до двадесетог века (Serbian Hierarchs from the 9th to the 20th Century). Београд: Евро.
- Olga Zirojević, Srbija pod turskom vlašću 1459-1804, Belgrade 2007
