= Euthymius of Dečani =

Saint Euthymius of Dečani

Martyr, Venerable
- Honored in: Eastern Orthodox Church
- Feast: 24 November (NS)

Venerable Jeftimije of Dečani also Jeftimije Dečanski (Serbian: преподобни Јефтимије Дечански; 16th century) was a Serbian monk who became a martyr after the Ottomans invaded Medieval Serbia in the 16th century and he died a martyr's death.

Jeftimije of Dečani is celebrated on 24 November (New Style) and 11 November (Old Style) according to the calendar of the Serbian Orthodox Church.

== See also ==
- List of Serbian saints
