= September 13 (Eastern Orthodox liturgics) =

Day in the Eastern Orthodox liturgical calendar

Eastern Orthodox liturgical calendar
September 12	September 13	September 14
September 13 O.S. ≍ September 26 N.S. September 13 N.S ≍ August 31 O.S.

An Eastern Orthodox cross

September 13 in Eastern Orthodox liturgical calendars is a feast day and a day of commemoration of saints and martyrs. Although some Orthodox churches use the Revised Julian Calendar and others use the traditional Julian calendar, the fixed commemorations for their respective September 13 are broadly the same, no matter which calendar is used. (Note: Despite the dates being the same, the days to which they refer typically differ by 13 days. The notation Old Style or O.S. is sometimes used to indicate a date in the traditional Julian Calendar (the "Old Calendar"). The notation New Style or N.S. indicates a date in the Revised Julian calendar (the "New Calendar").)

== Feasts ==
- Forefeast of the Exaltation of the Cross.

== Saints ==
- Hieromartyr Cornelius the Centurion (1st century) (Note: Name days celebrated today include: Cornelius (Κορνήλιος); Cornelia (Κορνηλία).)
- Saint Aristides the Athenian, martyr (120) (Note: Name days celebrated today include: Aristides (Ἀριστείδης).)
- Martyrs Serapion, Cronides, and Leontius, of Alexandria (c. 237) (see also: September 11)
- Martyr Straton of Nicomedia (3rd century) (Note: Certain Synaxaria show his feast day on September 9 as well.)
- Martyr Seleucus of Galatia (320)
- Martyrs Elias, Zoticus, Lucian, Valerian, Macrobius, and Gordian at Tomis in Moesia (320)
- Saint Eulogius I, Patriarch of Alexandria (608) (Note: "At Alexandria, St. Eulogius, a bishop, celebrated for learning and sanctity.") (see also: February 13)
- Venerable Peter of Atroa, in Bithynia (or of Agrea) (early 9th century) (see also: January 3)

== Pre-Schism Western saints ==
- Saint Philip, the father of St Eugenia of Rome, in whose home Sts Protus and Hyacinth were employed (3rd century) (Note: "AT Alexandria, the birthday of blessed Philip, father of the virgin St. Eugenia. Resigning the dignity of prefect of Egypt, he obtained the grace of baptism. His successor, the prefect Terentius, caused him to be pierced through the throat with a sword, whilst he was praying.")
- Saint Litorius, Bishop of Tours (370)
- Saint Maurilius of Angers, Bishop of Angers (c. 430) (Note: Born in Milan in Italy, he moved to France where he became a disciple of St Martin of Tours. About the year 407 he was consecrated Bishop of Angers.) (Note: "At Angers, in France, St. Mauritius, a bishop, renowned for numberless miracles.")
- Saint Nectarius, Bishop of Autun in France, and a friend of St Germanus of Paris (c. 550) (Note: See: (in French) Nectaire d'Autun. Wikipédia. (French Wikipedia).)
- Saint Amatus (Amat, Amé, Aimé, Amado), first abbot of Remiremont Abbey (627) (Note: Born in Grenoble in France, he became a monk at the monastery of St Maurice of Agaunum in Switzerland, where he lived as a hermit for over thirty years. St Eustace encouraged him to move to Luxeuil and here he converted St Romaricus. When this noble founded the monastery of Remiremont in 620, Amatus became the first abbot.) (Note: "In the monastery of Remiremont in France, St. Amatus, priest and abbot, illustrious for the virtue of abstinence and the gift of miracles.")
- Saint Venerius the Hermit, a hermit, then abbot on the Island of Tino in the Gulf of Genoa in Italy (c. 630) (Note: "The same day, St. Venerius, confessor, a man of admirable sanctity, who led an eremitical life in the island of Palmaria.")
- Saint Columbinus, successor of St Deicola as Abbot of Lure in France (c. 680)
- Saint Amatus (Aimé), Abbot of Agaunum, who became the tenth Bishop of Sion in Valais in Switzerland (690) (Note: As a result of a false accusation, he was exiled to the monastery of Péronne and then to Breuil near Arras in the north of France, where he lived as one of the monks.) (Note: "At Sens, St. Amatus, bishop and confessor.")
- Saint Barsenorius, Abbot of La-Croix-Saint-Leuffroi in France (7th century) (Note: His relics are in Fécamp.)
- Saint Hedwig (Haduwy), Abbess of Herford Abbey in Westphalia in Germany (c. 887)
- Saint Wilfrida of Wilton (Wulfthryth), Abbess of Wilton Abbey (c. 988) (Note: Mother of St Edith of Wilton in England. After Edith's birth, Wilfrida went to Wilton where she became a nun. As a nun, and later as abbess, she led a repentant and edifying life.)

== Post-Schism Orthodox saints ==
- Saint John of Prislop, Romania (15th-16th centuries)
- Saint Cornelius of Padan-Olonets, disciple of St. Alexander of Svir, and with him Sts. Dionysius and Misael (16th century)
- Saint Meletius I Pegas, Patriarch of Alexandria (1601)
- Great-martyr Ketevan, Queen of Kakheti, Georgia (1624)
- Venerable Hierotheus of Kalamata (Hierotheos the New), monk of Iveron Monastery, Mt. Athos (1745)

=== New martyrs and confessors ===
- New Hieromartyrs Stephan Kostogryz and Alexander Aksenov, Priests (1937)
- New Hieromartyr Nicholas Vasyukovich, Deacon (1937)

== Other commemorations ==
- Commemoration of the Founding of the Church of the Resurrection (the Holy Sepulchre) at Jerusalem (335)
- Icon of the Theotokos "Dubovich".
- Repose of Monk Dorotheus, last hermit of the Roslavl Forests (1866)

== Icon gallery ==
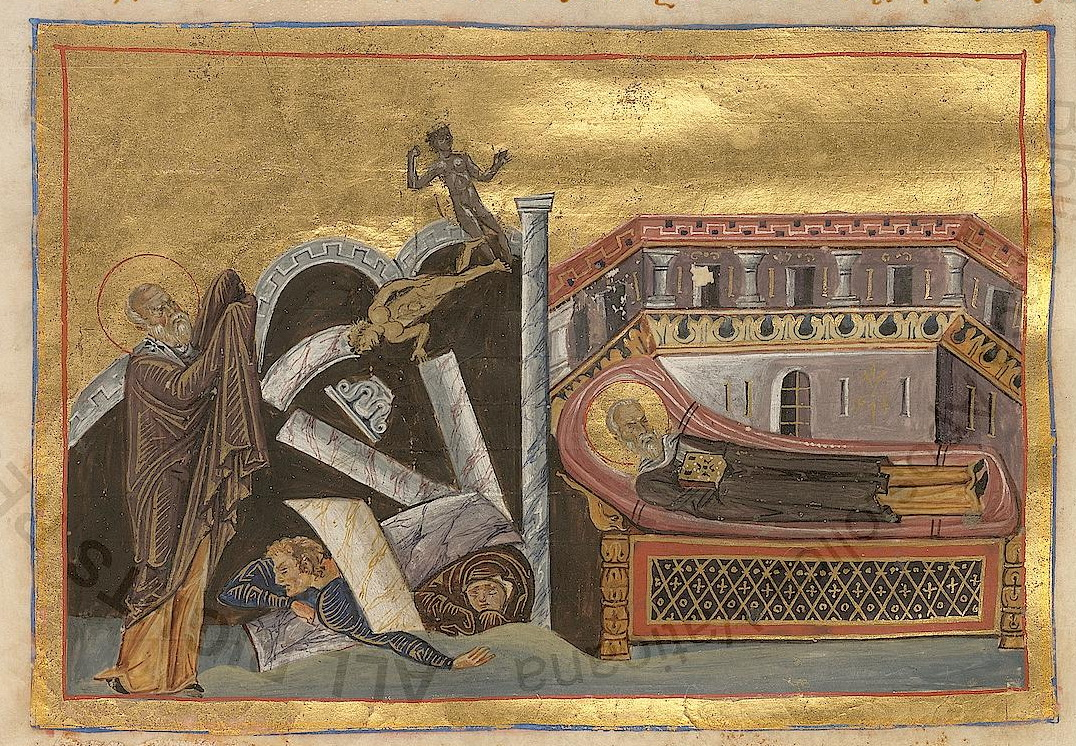
Cornelius the Centurion and destruction of the pagan temple at Skepsis.
(Menologion of Basil II, 10th century).

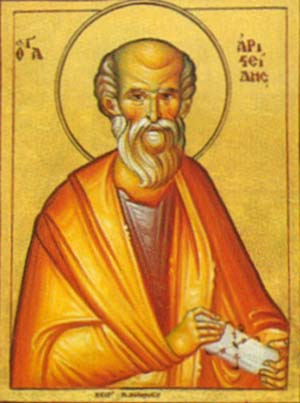
St. Aristides the Athenian.

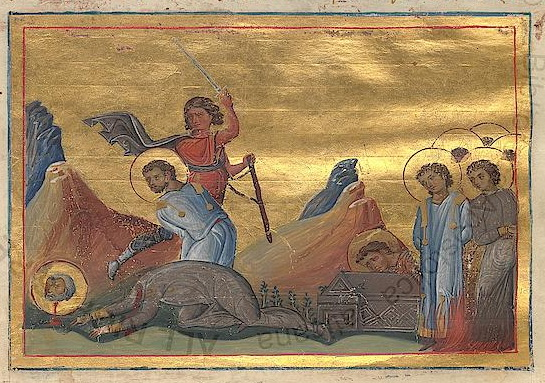
Martyrs Elias, Zoticus, Lucian, Valerian, Macrobius, and Gordian at Tomis in Moesia.
(Menologion of Basil II, 10th century).

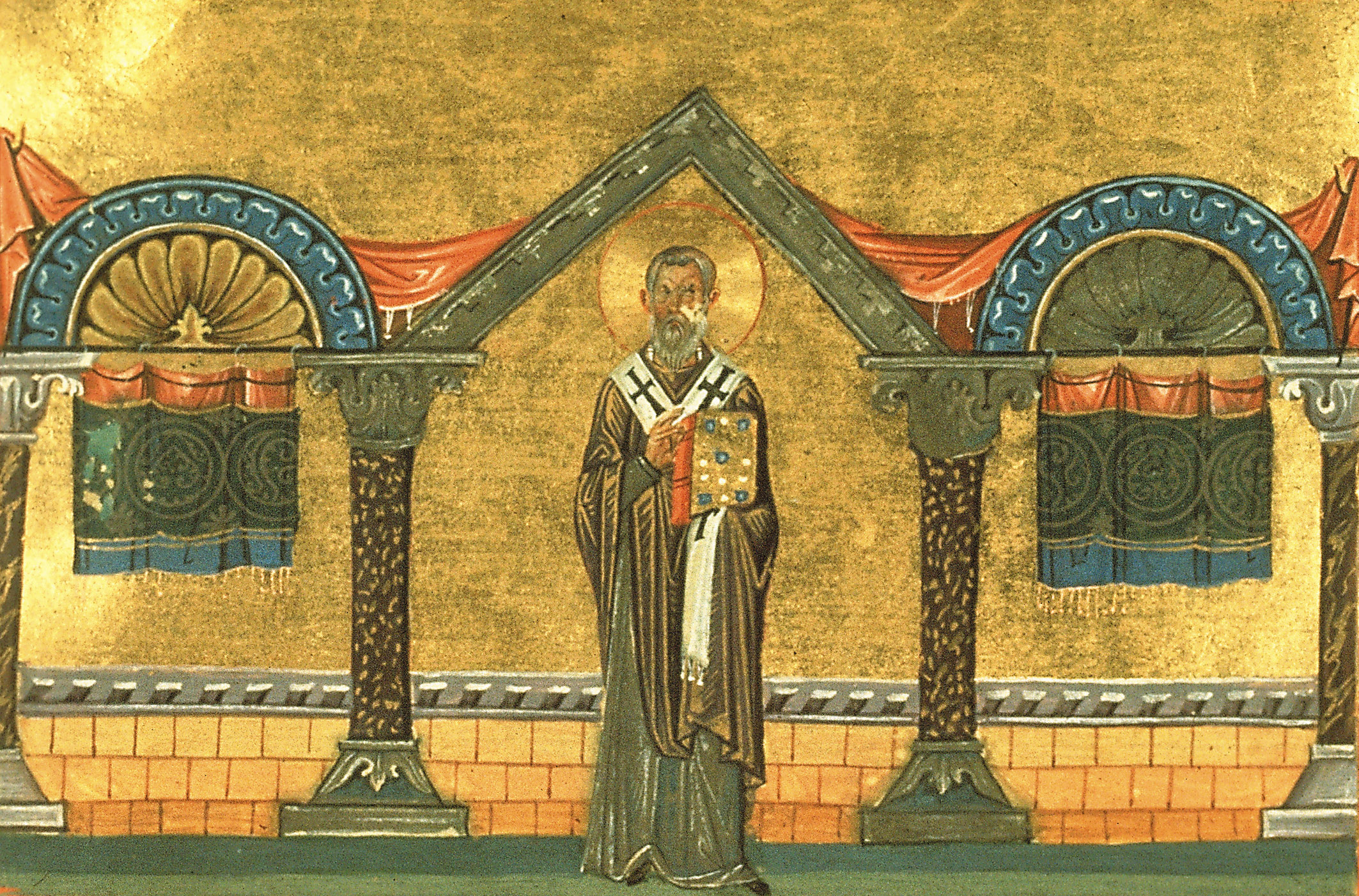
St. Eulogius I, Patriarch of Alexandria.
(Menologion of Basil II, 10th century).

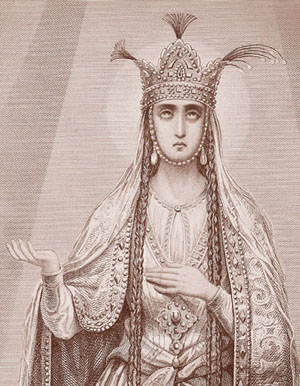
Great-martyr Ketevan, Queen of Georgia.

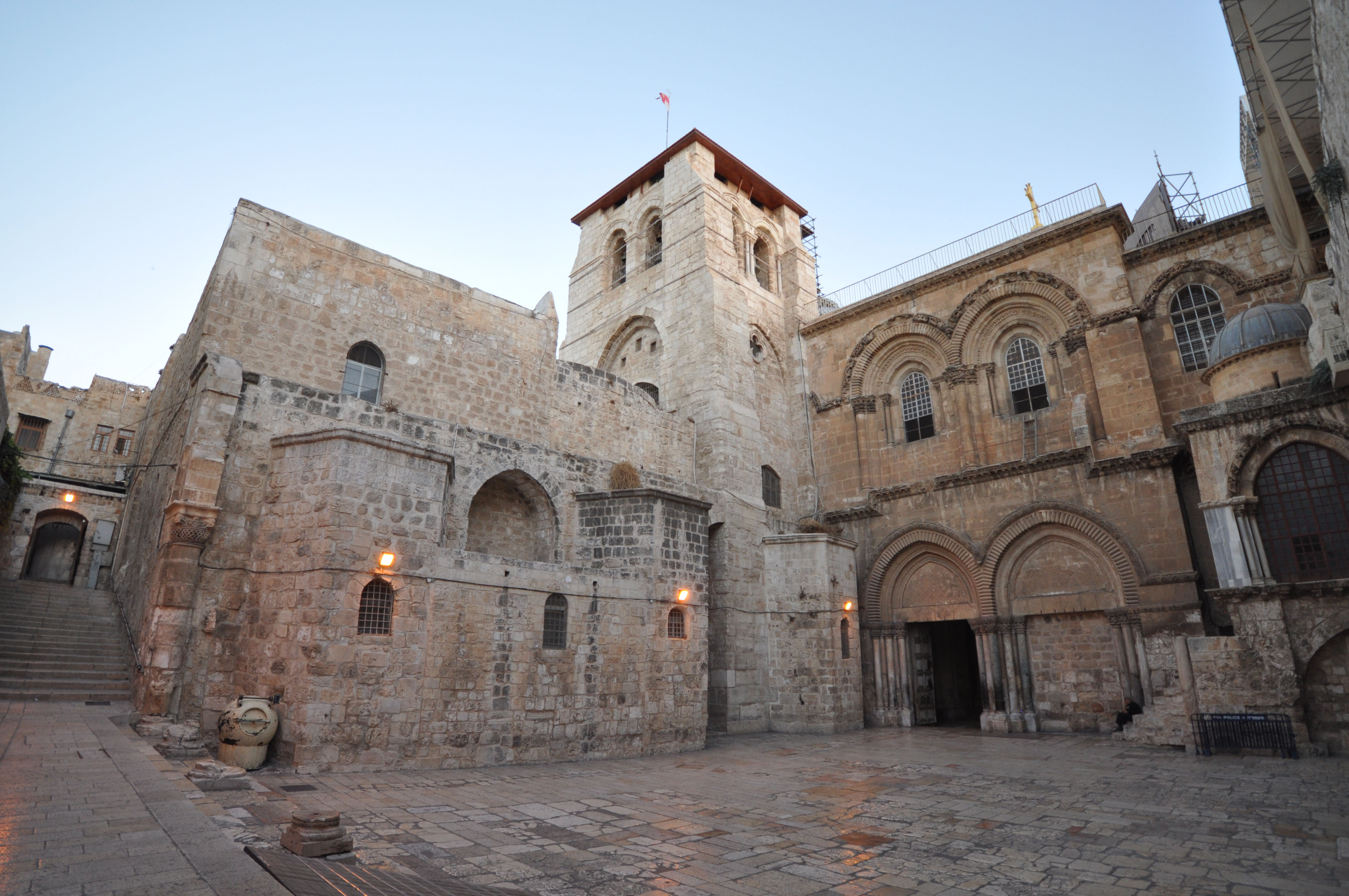
Church of the Resurrection (the Holy Sepulchre) at Jerusalem.

== Sources ==
- September 13/September 26. Orthodox Calendar (PRAVOSLAVIE.RU).
- September 26 / September 13. HOLY TRINITY RUSSIAN ORTHODOX CHURCH (A parish of the Patriarchate of Moscow).
- September 13. OCA - The Lives of the Saints.
- The Autonomous Orthodox Metropolia of Western Europe and the Americas (ROCOR). St. Hilarion Calendar of Saints for the year of our Lord 2004. St. Hilarion Press (Austin, TX). p. 68.
- The Thirteenth Day of the Month of September. Orthodoxy in China.
- September 13. Latin Saints of the Orthodox Patriarchate of Rome.
- The Roman Martyrology. Transl. by the Archbishop of Baltimore. Last Edition, According to the Copy Printed at Rome in 1914. Revised Edition, with the Imprimatur of His Eminence Cardinal Gibbons. Baltimore: John Murphy Company, 1916. pp. 281–282.
- Rev. Richard Stanton. A Menology of England and Wales, or, Brief Memorials of the Ancient British and English Saints Arranged According to the Calendar, Together with the Martyrs of the 16th and 17th Centuries. London: Burns & Oates, 1892. p. 447.

Greek Sources

- Great Synaxaristes: (in Greek) 13 ΣΕΠΤΕΜΒΡΙΟΥ. ΜΕΓΑΣ ΣΥΝΑΞΑΡΙΣΤΗΣ.
- (in Greek) Συναξαριστής. 13 Σεπτεμβρίου. ECCLESIA.GR. (H ΕΚΚΛΗΣΙΑ ΤΗΣ ΕΛΛΑΔΟΣ).
- (in Greek) 13/09/2026. Ορθόδοξος Συναξαριστής.

Russian Sources

- (in Russian) 26 сентября (13 сентября). Православная Энциклопедия под редакцией Патриарха Московского и всея Руси Кирилла (электронная версия). (Orthodox Encyclopedia - Pravenc.ru).
- (in Russian) 13 сентября по старому стилю / 26 сентября по новому стилю. Русская Православная Церковь - Православный церковный календарь на 2026 год.
