= Momčilo Grgurević =

Serbian saint

Saint Momčilo Grgurević Момчило Гргуревић
- Born: 1906
- Died: 29 November 1945
- Venerated in: Eastern Orthodox Church
- Feast: 29 november

Momčilo Grgurević (Serbian Cyrillic: Момчило Гргуревић; 1906 - 1945) was a Serbian orthodox priest of the Metropolitanate of Dabar-Bosnia who was canonized as a martyr.

== Biography ==
Grgurević was born in 1906 in Foča (today in Republika Srpska). He graduated from the Faculty of Theology in Sarajevo in 1928.

In 1929, was ordained to the rank of deacon and soon to the rank of priest. He served in Čelebići until his martyrdom on 29 November 1945.

During the genocide of Serbs in the Independent State of Croatia in World War II, his liquidation was repeatedly planned and attempted.

He was killed on the night of 29 November 1945. There are two different versions of how he was killed. According to one version of the events, Grgurević was wounded by a trio of Ustaše who then slit his throat. Another version posits that he was still alive when he was wounded and that his head was decapitated by a hacksaw. His head was then taken as a trophy and thrown inside the municipal building in Čelebići.

After 45 years, his son Vasilije transferred Momcilo's earthly remains and buried them next to the Church in Čelebići.

== Literature ==
- Savo B. Jović, "Imprisoned Church", The Suffering of the Clergy of the Serbian Orthodox Church from 1945 to 1985
