= Visarion Saraj =

Serbian Orthodox Cleric

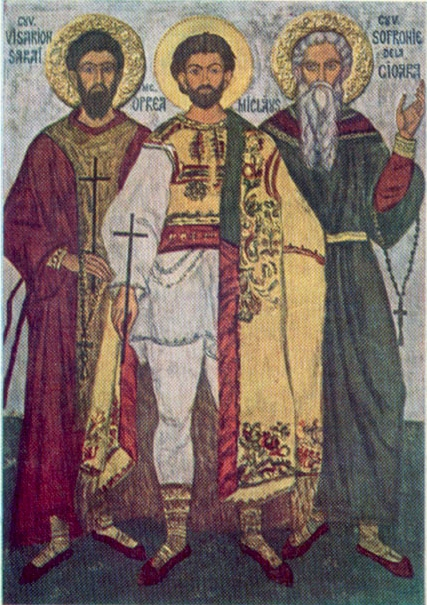
Romanian Saints (from left to right): Visarion Sarai, Nicolae Oprea Miclăuş, Sofronie of Cioara

Visarion Saraj also known as Visarion Sarai (1714–1744) was an Orthodox cleric who was targeted by members of the Habsburg Dynasty for speaking his mind which led to him being imprisoned in Deva and then sent to a jail in Timișoara and from there to Sankt Ruprecht an der Raab before being tortured to death in the dungeon of the Kufstein Fortress in the Kaiser Mountains of the city of Tyrol. Because of this, the Holy Synods of the Romanian Orthodox Church and the Serbian Orthodox Church introduced Vissarion in the calendar of their Saints.

== See also ==
- List of Serbian saints
