= Holy Martyrs of Jasenovac =

Saint Orthodox Martrys who died in Jasenovac Concentration Camp

Holy New Martyrs of Jasenovac
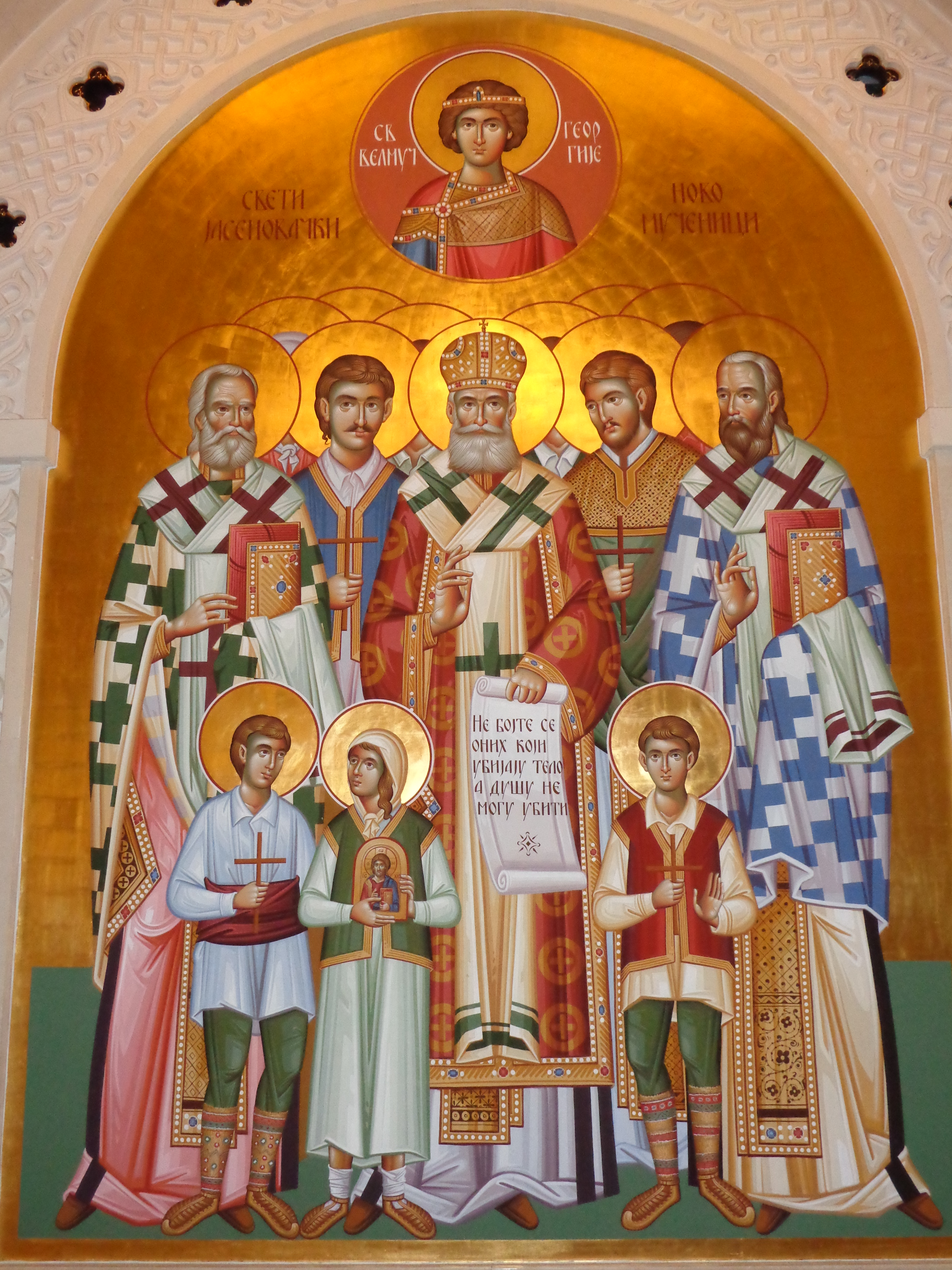
- Fresco of the holy martyrs of Jasenovac in the crypt of St. Sava Cathedral in Belgrade

New Martyrs Confessors of the Faith
- Died: Jasenovac Concentration Camp, Jasenovac, Independent State of Croatia
- Venerated in: Eastern Orthodox Church
- Major shrine: Jasenovac Monastery
- Feast: 31 August (Julian Calendar); 13 September (Revised Julian Calendar / Gregorian Calendar)
- Attributes: Profession of faith Dove; Martyr's palm Religious habit
- Patronage: Nuns, Priests, Serbia, Bosnia and Herzegovina (Republika Srpska), Croatian Serbs, Persecuted Eastern Orthodox Christians

The Holy Martyrs of Jasenovac (Serbian: Свети Мученици Јасеновачки; Various dates - 1941–1945) are Eastern Orthodox Christian saints and martyrs who were murdered by the Croatian fascist organisation Ustaše in a genocide campaign against Serbs in Jasenovac Concentration Camp in the Independent State of Croatia. Their feast day is on 31 August (N.S. 13 September).

== Veneration ==
The Martyrs of Jasenovac were first memorialised in church calendars by the Serbian Orthodox Diocese in USA and Canada in 1980.

In the calendars printed by the then Diocese of America and Canada from New Gračanica near Chicago, the feast day of the Jasenovac Martyrs was also published.

Later, after the healing of that great church wound, grace by Patriarch Pavle, Metropolitan Irinej and other archbishops, the Holy Synod of Bishops of the Serbian Orthodox Church decided that their memory can be entered and celebrated in calendars printed by Serbian bishops abroad.

Since 2010, the feast day of the Holy New Martyrs of Jasenovac has been binding on the entire Serbian Orthodox Church.

On 16 April, 2010, the Holy Synod of Bishops of the Serbian Orthodox Church decided to canonise the Holy New Martyrs of Jasenovac, with their feast day on 31 August on the Julian Calendar

The New Martyrs of Jasenovac are mainly venerated and liturgically celebrated in the Jasenovac Monastery.

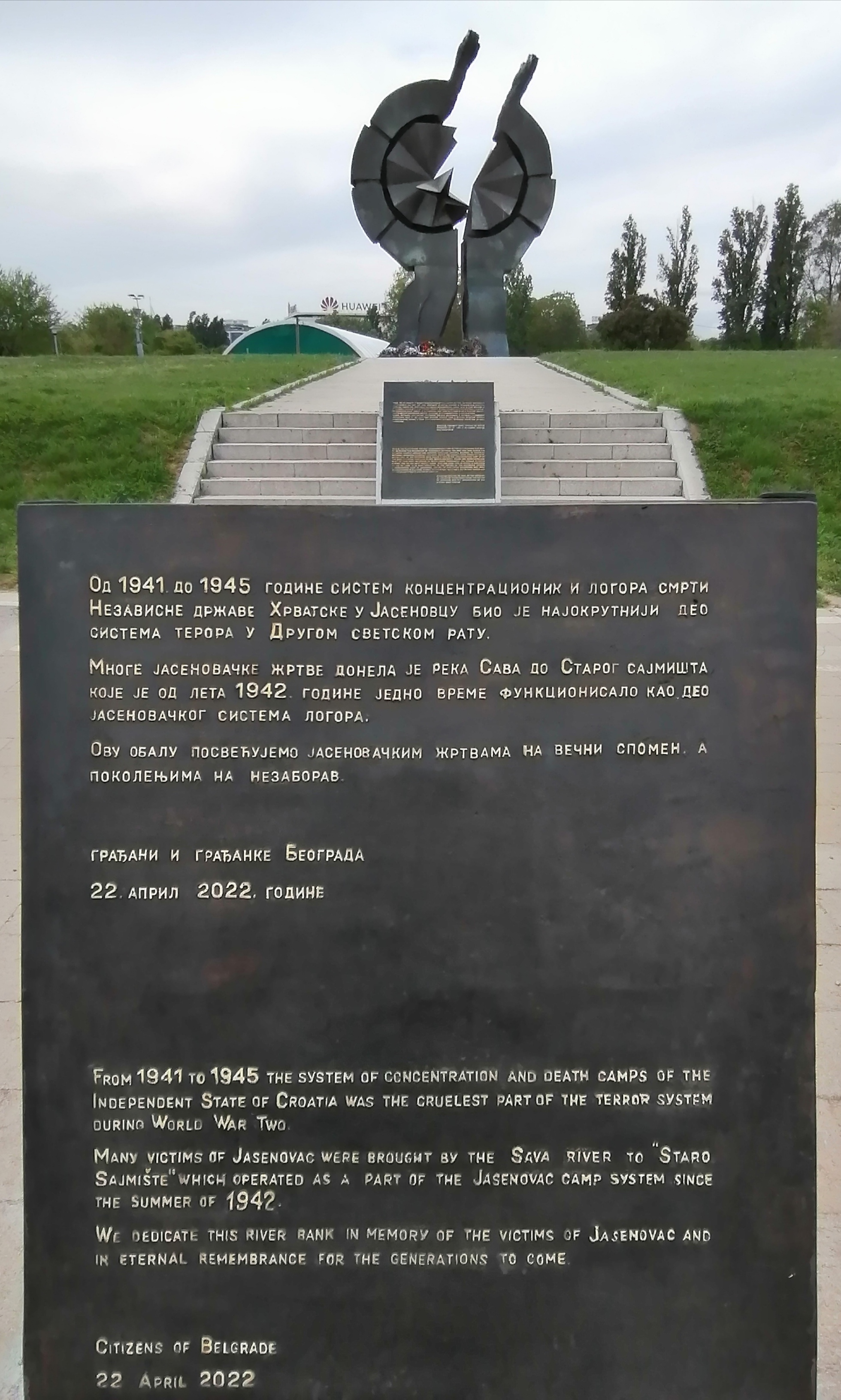
