= Šišatovac Monastery =

Monastery in Serbia

Coordinates: 45°07′32″N 19°33′28″E

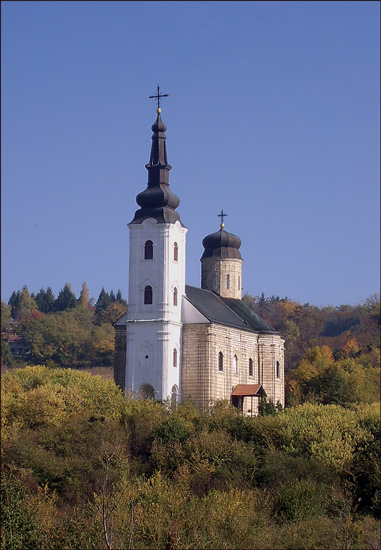
Monastery church

The Šišatovac Monastery (Serbian: Манастир Шишатовац, romanized: Manastir Šišatovac) is a Serb Orthodox monastery situated on the Fruška Gora mountain in the northern Serbia, in the province of Vojvodina. The foundation of the monastery is ascribed to the refugee monks from the Serbian monastery of Žiča. The first reliable facts illustrating the life of the monastery date back to the mid 16th century. A great benefactor of Šišatovac Monastery was Sekula Vitkovic (1687–1754) who in 1731 was appointed regimental commander of the Danube Serbian Militia. The building dates from the 16th century. It was through a donation by Vikentije Popović-Hadžilavić, the Bishop of Vršac, that the new, extant church building was constructed in 1778. The iconostasis is the work of the famed Baroque painter Grigorije Davidović-Obšić.

During World War II, the monastery and its church suffered heavy damages at the hands of Croatian Ustaše fascists in the Independent State of Croatia.

Šišatovac Monastery was declared Monument of Culture of Exceptional Importance in 1990, and it is protected by the state.

== See also ==
- List of Serbian Orthodox monasteries
