= List of Eastern Orthodox saints (N–S) =

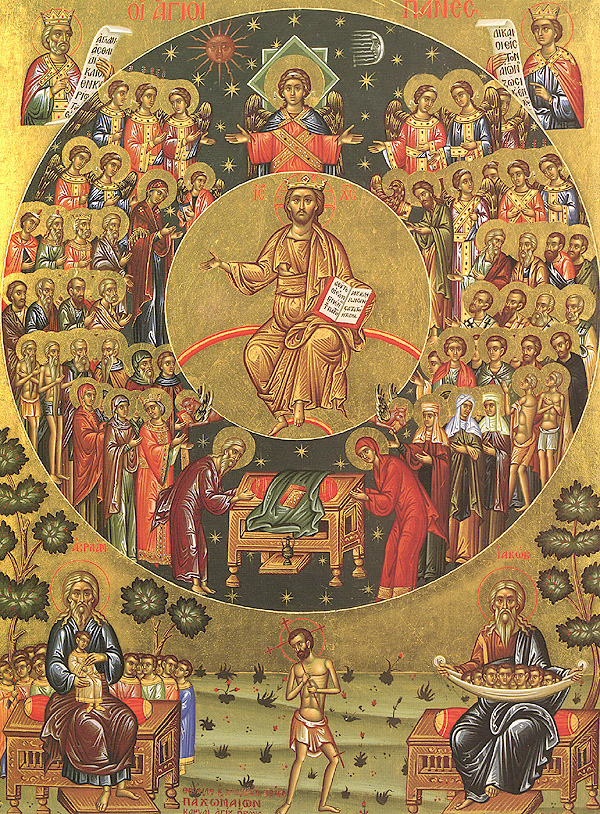
Icon depicting the Synaxis of All Saints; various saints can be identified by their saint attributes, such as Patriarch Abraham (bottom left, silver hair) or Patriarch Jacob (bottom right, seated)

This is an incomplete list of canonised saints in the Eastern Orthodox Church.

In Eastern Orthodoxy, a saint is defined as anyone, other than God, who is in heaven, whether recognised here on earth, or not. By this definition, Adam and Eve, Moses, the various prophets, and archangels are all given the title of Saint. Sainthood in the Orthodox Church does not necessarily reflect a moral model, but communion with God; there are many examples of people who lived in great sin and became saints by humility and repentance: Saints Mary of Egypt, Moses the Ethiopian, and Dismas, the repentant thief who was crucified with Jesus Christ. Therefore, a more complete Orthodox definition of what a saint is, has to do with the way that saints, through their humility and their love of mankind, saved inside them the entire Church, and loved all people.

Orthodox belief states that God reveals saints through answered prayers and other miracles. Saints are usually recognised by their local community, often by people who directly knew them. As their popularity grows they are often then recognised by the entire Church through the Holy Spirit. The word canonisation means that a Christian has been found worthy to have his name placed in the canon (official list) of saints of the Church. The formal process of recognition involves deliberation by a synod of bishops. Evidence of a virtuous life and prior local veneration of the saint are required for canonization.

Because the Church shows no true distinction between the living and the dead, as the saints are considered to be alive in heaven, saints are referred to as if they are still alive, and are venerated, not worshipped. They are believed to be able to intercede for the living for salvation or other requests and help mankind either through direct communion with God or by personal intervention.

== List ==
Some saints listed may also be a part of a larger group of saints also listed (particularly martyrs, such as Saint Laura of Córdoba and the Martyrs of Córdoba).

Image	Saint	Died (Year)	Feast Day (NS/OS)	Notes
	Nahum	700–612 BC	1 December	Prophet; who wrote the Book of Nahum; a.k.a. Naum
	Nahum of Preslav	910	23 December	Wonderworker, Equal-to-the-Apostles, Apostle of the Slavs
	Nana of Iberia	301–400	1 October	Equal-to-the-Apostles, Queen of Georgia
	Narcissus of Athens	33–150	31 October / 4 January	Apostle of the Seventy, Bishop of Athens, Venerable Hieromartyr
	Narcissus of Jerusalem	c. 216	7 August	Patriarch of Jerusalem, Venerable
	Narnus of Bergamo	345	27 August	First Bishop of Bergamo, Venerable
	Natalia of Nicomedia	306	26 August	Martyr, wife of St. Adrian of Nicomedia
	Natalis of Milan	751	13 May	Archbishop of Milan, Venerable
	Natalis of Ulster	564	27 January	Abbot of Cill, Naile and Daunhinis, Venerable
	Nathan	c. 1000 BC – c. 901 BC	Sunday of the Holy Forefathers	Prophet
	Nectarius of Aegina	1920	9 November	Titular Metropolitan of Pentapolis, Venerable Wonderworker; name also spelled Nectarios or Nectarius
	Nectarius of Constantinople	397	11 October	Church Father, Archbishop of Constantinople, Venerable
	Nehemiah	444–344 BC	Sunday of the Holy Forefathers	Prophet; who wrote the Book of Nehemiah; a.k.a. Nehemias
	Nemesion	c. 257	10 September	Bishop of Numidia, Venerable Hieromartyr; a.k.a. Nemesian, Nemesius and Nemesis
	Neot of Cornwall	877	31 July	Venerable, Hermit
	Nephon II of Constantinople	1508	11 August	Ecumenical Patriarch of Constantinople, Venerable
	Nestor of Dečani	1501–1600	24 November [O.S. 11 November]	Venerable
	Nestor the Chronicler	c. 1114	27 October	Venerable, the Chronicler
	Nestor the Sinaite	1301–1400	30 August [O.S. 17 August]	Venerable, one of the Sinaites in Serbia, brother of St. Roman the Sinaite
	Roman the Sinaite	1301–1400		Venerable, one of the Sinaites in Serbia, brother of St. Nestor the Sinaite
	New Martyrs of Dabro-Bosnia and Mileševa	1941–1946	11 July [O.S. 28 June]	New Martyrs; who consisted of many clergymen and monastics and were martyred by the Ustaše (1941) and later by the Yugoslav Partisans (1945–1946)
	Nicanor the Deacon	33–36	28 December / 28 July / 4 January	Apostle of the Seventy, one of the seven Deacons, Hieromartyr
	Nicanor of Hilandar	1990	4 March [O.S. 19 February]	Hegumen of Hilandar Monastery, Venerable; a.k.a. Nicanor the New; surnamed Savić
	Nicetas of Constantinople	836	13 October	Venerable Confessor, iconodule; a.k.a. Nicetas the Patrician, Nicetas of Paphlagonia and Nicetas Monomachos
	Nicetas of Medikion	824	3 April	Hegumen of Medikion, Venerable Wonderworker, Confessor, iconodule
	Nicetas of Novgorod	1109	31 January / 14 May	Archbishop of Novgorod, Venerable Wonderworker
	Nicetas of Remesiana	414–420	22 June	Church Father, Bishop of Remesiana, Venerable
	Nicetas the Goth	372	15 September	Greatmartyr, a.k.a. Nikitas the Goth
	Nicetas the Stylite	1186	24 May	Venerable Martyr, Wonderworker of Pereyaslavl-Zalessky, the Stylite; a.k.a. Nicetas Stylites
	Nicholas of Japan	1912	3 February	Equal-to-the-Apostles, Enlightener and Archbishop of Japan, Venerable
	Nicholas Kabasilas	1392	20 June	Righteous, Priest; a.k.a. Nicholas Cabasilas
	Nicholas of Myra	343	6 December	Archbishop of Myra, Defender of Orthodoxy, Venerable Wonderworker; the historical inspiration for Santa Claus; a.k.a. Nicholas of Bari
	Nicholas of Ohrid and Žiča	1956	31 March [O.S. 18 March] 3 May [O.S. 20 April]	Bishop of Ohrid and Žiča, Venerable, the New Chrysostom; who wrote the Prologue of Ohrid; surnamed Velimirović
	Nicholas II of Russia	1918	17 July	Emperor of All Russia, Passion bearer; head of the Romanov Martyrs
	Nicholas Salos of Pskov	1576	28 February	Blessed, Fool for Christ
	Nicholas of Trani	1091	2 June	Fool for Christ, widely known as Nicholas the Pilgrim
	Nicodemus	33–100	2 August / Sunday of the Holy Myrrhbearers	Righteous, Myrrhbearer
	Nicodemus I of Peć	1325	24 May [O.S. 11 May]	10th Archbishop of Serbia (r. 1316–1324), Venerable, who co-founded Vratna Monastery with St. Milutin; a.k.a. Nicodemus of Hilandar
	Nicodemus of Tismana	1406	8 January [O.S. 21 December]	Venerable; Hesychast; who founded three monasteries, one in Serbia and two in Romania; a.k.a. Nicodemus the Sanctified, surnamed Grčić
	Nicodemus the Hagiorite	1809	14 July	Venerable, Athonite monk; a.k.a. Nikodemos and Nicodemus of the Holy Mountain
	Nikephoros I of Constantinople	828	2 June	Ecumenical Patriarch of Constantinople, Venerable Hieroconfessor, iconodule
	Nikephoros the Leper	1964	4 January	Schemamonk, a.k.a. Nicephorus, Nicholas Tzanakakis
	Nikon the Dry	1101	11 December / 28 September / Second Sunday of Great Lent	Venerable, the Dry
	Nikon the Metanoeite	998	26 November	Venerable, the Metanoeite (the Preacher of Repentance)
	Nikon of Optina	1931	25 June	Venerable
	Nikon I	1435	12 September [O.S. 30 August]	9th Patriarch of Serbia (r. 1420–1435), Venerable
	Nilus the Younger	1002 / 1005	26 September	Abbot, Venerable Confessor; a.k.a. Nilus of Calabria
	Nilus of Sinai	430 / 451	12 November	Church Father, Desert Father, Venerable; a.k.a. Nilus the Elder, Neilos, Nilus of Sinai, Nilus of Ancyra and Nil Postnik
	Nilus of Sora	1508	7 May	Hegumen, Venerable
	Nino of Georgia	c. 332	14 January	Equal-to-the-Apostles, Enlightener of the Georgians; a.k.a. Nina, Nune, and Ninny
	Niphont of Novgorod	1156	8 April	Archbishop of Novgorod, Venerable
	Noah	c. 1998 BC	Sunday of the Holy Forefathers	Patriarch, Righteous
	Non	501–600	3 March	Mother of St. David
	Nonna of Nazianzus	c.	5 August	Mother of St. Gregory Nazianzus
	Nonnus of Heliopolis	471	10 November	Desert Father, Bishop of Heliopolis, Venerable
	Nothhelm of Canterbury	739	17 October	Archbishop of Canterbury, Venerable
	Obadiah	900–801 BC	19 November	Prophet; who wrote the Book of Obadiah; a.k.a. Abdias
	Odile of Alsace	720	13 December	Abbess of Hohenburg, Venerable; a.k.a. Odilia and Ottilia
	Odo of Cluny	942	11 May	Abbot of Cluny, Venerable
	Olaf II of Norway	1030	29 July	King of Norway, Martyr
	Olga of Alaska	1979	28 October	Righteous, the first canonised female American Orthodox saint; a.k.a. Olga Michael, Matushka Olga and Olga of Kwethluk
	Olga of Kiev	969	11 July	Equal-to-the-Apostles, Blessed, Princess of Kiev
	Olga Nikolaevna	1918	17 July	Passion bearer; one of the Romanov Martyrs
	Olympas	c. 64 – c. 68	10 November / 4 January	Apostle of the Seventy, Martyr, martyred with St. Herodion; a.k.a. Olympanus
	Olympias the Deaconess	409	25 July	Deaconess; a.k.a. Olympiada
	Onesimus of Byzantium	109	15 February / 4 January	Apostle of the Seventy, Bishop of Ephesus, Hieromartyr, former slave of St. Philemon
	Onesiphorus	33–100	7 September / 8 December / 4 January	Apostle of the Seventy, Bishop of Colophon and Corinth, Hieromartyr
	Onuphrius the Great	400	12 June	Desert Father, Venerable, the Great
	Optatus of Milevis	c. 387	4 June	Church Father, Bishop of Milevis, Venerable; who opposed Donatism; a.k.a. Optate
	Or of Nitria	c. 390	7 August	Desert Father, Venerable
	Orsisius	301–400	15 June	Desert Father, Venerable, disciple of St. Pachomius; a.k.a. Arsisios
	Oswald of Northumbria	642	5 August	King of Northumbria, Martyr
	Osyth	653	7 October	Abbess, Venerable, name also spelled Osith
	Ouen	684	24 August	Bishop of Rouen, Venerable; a.k.a. Audoin, Aldwin, Owen and Dado
	Pabo Post Prydain	c. 510	9 November	King of the Pennines, Pillar of Britain, Venerable; who founded St Pabo's Church, Llanbabo
	Pachomius the Great	c. 348	15 May	Church Father, Desert Father, Venerable, the Great; who founded coenobitic monasticism
	Pacian of Barcelona	c. 390	9 March	Church Father, Bishop of Barcelona, Venerable
	Paisius the Great	401–500	19 June	Desert Father, Venerable, name also spelled Paisios and Pishoy/Bishoy
	Paisius the Hegumen	1814	30 December [O.S. 17 December]	Hegumen of Mošatanica Monastery, New Venerable Martyr, who was martyred with St. Habakkuk; surnamed Ristović
	Paisius of Hilendar	c. 1773	19 June	Venerable Hieromonk, native name Paìsiy Hilendàrski
	Paisius of Janjevo	1647	15 October [O.S. 2 October]	21st Patriarch of Serbia (r. 1614–1647), Venerable
	Paisius of Mount Athos	1994	12 July	Venerable, Athonite ascetic, name also spelled Paisios
	Paisius of Sihăstria	1990	2 December	Native name Paisie Olaru
	Paisius Velichkovsky	1794	15 November	Venerable
	Palladius of Antioch	390	28 January	Venerable; a.k.a. Palladius the Desert Dweller and Palladius the Hermit
	Palladius of Auxerre	661	10 April	Bishop of Auxerre, Abbot of the Abbey of Saint-Germain d'Auxerre, Venerable
	Palladius of Embrun	541	21 June	Bishop of Embrun, Venerable
	Palladius of Ireland	457–461	7 July	Bishop of Ireland, Venerable
	Palladius of Saintes	c. 590	7 October	Bishop of Saintes, Venerable
	Pambo of Nitria	c. 375 – c. 390	18 July	Desert Father, Venerable, disciple of St. Anthony; a.k.a. Pambo the Hermit
	Pamphilus of Caesarea	309	16 February	Church Father, Presbyter, Hieromartyr
	Pantaleon of Nicomedia	304	27 July	Unmercenary Healer, Great Martyr; a.k.a. Panteleimon
	Paphnutius the Ascetic	395–450	25 February	Desert Father, Venerable, the Ascetic, disciple of St. Macarius
	Paphnutius of Jerusalem	303–313	19 April	Bishop, Venerable Hieromartyr
	Paphnutius of Thebes	335–400	11 September	Desert Father, Bishop of Tais, Venerable
	Papias of Hierapolis	c. 130	22 February	Church Father, Bishop of Hierapolis, Venerable
	Paraskeva of the Balkans	1001–1100	27 October	Venerable, Ascetic, the Younger; a.k.a. Parascheva and Petka
	Paraskevi of Rome	c. 180	26 July	Virgin Martyr; a.k.a. Parasceva
	Parmenas the Deacon	98 / 117	28 July / 4 January	Apostle of the Seventy, one of the seven Deacons, Hieromartyr
	Parthenius the Martyr	201–300	19 May	Martyr
	Parthenius III of Constantinople	1657	24 March	Ecumenical Patriarch of Constantinople, New Venerable Hieromartyr
	Patapios of Thebes	301–500	8 December	Venerable Wonderworker, name also spelled Patapius
	Patrick of Ireland	461 / 492	17 March	Apostle of Ireland, Enlightener of the Irish, Church Father, Bishop of Armagh, Venerable
	Patrobas of Pottole	33–100	5 November / 4 January	Apostle of the Seventy, Bishop of Neapolis (now Naples) and Puteoli; a.k.a. Patrobos, Patrobus or Parrobus
	Paul the Apostle	c. 68	25 January / 10 February / 29 June	Apostle to the Gentiles, Martyr; who wrote the Pauline epistles; previously named Saul
	Paul Aurelian	c. 575	12 March	Bishop of León, Venerable
	Paul I of Constantinople	c. 350	6 November	Archbishop of Constantinople, Venerable Hieromartyr or Hieroconfessor; a.k.a. Paul the Confessor
	Paul IV of Constantinople	804	30 August	Ecumenical Patriarch of Constantinople, Venerable; a.k.a. Paul the Younger and Paul the New
	Paul the Simple	c. 339	7 March / 4 October	Desert Father, Venerable
	Paul of Taganrog	1879	10 March / 7 June	Blessed lay starets, Righteous
	Paul of Thebes	341	15 January	Desert Father, Venerable; a.k.a. Paul the Anchorite, Paul the Hermit, and Paul the First Hermit
	Paulinus of Antioch	c. 67	12 July	Bishop of Lucca, Venerable Hieromartyr
	Paulinus II of Aquileia	802 / 804	11 January	Bishop of Aquileia, Venerable
	Paulinus of Nola	431	22 June	Church Father, Bishop of Nola, Venerable, Hermit
	Paulinus of Trier	358	31 August	Bishop of Trier, Venerable; who died in exile due to his opposition to Arianism
	Paulinus of York	584	10 October	Bishop of York, Venerable
	Pavin of Le Mans	c. 703	15 November	Abbot of St Mary's Monastery, Venerable; a.k.a. Paduinus
	Pelagia of Diveyevo	1884	30 January	Fool for Christ, Blessed
	Pelagia the Martyr	301–305	4 May / 7 October	Virgin Martyr; a.k.a. Pelagia of Tarsus
	Pelagia the Penitent	301–500	8 October	Venerable, Ascetic; a.k.a. Pelagia of Antioch and Pelagia the Harlot
	Pelagia of Tinos	1834	23 July	Venerable; a nun who experienced a Marian apparition guiding her to find the icon of Our Lady of Tinos
	Pelagia the Virgin	303–305	8 October	Virgin Martyr; a.k.a. Pelagia of Antioch
	Pelagius of Constance	c. 283	28 August	Deacon, Hieromartyr
	Pelagius of Córdoba	925	26 June	Martyr; a.k.a. Pelayo
	Pelagius, Arsenius and Sylvanus	c. 950	30 August	Venerable Martyrs, Hermits
	Peter the Aleut	c. 1815	24 September	Martyr of San Francisco, the Aleut, native name Cungagnaq
	Peter I of Alexandria	311	25 November	Church Father, Patriarch of Alexandria, Venerable Hieromartyr
	Peter the Apostle	c. 64 – c. 68	29 June / 30 June	Leader of the Apostles, Apostle, first Patriarch of Rome and Patriarch of Antioch, Hieromartyr, the All-Praised; who wrote 1 Peter and 2 Peter; a.k.a. Simon Peter and Simeon
	Peter of Atroa	837	3 January	Hegumen, Venerable
	Peter of Braga	45–60	26 April	Bishop of Braga, Venerable Hieromartyr; a.k.a. Peter of Rates
	Peter of Canterbury	c. 607	6 January	Missionary, Abbot of St Augustine's Abbey, Venerable
	Peter of Cetinje	1830	31 October [O.S. 18 October]	Prince-Bishop of Montenegro, Venerable, Wonderworker, Myroblyte; regnal name Petar I Petrović-Njegoš
	Peter Chrysologus	c. 450	30 July	Church Father, Bishop of Ravenna, Venerable Hieroconfessor, the Golden-Worded
	Peter of Dabar-Bosnia	1941	17 September [O.S. 4 September]	Metropolitan of Dabar-Bosnia, New Hieromartyr; surnamed Zimonjić
	Peter of Koriša	1275–1300	18 June [O.S. 5 June]	Wonderworker, Venerable; the first Serbian hermit, who practiced asceticism in the Hermitage of St. Peter of Koriša
	Peter of Krutitsy	1937	10 October	Metropolitan of Krutitsy, New Venerable Hieromartyr
	Peter Mogila	1647	1 January	Metropolitan of Kiev, Venerable
	Peter of Moscow	1326	21 December	Metropolitan of Moscow, Wonderworker of All Russia, Venerable
	Peter of Murom	1228	25 June	Prince of Murom, Right-Believing, Wonderworker, husband of St. Fevronia of Murom
	Peter of Pavia	c. 735	7 May	Bishop of Pavia, Venerable
	Peter of Sebaste	391	9 January	Bishop of Sebaste, Venerable Hieromartyr, brother of St. Basil the Great
	Peter Urseolus	987	10 January	Venerable, Hermit, Doge of Venice
	Petroc	c. 594	4 June	Abbot of Lanwethinoc, Venerable, name also spelled Petrock, Pedrog and Perreux
	Petroniu Tănase	2011	24 February	Monk
	Phanourios the Newly-Revealed	1306–1500	27 August	Great Martyr, Newly-Revealed
	Philemon	54–68	19 February / 22 November / 4 January	Apostle of the Seventy, Bishop of Gaza, Hieromartyr, former slavemaster of St. Onesimus
	Philetus and companions	c. 121	23 March / 27 March	Martyrs; whose names were Lydia, Macedo, Theoprepides, Amphilochius and Cronidas
	Philibert of Jumièges	684	20 August	Abbot of Jumièges Abbey and Rebais, Venerable; who founded Noirmoutier Abbey and restored other monasteries
	Philip of Agira	c. 401 – c. 500	12 May	Apostle of the Sicilians, Hieromartyr
	Philip of Fermo	c. 270	22 October	Bishop of Fermo, Venerable Hieromartyr
	Philip of Gortyna	180	11 April / 8 October (Church of Crete)	Bishop of Gortyna, Venerable, Apologist; who wrote a now-lost treatise against Gnosticism
	Philip of Heraclea	c. 304	22 October	Bishop of Heraclea, Venerable Hieromartyr
	Philip II of Moscow	1569	9 January / 3 July	Metropolitan of Moscow and all Rus', Venerable Hieromartyr
	Philip of Vienne	c. 578	3 February	Bishop of Vienne, Venerable
	Philip of Zell	c. 770	3 May	Venerable hermit; who founded a monastery in the German town of Zell with his disciples
	Philip the Apostle	80	14 November / 30 June	Apostle, Martyr
	Philip the Evangelist	50–100	11 October / 4 January	Apostle of the Seventy, Evangelist, Bishop of Tralles, one of the seven Deacons
	Philologus of Sinope	33–100	5 November / 4 January	Apostle of the Seventy, Bishop of Sinope
	Philothei of Athens	1589	19 February	New Venerable Martyr; a.k.a. Philotheia or Philothea
	Philotheus I of Constantinople	1379	11 October	Ecumenical Patriarch of Constantinople, Venerable
	Philoumenos of Jacob's Well	1979	29 November	Hegumen and Guardian of Jacob's Well, New Venerable Hieromartyr
	Phinehas	c. 1500 BC	12 March	Righteous, High Priest of Israel, grandson of Prophet Aaron, name also spelled Phineas
	Phlegon of Marathon	33–100	8 April / 4 January	Apostle of the Seventy, Bishop of Marathon, Hieromartyr
	Phoebe the Deaconess	50–100	3 September	Deaconess
	Photini of Samaria	c. 66	20 March	The Samaritan woman at the well, Martyr
	Photius the Great	893	6 February	Church Father, Equal-to-the-Apostles, Ecumenical Patriarch of Constantinople, Pillar of Orthodoxy, Venerable Hieroconfessor, the Great; a.k.a. Photios I of Constantinople
	Pimen the Faster	1141	7 August / 28 August	Hegumen of the Kiev Caves, Venerable, the Faster; a.k.a. Pimen of the Kiev Caves
	Pior of Scetis	350–400	17 June	Desert Father, Venerable, disciple of St. Anthony, name also spelled Prior
	Pior Zatvirnyk	1201–1300	4 October	Venerable
	Piran	c. 480	5 March	Abbot, Venerable, name also spelled Pyran
	Pitirim of Porphyry	350–500	29 November	Desert Father, Venerable
	Pius I	154	11 July	Patriarch of Rome, Venerable Hieromartyr
	Platon of Banja Luka	1941	5 May [O.S. 22 April]	Bishop of Banja Luka, New Venerable Hieromartyr; surnamed Jovanović
	Platon Kulbusch	1919	14 January	Bishop of Reval (Tallinn), New Venerable Hieromartyr
	Plegmund of Canterbury	914	2 August	Archbishop of Canterbury, Venerable
	Poemen the Great	c. 450	27 August	Church Father, Desert Father, Venerable, the Great, name also spelled Pimen
	Polycarp of Smyrna	155	23 February	Church Father, Bishop of Smyrna, Venerable Hieromartyr
	Polyeuctus of Constantinople	970	5 February	Ecumenical Patriarch of Constantinople, Venerable
	Polyeuctus of Melitene	259	9 January	Protomartyr of Melitene
	Porphyrios of Kafsokalyvia	1991	2 December	Venerable Wonderworker, Hieromonk, name also spelled Porphyrius
	Porphyrius of Gaza	420	26 February	Bishop of Gaza, Venerable
	Praejectus	676	25 January	Bishop of Clermont, Venerable
	Praxedes	c. 165	21 July	Virgin, sister of St. Pudentiana
	Priscilla	33–100	14 July / 13 February	Martyr, wife of St. Aquila
	Prochorus the Deacon	c. 80 – c. 100	28 July / 4 January	Apostle of the Seventy, one of the seven Deacons, Hieromartyr, disciple of St. John the Apostle whilst he was exiled on the island of Patmos
	Proclus of Constantinople	446	20 November	Church Father, Archbishop of Constantinople, Venerable
	Procopius of Sázava	1053	16 September	Abbot of Sázava Monastery, Venerable; a.k.a. Procopius the Czech
	Procopius of Scythopolis	303	8 July / 22 November	Great Martyr, Military Saint
	Procopius of Ustyug	1303	8 July	Fool for Christ, Venerable
	Prosper of Aquitaine	436	7 July	Church Father, Bishop of Aquitaine, Venerable
	Prosper of Orléans	c. 453	29 July	Bishop of Orléans, Venerable
	Prosper of Reggio	c. 466	25 June	Bishop of Reggio, Venerable
	Publius of Malta	112 / 125	13 March	First Bishop of Malta and early Bishop of Athens, Venerable Hieromartyr; whose dysentery-stricken father was healed by St. Paul after his shipwreck on Malta in Acts 28
	Pudens	54–68	15 April / 4 January	Apostle of the Seventy, Martyr
	Pudentiana	101–200	19 May	Virgin Martyr, sister of St. Praxedes; a.k.a. Potentiana
	Quadratus of Athens	129	21 September / 4 January	Apostle of the Seventy, Church Father, Bishop of Athens, Hieromartyr, apologist; a.k.a. Codratus
	Quadratus of Africa	33–313	26 May	Martyr; a.k.a. Codratus
	Quadratus of Corinth	249–251	10 March	Martyr; a.k.a. Codratus
	Quadratus of Herbipolis	c. 257	7 May	Martyr; a.k.a. Codratus
	Quadratus of Nicomedia	253–260	10 March	Martyr; a.k.a. Codratus
	Quadratus of Utica	259	21 August	Bishop of Utica, Venerable Hieromartyr; a.k.a. Codratus
	Quartus of Berytus	33–150	10 November / 4 January	Apostle of the Seventy, Bishop of Berytus, Hieroconfessor
	Quodvultdeus	450	19 February	Church Father, Bishop of Carthage, Venerable
	Rabulas of Samosata	530	19 February	Venerable, name also written as Rabula and Rabbula
	Razhden the Protomartyr	457	August 16	Martyr
	Rachel	Patriarchal Age	Sunday of the Holy Forefathers	Righteous, wife of Patriarch Jacob, mother of Patriarchs Benjamin and Joseph
	Raphael the Archangel	N/A (Note: According to Christian theology, angels do not die.)	8 November	Archangel
	Raphael of Banat	1601–1700	29 August [O.S. 16 August]	Venerable
	Raphael of Šišatovac	1941	3 September [O.S. 21 August]	Prior of Šišatovac Monastery, New Venerable Hieromartyr; surnamed Momčilović
	Raphael, Nicholas, and Irene of Lesbos	1463	9 April / Bright Tuesday	New Martyrs
	Raphael of Brooklyn	1915	27 February	Bishop of Brooklyn, Venerable
	Rastislav of Moravia	870	11 May	Equal-to-the-Apostles, Passion bearer, Confessor, Duke of Moravia; who ordered Saints Cyril and Methodius to translate various liturgical books into Slavonic; a.k.a. Rostislav
	Rebecca	Patriarchal Age	Sunday of the Holy Forefathers	Righteous, wife of Patriarch Isaac, mother of Patriarch Jacob and Esau
	Reginos of Skopelos	362	25 February	Bishop of Skopelos, Venerable Hieromartyr, name also spelt Riginos
	Remigius of Reims	533	1 October	Apostle to the Franks, Bishop of Reims, Venerable Hieroconfessor; a.k.a. Remy and Remi
	Romanus the Melodist	556	1 October	Church Father, Melodist, hymnographer, composer of thousands of hymns, name also spelled Romanos
	Romuald	1027	7 February	Abbot, Venerable, founder of the Camaldolese order
	Rostislav I of Kiev	1167	14 March	Right-Believing, Grand Prince of Kiev
	Rufus of Thebes	50–100	8 April / 4 January	Apostle of the Seventy, Bishop of Thebes, Hieromartyr
	Ruth	1100–1001 BC	Sunday of the Holy Forefathers	Righteous
	Sabbas the Sanctified	532	5 December	Hegumen, Venerable, name also spelled Savvas, Savva and Sava
	Sabbas of Storozhi	1406	3 December / 19 January / 10 August	Hegumen of Zvenigorod, Venerable, disciple of St. Sergius
	Sabbatius of Solovki	1435	27 September / 8 August	Venerable Wonderworker; who founded the Solovki monastery with St. Zosimas
	Sabiana of Samtskhe	1001–1100	31 December	Venerable
	Saethryth	601–700	7 January	Abbess, Venerable
	Salome	33–100	3 August / Sunday of the Holy Myrrhbearers	Myrrhbearer
	Sampson the Hospitable	c. 530	27 June	Unmercenary Healer, Blessed, the Innkeeper
	Samson	c. 1078 BC	Sunday of the Holy Forefathers	Judge, Righteous, the Strong Man, name also spelled Sampson
	Samuel	1012 BC	20 August	Prophet, Judge
	Sarah	Patriarchal Age	Sunday of the Holy Forefathers	Righteous, wife of Patriarch Abraham, previously known as Sarai
	Sava I of Serbia	1237	27 January [O.S. 14 January](Saint Sava Day)	Equal-to-the-Apostles, Enlightener of the Serbs, first Archbishop of Serbia (r. 1219–1233), Venerable Hieroconfessor, son of Simeon the Myrrh-Streaming, patron saint of Serbia, Serbs and Serbian education and medicine; birth name Rastko Nemanjić
	Sava II of Serbia	1271	21 February [O.S. 8 February]	3rd Archbishop of Serbia (r. 1263–1271), Venerable, nephew of St. Sava I; birth name Predislav Nemanjić
	Sava II Branković	1683	7 June [O.S. 24 May]	Metropolitan of Transylvania, Venerable Hieroconfessor; a.k.a. Sabbas Brancovici in Romanian
	Sava III of Serbia	1316	8 August [O.S. 26 July] 12 September [O.S. 30 August]	9th Archbishop of Serbia (r. 1309–1316), Venerable
	Sava of Gornji Karlovac	1941	17 July [O.S. 4 July]	Bishop of Gornji Karlovac, New Venerable Hieromartyr; surnamed Trlajić
	Scholastica of Norcia	543	10 February	Venerable, sister of St. Benedict; foundress of the Benedictine nuns
	Sebastian of Esztergom	c. 1036	30 December	Archbishop of Esztergom, Venerable, Benedictine monk, native name Sebestyén
	Sebastian of Jackson	1940	30 November [O.S. 17 November]	Archimandrite, Venerable, Missionary; native name Sevastijan Dabović
	Sebastian of Rome	295–296	18 December	Martyr
	Selaphiel the Archangel	N/A (Note: According to Christian theology, angels do not die.)	8 November	Archangel
	Seraphim the Enduring of Sâmbăta de Sus	1990	20 December	Hieromonk
	Seraphim of Bogucharsk	1950	13 February	Archbishop of Bogucharsk, Venerable Wonderworker of Sofia
	Seraphim of Sarov	1833	2 January	Venerable Confessor and Wonderworker
	Seraphim of the Trinity	1941	11 July [O.S. 28 June]	Hegumen of the Monastery of the Holy Trinity of Pljevlja, New Venerable Hieromartyr, one of the New Martyrs of Dabro-Bosnia and Mileševa; surnamed Džarić
	Serapion of Antioch	211	18 October	Patriarch of Antioch, Venerable; name also spelled Seraphion
	Serapion of Novgorod	1516	16 March	Archbishop of Novgorod, Venerable Wonderworker
	Serapion the Sindonite	356	7 April	Desert Father, Venerable; a.k.a. Serapion of Egypt
	Serapion of Thmuis	c. 360	21 March	Desert Father, Bishop of Thmuis, Venerable; a.k.a. Serapion of Nitria and Serapion the Scholastic
	Serapion of Vladimir	1275	12 July	Bishop of Vladimir, Venerable, Blessed
	Sergius I of Rome	701	8 September	Patriarch of Rome, Venerable
	Sergius of Radonezh	1392	25 September	Hegumen of Radonezh, Venerable Wonderworker of all Russia
	Sergius of Valaam	901–1500	28 June	Venerable Wonderworker, co-founder of Valaam Monastery with St. Herman of Valaam
	Seridus of Gaza	c. 543	13 August	Hegumen, Venerable, confidant of St. Barsanuphius of Gaza
	Seth	1142 AM	Sunday of the Holy Forefathers	Righteous, son of Forefather Adam
	Shemaiah	c. 1000 BC – c. 901 BC	8 January / Sunday of the Holy Forefathers	Prophet
	Shushanik	475	17 October	Martyr
	Silas	65–100	30 July / 4 January	Apostle of the Seventy, Bishop of Corinth, Hieromartyr
	Silvanus of Thessalonica	33–100	30 July / 4 January	Apostle of the Seventy, Bishop of Thessalonica, Hieromartyr
	Silverius of Rome	537	20 June	Patriarch of Rome, Venerable
	Simeon Barsabae	345	17 April	Bishop of Seleucia-Ctesiphon, Venerable Hieromartyr
	Simeon of Jerusalem	c. 107 / 117	27 April / 4 January	Brother of the Lord, Apostle of the Seventy, Patriarch of Jerusalem, Hieromartyr; a.k.a. Simon of Clopas
	Simeon Niger	33–150	27 April / 4 January	Apostle of the Seventy, Prophet; a.k.a. Simeon of Antioch
	Simeon of Trier	1035	1 May	Venerable, Hermit
	Simeon the God-receiver	1–100	3 February	God-receiver, Righteous
	Simeon the Holy Fool	501–600	21 July	Fool for Christ, Venerable; a.k.a. Simeon Salos/Salus
	Simeon of Dajbabe	1941	1 April [O.S. 19 March]	Hegumen of Dajbabe Monastery, Venerable, Hieromonk; surnamed Popović
	Simeon the Myrrh-Streaming	1200	26 February [O.S. 13 February]	Right-Believing, Venerable, Myroblyte, Grand Prince of Serbia, father of St. Sava I; and Simeon the Monk; birth name Stefan Nemanja
	Simeon the Monk	1228	7 October [O.S. 24 September]	Right-Believing, Venerable, Grand Prince of Serbia, son of St. Simeon the Myroblyte; regnal name Stefan the First-Crowned and birth name Stefan Nemanjić
	Simeon Stylites the Elder	459	1 September	Venerable, Stylite, the Elder
	Simeon Stylites the Younger	596	24 May	Venerable, Stylite, Hieromonk, the Younger
	Simeon Stylites III	401–451	3 July	Archimandrite, Venerable, Stylite, hermit, possibly a.k.a. Simeon of Aegea or Simeon of Cilicia
	Simeon Stylites of Lesbos	844	1 February	Venerable, Stylite, iconodule
	Simon of Cyrene	c. 100	27 February	The man who helped carry Jesus' cross in Matthew 27:32
	Simon the Athonite	1287	28 December	Venerable, Myroblyte
	Simon the Zealot	c. 65	10 May / 30 June	Apostle, Martyr
	Simplicius of Rome	483	10 March	Patriarch of Rome, Venerable; who fought against Monophysitism
	Siricius of Rome	399	26 November	Patriarch of Rome, Venerable
	Sisoes the Great	429	6 July	Desert Father, Venerable, the Great
	Sixtus I	c. 125	3 April	Patriarch of Rome, Venerable Hieromartyr, name also spelled Xystus
	Sixtus II	258	10 August	Patriarch of Rome, Venerable Hieromartyr, name also spelled Xystus
	Sixtus III	440	28 March	Patriarch of Rome, Venerable, name also spelled Xystus
	Slobodan of Donjo Kamenica	1992	27 July [O.S. 14 July]	New Child Martyr, who was martyred by a Kosovar Albanian woman named Elfeta Veseli after searching for his dog during the Bosnian War; surnamed Stojanović
	Sofian Boghiu	2002	16 September	Hegumen of St. Anthimos Monastery, Archimandrite, Hesychast, Venerable Confessor
	Solomon	c. 932 BC	Sunday of the Holy Forefathers	Prophet, King of Israel, the Wise; who wrote the Books of Proverbs, Ecclesiastes and Song of Songs and wrote Psalms 71 (72) and 127 (128)
	Solomonia	167–160 BC	1 August	Martyr, mother of the 7 Maccabean Martyrs
	Sophia of Milan	101–200	17 September	Virgin Martyr, mother of Saints Faith, Hope and Charity; a.k.a. Sophia of Rome
	Sophia of Słuck	1612	19 March	Righteous, Princess of Slutsk, native name Zofia Radziwiłł
	Sophia of Suzdal	1542	16 December	Venerable, Grand Princess of Moscow; native name Solomonia Saburova
	Sophronius of Jerusalem	638	11 March	Patriarch of Jerusalem, Venerable
	Sophrony of Essex	1993	11 July	Venerable, Athonite Archimandrite; a.k.a. Sophrony the Athonite and Sophrony Sakharov
	Sosipater of Iconium	33–150	28 April / 29 April / 10 November / 4 January	Apostle of the Seventy, Bishop of Iconium
	Sosthenes	33–150	8 December / 4 January	Apostle of the Seventy, Bishop of Caesarea
	Soter	174	22 April	Patriarch of Rome, Venerable Hieromartyr
	Soteris	304	10 February	Virgin Martyr
	Spyridon of Tremithus	348	12 December / Cheesefare Saturday	Desert Father, Bishop of Tremithus, Venerable Wonderworker
	Spyridon of Serbia	1389	28 June [O.S. 15 June]	4th Patriarch of Serbia (r. 1380–1389), Venerable
	Stachys the Apostle	c. 54	31 October / 4 January	Apostle of the Seventy, Bishop of Byzantium
	Stephanas	33–100	15 June / 4 January	Apostle of the Seventy
	Stephen the Blind	1476	22 October [O.S. 9 October] 23 December [O.S. 10 December]	Right-Believing, Despot of Serbia; birth name Stefan Branković
	Stephen of Dečani	1331	24 November [O.S. 11 November]	Martyr, King of Serbia, Ktetor, who founded the Monastery of Visoki Dečani; regnal name Stefan Uroš III
	Stephen the Protomartyr	33–36	27 December / 2 August / 15 September / 4 January	Apostle of the Seventy, Archdeacon, Protomartyr, Hieromartyr, one of the seven Deacons
	Stephen I of Rome	257	2 August	Patriarch of Rome, Venerable Hieromartyr
	Stephen of Hungary	1038	16 August	King of Hungary, Confessor
	Stephen of Perm	1396	26 April	Apostle of the Permians, Enlightener, Bishop of Perm, Venerable
	Stephen of Piperi	1697	2 June [O.S. 20 May]	Hegumen of Morača Monastery, Venerable
	Stephen the Great	1504	2 July	Right-Believing, Prince of Moldavia; regnal name Stephen III
	Stephen the Tall	1427	1 August [O.S. 19 July]	Right-Believing, Righteous, Despot of Serbia, Ktetor, patron saint of the Serbian Armed Forces; birth name Stefan Lazarević
	Stephen Štiljanović	1543	17 October [O.S. 4 October]	Right-Believing, Righteous, last Despot of Serbia, husband of Helena Štiljanović
	Stylianos of Paphlagonia	401–621	26 November	Venerable, the Hermit; a.k.a. Stylianus and Stylian
	Swithun of Winchester	862	2 July	Bishop of Winchester, Venerable
	Sylvester I of Rome	335	2 January	Patriarch of Rome, Venerable
	Symmachus of Rome	514	19 July	Patriarch of Rome, Venerable
	Symeon the Metaphrast	c. 960 – c. 1000	9 November	Church Father, Venerable, author of the 10-volume medieval Greek menologion
	Symeon the New Theologian	1022	12 March / 12 October	Theologian, Church Father, Venerable, the New
	Symeon the Studite	986 / 987	12 March	Venerable, spiritual father of St. Symeon the New Theologian; a.k.a. Symeon the Pious and Symeon the Devout,

== See also ==
- List of Eastern Orthodox saint titles
- List of saints in the Russian Orthodox Church
- List of saints of the Serbian Orthodox Church
- List of American Orthodox saints
