= March 19 (Eastern Orthodox liturgics) =

Day in the Eastern Orthodox liturgical calendar

Eastern Orthodox liturgical calendar
March 18	March 19	March 20
March 19 O.S. ≍ April 1 N.S. March 19 N.S ≍ March 6 O.S.

An Eastern Orthodox cross

March 19 in Eastern Orthodox liturgical calendars is a feast day and a day of commemoration of saints and martyrs. Although some Orthodox churches use the Revised Julian Calendar and others use the traditional Julian calendar, the fixed commemorations for their respective March 19 are broadly the same, no matter which calendar is used. (Note: Despite the dates being the same, the days to which they refer typically differ by 13 days. The notation Old Style or O.S. is sometimes used to indicate a date in the traditional Julian Calendar (the "Old Calendar"). The notation New Style or N.S. indicates a date in the Revised Julian calendar (the "New Calendar").)

== Saints ==
- Martyrs Chrysanthus and Daria, and those with them in Rome (283):

- Claudius the Tribune, his wife Hilaria, their sons Jason and Maurus, the priest Diodorus, and the deacon Marianus.

- Martyr Pancharius at Nicomedia (302)

== Pre-Schism Western saints ==
- Saint Joseph the Betrothed (1st century) (see also: December 26)
- Saints Quintus, Quintilla, Quartilla, Mark and Companions, martyrs venerated in Sorrento near Naples in Italy.
- Saints Apollonius and Leontius (Leontinus), by tradition early Bishops of Braga in Portugal (4th century)
- Saint Auxilius, a companion of St Patrick, became Bishop of Killossey (near Naas, County Kildare) in Ireland (c. 460)
- Saint John the Syrian of Pinna, a Syrian monk who settled in Pinna near Spoleto in Italy, became abbot of a large monastic colony there for forty-four years (6th century). (Note: "At Civita-di-Penna, the birthday of blessed John, a man of great holiness, who came from Syria into Italy, where he constructed a monastery, and, after having been the spiritual guide of many servants of God for forty-four years, rested in peace, renowned for great virtue.)
- Saint Leontius of Saintes, Bishop of Saintes (640)
- Saints Landoald and Amantius, a priest and deacon who helped enlighten what is now Belgium and north-eastern France, founded the church at Wintershoven (c. 668) (Note: "At Ghent the Saints Landoaldus, a Roman priest, and the deacon Amantius, who were sent to preach the Gospel by pope St. Martin, and after their death became illustrious by many miracles.")
- Saint Adrian, disciple of St Landoald, murdered while begging alms for his monastery near Maastricht in the Netherlands (c. 668)
- Saint Lactan, born near Cork in Ireland, St Comgall entrusted him to found a monastery at Achadh-Ur, now Freshford, in Kilkenny (672)
- Saint Alcmund (Alchmund of Derby, or of Lilleshall), martyred in Shropshire (c. 800) (Note: A prince of Northumbria in England, after many years of exile among the Picts of Scotland, he was martyred in Shropshire. "The many miracles which followed his martyrdom are a testimony to the holiness of his life. He was buried at Lilieshall, in Shropshire, and afterwards translated to Derby, where a church was erected under his invocation. Thither pilgrims, especially from the North of England, were accustomed to resort, out of veneration for his sacred relics.")
- Saint Gemus, a monk, probably at Moyenmoutier in Alsace, now in France, his relics were enshrined at Hürbach.

== Post-Schism Orthodox saints ==
- Righteous Mary (Maria Shvarnovna), wife of Vsevelod III (1206)
- Saint Bassa, nun, of the Pskov-Caves Monastery (1473) (Note: Glorified in 2003.)
- Venerable Innocent of Komel the Wonderworker, in Vologda (1521), disciple of St. Nilus of Sora.
- New Martyr Demetrius, at Constantinople (1564)
- Saint Sophia of Slutsk and Minsk, descendant of the Sovereigns of the Kyivan-Rus' (1612)
- New Martyr Nicholas Karamanos of Smyrna (1657)
- Saint Symeon (Popović), Archimandrite of Dajbabe Monastery, Montenegro (1941) (Note: See: (in Serbian) Симеон Дајбапски. Википедије, (Serbian Wikipedia).)

=== New martyrs and confessors ===
- Saint John Blinov, Confessor (1932)
- New Martyr Matrona Alexeeva (1938)

== Other commemorations ==
- Smolensk "Umileniye" ("Tender Feeling") Icon of the Most Holy Theotokos.
- Icon of the Mother of God of Lubyatov (15th century)
- Tenderness Icon of the Mother of God of Rostov (2025). (Note: The official communiqué of the Moscow Patriarchate was as follows: (in Russian) "ПОСТАНОВИЛИ: Внести в общецерковный месяцеслов празднование 19 марта (1 апреля) иконы Божией Матери «Умиление» Ростовская.)

== Gallery ==
The Dream of Saint Joseph.
(Menologion of Basil II, 10th century).

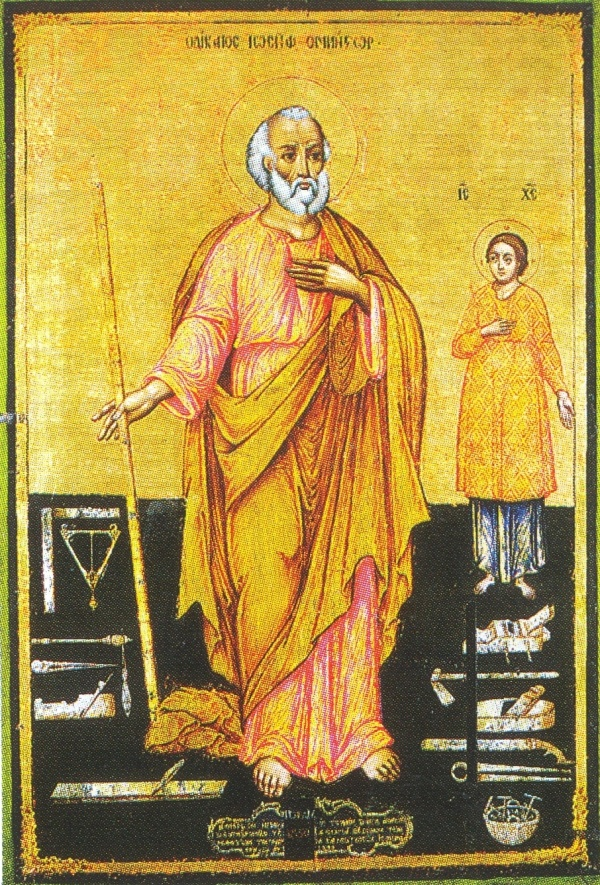
Saint Joseph the Betrothed.

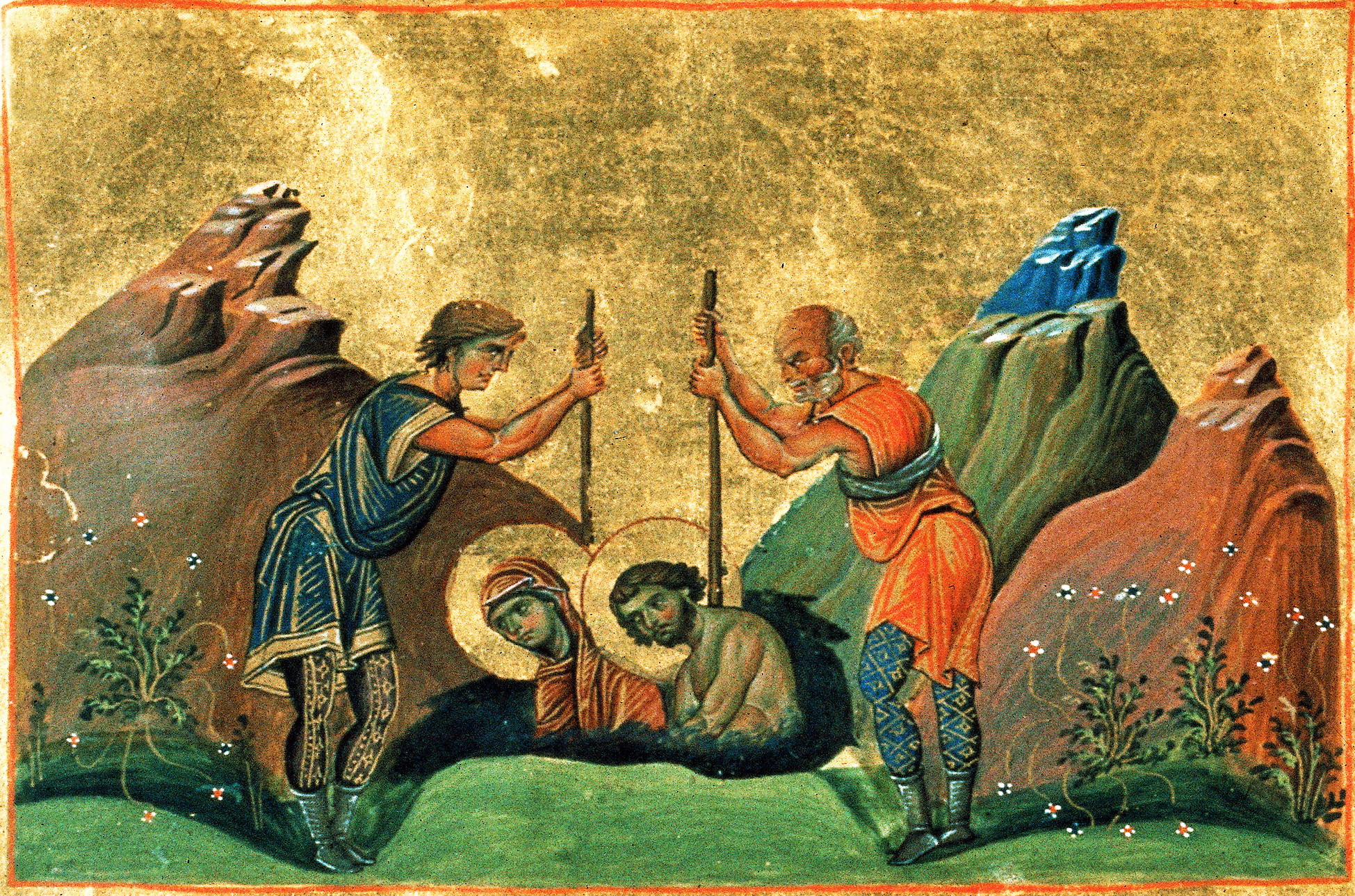
Martyrs Chrysanthus and Daria of Rome.

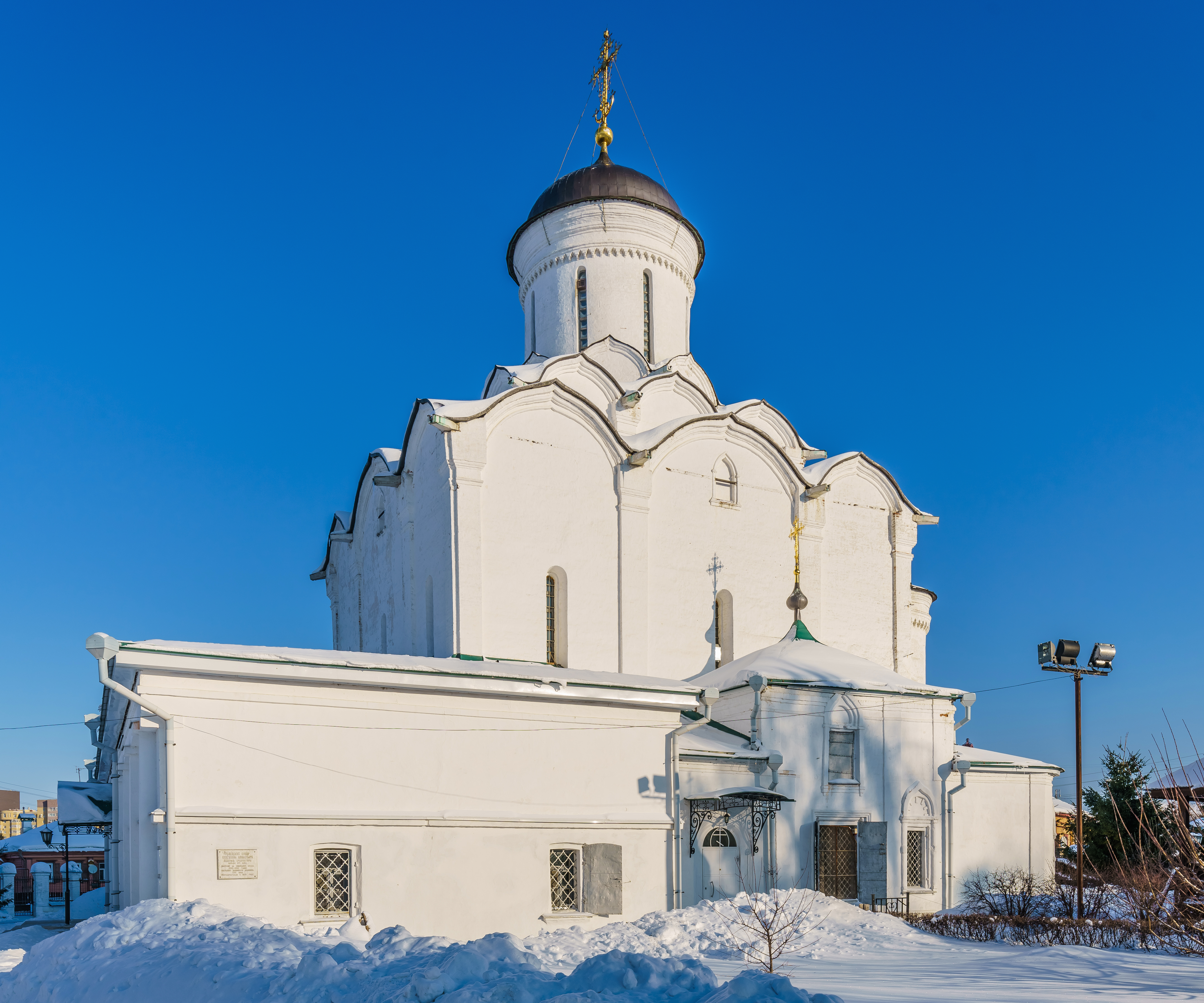
The main church of the Princess Mary's Convent, founded by Maria Shvarnovna in Vladimir.

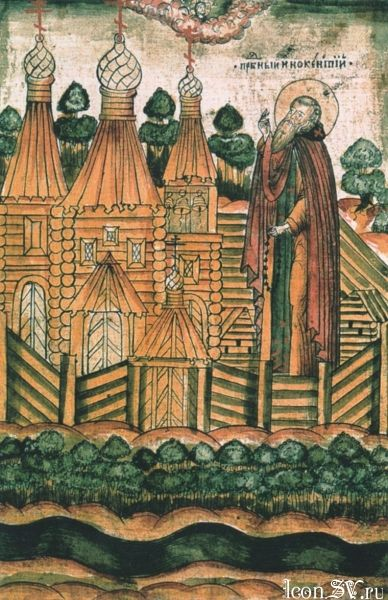
Venerable Innocent of Komel the Wonderworker.

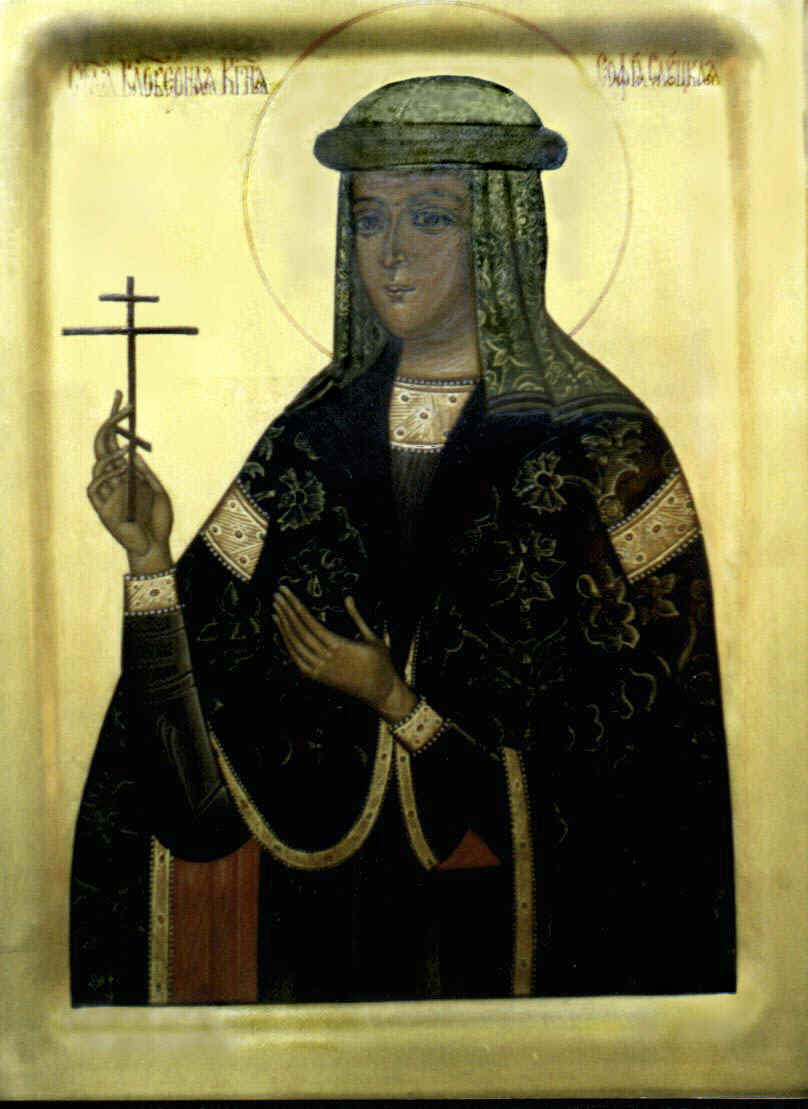
Saint Sophia of Slutsk and Minsk.

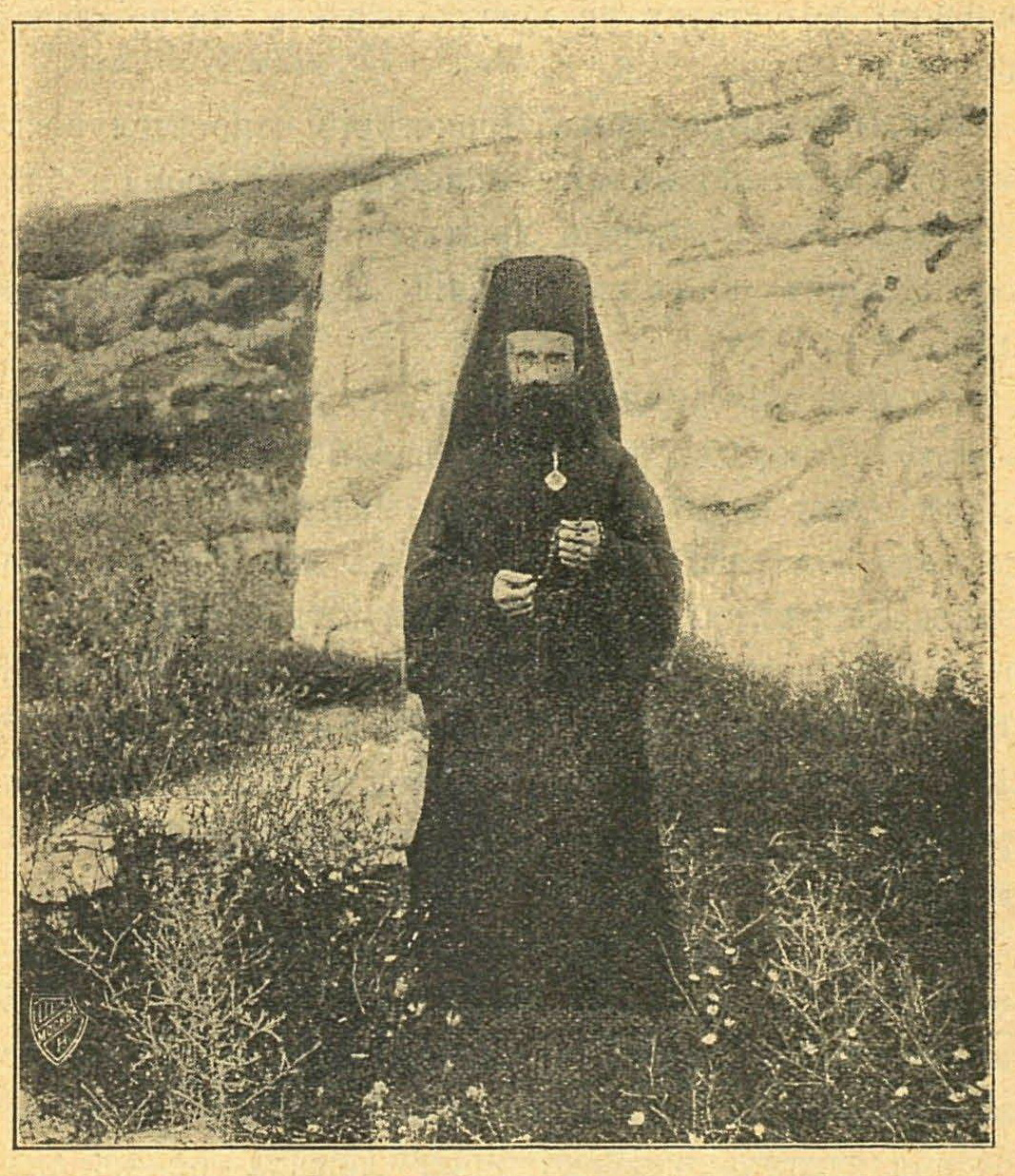
Saint Symeon (Popovic), Archimandrite of Dajbabe Monastery.

== Sources ==
- March 19/April 1. Orthodox Calendar (PRAVOSLAVIE.RU).
- April 1 / March 19. HOLY TRINITY RUSSIAN ORTHODOX CHURCH (A parish of the Patriarchate of Moscow).
- March 19. OCA - The Lives of the Saints.
- The Autonomous Orthodox Metropolia of Western Europe and the Americas (ROCOR). St. Hilarion Calendar of Saints for the year of our Lord 2004. St. Hilarion Press (Austin, TX). pp. 22-23.
- March 19. Latin Saints of the Orthodox Patriarchate of Rome.
- Rev. Richard Stanton. A Menology of England and Wales, or, Brief Memorials of the Ancient British and English Saints Arranged According to the Calendar, Together with the Martyrs of the 16th and 17th Centuries. London: Burns & Oates, 1892. pp. 124-125.
- The Roman Martyrology. Transl. by the Archbishop of Baltimore. Last Edition, According to the Copy Printed at Rome in 1914. Revised Edition, with the Imprimatur of His Eminence Cardinal Gibbons. Baltimore: John Murphy Company, 1916. pp. 80-81.

Greek Sources

- Great Synaxaristes: (in Greek) 19 ΜΑΡΤΙΟΥ. ΜΕΓΑΣ ΣΥΝΑΞΑΡΙΣΤΗΣ.
- (in Greek) Συναξαριστής. 19 Μαρτίου. ECCLESIA.GR. (H ΕΚΚΛΗΣΙΑ ΤΗΣ ΕΛΛΑΔΟΣ).

Russian Sources

- (in Russian) 1 апреля (19 марта). Православная Энциклопедия под редакцией Патриарха Московского и всея Руси Кирилла (электронная версия). (Orthodox Encyclopedia - Pravenc.ru).
- (in Russian) 19 марта (ст.ст.) 1 апреля 2013 (нов. ст.). Русская Православная Церковь Отдел внешних церковных связей. (DECR).
