= Lydia of Thyatira =

Christian saint

Saint Lydia of Thyatira
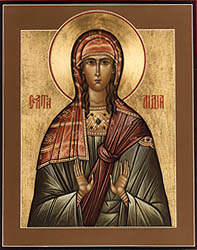

Witness to the Faith
- Honored in: Episcopal Church (United States); Catholic Church; Eastern Orthodox Church
- Feast: 27 January; 3 August; 20 May

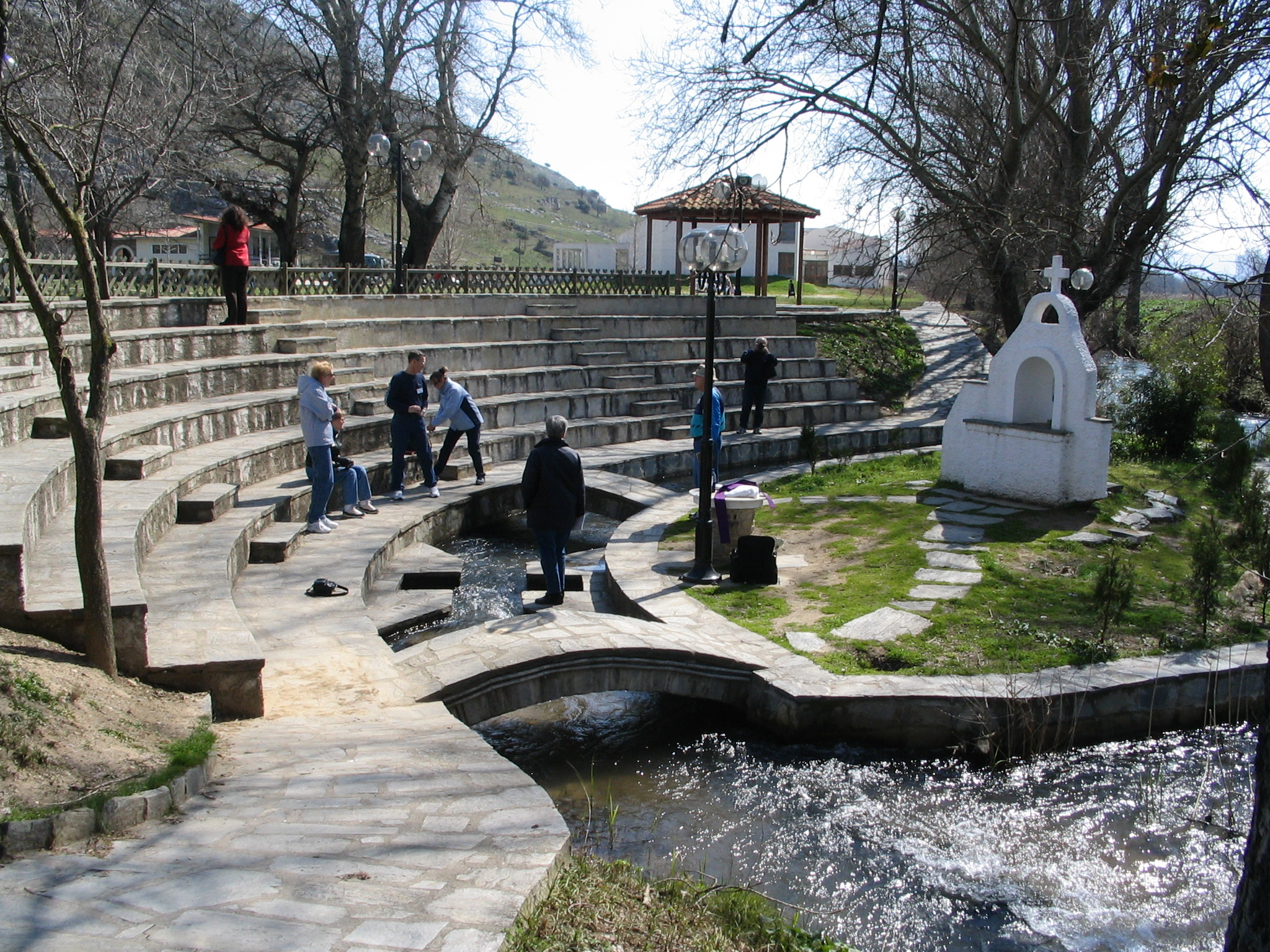
A modern Greek Orthodox outdoor chapel on what is said to be the site where Lydia was baptized

Lydia of Thyatira (Greek: Λυδία) is a woman mentioned in the New Testament who is regarded as the first documented convert to Christianity in Europe. Several Christian denominations have designated her a saint.

== Lydia of Thyatira and Philippi ==
The name "Lydia", meaning "the Lydian woman", by which she was known indicates that she was from Lydia in Asia Minor. Though she is commonly known as "St. Lydia" or even more simply "The Woman of Purple", Lydia is given other titles: "of Thyatira", "Purpuraria", and "of Philippi ('Philippisia' in Greek)". "[Lydia's] name is an ethnicon, deriving from her place of origin". The first refers to her place of birth, a city in the ancient region of Lydia (modern-day Akhisar, Turkey). The second comes from the Latin word for purple and relates to her connection with purple dye. Lydia was living in Philippi in modern-day (Greek) Macedonia when she met St. Paul and his companions. All these titles expound upon her background.

== New Testament narrative ==
Acts 16 describes Lydia as follows:

A certain woman named Lydia, a seller of purple, of the city of Thyatira, one who worshiped God, heard us; whose heart the Lord opened to listen to the things which were spoken by Paul. When she and her household were baptized, she begged us, saying, "If you have judged me to be faithful to the Lord, come into my house, and stay." So she persuaded us.

— Acts 16:14–15 World English Bible

Wayne Grudem sees the story of Lydia as an example of effectual calling.

== Background ==
Lydia was most likely Ancient Greek, since she originated from Thyatira, Asia Minor, but probably a romanized one, as she lived in a Roman settlement. She was evidently a well-to-do agent of a purple-dye firm in Thyatira, a city southeast of Pergamum and about 40 miles (64 km) inland, across the Aegean Sea from Athens. Lydia insisted on giving hospitality to Apostle Paul and his companions in Philippi. They stayed with her until their departure, through Amphipolis and Apollonia, to Thessalonica (Acts 16:40–17:1).

Paul, Silas, and Timothy were traveling through the region of Philippi when they encountered "a reputable businesswoman and possibly a widow... [who] was a righteous Gentile or 'God-fearer' attracted to Judaism". "[S]he was one of a large group [considered]... sympathizers with Judaism, believers in the one God, but who had not yet become 'proselytes' or taken the final step to conversion to Judaism".

Because these encounters and events take place "in what is now Europe", Lydia is considered "the first 'European' Christian convert".

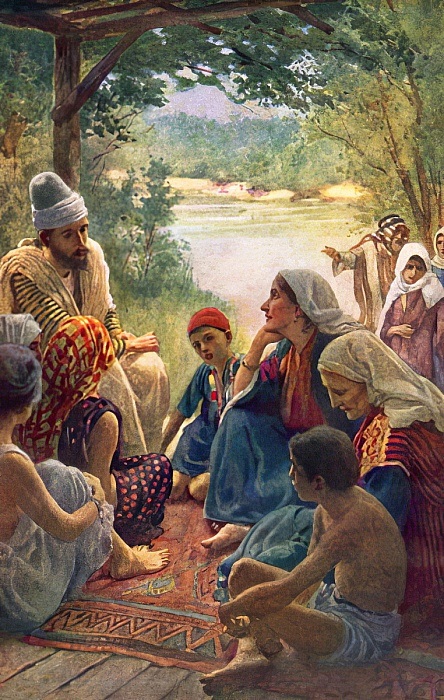
Lydia of Thyatira by Harold Copping

=== Profession ===
"Thyatira in the province of Lydia (located in what is now western Turkey) was famous for the red [variety of purple] dye". Lydia of Thyatira is most known as a "seller" or merchant of purple cloth, the likely reason the Catholic Church named her "patroness of dyers". It is unclear whether Lydia dealt only in purple dye or also textiles, but all known icons of the saint depict her with some form of purple cloth. Most portray her wearing a purple shawl or veil, leading many historians and theologians to believe she was a merchant of specifically purple cloth.

=== Social status ===
There is some speculation about Lydia's social status. Theologians disagree as to whether Lydia was a free woman or servant. "There is no direct evidence that Lydia had once been a slave, but the fact that her name is her place of origin rather than a personal name suggests this as at least a possibility". Ascough cites other examples of noblewomen named Lydia from the 1st and 2nd centuries, so it is unlikely that she was actually a slave or servant. Furthermore, the book of Acts records, "When she and the members of her household were baptized, she invited us to her home. 'If you consider me a believer in the Lord,' she said, 'come and stay at my house.' And she persuaded us." This implies that Lydia was in charge of the household, as she was able to persuade the household to be baptised, and had authority in the home to invite Paul and his companions to stay in her house—things a servant would be far less able to do.

=== Marital status ===
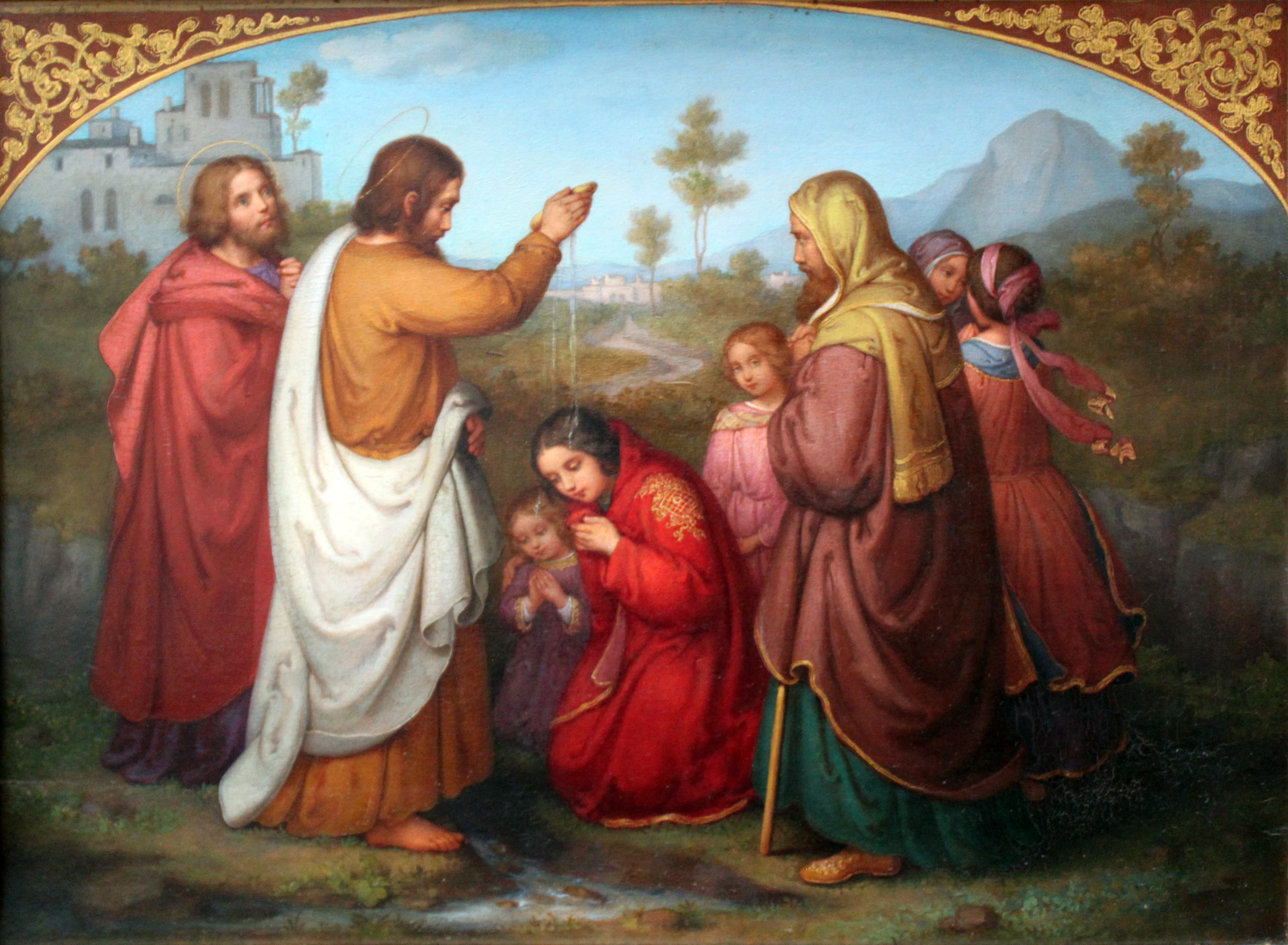
Baptism of Lydia by Marie Ellenrieder, 1861

Because women did not have the equal rights of modern women, it seems unusual that Lydia could invite a group of foreign men to her house without a man's consent. "The fact that there is no mention of a man has been used to deduce that she was a widow, but this has been challenged as a patriarchal interpretation". Lydia's social power, exemplified by her control of a household and ownership of a house (which she offered to St. Paul and his companions), indicates that she was most likely a free woman and possibly a widow.

== Feast day ==
Many Christian denominations recognize Lydia of Thyatira as a saint, though her feast day varies.

Her feast day in the Roman Rite of the Catholic Church is May 20 in the Ordinary Form and August 3 in the Extraordinary Form.

She is commemorated on May 20 in the Greek Catholic Churches.

Eastern Orthodox Churches remember Lydia on various days, with some jurisdictions remembering her twice during a liturgical year. Many Eastern Orthodox churches, including the Self-Ruled Antiochian Orthodox Christian Archdiocese of North America, remember St. Lydia on May 20. Some divisions of the Russian Orthodox Church (other than the Orthodox Church in America) observe both June 25 and March 27 as her feast days.

The Episcopal Church honors St. Lydia in its liturgical calendar on May 21, while the Anglican Church in North America remembers St. Lydia on January 27.

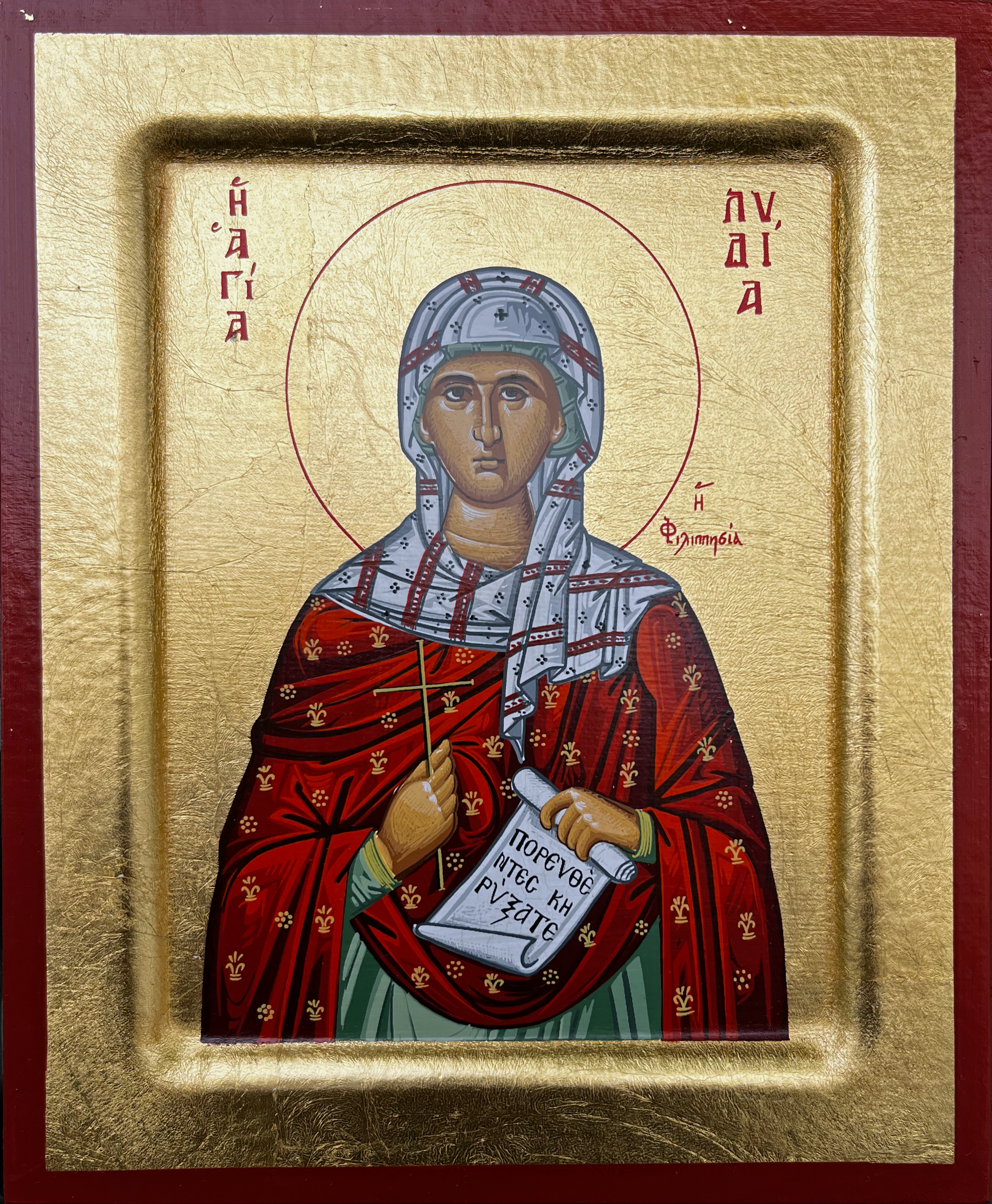
Greek icon of Lydia of Thyatira

The Lutheran community is also divided. The ELCA commemorates Sts. Lydia, Dorcas and Phoebe on January 27, while the LCMS celebrates the three women on October 25.

== Devotion ==
The Orthodox Churches have given Lydia the title "Equal to the Apostles", which signifies her importance and level of holiness. There is a church in Philippi that many believe was built in her honor. A modern baptistry is on the traditional site in Krynides where St. Paul baptized Lydia.

== See also ==
- Deborah
- Feminist theology
- Junia (New Testament person)
- Phoebe
