= Marcus Eremita =

Christian theologian, saint, and ascetic writer

Saint Marcus Eremita
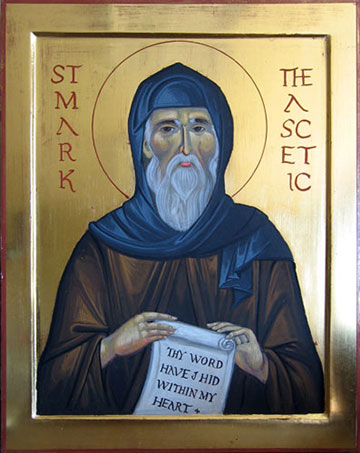
- Venerated in: Eastern Orthodoxy; Roman Catholicism
- Feast: 20 May
- Influences: St John Chrysostom

Marcus Eremita, Mark the Ascetic or Marcus the Ascetic (Note: also known as Markos Eremites, Marcus the Hermit, Mark the Hermit, Mark the Monk and other similar names.) was a Christian theologian, saint, and ascetic writer of the fifth century AD.

Mark is rather an ascetic than a dogmatic writer. He is content to accept dogmas from the Church; his interest is in the spiritual life as it should be led by monks. He is practical rather than mystic, belongs to the Antiochene School and is said to be a disciple of John Chrysostom.

== Identification ==
Various theories about his period and works have been advanced. According to J. Kunze, Mark the Hermit was superior of a laura at Ancyra; he then as an old man left his monastery and became a hermit, probably in the desert east of Palestine, near Mar Saba. He was a contemporary of Nestorius and died after 430 but probably before the Council of Chalcedon (451).

Nicephorus Callistus (fourteenth century) says he was a disciple of John Chrysostom ("Hist. Eccl." in Patrologia Graeca, CXLVI, XlV, 30). Cardinal Bellarmine (De Script. eccl. (1631), p. 273) thought that this Mark was the monk who prophesied ten more years of life to the Emperor Leo VI in 900. He is refuted by Tillemont.

Another view supported by the Byzantine Menaia identifies him with the Egyptian monk mentioned in Palladius, who lived in the fourth century. The discovery and identification of a work by him against Nestorius by P. Kerameus makes his period certain, as defended by Kunze.

Some records indicate that he was the same person from Tartus who corresponded with Severus of Antioch.

According to a brief entry in the "Great Synaxaristes" of the Eastern Orthodox Church, his feast day is observed on 20 May.

== Works ==
His works were written in Greek and are preserved in good manuscripts (SC 445, 455). Most were translated to Syriac, and these Syriac writings are also available in manuscripts. His writings were widespread among members of the Church of the East; an example is a commentary that exists on "On the Spiritual Law" (CPG 6090) by Babai the Great (d. 628). Further Arabic translations were made as well.

Mark's works are traditionally the following:

1. Of the spiritual law,
2. Concerning those who think to be justified through works (both ascetic treatises for monks);
3. Of penitence;
4. Of baptism;
5. To Nicholas on refraining from anger and lust;
6. Disputation against a scholar (against appearing to civil courts and on celibacy);
7. Consultation of the mind with its own soul (reproaches that he makes Adam, Satan, and other men responsible for his sins instead of himself);
8. On fasting and humility;
9. On Melchisedek (against the belief that Melchisedek was an apparition of the Word of God).
10. Against the Nestorians (a treatise against that Christology arranged without order).

The first nine works are named and described in the "Myrobiblion" and are published in Gallandi's collection. The eighth is now considered spurious.

Excerpts of his writings are also included in the Philokalia.

== Sources ==
- Andrea Gallandi, Bibliotheca veterum Patrum, VIII (Venice, 1788), 1–104, reprinted with Gallandi's prolegomena in Patrologia Graeca, LXV, 893–1140;
- J. A. Fabricius-G. C. Harles, Bibliotheca graeca, IX (Hamburg, 1804), 267–69;
- Bernard Jungmann-Josef Fessler, Institutiones Patrologiae, II, (Innsbruck, 1892), 143–46;
- Johannes Kunze (Theologe), Marcus Eremita, ein neuer Zeuge fur das altkirchliche Taufbekenntnis (Leipzig, 1896).
- Georges-Mathieu de Durand (1999), Marc le Moine, Traités (two volumes)
- Brock, Sebastian Patrick (2011). Brock, Sebastian P.; Butts, Aaron Michael; Kiraz, George A.; Rompay, Lucas Van (eds.). Gorgias Encyclopedic Dictionary of the Syriac Heritage. Gorgias Press, LLC. ISBN 9781593337148.
