= Anthimos of Chios =

Schema-monk, wonderworker, and saint (1869-1960)

Saint Anthimos of Chios

Wonderworker, Hieromonk
- Born: Argyrios K. Bagianos; July 1, 1869; Livadion, Chios, Kingdom of Greece
- Died: February 15, 1960; Chios, Kingdom of Greece
- Resting place: Monastery of Panagia Voithea
- Honored in: Eastern Orthodox Church
- Canonized: August 14, 1992, St. George's Cathedral, Istanbul, Turkey by Ecumenical Patriarchate of Constantinople
- Major shrine: Monastery of Panagia Voithea
- Feast: 15 February
- Influenced: Nikephoros the Leper

Anthimos of Chios (Note: Also spelt Anthimus, secular name Argyrios K. Bagianos) (Greek: Άνθιμος Χίου; July 1, 1869 - February 15, 1960), was a schema-monk, wonderworker, and saint, venerated in the Eastern Orthodox Church. He was glorified by the Ecumenical Patriarchate of Constantinople on 14 August 1992. His feast day is celebrated on February 15.

== Life ==
Argyrios K. Bagianos, later Anthimos was born in Livadion, Chios on 1 July 1869, to parents Constantine and Argyro. After visiting Nea Moni at the age of 8, Saint Nectarios, at that time a deacon, told his Hegumen “Elder, do you see that child? Someday he will become a Saint.” Argyrios had little formal education and soon renounced the earthly world and became a monastic after visiting the Monastery of the Holy Fathers in Chios to restore his icon of Panagia Voithea. He was guided by Elder Pachomios who tonsured him to the lesser schema, giving him the name Anthimos. His local bishop refused to ordain him to the priesthood due to his lack of education, so he was instead ordained by the Bishop of Smyrna in 1910. In 1911 Anthimos went to Mount Athos, and received many honours. He later returned to Chios in 1912 to work at the lepers home there, where he advised Nikephoros the Leper to live, becoming his spiritual father. In 1927 he founded the Monastery of Panagia Voithea for nuns fleeing Asia Minor, after receiving a vision of the Panagia. After a long ministry, Anthimos passed at the age of 90, on February 15, 1960, 18 days after performing his last divine liturgy.

== Miracles ==
Anthimos was said to have performed many miracles, including exorcising 13 demons from a woman named Justina who was plagued by 14 of them, healing Styliani and her sister Sevasti Hatzigeorgiou, a woman named Tsikitridaina, an unamed Cypriot tanner, a young priest named George Aspiotis, a man named John Diatsintos (possessed by Beelzebub), two brothers Pantelis and George, an englishman named John and his cousin's daughter Angelica, a woman named Marouko, a woman named Helen Moschouris, another woman named Helen, wife of John, from their demonic possessions. He also healed a young boy, Panagiotis, son of Maria's blindness, Kalliopi N. Fasola's breast cancer, and the Chios Senator Mr. Rodokanakis from his unknown ailment. Finally he dissolved the incorrupt hand of one Viki, who had died at 18 and whose right hand's nails had continued to grow after her death.

== Life ==
Anthimos was glorified by the Ecumenical Patriarchate of Constantinople on 14 August 1992. His relics are located at the Monastery of Panagia Voithea which he founded.
