= Plautilla =

Early Christian matron in apocryphal accounts of Paul's martyrdom

Saint Plautilla
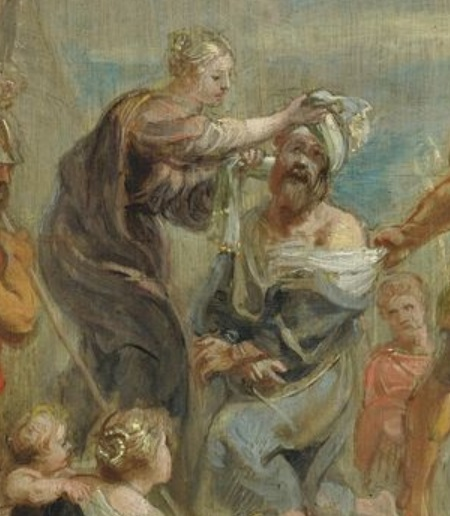
- Plautilla lends her veil to Saint Paul in The Martyrdom of Saint Paul (detail), attributed to Peter Paul Rubens
- Died: c. 67
- Venerated in: Roman Catholic Church · Eastern Orthodox Church
- Feast: 20 May

Plautilla (d. c. 67) is a name attached in late antique and medieval tradition to a pious Roman matron associated with the martyrdom of the Apostle Paul. In apocryphal narratives and later retellings, she encounters Paul as he is led to execution outside the city and lends him her veil so he may blindfold himself; after his beheading, the veil is miraculously returned to her.

== Sources and legend ==
The earliest detailed version of the veil motif appears in the late antique/early medieval apocryphon known as the Martyrium Pauli (Martyrdom of Paul), transmitted under the name of Linus; section 16 recounts that Paul "bound his eyes with Plautilla's veil" before execution.

Medieval compendia, especially Jacobus de Voragine's Golden Legend, repeat and popularize the episode (often giving Plautilla the alternative name "Lemobia"), relating that as Paul was led to execution at the Ostian Gate the Christian woman Plautilla wept and asked for his prayers; he replied, "Plautilla, my dear daughter, lend me the veil with which thy head is covered. I shall cover my eyes therewith, and then thou shalt take it back," after which scoffers mocked her for giving so precious a cloth to an "enchanter," and the veil was miraculously returned to her.

== Liturgical commemoration ==
In the Byzantine tradition Plautilla ("Πλατίλλα ἡ Ῥωμαία") is commemorated on 20 May.

According to tradition, she lived in the 1st century AD in Rome and was baptized by the Apostle Peter, and is regarded as the mother of Saint Domitilla. She died by martyrdom in AD 67.

== In art and reception ==
The "veil of Plautilla" became a recognizable motif in Western art illustrating Paul's beheading and posthumous miracle. Museum collection entries and art-historical studies identify the scene where Paul requests a woman's veil and later returns it miraculously:

- The Princeton University Art Museum panel traditionally titled The Beheading of Saint Paul has been read in light of the "miracle of Plautilla's veil," discussed by Guy C. Bauman (1977).
- An Italian trecento initial at the J. Paul Getty Museum depicts The Beheading of Saint Paul and the Miracle of Plautilla's Veil.
- The Museum of Fine Arts, Boston holds a Flemish tapestry titled Saint Paul Requesting Plautilla's Veil, explicitly citing the Golden Legend as its narrative source.

== See also ==
- Acts of Paul
- List of early Christian saints
