= Nikephoros the Leper =

Schema-monk, leper and saint (1890–1964)

Saint Nikephoros the Leper

Monk of the Great Schema
- Born: Nicholas Tzanakakis; 1890; Sikari, Chania, Kingdom of Greece
- Died: January 4, 1964 (aged 73–74); Athens, Kingdom of Greece
- Cause of death: Leprosy
- Honored in: Eastern Orthodox Church
- Canonized: December 1st 2012, St. George's Cathedral, Istanbul, Turkey by Synod of the Ecumenical Patriarchate
- Major shrine: Church of Saint Nikephoros the Leper, Sikari
- Feast: January 4
- Patronage: Leprosy
- Influences: Anthimos of Chios
- Major works: An Eye-Witness Account of Miracles by St. Anthimos of Chios

Nikephoros the Leper (Note: Also spelled Nicephorus, secular name Nicholas Tzanakakis) (Greek: Νικηφόρος ο Λεπρός; 1890 – January 4, 1964), was a schema-monk, leper and saint, venerated in the Eastern Orthodox Church. He was glorified by the Synod of the Ecumenical Patriarchate on December 1, 2012. His feast day is celebrated on January 4.

== Life ==
Nicholas Tzanakakis, later Nikephoros was born in the mountain village of Sikari near Chania, in the neighborhood of Kostoyianides. His parents died when he was a young child, leaving him to live with his grandfather. At the age of 13 he left his home to work in Chania where he became a barber's apprentice. Around that time he first started showing signs of leprosy. At the age of 16, the signs of leprosy became more obvious, so in order to avoid isolation on a leper colony in the island of Spinalonga, he fled to Alexandria. There he continued to work in a barber shop where his disease continued to develop. There he met St. Anthimos of Chios who advised him to go to a church for lepers in Chios. Nicholas arrived there at the age of 24, and took residence in a leper hospital there, where the icon of Panagia Ypakoe was kept. 2 years later he was tonsured a schema monk and took the name Nikephoros. There he lived a quiet life of fasting and prayer. In 1957, the leper hospital in Chios was closed, and Nikephoros, now aged 67, moved to Saint Barbara's Home for Lepers in Athens. By this time Nikephoros was almost completely blind, and was chanting only the prayers he knew off by heart, telling all his visitors to pray the Jesus Prayer. In 1961, he wrote a letter to the Abbess of the Monastery of Panagia Voithea detailing the miracles of his spiritual father Anthimos of Chios, this being his only well known writing. Nikephoros died on January 4, 1964, succumbing to his leprosy.

== Veneration ==
Nikephoros was canonised by the Synod of the Ecumenical Patriarchate on December 1, 2012. A church in his hometown dedicated to him was consecrated on October 2, 2018, by Bartholomew I of Constantinople, Chrysostomos II of Cyprus, and Irenaeos of Crete [gr].
