= Stephen of Piperi =

17th-century Eastern Orthodox Saint canonised by the Serbian Orthodox Church

Saint Stephen of Piperi Стефан Пиперски Stefan Piperski
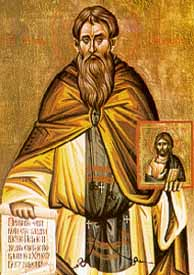
- Serbian orthodox Icon of Stephen of Piperi
- Church: Serbian Orthodox Church

Personal details
- Denomination: Eastern Orthodox Christian (Serbian Orthodox Christian)

Sainthood
- Feast day: 30 May
- Canonized: by Serbian Orthodox Church

Stephen of Piperi (Serbian: Свети Стефан Пиперски) (died May 20, 1697) is a saint of the Serbian Orthodox Church.

== Life ==
He was born into the Nikšić clan in the village of Kuti in Župa of poor but devout parents, Radoje and Jaćima Krulanović. According to tradition, he first lived a life of asceticism in the Morača monastery where he was abbot. The Turks drove him out of Morača and he settled in Rovacki, Turmanj in the place which today is called Celište. In 1660 he settled in Piperi in a cell where he remained in labor and asceticism until his death. He died peacefully on May 20, 1697. His relics still repose there and are claimed to produce miracles. His feast day is celebrated on the anniversary of his repose, on May 20.
