= May 20 (Eastern Orthodox liturgics) =

Day in the Eastern Orthodox liturgical calendar

Eastern Orthodox liturgical calendar
May 19	May 20	May 21
May 20 O.S. ≍ June 2 N.S. May 20 N.S ≍ May 7 O.S.

An Eastern Orthodox cross

May 20 in Eastern Orthodox liturgical calendars is a feast day and a day of commemoration of saints and martyrs. Although some Orthodox churches use the Revised Julian Calendar and others use the traditional Julian calendar, the fixed commemorations for their respective May 20 are broadly the same, no matter which calendar is used. (Note: Despite the dates being the same, the days to which they refer typically differ by 13 days. The notation Old Style or O.S. is sometimes used to indicate a date in the traditional Julian Calendar (the "Old Calendar"). The notation New Style or N.S. indicates a date in the Revised Julian calendar (the "New Calendar").)

== Saints ==
- Saint Lydia of Thyatira (Lydia of Philippi), mentioned in Acts 16:14-15 (1st century) (Note: The Church honours Saint Lydia as "Equal-to-the-Apostles." Name days celebrated today include: Lydia (Λυδία).)
- Martyrs Thalelaeus the Unmercenary, and his companions Alexander and Asterius, at Aegae in Cilicia (284) (Note: Certain monasteries honoured Saint Thalelaeus' feast day on September 3, and others on August 23, the day on which he was brought to trial.)
- Martyr Asclas of the Thebaid, Egypt (287)
- Saints Zabulon and Susanna, of Cappadocia and Jerusalem, parents of St. Nina (Nino), enlightener of Georgia (4th century)
- Saint Mark the Hermit (Marcus Eremita) (5th century)
- Holy Martyrs of Mamilla, Jerusalem (614)
- Saint Thalassius the Myrrh-gusher, of Libya (648) (Note: Not to be confused with Thalassius of Syria (February 22).)
- Saints Nicetas, John and Joseph, founders of the Monastery of Nea Moni on Chios (c. 1050)

== Pre-Schism Western saints ==
- Saint Plautilla the Roman, martyr, (67) (Note: Saint Plautilla is regarded as the mother of Saint Domitilla (May 12).)
- Hieromartyr Baudelius, missionary in France and northern Spain, martyred in Nîmes (2nd or 3rd century)
- Virgin-martyr Basilla (304)
- Saint Hilary (Hilarius, Hilaire), Bishop of Toulouse in France (360)
- Saint Anastasius, Bishop of Brescia in Lombardy, in Italy (610) (Note: Saint Anastasius greatly contributed to the conversion of the Lombards from Arianism.)
- Saint Austregisilus (Aoustrille, Outrille), Bishop of Bourges and Confessor (624)
- Saint Theodore of Pavia, Bishop of Pavia (778)
- Martyr Ethelbert (Albert, Albright), King of East Anglia in England (794) (see also May 29)
- Saint Alcuin of York, monk (804) (Note: Alcuin is venerated by Eastern Orthodox Christians in the British Isles and Ireland. The Orthodox Fellowship of John the Baptist publishes a liturgical calendar that is widely used in that region, and this calendar includes a feast for St Alcuin.)

== Post-Schism Orthodox saints ==
- St. Daumantas of Pskov (Dovmont-Timothy), Prince of Pskov (1299)
- Saint Stephen, Abbot of Piperi Monastery in Serbia (1697)

=== New martyrs and confessors ===
- New Hieromartyr Pavel Lazarev, martyred on the feast of Pentecost (1919) (Note: Red partisans took Fr. Pavel and interrogated him in the local elementary school. As a condition of his release, Fr. Pavel was asked to declare that he had deceived people with a made-up God and to publicly remove his cross and cassock. He firmly declared that he would never renounce God and that he was ready to accept death for his faith in Christ. Fr. Pavel was martyred on the feast of Pentecost, June 2, in 1919. Seriously wounded after being shot, he was left to die in the forest near Nikitovka.))
- New Martyr Olympiada Verbetskaya, Abbess of Kozelshchinsk Convent (uk), Poltava (1938) (Note: She suffered martyrdom under communism on June 2, 1938. "On April 18, 2008, at the meeting of St. Synod of the UOC, the former abbess of the Kozelshchyna Monastery Olympiada II was canonized as a locally venerated saint. On June 2, 2008, a solemn glorification of her as a venerable martyr was held in the Kozelshchyna monastery (uk).")

== Other commemorations ==
- Translation of the holy relics (1087) of Saint Nicholas the Wonderworker (343) (Note: According to the Great Synaxaristes, the holy relics were taken from Myra in Lycia on April 1 1087, and arrived in Bari on May 20.) (see also: May 9)
- Uncovering of the relics (1431) of St. Alexis, Metropolitan of Kiev and all Rus', Wonderworker (1378)
- Repose of Schema-monk Cyriacus of Valaam (1798)

== Icon gallery ==
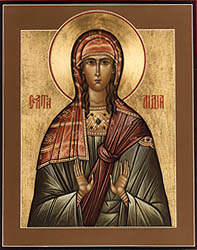
St. Lydia of Thyatira.

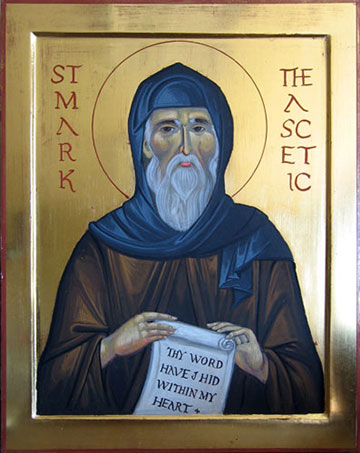
St. Marcus Eremita.

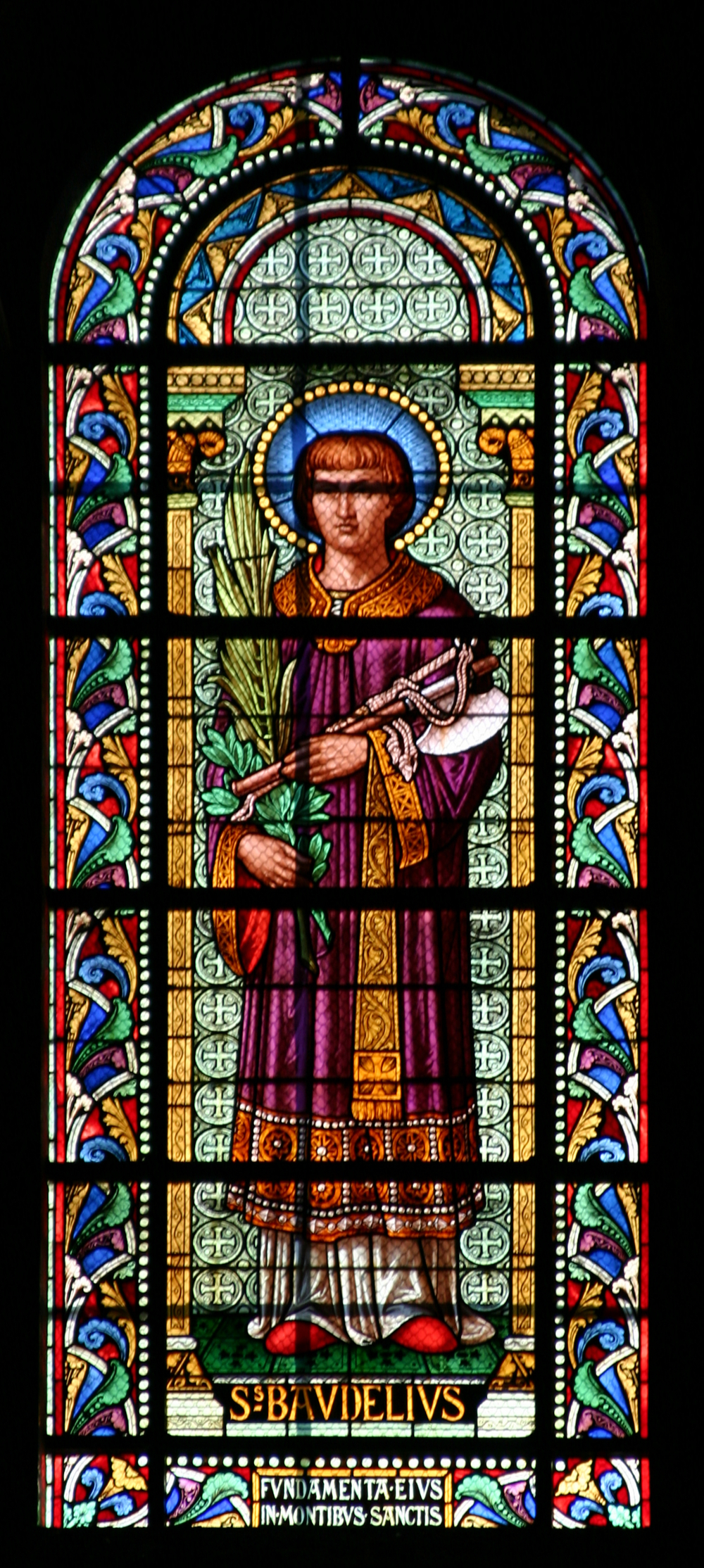
Hieromartyr Baudelius.

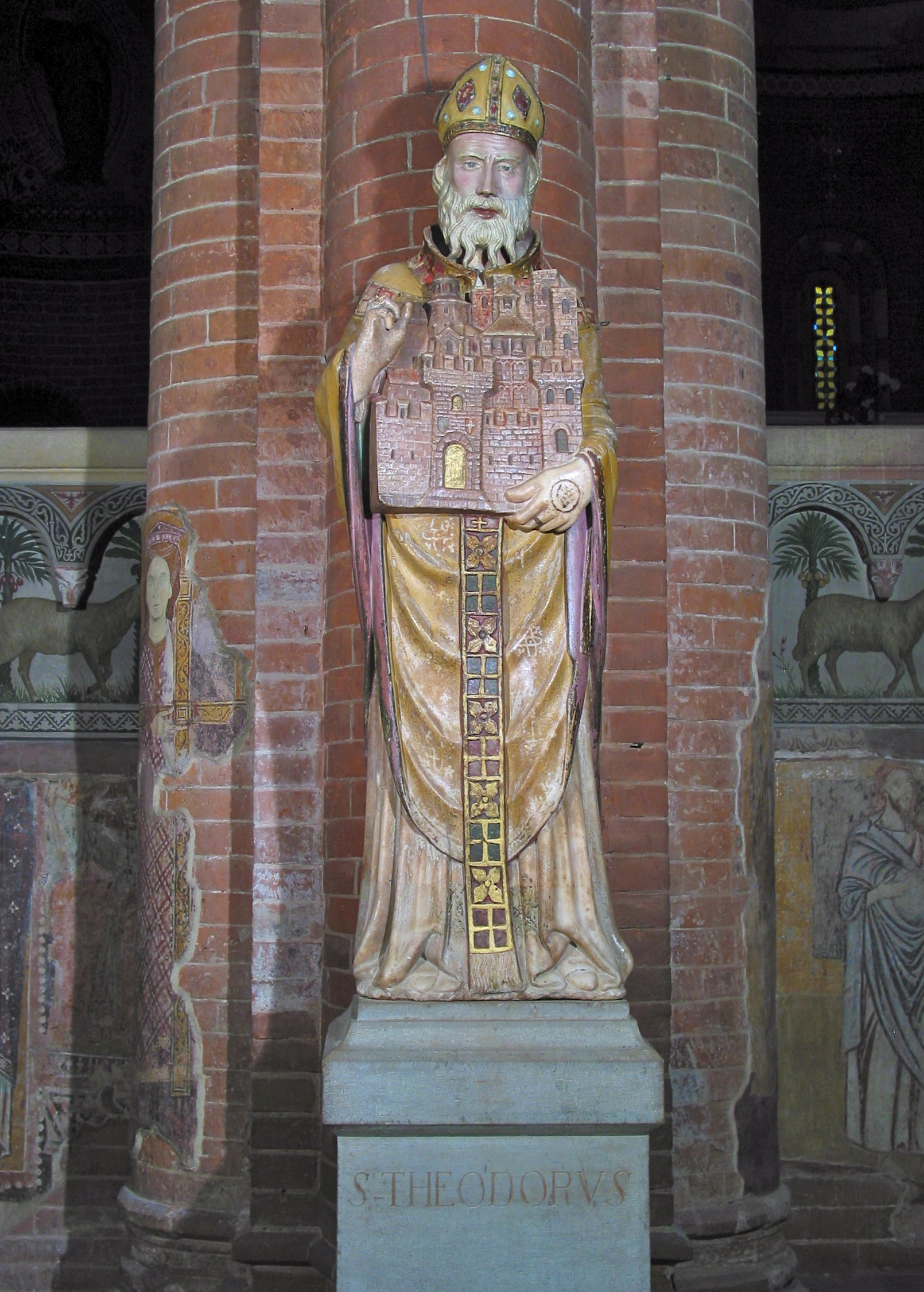
Statue of St. Theodore of Pavia.

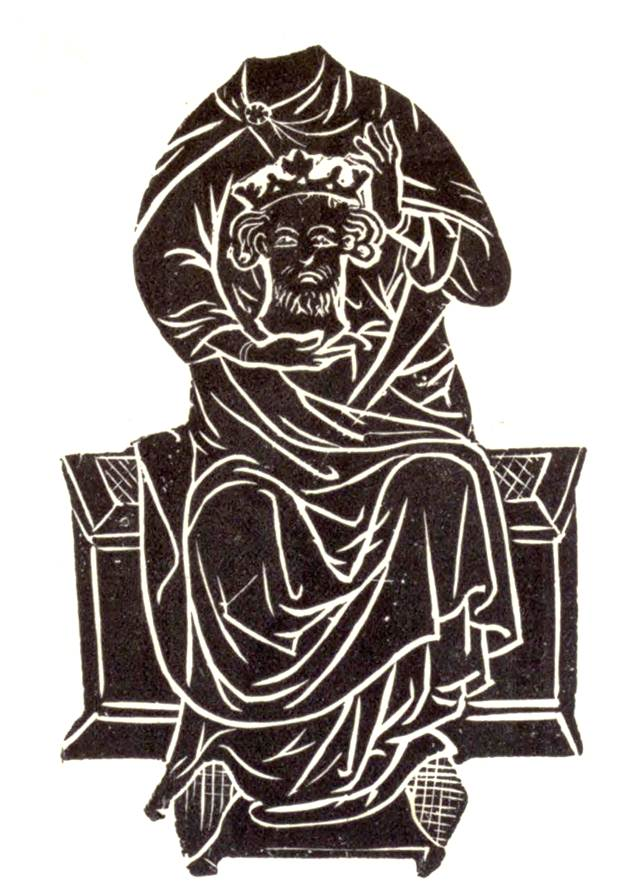
The martyred Anglo-Saxon king Æthelberht II of East Anglia (depiction of a brass plate from Hereford Cathedral).

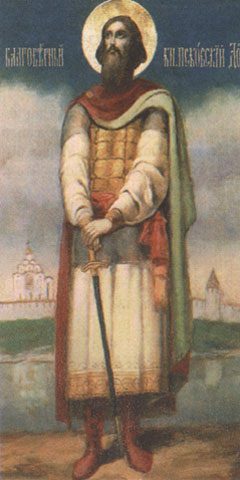
St. Daumantas of Pskov.

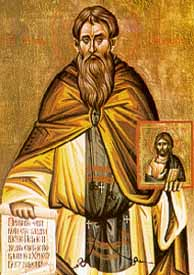
St. Stephen of Piperi.

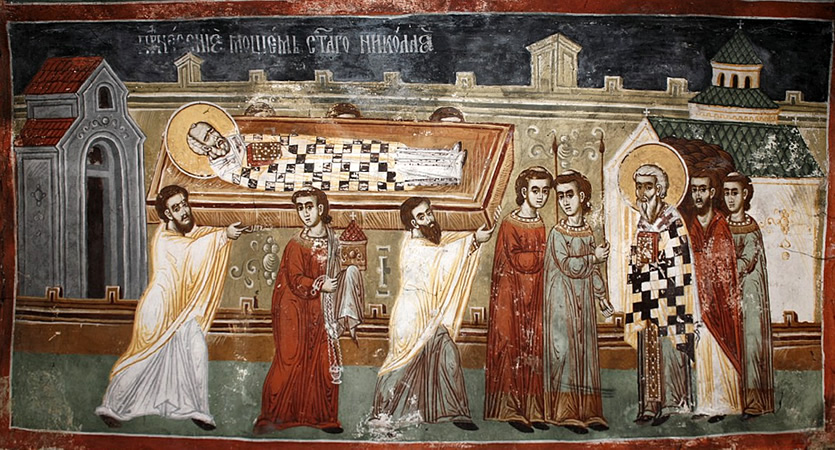
Translation of the Relics of Saint Nicholas from Myra to Bari.

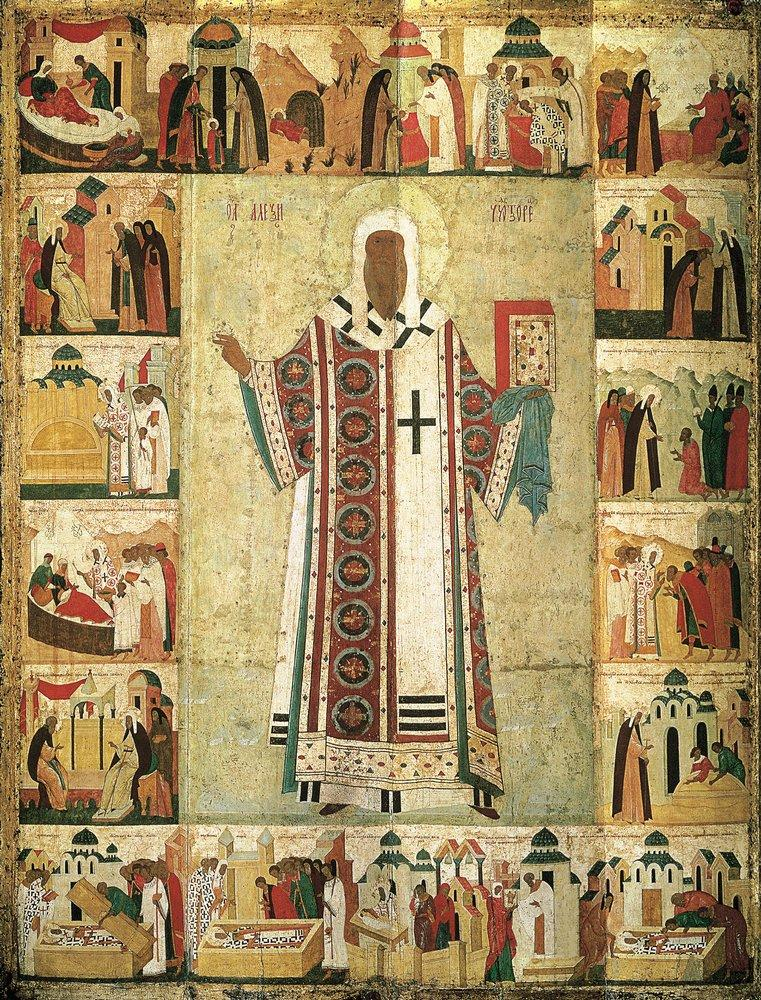
St. Alexius, Metropolitan of Moscow.

== Sources ==
- May 20/June 2. Orthodox Calendar (PRAVOSLAVIE.RU).
- June 2 / May 20. HOLY TRINITY RUSSIAN ORTHODOX CHURCH (A parish of the Patriarchate of Moscow).
- May 20. OCA - The Lives of the Saints.
- May 20. Latin Saints of the Orthodox Patriarchate of Rome.
- May 20. The Roman Martyrology.

Greek Sources

- Great Synaxaristes: (in Greek) 20 ΜΑΪΟΥ. ΜΕΓΑΣ ΣΥΝΑΞΑΡΙΣΤΗΣ.
- (in Greek) Συναξαριστής. 20 Μαΐου. ECCLESIA.GR. (H ΕΚΚΛΗΣΙΑ ΤΗΣ ΕΛΛΑΔΟΣ).

Russian Sources

- (in Russian) 2 июня (20 мая). Православная Энциклопедия под редакцией Патриарха Московского и всея Руси Кирилла (электронная версия). (Orthodox Encyclopedia - Pravenc.ru).
- (in Russian) 20 мая (ст.ст.) 2 июня 2013 (нов. ст.). Русская Православная Церковь Отдел внешних церковных связей. (DECR).
