= Quadratus (martyr) =

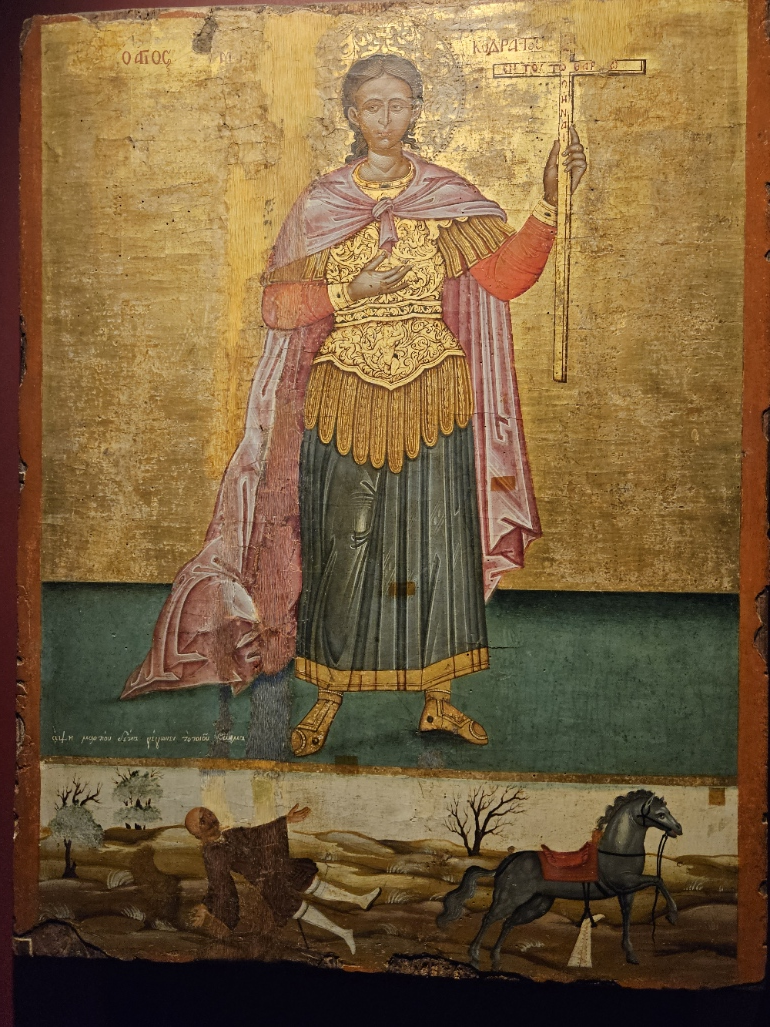
Quadratus of Corinth tied by the feet to chariot

In addition to Quadratus of Athens (one of the Seventy Disciples), there are several Christian saints with the name Quadratus (sometimes spelled Codratus, Kodratus, Ancient Greek: Κοδρᾶτος):

== Quadratus of Africa ==
Quadratus of Africa was martyred in Africa Proconsularis on an unknown date. He was the subject of a panegyric by Saint Augustine of Hippo. His feast day is celebrated on 26 May.

== Quadratus of Corinth ==
Quadratus of Corinth was born on a mountain near Corinth, where his mother had fled to escape a persecution, during the third century, against Christians. He was a hermit and healer.

During the Decian persecution, unable to persuade Quadratus and his friends Cyprian, Dionysius, Anectus, Paul, Crescens, Leonid etc. (circa 20 persons) to deny Christ, the military prefect ordered the martyrs to be thrown to wild beasts, but the beasts did not touch them. The saints were tied by the feet to chariots and dragged through the city, with many in the crowd throwing stones at them. Finally they were then beheaded with a sword.

They are commemorated on 10 March, in Russia 23 March.

== Quadratus of Herbipolis ==
Quadratus of Herbipolis was martyred around 257 at Herbipolis in Asia Minor (now modern-day Turkey) during the reign of Valerian. He had also been imprisoned at Nicomedia, Nicaea, and Apamea. He is commemorated on 7 May.

== Quadratus of Nicomedia ==
Quadratus of Nicomedia was a nobleman who was martyred at Nicomedia (now modern-day Turkey) during the reign of Emperor Valerian. His feast day is on 10 March.

== Quadratus of Utica and Companions ==
Quadratus of Utica was Bishop of Utica during the reign of Emperor Valerian, first banished in 257 and finally martyred along with his priests and laymen, whom he encouraged to confess Christ to pagans, on 21 August, 259. Their feast is celebrated on 21 August.

== Quadratus, Theodosius, Emmanuel and Companions ==
This Quadratus or Codratus was a martyred bishop in Anatolia (now modern-day Turkey). He was arrested and put to death with forty-two other martyrs, including Emmanuel and Theodosius, during the persecution of the Christians by Emperor Diocletian in 304. Their feast day is 26 March.
