= Simeon Popović =

Serbian Orthodox hieromonk and saint

Saint Symeon of Dajbabe Симеон Дајбабски
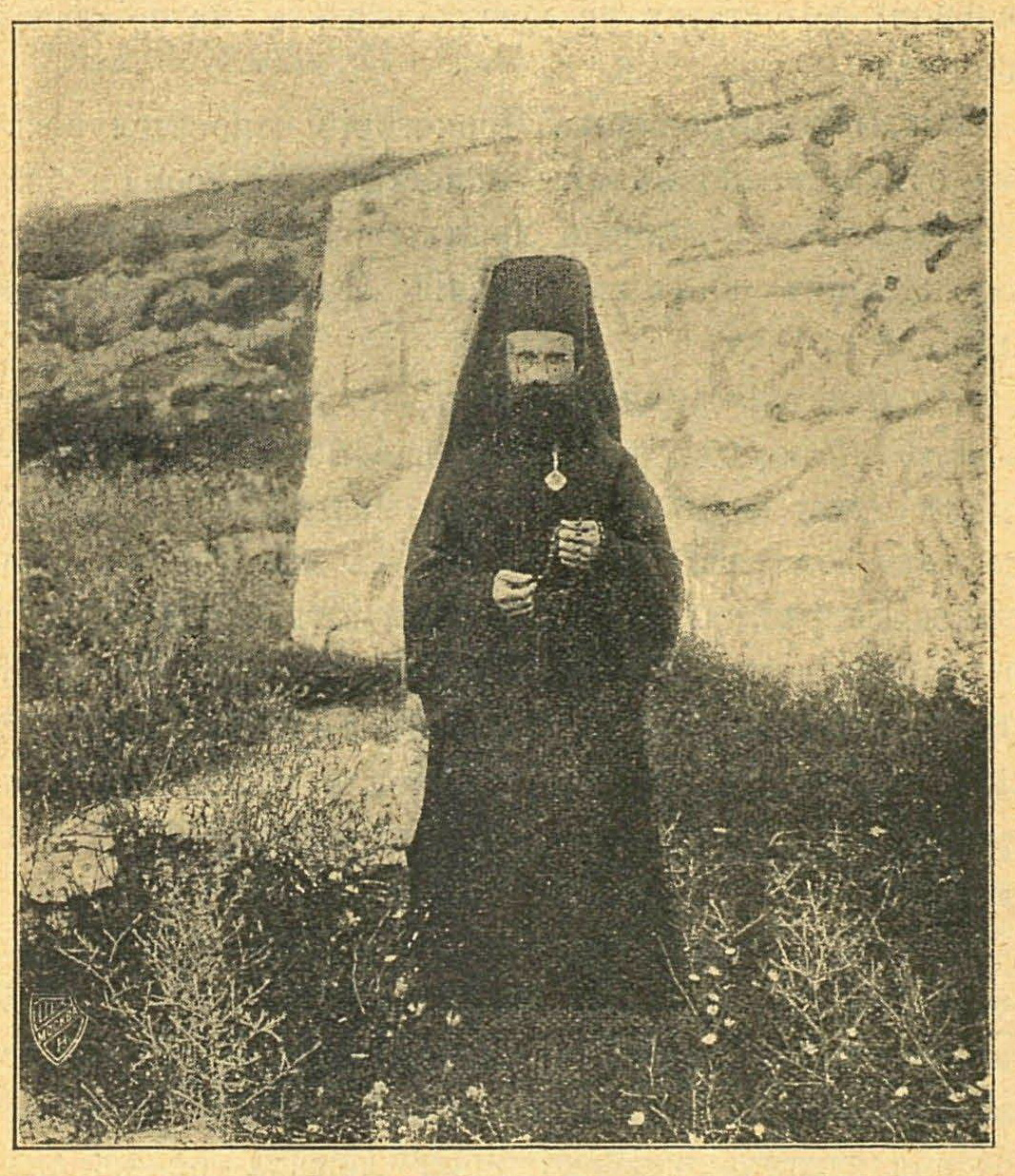
- Saint Symeon in 1898

Venerable father
- Born: 19 December 1854; Cetinje, Montenegro
- Died: 1 April 1941 (aged 86); Dajbabe Monastery, Yugoslavia
- Venerated in: Eastern Orthodox Church
- Canonized: 2 May 2010 by Serbian Orthodox Church
- Major shrine: Dajbabe Monastery
- Feast: 1 April (O.S. 19 March)
- Attributes: Vested as a hieromonk, holding a model of the Dajbabe Monastery

Simeon Popović (Serbian Cyrillic: Симеон Поповић; 19 December 1854 – 1 April 1941), sometimes romanized as Symeon Popovich, was a Serbian Orthodox hieromonk and the first abbot of the Dajbabe Monastery, which he founded.

== Biography ==
Symeon was born Savo Popović on 19 December 1854 in the Donji Kraj locality of Cetinje as part of the Montenegrin Popović clan. Soon after his birth, his parents divorced and his father died. His mother remarried in Skadar and left him to be raised by his father's parents. During childhood, his family would often refer to him as Little Savo. He was very close to his uncle Lazo, who was a priest. After finishing primary education in the Cetinje monastery, he participated in the Montenegrin-Turkish war. In 1879, Savo left for Kiev, where he studied at the Theological Seminary and, afterwards, at the Spiritual Academy. After graduation, he, wanting to familiarize himself with the life of the European West, went to France where he studied in Paris and then to Switzerland where he studied in Geneva, an experience that left him very disappointed, leading him to return to Russia in 1887 becoming a monk, then an archdeacon, and eventually a hieromonk, at the famous Kiev-Pechersk Lavra, taking the monastic name Symeon.

In 1888 he returned to Montenegro, serving at the Vranjina monastery for two years before moving to Ostrog, where he worked as a lecturer at the monastery's monastic school. He remained there for eight years until he met a young shepherd who claimed to have had a vision in which he saw a man in vestments who told him about a forgotten church in a cave in the village of Dajbabe which he should restore and turn into a monastery, Saint Symeon went there and built a church dedicated to the Dormition of the Mother of God in the cave, founding the Dajbabe monastery and becoming its first abbot. The shepherd joined him, becoming a monk. After a long period of asceticism, Symeon was believed to have gained the gifts of clairvoyance and discernament. In 1921 the Holy Assembly of Bishops of the Serbian Orthodox Church unanimously chose Symeon to become the bishop of the Eparchy of Zahumlje and Raška, but he refused.

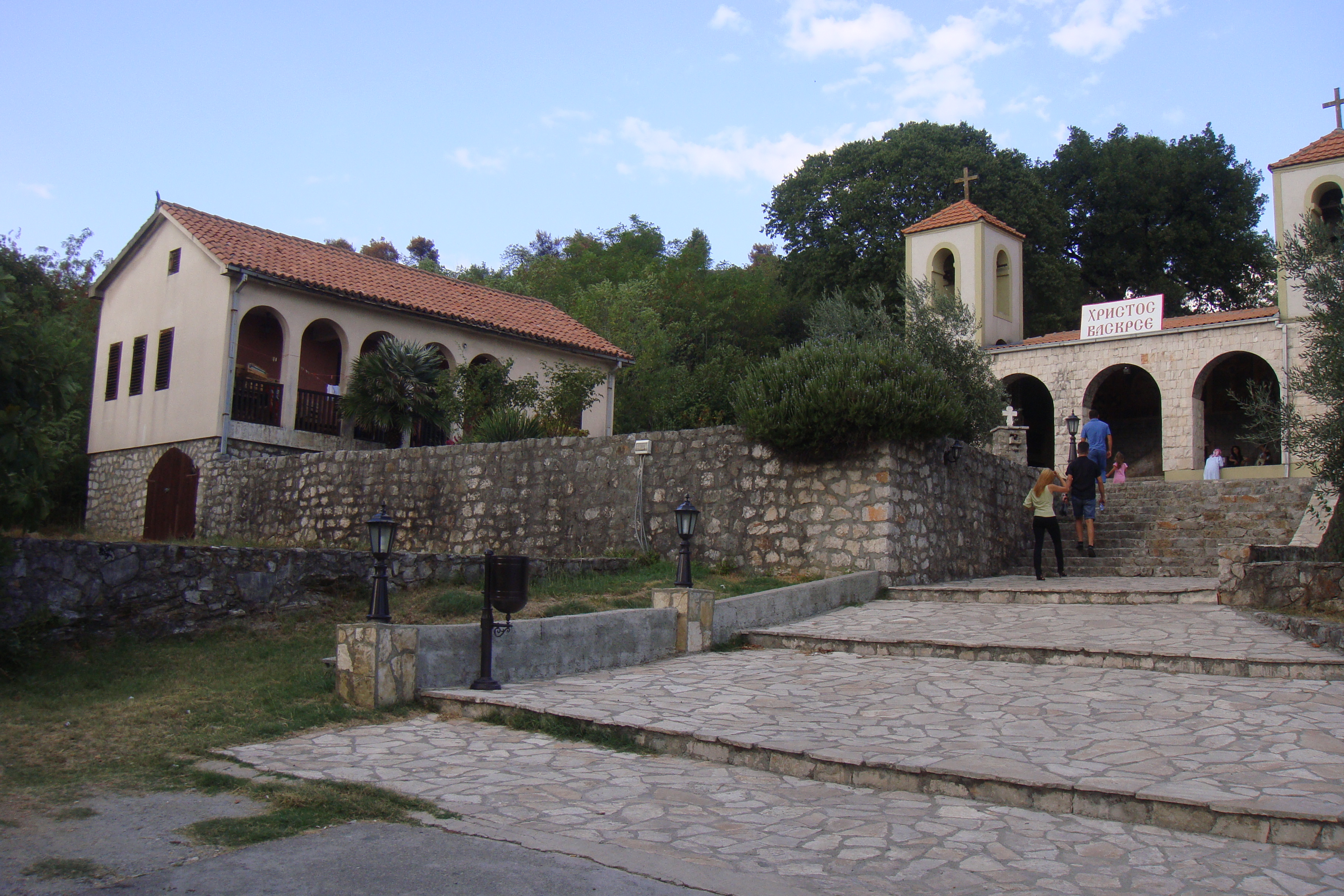
Dajbabe Monastery

According to tradition, Symeon foresaw World War II and the suffering it would bring to his people a long time before it occurred and thus prayed to God that he would not live to see it. He died on 1 April 1941, just six days before the Axis invasion of Yugoslavia.

== Veneration ==
Saint Symeon was considered saintly even during his lifetime. He was viewed highly by many of his contemporaries, such as Nikolaj Velimirović, who called him a ''holy monk'', and Justin Popović, who, after visiting him for the first time, wrote that he was ''dignified of the sweet grace of the great Serbian abba, Father Symeon". Just three years after his death, Metropolitan Joanikije, another future saint, delivered a speech calling him a saint. On 1 April 1996, his relics, which are said to exude a pleasant smell, were exhumed and placed in the monastery church. Since then, every year on his feast a large crowd gathers to venerate his relics which are also believed to heal people.

Symeon Popovich was officially canonized by the Serbian Orthodox Church on 2 May 2010 as Saint Symeon of Dajbabe.
