= Dajbabe Monastery =

Serbian Orthodox monastery in Podgorica, Montenegro

Coordinates: 42.403852°N 19.232456°E

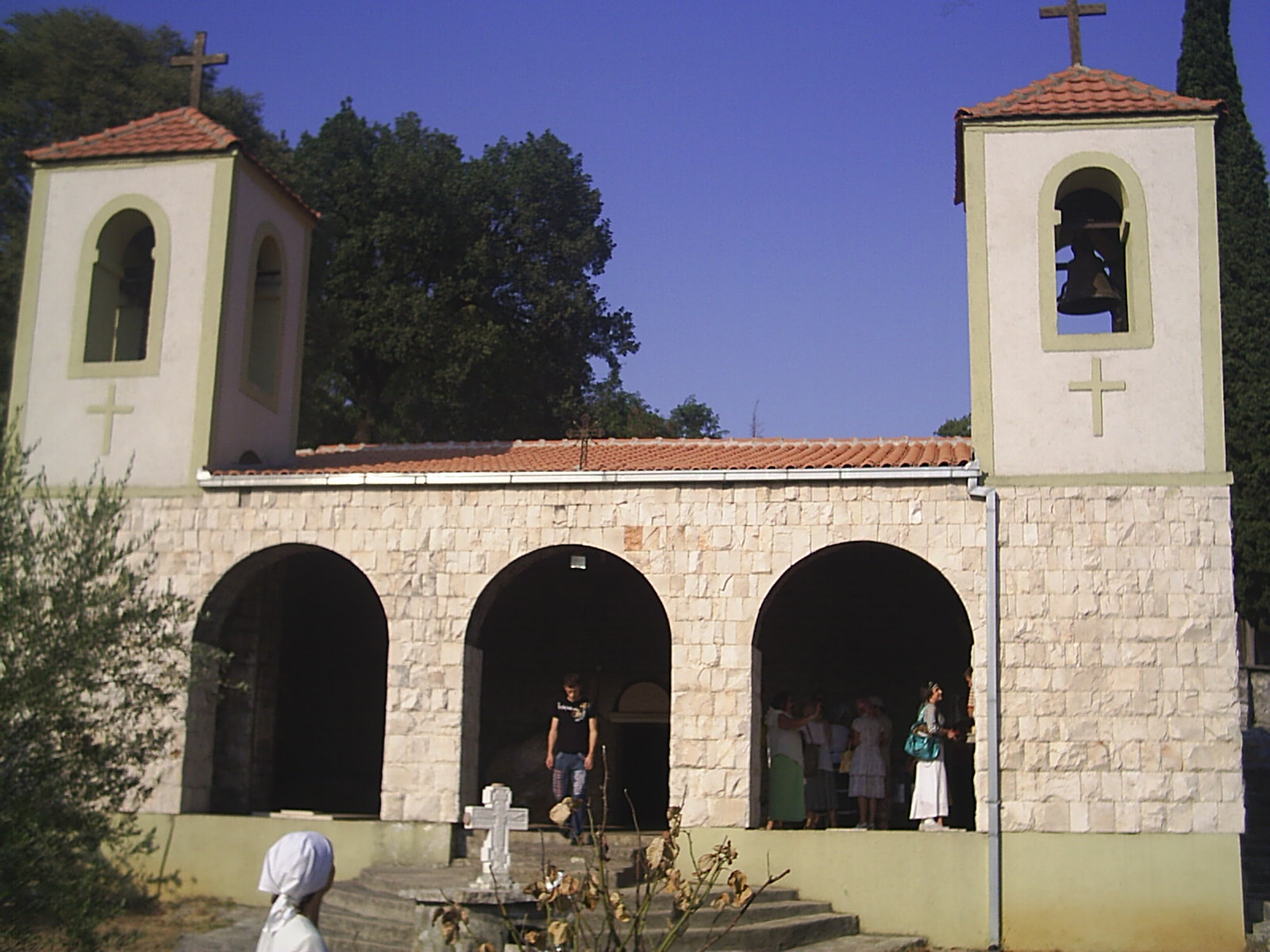
Entrance to the Monastery

The Dajbabe Monastery (Serbian: Манастир Дајбабе, romanized: Manastir Dajbabe) is a Serbian Orthodox monastery in Podgorica, Montenegro. It is located in a cave on Dajbabe Hill, which raises above Zeta valley. The Dajbabe Monastery was founded in 1897 and dedicated to the Assumption of the Theotokos. In the beginning, only the space of the cave was used as a sanctuary, with the plan to be expanded later with chapels. The visible part of the church is situated outside the cave, depicting a spacious entrance porch with two belfries. The Dajbabe Monastery also possesses a reliquary with the relics of St. Simeon Dajbabe.

== See also ==
- List of Serbian monasteries
