= June 20 (Eastern Orthodox liturgics) =

Day in the Eastern Orthodox liturgical calendar

Eastern Orthodox liturgical calendar
June 19	June 20	June 21
June 20 O.S. ≍ July 3 N.S. June 20 N.S ≍ June 7 O.S.

An Eastern Orthodox cross

June 20 in Eastern Orthodox liturgical calendars is a feast day and a day of commemoration of saints and martyrs. Although some Orthodox churches use the Revised Julian Calendar and others use the traditional Julian calendar, the fixed commemorations for their respective June 20 are broadly the same, no matter which calendar is used. (Note: Despite the dates being the same, the days to which they refer typically differ by 13 days. The notation Old Style or O.S. is sometimes used to indicate a date in the traditional Julian Calendar (the "Old Calendar"). The notation New Style or N.S. indicates a date in the Revised Julian calendar (the "New Calendar").)

== Saints ==
- Martyrs Paul, Cyriacus, Paula, Felicilana, Thomas, Felix, Martyrius, Vitaly, Crispinus, and Emilius, in Tomis, Moesia (290) (Note: "At Tomis, in Pontus, the holy martyrs Paul and Cyriacus.")
- Hieromartyrs Aristocleus, priest, the deacon Demetrian, and the reader Athanasius, at Salamis on Cyprus (c. 306) (see also: June 23)
- Hieromartyr Methodius of Olympus in Lycia, Bishop of Patara (312)
- Blessed Studius, founder of the Studion Monastery (5th century)
- Venerable Nahum of Ochrid, Enlightener of the Bulgarians (910)
- The Venerable Two Ascetic Hermits, reposed in peace in the desert.

== Pre-Schism Western saints ==
- Saint Novatus, son of Pudens, senator of Rome, and brother of Sts Praxedes and Pudentiana (c. 151) (Note: "At Rome, the demise of St. Novatus, son of the blessed senator Pudens, and brother of the saintly priest Timothy, and of the holy virgins of Christ Pudentiana and Praxedes, who were instructed in the faith by the Apostles. Their house was converted into a church, and bore the title of Pastor.")
- Saint Alban, Protomartyr of Britain (c. 303) (Note: Venerated as the Protomartyr of Britain. He was a citizen of Verulam, now in England, converted by a persecuted priest whom he had sheltered in his house. He was executed on Holmhurst Hill and on this site was built the monastery of St Alban's, by which name Verulam has since been known.) (see also: June 22 )
- Saint Leucius the Confessor, Bishop of Brindisi (Brentisiopolis) (5th century)
- Hieromartyr Silverius, Pope of Rome (537) (Note: "THE birthday of St. Silverius, pope and martyr. For refusing to reinstate the heretical bishop Anthimus, deposed by his predecessor Agapitus, he was banished to the isle of Pontia, by Belisarius, at the instigation of the wicked empress Theodora, and, consumed by many tribulations for the Catholic faith, he expired.")
- Saint Govan (Goven, Cofen), hermit who lived in a fissure on the side of coastal cliff near Bosherston, in the Pembrokeshire Coast National Park, Wales (586) (Note: A hermit who lived halfway down a cliff at St Govan's Head in Dyfed in Wales where his stone hut can still be seen. He is probably buried under the altar in the hut, which later became a small chapel. Govan was probably a disciple of St Ailbe.)
- Saint Florentina (Florence), Abbess, of Spain (c. 636) (Note: "At Seville, in Spain, the holy virgin Florentina, sister of the holy bishops Leander and Isidore.") (Note: Born in Carthagena in Spain, she was the only sister of Sts Leander, Fulgentius and Isidore. Losing her parents at an early age, she was placed under the guardianship of St Leander. She went to a convent where she later became abbess.)
- Saint Goban (Gobain), an Irish Benedictine monk and spiritual student of Saint Fursey at Burgh Castle, Norfolk, England (670) (Note: Born in Ireland and a disciple of St Fursey, he became a monk with him at Burgh Castle in Suffolk. He followed his abbot to France and they lived as hermits in the forest near the Oise. He was murdered by barbarians at the place now called Saint Gobain.)
- Saint Bain (Bainus, Bagnus), a monk at Fontenelle in France, he became Bishop of Thérouanne (c. 710) (Note: After twelve years he returned to Fontenelle and later became abbot. He is the main patron-saint of Calais.)
- Saint Helen (Heliada), Abbess of the convent of Oehren in Trier in Germany (c. 750)
- Saint Adalbert of Magdeburg, Abbot of Weissenburg, and in 968 the first Archbishop of Magdeburg, with jurisdiction over the western Slavs or Sorbs (981) (Note: A monk at St Maximin in Trier in Germany, he went to preach to the pagans. In 961 all his companions were killed by them and he only escaped with difficulty. He then became Abbot of Weissenburg and in 968 the first Archbishop of Magdeburg with jurisdiction over the western Slavs or Sorbs.)

== Post-Schism Orthodox saints ==
- Saint Minas, Bishop of Polotsk (1116)
- Right-believing Prince Gleb Andreyevich of Vladimir (1175) (Note: See: (in Russian) Глеб Владимирский. Википедии. (Russian Wikipedia).)
- Venerable Callistus I, Patriarch of Constantinople (1363)
- Venerable Nicholas Kabasilas, Byzantine mystic and theological writer, spiritual child of St. Gregory Sinaitis (1392 or 1397) (Note: He was once thought to have succeeded his uncle Neilos Kabasilas as archbishop of Thessalonica; however contemporary records of that see do not show Nicholas as serving in the capacity of archbishop. It is more likely that he served as a priest at the Mangana Monastery at Constantinople.)
- Venerable new monk-martyr Zacharias of Arta, Greece (1782)

=== New martyrs and confessors ===
- New Hieromartyr Stanislav Nasadil, victim of the Nazi Croatia concentration camp at Gospić (1941) (Note: The local canonization of the hieromartyr will take place at the Cathedral of the Dormition and St. Jon the Merciful in Košice, Slovakia on June 9, 2019. The service will be led by His Beatitude Metropolitan Rostislav, the primate of the Orthodox Church of the Czech Lands and Slovakia. He was canonized by the Serbian Church in 1961. The Church in Czechoslovakia was a canonical part of the Serbian Orthodox Church at the time of St. Stanislav’s martyrdom.)

== Other commemorations ==
- Translation of the relics (1st-2nd century) of Martyrs Inna, Pinna, and Rimma, Scythian disciples of Apostle Andrew, to Alushta in Crimea (1st-2nd century)(see also: January 20 )
- Translation of the relics and garments (c. 960) of Apostles Luke, Andrew, and Thomas, Prophet Elisha, and Martyr Lazarus to the Church of the Holy Apostles in Constantinople.
- Uncovering of the relics (1001) of Edward the Martyr, King of England (978) (Note: "This king was barbarously murdered by his mother-in-law at Corfe Castle, as already related (March 18th, p. 324-6); and was buried at Wareham, without any solemnity. But after three years, his body was translated on June 20th, by Elthere, duke of the Mercians, to Shaftesbury, and was there interred with great pomp.") (Note: Note the following dates: The first translation of the holy relics, to the church of the Most Holy Mother of God in Wareham, took place on February 13, 980.; On February 13, 981 a great procession of clergy and laity translated the relics to Shaftesbury Abbey, arriving there seven days later, on February 20.; The elevation (uncovering) of the relics of St. Edward took place on June 20, 1001.; St. Edward was officially glorified by an act of the All-English Council of 1008, presided over by St. Alphege, archbishop of Canterbury (who was martyred by the Danes in 1012). King Ethelred ordered that the saint's three feast days (March 18, February 13 and June 20) should be celebrated throughout England.) (Note: "In 980 his body was moved to Shaftesbury Abbey, the relics were enshrined in 1001, and he was officially canonised in 1008. St Edward's shrine survived until the Dissolution of the Monasteries, when it was stripped of its wealth. However, St Edward's remains had previously been removed and hidden in the Church. In 1931 a crude casket was unearthed during an archaeological investigation of the site. The remains were studied and pronounced consistent with the injuries received by St Edward. The Director of the Excavations, John Wilson-Claridge (1905-1993), whose family then owned the site, began years of painstaking negotiations with all the major churches in order to fins a suitable resting place for the relics...the Russian Orthodox Church in Exile...entered into detailed negotiations with Mr Wilson-Claridge in the late 1970s. At about the same time the Orthodox Church purchased the site now owned by the St Edward Brotherhood, with the intention of using the larger of the two mortuary chapels for the reception of St Edward's bones. The formal ceremony of enshrinement took place on 15/16 September 1984. Thus for the first time in nearly 450 years the remains of St Edward (arguably England's least important king) have a fitting resting place within a Church whose doctrine is closest to that which he knew in his lifetime. 2001 marked the one thousandth anniversary of the glorification of St Edward. In 1001, it was decided to enshrine his relics at Shaftesbury Abbey in a costly and elaborate shrine...A special service was held in the St Edward the Martyr Church on 31 March 2001 to celebrate this event. The Hierarchical Liturgy was led by Archbishop Mark who has pastoral oversight of the parishes of the Russian Orthodox Church Abroad in the British Isles.") (see also: March 18 - feast, and February 13 - translation)
- Translation of the relics of St. Gurias, Archbishop of Kazan (1630) (Note: See: (in Russian) Гурий (Руготин). Википедии. (Russian Wikipedia).)
- Finding of the relics (1959) of New Hieromartyr Raphael, Hieromonk, of Mytilene (1463) (see also: April 9 )
- Icon of the Most Holy Theotokos "Odigitria" ("Directress"), at the Xenophontos monastery on Mt Athos.
- Icon of the Most Holy Theotokos "Modensk-Kosninsk".

== Icon gallery ==
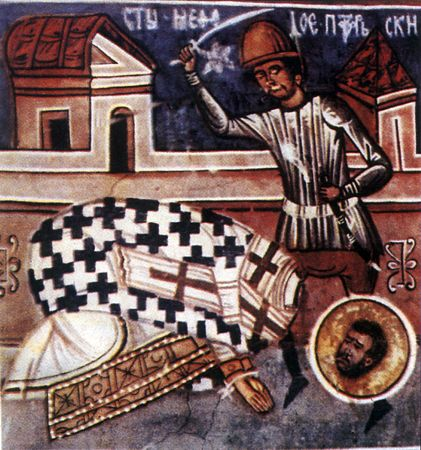
Hieromartyr Methodius of Olympus in Lycia, Bishop of Patara.

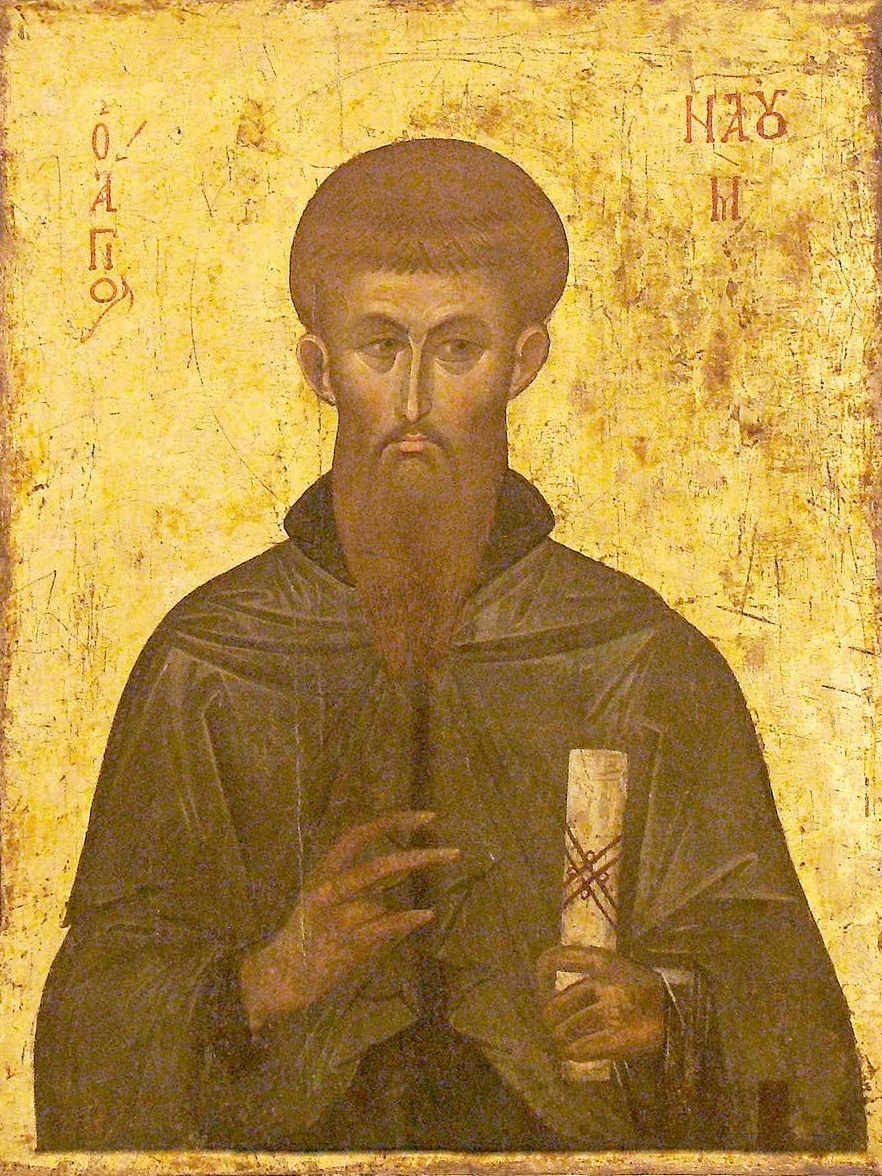
Venerable Nahum of Ochrid, Enlightener of the Bulgarians.

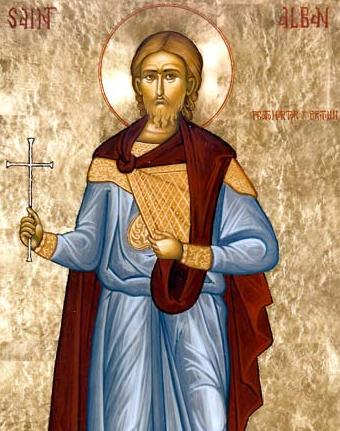
St. Alban, Protomartyr of Britain.

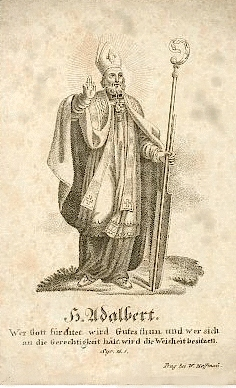
St. Adalbert of Magdeburg.

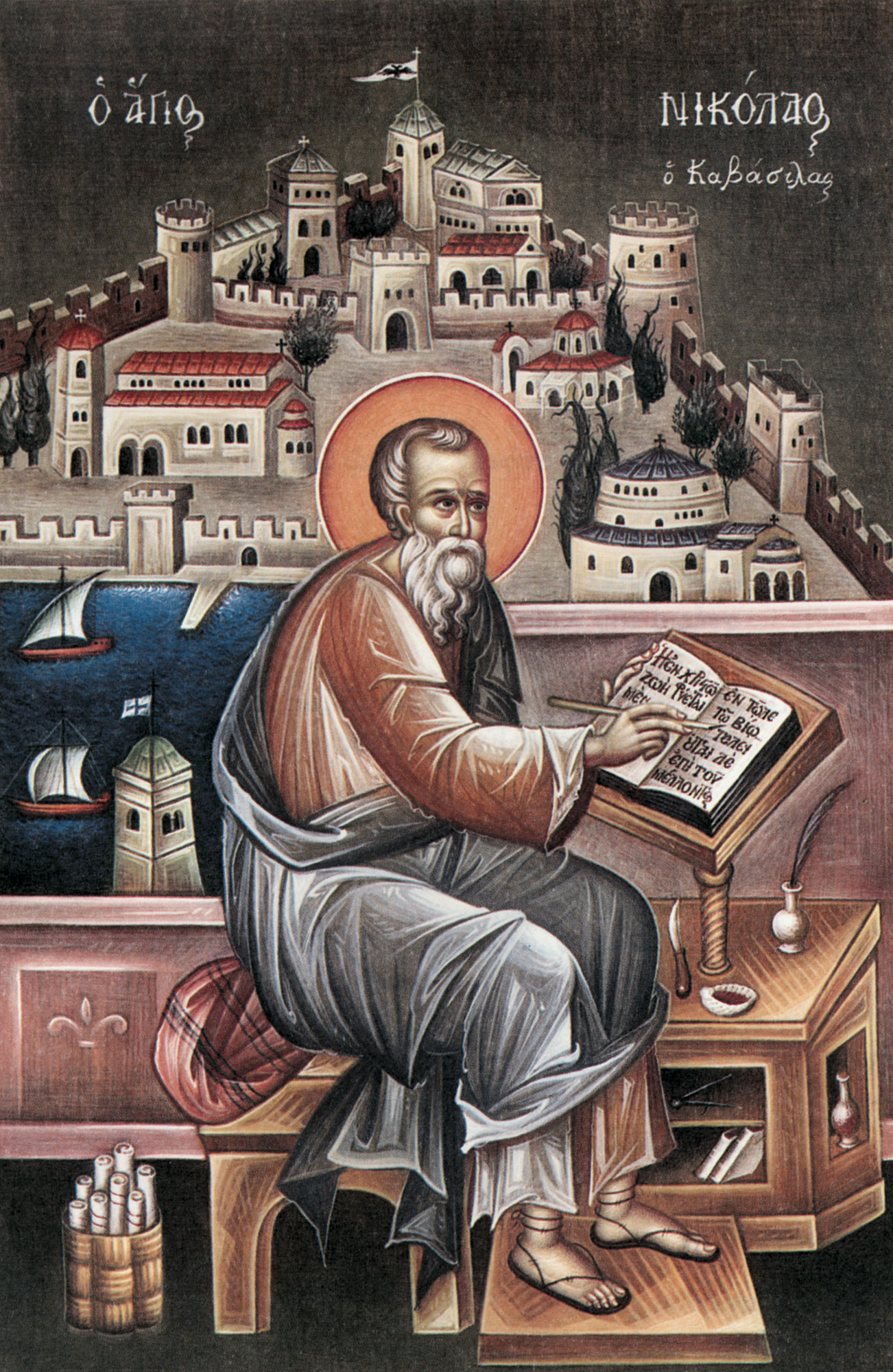
Nicholas Kabasilas.

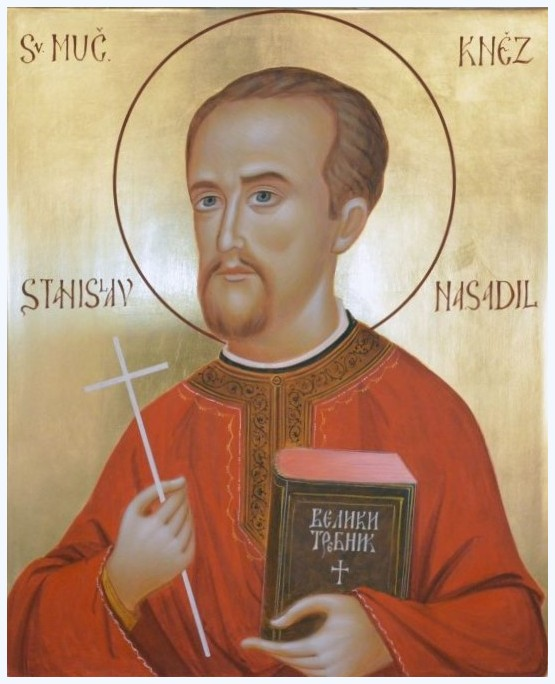
New Hieromartyr Stanislav Nasadil.

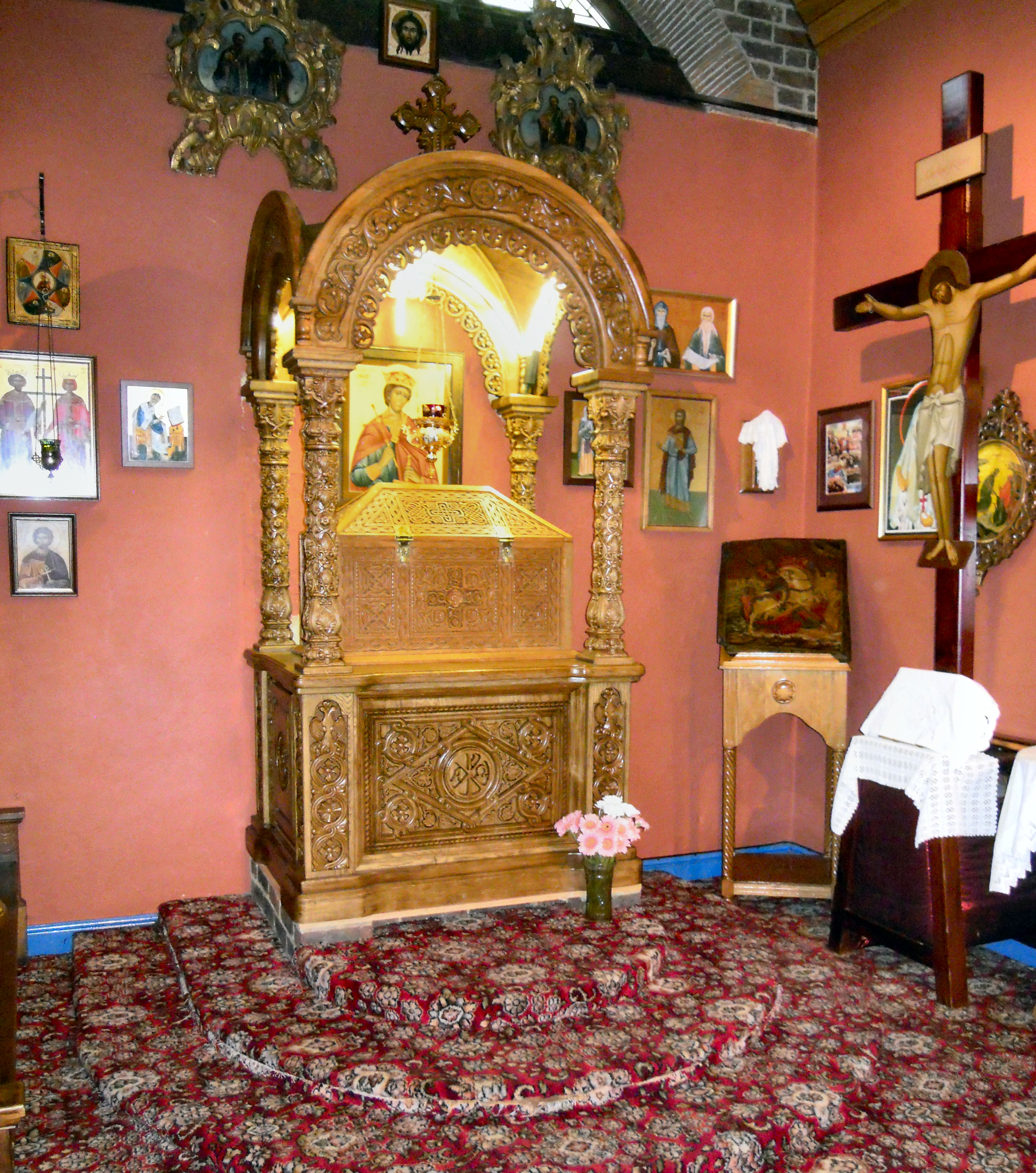
The Shrine of St Edward in the Church of St. Edward the Martyr, Brookwood (2018).

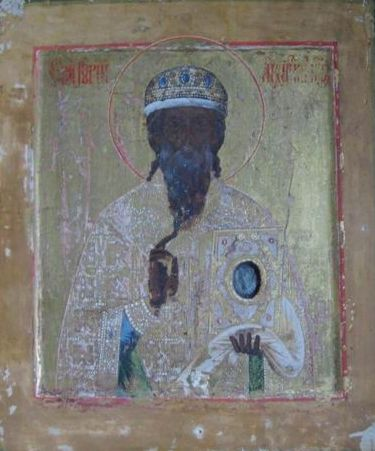
St. Gurias, Archbishop of Kazan.

== Sources ==
- June 20/July 3. Orthodox Calendar (PRAVOSLAVIE.RU).
- July 3 / June 20. HOLY TRINITY RUSSIAN ORTHODOX CHURCH (A parish of the Patriarchate of Moscow).
- June 20. OCA - The Lives of the Saints.
- The Autonomous Orthodox Metropolia of Western Europe and the Americas (ROCOR). St. Hilarion Calendar of Saints for the year of our Lord 2004. St. Hilarion Press (Austin, TX). p. 45.
- The Twentieth Day of the Month of June. Orthodoxy in China.
- June 20. Latin Saints of the Orthodox Patriarchate of Rome.
- The Roman Martyrology. Transl. by the Archbishop of Baltimore. Last Edition, According to the Copy Printed at Rome in 1914. Revised Edition, with the Imprimatur of His Eminence Cardinal Gibbons. Baltimore: John Murphy Company, 1916. pp. 179–180.
- Rev. Richard Stanton. A Menology of England and Wales, or, Brief Memorials of the Ancient British and English Saints Arranged According to the Calendar, Together with the Martyrs of the 16th and 17th Centuries. London: Burns & Oates, 1892. pp. 276–278.

Greek Sources

- Great Synaxaristes: (in Greek) 20 ΙΟΥΝΙΟΥ. ΜΕΓΑΣ ΣΥΝΑΞΑΡΙΣΤΗΣ.
- (in Greek) Συναξαριστής. 20 Ιουνίου. ECCLESIA.GR. (H ΕΚΚΛΗΣΙΑ ΤΗΣ ΕΛΛΑΔΟΣ).
- (in Greek) 20 Ιουνίου. Αποστολική Διακονία της Εκκλησίας της Ελλάδος (Apostoliki Diakonia of the Church of Greece).
- (in Greek) 20/06/2018. Ορθόδοξος Συναξαριστής.

Russian Sources

- (in Russian) 3 июля (20 июня). Православная Энциклопедия под редакцией Патриарха Московского и всея Руси Кирилла (электронная версия). (Orthodox Encyclopedia - Pravenc.ru).
- (in Russian) 20 июня по старому стилю / 3 июля по новому стилю. Русская Православная Церковь - Православный церковный календарь на 2017 год.
- (in Russian) 20 июня (ст.ст.) 3 июля 2014 (нов. ст.). Русская Православная Церковь Отдел внешних церковных связей. (DECR).
