= Stanislav Nasadil =

Serbian Orthodox priest and saint (1907–1941)

Saint Stanislav Nasadil
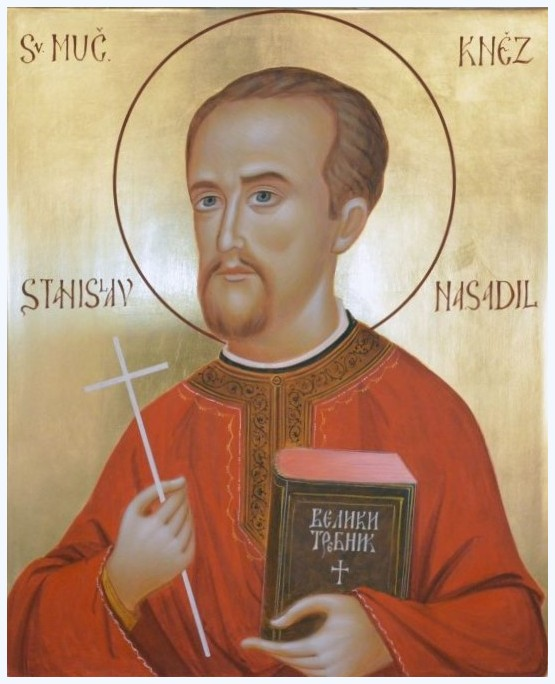
- Icon of Saint Stanislav

New Hieromartyr
- Born: 20 October 1907; Lostice, Austrian Empire
- Died: 28 June 1941 (aged 33); Jasenovac, Independent State of Croatia
- Venerated in: Eastern Orthodox Church
- Canonized: 1961 and 9 June 2019 by Serbian Orthodox Church and Orthodox Church of the Czech Lands and Slovakia respectively
- Feast: 20 June (Czech Orthodox); 17 July (Serbian Orthodox)
- Attributes: holding a martyr's cross and breviary, red vestments

Stanislav Nasadil (Czech: Svatý Stanislav Nasadil, Slovak: Svätý Stanislav Nasadil, Serbian: Свети Станислав Насадил, romanized: Sveti Stanislav Nasadil; 20 October 1907 – 28 June 1941) was a Czech priest of the Serbian Orthodox Church and saint who was martyred in World War II.

== Life ==
Born on 20 October 1907 in Loštice, Austrian Empire, he was the son of Fr. František Nasadil and his mother Františka. He had four brothers. He first attended a national school and then a burgher school. In 1921 and 1922, the family renounced the Roman Catholic faith, and in 1924 they joined the newly emerging Orthodox Church under the leadership of the Bishop Gorazd Pavlík (who, like Nasadil, would later be martyred in the Second World War.)

As a young man, he decided on a Christian vocation. Together with 14 students, he was sent to a seminary of the Serbian Orthodox Church in 1923. He first studied in the seminar of St. Jan Theologian in Macedonian Bitole and in 1928 he finished his studies with a theological school-leaving examination in the seminary of St. Sava. Then he returned home and started working in the service of the church and also as a translator in Baťa's shoe factories in Zlín.

On 6 July 1931, he married Leopoldina b. Pestlová (Desanka) and the same year their son Dalibor called Stanko was born.

Between 1932 and 1933 he left for the Kingdom of Yugoslavia. On 11 March 1933 he was ordained a deacon by the Diocese of Bac Irinej and a day later as a priest. After his ordination, he began working as an auxiliary priest in the parish of Stara Moravica belonging to the Diocese of Upper Karlovac. He then became a parish priest in Croatian Lička Jesenica in the church of St. the prophet Elijah.

In April 1941, Croatian and Bosnian territories were occupied by the fascist Independent State of Croatia which was established there, which was a puppet state of the Third Reich. This Ustasha state liquidated religious minorities (Orthodox Serbs, Roma, and Jews). On 23 May 1941 the Ustashas invaded the residence of the eparchial bishop Sava Trlajić in the village of Plaški. The bishop and the clergy present, including Fr. Nasadil, were identified as undesirable and were called to leave the country under threat of death. Those present decided to stay with their believers.

On 17 June 1941 Bishop Sava, Fr. Nasadil and other clergy and laity were arrested. Fr. Nasadil refused to defend Czechoslovak citizenship and dismiss his family. At the train station, he managed to write the name of the Gospić concentration camp on a piece of paper and threw it off the train. This way the family learned where they were transporting him. He was later transferred with Bishop Sava and others to the Jadovno concentration camp. Here the prisoners were tortured and eventually killed. Stanislav Nasadil died after being tortured on 28 June 1941, and his body was thrown into the Šaran pit, located about 1 km from the camp.

On 9 June 2019 Stanislav Nasadil was canonized by the Orthodox Church of the Czech Lands and Slovakia. The service took place in Cathedral of Sts. Cyril and Methodius in Michalovce.
