= Peja (disambiguation) =

Peja is a city and municipality located in the District of Peja of Kosovo.

Peja may also refer to:

- District of Peja, Kosovo
- KB Peja, a Kosovan basketball team
- Peja (priest), (fl. 1515–23), n Eastern Orthodox priest
- Peja (rapper) or Ryszard Andrzejewski (born 1976), Polish rapper

== People with the given name ==
- Peja Lindholm (born 1970), Swedish curler
- Peja Stojaković (born 1977), Serbian basketball player
