= Panagia Katakekrymeni-Portokalousa =

Former Eastern Orthodox monastery, now church, in Argos, Peloponnese, Greece

Panagia-Katakekrymeni-Portokalousa
- Monastery of the Entry of the Most Holy Theotokos into the Temple
- Sacred Church of the Eisodia of the Theotokos-Panagia Portokalousa, Argos
- Παναγία Κατακεκρυμμένη – Πορτοκαλούσα
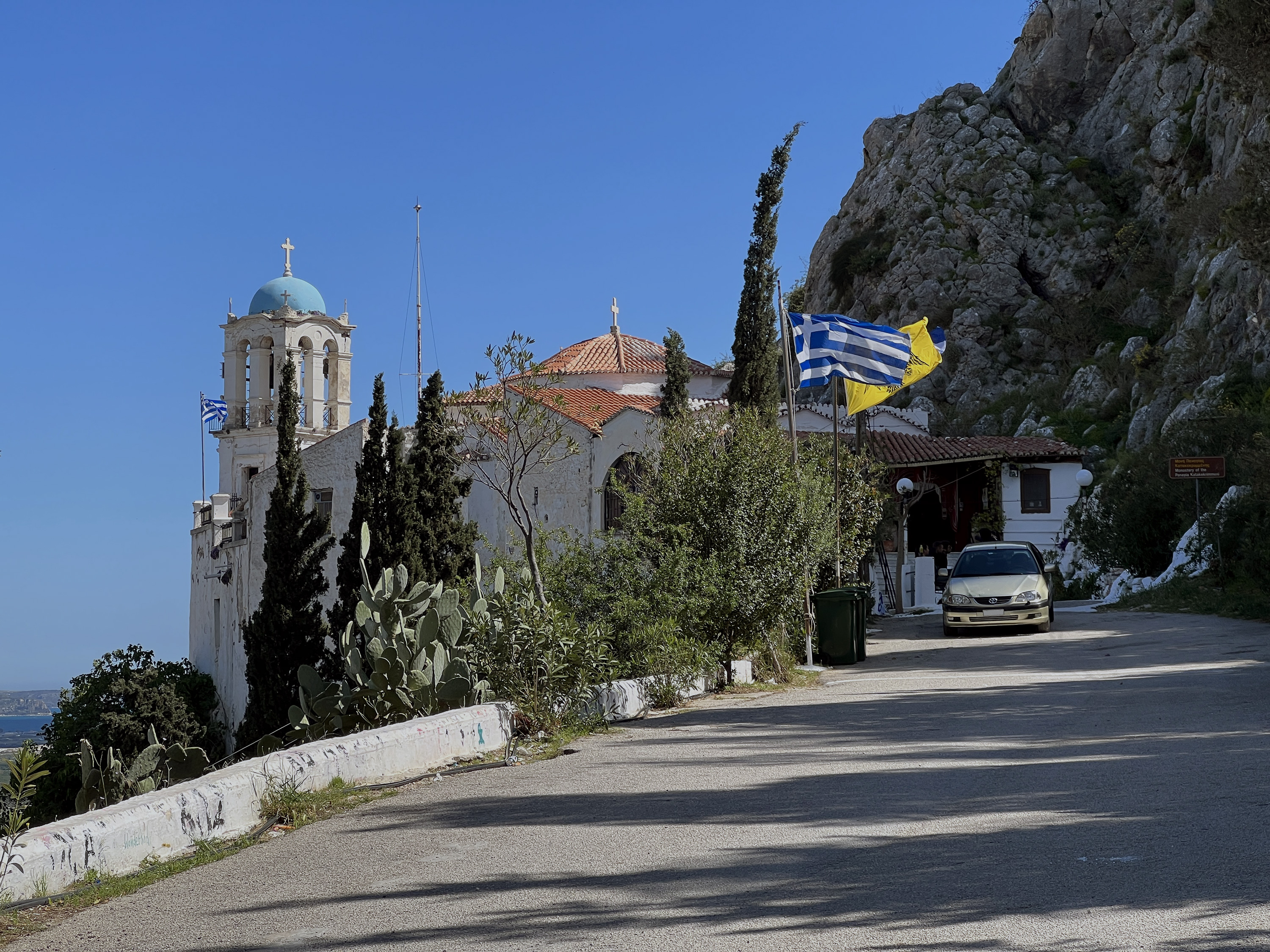
- The monastery, now church, in 2023
- Panagia-Katakekrymeni-Portokalousa
- Location: Argos, Mount Larissa, Peloponnese
- Country: Greece
- Language: Greek
- Denomination: Greek Orthodox Church

History
- Status: Monastery (c. 10th – c. 18th century); Nunnery (18th century–1856); Monastery (1856–1911); Church (since c. 1911– )
- Dedication: John the Baptist (c. 1911)
- Earlier dedication: Presentation of Mary
- Events: November 21: Presentation; March 25: Annunciation

Architecture
- Functional status: Active (as a church)
- Architectural type: Monastery
- Style: Byzantine
- Completed: c. 10th century (as a monastery); 18th century (as a nunnery); 1856 (monastery); 1911 (church)

Administration
- Metropolis: Argolis

The Panagia-Katakekrymeni-Portokalousa (Greek: Παναγία Κατακεκρυμμένη – Πορτοκαλούσα Άργους, lit. 'Our Hidden Lady the Orange-Bearer of Argos') is a former Greek Orthodox monastery and now church, located in Argos on the slopes of Mount Larissa, in the Peloponnese region of Greece.

Its official title is the Monastery of the Entry of the Most Holy Theotokos into the Temple, and it derives its popular name from the secreting of an ancient icon of Panagia (Virgin Mary) in a cave below the church, hidden by the branches of orange trees. The church is also known as the Sacred Church of the Eisodia of the Theotokos-Panagia Portokalousa, Argos. At various times since the 10th century, the structure has been used as a monastery, nunnery, and as a church.

== History ==
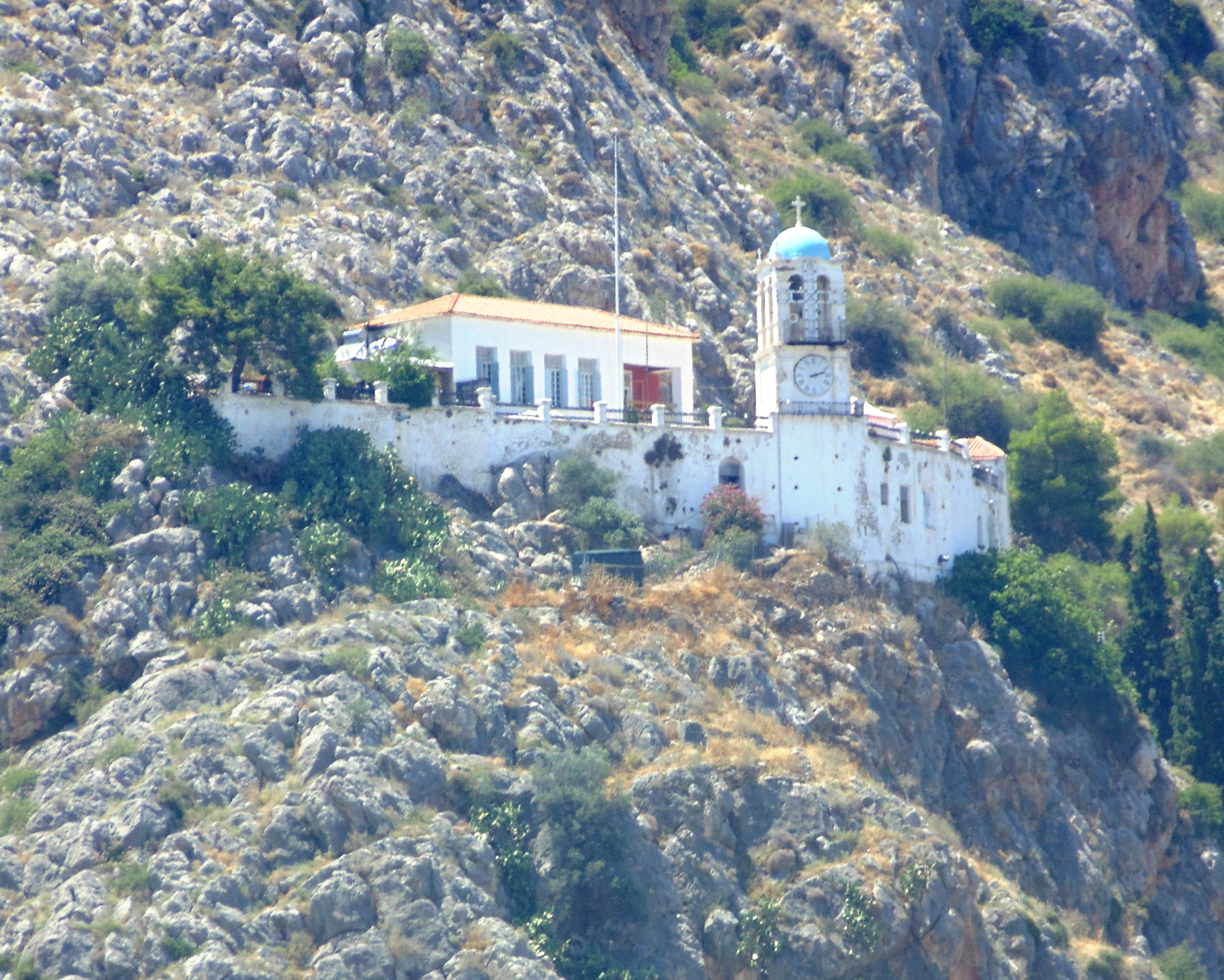
An aerial view of the church, in 2017

The exact date of the establishment of the monastery is unclear. Some reports date its early establishment from the tenth century. A series of interventions during the 18th century make its establishment as a Greek Orthodox nunnery clear. During the Ottoman occupation of Greece, it became the site of a secret Greek school. And during the Greek War of Independence, it was used as the first national mint of Greece to strike coinage for the Greek government. It became a male monastery in 1856, and the surrounding land became a glebe for the monks.

From 1911 to 1976, under the administrations of Hieromonks Joseph and Makarios Drosos, the chapel was re-dedicated in honor of Saint John the Baptist, (called "The Forerunner" in Greek), because Saint Demetrius the Neomartyr had become a monk at a monastery dedicated to Saint John on the island of Chios before returning to Tripoli. While the monastery buildings are still intact, local monks now reside at other monasteries in the area and act as caretakers for the site.

== Relics ==
The ancient icon of Panagia was hidden due to concerns for its safety during a Turkish military action in 1803 by Ottoman forces based in Tripoli. According to tradition, when the monks went to retrieve the icon, a second traditional icon thought lost had miraculously appeared next to the one that was hidden. These "lost" or "hidden" icons are now "found," and on display in the chapel. The Marian icons are in the glykophiloussa ("sweetly-kissing") style, which depict Mary kissing the baby Jesus. On feast days, they are carried in procession decorated with local oranges.

The events in Tripoli were connected to the history of Saint Demetrius the Neomartyr of the Peloponnese, a Greek Orthodox Christian boy born in Floka and raised in Ligouditsa, both in Arcadia, near Tripoli. He converted to Islam as a boy, but later repented and became an Orthodox monk. Demetrius decided that to expiate his sins, he must perform a great penance by returning to Tripoli to confess publicly that he was recanting his conversion to Islam. His abbot tried to dissuade him, to no avail, and Demetrius returned to Tripoli and publicly confessed his re-conversion to Christianity. Because of this, he was tried by a Turkish judge for apostasy from Islam and convicted and sentenced to die in 1803, despite the attempted intercession of a Turkish friend, who tried to cover up for him. Thus, in addition to celebrating the icons of the Panagia, the church at the former monastery is also used for an annual commemoration of Demetrius.

== Notable artworks ==
Notable works include:

- Bible published in Venice in 1776
- Painting of the Entry of Theotokos into the Temple, dated 1705, also known as the Presentation of the Blessed Virgin Mary
- Painting of Panagia Glykofilousa

== See also ==
- Church of Greece
- List of Eastern Orthodox church buildings in Greece
- List of Greek Orthodox monasteries in Greece
