= Michael of Alexandria =

Michael of Alexandria may refer to:

- Pope Michael I of Alexandria, ruled in 743–767
- Pope Michael II of Alexandria, ruled in 849–851
- Patriarch Michael I of Alexandria, Greek Patriarch of Alexandria in 860–870
- Patriarch Michael II of Alexandria, Greek Patriarch of Alexandria in 870–903
- Michael of Alexandria (martyr) (died 1311×1325)
