= March 18 (Eastern Orthodox liturgics) =

Day in the Eastern Orthodox liturgical calendar

Eastern Orthodox liturgical calendar
March 17	March 18	March 19
March 18 O.S. ≍ March 31 N.S. March 18 N.S ≍ March 5 O.S.

An Eastern Orthodox cross

March 18 in Eastern Orthodox liturgical calendars is a feast day and a day of commemoration of saints and martyrs. Although some Orthodox churches use the Revised Julian Calendar and others use the traditional Julian calendar, the fixed commemorations for their respective March 18 are broadly the same, no matter which calendar is used. (Note: Despite the dates being the same, the days to which they refer typically differ by 13 days. The notation Old Style or O.S. is sometimes used to indicate a date in the traditional Julian Calendar (the "Old Calendar"). The notation New Style or N.S. indicates a date in the Revised Julian calendar (the "New Calendar").)

== Saints ==
- The 10,000 Martyrs of Nicomedia (Myriads of Holy Martyrs), by the sword. (Note: There are references to "ten thousand holy martyrs" in hagiography given on various dates, including March 18th, June 1st, and June 22nd, as follows: The Roman Martyrology has a matching entry to the Synaxarion for March 18th as follows: "At Nicomedia, ten thousand holy martyrs, who were put to the sword for the confession of Christ."; There is an additionional entry in the Great Synaxaristes for June 1st: "The Holy Ten Thousand Martyrs in Antiochia, under the Roman Emperor Decius".; There is another entry in the Roman Martyrology mentioning "ten thousand holy martyrs" occurring on June 22: "On Mt. Ararat, the martyrdom of ten thousand holy martyrs, who were crucified.")
- Martyrs Trophimus and Eucarpion, soldiers, at Nicomedia (300)
- Saint Cyril of Jerusalem, Archbishop of Jerusalem (386) (Note: "AT Jerusalem, St. Cyril, bishop and doctor, who suffered many injuries from the Arians for the faith. Often exiled from his church, he at length rested in peace with a great reputation for sanctity. A magnificent testimony of the purity of his faith is given by a general Council, in a letter to Pope Damasus.")
- Venerable Ananias the Wonderworker (Aninas of the Euphrates), Hieromonk. (Note: "Aninus was born in Chalcedon. He was of short stature as was Zacchaeus of old but great in spirit and faith. He withdrew from the world in his fifteenth year and settled in a hut near the Euphrates river where he prayed to God and atoned for his sins, at first with his teacher Mayum and, after his death, alone. Through the power of his prayers, he replenished a dry well with water, healed the sick of various maladies and tamed wild beasts. A trained lion accompanied him and was at his service at all times. He discerned the future. When Pionius, a stylite, was attacked and badly beaten by robbers some distance away from Aninus, Pionius decided to descend from the pillar and proceed to complain to the judges. St. Aninus "discerned the soul" of this stylite and his intention. He sent a letter to Pionius, by his lion, counseling him to abandon his intention, to forgive his assailants and to continue in his asceticism. His charity was inexpressible. The Bishop of Neo-Caesarea (Patricios) presented him with a donkey in order to ease the burden of carrying water from the river, but he gave the donkey to a needy man who had complained to him about his poverty. The bishop presented him with another donkey and he gave that one away. Finally, the bishop gave him a third donkey, not only to serve as a water-carrier but one that Aninus was to care for and to return. Before his death Aninus saw Moses, Aaron and Or [Egyptian Ascetic, or Hur: Ex. 24:14] approaching him, and they called out to him, "Aninus, the Lord is calling you, arise and come with us." He revealed this to his disciples and gave up his soul to the Lord, Whom he faithfully served. He was one-hundred ten years old when his earthly life was ended.") (see also: March 16)
- Saint Daniel, monk of Egypt (6th century)

== Pre-Schism Western saints ==
- Saints Narcissus and Felix, a Bishop and his Deacon honoured as martyrs in the city of Girona in Catalonia, Spain (c. 307) (Note: "At Augsburg, St. Narcissus, bishop, who was the first to preach the Gospel in the Tyrol. Afterwards, setting out for Spain, he converted many to the faith of Christ at Gerona, where, with the deacon Felix, he received the palm of martyrdom during the persecution of Diocletian.")
- Saint Tetricus, Bishop of Langres in Gaul (572)
- Saint Frediano (Frigidanus, Frigdianus), an Irish prince and hermit, and Bishop of Lucca (588) (Note: "At Lucca, in Tuscany, the birthday of the holy bishop Frigdian, who was illustrious by the power of working miracles. His feast is more especially celebrated on the 18th of November, when his body was translated.")
- Saint Egbert of Ripon (729).
- Saint Edward the Martyr, King of England (978) (Note: The son of Edgar the Peaceful, he became King of England at the age of thirteen, in 978 he was murdered by plotters at Corfe and buried in Wareham in Dorset. He was at once acclaimed as a martyr. His relics are venerated in an Orthodox church in Surrey to this day.) (Note: "In England, the holy King Edward, who was assassinated by order of his treacherous stepmother, and became celebrated for many miracles.") (Note: Note the following dates: The first translation of the holy relics, to the church of the Most Holy Mother of God in Wareham, took place on February 13, 980.; On February 13, 981 a great procession of clergy and laity translated the relics to Shaftesbury Abbey, arriving there seven days later, on February 20.; The elevation (uncovering) of the relics of St. Edward took place on June 20, 1001.; St. Edward was officially glorified by an act of the All-English Council of 1008, presided over by St. Alphege, archbishop of Canterbury (who was martyred by the Danes in 1012). King Ethelred ordered that the saint's three feast days (March 18, February 13 and June 20) should be celebrated throughout England.) (see also: February 13 - translation; June 20 - uncovering)

== Post-Schism Orthodox saints ==
- Saint Cyril of Astrakhan (1576)

=== New martyrs and confessors ===
- New Hieromartyr Demetrius Rozanov, Priest (1938)
- Virgin-martyr Natalia Baklanova (1938)
- Saint Maria Skobtsova (Elizabeth Pilenko), nun, who suffered at Ravensbrück concentration camp (1945)

== Other commemorations ==
- Repose of Abbot Mark of Optina Monastery (1909)
- Repose of St. Nicholas of Zhicha, at Libertyville, Illinois (1956)

== Gallery ==
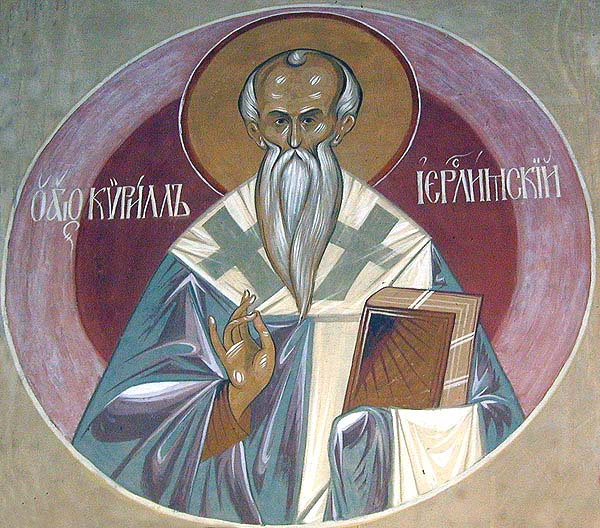
Saint Cyril of Jerusalem.

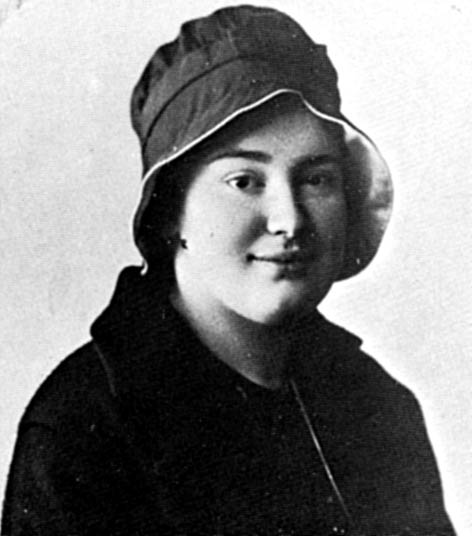
Mother Maria Skobtsova.

== Sources ==
- March 18/March 31. Orthodox Calendar (PRAVOSLAVIE.RU).
- March 31 / March 18. HOLY TRINITY RUSSIAN ORTHODOX CHURCH (A parish of the Patriarchate of Moscow).
- March 18. OCA - The Lives of the Saints.
- The Autonomous Orthodox Metropolia of Western Europe and the Americas (ROCOR). St. Hilarion Calendar of Saints for the year of our Lord 2004. St. Hilarion Press (Austin, TX). p. 22.
- March 18. Latin Saints of the Orthodox Patriarchate of Rome.
- The Roman Martyrology. Transl. by the Archbishop of Baltimore. Last Edition, According to the Copy Printed at Rome in 1914. Revised Edition, with the Imprimatur of His Eminence Cardinal Gibbons. Baltimore: John Murphy Company, 1916. pp. 79–80.

Greek Sources

- Great Synaxaristes: (in Greek) 18 ΜΑΡΤΙΟΥ. ΜΕΓΑΣ ΣΥΝΑΞΑΡΙΣΤΗΣ.
- (in Greek) Συναξαριστής. 18 Μαρτίου. ECCLESIA.GR. (H ΕΚΚΛΗΣΙΑ ΤΗΣ ΕΛΛΑΔΟΣ).

Russian Sources

- (in Russian) 31 марта (18 марта). Православная Энциклопедия под редакцией Патриарха Московского и всея Руси Кирилла (электронная версия). (Orthodox Encyclopedia - Pravenc.ru).
- (in Russian) 18 марта (ст.ст.) 31 марта 2013 (нов. ст.). Русская Православная Церковь Отдел внешних церковных связей. (DECR).
