= George of Kratovo =

South Slavic writer, silversmith and saint (died 1515)

Saint George of Kratovo the New
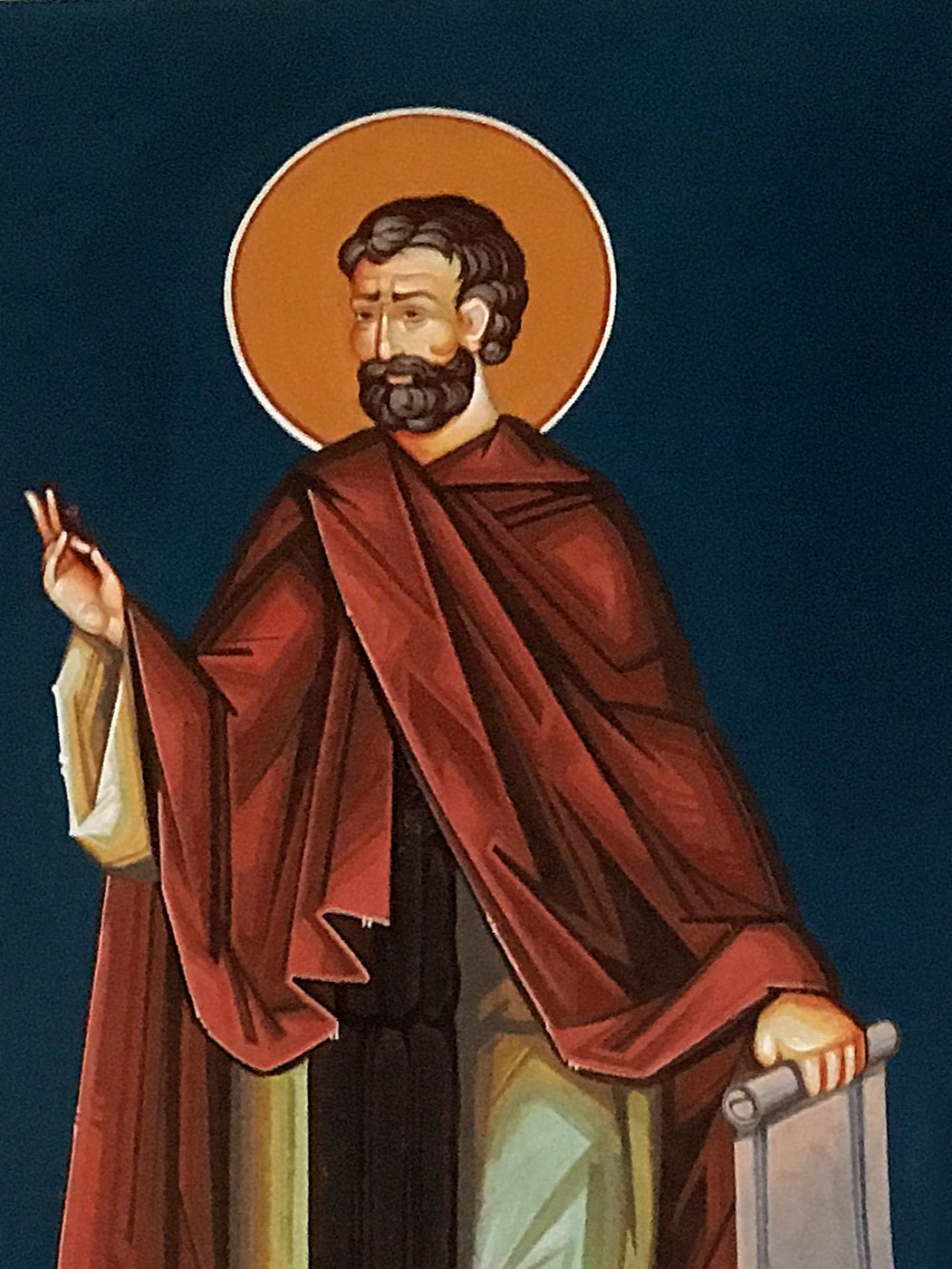
- A contemporary Serbian Orthodox fresco of Saint George of Kratovo

New Martyr
- Hometown: Kratovo, Sanjak of Kyustendil, Ottoman Empire (now North Macedonia)
- Died: 11 February 1515; Sofia, Sanjak of Sofia, Ottoman Empire (now Bulgaria)
- Cause of death: Burning
- Venerated in: Eastern Orthodox Church
- Feast: 11 February; 25 March (Julian Calendar)

George of Kratovo (Serbian: Ђорђе Кратовац, Macedonian: Ѓорѓи Кратовски), also known as George the New of Sofia (Bulgarian: Георги Софийски Нови, romanized: Georgi Sofiyski Novi), was an Eastern Orthodox South Slavic writer and silversmith from Kratovo who was burnt alive by the Ottoman Turks for refusing to convert to Islam.

He is venerated as a saint in the Eastern Orthodox Church under the title of New Martyr.

== Life ==
In his 16th-century biography, it has been maintained that George was of Serbian origin. The priest Peja wrote the liturgical rite and hagiography on Saint George between 1515 and 1523. The work was published by Serbian historian Stojan Novaković in 1867, transcribed from a manuscript held in the National Library of Serbia in Belgrade. Milan Milićević also wrote a work on Saint George in 1885.

Bulgarian Orthodox Church sources maintain his parents were Bulgarians from Kratovo. He became especially honoured during the Bulgarian National Revival, after Paisius of Hilendar included him in the list of Bulgarian saints, in his Istoriya Slavyanobolgarskaya (1762). In 1855 Nikola Karastoyanov from Samokov printed the Life of St. George the New, based on a manuscript kept in the metropolitan library of Sofia. At that time he became popular among Bulgarian painters and was depicted in many churches.

== Martyrdom ==
Saint George was burnt alive on a pyre by the Ottoman Turks on 11 February 1515 in Sofia, after he refused to convert to Islam. His death lead to him being proclaimed a New Martyr. According to the Orthodox Church, George of Kratovo is celebrated on 11 February and 26 May (Julian Calendar).
