= Peja (priest) =

Peja or Peyo (Bulgarian: Пейо, Serbian Cyrillic: Пеја; fl. 1515–23) was an Eastern Orthodox priest active in the Sanjak of Sofia (in the Ottoman Empire, now Bulgaria) in the early 16th century. He wrote the liturgical rite and biography (žitije) on Saint George of Kratovo between 1515 and 1523. The work was published by Serbian scholar and writer Stojan Novaković, transcribed from a manuscript held in the National Library of Serbia in Belgrade. Priest Peja was the spiritual guide and host of the young silversmith George from Kratovo, whom he taught the Bible. George was burnt alive on a pyre on 11 February 1515 after he refused to convert to Islam, due to which he later was proclaimed a New Martyr. Peja then moved from Sofia to Ravanica, the foundation and burial site of Prince Lazar of Serbia, whom he mentioned in his works regarding the Battle of Kosovo (1389).

== See also ==
- George of Kratovo
- Marko Pećki
- Gregory Tsamblak
