= February 13 (Eastern Orthodox liturgics) =

Day in the Eastern Orthodox liturgical calendar

Eastern Orthodox liturgical calendar
February 12	February 13	February 14
February 13 O.S. ≍ February 26 N.S. February 13 N.S ≍ January 31 O.S.

An Eastern Orthodox cross

February 13 in Eastern Orthodox liturgical calendars is a feast day and a day of commemoration of saints and martyrs. Although some Orthodox churches use the Revised Julian Calendar and others use the traditional Julian calendar, the fixed commemorations for their respective February 13 are broadly the same, no matter which calendar is used. (Note: Despite the dates being the same, the days to which they refer typically differ by 13 days. The notation Old Style or O.S. is sometimes used to indicate a date in the traditional Julian Calendar (the "Old Calendar"). The notation New Style or N.S, indicates a date in the Revised Julian calendar (the "New Calendar").)

== Saints ==
- Apostles and martyrs Aquila and his wife Priscilla (1st century) (Note: Name days celebrated today include: Aquila (Ἀκύλας).) (see also: July 8, July 14)
- Holy Two Martyrs, father and son, by crucifixion.
- Saint Timothy, Archbishop of Alexandria (385)
- Venerable Martinian of Caesarea in Palestine (5th century)
- Venerable Zoe of Bethlehem, and the Virgin Photini (5th century)
- Venerable Eulogius of Alexandria, Patriarch of Alexandria (608)
- Righteous Martin the Merciful.

== Pre-Schism Western saints ==
- Martyrs Fusca and Maura, two martyrs in Ravenna under Decius (c. 250) (Note: "At Ravenna, in the time of the emperor Decius, and the governor Quinctian, the Saints Fusca, virgin, and her nurse, Maura, who endured many afflictions, were transpierced with a sword, and thus ended their martyrdom.")
- Saint Julian of Lyon, a martyr venerated in Lyon in France.
- Saint Benignus of Todi, a priest in Todi in Umbria in Italy martyred under Diocletian (c. 303)
- Saint Castor of Karden, hieromonk and missionary in Germany (c. 400)
- Saint Stephen of Lyon, Bishop of Lyon in France, he was active in converting the Arian Burgundians to Orthodoxy, Confessor (512)
- Saint Modomnoc, Bishop of Ossory in Ireland (c. 550) (Note: A disciple of St David in Wales and later a hermit in Tibraghny in Ireland.)
- Saint Stephen of Rieti, an Abbot in Rieti in Italy whom St Gregory the Great describes as 'rude of speech but of cultured life' (c. 590) (Note: "At Rieti, the abbot St. Stephen, a man of wonderful patience, at whose death, as is related by the blessed pope Gregory, the holy angels were present and visible to all.")
- Saint Licinius of Angers (Lezin), Bishop of Angers in France (c. 618) (see also: November 1)
- Saint Huna of Thorney, priest-monk of Huneia (c. 690) (Note: A monk-priest in Ely in England under St Audrey (Etheldred) whom he helped in her last moments. He ended his life as a hermit in the fens near Chatteris, at a place now called Honey Farm after him.)
- Saint Dyfnog, born in Wales, he was much venerated in Clwyd (7th century)
- Saint Ermenilda of Ely (Ermengild, Ermenilda), Abbess of Ely (c. 700)
- Saint Aimo (Aimonius), founder of the convent of St Victor in Meda in the north of Italy (c. 790)
- Saint Gosbert, fourth Bishop of Osnabruck in Germany and a disciple of St Ansgar (c. 859)
- Saint Fulcran, Bishop of Lodève in Languedoc in France, famous for his asceticism, he was bishop for over half a century (1006)

== Post-Schism Orthodox saints ==
- Venerable Symeon the Myrrh-gusher (Stefan Nemanja), Grand Prince of Serbia (1200) (Note: His relics were transferred to the Studenica monastery in 1208.)
- Saint Joseph of Volokolamsk, founder of Volokolamsk (Volotsk) Monastery (1515)
- Saint George Konissky (Yurij Konissky), Archbishop of Mogilev in Belorussia (1795)
- Saint Seraphim (Sobolev), Archbishop of Bogucharsk and Wonderworker of Sofia (1950) (Note: See: (in Russian) Серафим (Соболев). Википедии. (Russian Wikipedia).)

=== New martyrs and confessors ===
- New Hieromartyrs Basil Triumfov and Gabriel Preobrazhensky, Priests (1919)
- New Hieromartyrs Leontius Grimalsky, Archpriest, of Gzhel, Moscow, and Zosima Trubachev, (Note: See: (in Russian) Трубачёв, Зосима Васильевич. Википедии. (Russian Wikipedia).) Archpriest, of Maloyaroslavets (1938)
- New Hieromartyrs (1938):

- Nicholas Dobrolyubov, Basil Gorbachev, (Note: See: (in Russian) Горбачёв, Василий Григорьевич. Википедии. (Russian Wikipedia).) John Pokrovsky, Vladimir Pokrovsky, Parthenius Gruzinov, John Kalabukhov, John Kosinsky, Michael Popov, Priests;
- Eugene Nikolsky, Deacon;
- Virgin-martyrs Anna Korneeva, Vera Morozova and Irina Khvostova.
- Martyr Paul Sokolov;

== Other commemorations ==
- Consecration of the Church of the Theotokos and Saint Thekla, on Mount Posaleos.
- Translation of the relics (980 and 981) of Saint Edward the Martyr, King of England (978) (Note: Note the following historical dates and feast days: The first translation of the holy relics, to the church of the Most Holy Mother of God in Wareham, took place on February 13, 980.; On February 13, 981 a great procession of clergy and laity translated the relics to Shaftesbury Abbey, arriving there seven days later, on February 20.; The elevation (uncovering) of the relics of St. Edward took place on June 20, 1001.; St. Edward was officially glorified by an act of the All-English Council of 1008, presided over by St. Alphege, Archbishop of Canterbury (who was martyred by the Danes in 1012). King Ethelred ordered that the saint's three feast days — March 18, February 13 and June 20 — should be celebrated throughout England.) (see also: June 20 - uncovering, and March 18 - feast)
- Icon of the Theotokos 'Dolinsky'.
- Synaxis of the Saints of Omsk.
- Repose of Abbess Seraphima of Sezenovo (1877)

== Icon gallery ==
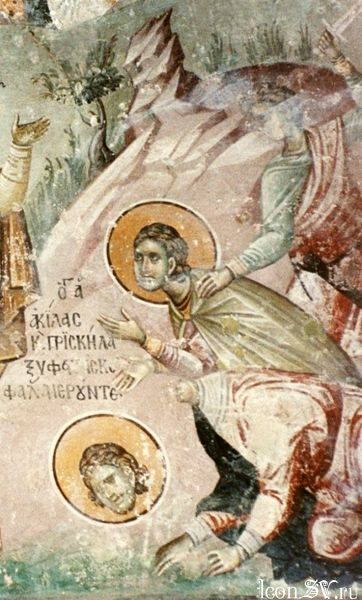
Martyrdom of Apostle Aquila.

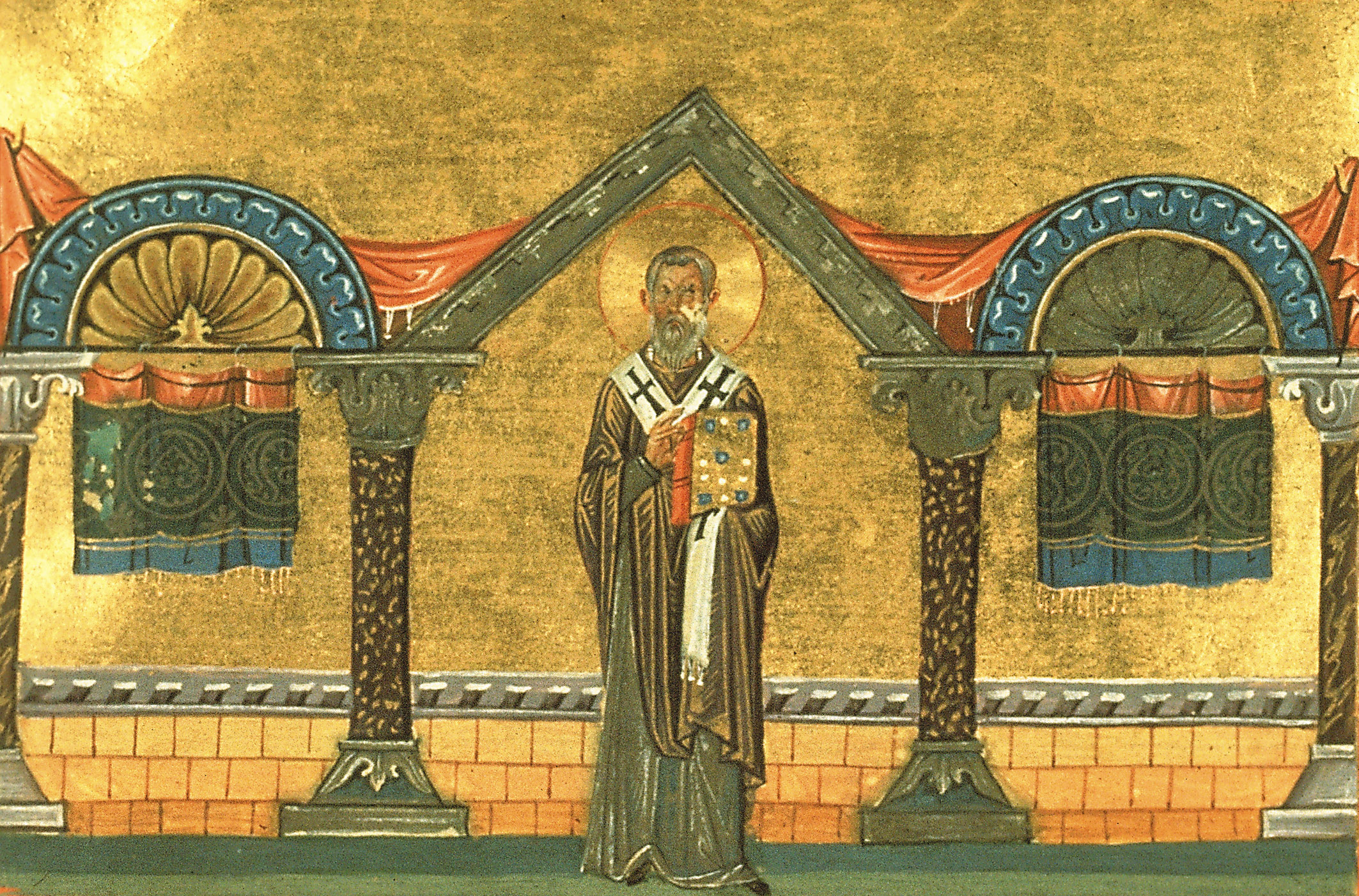
Venerable Eulogius of Alexandria.

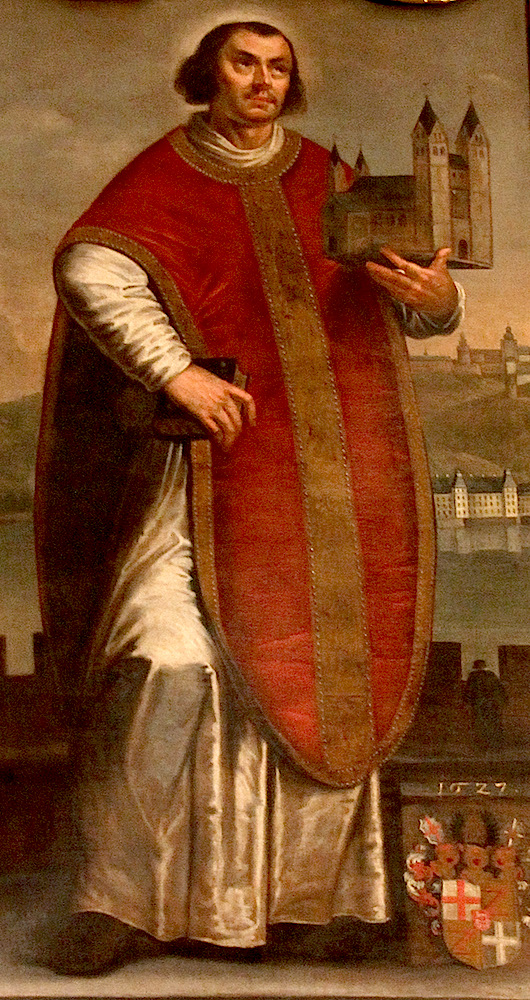
St Castor of Karden

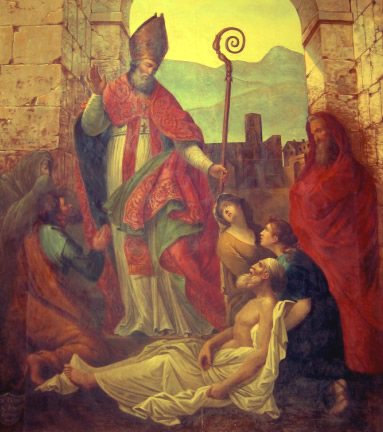
St Fulcran, Bishop of Lodève.

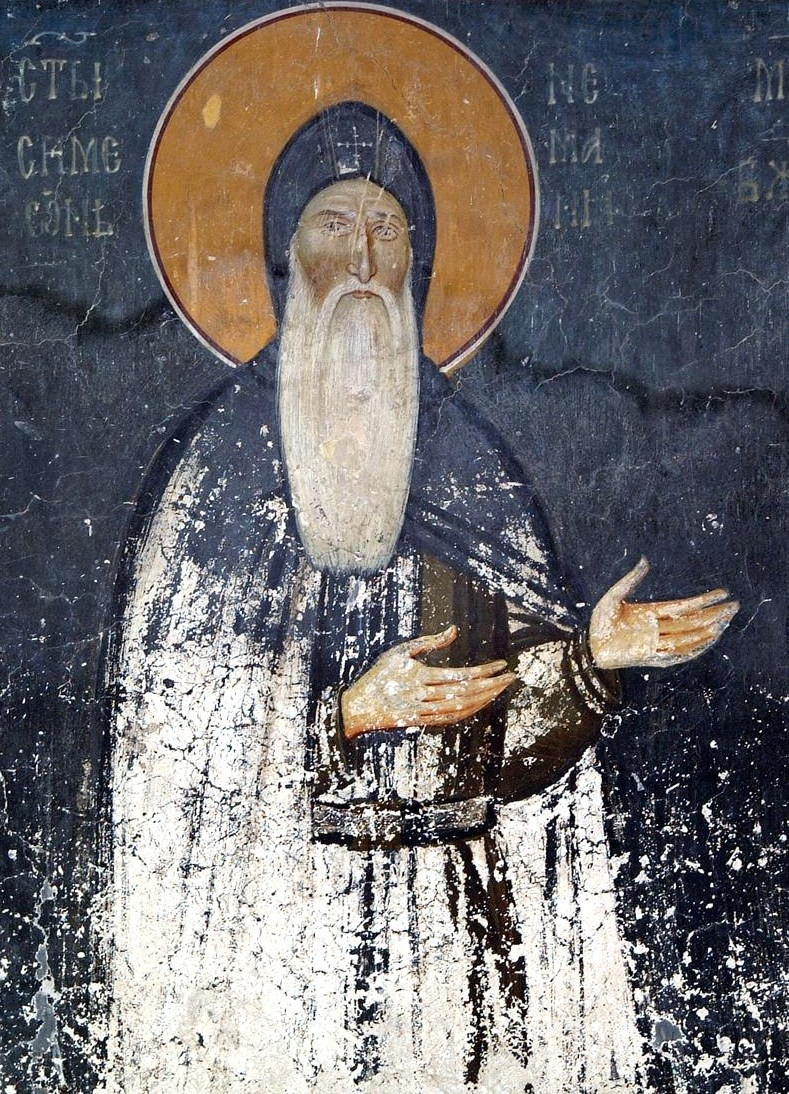
Venerable Symeon the Myrrh-gusher.

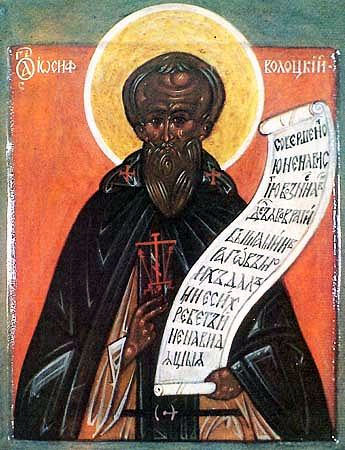
St Joseph of Volokolamsk.

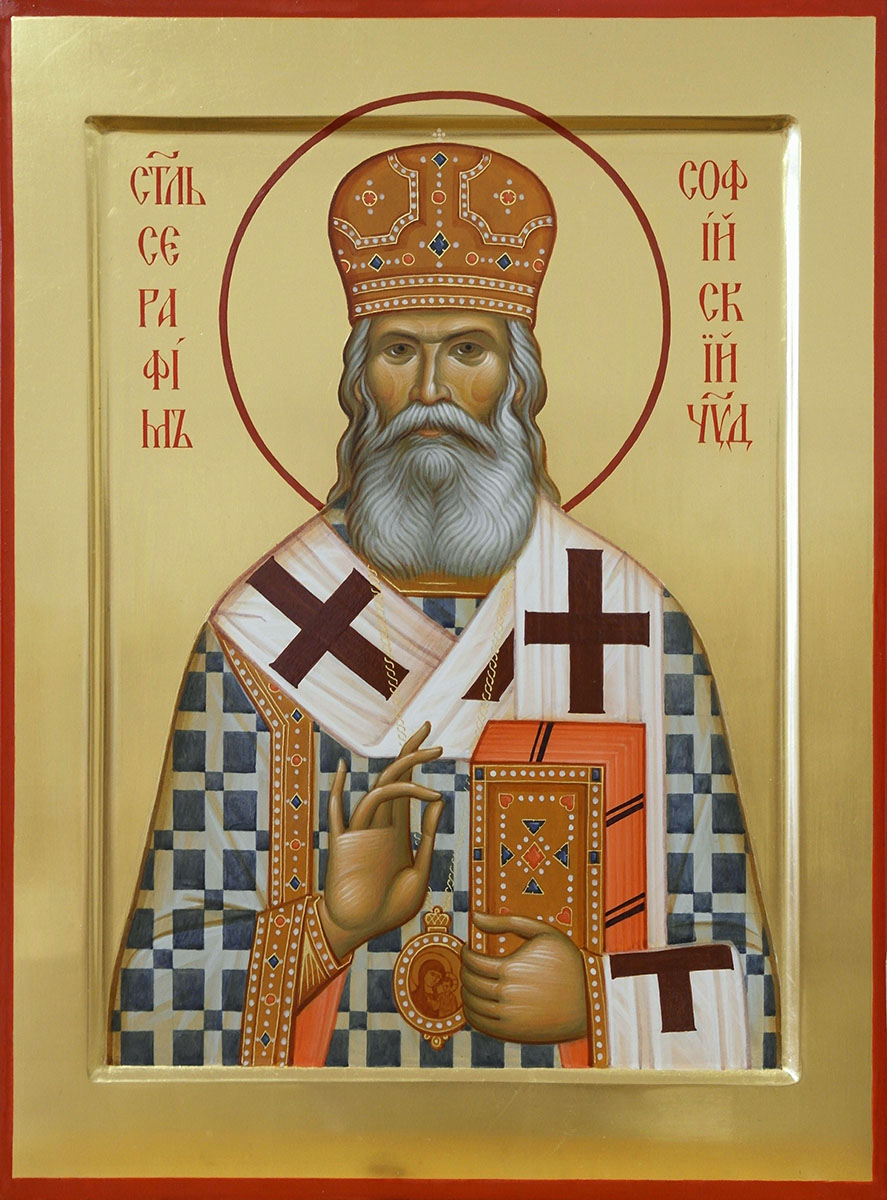
St Seraphim (Sobolev), Abp. of Bogucharsk and Wonderworker of Sofia.

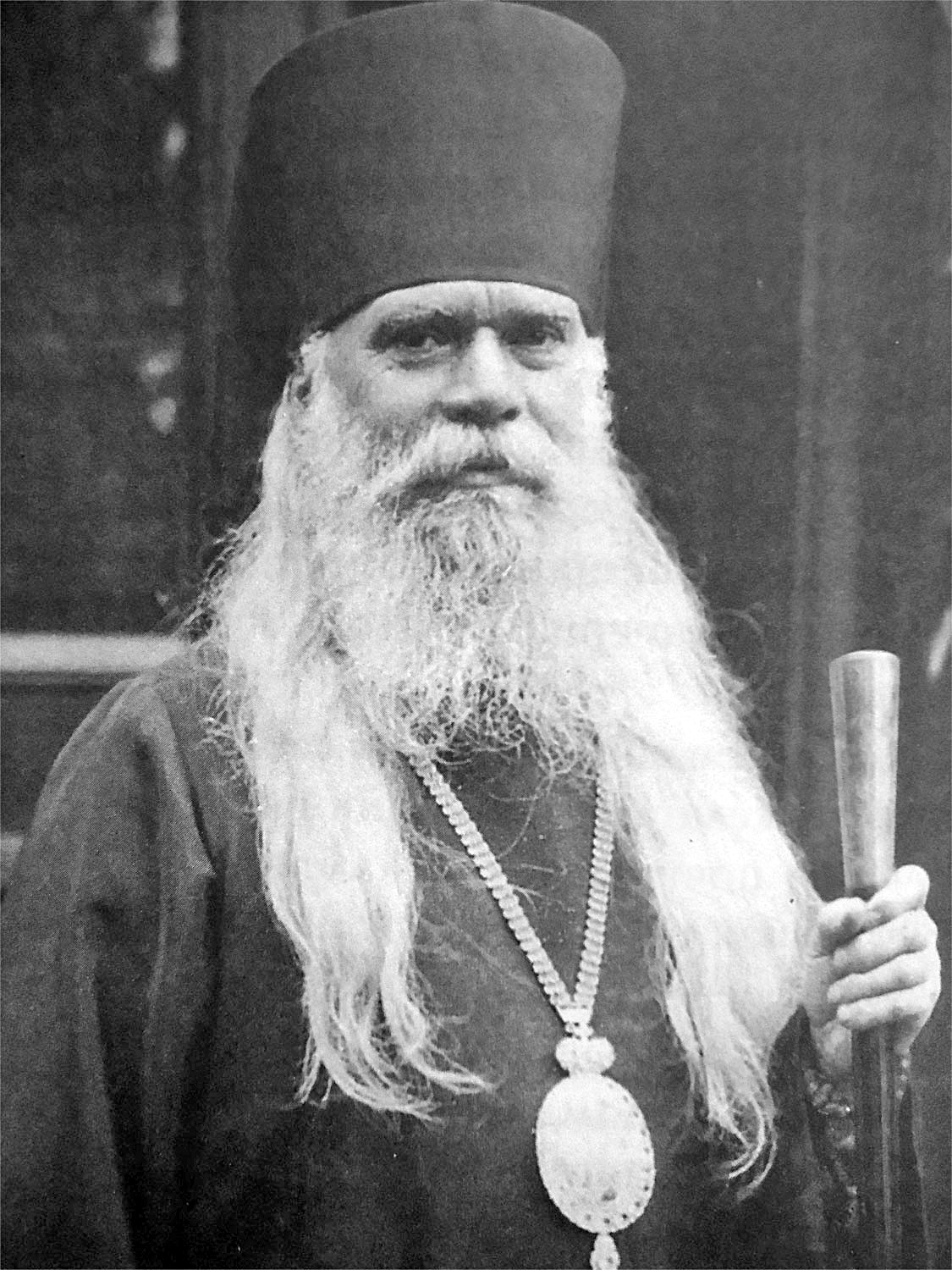
St Seraphim (Sobolev), Abp. of Bogucharsk and Wonderworker of Sofia.

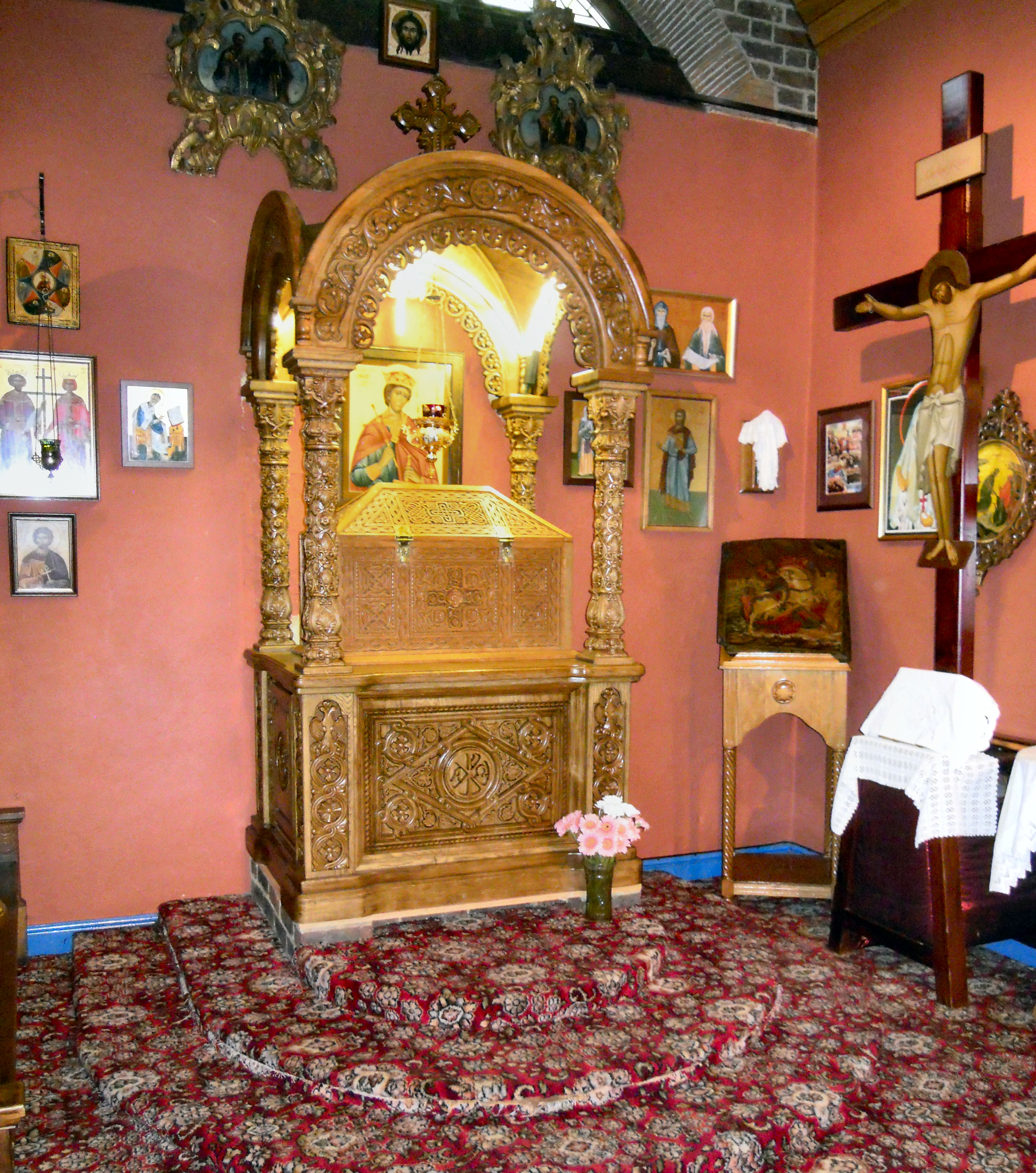
The Shrine of St Edward in the Church of St. Edward the Martyr, Brookwood.

== Sources ==
- February 13 / 26. Orthodox Calendar (Pravoslavie.ru).
- February 26 / 13. Holy Trinity Russian Orthodox Church (A parish of the Patriarchate of Moscow).
- February 13. OCA - The Lives of the Saints.
- The Autonomous Orthodox Metropolia of Western Europe and the Americas. St. Hilarion Calendar of Saints for the year of our Lord 2004. St. Hilarion Press (Austin, TX). pp. 14–15.
- The Thirteenth Day of the Month of February. Orthodoxy in China.
- February 13. Latin Saints of the Orthodox Patriarchate of Rome.
- The Roman Martyrology. Transl. by the Archbishop of Baltimore. Last Edition, According to the Copy Printed at Rome in 1914. Revised Edition, with the Imprimatur of His Eminence Cardinal Gibbons. Baltimore: John Murphy Company, 1916. pp. 46–47.
- Rev. Richard Stanton. A Menology of England and Wales, or, Brief Memorials of the Ancient British and English Saints Arranged According to the Calendar, Together with the Martyrs of the 16th and 17th Centuries. London: Burns & Oates, 1892. pp. 66–68.

Greek Sources

- Great Synaxaristes: (in Greek) 13 Φεβρουαριου. Μεγασ Συναξαριστησ.
- (in Greek) Συναξαριστής. 13 Φεβρουαρίου. Ecclesia.gr. (H Εκκλησια Τησ Ελλαδοσ).

Russian Sources

- (in Russian) 26 февраля (13 февраля). Православная Энциклопедия под редакцией Патриарха Московского и всея Руси Кирилла (электронная версия). (Orthodox Encyclopedia - Pravenc.ru).
- (in Russian) 13 февраля по старому стилю / 26 февраля по новому стилю. СПЖ "Союз православных журналистов". 2018.
