= Sava Trlajić =

Serbian Orthodox saint

Saint Sava of Gornji Karlovac
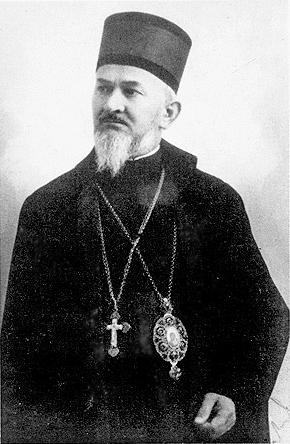

Archimandrite, New Hieromartyr
- Born: Svetozar Trlajić; 19 July 1884; Mol, Austria-Hungary
- Died: August 1941 (aged 57); Velebit, Independent State of Croatia
- Venerated in: Eastern Orthodox Church
- Canonized: 1998, Belgrade, Serbia and Montenegro by Holy Assembly of Bishops of the Serbian Orthodox Church
- Feast: 17 July (O.S. 4 July)
- Attributes: episcopal vestments

Sava Trlajić (Serbian Cyrillic: Сава Трлајић; 19 July 1884 – August 1941) was a bishop of the Serbian Orthodox Church serving as Bishop of the Eparchy of Gornji Karlovac in the Kingdom of Yugoslavia from 1938 until the beginning of World War II.

He was martyred by the Ustaše in the Nazi puppet state of the Independent State of Croatia sometime in August 1941. The Serbian Orthodox Church venerates him as a saint, with the titles of new martyr and hieromartyr.

== Biography ==
=== Early life ===
He was born as Svetozar Trlajić to his parents Stevan and Jelisaveta (née Karakašević) in Mol on 18 July 1884. His education included the primary school in his hometown, a grammar school in Novi Sad, and seminary of Sremski Karlovci. He then went on to graduate from the Faculty of Law at the University of Belgrade and passed the qualifying examination for judges at the Faculty of Law at the University of Zagreb.

=== Career ===
In 1909, he was ordained a deacon by the Bishop of Timișoara and then as a priest ten days later. As a parish priest, he served at parishes in Peška and Bašaid. Early in 1927, he was appointed to an administrative position, and later principal secretary, of the Holy Synod of Bishops of the Church of Serbia. When his wife died, he took monastic vows on 27 October 1929 in the Krušedol Monastery, being tonsured with the name Sava. Soon afterward he became rector and archimandrite of the Krušedol Monastery.

On 30 September 1930, Sava was elected Auxiliary Bishop of Sremski Karlovci. He was consecrated there by Patriarch Varnava, Bishop Emilijan of Timok, Bishop Jovan of Niš, Bishop Tihon of the Eparchy of Zahumlje and Herzegovina, and Bishop Simeon of Zletovo and Strumica. As Patriarchal Vicar Bishop Sava chaired the diocesan council of the Archbishopric of Belgrade and Karlovci. From early 1937, Bishop Sava chaired the ecclesiastical court. He was appointed Bishop of Gornji Karlovac on 22 June 1938, with his residence in Plaški. After the death of Bishop Miron of Pakrac in 1941, he was also named administrator of the Eparchy of Slavonia.

=== Invasion of Yugoslavia, capture and martyrdom ===
After the invasion of Yugoslavia and the formation of the Independent State of Croatia in April 1941, Plaški was first occupied by Italian forces and then turned over to the Ustaše in late 1941. Bishop Sava and nine priests were then taken hostage. On 23 May 1941, the Ustaše occupied the bishop's residence and expelled him from it.

On 8 June, the notorious executioner Josip Tomljenović ordered all diocesan money and records to be handed over to the Ustaše. Sava refused the Ustaše order to leave his diocese and go to Belgrade, not wanting to abandon his flock. Bishop Sava was arrested on 17 June, 1941, and confined, together with three other Serbian priests and thirteen eminent Serbian laymen, in a stable owned by Josip Tomljenović in Plaški. After experiencing intense torture, Bishop Sava and the priests, Bogoljub Gaković, Đuro Stojanović, and Stanislav Nasadilo, were chained and taken to the Gospić concentration camp on 19 July 1941. There, they were tortured until mid-August. At that time Bishop Sava was taken together with 2,000 Serbs toward the Velebit Mountains. Somewhere on this mountain, he was murdered together with thousands of other Orthodox Serbs. The exact site is still unknown.

== Canonization ==
In 1998, at the regular session of the Holy Assembly of Bishops of the Serbian Orthodox Church, Bishop Sava was glorified and entered into the menologium of the Serbian Orthodox Church as a hieromartyr and new martyr.

== See also ==
- List of Serbian saints
