= Larisa (Argos) =

Acropolis of Argos, Greece

Coordinates: 37°38′19″N 22°42′52″E

Kastro Larisa
- Part of Larisa
- Argos
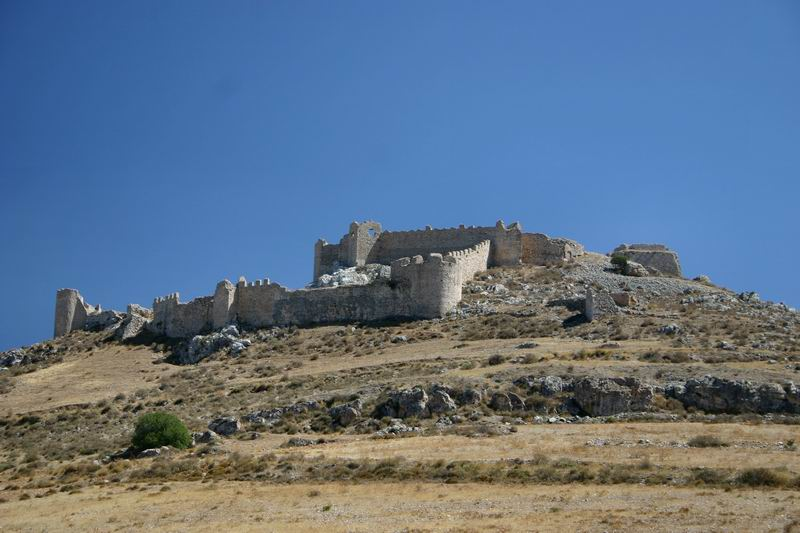
- Kastro Larisa

Site information
- Type: Castle
- Open to the public: Yes
- Condition: Ruined

Location
- Location in Greece
- Location within Greece

Site history
- Materials: Stone
- Events: Various Hellenistic & Roman conflicts (involving previous fortifications); Fourth Crusade, Ottoman–Venetian Wars, Greek War of Independence involving present structure & additions

Larisa (Greek: Λάρισα, also Κάστρο Λάρισα, "Castle Larisa") is the ancient and medieval acropolis of Argos, located on a high rocky hill, within the town's boundaries to the west. According to Strabo, it is named for a group of Pelasgians. The summit is occupied by the ruins of a Byzantine-Venetian castle, below it, roughly midway down the slope of the mountain, is Panagia Katakekrymeni-Portokalousa monastery, and opposite the castle entrance, the Monastery of Agia Marina (Saint Margaret), a nunnery. The site was fortified and in continuous use for nineteen centuries.

== History ==
=== Ancient ===
In Mycenean times, the principal settlement and temple were on the Aspis hill, to the north of Larisa. This community that kept its main cemetery on the col of Deiras, between them, which in classical time became the location of the Deiras Gate. The eastern slope of Larisa and the flat ground to its east was settled in the Late Bronze Age by the Dorians, and their settlement and temple became the nucleus of Classical Argos.

Long walls (analogous to the Athenian Long Walls) connecting to Nauplion were begun circa 421 BC by Athenian masons. At one point, in fear of a threatened Spartan invasion, the Argives committed unskilled men, women and slaves to work on the wall; despite these efforts, the wall was only half-completed when Argos was attacked by King Agis II of Sparta, whose men pulled down all the walls.

Argive history is somewhat sketchy for part of the next century due to unsettled conditions there — according to an Athenian court case of Pseudo-Demosthenes, the Argolic Gulf was full of pirates who sold their stolen goods in the agora at Argos with impunity — but at some point before 272 BC the city was re-walled, as it had walls and gates when it was attacked by Pyrrhus of Epirus, who was killed there after he and his men were trapped when the gate through which they wished to retreat was blocked by the corpse of a slain war elephant.

The later walls connected dual citadels on Larisa and Aspis, and then continued around their eastern slopes to surround the classical city. There were gates at each of the cardinal directions: the Gates of Deiras to the west (on the road to Mantinea); the Nemean Gate to the north on the road to Nemea; the Eileithuian Gate to the Heraion of Argos and Epidaurus and the Kylabris Gate on the road to Nauplia, both to the east; and a gate to the south that led to Tegea. They surrounded only the important parts of the classical city and did not attempt to reach the sea at Nauplia like the earlier long walls, extending a maximum of only 300 metres (980 ft) east from Larisa before turning north to eventually complete their circuit at Aspis.

By the second century BC, Argos and the Achaean League were allied with Philip V of Macedon who was at first an opponent, then an ally of Rome. The Argives were split between pro-and-anti-Roman parties. The pro-Romans signed a treaty with the Romans against Philip and brought in the Achaean commander Ainesidemos, while the anti-Romans summoned a Macedonian force under Philokles to support them. The two sides clashed in the agora beneath Larisa, but the outnumbered Ainesidemos surrendered his force. Ainesidemos negotiated a truce under which his men were permitted to leave the city, but he himself refused the offer and was put to death. In 198 Philip met with representatives of the Achaean League to negotiate the return of Argos and Corinth to Achaean control, but he instead decided to give the city to Nabis, the reformist king-tyrant of Sparta, who then occupied Larisa and Aspis with his troops and sent many of the aristocracy into exile or to Sparta as hostages. The Achaeans then approached Titus Quinctius Flamininus, who had already promised to hand over both cities to the Achaeans if he defeated Philip. After Philip's defeat at the Battle of Cynoscephalae, Flamininus marched his army to link up with the Achaean force at Cleonae, from whence they proceeded to the Argive plain to besiege Argos. Nabis had further fortified both citadels. After initial skirmishing, Flamininus waited outside the walls to see if the Argives would rise up against Nabis; when they did not, he was persuaded by his Greek allies to march south to attack Sparta instead, as the Spartans were the ultimate source of the conflict. Eventually this move forced Nabis to surrender Argos to the Achaean party. The Romans initially occupied both Larisa and Aspis, but Flamininus kept his word and evacuated Roman troops from them and from the Acrocorinth in 194 BC.

Larisa fell to the Ostrogoths under Alaric I in 395 AD, who sold many of the inhabitants into slavery, and it fell to a Slavic incursion in 600 AD.

=== Middle Ages ===
The Byzantines founded a new castle there in the 12th century. In 1212, it was captured by the Crusader Geoffrey of Villehardouin. It was surrendered to the Duke of Athens, Otto de la Roche, in exchange for military assistance, becoming one of the chief fortresses of the Lordship of Argos and Nauplia. In the 14th century it underwent repairs to its foundations, and under its new bailiffs, the brothers Walter and Francis Foucherolles, held fast despite the depredations of the Catalan Company, which had conquered the Duchy of Athens, and were threatening the Argolid as well.

In 1388, Argos and Nauplia were sold by the last heiress, Maria of Enghien, to the Republic of Venice. Before Venice could take control, however, the Despot of the Morea Theodore I Palaiologos, and his ally and father-in-law Nerio I Acciaioli seized them with the aid of an Ottoman army under Evrenos. Although the Venetians were quickly able to oust Nerio from Nauplia, Argos remained in Theodore's hands for six years. In 1393, Theodore, along with other Byzantine and Serbian vassals were summoned to Serres by the Ottoman sultan Bayezid I. After the other vassals complained of Theodore's behavior in using Albanian mercenaries to add Argos and other places in the Peloponnese to his dominions, Bayezid ordered Theodore to accompany him on a military expedition in Thessaly, and the cession of Argos and Monemvasia to Ottoman control. Theodore obeyed, but later escaped and recovered Monemvasia, but agreed to sell Argos to Venetians, which they occupied on 11 June 1394. A year later, Argos town was sacked by troops of the Ottoman dynasty fresh from their victory over a Crusader army at the Battle of Nicopolis; these had already temporarily occupied Athens and would go on to defeat Theodore before ravaging the rest of the Peloponnese and then withdrawing. Argos and Larisa remained in Venetian hands until conquered by the Ottomans at the outbreak of the First Ottoman–Venetian War in 1463.

=== Modern ===
In 1821 the castle at the summit was captured by Demetrios Ypsilantis in the Greek War of Independence. It played little to no role in subsequent military actions. A nunnery had been built on the slopes in the 18th century, followed by a male monastery (now a church) in the 19th century. At one point during the War of Independence the monastery was briefly used as a national mint to strike coins for the provisional government, before this function was transferred to a facility on Aegina.

== Gallery ==
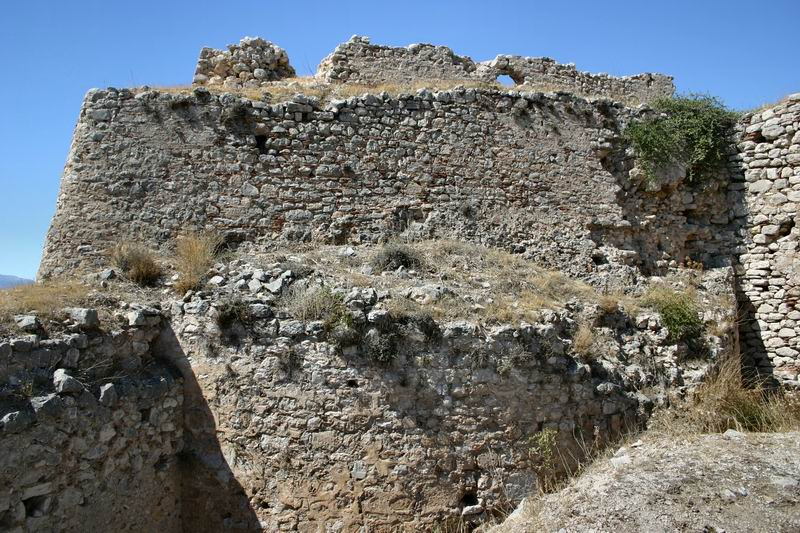
A Venetian polygonal bastion behind a Turkish round bastion

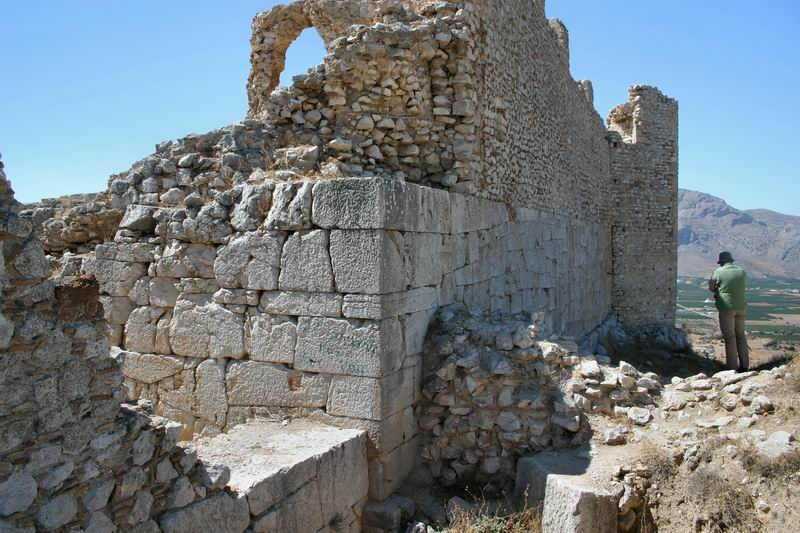
Hellenistic walls

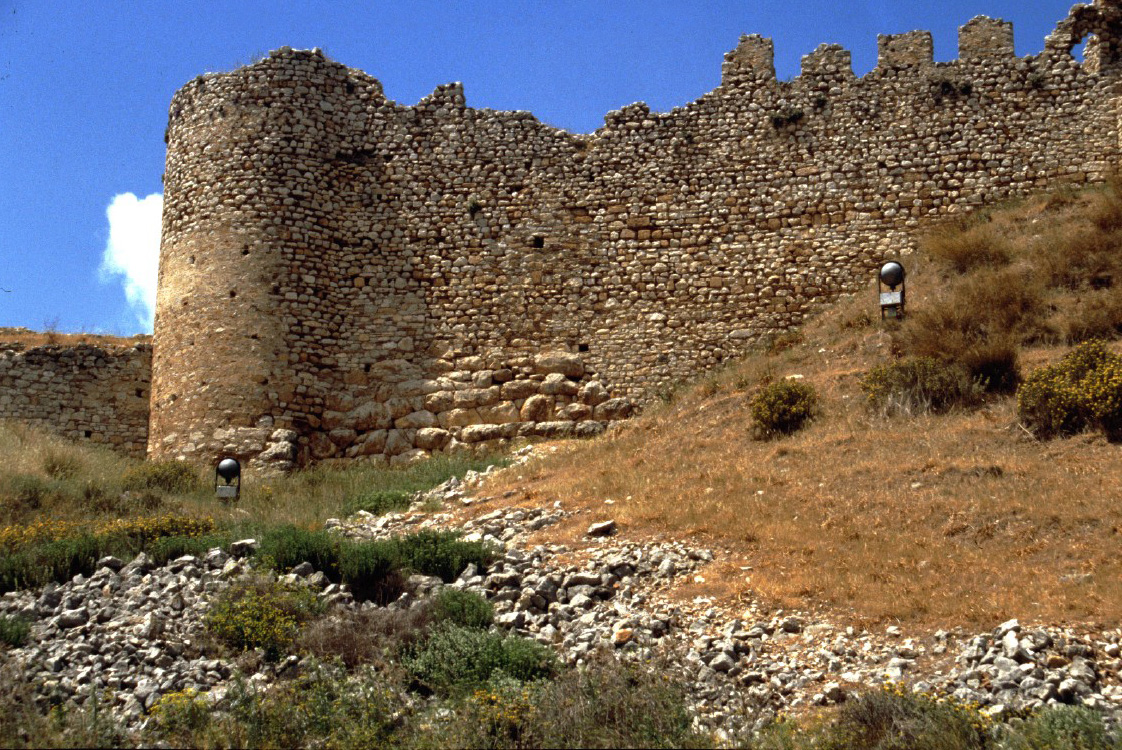
Frankish walls
