= New Martyr =

Recent Christian martyrs and confessors

The title of New Martyr or Neomartyr (Greek: νεο- neo- 'new' + μάρτυρ martyr 'witness') is conferred in some denominations of Christianity to distinguish more recent martyrs and confessors from the earlier martyrs under the Roman Empire.

The earliest source to use the term neomartys is the Narrationes of Anastasius of Sinai, who died around 700. The title continued to be used for the next three hundred years to refer to victims of Umayyad and Abbasid persecution. It was mainly used in Greek sources, but is occasionally found in Arabic, Georgian and Syriac sources. Between the 11th and 14th centuries, the Byzantine–Seljuq wars also generated a number of neomartyrs.

The Greek Orthodox Church traditionally gives the title to those who had been tortured and executed during Ottoman rule in Greece in order to avoid forced conversion to Islam. This meaning is the dominant one, so much so that pre-Ottoman use of the term has been almost ignored in academia. Sectarian conflicts of the 19th century within the Ottoman Empire and Communist persecution in eastern Europe also generated saints considered neomartyrs.

== List of new martyrs ==
=== Under Umayyad rule ===
- Euphemia of Damascus (before 700)
- Sixty Martyrs of Jerusalem (725)

=== Under Abbasid rule ===
- Elias of Heliopolis (779)
- Romanus (780)
- Theophilus the New (780s)
- Abo of Tiflis (786)
- Bacchus-Ḍaḥḥāk (786/7)
- George-Muzāḥim (978)

=== Under Turkish rule ===
The first new martyrs were recorded after the Seljuk invasion of Asia Minor (11th century). In the Eastern Orthodox Church, the third Sunday after Pentecost is known as the "Commemoration of All New Martyrs of the Turkish Yoke."

- Ahmed the Calligrapher or Ahmed Kalfas
- Akylina of Chalkidike
- Anthimos the Georgian
- Aquilina of Thessalonica
- Athanasios the Neomartyr
- Boris the Pomak
- Chrestos the Albanian
- Chrysostomos of Smyrna
- Constantin Brâncoveanu
- Constantine Hagarit
- Cosmas of Aetolia
- Cyril VI of Constantinople, ethnomartyr
- Demetrios Doukas
- Demetrios of Philadelphia
- Demetrios the Neomartyr
- Ephraim the Neomartyr
- Gabriel I of Pec
- Patriarch Gabriel II of Constantinople
- George of Ioannina
- George of Kratovo (d. 1515)
- George the New
- George of Sofia (d. 1437)
- Gregory V of Constantinople
- Hasan
- Helen of Sinope
- John Calphas ("the Apprentice")
- John of Ioannina, a.k.a. John the Tailor
- John of Konitsa
- John the New of Suceava
- Jordan of Trebizond
- Archbishop Kyprianos of Cyprus
- Makarios the Monk
- Michael Mavroudis
- Michael of Alexandria
- Niketas the Younger (d. 1282-1304)
- Paisius and Habakkuk
- Panteleimon Dousa
- Paul of Constantinople, 6/19 April 1683
- Paul the Russian
- Philothei
- Theocharis of Nevşehir (Neapoli)
- Teodor of Vršac
- Theodore Gabras (d. 1098)
- Theodore of Komogovina
- Thomas Paschidis
- Zlata of Meglen

=== Under Communist rule ===
In the Russian Orthodox Church, the Sunday closest to 25 January (7 February on the Gregorian Calendar) is the "Sunday of the Holy New Martyrs and Confessors of Russia." The date of 25 January was chosen because that was the date in 1918 of the martyrdom of St. Vladimir (Bogoiavlensikii), Metropolitan of Kiev, who is referred to as the "Protomartyr of the communist yoke in Russia."

- Alexander Hotovitzky
- Anastasia Hendrikova
- Andronic Nikolsky
- Bishop Arcadius Ostalsky,
- Bishop Arseny Zhadanovsky, who was the last abbot of the Chudov Monastery which was also destroyed
- Bishop Basil (Preobrashensky) of Kineshma
- Archbishop Dimitry (Dobroserdov)
- Grand Duchess Elizabeth Fyodorovna and Nun Barbara
- Dr. Eugene Botkin (see Romanov sainthood)
- Bishop Hermogenes (Dolganyov)
- Metropolitan Benjamin of Petrograd
- John Kochurov of Tsarskoye Selo (First martyr of the Revolution)
- Archpriest John Vostorgov
- Metropolitan Joseph, 1938
- Archimandrite Kronid Lubimov
- Archpriest Makary Kvitkin
- Margarete of Menzelinsk
- Maria of Gatchina, c. 1930
- Bishop Maxim of Serpukhov 23 June/6 July 1931
- Nicholas II of Russia with his immediate family and servants (see Romanov sainthood)
- Fr. Nicholas Zagorovsky, 1943 (confessor)
- Bishop Nikita Dilektorsky
- Nikodim of Solovki
- Archbishop Nikolay Dobronravov
- Metropolitan Peter of Krutitsy
- Metropolitan Seraphim Chichagov of St. Petersburg
- Serafin Ostroumov, Russian Orthodox bishop, arrested in 1936 and sentenced to imprisonment. In 1937, after a renewed investigation, he was sentenced to death and executed, likely in the Katyn forest.
- Patriarch Tikhon, 1925 (confessor)
- Vladimir Beneshevich
- Metropolitan Vladimir (Bogoyavlensky) First hierarch martyred by the Bolsheviks.
- Bishop Platon (Kulbusch)

=== Under Nazism ===
- Alexander Schmorell, member of the White Rose Resistance group
- Bishop Gorazd of Prague
- Archimandrite Grigol Peradze
- Maria Skobtsova of Paris and Ravensbrück, nun

=== Serbia ===
The feast of "All New Martyrs of Serbia" is celebrated on 28 June [O.S. 15 June].

- George of Slavonia
- Gorazd Pavlik
- Joanikije Lipovac
- Lazarus of Serbia
- Peter of Dabar-Bosnia
- Platon of Banja Luka
- Raphael of Šišatovac
- Sava of Gornji Karlovac
- Vukašin of Klepci

=== Boxer Rebellion ===
24 June [O.S. 11 June] is celebrated as the feast of the "New Martyrs of China Slain During the Boxer Rebellion"

- Ia the Teacher
- Holy Martyrs of China

=== Austria-Hungary ===
- Hieromartyr Maximus Sandovic, 24August/6 September 1914

=== Post-Soviet Russia ===
- Daniel Sysoyev Muscovite priest and missionary assassinated by an Islamist militant
- Yevgeny Rodionov, a Russian soldier who fought in First Chechen War, was taken prisoner, tortured and eventually murdered for his refusal to convert to Islam

As of 2016 the Russian Orthodox Church has not glorified either of the martyrs listed above, but each has received widespread popular veneration.

=== Under the Islamic State ===
- 21 Coptic Martyrs of Libya, 21 Coptic Christians kidnapped and beheaded by Islamic State militants in Sirte, Libya.

== See also ==
- Aftermath of World War II
- Hieromartyr
