= Aquilina of Thessalonica =

18th century Greek Orthodox Christian saint and martyr

Saint Aquilina of Thessalonica Ακουιλίνα

Martyr
- Born: Zagliberi, Ottoman Empire
- Died: September 27, 1764
- Cause of death: Beating
- Venerated in: Eastern Orthodox Church
- Feast: September 27

Saint Aquilina of Thessalonica (Greek: Ακουιλίνα) was an 18th-century Greek Orthodox Christian saint and martyr. She was born in Zagliberi, a village near Thessalonica in Greece at a time when Greece was under the rule of the Ottoman Empire. When she was a baby her father accidentally killed a Muslim neighbour, and converted to Islam in order to escape execution.

However, Aquilina's mother raised her as a Christian. When she reached the age of eighteen, the Ottoman authorities pressured her father to make her convert to Islam as well. When she refused, she was arrested and beaten to death on September 27, 1764. Her relics were hidden by Christians to avoid desecration, and were only discovered in 2012, in the nearby town of Ossa, Thessaloniki. She is commemorated as a saint in the Eastern Orthodox Church, with feast day on September 27.
