= Michael of Alexandria (martyr) =

Michael of Alexandria (died c. 1311–1325), also called Michael the Younger, was a Mamluk official who attempted to convert to Christianity and was executed. In the Eastern Orthodox Church, he is reckoned one of the neomartyrs.

According to his biography, he was captured in his youth during a "barbarian attack" on Smyrna, probably in the 1290s. The culprits were probably either from the emirate of Aydin or Menteshe or else the Catalan Grand Company. They would have sold him to the Mamluks in Egypt. He converted to Islam and received an education, becoming an official in the Mamluk army in Alexandria. After some years, he wished to return to his earlier faith. Seeing an opportunity in the arrival of a Byzantine embassy, he disguised himself as a monk and boarded a Byzantine ship. He was denounced, however, and arrested. Muslim officials attempted to change his mind by blandishments and threats, but he refused and was thrown in prison. Remaining steadfast in his new faith, he was beheaded. This took place during the reign of Andronikos II Palaiologos, probably between about 1311 and 1325.

Theodore Metochites wrote a biography of Michael not long after his death in an atticizing style of Greek aimed at an elite audience. It is an oration that was delivered before the emperor Andronikos, probably sometime between 1305 and 1324.
