= Demetrius the Neomartyr =

Orthodox Christian saint

Demetrius the Neomartyr (Peloponnese)

Neomartyr
- Born: Floka, Messenia
- Died: Tripoli
- Venerated in: Eastern Orthodoxy
- Major shrine: Saint Demetrius Church, Tripoli
- Feast: 14 April

Saint Demetrius the Neomartyr (Greek: Άγιος Δημήτριος Νεομάρτυρας, or Άγιος Δημήτριος Ο Νέος) (1779-1803) is an Orthodox Christian saint, commemorated on 14 April in the Church of Greece.

== Early life ==
Demetrius was a Greek Orthodox Christian boy born in Floka and raised in Ligouditsa, both in the region of Messinia. As with most of Greece at the time, the region was ruled by the Ottoman Empire. His mother died when he was very young, and his father, Elias, remarried. Due to ill-treatment by his stepmother, Demetrius left home and went to seek work in Tripoli, the regional capital, where he was apprenticed to a builder.

He converted to Islam but later repented. He worked for a time as a barber, before the abbot of the Monastery of the Precious Forerunner recommended him to a monastery on the island of Chios where he stayed for a time.

== Public confession and martyrdom ==
Demetrius fell into a deep depression when the weight of his sin fully weighed in and decided that to expiate his mistake, he must perform a great penance: returning to Tripoli to confess publicly that he was recanting his conversion to Islam. His abbot tried to dissuade him, to no avail, and Demetrius returned to Tripoli and publicly confessed his re-conversion to Christianity several times. This included him going to his former barber boss and asking him to slit his throat right there, which neither the boss nor the other barbers did. When this didn't work, he went up to the guards of a nearby leader and told them he had apostatized, which got him detained.

Demetrius was taken to the presence of a Turkish judge, judged for apostasy from Islam, convicted and sentenced to die in 1803, despite the attempted intercession of a Turkish friend, who tried to cover up for him by altering the records of Demetrius' confession; Demetrius noticed this and demanded to be executed anyway, also ignoring the judge's own desire to let him go. Finally, Demetrius was taken to the local market (reportedly, he cheerfully sang Christian hymns in his way), and publicly executed by beheading; despite orders to be burned, his severed head and body were hidden and preserved by local Christians as relics.
