= Gospić concentration camp =

NDH concentration camp

- Concentration camp
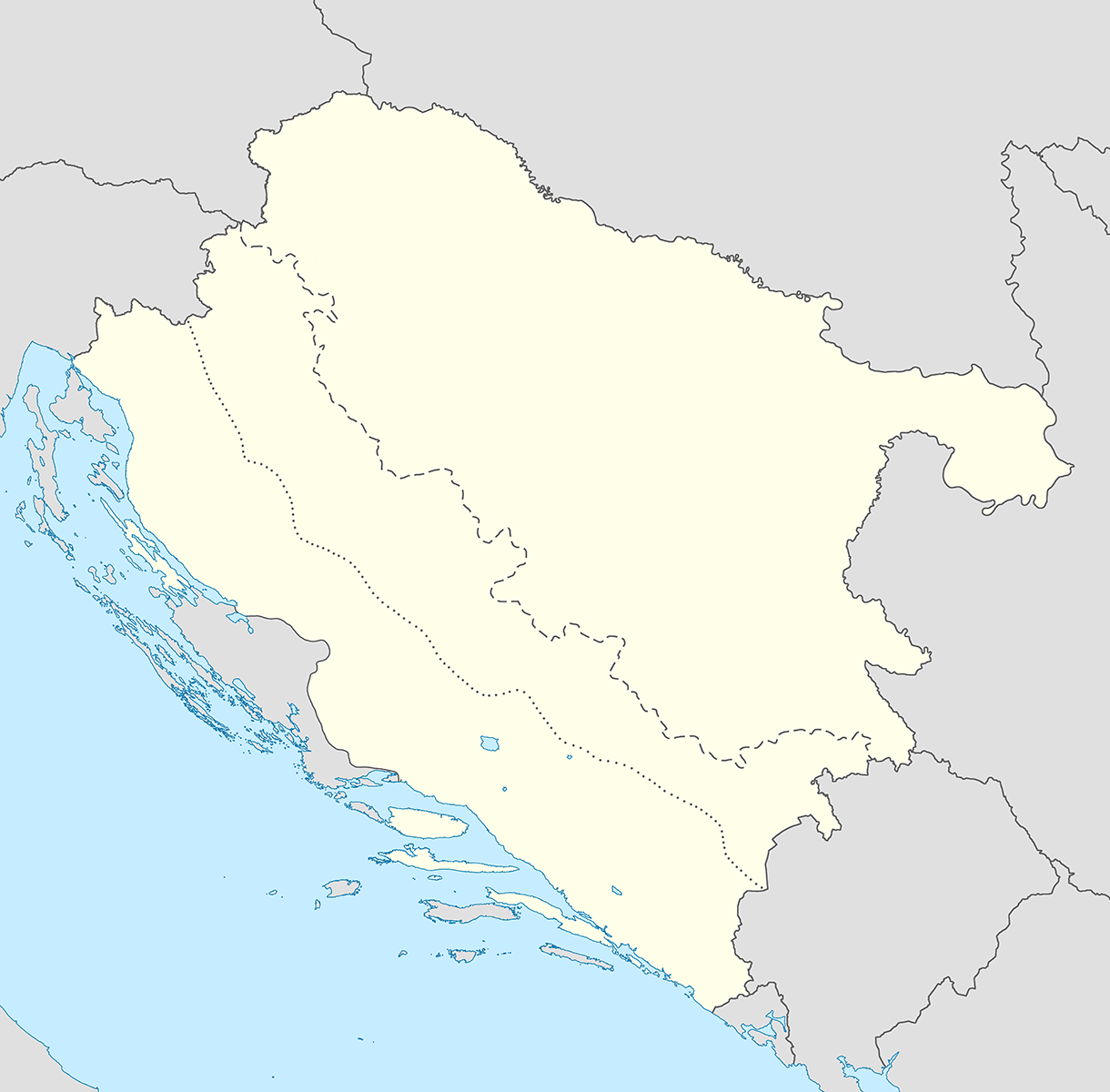
- Location within NDH
- Coordinates: 44.546°N 15.375°E
- Commandant: Jozo Rukavina
- Original use: prison
- Operational: June — August 1941
- Inmates: Predominantly Serbs with several thousands of Jews and some Croats
- Killed: Totally in whole complex which also included Velebit and Pag: 24,000 people according to estimations of Croatian published sources; 42,246 according to Đuro Zatezalo whose figures can be considered as universally agreed according to Raphael Israeli

The Gospić concentration camp (Croatian: Sabirni logor Gospić; Serbian: Koncentracioni logor Gospić) was one of 26 concentration camps in the Independent State of Croatia during World War II, established in Gospić (modern-day Croatia).

== Establishment ==
It belonged to the complex Gospić group of concentration camps which besides Gospić camp also included Jadovno, Ovčara, Pag (Slana and Metajna). The establishment of this complex of concentration camps marked the beginning of the final phase of the Holocaust in the Independent State of Croatia, mass murders.

The Gospić concentration camp was established in May 1941 in the building which was used as a prison before World War II and organized by Jozo Rukavina. The first transport of inmates from Danica concentration camp was organized on 30 June 1941. The prison in Gospić was placed in a large square building which equal sides of 130 meters. It was erected in 1878 and used as a prison for prisoners sentenced to life imprisonment.

== Inmates ==
Based on the orders issued by Ustaše command in Zagreb on 19 July 1941, notable Serbs were captured and sent to the Gospić concentration camp divided into small groups of 20 to 30. The Serbs, Jews and Romani people were captured all over the territory of the Independent State of Croatia and transported to Gospić concentration camp at daily rate of three hundred.

On 1 August 1941 Ustaše transported the first group of Jews from Visoko in Bosnia and Herzegovina to Gospić camp.

About 300 women and children were transported on 11 March 1944 from Gospić to Jasenovac where they were all killed.

== Aftermath ==
The Jasenovac concentration camp was founded as an extension of the disestablished Gospic and Jadovnik camps. The first inmates of Jasenovac camp were brought from Gospić concentration camp in period 19—21 August 1941.

== Sources ==
- Avramov, Smilja (1995). Genocide in Yugoslavia. BIGZ. ISBN 9788613007982.
- Albahari, Nisim (1977). Sarajevo u revoluciji: Komunistička partija Jugoslavije u pripremama i organizaciji ustanka. Istorijski arhiv.
- Bulajić, Milan (1994). The Role of the Vatican in the break-up of the Yugoslav State: The Mission of the Vatican in the Independent State of Croatia. Ustashi Crimes of Genocide. Belgrade: Stručna knjiga.
- Bulajić, Milan (2002). Jasenovac: The Jewish-Serbian Holocaust (the role of the Vatican) in Nazi-Ustasha Croatia (1941-1945). Belgrade: Fund for Genocide Research, Stručna knjiga. ISBN 9788641902211.
- Bulajić, Milan (2006). Jasenovac-1945-2005/06: 60/61.-godišnjica herojskog proboja zatočenika 22. aprila 1945 : dani sećanja na žrtve genocida nad jermenskim, grčkim, srpskim, jevrejskim i romskim narodima. Pešić i sinovi. ISBN 978-86-7540-069-1.
- Dedijer, Vladimir (1981). Novi prilozi za biografiju Josipa Broza Tita. Liburnija.
- Gilbert, Martin (1982). The Macmillan atlas of the Holocaust. Macmillan. ISBN 978-0-02-543380-9.
- Israeli, Raphael (19 February 2013). The Death Camps of Croatia: Visions and Revisions, 1941-1945. Transaction Publishers. ISBN 978-1-4128-4975-3.
- Jacobs, Steven L., ed. (2009). Confronting Genocide: Judaism, Christianity, Islam. Lexington Books. ISBN 9780739135891.
- Komisija (2000). Zločini u logoru Jasenovac. Besjeda. ISBN 9788674920022.
- Zavod (2006). Historijski Zbornik. Nakladni Zavod Hrvatske.
