= August 30 (Eastern Orthodox liturgics) =

Day in the Eastern Orthodox liturgical calendar

Eastern Orthodox liturgical calendar
August 29	August 30	August 31
August 30 O.S. ≍ September 12 N.S. August 30 N.S ≍ August 17 O.S.

An Eastern Orthodox cross

August 30 in Eastern Orthodox liturgical calendars is a feast day and a day of commemoration of saints and martyrs. Although some Orthodox churches use the Revised Julian Calendar and others use the traditional Julian calendar, the fixed commemorations for their respective August 30 are broadly the same, no matter which calendar is used. (Note: Despite the dates being the same, the days to which they refer typically differ by 13 days. The notation Old Style or O.S. is sometimes used to indicate a date in the traditional Julian Calendar (the "Old Calendar"). The notation New Style or N.S. indicates a date in the Revised Julian calendar (the "New Calendar").)

== Feasts ==
- Afterfeast of the Beheading of St. John the Baptist.

== Saints ==
- Hieromartyr Philonidis (Philoneidis) of Cyprus (3rd century). (see also: June 17)
- 6 Martyrs of Melitene, by drowning.
- 16 Monk-martyrs of Thebes, by the sword.
- Saint Bryaene of Nisibis (318)
- Saints Alexander (340), John VIII of Constantinople (595), and Paul the New (784), Archbishops of Constantinople and Ecumenical Patriarchs.
- The Venerable Guardian (Grk.: Ὁ Ὅσιος Φύλαξ). (Note: He is unknown in the Synaxaristes. He is recorded in the Jerusalemitic Codex 1096 p.123 as follows: "Memory of the blessed Patriarchs Alexander, John and Paul the New, and the Blessed Guardian" (see Dimitrievsky, Typica B, p. 55).)
- Venerable Sarmata of "The Paradise", ascetic of the desert, Egypt (c. 362)
- Saint Eulalius, Bishop of Cyprus (4th century)
- Saint Christopher of Palestine (Christopher the Roman, in Palestine) (6th century)

== Pre-Schism Western saints ==
- Saints Boniface and Thecla, parents of the Twelve Brothers commemorated on September 1 (c. 250) (Note: They were martyred under Maximian in Hadrumetum, now Soussa in Tunisia in North Africa.)
- Hieromartyr Felix, (Note: "At Rome, on the Ostian road, the martyrdom of the blessed priest Felix, under the emperors Diocletian and Maximian. After being racked he was sentenced to death, and as they led him to execution, he met a man who spontaneously declared himself a Christian, and was forthwith beheaded with him. The Christians not knowing his name, called him Adauctus, because he was added to St. Felix and shared his crown.") (Note: Felix and Adauctus: Martyrs beheaded in Rome under Diocletian. St Felix was a priest and as he was being led to execution, a bystander confessed Christ and was martyred with him. Because this second martyr's name was not known, he was called Adauctus, i.e., the one added. They were buried on the Ostian Way.) and Martyrs Fortunatus, Septiminus and Januarius, by beheading (c. 304)
- Saint Pammachius, a Roman senator, married to one of the daughters of St Paula (c. 340-410) (Note: On the death of his wife in 395, Pammachius became a monk and spent the rest of his life and his immense wealth in the service of the sick and the poor.)
- Saint Loarn, a disciple of St Patrick of Ireland (5th century)
- Saint Rumon, a bishop and patron-saint of Tavistock in England (6th century) (Note: "ST. RUMON, or RUAN, was a native of Ireland, and a bishop, it is said, who came to Cornwall to end his days in holy solitude. He chose a cell in a certain forest in Cornwall, which then abounded in wild beasts. In this spot he devoted himself to his pious practices, and in God's good time was called to his heavenly reward. About the year 981, when Duke Ordulph had completed the monastery at Tavistock which his father had begun, the relics of St. Rumon were solemnly translated to that church, and were there nobly enshrined. He was regarded with great veneration, as one of the special patrons of that foundation. St Ruan in Cornwall is near the Lizard Point, and several churches in the parish or neighbourhood are dedicated in his honour, as also the Church of Romans Leigh, in Worcestershire. Malmesbury saw the shrine of the Saint at Tavistock, but could learn no particulars of his life." Romansleigh in Devon is named after him.)
- Saint Agilus (Ail, Aile, Aisle, Ayeul) (c. 580-650) (Note: A young nobleman who became a monk with St Columbanus at Luxeuil. He remained at Luxeuil under the founder's successor, St Eustace, but went with him in 612 to preach in Bavaria. On his return to France he became Abbot of Rebais near Paris.)
- Saint Fiacrius (Fiacre, Fiaker, Fèvre), Irish hermit and hospice-founder at Breuil in Brie (c. 670)
- Saints Pelagius, Arsenius and Sylvanus, hermits near Burgos in Old Castile in Spain, martyred by the Saracens. (c. 950)
- Venerable Fantinus of Calabria, the Wonderworker, in Thessalonica (974) (Note: A monk in Calabria in Italy and Abbot of St Mercurius. He was already old when his monastery was destroyed by the Saracens.)
- Saint Bononius, Abbot of Lucedio in Piedmont (1026)
- Saint Peter of Trevi, he preached to the peasants of Tivoli, Anagni and Subiaco (c. 1050)

== Post-Schism Orthodox saints ==
- Synaxis of Serbian Hierarchs:
  - Saints Sava I (1235), Arsenius (1266), Sava II (1271), Eustathius I (1285), James (1292), Nicodemus (1325), and Daniel II (1338), Archbishops;
  - Saints Ioannicius II (1354), Spyridon (1388), Ephraim II (1395), Cyril (1419), Nicon (c. 1439), Macarius (1574), and Gabriel I (1659), Patriarchs;
  - St. Gregory (1012), Bishop.
- Saint Alexander, Abbot of Vocha Monastery, near Galich (14th-15th century)
- Repose of St. Alexander, Abbot of Svir (1533)
- Saint Varlaam, Metropolitan of Moldavia (1657) (Note: He fought for the national and religious rights of Romanian Transylvanians and advocated for the enlightenment of and friendship with Russia. He wrote several apologetic works in defense of Orthodoxy. His name is associated with the beginning of the written tradition of the Romanian language.)
- Saint Ioannicius (Rudniev), Metropolitan of Kiev and Galich (1900) (Note: See: (in Russian) Иоанникий (Руднев). Википе́дия. (Russian Wikipedia).) (see also: June 7)

=== New martyrs and confessors ===
- New Hieromartyr Peter, Priest (1918)
- New Hieromartyr Paul, Priest and Virgin-martyr Elizaveta, and Martyr Theodore (1937)
- New Hieromartyr Ignatius (Lebedev), Schema-Archimandrite of the Vysokopetrovsky Monastery (St. Peter’s Monastery), Moscow (1938) (Note: See: Игнатий (Лебедев). Википедии. Russian Wikipedia.)
- New Hiero-confessor Peter Cheltsov, Archpriest, of Smolensk (1972)

== Other commemorations ==
- Uncovering of the relics (1652) of St. Daniel, great prince of Moscow (1303)
- Translation of the relics (1724) of St. Alexander Nevsky (Alexis in schema), great prince of Novgorod (1263)
- Translation of the relics of St. Guthlac, Hieromonk of Crowland. (see also: April 11)

== Icon gallery ==
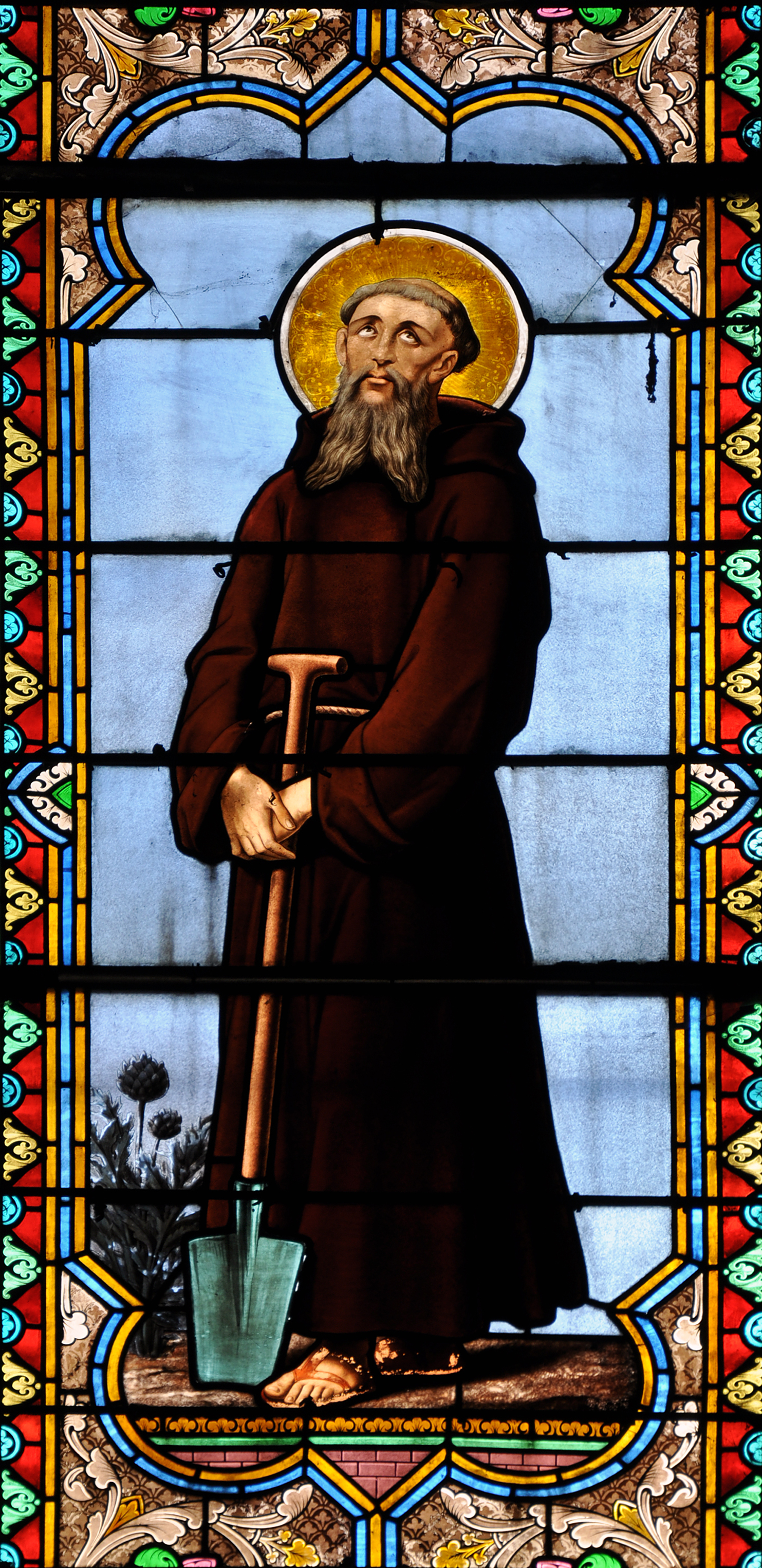
Saint Fiacrius.

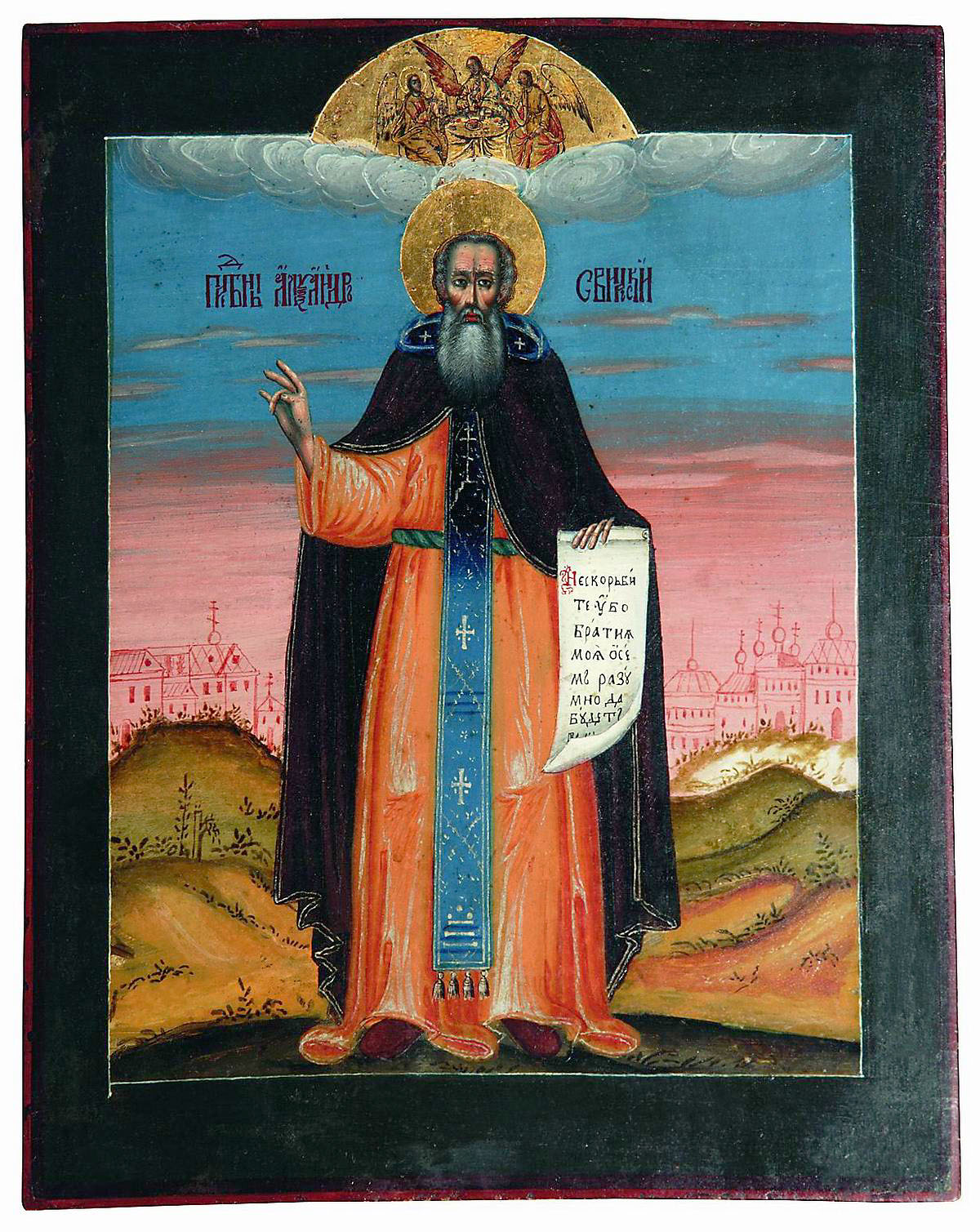
18th century icon of Alexander Svirsky.

== Sources ==
- September 12/August 30. Orthodox Calendar (PRAVOSLAVIE.RU).
- September 12 / August 30. HOLY TRINITY RUSSIAN ORTHODOX CHURCH (A parish of the Patriarchate of Moscow).
- August 30. OCA - The Lives of the Saints.
- The Autonomous Orthodox Metropolia of Western Europe and the Americas (ROCOR). St. Hilarion Calendar of Saints for the year of our Lord 2004. St. Hilarion Press (Austin, TX). p. 64.
- August 30. Latin Saints of the Orthodox Patriarchate of Rome.
- The Roman Martyrology. Transl. by the Archbishop of Baltimore. Last Edition, According to the Copy Printed at Rome in 1914. Revised Edition, with the Imprimatur of His Eminence Cardinal Gibbons. Baltimore: John Murphy Company, 1916. p. 263.

Greek Sources

- Great Synaxaristes: (in Greek) 30 ΑΥΓΟΥΣΤΟΥ. ΜΕΓΑΣ ΣΥΝΑΞΑΡΙΣΤΗΣ.
- (in Greek) Συναξαριστής. 30 Αυγούστου. ECCLESIA.GR. (H ΕΚΚΛΗΣΙΑ ΤΗΣ ΕΛΛΑΔΟΣ).

Russian Sources

- (in Russian) 12 сентября (30 августа). Православная Энциклопедия под редакцией Патриарха Московского и всея Руси Кирилла (электронная версия). (Orthodox Encyclopedia - Pravenc.ru).
- (in Russian) 30 августа по старому стилю / 12 сентября по новому стилю. Русская Православная Церковь - Православный церковный календарь на 2026 год.
