= April 30 (Eastern Orthodox liturgics) =

Day in the Eastern Orthodox liturgical calendar

Eastern Orthodox liturgical calendar
| April 29 | April 30 | May 1 |
April 30 O.S. ≍ May 13 N.S. April 30 N.S ≍ April 17 O.S.

An Eastern Orthodox cross

April 30 in Eastern Orthodox liturgical calendars is a feast day and a day of commemoration of saints and martyrs. Although some Orthodox churches use the Revised Julian Calendar and others use the traditional Julian calendar, the fixed commemorations for their respective April 30 are broadly the same, no matter which calendar is used. (Note: Despite the dates being the same, the days to which they refer typically differ by 13 days. The notation Old Style or O.S. is sometimes used to indicate a date in the traditional Julian Calendar (the "Old Calendar"). The notation New Style or N.S. indicates a date in the Revised Julian calendar (the "New Calendar").)

== Saints ==
- Holy Apostle James (44), the brother of St. John the Theologian.
- Hieromartyr Maximus, at Ephesus, during the persecution of Decius. (Note: "At Ephesus, St. Maximus, martyr, who was crowned in the persecution of Decius.")
- Hieromartyr Aphrodisius, and 30 martyrs, at Alexandria. (Note: "At Alexandria, the holy martyrs Aphrodisius, priest, and thirty others.")
- Saint Donatus, Bishop of Euroea in Epirus (387) (Note: "At Evorea, in Epirus, St. Donatus, a bishop, who was eminent for sanctity in the time of the emperor Theodosius.")
- Saint Clement the Hymnographer, abbot of the Studion (9th century)

== Pre-Schism Western saints ==
- Martyr Sophia of Fermo (c. 250) (Note: "At Fermo, in the Marches, St. Sophia, virgin and martyr.")
- Martyrs Marianus, James and Companions, at Lambaesis, an ancient town in Numidia in North Africa (259) (Note: "At Lambesa, in Numidia, the birthday of the holy martyrs Marian, lector, and James, deacon. The former, after having successfully endured vexations for the confession of Christ, in the persecution of Decius, was again arrested with his illustrious companion, and both being subjected to severe and cruel torments, during which they were twice miraculously comforted from heaven, finally fell by the sword with many others.")
- Martyrs Eutropius and Estelle, of Saintes (Gaul) (3rd century) (Note: "At Saintes, blessed Eutropius, bishop and martyr, who was consecrated bishop and sent to Gaul by St. Clement. After preaching for many years, he had his skull crushed for bearing testimony to Christ, and thus gained a victory by his death.")
- Saint Quintian and Saint Atticus
- Hieromartyr Laurence, at Novara, and some boys whom he was teaching (397) (Note: "At Novara, the martyrdom of the holy priest Lawrence, and some boys, whom he was educating.")
- Saint Pomponius of Naples, Bishop of Naples in Italy (508–536) and a strong opponent of Arianism (536)
- Saint Desideratus of Gourdon, hermit (c. 569)
- Saint Cynwl of Wales, Hermit, brother of Saint Deiniol and first Bishop of Bangor (6th century)
- Saint Erconwald, Bishop of London (693) (Note: "At London, in England, St. Erconwald, a bishop celebrated for many miracles.")
- Saint Swithbert the Younger, Bishop of Werden in Westphalia (807)
- Martyrs Amator, Peter and Louis (Ludovicus) of Cordoba, Spain, by the Emirate for blaspheming Islam (855) (Note: "At Cordova, the holy martyrs Amator, priest, Peter, monk, and Lewis." They are referred to as "Amator, Peter and Louis" (+855) in Western sources.)
- Martyrs Isidore, Elias and Paul of Cordoba, Spain, by the Moors (856) (Note: Elias, Paul and Isidore (SS.) MM. (April 17) (9th century): "St. Elias was a priest venerable for age and virtue, who together with Paul and Isidore, two young Christians, his spiritual children, suffered for Christ (A.D. 856) at Cordova in Spain in the persecution under the Caliph Mohammed. St. Eulogius makes special mention of them in his History of the Times.") (see also: April 17)
- Saint Forannan, Abbot of Waulsort Abbey in Belgium (982)

== Post-Schism Orthodox saints ==
- Saint Simon, Metropolitan of Moscow (1511)
- Schema-abbess Martha Protasieva, disciple of Saint Paisius Velichkovsky (1813)
- Saint Ignatius Brianchaninov, Bishop of the Caucasus and Stavropol (1867)

=== Icons ===
- Icon of the Most Holy Theotokos "Of the Passion" (1641) (Note: Known in the West as “Our Lady of Perpetual Help”.)

== Other commemorations ==
- Uncovering of the relics of Saint Basil of Amasea, Bishop (322)
- Uncovering of the relics (1558) of Saint Nicetas of Novgorod, bishop (1108)
- Uncovering of the relics (1725) of New martyr Argyra of Prussa (1721)
- Repose of Schema-Abbess Martha (Protasieva) (1813), disciple of St. Paisius (Velichkovsky).
- Repose of Hieromonk Clement (Sederholm) of Optina Monastery (1878)
- Slaying of Priest Igor Rozin of Tyrnyauz, Kabardino-Balkar Republic, Russia (2001)

== Icon gallery ==
Apostle James the Great.
King Herod Agrippa I killed James with a sword (Acts 12:2).
(Menologion of Basil II, 10th century).

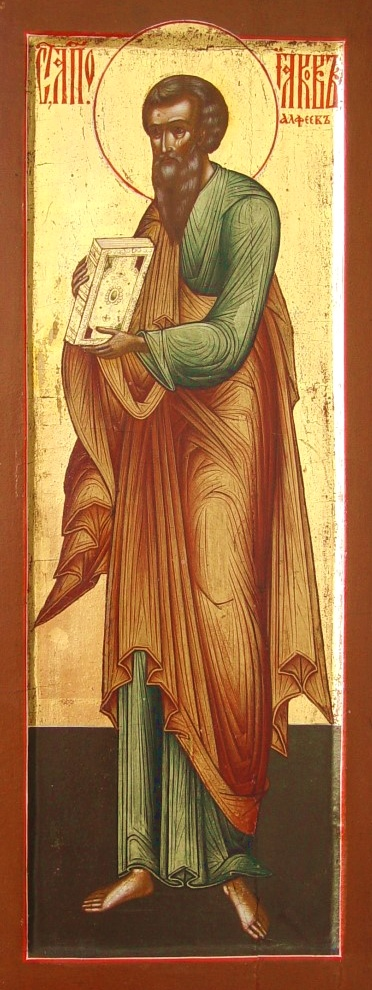
Apostle James the Great.

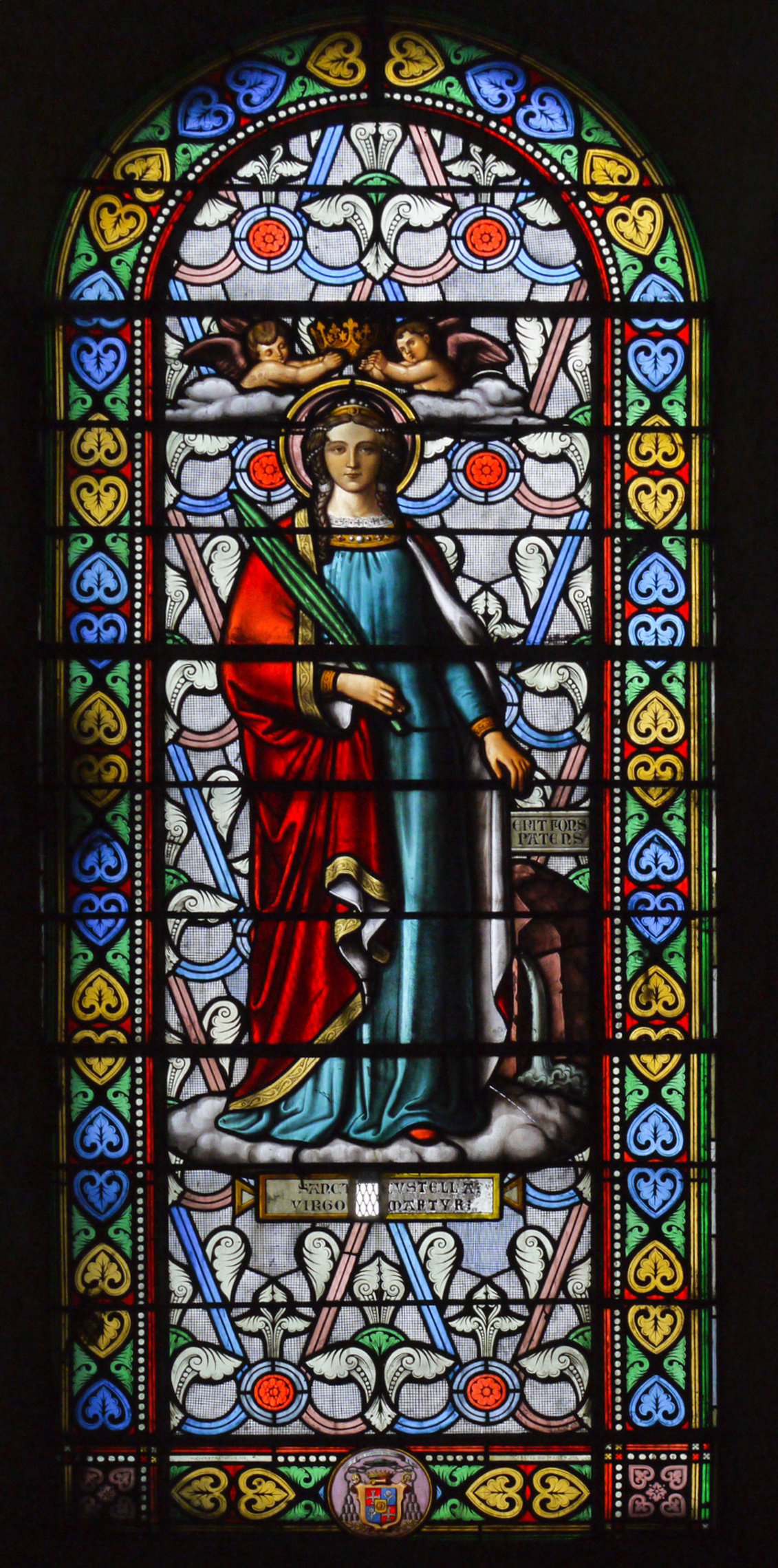
St. Estelle (Basilique Saint-Eutrope, Saintes, France).

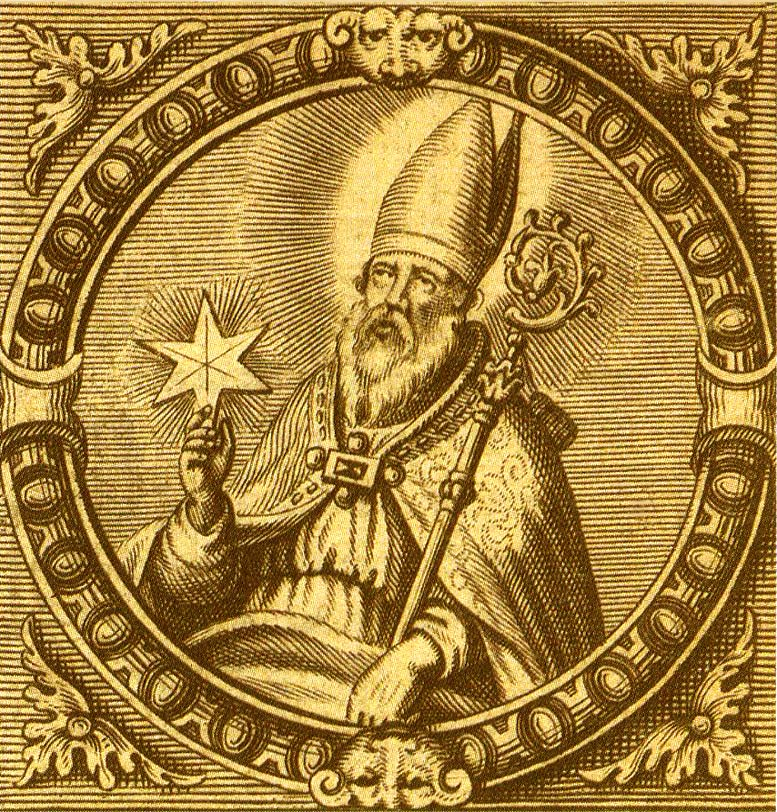
Saint Swithbert the Younger.

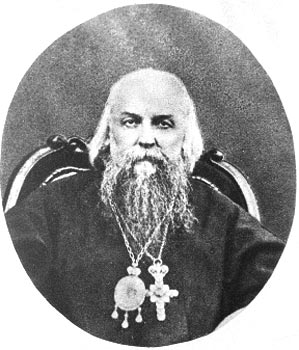
St. Ignatius Bryanchaninov.

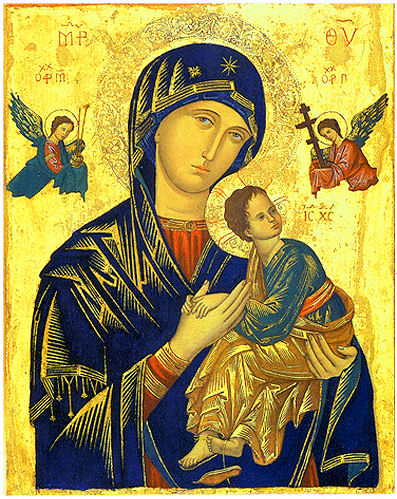
Icon of the Most Holy Theotokos "Of the Passion".

== Sources ==
- April 30/May 13. Orthodox Calendar (Pravoslavie.ru).
- May 13, 2011 / April 30. Holy Trinity Russian Orthodox Church (A parish of the Patriarchate of Moscow).
- April 30. OCA - The Lives of the Saints.
- April 30. Latin Saints of the Orthodox Patriarchate of Rome.
- The Roman Martyrology. Transl. by the Archbishop of Baltimore. Last Edition, According to the Copy Printed at Rome in 1914. Revised Edition, with the Imprimatur of His Eminence Cardinal Gibbons. Baltimore: John Murphy Company, 1916. pp. 121–122.
- Rev. Richard Stanton. A Menology of England and Wales, or, Brief Memorials of the Ancient British and English Saints Arranged According to the Calendar, Together with the Martyrs of the 16th and 17th Centuries. London: Burns & Oates, 1892. pp. 186–189.

Greek Sources

- Great Synaxaristes: (in Greek) 30 Απριλίου, Μέγας Συναξαριστής.
- (in Greek) Συναξαριστής. 30 Απριλίου. Ecclesia.gr. (H Εκκλησία της Ελλάδος).

Russian Sources

- (in Russian) 13 мая (30 апреля). Православная Энциклопедия под редакцией Патриарха Московского и всея Руси Кирилла (электронная версия). (Orthodox Encyclopedia - Pravenc.ru).
- (in Russian) 30 апреля (ст.ст.) 13 мая 2013 (нов. ст.). Русская Православная Церковь Отдел внешних церковных связей. (DECR).
