= Danilo II (Serbian Archbishop) =

Serbian Archbishop 1324 to 1337

Saint Danilo II Serbian Archbishop
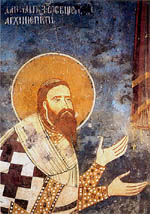

Archbishop of All Serbia and Serbian Maritime Lands
- Church: Serbian Orthodox Church
- See: Patriarchate of Peć Monastery
- Installed: 1324
- Term ended: 1337
- Predecessor: Nikodim I
- Successor: Joanikije II

Personal details
- Denomination: Eastern Orthodoxy

Sainthood
- Feast day: 2 January [O.S. 20 December]
- Canonized: by Serbian Orthodox Church

Danilo II (Serbian Cyrillic: Данило II) was the Serbian Archbishop 1324 to 1337, under the rule of Kings Stephen Uroš III (1321–1331) and Stefan Dušan (1331–1355, crowned Emperor in 1345). As a Serbian monk, he was also a chronicler, active in court and Church politics, holding the office during the zenith of the Nemanjić dynasty-era; he wrote many biographies which are considered part of the most notable medieval Serbian literature. He was proclaimed Saint Danilo II (Свети Данило II) of the Serbian Orthodox Church and is celebrated on the same day as Saint Ignatius of Antioch on 2 January [O.S. 20 December].

== Life and work ==
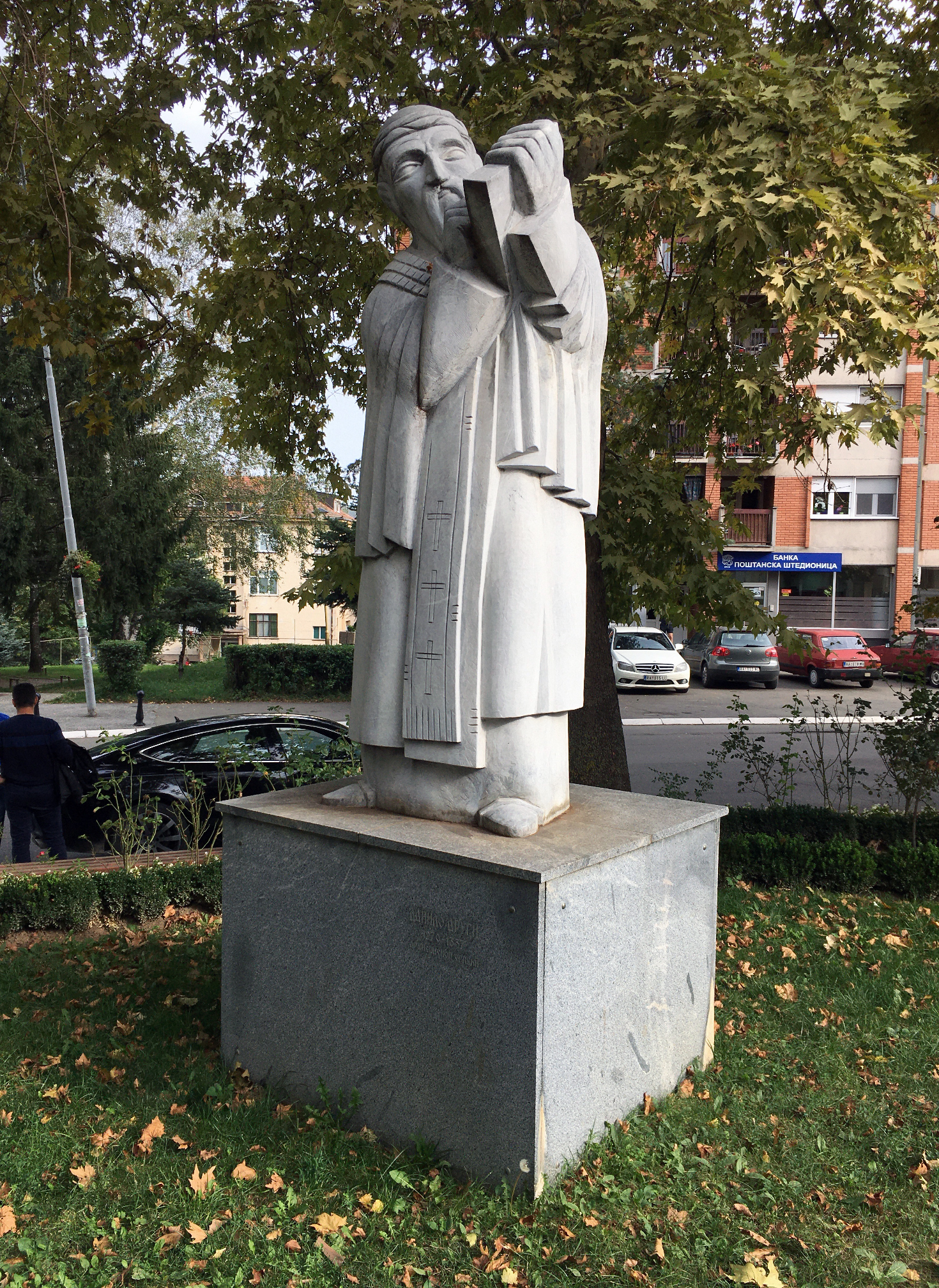
Monument dedicated to Danilo II in Raška

Born around 1270 in the župa of Pilot (present-day Pult, in northern Albania), his given name has not been recorded, only that he belonged to a Serbian noble family. He was endowed with a fine intellect and a noble disposition; he had received an excellent education at the hands of the most learned men in Medieval Serbia and in Byzantium. After his education, he joined the court of the Serbian king Stefan Milutin, which he left around 1300 to join the monastery of Končul on the Ibar river. After his novitiate, he went to Peć at the request of the Serbian archbishop Jevstatije, where he was made a presbyter priest. After that, he progressed quickly in the ecclesiastical hierarchy of the Serbian Orthodox Church: first as abbot of Hilandar (c. 1306–1311), then as bishop of Banjska (1312–1315), and finally as archbishop from 1324 until his death in 1337. He died on 19 December 1337 and was buried in one of the churches he had built in the monastery of Peć, Our Lady Hodegetria.

Danilo wrote biographies of Serbian medieval kings and archbishops, including the biography of Jelena, the wife of King Stephen Uroš I of Serbia (1243–1276). His monumental work is referred to in the poetry of Serbian folklore as knjige starostavne (the ancient books) and knjige carostavne (the royal books). As a result of his work, many historical details concerning both the rulers of medieval Serbia and the members of the Nemanjić dynasty have been preserved.

== Legacy ==
He is included in The 100 most prominent Serbs book.

== See also ==
- List of saints of the Serbian Orthodox Church
- List of heads of the Serbian Orthodox Church

Eastern Orthodox Church titles
Preceded by Nikodim I	Serbian Archbishop; 1324–1337	Succeeded by Joanikije II

== Sources ==
- Episkop šumadijski Sava (2001) [1996]. "Sveti Danilo II arhiepiskop srpski". Srpski jerarsi od IX do XX veka (in Serbian). Projekat Rastko. Archived from the original on 2015-04-02.
- Лопандић, Душко (2009). "Архиепископ српски Данило II" (in Serbian). Politikin zabavnik. Archived from the original on 2014-06-04.
- Justin Sp Popović (1976). Žitija svetih (in Serbian). Izdanje Manastire sv. Ćelije kod Valjeva.
- McDaniel, Gordon Lawrence (13 June 1980). The "Lives of the Serbian Kings and Archbishops by Danilo II": Textual History and Criticism (PhD). University of Washington.
- Thomson, Francis J. (1993). "Archbishop Daniel II of Serbia Hierarch, Hagiographer, Saint. With Some Comments on the Vitae regum et archiepiscoporum Serbiae and the Cults of Mediaeval Serbian Saints". Analecta Bollandiana. 111 (1–2): 103–134. doi:10.1484/J.ABOL.4.03279.
