= April 17 (Eastern Orthodox liturgics) =

Day in the Eastern Orthodox liturgical calendar

Eastern Orthodox liturgical calendar
April 16	April 17	April 18
April 17 O.S. ≍ April 30 N.S. April 17 N.S ≍ April 4 O.S.

An Eastern Orthodox cross

April 17 in Eastern Orthodox liturgical calendars is a feast day and a day of commemoration of saints and martyrs. Although some Orthodox churches use the Revised Julian Calendar and others use the traditional Julian calendar, the fixed commemorations for their respective April 17 are broadly the same, no matter which calendar is used. (Note: Despite the dates being the same, the days to which they refer typically differ by 13 days. The notation Old Style or O.S. is sometimes used to indicate a date in the traditional Julian Calendar (the "Old Calendar"). The notation New Style or N.S. indicates a date in the Revised Julian calendar (the "New Calendar").)

== Saints ==
- Hieromartyr Anicetus, Pope of Rome (166) (Note: A Syrian by descent, he was Bishop of Rome from about 152 till 166. During this period St Polycarp of Smyrna visited Rome to settle with him the question of the date of Easter. Anicetus took a firm stand against the Gnostics and may have been martyred.)
- Martyr Adrian of Corinth, in Persia (251)
- Hieromartyr Symeon (Shemon Bar Sabbae), Bishop in Persia, and those with him (341):

- Hieromartyrs Abdechalas and Ananias, priests;
- Martyrs Chusdazat (Usphazanes) and Azat, the eunuchs;
- Fusicus, the dignitary and Ascitrea, his daughter, and 1,150 (or 1,250 or 1,515) others.

- Saint Acacius II, Bishop of Melitene (435) (Note: He should not be confused with St Acacius the Confessor (March 31), who was also a bishop of Melitene.) (see also: April 18)
- Saint Agapitus I, Pope of Rome (536) (see also: September 20; April 22 - West)
- Saint Ephraim the Great, Bishop of Atsquri, Georgia (9th century) (see also: April 15)

== Pre-Schism Western saints ==
- Martyrs Mappalicus and Companions, in Carthage under Decius (250) (Note: "In Africa, the birthday of blessed Mappalicus, and many others who were crowned with martyrdom, as is related by St. Cyprian in his epistle to the Martyrs and Confessors.")
- Martyrs Fortunatus and Marcian.
- Saint Innocent of Tortona, Bishop of Tortona and Confessor (350) (Note: A confessor under Diocletian, he was scourged and just escaped death. He was later ordained priest and became Bishop of Tortona in Italy (c 326).) (Note: See: (in Italian) Innocenzo di Tortona. Wikipedia. (Italian Wikipedia).)
- Saint Pantagathus, a courtier who later became Bishop of Vienne in France (540)
- Saint Villicus, a very virtuous Bishop of Metz in France 543-568 (568)
- Monk-martyr Donnán of Eigg and those with him, in Scotland (618) (Note: St Donnán was a monk at Iona with St Columba and founded a monastery on the Island of Eigg in the Inner Hebrides, off the west coast of Scotland. He and his fifty-two monks were massacred by heathen raiders on Easter Sunday 618.)
- Saint Landericus (Landry of Metz), Bishop of Meaux, then Abbot of Soignies (7th century)
- Saint Wando (Vando), monk and Abbot of Fontenelle Abbey in France (c. 756) (Note: As a result of a false accusation he was exiled to Troyes but was reinstated after his innocence had been proved.)
- Martyrs Isidore, Elias and Paul of Cordoba, Spain, by the Moors (856) (Note: Elias, Paul and Isidore (SS.) MM. (April 17) (9th century) "St. Elias was a priest venerable for age and virtue, who together with Paul and Isidore, two young Christians, his spiritual children, suffered for Christ (A.D. 856) at Cordova in Spain in the persecution under the Caliph Mohammed. St. Eulogius makes special mention of them in his History of the Times.") (see also: April 30)

== Post-Schism Orthodox saints ==
- Venerable Zosimas of Solovki (1478)
- Saint Macarios (Notaras) of Corinth (1805)
- Venerable Saints Apostolos (1846) and Theocharis (1829), brothers, of Arta. (Note: They are also commemorated on the Sunday of Myrrh-bearing Women, the second Sunday following Pascha.)
- Venerable Paisius, Fool-for-Christ, of the Kiev Caves (1893)

=== New martyrs and confessors ===
- New Hieromartyr John Prigorovsky of Krasnoyarsk, Priest (1918)
- New Hieromartyr Michael Novitsky, Confessor, Archpriest, of Uzda, Belorussia (1935)
- New Hieromartyr Theodore Nedosekin of Moscow, Priest (1942)

== Other commemorations ==
- Uncovering of the relics (1641) of St. Alexander of Svir, founder of Svir Monastery (1533)
- Repose of Hiero-schema-monk Constantine of Ekaterinburg (1960)

== Icon gallery ==
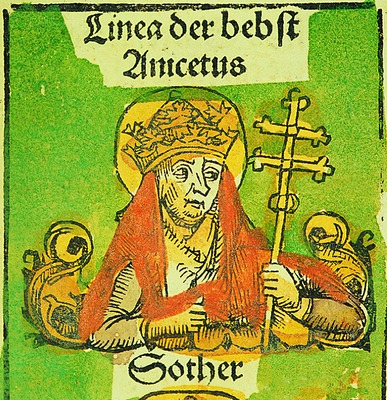
Hieromartyr Anicetus, Pope of Rome.

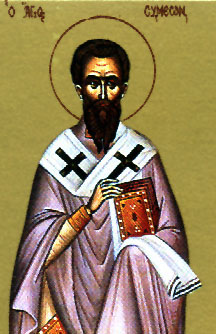
Hieromartyr Symeon (Shemon Bar Sabbae), Bishop in Persia.

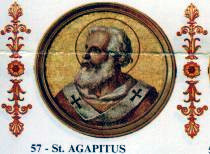
Agapitus I, Pope of Rome

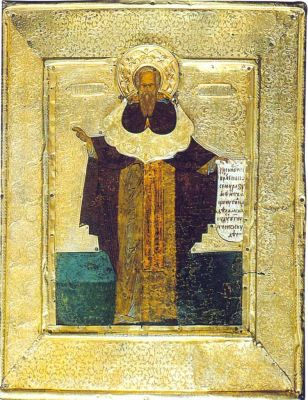
Venerable Zosimas of Solovki.

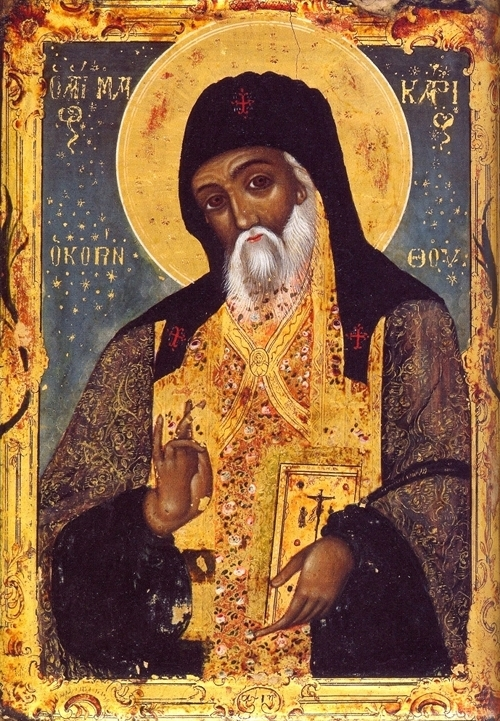
St. Macarios (Notaras) of Corinth.

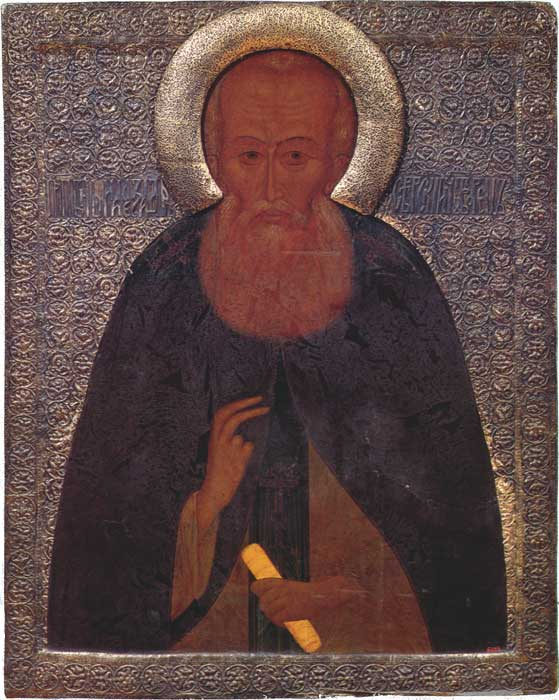
St. Alexander of Svir.

== Sources ==
- April 17 / April 30. Orthodox Calendar (pravoslavie.ru).
- April 30 / April 17. Holy Trinity Russian Orthodox Church (A parish of the Patriarchate of Moscow).
- April 17. OCA - The Lives of the Saints.
- The Autonomous Orthodox Metropolia of Western Europe and the Americas. St. Hilarion Calendar of Saints for the year of our Lord 2004. St. Hilarion Press (Austin, TX). p. 29.
- April 17. Latin Saints of the Orthodox Patriarchate of Rome.
- The Roman Martyrology. Transl. by the Archbishop of Baltimore. Last Edition, According to the Copy Printed at Rome in 1914. Revised Edition, with the Imprimatur of His Eminence Cardinal Gibbons. Baltimore: John Murphy Company, 1916. p. 108.

Greek Sources

- Great Synaxaristes: (in Greek) 17 Απριλίου. Μεγασ Συναξαριστησ.
- (in Greek) Συναξαριστής. 17 Απριλίου. ecclesia.gr. (H Εκκλησια Τησ Ελλαδοσ).

Russian Sources

- (in Russian) 30 апреля (17 апреля). Православная Энциклопедия под редакцией Патриарха Московского и всея Руси Кирилла (электронная версия). (Orthodox Encyclopedia - Pravenc.ru).
- (in Russian) Русская Православная Церковь Православный Церковный календарь на 2023 год.
