= April 18 (Eastern Orthodox liturgics) =

Day in the Eastern Orthodox liturgical calendar

Eastern Orthodox liturgical calendar
April 17	April 18	April 19
April 18 O.S. ≍ May 1 N.S. April 18 N.S ≍ April 5 O.S.

An Eastern Orthodox cross

April 18 in Eastern Orthodox liturgical calendars is a feast day and a day of commemoration of saints and martyrs. Although some Orthodox churches use the Revised Julian Calendar and others use the traditional Julian calendar, the fixed commemorations for their respective April 18 are broadly the same, no matter which calendar is used. (Note: Despite the dates being the same, the days to which they refer typically differ by 13 days. The notation Old Style or O.S. is sometimes used to indicate a date in the traditional Julian Calendar (the "Old Calendar"). The notation New Style or N.S. indicates a date in the Revised Julian calendar (the "New Calendar").)

== Saints ==
- Martyrs Victor, Zoticus, Zeno, Acindynus, and Severian, of Nicomedia (c. 303) (see also: April 20 - Greek)
- Martyr Sabbas the Goth (Sabbas Stratelates), at Buzau in Wallachia (372) (see also: April 12 and April 15)
- Saint Acacius II, Bishop of Melitene (445) (Note: Name days celebrated today include: Akakios (Ἀκάκιος).) (see also: April 17)
- Saint Cosmas, Bishop of Chalcedon, and his fellow-ascetic St. Auxentius (815-820)
- Venerable John the Righteous (John the Hesychast), disciple of St. Gregory of Decapolis (c. 820-850)
- Venerable Naucratius, Abbot of the Studion (848)
- Venerable Athanasia the Wonderworker, Abbess, of Aegina (850) (see also: April 12 - Slavic)
- Venerable Matthew (Matthias), acquaintance of St. Athanasia the Wonderworker (c. 850)
- Venerable Euthymius the Wonderworker.

== Pre-Schism Western saints ==
- Saint Eleutherius, Bishop of Illyria, his mother Anthia, and eleven others, martyred in Illyria under Hadrian (c. 117-138) (Note: "At Messina, the birthday of the holy martyrs, Eleutherius, bishop of Illyricum, and Anthia, his mother. Illustrious by his holiness of life and his power of working miracles, he was, in the reign of Adrian, laid on a bed of red-hot iron, on a gridiron, in a pan filled with boiling oil, pitch and rosin; he was cast to the lions, but, remaining unhurt, he finally had his throat pierced with a sword. His mother suffered a similar punishment.") (see also: December 15 - East)
- Martyr Corebus, a prefect of Messina in Sicily, converted to Christ by St Eleutherius and martyred under the Emperor Hadrian (c. 117-138) (Note: "In the same place, St. Corebus, prefect, who was converted to the faith by St. Eleutherius, and died by the sword.")
- Martyr Calocerus, an officer of the Emperor Hadrian martyred in Brescia in Italy (c. 117-138) (Note: "At Brescia, St. Calocerus, a martyr, who was converted to Christ by Saints Faustinus and Jovita, and under the same Adrian terminated his glorious combat for the confession of the faith.")
- Saint Apollonius the Apologist, a Roman senator, denounced as a Christian by one of his own slaves and condemned to be beheaded (c. 190) (Note: His eloquent defence of Orthodoxy, delivered before the Senate at his trial is a priceless document of the Faith.) (Note: "AT Rome, St. Apollonius, a senator under the emperor Commodus and the prefect Perennius. Having been denounced as a Christian by one of his slaves, and being commanded to give an account of his faith, he composed an able work which he read in the Senate. He was nevertheless decapitated for Christ by the sentence of that body.")
- Saints Bitheus and Genocus, two monks from Britain who accompanied St Finian of Clonard to Ireland (6th century)
- Saint Laserian (Molaisse), founder of the monastery and bishopric of Leighlin in Ireland (639)
- Saint Deicola (Dicul), born in Ireland, he preached Christ in England in Norfolk and in Sussex (late 7th century) (Note: Dickleburgh in Norfolk may be named after him.)
- Saint Agia (Aia, Aya, Austregildis, Aye), wife of St Hidulf of Hainault in Belgium, monastic at the convent of Mons (c. 714)
- Saint Wicterp (Wiho, Wicho), Abbot of Ellwangen Abbey in Germany, later became the tenth Bishop of Augsburg (749) (Note: He helped found monasteries at Fussen, Wessobrunn and Kempten, all of which became famous.)
- Saint Cogitosus, a monk at Kildare in Ireland who probably wrote the Life of St Brigid (8th century)
- Saint Perfectus, a priest in Cordoba in Spain, martyred by Muslims on Easter Sunday (851) (Note: "At Cordova, St. Saint Perfect, priest and martyr, killed by the Moors for inveighing against the followers of Mahomet.")

== Post-Schism Orthodox saints ==
- Venerable Basil (Ratishvili) the Georgian, Wonderworker, of Iveron Monastery, Mt. Athos (13th century)
- Venerable Euthymius the Enlightener of Karelia (1435), and righteous laymen Anthony and Felix of Karelia.
- New Martyr John the Tailor, of Ioannina, at Constantinople (1526)
- Venerable new martyr John (Koulikas) (1564) (see also: April 8)
- Martyr Tunom, Arab Emir who confessed Christ on seeing the Holy Fire in Jerusalem (1579) (Note: "...The oldest edition of these pilgrimage guides, entitled Proskynitarion of the Holy City of Jerusalem, was published in Vienna in 1749 and was written by Symeon, archimandrite and warden of the Holy Sepulchre...The Vienna edition also mentions another incident related to an Arab emir named Tunom, who at the time of the miracle was in the church courtyard. When he saw the igniting of the column he realized the truth of the miracle of the Holy Fire and confessed to his co-religionists the power of Jesus Christ. After he quarreled with them, his confession became the cause of the order for his execution, and subsequently for his body to be burnt. Today he is venerated as an official holy martyr of the Orthodox Church. His memory is celebrated on 18 April and his relics are kept at the monastery of the Virgin Mary, the Megali Panagia, in Jerusalem.")
- Hieromartyr Cyril VI of Constantinople, Ecumenical Patriarch of Constantinople (1821)

=== New martyrs and confessors ===
- New Hieromartyr Bessarion Selinin, Priest (1918)
- New Hieromartyr Alexis Krontenkov, Priest, of Ekaterinburg (1930)
- New Hieromartyrs Nicholas (1937) and Basil Derzhavin (1930), Priests, and martyred lay people of the city of Gorodets, Nizhni-Novgorod.
- New Martyr Tamara (Satsi), Abbess, of Cheboksara (Chuvashia) (1942)

== Other commemorations ==
- Icon of the Most Holy Theotokos "Glykophilousa" ("Sweet-kissing"). (see also: March 27)
- Icon of the Mother of God of St Maximus (Maximovsk Icon) (1299)

== Icon gallery ==
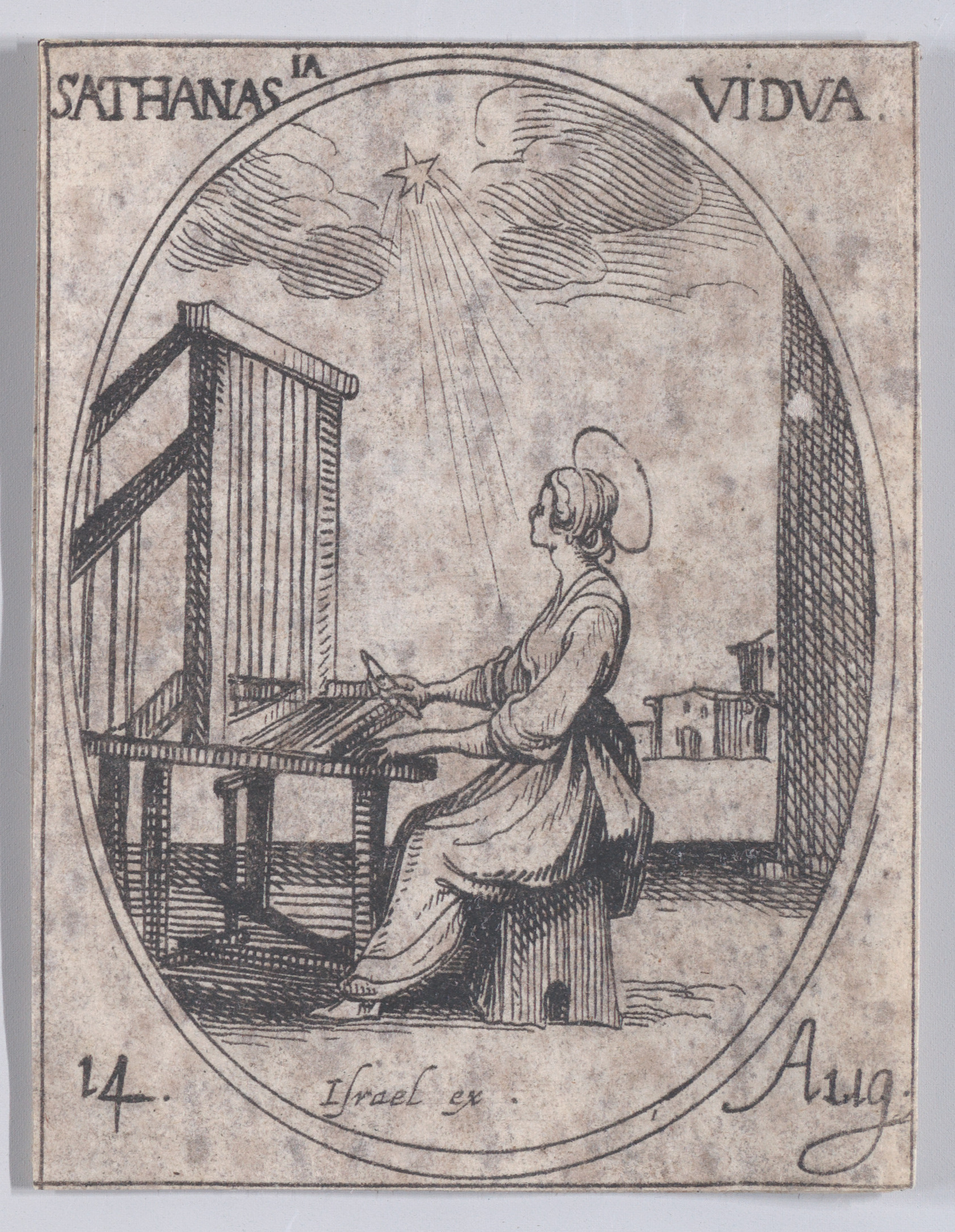
St. Athanasia of Aegina.

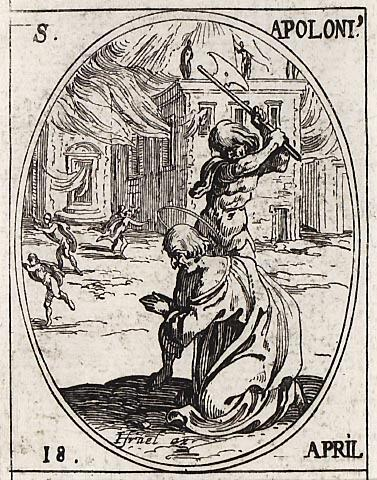
Saint Apollonius of Rome (Jacques Callot, c. 1630).

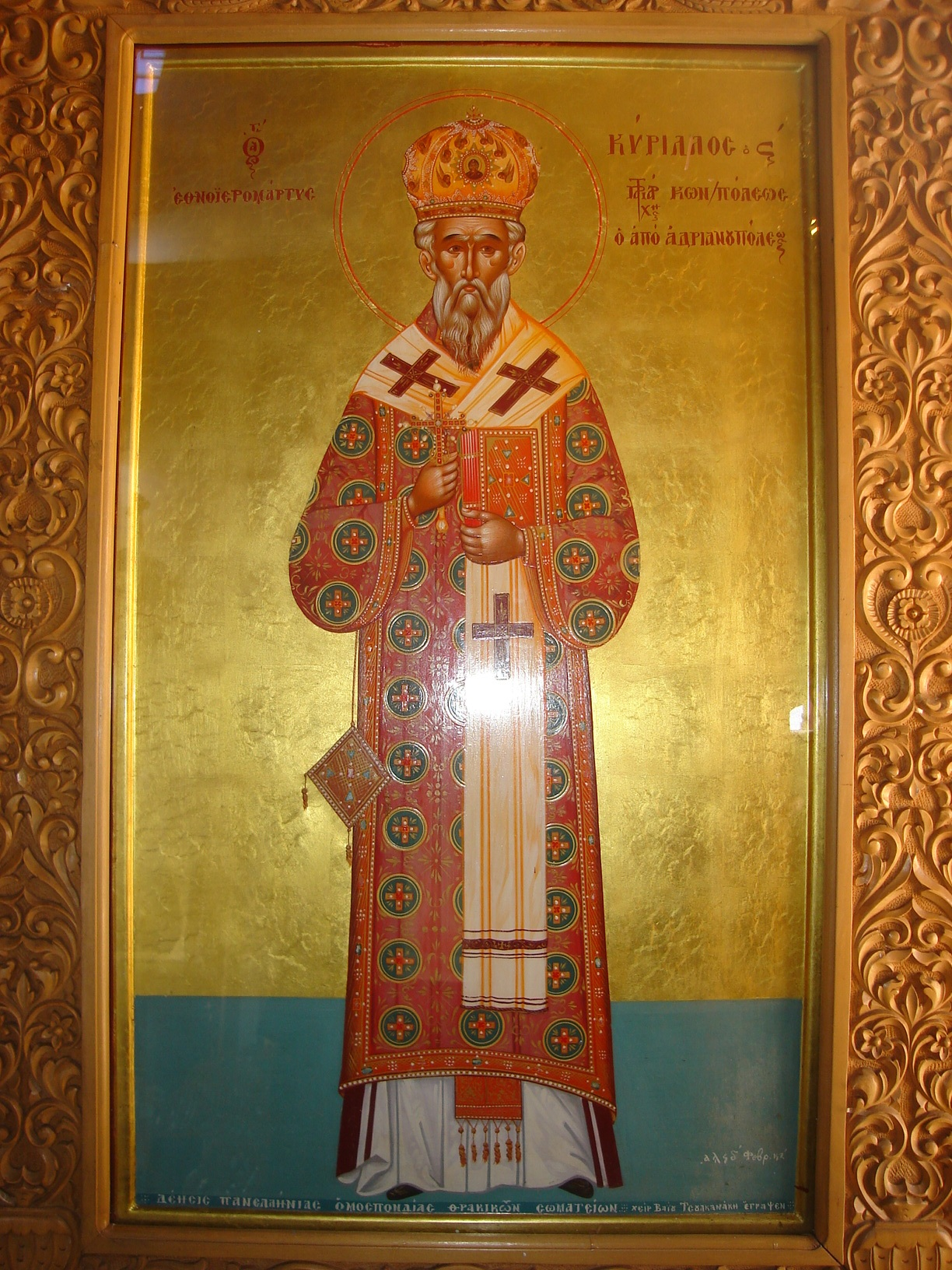
St. Cyril VI, Patriarch of Constantinople.

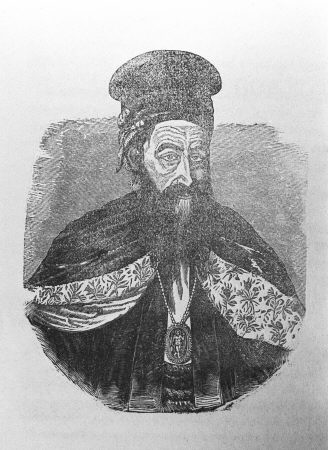
St. Cyril VI, Patriarch of Constantinople.

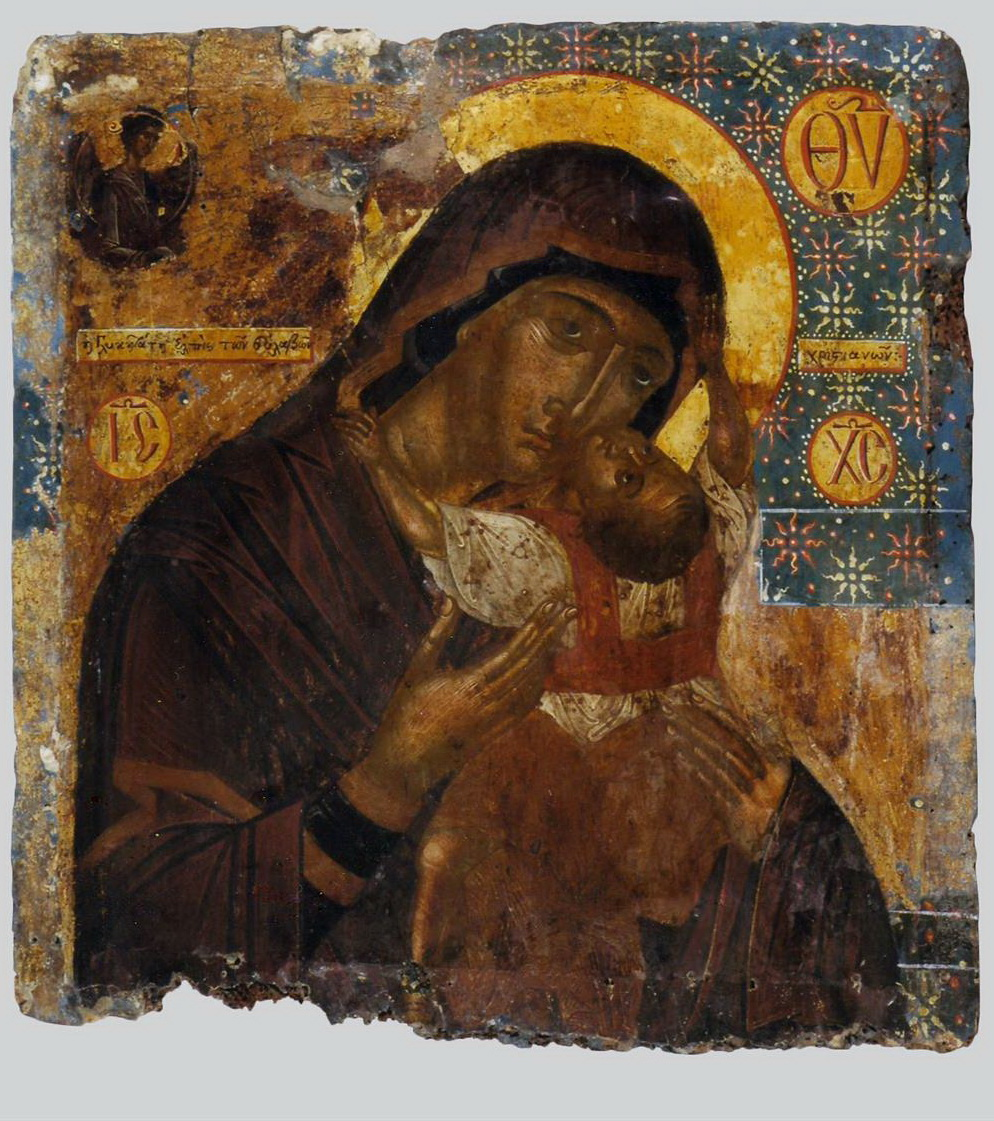
An icon of the Most Holy Theotokos "Glykophilousa"
("Sweet-kissing").

== Sources ==
- April 18 / May 1. Orthodox Calendar (PRAVOSLAVIE.RU).
- May 1 / April 18. HOLY TRINITY RUSSIAN ORTHODOX CHURCH (A parish of the Patriarchate of Moscow).
- April 18. OCA - The Lives of the Saints.
- The Autonomous Orthodox Metropolia of Western Europe and the Americas (ROCOR). St. Hilarion Calendar of Saints for the year of our Lord 2004. St. Hilarion Press (Austin, TX). p. 29.
- April 18. Latin Saints of the Orthodox Patriarchate of Rome.
- The Roman Martyrology. Transl. by the Archbishop of Baltimore. Last Edition, According to the Copy Printed at Rome in 1914. Revised Edition, with the Imprimatur of His Eminence Cardinal Gibbons. Baltimore: John Murphy Company, 1916. pp. 108–109.
- Rev. Richard Stanton. A Menology of England and Wales, or, Brief Memorials of the Ancient British and English Saints Arranged According to the Calendar, Together with the Martyrs of the 16th and 17th Centuries. London: Burns & Oates, 1892. p. 164.

Greek Sources

- Great Synaxaristes: (in Greek) 18 ΑΠΡΙΛΙΟΥ. ΜΕΓΑΣ ΣΥΝΑΞΑΡΙΣΤΗΣ.
- (in Greek) Συναξαριστής. 18 Απριλίου. ECCLESIA.GR. (H ΕΚΚΛΗΣΙΑ ΤΗΣ ΕΛΛΑΔΟΣ).

Russian Sources

- (in Russian) 1 мая (18 апреля). Православная Энциклопедия под редакцией Патриарха Московского и всея Руси Кирилла (электронная версия). (Orthodox Encyclopedia - Pravenc.ru).
- (in Russian) Русская Православная Церковь Православный Церковный календарь на 2023 год.
