= Alexander Svirsky =

Russian saint (1448–1533)

Saint Alexander Svirsky
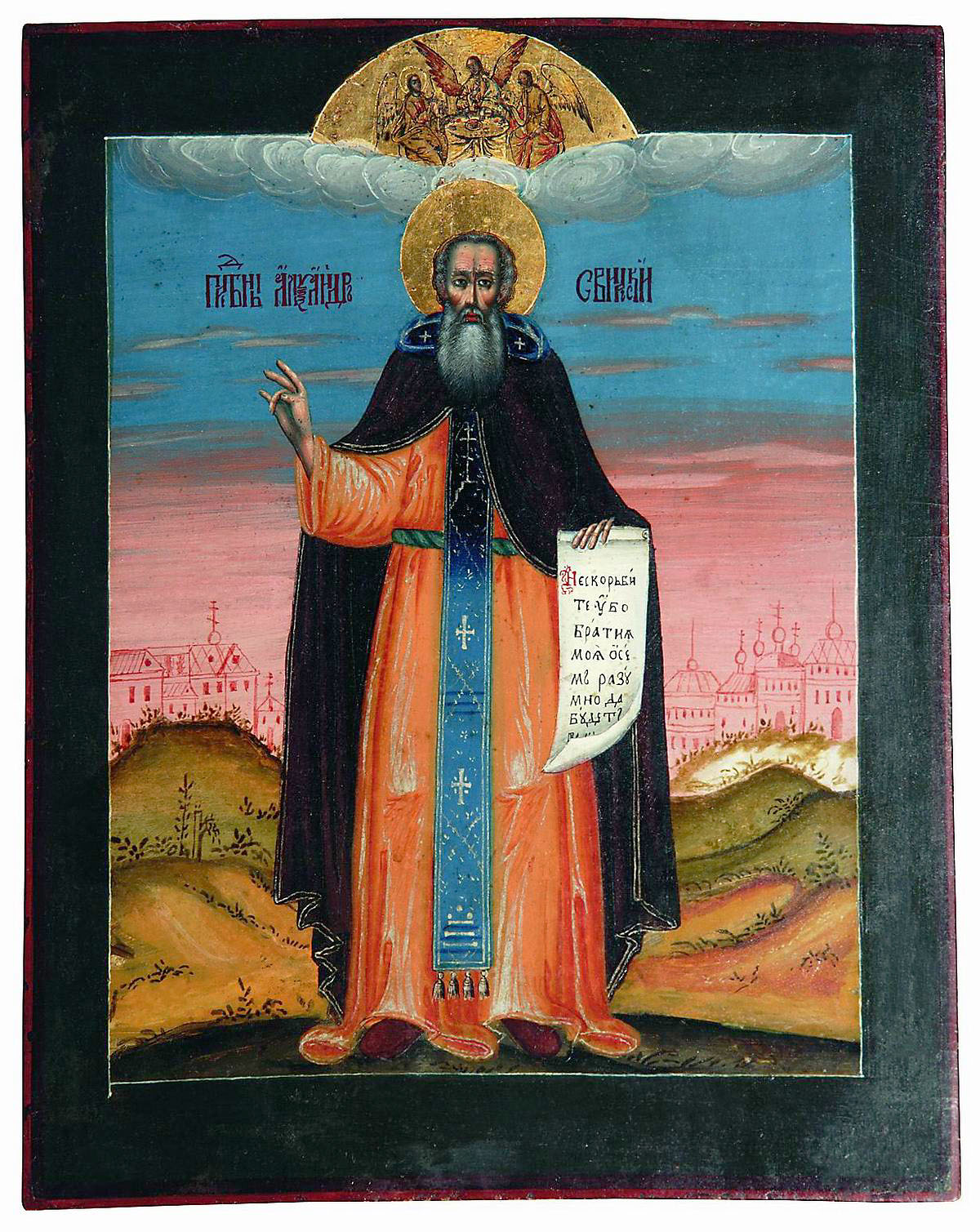
- Born: 15 Auly 1448; Obonezhskaya pyatina, Novgorod Republic
- Died: 30 August 1533; Novgorod Republic
- Resting place: Alexander-Svirsky Monastery
- Honored in: Eastern Orthodox Church
- Canonized: 1547
- Major shrine: Alexander-Svirsky Monastery
- Feast: 30 august (remembrance), 17 April (traslation of the relics)

Alexander Svirsky (Russian: Александр Свирский) or Alexander of Svir (Christian name: Amos; 1448 – 30 August 1533) was a Russian monk and hegumen of the Alexander-Svirsky Monastery. He was canonized as a saint by the Russian Orthodox Church in 1547.

== Life ==
Alexander Svirsky was born into a peasant family in Mandera, part of Obonezhskaya pyatina in the Novgorod Republic, east of Lake Ladoga. At his baptism, he was named after the prophet Amos. His parents were Stefan and Vassa; they took monastic vows near the end of their lives, receiving the names Sergiy and Varvara.

At the age of 26, he left home for the Valaam Monastery and became a monk. After the death of his parents, he returned to the Novgorod region and settled near Olonets.

In 1506, Serapion, the archbishop of Novgorod, appointed him as hegumen of the Trinity Monastery, which later became known as Alexander-Svirsky Monastery.

He died on 30 August 1533.

== Veneration ==
Alexander became known for his righteous life and contemplative miracles, including the appearances of the Trinity and the Virgin Mary with the Holy Child. The veneration of Alexander began immediately after his death. In 1545, his disciple Herodion (Kochnev) wrote his vita (life) with the blessing of Metropolitan Macarius of Moscow and Archbishop Feodosiy of Novgorod. The Russian Orthodox Church canonized Alexander Svirsky as a saint in 1547. His feast day is commemorated on 17 April and 30 August, according to the Eastern Orthodox liturgical calendar.

His relics were found on 27 April [O.S. 17 April] 1641. According to the vita of the saint, they were found incorruptible.

On 22 October 1918, the coffin with the relics of Alexander Svirsky was opened. According to Soviet reports, instead of relics, a wax doll was supposedly found. However, the testimony of the monks present, as well as a later Soviet commission under the direction of Grigory Zinoviev, demonstrated that a human body instead of a wax figure was present in the coffin.

== Sources ==
- "Александр Свирский" . Brockhaus and Efron Encyclopedic Dictionary (in Russian). 1906.
- Veretennikov, P. I.; Zhuravleva, I. A.; Polyakova, O. A. (2000). "Александр Свирский". Православная энциклопедия. Т. I: А — Алексий Студит (in Russian). Moscow: Православная энциклопедия. pp. 536–539. ISBN 5-89572-006-4.
