= Sava III =

Serbian archbishop and saint

Saint Sava III

Archbishop of All Serb and Littoral Lands
- Venerated in: Eastern Orthodox Church
- Church: Serbian Orthodox Church
- See: Archbishopric of Peć
- Installed: 1292
- Term ended: 1309
- Predecessor: Jevstatije II
- Successor: Nikodim I

Personal details
- Died: July 16, 1316
- Denomination: Eastern Orthodoxy

Sainthood
- Feast day: August 16
- Canonized: by Serbian Orthodox Church

Saint Sava III (Serbian: Свети Сава III / Sveti Sava III; died July 16, 1316) was the Serbian Archbishop from 1309 to 1316. Upon completing his studies, he began as a hegumen in Hilandar, then became the Bishop of Prizren. During his office as bishop, he worked on the Our Lady of Ljeviš church in Prizren. In 1309, he became the Serbian Archbishop. Sava III was an important figure of the development of architecture in Medieval Serbia. Prior to the founding of the Banjska Monastery, which Sava III did not survive, King Stefan Milutin consulted with him. In his charters confirming the endowments of King Milutin, he is styled "Archbishop of All Serbian and Maritime Lands". He rebuilt the Church of Saint George in Staro Nagoričane. According to the testimonies of his successor Archbishop Nikodim I, he regularly donated to Hilandar. The Serbian Orthodox Church venerate him as Saint Sava III on July 26 (August 8, Gregorian calendar).

== See also ==
- List of saints of the Serbian Orthodox Church
- List of heads of the Serbian Orthodox Church

Eastern Orthodox Church titles
Preceded by Jevstatije II	Serbian Archbishop; 1309–1316	Succeeded by Nikodim I
Preceded by Unknown	Bishop of Prizren; 1309	Succeeded by Unknown

== Sources ==
- Pakitibija.com, Житије срба светитеља: Сава Трећи, светитељ - архиепископ
