= Saint Estelle =

French Roman Catholic saint

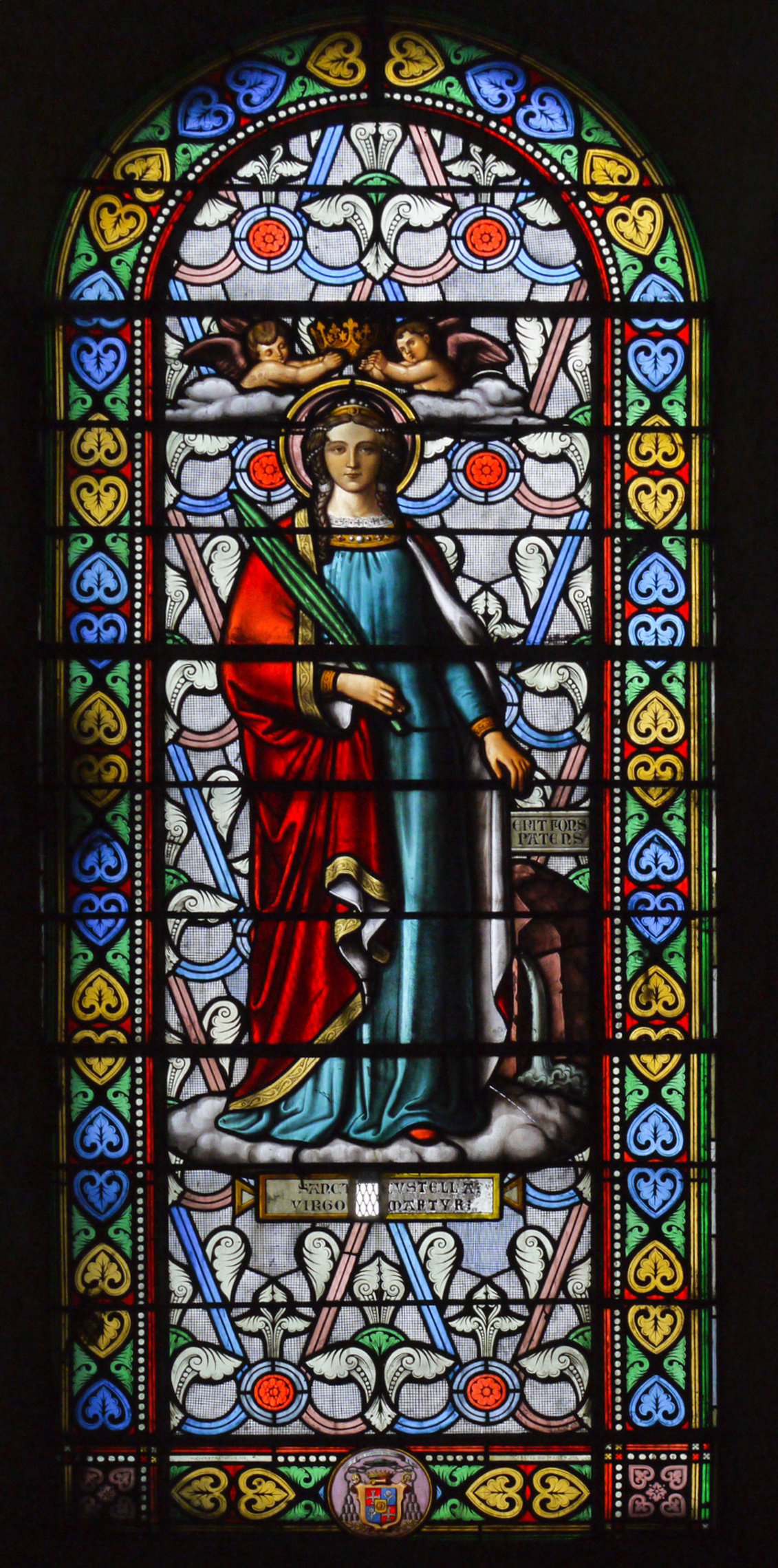
- Saint Estelle, in Basilique Saint-Eutrope, Saintes, France

Martyr
- Residence: Gaul
- Cause of death: Condemned to death by father in an arena
- Honored in: Roman Catholic Church
- Feast: 11 May
- Patronage: The Félibrige and young Christian girls

Saint Estelle was an alleged third-century martyr in Gaul, daughter of an illustrious Roman and descended from a powerful family of Druids. She was attracted to the group of Eutropius of Saintes, who was the first bishop of the area, and asked to be baptized. When she refused to abjure, her father condemned her to death in the arena. She has been popular in the Charente region and was considered a patron saint of young Christian girls. She is also the patron saint of the Félibrige, a literary and cultural association dedicated to the promotion of Occitan language and literature. Saint Estelle is celebrated on 11 May.

== Bibliography ==
- Sainte Estell
