= Jacob of Serbia =

Serbian archbishop and saint

Saint Jacob of Serbia

Metropolitan of Peć and Serbian Archbishop
- Venerated in: Eastern Orthodox Church
- Church: Serbian Orthodox Church
- See: Patriarchate of Peć
- Installed: 1286
- Term ended: 1292
- Predecessor: Jevstatije I
- Successor: Jevstatije II

Personal details
- Denomination: Eastern Orthodoxy

Sainthood
- Canonized: by Serbian Orthodox Church

Jakov (Serbian: Јаков) was the Serbian Archbishop from 1286 to 1292. Information on Jakov is scarce; it is known that he renovated and founded churches, and that he likely transferred the episcopal see from Žiča to the Peć metochion. He had special love for the Studenica monastery, to which he provided liturgical books and church accessories. He had special care for Serbian ascetics. He received his aureola with his saintly purity and Christian love, he was gentle, humble and charitable. The Serbian Orthodox Church venerates him as Saint Jakov on February 3, in the Church calendar, while February 16, on the Gregorian calendar.

== See also ==
- List of saints of the Serbian Orthodox Church
- List of heads of the Serbian Orthodox Church

Religious titles
| Preceded by Jevstatije I | Serbian Archbishop; 1286–1292 | Succeeded by Jevstatije II |

== Sources ==
- Pakitibija.com, Житије срба светитеља: Свети Јаков архиепископ
