= Nicodemus I of Peć =

Serbian archbishop and saint

Saint Nikodim I of Peć

Metropolitan of Peć and Serbian Archbishop
- Church: Serbian Orthodox Church
- See: Metropolitanate of Peć
- Installed: 1316
- Term ended: 1324
- Predecessor: Sava III
- Successor: Danilo II

Personal details
- Died: 1325
- Denomination: Eastern Orthodoxy

Sainthood
- Feast day: May 11/24
- Canonized: by Serbian Orthodox Church

Nikodim I of Peć or Nicodemus I of Peć (Serbian: Никодим I Пећки) was a monk-scribe at Hilandar before becoming the 10th Serbian Archbishop from 1316 to 1324, he died in the year 1325. He is a Serbian saint and the Eastern Orthodox Church celebrates his feast day on May 11/24. Nikodim is the author of Rodoslov: srpskih kraljeva i vladika (The Lives of Serbian Kings and Bishops).

== Life ==
In 1314, heir apparent Stefan Uroš III was exiled to Constantinople after quarrels with his father, king Stefan Milutin. In 1317, Uroš III asked Nikodim to intervene between him and his father. Nikodim's autobiographical note was inscribed in a manuscript entitled "A Visit to Constantinople" in the year 1318 and 1319. In 1320, Milutin allowed Uroš III to return upon the persuasion of Nikodim. Stefan Konstantin, Uroš's half-brother and heir to the throne, was crowned king upon the death of Milutin in 1321. Civil war erupted when Konstantin refused to submit to Uroš III, who then invaded Zeta, and in the ensuing battle, Konstantin was killed. After the victory, on January 6, 1322, Nikodim crowned Uroš King and Dušan Young King.

While he was the Abbot of his alma mater Hilandar, Nikodim requested that a certain protos (monk-priests) of Mt. Athos by the name of Theophanes issues an edict (gramma) wherein he grants to the monks of the Kelion of Saint Sava in Karyes, Mount Athos, a piece of land and an abandoned monastery. With the statement of the month, indiction, year, and the signatures of the Protos and the witnesses. Although the language is coarse and abounds in solecisms and "barbarisms", making it difficult to read, it was copied in skilled handwriting.

He co-founded 14th century Serbian Orthodox Vratna monastery alongside Serbian king Stefan Milutin (1282–1321) of the Nemanjić dynasty.

== See also ==
- List of saints of the Serbian Orthodox Church
- List of Eastern Orthodox saints
- List of heads of the Serbian Orthodox Church

Eastern Orthodox Church titles
Preceded by Sava III	Serbian Archbishop; 1316–1324	Succeeded by Danilo II

== Sources ==
- Fine, John Van Antwerp Jr. (1994). The Late Medieval Balkans: A Critical Survey from the Late Twelfth Century to the Ottoman Conquest. University of Michigan Press. ISBN 978-0-472-08260-5.
- G. Subotić (1982). "Pećki Parijarh i ohridski arhiepiskop Nikodim". ZRVI. 21: 213–236.
- Živković, Vojislav (2021). Serbian Kings Dragutin and Milutin. The Problem of the Succession of the Serbian Throne at the End of the 13th and Beginning of the 14th Century. Niš & Vranje: Centar za crkvene studije; Svepravoslavno društvo Prepodobni Justin Ćelijski i Vranjski. ISBN 978-86-84105-59-4.
