= Alexander-Svirsky Monastery =

Russian Orthodox monastery in Leningrad Oblast, Russia

Coordinates: 60°46′45″N 33°18′40″E

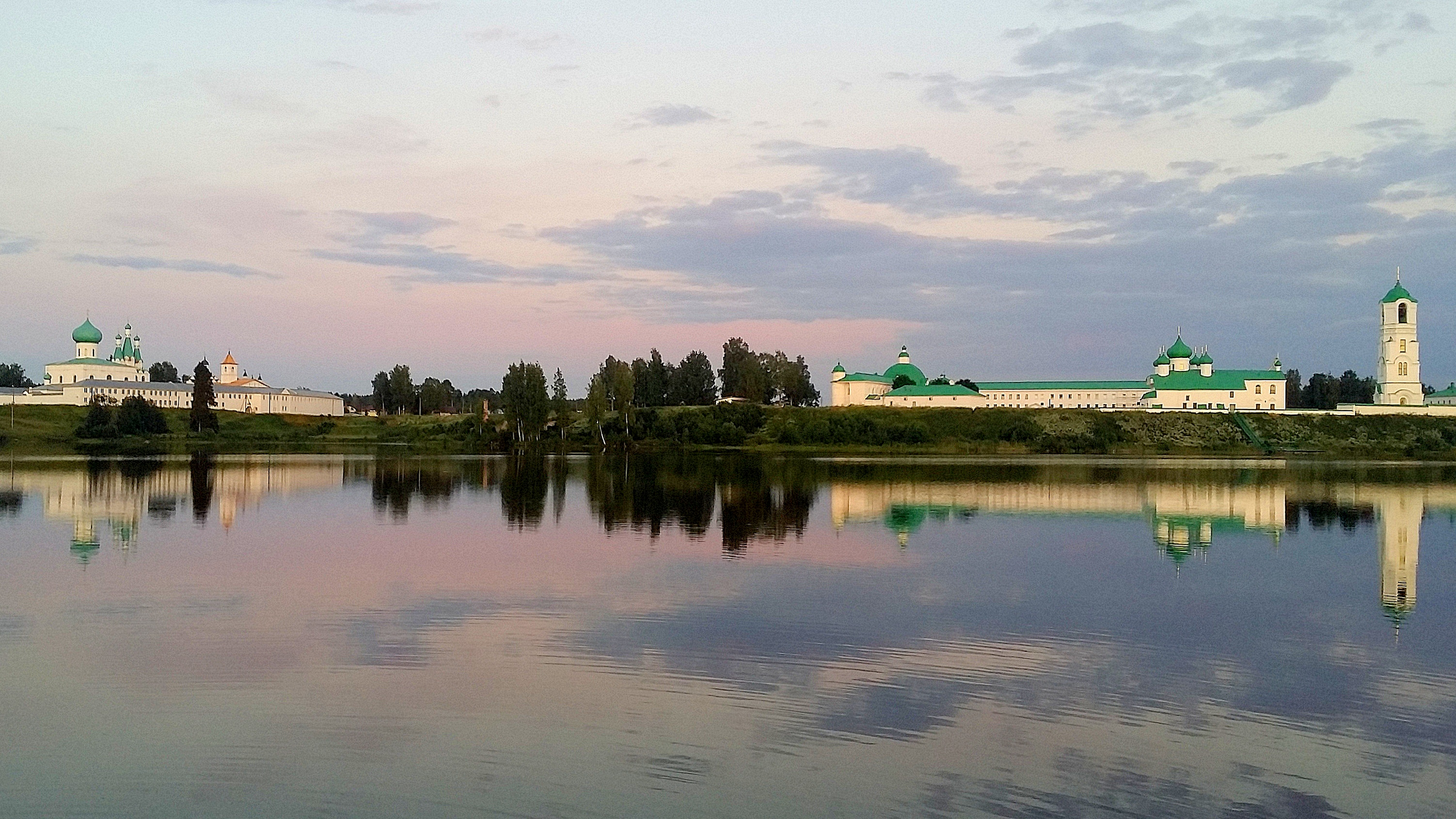
Both monastery compounds as seen from the Lake Roshchinskoye

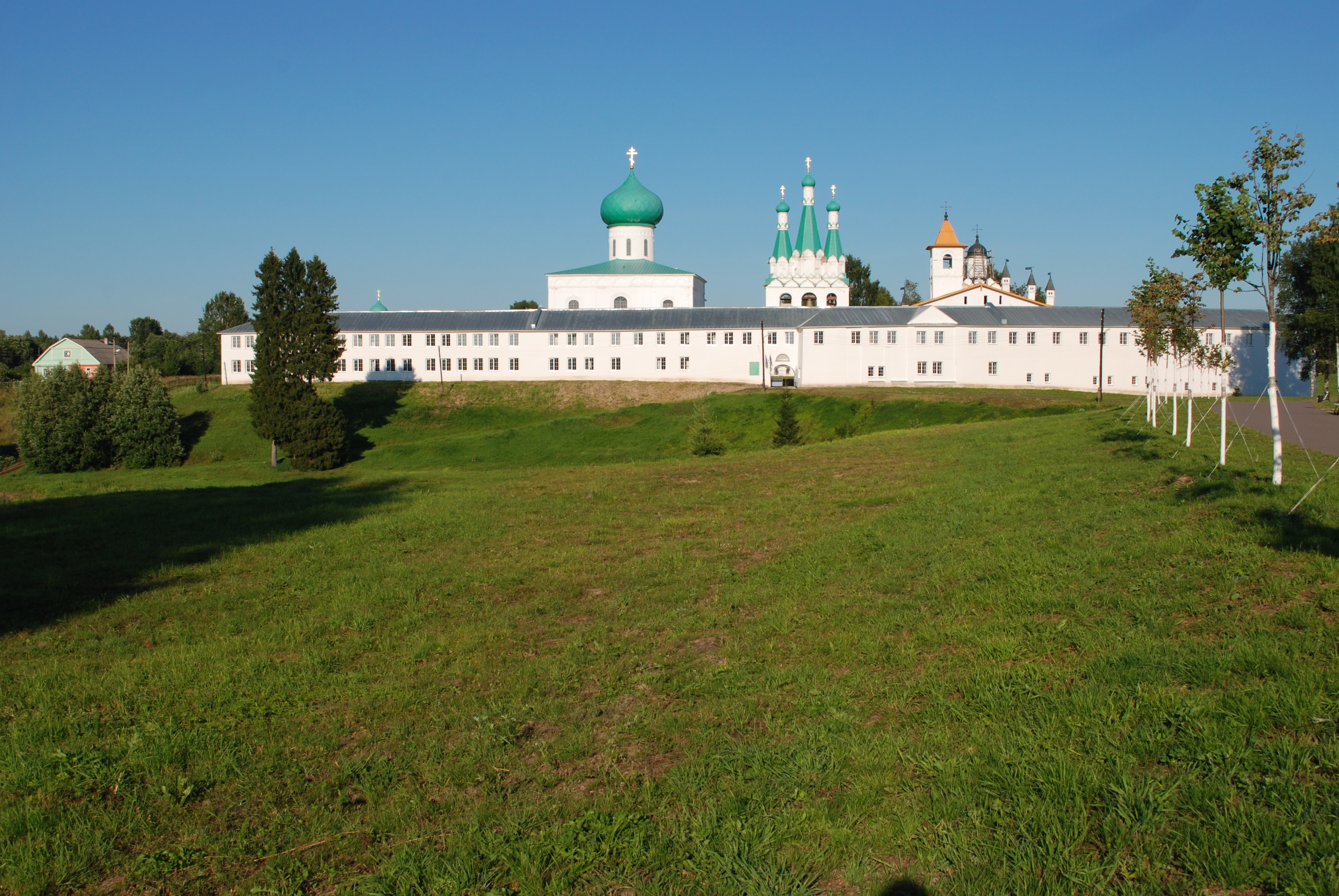
View towards the Trinity Monastery from the Transfiguration Monastery

Alexander-Svirsky Monastery (Russian: Александро-Свирский монастырь) is a Russian Orthodox monastery situated deep in the woods of the Leningrad Oblast, just south from its border with the Republic of Karelia. The golden age of this cloister was in the 17th century. It boasts one of the few preserved three-tented belfries and medieval clock towers in Russia.

The abbey was founded in 1487, when a monk of the Valaam Monastery, named Alexander, settled between Roshchinsky and Holy lakes, 20 km to the east from Lake Ladoga and 6 km from the Svir River. During his life in the woods, he had a vision of the Holy Trinity who ordered him to build two oaken chapels dedicated to the Trinity and the Saviour's Transfiguration. These churches gave birth to the twin Trinity and the Transfiguration cloisters, collectively known as the Alexander Svirsky Monastery.

The monastery's founder died on August 30, 1533, and was buried at the Transfiguration cloister, which still serves as a burial place for the local monks. 12 years later, his disciples recounted his life in a biography. The church synod of 1547 canonized Alexander of the Svir, and the new saint became venerated throughout Russian lands. One of the chapels of the famous Saint Basil's Cathedral on Red Square, for instance, was consecrated to him.

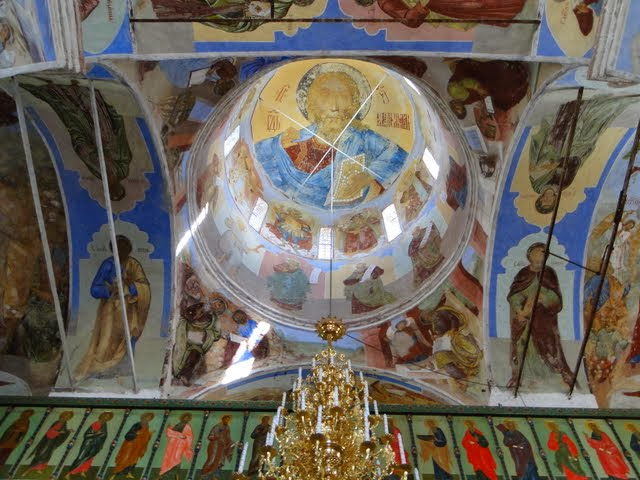
The frescoed cupola of one of the two katholikons.

The Russian tsars bestowed many important privileges on Alexander's cloister, including the right to appropriate taxes from the Svir Fair, which was held annually under the cloister walls. During the Time of Troubles, the Swedes sacked and burnt both hermitages on three occasions, and yet the monastery continued to prosper. After the Russian-Swedish border was delineated west of the Svir River, much of the trade between two nations had to pass through the Svir Fair, further augmenting the monastery's importance.

This renewed prosperity was reflected in the monastic structures erected in the 1640s. In 1644, when the five-domed Transfiguration Cathedral was finished, Tsar Mikhail Feodorovich presented to the monks a golden ark for keeping St Alexander's relics there. A belfry of the Trinity cloister was built in three tiers and crowned with three tents in 1649. Most of the monastic cells date back to the 1670s. The roomy Trinity Cathedral was completed by 1695. The last structure to be erected within monastery walls was the hospital chapel of St John of Damascus (1718).

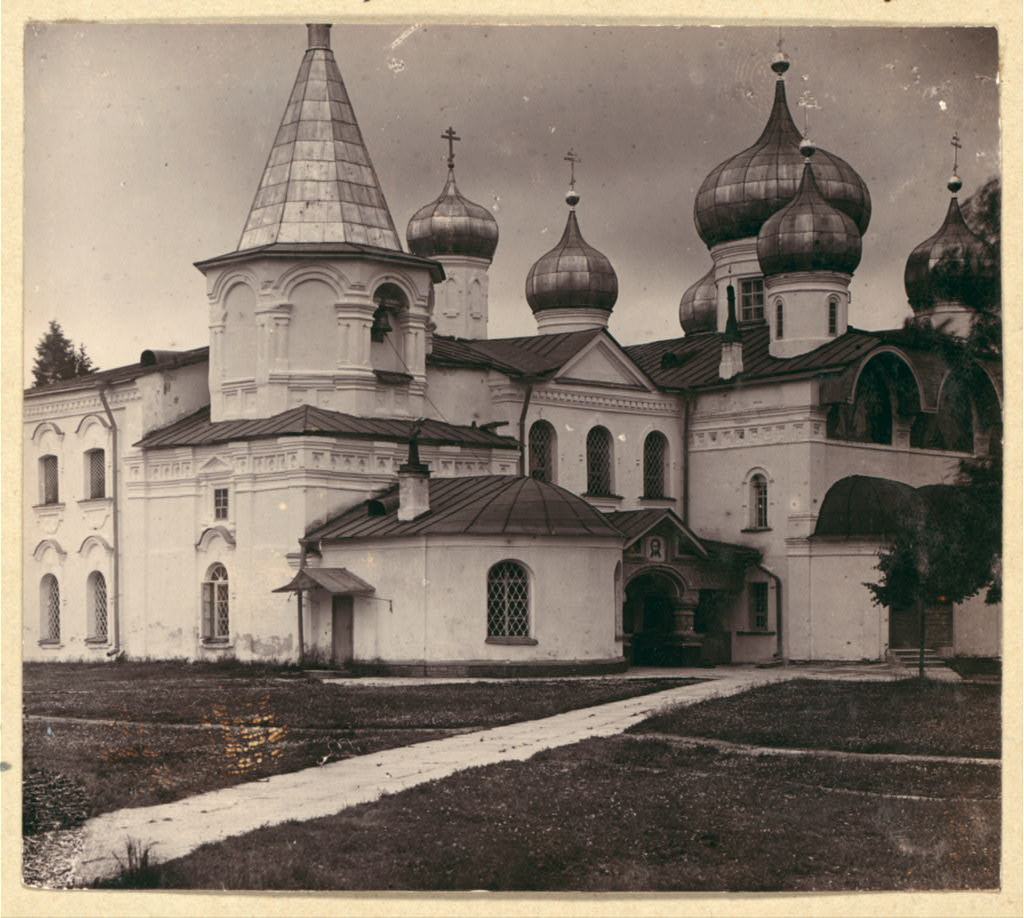
The Transfiguration Cathedral, as photographed by Prokudin-Gorski in 1909

The vast lands of the Alexander Svirsky Monastery were secularized during Catherine the Great's ecclesiastical reform in 1764. The Transfiguration cloister continued as a seat of the local seminary and a residence of the Olonets archbishops, who rebuilt much of the monastery structures for their own needs.

Following the Russian Revolution of 1917, the monks were imprisoned and then executed by the Cheka after trying to resist Bolshevik forces. The relics of St Alexander were desecrated and put on a public display in Leningrad. The medieval monastery buildings housed a gulag labor camp known as Svirlag. They were further damaged during World War II. Restoration did not commence until the 1970s.

As of 2005, the Transfiguration Cloister is the home to the local monastic community, while the Trinity Cloister still houses a mental asylum instituted in 1953. The monastery has a subsidiary chapel in St Petersburg, situated some 260 km to the west.

== Sources ==
- "Свирский монастырь" . Brockhaus and Efron Encyclopedic Dictionary (in Russian). 1906.
