= Suitbert the Younger =

7th century Anglo-Saxon Christian saint

Saint Suitbert, Suidbert, Suitbertus, or Swithbert, an abbot venerated in the Roman Catholic Church and Eastern Orthodox Church, who lived in a monastery near the River Dacre, Cumberland, England, and is mentioned by the Venerable Bede. His liturgical feast is on April 30.

He is not to be confused with Suitbert of Kaiserswerth, another 7th-century Anglo-Saxon Christian saint of the same name.
