= Jevstatije II =

Serbian archbishop and saint

Saint Jevstatije II
- Venerated in: Eastern Orthodox Church
- Metropolitan of Peć and Serbian Archbishop
- Church: Serbian Orthodox Church
- See: Metropolitanate of Peć
- Installed: 1292
- Term ended: 1309
- Predecessor: Jakov I
- Successor: Sava III

Personal details
- Denomination: Eastern Orthodoxy

Sainthood
- Feast day: August 16
- Canonized: by Serbian Orthodox Church

Jevstatije II (Serbian Cyrillic: Јевстатије II; fl. 1292–d. 1309) was the Serbian Archbishop from 1292 to 1309. In the times of his two predecessors, Serbia expanded significantly in territory. In 1282, Skopje (future capital), Polog, Ovče Polje, Zletovo, Pijenac, Kičevo and Debar were conquered. In the north Braničevo and Vidin were taken by 1290. New eparchies were established: Gračanička, Končanska, Limska, Mačvanska, Braničevska, Beogradska and Skopska. The Serbian Orthodox Church venerates him as Saint Jevstatije II on August 16 (August 29, Gregorian calendar).

== See also ==
- List of saints of the Serbian Orthodox Church
- List of heads of the Serbian Orthodox Church

Religious titles
Preceded by Jakov I	Serbian Archbishop; 1292–1309	Succeeded by Sava III

== Sources ==
- Pakitibija.com, Житије срба светитеља (Lives of the Serbian saints): Свети Јевстатије Други, светитељ - архиепископ (Saint Eustathius Second, saint - archbishop)]
