= Quintian of Rome =

Quintian (Latin: Quintianus or Quinctianus; fl. c. June–later July AD 250) was a Christian confessor associated with Rome during the Decian persecution.

Quintian is known from a letter written by the confessor Lucianus to Celerinus, preserved among the letters of Cyprian of Carthage, in which he is named among the confessors who were with Celerinus at Rome. Lucianus asks Celerinus to greet these confessors, naming Uranius, Alexius, Quintianus and Colonica among them. Cyprian subsequently sent copies of Lucian's letter and Celerinus's reply to the Roman clergy.

Quintian has been identified as probably a refugee from Carthage. He was among the Roman confessors who languished in prison during the Decian persecution.

Nothing further is securely known about Quintian. His later life and fate are unknown.
