= Pomorje =

Style in Byzantine intitulation

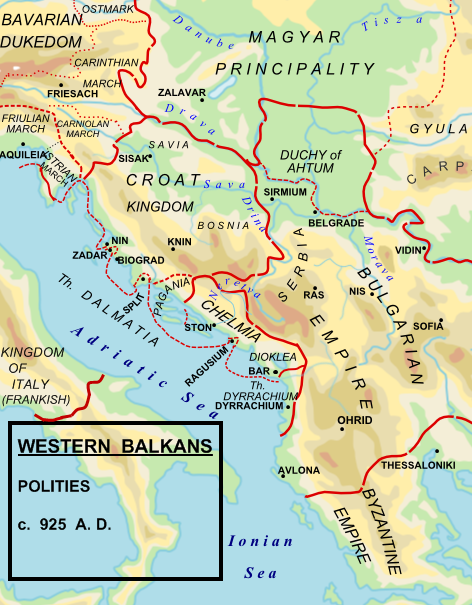
Political map of the western Balkan in 925 AD

Pomorje (Serbian Cyrillic: Поморје), also known (in plural) as the Lands of Pomorje (Serbian: Поморске земље / Pomorske zemlje), is a medieval term, used in Byzantine title, and at the end of the 12th century, during the reign of Stefan Nemanja (1166–1196), inherited by Serbian monarchs, thus becoming part of the Serbian title, whose rulers were styled with the title: "crowned king and autocrat of all Serbian and coastal lands".

== Use in royal titles ==
The term was used in royal and religious titles both by Bosnian and Serbian monarchs and their heirs (Uroš I, styled himself "King in Christ, God faithful, King of Serbia and Maritime Lands", and Patriarchs (Saint Sava III, "Archbishop of All Serbian and Maritime Lands").

- Desa, styled himself "Prince of Pomorje (Maritime Lands)"
- Vladislav, styled himself "King of all the Serbian and Maritime Lands"
- Uroš I, styled himself "King in Christ, God faithful, King of Serbia and Maritime Lands"
- Uroš IV Dušan, "King of all the Serbian and Maritime Lands"
- 1329 Stephen II, Ban of Bosnia, styled "high and mighty lord, free ruler and master of Bosnia, Usora and Soli, Donji Kraji and many other places, and Prince of the Hum and the Seaside"
- 1377 Tvrtko I crowned himself "King of Serbia, Bosnia, Maritime, and Western Sides".

== Sources ==
Primary sources

- Ферјанчић, Божидар (1959). "Константин VII Порфирогенит". Византиски извори за историју народа Југославије. Vol. 2. Београд: Византолошки институт. pp. 1–98.
- Кунчер, Драгана (2009). Gesta Regum Sclavorum. Vol. 1. Београд-Никшић: Историјски институт, Манастир Острог.
- Moravcsik, Gyula, ed. (1967) [1949]. Constantine Porphyrogenitus: De Administrando Imperio (2nd revised ed.). Washington D.C.: Dumbarton Oaks Center for Byzantine Studies. ISBN 9780884020219.
- Pertz, Georg Heinrich, ed. (1845). Einhardi Annales. Hanover.
- Scholz, Bernhard Walter, ed. (1970). Carolingian Chronicles: Royal Frankish Annals and Nithard's Histories. University of Michigan Press. ISBN 0472061860.
- Шишић, Фердо, ed. (1928). Летопис Попа Дукљанина (Chronicle of the Priest of Duklja). Београд-Загреб: Српска краљевска академија.
- Живковић, Тибор (2009). Gesta Regum Sclavorum. Vol. 2. Београд-Никшић: Историјски институт, Манастир Острог.

Secondary sources

- Ćirković, Sima (2004). The Serbs. Malden: Blackwell Publishing. ISBN 9781405142915.
- Ćorović, Vladimir (2001). "Istorija srpskog naroda".
- Curta, Florin (2006). Southeastern Europe in the Middle Ages, 500–1250. Cambridge: Cambridge University Press.
- Fine, John Van Antwerp Jr. (1991) [1983]. The Early Medieval Balkans: A Critical Survey from the Sixth to the Late Twelfth Century. Ann Arbor, Michigan: University of Michigan Press. ISBN 0472081497.
- Fine, John Van Antwerp Jr. (1994) [1987]. The Late Medieval Balkans: A Critical Survey from the Late Twelfth Century to the Ottoman Conquest. Ann Arbor, Michigan: University of Michigan Press. ISBN 0472082604.
- Fine, John Van Antwerp Jr. (2005). When Ethnicity Did Not Matter in the Balkans: A Study of Identity in Pre-Nationalist Croatia, Dalmatia, and Slavonia in the Medieval and Early-Modern Periods. Ann Arbor, Michigan: University of Michigan Press. ISBN 0472025600.
- Hupchick, Dennis P. (2002). The Balkans: From Constantinople to Communism. New York: Palgrave. ISBN 9780312217365.
- Hupchick, Dennis P. (2017). The Bulgarian-Byzantine Wars for Early Medieval Balkan Hegemony: Silver-Lined Skulls and Blinded Armies. New York: Springer. ISBN 9783319562063.
- Luttwak, Edward N. (2009). The Grand Strategy of the Byzantine Empire. Harvard University Press. ISBN 9780674035195.
- Orbini, Mauro (1601). Il Regno de gli Slavi hoggi corrottamente detti Schiavoni. Pesaro: Apresso Girolamo Concordia.
- Орбин, Мавро (1968). Краљевство Словена. Београд: Српска књижевна задруга.
- Ostrogorsky, George (1956). History of the Byzantine State. Oxford: Basil Blackwell.
- Runciman, Steven (1988). The Emperor Romanus Lecapenus and His Reign: A Study of Tenth-Century Byzantium. Cambridge University Press. ISBN 9780521357227.
- Sedlar, Jean W. (1994). East Central Europe in the Middle Ages, 1000-1500. Seattle: University of Washington Press. ISBN 9780295800646.
- Stephenson, Paul (2003). The Legend of Basil the Bulgar-Slayer. Cambridge: Cambridge University Press. ISBN 9780521815307.
- Vlasto, Alexis P. (1970). The Entry of the Slavs into Christendom: An Introduction to the Medieval History of the Slavs. Cambridge: Cambridge University Press. ISBN 9780521074599.
- Whittow, Mark (1996), The Making of Byzantium, 600–1025, MacMillan Press, ISBN 0-520-20496-4
- Живковић, Тибор (2002). Јужни Словени под византијском влашћу 600-1025 (South Slavs under the Byzantine Rule 600-1025). Београд: Историјски институт САНУ, Службени гласник. ISBN 9788677430276.
- Živković, Tibor (2008). Forging unity: The South Slavs between East and West 550-1150. Belgrade: The Institute of History, Čigoja štampa. ISBN 9788675585732.
