= Athanasia of Aegina =

9th-century Christian saint

Saint Athanasia of Aegina
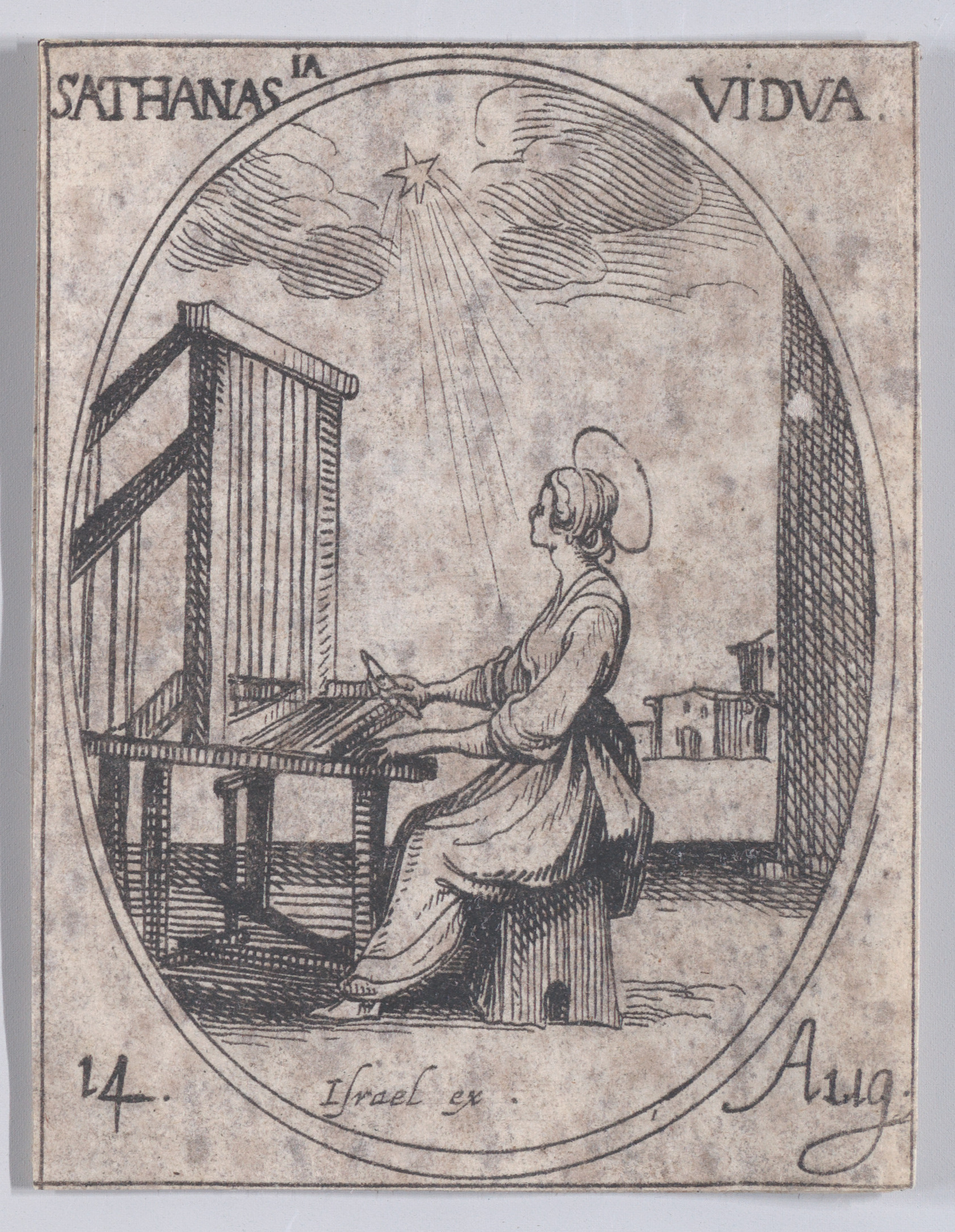
- Athanasia of Aegina (print by Jacques Callot, early 17th century)
- Born: circa 790; Aegina, Greece
- Died: 15 August 860; Timia, Greece

Athanasia of Aegina (c.790 in Aegina – 15 August 860 in Timia, Greece) was a Byzantine saint and abbess. Athanasia's hagiographer called her "this praiseworthy woman, who bears the name of immortality, who lived her life admirably". She is known by one hagiography, written by an anonymous writer shortly after her death and published in 916. She was born of noble parents and received a standard education for girls at the time. When she was seven years old, she experienced a vision that inspired her to enter a convent. Her parents forced her to marry not once but twice, the first time at the age of 16, to a soldier who was killed in battle a little over two weeks after they were married, and the second time to a man who also chose to enter the religious life.

Athanasia became an ascetic, gave away all her possessions, built churches, and started a convent with other women in Aegina. She became abbess of the convent and moved it to Timia, Greece. She left Aegina to live sequestered in Constantinople for seven years and returned to Aegina shortly before she died on 15 April 860. Most of the miracles attributed to her occurred after her death.

== Life ==
Athanasia of Aegina was born on the Greek island of Aegina in 790, the daughter of Niketas and Irene, who were Christian nobles. She resided in the Byzantine Empire and was an advisor to Theodora II. She is known from one hagiography, which is preserved in one manuscript, written shortly after her death and published in 916, but the anonymous male author is unknown. According to the Bibliotheca Sanctorum, Athanasia's hagiography, entitled "The Life and Conduct of our Blessed Mother, Athanasia, and a Partial Narration of Her Miracles," is told in two identical vitae, one in Greek and the other in Latin. The exact dates of her life are uncertain, but based on internal evidence of her hagiography, she probably lived during the first half of the ninth century, at the time of the early Arab raids on the Aegean islands. According to Lee Francis Sherry, the translator of Athanasia's vitae, the author, who was an eyewitness to Athanasia's posthumous miracles and verified them with the nuns who had lived with her, apologizes for his "mundane style, calling himself 'entirely devoid of lofty expression". He stated that he wrote about Athanasia so that her history would not be lost, "and thereby harm many people". Sherry states that he limits his citations to Biblical references and that his writing is "quite conventional". Sherry adds that the hagiographer does not mention iconoclasm, even though "one would expect some reference to it in the vitae of a saint who supposedly lived in the first half of the ninth century" and speculates that this may be due to the fact that image veneration might not have been as big a controversy on the Aegean islands, where she was venerated, as it was in Constantinople and Bithynia. Sherry also states that the title of Athanasia's vitae demonstrates that its author consciously added Athanasia's posthumous miracles to the end of her hagiography.

Athanasia received a standard education that consisted of readings in the Psalter and the Bible. Scholar Oana-Maria Cojocaru, when discussing the education of young noble girls during the late 8th century, stated that Athanasia received an elementary education, which began when she was seven years old. It is unclear if she had a tutor or if she was educated at home by her parents. According to scholar Eve Davies, during her discussion of the education of Byzantine youths during the late 8th century, by the time Athanasia was seven years old, like many children her age, she had learned the Psalter in a short time and "eagerly studied all the Holy Scriptures". Cojocaru, in her discussion of the skills Byzantine girls learned in preparation for marriage, states that Athanasia's vitae records a vision she experienced while she was learning to weave on the loom at her home, in which she saw a shining star that came from heaven and shone on her chest before disappearing from her sight. Her experience inspired her to pursue monasticism, although her parents opposed her wishes and forced her to marry. Cojocaru stated that although Athanasia was able to enter a monastery as an adult, it proved that "the agency of children, more specifically making a life-changing decision, was more available to boys than girls". Athanasia's hagiographer states, about this experience, "By this light, therefore, she was abundantly enlightened in her soul and came into an absolute hatred for the vanity of life".

Like many Byzantine female saints of the 9th through the 13th centuries, Athanasia entered a convent after marriage, which demonstrates that in Byzantium, marriage was not viewed as a barrier to religious life, whereas relatively few male saints of the same period were married. She was married twice, "although involuntarily in both instances according to her hagiographer". Her parents forced her into her first marriage when she was 16 years old, but her husband was killed during an Arab raid on Aegina a little over two weeks after they were married. Her parents forced her into a second marriage because an imperial edict was issued that required unmarried women and widows to marry foreigners. After a few years of marriage, she and her second husband "reached a mutual agreement of separation" so that they could both live monastic lifestyles, which he did until his death. She joined a group of other pious women and, after giving away all her possessions to the poor, began a convent with them. After three or four years, she unwillingly accepted the position of abbess, although "continued to maintain an ascetic way of life with regard to food, sleep, and dress". According to Sherry, Athanasia's "saintly qualities were manifested in her leadership of her convent; in her teaching, asceticism, and visions; and by miraculous cures effected by her relics". Four years later, the convent was moved to Timia, near the ancient church of Stephen the Protomartyr. Athanasia built three churches on Aegina, dedicated to the Theotokos, to John the Baptist, and to Saint Nicholas.

The only time she performed a miracle during her life was the cure of a man with the same eye disease she also suffered from and was healed from as well. According to her hagiographer, while describing her vision that inspired her to enter a monastery when she was a child, Athanasia experienced "the divine through visions of holy figures". She also "distinguished herself in almsgiving" and welcomed visiting monks and "plentifully provided widows and orphans and all the needy with the necessities of life". She provided food during a famine, not only to believers but to heretics from Asia Minor. She met with the women in town every Sunday and feast day to read and teach the Scriptures to them. According to her hagiographer, "No abuse emerged from her venerable mouth, neither against the small, nor the great, neither against a slave, nor a free person...she was tolerant of everyone in meekness of opinion and in rectitude of heart".

Athanasia continued, even after her second marriage, "her habitual concern for her own salvation", which included "applying herself tirelessly to the chanting of the psalms and devoting herself with assiduity to reading Scripture". Her hagiographer stated that Athanasia, after her second husband died, took advantage of her freedom, and "totally dedicated her entire self to God". He described her ascetic practices: she would "partake of a little bread and a modest amount of water after the ninth hour"; fasted entirely from cheese and fish except on Easter and with her fellow nuns; ate only raw greens every other day and had nothing to drink during Lent; and slept on large stones on the ground, with a small goatshair cloth for a blanket. She would weep while praying and chanting the psalms. She ate no fruit from the time she became a nun until her death. She wore a goat's hair shirt as her inner garment, "which irritated her flesh with its roughness, and her outer clothing was a ragged garment of sheep wool". As a young girl, she experienced visions "of a man gleaming in a cloud and a voice which told her to pursue humility and meekness" and had visions of Christ and of ecstatic experiences while in prayer.

Some time after becoming the abbess of the convent in Timia, according to Sherry, Athanasia went to Constantinople "at an unspecified date" where she lived sequestered in a monastery for almost seven years. A dream sent her back to Aegina, and she became ill shortly after returning. She died twelve days later, on 15 August 860, on the Feast of the Dormition of the Virgin Mary, which became one of her feast days. Her tomb became the source of many healing miracles. Her relics were exhumed and transferred to an open-view coffin a year later. According to Sherry, there may have been another transfer of her relics, which was originally commemorated on 13 April.

== Legacy ==
Anathansia's hagiographer called her "this praiseworthy woman, who bears the name of immortality, who lived her life admirably". Almost nothing is known of Athanasia's cult. Like most women who attained sainthood during the Middle Byzantine period, her cult was restricted locally, to Aegina.

Her hagiographer described miracles that occurred after Athanasia's death, including healings of possession and other physical injuries, diseases, and paralysis. He stated that after she died, the abbess who succeeded her had visions of her in dreams. She and other leaders of the convent had visions of her during her commemoration held 40 days after Anathansia's death. Two men and one woman were healed from possession of evil spirits during the Mass of her commemoration. Fragrant oil dripped from all sides of her coffin; it was opened, and her body was uncorrupted. Oana-Maria Cojocaru reports that a goat-hair sticharion that belonged to Athanasia healed a girl who suffered from an affliction in her neck, although it is unclear if the healing occurred before or after Athanasia's death.

== Works cited ==
- Cojocaru, Oana-Maria (2022). Byzantine Childhood: Representations and Experiences of Children in Middle Byzantine Society. New York: Routledge. ISBN 978-0-429-31849-8.
- Sherry, Lee Francis (1996). "Life of St. Athanasia of Aegina". In Talbot, Alice-Mary (ed.). Holy Women of Byzantium: Ten Saints' Lives in English Translation. Washington, D.C.: Dumbarton Oaks. pp. 137–158. ISBN 0-88402-248-X.
