= March 4 (Eastern Orthodox liturgics) =

Day in the Eastern Orthodox liturgical calendar

Eastern Orthodox liturgical calendar
| March 3 | March 4 | March 5 |
March 4 O.S. ≍ March 17 N.S. March 4 N.S ≍ February 19 (or February 20 (Note: in a leap year)) O.S.

An Eastern Orthodox cross

March 4 in Eastern Orthodox liturgical calendars is a feast day and a day of commemoration of saints and martyrs. Although some Orthodox churches use the Revised Julian Calendar and others use the traditional Julian calendar, the fixed commemorations for their respective March 4 are broadly the same, no matter which calendar is used. (Note: Despite the dates being the same, the days to which they refer typically differ by 13 days. The notation Old Style or O.S. is sometimes used to indicate a date in the traditional Julian Calendar (the "Old Calendar"). The notation New Style or N.S. indicates a date in the Revised Julian calendar (the "New Calendar").)

== Saints ==
- Saint Julian of Alexandria, Bishop of Alexandria (189)
- Martyrs Paul and his sister Juliana, and Quadratus, Acacius, and Stratonicus, at Ptolemais in Egypt (273) (see also: August 17)
- Venerable Gerasimus of Jordan (475)
- Saint Gregory of Constantius in Cyprus, Bishop. (Note: His memory is preserved in the Patmos Codex (Patmiako Codex).)
- Saint Jacob the Faster, of Phoenicia, Syria (6th century)

== Pre-Schism Western saints ==
- Saint Lucius I, succeeded St Cornelius as Pope of Rome in 253, and was at once sent into exile. (Note: "At Rome, on the Appian way, during the persecution of Valerian, the birthday of St. Lucius, pope and martyr, who was first exiled for the faith of Christ; but being permitted by divine Providence to return to his church, he suffered martyrdom by decapitation, after having combated the Novatians. His praises have been published by St. Cyprian.")
- Martyrs of Rome, a group of nine hundred martyrs buried in the Catacombs of Callistus on the Appian Way in Rome (260) (Note: "Also, at Rome, on the Appian road, nine hundred holy martyrs, who were buried in the same cemetery as St. Cecilia.")
- Saint Leonard of Avranches, Bishop of Avranches (ca. 614)
- Saint Owen (Owin), a monk at Lastingham in England with St Chad, then settled at a monastery near Lichfield (ca. 680)
- Saint Basinus, monk and Abbot of St Maximin in Trier in Germany, succeeded St Numerian as bishop of the city (ca. 705)
- Saint Appian, a monk at the monastery of St Peter of Ciel d'Oro in Pavia, became a hermit in Comacchio and brought Christ to that region (ca. 800)
- Saint Adrian of May and Companions, a bishop on the Isle of May in the Firth of Forth in Scotland, martyred by the Danes together with other monks (ca. 875) (Note: "S. Adrian, bishop of S. Andrews, in Scotland, was a native of Pannonia. He laboured to spread the faith among the Picts, together with his companions, Clodian, Caius, Monan, and Stobrand. As they were in the island of May, the Danish pirates landed in it, and put Adrian and Clodian to death.")
- Saint Felix of Rhuys, a monk at Fleury Abbey (Saint-Benoit-sur-Loire) in France (1038) (Note: Born near Quimper in Brittany, he became a hermit on Ouessant and afterwards a monk at Fleury (Saint-Benoit-sur-Loire) in France. He restored the monastery of Rhuys, founded by St Gildas, which had been destroyed by the Vikings.)

== Post-Schism Orthodox saints ==
- Saint Gregory, Bishop of Assos near Ephesus (1150) (Note: The Translation of his Relics to Lesvos took place on November 16, 1935.)
- Venerable Gerasimus, monk of Vologda, founder of the Holy Trinity Monastery (1178)
- Blessed Basil (Basilko), Prince of Rostov (1238)
- Saints of Pskov martyred by the Latins:

- Saint Ioasaph of Snetogorsk Monastery, and St. Basil of Mirozh Monastery (1299)

- Saint Daniel of Moscow, Great Prince (1303)
- Saint Peter (Michurin), youth of Tobolsk (Peter of Tomsk) (1820) (Note: (in Russian) Пётр Томский. Википедии. (Russian Wikipedia).)

=== New martyrs and confessors ===
- New Hieromartyr Michael Kargopolov, Priest of Krasnoyarsk (1919)
- New Hieromartyr Dimitry Ivanov of Kiev, Archpriest (1933)
- New Hieromartyr Vyacheslav Leontiev of Nizhegorod, Priest (1937)
- New Martyr John of Al-Sindiyana, Palestine (1937)
- New Hieromartyr Alexander, Priest (1938) (Note: (in Russian) Лихарев Александр Петрович, +17.03.1938.)

== Other commemorations ==
- Translation of the relics (938) of Martyr Wenceslaus (Vaclav), Prince of the Czechs (935)
- Repose of Schemamonk Mark of Glinsk Hermitage (1893)
- Repose of Schema-Nun Agnia, Eldress of Karaganda (1976)

== Icon gallery ==
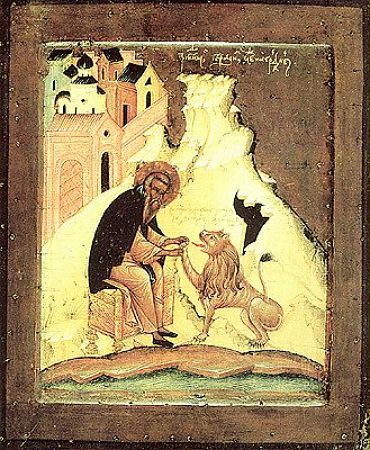
Venerable Gerasimus of Jordan.

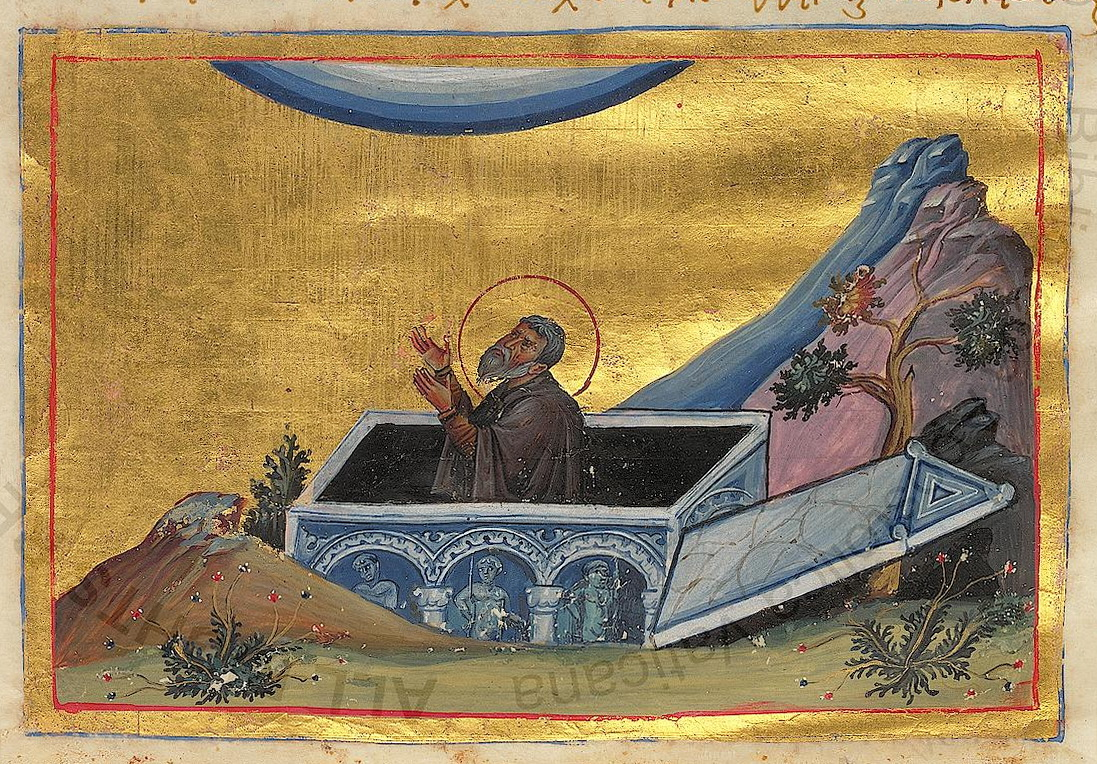
St. Jacob the Faster, of Phoenicia, Syria.
(Menologion of Basil II, 10th century).

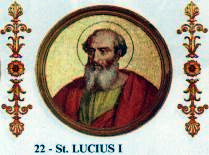
Saint Lucius I, Pope of Rome.

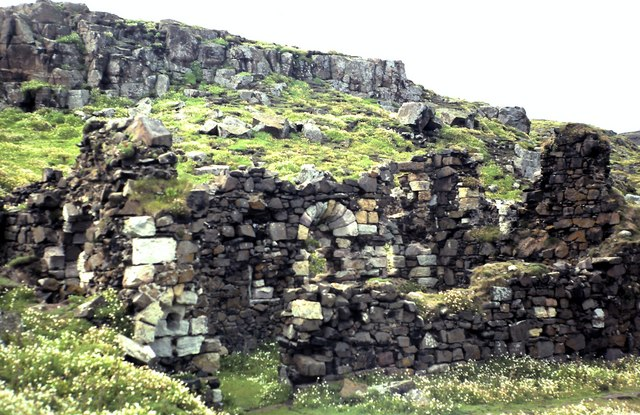
Saint Adrian's Priory, Isle of May.

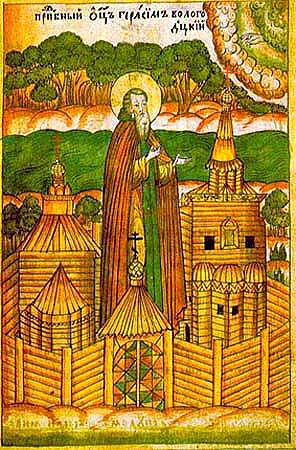
Venerable Gerasimus of Vologda.

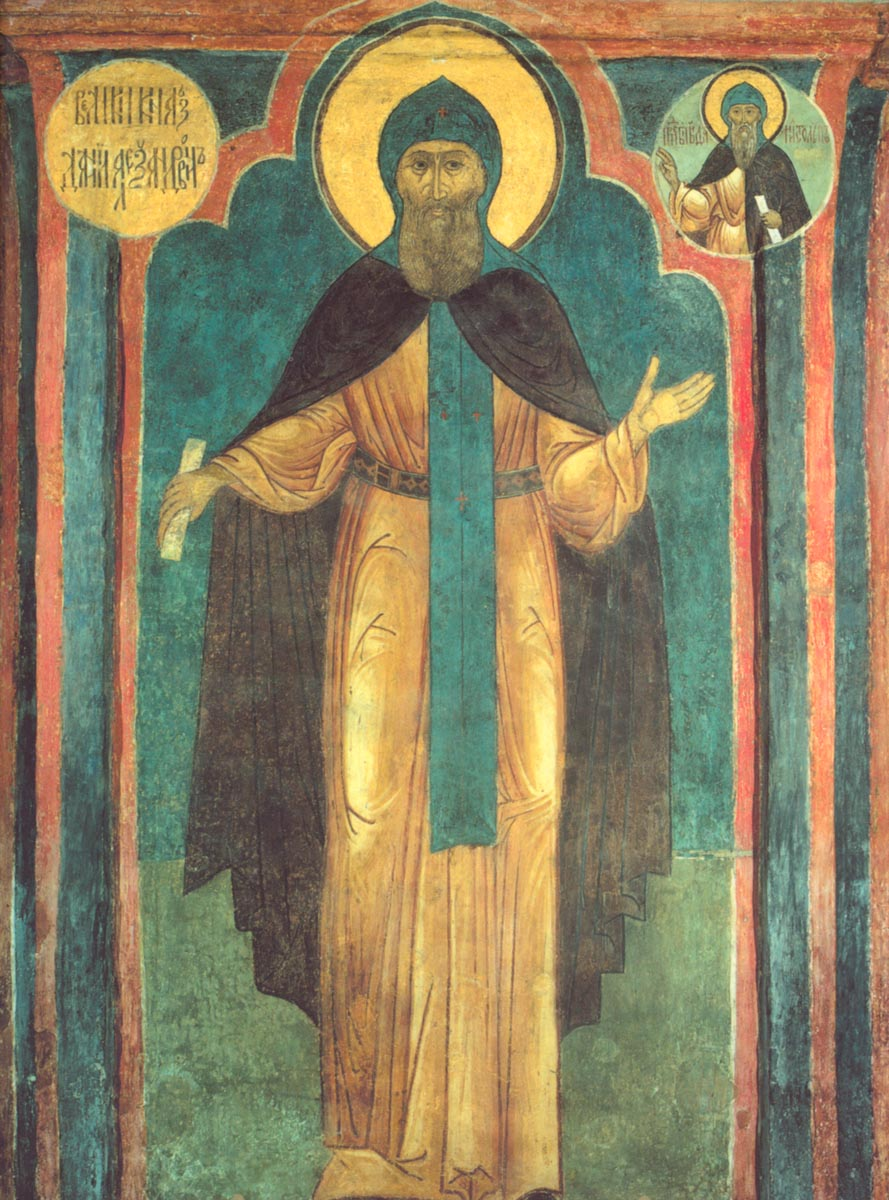
Saint Daniel of Moscow.

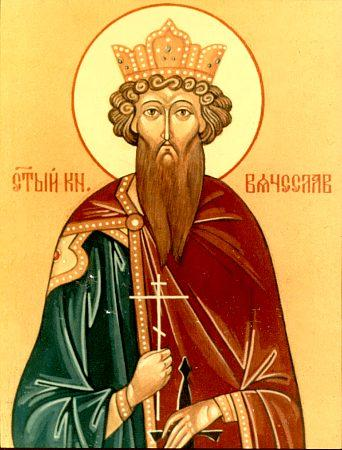
Martyr Wenceslaus (Vaclav), Prince of the Czechs

== Sources ==
- March 4/March 17. Orthodox Calendar (PRAVOSLAVIE.RU).
- March 17 / March 4. HOLY TRINITY RUSSIAN ORTHODOX CHURCH (A parish of the Patriarchate of Moscow).
- March 4. OCA - The Lives of the Saints.
- The Autonomous Orthodox Metropolia of Western Europe and the Americas (ROCOR). St. Hilarion Calendar of Saints for the year of our Lord 2004. St. Hilarion Press (Austin, TX). p. 19.
- March 4. Latin Saints of the Orthodox Patriarchate of Rome.
- The Roman Martyrology. Transl. by the Archbishop of Baltimore. Last Edition, According to the Copy Printed at Rome in 1914. Revised Edition, with the Imprimatur of His Eminence Cardinal Gibbons. Baltimore: John Murphy Company, 1916. p. 65.

Greek Sources

- Great Synaxaristes: (in Greek) 4 ΜΑΡΤΙΟΥ. ΜΕΓΑΣ ΣΥΝΑΞΑΡΙΣΤΗΣ.
- (in Greek) Συναξαριστής. 4 Μαρτίου. ECCLESIA.GR. (H ΕΚΚΛΗΣΙΑ ΤΗΣ ΕΛΛΑΔΟΣ).

Russian Sources

- (in Russian) 17 марта (4 марта). Православная Энциклопедия под редакцией Патриарха Московского и всея Руси Кирилла (электронная версия). (Orthodox Encyclopedia - Pravenc.ru).
- (in Russian) 4 марта (ст.ст.) 17 марта 2013 (нов. ст.). Русская Православная Церковь Отдел внешних церковных связей. (DECR).
