= February 20 (Eastern Orthodox liturgics) =

Day in the Eastern Orthodox liturgical calendar

Eastern Orthodox liturgical calendar
February 19	February 20	February 21
February 20 O.S. ≍ March 5 (or March 4 (Note: in a leap year)) N.S. February 20 N.S ≍ February 7 O.S.

An Eastern Orthodox cross

February 20 in Eastern Orthodox liturgical calendars is a feast day and a day of commemoration of saints and martyrs. Although some Orthodox churches use the Revised Julian Calendar and others use the traditional Julian calendar, the fixed commemorations for their respective February 20 are broadly the same, no matter which calendar is used. (Note: Despite the dates being the same, the days to which they refer typically differ by 13 days. The notation Old Style or O.S. is sometimes used to indicate a date in the traditional Julian Calendar (the "Old Calendar"). The notation New Style or N.S. indicates a date in the Revised Julian calendar (the "New Calendar").)

== Saints ==
- Hieromartyr Eleutherius of Byzantium, Bishop in Byzantium (136)
- Martyrs Didymos, Nemesios and Potamios, in Cyprus. (Note: "In the island of Cyprus, the holy martyrs Pothamius and Nemesius.")
- Saint Eutropius, martyr (308) (Note: His feast day is on March 3. It is unclear why he is listed here today.)
- Hieromartyr Sadoc of Persia (Sadoth), Bishop of Persia, and 128 Martyrs with him (343) (Note: "In Persia, in the time of king Sapor, the birthday of St. Sadoth, bishop, and one hundred and twenty-eight others, who refused to adore the sun, and by a cruel death purchased for themselves bright crowns.")(see also: October 19)
- Saint Anianus (Aninas).
- Venerable Bessarion the Great, Wonderworker of Egypt (466) (see also: June 6)
- Saint Agatho of Rome, Pope of Rome (682) (see also: January 10 - West)
- Saint Leo of Catania (Leo the Wonderworker), Bishop of Catania in Sicily (785) (Note: Kontakion. Second Tone. "With songs let us crown him who was dedicated to the Lord from infancy, and who from his swaddling bands received grace from God, even Leo, the luminary and defender of the Church; for he is her support.") (Note: "At Catania, in Sicily, St. Leo, bishop, illustrious for virtues and miracles.")
- Venerable Cindeus of Pisidia (Kindeos), Bishop of Pisidia.
- Venerable Plotinus, monk.

== Pre-Schism Western saints ==
- Saint Bolcan (Olcan), baptised by St Patrick, Bolcan later became Bishop of Derkan in Ireland (c. 480)
- Saint Valerius (Valier), first Bishop of Couserans in France (5th century?)
- Saint Falco of Maastricht, Bishop of Maastricht in the Netherlands (512)
- Saint Eleutherius of Tournai, Bishop of Tournai (531) (Note: "At Tournai, in Belgium, St. Eleutherius, bishop and confessor.") (Note: Born in Tournai in Belgium, he became bishop there in 486 and enlightened the pagan Franks who had settled nearby. He died from wounds inflicted by Arian heretics.)
- Saint Mildrith, Anglo-Saxon abbess of the Abbey at Minster-in-Thanet, Kent (c. 700) (Note: One of the three daughters of St Ermenburgh of Minster-in-Thanet in England. She succeeded her mother as Abbess of Thanet. Her relics were enshrined in Canterbury and part of them survive. Her life describes her as 'ever merciful, of easy temper and tranquil'.) (see also: July 13)
- Saint Eucherius of Orléans, Bishop of Orleans (c. 740) (Note: "The same day, St. Eucherius, bishop of Orleans, whose miracles increased in proportion to the slanders of the envious.") (Note: Born in Orleans in France, he became a monk at Jumièges near Rouen in about 714. In 721 he became Bishop of Orleans, opposing the theft of church lands by Charles Martel. For this he was exiled to Cologne in Germany in 737. Here he became very popular and so was sent to Liège in Belgium. He spent the rest of his life at the monastery of St Trond near Maastricht in the Netherlands.)
- Saint Colgan, called 'the Wise' and 'the Chief Scribe of the Irish' , he was Abbot of Clonmacnoise in Offaly in Ireland (c. 796)

== Post-Schism Orthodox saints ==
- Saint Yaroslav the Wise, Grand Prince of Kiev, son of the Varangian (Viking) Grand Prince Vladimir the Great (1054) (Note: St. Yaroslav the Wise was the builder of St Sophia Cathedral in Kyiv which, on September 21st, 2011, celebrated the 1,000th anniversary of its consecration.)
- Saint Agatho, Wonderworker of the Kiev Caves Monastery (13th–14th centuries) (Note: See also: (in Russian) Агафон Чудотворец. Википедии. (Russian Wikipedia).)
- Martyrdom of St. Cornelius, abbot of the Pskov-Caves Monastery, by beheading, and his disciple St. Bassian of Murom (1570) (Note: See also: (in Russian) Корнилий Псково-Печерский. Википедии. (Russian Wikipedia).)
- Venerable Martyrs 34 monks and novices of Valaam Monastery, martyred by the Lutherans (1578):

- Hieromonk Titus,
- Schemamonk Tikhon,
- Monks Gelasius, Sergius, Varlaam, Sabbas, Conon, Sylvester, Cyprian, Pimen, John, Samonas, Jonah, David, Cornelius, Niphon, Athanasius, and Serapion; and novices Varlaam, Athanasius, Anthony, Luke, Leontius, Thomas, Dionysius, Philip, Ignatius, Basil, Pachomius, Basil, Theophilus, John, Theodore, and John.

=== New martyrs and confessors ===
- New Hieromartyr Nicholas Rozov, Priest (1938)

== Icon gallery ==
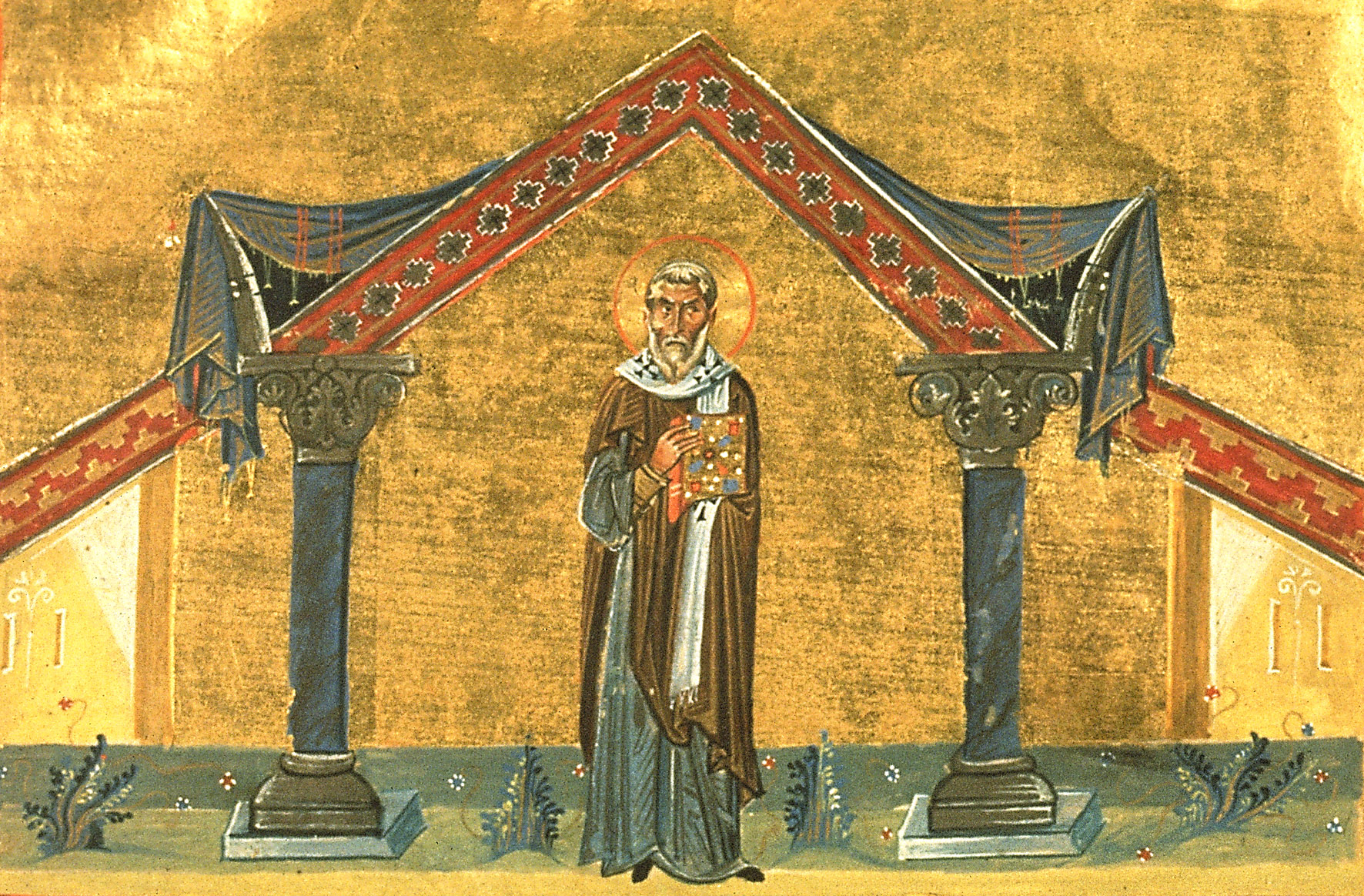
Saint Agatho of Rome, Pope of Rome.

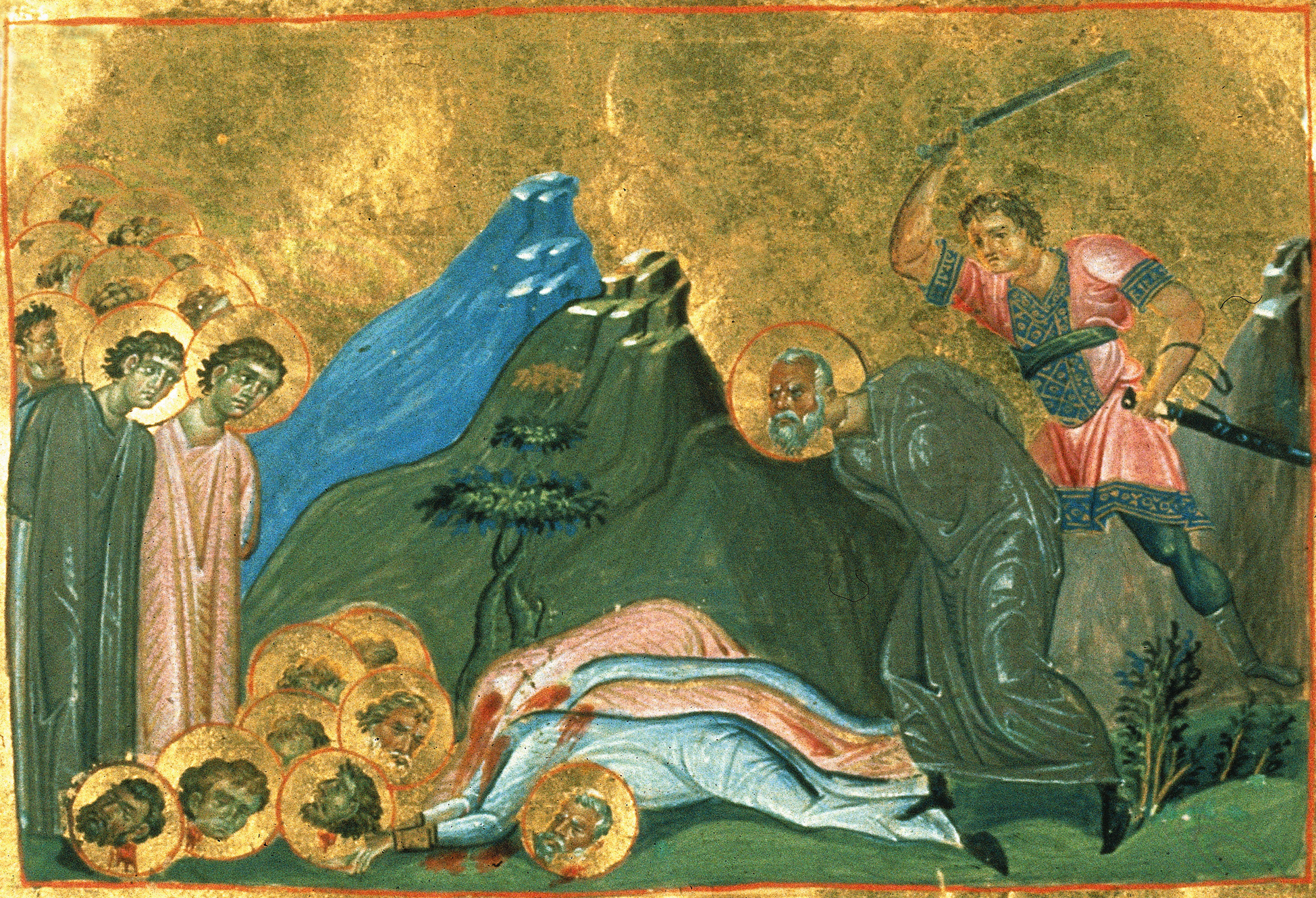
Hieromartyr Sadoc of Persia and 128 Martyrs with him.

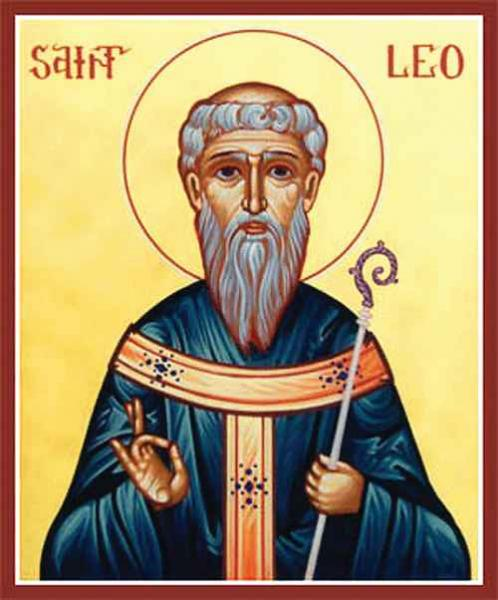
St Leo of Catania the Wonderworker.

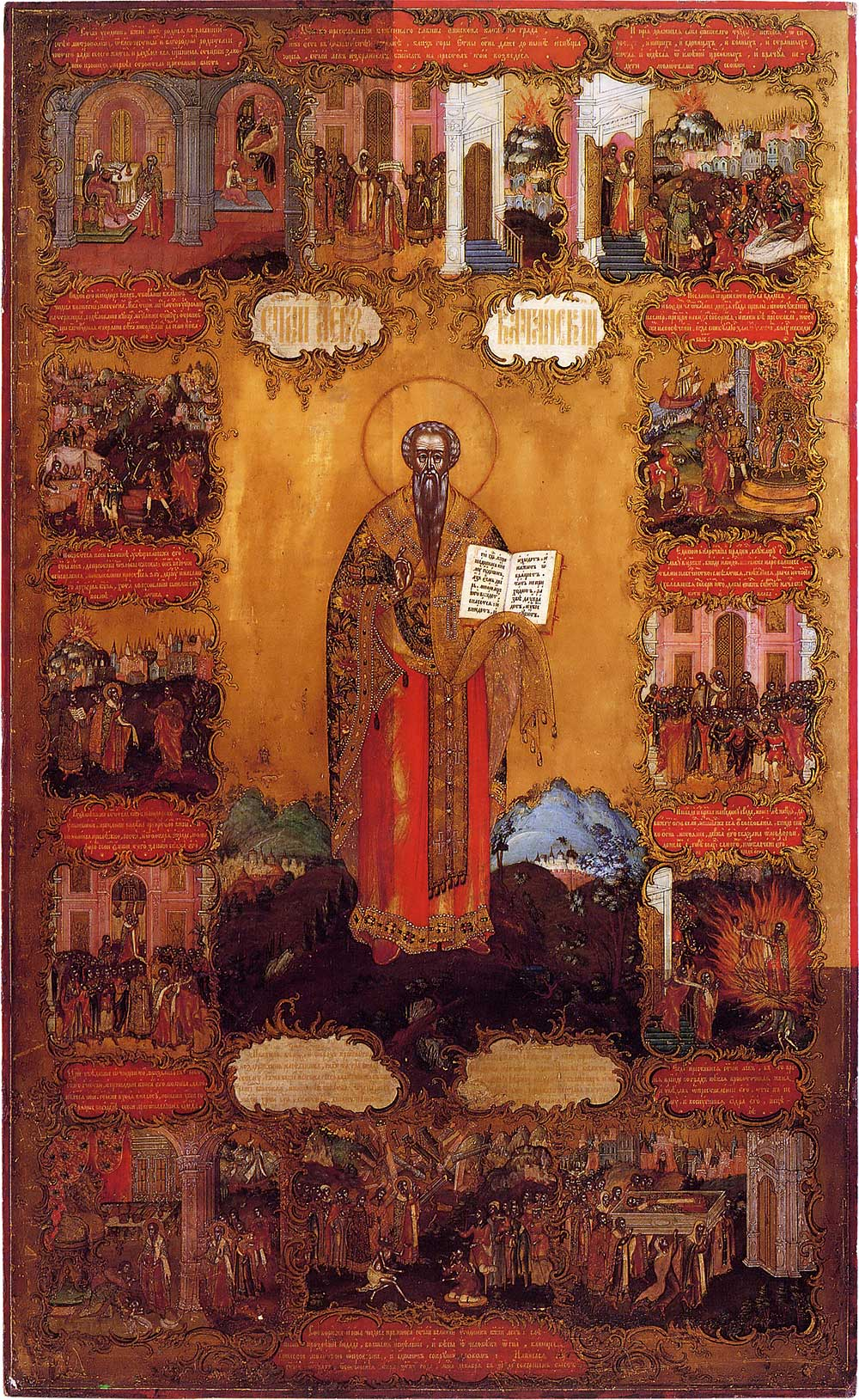
St Leo of Catania the Wonderworker.

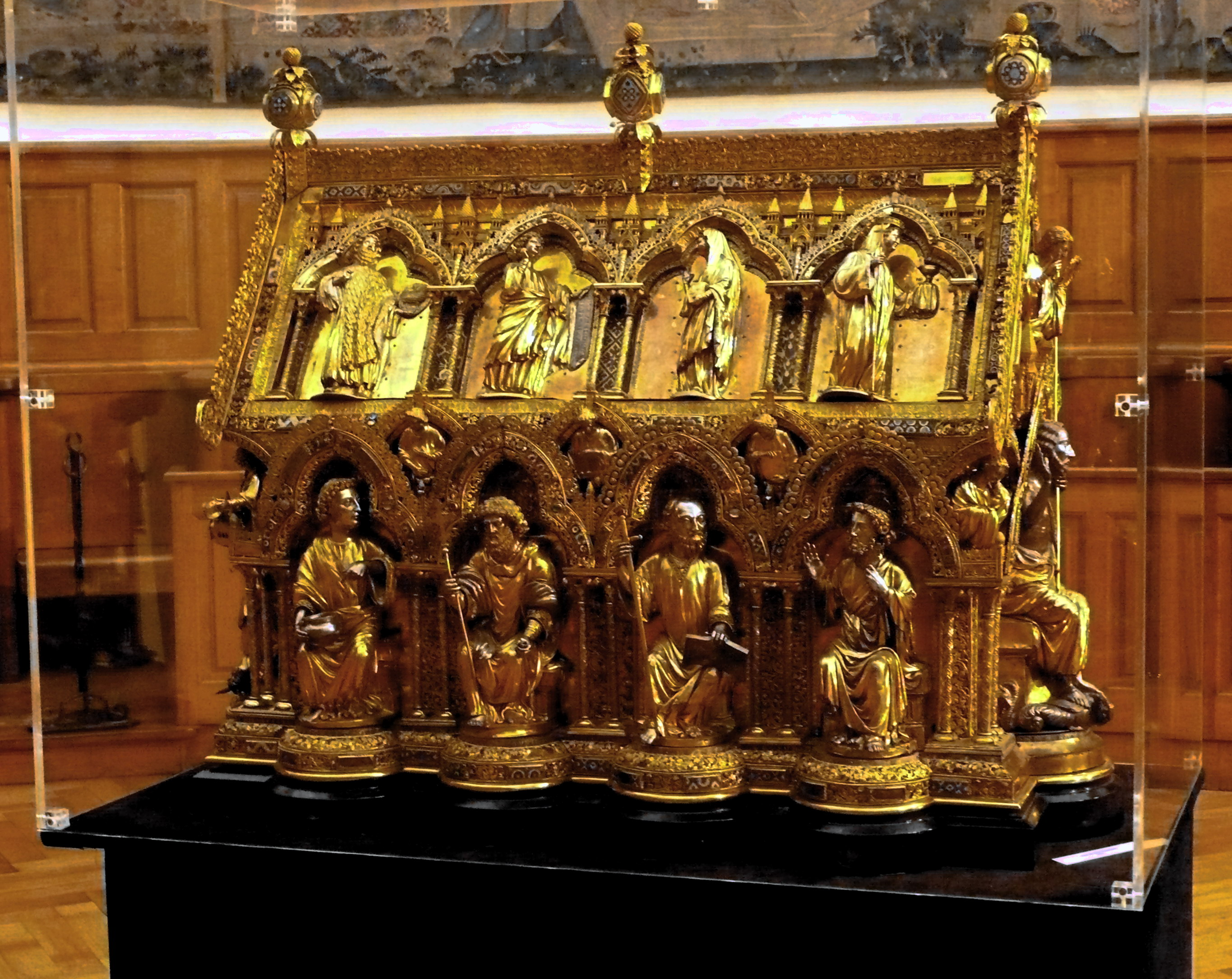
Reliquary shrine of St. Eleutherius of Tournai.

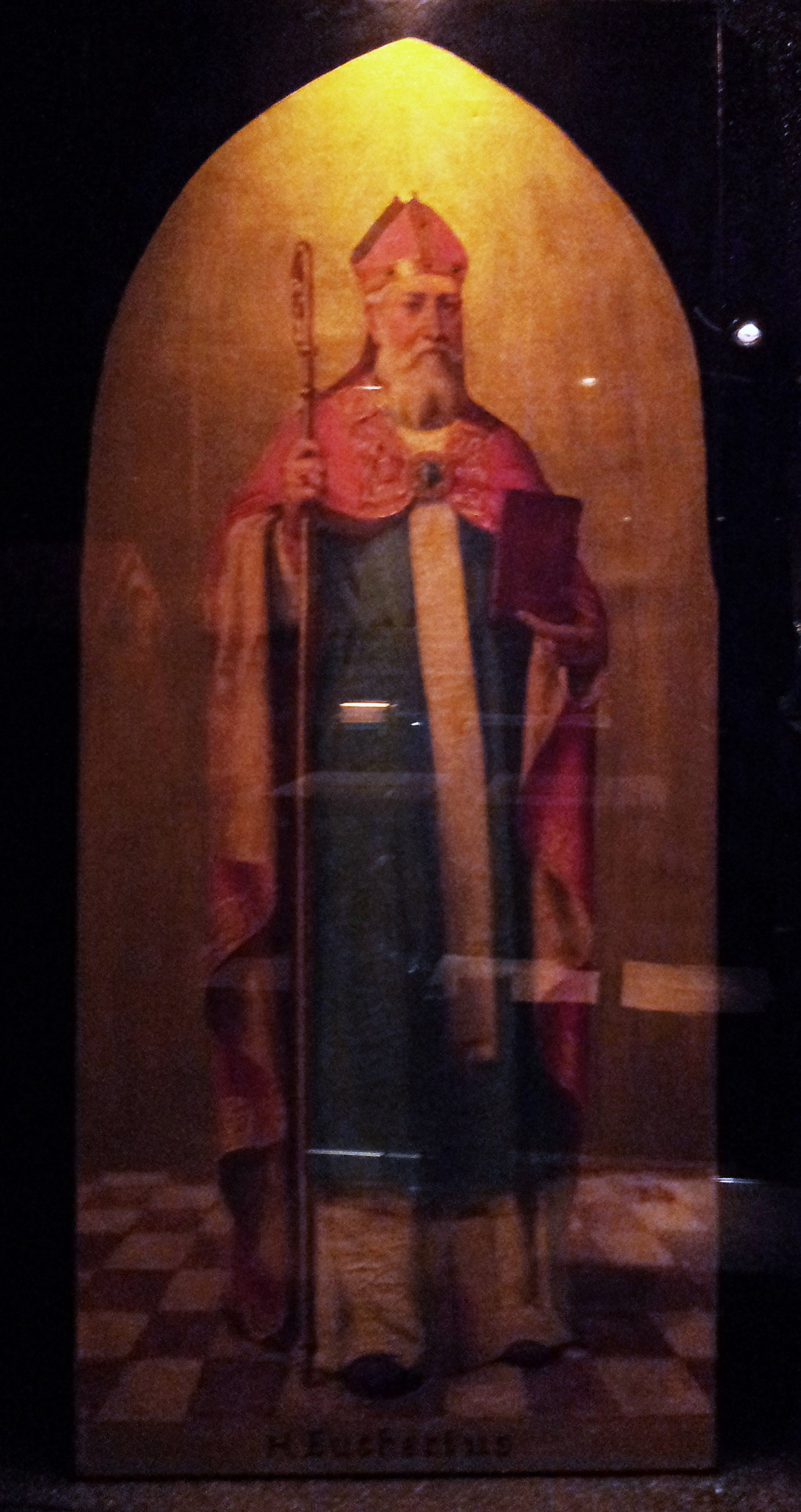
Saint Eucherius of Orléans.

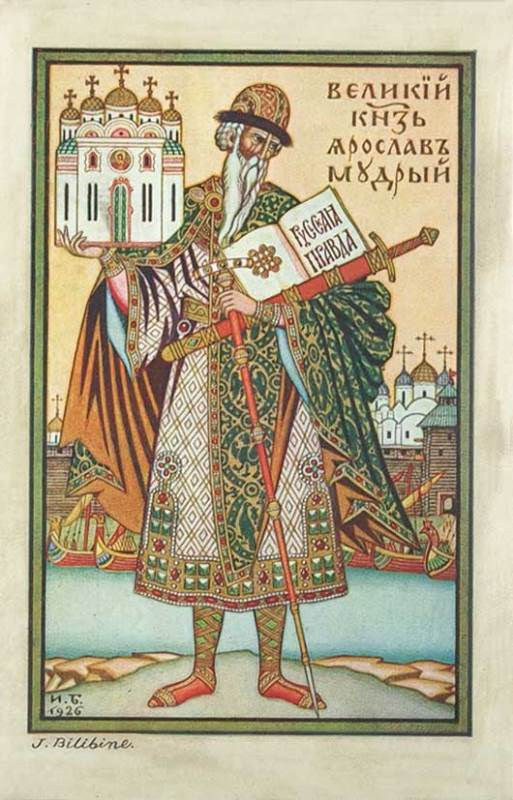
Saint Yaroslav the Wise.

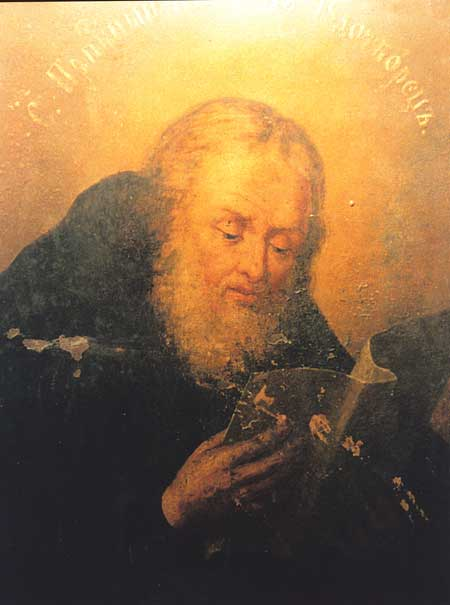
St. Agatho, Wonderworker of the Kyiv Caves Monastery.

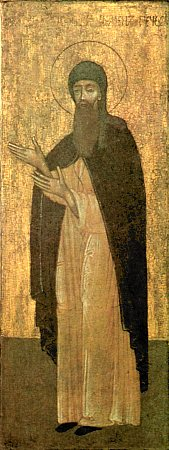
St. Cornelius, abbot of the Pskov-Caves Monastery.

== Sources ==
- February 20 / March 5. Orthodox Calendar (Pravoslavie.ru).
- March 5 / February 20. Holy Trinity Russian Orthodox Church (A parish of the Patriarchate of Moscow).
- February 20. OCA - The Lives of the Saints.
- The Autonomous Orthodox Metropolia of Western Europe and the Americas. St. Hilarion Calendar of Saints for the year of our Lord 2004. St. Hilarion Press (Austin, TX). p. 16.
- The Twentieth Day of the Month of February. Orthodoxy in China.
- February 20. Latin Saints of the Orthodox Patriarchate of Rome.
- The Roman Martyrology. Transl. by the Archbishop of Baltimore. Last Edition, According to the Copy Printed at Rome in 1914. Revised Edition, with the Imprimatur of His Eminence Cardinal Gibbons. Baltimore: John Murphy Company, 1916. pp. 53-54.
- Rev. Richard Stanton. A Menology of England and Wales, or, Brief Memorials of the Ancient British and English Saints Arranged According to the Calendar, Together with the Martyrs of the 16th and 17th Centuries. London: Burns & Oates, 1892. pp. 79-80.

=== Greek Sources ===
- Great Synaxaristes: (in Greek) 20 Φεβρουαρίου. Μεγασ Συναξαριστησ.
- (in Greek) Συναξαριστής. 20 Φεβρουαρίου. Ecclesia.gr. (H Εκκλησια τησ Ελλαδοσ).

=== Russian Sources ===
- (in Russian) 5 марта (20 февраля). Православная Энциклопедия под редакцией Патриарха Московского и всея Руси Кирилла (электронная версия). (Orthodox Encyclopedia - Pravenc.ru).
- (in Russian) 20 февраля (ст.ст.) 5 марта 2014 (нов. ст.). Русская Православная Церковь Отдел внешних церковных связей. (Decr).
