= March 6 (Eastern Orthodox liturgics) =

Day in the Eastern Orthodox liturgical calendar

Eastern Orthodox liturgical calendar
March 5	March 6	March 7
March 6 O.S. ≍ March 19 N.S. March 6 N.S ≍ February 21 (or February 22 (Note: in a leap year)) O.S.

An Eastern Orthodox cross

March 6 in Eastern Orthodox liturgical calendars is a feast day and a day of commemoration of saints and martyrs. Although some Orthodox churches use the Revised Julian Calendar and others use the traditional Julian calendar, the fixed commemorations for their respective March 6 are broadly the same, no matter which calendar is used. (Note: Despite the dates being the same, the days to which they refer typically differ by 13 days. The notation Old Style or O.S. is sometimes used to indicate a date in the traditional Julian Calendar (the "Old Calendar"). The notation New Style or N.S. indicates a date in the Revised Julian calendar (the "New Calendar").)

== Saints ==
- Monk-martyrs Conon, and his son Conon, of Iconium (270–275)
- Martyrs Cyriacus and 12 companions, who suffered under Diocletian in Augsburg (c. 304)
- Martyr Euphrosynus, in boiling water.
- Monk-martyr Maximus, by stoning.
- Uncovering of the Precious Cross and the Precious Nails by the Empress St Helena in Jerusalem (326)
- Venerable Arcadius, monk of Cyprus (361), and his disciples Julian and Euboulos.
- Saint Arkadios, Archbishop of Cyprus (527–565)
- Venerable Hesychius the Wonderworker. (Note: In the year 781 AD his relics were translated to Amasya by Bishop Theofylaktos of Amasea, who placed the sacred relics on the right side of the altar.) (see also: March 5)
- The holy 42 Martyrs of Amorium (in Phrygia), including:

- Passion-bearers Constantine, Aetius, Theophilus, Theodore, Melissenus, Callistus, Basoes, and others, in Samarra (845)

== Pre-Schism Western saints ==
- Saint Marcian of Tortona (120) (Note: By tradition he was a disciple of St Barnabas and the first Bishop of Tortona in Piedmont in Italy, where he was martyred under Hadrian after an episcopate of forty-five years.)
- Saint Patrick of Avernia (ca. 307) (Note: Born in Malaga in Spain, he became Bishop there. He later fled to Auvergne in France.)
- Saint Basil of Bologna, Bishop of Bologna in Italy for twenty years, 315-335 (335)
- Saint Fridolin of Säckingen, abbot, Enlightener of the Upper Rhine (540) (Note: Born in Ireland, he became a monk at Luxeuil in France. Later he founded the monastery of Sackingen and is venerated as the Apostle of the Upper Rhine in Germany.)
- Saints Kyneburga, Kyneswide and Tibba, female members of the Mercian royal family in 7th century England (c. 680) (Note: Cyneburgh, Cyneswith and Tibba. Cyneburgh and Cyneswith were daughters of Penda of Mercia in England, who was notorious for his opposition to Orthodoxy. The former founded a convent in Castor in Northamptonshire and was followed as abbess by her sister. Tibba was a relative who joined them at the convent. Their relics were enshrined together.)
- Saint Baldred of Tyninghame (Balther), a priest in Lindisfarne in England who became a hermit at Tyningham on the Scottish border (756)
- Saint Chrodegang of Metz, Bishop of Metz in the east of France, he took part in several Councils (766) (Note: He introduced the Roman Liturgy and singing into his diocese and the north of Europe in general.)
- Saint Bilfrid (Billfrith), a hermit at Lindisfarne and an expert goldsmith, who bound in gold the Lindisfarne Gospels, written and illuminated by Bishop Edfrith (8th century) (Note: He is listed on February 19th in Stanton: "BlLFRlD, before he quitted the world to embrace the life of an anchorite, had exercised the craft of a goldsmith. No particulars have reached us of his virtues and acts as a solitary, nor do we know the place of his retreat; but he was venerated as a Saint during his life and after his death. By command of St. Ethelwold, he employed his skill in nobly adorning the Gospels of St. Cuthbert with gold and precious stones. Moreover, when this much-prized volume accidentally fell into the sea, at the time of the translation of Cuthbert's relics, it was attributed to the intercession of St. Bilfrid, as well as other Saints, that the sacred treasure was miraculously recovered. The relics of St. Bilfrid, with those of other Saints, were translated to Durham, in obedience to the vision of the priest Elfred.")
- Saint Cathróe of Metz (Cadroe, Cadroel) (976) (Note: Born in Scotland, he lived in Armagh in Ireland. He went to France and lived as a monk at Fleury. He then became Abbot of Waulsort on the Meuse in Belgium and finally lived in Metz.)

== Post-Schism Orthodox saints ==
- Venerable Job (Joshua in schema) of Anzersk Island, Solovki (1720)

== Other commemorations ==
- Translation to Vladimir (1230) of the relics of Martyr Abraham of the Bulgars on the Volga (1229)
- Repose of Helen Kontzevitch, Church writer (1989)

=== Icons ===
- "Chenstokhovskaya" (Poland) Icon of the Most Holy Theotokos (Black Madonna of Częstochowa). (Note: "The famous Black Madonna was originally a gift from Byzantium to the royal court of Kyiv and was later taken by the Polish prince Vladislav Opolskie from Belz to Częstochowa, but miraculous copies abound in Kyiv and many other places in Ukraine (e.g. Turkovetske and Hoshiv). In the 15th century, St Theodore Ostrozhky – then a soldier fighting the Poles – was in Czestochowa during peace negotiations when he saw the Black Madonna at her shrine. Considering it an icon of Kyivan Rus’ that was stolen by the Poles, he tried to remove the icon to take it back to Ukraine with him. He was arrested on charges of “blasphemy” and during his trial told the Polish court that this icon was originally “of Rus’” and that he intended to bring it home to Ukraine where it belonged. He later became a monk and saint of the Kyiv Caves Lavra.")
- "Blessed Heaven" (Moscow) Icon of the Most Holy Theotokos.
- The Shestokhovsk ("Hearth"), or Sheltomezhsk, Icon of the Mother of God (18th century) (Note: In the year 1887, in honour of the wonderworking icon, in the village of Sheltomezha was founded the Shestokhovsk Ascension women's monastery.)

== Icon gallery ==
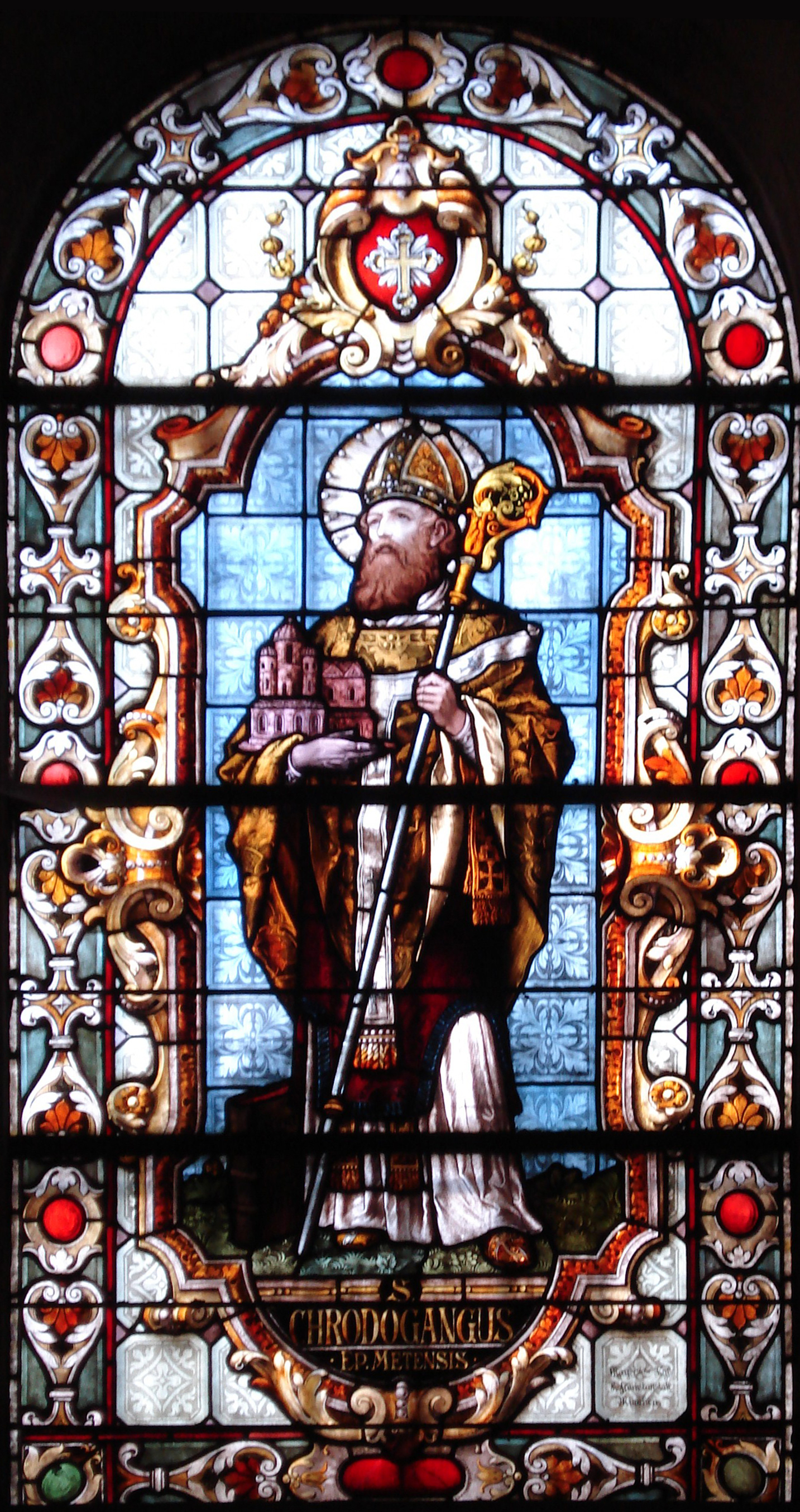
St. Chrodegang of Metz.

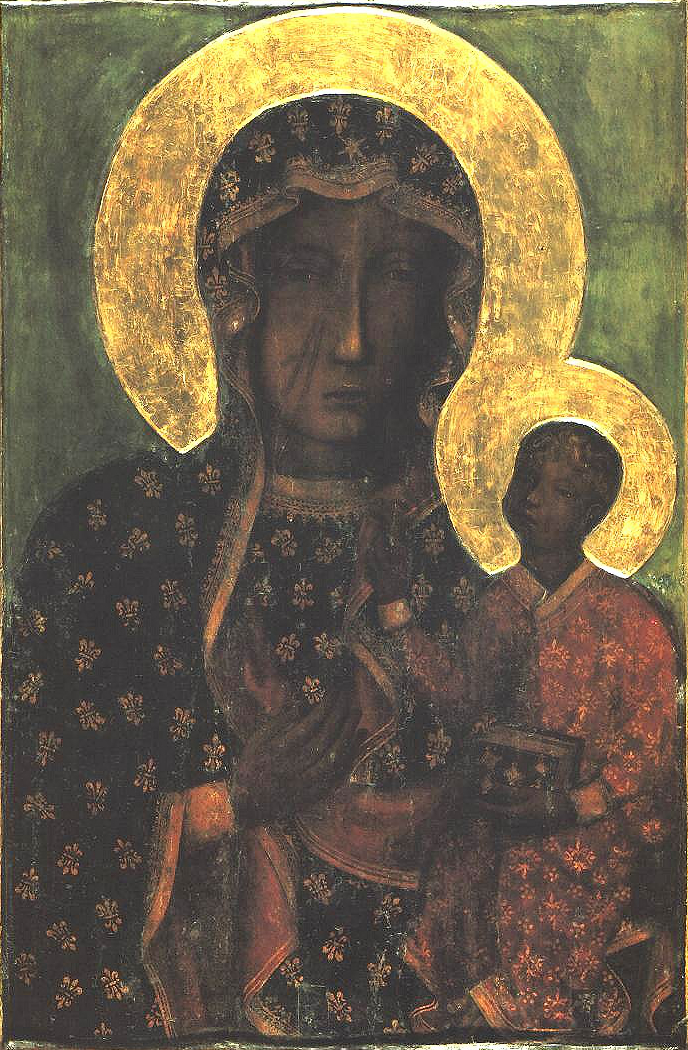
Icon of the Most Holy Theotokos "Of Czestochowa" (Black Madonna).

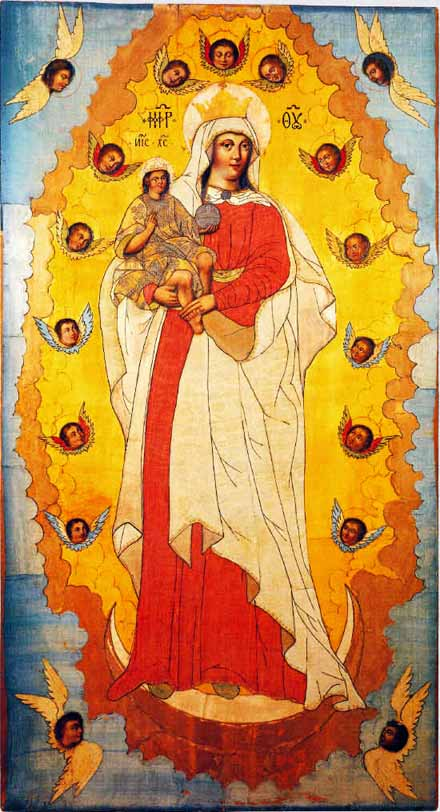
"Blessed Heaven" (Moscow) Icon of the Most Holy Theotokos.

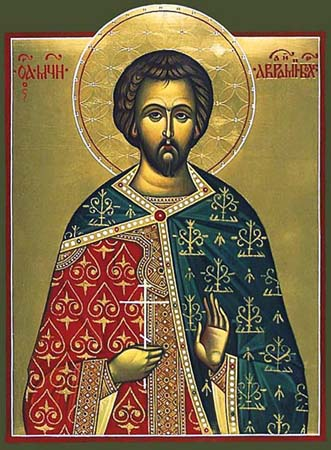
Martyr Abraham of Bulgaria.

== Sources ==
- March 6/March 19. Orthodox Calendar (PRAVOSLAVIE.RU).
- March 19 / March 6. HOLY TRINITY RUSSIAN ORTHODOX CHURCH (A parish of the Patriarchate of Moscow).
- March 6. OCA - The Lives of the Saints.
- The Autonomous Orthodox Metropolia of Western Europe and the Americas (ROCOR). St. Hilarion Calendar of Saints for the year of our Lord 2004. St. Hilarion Press (Austin, TX). pp. 19–20.
- March 6. Latin Saints of the Orthodox Patriarchate of Rome.
- The Roman Martyrology. Transl. by the Archbishop of Baltimore. Last Edition, According to the Copy Printed at Rome in 1914. Revised Edition, with the Imprimatur of His Eminence Cardinal Gibbons. Baltimore: John Murphy Company, 1916. pp. 67–68.
- Rev. Richard Stanton. A Menology of England and Wales, or, Brief Memorials of the Ancient British and English Saints Arranged According to the Calendar, Together with the Martyrs of the 16th and 17th Centuries. London: Burns & Oates, 1892. pp. 102–105.

Greek Sources

- Great Synaxaristes: (in Greek) 6 ΜΑΡΤΙΟΥ. ΜΕΓΑΣ ΣΥΝΑΞΑΡΙΣΤΗΣ.
- (in Greek) Συναξαριστής. 6 Μαρτίου. ECCLESIA.GR. (H ΕΚΚΛΗΣΙΑ ΤΗΣ ΕΛΛΑΔΟΣ).

Russian Sources

- (in Russian) 19 марта (6 марта). Православная Энциклопедия под редакцией Патриарха Московского и всея Руси Кирилла (электронная версия). (Orthodox Encyclopedia - Pravenc.ru).
- (in Russian) 6 марта (ст.ст.) 19 марта 2013 (нов. ст.). Русская Православная Церковь Отдел внешних церковных связей. (DECR).
