= March 3 (Eastern Orthodox liturgics) =

Day in the Eastern Orthodox liturgical calendar

Eastern Orthodox liturgical calendar
March 2	March 3	March 4
March 3 O.S. ≍ March 16 N.S. March 3 N.S ≍ February 18 (or February 19 (Note: in a leap year)) O.S.

An Eastern Orthodox cross

March 3 in Eastern Orthodox liturgical calendars is a feast day and a day of commemoration of saints and martyrs. Although some Orthodox churches use the Revised Julian Calendar and others use the traditional Julian calendar, the fixed commemorations for their respective March 3 are broadly the same, no matter which calendar is used. (Note: Despite the dates being the same, the days to which they refer typically differ by 13 days. The notation Old Style or O.S. is sometimes used to indicate a date in the traditional Julian Calendar (the "Old Calendar"). The notation New Style or N.S. indicates a date in the Revised Julian calendar (the "New Calendar").)

== Saints ==
- Martyrs Eutropius and Cleonicus of Amasea, and Basiliscus of Comana (308)
- Venerable Piama, virgin (337)
- Hieromartyr Theodoretus, Bishop, of Antioch, by beheading (361-363)
- Venerable Alexandra of Alexandria (4th century)
- Venerable Saints Zenon and Zoilus.
- Venerable Shio Mgvime, monk, of Georgia (6th century) (Note: The Georgian Orthodox Church commemorates St. Shio of Mgvime several times throughout the year: St. John of Zedazeni and his twelve disciples, among whom was St. Shio of Mgvime, are commemorated on May 7; the repose of St. Shio is celebrated on May 9; and on Cheese-fare Thursday the Church celebrates the miracle that, for centuries, occurred every year at St. Shio’s grave.)
- Saint John IV (Chrysostom), Catholicos of Georgia (1001)
- Saint John V (Chrysostom), Catholicos of Georgia (1048)

== Pre-Schism Western saints ==
- Martyrs Marinus and Asterius
- Martyrs Hemeterius and Cheledonius, believed to have been soldiers, suffered in Calahorra in Old Castile (ca. 298)
- Saint Camilla, born in Civitavecchia, she became a disciple of St Germanus of Auxerre in France, where she lived as an anchoress (ca. 437)
- Martyrs Felix, Luciolus, Fortunatus, Marcia and Companions, a group of forty martyrs in North Africa.
- Saint Winwaloe, Abbot of Landévennec Abbey, Brittany (ca. 530) (Note: Born in Brittany, he became a disciple of St Budoc on Lauren Island and founded the monastery at Landevennec. Several churches in Cornwall are dedicated to him, indicating that the saint had some connection there.) (Note: "This Saint appears to have been born in the Continental Brittany, where he flourished in great sanctity; but his parents were of Great Britain, and consequently in some parts of the island he was venerated as a Saint of the country. In some calendars we find on this day, or on the 26th of February, St. Winwalorus, Bishop, which, it is presumed, is an error of the copyist for Winwalocus, Abbot.")
- Saint Titian of Brescia, Germanic by birth, became Bishop of Brescia in Italy (ca. 536)
- Saint Caluppan of Auvergne in Gaul (576) (Note: A monk at Meallet in Auvergne in France, who lived as a hermit in a cave.)
- Saint Non (Nonnita, Nonna), mother of St. David of Wales (6th century) (Note: "ST. NONNITA, or NONNA, the mother of St. David, was the daughter of Brechan, Prince of North Wales, and, like all her brothers and several of her sisters, professed the religious state. On one occasion she left her retreat, on a pilgrimage of devotion, and was unhappily seized and exposed to the sacrilegious violence of one of the princes of the country. Thus she became the mother of the illustrious Saint, who was one of the glories of the ancient British Church. There was no doubt as to the innocence of Nonnita; but it was expressly revealed, as well as the sanctity of the child yet unborn, to St. Gildas the elder, as he was preaching in a church, when she was present. She continued for the rest of her days to lead a life of penance and devotion. A chapel was dedicated to her near the Cathedral of St. David's, and the three first days of March were days of special devotion in honour of her son St. David, his companion St. Lily, and herself. In Brittany it has been a constant tradition, that she ended her life in that country, and in the parish of Dirinon. The church of that place is dedicated to St. David and St. Nonnita, and there her relics are said to be preserved. It is said that the Saint's true name was Melarie, and that the surname of Nonna or Nun indicates her religious profession." A chapel and a well near her son's Cathedral still bear her name. Another can be found in Altarnum in Cornwall, where she may have moved and where her relics survived, even though she reposed in Brittany.)
- Saint Foila (Faile), sister of St Colgan (6th century) (Note: The two are patron-saints of the parishes of Kil-Faile (Kileely) and Kil-Colgan in County Galway in Ireland.)
- Saint Arthelais, one of the patron-saints of Benevento in Italy, where she fled from Constantinople (6th century)
- Saint Lamalisse (Molaise of Leighlin), a hermit in Scotland, he left his name to the islet of Lamlash off the coast of the Isle of Arran in Scotland (7th century)
- Saint Sacer (Mo-Sacra, Mosacra), founder of the monastery of Saggart near Dublin in Ireland (7th century)
- Saint Cele-Christ, otherwise "Worshipper of Christ", a hermit for many years, eventually forced to become a Bishop in Leinster (ca. 728)
- Saint Anselm, Abbott, founder of a monastery at Fanano, and the Nonantola Abbey (803) (Note: Of noble origin, Anselm became a monk and founded one monastery in Fanano near Modena in Italy and a second one in Nonantola. He attached hospitals and hostels to both.)
- Saint Cunigunde of Luxembourg, wife of Henry II, founder of Kaufungen Abbey (1039) (Note: "At Bamberg, the empress St. Cunegundes, who preserved her virginity with the consent of her husband, the emperor Henry I. She terminated a life rich in meritorius good deeds with a holy death and worked many miracles afterward.")

== Post-Schism Orthodox saints ==
- Holy 9 Martyrs of Georgia (Nine Brothers Kherkheulidze), at Marabda (1625) (see also: August 3)

=== New martyrs and confessors ===
- Virgin-martyr Martha Kovrova and martyr Michael Stroeva (1938)

== Other commemorations ==
- Our Lady of Gidle [Gidlanska, Gidelska] (1082)
- Synaxis of the Volokolamsk Icon of the Most Holy Theotokos (1572)
- Icon of the Mother of God "Zlatoustovskaya" (1848) (see also: November 27)
- Repose of Metropolitan Laurus (Shkurla) of the Russian Orthodox Church Outside of Russia (2008)

== Icon gallery ==
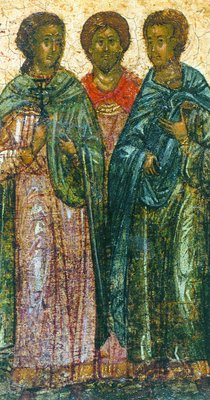
Martyrs Eutropius and Cleonicus of Amasea, and Basiliscus of Comana.

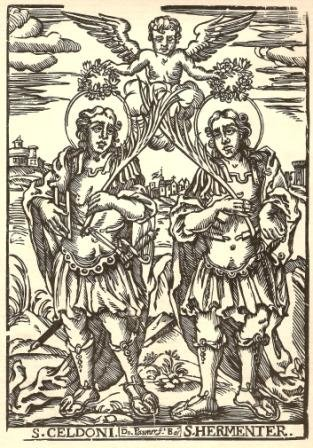
Martyrs Hemeterius and Cheledonius of Spain.

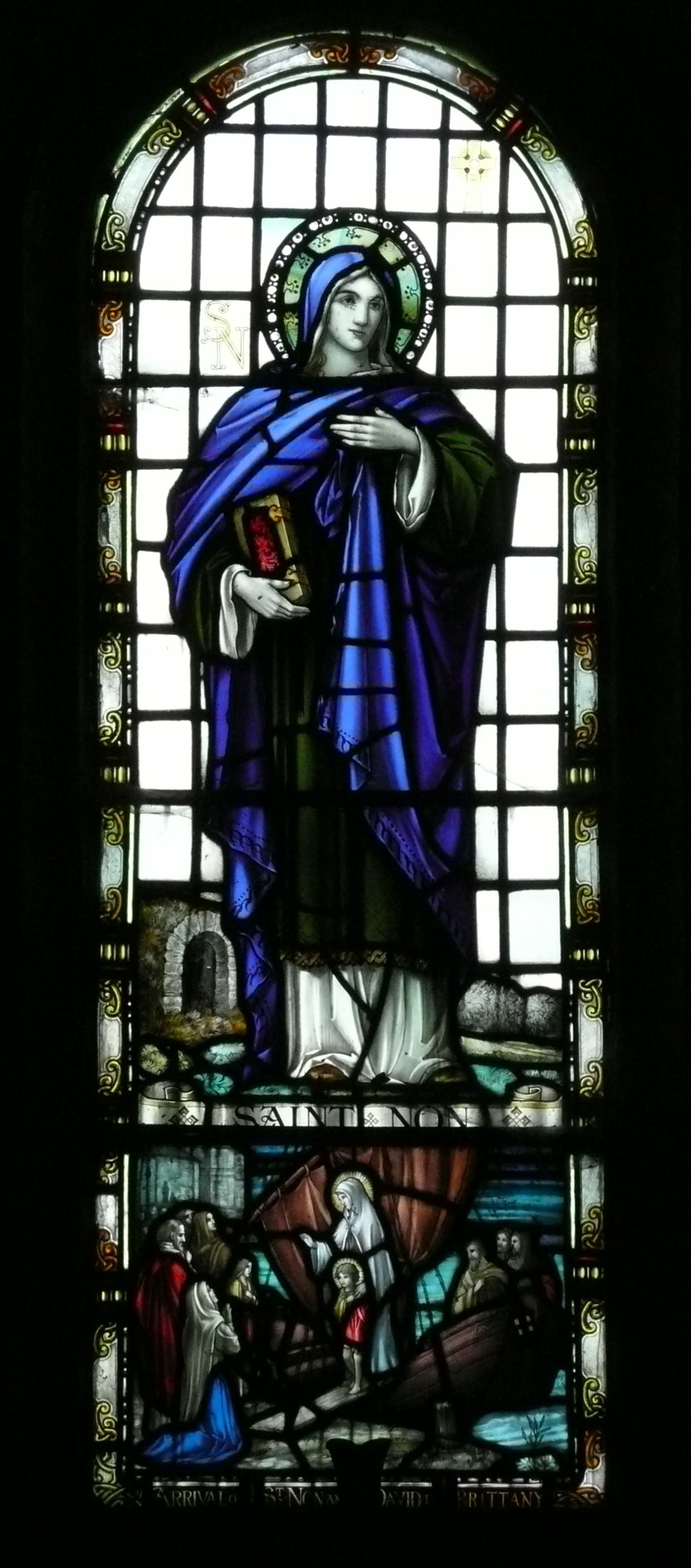
St. Saint Nonna, mother of St. David of Wales.

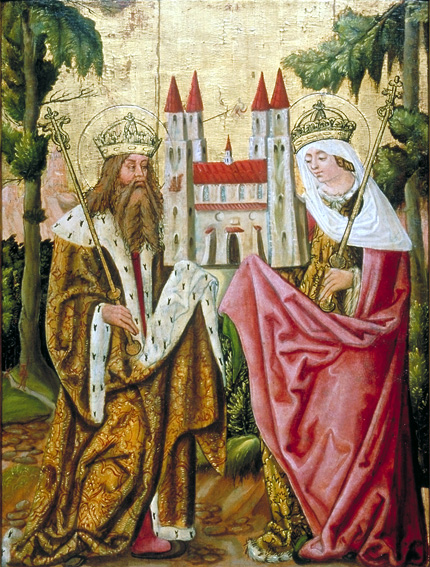
St. Henry II and St. Cunigunde of Luxembourg.

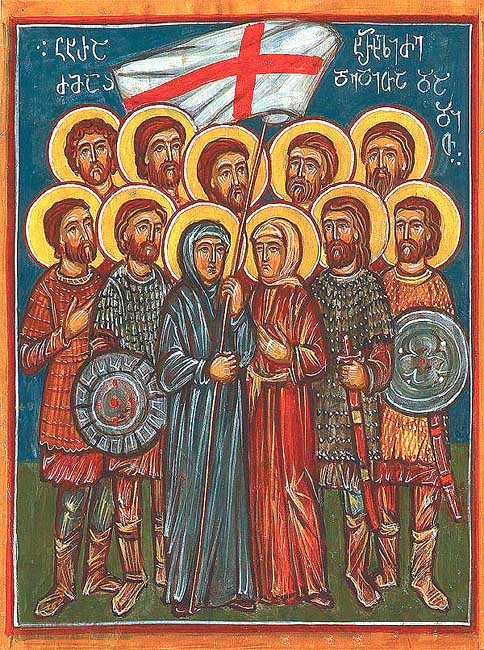
Icon of Nine Brothers Kherkheulidze with their Mother and Sister

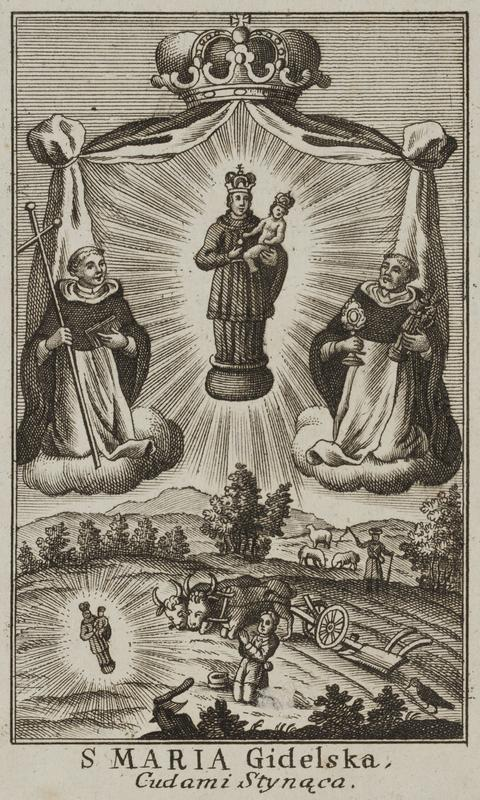
Our Lady of Gidle. (1082)

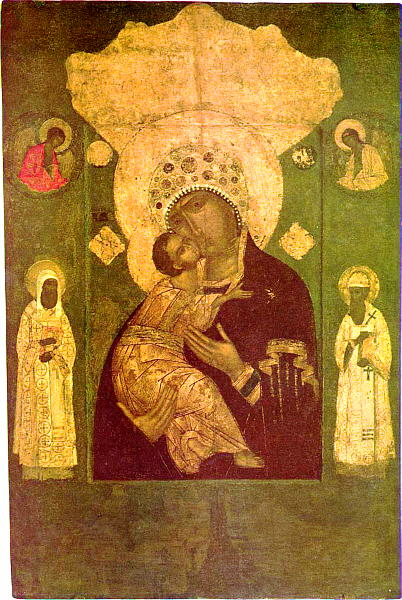
Volokolamsk Icon of the Most Holy Theotokos. (1572)

== Sources ==
- March 3/March 16. Orthodox Calendar (PRAVOSLAVIE.RU).
- March 16 / March 3. HOLY TRINITY RUSSIAN ORTHODOX CHURCH (A parish of the Patriarchate of Moscow).
- March 3. OCA - The Lives of the Saints.
- The Autonomous Orthodox Metropolia of Western Europe and the Americas (ROCOR). St. Hilarion Calendar of Saints for the year of our Lord 2004. St. Hilarion Press (Austin, TX). p. 19.
- March 3. Latin Saints of the Orthodox Patriarchate of Rome.
- The Roman Martyrology. Transl. by the Archbishop of Baltimore. Last Edition, According to the Copy Printed at Rome in 1914. Revised Edition, with the Imprimatur of His Eminence Cardinal Gibbons. Baltimore: John Murphy Company, 1916. pp. 64–65.
- Rev. Richard Stanton. A Menology of England and Wales, or, Brief Memorials of the Ancient British and English Saints Arranged According to the Calendar, Together with the Martyrs of the 16th and 17th Centuries. London: Burns & Oates, 1892. pp. 98–100.

Greek Sources

- Great Synaxaristes: (in Greek) 3 ΜΑΡΤΙΟΥ. ΜΕΓΑΣ ΣΥΝΑΞΑΡΙΣΤΗΣ.
- (in Greek) Συναξαριστής. 3 Μαρτίου. ECCLESIA.GR. (H ΕΚΚΛΗΣΙΑ ΤΗΣ ΕΛΛΑΔΟΣ).

Russian Sources

- (in Russian) 16 марта (3 марта). Православная Энциклопедия под редакцией Патриарха Московского и всея Руси Кирилла (электронная версия). (Orthodox Encyclopedia - Pravenc.ru).
- (in Russian) 3 марта (ст.ст.) 16 марта 2013 (нов. ст.). Русская Православная Церковь Отдел внешних церковных связей. (DECR).
