= February 21 (Eastern Orthodox liturgics) =

Day in the Eastern Orthodox liturgical calendar

Eastern Orthodox liturgical calendar
February 20	February 21	February 22
February 21 O.S. ≍ March 6 (or March 5 (Note: in a leap year)) N.S. February 21 N.S ≍ February 8 O.S.

An Eastern Orthodox cross

February 21 in Eastern Orthodox liturgical calendars is a feast day and a day of commemoration of saints and martyrs. Although some Orthodox churches use the Revised Julian Calendar and others use the traditional Julian calendar, the fixed commemorations for their respective February 21 are broadly the same, no matter which calendar is used. (Note: Despite the dates being the same, the days to which they refer typically differ by 13 days. The notation Old Style or O.S. is sometimes used to indicate a date in the traditional Julian Calendar (the "Old Calendar"). The notation New Style or N.S. indicates a date in the Revised Julian calendar (the "New Calendar").)

== Saints ==
- Saint Eustathius of Antioch, Archbishop of Antioch (337) (Note: Kontakion of the Hierarch. Plagal of Fourth Tone. "Since thou hadst wholly purified thyself with godly deeds, thou wast a notable example of a true high priest, while excelling in divine vision and a pure life. As a pillar and foundation of the Church of Christ, thou withstoodest all temptations with great steadfastness. Hence, we cry to thee: Rejoice, O Father Eustathius.")
- Hieromartyr Severian, Bishop of Scythopolis in Palestine (452) (Note: "At Scythopolis, in Palestine, St. Severian, bishop and martyr.")
- Venerable Andreas and Anatolios, monastics of the Church of Jerusalem, disciples of Venerable Euthymius the Great (5th century) (Note: Venerable Andreas originated from Mytilene and Venerable Anatolios was from Raithu.)
- Saint Maximianus of Ravenna, Bishop of Ravenna and Confessor (c. 556) (Note: Consecrated Bishop of Ravenna in Italy in 546, he built the Basilica of San Vitale, which was dedicated in the presence of the Emperor Justinian and his wife Theodora. Holding a jewelled cross, he is depicted in mosaics standing next to the Emperor.) (see also: February 22)
- Saint John Scholasticus, Patriarch of Constantinople (577)
- Saint Zachariah, Patriarch of Jerusalem (632) (Note: In the Jerusalem Canonarion he is listed on January 31 and October 28. Note that the "Commemoration of the Fall of Jerusalem in 614 AD to the Persians", which occurred during his tenure as Patriarch, takes place on May 17.)
- Venerable Timothy of Symbola on Mt. Olympus in Bithynia (795) (Note: Kontakion of the Righteous One. Fourth Tone. "Thou didst rise up from the East like a most bright star, shining with the splendour of the virtues of thy miracles within the hearts of all faithful men, O wonderworker of godly mind, Timothy.")
- Saint George of Amastris, Bishop of Amastris on the Black Sea (c. 805)

== Pre-Schism Western saints ==
- Saint Felix of Metz, third Bishop of Metz in France for over forty years (2nd century))
- Saint Severus and Sixty-Two Companions, martyrs in Syrmium in Pannonia (3rd-4th centuries)
- Saint Alexander of Adrumetum, martyred with others in North Africa (c. 434)
- Martyrs Verulus, Secundinus, Siricius, Felix, Servulus, Saturninus, Fortunatus and Companions, martyrs in North Africa, probably under the Vandals (c. 434) (Note: Hadrumetum is given as the place of their martyrdom and their number as twenty-six.) (Note: "At Adrumetum, in Africa, during the persecution of the Vandals, the holy martyrs Verulus, Secundinus, Syricius, Felix, Servulus, Saturninus, Fortunatus, and sixteen others, who were crowned with martyrdom for the confession of the Catholic faith.")
- Saint Paterius, a monk, disciple and friend of St Gregory the Great, he became Bishop of Brescia and was a prolific writer (606))
- Saint Pepin of Landen, Duke of Brabant, he was the husband of St Itta (Ida) of Metz and the father of St Bavo of Ghent, St Gertrude of Nivelles and St Begga (c. 646)
- Saint Ercongotha, daughter of King Erconbert of Kent and St Saxburgh, became a nun at Faremoutiers-en-Brie under her aunt, St Ethelburgh, but reposed very young (660)
- Saint Gundebert (Gumbert, Gondelbert), Bishop of Sens in France, later the founder of the monastery of Senones around 660 (c. 676)
- Saint Germanus of Granfelden, Abbot of Granfield in the Val Moutier in Switzerland, martyred with another monk, Randoald, while interceding for the poor (677)
- Saint Avitus II of Clermont, Bishop of Clermont in Auvergne, one of the great bishops of the age (689)
- Saint Valerius, a monk and Abbot of San Pedro de Montes, (Note: See: (in Spanish) Monasterio de San Pedro de Montes. Wikipedia. (Spanish Wikipedia).) he left several ascetic writings (695)

== Post-Schism Orthodox saints ==
- Saint Macarius, Hieroschemamonk of Glinsk Hermitage (1864)

=== New martyrs and confessors ===
- New Hieromartyrs Alexander Vislyansky, Daniel Alferov and Gregory Klebanov, Priests (1930)
- New Hieromartyr Constantine Pyatikrestovsky, Priest and Paul Shirokogorov, Deacon (1938)
- Virgin-Martyr Olga Koshelev (1939)

== Other commemorations ==
- "Kozelshchina" (Kolzelshchanskaya) Icon of the Most Holy Theotokos (1881) (Note: See: (in Russian) Козельщанская икона Божией Матери. Википедии. (Russian Wikipedia).)
- Repose of Blessed Simon (Todorsky), bishop of Pskov (1754) (see also: February 22)

== Icon gallery ==
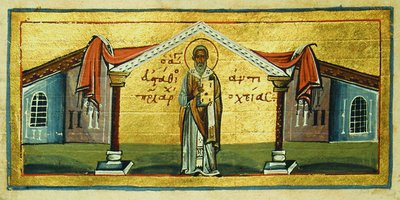
St. Eustathius of Antioch, Archbishop of Antioch.

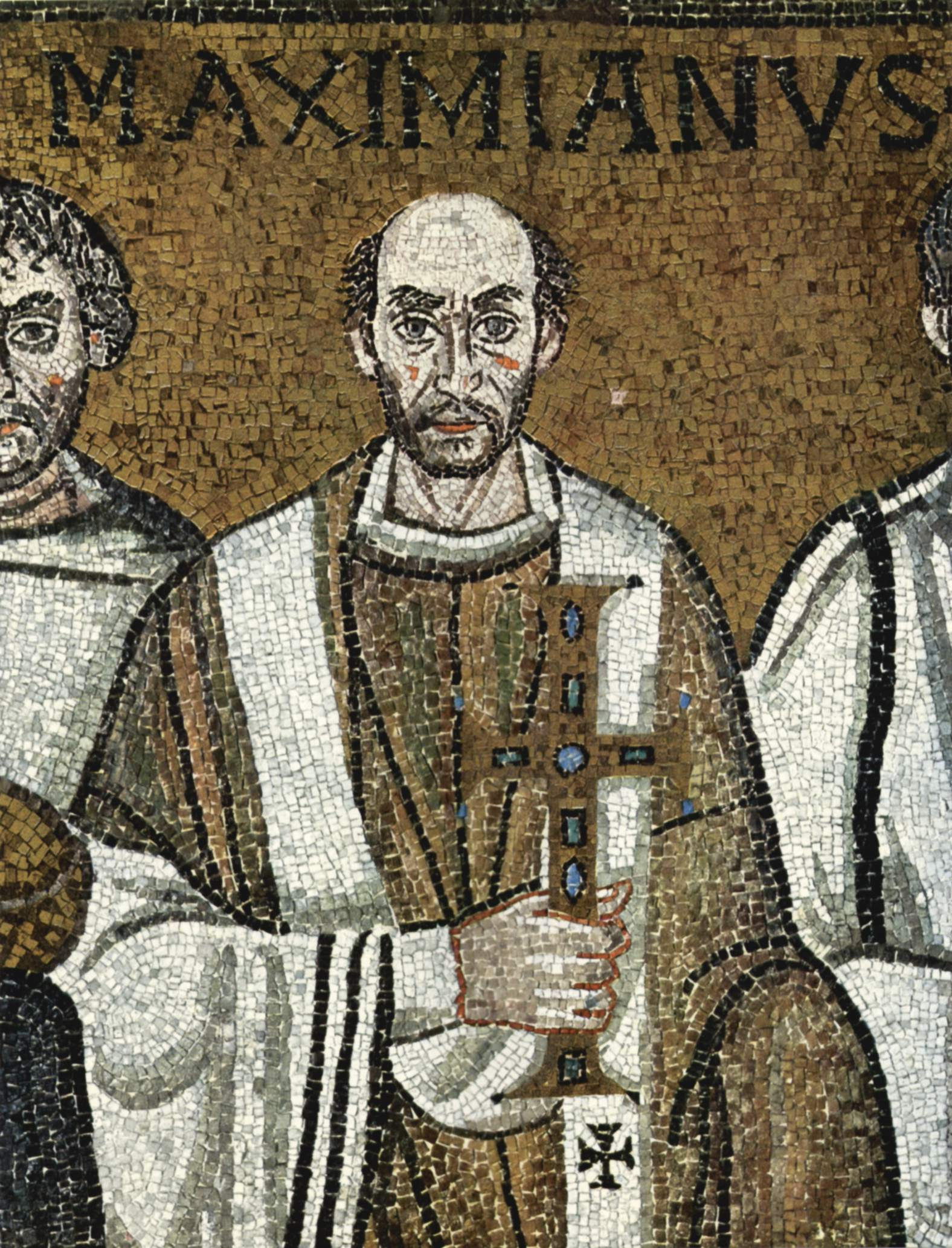
Saint Maximianus of Ravenna.

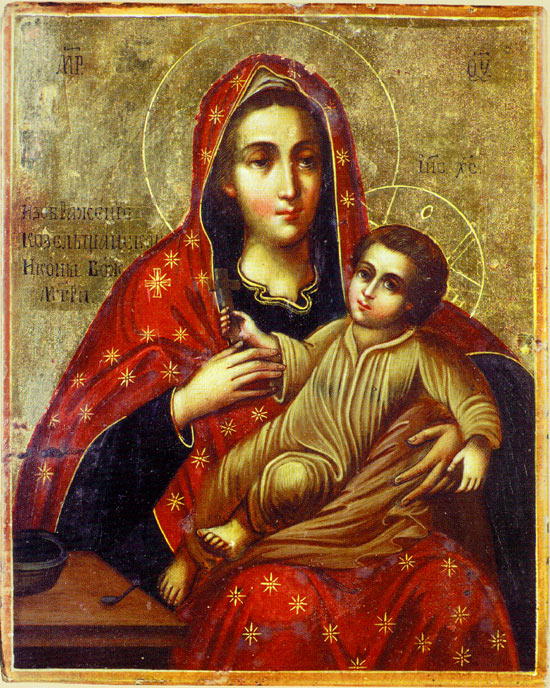
"Kozelshchina" (Kolzelshchanskaya) Icon of the Most Holy Theotokos.

== Sources ==
- February 21 / March 6. Orthodox Calendar (Pravoslavie.ru).
- March 6 / February 21. Holy Trinity Russian Orthodox Church (A parish of the Patriarchate of Moscow).
- February 21. OCA - The Lives of the Saints.
- The Autonomous Orthodox Metropolia of Western Europe and the Americas. St. Hilarion Calendar of Saints for the year of our Lord 2004. St. Hilarion Press (Austin, TX). pp. 16-17.
- The Twenty-First Day of the Month of February. Orthodoxy in China.
- February 21. Latin Saints of the Orthodox Patriarchate of Rome.
- The Roman Martyrology. Transl. by the Archbishop of Baltimore. Last Edition, According to the Copy Printed at Rome in 1914. Revised Edition, with the Imprimatur of His Eminence Cardinal Gibbons. Baltimore: John Murphy Company, 1916. pp. 54-55.
- Rev. Richard Stanton. A Menology of England and Wales, or, Brief Memorials of the Ancient British and English Saints Arranged According to the Calendar, Together with the Martyrs of the 16th and 17th Centuries. London: Burns & Oates, 1892. p. 80.

=== Greek Sources ===
- Great Synaxaristes: (in Greek) 21 Φεβρουαρίου. Μεγασ Συναξαριστησ.
- (in Greek) Συναξαριστής. 21 Φεβρουαρίου. Ecclesia.gr. (H Εκκλησια τησ Ελλαδοσ).

=== Russian Sources ===
- (in Russian) 6 марта (21 февраля). Православная Энциклопедия под редакцией Патриарха Московского и всея Руси Кирилла (электронная версия). (Orthodox Encyclopedia - Pravenc.ru).
- (in Russian) 21 февраля (ст.ст.) 6 марта 2014 (нов. ст.). Русская Православная Церковь Отдел внешних церковных связей. (Decr).
