= February 19 (Eastern Orthodox liturgics) =

Day in the Eastern Orthodox liturgical calendar

Eastern Orthodox liturgical calendar
February 18	February 19	February 20
February 19 O.S. ≍ March 4 (or March 3 (Note: in a leap year)) N.S. February 19 N.S ≍ February 6 O.S.

An Eastern Orthodox cross

February 19 in Eastern Orthodox liturgical calendars is a feast day and a day of commemoration of saints and martyrs. Although some Orthodox churches use the Revised Julian Calendar and others use the traditional Julian calendar, the fixed commemorations for their respective February 19 are broadly the same, no matter which calendar is used. (Note: Despite the dates being the same, the days to which they refer typically differ by 13 days. The notation Old Style or O.S. is sometimes used to indicate a date in the traditional Julian Calendar (the "Old Calendar"). The notation New Style or N.S. indicates a date in the Revised Julian calendar (the "New Calendar").)

== Saints ==
- Apostles Archippus and Philemon of the Seventy Apostles, and Martyr Apphia (1st century)
- Martyrs Maximus, Theodotus, Hesychius, and Asclepiodota of Adrianopolis (305-311)
- Venerable Saints Eugene and Macarius, Priests, Confessors at Antioch (363)
- Saint Mesrop the Translator, of Armenia (439) (see also: February 17 - Greek)
- Venerable Rabulas of Samosata (c. 530)
- Venerable Conon, Abbot in Palestine (555)
- Saint Dositheus of Gaza, disciple of Saint Abba Dorotheus (7th century)
- Venerable Sophronios, Bishop.

== Pre-Schism Western saints ==
- Saint Gabinus, a martyr in Rome who was related to the Emperor Diocletian, but also the brother of Pope Gaius, and father of the martyr St Susanna (c. 295) (Note: "AT Rome, the birthday of St. Gabinus, priest and martyr, brother of the blessed pope Caius. Being loaded with chains and kept a long time in prison by Diocletian, he obtained the joys of heaven by a precious death.")
- Saint Quodvultdeus, Bishop of Carthage in North Africa, exiled by the Arian Genseric King of the Vandals after the capture of the city in 439 (450)
- Saint Valerius (Valére), Bishop of Antibes in the south of France (c. 450)
- Saint Odran, ranks as the first Christian martyr in Irish history (c. 452)
- Saints Publius, Julian, Marcellus and Companions, martyrs in North Africa.
- Saint Barbatus of Benevento, took part in the Sixth Ecumenical Council in Constantinople at which Monothelitism was condemned (682) (Note: "At Benevento, St. Barbatus, a bishop illustrious for sanctity, who converted the Lombards and their chief to the faith of Christ.")
- Saint Mansuetus, Archbishop of Milan and Confessor, he wrote a treatise against Monothelitism (c. 690)
- Saint Beatus of Liébana, a monk at Liebana and was famous for his firm stand against Adoptionism (789) (Note: When Adoptionism was condemned, the saint went to the monastery of Valcavado and wrote his famous Commentary on the Apocalypse.)
- Saint George of Lodève, a monk at Saint-Foi-de-Conques in Rouergue but later moved to Vabres and became Bishop of Lodève (c. 884)

== Post-Schism Orthodox saints ==
- Saint Yaroslav the Wise, son of the Varangian (Viking) Grand Prince Vladimir the Great (1054) (see also: February 20 - Slavonic; and February 28)
- New Nun-martyr Philothea of Athens (1588) (Note: Name days celebrated today include: Philothei, Philothea (Φιλοθέη).)
- Saint Silvester of Alexandria, Pope and Patriarch of Alexandria from 1569 to 1590, a period of flourishing (1590) (Note: Saint Silvester of Alexandria was glorified by the Patriarchate of Alexandria on October 8, 2025. There is a supplicatory canon available in Greek to the saint, as well as a longer service.)
- Venerable Theodore, Abbot of Sanaxar Monastery (1791)
- New Hieromartyr Nicetas, Hieromonk, of Epirus and Mt. Athos, at Serres (1809) (see also: April 4)
- Saint Maria, desert-dweller of Olonets (1860) (see also: February 9)
- Saint Nikanor (Savić) the New, Abbot of Hilandar (1990) (Note: See: (in Serbian) Никанор Савић. Википедију. (Serbian Wikipedia).)

=== New martyrs and confessors ===
- New Hieromartyr Vladimir (Terentiev), Abbot, of Zosima Hermitage, Smolensk (1933)
- New Martyr Demetrius Volkov (1942)

== Other commemorations ==
- Icon of the Mother of God of Cyprus (392) (Note: The Cyprus Icon of the Mother of God. In this icon the Mother of God is depicted sitting on a throne with the Divine Infant in Her arms. There is an angel on either side of Her. The prototype of this holy icon manifested itself in the year 392 on the island of Cyprus at the tomb of Righteous Lazarus, the friend of Christ (October 17), and is kept there in a monastery. Renowned copies of the Cyprus Icon are at the Moscow’s Dormition Cathedral, and in the Nikolo-Golutvin church in the village of Stromyn, Moscow diocese (Commemorated on the Sunday of Orthodoxy). Other days commemorating the Cyprus Icon are the Day of the Holy Spirit, April 20, and July 9. Some copies of the Cyprus Icon have additional names such as "Cleansing," "Knife," and "Hawk.") (see also: February 16)

== Icon gallery ==
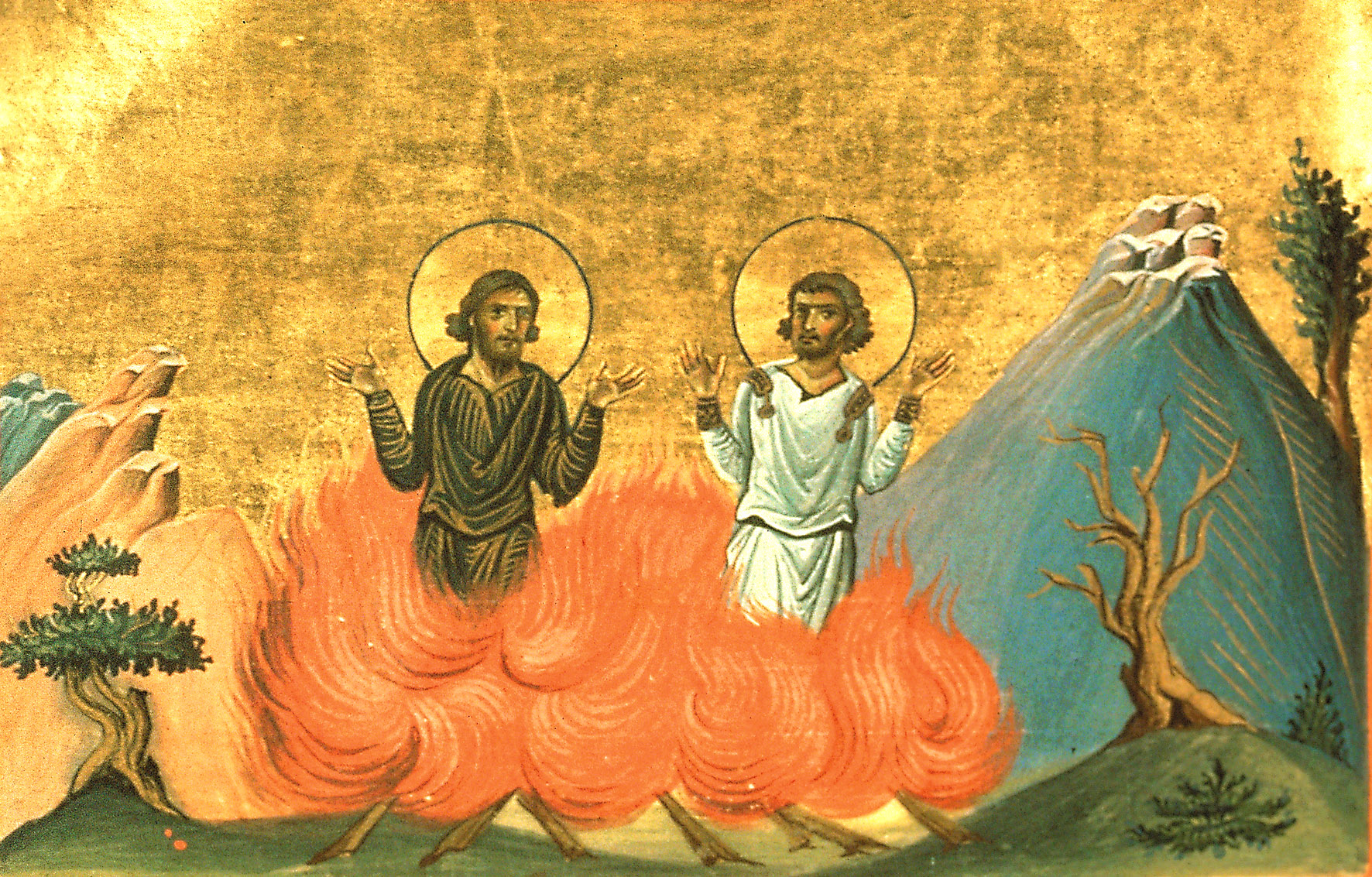
Martyrs Maximus and Theodotus, of Adrianopole.
(Menologion of Basil II, 10th century).

Saints Eugene and Macarius, Priests, Confessors at Antioch.
(Menologion of Basil II, 10th century).

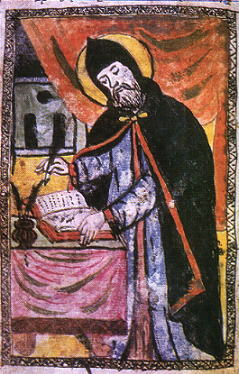
Saint Mesrop the Translator of Armenia.

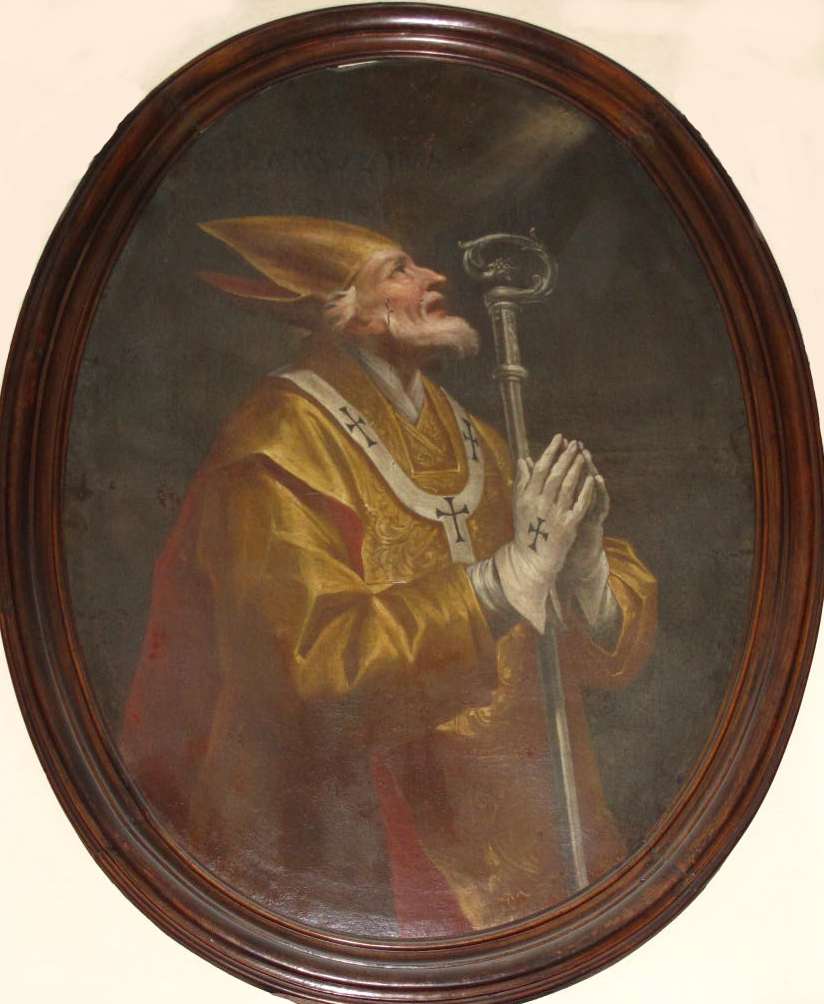
Saint Mansuetus, Bishop of Milan.

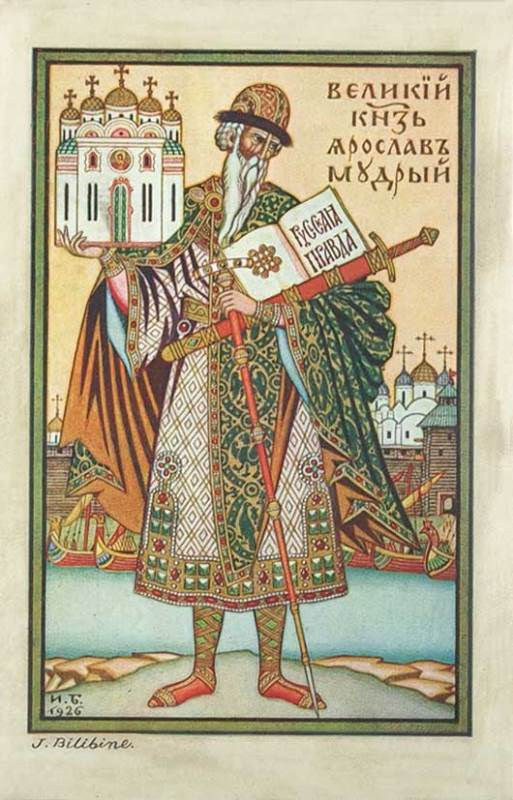
Saint Yaroslav the Wise.

New Nun-martyr Philothea of Athens.

== Sources ==
- February 19 / March 4. Orthodox Calendar (Pravoslavie.ru).
- March 4 / February 19. Holy Trinity Russian Orthodox Church (A parish of the Patriarchate of Moscow).
- February 19. OCA - The Lives of the Saints.
- The Autonomous Orthodox Metropolia of Western Europe and the Americas. St. Hilarion Calendar of Saints for the year of our Lord 2004. St. Hilarion Press (Austin, TX). p. 16.
- The Nineteenth Day of the Month of February. Orthodoxy in China.
- February 19. Latin Saints of the Orthodox Patriarchate of Rome.
- The Roman Martyrology. Transl. by the Archbishop of Baltimore. Last Edition, According to the Copy Printed at Rome in 1914. Revised Edition, with the Imprimatur of His Eminence Cardinal Gibbons. Baltimore: John Murphy Company, 1916. pp. 52-53.
- Rev. Richard Stanton. A Menology of England and Wales, or, Brief Memorials of the Ancient British and English Saints Arranged According to the Calendar, Together with the Martyrs of the 16th and 17th Centuries. London: Burns & Oates, 1892. p. 78.

=== Greek Sources ===
- Great Synaxaristes: (in Greek) 19 Φεβρουαρίου. Μεγασ Συναξαριστησ.
- (in Greek) Συναξαριστής. 19 Φεβρουαρίου. Ecclesia.gr. (H Εκκλησια Τησ Ελλαδοσ).

=== Russian Sources ===
- (in Russian) 4 марта (19 февраля). Православная Энциклопедия под редакцией Патриарха Московского и всея Руси Кирилла (электронная версия). (Orthodox Encyclopedia - Pravenc.ru).
- (in Russian) 19 февраля (ст.ст.) 4 марта 2014 (нов. ст.). Русская Православная Церковь Отдел внешних церковных связей. (DECR).
