= March 5 (Eastern Orthodox liturgics) =

Day in the Eastern Orthodox liturgical calendar

Eastern Orthodox liturgical calendar
March 4	March 5	March 6
March 5 O.S. ≍ March 18 N.S. March 5 N.S ≍ February 20 (or February 21 (Note: in a leap year)) O.S.

An Eastern Orthodox cross

March 5 in Eastern Orthodox liturgical calendars is a feast day and a day of commemoration of saints and martyrs. Although some Orthodox churches use the Revised Julian Calendar and others use the traditional Julian calendar, the fixed commemorations for their respective March 5 are broadly the same, no matter which calendar is used. (Note: Despite the dates being the same, the days to which they refer typically differ by 13 days. The notation Old Style or O.S. is sometimes used to indicate a date in the traditional Julian Calendar (the "Old Calendar"). The notation New Style or N.S. indicates a date in the Revised Julian calendar (the "New Calendar").)

== Saints ==
- Martyr Conon of Isauria (1st century)
- Martyr Nestor, father of Martyr Conon of Isauria.
- Martyr Onisius (Onesimus) of Isauria, by beheading (1st century)
- Saint Theophilus, Bishop of Caesarea in Palestine (200)
- Martyr Conon the Gardener, of Pamphylia (251)
- Martyrs Archelaus, Kyrillos, Photios, Virgin-martyr Irais (Rhais) of Antinoë, and 152 Martyrs in Egypt (ca. 308)
- Venerable Conon of Cyprus (4th century) (Note: His holy relics are kept in the monasteries of Kykkou and Machairas in Cyprus.)
- Martyr Eulogius of Palestine.
- Martyr Eulampius of Palestine, by the sword.
- Venerable Mark the Ascetic of Egypt (Mark the Athenian, Mark the Faster) (5th century)
- Saint Hesychius the Faster, of Bithynia (790) (see also: March 6)

== Pre-Schism Western saints ==
- Saint Oliva of Brescia, martyred in Brescia in the north of Italy, under the Emperor Hadrian (138)
- Saint Eusebius, born in Cremona in Italy, he became an abbot in Bethlehem and took part in the struggle against Origenism.
- Saint Eusebius and Companions, a group of ten martyrs who suffered in North Africa.
- Saint Piran (Pyran, Kerrian), monk of Perranporth (c. 480) (Note: "The Feast Day of Saint Piran is March 5th. Whilst we cannot be certain of Piran’s origins it is generally accepted that he was Irish, that he spent time in Wales and later was expelled from Ireland because of his powerful preaching of the Gospel of Jesus Christ. Having been thrown into the sea tied to a mill stone he miraculously arrived on the shores of Cornwall where he built his tiny oratory and continued his work of evangelism, founding communities. There are a number of places in Cornwall bearing his name and at least one holy well. He travelled also to Brittany before returning to Cornwall where he reposed c480 being buried in his little oratory at Perranzabuloe. When that oratory was overwhelmed by sand a larger church was built nearby and it was from this church (also covered by sand but with foundations now visible) that his relics were lost in the Reformation turmoil. The oratory, one of the oldest such Christian buildings in the UK still lies under sand but has in the past been uncovered and there are plans to do so again.") (Note: "St Piran is also known as St Kerrian, and church and parish dedications existed in Devon (for example in Exeter) to him under this name. He is also associated with Brittany." Professor Nicholas Orme writes the following in his Churches of Medieval Exeter: "A saint called Kyeranus appears in a litany of Exeter Cathedral in the late eleventh century (Lapidge, Anglo-Saxon Litanies, 198), and in the cathedral’s twelfth-century martyrology where his feast day is 5 March (D&C 3518 f. 5v). Other cathedral calendars list the commemoration of Keranus on the same day (Ordinale Exon, ed. Dalton and Doble, i, pp. xxii-iii, 16, 216, 344). The saint of the church is Keranus or Kyeranus [Queranus] in Latin documents, with Kerrian as the local vernacular pronunciation. These name-forms are close to that of the Irish saint Ciarán of Saighir, and it is not impossible that St Kerrian chapel was named after him as a result of trading links between Exeter and Ireland."; "However the Cornish St Piran, a distinct saint, was also identified with Ciarán. A Latin life of him was written, based on Ciarán’s, and he was given the same feast day, 5 March. Piran was probably better known in Exeter, due to its links with Cornwall, and the cathedral owned his chief church, Perranzabuloe (St. Piran’s in the Sands), by about 1160 (Barlow, English Episcopal Acta XI, 46). Later he shared the dedication of an altar in the cathedral. It may well be that Piran was the inspiration for the Kerrian dedication, albeit believed (as Piran usually was) to be identical with Ciarán. In practice it made little difference, because in England the written Lives of the two saints were similar and their feast-day identical (Orme, Saints of Cornwall, 160, 220-3).") (Note: "PIRAN, or KIERAN, was a member of one of the Princely houses of Ireland, who quitted his country to spend his days in solitude in a strange land. He landed in Cornwall, and there established himself as a hermit. His sanctity and his austerity won for him the veneration of all around, and the gift of miracles, with which he was favoured, brought many to seek his charitable aid. He is regarded in Cornwall as the patron of those who work in the mines, and several churches are dedicated to his honour.": "Queranus, mentioned by Whitford and Wilson on the 9th of Sep., and honoured in Scotland, is said by Forbes (Kal. of Scottish Saints, p. 435) to be St. Piran of Cornwall.; According to Lanigan (Hist., i., 22, and ii., 9), St. Piran is known in Ireland as Kieran of Saigir, and was a pupil of St. Finian in the sixth century. He is generally spoken of as Bishop of Ossory, but the Irish accounts do not mention his going to England.") (Note: [Irish Hagiologies, and an addition of Usuardus published in 1490. A saint of this name was venerated on this day in the Dumblane Breviary, but it is uncertain if it was the same. The Life of S. Kieran, published by Colgan, and that given by the Bollandists, are of later date, and like so many of the Acts of Celtic Saints, abound in fables.]: "... ...It is singular that, notwithstanding all that is said in the lives, in praise of Kieran, he is not much spoken of in the accounts of contemporary saints, and that none of the Irish annals or hagiologies give the date of his death. Hence Colgan was inclined to think that he died in Cornwall, and is to be identified with S. Piran, of Peranzabulo. But the first life hints that he died at Saigir. Although the year of his death is unknown, there can be little doubt of his having been alive after the year 550. If S. Piran of Peranzabulo be the same as S. Kieran of Saigir, his bones have been discovered of late years, when the ancient oratory of Peranzabulo, near Padstowe, in Cornwall, was dug out of the sand. In favour of this identification, Colgan points out that S. Piran was commemorated at Padstow on the 5th March, the same day as S. Kieran in Ireland; and John of Tynemouth asserts that S. Kieran did retire from Ireland into Cornwall where he spent the latter part of his life, and died. The Cornish, moreover, change the K. of Irish names into P.")
- Saint Colman of Armagh, a disciple of St Patrick in Ireland (5th century)
- Saint Kieran of Saighir (Ciaran, Sen-Chiaráin = the Elder Ciarán), Munster (c. 530) (Note: Called 'the first-born of the saints of Ireland'. Born in Ossory, he was probably consecrated bishop by St Patrick and has been venerated from time immemorial as the first Bishop of Ossory and founder of the monastery of Saighir.) (Note: "[Called by the Britons, Piran.] AMONG the Irish saints who were somewhat older than Saint Patrick, the first and most celebrated is Saint Kiaran, whom the Irish style the first-born of their saints. According to some he was a native of the country of Ossory, according to others, of Cork. Usher places his birth about the year 352. Having received some imperfect information about the Christian faith, at thirty years of age he took a journey to Rome, that he might be instructed in its heavenly doctrine, and learn faithfully to practise its precepts. He was accompanied home by four holy clerks, who were all afterwards bishops, their names are, Lugacius, Columban, Lugad, and Cassan. The Irish writers suppose him to have been ordained bishop at Rome; but what John of Tinmouth affirms, seems far more probable, that he was one of the twelve, whom St. Patrick consecrated bishops in Ireland to assist him in planting the gospel in that Island. For his residence, he built himself a cell in a place encompassed with woods, near the water of Fuaran, which soon grew into a numerous monastery. A town was afterwards built there called Saigar, now from the saint Sier-keran. Here he converted to the faith, his family, and whole clan, which was that of the Osraigs, with many others. Having given the religious veil to his mother whose name was Lidan, he appointed her a cell or monastery near his own, called by the Irish Ceall Lidain. In his old age, being desirous to prepare himself for his passage to eternity in close retirement, he passed into Cornwall, where his led an eremitical life, near the Severn sea, fifteen miles from Padstow. Certain disciples joined him, and by his words and example formed themselves to a true spirit of Christian piety and humility. In this place he closed his mortal pilgrimage by a happy death: a town upon the spot is to this day called from him St. Piran’s in the Sands, and a church is there dedicated to God in his memory, where was formerly a sanctuary near St. Mogun’s church, upon St. Mogun’s creek.")
- Saint Carthage the Elder, the successor of St Kieran as Bishop of Ossory in Ireland (ca. 540)
- Saint Caron, the church at Tregaron in Dyfed in Wales is dedicated to him.
- Saint Virgilius of Arles, Archbishop of Arles (610) (Note: A monk from Lérins who became Bishop of Arles in France. He probably consecrated Augustine Archbishop of Canterbury.)
- Saint Clement, Abbot of Santa Lucia in Syracuse in Sicily (ca. 800)

== Post-Schism Orthodox saints ==
- Saints Basil (1249) and Constantine (1257), princes of Yaroslavl.
- Monk-martyr Adrian, Abbot of Poshekhonye (1550), and his fellow-ascetic St. Leonidas (1549)
- New Martyr John the Bulgarian, at Constantinople (1784)
- New Hieromartyr Parthenius, Bishop of Didymoteichon in Thrace (1805) (see also: March 15 - Greek)
- New Martyr George of Rapsani, at Larissa (1818)
- Saint Nikolai (Velimirovich), Bishop of Ohrid and Žiča, Serbia (1956)

=== New martyrs and confessors ===
- New Hieromartyr Nicholas Pokrovsky (1919)
- New Hieromartyr John Mirotvortsiev (1938)
- New Hieromartyr Theophan (Grafov), Hierodeacon, of Borisoglebsk Monastery, Vladimir (1938)
- New Hieromartyr Mardarius (Isaev), Hieromonk, of Yurievskoe, Yaroslavl, (1938)

== Other commemorations ==
- Icon of the Mother of God "the Teacher" (or "Education" or "Nurtured Up-Bringing").
- Translation of the relics (1463) of St. Theodore, Prince of Smolensk and Yaroslavl (1299), and his children Saints David (1321) and Constantine (c. 1322)
- Repose of Metropolitan Cornelius of Novgorod (1698)

== Icon gallery ==
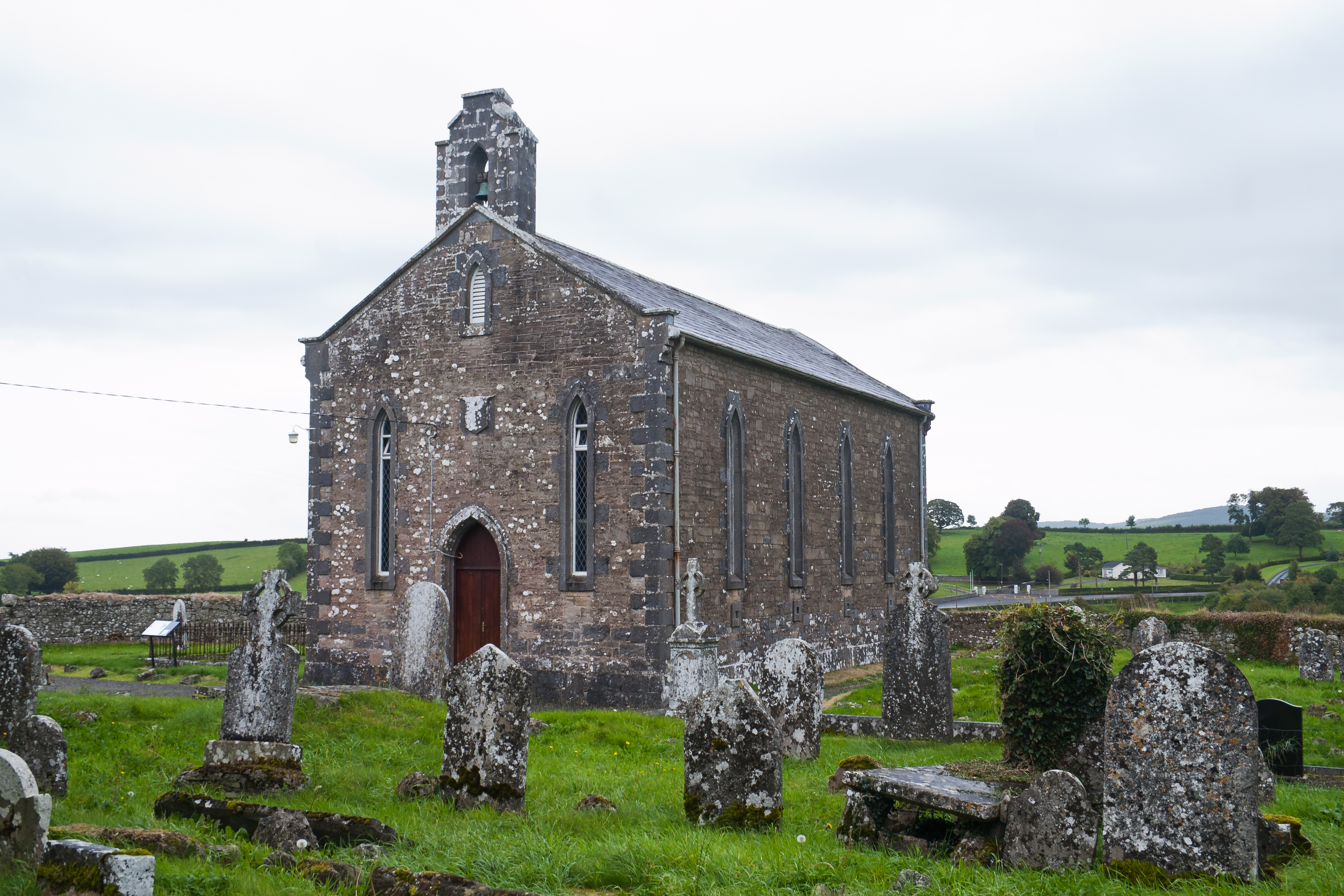
The Church of Seir Kieran, in County Offaly, Ireland.

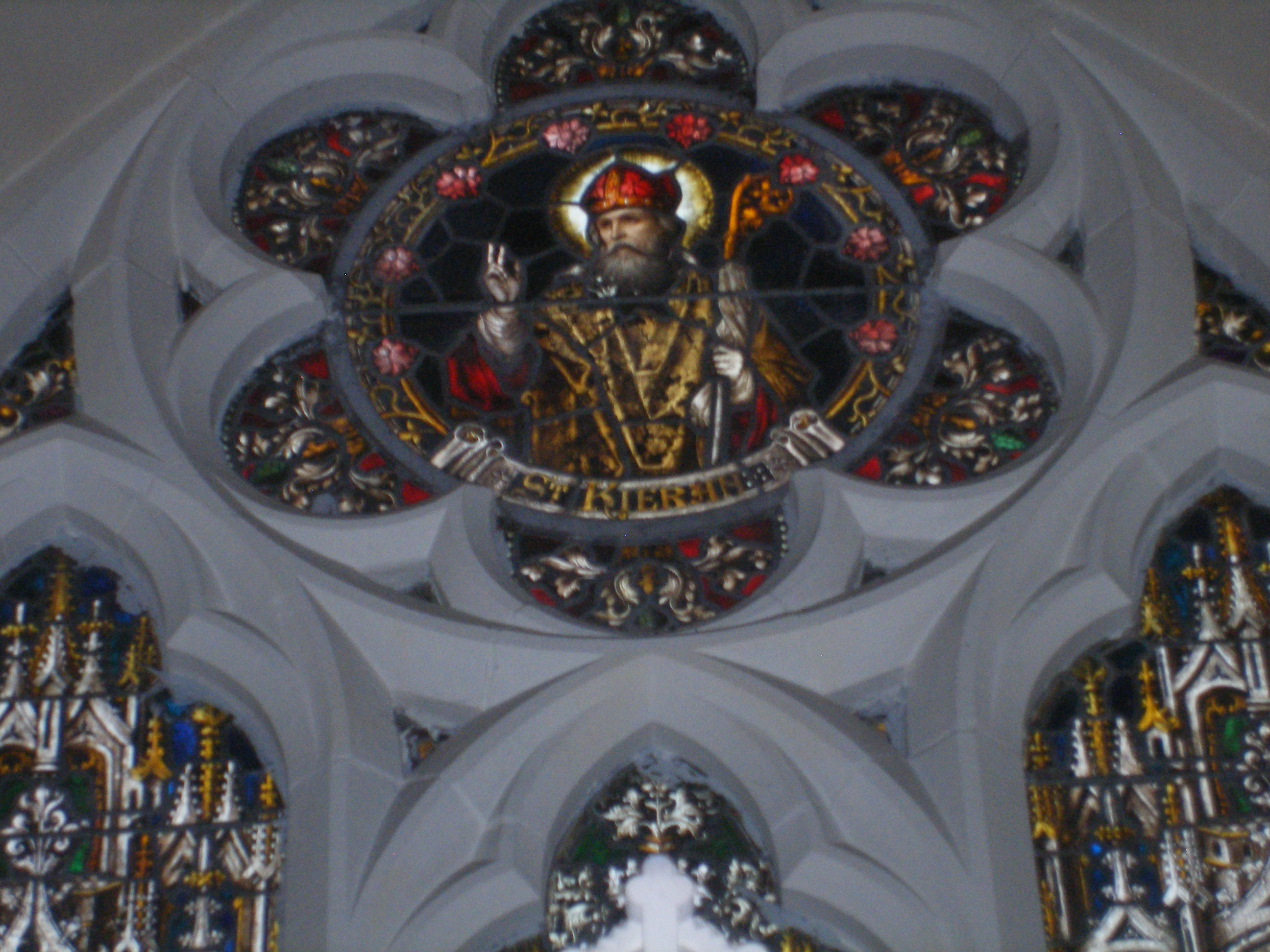
St. Kieran of Saighir, Seir Kieran Church, Bell Hill, Ireland.

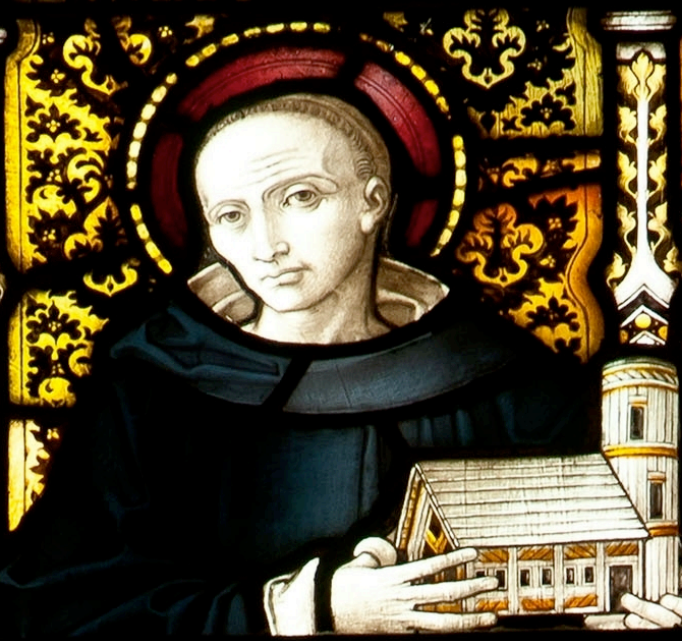
A depiction of St. Piran in a stained glass window in Truro Cathedral (donated by a benefactor in 1907).

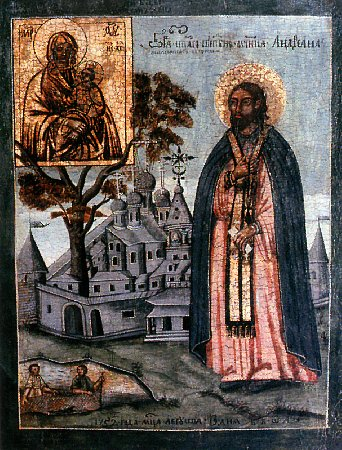
Monk-martyr Adrian of Poshekhonye.

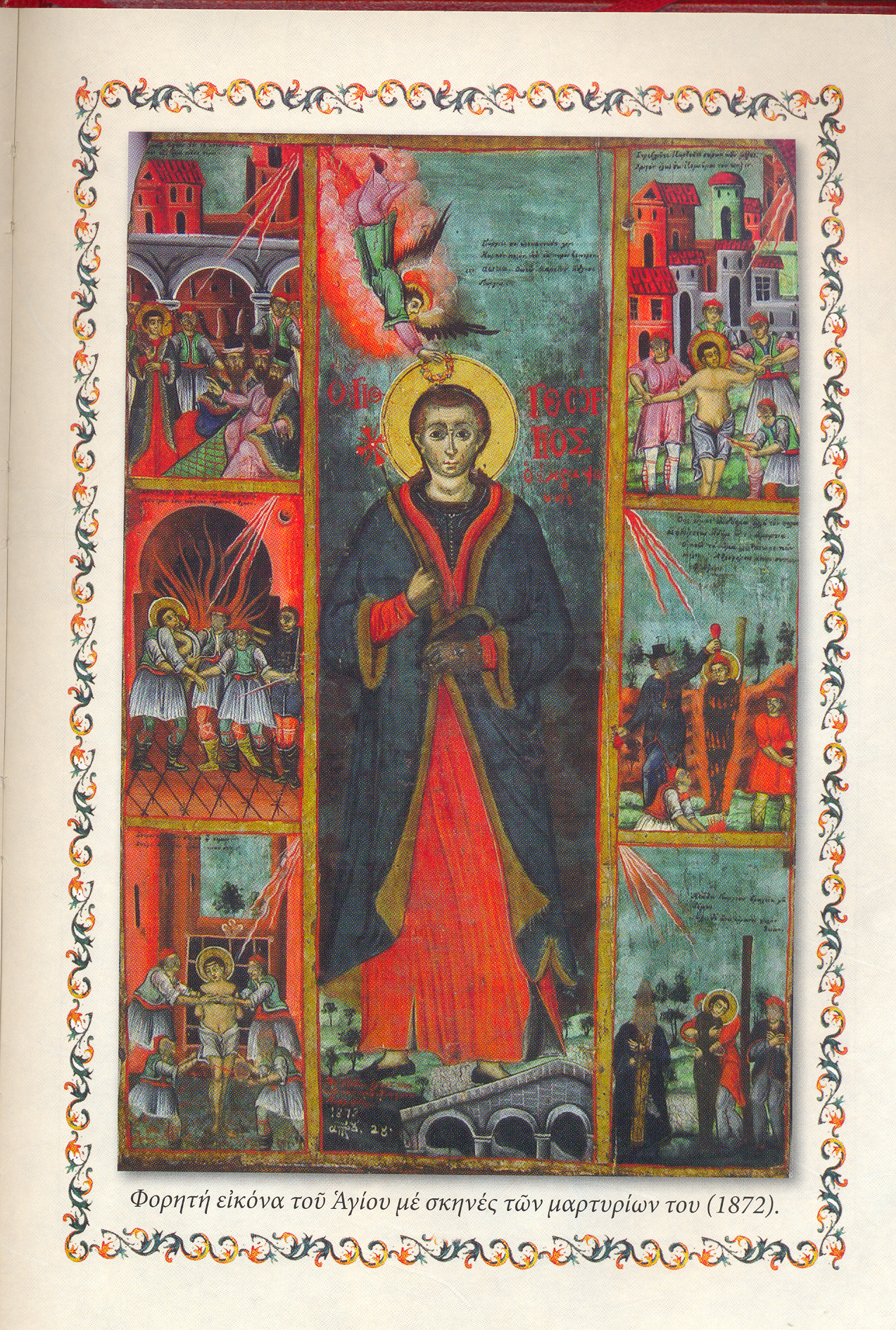
New Martyr George of Rapsani.

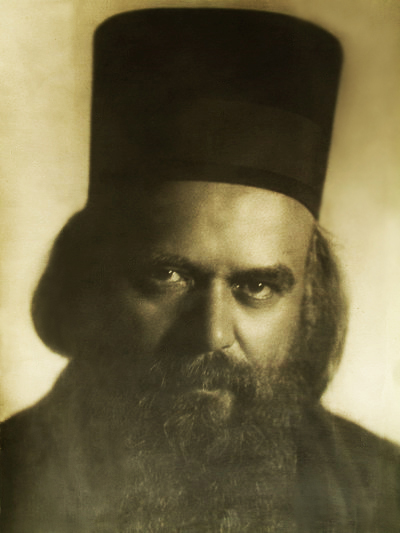
Saint Nikolaj Velimirović.

== Sources ==
- March 5/March 18. Orthodox Calendar (PRAVOSLAVIE.RU).
- March 18 / March 5. HOLY TRINITY RUSSIAN ORTHODOX CHURCH (A parish of the Patriarchate of Moscow).
- March 5. OCA - The Lives of the Saints.
- The Autonomous Orthodox Metropolia of Western Europe and the Americas (ROCOR). St. Hilarion Calendar of Saints for the year of our Lord 2004. St. Hilarion Press (Austin, TX). p. 19.
- March 5. Latin Saints of the Orthodox Patriarchate of Rome.
- The Roman Martyrology. Transl. by the Archbishop of Baltimore. Last Edition, According to the Copy Printed at Rome in 1914. Revised Edition, with the Imprimatur of His Eminence Cardinal Gibbons. Baltimore: John Murphy Company, 1916. p. 66.
- Rev. Richard Stanton. A Menology of England and Wales, or, Brief Memorials of the Ancient British and English Saints Arranged According to the Calendar, Together with the Martyrs of the 16th and 17th Centuries. London: Burns & Oates, 1892. p. 102.

Greek Sources

- Great Synaxaristes: (in Greek) 5 ΜΑΡΤΙΟΥ. ΜΕΓΑΣ ΣΥΝΑΞΑΡΙΣΤΗΣ.
- (in Greek) Συναξαριστής. 5 Μαρτίου. ECCLESIA.GR. (H ΕΚΚΛΗΣΙΑ ΤΗΣ ΕΛΛΑΔΟΣ).

Russian Sources

- (in Russian) 18 марта (5 марта). Православная Энциклопедия под редакцией Патриарха Московского и всея Руси Кирилла (электронная версия). (Orthodox Encyclopedia - Pravenc.ru).
- (in Russian) 5 марта (ст.ст.) 18 марта 2013 (нов. ст.). Русская Православная Церковь Отдел внешних церковных связей. (DECR).
