= February 22 (Eastern Orthodox liturgics) =

Day in the Eastern Orthodox liturgical calendar

Eastern Orthodox liturgical calendar
| February 21 | February 22 | February 23 |
February 22 O.S. ≍ March 7 (or March 6 (Note: in a leap year)) N.S. February 22 N.S ≍ February 9 O.S.

An Eastern Orthodox cross

February 22 in Eastern Orthodox liturgical calendars is a feast day and a day of commemoration of saints and martyrs. Although some Orthodox churches use the Revised Julian Calendar and others use the traditional Julian calendar, the fixed commemorations for their respective February 22 are broadly the same, no matter which calendar is used. (Note: Despite the dates being the same, the days to which they refer typically differ by 13 days. The notation Old Style or O.S. is sometimes used to indicate a date in the traditional Julian Calendar (the "Old Calendar"). The notation New Style or N.S. indicates a date in the Revised Julian calendar (the "New Calendar").)

== Saints ==
- Saint Abilius (Avilius), Bishop of Alexandria (98) (Note: "At Alexandria, St. Abilius, bishop, who was the second pastor of that city after St. Mark, and administered his charge with eminent piety.")
- Saint Telesphorus, Pope of Rome (136) (Note: A Greek who was Pope of Rome for ten years and was martyred under Hadrian.)
- Saint Papias, Bishop of Hierapolis (2nd century) (Note: "At Hierapolis, in Phrygia, blessed Papias, bishop of that city, who had been, with St. Polycarp, a disciple of St. John in his old age.")
- Martyr Synesius (Synetus), by the sword. (Note: This may be the same person as "Martyr Synesius (Synetus) of Rome, a Reader, tortured and beheaded for refusing to sacrifice to idols (270-275)", who celebrates on December 12.)
- Martyrs Maurice, his son Photinus, Theodore, Philip, and 70 soldiers, at Apamea in Syria (286-305) (see also: December 27)
- Martyrs Anthusa and her 12 servants, by the sword.
- Saint Titus of Bostra, Bishop of Bostra in Arabia (378)
- Saint Ariston the Wonderworker, Bishop of Arsinoe, Cyprus (Famagusta) (c. late 4th - early 5th centuries) (Note: Western sources mention a Saint Aristion as being a disciple of Christ and one of the Seventy disciples (1st century). The Roman Martyrology has the following: "At Salamis, in Cyprus, St. Aristion, who the same Papias says was one of the seventy-two disciples of Christ.")
- Venerable Baradates, hermit near Antioch (469)
- Venerable Saints Thalassius and Limneus hermits near Cyrrhus (5th century)
- Holy Nine Children of Kola, Georgia (6th century):

- Guram, Adarnasе, Baqar, Vache, Bardzim, Dachi, Dzhuansher, Ramaz, and Parsman.

- Saint Leontius of Lycia (6th century)
- Saints Babylus and his wife Comnita, of Nicosa (7th century)
- Venerable Athanasius the Confessor of Constantinople (821)
- Saint Peter the Stylite of Mount Athos.
- Saint Blaise, Bishop.

== Pre-Schism Western saints ==
- Saint Paschasius, eleventh Bishop of Vienne in France (c. 312) (Note: "At Vienna, St. Paschasius, bishop, celebrated for his learning and holy life.")
- Saint Maximianus of Ravenna, Bishop of Ravenna (c. 556) (Note: Consecrated Bishop of Ravenna in Italy in 546, he built the Basilica of San Vitale, which was dedicated in the presence of the Emperor Justinian and his wife Theodora. Holding a jewelled cross, he is depicted in mosaics standing next to the Emperor.) (see also: February 21)
- Saint Elwin (Elwen), missionary, a holy man who accompanied St Breaca from Ireland to Cornwall (6th century)
- Saint John the Saxon, born in Saxony in Germany, he restored monasticism in England after the Danish attacks, Abbot of Athelney (895) (Note: "JOHN was one of those learned men whom King Alfred invited from the Continent to labour for the restoration of religion and learning in England, after the devastation of the Danes. He was a native of Old Saxony or Friesland, but appears to have been a monk of some house in France, when he was called to this country. The King placed him as Abbot of Athelingay, a monastery which he was anxious to restore, as a pious memorial of his own days of exile in that region. John was zealous for religious discipline, a thing little in accordance with the inclination of certain French monks, who formed part of the community. Two of these were so blinded by their malice as to conspire to put him to death, and accomplished their wicked design one night in the church itself, whither the holy man had retired, as was his custom, to pray in solitude and silence.")
- Saint Raynerius (Raynier), a Benedictine monk at Beaulieu near Limoges, France (c. 967)

== Post-Schism Orthodox saints ==
- Saint Herman, founder of Stolobny Monastery, Novgorod (1614)

=== New martyrs and confessors ===
- New Hieromartyr Michael Lisitsyn, priest, of Ust-Labinskaya (1918)
- New Hieromartyrs Joseph Smirnov, Protopresbyter, and Vladimir Ilinsky, Priest (1918)
- New Hieromartyrs John Kastorsky, Deacon, and John Perebaskin, of Kostroma-Galich (1918)
- New Martyr Blessed Theoktista Mikhailovna, Fool-for-Christ, of Voronezh (1936)
- New Hieromartyrs Michael Gorbunov, John Orlov, Victor Morigerovsky, John Parushnikov, Sergius Belokurov, Andrew Yasenev, and Paul Smirnov, Priests (1938)
- New Hieromartyrs Sergius Bukashkin and Antipas Kirillov, Hieromonks (1938)
- Virgin-martyrs Elizabeth Timokhin, Irene Smirnov, and Barbara Losev (1938)
- Virgin-martyr Parasceva Makarov (1938)
- Martyrs Stephen Frantov and Nicholas Nekrasov (1938)
- Martyrs Leonid Salkov and Peter Antonov, of Alma-Ata (1938)
- Martyr Andrew Gnevishev of Tver (1941)
- New Hieromartyr Philaret (Pryakhin), Abbot, of Trubino, Tver (1942)

== Other commemorations ==
- Uncovering of the relics (607-610) of the Holy Apostles Andronicus and Junia (1st century) and the Holy Martyrs, at the Gate of Eugenius at Constantinople. (Note: In the twelfth century, a great domed church was built on the spot where the relics of the holy martyrs were discovered. This work was undertaken by the Emperor Andronikos I Komnenos (1183-1185), whose patron saint was the holy Apostle Andronicus.) (Note: Dismissal Hymn. Fourth Tone. "THY Martyrs, O Lord, in their courageous contest for Thee received as the prize the crowns of incorruption and life from Thee, our immortal God. For since they possessed Thy strength, they cast down the tyrants and wholly destroyed the demons' strengthless presumption. O Christ God, by their prayers, save our souls, since Thou art merciful.")
- Repose of Righteous Gregory (“Golden Grits”) Miroshnikov of Sednev (1855)
- Repose of Schemanun Avramia of Kashin (1855)
- Repose of Blessed Theoktista Mikhailovna, Fool-for-Christ, of Voronezh (1936)

== Icon gallery ==
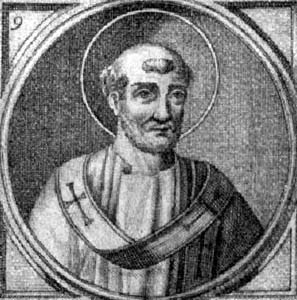
Saint Telesphorus, Pope of Rome.

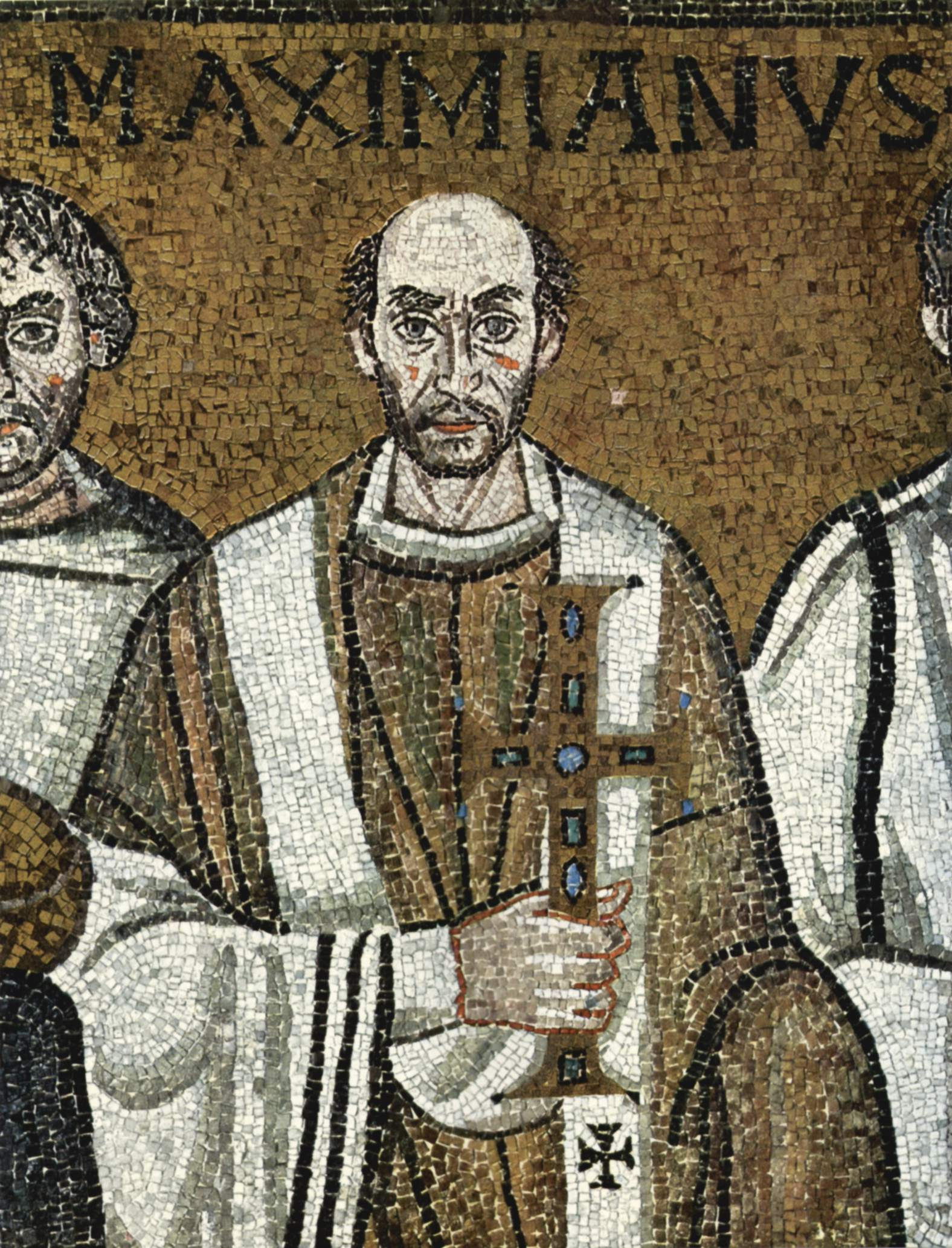
Saint Maximianus of Ravenna, Bishop of Ravenna.

== Sources ==
- February 22 / March 7. Orthodox Calendar (Pravoslavie.ru).
- March 7 / February 22. Holy Trinity Russian Orthodox Church (A parish of the Patriarchate of Moscow).
- February 22. OCA - The Lives of the Saints.
- The Autonomous Orthodox Metropolia of Western Europe and the Americas. St. Hilarion Calendar of Saints for the year of our Lord 2004. St. Hilarion Press (Austin, TX). p. 17.
- The Twenty-Second Day of the Month of February. Orthodoxy in China.
- February 22. Latin Saints of the Orthodox Patriarchate of Rome.
- The Roman Martyrology. Transl. by the Archbishop of Baltimore. Last Edition, According to the Copy Printed at Rome in 1914. Revised Edition, with the Imprimatur of His Eminence Cardinal Gibbons. Baltimore: John Murphy Company, 1916. p. 55.
- Rev. Richard Stanton. A Menology of England and Wales, or, Brief Memorials of the Ancient British and English Saints Arranged According to the Calendar, Together with the Martyrs of the 16th and 17th Centuries. London: Burns & Oates, 1892. p. 81.

Greek Sources

- Great Synaxaristes: (in Greek) 22 Φεβρουαρίου. Μεγασ Συναξαριστησ.
- (in Greek) Συναξαριστής. 22 Φεβρουαρίου. Ecclesia.gr. (H Εκκλησια τησ Ελλαδοσ).

Russian Sources

- (in Russian) 7 марта (22 февраля). Православная Энциклопедия под редакцией Патриарха Московского и всея Руси Кирилла (электронная версия). (Orthodox Encyclopedia - Pravenc.ru).
- (in Russian) 22 февраля (ст.ст.) 7 марта 2014 (нов. ст.). Русская Православная Церковь Отдел внешних церковных связей. (DECR).
