= Patrick of Avernia =

Some martyrologies mention against 16 March a Patrick, bishop of Avernia. Avernia was the Latin name for the Auvergne, but no such Patrick is known there. The reference should have been to Saint Patrick, patron saint of Ireland.

The mistake is believed to have been made by a copyist who wrote "Avernia" for "Hivernia" or "Hibernia", and once the second saint got into the martyrologies his feast was moved to another day to avoid confusion.
