= Basiliscus of Comana =

Early 4th-century Greek martyr

Saint Basiliscus of Comana
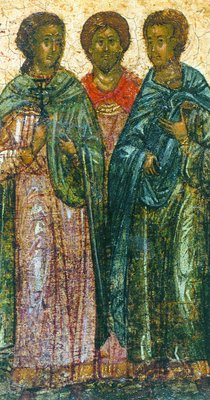
- Martyrs Eutropius, Cleonicus, and Basiliscus, Menaion calendar icons, 16th century
- Died: c. 310; Comana, Pontus (modern-day Gümenek, Tokat, Turkey)
- Venerated in: Roman Catholic Church; Eastern Orthodox Church
- Feast: 22 May or 30 July (Greek calendar)

Basiliscus of Comana (Greek: Βασιλίσκος; died c. 310), also known as Basiliscus of Pontus, was a Greek martyr. His feast day is 22 May, or 30 July in the Greek calendar.

== Life ==
Locations in modern Turkey

The story of Basilicus is an example of an itinerant martyrdom. He was arrested in Amasia in Pontus, but was allowed to go to the village of Choumiala to see his family before returning to Amasya for trial. He was then taken to the village of Dakozara before being martyred outside Comana. He is associated with the martyrs Eutropius and Cleonicus during his journey, in which he was followed by a crowd and performed various miracles.

Another version says Basiliscus, Bishop of Comana, was decapitated around 312 at Nicomedia by the tyrant Maximinus Daza (r. 310–313). The biography of John Chrysostom says that Basiliscus, Bishop of Comana, was martyred under Maximian (r. 286–305).

== Monks of Ramsgate account ==
The Monks of Ramsgate wrote in their Book of Saints (1921),

BASILICUS (St.) M. (May 22)
(4th century) A Bishop of Comana in Pontus (Asia Minor), who was beheaded and his body thrown into a river near Nicomedia (A.D. 312), under the Emperor Maximin Daza. The Greeks honour him on July 30. This was the holy Martyr who, appearing to Saint John Chrysostom, intimated to him that on the morrow that Saint’s work for God on earth would end.

== Roman Martyrology ==
The Roman Martyrology says, under The Twenty-Second Day of May,

At Comana, in Pontus, under the emperor Maximian and the governor Agrippa, the holy martyr Basiliscus, who was forced to wear iron shoes pierced with heated nails, and endured many other trials. Being at last decapitated and thrown into a river, he obtained the glory of martyrdom.

== Butler's account ==
The hagiographer Alban Butler wrote in his Lives of the Primitive Fathers, Martyrs, and Other Principal Saints under May 22,

Saint Basiliscus, Bishop of Comana in Pontius, Martyr

He received the crown of martyrdom together with Saint Lucia at Nicomedia in 312, under the tyrant Maximinus Daia. Peace being soon after restored to the church, his body was honourably brought back to Comana. Saint Chrysostom died in the Presbyterium or community of the clergy belonging to the church of Saint Basiliscus. The martyr had before admonished the priest in a dream to prepare a lodging for his brother John; and he comforted Saint Chrysostom by a vision, in which he bade him be of good courage, for the next day they should be together. See Palladius in vita Chrys. Theodoret, and Sozomen.

== Sources ==
- Benedict XIV (1916), The Roman Martyrology, translated by Archbishop of Baltimore, Aeterna Press This article incorporates text from this source, which is in the public domain.
- Butler, Alban (1821), The lives of the fathers, martyrs, and other principal saints This article incorporates text from this source, which is in the public domain.
- Drake, Maurice; Drake, Wilfred (1916-01-01), Saints and their emblems, Dalcassian Publishing Company
- Jacobs, Ine; Elton, Hugh (2018-10-18), Asia Minor in the Long Sixth Century: Current Research and Future Directions, Oxbow Books, ISBN 978-1-78925-010-7
- Mullen, Roderic (2003-12-01), The Expansion of Christianity: A Gazetteer of its First Three Centuries, BRILL, ISBN 978-90-474-0232-9
- St. Augustine's Abbey, Ramsgate (1921). The Book of saints : a dictionary of servants of God canonized by the Catholic Church. London: A. & C. Black, ltd. OCLC 671676136. This article incorporates text from this source, which is in the public domain.
