= Jacob the Monk (Lebanon) =

Jacob the Monk (Greek Ἰάκωβος μονάχος, Latin Jacobus monachus), known in Syriac as Jacob the Wanderer (ܡܫܢܝܢܐܝܥܩܘܒ) and in Russian as Jacob the Palestinian (Иаков Палестинский), Jacob the Fasting (Иаков Постник), and Jacob of Carmel (Иаков Кармильский) was (if he existed) a hermit who lived in sixth-century Palestine. Whether or not he existed, he became a prominent saint in Greek, Russian, and Syrian Orthodox Christianity. The most famous story about Jacob is that, after living for many years as a hermit, he succumbs to temptation and has sex with a girl, whom he then murders. The depth of his repentance thereafter is the key source of his fame for holiness.

In the assessment of Maxim G. Kalinin, the account of Jacob's life, which circulated in Greek, Syriac, Slavonic and Latin, "is one of the most famous monuments of Byzantine hagiographic literature".

== Sources ==
A Greek life of Jacob (Βίος 'Ιακώβου μονάχου) exists in at least fourteen manuscripts, of which the oldest is Vatican City, Biblioteca Apostolica Vaticana, Vat. gr. 1660, dating from 916. This text is number 770 in the Bibliotheca Hagiographica Graeca; it was edited in the Patrologia Graeca from an incomplete text held in Paris, an edition that was reprinted and translated into English by Reinhard Pummer in 2002. An improved edition was published in 1935 based on Vat. gr. 1660. In the assessment of Stratis Papaioannou, "a critical edition and survey of all the versions of Jacob's tale remains a desideratum".

The life was long thought to originate around the time of the earliest Greek manuscript (the Patrologia Graeca attributes it to the tenth-century Symeon Metaphrastes), but in 2019 Maxim G. Kalinin argued that this Greek text was the basis for the Syriac Life of Jacob. The Syriac translation exists in three manuscripts: London, British Library, Add. 14647 (from 688), Add. 12175 (from c. 700), and Add. 14650 (from 875). As these all descend from a lost common ancestor, Kalinin argued that the origin of the Greek life must significantly predate 688 and thus that the life was composed relatively close to the putative lifetime of Jacob. As of 2019, the Syriac version had not been edited.

The Greek text was translated into Slavonic; this translation has been edited by Franz Miklosich. It was also translated into Latin.

Jacob is also known from menologia and synaxaria of the Church of Constantinople, where he is mentioned for October 9 or 10. A Greek summary of Jacob's life, attested in three seventeenth-century manuscripts, also exists (Bibliotheca Hagiographica Graeca 770c). It has been translated into English by Stratis Papaioannou.

== Biography ==
Since Jacob's story seems to be set around the time of the 556 Samaritan revolt, during the reign of Justinian I, he is assumed to have lived in the sixth century.

The vita tells how Jacob lived a holy life in the vicinity of Mount Carmel and Samareia. He overcomes many temptations. The story describes how Samaritans hostile to Jacob send a dissolute woman to seduce him: Jacob, in order not to succumb to temptation, burns his left hand on a candle, thereby turning the shocked woman to repentance. However, having achieved holiness over years of asceticism and having performed numerous miracles, Jacob falls into grave sins at the end of his life. As told by the Greek synopsis (BHG 770c):

He became so distinguished in virtue and so advanced in the ascetic life that he was even given the power to drive out demons; for this reason, many people ran to him. Seeing all this, the Devil became envious of him and, with God’s permission, Jacob too fell into a transgression. The Devil entered the daughter of a rich man, and made her invoke the help of the saint, so as to force her parents to both search for and find Jacob. The father fell down on his knees and begged that the demon be driven out of her. And Jacob prayed and expelled the demon. The parents, worried that the demon might perhaps return and enter her again, left the girl there until she might be healed completely. When they left, the ascetic started to be besieged by the Devil; defeated, he had sex with the girl; and in addition he went on and killed her, left his cell, and began walking.

Seized by despair, the ascetic does not hope for forgiveness from God and heads out of the desert into the world. Along the way, he meets a monk who, having learned the story of Jacob's life, convinces him to repent. Jacob discovers a tomb, settles in it and begins to mourn his sins. Without leaving his refuge, he feeds only on the grass that grows at the entrance to the cave. Ten years later, it is revealed to the people of the neighboring town that Jacob has received forgiveness: through his prayers, he ends a drought and regains the ability to cast out demons and perform other miracles.

== Influence ==
The episode has been seen as an analogue to the killing of the Amazon Maximou by the etponymous protagonist of the Greek Digenes Akritas.

In its Slavonic translation, the story was a key source for Leo Tolstoy's short story "Father Sergius".
