= Jochem =

Jochem is a Dutch masculine given name. It is a form of Joachim. Notable people with the name include:

- Jochem Bobeldijk (1920–2010), Dutch sprint canoeist
- Jochem Fluitsma (born 1958), Dutch music producer and musician
- Jochem de Gruijter (born 1978), volleyball player from the Netherlands
- Jochem van Gelder (born 1963), Dutch television presenter
- Jochem Hendricks (born 1959), contemporary artist from Frankfurt, Germany
- Jochem Hoekstra (born 1992), Dutch racing cyclist
- Jochem Jacobs (born 1977), Dutch guitarist, producer and recording engineer
- Jochem Jansen (born 1990), Dutch professional footballer
- Jochem Pietersen Kuyter (died 1654), early colonist to New Netherland in what would become Harlem on the island of Manhattan
- Jochem Marotzke (born 1959), German physical oceanographer, climate scientist and academic
- Jochem George Paap (born 1969), Dutch electronic music producer (stage name Speedy J) based in Rotterdam
- Jochem Schindler (1944–1994), Austrian Indo-Europeanist
- Jochem Swartenhont (1566–1627), Dutch naval officer in the navy of the Dutch Republic
- Jochem Tanghe (born 1987), Belgian football goalkeeper
- Jochem Uytdehaage (born 1976), former Dutch long track speed skater and two-time Olympic champion
- Jochem Verberne (born 1978), former rower from the Netherlands
- Jochem Ziegert (born 1954), former German footballer

== See also ==
- Joachim (disambiguation)
- Joakim
- Joaquim
- Joaquín
