= Joachim (given name) =

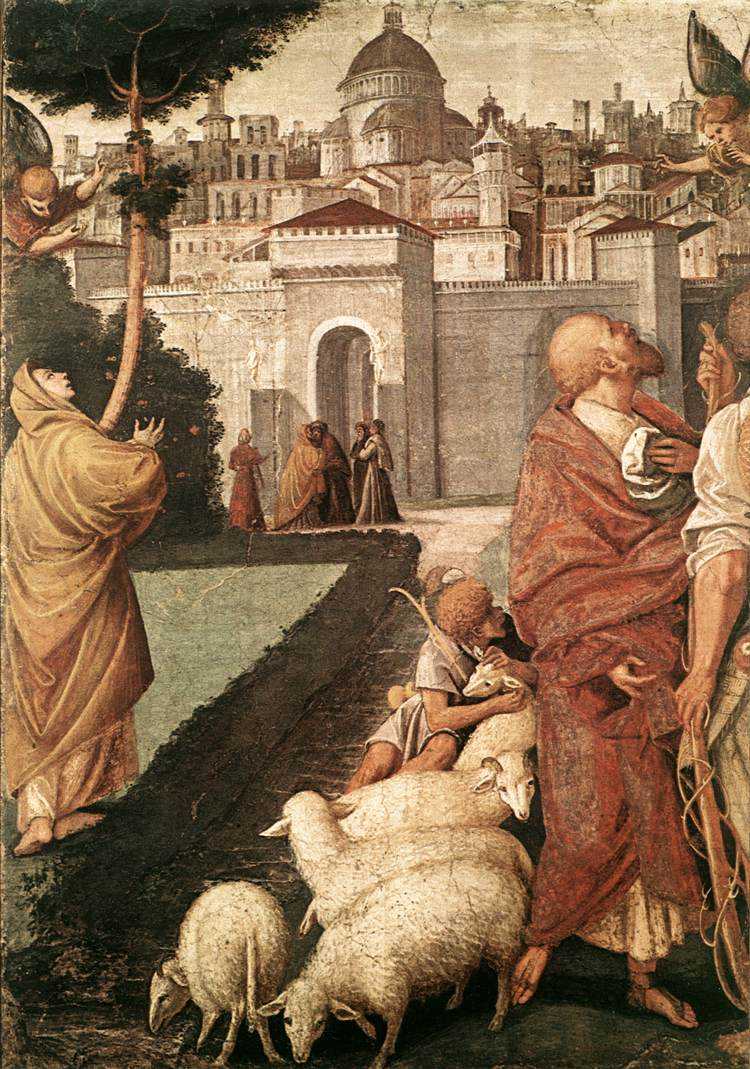
- 16th-century Italian Catholic image of Joachim (right) and Saint Anne (left) looking up at angels. (Detail of a fresco painted 1544-1545 by Gaudenzio Ferrari.)
- Pronunciation: English: /ˈdʒoʊəkɪm/ JOH-ə-kim; French: [ʒɔakim, ʒɔaʃɛ̃]; German: [joˈʔaxɪm, ˈjoːaxɪm]; Danish: [ˈjoæˌkʰimˀ]
- Gender: Male

Origin
- Origin: Hebrew
- Meaning: "raised by YHWH"

Other names
- Alternative spelling: Yowakim, Joakim
- Related names: Joaquín, Joaquim, Imran, Hakim, Gioacchino

Joachim is a masculine given name, derived from the Hebrew Yehoyaqim (יְהוֹיָקִים), meaning "raised by Yahweh".

== People ==
- Jehoiakim (c. 635–597 BC), king of Judah, from whom all later versions of the name are directly or indirectly derived
- Jehoiachin, king of Judah and son of Jehoiakim
- Joachim, a Saint in the Roman Catholic and Eastern Orthodox traditions. He was the father of Mary, the mother of Jesus
- Joachim (Levitsky) (1853–c.1921), Russian Orthodox bishop and religious writer
- Prince Joachim of Belgium, Archduke of Austria-Este (born 1991)
- Patriarch Joachim I of Constantinople, reigned 1498–1502,1504
- Patriarch Joachim II of Constantinople, reigned 1860–1863, 1873–1878
- Ecumenical Patriarch Joachim III of Constantinople (1834–1912)
- Prince Joachim of Denmark (born 1969)
- Joachim of Fiore (c. 1135–1202), Italian monk, founder of the heretical "Three Ages" theory
- Joachim of Ithaca (1786–1868), born in Ithaca, Greece, a Saint in the Eastern Orthodox tradition
- Patriarch Joachim of Moscow (1620–1690), the eleventh Patriarch of Moscow and All Russia
- Joachim of Korsun (died 1030), first bishop of Novgorod the Great
- Prince Joachim of Prussia (1890–1920), German royal
- Joachim, Count of Schönburg-Glauchau (1929–1998), German count
- Joachim Beck-Friis (1861–1939), Swedish diplomat
- Joachim-Ernst Berendt (1922–2000), German jazz journalist
- Joachim Björklund (born 1971), Swedish football player
- Joachim-Raphaël Boronali, a pseudoym used by the French novelist Roland Dorgelès (1885–1973)
- Joachim Dahissiho, Beninese politician
- Joachim du Bellay (1522–1560), French poet
- Joachim Albrecht Eggeling (1884–1945), German Nazi SS officer
- Joachim Fest (1926–2006), German historian and writer on Nazi Germany
- Joachim Fuchsberger (1927–2014), German actor and television host
- Joachim Garraud, (born 1968), French DJ
- Joachim Gauck (born 1940), President of Germany 2012–2017
- Joachim Grubich (1935–2025), Polish organist
- Joachim Gruppelaar (1911–1971), Dutch Olympic equestrian
- Joachim Gutkeled (c.1240–1277), Hungarian baron
- Joachim Hamann (1913–1945), Baltic-German Holocaust perpetrator
- Joachim II Hector, Elector of Brandenburg (1505–1571)
- Joachim Johansson (born 1982), Swedish tennis player
- Joachim Kroll (1933–1991), German serial killer, rapist, and cannibal
- Joachim Löw (born 1960), German football coach and former manager of the Germany national team
- Otto Joachim Moltke (1770–1853), Danish politician and Minister of State
- Joachim Mrugowsky (1905–1948), German Nazi doctor executed for war crimes
- Joachim Murat, multiple people
- Joachim Nagel (born 1966), German economist and current president of the Bundesbank
- Joachim I Nestor, Elector of Brandenburg (1484–1535), German member of the Hohenzollern
- Joachim Peiper (1915–1976), German war criminal and SS leader
- Joachim Perinet (1763–1816), Austrian dramatist
- Joseph Joachim Raff (1822–1882), German-Swiss composer, teacher and pianist
- Joachim Riis (born 1989), Danish politician
- Joachim Ringelnatz, pen name of German author and painter Hans Bötticher (1883–1934)
- Joachim Rumohr (1910-1945), German Nazi SS commander
- Joachim Holmboe Rønneberg (1851–1929), Norwegian politician
- Joachim Rønneberg (1919–2018), member of the Operation Gunnerside team of the sabotage of the heavy water plant at Vemork
- Joachim Sauer (born 1949), German scientist
- Joachim Soltvedt (born 1995), Norwegian footballer
- Joachim Stamp (born 1970), German politician
- Hans-Joachim Stuck (born 1951), German motor racing driver
- Joachim Stutschewsky (1891–1982), Ukraine-born Austrian and Israeli cellist
- Joachim von Ribbentrop (1893–1946), German Nazi foreign minister and war criminal
- Joachim Wendler (1939–1975), German aquanaut
- Joachim Witt (born 1949), German musician and actor
- Joachim Ziegler (1905–1945), German Nazi SS commander

== Fictional characters ==
- Joachim Armster, the vampiric boss of the Dark Palace of Waterfalls in the Castlevania: Lament of Innocence video game
- Elder Joachim, a high-ranking member of the Panarii religion and mentor to the character Virgil in the 2001 video game Arcanum: Of Steamworks and Magick Obscura
- Joachim (Star Trek), a villain from the Star Trek episode "Space Seed" and the movie Star Trek II: The Wrath of Khan
- Joachim, the Norwegian protagonist of Jostein Gaarder's novel The Christmas Mystery
- Joachim Kleronomas, a cyborg legend who figured heavily in George R. R. Martin's novella The Glass Flower which was published in 1986.
- Joachim de Wett, a Nilfgaardian commander in The Witcher series
- Joachim Ziemssen, cousin of the protagonist Hans Castorp in Thomas Mann's 1924 novel The Magic Mountain

== Other language forms ==
Languages	Variants	Notes
Albanian	Gjokë	(def.)
Albanian	Gjoka	(indef.)
Armenian	Hovakim (Հովակիմ)	
Basque	Jokin	
Basque	Iokin	
Breton	Joakim	
Catalan	Joaquim	
Catalan	Quim	
Catalan	Ximo	(in Valencian)
Czech	Jáchym	
Danish	Joakim	
Finnish	Joakim	
Norwegian	Joakim	
Swedish	Joakim	
Dutch	Jochem	
Dutch	Jogchum	
Dutch	Jochen	
Dutch	Joachim	
French	Joachim	
Galician	Xaquín	
German	Joachim	
German	Jochen	
German	Achim	
Greek	Iōākeím (Ιωακείμ)	
Hungarian	Joakim	
Icelandic	Jóakim	
Irish	Ioaichím	
Indonesian	Yoakim	
Italian	Gioacchino	
Maltese	Ġwakkin	
Murcian	Iacin	
Murcian	Juaqui	
Murcian	Quino	
Polish	Joachim	
Portuguese	Joaquim	(short forms: Jaquim, Quim, Quincas)
Romanian	Ioachim	
Russian	Ioakim (Иоаким)	
Russian	Akim (Аким)	
Serbian	Joakim (Јоаким)	and diminutives
Serbian	Jakim (Јаким)	and diminutives
Serbian	Akim (Аким)	and diminutives
Serbian	Aćim (Аћим)	and diminutives
Serbian	Jaćim (Јаћим)	and diminutives
Spanish	Joaquín	
Swedish	Joakim	
Swedish	Joacim	
Swedish	Joachim	
Ukrainian	Ioakim (Йоаким)	
Ukrainian	Iakim (Яким)	

== See also ==
- Joachim (surname)
- Patriarch Joachim (disambiguation)
- Prince Joachim (disambiguation)
- Hakim (name)
- Joakim
- Joaquim
- Joaquín
