= San Joaquín (disambiguation) =

San Joaquín is a commune of Chile.

San Joaquín may also refer to:

- San Joaquín, Corozal, Belize
- San Joaquín Municipality, Beni, Bolivia
- San Joaquín, Querétaro, Mexico
- San Joaquín, Carabobo, Venezuela
- San Joaquín de Flores, Costa Rica
- San Joaquín, Ecuador, Ecuador

== See also ==
- San Joaquin (disambiguation)
