= Joachim (disambiguation) =

Joachim was the husband of Saint Anne and the father of Mary, the mother of Jesus.

Joachim may also refer to:

== People and fictional characters ==
- Joachim (given name), a list of people and fictional characters
- Joachim (surname), a list of people

== Other uses ==
- Joachim (2011 storm), a European windstorm in 2011
- Joachim Creek, a river in Missouri, United States
- "Joachim" (Star Trek), an episode of the television series Star Trek

== See also ==
- Saint Joachim (disambiguation)
- Joakim, a given name
