= February 17 (Eastern Orthodox liturgics) =

Day in the Eastern Orthodox liturgical calendar

Eastern Orthodox liturgical calendar
February 16	February 17	February 18
February 17 O.S. ≍ March 2 (or March 1 (Note: in a leap year)) N.S. February 17 N.S ≍ February 4 O.S.

An Eastern Orthodox cross

February 17 in Eastern Orthodox liturgical calendars is a feast day and a day of commemoration of saints and martyrs. Although some Orthodox churches use the Revised Julian Calendar and others use the traditional Julian calendar, the fixed commemorations for their respective February 17 are broadly the same, no matter which calendar is used. (Note: Despite the dates being the same, the days to which they refer typically differ by 13 days. The notation Old Style or O.S. is sometimes used to indicate a date in the traditional Julian Calendar (the "Old Calendar"). The notation New Style or N.S. indicates a date in the Revised Julian calendar (the "New Calendar").)

== Saints ==
- Saint Mariamne, Equal to the Apostles, sister of Apostle Philip (1st century)
- Saint Auxibius of Soli, Bishop of Soli in Cyprus (102)
- Martyrs Donatus, Romulus, Secundian, and 86 Companions, at Concordia (Portogruaro), near Venice (304) (Note: "At Concordia, the holy martyrs Donatus, Secundian, and Romulus, with eighty-six others, partakers of the same crown.")
- Great-martyr Theodore the Tyro (c. 306)
- Martyr Theodoulos, at Caesarea Palestina (308) (Note: "At Caesarea, in Palestine, St. Theodulus, an aged man, in the service of the governor Firmilian. Moved by the example of the martyrs, he confessed Christ with constancy, was fastened to a cross, and thus by a noble victory merited the palm of martyrdom.")
- Saint Mesrop Mashtots of Armenia (440)
- Holy Emperor Marcian (457) and St. Pulcheria, his wife (453)
- Venerable Martyr Theocteristus, Abbot of Pelekete Monastery near Prusa (8th century) (see also: November 10 and February 28)

== Pre-Schism Western saints ==
- Martyrs Faustinus and Companions, a group of forty-five martyrs honoured in Rome. (Note: "At Rome, the passion of St. Faustinus, whom forty-four others followed to receive the crown of martyrdom.")
- Saint Lommán of Trim (Luman), a nephew of St Patrick and the first Bishop of Trim in Meath in Ireland (c. 450)
- Saint Habet-Deus, Bishop of Luna in Tuscany in Italy, probably martyred by the Arian Vandals (c. 500)
- Saint Fortchern, Bishop of Trim in Ireland, he later lived as a hermit (6th century)
- Saint Guevrock (Gueroc; Kerric), Abbot of Loc-Kirec, he also helped St Paul of Léon (6th century) (Note: "Guevrock was a native of Great Britain, who followed his master St. Tugdual to Brittany, and was named by him Superior of a new monastery in the place since called Loc-Kiric. He lived in seclusion until called by St. Paul of Léon to assist him in the government of his diocese. In the exercise of this duty he exhibited great zeal and charity, and was favoured with miraculous gifts. He was attending the Bishop in his visitation when seized with his last illness at a place called Landerneau. There he gave up his soul to God, but his body was conveyed to his own Abbey of Loc-Kiric. His relics were preserved with veneration for a length of time, but were lost during the invasions and civil disturbances which occurred at a later period.")
- Saint Fintan of Clonenagh, a disciple of St Columba, he led the life of a hermit in Clonenagh in Leix in Ireland, Confessor (603) (Note: Numerous disciples attached themselves to this ascetic and he became their abbot.)
- Saint Finan of Lindisfarne, Bishop of Lindisfarne (661) (Note: Born in Ireland, he became a monk at Iona in Scotland and succeeded St Aidan in the Northumbrian Church. With St Cedd and others he enlightened parts of the south of England.)
- Saint Silvinus of Auchy, enlightener of the area near Thérouanne, then a monastic in the Benedictine abbey of Auchy-les-Moines (fr) (c. 718) (Note: A courtier who gave up his worldly life to preach the Gospel. He enlightened the area near Thérouanne in the north of France. After some forty years of unceasing work, during which he paid the ransoms of many slaves, he went to the monastery of Auchy-les-Moines, where he lived the few remaining years of his life as a monk.)

== Post-Schism Orthodox saints ==
- St. Euxiphius I, Bishop and Wonderworker, listed in some synaxaria as one of the "300 Allemagne Saints" in Cyprus (late 12th century) (Note: The 300 Allemagne Saints came to Cyprus from Palestine, and lived as ascetics in various parts of the island. According to some of their lives in the Great Synaxaristes, after the dissolution of the Second Crusade (1147 - 1149), they decided to live the monastic life in the Jordan desert. However since the Latins there disturbed them, they relocated to Cyprus and dispersed over the island. Included among the "300 Allemagne Saints" are: Venerable Anastasios the Wonderwoker of Cyprus, September 17; Venerable Abbacum the Ascetic of Cyprus, Wonderworker, December 2; Venerable Cassian the Martyr (Kassianos), December 4; Venerable Calantius of Tamassos (Kalandios), April 26; Martyr Constantine of Cyprus (Constantine of Allemagne), Wonderworker, July 1) (see also: September 17)
- Venerable Theodore the Silent, of the Kiev Caves Monastery (13th century)
- Venerable Theodosius, monastic founder at Mt. Kelifarevo (1363), (Note: See also: November 27.) and his disciple St. Romanus (c. 1370), of Turnovo, Bulgaria.
- New Martyr Michael Mavroeidis of Adrianopolis (1490)
- Saint Hermogenes of Moscow, Patriarch and Wonderworker of Moscow and all Russia (1612)
- New Martyr Theodore of Byzantium, at Mytilene (1795)
- New Hieromartyr Theodore of Adjara, Hieromonk, at Mt. Athos (1822) (Note: The Holy Synod of the Georgian Apostolic Orthodox Church canonized Holy Martyr Theodore on October 17, 2002.)
- Venerable Barnabas, Elder of Gethsemane Skete, of St. Sergius Lavra (1906)
- Saint Nicholas Planas, Priest, of Athens (1932) (Note: (in Russian) Планас, Николай (Russian Wikipedia).) (Note: Troparion (tone 5): "Let us praise our protector, the godly Nicholas; as one endowed with blest virtue, he shone forth as a true priest of the Most High God, and was his fervent worshipper. For, by his holy life on earth, he hath left us most sublime, divine and unfailing teachings of long suffering, meekness, patience, unfeigned humility and true God-like love." Kontakion (tone 3): "Humble of spirit and pure of heart, illustrious in life and dispassionate of a truth, wast thou, O wise one. Thou didst illumine all by thy virtues and dost grant grace unto them that draw nigh unto thee; and by thine intercessions, thou dost heal them that call upon thee, O Father Nicholas.") (see also: March 2 - New Calendar date)
- New Hieromartyr Joseph Zograph of Dionysiou, Hieromonk, at Mt. Athos (1819)

=== New martyrs and confessors ===
- New Hieromartyr Paul Kosminkov, Archpriest, of Lystsevo, Moscow (1938)
- New Hieromartyr Michael Nikologorsky, Priest (1938)
- Martyr Anna Chetverikov (1940) (see also: February 18)

== Other commemorations ==
- Uncovering of the relics (867–869) of Martyr Menas the Most Eloquent, of Alexandria (ca. 313)
- Weeping "Tikhvin" Icon of the Most Holy Theotokos, at the Kozak Skete of St. Elias on Mt. Athos.
- Repose of Elder Agapitus of the Kiev Caves (1887)
- Repose of Schemamonk John (Shova) of Kolitsou Skete, Mt. Athos (2009)

== Icon gallery ==
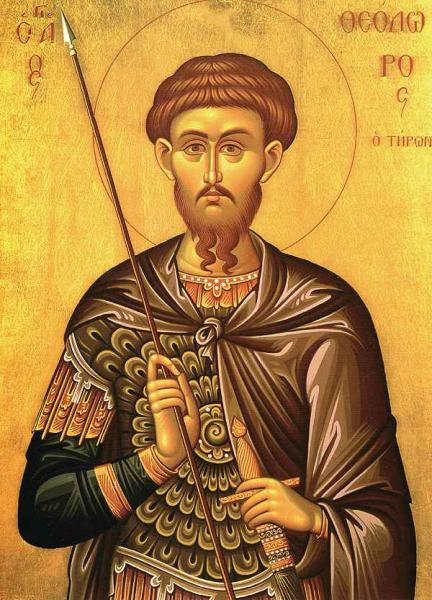
Great-martyr Theodore the Tyro.

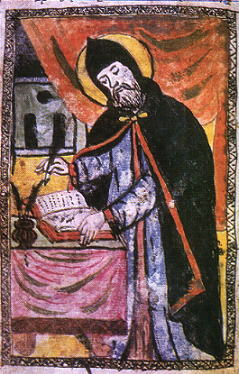
St. Mesrop Mashtots of Armenia.

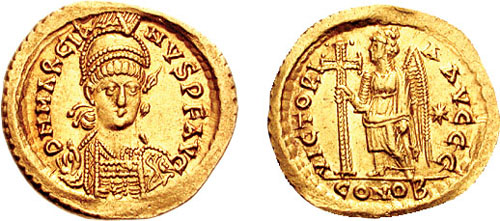
Solidus of Emperor Marcian.

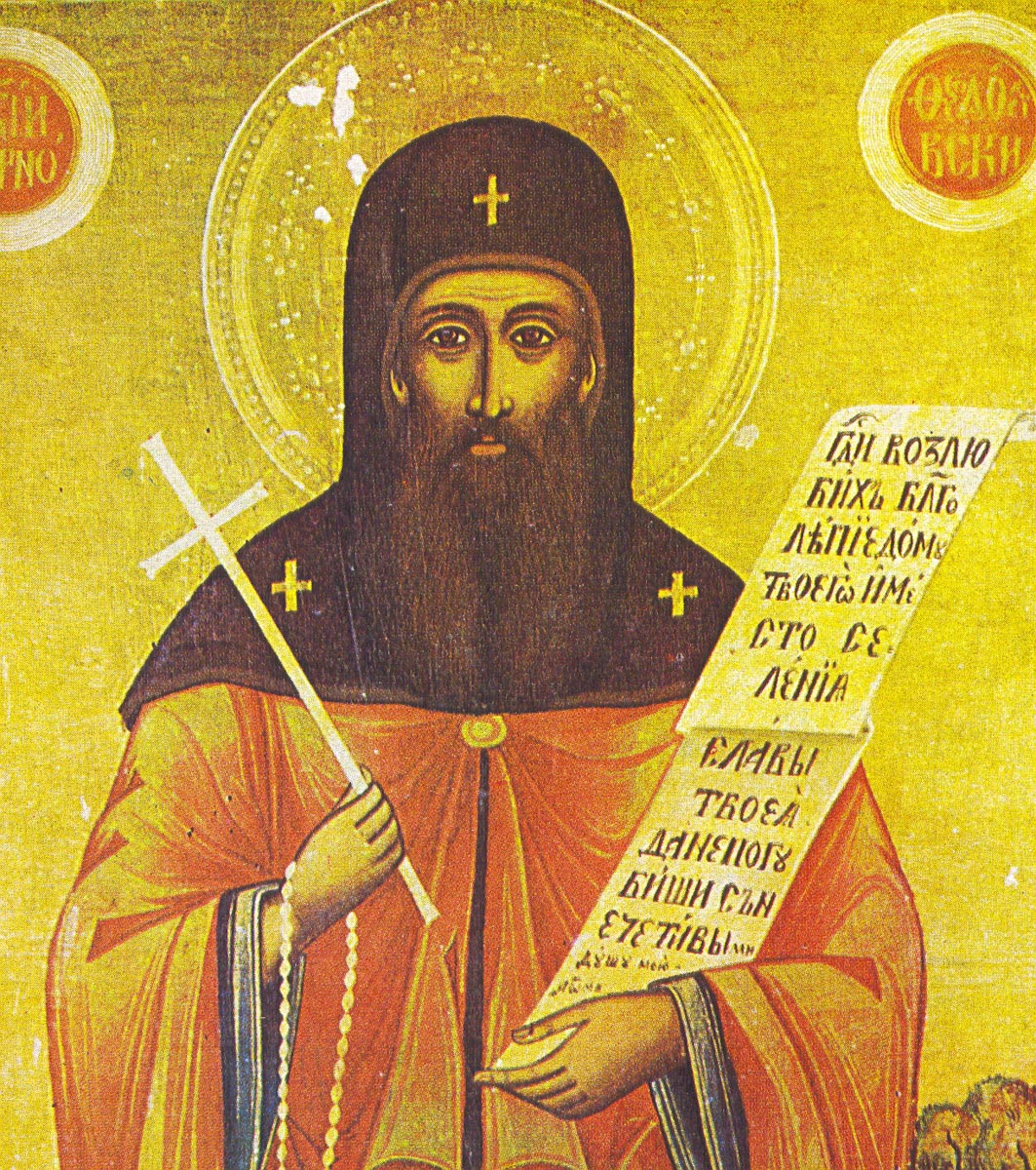
Venerable Theodosius of Turnovo, monastic founder at Mt. Kelifarevo

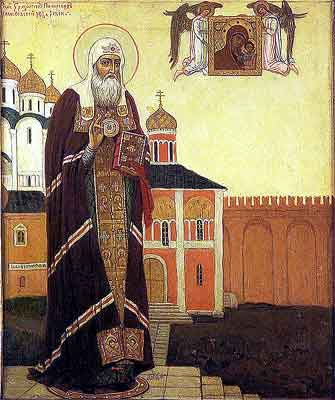
Saint Hermogenes of Moscow, Patriarch and Wonderworker of Moscow and all Russia.

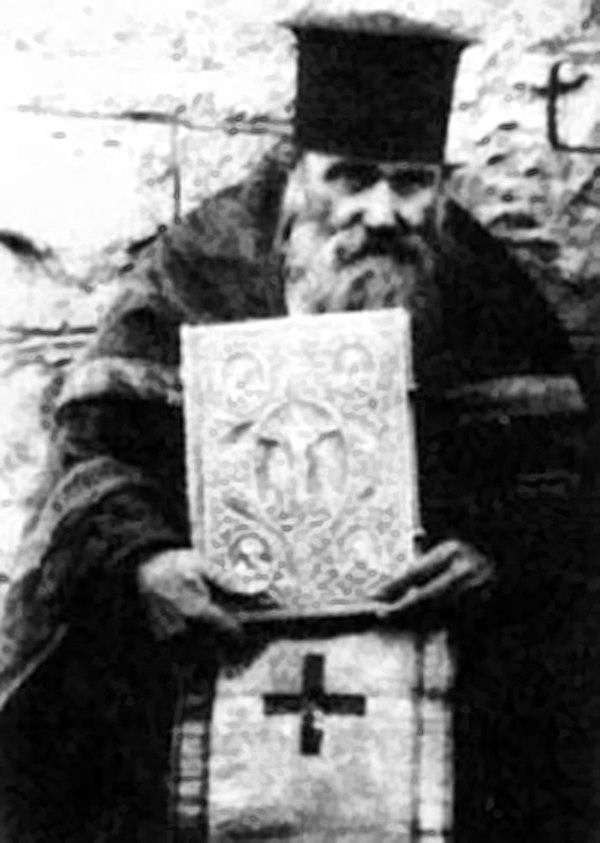
Saint Nicholas Planas of Athens (1851–1932).

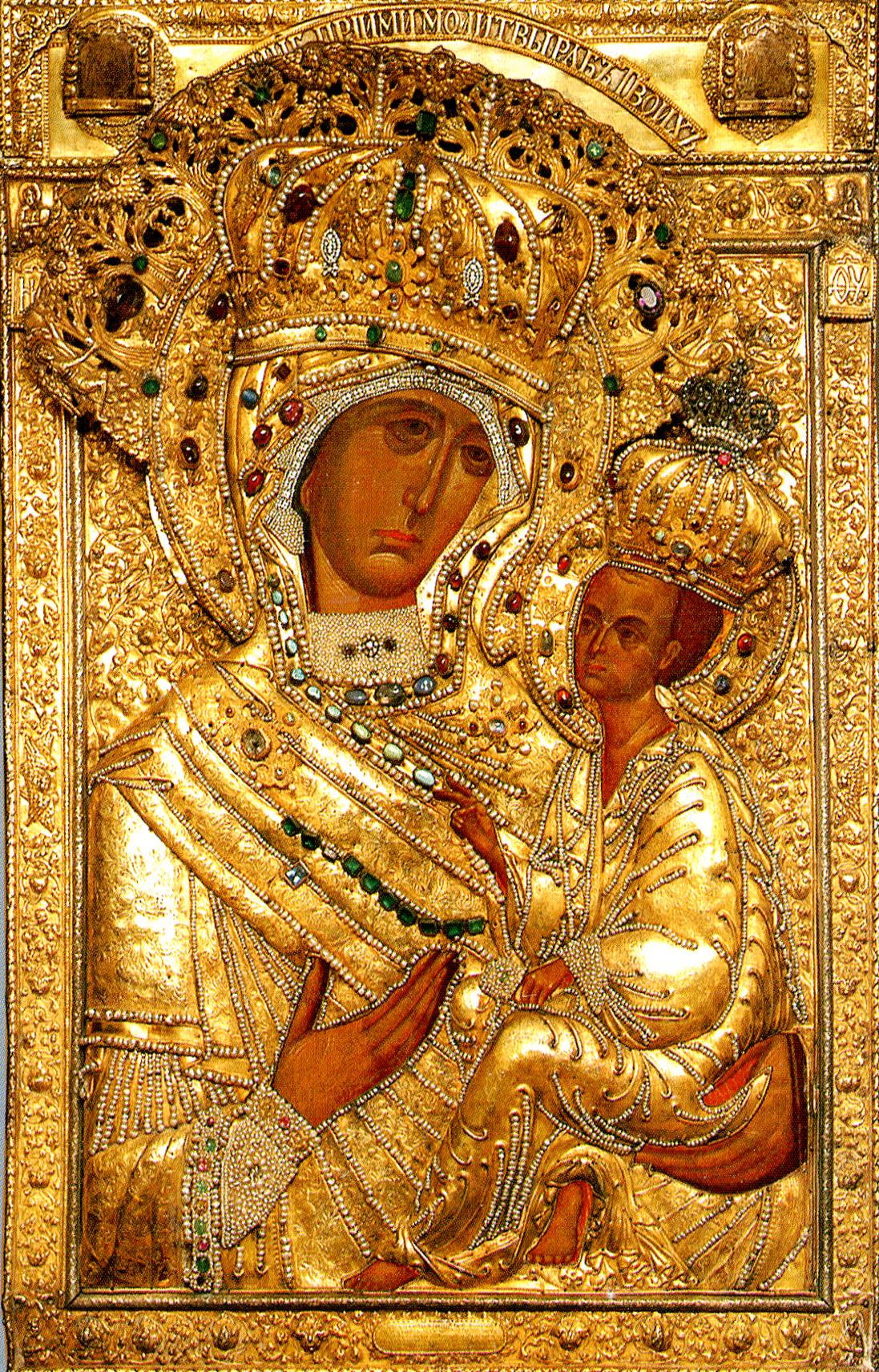
The Theotokos of Tikhvin in the golden riza.

== Sources ==
- February 17 / March 2. Orthodox Calendar (pravoslavie.ru).
- March 2 / February 17. Holy Trinity Russian Orthodox Church (A parish of the Patriarchate of Moscow).
- February 17. OCA - The Lives of the Saints.
- The Autonomous Orthodox Metropolia of Western Europe and the Americas. St. Hilarion Calendar of Saints for the year of our Lord 2004. St. Hilarion Press (Austin, TX). pp. 15-16.
- The Seventeenth Day of the Month of February. Orthodoxy in China.
- February 17. Latin Saints of the Orthodox Patriarchate of Rome.
- The Roman Martyrology. Transl. by the Archbishop of Baltimore. Last Edition, According to the Copy Printed at Rome in 1914. Revised Edition, with the Imprimatur of His Eminence Cardinal Gibbons. Baltimore: John Murphy Company, 1916. pp. 50-51.
- Rev. Richard Stanton. A Menology of England and Wales, or, Brief Memorials of the Ancient British and English Saints Arranged According to the Calendar, Together with the Martyrs of the 16th and 17th Centuries. London: Burns & Oates, 1892. pp. 72-74.

Greek Sources

- Great Synaxaristes: (in Greek) 17 Φεβρουαρίου. Μεγασ Συναξαριστησ.
- (in Greek) Συναξαριστής. 17 Φεβρουαρίου. ecclesia.gr. (H Εκκλησια Τησ Ελλαδοσ).

Russian Sources

- (in Russian) 2 марта (17 февраля). Православная Энциклопедия под редакцией Патриарха Московского и всея Руси Кирилла (электронная версия). (Orthodox Encyclopedia - Pravenc.ru).
- (in Russian) 17 февраля (ст.ст.) 2 марта 2014 (нов. ст.). Русская Православная Церковь Отдел внешних церковных связей.
