= March 2 (Eastern Orthodox liturgics) =

Day in the Eastern Orthodox liturgical calendar

Eastern Orthodox liturgical calendar
March 1	March 2	March 3
March 2 O.S. ≍ March 15 N.S. March 2 N.S ≍ February 17 (or February 18 (Note: in a leap year)) O.S.

An Eastern Orthodox cross

March 2 in Eastern Orthodox liturgical calendars is a feast day and a day of commemoration of saints and martyrs. Although some Orthodox churches use the Revised Julian Calendar and others use the traditional Julian calendar, the fixed commemorations for their respective March 2 are broadly the same, no matter which calendar is used. (Note: Despite the dates being the same, the days to which they refer typically differ by 13 days. The notation Old Style or O.S. is sometimes used to indicate a date in the traditional Julian Calendar (the "Old Calendar"). The notation New Style or N.S. indicates a date in the Revised Julian calendar (the "New Calendar").)

== Saints ==
- Hieromartyrs Nestor the Bishop, and Tribiminus the Deacon, at Perge in Pamphylia (ca. 250)
- Martyr Troadius of Neo-Caesarea, and those with him (251)
- Virgin-martyr Euthalia of Sicily (252)
- St. Cointus of Phrygia (Quintus of Phrygia), Confessor and Wonderworker (283)
- Martyr Hesychius the Senator (the Palatine), of Antioch (ca. 304) (Note: Kontakion. Fourth Tone. "When thou didst follow in the steps of the Martyrs, thou didst ascend unto the heights of divine love, which made thee Godlike, O most wise Hesychius; when thou didst forsake the court of a king that was earthly, thou wast honoured in the courts of the King of the Angels; and cast into the river, thou didst find the living water of true and eternal life.") (see also: May 10)
- Hiero-Confessor Theodotus, Bishop of Cyrenia in Cyprus (c. 326)
- Venerable Saints Andronicus and the Athanasia (5th century) (Note: Saints Andronikos and Athanasia were virtuous spouses, who came from Antioch in Syria. St. Andronikos' profession was that of a money-changer, and his spouse lived always according to God. The wealth that the Lord had granted them did not fill their hearts with pride and conceit. They had two children by their marriage, however both of them died. This grieved the Saints greatly, who thereafter sought solace on their pilgrimage to the Holy Land. From there they arrived in Egypt, where they both agreed to become monastics. The Venerable Andronikos went to the monastery of Abba Daniel, and the Blessed Athanasia to the Convent of Tabennisi. They feel asleep in peace.) (see also: October 9)
- Saint Agathon of Egypt, monk (5th century)

== Pre-Schism Western saints ==
- Martyrs of Rome, a large number of martyrs martyred in Rome under Alexander Severus and the prefect Ulpian (219) (Note: "Also at Rome, under the emperor Alexander, and the prefect Ulpian, many holy martyrs, who were a long time tortured, and then condemned to capital punishment.")
- Saints Jovinus and Basileus, two martyrs who suffered in Rome under Gallienus and Valerian, buried on the Latin Way (258)
- Saints Paul, Heraclius, Secundilla and Januaria, martyrs who suffered under Diocletian at Porto Romano at the mouth of the Tiber in Italy (305)
- Saint Gistilian (Gistlian), uncle of St David and a monk at Menevia, or St Davids, in Wales (5th-6th centuries)
- Saint Joavan, a Romano-Briton who went to Brittany to live with his uncle St Paul of Léon, by whom he was consecrated bishop (ca. 570) (Note: "ST. JOAVAN is said to have been a native of Ireland, and to have professed the religious state at Landevenic, in Brittany. He went, however, to Great Britain and became the disciple of St. Paul, afterwards Bishop of Leon. When the latter Saint went over to Brittany, Joavan accompanied him, and in time became his coadjutor and successor in the diocese of Leon. When released from his charge by a holy death, his body was conveyed to a place called Plougen, and buried under a tomb, which may still be seen there. This sepulchre is held in great veneration by the people, but the sacred relics have disappeared and can nowhere be traced. There are two parishes dedicated to St. Joavan, and he is venerated in other parts of Upper Brittany. His festival is kept on the 2nd March.")
- 440 Martyrs slain by the Lombards in Italy (Martyrs of Campania) (ca. 579) (Note: "In their ravages about the year 597, they attempted to compel forty husbandmen, whom they had made captives, to eat meats which had been offered to idols. The faithful servants of Christ constantly refusing to comply, were all massacred. Such meats might, in some circumstances, have been eaten without sin, but not when this was exacted out of a motive of superstition. The same barbarians endeavoured to oblige another company of captives to adore the head of a goat, which was their favourite idol, and about which they walked, singing, and bending their knees before it; but the Christians chose rather to die than purchase their lives by offending God. They are said to have been about four hundred in number.")
- Saint Fergna, called 'the White', a relative and disciple of St Columba of Ireland, Abbot of Iona (637)
- Saint Chad (Ceadda), Bishop of Lichfield, England (672)
- Saint Cynibil (Cynibild), a brother of Sts Chad and Cedd who helped enlighten England (7th century)
- Saint Willeic, a disciple of St Swithbert who made him Abbot of Kaiserwerth in Germany (726)
- Saint Slebhene (Sléibíne mac Congaile), a monk from Ireland, he became Abbot of Iona in Scotland (767)

== Post-Schism Orthodox saints ==
- Venerable Arsenius, Bishop of Tver (1409)
- Venerable Sabbatius, monk of Tver (1434), and his disciple St. Euphrosynus (1460)
- Venerable Barsanuphius (1459) and Sabbas (1467), Abbots of Tver.
- Venerable Abramios of Spassk, of the monastery of Christ the Saviour, Russia (16th century)
- New Martyr Theodore Sladić of Komogovina (1788) (Note: He is remembered on Theodore's Saturday (Тодорова субота), which falls on the first Saturday of Great Lent.)
- Venerable Joachim (Papoulakis) of Ithaca, monk of Vatopedi (Mt. Athos) and Ithaca (1868)
- Saint Ambrose (Khelaia) the Confessor, Catholicos-Patriarch of All Georgia (1927) (see also: March 16 and March 27)
- Saint Nicholas Planas of Athens (1932) (Note: His feast day is celebrated on March 2, except when it falls during Great Lent period; then it is celebrated on the first Sunday following March 2. As a local saint of Paronaxia, he is also celebrated on the first Sunday of September, as part of the celebration of the island's five key saints at the Church of St. Nikodemus of the Holy Mountain on the island of Naxos in Greece.) (Note: Troparion (tone 5): "Let us praise our protector, the godly Nicholas; as one endowed with blest virtue, he shone forth as a true priest of the Most High God, and was his fervent worshipper. For, by his holy life on earth, he hath left us most sublime, divine and unfailing teachings of long suffering, meekness, patience, unfeigned humility and true God-like love." Kontakion (tone 3): "Humble of spirit and pure of heart, illustrious in life and dispassionate of a truth, wast thou, O wise one. Thou didst illumine all by thy virtues and dost grant grace unto them that draw nigh unto thee; and by thine intercessions, thou dost heal them that call upon thee, O Father Nicholas.") (see also: February 17)

== Other commemorations ==
- Repose of Abbess Philareta of Ufa (1890)
- Appearance of the Kolomenskoye “Reigning” Icon of the Most Holy Theotokos (1917)

== Icon gallery ==
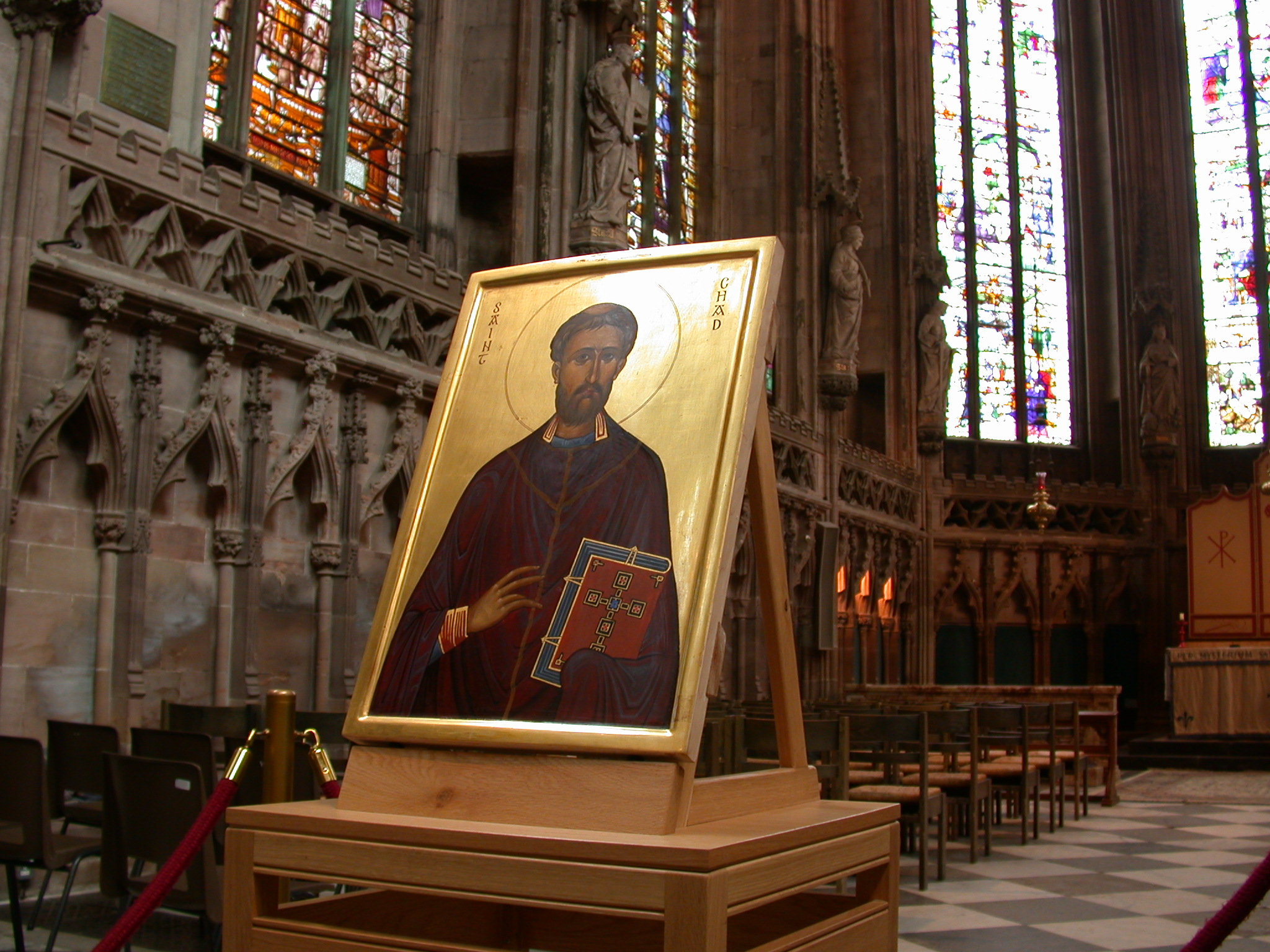
St. Chad, Bishop of Lichfield.

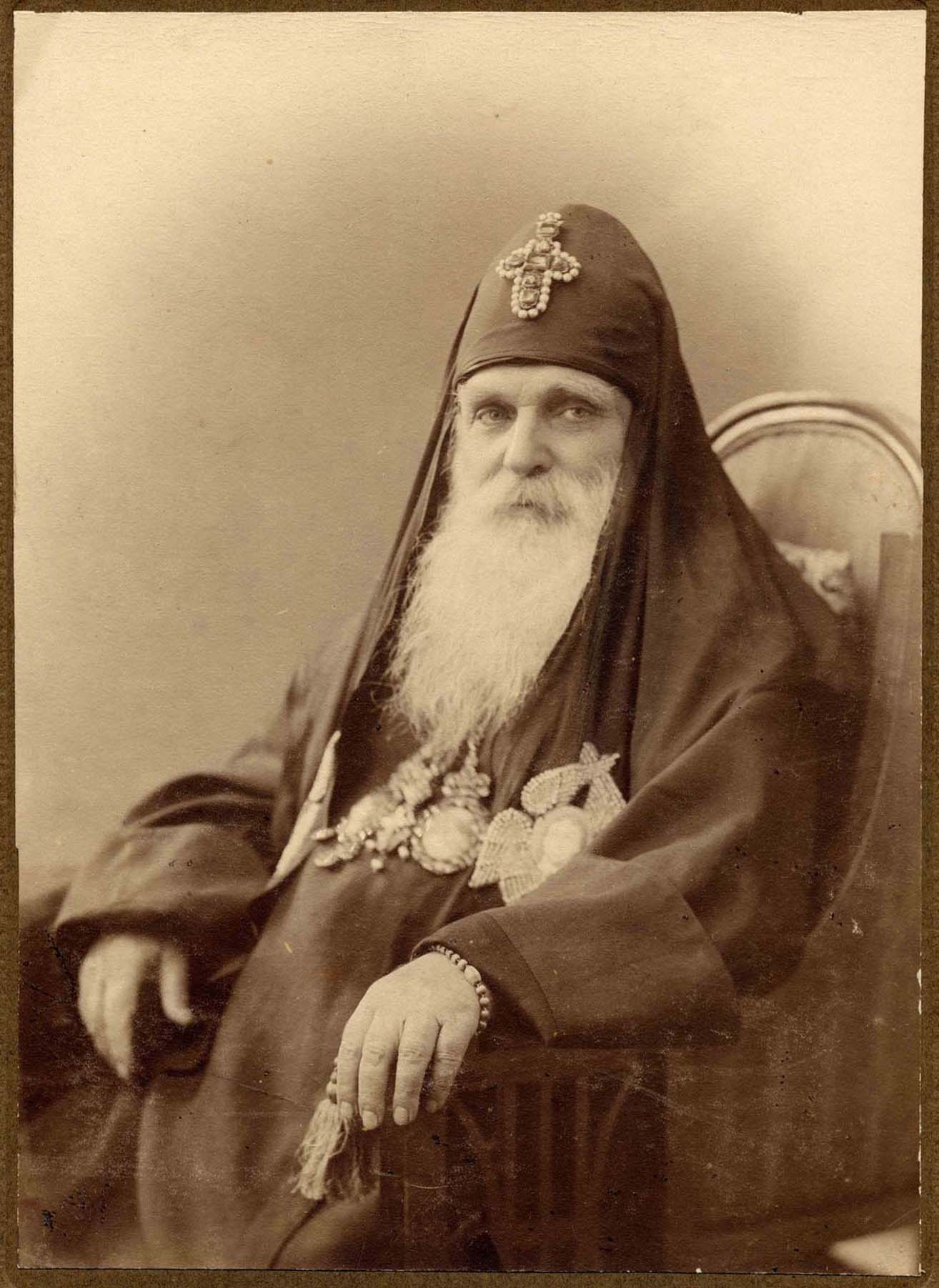
Ambrosius, Catholicos-Patriarch of All Georgia.

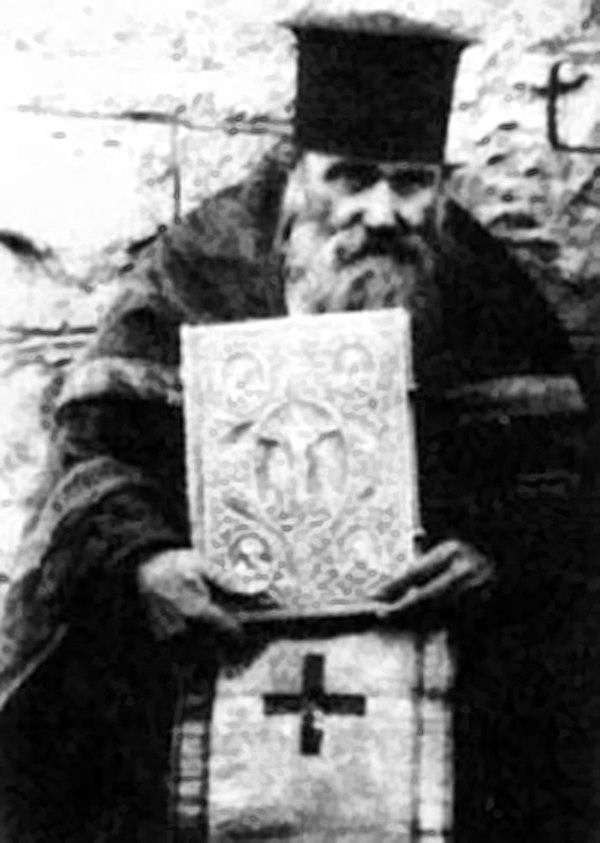
Saint Nicholas Planas of Athens (1851–1932).

== Sources ==
- March 2/March 15. Orthodox Calendar (PRAVOSLAVIE.RU).
- March 15 / March 2. HOLY TRINITY RUSSIAN ORTHODOX CHURCH (A parish of the Patriarchate of Moscow).
- March 2. OCA - The Lives of the Saints.
- The Autonomous Orthodox Metropolia of Western Europe and the Americas (ROCOR). St. Hilarion Calendar of Saints for the year of our Lord 2004. St. Hilarion Press (Austin, TX). p. 19.
- March 2. Latin Saints of the Orthodox Patriarchate of Rome.
- The Roman Martyrology. Transl. by the Archbishop of Baltimore. Last Edition, According to the Copy Printed at Rome in 1914. Revised Edition, with the Imprimatur of His Eminence Cardinal Gibbons. Baltimore: John Murphy Company, 1916. p. 63.
- Rev. Richard Stanton. A Menology of England and Wales, or, Brief Memorials of the Ancient British and English Saints Arranged According to the Calendar, Together with the Martyrs of the 16th and 17th Centuries. London: Burns & Oates, 1892. pp. 95–98.

=== Greek Sources ===
- Great Synaxaristes: (in Greek) 2 ΜΑΡΤΙΟΥ. ΜΕΓΑΣ ΣΥΝΑΞΑΡΙΣΤΗΣ.
- (in Greek) Συναξαριστής. 2 Μαρτίου. ECCLESIA.GR. (H ΕΚΚΛΗΣΙΑ ΤΗΣ ΕΛΛΑΔΟΣ).

=== Russian Sources ===
- (in Russian) 15 марта (2 марта). Православная Энциклопедия под редакцией Патриарха Московского и всея Руси Кирилла (электронная версия). (Orthodox Encyclopedia - Pravenc.ru).
- (in Russian) 2 марта (ст.ст.) 15 марта 2013 (нов. ст.). Русская Православная Церковь Отдел внешних церковных связей. (DECR).
