= Joachim Ernest =

Joachim Ernest may refer to:

- Joachim Ernest, Prince of Anhalt (1536–1586), German prince of the House of Ascania
- Joachim Ernest, Duke of Schleswig-Holstein-Sonderburg-Plön (1595–1671), first Duke of Schleswig-Holstein-Plön

== See also ==
- Joachim Ernst, Duke of Anhalt
- Joachim (given name)
