= Saint Joavan =

Saint Joavan may refer to:

- Saint Joavan (died c. 562), Irish priest and bishop in Brittany.
- Jovan Vladimir (990–1016), ruler of Duklja, Serbian principality
