= San Joaquín Municipality =

San Joaquín Municipality may refer to:

- San Joaquín Municipality, Beni, Bolivia
- San Joaquín Municipality, Querétaro, Mexico
- San Joaquín Municipality, Carabobo, Venezuela
