= Joachim (surname) =

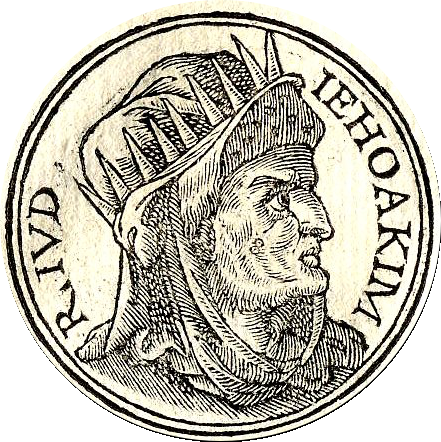
- The Biblical king Jehoiakim
- Pronunciation: [ˈd͡ʒoʊ̯.ə.kɪm] or [ˈjoʊ̯.kɪm]

Origin
- Languages: German, English, French

Other names
- Derived: Jehoiakim

Joachim is a Germanic surname, ultimately derived from the Biblical king Jehoiakim. It is used in the German, French, and English languages. Pronunciation varies, and may be [ˈd͡ʒoʊ̯.ə.kɪm] or [ˈjoʊ̯.kɪm]. One of the first people documented with this name was a man from the Dordogne region of France and emigrated to Canada in 1665.

People with the surname include:

- Amalie Joachim (1839–1899), Austrian-German contralto and voice teacher, wife of Joseph
- Attila Joachim (1923–1947), Hungarian Holocaust victim
- Aurélien Joachim (born 1986), Luxembourgish footballer
- Benoît Joachim (born 1976), Luxembourgish professional road racing cyclist
- Charlie Joachim (1920–2002), American basketball player
- Ferenc Joachim (1882–1964), Hungarian painter of portraits and landscapes
- Harold H. Joachim (1868–1938), British idealist philosopher
- Irène Joachim (1913–2001), French soprano; grand-daughter of the violinist Joseph Joachim
- Joseph Joachim (1831–1907), Hungarian violinist, conductor, composer and teacher, husband of Amalie
- Joseph Joachim (1834–1904), Swiss author
- Julian Joachim (born 1974), English professional footballer
- Otto Joachim (composer) (1910–2010), German-born Canadian musician and composer of electronic music
- Suresh Joachim (born 1968), Canadian film actor, producer and multiple-Guinness World Record holder

== See also ==
- Joachim (given name)
- Joachim genannt Thalbach (disambiguation)
- Caroline M. Yoachim, American writer
- Jauch, a surname derived from the shortened form of Joachim
