= Joachim genannt Thalbach =

Joachim genannt Thalbach may refer to:

- Anna Maria Joachim genannt Thalbach (born 1973), German actress known as Anna Thalbach
- Katharina Joachim genannt Thalbach (born 1954), German actress and stage director known as Katharina Thalbach
- Nellie Joachim genannt Thalbach (born 1995), German actress known as Nellie Thalbach
- Sabine Joachim genannt Thalbach (1932–1966), German actress known as Sabine Thalbach

== See also ==
- Joachim (surname)
- Thalbach (disambiguation)
