= Saint Joachim (disambiguation) =

Saint Joachim, Saint-Joachim or St. Joachim may refer to:

- Joachim, in Christianity, the father of Mary, the mother of Jesus
- Joachim of Ithaca (1786–1868), Greek saint of the Eastern Orthodox Church
- Joachim of Korsun, first bishop of Novgorod the Great, saint of the Russian Orthodox Church
- Saint-Joachim, a commune in France
- Saint-Joachim, Quebec, a parish municipality in Quebec, Canada
- St. Joachim, a community in the town of Lakeshore, Ontario, Canada
- Saint Joachim (Wautier), a painting by the Flemish artist Michaelina Wautier

== See also ==
- Saint-Joachim-de-Shefford, Quebec, a municipality in Quebec, Canada
