= Talbach =

Talbach may refer to:

- Talbach (Ablach, Göggingen), a river of Baden-Württemberg, Germany, right tributary of the Ablach in Göggingen
- Talbach (Ablach, Menningen), a river of Baden-Württemberg, Germany, left tributary of the Ablach in Menningen

== See also ==
- Thalbach
- Joachim genannt Thalbach (disambiguation)
