= Aćimović =

- Language: Serbian

Origin
- Meaning: Son of Aćim
- Region of origin: Serbia

Aćimović (Serbian: Аћимовић, romanized: Aćimović, lit. 'Son of Aćim') is a Serbian surname, a patronymic derived from the given name Aćim. It is spelt Ačimovič in Slovenia. It may refer to:

- Gorica Aćimović (born 1985), Austrian handball player of Bosnian Serb origin
- Jovan Aćimović (born 1948), Serbian footballer
- Mateo Aćimović (born 2007), Slovenian footballer
- Milan Aćimović (1898–1945), Serbian politician
- Milenko Aćimović (born 1977), Slovenian Serb footballer
