= Jauch =

Jauch is a German language surname. It has two origins. By the first source, is a topographic surname, from Swiss German, referring to Middle High German jūch, meaning a unit of land. The second source is an eastern German shortened form of the name Joachim. Its main distribution is in Germany ad switzerland.

== Families ==
- The Jauch family, an important family in German and Hanseatic history

== Notable people ==
- Erin Jauch, American trampolining gymnast
- Günther Jauch, German television host
- Heinrich Jauch, state attorney in the Third Reich
- Joachim Daniel von Jauch, German Baroque architect
- Josef-Maria Jauch, Swiss physicist
- Ray Jauch, American football coach
- Rebecca Jauch, American politician
- Robert Jauch, American state legislator from Wisconsin

== See also ==
- Yock, an Americanized version of Jauch
