= Yock (surname) =

Yock is an Americanized version of the German surname Joch or Jauch.

Notable people with the surname include:

- Ben Yock (born 1975), New Zealand cricketer
- Daniel Alfred Yock (1975–1993), Australian aboriginal youth
- Robert J. Yock (born 1938), American judge
