= February 18 (Eastern Orthodox liturgics) =

Day in the Eastern Orthodox liturgical calendar

Eastern Orthodox liturgical calendar
February 17	February 18	February 19
February 18 O.S. ≍ March 3 (or March 2 (Note: in a leap year)) N.S. February 18 N.S ≍ February 5 O.S.

An Eastern Orthodox cross

February 18 in Eastern Orthodox liturgical calendars is a feast day and a day of commemoration of saints and martyrs. Although some Orthodox churches use the Revised Julian Calendar and others use the traditional Julian calendar, the fixed commemorations for their respective February 18 are broadly the same, no matter which calendar is used. (Note: Despite the dates being the same, the days to which they refer typically differ by 13 days. The notation Old Style or O.S. is sometimes used to indicate a date in the traditional Julian Calendar (the "Old Calendar"). The notation New Style or N.S. indicates a date in the Revised Julian calendar (the "New Calendar").)

== Saints ==
- Martyrs Leo and Parigorius of Patara in Lycia (c. 258)
- Venerable Agapitus the Confessor and Wonderworker, Bishop of Synnada in Phrygia (c. 308–324)
- Martyrs Victor, Dorotheus, Theodoulus, and Agrippa, at Synnada in Phrygia Salutaris, who suffered under Licinius (c. 308–324)
- Martyr Piulius (Publius), by the sword.
- Saint Flavian the Confessor, Archbishop of Constantinople (c. 449) (Note: "At Constantinople, the holy bishop Flavian, who for having defended the Catholic faith at Ephesus, was buffeted and kicked by the partisans of the impious Dioscorus, and being banished, ended his life within three days.") (see also: February 16)
- Saint Leo the Great, Pope of Rome (461) (Note: Probably born in Tuscany in Italy, he became Bishop of Rome in 440. He fought against many heresies. His celebrated Tomos defined the Orthodox belief in the Two Natures and One Person of Christ. It was acclaimed as the teaching of the Orthodox Church at the Council of Chalcedon in 451. The most famous event of his life was his meeting with Attila outside the gates of Rome which resulted in the salvation of the city in 452.) (see also: November 10 - West)
- Saint Blaise of Amorion and Mt. Athos (c. 908)

== Pre-Schism Western saints ==
- Saints Maximus, Claudius, Praepedigna, Alexander and Cutias, martyrs in Rome who suffered under Diocletian (295) (Note: "At Ostia, the holy martyrs Maximus and his brother Claudius, and Praepedigna, the wife of Claudius, with her two sons Alexander and Cutias, all of an illustrious family. By the order of Diocletian, they were apprehended and sent into exile. Afterwards being burned alive, they offered to God the sweet-smelling sacrifice of martyrdom. Their remains were cast into the river, but the Christians found them and buried them near that city.") (see also: August 11)
- Saints Lucius, Silvanus, Rutulus, Classicus, Secundinus, Fructulus and Maximus, martyrs in North Africa.
- Saint Helladius of Toledo, Archbishop of Toledo and Confessor (632) (Note: Born in Toledo in Spain, he served at the court of the Visigothic Kings. He loved to visit the monastery of Agali (Agallia) near Toledo on the banks of the Tagus. Eventually he became a monk there and then abbot (605). In 615 he became Archbishop of Toledo.)
- Saint Colman of Lindisfarne, Bishop of Lindisfarne and Confessor (676) (Note: Born in Connaught in Ireland, he became a monk at Iona in Scotland. He was then chosen as third Abbot of Lindisfarne in England. He later returned to Ireland, founding a monastery on Innisboffin Island for Irish monks and a monastery for English monks (Mayo of the Saxons).)
- Saint Ethelina (Eudelme), the patroness of Little Sodbury, now in Gloucestershire in England.
- Saint Angilbert, Abbot of St. Riquier in the north of France where there were some 300 monks (c. 740–814)

== Post-Schism Orthodox saints ==
- Venerable Cosmas, founder of Yakhromsk Monastery (ru), Vladimir (1492) (Note: See: (in Russian): Косма Яхромский. Википедии, (Russian Wikipedia).)
- Saint Nicholas V of Georgia, Catholicos of Georgia (1591)

=== New martyrs and confessors ===
- New Hieromartyr Alexander Medvedsky, Priest (1932)
- New Hiero-confessor Vladimir (Terentiev), Abbot, of Zosima Hermitage (1933)
- New Hieromartyr Benjamin, Hieromonk (1938)
- Virgin-martyr Anna (1940)

== Other commemorations ==
- Commemoration of the New Martyrs who suffered during the "Holy Night" in St. Petersburg (1932) (Note: "The 'Holy Night', so called by the people, was on the night of the 17–18 February 1932. It is a radiant yet terrible date, the Passion Friday of Russian Monasticism - ignored by all and almost unknown to the whole world - when all of Russian monasticism in a single night disappeared in to the concentration camps. It was all done in the dead of night and with the full knowledge of Metropolitan Alexis (later Patriarch Alexis I of Moscow) - about which there is sufficient evidence. In Leningrad there were arrested: 40 monks of the St Alexander Nevsky Lavra; 12 monks of the Kiev metochion (the other monks had all been arrested in 1930); 10 monks from the Valaam metochion; 90 nuns of the Novodevichy Convent; 16 nuns of Abbess Taisia's Leushinsky metochion; 12 monks from St Theodore's Cathedral; 8 monks from the "Kinovia" of the St Alexander Nevsky Lavra's "Big Okhotko"; a hundred or so monastics from various other Leningrad churches. In all - 318 people. That same night all the monks and brethren of the St Macarius the Roman Monastery were arrested and brought to Leningrad as vicious criminals whose very presence was a threat to society; they were treated as deadly insects whose presence must be stamped out. The wave of arrests, like thunder, rolled over the Russian land, striking chiefly the monastic population which so recently had been the glorious guardian of the nation's morals and values. It also struck many of the white (parish) clergy and laymen who, in one way or another, were close in spirit to monasticism. For example, the flaming sermons of the parish priest Father Alexander Medvedsky were the cause of his arrest. All were sent to the Kazakhstan region from where almost no one ever returned.")
- Finding of the relics (1961) of New Martyr Irene of Mytilene (1463) (see also: May 12 - Greek)
- Repose of Schema-monk Constantine (Cavarnos), spiritual writer (2011)

== Icon gallery ==
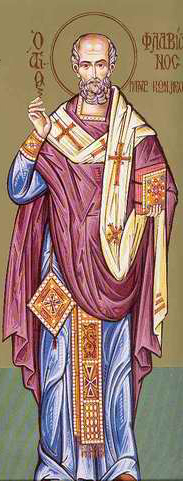
Saint Flavian the Confessor.

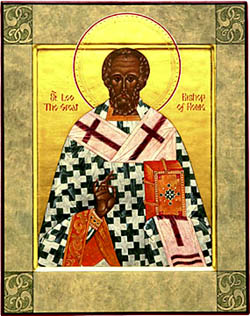
Saint Leo the Great, Pope of Rome.

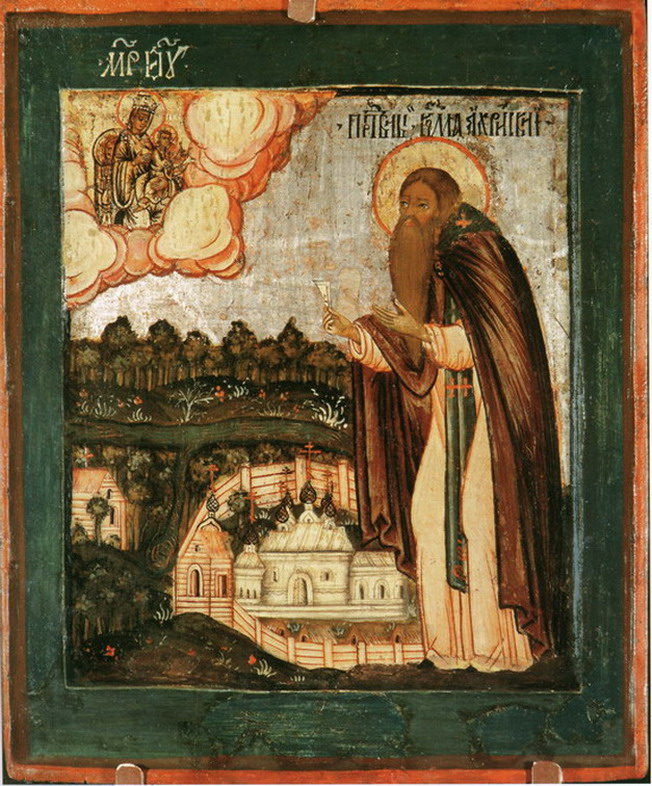
Venerable Cosmas, founder of Yakhromsk Monastery, Vladimir.

== Sources ==
- February 18 / March 3. Orthodox Calendar (Pravoslavie.ru).
- March 3 / February 18. Holy Trinity Russian Orthodox Church (A parish of the Patriarchate of Moscow).
- February 18. OCA - The Lives of the Saints.
- The Autonomous Orthodox Metropolia of Western Europe and the Americas. St. Hilarion Calendar of Saints for the year of our Lord 2004. St. Hilarion Press (Austin, TX). p. 16.
- The Eighteenth Day of the Month of February. Orthodoxy in China.
- February 18. Latin Saints of the Orthodox Patriarchate of Rome.
- The Roman Martyrology. Transl. by the Archbishop of Baltimore. Last Edition, According to the Copy Printed at Rome in 1914. Revised Edition, with the Imprimatur of His Eminence Cardinal Gibbons. Baltimore: John Murphy Company, 1916. pp. 51–52.
- Rev. Richard Stanton. A Menology of England and Wales, or, Brief Memorials of the Ancient British and English Saints Arranged According to the Calendar, Together with the Martyrs of the 16th and 17th Centuries. London: Burns & Oates, 1892. pp. 74–78.

Greek Sources

- Great Synaxaristes: (in Greek) 18 Φεβρουαρίου. Μεγασ Συναξαριστησ.
- (in Greek) Συναξαριστής. 18 Φεβρουαρίου. Ecclesia.gr. (H Εκκλησια Τησ Ελλαδοσ).

Russian Sources

- (in Russian) 3 марта (18 февраля). Православная Энциклопедия под редакцией Патриарха Московского и всея Руси Кирилла (электронная версия). (Orthodox Encyclopedia - Pravenc.ru).
- (in Russian) 18 февраля (ст.ст.) 3 марта 2014 (нов. ст.). Русская Православная Церковь Отдел внешних церковных связей. (Decr).
