= Joaquina =

- Gender: Female

Other gender
- Masculine: Joaquín

Joaquina is a feminine Spanish given name. Notable people with the name include:

- Carlota Joaquina of Spain, Consort of Portugal
- Joaquina Cabrera, mother of Guatemalan president Manuel Estrada Cabrera
- Joaquina Costa (born 1967), Spanish sprint canoeist
- Joaquina Kalukango, American actor
- Joaquina Maria Mercedes Barcelo Pages (1857–1940), Spanish nun, cofounder of the Augustinian Sisters of Our Lady of Consolation
- Joaquina Téllez-Girón, Marquise of Santa Cruz, daughter of Pedro Téllez-Girón, 9th Duke of Osuna
- Joaquina Vedruna de Mas (1783–1854), Spanish nun, founder of the Carmelite Sisters of the Charity
- Joaquina (singer-songwriter) (born 2004), Venezuelan singer-songwriter

== See also ==
- Carlota Joaquina – Princesa do Brasil, 1995 Brazilian comedy film directed and written by Carla Camurati
