= Joaquín =

Joaquin
- Pronunciation: Spanish: [xoaˈkin] English: /hwɑːˈkiːn/ whah-KEEN
- Gender: Male

Origin
- Origin: Spanish

Other names
- Related names: Joaquim, Joachim, Joaquina, Wakin

Joaquín with an accent is associated with Spanish speaking communities while Joaquin without an accent is considered English in origin. Both are male given names.

== Given name ==
- Joaquín (footballer, born 1956) (Joaquín Alonso González), Spanish football midfielder
- Joaquín (footballer, born 1981) (Joaquín Sánchez Rodríguez), Spanish football winger
- Joaquín (footballer, born 1982) (Joaquín Rodríguez Espinar), Spanish football forward
- Joaquín Almunia, Spanish politician
- Joaquín Andújar, professional baseball player in the Houston Astros organization
- Joaquín Arias, professional baseball player in the San Francisco Giants organization
- Joaquín Balaguer, President of the Dominican Republic
- Joaquín Barañao (born 1982), Chilean writer and podcaster
- Joaquín Belgrano, Argentine patriot
- Joaquín Benoit, professional baseball player for the San Diego Padres
- Joaquin Castro, American politician from San Antonio, Texas
- Joaquín Correa, Argentine football forward
- Joaquín Cortés, Spanish flamenco dancer
- Joaquín De Luz, Spanish New York City Ballet principal dancer
- Joaquin Domagoso, Filipino actor and model
- Joaquín "El Chapo" Guzmán, Mexican drug lord
- Joaquín Hernández, Mexican footballer
- Joaquín "Jack" García, Cuban-American FBI agent
- Joaquín Francisco Pacheco (1808–1865), Prime Minister of Spain
- Jaoquin Gage (born 1973), former professional ice hockey goaltender
- Joaquín Gutiérrez Cano (1920–2009), Spanish diplomat and politician
- Joaquín Lavín, Chilean politician for the Independent Democrat Union
- Joaquín Maurín, Spanish Catalan leader of the Workers' Party of Marxist Unification (POUM) and the Workers and Peasants Bloc
- Joaquín Miguel Elizalde (1896–1965), Filipino diplomat, businessman and polo player
- Joaquin Miller (1837–1913), American poet and frontiersman
- Joaquin Oliver (2000–2018), one of the 17 victims who was killed in the Stoneman Douglas High School shooting
- Joaquin Murrieta (1829–1853), Mexican-Californian 19th century outlaw
- Joaquín Pardavé (1900–1955), Mexican actor, director, songwriter and screenwriter of the Mexican cinema (1900–1955)
- Joaquin Phoenix (born 1974), American actor
- Joaquín Rodríguez Ortega (1903–1984), known as "Cagancho", Spanish bullfighter
- Joaquín Rodrigo (1901–1999), Spanish composer of classical music, especially for the guitar
- Joaquín Sabina (born 1949), Spanish singer-songwriter and poet
- Joaquín Salvador Lavado "Quino" (1932–2020), Argentine-Spanish cartoonist
- Joaquín Soria Terrazas (1910–1990), Mexican football executive and President of CONCACAF (1969–1990)
- Joaquín Sorolla (1863–1923), Spanish artist
- Joaquin Szuchman (born 1995), Israeli-Argentinian professional basketball player
- Joaquín Turina (1882–1949), Spanish composer of classical music
- Joaquín Zavala (1835–1906), President of Nicaragua

== Surname ==
- Addy Joaquín Coldwell, Mexican politician
- Carlos Joaquín González, Mexican politician
- Jaymee Joaquin, Filipina actress and TV presenter
- Nick Joaquin, Filipino author
- Pedro Joaquín Coldwell, Mexican politician
- Waldis Joaquín, Dominican baseball pitcher for the San Francisco Giants

== Fictional characters ==
- Commander Joaquin, a character in the anime Mobile Suit Gundam SEED C.E. 73: Stargazer
- Joaquín de la Vega, son of Alejandro Murrieta “Zorro” de la Vega in Mask of Zorro and The Legend of Zorro
- Joaquin Salamanca, a minor character in Breaking Bad

== See also ==
- Hurricane Joaquin
- San Joaquin (disambiguation)
- Quino (disambiguation) (diminutive form of the given name)
