= Joachim Murat (disambiguation) =

Joachim Murat may refer to:

- Joachim Murat (1767–1815), a Marshal of the Empire and Admiral during the reign of Napoleon
- Joachim, 4th Prince Murat (1834–1901), a Major-General in the French Army and a member of the Bonaparte-Murat family
- Joachim, 5th Prince Murat (1856–1932), a member of the Bonaparte-Murat family
- Joachim, 6th Prince Murat (1885–1938), a French deputy and a member of the Bonaparte-Murat family
- Joachim, 7th Prince Murat (1920–1944), a French resistance fighter and member of the Bonaparte-Murat family
- Joachim, 8th Prince Murat (born 1944), a member of the Bonaparte-Murat family
- Joachim, Prince of Pontecorvo (born 1973), a French aristocrat and member of the Bonaparte-Murat family
