= Jochen =

Jochen is a German masculine given name. Notable people with the name include:

- Jochen Asche, East German luger, competed during the 1960s
- Jochen Böhler (born 1969), German historian, specializing in the history of World War II
- Jochen Babock (born 1953), East German bobsledder
- Jochen Bachfeld (1952–2026), East German boxer
- Jochen Balke (1917–1944), German breaststroke swimmer
- Jochen Behle (born 1960), (West) German cross-country skier
- Jochen Bleicken (1926–2005), German professor of ancient history
- Jochen Borchert (born 1940), German politician and member of the CDU
- Jochen Breiholz, German opera manager
- Jochen Busse (born 1941), German television actor
- Jochen Carow (born 1944), German former footballer
- Jochen Cassel (born 1981), German badminton player
- Jochen Danneberg (born 1953), East German ski jumper
- Jochen Dornbusch, the coach for the men's Hong Kong national team
- Jochen Endreß (born 1972), German football player
- Jochen Förster (born 1942), East German slalom canoeist, competed in the 1960s and 1970s
- Jochen Fahrenberg (born 1937), German psychologist in the fields of personality and psychophysiology
- Jochen Feldhoff (born 1943), former West German handball player
- Jochen Figge (born 1947), German professional football coach
- Jochen Fraatz (born 1963), former German handball player
- Jochen Alexander Freydank, German film director
- Jochen Hasenmayer (born 1941), German cave diver
- Jochen Hecht (born 1977), German professional ice hockey player
- Jochen Heisenberg (born 1939), German physicist and Professor Emeritus of Physics at the University of New Hampshire
- Jochen Hick (born 1960), German film director and producer of mainly independent feature and documentary films
- Jochen Hippel (born 1971), musician from Kirchheimbolanden in southwest Germany
- Jochen Horst, German/English Film, TV and Theater actor
- Jochen Kühner (born 1980), German rower
- Jochen Kientz (born 1972), retired German footballer who played as a central defender
- Jochen Klenner (born 1978), German politician
- Jochen Klepper (1903–1942), German writer, poet and journalist
- Jochen Kowalski (born 1954), German alto or mezzo countertenor, noted for his very rich timbre
- Jochen Lempert (born 1958), German photographer whose work is about the world of nature and animals
- Jochen Lettmann (born 1969), German slalom canoeist
- Jochen Liedtke (1953–2001), German computer scientist, noted for his work on microkernels
- Jochen Mass (1946–2025), German racing driver and broadcaster
- Jochen Meißner (born 1943), German rower
- Jochen Miller, trance musician and DJ from Mill, Netherlands
- Jochen Müller (born 1963), German footballer
- Jochen Neerpasch (born 1946), former German racing car driver and motorsports manager
- Jochen Nerpel (born 1983), racing car driver, winner of the German Formula König championship in 2002
- Jochen Piest, correspondent for the German newsmagazine Stern
- Jochen Pietzsch (born 1963), East German luger
- Jochen Reimer (born 1985), Canadian-born German professional ice hockey goaltender
- Jochen Rindt (1942–1970), German racing driver, represented Austria during his career
- Jochen Sachse (born 1948), East German former athlete, competed mainly in the hammer throw
- Jochen Schmid (born 1963), former Grand Prix motorcycle road racer from Germany
- Jochen Schmidt (born 1970), German writer and translator
- Jochen Schmidt (dance critic) (1936–2010), German journalist, critic and book author
- Jochen Schneider (born 1942), West German sprint canoeist
- Jochen Schöps (born 1983), volleyball player from Germany, plays for the Men's National Team
- Jochen Schümann (born 1954), German sailor and Olympic champion
- Jochen Schweizer (born 1957), German stuntman
- Jochen Seitz (born 1976), German footballer
- Jochen Ulrich (1944–2012), German choreographer and dancer
- Jochen Verschl (born 1956), retired West German long jumper
- Hans-Jochen Vogel (1926–2020), politician of the Social Democratic Party of Germany, party leader and minister
- Jochen Zeitz (born 1963), CEO of the Sport & Lifestyle Group of PPR and Executive Chairman of PUMA SE
