= San Joaquin =

San Joaquin may refer to:

== Places ==
=== Central America ===
- San Joaquin, Corozal, a village in Belize
- San Joaquín de Flores, a town in Costa Rica

=== North America ===
==== California, United States ====
- The San Joaquin River
  - The San Joaquin Valley, the southern part of the central valley of California and the valley of the river
  - San Joaquin County, California, named for the river
  - San Joaquin, California, a town in Fresno County, named for the river
  - San Joaquin City, California, in San Joaquin County, a former port on the river
- Rancho San Joaquin, a Mexican land grant in Orange County
  - San Joaquin Hills, in Orange County, named for the rancho

==== Mexico ====
- San Joaquín Municipality, Querétaro, a town
- San Joaquín metro station (Mexico City)

=== South America ===
- San Joaquín, Bolivia, a town
- San Joaquín, Chile, part of the Greater Santiago Metropolitan Region
  - San Joaquín metro station (Santiago)
- San Joaquín, Ecuador, a town
- San Joaquín, Carabobo, a city in Venezuela

=== Other places ===
- San Joaquin (Equatorial Guinea), a volcano in Africa
- San Joaquin, Iloilo, a municipality in the Philippines

== Other uses ==
- Saint Joachim, the father of Mary, mother of Jesus
- San Joaquin (soil), the state soil of California
- San Joaquin kit fox, an endangered subspecies from Central California
- San Joaquin (train), a passenger train service in Central California
- Episcopal Diocese of San Joaquin, a church district in Central California
  - Anglican Diocese of San Joaquin, a breakaway group from that diocese

== See also ==
- Joaquín (given name)
