= Jochem Tanghe =

Belgian footballer

Jochem Tanghe (born 9 May 1987) is a Belgian football goalkeeper who currently plays for Hoogstraten VV.

== Career ==
He made his début in the Jupiler League with Lierse SK in a 0–1 win over Charleroi SC. Tanghe was only 4th keeper at that time, but played due to the Zheyun Ye case and injuries. He left in July 2008 Royal Antwerp F.C. and signed for K. Londerzeel S.K. In 2009-2010 he plays for Hoogstraten VV.
