= Aćim =

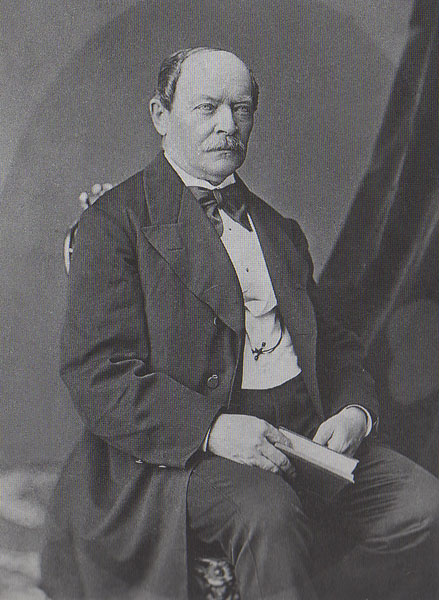
- Serbian physician Aćim Medović
- Gender: male
- Language: Serbian

Origin
- Origin: Hebrew (Biblical)
- Meaning: God erects

Other names
- Variant forms: Aćam, Aća and Aćo
- Related names: Akim (original), Jaćim, Jakim, and their diminutives

Aćim (Serbian: Аћим, romanized: Aćim, lit. 'Joachim') is a Serbian masculine given name, a variant of Akim, adopted from Biblical (Hebrew) name Joachim (Greek: Iōākeím) meaning "God erects". It is attested in Serbian society since the Middle Ages. The patronymic surname Aćimović is derived from the name. It may refer to:

- Aćim Doljanac (fl. 1804–06), Serbian Revolutionary
- Aćim Medović (1815–1893), Serbian physician
- Aćim Čumić (1836–1901), Serbian professor of law, judge, President of Government (1874–75)
- Aćim Babić (1894–1944), Bosnian Serb Chetnik
- Aćim Grulović (1898–1948), Yugoslav Partisan

== Sources ==
- Grković, Milica (1977). Rečnik ličnih imena kod Srba. Belgrade: Vuk Karadžić.
