= Paul Aurelian =

6th-century Welsh bishop of Léon, Brittany

Saint Paul Aurelian
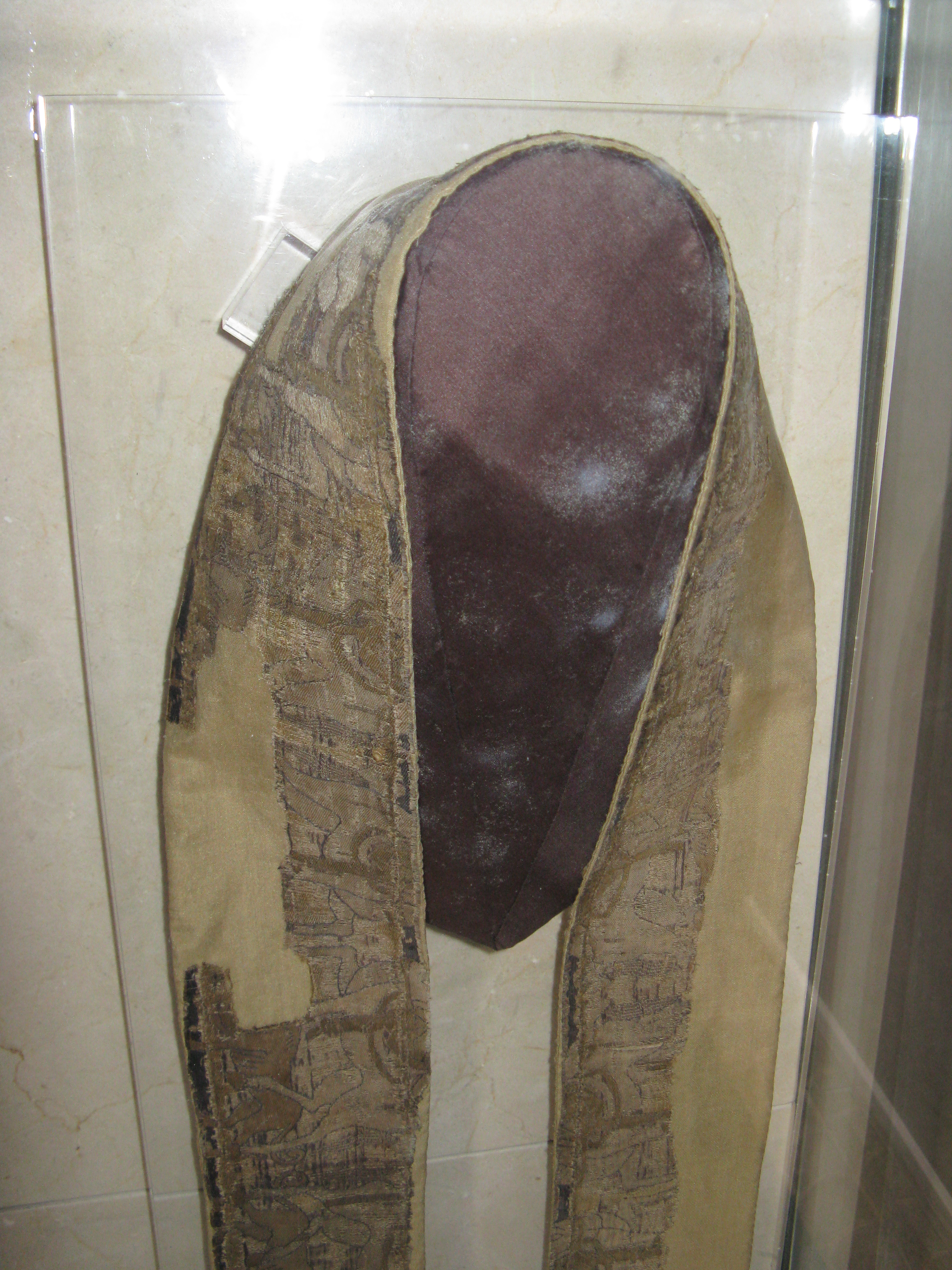
- The stole of Paul Aurelian
- Born: 435 AD; Glamorgan, Wales
- Died: 575 AD (aged 140); Island Batz
- Venerated in: Anglican Communion; Eastern Orthodox Church; Roman Catholic Church
- Major shrine: Fleury
- Feast: 12 March

Paul Aurelian (known in Breton as Paol Aorelian or Saint Pol de Léon and in Latin as Paulinus Aurelianus) was a 6th-century Welshman who became first bishop of the See of Léon and one of the seven founder saints of Brittany. He allegedly died in 575, rumoured to have lived to the age of 140, after having been assisted in his labors by three successive coadjutors. This suggests that several Pauls have been conflated. Gilbert Hunter Doble thought that he might have been Saint Paulinus of Wales.

== Family ==
According to his hagiographic Life, completed in 884 by a Breton monk named Wrmonoc of Landévennec Abbey, Paul was the son of a Welsh chieftain named Perphirius/Porphyrius ("clad in purple"), from Penychen in Glamorgan. He was later given three saintly sister-martyrs; Juthwara, Sidwell and Wulvela.

It was also suggested that he may have been related to Ambrosius Aurelianus, both of them possibly active in Brittany at some points of their lives. Occurring at a time of Saxon raids on the British Isles, it supports the idea of an organized migration of the local Brythonic population under the rules of leaders belonging to the clergy and to the local nobility.

In the Life of Cadoc the princely founder of Llancarfan is reckoned the son of Gwynllyw, eponymous founder of the cantref of Gwynllwg and the son of Glywys. Medieval sources give Gwynllyw a brother, called "Pawl", who is chief of neighbouring Penychen.

== Career ==
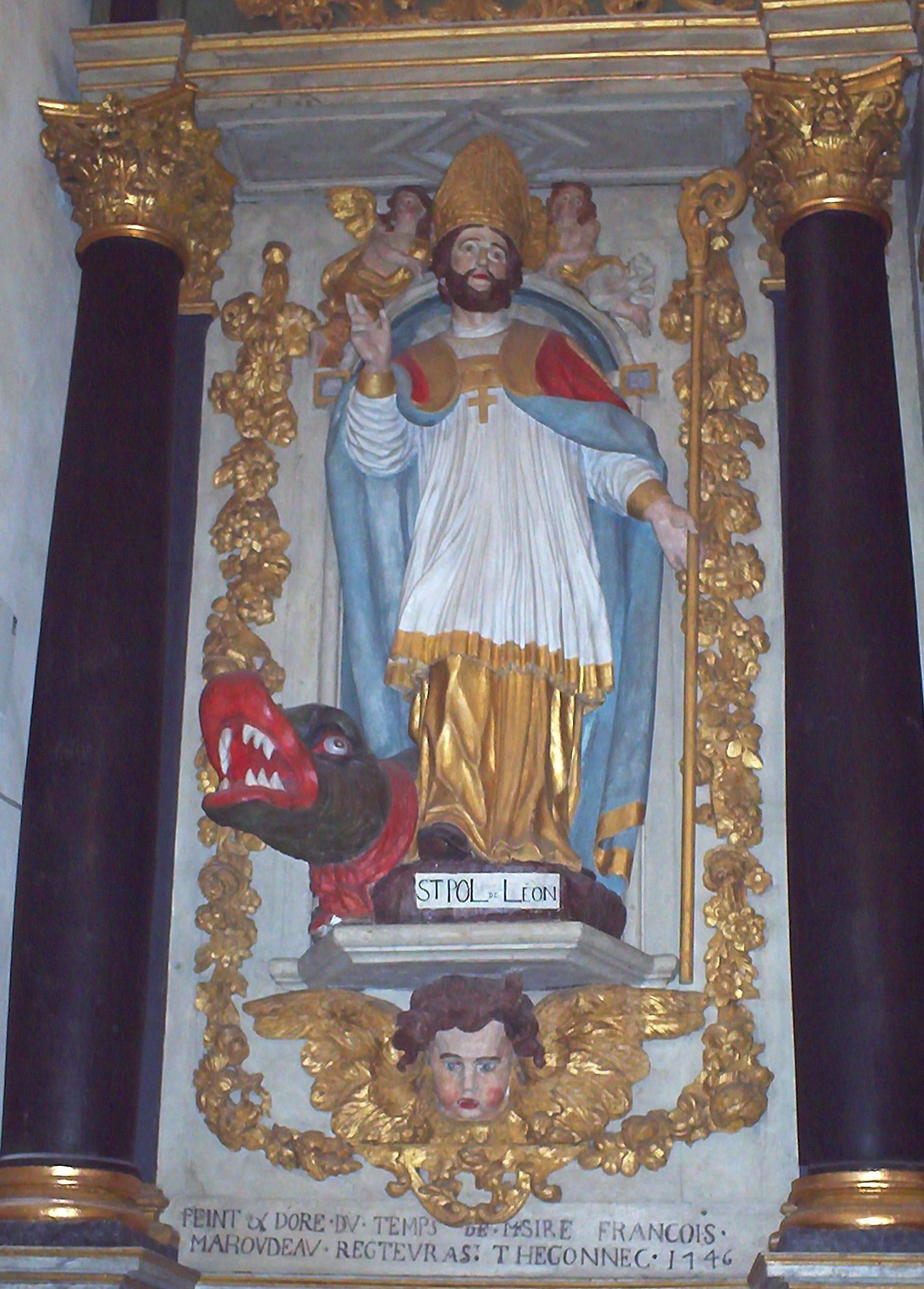
St Pol, as represented in the parish church of Saint-Thégonnec, Brittany.

Paul first was a pupil of Saint Illtud at Llantwit Major. Later, he studied on Caldey Island with Samson of Dol and Gildas.

He went to Brittany, establishing monasteries in Finistère on the northwest coast of Brittany, at Lampaul on the island of Ushant (French Ouessant), on the island of Batz and at Ocsimor, now the city of Saint-Pol-de-Léon, where he is said to have founded a monastery in an abandoned fort. He was consecrated bishop at Ocsimor under the authority of Childebert, King of the Franks.

Paul was a vegetarian. One account says he died on the island of Batz. He was first buried at Saint-Pol-de-Léon, but his relics were later transferred to Fleury Abbey.

He was succeeded as bishop by his companion, Saint Joavan. Paul's bell is kept at Saint-Pol. His feast day is 12 March.

== Paulinus of Wales ==
G. H. Doble thought Saint Paul Aurelian might be the same as Saint Paulinus of Wales, revered in Carmarthenshire, southwest Wales as a hermit and teacher at a place usually identified as Whitland. Hywel David Emanuel considered the identification of Paul Aurelian with the Carmarthenshire Paulinus as doubtful.

In Rhigyfarch's Life of S. David (chapter x), Saint David is stated to have completed his education under S. Paulinus (Paulens), who is described as a "scribe, a disciple of S. Germanus the bishop". When Paulinus became blind, David is said to have miraculously restored his sight.

Paulinus of Wales founded churches and chapels around Llandovery. He is said to have taught Saint Teilo and to have nominated David to speak at the Synod of Llanddewi Brefi (in around 545). Claims of having founded the church at Paul are dubious.

A 6th century inscribed stone found at Caeo in Carmarthenshire, now in the Carmarthen Museum, appears to honour him as "preserver of the faith, constant lover of his country, champion of righteousness". His feast day is 23 November.

== See also ==
- Early Middle Ages

== Sources ==
- Gilbert Hunter Doble (1971). Lives of the Welsh Saints.
- Gilbert Hunter Doble (1960) The Saints of Cornwall: part 1. Truro, UK: Dean and Chapter; pp. 10–60
