= Ferenc Joachim =

Hungarian painter (1882–1964)

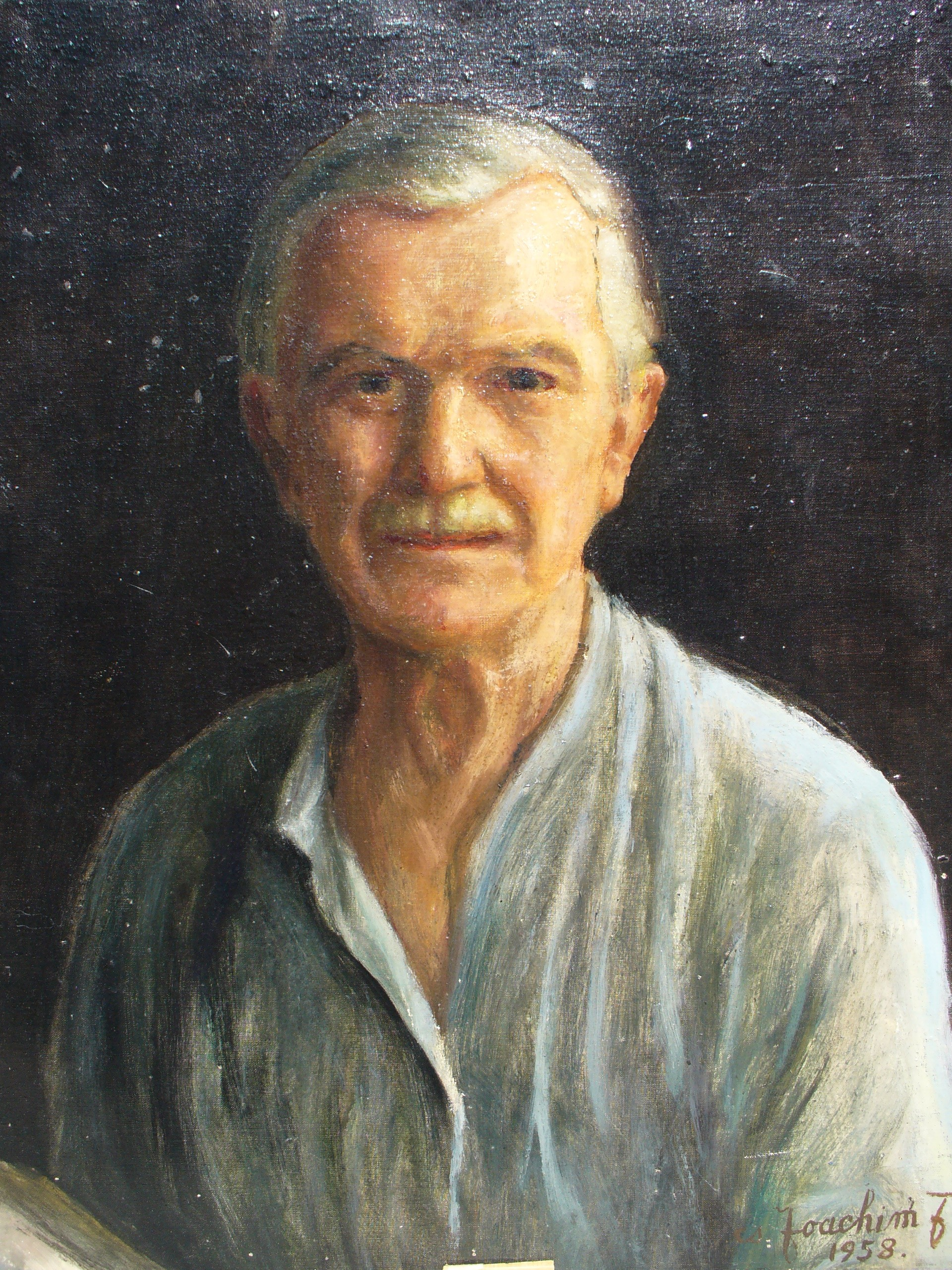
- Ferenc Joachim, self portrait, oil on canvas, 49 cm x 63 cm, 1958, Budapest, Hungary.
- Born: 21 May 1882; Szeged, Austria-Hungary
- Died: 16 September 1964 (aged 82); Gyula, People's Republic of Hungary
- Education: Budapest, Vienna, Munich and Paris
- Known for: Painting
- Movement: Impressionism

Ferenc Joachim (21 May 1882 – 16 September 1964) was a Hungarian painter of portraits and landscapes in oil, watercolors and pastels on canvas, board and paper. He studied and painted in Budapest and Western Europe. As an untitled member of the minor nobility, Joachim was entitled to bear the honorary prefix Csejtei, so prior to the Communist abolition of honorifics in 1947 his name might be found in the form "Csejtei Joachim Ferenc" (or "Cs. Joachim F.") in Hungarian, or in German "Franz Joachim von Csejthey".

== Early life ==
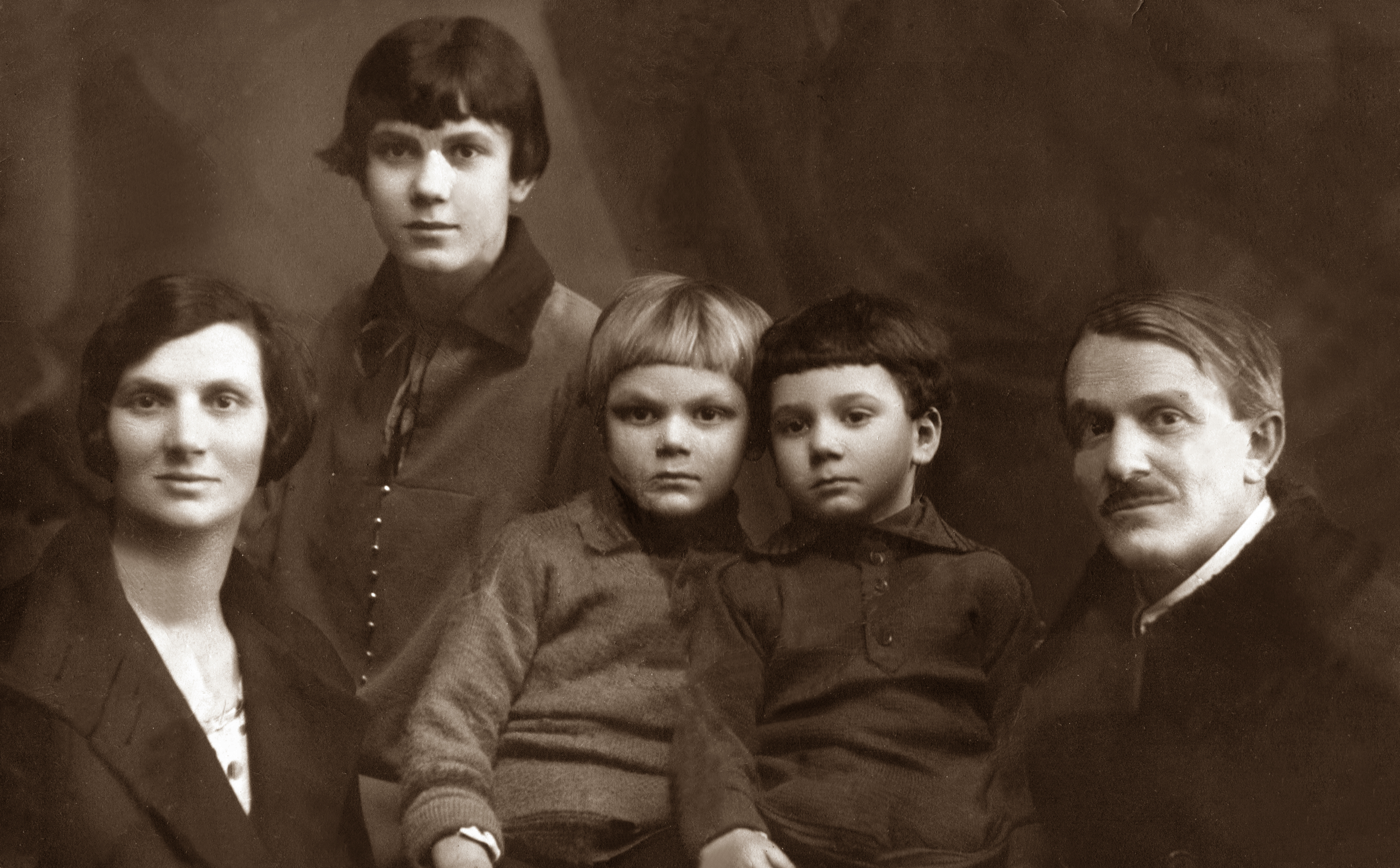
Ferenc Joachim and his wife Margit with their three children. Szeged, Hungary, 1925.

Joachim's parents were Ferenc Joachim and Emilia Metz of Szeged, Hungary. He had two brothers, Jozsef and Károly, and four sisters, Gizella, Mariska, Jolán, and Mici. The family was Roman Catholic. Some of his siblings were also artists in their own right: Jozsef was a sculptor and painter while Gizella became a stage actress.

Ferenc Joachim was born in Szeged, in what was at that time the Austro-Hungarian Empire. For the first 36 years of his life he lived and worked in Hungary and in various parts of Western Europe.

Little is known about the first 30 years of Joachim's life. It appears that Joachim was married twice. He married Margit Gráf (1892–1965) around 1912. They had three children: one daughter, Piroska (1913–2007), and two sons, Ferenc Gabriel (1920–1989) and Attila (1923–1947).

Joachim studied painting in Budapest (Hungary), Vienna (Austria), Munich (Germany), and Paris (France). He studied with Hungarian art educator Simon Hollósy at his private school in Munich, and periodically visited Hollósy's Nagybánya artists' colony in Transylvania.

== Painting career ==
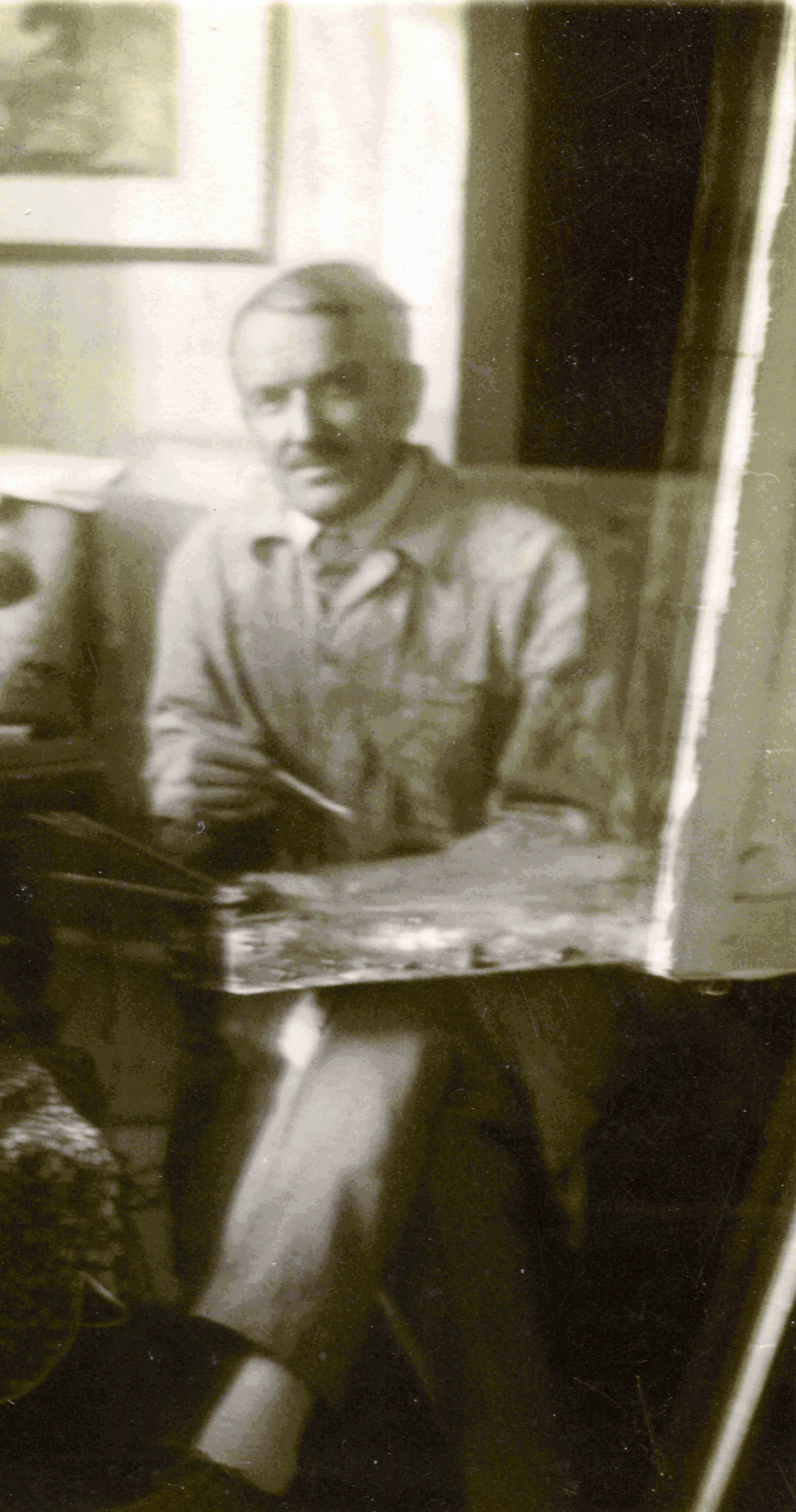
Joachim circa 1929, in Szeged, Hungary.

While his principal residences and studios were in his birthplace of Szeged and in Budapest, Joachim also painted in Rome, Venice, Marseille, and the south of France. During his time in France he went by the name François Joachim. His works were exhibited in Paris, Rome, Venice, Berlin and Munich.

Joachim was a proponent of the late 19th-century concept of leaving the studio and painting in nature. One of his most productive periods was during one of his stays in Marseille and along the Mediterranean coast, where he painted over a hundred canvases.

In Szeged he was active in promoting the arts in the region. Articles from Művészet in both 1910 and 1913 show him with other local artists. A publication from Hódmezővásárhely dated 15 April 1910 reports the annual spring exhibition of artists in Szeged, with Joachim Ferenc cited as the most modern of them, with a first-class sensibility for colors. Joachim's paintings were exhibited at the Salon d'Automne (1911) and Salon des Indépendants (1913) in Paris, and at the Nemzeti Szalon (National Salon) in Budapest. His paintings were also exhibited at the Szépműveszeti Múzeum or Museum of Fine Arts (Budapest).

An article documents that in April 1919 Joachim was a member of the committee of the Szeged Museum trying to save and catalogue the museum's collections following the ravages and chaos of World War I (during which Joachim had served in the Kaiserlich und königlich forces of the Austro-Hungarian Army). Another document, dated 15 January 1928, shows Ferenc Joachim to be a founding member of the "Alföld Artists Association" ("Alföldi Müvészek Egyesülete") in Szeged.

Today a small collection of his paintings (partly owned and partly on loan) is preserved in the repository of the "Móra Ferenc Múzeum" in Szeged. One painting, "Kőbánya Albániában" (Stone Quarry in Albania), is owned by the Hungarian National Gallery. All other paintings are in private hands, occasionally appearing at public art auctions in Hungary and the US.

== Family difficulties ==
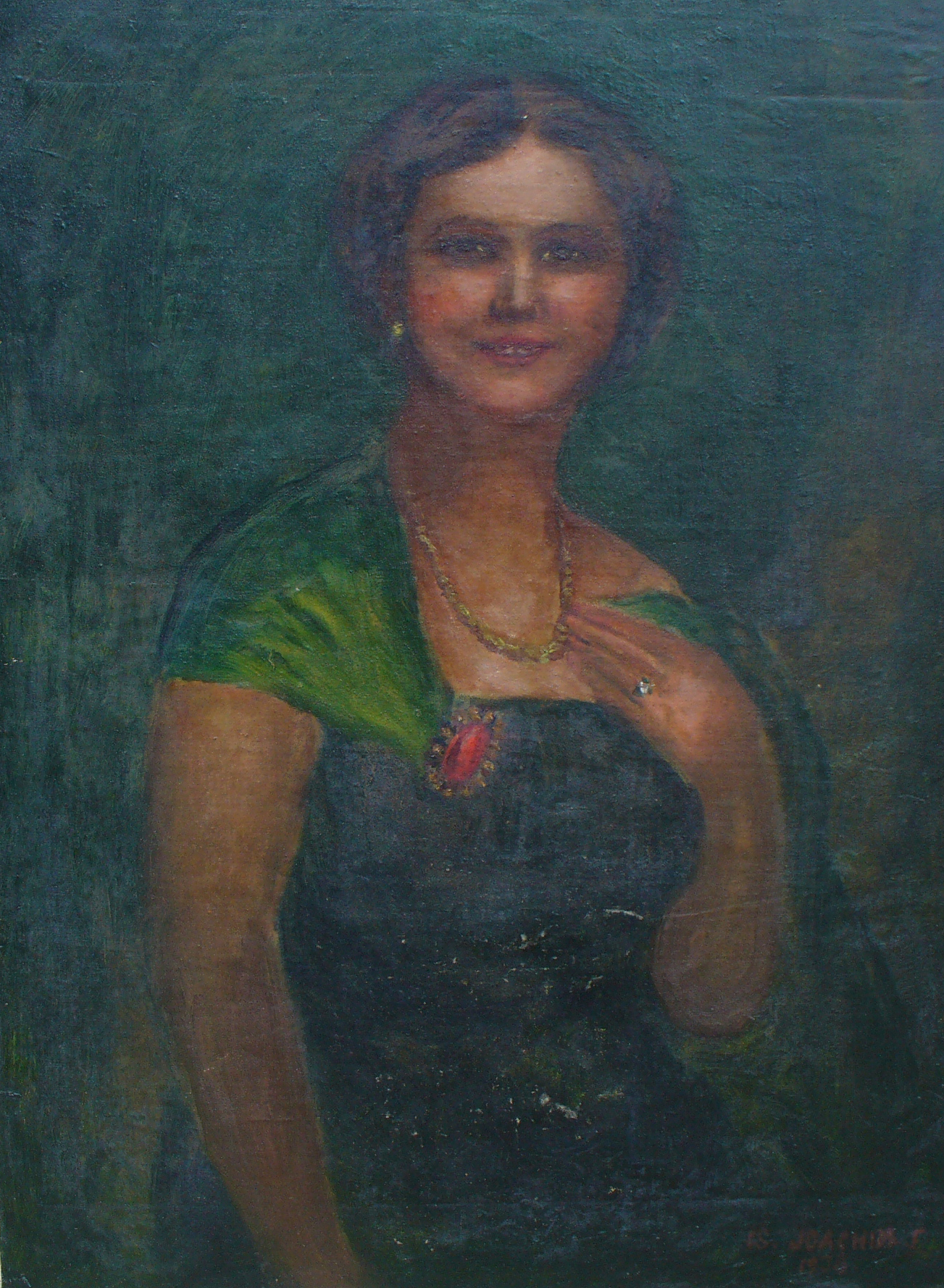
Portrait of Julia Graf. Oil on canvas, 60 cm x 80 cm, 1938.

During the years of the Great Depression the family was reduced to poverty; in an interview in 1935 Joachim attributed his daughter's attempted suicide to their financial straits.

During the Second World War a number of Joachim's relatives and in-laws were persecuted or murdered. Both of his sisters-in-law (one of whom, Julia Gráf, had sat for a portrait with him in 1938), their husbands and children died in the Budapest holocaust, while the fate of his three brothers-in-law is unknown. Joachim's younger son, Attila, enrolled as a student at the Hungarian Academy of Fine Arts in 1941, and graduated in 1946. His early death, the year after his graduation, was attributed to complications arising from internal injuries received from beatings by Hungarian Fascists and German Nazis, during the Budapest holocaust.

== Later life ==
The final 20 years of Joachim's life, from 1944 to 1964, were spent in Communist Hungary. His two surviving children, Piroska and Ferenc Gabriel, fled the country after the Hungarian Revolution of 1956, and found refuge in Canada, both later moving to the United States. Ferenc Gabriel, under the name Frank G. Joachim, became a research biologist and entomologist with the United States Department of Agriculture (USDA) Metabolism and Radiation Laboratory.

In their old age, Joachim and his wife were moved to separate old age homes: Joachim went to Gyula, where he died and was buried on 16 September 1964, at age 82; Margit went to Szentgotthárd, where she died and was buried at age 73 in 1965.
