= Patriarch Joachim =

Patriarch Joachim may refer to:

- Patriarch Joachim I of Bulgaria (r. 1234–1246)
- Patriarch Joachim I of Constantinople (r. 1498–1502 and 1504)
- Patriarch Joachim of Alexandria (r. 1486–1567, traditional dates)
- Patriarch Joachim of Moscow and All Russia (r. 1674–1690)
- Patriarch Joachim II of Constantinople (r. 1860–1863 and 1873–1878)
- Patriarch Joachim III of Constantinople (r. 1878–1884 and 1901–1912)
- Patriarch Joachim IV of Constantinople (r. 1884–1887)
