= Joaquín Barañao =

Chilean writer (born 1982)

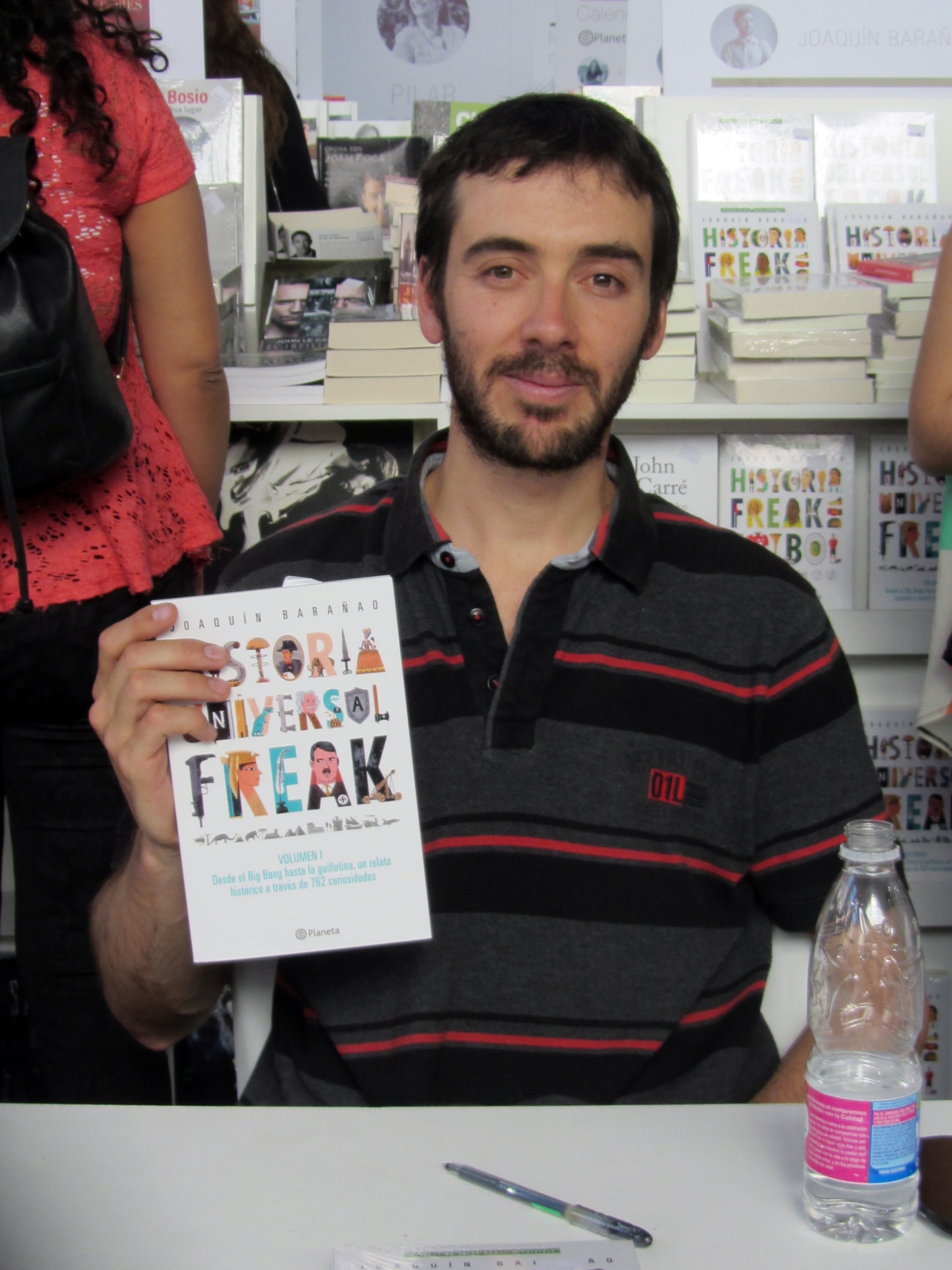
- Barañao at FILSA 2016
- Born: José Joaquín Barañao Díaz; 6 January 1982 (age 44); Santiago, Chile
- Occupation: Writer
- Writing career
- Language: Spanish
- Genre: Non-fiction
- Notable awards: 2017 - Best book by the Instituto de Historia y Estadística del Fútbol Chileno

Joaquín Barañao Díaz (Santiago, Chile, January 6, 1982) is a Chilean writer and podcaster, who specialized in books and podcasts about history. Specifically on freak fun facts about different topics.

== Biography ==
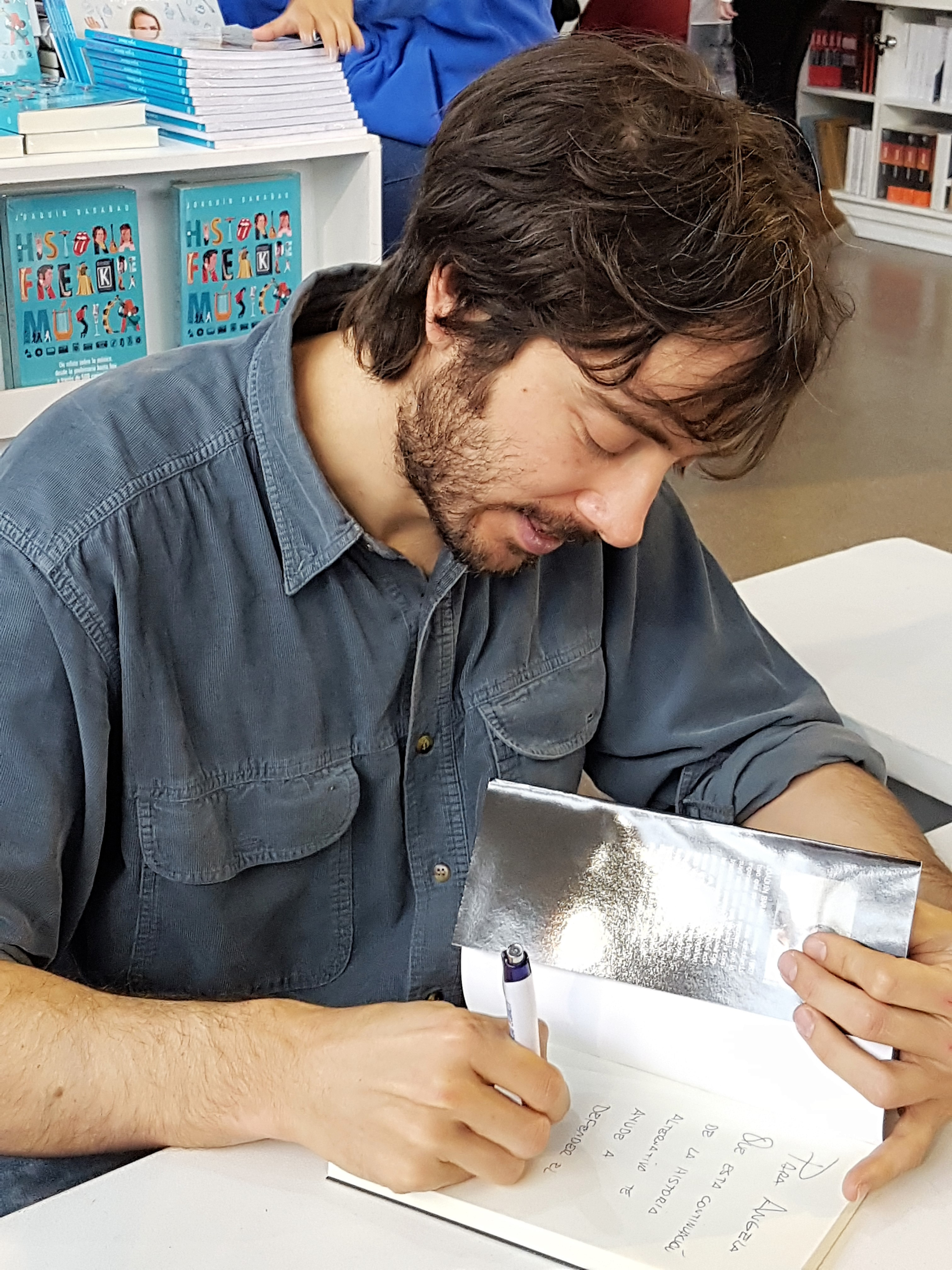
Barañao at a signing session

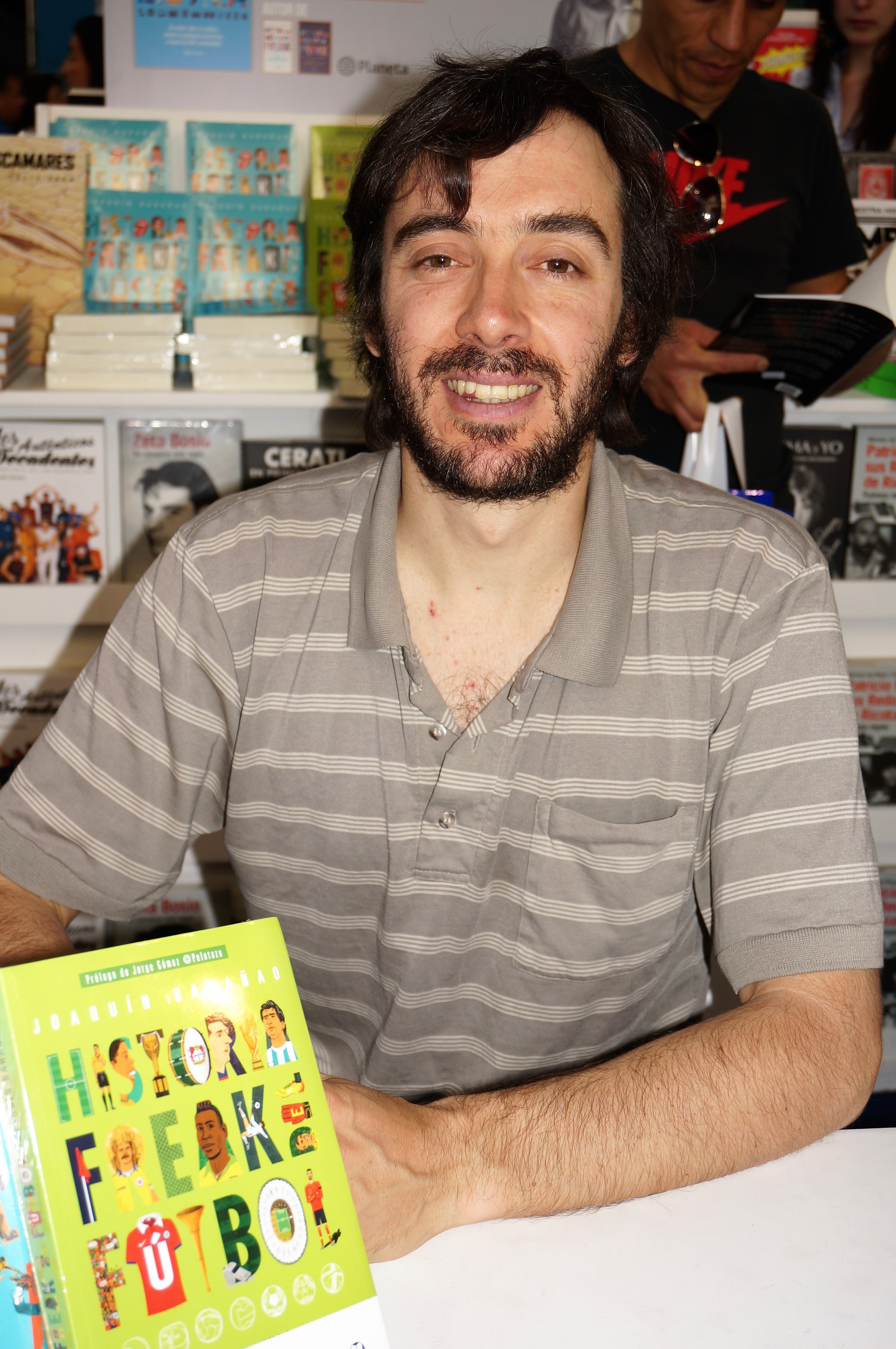
Barañao at the FILSA 2017.

Barañao attended to Colegio San Ignacio El Bosque (1987–1999) and then civil engineering at Pontificia Universidad Católica de Chile (2000-2006), where he got a degree in hydraulic engineering.

== Career ==
His first job was as an advisor to Andrés Allamand, then senator of the XVI district (2006–2010). Then worked in the government of Sebastián Piñera, first in the President's cabinet and later in the cabinet of the undersecretary of the interior, Rodrigo Ubilla, coordinating the reform of the migratory legislation (2011–2014). He has provided advice on matters related to the Chile/Argentina 2030 Strategic Forum project.

== Writer ==
His first book started to take form in 2003, when he began compiling anecdotes and curious facts in a website. Only eleven years later, in December 2014, he published his first book on Amazon.com Historia universal freak (A Freak World History), which a year later was released in paperback by Planeta Group. The book narrates the history from the Big Bang to the present, through curious facts. The first volume remained 20 weeks in the El Mercurio non fiction bestselling list . A second volume of the work, was published in December 2016 and remained in the aforementioned list for seven weeks.

Historia freak del fútbol (A Freak History of Soccer) was released in May 2016, and appeared three weeks in the same ranking. In June 2017, that book was rewarded by the Instituto de Historia y Estadística del Fútbol Chileno as the best soccer book of the year.

In July 2017 was released Historia freak de la música (A Freak History of Music), point at which Barañao declared that his next projects were a book about the history of film for 2018, and then another one about the history of Chile. Historia Freak de la Música was in the bestselling list for two weeks.

=== Style ===
Barañao concentrates long periods of time in middle-sized books, originating text of very high density of information and numerous curiosities, each of which is contains a bibliographic reference. The general tone is playful, ironic and irreverent, with continuous references to humour and sarcasm Barañao acknowledges in his work the influence of the writer Bill Bryson.

I would never call myself an historian. There is a clear difference between them and me. They are those who push the historic knowledge forward, reveal new information through their research, search for sources, etc. Neither I have done that nor I pretend to do it. What I do make is, as Newton would say, stand on the shoulders of giants and reprocess what historians have found out. In that sense, it is not a pretentious activity. But I believe that there is value in writing historic facts in an attractive manner and with a humorous touch.

== Bibliography ==
- Historia universal freak, volume 1, Planeta Group, 2015; ISBN 9789563600544
- Historia universal freak, volume 2, Planeta, 2016; ISBN 9789504956501
- Historia freak del fútbol, Planeta, 2016; ISBN 9789563601138
- Historia freak de la música, Planeta, 2017; ISBN 9789563603033
- Historia freak del cine, volume 1, Planeta, 2018; ISBN 9789563605150
- Historia freak del cine, volume 2, Planeta, 2018; ISBN 9789563605167
- Historia freak de Chile, volume 1, Planeta, 2019; ISBN 9789563606355
- Historia freak de Chile, volume 2, Planeta, 2020; ISBN 9789563607383
- ¿Qué nos pasó Chile?; Ed. Trayecto, 2020 ISBN 9789569641572
- Dinología Freak; Planeta, 2021; ISBN 9789569992759
- Historia Freak de la Segunda Guerra Mundial', Planeta, 2026; ISBN 9789564089867
