= Joaquim =

- Pronunciation: Portuguese: [ʒuaˈkĩ, ʒuɐˈkĩ, ʒoaˈkĩ] Catalan: [ʒuəˈkim, (d)ʒuaˈkim]
- Gender: male

Origin
- Origin: Hebrew
- Region of origin: Portugal

Other names
- Related names: Joachim, Joaquín

Joaquim is the Portuguese and Catalan version of Joachim.

== Given name ==
- Joaquim Agostinho (1943–1984), Portuguese professional bicycle racer
- Joaquim de Almeida (born 1957), Portuguese actor
- Joaquim Amat-Piniella (1913–1974), Catalan writer and politician
- Joaquim António de Aguiar (1792–1884), Portuguese politician
- Joaquim Antonio (Callado) da Silva (1848–1880), Brazilian composer and flutist
- Joaquim Arcoverde de Albuquerque Cavalcanti (1850–1930), first Cardinal to be born in Latin America
- Joaquim Augusto Mouzinho de Albuquerque (1855–1902), Portuguese soldier
- Joaquim Benedito Barbosa Gomes (born 1954), first black Supreme Federal Tribunal justice in Brazil
- Joaquim Carvalho (1937–2022), Portuguese football goalkeeper
- Joaquim Chissano (born 1939), President of Mozambique
- Joaquim Conceição (1942–2020), Portuguese footballer
- Joaquim Coulanges (born 2006), Canadian soccer player
- Joaquim Cruz (born 1963), former Brazilian athlete
- Joaquim Ferraz (born 1974), Portuguese footballer
- Joaquim Floriano de Godoy (1826–1907), Brazilian doctor and politician
- Joaquim Goes, Indian scientist
- Joaquim Gomes (born 1980), Angolan professional basketball player
- Joaquim Gomes (cyclist) (born 1965), Portuguese road bicycle racer
- Joaquim Guedes (1932–2008), Brazilian architect
- Joaquim Henrique (born 1998), Brazilian football defender
- Joaquim José Antunes (1731–1811), Portuguese harpsichord maker
- Joaquim Leitão (born 1956), Portuguese film director
- Joaquim Machado de Castro (1731–1822), one of Portugal's foremost sculptors
- Joaquim de Magalhães Fernandes Barreiros (Quim Barreiros) (born 1947), Portuguese musician
- Joaquim Magalhães Mota (1935–2007), Portuguese politician
- Joaquim Manuel de Macedo (1820–1882), Brazilian author
- Joaquim Maria Machado de Assis (1839–1908), Brazilian realist novelist, poet and short-story writer
- Joaquim Miranda (1950–2006), Portuguese economist and politician
- Joaquim Nabuco (1849–1910), Brazilian writer and statesman
- Joaquim Nadal (born 1948), spokesperson of the Catalan Government
- Joaquim Pedro de Andrade (1932–1988), Brazilian film director and screenwriter
- Joaquim Pedro de Oliveira Martins (1845–1894), Portuguese writer
- Joaquim Pimenta de Castro (1846–1918), Portuguese military officer and politician
- Joaquim Pinheiro (born 1960), retired Portuguese runner
- Joaquim Pires Ferreira (born 1761), Brazilian merchant who acted in the Pernambucan revolt
- Joaquim Rafael Branco (born 1953), São Toméan politician
- Joaquim Rodríguez (born 1979), Spanish Cyclist
- Joaquim Santana (1936–1989), Portuguese footballer
- Joaquim Sapinho (born 1965), Portuguese film director
- Joaquim Silva (athlete) (born 1961), Portuguese long-distance runner
- Joaquim Videira (born 1984), Portuguese épée fencer

== Surname ==
- Agnes Joaquim (born Ashkhen Hovakimian, 1854–1899), Singaporean Armenian who bred Singapore's first hybridised orchid hybrid, Vanda 'Miss Joaquim'
- Alberto Joaquim Chipande (born 1939), politician
- Eduardo Joaquim Mulémbwè, politician
- José Joaquim da Cunha de Azeredo Coutinho (1742–1821), a Brazilian-born Portuguese bishop and inquisitor-general
- Marcos Joaquim dos Santos (born 1975), Brazilian central defender
- Tobias Joaquim Dai (born 1950), Minister of National Defence of Mozambique
- Vasco Joaquim Rocha Vieira (1939–2025), Portuguese administrator and army officer

== See also ==
- Joaquim (film), a 2017 Brazilian film
