= Prince Joachim =

Prince Joachim may refer to:

- Prince Joachim of Denmark (born 1969)
- Prince Joachim of Prussia (1890–1920)
- Prince Joachim of Belgium, Archduke of Austria-Este (born 1991)
- Prince Joachim Albert of Prussia (1876–1939), House of Hohenzollern
