= Joachim of Ithaca =

Saint Joachim of Ithaca

Papoulakis
- Born: 1786; Ithaca, Republic of Venice
- Died: 1868; Ithaca, Greece
- Venerated in: Eastern Orthodox Church
- Canonized: 1998 by Ecumenical Patriarchate
- Major shrine: Church of Agia Varvara, Ithaca, Greece
- Feast: 2 March
- Patronage: patron of Ithaca, Greece

Saint Joachim of Ithaca (Greek: Άγιος Ιωακείμ εξ Ιθάκης) also known as Saint Joachim of Vatopaedi or Saint Papoulakis was born in 1786 as Ioannis Patrikios near Polyktoria, a region in the island of Ithaca, Greece, where his father, Angelos Patrikios, was based as a Captain. Agne, his mother, was a devout Orthodox Christian but she died when he was still a child. From her Joachim learned the daily prayers and the importance of regular church attendance.

Angelos married to another woman after Agne died. She detested Joachim and was particularly irritated by the hours he spent in church every day and the vigils that he kept. She made his life a misery and finally persuaded Angelos that he be sent away to learn a trade. From that time on, Joachim made a living helping the sailors on the ships. He traveled across the Mediterranean but was not interested in anything other than the churches and shrines of the ports that he visited.

At the age of 17 he found himself on a ship bound for Athos. On arrival there Joachim took the opportunity to visit and speak to the Abbot of the Monastery of Vatopaedi. The latter was impressed by the young sailor and, after long discussions, agreed that he could stay on as a novice. Giorgis, the Captain of the ship, did not like the idea of losing one of his crew but Joachim assured him that this was what he had always wanted. Captain Giorgis finally agreed to speak to Joachim's father about the matter and left.

The hard working and ascetic young novice had few difficulties in adapting to the monastic life and was soon made steward of Vatopaedi. In later years, Joachim was sent to preach around Greece and he came to be considered one of the most notable elders of Vatopaedi. His mission, particularly to the Peloponnese, was comparable in scope to the work of Cosmas of Aetolia in Northern Greece. Known as "Papoulakis" (an affectionate term literally meaning 'little father'), Joachim re-founded monasteries, helped organize schools and distributed Bibles.

During the Greek War of Independence Joachim devoted himself to raising funds for the refugees and traveled around the liberated areas to preach and raise the morale of the beleaguered Greeks. Joachim had earlier founded a monastery at Tripotamos of Elia, with the outbreak of hostilities this became the supply center for the free lands and as such was often the target of Turkish raids. Joachim repeatedly supervised the defense of the monastery but it was finally sacked by Ibrahim Pasha, the leader of the Egyptian troops until 1825. All those who had resisted were massacred or sent as slaves to Egypt but Joachim and a famed eldress were taken prisoner.

Both Joachim and the nun were publicly invited by Ibrahim to become Muslims. The Egyptians believed that they had led the resistance and realized that their apostasy would dishearten the Greek fighters. When they refused they were beaten and then subjected to various tortures. The elderly nun was actually tortured to death but Joachim exhausted the prison guards, he with-stood the most refined torments that they could think up. This was reported to Ibrahim who decided that the monk was obviously a holy man and should be set free.

Undaunted, Joachim gave himself no time to recover from his experiences in the Ottoman prisons. He returned to the mountain strongholds and the refuges where countless women, children and old people were in hiding. He urged them to keep the faith and prophesied better times to come. Joachim helped many families escape to the Ionian Islands and found shelter for them with Christian families there. He worked as a Captain ferrying refugees from Greece to the islands and supplies back to the fighters. One night he managed to rescue a group of women and children the very moment the Turks had surrounded them, miraculously they all escaped unscathed.

After the Greeks had secured the Peloponnese, Joachim retired to Ithaca. He was unwell and sick of the horrors of war. For 5 years he lived as a hermit in the forest of Afentikos Loggos. Later he began to receive visitors, to give advice and to organize relief for the poor. At one point he was summoned to see the British Governor of the island and accused of sedition. The authorities first threatened to expel the hermit but the Governor was impressed by Joachim and gave him permission to preach wherever he pleased. Joachim then moved to St. Nikolaos Mavronas Monastery, from there he toured the island and spoke to the multitudes that gathered around him. He founded many churches and a monastery dedicated to St. Barbara at Stavros.

Many miracles were attributed to Joachim; he is believed to have healed the sick and to have accurately foretold future events. In his "Life" it is recorded that his prayers ended epidemics and kept away locusts, that he predicted storms at sea and warned the seafarers when to stay in the port of Vathy. On one occasion he had taken the place of a poor farmer reduced to servitude. Apparently the farmer had no money to pay a doctor; the latter treated him anyway and then insisted that the man work off his debt. In spite of having to return to Vatopaedi, Joachim had served the doctor's family until they relented and escorted him back to Mount Athos.

Joachim died peacefully while staying at Vathy in 1867. No money was found in his possession; he had only an old cassock and held a note requesting that he be buried at St. Barbara Monastery. Great crowds followed his relics about the island and then to the monastery, the abbot of St. Barbara postponed the funeral in an attempt to disperse these. It is claimed that many miracles took place at this time and at the tomb of the Saint ever since.

St. Joachim of Ithaca is commemorated on March 2, the day of his repose, while the restitution of his relics is observed on May 23. Long revered as a Saint, he was formally canonized in March 1998. With St. Raphael of Therme (d. 1463, also from Ithaca) he is held to be the patron of the island.

== Sources ==
- Biography of St. Joachim of Ithaca
- "Papoulakis", book written by elder Joseph of Vatopedi monastery, Athos (1992).
- "St. Joachim the Ithacan", book written by K. Kanellos, Ithaca (2000).
