= San Joaquín Municipality, Beni =

Coordinates: 13°00′S 64°50′W

San Joaquín Municipality (Bolivia)
- Municipality
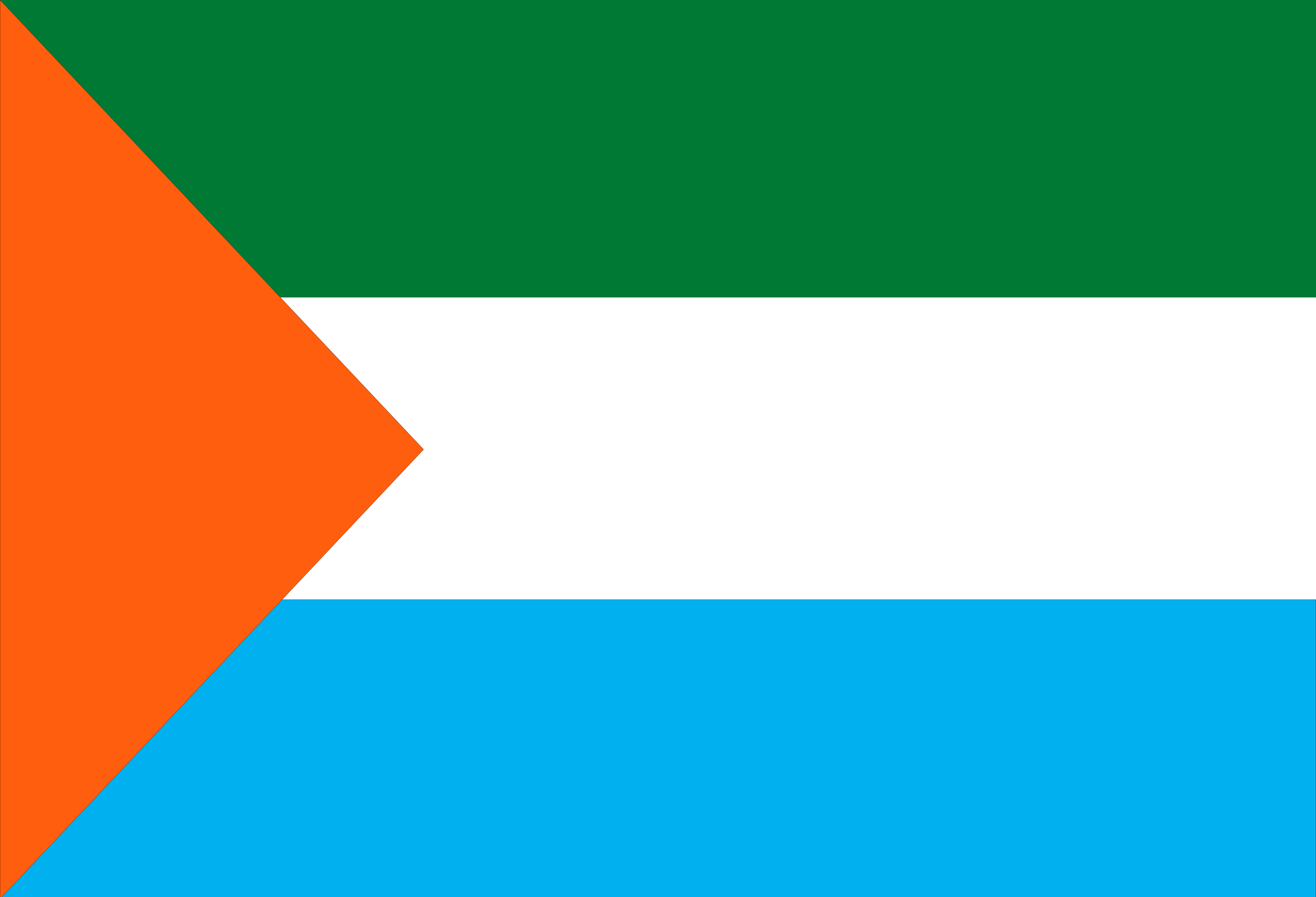
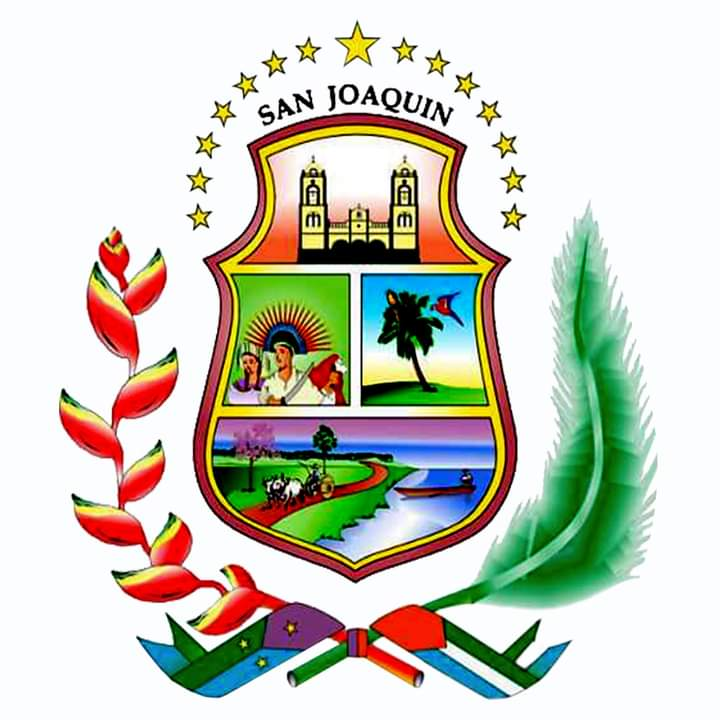
- Flag Coat of arms
- Interactive map of San Joaquín Municipality (Bolivia)
- Country: Bolivia
- Department: Beni Department
- Time zone: UTC-4 (BOT)

San Joaquín Municipality is a municipality of the Beni Department, Bolivia.
