= Joavan =

Saint Joavan Bishop of Léon
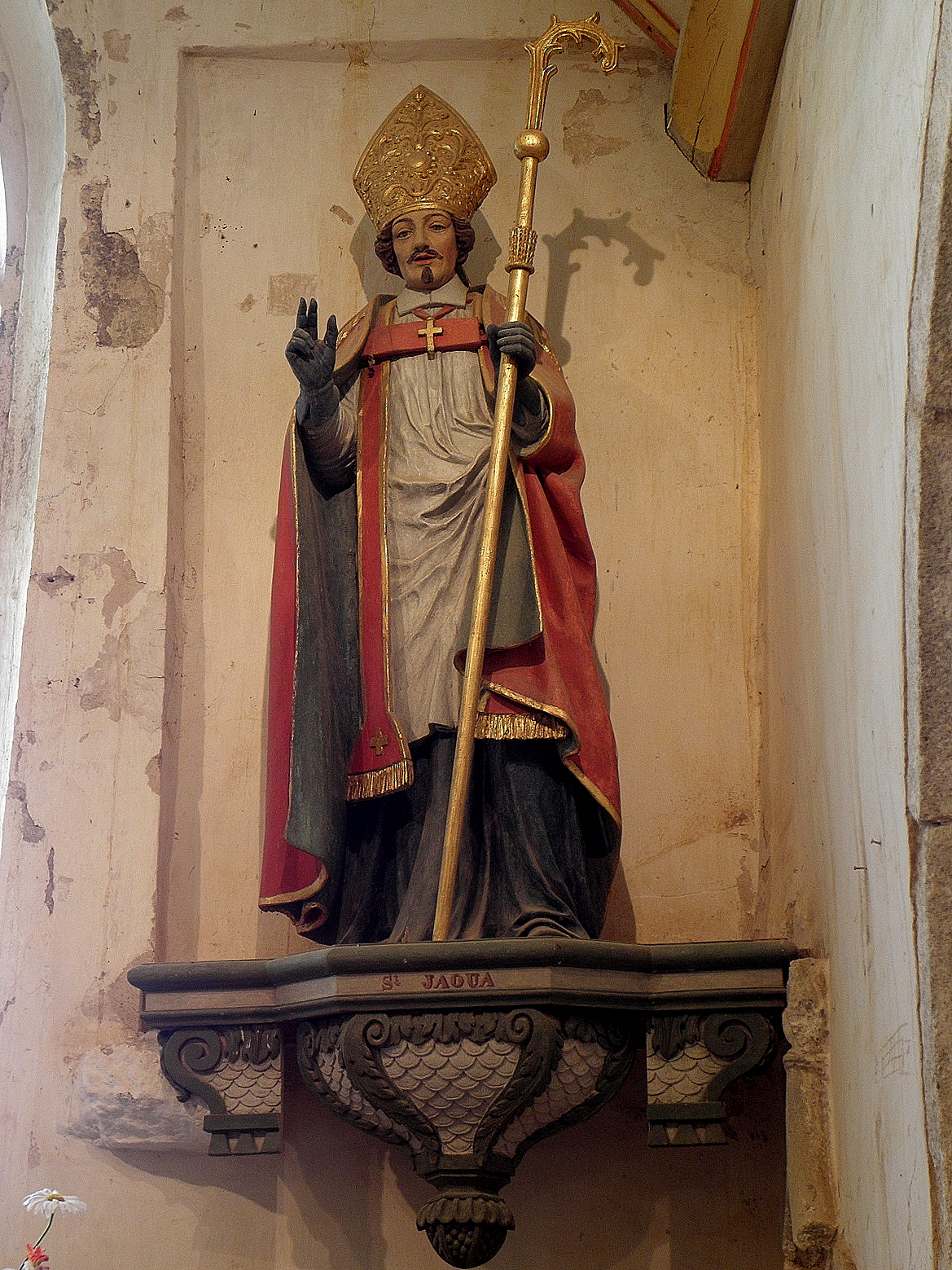
- Statue at the Saint-Jaoua Chapel in Plouvien.
- Born: c. 500 AD; Ireland
- Died: c. 555 AD (aged 55); Plouvien, Brittany
- Feast: 2 March

Saint Joavan (or Jaoua, Joévin, Jouva, Jaouen, Yaouen; born c. 500 - died c. 555) was an Irish priest and bishop in Brittany.

== Monks of Ramsgate account ==
The Monks of Ramsgate wrote in their Book of Saints (1921),

JOAVAN (St.) Bp. (March 2)
(6th cent.) Said to have been a native of Ireland, educated in Britain, and a companion of St. Paul de Leon in Armorica, where he became that Saint's successor as Bishop. He passed away about A.D. 562. His tomb is still in great veneration and his Festival is kept liturgically in Brittany.

== Baring-Gould's account ==
Sabine Baring-Gould (1834–1924) in his Lives Of The Saints wrote under March 2,

S. JOAVAN, P.C.
(6TH CENT.)
[Venerated In Brittany. Authorities :—A Life by Albert Le Grand. and the lections of the Church of S. Paul de Leon. Albert Le Grand wrote his lie in 1623, from old MSS. bistories and legends preserved at Leon in his time] THIS saint was an Irishman by birth, and nephew of S. Paul of Léon. He studied with his uncle in Britain, and then returned to Ireland, but hearing that S. Paul had gone into Brittany, he departed for that country, and after having passed his noviciate in the monastery of Lianaterenecan, under S. Judulus, he departed to Léon, and received priest's orders from his uncle, who appointed him to the isle of Baz. He is patron of two parishes in the diocese of S. Paul de Léon.

== Butler's account ==
The hagiographer Alban Butler (1710–1773) wrote in his Lives of the Fathers, Martyrs, and Other Principal Saints under March 2,

Saint Joavan, or Joevin, B. C. This saint was a fervent disciple of Saint Paul of Leon, in Great Britain, his own country, accompanied him into Armorica, led an anchoretical life near him in the country of Ack, and afterwards in the isle of Baz. That great saint chose him coadjutor in his bishopric, when he retired a little before his death. Saint Joavan survived him only one year. He is titular saint of two parish churches in the diocess of Saint Paul of Leon, etc. See Lobineau, Vies des Saints de la Bretagne, from the breviary and tradition of that church, though the life of Saint Jovian, copied by Albert the Great, etc. deserves no regard.

== John O'Hanlon's account ==
John O'Hanlon (1821–1905) wrote on what had been recorded on Joava's life in his Lives of the Irish Saints (1875). In summary, Saint Ioava or Joava, Iovinus or Joevinus was Irish by birth. His mother was the sister of Saint Paul Aurelion. He spent some time in Wales, where he studied under Saint Paul, then returned to Ireland. Saint Paul left Wales for France and was consecrated first Bishop of Léon in Brittany. When Ioava heard of this he left Ireland secretly (his parents wanted him to marry) and landed near Llandevenec, where Saint Winwaloe had founded a monastery. He met the abbot Judulus, and went with him to his monastery of Llanaterenecan where he became a monk. He learned quickly, and Judulus soon appointed him priest of the parish of Barspars.

At this time many of the people and nobility were pagan, and at one gathering where Joava and Judulus were present a noble named Toparsh of Le Fou attacked and killed Judulus, although Ioava escaped back to Barsparz. He met his uncle Paul and went with him to Le Fou, where through preaching and miracles the population was converted to Christianity. They founded a monastery at Le Fou and Joava was made the first abbot. He later became the assistant of Saint Paul, who was now Bishop of Léon, and assumed all administrative functions. After Paul retired, Joava became bishop, but only ruled for just over a year before dying in 554 or 555.

== Sources ==
- Baring-Gould, Sabine (1897), The Lives Of The Saints, vol. 3, March, London: John C. Nimmo This article incorporates text from this source, which is in the public domain.
- Butler, Alban (1798), The Lives of the Primitive Fathers, Martyrs, and Other Principal Saints, vol. 2, J. Moir This article incorporates text from this source, which is in the public domain.
- O'Hanlon, John (1875), Lives of the Irish Saints : with special festivals, and the commemorations of holy persons, Dublin: J. Duffy This article incorporates text from this source, which is in the public domain.
- St. Augustine's Abbey, Ramsgate (1921). The Book of saints : a dictionary of servants of God canonized by the Catholic Church. London: A. & C. Black, ltd. OCLC 671676136. This article incorporates text from this source, which is in the public domain.
