= August 17 (Eastern Orthodox liturgics) =

Day in the Eastern Orthodox liturgical calendar

Eastern Orthodox liturgical calendar
August 16	August 17	August 18
August 17 O.S. ≍ August 30 N.S. August 17 N.S ≍ August 4 O.S.

An Eastern Orthodox cross

August 17 in Eastern Orthodox liturgical calendars is a feast day and a day of commemoration of saints and martyrs. Although some Orthodox churches use the Revised Julian Calendar and others use the traditional Julian calendar, the fixed commemorations for their respective August 17 are broadly the same, no matter which calendar is used. (Note: Despite the dates being the same, the days to which they refer typically differ by 13 days. The notation Old Style or O.S. is sometimes used to indicate a date in the traditional Julian Calendar (the "Old Calendar"). The notation New Style or N.S. indicates a date in the Revised Julian calendar (the "New Calendar").)

== Feasts ==
- Afterfeast of the Dormition. (Note: "In some places, the Burial Service of the Theotokos is celebrated on August 17 using a special epitaphios with an icon depicting the Mother of God.")

== Saints ==
- Hieromartyr Myron of Cyzicus, Priest (250) (Note: Patron of Antikythera.: See also: (in Greek): Άγιος Μύρων. Βικιπαίδεια. (Greek Wikipedia).) (Note: "In Achaia, St. Myron, priest and martyr, who was beheaded at Cyzicum, after undergoing many torments, in the time of the emperor Decius and the governor Antipater.")
- Martyrs Thyrsus, Leucius, and Callinicus (Coronatus), with others, of Caesarea in Bithynia (c. 250) (see also: December 14)
- Martyrs Paul and his sister Juliana, and Quadratus, Acacius and Stratonicus the executioners, at Ptolemais in Syria (273) (Note: "At Ptolemais, in Palestine, the holy martyrs Paul, and his sister Juliana, who suffered under Valerian.") (see also: March 4)
- Martyrs Straton, Philip, Eutychian, and Cyprian, of Nicomedia (303) (Note: "At Nicomedia, the holy martyrs Straton, Philip and Eutychian, who were condemned to the beasts, but being uninjured by them, ended their martyrdom by fire.")
- Venerable Monk-martyr Macarius of Mount St. Auxentius (768) (Note: His memory is recorded in the Byzantine church calendar of Gideon (p. 158). He was martyred in defense of the holy icons in the reign Copronymus in 768.)
- Venerable Elias the Younger of Calabria, (Elias of Enna) (903) (Note: He was the founder of a monastery, and an anchorite. He originated from Sicily. He prophesied the fall of Thessaloniki. He traveled to the Peloponnese and to Constantinople, where he fell ill, and on his return to Thessaloniki he reposed in the church of the Holy Apostles and St. Demetrius. He died on 17 August 903, which is his feast day.) (Note: We ought tentatively to regard it as probable that the saints whose lives have come down to us were really the founders of Greek monasticism in South Italy, and that before their time there were no Greek monasteries in the district. There probably were hermits; but the rise of monasteries does not begin before the end of the ninth century; and the leaders of the monks were Elias Junior (†903), Elias Spelaeotes ("the Cave-Dweller", †c. 960), Lucas of Demena (†984), Vitalis of Castronuovo (†994), and Nilus of Rossano (†1004).)
- Venerable Aiglon, a hermit who lived ascetically and reposed in peace.

== Pre-Schism Western saints ==
- Saint Eusebius, a Greek by birth, reposed in exile in Sicily (310)
- Saint Theodulus of Grammont (Theodore, Yoder), an early Bishop of Valais, who was much revered in Switzerland and Savoy (4th century)
- Hieromartyrs Liberatus, Boniface, Servus, Rusticus, Rogatus, Septimus, and Maximus, under the Arian King Hunneric (483) (Note: "At Carthage, in Africa, the holy martyrs Liberatus, abbot, Boniface, deacon, Servus and Rusticus, subdeacons, Rogatus and Septimus, monks, and Maximus, a young child. In the persecution of the Vandals, under king Hunneric, they were subjected to various unheard-of torments for the confession of the Catholic faith and the defense of one baptism. Finally, being nailed to the wood wherewith they were to be burned, as the fire was always put out miraculously whenever kindled, they were struck with iron bars by order of the tyrant until their brains were dashed out. Thus they terminated the glorious series of their combats, and were crowned by our Lord.")
- Saint Anastasius of Terni, Bishop of Terni in Italy (c. 553) (Note: "At Teramo, St. Anastasius, bishop and confessor.")
- Saint James the Deacon, companion of St Paulinus of York in his mission to Northumbria (after 671) (Note: "This eminent man, greatly commended for his ecclesiastical spirit and holy life, was the attendant deacon of St. Paulinus, Archbishop of York. When the Saint was obliged to return to Kent, in company with Queen Ethelburga, JAMES was left behind with the Northumbrian neophytes. He remained faithfully at his post throughout the troublous times which followed, and was able to teach and baptise many new converts. So great was the veneration in which his memory was held, that the place of his usual residence was called by his name. He was a steady observer of the disciplinary usages, which he had brought from Kent, and a skilful teacher of the Roman Church chant. James had the consolation of living to witness the restoration of Christianity in his adopted country, and was spared for many years for the service of God and the advantage of the faithful.") (see also: October 18)
- Saint Drithelm, monk at Melrose Abbey in Scotland, Confessor, great ascetic (c. 700)
- Saint Carloman, eldest son of Charles Martel, became King of Austrasia (754) (Note: He encouraged the foundation of monasteries at Fulda in Germany and Lobbes and Stavelot in Belgium. He also helped St Boniface in the task of enlightenment. On St Boniface's advice, he left his kingdom to his brother and became a monk on Mt Soracte and then at Montecassino in Italy. Here he was employed in the kitchen and as a shepherd. He reposed at a monastery in Vienne in France.)
- Saint Amor (Amator, Amour), companion of St Pirmin in preaching Christ in Germany, founder of the monastery of Amorbach in Franconia (8th century)
- Martyr Patroclus of Troyes, under Aurelian (270-275) (see also: January 21)
- Hieromartyr Jeroen (Hiero, Iero), hieromonk, at Noordwijk, Netherlands (857) (Note: See also: (in Dutch) Jeroen van Noordwijk. Wikipedia. (Dutch Wikipedia).) (Note: "An Irish missionary priest in Holland, where he was put to death for the Faith (A.D. 885).")
- Saint Benedicta and Cecilia, two daughters of the King of Lorraine, became nuns and successively Abbesses of Susteren Abbey, in the Rhineland, Germany (10th century)

== Post-Schism Orthodox saints ==
- Venerable Alypius the Iconographer, of the Kiev Caves Monastery (1114)
- Saint Tbeli Abuserisdze of Khikhuni, Adjara (13th century)
- Venerable Leucius, Abbot of Volokolamsk (1492) (see also: April 7)
- Blessed Theodoretus, Enlightener of the Laps in Solovki (1571)
- Saint Philip of Mt. Yankov Monastery, left bank of Sukhona River in Vologda, monk (1662)
- New Monk-martyr Agapius, at Thermes, near Thessalonica (1752)
- Venerable Monk-martyr Demetrius of Samarina (Pindos), at Ioannina (1808) (see also: August 18)
- Saint Nazaria, Schemanun, first abbess of Văratec Monastery, disciple of St. Basil of Poiana Mărului, St. Paisius Velichkovsky of Neamț, and St. Joseph of Văratec (1814) (Note: See: (in Romanian) Nazaria. Wikipedia. (Romanian Wikipedia).)
- Saint Olimpiada, Schemanun, founder and benefactor of Văratec Monastery, disciple of St. Paisius Velichkovsky of Neamț, St. Joseph of Văratec, and Venerable Nazaria of Văratec (1842) (Note: See: (in Romanian) Olimpiada (schimonahie). Wikipedia. (Romanian Wikipedia).)
- Saint Elisabeta (Safta) Brâncoveanu, Schemanun, resident of Văratec Monastery (1857) (Note: See: (in Romanian) Safta Brâncoveanu. Wikipedia. (Romanian Wikipedia).)
- Saint Pimen, Archimandrite, of Ugreshi Monastery (1880)
- Saint George the Pilgrim (Gheorghe Lazăr the Ascetic), of Piatra Neamț, in eastern Romania (1916) (Note: He established himself permanently in the city of Piatra Neamţ, living in asceticism like a true hermit in the bell tower of Stephen the Great in the middle of the city for 26 years, until his death. There he labored alone in fasting and prayer, summer and winter, without fire, without bed, without a coat, and without shoes on his feet, living in God's grace. He reposed on August 15, 1916 and was buried in the town cemetery. In the summer of 1934 his remains were placed in Văratec Monastery, in northeastern Romania. He is known as “Grandpa Gheorge” among the pious faithful. His relics, kept beneath the main church in the monastery, are fragrant.)
- Venerable Athanasios Hamakiotis, Greek Hieromonk and spiritual father noted for his pastoral work in Attica (1967) (Note: He was glorified by the Ecumenical Patriarchate on November 17, 2023. The official communiqué of the Ecumenical Patriarchate was as follows: (in Greek) "1. Κατ᾿ αὐτήν ὁμοφώνῳ συνοδικῇ ἀποφάσει κατετάγησαν εἰς τό Ἀγιολόγιον τῆς Ὀρθοδόξου Ἐκκλησίας: α) ὁ Ἱερομόναχος Ἀθανάσιος Χαμακιώτης, ἐκ τῆς Ἱερᾶς Μητροπόλεως Κηφισίας, Ἀμαρουσίου, Ὠρωποῦ καί Μαραθῶνος, καί β) ὁ Ἀρχιμανδρίτης Γερβάσιος Παρασκευόπουλος, ἐκ τῆς Ἱερᾶς Μητροπόλεως Πατρῶν, ἀμφότεροι διακριθέντες ἐπί ὁσιότητι καί θυσιαστικῇ διακονίᾳ τοῦ Χριστωνύμου λαοῦ, ἐγχαραχθέντες ἐξ ἀρχῆς ὡς Ἅγιοι εἰς τήν συνείδησιν αὐτοῦ." The Ecumenical Patriarchate later signed the Patriarchal and Synodal Act of canonization on December 28, 2023.)

=== New martyrs and confessors ===
- New Hieromartyr Alexis Velikoselsky, Priest (1918)
- New Hieromartyr Demetrius Ostroumov, Priest (1937)

== Other commemorations ==
- Repose of Schemanun Ardaliona of Ust-Medveditsky Convent (1864)
- Repose of Schemamonk Onuphrius of Valaam Monastery (1912)

=== Icons ===
- Icon of the Most Holy Theotokos of "Armatia", Constantinople. (see also: July 21)
- Icon of the Most Holy Theotokos of "Svensk" (1288) (Note: The Sven Icon of the Mother of God of the Caves has two festal celebrations: May 3 (the day of the repose of St Theodosius of the Caves), and August 17 (the day of the repose of St Alypius), who painted the icon. The August 17 celebration was established in the year 1815 in thanksgiving for the deliverance of the city of Briansk (around which the icon appeared in 1288) from invasion during the 1812 Napoleonic War.)
- Icon of Panagia of Goumenissa. (Note: The Monastery of Panagia Goumenissa (c. 14th century) celebrates a three-day feast from August 15th-17th.) (see also: February 2)

== Icon gallery ==
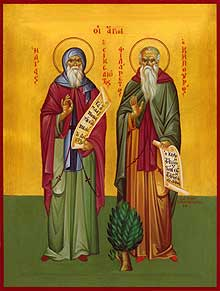
St. Elias the Younger (left), with St. Philaret of Seminara (right).

== Sources ==
- August 17 / August 30. Orthodox Calendar (PRAVOSLAVIE.RU).
- August 30 / August 17. Holy Trinity Russian Orthodox Church (A parish of the Patriarchate of Moscow).
- August 17. OCA - The Lives of the Saints.
- The Autonomous Orthodox Metropolia of Western Europe and the Americas (ROCOR). St. Hilarion Calendar of Saints for the year of our Lord 2004. St. Hilarion Press (Austin, TX). pp. 60–61.
- Menologion: The Seventeenth Day Day of the Month of August. Orthodoxy in China.
- August 17. Latin Saints of the Orthodox Patriarchate of Rome.
- The Roman Martyrology. Transl. by the Archbishop of Baltimore. Last Edition, According to the Copy Printed at Rome in 1914. Revised Edition, with the Imprimatur of His Eminence Cardinal Gibbons. Baltimore: John Murphy Company, 1916. pp. 246–247.
- Rev. Richard Stanton. A Menology of England and Wales, or, Brief Memorials of the Ancient British and English Saints Arranged According to the Calendar, Together with the Martyrs of the 16th and 17th Centuries. London: Burns & Oates, 1892. pp. 396–397.

Greek Sources

- Great Synaxaristes: (in Greek) 17 ΑΥΓΟΥΣΤΟΥ. ΜΕΓΑΣ ΣΥΝΑΞΑΡΙΣΤΗΣ.
- (in Greek) Συναξαριστής. 17 Αυγούστου. ECCLESIA.GR. (H ΕΚΚΛΗΣΙΑ ΤΗΣ ΕΛΛΑΔΟΣ).

Russian Sources

- (in Russian) 30 августа (17 августа). Православная Энциклопедия под редакцией Патриарха Московского и всея Руси Кирилла (электронная версия). (Orthodox Encyclopedia - Pravenc.ru).
