= August 18 (Eastern Orthodox liturgics) =

Day in the Eastern Orthodox liturgical calendar

Eastern Orthodox liturgical calendar
August 17	August 18	August 19
August 18 O.S. ≍ August 31 N.S. August 18 N.S ≍ August 5 O.S.

An Eastern Orthodox cross

August 18 in Eastern Orthodox liturgical calendars is a feast day and a day of commemoration of saints and martyrs. Although some Orthodox churches use the Revised Julian Calendar and others use the traditional Julian calendar, the fixed commemorations for their respective August 18 are broadly the same, no matter which calendar is used. (Note: Despite the dates being the same, the days to which they refer typically differ by 13 days. The notation Old Style or O.S. is sometimes used to indicate a date in the traditional Julian Calendar (the "Old Calendar"). The notation New Style or N.S. indicates a date in the Revised Julian calendar (the "New Calendar").)

== Saints ==
- Martyrs Florus and Laurus of Illyria, twin brothers who worked as stonemasons (2nd century) (Note: Name days celebrated today include: Florus (Φλῶρος); Flora (Φλώρα).) (Note: "In Dalmatia, the holy martyrs Florus and Laurus, stonecutters, who, after the martyrdom of Proculus and Maximus, their employers, were subjected to many torments under the governor Licion, and plunged into a deep well.")
- The Holy Host of Paupers (300 martyrs), brought together by Saints Florus and Laurus, who smashed the statues of the pagan gods and were martyred by fire. (Note: "When the construction of the temple was completed, the brothers gathered the Christians together, and going through the temple, they smashed the idols. In the eastern part of the temple they set up the holy Cross. They spent all night in prayer, illumined with heavenly light. Having learned of this, the head of the district condemned to burning the former pagan priest Mamertin and his son and 300 Christians.")
- Martyrs Hermes, Serapion, Polyaenus of Rome (2nd century) (Note: "In the same city, the holy martyrs Hernias, Serapion, and Polyaenus. Being dragged through narrow, stony, and craggy places, they yielded up their souls to God.")
- Hieromartyr Emilian, Bishop of Trebia in Umbria, and lay martyrs Hilarion, Dionysius, Hermippus, and about 1,000 others, in Italy (c. 300) (Note: The Book of Saints compiled by the Benedictine Monks of St. Augustine's Abbey, Ramsgate (1921), has the following two entries for these saints: "AEMILIAN (St.) Bp. M. (Feb. 8). "Some writers, however, identify this St. AEmilian with another Martyr of the same name, likewise an Armenian, venerated at Trebbia (Trevi) in Central Italy, as first Bishop of that city (4th century).; DIONYSIUS, AEMILIAN and SEBASTIAN (SS.) MM. (Feb. 8). (Date unknown). "The Roman Martyrology describes them as Armenian monks; but there have been disputes among the learned as to the nationality of some of them. In reality we are no longer in possession of anything like adequate evidence bearing on their date, lives or martyrdom.")
- Venerable Barnabas and his nephew Sophronius, founders of Mount Mela Monastery (Panagia Soumela), near Trebizond (412)
- Venerable Christopher of Trebizond, Abbot of Mount Mela Monastery (Panagia Soumela) (668)
- Saints John (674) and George (683), Patriarchs of Constantinople.
- Martyr Juliana near Strobilos in Lycia. (Note: Possibly the same saint as is commemorated on December 21.)
- Martyr Leo, drowned off the coast of Myra in Lycia. (Note: Possibly the same saint as is commemorated on February 18.)
- The 4 Venerable Ascetics, reposed in peace.
- Saint Macarius, Abbot of the Pelekete Monastery near Prusa, Bithynia (840) (see also: April 1)
- Venerable John of Rila, founder and Abbot of Rila Monastery, Bulgaria (946) (see also: October 19)

== Pre-Schism Western saints ==
- Saint Agapitus of Palestrina, a fifteen-year-old who bravely confessed Christ and was martyred in Palestrina near Rome (c. 274) (Note: "AT Palestrina, the birthday of the holy martyr Agapitus. Although only fifteen years of age, as he was fervent in the love of Christ, he was arrested by order of the emperor Aurelian, and scourged a long time. Afterwards, under the prefect Antiochus, he endured more severe torments, and being delivered to the lions by the emperor's order without receiving any injury, he was finally struck with the sword, and thus merited his crown." He is the patron-saint of Palestrina, where as early as the fifth century a church was dedicated to him.)
- Martyrs John and Crispus, priests in Rome who devoted themselves to recovering and burying the bodies of the martyrs, for which they also suffered martyrdom. (Note: "At Rome, during the persecution of Diocletian, the blessed John and Crispus, priests, who charitably buried the bodies of many saints, and afterwards becoming partakers of their merits, they deserved the joys of eternal life.")
- Saint Firminus of Metz, Greek or Italian by origin, he was Bishop of Metz in France for eight years, Confessor (496)
- Saint Daig Maccairill (Daig, Dagaeus, Daganus), disciple of St Finian, he founded a monastery at Inis Cain Dega (Inniskeen), and was both abbot and bishop (586)
- Saint Milo, a monk together with his father at Fontenelle Abbey in France, and later a hermit (c. 740)
- Saint Inan (Evan), a hermit in Ayrshire in Scotland, where churches are dedicated to him (9th century)

== Post-Schism Orthodox saints ==
- Saint Christodoulus the Philosopher, called "the Ossetian," of Georgia (12th century)
- Venerable Sophronius of St. Anne's skete on Mount Athos (18th century)
- New Monk-martyr Demetrius the Vlach, of Samarina (Pindos), at Ioannina (1808) (see also: August 17)

=== New martyrs and confessors ===
- New Hieromartyrs Archimandrite Augustine of Orans Monastery, (Note: See also: (in Russian) Оранский Богородицкий монастырь. Википедии. (Russian Wikipedia).) and Archpriest Nicholas of Nizhni-Novgorod, and 15 people with them (1918)
- New Hieromartyr Gregory Bronnikov, Priest, and Martyr Eugene Dmitriev and Michael Eregodsky (1937)

== Other commemorations ==
- Uncovering of the Relics of Venerable Arsenios the New of Paros (1877)
- Repose of Schemamonk Nicholas "the Turk," of Optina Skete (1893)

=== Icons ===
- Icon of the Mother of God the "Directress" ("Hodegetria") of Trebizond, also known as "Panagia Soumeliotissa".

== Icon gallery ==
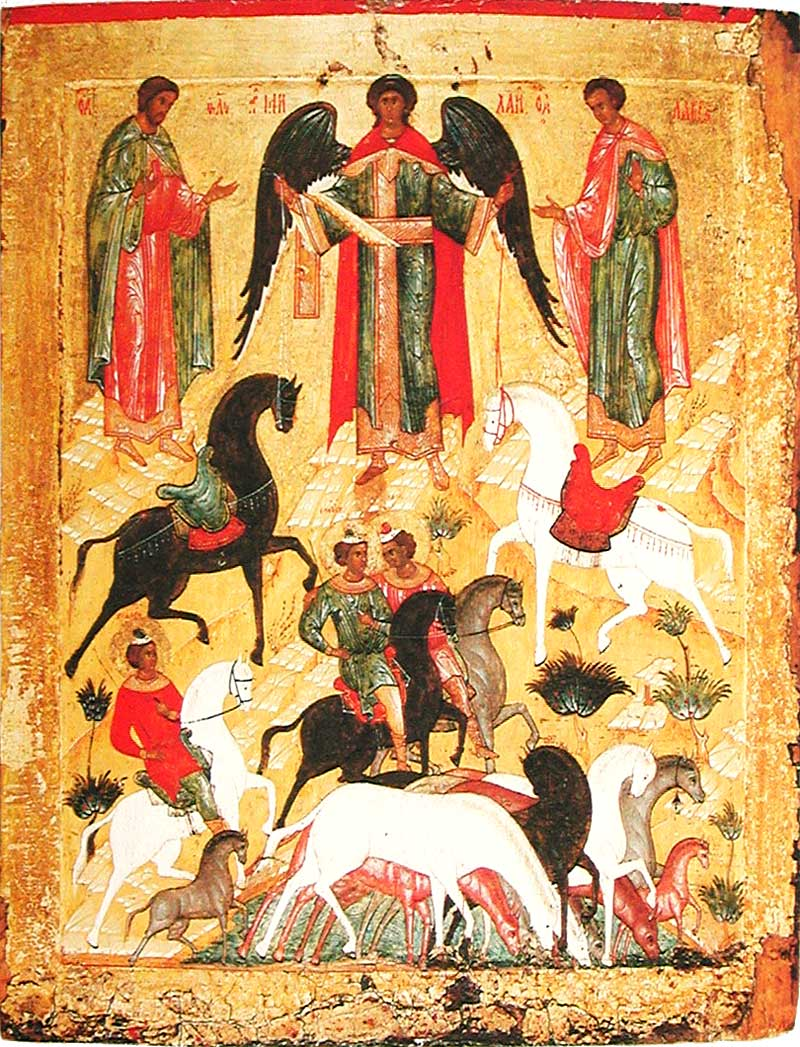
A15th-century Novgorod icon of Sts. Florus and Laurus.

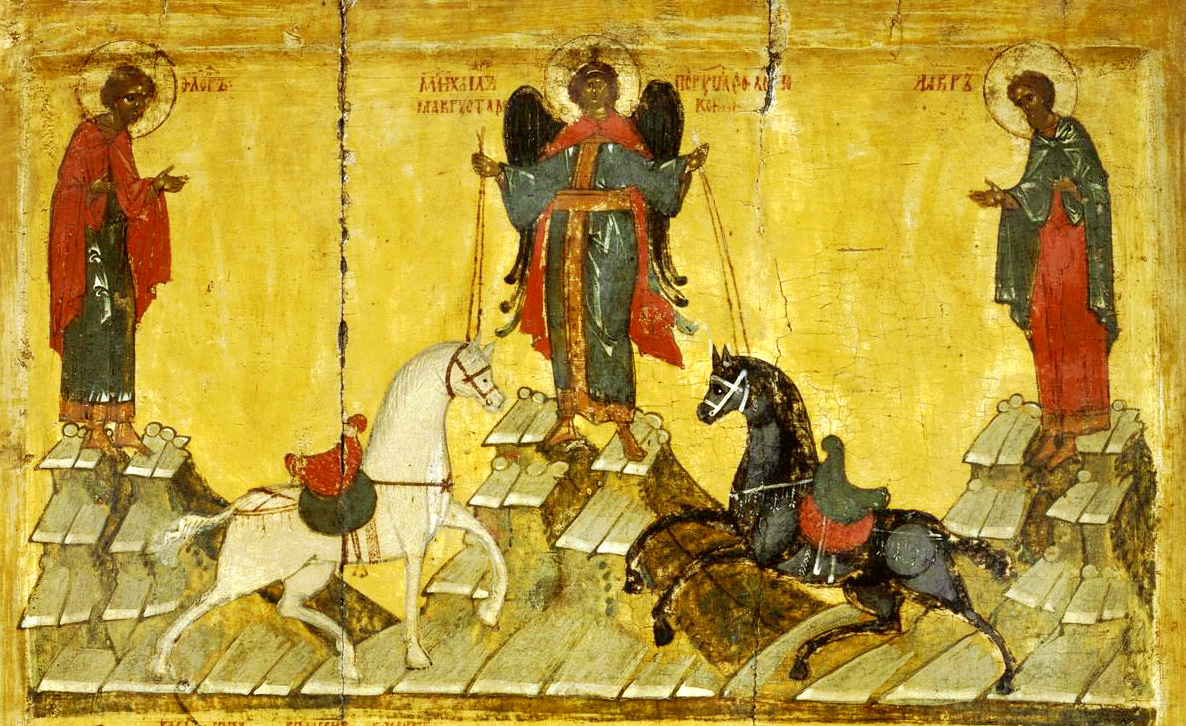
Sts. Florus and Laurus.

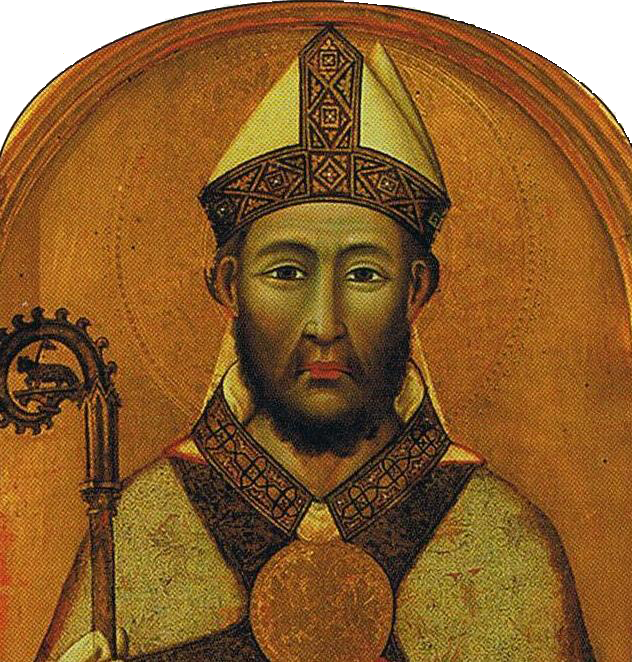
Hieromartyr Emilian, Bishop of Trebia in Umbria.

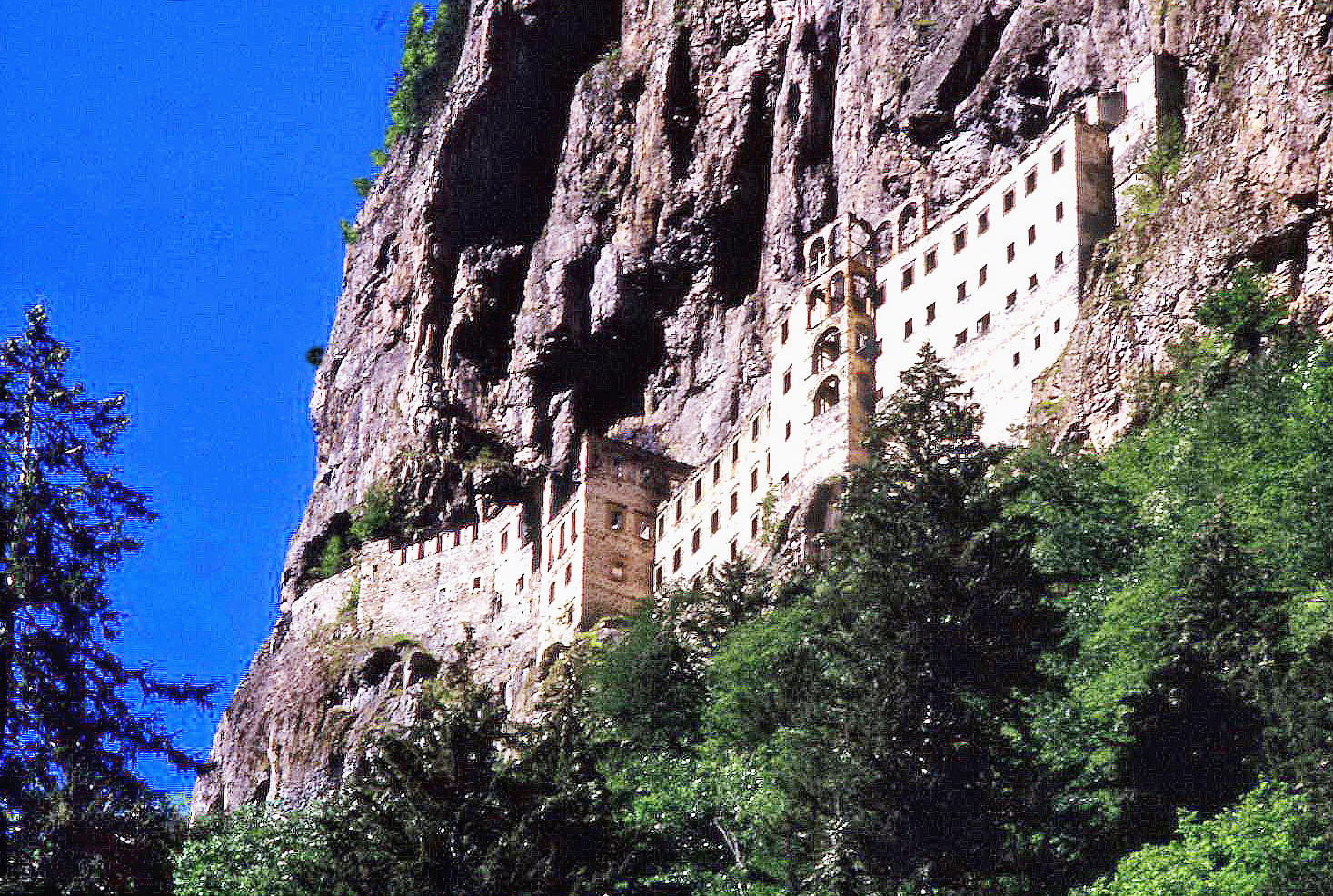
Mount Mela Monastery (Panagia Soumela), founded by Barnabas and Sophronius, and later Christopher of Trebizond.

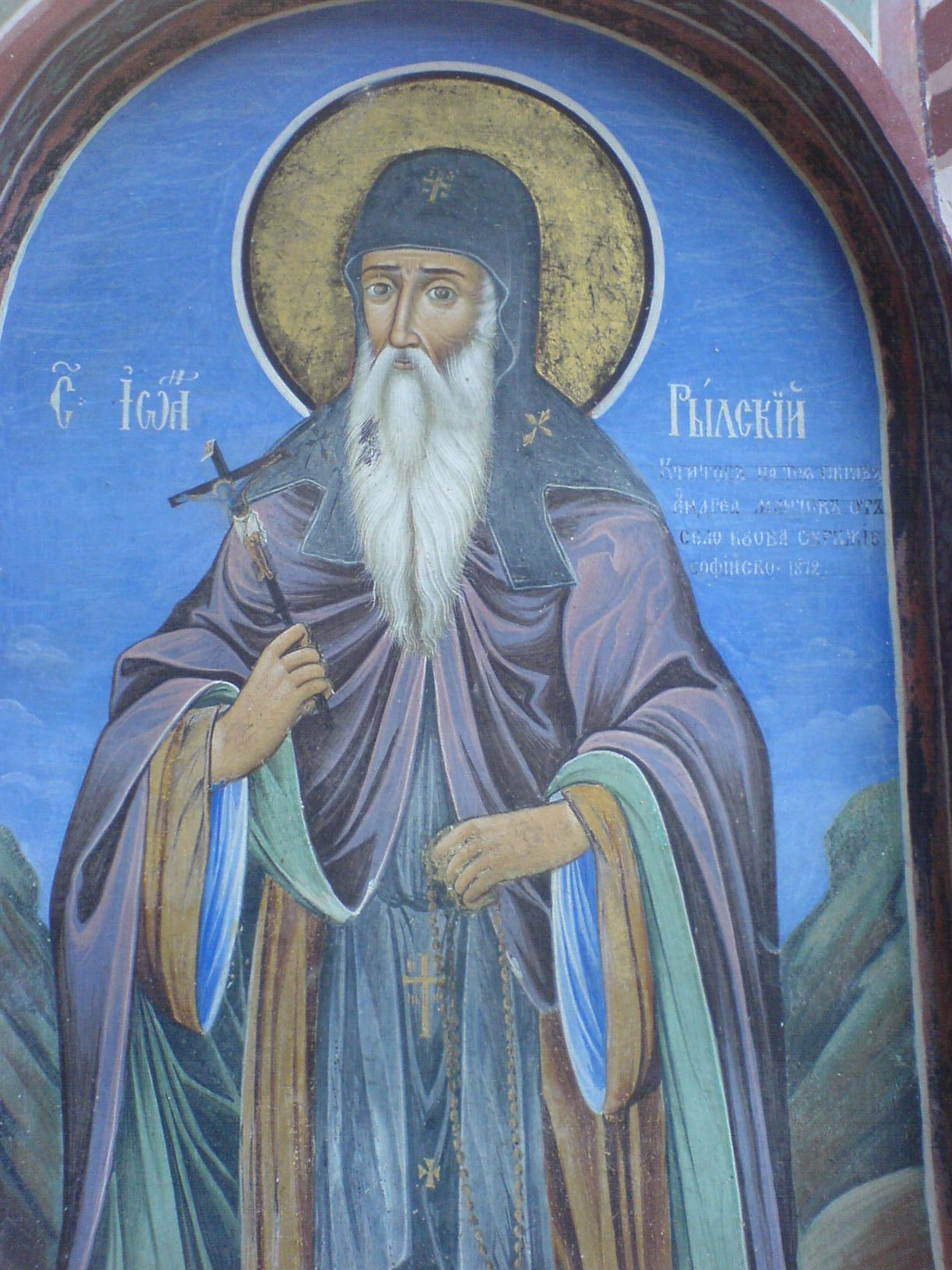
St. John of Rila, fresco from Rila monastery, Bulgaria.

== Sources ==
- August 18 / August 31. Orthodox Calendar (PRAVOSLAVIE.RU).
- August 31 / August 18. Holy Trinity Russian Orthodox Church (A parish of the Patriarchate of Moscow).
- August 18. OCA - The Lives of the Saints.
- The Autonomous Orthodox Metropolia of Western Europe and the Americas (ROCOR). St. Hilarion Calendar of Saints for the year of our Lord 2004. St. Hilarion Press (Austin, TX). p. 61.
- Menologion: The Eighteenth Day Day of the Month of August. Orthodoxy in China.
- August 18. Latin Saints of the Orthodox Patriarchate of Rome.
- The Roman Martyrology. Transl. by the Archbishop of Baltimore. Last Edition, According to the Copy Printed at Rome in 1914. Revised Edition, with the Imprimatur of His Eminence Cardinal Gibbons. Baltimore: John Murphy Company, 1916. pp. 247–248.
- Rev. Richard Stanton. A Menology of England and Wales, or, Brief Memorials of the Ancient British and English Saints Arranged According to the Calendar, Together with the Martyrs of the 16th and 17th Centuries. London: Burns & Oates, 1892. pp. 397–399.

Greek Sources

- Great Synaxaristes: (in Greek) 18 ΑΥΓΟΥΣΤΟΥ. ΜΕΓΑΣ ΣΥΝΑΞΑΡΙΣΤΗΣ.
- (in Greek) Συναξαριστής. 18 Αυγούστου. ECCLESIA.GR. (H ΕΚΚΛΗΣΙΑ ΤΗΣ ΕΛΛΑΔΟΣ).

Russian Sources

- (in Russian) 31 августа (18 августа). Православная Энциклопедия под редакцией Патриарха Московского и всея Руси Кирилла (электронная версия). (Orthodox Encyclopedia - Pravenc.ru).
