= Timeline of Eastern Orthodoxy in Greece (33–717) =

This is a timeline of the presence of Eastern Orthodoxy in Greece from 33 to 717 AD. The history of Greece traditionally encompasses the study of the Greek people, the areas they ruled historically, as well as the territory now composing the modern state of Greece.

== Overview ==
Christianity was first brought to the geographical area corresponding to modern Greece by the Apostle Paul, although the church's apostolicity also rests upon St. Andrew who preached the gospel in Greece and suffered martyrdom in Patras; Titus, Paul's companion who preached the gospel in Crete where he became bishop; Philip who, according to the tradition, visited and preached in Athens; Luke the Evangelist who was martyred in Thebes; Lazarus of Bethany, Bishop of Kition in Cyprus; and John the Theologian who was exiled on the island of Patmos where he received the Revelation recorded in the last book of the New Testament. In addition, the Theotokos is regarded as having visited the Holy Mountain in 49 AD according to tradition. (Note: The Theotokos is the Patron of Mount Athos, which is known as: The Garden of the Mother of God, and The Holy Mountain of Our Lady. The arrival of the Theotokos at the Mountain is mentioned by codices L' 66 and I' 31 of the Library of Great Lavra Monastery.) Thus Greece became the first European area to accept the gospel of Christ. Towards the end of the 2nd century the early apostolic bishoprics had developed into metropolitan sees in the most important cities. Such were the sees of Thessaloniki, Corinth, Nicopolis, Philippi and Athens.

By the 4th century almost the entire Balkan peninsula constituted the Exarchate of Illyricum which was under the jurisdiction of the Bishop of Rome. Illyricum was assigned to the jurisdiction of the Patriarch of Constantinople by the emperor in 732. From then on the Church in Greece remained under Constantinople till the fall of the Byzantine Empire to the Ottoman Empire in 1453. As an integral part of the Ecumenical Patriarchate, the church remained under its jurisdiction until Greek independence. Under Ottoman rule, up to "6,000 Greek clergymen, ca. 100 Bishops, and 11 Patriarchs knew the Ottoman sword". (Note: "According to several accounts, from the Conquest of Constantinople to the last phase of the Greek War of Independence, the Ottoman Turks condemned to death 11 Ecumenical Patriarchs of Constantinople, nearly 100 bishops, and several thousands of priests, deacons and monks (Bompolines, 1952; Paparounis, no date; Perantones, 1972; Pouqueville, 1824; Vaporis, 2000.).")

The Greek War of Independence of 1821–28 created an independent southern Greece, but created anomalies in ecclesiastical relations since the Ecumenical Patriarch remained under Ottoman tutelage, and in 1850 the Endemousa Synod in Constantinople declared the Church of Greece autocephalous.

The cultural roots of both Byzantine and modern Greece cannot be separated from Orthodoxy. Therefore, it was natural that in all Greek Constitutions the Orthodox Church was accorded the status of the prevailing religion. (Note: The provisions of the 1844 Constitution, where the Bavarian regency bequeathed the Hellenic State with a kind of caesaropapism, were repeated in articles 1 and 2 of the 1864 Constitution; article 1 and 2 of the 1911 Constitution; article 1 of the 1927 Constitution; articles 1 and 2 of the 1952 Constitution; article 1 of the 1968 constitutional text of the military dictatorship; and article 3 of the 1975 Constitution; (as well as article 9 of the 1925 and 1926 Constitutions, which were never enforced).)

In the 20th century, during much of the period of communism, the Church of Greece saw itself as a guardian of Orthodoxy. It cherishes its place as the cradle of the primitive church and the Greek clergy are still present in the historic places of Istanbul and Jerusalem, and Cyprus. The autocephalous Church of Greece is organised into 81 dioceses, however 35 of these – known as the Metropolises of the New Lands – are nominally under the jurisdiction of the Ecumenical Patriarchate of Constantinople but are administered as part of the Church of Greece; although the dioceses of Crete, the Dodecanese, and Mount Athos are under the direct jurisdiction of the Patriarchate of Constantinople. (Note: "Codified in the 1928 Patriarchal and Synodical Act, the "New Lands" were entrusted to the temporary stewardship of the Church of Greece, provided that the Church respected the terms of the Act. The Act subsequently has been incorporated into several pieces of Greek legislation (Laws 3615/1928, 5438/1932, 599/1977, and Article 3, paragraph 1 of the current Greek Constitution), thereby recognizing the ecclesiastical agreement between the two sides.")

The Archbishop of Athens and All Greece presides over both a standing synod of twelve metropolitans (six from the new territories and six from southern Greece), who participate in the synod in rotation and on an annual basis, and a synod of the hierarchy (in which all ruling metropolitans participate), which meets once a year.

The government observes several religious holidays as national holidays including Epiphany, Clean Monday (the start of Great Lent), Good Friday, Easter Sunday, Easter Monday, Holy Spirit Day, the Dormition of the Theotokos and Christmas.

Among the current concerns of the Church of Greece are the Christian response to globalization, to interreligious dialogue, and a common Christian voice within the framework of the European Union.

The population of Greece is 11.4 million (2011), (Note: The World Bank gives a figure of 11.30 million (2011), while according to the 2011 Greek Census, the total enumerated population was 10,787,690.) of which 95% (Note: According to a December 2011 nationwide survey conducted by Metron Analysis (one of the biggest independent market research and public opinion survey companies in Greece), 95% of those polled reported that they were Orthodox Christians, while 1.5% said that they belong to some other religion, and 2.8% of the population said that they were irreligious or atheist, which is among the lowest figures in Europe.) to 98% are Greek Orthodox.

== The early church in Greece (33–325) ==
=== Apostolic era (33–100) ===
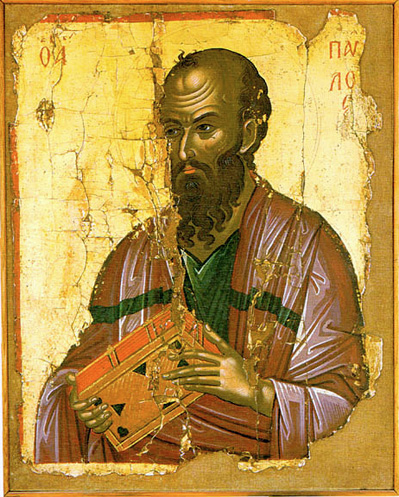
Icon of Apostle Paul, Apostle of Greece and Cyprus.

- c. 45–46 Apostle Paul's mission to Cyprus, where he converts proconsul Quintus Sergius Paullus.
- c. 49 Paul's mission to Philippi, Thessaloniki and Veria; Lydia of Thyatira becomes the first convert to Christianity in Europe after hearing Paul's words in Philippi proclaiming the Gospel of Christ during his second missionary journey.

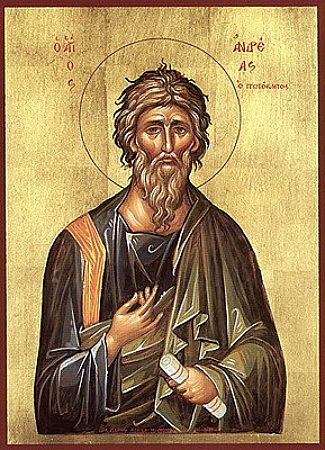
Icon of Apostle Andrew, considered the founder and first bishop of the Church of Byzantium.

- c. 50–51 Paul's mission to Athens, during his second missionary journey; Metropolis of Corinth founded during Paul's first mission to Corinth; Paul writes his two Epistles to the Thessalonians, from Corinth.
- c. 52–53 Hierotheos the Thesmothete, a member of the Athenian Areopagos was converted to Christ by the Apostle Paul and became the first Bishop of Athens, later dying a martyr's death.
- c. 54 Paul writes his First Epistle to the Corinthians, during his third missionary journey.
- c. 55 Paul writes his Second Epistle to the Corinthians from Illyria Graeca.
- c. 56 Paul revisits Macedonia.
- c. 60 Crucifixion of Apostle Andrew the First-called, in Patras.
- c. 61 Barnabas, founder of Church of Cyprus, traditionally thought to have been martyred in Salamis; Paul's ship lands at Kaloi Limenes (Fair Havens) on the southern coast of Crete, as he was traveling as a prisoner to Rome.
- c. 64 Paul ordained the Apostle Titus bishop of Gortyn in Crete, becoming the first Bishop of Crete.
- c. 95 Apocalypse of John written on the island of Patmos.
- 96 Martyrdom of Dionysius the Areopagite of the Seventy.
- 100 Death of St. John the Theologian in Ephesus.

=== Ante-Nicene era (100–325) ===
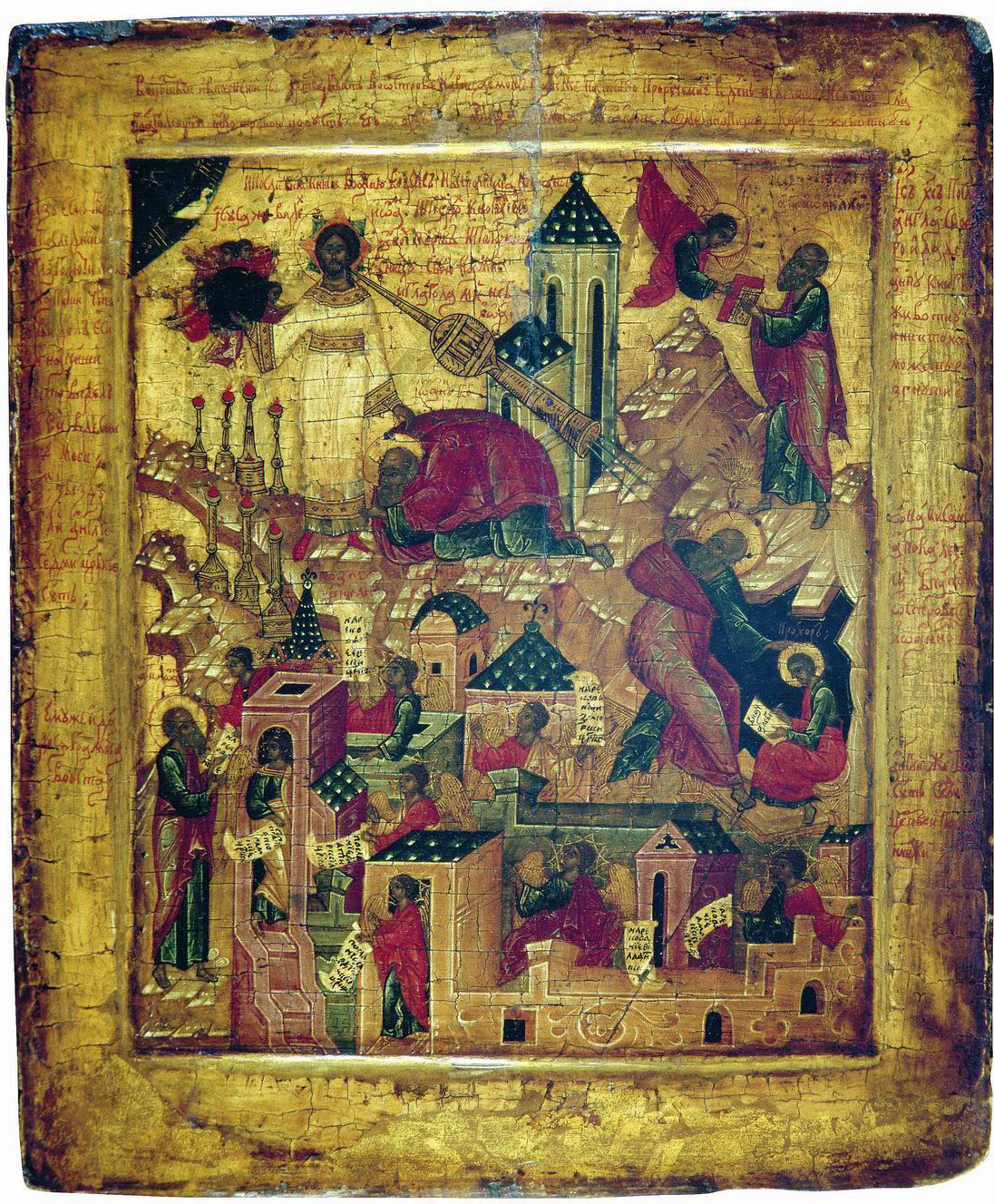
icon of St. John the Theologian receiving the Apocalypse on the isle of Patmos (16th century)

- c. 100–293 During the 2nd and 3rd centuries, Greece was divided into provinces including Achaea, Macedonia, and Moesia. (Note: "In 27 BC Augustus divided the area into three provinces – Achaea, Epirus and Macedonia, the latter becoming a senatorial province. In 15 Tiberius joined the provinces of Macedonia, Achaea and Moesia under the command of a single legate, a move reversed by Claudius in 44, who restored Macedonia and Achaea as senatorial provinces. Nero proclaimed "freedom" for Greece in 67, which included exemption from taxes, but this proclamation was reversed by Vespasian. By the reign of Antoninus Pius at the very latest, Epirus was detached from Macedonia as a separate province. In Diocletian's reorganization the area was divided into five provinces within the Diocese of Moesia.")
- c. 120 Martyrdom of Eleutherios and his mother Anthia.
- 124 Apostles Quadratus and Aristides present Christian apologies to Emperor Hadrian at Athens.
- c. 130-140 Aquila completes a literal Greek translation of the Old Testament; (Note: The Christians generally disliked it, alleging that it rendered the Messianic passages incorrectly, but Jerome and Origen speak in its praise. Origen incorporated it in his Hexapla.) (Note: "He was by birth a Gentile from Pontus, and is said by Epiphanius to have been a connection by marriage of the emperor Hadrian and to have been appointed by him about the year 128 to an office concerned with the rebuilding of Jerusalem as "Ælia Capitolina"...According to Jerome he was a disciple of Rabbi Akiba (d. A.D. 132). The Talmud states that he finished his translations under the influence of R. Akiba...It is certain, however, that Aquila's translation had appeared before the publication of Irenæus' "Adversus Hæreses"; i.e., before 177.") death of Apostle Quadratus, of the Seventy.
- 156 Martyrdom of Polycarp of Smyrna.
- c. 170-180 Emergence of the Muratorian Canon in Greek, the first clear witness to a catalog of authoritative New Testament writings.
- 180–192 Theodotion's Greek translation of the Old Testament. (Note: "If, indeed, we could rely on Epiphanius, the doubt would be solved, for he confidently asserts that Theodotion issued his version in 'the reign of the second Commodus' (i.e. 180–192)...On his authority the Paschal Chronicle sets in down as 184.")
- 180 Death of Pinytus, Bishop of Knossos in Crete, described by Eusebius as one of the foremost ecclesiastical writers of his time. (Note: "EUSEBIUS speaks of Pinitus, Bishop of Gnossus, in Crete, who lived at the time of Dionysius of Corinth. Dionysius wrote to Pinitus, "not to impose on the brethren, without necessity, too severe a burden in regard to purity, but to pay regard to the infirmity of the great bulk of the people." To which Pinitus, writing in reply, said that he admired and applauded Dionysius, but exhorted him, at the same time, to impart some time or other food which was stronger to his flock, and to feed them with writings abounding in more perfect doctrine, so that they might not remain constantly imbibing the mere milk of doctrine, and grow old under a discipline calculated for children. "In this epistle also, the correct views which Pinitus cherished, and his solicitude for those committed to his care, also his learning and intelligence in divine matters, appear evidently."")
- 190 Death of Athenagoras of Athens, a Christian apologist who wrote in defense of the resurrection of the dead.
- 193–211 Symmachus' Greek translation of the Old Testament.
- 202 Death of Great Martyr Charalambos, Bishop of Magnesia.
- 210 Hippolytus of Rome, bishop and martyr and last of Greek-speaking fathers in Rome, writes Refutation of All Heresies (Philosophumena), and Apostolic Tradition.
- c. 215 Death of Clement of Alexandria, who led the Catechetical School of Alexandria and was notable for uniting Greek philosophy and exegesis with Christian doctrine.
- c. 250 Matrydom of Christopher of Lycia; martyrdom of Cyprian and Justina at Nicomedia; death of Hieromartyr Leonidas, Bp. of Athens; the earliest known prayer to the Theotokos is recorded on 'Greek Papyrus 470', dated to c. 250 AD. (Note: The earliest known prayer to the Theotokos (Greek, Θεοτόκος, meaning "Bearer of God") is a prayer found on a fragment of papyrus dating back to approximately AD 250. In 1917, the John Rylands Library in Manchester, England, acquired a large panel of Egyptian papyrus. The prayer is located on the fragment recorded as reference number Greek Papyrus 470. The prayer appears to be from a Coptic Christmas liturgy or vespers written in Koine Greek although the fragment in question may be a private copy of the prayer. The prayer is still chanted in the Orthodox Church to this day at the end of nearly every Vespers service during Lent. It is also found in the worship services of the Roman Catholic and Oriental Churches. The early date of this prayer is important for a number of reasons, one of which is that it supports our understanding that the term Theotokos was not just a theological concept defended at the Third Ecumenical Council in AD 431, but was already in popular use and well-known several centuries before the Nestorian heresy. As St. Gregory of Nazianzus stated in AD 379, "If someone does not uphold that the holy Mary is Theotokos, he is separated from divinity" (Letter 101, PG 37, 177C). Early Christians recognized the Theotokos as a powerful intercessor for those who are suffering and in need of protection. Christians have been seeking her intercessions from the time of the ancient Church and well over a thousand years up to this very day. The prayer reads: Beneath thy compassion, We take refuge, O Mother of God: do not despise our petitions in time of trouble, but rescue us from dangers, only pure one, only blessed one.)
- c. 251 Martyric death of Isidore of Chios under the persecutions of Decius.
- 262 Great incursion of the Goths into Ionia, Troas, Lydia and Phrygia in Asia Minor. (Note: "The invasions of the Goths into the Greek-inhabited districts of the Balkan peninsula and the north and west coasts of Anatolia began in the middle of the 3rd century. Although these plundering raids were at first restricted to Greek outposts on the northern shores of the Black Sea and along the Lower Danube, after the serious defeat of the Romans and the death of emperor Decius in the battle of Abrittus in the Dobrudja (251 A.D.) the situation changed fundamentally. From then on no place was safe from the daring incursions of the northern tribes. In 253 A.D. the ships of the Goths, the Burgundians, Carpi, and Borani (the last probably a Sarmatian tribe) appeared for the first time in the waters of Asia Minor. Similar expeditions repeated themselves year after year.")

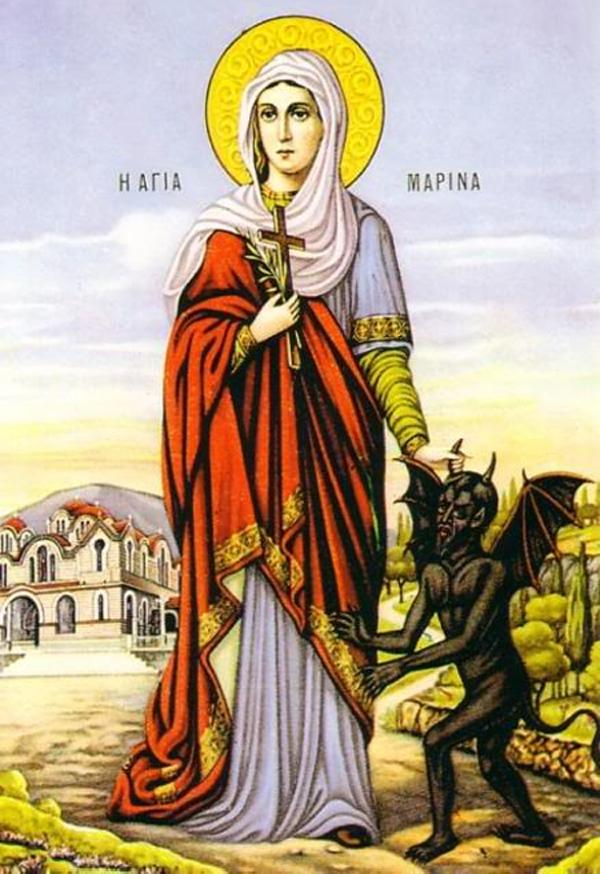
St. Marina the Great-Martyr (†286).

- 267 Hordes of Heruli penetrated deep into the Peloponnesus, took Athens, and ravaged Corinth, Sparta and Argos. (Note: "Herennius Dexippus went out against them with a small force of 2000 Athenians – that was all the city could throw into the field – and defeated one of their armies.")
- 270 Death of Gregory the Wonderworker (Thaumaturgus), founder of the Church in Cappadocia.
- 286 Death of Marina the Great-Martyr; (Note: The Great Synaxaristes records her birth in the year 270AD, and her martyrdom at the age of 15. The Vatican suppressed her cult in 1969.) Martyrs Timothy and Mavra.

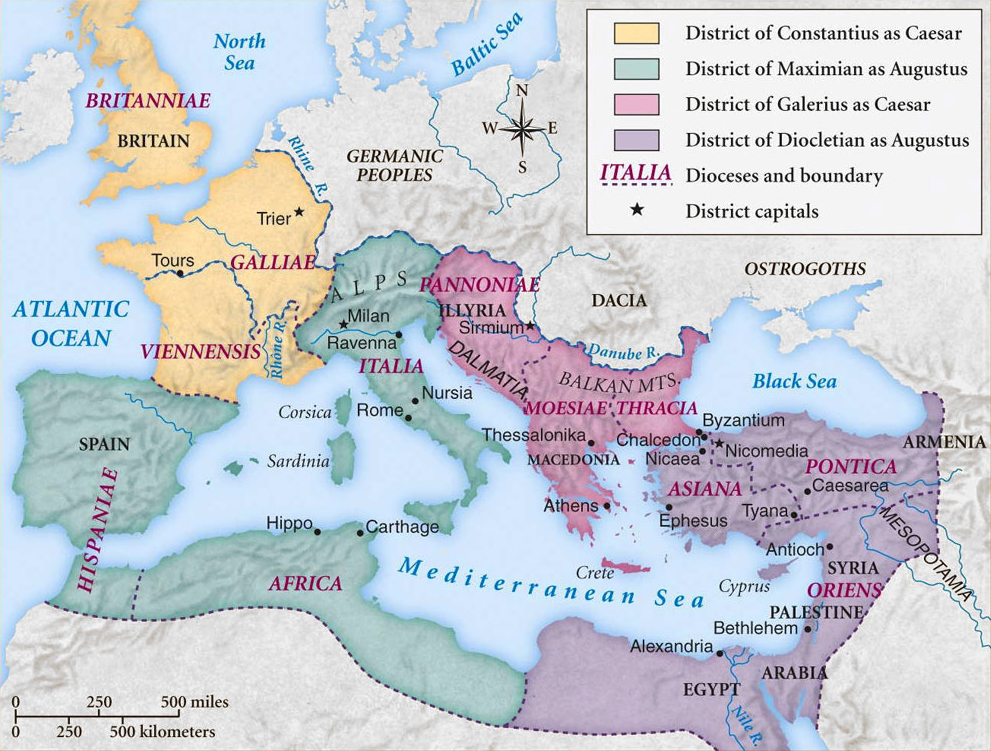
Map of the Roman Empire showing the Dioceses created by Diocletian, c. 293 AD., and the four Tetrarchs' zones of influence.

- 293 Emperor Diocletian institutes the Tetrarchy.
- 302 20,000 Martyrs burned at Nicomedia.
- 303 Death of Great-Martyr Panteleimon and martyrdom of George the Trophy-bearer at Nicomedia.
- 304 Death of Virgin-Martyr Anysia of Thessaloniki.
- 306 Martyric death of Demetrios of Thessaloniki;
- c. 306 Death of Great-Martyr Barbara of Nicomedia; the Church of the Rotonda in Thessaloniki is built as the "Tomb of Galerius", later converted into a Christian church on the orders of Emperor Constantine I (the Church of Agios Georgios). (Note: "Originally the Rotonda formed part of a larger complex of buildings including a triumphal arch over the Via Egnatia, a hippodrome, an octagonal building and several palaces built by Galerius. The Rotonda, as it is called in Greek (with an 'o'), is one of the largest, covered, round Roman buildings still standing today and it is a valuable historical monument on architectural grounds alone. The Pantheon in Rome is a comparable structure... ...Between the 10th and the 12th centuries, and again between 1525 and 1591, the Rotonda served as the main cathedral of Thessaloniki... ...In 1962 the Greek government declared the Rotonda a 'historical conservation monument (istoriko diatiriteo mnimeio) and an archaeological space'. And in 1986 UNESCO included it in its catalogue of international heritage monuments.")
- 306-37 Reign of Emperor Constantine the Great. (Note: "In the history of the Roman Empire and late Greek culture, the reign of Constantine I forms a break. The agreements reached at Milan in 313 A.D. between Constantine and Licinius to place Christianity on an equal footing with the other religions, and besides this to build Constantinople on the Bosporus, mark the beginning of a new era. Constantine laid the foundations of the later Byzantine Empire, which was based on Roman political ideas, on the Greek people and on Greek culture. Once more, thanks to Constantine, the political and cultural primacy shifted from the West to the East.")
- 311 Edict of Toleration by Galerius officially ending the Diocletian persecution of Christianity; Martyrdom of Bp. Methodius of Olympus.

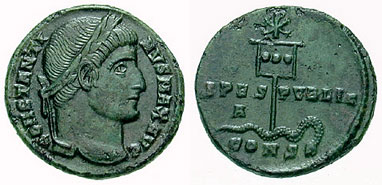
A coin of Constantine (c.337) showing a depiction of his Labarum standard spearing a serpent.

- 313 Edict of Milan issued by Constantine the Great and co-emperor Licinius, officially declaring religious freedom in the Roman Empire. (Note: "This law went further than Galerius' edict of toleration in 311, "by the raising, in a formal juristic manner, of each individual church, and therefore the whole, the universal Church, to the level of a full juristic personality: this was the acknowledgement of the Church as a corpus in a juristic sense." ")
- 314 Council of Ancyra held.
- 316 Death of Blaise of Sebaste.
- 319 Martyrdom of Theodore Stratelates ("the General"), under Licinius.
- 321 Constantine the Great introduced the first civil legislation declaring Sunday a holiday in honor of the Resurrection. (Note: He decreed that all work should cease on Sunday, except that farmers could work if necessary. This law, aimed at providing time for worship, was followed later in the same century and in subsequent centuries by further restrictions on Sunday activities.)
- c. 324 The Labarum with the "Chi-Rho" Christogram became the official standard of the Roman Empire, after the final encounter between Roman emperors Constantine I and Licinius at the Battle of Chrysopolis. (Note: "According to the 4th-century historian Eusebius, in his Life of Constantine, before the victory over Maxentius (312), Constantine saw a sign of the cross in the sky and the words "in this sign thou shalt conquer" and used it as a talisman in battle. Dating of the labarum is attested by coins issued at Constantinople (now Istanbul) after Constantine's victory over Licinius in 324.")

== Patriarchate of the Roman era (325–732) ==
=== Nicene era (325–451) ===
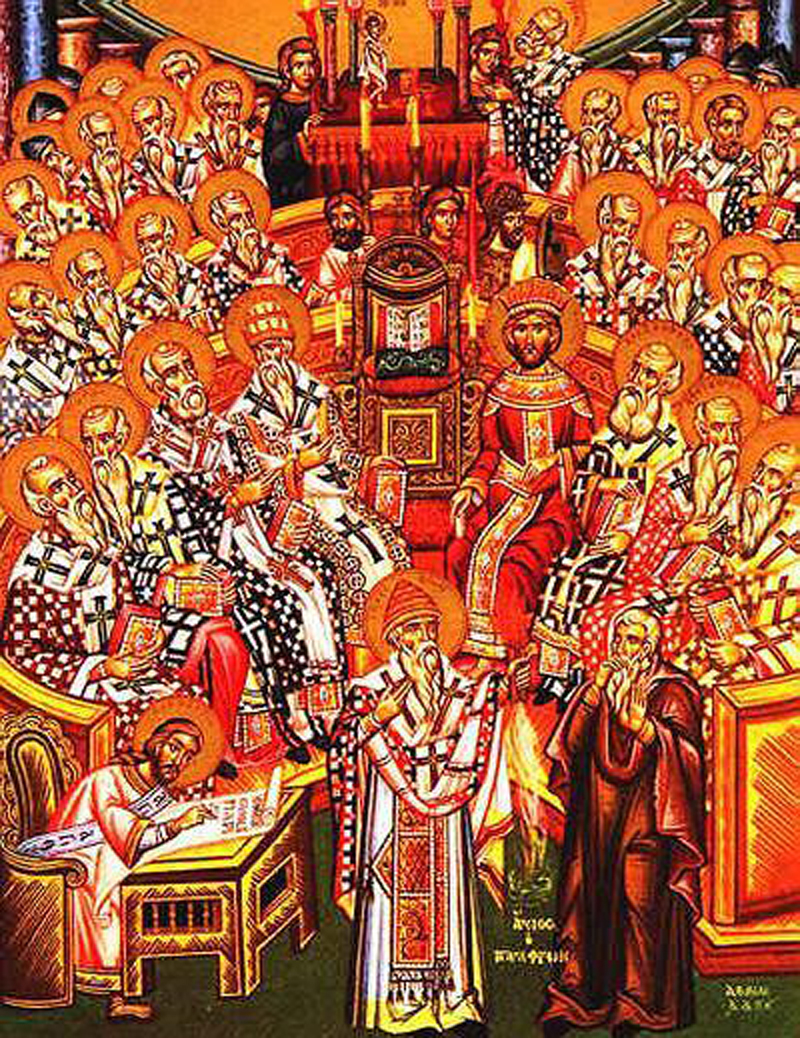
The First Ecumenical Council in Nicaea, AD 325.

- 325 First Ecumenical Council held in Nicea, condemning Arianism, setting the Paschalion, and issuing the first version of the Nicene Creed, also establishing the supremacy of honor of the Apostolic Sees as Rome, followed by Alexandria, Antioch, and Jerusalem.
- 326 Church of Panagia Ekatontapyliani (Hundred Doors) in Paros founded by St. Helen, during her pilgrimage to the Holy Land.

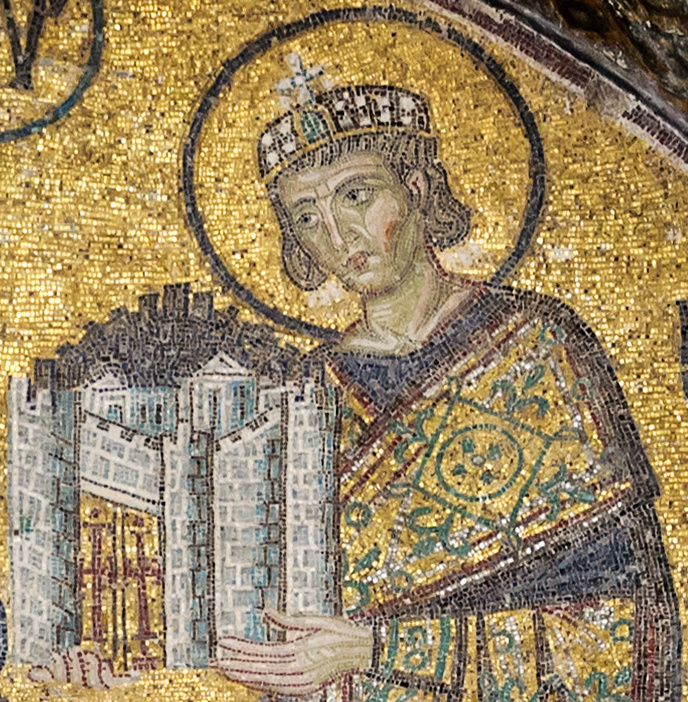
St. Constantine the Great, Equal-to-the-Apostles (†337).

- 330 Byzantium refounded as Constantinople / New Rome , Christian capital of the Roman Empire, and is dedicated to the Theotokos by Emperor Constantine. (Note: "The East Roman Empire was a fascinating blend of Hellenic Culture, Christian faith, and Roman principles of administration and law. Precisely when this blend passed into the style called Byzantine is a much argued point. The inception certainly was the building of Constantinople early in the 4th century. Yet as late as the reign of Justinian the language of the court was still officially Latin; Justinian himself directed the great compilation in Latin of the Corpis iuris civilis, the form in which later ages knew Roman law. Justnian, however, closed the pagan philosophical schools of Athens and abolished the consulate in 541 as a meaningless survival; from this period on, arts and letters entered ever more into the distinctive Byzantine world.")
- 333 Constantine commissions Eusebius, to prepare 50 copies of the Bible for churches in the new capital.
- 335 Building of the Protaton church at Karyes (Athos), dedicated to the Dormition of the Virgin Mary, oldest church on Mount Athos.
- 337 Under Constantine the Great Greece was part of the prefectures of Macedonia and Thrace; death of Constantine the Great, Equal-to-the-Apostles.
- c. 337 Death of Bishop Parthenios of Lampsacus.
- 340–570 Constantinople overtakes Rome as the largest city in the world by population.
- c. 342–343 Death of Nicholas of Myra.
- 346 Apparition of the Sign of the Cross over Jerusalem, in time of Patriarch Cyril, when a luminous Cross appeared over Jerusalem, stretching from Golgotha to the Mount of Olives. (Note: The First Appearance of the Cross occurred on October12, 312: Emperor Constantine the Great had a vision of the cross in broad daylight, with the inscription "En Touto Nika" ("In this sign you will conquer").; The Second Appearance of the Cross occurred on 7 May 346: View in Jerusalem in the time of Patriarch Cyril. All the people saw the Cross of divine light spreading from Golgotha to the Mount of Olives.; The Third Appearance of the Cross occurred on 14 September 1925: Appearance of the Sign of the Cross over the church of St. John the Theologian at Mount Hymettus in suburban Athens, on the eve of the feast of the Exaltation of the All-Honourable and Life-giving Cross.)

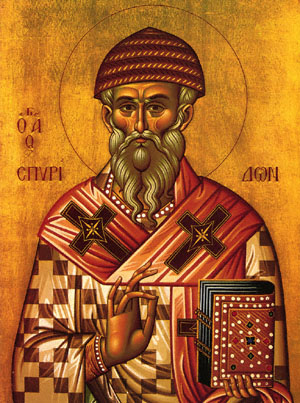
St. Spyridon, Bishop of Trimythous.

- 348 Death of Spyridon of Trimythous.
- c. 354 Emperor Constantius II sent the Arian bishop Theophilos the Indian on mission to south Asia via Arabia where he is said to have converted the Himyarites and built three churches in southwest Arabia; he is also said to have found Christians in India.
- 357 The Praetorian prefecture of Illyricum is formed when the three dioceses of Macedonia, Dacia and Pannonia were first grouped together by Constantius II.
- 358 Basil the Great founds monastery of Annesos in Pontus, the model for Eastern monasticism.
- 359 Councils of Seleucia in the east and Rimini in the west.
- 360 First church of Hagia Sophia inaugurated by Emperor Constantius II.
- 364 Council of Laodicea held.

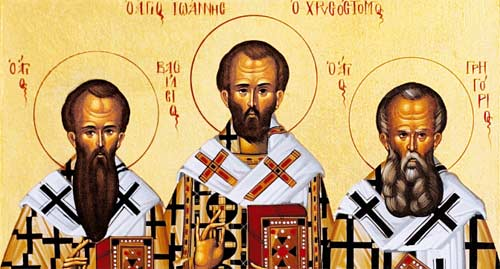
The Three Holy Hierarchs, Basil the Great (Basil of Caesarea), Gregory the Theologian (Gregory of Nazianzus) and John Chrysostom.

- c.368 Basil the Great codifies the ethical precepts of monastic life in his Asketika (sometimes mistranslated as Rules of St. Basil), thus remembered as a father of communal monasticism in Eastern Christianity. (Note: Basil established guidelines for monastic life which focus on community life, liturgical prayer, and manual labour. Together with Pachomius he is remembered as a father of communal monasticism in Eastern Christianity.)
- 375 Basil the Great writes On the Holy Spirit, confirming the divinity of the Holy Spirit.
- 377 Epiphanius of Salamis (Cyprus) writes Panarion (Πανάριον, "Medicine Chest"), also known as Adversus Haereses ("Against Heresies"), listing 80 heresies, some of which are not described in any other surviving documents from the time .
- 378 Visigoths defeat Emperor Valens at the Battle of Adrianople, permanently weakening northern borders of the empire.
- 379 Death of Basil the Great; the Cappadocian Fathers Basil the Great, Gregory of Nazianzus the Theologian, and Gregory of Nyssa set their mark on all subsequent history of the Greek churches, through Basil's On the Holy Spirit, and Rules; Gregory of Nazianzus' Five Theological Orations; and Gregory of Nyssa's polemical works against various heretical teachings.
- 380 Christianity established as the official faith of the Roman Empire by Emperor Theodosius the Great.

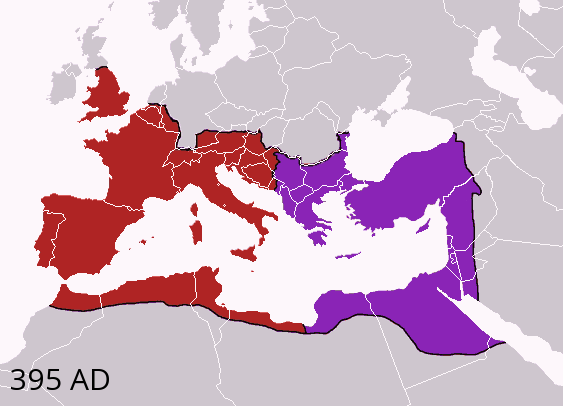
The division of the Empire after the death of Theodosius I, c. 395 AD superimposed on modern borders. Western Roman Empire Eastern Roman Empire

- 381 Second Ecumenical Council held in Constantinople, condemning Macedonianism/Pneumatomachianism and Appollinarianism, declaring the divinity of the Holy Spirit, confirming the previous Ecumenical Council, and completing the Nicene-Constantinopolitan Creed.
- 383 First monastic institution established in Constantinople at Psamathia, outside the city.
- 386 Panagia Soumela Monastery founded in Trebizond, Pontus, Asia Minor, after St. Luke's Icon of the Mother of God appears at Mt. Mela.
- 389 Death of Gregory the Theologian.
- 391-92 Closing of all non-Christian temples in the Empire; Theodosius the Great ends pagan Eleusinian Mysteries by decree. (Note: "Their secrecy notwithstanding, the mysteries of Eleusis are more extensively documented than any other single Greek cult...From the earliest testimony, the Eleusinian section of the Homeric Hymn to Demeter, to the proscription of the cult by Theodosius and the destruction of the sanctuary by the Goths about 400 AD [396 AD], we survey a period of a thousand years. During this time the cult drew men and women from all of Greece and later from the whole of the Roman Empire.")
- c. 394 Death of Gregory of Nyssa;
- 394 Epiphanius of Salamis (Cyprus) attacks teachings of Origen as heretical.

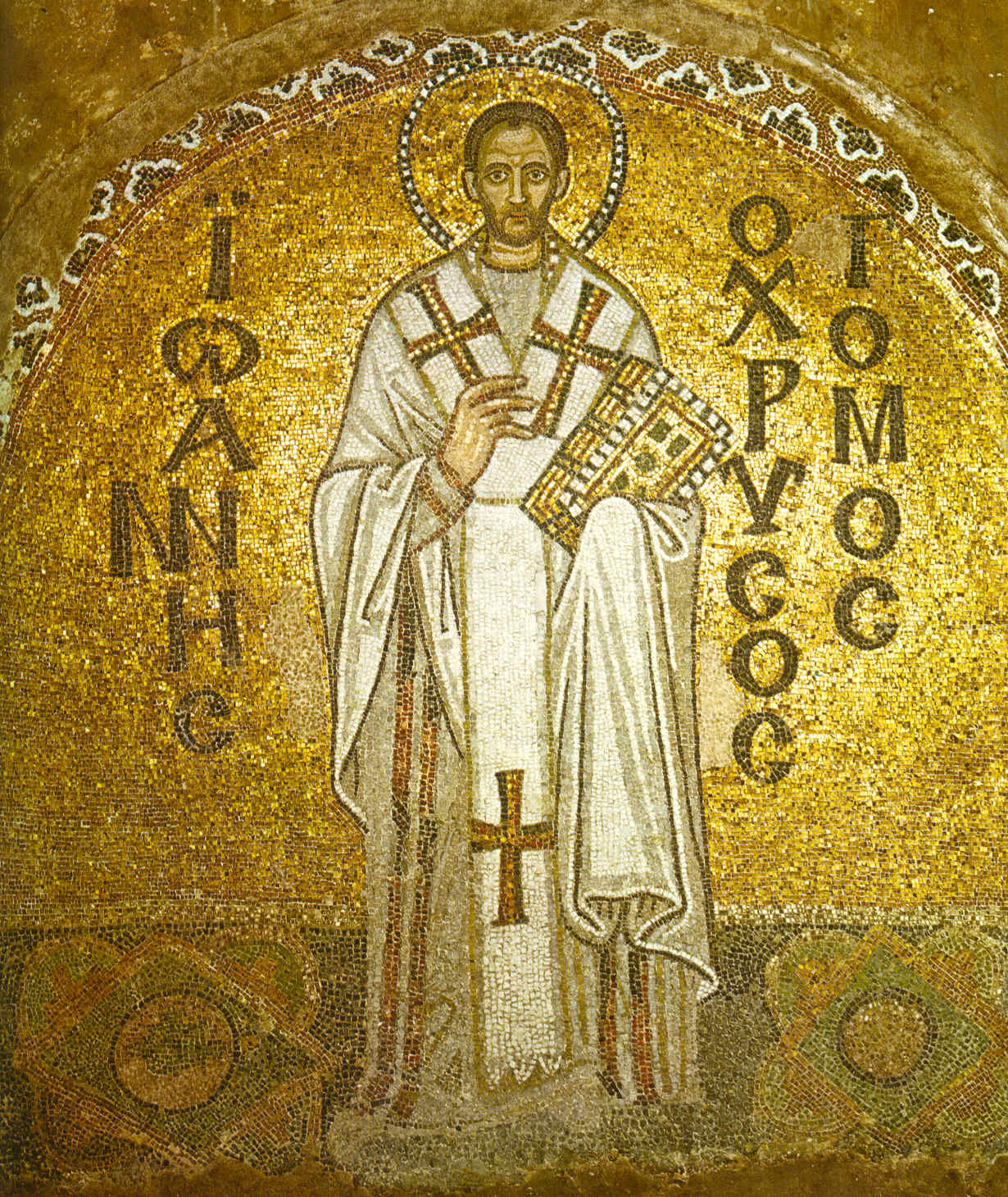
St. John Chrysostom, Abp. of Constantinople (398–404).

- 395 Re-division of Empire with death of Emperor Theodosius the Great, by which time Christianity was definitely the state religion; Theodosius I divided the prefecture of Macedonia into the provinces of Creta, Achaea, Thessalia, Epirus Vetus, Epirus Nova, and Macedonia; the Aegean islands formed the province of Insulae in the prefecture of Asiana; the placing of the cincture (sash) of the Most Holy Theotokos in the Church of the Virgin in Halkoprateia-Constantinople (395–408).
- 398 John Chrysostom becomes Abp. of Constantinople.
- 399 Death of Evagrius Ponticus, the first monk to write extensively on the spiritual life, recording and systematizing the oral teachings of the desert fathers, and influencing his students Palladius and John Cassian, Maximus the Confessor, Diadochos of Photiki, Isaac of Nineveh, Symeon the New Theologian, and Gregory Palamas, among others.

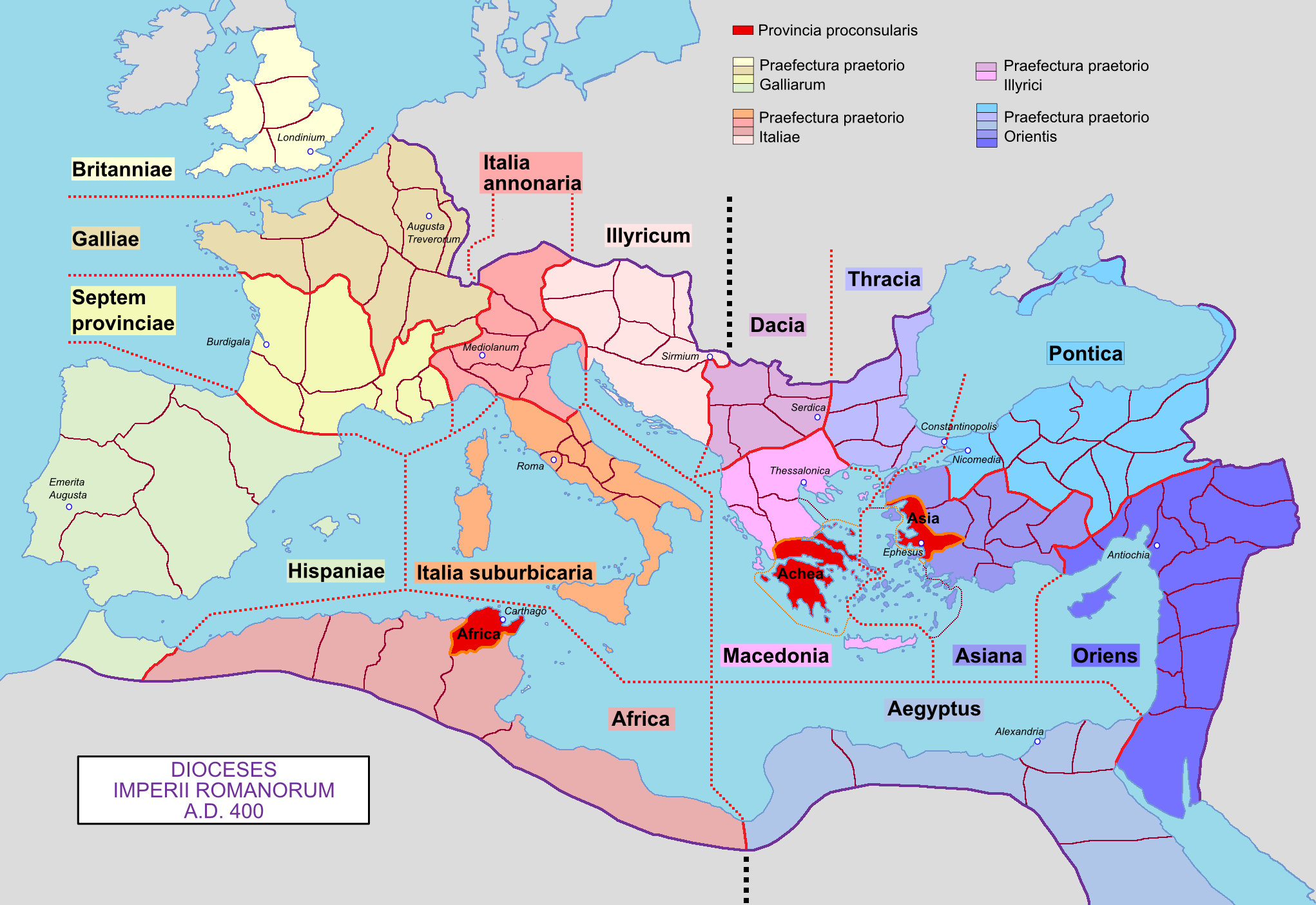
Map of the Roman Empire with its Dioceses, in 400 AD. The Prefecture of "Eastern Illyricum" (Illyricum Orientale) consisted of the Dioceses of Dacia and Macedonia.

- 403 Synod of the Oak held near Chalcedon, deposing and exiling John Chrysostom, whose principal opponent was Severian of Gabala, who served as prosecutor and judge of the patriarch.
- 407 Death of John Chrysostom in exile; erection of the Eudoxiana in Gaza, a large beautiful church with thirty-two large marble columns, (Note: The church was constructed directly upon the ruins of The Marneion, the temple sacred to Zeus Marnas, who was the local Hellenistic incarnation of Dagon. It was the last surviving great cult center of paganism, and was burned by order of the Roman emperor in 402 AD. After the Muslim conquest in the 7th century, the Church of St. Porphyrios (Eudoxiana) in Gaza City, founded as a Byzantine Church in 407 AD, was transformed into the Great Mosque of Gaza.) erected at the expense of Empress Eudoxia during the tenure of Bp. Porphyrios of Gaza, and dedicated on Pascha (14 April), 407 AD. (Note: (in Greek) "Κατάφερε δὲ ὁ Ἅγιος τὰ κατεδαφιστεῖ τὸ Μαρνεῖον, ὁ περίφημος ναὸς τῶν Ἐθνικῶν Γαζαίων, ποὺ εἶχε ἱδρυθεῖ ἀπὸ τὸν αὐτοκράτορα Ἀδριανὸ τὸ ἔτος 129 μ.Χ. Στὴν θέση του ἀνοικοδομήθηκε περικαλλὴς ναὸς μὲ χορηγία τῆς αὐτοκράτειρας Εὐδοξίας, ἡ ὁποία ἀπέστειλε γιὰ τὸν σκοπὸ αὐτὸ στὴν Γάζα τὸν Ἀντιοχέα ἀρχιτέκτονα Ρουφίνο. Ὁ ναὸς αὐτός, ποὺ ὀνομάστηκε Εὐδοξιανός, εἶχε 32 μεγάλους κίονες ἀπὸ καρυστινὸ μάρμαρο καὶ τὰ ἐγκαίνιά του ἔγιναν τὸ Πάσχα τοῦ 407 μ.Χ.")
- 411 Death of Alexios the Man of God, Fool-for-Christ.
- 420 Death of Bp. Porphyrios of Gaza, known for Christianizing the recalcitrant pagan city of Gaza and having its temples demolished.
- 421 Emperor of the east Theodosius II declares war on Persia when Persia begins persecuting Christians; the persecution lasts until 457.
- 425 University of Constantinople founded as the first university in the world.
- 426 Euthymius the Great establishes lavra in Palestinian desert, consecrated in 428 by Bp. Juvenal of Jerusalem; Synod held in Constantinople against the Messalians.
- 431 Third Ecumenical Council held in Ephesus, condemning Nestorianism and Pelagianism, confirming the use of the term Theotokos to refer to the Virgin Mary, and confirming autocephaly of Church of Cyprus.
- 437 Seven Sleepers of Ephesus awakened to prove resurrection of the dead. (Note: (in Greek): "Μετὰ 194 χρόνια, ἐπὶ Θεοδοσίου τοῦ Μικροῦ, στὴν Ἔφεσο κάποια αἵρεση διακήρυττε ὅτι δὲν ὑπάρχει ἀνάσταση νεκρῶν. Ἐκείνη, λοιπόν, τὴν ἐποχή, κάποιο παιδὶ στὴν ἀγορὰ τῆς Ἐφέσου ψώνισε ψωμὶ μὲ τὸ νόμισμα τῆς ἐποχῆς τοῦ Δεκίου. Αὐτὸ προκάλεσε ἔκπληξη. Πῆραν, λοιπὸν τὸ παιδὶ καὶ τὸ ἀνέκριναν. Κατόπιν, πῆγαν στὴ σπηλιὰ καὶ βρῆκαν ζωντανὰ καὶ τὰ ὑπόλοιπα παιδιά.")
- 438 Codex Theodosianus published; relics of John Chrysostom brought to Constantinople and buried in the Church of the Holy Apostles.
- 447 Earthquake in Constantinople, when a boy was lifted up to heaven and heard the Trisagion; Pope Leo I wrote to the bishops of Sicily, rebuking them for permitting baptism at Epiphany, as the Greeks did, and ordering them to observe the Roman custom of baptizing on Easter and Whitsunday.
- 449 Robber Synod of Ephesus, presided over by Dioscorus of Alexandria, with an order from the emperor to acquit Eutyches the Monophysite.
- c. 450 Revelation of the Life-Giving Font of the Mother of God, in Valoukli, Constantinople, to a soldier named Leo Marcellus (who would later become Byzantine Emperor Leo I (457–474), becoming one of the most important pilgrimage sites in Greek Orthodoxy.

=== Early Byzantine era (451–843) ===
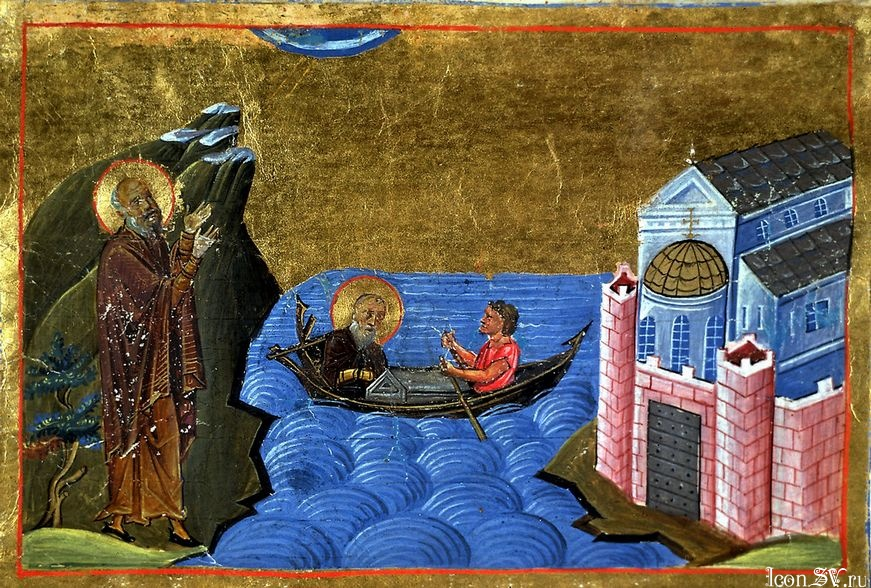
Byzantine miniature depicting the Stoudios Monastery and the Propontis (Sea of Marmara).

- 451 Fourth Ecumenical Council meets at Chalcedon, condemning Eutychianism and Monophysitism, affirming doctrine of two perfect and indivisible but distinct natures in Christ, and recognizing Church of Jerusalem as patriarchate.
- 452 Second finding of the Head of John the Forerunner, at Emesa.
- 457 First coronation of Byzantine Emperor by patriarch of Constantinople; Proterius of Alexandria is lynched by an Alexandrian mob; rejecting the Christological definitions of Chalcedon, the Egyptian or Coptic church goes its own way, becoming one of the Oriental Orthodox Churches. (Note: "Mobs in Alexandria lynch Proterius, a Byzantine Chalcedonian, who had been imposed upon them. They elect Timothy Aelurus. Rejecting the christological definitions of Chalcedon, the Egyptian, or Coptic, church, goes its own way, becoming one of the Oriental Orthodox churches. Small groups of Christians in Egypt and Syria, known as Melkites, do accept the Definition of Chalcedon. The division is generally linguistic. From this time also, the Syrian church begins the hardening of lines between the Monophysitism of West Syrians and the sympathizers of Nestorius among East Syrians.")
- 458 Death of Bp. Theodoret of Cyrrhus, influential author and theologian who played a pivotal role in many early Byzantine church controversies.
- 462 Indiction moved to 1 September; Studion Monastery founded.

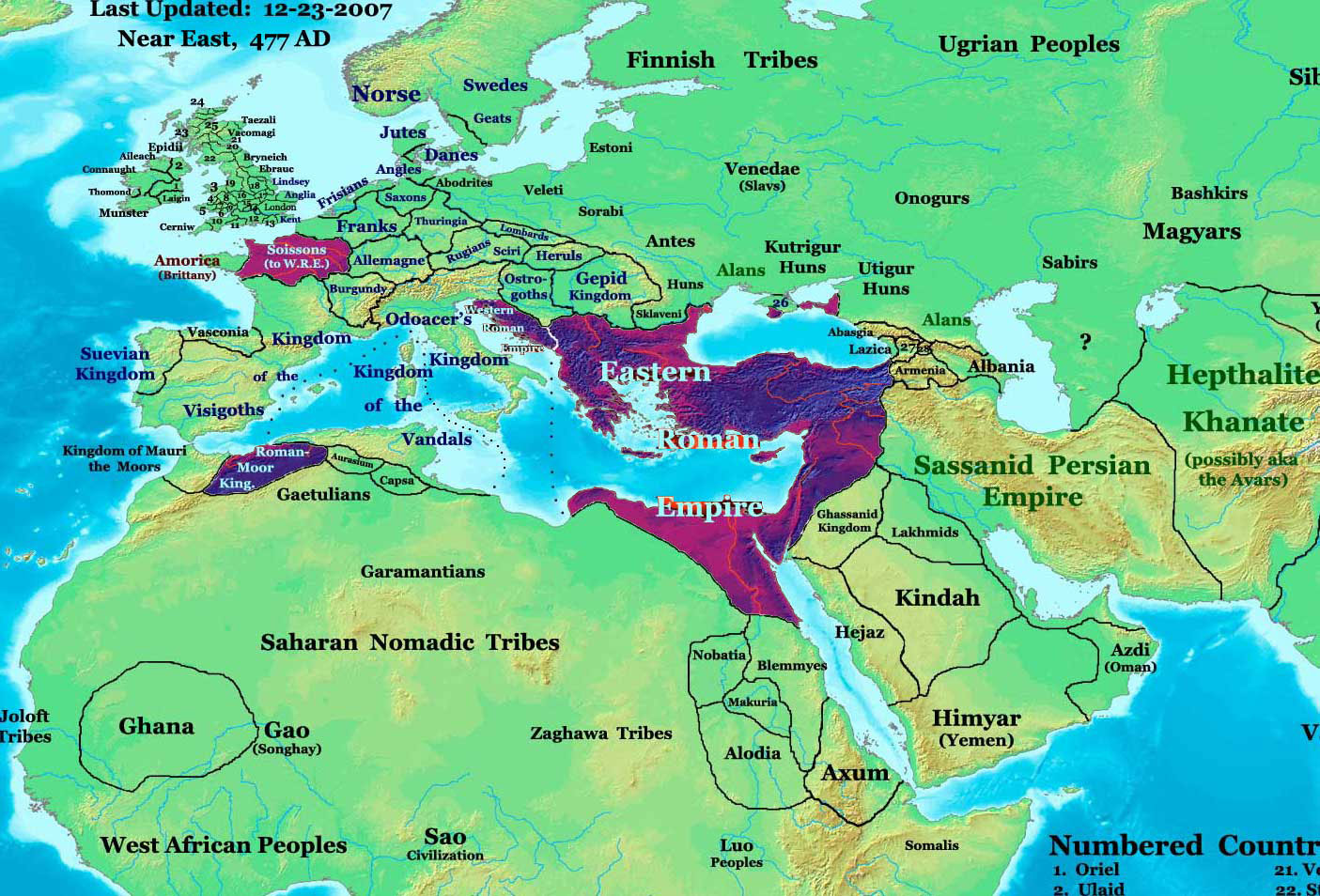
Eastern Roman Empire c. 477, showing the extent of Koine Greek.

- 463 Death of Patapius of Thebes. (Note: "PATAPIUS, solitary of Constantinople, native of Thebes, the subject of three homilies written upon him by ANDREAS CRETENSIS. He lived before the 8th century: his feast is 8 Dec..")
- c. 471 Patr. Acacius of Constantinople was first called "Oikoumenikos" (Ecumenical).
- 476 Fall of the Western Roman Empire as Romulus Augustulus, the last Western Roman emperor, is deposed by the German Odoacer, leaving the emperor in the Greek East as the sole imperial authority, and an unstable political environment in the West where the Church of Rome slowly developed a centralized structure, concentrating religious as well as secular authority in the office of the Pope, the Bishop of Rome. (Note: After the fall of the Western Empire, the terms "Greek East" and "Latin West" are applied to areas that were formerly part of the Eastern or Western Empires, and also to areas that fell under the Greek or Latin cultural sphere but which had never been part of the Roman Empire. In this sense, particular attention is given to differences in Christianity in the two parts, specifically between Western Christianity and Eastern Christianity.)
- 484 Acacian Schism.
- 493 Death of Daniel the Stylite an ascetic who lived for 33 years on a pillar near the city of Constantinople.
- c. 500 Zosimus, pagan Greek historian writes Historia Nova ("New History"), a history of the Roman Empire to 410 AD, with an anti-Christian view offering a different interpretation to church affairs than from Christian sources; Pseudo-Dionysius the Areopagite's writing corpus including the Divine Names, Mystical Theology, Celestial Hierarchy, and Ecclesiastical Hierarchy influences the development of Byzantine mystical spirituality and hesychasm through Maximus the Confessor, Symeon the New Theologian, and Gregory Palamas.
- 502 Start of Byzantine-Sassanid Wars, lasting until 562.
- 518 Patriarch John II of Constantinople is addressed as "Oikoumenikos Patriarches" (Ecumenical Patriarch); the Byzantine government begins persecution of non-Chalcedonians in the east, especially in Mesopotamia.

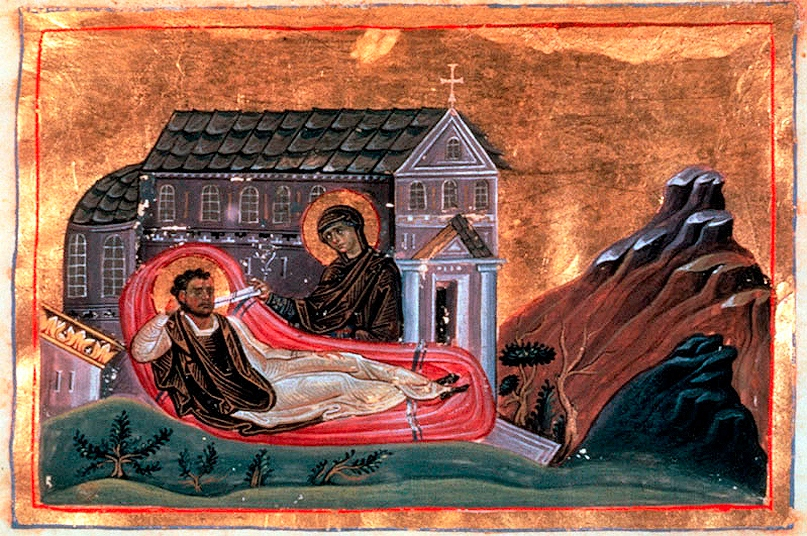
St. Romanos' vision of the Virgin Mary.

- 519 Eastern and Western churches reconciled with end of Acacian Schism.

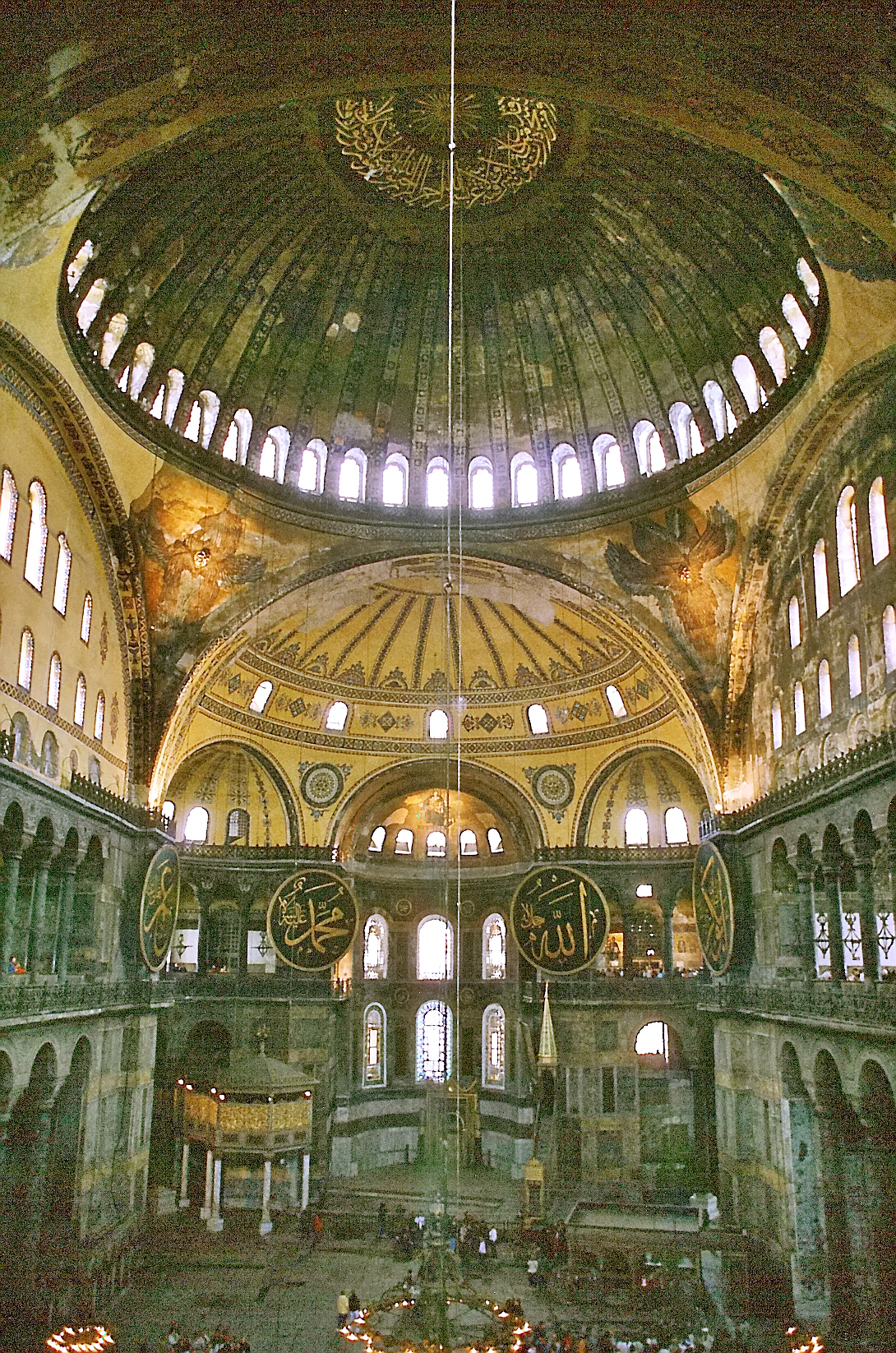
An interior view of Hagia Sophia today.

- 520 Romanus the Melodist the greatest hymnographer, develops the Kontakion, a chanted verse sermon, to perfection; influenced by Ephrem the Syrian, he in turn influences Andrew of Crete.
- 529 Emperor Justinian closes the School of Athens, which Plato had founded in 387 BC. (Note: "In Greece the Justinian era forms the decisive break. In 529 A.D. Justinian prohibited instruction under heathen teachers, deprived the professors of the old religion of their income, and confiscated the endowed wealth belonging to the University of Athens. With this gesture he drew the line under the history of education for an entire millennium.")
- 529–534 Justinian's Corpus Juris Civilis issued, first comprehensive legal code in history of Roman Empire; Justinian's Novella 131 formulated the proposed government of universal Christendom by five patriarchal sees under the auspices of a single universal empire (Pentarchy).
- 532 Justinian the Great orders building of Hagia Sophia.
- 533 Malta becomes part of the Byzantine Empire, being incorporated into the Byzantine province of Sicily for 337 years (533–870).
- 537 Construction of Hagia Sophia in Constantinople completed; Justinian decrees that all dates must include the Indiction.
- 537–752 Byzantine Papacy. (Note: "From 678 to 752, or until after Ravenna had fallen before the Lombards, out of thirteen popes, eleven were orientals... ...in the later seventh and early eighth centuries the Orientals actually formed a majority of the Roman clergy and presumably of the more influential laity as well – a thesis which seems amply substantiated by the remains of the Rome of that period.")
- 538 Emperor Justinian the Great, via deportations and force, manages to get all five patriarchates officially into communion.
- c. 540 Death of Osios David of Thessaloniki.
- 540 Bulgar raids into Illyricum and northern Greece.
- 543 Doctrine of apokatastasis condemned by Synod of Constantinople; Justinian the Great sends missionaries to Nubia (the three kingdoms of Nobatia/Novatia, Alodia/Alwa, and Makuria).
- 544 According to tradition the Mandylion of Edessa destroys Persian siege works.

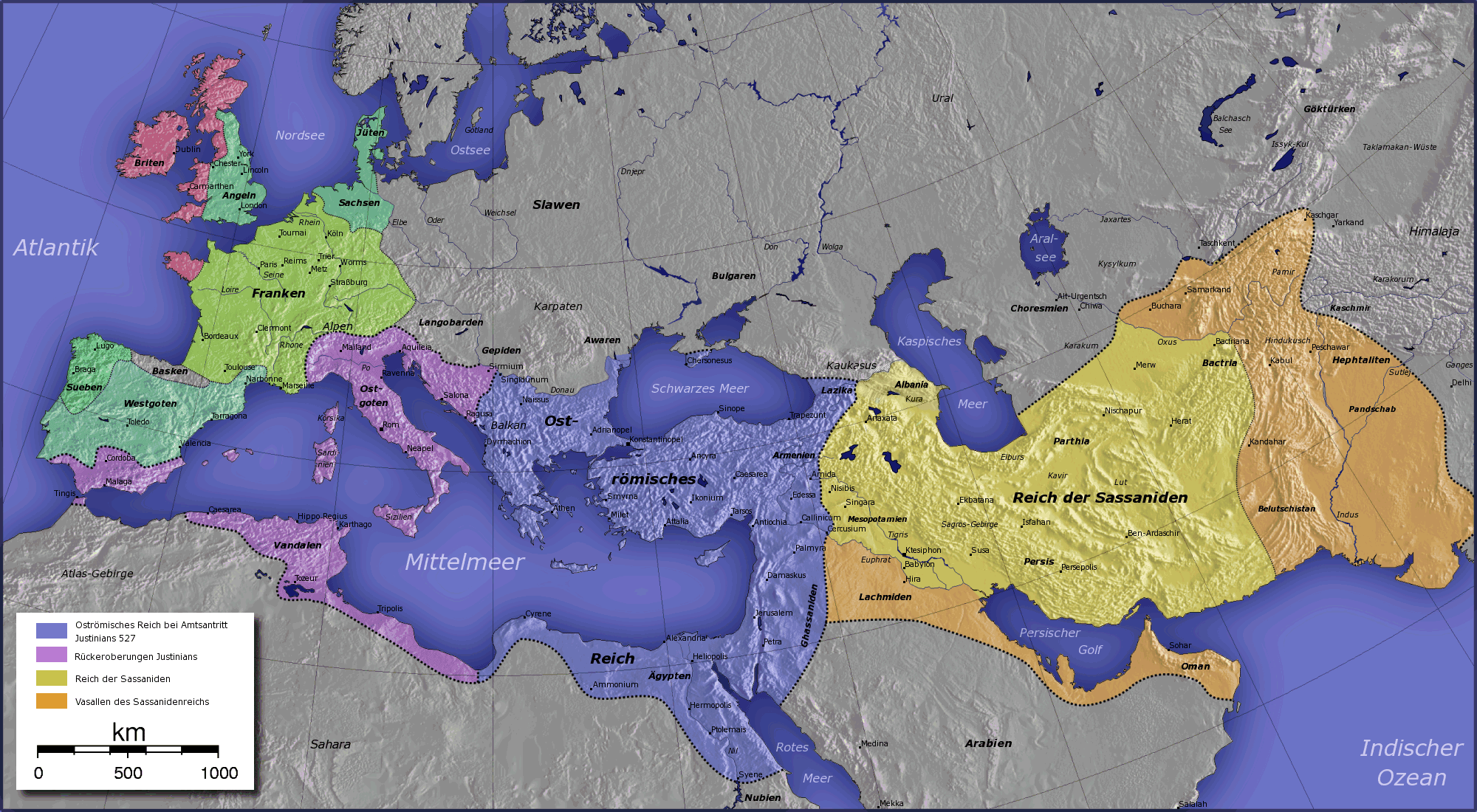
The Byzantine Empire during its greatest territorial extent under Justinian. c. 550.

- 552 Death of Gregentios of Himyaritia, (Note: Also known as: Gregentios of Taphar; Gregentios of Ethiopia; Gregentius of Himyar; Gregentius Tephrensis; Grigentius of Omir; Gregory of Omiritia; or Gregory of Omirits.) missionary Bishop of Himyaritia (Homer, Omirits, in Southern Arabia) for over thirty years, when the area was under Aksumite control, playing an important role in the restoration of Orthodox Christianity there after the persecution of Dunaan (Dhû Nuwâs).
- 553 Fifth Ecumenical Council held in Constantinople in an attempt to reconcile Chalcedonians with non-Chalcedonians–the Three Chapters of Theodore of Mopsuestia, Theodoret of Cyrrhus, and Ibas of Edessa are condemned for their Nestorianism, and Origen and his writings are also condemned; Ostrogoth kingdom in Italy conquered by the Byzantine Empire after the Battle of Mons Lactarius; the first evidence for a bishop on Malta dates from 553.
- 556 Completion of Justinian the Great's fortification of Saint Catherine's Monastery; a chapel and anchorites had already been there at least since the 4th century when Egeria visited in c. 385. death of Cyriacus the Anchorite.
- 562 Isidorus of Miletus completes repair on dome of Hagia Sophia, now higher by 20 feet than the Anthemian original; re-consecration of Hagia Sophia in Constantinople by Patriarch Eutychius (23 December).
- 565-566 Completion of the mosaic of the Transfiguration in apse of the Church of the Mother of God on Mt. Sinai.
- 565-78 The Cherubic Hymn was added to the Divine Liturgy by Emperor Justin II.
- 566 Bp. Longinus sent from Constantinople to Nubia as missionary.
- 568 Exarchate of Ravenna established, to 752, a Greek imperial outpost and place of contact with the Latin West.
- 575 The Chronographia (Χρονογραφία) of John Malalas in 18 books, chronicles the years from creation to 563 AD.
- 576 Dual hierarchy henceforth in Alexandria, Chalcedonian (Greek) and Monophysite (Coptic).
- 577 Patr. John III Scholasticus is responsible for the first collection of Canon Law, the Nomocanon, of the Eastern Orthodox Church.
- 580 Serious invasion of Slavs migrating into the Balkans and Greece; last recorded persecution of pagans in Byzantine Empire.
- 582 Persecution of Monophysites renewed under emperor Maurice.
- 586 St. Demetrios of Thessaloniki saves Thessaloniki from Avar-Slav siege. (Note: Thessalonica, the most important city in the Balkans except for the imperial capital, Constantinople, was besieged by the Avars and their Slavic auxiliaries for seven days, as described in the Miracles of Saint Demetrius, a collection of miracles attributed to the city's patron saint in two books, one written c. 610 and the other around 680. "Like Sophronius and other writers from this period, John (Archbishop John of Thessaloniki, who composed his collection of Miracula in the 7th century) underscored the effectiveness of the saint's intercession by demonstrating the primacy of Demetrius' prayers over the activities of the angels. When, for example, during the Avar-Slav siege of September 586, the city was about to fall, John related that a high-ranking civilian dreamt that he saw two angels dressed as imperial guardsmen enter Demetrius' shrine and demand that he quit the city because God had ordered Thessalonica's destruction. But the saint resisted, telling the angels that the city's fate would be his: either God would relent when he heard the Saint's prayers, or he would 'perish' with the city. Shortly thereafter the city was saved and the efficacy of Demetrius' intercessions manifested. Indeed, the man who had the dream was certain that it was Demetrius who had saved the city because the figure he saw in the vision matched exactly 'the form in which he is represented in his ancient images'.")
- c. 590 Parthenon in Athens converted into a Christian church dedicated to Agia Sophia. (Note: "Some modern writers maintain that the Parthenon was converted into a Christian sanctuary during the reign of Justinian (527–65)...But there is no evidence to support this in the ancient sources. The existing evidence suggests that the Parthenon was converted into a Christian basilica in the last decade of the sixth century.")
- 594 Evagrius Scholasticus writes Ecclesiastical History, covering the years 431 to 594 AD.
- 602 Final series of wars between Byzantine Empire and Sassanid Empire.
- 610 Heraclius changes official language of the Empire from Latin to Greek, already the lingua franca of the vast majority of the population.
- c. 611 Andreas of Caesarea, Bp. of Caesarea in Cappadocia, writes the first Greek Patristic commentary on the Book of Revelation.

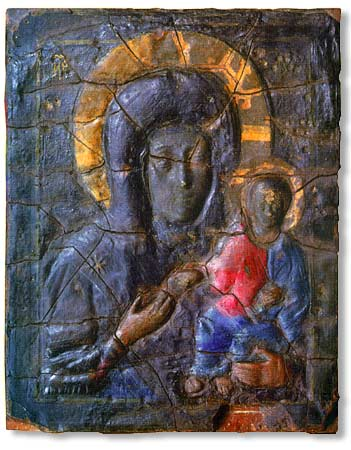
The Holy Virgin Blachernitissa, divine protectress of the Byzantine Empire (7th century).

- 612 Holy Sponge and Holy Lance brought to Constantinople from Palestine.
- 617 Persian Army conquers Chalcedon after a long siege.
- 620 Slavs attack Thessaloniki.
- 626 Akathist Hymn (Chairetismoi) to the Virgin Mary written, after Constantinople liberated from a siege of 80,000 Avars, Slavs and the Persian fleet. (Note: According to various scholars, the Hymn is the product of other sieges of Constantinople that took place on later dates: at 860 by the Russians, 820 by the Slovaks, or at 671 and 717–718 by the Moslems. Still others relate it to the "Revolt of Nicas" in 539. Most scholars, however, place the Hymn on the victory of August 626 against the Persians. And since Patriarch Sergios’ name is closely associated with it, many researchers believe that he was the author of the Hymn. The Akathist Hymn (which in its present form was added to by many Ecclesiastical Hymnographers), existed for the most part even before it was formally accepted by the Church in 626 AD.)
- 627 Emperor Heraclius decisively defeats Sassanid Persians at Battle of Nineveh, recovering True Cross and breaking power of the Sassanid dynasty.
- 630 Second Elevation of the Holy Cross, on 21 March 630 AD, when Emperor Heraclius entered Jerusalem amidst great rejoicing, and together with Patriarch Zacharios (609–633), transferred the Cross of Christ with great solemnity into the temple of the Resurrection; it is the only time a Byzantine emperor sets foot in the Holy Land.
- 632 Christian influences on Islamic practice include veiling of women, hospitality for monastic travellers, prostrations, facing east for prayer, fixed hours for daily office of prayer, ritual ablutions before worship.
- 633 Death of Patr. Modestus of Jerusalem, who had restored many buildings after the Persian sack of 614, including the Rotunda of the Anastasis.
- 634 Emperor Heraclius issues edict ordering all Jews to be baptized; many Jews flee to protection of Persians or Muslim Arabs.
- 639 Death of Patr. Sophronius I of Jerusalem, whose poetry and prayers become part of the Liturgy, including the Troparia of the Royal Hours chanted on Great Friday and the eves of the Nativity and Theophany, and the main prayer of Great Blessing of Water on Theophany.
- 641 St. Christopher of Trebizond heads the Monastery of Panagia Soumela.(641–668).
- 646 Alexandria recaptured by Muslim Arabs after a Byzantine attempt to retake Egypt fails, ending nearly ten centuries of Greco-Roman civilization in Egypt; the monophysite Coptic patriarch Benjamin I and his followers willingly accept Arab rule, preferring it to the Byzantines; Maximus the Confessor takes lead in opposing Monothelitism.
- 648 Pope Theodore I of Rome excommunicates patriarch Paul II of Constantinople.
- 649 Arabs invade and conquer Cyprus; the Lateran Council of 649 in Rome definitively condemned Monothelitism, being attended by 105 bishops, of which all but one were from the western portion of the Byzantine Empire. (Note: One-fourth of the bishops were (as indicated by their names) likely of Eastern ethnicity or origin and thus probably Greek-speaking.)

Byzantine Empire by 650; by this year it lost all of its southern provinces except the Exarchate of Carthage.

- c. 650 Sicily was flooded with an influx of Greek-speaking refugees from the East, both lay and clerical, from Syria and Egypt, due to a series of convulsions including the Persian invasion of 614, the Muslim conquest of the Levant (634–638), and Emperor Heraclius' persecution of any who spoke out against Monothelitism. (Note: "From 614 onward the Levant suffered a series of fearful convulsions any one of which would have forced thousands of refugees across the sea. The first disaster was the Persian invasion under Khusrau II... ...the migration to the Occident in the seventh century seems to have included almost no Coptic or Syriac speaking refugees; it was a purely Hellenic movement... ...Mohammedan histories show that a large proportion of the Greeks left the conquered regions, but it is difficult to distinguish the refugees in the Occident who retreated before the armies of Islam, from those who had previously sought safety from the Persians, and the persecution of Heraclius.")
- 650 The Patriarchate of Constantinople counted 32 metropoles, or capitals of ecclesiastical provinces, 1 autocephalous metropolis, 34 autocephalous archbishoprics, and 352 bishoprics–a grand total of 419 dioceses.
- 654 Invasion of Rhodes by Arabs.
- 662 Parthenon in Athens rededicated in honour of the Mother of God as "Panagia Atheniotissa" (Panagia of Athens), becoming the fourth most important pilgrimage site in the Eastern Roman Empire after Constantinople, Ephesus and Thessalonica; death of Maximus the Confessor.
- 663-668 Syracuse became the imperial seat of Emperor Constans II, and passed to the Greek Rite becoming the Metropolis of the whole Sicilian Orthodox Church.
- 669-78 First Arab siege of Constantinople; at Battle of Syllaeum Arab fleet destroyed by Byzantines through use of Greek Fire, ending immediate Arab threat to eastern Europe.
- 680–681 Sixth Ecumenical Council held in Constantinople, condemning Monothelitism and affirming Christology of Maximus the Confessor, affirming that Christ has both a human will and a divine will; Patr. Sergius of Constantinople and Pope Honorius of Rome are both explicitly anathematized for their support of Monothelitism.

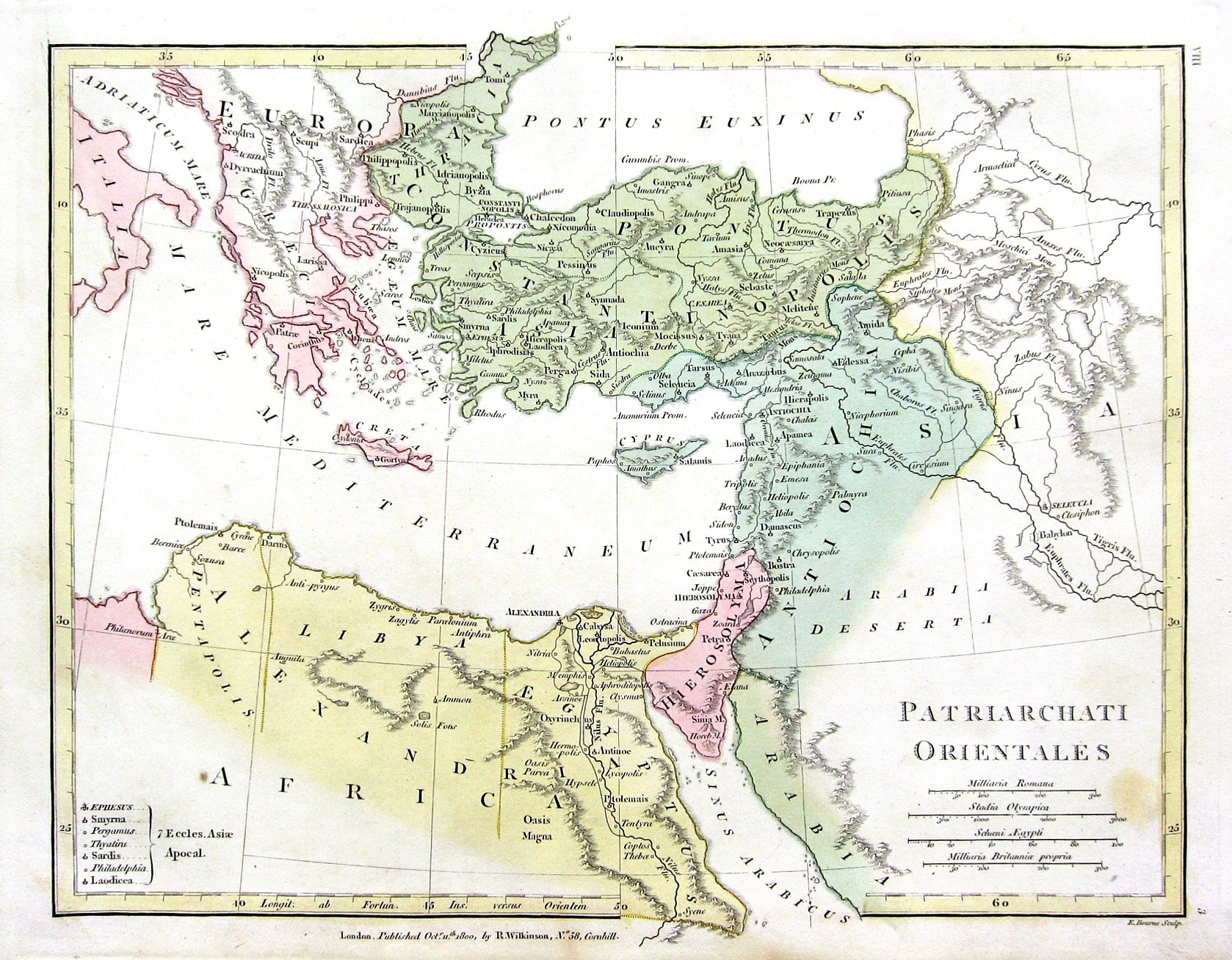
Map of Justinian's Pentarchy, with almost all of modern Greece under Rome.

- 685 First monastics come to Mount Athos; emperor Justinian II is the first emperor to have the figure of the Lord Jesus Christ stamped on a coin. (Note: The first portrait of Christ to appear on a coin may be on a gold solidus of Flavius Valerius Marcianus, a senator who came to rule the Eastern Roman, or Byzantine, Empire from A.D. 450–457. The coin appears to depict Christ bestowing a blessing on the Emperor of the East and his Empress, Aelia Pulcheria. But such images of Christ were far from popular until many years later.)
- 688 Emperor Justinian II and Caliph Abd al-Malik sign treaty neutralizing Cyprus.
- 692 The "Pentarchy" form of government of universal Christendom by five patriarchal sees received formal ecclesiastical sanction at the Council in Trullo, held in Constantinople, which ranked the five sees as Rome, Constantinople, Alexandria, Antioch, and Jerusalem;

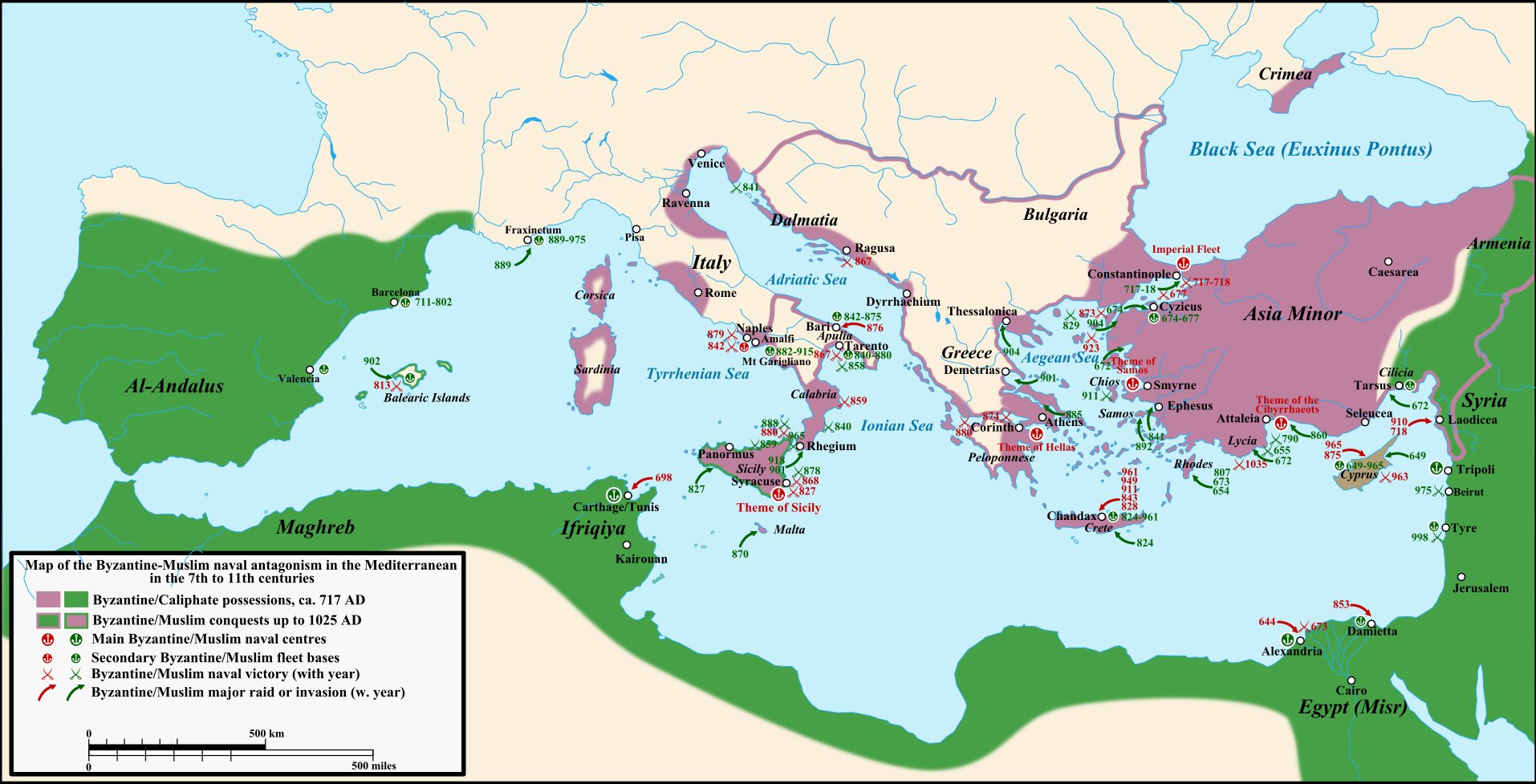
Byzantine-Arab naval struggles, c. AD 717–1025.

- 705 Long period of fighting begins between Trebizond in eastern Asia Minor and the Arabs.
- 706 Greek replaced by Arabic as administrative language in Egypt.
- 707 Byzantines lose Balearic Islands to Moors;
- 710 Pope Constantine makes last papal visit to Constantinople before 1967.
- 712 Death of Andrew of Crete, bishop, theologian, homilist, and hymnographer. (Note: A list of forty of his discourses, together with twenty-one edited sermons, is given in Patrologia Graeca, XCVII, 801-1304.)

== See also ==
- Eastern Orthodoxy in Greece
- Early centers of Christianity
- List of archbishops of Athens
- Greek Orthodox Church
- Eastern Orthodox Church organization

History

- History of the Eastern Orthodox Church
- History of Eastern Christianity
- History of the Eastern Orthodox Church under the Ottoman Empire
- History of Eastern Orthodox Churches in the 20th century
- Timeline of Eastern Orthodoxy in America

Church Fathers

- Apostolic Fathers
- Church Fathers
- Ante-Nicene Fathers (book)
- Desert Fathers
- Nicene and Post-Nicene Fathers
- List of Church Fathers

== Bibliography ==
- Rev. Dr. Veselin Kesich. Formation and Struggles: The Birth of the Church AD 33-200. The Church in History Vol. I: Part I. Crestwood, N.Y. : St. Vladimirs Seminary Press, 2007. ISBN 9780881413199
- Meyendorff, John (1989). Imperial unity and Christian divisions: The Church 450-680 A.D. The Church in history. Vol. 2. Crestwood, NY: St. Vladimir's Seminary Press. ISBN 978-0-88-141056-3.
- Dr. Larry W. Hurtado. Lord Jesus Christ: Devotion to Jesus in Earliest Christianity. Wm. B. Eerdmans Publishing, 2005. ISBN 9780802831675
- Liebeschuetz, John Hugo Wolfgang Gideon. Barbarians and Bishops: Army, Church, and State in the Age of Arcadius and Chrysostom. Clarendon Press, 1990. ISBN 0-19-814886-0
- Prof. Fergus Millar. A Greek Roman Empire: Power and Belief under Theodosius II (408–450). University of California Press, 2007.
- Yannis Papadogiannakis. Christianity and Hellenism in the Fifth-Century Greek East: Theodoret's Apologetics against the Greeks in Context. Center for Hellenic Studies. 2013. 194 pp. ISBN 978-0674060678
- Steven Runciman. The Byzantine Theocracy. Cambridge University Press, 2004.
- John Meyendorff. The Byzantine Legacy in the Orthodox Church. Crestwood, N.Y. : St. Vladimirs Seminary Press, 1982.
- John Meyendorff. Byzantine Theology: Historical Trends and Doctrinal Themes. 2nd ed. Fordham Univ Press, 1979.
- Timothy S. Miller. Medieval Byzantine Christianity. Ed. by Derek Krueger. A People's History of Christianity, Vol. 3. Minneapolis, Fortress Press. 2006. pp. 252.
- Dimitri Obolensky. The Byzantine Commonwealth: Eastern Europe, 500–1453. New York, NY: Praeger Publishers Inc., 1971.
- Donald Nicol. Church and Society in Byzantium. Cambridge University Press, 2008.
- Fr. Robert F. Taft (S.J.), Patriarch Athenagoras Orthodox Institute. Through Their Own Eyes: Liturgy as the Byzantines Saw It. InterOrthodox Press, 2006. 172pp.
- (in German) Ferdinand Gregorovius. Geschichte der Stadt Athen im Mittelalter. Von der Zeit Justinians bis zur türkischen Eroberung. Stuttgart, 1889.

- ("History of Athens in the Middle Ages. From Justinian to the Turkish Conquest." 1889.)

- Prof. Anthony Kaldellis. A Heretical (Orthodox) History of the Parthenon. Department of Greek and Latin, The Ohio State University. 01/02/2007. (.pdf)
- Rev. Dr. Andrew Louth and Dr. Augustine Casiday (Eds.). Byzantine Orthodoxies: Papers from the Thirty-Sixth Spring Symposium of Byzantine Studies, University of Durham, 23–25 March 2002. Society for the Promotion of Byzantine Studies, Volume 12. Ashgate Publishing, Ltd., 2006.
