= Paul and Juliana =

Saints Paul and Juliana
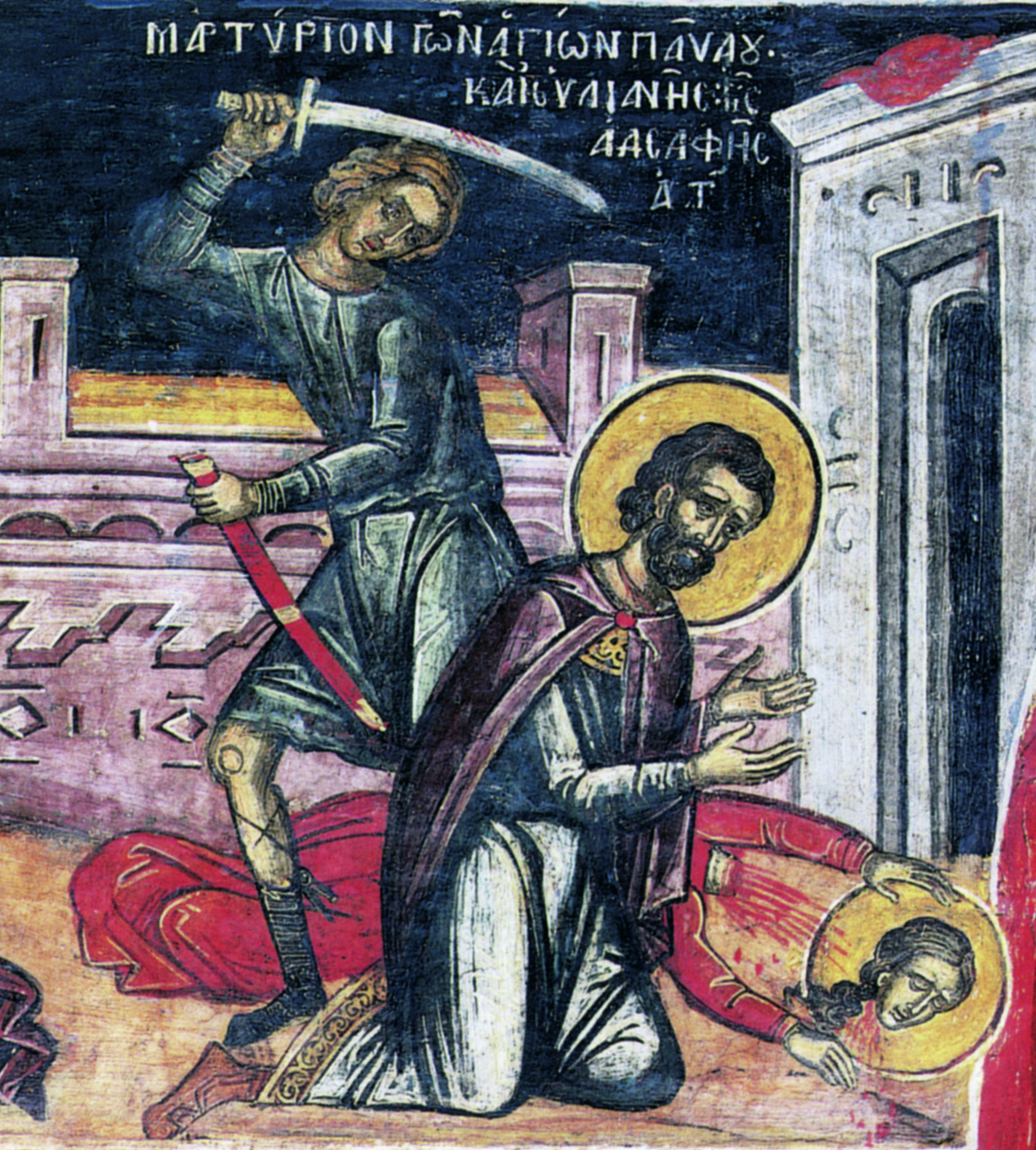

Martyrs
- Died: ca. 270; Ptolemais, Palestine
- Venerated in: Roman Catholic Church; Eastern Orthodox Church
- Canonized: Pre-Congregation
- Feast: 17 August

Paul and Juliana were brother and sister who suffered martyrdom, at the hands of Aurelian, in 270.

Juliana is one of the 140 Colonnade saints which adorn St. Peter's Square.

The Holy Martyrs Paul and his sister Juliania were executed under the emperor Aurelian 273 in the Phoenician city of Ptolemaida. One time the emperor had occasion to journey to Ptolemaida. Among those meeting him was Paul, who signed himself with the Sign of the Cross, and this was noticed. They arrested him and threw him in prison. On the following day, when they brought him to trial, he openly and boldly confessed his faith in Christ, for which he was subjected to fierce tortures. Juliania, seeing the suffering of her brother, began in front of everyone to denounce the emperor for his injustice and cruelty, for which she was likewise subjected to torture. They beat the martyrs, tore at their bodies with iron hooks, scorched them over red-hot grates, but they were not able to break the wondrous endurance of the Lord's confessors. Three soldiers torturing the saints were struck by the magnanimous spirit of the martyrs, and they in turn believed in Christ. These newly chosen of God were named Quadratus, Acacius and Stratonicus, and they were immediately executed. The tormentor tried to seduce Saint Juliana with a promise to take her in marriage, if she were to renounce Christ, but the saint refused the offer of the tempter and remained steadfast. By order of the emperor they gave the martyress over to a house of ill repute for defiling, but the Lord preserved her there also: anyone who tried to touch the saint lost their sight. Then the enraged emperor commanded that they again burn at the bodies of the saints. The people crowding about and seeing the suffering of the saints began to murmur loudly, and Aurelian gave orders to behead the martyrs immediately. With gladdened face the brother and sister went to execution singing: "For Thou (Lord) hath saved us from the vexatious and hath shamed those hating us"

A statue of St. Juliana is located in St. Peter's Basilica in the Vatican. The statue created was c.1702-1703 by sculptor Giovanni Pietro Mauri.

The height of the statue is 3.1 m. (10 ft 4in) travertine. The woman is wearing a simple dress and large cloak, which is held in part with the left hand. It is a static and heavy work that has undergone extensive renovations, including a totally new face.

Juliana and her brother Paul were listed in the old Roman Martyrology as having suffered martyrdom at Acra in the Holy Land under Aurelian. They were beheaded because they could not be dissuaded from the Christian faith. Because of a lack of verifiable historical information, they were removed from the 2004 Roman Martyrology.
