= Athanasios Hamakiotis =

20th-century Greek Orthodox hieromonk and saint

Hieromonk; Elder
- Born: 1891; Tourlada, Kalavryta, Greece
- Died: 17 August 1967; Rodopoli, Attica, Greece
- Venerated in: Eastern Orthodox Church
- Canonized: 17 November 2023 by Bartholomew I of Constantinople
- Major shrine: Panagia Faneromeni Monastery (Rodopoli, Attica)
- Feast: 17 August; 23 October (translation of relics)

Athanasios Hamakiotis (Greek: Αθανάσιος Χαμακιώτης; 1891 – 17 August 1967), born George Hamakiotis (Greek: Γεώργιος Χαμακιώτης), was a Greek Orthodox hieromonk and spiritual father noted for his pastoral work in Attica. He served as parish priest at the historic church of Panagia Neratziotissa in Marousi and later founded the women’s monastery of Panagia Faneromeni in Rodopoli, where he reposed in 1967.

The Holy Synod of the Ecumenical Patriarchate of Constantinople added Hamakiotis to the diptychs of the saints on 17 November 2023, with his memory kept on 17 August (the day of his repose) and on 23 October (the day of the translation of his relics).

== Canonization and veneration ==
On 17 November 2023 the Holy Synod of the Ecumenical Patriarchate resolved to canonize Elder Athanasios; the decision also set his liturgical commemorations for 17 August and 23 October. The formal signing of the Patriarchal and Synodal Act took place at the Patriarchal Church of St George on 18 December 2023.

== Legacy ==
Orthodox sources emphasize Hamakiotis’s ascetical life, compassionate pastoral care and practical charity during times of hardship, especially in Marousi and the wider Attica region.
