= Christopher of Trebizond =

Saint Christopher of Trebizond was the head of the Soumela Monastery on Mount Mela in the second half of the seventh century (641–668). He is sometimes called Saint Christopher of Gazara.

Born in a village called Gazara in Trebizond in the region of Pontus, Anatolia, according to Eastern Orthodox tradition Christopher was a simple illiterate farmer, whose life changed dramatically when the Virgin Mary miraculously appeared to him while he was plowing a field. She instructed him to leave his farm, travel to Mount Mela, and become a priest, to revive her imperial home, ordering him "Thus leave the oxen and plow in the field. Show yourself before the bishop and reveal to him all that I have told you and say to him that he is to ordain you to the priesthood." When Christopher protested that he was unworthy of the priesthood, as he could not read or write, Mary breathed into his mouth, granting him these gifts. He was ordained as a priest and later served as the abbot of the Soumela Monastery, where he is credited with preserving the Gospel Book of Saint Christopher.

The Eastern Orthodox church celebrates his feast day on 18 August.
