= Joakim =

- Gender: Male

Origin
- Region of origin: Scandinavia

Joakim or Joacim is a male given name primarily used in Scandinavian languages, Estonian and Finnish. It is derived from a transliteration of the Hebrew יהוֹיָקִים, and literally means "lifted by Jehovah".

In the Old Testament, Jehoiakim was a king of Judah. In deutero-canonical texts, Joakim is the husband of Susanna, the central character in the narrative of Susanna (Daniel 13), and the high priest who leads the people of Israel in prayer in the Book of Judith.

In the Roman Catholic, Orthodox, and Anglican traditions, Saint Joachim was the husband of Saint Anne and the father of Mary, the mother of Jesus. The story of Joachim and Anne appears first in the apocryphal Gospel of James: Joachim and Anne are not mentioned in the Bible.

Notable people with the name Joakim or Joacim include:

- Joakim Åhlund (born 1970), Swedish musician, producer, and music video director
- Joakim Alexandersson (born 1976), Swedish football player
- Joakim Alriksson (born 1992), Swedish footballer
- Joakim Andersson (born 1971), Swedish diver
- Joakim Andersson (born 1989), Swedish ice hockey player
- Joakim Askling (born 1990), Swedish footballer
- Joakim Assenmacher (born 1963), German long jumper
- Joakim Austnes (born 1983), Norwegian football player
- Joakim Bäckström (born 1978), Swedish professional golfer
- Joakim Balmy (born 1997), French footballer
- Joakim Berg (born 1970), Swedish musician
- Joakim Berner (born 1957), Finnish tennis player
- Joacim Bjøreng (born 1995), Norwegian ski jumper
- Joakim "Jo" Bonnier (1930–1972), Swedish motor racer
- Joakim Borda-Pedreira (born 1977), Swedish art historian, art critic, and art collector
- Joakim Brodén (born 1980), Swedish-Czech musician, lead singer of the metal band Sabaton
- Joacim Cans (born 1970), Swedish musician
- Joakim Carlsson (born 1972), Swedish curler
- Joakim Cronman (1638–1703), Swedish soldier
- Joakim Demmer (born 1965), Swedish filmmaker, screenwriter, cinematographer, and editor
- Joakim Dvärby (born 1989), Swedish judoka
- Joakim Edsjö, Swedish professor of theoretical physics
- Joakim Edström (born 1992), Swedish footballer
- Joacim Eriksson (born 1990), Swedish ice hockey player
- Joakim Eriksson (born 1979), Swedish ice hockey player
- Joacim Esbjörs (born 1970), Swedish ice hockey player
- Joakim Eskildsen (born 1971), Danish art photographer
- Joakim Eyde (born 1991), Norwegian footballer
- Joakim Flyg (born 1990), Swedish curler
- Joakim Fohlman (born 1979), Swedish entrepreneur and activist
- Joakim Garff (born 1960), Danish theologian
- Joakim Grönhagen (born 1972), Swedish professional golfer
- Joakim Gruev (1828–1912), Bulgarian writer
- Joakim Haeggman (born 1969), Swedish golfer
- Joakim Hagelin (born 1989), Swedish ice hockey player
- Joakim Halvarsson (born 1972), Swedish ski mountaineer
- Joakim Hauge (born 1973), Norwegian biologist
- Joakim Hedqvist (born 1977), Swedish bandy player
- Joacim Heier (born 1986), Norwegian footballer
- Joakim Hellstrand (born 1984), Swedish YouTuber and Twitch streamer
- Joakim Herbut (1928–2005), Macedonian Catholic prelate
- Joakim Hillding (born 1988), Swedish ice hockey player
- Joakim Holmquist (born 1969), Swedish swimmer
- Joacim Holtan (born 1998), Norwegian footballer
- Joakim Hykkerud (born 1986), Norwegian handball player
- Joakim Ingelsson (born 1963), Swedish orienteer
- Joakim Jensen (born 1987), Norwegian ice hockey player
- Joacim Jonsson (born 1974), Swedish football manager
- Joakim Jonsson, Swedish drummer
- Joakim Karchovski (c. 1750–1820), Macedonian writer
- Joakim Karlberg (born 1964), Swedish speed skater
- Joakim Karlsson, multiple people
- Joakim Kemell (born 2004), Finnish ice hockey player
- Joakim Lagergren (born 1991), Swedish professional golfer
- Joakim Larsson, Swedish singer known professionally as Joey Tempest
- Joakim Larsson (born 1969), Swedish researcher
- Joakim Lartey (born 1953), Ghanaian-American drummer
- Joakim Latonen (born 1998), Finnish footballer
- Joakim Lehmkuhl (1895–1984), Norwegian engineer, industrialist, and politician
- Joakim Lindberg (born 1993), Swedish canoeist
- Joakim Lindengren (born 1962), Swedish cartoonist
- Joakim Lindner (born 1991), Swedish footballer
- Joakim Lindström (born 1983), Swedish ice hockey player
- Joacim "Jake E" Lundberg, Swedish heavy metal vocalist
- Joakim Lystad (born 1953), Norwegian civil servant
- Joakim Mæhle (born 1997), Danish footballer
- Joakim Marković (c. 1685–1757), Austrian-Serbian painter
- Joakim Mattsson (born 1990), Swedish ice hockey player
- Joakim Medin (born 1984), Swedish journalist and writer
- Joakim Mogren, false name used during initial reveal of Metal Gear Solid V: The Phantom Pain
- Joakim Nätterqvist (born 1974), Swedish actor
- Joakim Nilsson (disambiguation), multiple people
- Joakim Noah (born 1985), American–French–Swedish basketball player
- Joakim Nordström (born 1992), Swedish ice hockey player
- Joakim Nyström (born 1963), Swedish tennis player
- Joakim Olausson (born 1995), Swedish footballer
- Joakim Oldorff (born 2002), Finnish badminton player
- Joakim Palme (born 1958), Swedish political scientist and sociologist
- Joacim Persson, Swedish record producer and songwriter
- Joakim Persson (disambiguation), multiple people
- Joakim Petersson (born 1983), Swedish member of the band Vains of Jenna
- Joakim Pirinen (born 1961), Swedish cartoonist
- Joakim Puhk (1888–1942), Estonian businessman
- Joakim Sandell (born 1974), Swedish politician
- Joakim Frederik Schouw (1789–1852), Danish lawyer
- Joakim Sandell (born 1975), Swedish politician
- Joakim Sjöhage (born 1986), Swedish football player
- Joakim Soria (born 1984), Mexican baseball player
- Joakim Stulić (1730–1817), Croatian lexicographer
- Joakim Sundström (born 1965), Swedish sound designer and musician
- Joakim Thåström (born 1957), Swedish musician
- Joacim Tuuri (born 1989), Finnish footballer
- Joakim Vujić (1772–1847), Serbian dramatist
- Joakim Wasiliadis (Ioakeim Vasiliadis, born 1965), Greek professional wrestler
- Joakim Wikström (born 1991), Swedish professional golfer
- Joakim Wrele, Swedish footballer
- Joakim Wulff (born 1979), Swedish footballer
- Joakim Zander (born 1975), Swedish author and lawyer

== See also ==
=== Related names ===
- Joachim (given name)
- Joaquim
- Joaquín

=== Miscellaneous ===
- Joakimfest – Annual international theatre festival held in Kragujevac, Serbia
