= List of Portuguese women artists =

This is a list of women artists who were born in Portugal or whose artworks are closely associated with that country.

== A ==
- Sarah Affonso (1899–1983), painter and illustrator
- Helena Almeida (1934–2018), photographer, performance artist, painter
- Sofia Areal (born 1960), visual artist
- Tereza de Arriaga (1915–2013), painter

== B ==
- Maria Augusta Bordalo Pinheiro (1841–1915), painter, lacemaker

== C ==
- Lourdes Castro (1930–2022), painter, also collages, shadow puppets, silhouettes
- Evelina Coelho (1945–2013), painter

== F ==
- Deolinda Fonseca (born 1954), painter
- Marisa Ferreira (born 1983), painter

== G ==
- Raquel Gameiro (1889–1970), watercolour painter and illustrator

== L ==
- Isabel Laginhas (1942–2018), abstract painter

== M ==
- Maluda, Maria de Lourdes Ribeiro (1934–1999), painter and illustrator
- Isabel Meyrelles (born 1929), surrealist sculptor, poet

== P ==
- Abigail de Paiva Cruz (1883–1944), painter, sculptor
- Regina Pessoa (born 1969), animator

== R ==
- Rosa Ramalho (1888–1977), ceramist
- Paula Rego (1935–2022), visual artist

== S ==
- Aurélia de Souza (1866–1922), Chilean-born Portuguese painter
- Sofia Martins de Sousa (1870–1960), Portuguese painter
- Teresa Nunes Alves de Sousa (born 1979), visual artist
- Katherine Swift (1956–2004), Irish-born Portuguese painter

== T ==
- Ana Tristany (born 1966), painter, educator

== V ==
- Joana Vasconcelos (born 1971), contemporary artist
- Maria Helena Vieira da Silva (1908–1992), Portuguese-French abstractionist painter
