= Eyde =

Eyde is a Norwegian surname.

== Notable people ==
Notable people with this surname include:

- Edythe Eyde (1921–2015), American author who used the pen name Lisa Ben
- Joakim Eyde (born 1991), Norwegian footballer (no) (it)
- Sam Eyde (1866–1940), Norwegian engineer and industrialist
