= Ukens Revy =

Norwegian periodical

Ukens Revy (roughly "Weekly Review") was a Norwegian periodical, published in Oslo.

== History and profile ==
Ukens Revy was founded in September 1914 as a conservative-leaning literary and political periodical. The first editor was Hjalmar Christensen, who co-edited with Ronald Fangen and Victor Mogens. From issue #5/1914 Mogens took over the editor chair. It was published by Helge Erichsen & Co. until 1 January 1916, when it was taken over by a limited company. The limited company A/S Ukens Revys nye Aktieselskap took over on 1 January 1920. In 1920, it had five employees and was published every Friday. The board of directors at the time consisted of C. J. Hambro, Peter Andreas Morell and Rolf Bye.

Hambro took over as editor-in-chief in 1921, as Mogens founded his own magazine, Utenrikspolitikken. Mogens would belong to Fedrelandslaget, whose views clashed with those of Hambro. Hambro remained editor until 1929.
