= Maluda =

Maluda may refer to:

- Maluda (artist) (1934—1999), Portuguese painter
- Maluda Munavarova, Uzbek women's footballer
