= Halvarsson =

Halvarsson is a Swedish surname. Notable people with the surname include:

- Jan Halvarsson (1942–2020), Swedish cross-country skier
- Joakim Halvarsson (born 1972), Swedish ski mountaineer
