= Tropa =

Tropa is a Spanish and Portuguese word equivalent to the English troop. It may refer to:

- Tropa de Elite, a 2007 Brazilian movie
  - Tropa de Elite 2, the 2010 sequel
- Team Robredo–Pangilinan (TRoPa), a 2022 Philippine election coalition
- Francisco Tropa (born 1968), Portuguese sculptor
- A nickname for the Russian P-15 radar
