= Norwegian nationalism =

Flag of Norway

Norwegian nationalism (Norwegian: Norsk nasjonalisme) is a form of nationalism that promotes the unity of Norwegians and their culture under a nation state.

== History ==
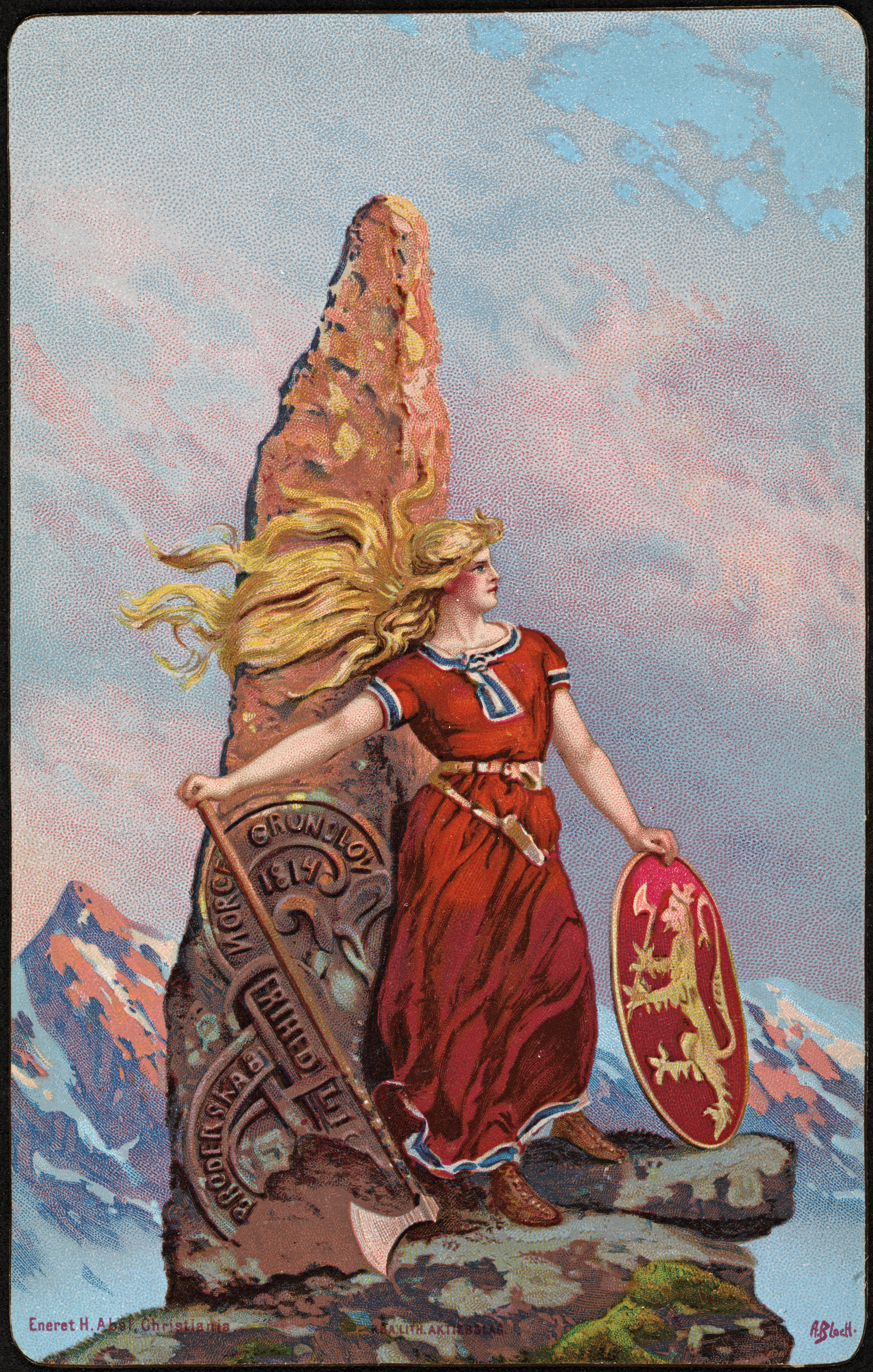
Postcard advocating for Norwegian Nationalism, in 1905: "FREEDOM, EQUALITY, BROTHERHOOD OF NORWAYS CONSTITUTION 1814" An allegorical "Mother Norway" depicted as a blonde Viking Valkyrie by Andreas Bloch (1860–1917).

=== 19th century ===
The first organized Norwegian nationalist movement arose in Denmark. Norwegian students came together in Norwegian Society in the university city of Copenhagen. Political independence was not seen as realistic, but the desire for more internal autonomy was expressed through the desire for a specifically Norwegian university.

Nationalistic sentiment in Norway grew strongly in the early 19th century. This was linked to the Napoleonic Wars and the influence of the French Revolution. The sense of community was also strengthened by the conflict with Sweden. The 17th of May – Constitution Day – which began to be celebrated in 1824, was also an important factor. When National Romanticism broke through in the 1840s, old culture was brought forth by artists, writers, and other champions of nationalism.

In the 1870s and 1880s, the Liberal Party in particular was a nationalist party during the struggle for parliamentarism, which was gradually introduced from 1884. The same applied to the Target Movement and the Norwegian Youth Association. The Target Movement led by Ivar Aasen claimed there were two cultures in Norway, the upper class consisting of the nobility, civil servants and parts of the bourgeoisie who represented an elitist and foreign, mainly Danish culture, and "the Norwegian people" that had roots in peasantry and represented Norwegian popular culture. The notion of the two cultures also existed outside the target group, including among the Liberal party and poets such as Aasmund Olavsson Vinje and Arne Garborg. The latter two‚ however, interpreted the two-culture doctrine more strictly than the rest of the supporters of this division. Garborg went so far to say that there were not only two cultures in Norway, but two nations. Garborg believed only those who embraced Landsmål and true Norwegian culture could be considered Norwegian and those who did not had to be considered Danes. This created conflicts among the more moderate nationalists. The conflicts surrounding the dissolution of the Swedish-Norwegian union in 1905 led to political nationalism becoming popular with the left wing, but this nationalism was mostly concerned with national independence, and less so with what was considered true Norwegian culture.

=== Interwar period ===
While in the 19th century people were mostly concerned with the concepts of ethnicity and nation, throughout the 20th century people increasingly became concerned with race. The concept of different human races originated in biology, which at the time had grown in prestige. National minorities such as Sámi, Kven, Travellers and Jews were considered to belong to a different race than Norwegians, though few had systematic racist ideologies. Such nationalism became common in the interwar period among the Norwegian Agrarian Association and other organizations. With the labor movement, nationalism was less popular; for them, social class was more important than nation.

With the victory of the Soviets against the White movement in the Russian Civil War, and the rise of other revolutionary marxist movements across Europe, nationalism among the right wing in Norway would take on an anti-communist character. One of the largest nationalist anti-communist movements, and largest right-wing mass movement in the country was the Fatherland League.

=== Second World War ===
During the Second World War, the event led to tremendous growth of nationalism. Both the Norwegian resistance movement and the National Gathering (NS) claimed to be the real custodians of the Norwegian nation. The development of the war and Germany's military dictatorship led over 90% of the population coming to regard the resistance movement as the "good Norwegians", while the NS were regarded as traitors to the country. The historian Øystein Sørensen has shown that the NS had no unified view of nationalism, but was divided into a Norwegian-nationalist wing, and a pan-Germanic Nazi wing.

Many members of the Fatherland League had a strong antipathy towards the NS and many took part in the resistance movement. Key figures of the movement such as Otto Skirstad was shot by the Quisling regime. like many organizations some members of the movement also joined the NS.

== See also ==
- Racism in Norway
- Right-wing politics
- History of Norway
- Church of Norway
- Scandinavism
