= Victor Mogens =

Norwegian journalist, editor and politician

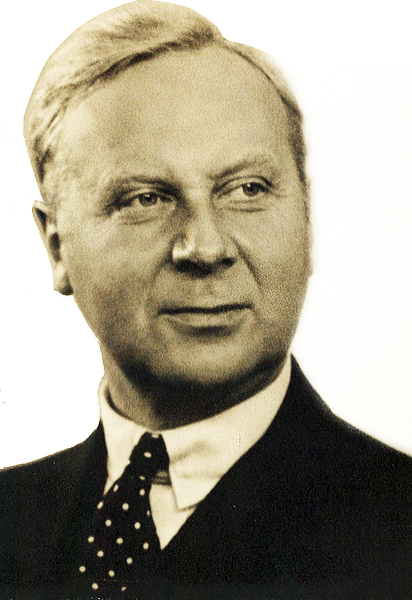
Victor Mogens in the 1930s

Victor Andreas Emanuel Mogens (16 August 1886 – 17 January 1964) was a Norwegian journalist, editor and politician for the Fatherland League.

== Pre-war life and career ==
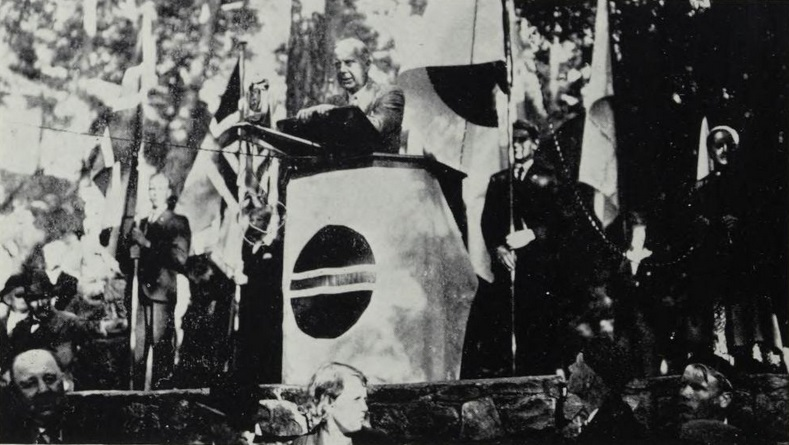
Mogens speaking at a Fatherland League rally in 1935.

He was born in Bergen, and grew up in Bergen, Trondheim, Kristiania and Holmestrand before returning to Bergen to finish his secondary education at Bergen Cathedral School in 1905. He then went through some years of law studies. He was a journalist in Landsbladet from 1910 to 1911, and was then hired in Verdens Gang where he soon became subeditor. He then edited the periodical Ukens Revy from 1914 to 1921 and his own magazine Utenrikspolitikken from 1921 to 1924, but the latter publication went defunct. He was a journalist in Vor Verden from 1927 and editor from 1929 to 1932. He also edited Norges Næringsveier.

Mogens had a parallel career in the Norwegian Broadcasting Corporation radio. He started as a foreign news journalist there in 1927, and soon started as a commentator. Some liked him, but many complained about him being biased, and he was pressured to resign in 1936. Among the complainers were the British legation in Norway. Mogens instead started and edited his own publication, Utenrikspolitisk kronikk.

In the same year he was a candidate for the 1936 Norwegian parliamentary election for the anti-Communist Fatherland League organization for the constituency of Akershus. The candidacy was unsuccessful, but he chaired this organization from 1938.

== World War II ==
Fedrelandslaget was disestablished in 1940, when Nazi Germany invaded Norway on 9 April 1940 as a part of World War II. The Nazi Vidkun Quisling performed a coup d'état, but Mogens tried to have Quisling removed, as he was still hoping that Fedrelandslaget and not Quisling's party Nasjonal Samling would be the main cooperator with the German occupants. On 26 April 1940, the Bremen-based broadcaster of Norwegian-language propagandistic news, Edvard Sylou-Creutz, lamented the absence of Mogens as a commentator, stating that if Mogens had continued, the Norwegian people might have been more friendly towards Germany.

Mogens did return to the Norwegian Broadcasting Corporation. He was asked by the Reichskommissariat Norwegen's Hauptabteilung Volksaufklärung to become a commentator, radio lecturer or editor of the broadcast programming magazine Hallo-Hallo!. He declined all these offers, but held his first speech on 11 June 1940, one day after Norway's capitulation. In it, he criticized Quisling as well as the pre-war, now-exiled Labour government. Two weeks later he hailed the downfall of the parliamentarian system.

He was favored by many Germans; according to historian Hans Fredrik Dahl he was "the Germans' alternative to Quisling". He was later discussed as a government minister, but disappeared from the spotlight in the autumn of 1940. The reason was that the Norwegians who were counterparts to German occupants in governmental negotiations (Norwegian: riksrådsforhandlingene), could not stomach Mogens and his views conveyed on 11 June.

From 1942 he lived in a cabin in Vågå Municipality, and in 1943 he wrote the self-apologetic book Tyskerne, Quisling og vi andre which was published after the war in 1945. He was not sentenced for treason during the legal purge in Norway after World War II. The main reason was his outspoken antipathies towards Nasjonal Samling.

== Personal and post-war life ==
From 1911 to 1924 Mogens was married to diplomat's daughter Hedvig Ellingsen (1882–1944). From 1930 he was married to Russian-born writer Nina Arkina (1892–1980). He spent much of his later life living abroad, and continued writing books. The best known book was Folket som ikke vil dø ("The People Who Will Not Die"), a pro-Israel publication. He died in January 1964 in Oslo.
