= John Bergstedt =

Swedish ski mountaineer

Personal information
- Born: 2 August 1969 (age 56) Östersund, Sweden

Sport
- Sport: Skiing

John Bergstedt (born 2 August 1969) is a Swedish ski mountaineer.

Bergstedt was born in Östersund and has been member of the national team since 2007. He started ski mountaineering in 2006 and competed first in the Vertex Vinter race in 2007. He lives in Trillevallen.

== Selected results ==
- 2007:
  - 1st, Bix Cup Oppdal single
  - 1st, Bix Cup Oppdal team
  - 6th, European Championship (relay race (together with Patrik Nordin, André Jonsson and Joakim Halvarsson)
- 2008:
  - 10th, World Championship (relay race (together with Patrik Nordin, André Jonsson and Björn Gund)
