= Marisa Ferreira =

Portuguese artist

Marisa Ferreira (born 1983) is a Portuguese artist and researcher with a PhD from the Royal College of Art, London. Her works includes both public art, sculpture, and painting. Her work is held in several private and public collections including Louis Vuitton, Norlinda and Jose Lima Collection, Messmer Foundation, Stavanger Art Museum.

== Life and career ==
Ferreira was born in Guimarães, in the north of Portugal, where she studied the visual arts at the Francisco de Holanda secondary school. From 2002 to 2007, she studied visual art at the Universidade de Évora and from 2007 to 2008 art and design for public spaces at the Faculty of Fine Arts of the University do Porto. She has participated in various short courses and residencies including ones at the Universität der Künste Berlin and the Node Center for Curatorial Studies in Berlin. She also holds a Master in Research (MRes) and a PhD in Arts & Humanities, both from the Royal College of Art, London, United Kingdom.

She has exhibited regularly since 2005 in both solo and joint exhibitions in Europe, the United States, and Asia. She lives in Oslo, Norway since 2008.

== Artistic style ==
Ferreira's style is based on a rigid geometric forms and an idiosyncratic color palette often incorporating aluminum surfaces cut into strips. As curator Joakim Borda-Pedreira pointed out, "Marisa Ferreira makes us aware of our own subjectivity, since two people can see the same painting at the same time and have completely different experiences—where one sees blue, the other sees red."

Ferreira's work is inspired by her childhood memories of growing up in a context of industrial decline in the 1980s in the North of Portugal. Her geometric shapes come from her playing with the leftover's of her parent's metal company as a child, taping them together to create three-dimensional objects. Through practice-led methodologies, she investigates the intersection between ecological transformation, industrial landscapes, colonialism and the Anthropocene to critically examine the role of the artist in interpreting and transforming the urban landscape. She explores how cultural memory and identity are affected by places and tries to reimagine a more inclusive and sustainable future through her art. She also strives to challenge people's perception of waste by using discarded materials. She suggest the subversive potential of waste as a medium in contemporary art and explores artistic methods for reusing, repurposing, and reimagining the natural resources already available to us. Waste thus becomes a resource and a political material that carries memory and evidence of human activities.

== Public art projects ==
- 2020-27: A Bigger Splash & Blue Bonds - Two art commissions for the urban project "Kverndalen in new light", curated by Kristine Wessel/ Mesén for Skien/ KORO - Public Art Council, Norway (upcoming)
- 2026: Landscapes of Belonging, curated by Ketil Nergaard for Skjetten school, Lillestrøm, Norway
- 2024: Warming Seas, curated by Thale Fastvold for Spjelkavik Arena, Ålesund, Norway
- 2022: Expanded Transitions, curated by Louis Vuitton (LVMH), Rodeo Drive, Los Angeles, US
- 2022: Tipping Point, curated by Ebba Bring for Aas Arena, Norway
- 2020-22: Rising sea, curated by Åse Kamilla Aslaksen for REV Ocean - Research Expedition Vessel, Norway
- 2020: Expanded Inversions, curated by Ina Skarpodde for Levre school, Bærum Kommune, Norway
- 2019: Transition Mirrors II, curated by Louis Vuitton (LVMH), Omotesando, Tokyo, Japan
- 2018: Transition mirrors, curated by Torunn Thrall for Frøyland school, Kvernaland, Norway
- 2017-2019: Shall we dance? Curated by Mesén/ Oslo Municipality, Norway
- 2017: Chromatic Sounds, curated by Rina Whyte for St Raphael's College, Loughrea, Ireland
- 2015/19: Mammography department, curated by Robert Breen for Royal Liverpool University Hospital, UK
- 2015: Rear window, art installation on the facade of the Oslo Central Station in Norway as part of the "Rom for kunst" (Room for Art) initiative
- 2013: Colour Visions, large scale painting for the main entrance of the oil platform Ekofisk 2/4L, ConocoPhillips;

== Solo exhibitions ==
- 2026: Spatial Practices: the Creative Act, CAAA Center for Art and Architecture Affairs, Portugal
- 2026: EcoNarratives of a Trembling Earth, Galeria Presença, Porto
- 2025: Deep Wounds, Royal College of Art, London, UK
- 2022: Notes of a Journey. On Matter, Extractivism and Displacement, w/ Carmen Mariscal, Galeria Presença, Portugal
- 2022: An Archive of Evidence, Hå Gamle Prestegård, Norway
- 2019: Urban Landscapes, Messmer Kunsthall, Germany
- 2018: Primary Structures: A place beyond failure, Galeria Presença, Porto, Portugal
- 2017: Colour in Space and Time, Bærum Kulturhus, Norway
- 2017: Space, rhythm & movement, Buskerud Kunstsenter, Norway
- 2016: Depth, Space and Colour, Galerie Messmer, Germany
- 2015: Space, rhythm & movement, de:Kunsthalle Messmer, Germany
- 2015: Space, rhythm & movement, Galleri Ask, Horten, Norway
- 2015: Space, rhythm & movement, Galleri Gann, Sandnes, Norway
- 2013: Colour on Colour, Galleri Pushwagner v/ Window Box, Oslo, Norway
- 2012: Colour + Space, Kunstplass -5, Oslo, Norway
- 2012: Colour + Form, Galleri Sult, Stavanger, Norway
- 2009: Two ways of thinking, Galleri F12, Stavanger, Norway

== Awards and bursaries ==
- 2016: Bildende Kunstneres Vederlagsfond bursary, Norway
- 2015: Kulturrådet, Arts Council Norway bursary, Norway
- 2012: Bildende Kunstneres Vederlagsfond bursary, Norway
- 2011: Statens Kunstnerstipend bursary, Norway
- 2011: Special Jury Prize, IX Bienal de Pintura do Eixo Atlântico, Spain/Portugal
- 2006: 1º Prize, Cow Parade Lisbon – GuimarãeShopping, Portugal
- 2006: 1º Prize, Ceranor Competição Jovens Designers, Portugal
- 2005: Honorable Mention, Pintura, Salúquia às Artes, Moura, Portugal
