= Nina Arkina =

Nina Arkina (1892–1980) was a Russian-born Norwegian writer.

She was born in Odessa, but lived in Norway. She issued biographical novels about Catherine the Great (1949), Alexander I of Russia (two volumes in 1950 and 1951), Nicholas I of Russia and Alexander Pushkin (1954), Alexander II of Russia (1956), Alexander III of Russia and Nicholas II of Russia (1963), Sonya Kovalevsky (1967), Karl Marx (1968) and Vladimir Lenin (1972).

She was married to editor and politician Victor Mogens.
