= Potosi School =

The Potosí School refers to 17th-century Baroque artworks from Potosí, the location of the Spanish colonial mint: "according to some accounts, the city was an art factory producing at least 200,000 paintings a year". Its most significant artist was Melchor Pérez Holguín, from Cochabamba. Artworks from Potosí are similar to works from the Cusco School but are characterized by their "more marked primitivism, the rigidity of the figures, and the abundance of 'narrative pictures'".
