= Patrik Nordin =

Swedish ski mountaineer (born 1971)

Patrik Nordin (born 7 October 1971) is a Swedish ski mountaineer and cross-country skier.

Born in Södertälje, Nordin has been member of the national team since 2006. He started ski mountaineering in 1997 and competed first in the Swedish Cup race in Åre in the same year.

== Selected results ==
- 2007:
  - 1st, Bix Storulvan team
  - 1st, Box Oppdal team
  - 6th, European Championship (relay race (together with John Bergstedt, André Jonsson and Joakim Halvarsson)
- 2008:
  - 10th, World Championship (relay race (together with John Bergstedt, André Jonsson and Björn Gund)
