= Joakim Lehmkuhl =

Norwegian engineer, industrialist, politician (1895–1984)

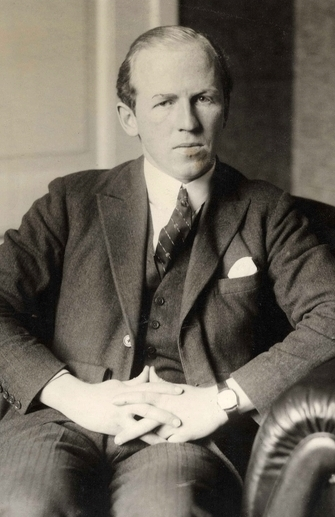
Joakim Lehmkuhl, c. 1935

Joakim Lehmkuhl (22 September 1895 – 15 October 1984) was a Norwegian engineer, industrialist and politician.

Lehmkuhl was born in Bergen to former Minister of Labour Kristofer Lehmkuhl, and Magdalene Marie Michelsen, sister to Christian Michelsen, Norway's first independent Prime Minister. He took the initiative to form the Fatherland League in 1925, and chaired the organization until 1939. He was simultaneously chairman of the board of the newspaper Tidens Tegn from 1936, until 1940 when he fled to the United States. He became co-owner of the company Timex Corporation, and was CEO and chairman until 1974. He died in Nassau, Bahamas in 1984.
