= Teresa Nunes Alves de Sousa =

Portuguese visual artist

Teresa Nunes Alves de Sousa (born 1979) is a Lisbon, Portugal-based visual artist. After studying painting and drawing at the experimental art center ARCO in Lisbon, de Sousa moved to London to study Fine Art at Central Saint Martins. Her work is mostly based on performative text and video, questioning what she defines as an essential space and time of the frame. Her continuous investigation within the phenomenology of architecture breathes through the video work where the frame space becomes her dwelling space.
