= Melchor Pérez de Holguín =

Bolivian painter

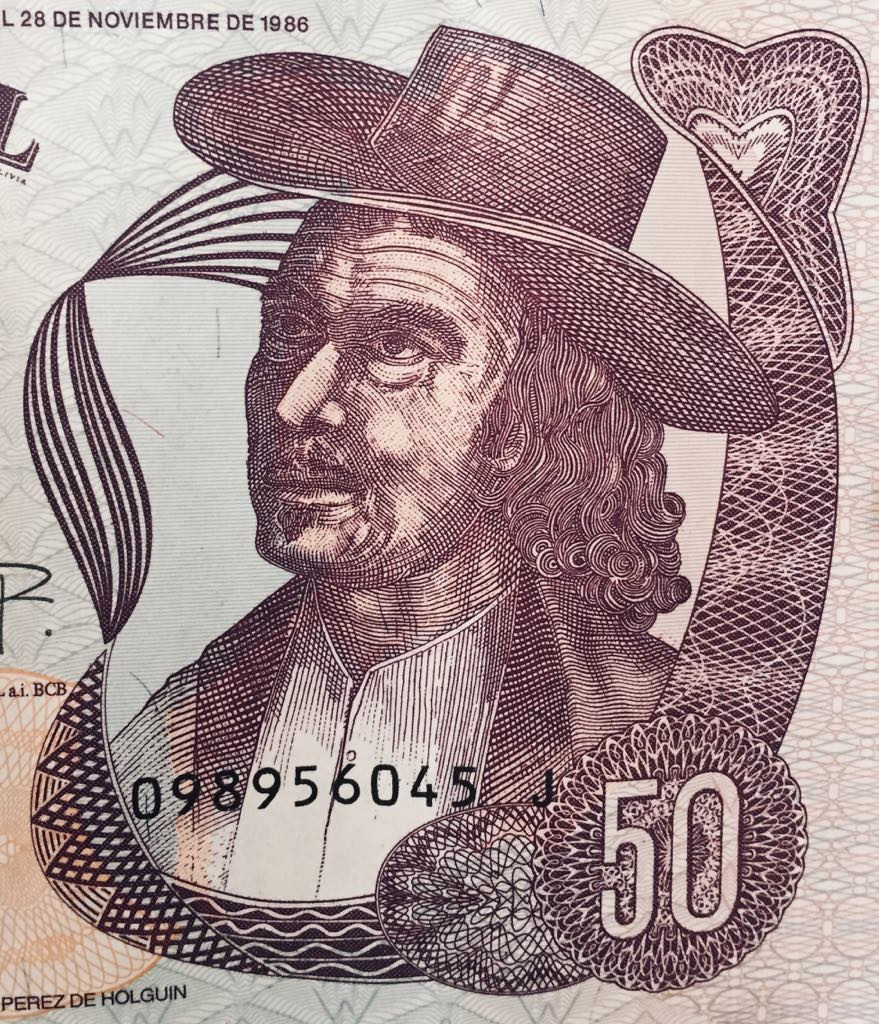
- Born: c. 1660; Cochabamba, Bolivia
- Died: 1732 (aged 71–72)
- Years active: 1689-1732
- Known for: Painting and architecture
- Movement: Potosi School

Melchor Pérez de Holguín (c. 1660-1732) was a painter and architect, known for the creation of Baroque artworks in Potosí. He was a central figure in the Potosi School tradition. He was active from 1689 to his death in 1732.

== Biography ==
Pérez de Holguín was born in Cochabamba around 1660, in colonial Bolivia. He moved to Potosí by 1678.

His painting influences included Bartolomé Esteban Murillo, Francisco de Zurbarán, and Francisco Herrera the Younger. Most of his paintings were done for monastic orders; others were for wealthy landowners in Real Audiencia of Charcas. His earlier paintings were known for their dark tones; later in his career, he used more color.

After his lifetime, he became known as the "Brocha de Oro," or Golden Brush.

As an architect, he created plans for the church of San Lorenzo de Potosí.

== Personal life ==
He had two sons with Micaela del Castillo. The first, Lorenzo, was born circa 1688. Pérez Holguín and del Castillo married in March 1695 and had another son, Martin, that same year. He also had a son named Pedro, born to Antonia Martinez in 1693.

== Legacy ==
Pérez de Holguín is featured on the 50 bolivianos note.

== Gallery ==
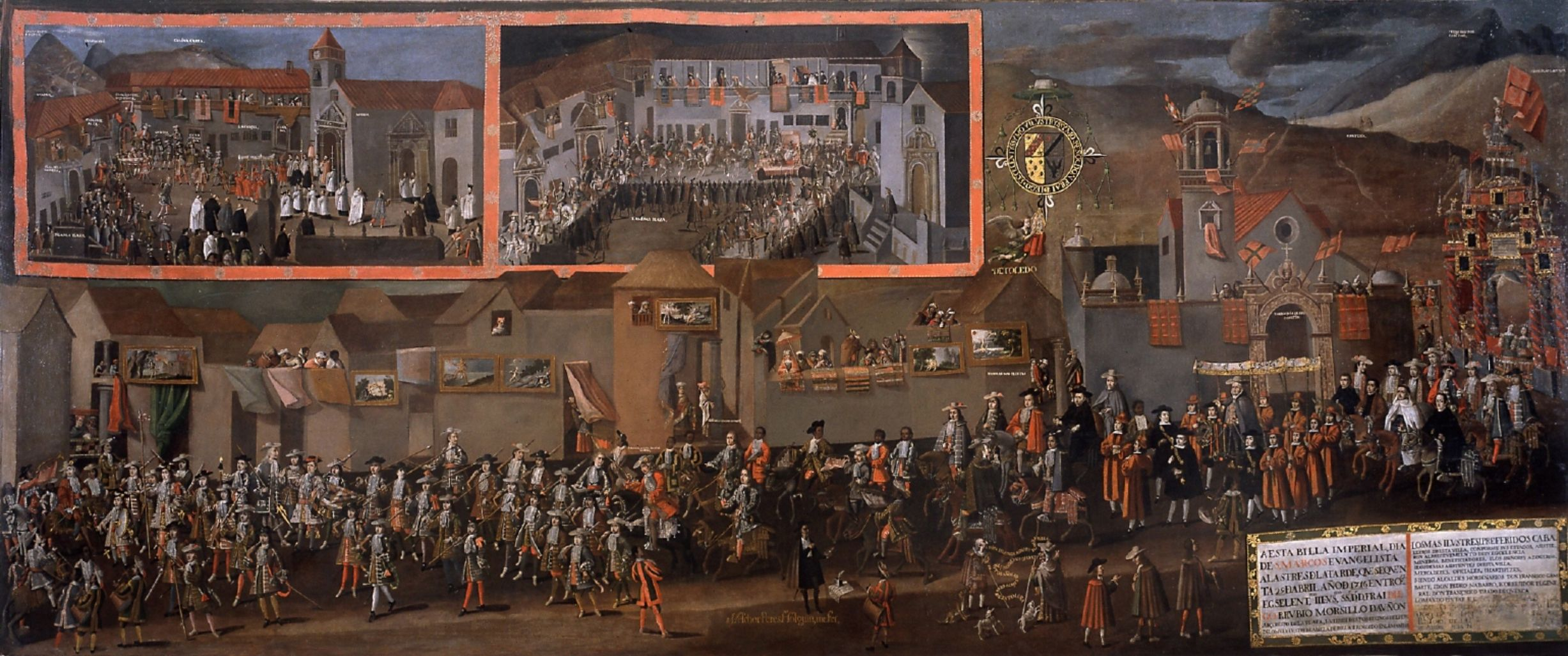
Entrada del Virrey arzobispo Morcillo en Potosí (1718). Museo de América, Madrid.

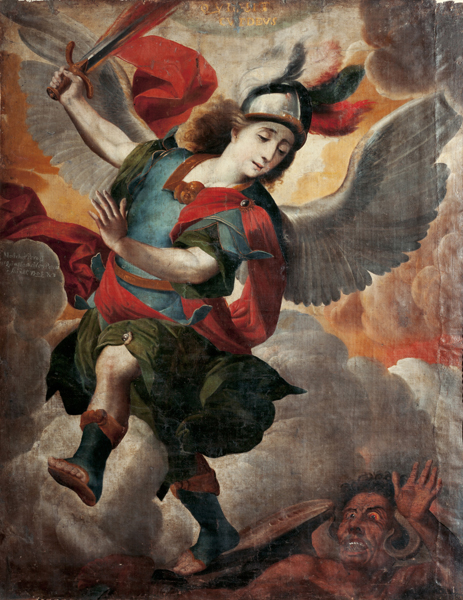
Ángel, National Museum of Art, La Paz.

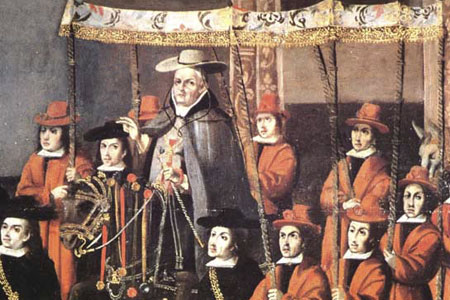
Detail from Entrada del Virrey arzobispo Morcillo en Potosí (1718).

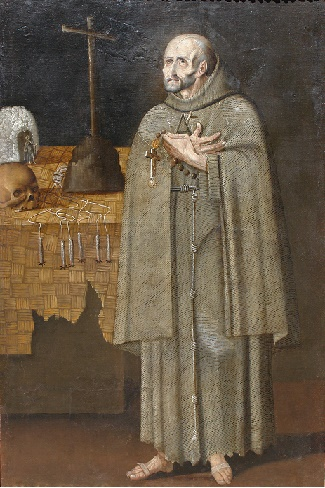
San Pedro de Alcántara. National Mint of Bolivia, Potosí.

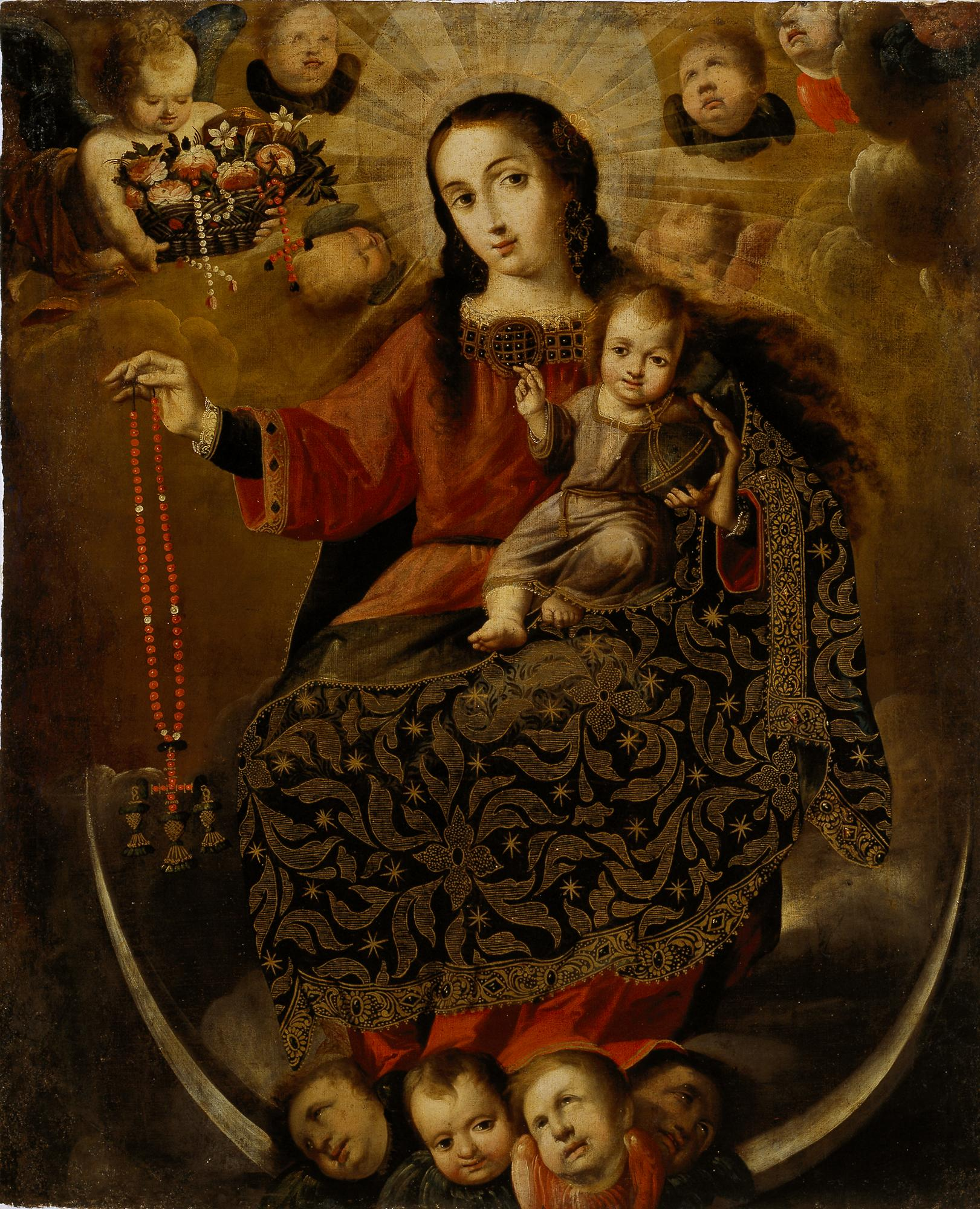
Virgen del Rosario, Dallas Museum of Art.

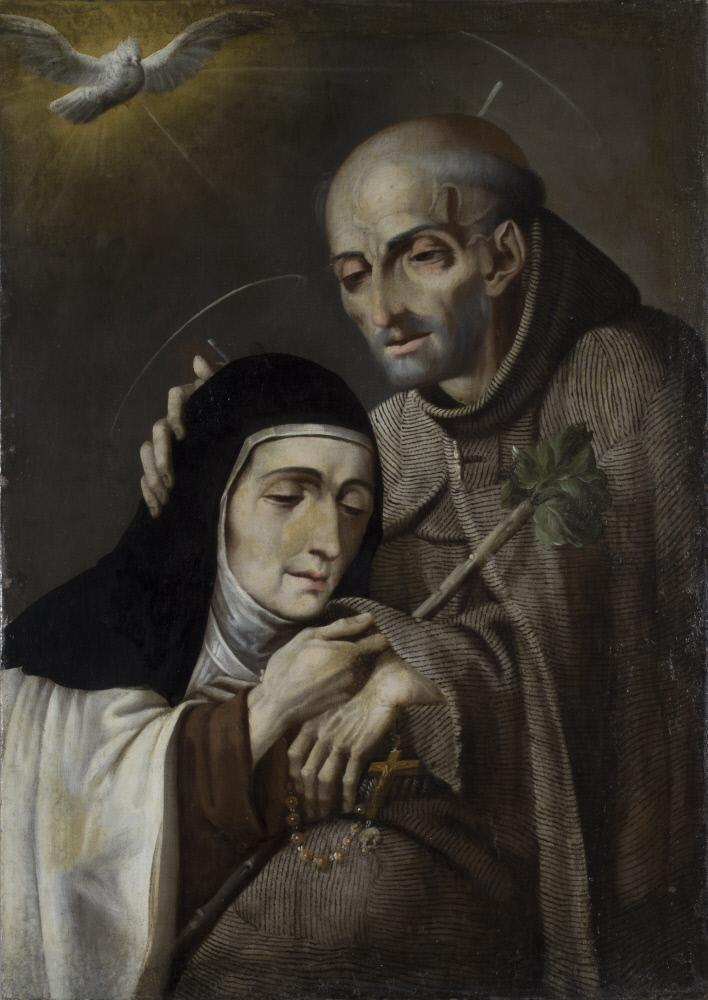
San Pedro y Santa Teresa, Hispanic Society of America, New York.

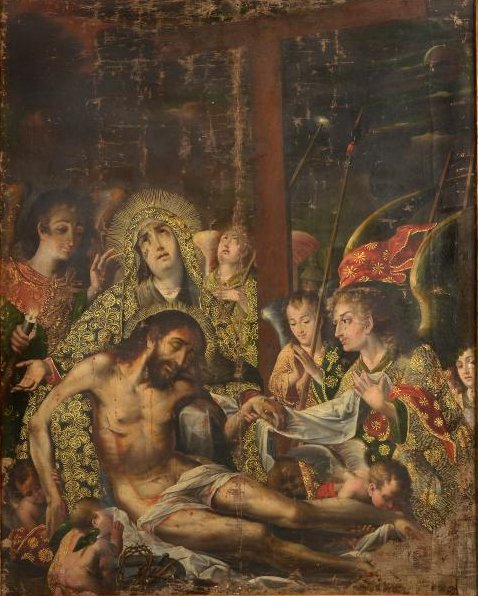
La Piedad, Los Angeles County Museum of Art.
