= Lourdes Castro =

Portuguese artist (1930–2022)

Lourdes Castro ComSE
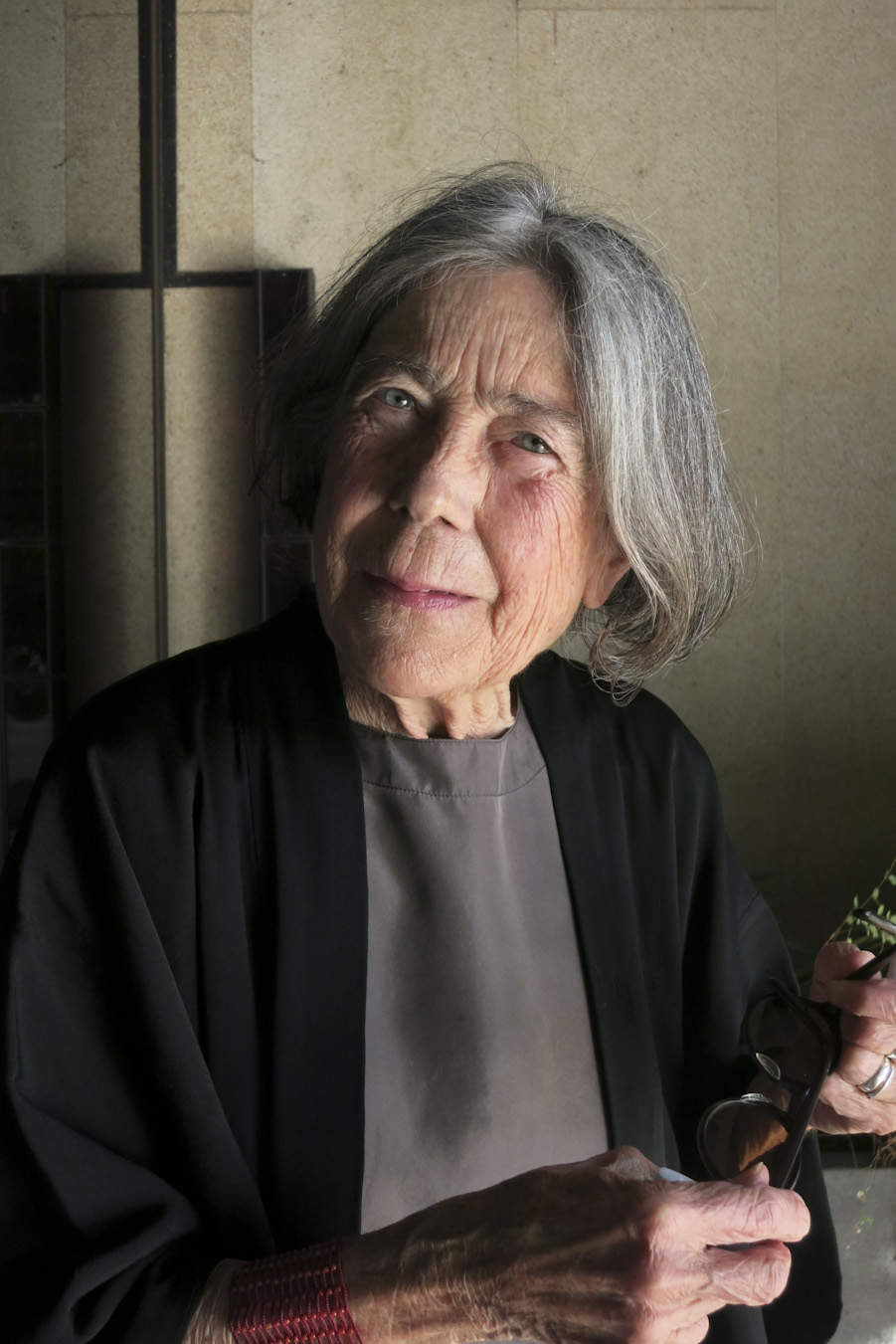
- Castro in 2015
- Born: Maria de Lourdes Bettencourt de Castro; 9 December 1930; Funchal, Madeira, Portugal
- Died: 8 January 2022 (aged 91); Funchal, Madeira, Portugal
- Education: Lisbon School of Fine Arts
- Awards: Medal for Cultural Merit (2020)

Maria de Lourdes Bettencourt de Castro ComSE (9 December 1930 – 8 January 2022) was a Portuguese artist from Funchal, Madeira. After specializing in abstract art, in the 1960s she created collages and silk screens, seeking to capture ephemeral reality. From the 1970s, together with her partner Manuel Zimbro, she developed shadow puppets for her Shadow Theatre, gaining acclaim throughout Europe and Brazil. In 1998, together with Francisco Tropa, she created an installation for Portugal's contribution to the São Paulo Art Biennial.

== Biography ==
Born on 9 December 1930 in Funchal, Lourdes Castro studied at the Lisbon School of Fine Arts. From where she never graduated due to 3 paintings rejected at the time by a teacher. Her first solo exhibition at the Clube Funchalense in 1955 presented her early works which were influenced by Fauvism. On marrying her fellow student René Bertholo (1935–2005), in 1957 she presented an exhibition with him at Lisbon's Galeria Diário de Notícias.

They then spent some time together in Munich before moving to Paris in 1958, thanks to a grant Castro received from the Calouste Gulbenkian Foundation. There the couple published the experimental art journal KWY (1958–1963), creating a movement which included the Bulgarian Christo Vladimirov Javacheff, the German Jan Voss, and Portuguese artists including António Costa Pinheiro, José Escada, João Vieira and Gonçalo Duarte. Together they specialized in silk-screen printing.

Inspired by Árpád Szenes, Castro concentrated on abstract painting but in 1961 followed the Nouveaux Réalistes, creating collages consisting of real objects such as printing press letters or bottle tops in silver-painted boxes. In 1962, she began working with shadows and silhouettes, frequently in portraits of her friends. In 1964, she extended this approach to include layers of screen-printed or transparent acrylics.

From 1973, Castro worked with her lifelong partner Manuel Zimbro, creating shadow theatre shows which were widely presented in South America and Europe. In 1972 and 1979, she was a guest of the DAAD Artists-in-Berlin Program. After 25 years based in Paris, she moved back to Funchal in 1983. In 1998, she worked with Francisco Tropa on an installation for the São Paulo Biennale.

Castro died in Funchal on 8 January 2022, at the age of 91. The President of Portugal, Marcelo Rebelo de Sousa, expressed his regret at Castro's death, whom he described as "one of the most unmistakable Portuguese artists".

== Distinctions ==
=== National orders ===
- Commander of the Order of Saint James of the Sword (8 June 2021)
