= Fatherland League (Norway) =

Norwegian political party from 1925 to 1940

Fatherland League Fedrelandslaget
- Chairman: Joakim Lehmkuhl (1925–38); Victor Mogens (1938–40)
- Founded: 25 January 1925
- Banned: 25 September 1940
- Newspaper: Norges Fremtid (1927–32); ABC (1932–40)
- Membership: 100,000 (1930)
- Ideology: Conservatism; National conservatism Anti-communism; Norwegian nationalism Corporatism
- Political position: Right-wing
- Colors: Red, white, blue (flag of Norway)

The Fatherland League (Norwegian: Fedrelandslaget) was a Norwegian nationalist and conservative political organisation during the interwar period. Founded in 1925, the movement aimed to unite all bourgeois forces against the rise of the Labour Party. At its peak of popular support and political influence around 1930, it was the single largest mass movement ever organised on the political right in Norway, with an estimated 100,000 members. The movement began to decline through the 1930s, followed by some unsuccessful attempts to gain direct influence as a political party. The Fatherland League was banned and dissolved during the German occupation of Norway in 1940 due to its opposition to the government of Vidkun Quisling.

== History ==
=== Background and founding ===
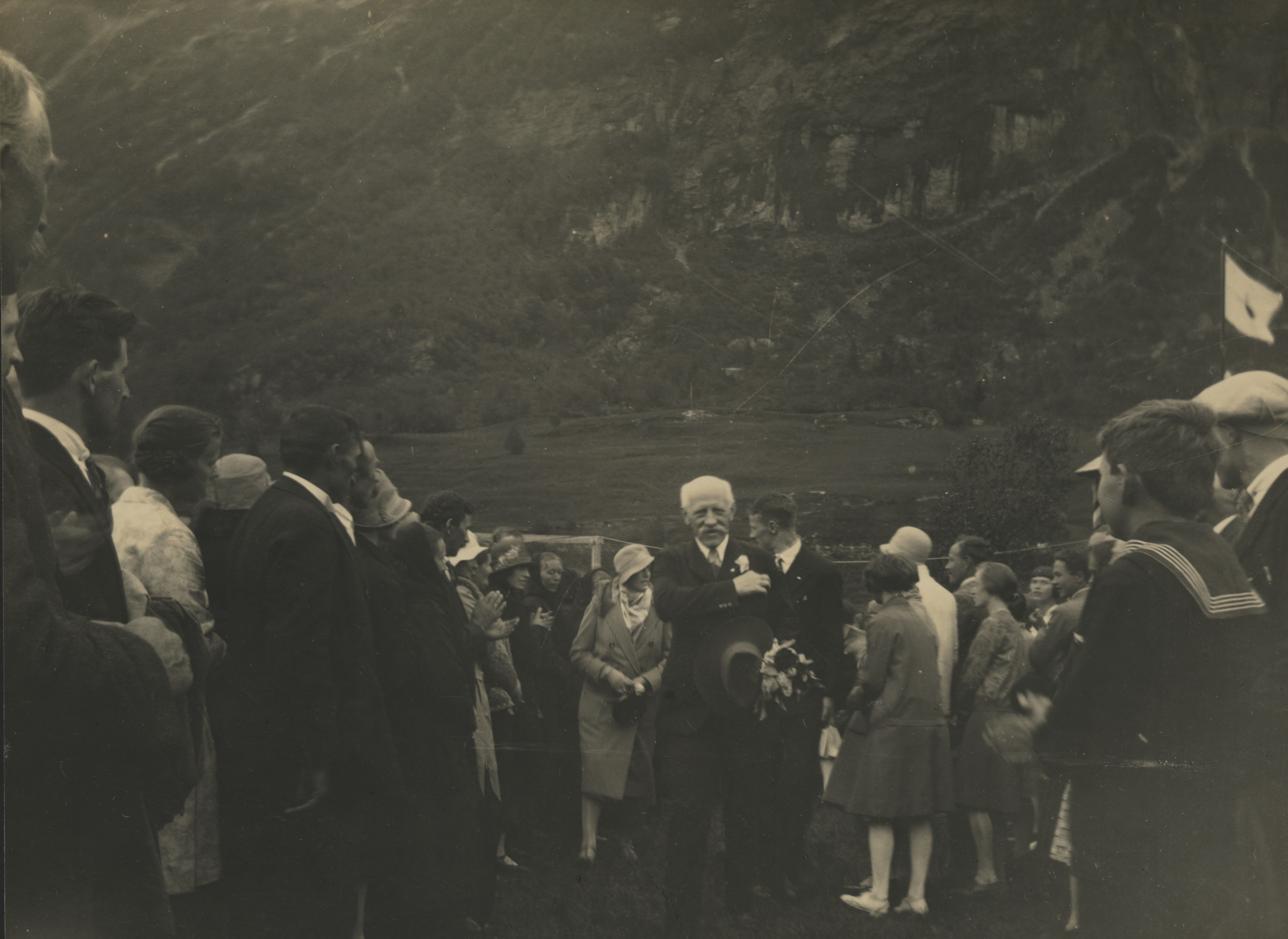
Nansen on his 1929 campaign tour on the ship Stella Polaris, with rallies held from Bergen to Nordkapp.

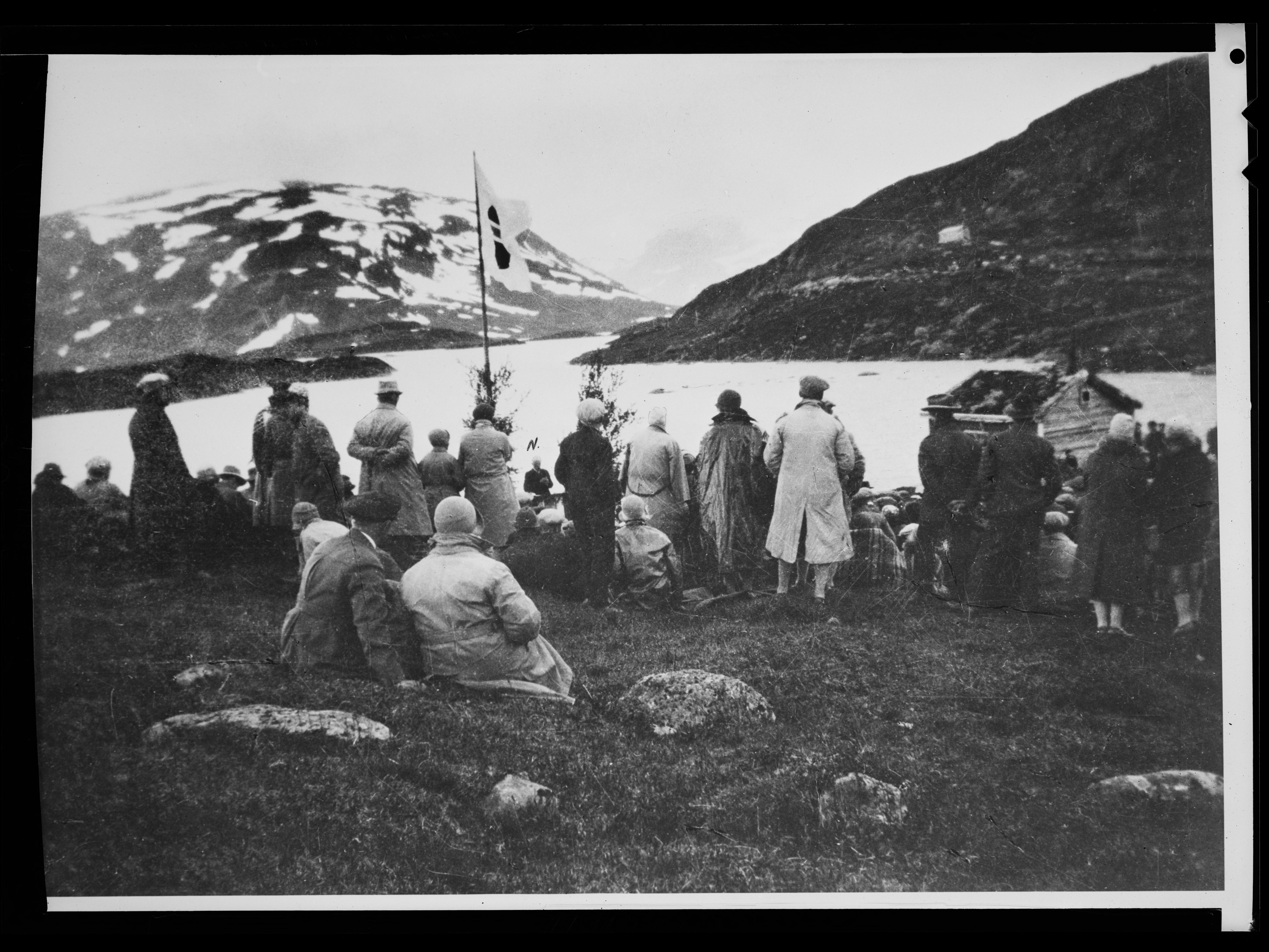
Rally in rural Haukeliseter, with speech by Nansen ("N").

The economic turmoil during and after the First World War caused political instability for the bourgeois (borgerlig) establishment, totalling in 12 governments between 1920 and 1933. Meanwhile, the growing Labour Party had in 1918 adopted the revolutionary programme of the Fagopposisjonen av 1911 faction, a programme it kept until the early 1930s. The old bourgeois establishment could not collaborate to prevent the growth of the Labour Party.

By the initiative of young industrialist Joakim Lehmkuhl, the Fatherland League was co-founded with national hero Fridtjof Nansen and Norway's first Prime Minister Christian Michelsen. Former Prime Minister Jens Bratlie also joined the organisation. The organisation gained particular support from the Free-minded Liberal Party and the Farmers' Party, while it was met with scepticism by the Conservative Party, and largely rejection by the Liberal Party.

The Fatherland League's self-described goal was to be a supporting organisation for the existing bourgeois parties to fight against "marxism" and the revolutionary plans of the labour movement in general. The labour movement in turn saw the organisation as a "seeding ground" for a fascist movement.

=== Growth ===
After the government crisis of 1926 and continued division among the centre-right parties, a "Nansen-petition" was launched by several influential people of different political backgrounds for a national unity government to be led by Nansen, an idea that was eventually endorsed by Nansen himself and by Lehmkuhl. The proposal fell through as Conservative and Liberal politicians reacted coldly to the idea, and quickly came to a new government agreement.

Following a strong surge of support and victory for the Labour Party in the 1927 parliamentary election, the Fatherland League launched a "thousand day election campaign" towards the 1930 parliamentary election, a period which is considered the most important and successful in the history of the movement. The 1930 election resulted in Labour Party setbacks amid record voter turnouts, which the League assigned to its own credit, a view that was echoed by the Labour Party's Haakon Lie and Halvard Lange. The organisation peaked the same year with around 100,000 members and more than 400 local chapters.

=== Party attempt and decline ===
Increasingly seen as a political rival rather than a unifying force by the centre-right parties, the organisation effectively reorganised into a political party in 1933 after pressure from its young activists. At the same time it launched a more radical political program titled "A Norwegian program", and entered into secret, eventually unsuccessful negotiations of a "national block" with the Farmers' Party and the Free-minded People's Party (and briefly Nasjonal Samling which dropped out as it did not consider itself a burgeoiois party). Following the onset of the Great Depression, Lehmkuhl and the party developed an economic ideology in part inspired by the American New Deal social program, emphasising a more planned economy. For the 1936 parliamentary election the party contested electoral lists in a few districts, both independently and together with the Free-minded, but did not win any representation.

The group declined in the late 1930s, partly due to the Labour Party abandoning its revolutionary ideology, and partly as an effect of the Nazi German-friendly attitude exhibited by several of its leading members as segments of the movement came under the influence of Italian fascism and German national socialism.

In 1933, some of its young members marched in "greyshirts" for the first time at a local rally after the uniform had been launched by the party newspaper ABC. The uniform was accompanied by a Fascist salute. Political use of uniforms was banned by the Liberal government the day after the rally, which the League argued was unfair, because according to them, the Workers' Youth League had been allowed to do this for a long time.

In early 1934, an attempt was made by the League and Nasjonal Samling to unify under a national bloc, as differences between the parties at that time were considered marginal. Later that year, negotiations were expanded to the Free-minded Liberal Party and the Farmers' Party, with strong support from the Norwegian Agrarian Association. The Farmers' Party went on to torpedo the negotiations, as they risked being kicked out of the fundraising cooperation between them, the Liberal Party, and the Conservative Party, which they were largely dependent on. They would go on to support the first lasting Labour Party government a couple of months after.

After the German invasion of Norway in April 1940, the remnants of the organisation attempted to establish a political alternative against the Quisling regime. The new chairman, Victor Mogens' secret talks and negotiations with the Germans remained unsuccessful. The organisation, like all other parties but Nasjonal Samling, was banned by Reichskommissar Josef Terboven on 25 September 1940.

The Fatherland League was not reorganised after the war. As the archives of the organisation were burned after its dissolution, limited historical material remains of it despite being the single largest mass movement ever organised on the political right in Norway. Anders Lange, founder of the modern Progress Party, was active as the secretary of the organisation in Kristiansand and in Oslo until 1938.

== Gallery ==
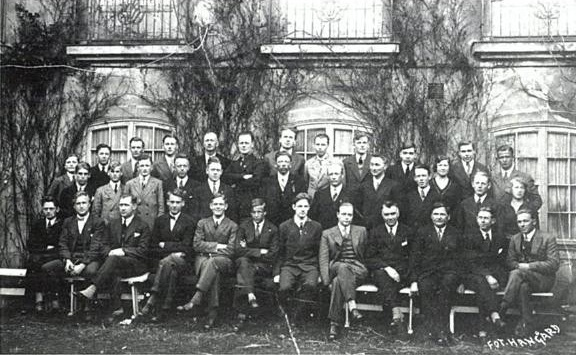
Representatives for the organisation in 1932.

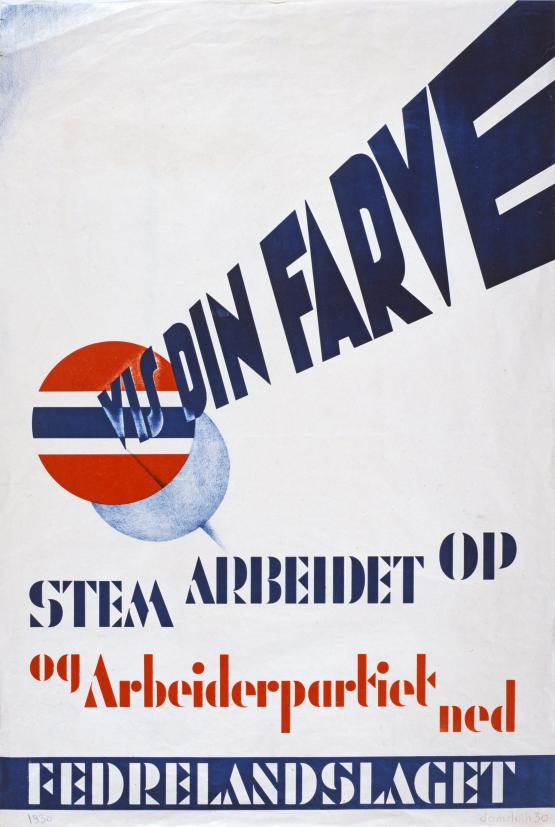
"Show your colour. Vote labour up, and the Labour Party down."

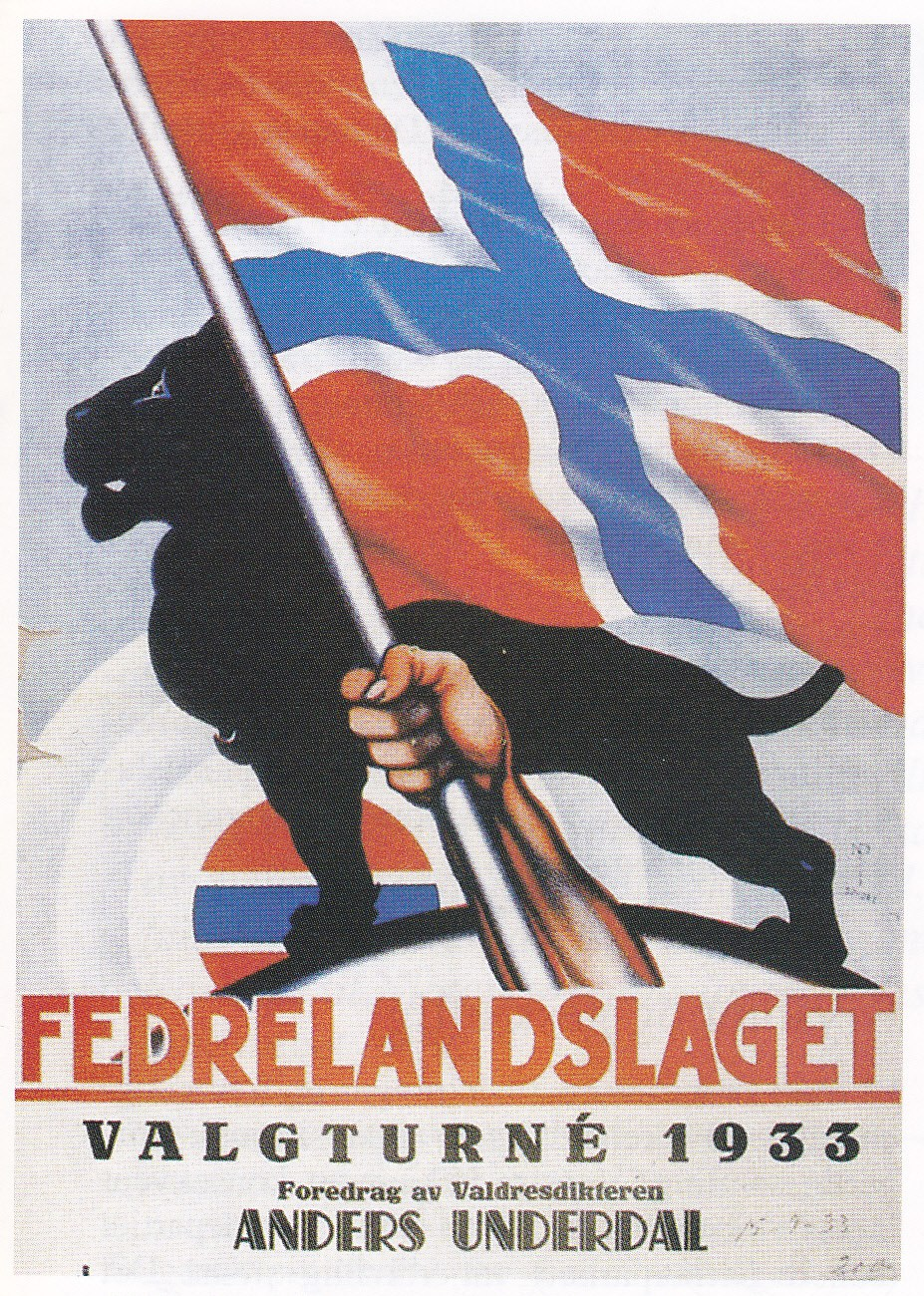
1933 election poster.

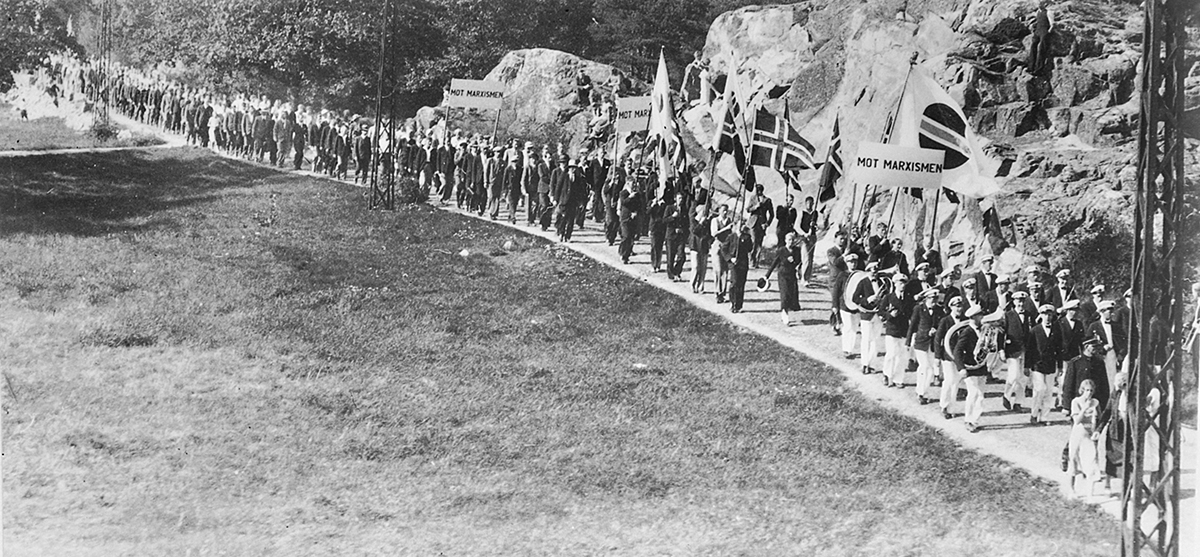
Fatherland League rally under the parole "Against Marxism".

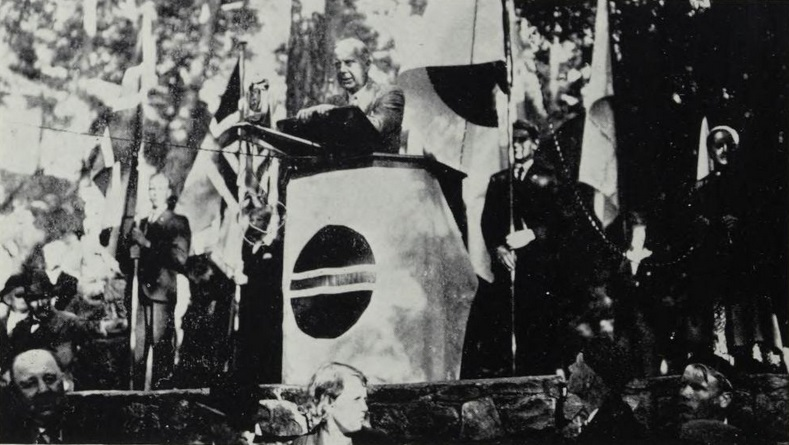
Victor Mogens speaking at a rally in Kristiansand in 1935.

== Electoral results ==
Storting
Date	Votes			Seats		Position	Size
Date	#	%	± pp	#	±	Position	Size
1936	19,236	1.3	New	0 / 150	New	Extra-parliamentary	8th
