= Joacim Tuuri =

Finnish footballer (born 1989)

Personal information
- Date of birth: 16 October 1989 (age 37)
- Place of birth: Vaasa, Finland
- Height: 1.71 m (5 ft 7 1/2 in)
- Position: Midfielder

Senior career*
Years	Team	Apps	(Gls)
2008–2011	Vaasan Palloseura	12	(1)
- * Club domestic league appearances and goals as of 7 August 2010

Joacim Tuuri (born 16 October 1989) was a Finnish footballer who last played for Vaasan Palloseura, a team which compete in the Veikkausliiga.
