= Isabel Meyrelles =

Portuguese sculptor and poet (born 1929)

Isabel Meyrelles (born 1929) is a Portuguese surrealist sculptor and poet. She is the first female Portuguese surrealist.

Born in Matosinhos, Meyrelles set up the Portuguese Surrealist group in Lisbon after meeting Mario Cesariny and Artur do Cruzeiro in 1949. She studied sculpture with Americo Gomes and Antonio Duarte before moving to Paris where she studied at the Sorbonne and the Ecole des Beaux-Arts.

== Poetry ==
- Em voz baixa (In a Low Voice), 1951
- Palavras Nocturnas (Night Words), 1954
- (ed.) Anthologie de poesie portugaise, 1971
- (trans.) Labyrinth du chant by Mário Cesariny de Vasconcelos
- O Rostro Deserto, 1966
