= Joakim Persson =

Joakim Persson may refer to:

- Joakim Persson (ice hockey) (born 1970), Swedish ice hockey player
- Joakim Persson (footballer, born 1975), Swedish football manager and former midfielder
- Joakim Persson (footballer, born 2002), Swedish football winger for Sirius
- Joakim Persson (footballer, born 2007), Swedish football winger for Malmö

== See also ==
- Joacim Persson (born 1971), Swedish singer and songwriter
