= Joakim Borda-Pedreira =

Swedish-Bolivian art historian, art critic, and art collector (born 1977)

Joakim de Borda-Pedreira
- Born: 1977 (age 48–49); Malmö, Sweden
- Education: Lund University, Goldsmith's College (London), Oslo University
- Occupations: Art historian, art critic, curator

Joakim Waskar Olañeta de Borda y Pedreira (born in 1977 in Malmö) is a Swedish-Bolivian art historian, art critic and curator naturalised in Norway. He publishes under the name Joakim Borda-Pedreira.

== Biography ==
He grew up in Lund and studied law, philosophy and art history at Lund University, Goldsmith's college, London, and Oslo University, specialising in European Modernism and Spanish Colonial Art. He was Art Editor of Plaza Magazine (2007–2011), Stockholm, and is the Founding Director of The Boiler Room Gallery in Oslo. Between 2012 and 2015 he was Head Curator of The Arts Festival of North Norway. He was director of several art institutions in Norway, such as the Association of Art Centres in Norway (KIN) and Gallery Format Oslo. Since 2018 he has been Director of RAM Gallery in Oslo. In 2017, Borda-Pedreira co-founded Nordic Institute of Art, a non-profit institution dedicated to promoting art history, together with Norwegian Art Historian Knut Ljøgodt. The institute has since co-organized a number of museum exhibitions in Madrid, Stockholm, Helsinki and other European cities.

As an art historian Borda-Pedreira researches Bolivian colonial painting and has published articles on the Bolivian baroque painter Melchor Pérez Holguín (1660-1732). He has also published on Scandinavian contemporary art.

== Family background ==
Borda-Pedreira has a family background from Argentina, Bolivia, Spain and Germany. He is son of the Argentinian-Swedish professor of ethnology Beatriz Lindqvist (née Pedreira y Lohner). The middlename Olañeta comes from his great-grandparents's family, who are descendants of the Spanish realist general Pedro Antonio de Olañeta.
