= Joakim Karlsson =

Joakim Karlsson may refer to:

- Joakim Karlsson (kickboxer), Swedish kickboxer
- Joakim Karlsson (footballer) (born 1989), Swedish footballer
- Joakim "Jolly" Karlsson, guitarist of the American Metalcore band Bad Omens
