= Francisco Tropa =

Portuguese artist (sculptor)

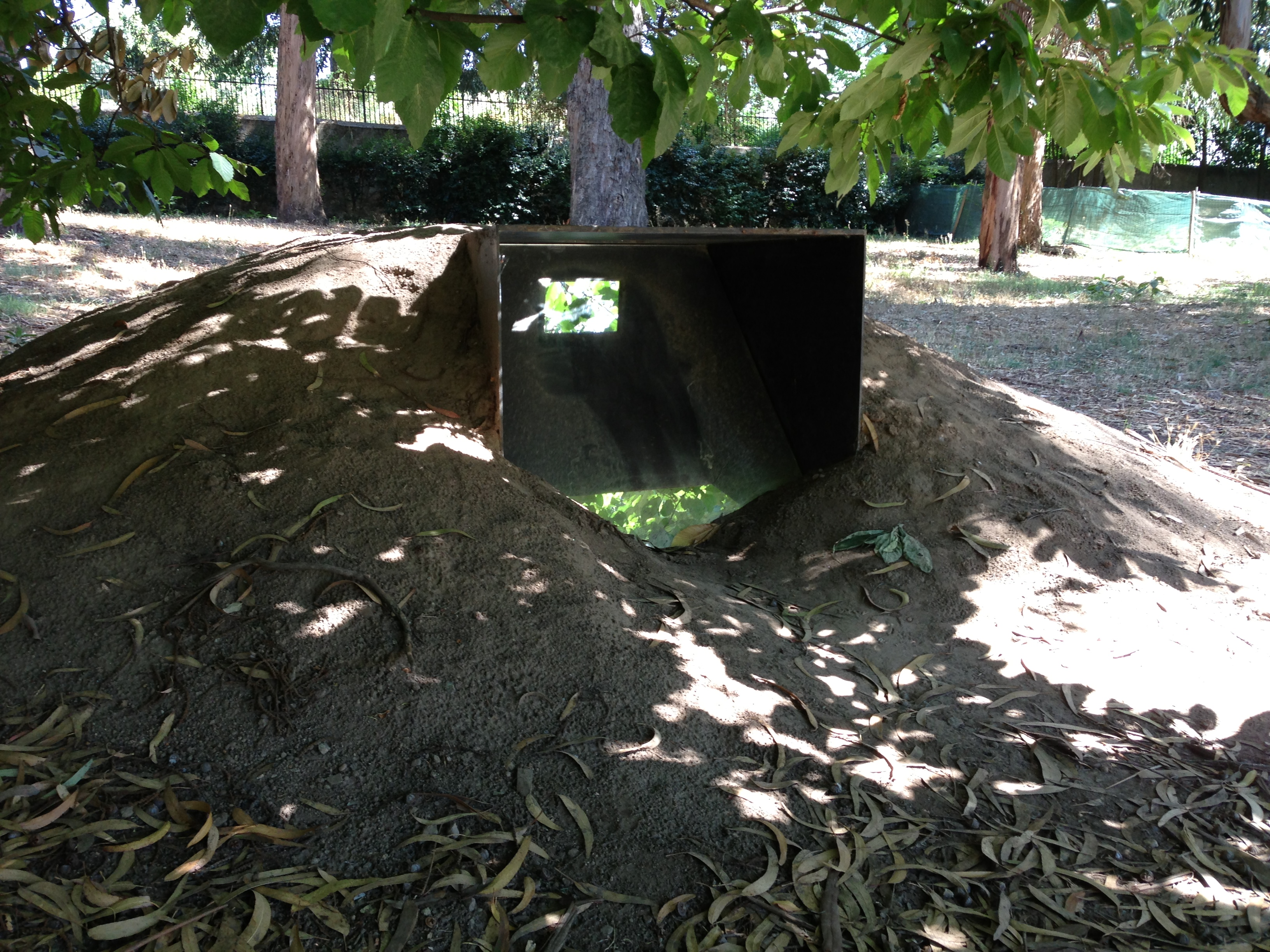
Monte Falso (Tropa) Serralves

Francisco Tropa (born 1968 in Lisbon, Portugal) is a Portuguese sculptor and visual artist. He lives and works in Lisbon.

== Biography ==
Tropa attended the independent art college Ar.Co in Lisbon from 1987 until 1992. In 1992 he received a scholarship from the same institution to study at the Royal College of Arts in London. Between 1995 and 1996, Tropa held a scholarship from the Foundation Alfred Topfel at the Kunstakademie Münster, Germany. From 1996 to 2007, he was a professor in the Department of Sculpture of Ar.Co.

Over the years, Tropa has participated in a number of prominent exhibitions. The artist represented Portugal at the 54th Venice Biennale (2011), but also took part in the Istanbul Biennial (2011), Manifesta in Ljubljana (2000), the Melbourne Biennial (1999) and the Bienal de São Paulo in collaboration with Lourdes Castro (1998).

== Work ==
Since his first solo exhibition in 1991, Francisco Tropa has since been building his work around the fusion of naturally occurring phenomena, with an interest for the mythical and unexplained, incorporating historical and archeological elements. Tropa's work mixes genres, making use of sculpture, architecture, painting, photography, cinema and theater. The artist relies mostly on natural materials in his installations, incorporating glass, metals, stone, wood, insects or sand.

Tropa’s oeuvre is defined by a process of excavation, manipulating the passage of time to reveal new faces of known objects through the mechanical harnessing of natural processes. This approach can be seen, for example, in the Scenario projections, a long-standing series that merges the intricate technical elements of an electrical projection device with the mysterious nature of the origin objects, actively engaging the viewer in a timeless narrative that investigates questions of transience, temporality and transformation. Reproducing the image of various organic and inorganic objects, such as an hourglass, a dead fly, a small glass or even droplets of water descending down a thread, the devices duplicate the experience of the passage of time through the introduction of unexpected not-quite mirroring images using a simple machine. For example, one such piece titled Lantern projects the image of an hourglass onto a plaster screen, the device duplicating the experience of the passage of time with every grain of sand whose fall in unregulated intervals is reflected into the exhibition space. The viewer is able to examine the physical origin object as well the machine through which it is reproduced, and to interact with a reinvented reflection into the exhibition space.

A similar approach can be seen in another one of his seminal works, titled STAE – shorthand for Sunken Treasures of Ancient Egypt. The complex installation links three individual chambers: “the underwater section”, “the looted chamber” and finally the “Terra platonica”. Each space contains its own narrative which spills over into the next, creating a seemingly incoherent but deeply interconnected collection of individual works, which come together into a single whole. Raising questions of metamorphosis, reconstruction and the fleeting human experience, the individual rooms contain unique storylines referencing everything from scientific history and early alchemist discoveries to Native American burial rites. An assemblage of geometric forms and automated appliances, the turbulent array of shapes and textures that make up each space take the viewer on an archeological exploratory mission. Shaped by the writings of Paul Scherbert and Raymond Roussel, the piece creates a unity out of seemingly incompatible elements, such as the floating assembly of a cube and two spheres that make up Le songe de Scipion or an ethnographic film depicting a Native American building a box in L’influence Americaine.

== Exhibitions ==
=== Selected solo exhibitions ===
- 2019: O Pirgo de Chaves / The Pyrgus from Chaves, Fundação Calouste Gulbenkian, Lisbon, Portugal
- 2018: Performance Scripta, L’invitation aux musées, Centre national de la danse, Paris, France
- 2018: Le Grand Café, La Moustache cachée dans la barbe. Le Grand Café, Saint Nazaire, France
- 2018: Performance Gigante. Festival MOVE. Centre Pompidou, Paris, France
- 2017: La moustache cachée dans la barbe, Galerie Jocelyn Wolff, Paris, France
- 2017: O bigode escondido na barba (La moustache cachée dans la barbe), Fundação Víctor e Graça Carmona e Costa, Lisbon, Portugal
- 2016: Cinema, Appleton Square, Lisbon, Portugal
- 2016: Ladri, Galleria Alessandra Bonomo, Roma, Italy
- 2015: TSAE, Musée régional d’art contemporain Languedoc-Roussillon, Sérignan, France
- 2015: Sim Não – Oui Non, Moulins de Paillard, Poncé sur le Loir, France
- 2014-2015: TSAE, Pavilhão Branco - Museu de Lisboa, Lisboa, Portugal
- 2014: Arénaire, Galerie Jocelyn Wolff, Paris, France
- 2013: Tsae, Trésors submergés de l’ancienne Egypte, La verrière, Fondation d’entreprise Hermès, Bruxelles, Belgium
- 2013: Gigante, Performance au Palais de Tokyo, Paris, France
- 2013: Francisco Tropa, Galerija Gregor Podar, Berlin, Germany
- 2013: Terra platonica, Caterina Tognon, Palazzo da Ponte di calle del Dose, Venice, Italy
- 2012: Museu, Galeria Quadrado Azul, Porto, Portugal.
- 2012: Flowers, Galeria Quadrado Azul, Porto, Portugal.
- 2012: Stela, Fundação Leal Rios, Lisbon, Portugal.
- 2011: Scenario, Pavilhão de Portugal, La Biennale di Venezia, 54 Exposizione Internazionale d’Arte, Venice, Italy
- 2011: Tali, Galeria Quadrado Azul, Porto, Portugal.
- 2011: Scenario, Official Portuguese Representation, 54th Venice Biennale, Italy.
- 2011: Literal, Circular – Festival de Artes Performativas, Vila do Conde, Portugal (with Laurent Pichaud).
- 2010: Scripta, Galeria Quadrado Azul, Lisbon, Portugal.
- 2010: Farol, Natureza Morta, Galeria Quadrado Azul, Lisbon, Portugal.
- 2010: Giant, Auditório do Museu de Arte Contemporânea de Serralves, Porto, Portugal.
- 2010: O vapor que se eleva do arroz enquanto coze, Auditório do Museu de Arte Contemporânea, Serralves,
- 2010: Porto/ Beursschouwburg, Brussels, Belgium/ Appleton Square, Lisbon, Portugal (with Osso Exótico).
- 2009: Culturgest, Lisbon, Portugal.
- 2009: Galeria Quadrado Azul, Porto, Portugal.
- 2009: Galería Distrito Quatro, Madrid, Spain.
- 2008: Festival Trama, Porto, Portugal.
- 2008: Galerie Jocelyn Wolff
- 2008: Tesouros Submersos do Antigo Egipto, Chiado 8 Arte Contemporânea, Lisbon, Portugal.
- 2008: The Assembly of Euclid (final), Galeria Quadrado Azul, Porto, Portugal.
- 2007: The Assembly of Euclid, Matadero, Madrid, Spain.
- 2007: The Cyclist’s Trance, Livre Circulação: Serralves no Algarve, Convento de Santo António, Loulé, Portugal.
- 2007: Traço sobre um muro, Circular – Festival de Artes Performativas, Vila do Conde, Portugal.
- 2007: Galeria Quadrado Azul, Lisbon, Portugal.
- 2006: A Marca do Seio, Culturgest, Porto, Portugal.
- 2006: The Assembly of Euclid: The Cyclist’s Trance, Galeria Quadrado Azul, Porto, Portugal.
- 2006: Yes No, Auditório do Museu de Serralves, Porto, Portugal (with other artists).
- 2006: Figura sentada; Homem em erecção; Tiro inflectido; O Gigante, Teatro Rivoli, Porto, Portugal (with André Maranha).

=== Selected group exhibitions ===
- 2018: Sculpter (faire à l’atelier), FRAC Bretagne, Rennes, France
- 2018: Estudos di Labirinto. Museu Nacional de Etnologia, Lisbon, Portugal
- 2018: Una fornace a Marsiglia: Cirva, LE STANZE DEL VETRO, Venice, Italy
- 2017: O Tempo Inscrito - Memória, Hiato e Projeção, quARTel, Largo de Sant’Ana, Abrantes, Portugal
- 2017: The House of Dust, CNEAI, Pantin, France
- 2017: Vantablack, Galerie Jocelyn Wolff, Paris, France
- 2017: Palaeolithic to Contemporary, Icons and Tools, Cahn AG, Basel, Switzerland
- 2017: Collection. Remonter le temps, FRAC Bretagne, Rennes, France
- 2017: La Pergola. Nouvel accrochage des collections, MRAC, Sérignan, France
- 2017: Über das Füger der Dinge - Par raccroc, Galerie Jocelyn Wolff, Paris, France
- 2016: Herdar o Vento / Inherit the wind, Eugenio de Almeida, Evora, Portugal
- 2016: átrio e peristilo da casa dos amores dourados, Vera Cortez Art Agency, Lisbon, Portugal
- 2016: Shadows, masks and pupes from the puppet museum, Torreao Nascente da Coordoaria Nacional, Lisbon, Portugal
- 2015: The Secret and Abiding Politics of Stones, Casa del Lago UNAM, Mexico
- 2015: Anatomie de L’Automate (Anatomies of the Automaton), La Panacée, Centre de culture contemporaine, Montpellier, France
- 2015: Twist the real, Plataforma Revolver, Lisbon, Portugal
- 2015: Eppur si muove, MUDAM, Luxembourg
- 2015: Anche le sculture muoiono, Palazzo Strozzi, Florence, Italy
- 2015: Group show, Galerie Jocelyn Wolff, Paris, France
- 2014: The Promise of Multiple Temporaries, Parc Saint Léger Centre d’art contemporain, Pougues-les-Eaux, France
- 2013-2014: J’ouvre les yeux et tu es là - Collection MUDAM, MUDAM, Luxembourg
- 2013: Arte y Optica, Fundacion Telefonica, Lima, Peru
- 2013: Des gestes de la pensée, Fondation d’entreprise Hermès, Bruxelles, Belgium
- 2013: L’instinct oublié, Gallery Jocelyn Wolff exhibits at gallery Labor, Mexico City
- 2013: Nouvelles impressions de Raymond Roussel, Palais de Tokyo, Paris
- 2012: Ateliers de Rennes - biennale d’art contemporain, Rennes, France.
- 2012: Out of range, Roma Contemporary, Rome, Italy.
- 2012: knell dobre glas, Galeria Quadrado Azul, Lisbon/ Porto, Portugal.
- 2012: Locus Solus. Impressões de Raymond Roussel, Museu de Arte Contemporânea de Serralves, Porto, Portugal.
- 2012: 3 moscas, Auditório do Museu de Serralves, Porto, Portugal (with Pedro Morais, Jorge Queiroz,
- 2012: André Maranha and Bonecos de Santo Aleixo).
- 2011: Locus Solus. Impresiones de Raymond Roussel, Museo Nacional Centro de Arte Reina Sofia, Madrid, Spain.
- 2011: Untitled, 12th Istanbul Biennial, Turkey.
- 2008: Avenida 211, Lisbon, Portugal.
- 2008: Articulações, Fábrica da Cerveja, Faro, Portugal.
- 2008: Nota de encomenda, Livraria Assírio & Alvim, Lisbon, Portugal.
- 2007: Portugal Agora – À Propos des Lieux d’Origine, MUDAM, Luxembourg
- 2000: Manifesta 3, Ljubljana, Slovenia
- 1999: Signs of Life, Melbourne International Biennial, Australia
- 1998: XXIV São Paulo Biennial, Brazil
