= Joakim Nilsson =

Joakim Nilsson may refer to:

- Joakim Nilsson (footballer, born 1966), Swedish footballer
- Joakim Nilsson (footballer, born 1985), Swedish footballer
- Joakim Nilsson (footballer, born 1994), Swedish footballer
- Joakim Nilsson (javelin thrower) (born 1971), Swedish javelin thrower
