= Isabel Laginhas =

Portuguese artist (1942–2018)

- Born: 1942; Lisbon, Portugal
- Died: August 18, 2018; Lisbon
- Occupations: Artist, art teacher

Isabel Laginhas (1942 – 2018) was a Portuguese geometric-abstractionist artist and art teacher.

== Biography ==
Isabel Laginhas was born in Lisbon in 1942. She graduated in Painting from the Escola Secundária Artística António Arroio (António Arroio School of Decorative Arts) and from the Lisbon School of Fine Arts, now the Faculty of Fine Arts at the University of Lisbon. She also took a course to study colour.

Laginhas taught drawing at Lisbon's Francisco Arruda School and tapestry at the António Arroio School from 1971 but, following the Carnation Revolution in 1974 which overthrew the right-wing Estado Novo government, the school was closed down. Among her early students at the Francisco Arruda school, in 1971–72, was the Portuguese prime minister António Costa. In an obituary he wrote that none of his teachers had been so important in his life and education and that he particularly remembered her energy and smile.

From 1970 she dedicated herself to research into modern tapestry, and she was a recipient of a scholarship from the Calouste Gulbenkian Foundation in the years of 1976, 1977, 1982 and 1991. She held several exhibitions in Portugal and in other countries. She illustrated several children's books, poetry and short stories and designed costumes for the theatre. Over her career her work evolved from neo-figurative art to geometric abstractionism.

Laginhas was one of the founders in 1970 of the artists' studios at Coruchéus in the Alvalade neighbourhood of Lisbon. This was the first such atelier to be created in Lisbon and is known as the Coruchéus Plastic Arts Centre. Between 1974 and 1977 she belonged to the Portuguese Commission that decided on the appropriate age for children to watch films and shows.

Isabel Laginhas died on 18 August 2018 in Lisbon.
