= Joakim Larsson (researcher) =

Swedish researcher (born 1969)

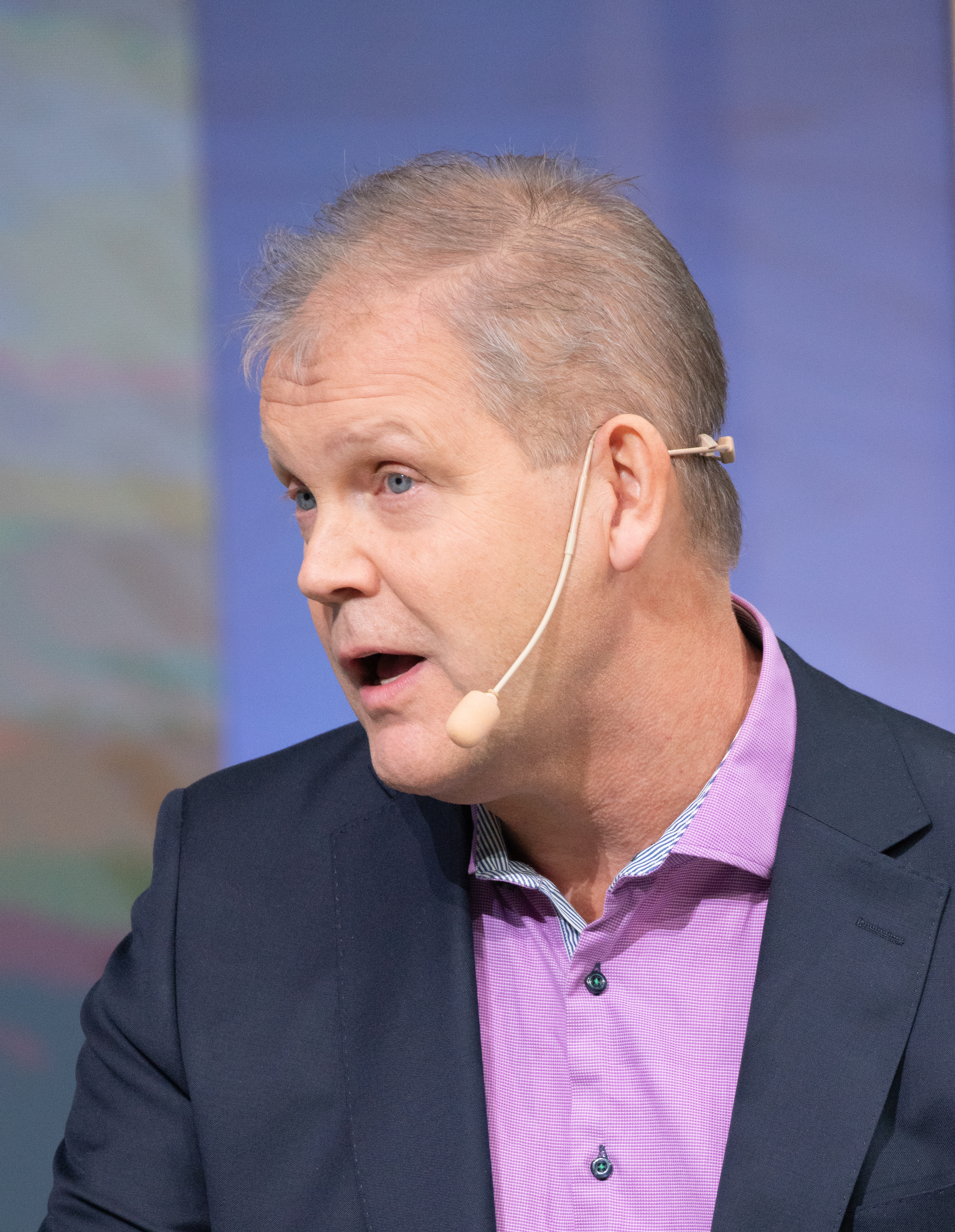
- Larsson at 2024 Nobel Week
- Occupations: Researcher, professor

Joakim Larsson (born 1969, Ljungby, Sweden) is a Swedish researcher primarily known for his studies on pharmaceuticals and antibiotic resistance in the environment. Since 2012, Larsson is a professor of environmental pharmacology at the Department of Infectious Diseases within the Institute of Biomedicine at Sahlgrenska Academy, University of Gothenburg.

Since 2016, he is also director of the Center for Antibiotic Resistance Research (CARe) at the University of Gothenburg.

== Research ==
Larsson's discovery that ethinylestradiol contributed to the feminization of fish in 1999 was one of the triggering factors for today's widespread concern about pharmaceuticals in the environment.

His discovery of significant antibiotic emissions from pharmaceutical manufacturing in India has gained significant attention, including in several documentary films.

This and subsequent research studies from Larsson's research group, including threshold values for emissions, have led to various societal measures, including:

- A Global WHO Standard to Limit Emissions from Antibiotic Production: The World Health Organization (WHO) has introduced new global guidelines aimed at reducing pollution caused by antibiotic manufacturing. The guidelines focus on establishing standards to mitigate the environmental impact of antibiotic production, which can contribute to antimicrobial resistance.
- Two Points (76, 91) on Emission Limits for Antibiotic Production in a UN Declaration: The United Nations has addressed the need for emission controls in antibiotic production within its recent declaration on antimicrobial resistance. Points 76 and 91 specifically highlight the commitment to setting emission standards to curb pollution and address resistance risks associated with antibiotic manufacturing.
- A proposed Indian law to limit emissions
- Voluntary commitments from many of the world's largest pharmaceutical companies to reduce industrial antibiotic emissions and the development of an international emissions standard.
- The introduction of environmental criteria in the procurement of pharmaceuticals in Sweden and Norway.
- A revision of the Swedish model for generic substitution of drugs that takes into account companies' emissions control.
- Several UN organizations, the European Parliament, and the G7 have expressed an international need for similar measures, including increased transparency in the pharmaceutical production chain.

Joakim Larsson has published over 200 scientific articles. Since 2018, he has been among the top 1% most highly cited researchers in the world according to Web of Science

== Awards and honors ==
Larsson was the recipient of the first Swedish award for effective research communication (2023), established by Örebro University and the Hamrin Foundation. He also received the Eric K. Fernström Prize for young, particularly promising, and successful researchers in 2012.
