= Joakim Fohlman =

Swedish entrepreneur and activist (born 1979)

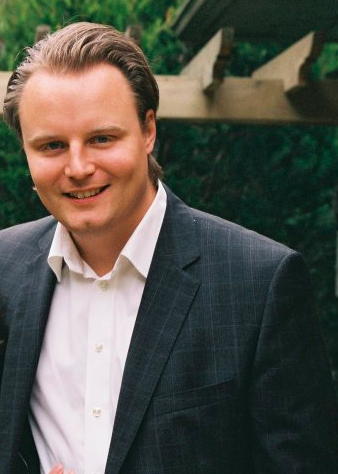
- Born: July 19, 1979 (age 45); Sweden
- Occupation: Entrepreneur, activist

Joakim Fohlman (born 19 July 1979) is an entrepreneur and activist best known for his initiative to help those affected by crime in Sweden, including the movements Safer Uppsala County and the Foundation for a Safer Sweden. Fohlman's crusade against crime was motivated by his own experience of being attacked.

== Early life and career ==
Fohlman was born in 1979 in Uppsala County, Sweden. He started his first business, an advertising agency, at 19 years old and when he was 25 his business grossed over a million dollars. By this time he had also started an internet technology business and the tourist magazine for the city where he lived.

== Attack ==
Fohlman was returning from dinner at a restaurant with his girlfriend and some friends when some men started bothering his girlfriend. Fohlman asked the men to stop, and one of them punched him in the nose three times. Fohlman went to the hospital where he was told to come back after the weekend. Then he went to the police and was told that it would take several weeks to process his complaint. He received no information about his right to legal counsel or victim services. "The news left me wondering just how meaningful a police report was", Fohlman said. When he was finally admitted to the hospital, it turned out that he had a broken nose, broken zygomatic bone, broken fundus, and broken cheek bones which required surgery. Fohlman was left with a permanent disability in the form of face numbness and nose distortion that makes breathing difficult. The restaurant posted photos of that evening's guests, and Fohlman was able to identify one of them as his attacker. His attacker did not show up for questioning. Fohlman's case remained in the Court of Appeals for four years. After a trial in which Fohlman believes his rights as victim were not respected, the attacker was acquitted. "It really feels like a worse violation than the actual beating", Fohlman said.

== Safer Uppsala County ==
Working with Magnus Lindgren, director of the Victims Unit of the Police in Uppsala county, Fohlman launched Safer Uppsala County to protect crime victims from the kind of abuse and neglect that he experienced. Safer Uppsala County is sponsored by several businesses including Länsförsäkringar, Swedbank, and McDonald's. The organization was first steered by a committee chaired by then Governor Anders Björk. It is now chaired by the current governor. The organization is under the supervision of the police, but it maintains an independent budget.

== Foundation for Safer Sweden ==
The Foundation for Safer Sweden grew out of Safer Uppsala County. Police departments around the country expressed interest in developing programs similar to that of Safer Uppsala County but did not do so. Fohlman decided to do it on a national scale himself and created Safer Sweden, which performs research and training on crime prevention and security. It provides an ombudsman for victims of crime and has also developed safety guides. The organization is supported by the Swedish Trade Federation, Swedish Housing, and the Student Association. It has to date helped over 100,000 people in Sweden.
