= Deolinda Fonseca =

Portuguese artist (1954 – 2022)

- Born: 1954; Porto, Portugal
- Died: 2022 (aged 67–68); Copenhagen, Denmark
- Education: Faculty of the Fine Arts of the University of Porto (1979) The Royal Danish Academy of Fine Arts (1985)
- Occupation: Portuguese painter

Deolinda Fonseca (1954 – 2022) was a Portuguese painter who lived and worked in Denmark from 1979 until her death in 2022. Her oil paintings often combined abstract themes with realistic imagery. Her portraits integrated elements of abstract expressionism.

== Early life and education ==
Fonseca was born in 1954 in Porto, Portugal. She graduated with a degree in painting and sculpture from the Faculty of Fine Arts of the University of Porto in 1979. In 1985, she completed supplemental studies at the Royal Danish Academy of Fine Arts in Copenhagen, Denmark. Fonseca resided in Denmark for most of her life.

== Career ==
Fonseca exhibited her works in Denmark, Portugal, and other European countries. Her paintings are part of collections in museums, embassies, and private galleries across Europe and the United States. In 2002, she was awarded the Order of Prince Henry ("Ordem do Infante D. Henrique"), a Portuguese national honor.

Her artistic style combined abstract themes with realistic details, exploring different emotional and conceptual subjects. Fonseca's works include standalone abstract pieces and portraits that incorporated elements of abstract expressionism.

== Exhibitions ==
- 2014 - “No Reino das Aparições,” São Mamede Galeria de Arte, Lisboa (Portugal)
- Vale do Lobo Art Gallery (in collaboration with Galeria São Mamede) (Portugal)
- 2013 - Lyngby Kunstforening (Denmark)
- 2011 - Borup House of Culture (Denmark)
- 2010 - São Mamede Galeria de Arte, Lisbon: ”Paisagens Da Mente” (Portugal)
- Galleri Nybro: "Danish Portraits" (Denmark)
- Lyngby Central Library (Denmark)
- Gallery Copenhagen (Denmark)
- 2009 - Centro Cultural Português, Instituto Camoes: “Flutuaçoes” (Luxembourg)
- Gallery Shorashim, Instituto Camões: “Mind’s Eye“ (Israel)
- Rappaport Hall: "Behind the Clouds" (Israel)
- 2008 - Danish Energy Agency (Denmark)
- Birkeroed High School (Denmark)
- 2007 São Mamede Galeria de Arte, O'Porto: ”Sincronismo do Olhar” (Portugal)
- Lyngby Town Hall (Denmark)
- Dyrup A/S (Denmark)
- 2006 - São Mamede Galeria de Arte, Lisbon: ”Topologia Cromatica” (Portugal)
- Birkeroed Kunstforening (Denmark)
- Danish Ministry of Food, Agriculture and Fisheries (Denmark)
- 2005 - Jyllands Postens galleri (Denmark)
- Hvidovre Hospital (Denmark)
- Gallery Copenhagen (Denmark)
- Deloitte & Touche (Denmark)
- 2004 - Galeria Simbolo (Portugal)
- 2003 - Skovbo Town Hall (Denmark)
- Galeria Municipal de Albufeira (Portugal)
- Illums Bolighus (Denmark)
- 2002 - Centro Cultural Português, Instituto Camões: “Memoria – 25 de Abril” (Luxembourg)
- Radiometer Medical ApS (Denmark)
- Danish Energy Agency (Denmark)
- Sadolin Akzo Nobel (Denmark & Sweden)
- DRTV (Denmark)
- 2001 - Museu Casa Oficina António Carneiro: “Pintura Sobre Seda”, "O’Porto Cultural Capitol" (Portugal)
- Instituto Camões, Brussels (Belgium)
- IT2000 (Denmark)
- DRTV (Denmark)
- 2000 - Tryg-Baltica A/S (Denmark)
- 1998 - USA Embassy (Denmark)
- Galleri Dragehoej (Denmark)
- 1997/99 - Louis Poulsen A/S (Denmark)
- 1996 - Hvidovre Town Hall (Denmark)
- 1995/96/99/2001 - Copenhagen Central Library (Denmark)
- 1995 - The Royal Library of Denmark (Denmark)
- 1993 - Galeria da Cooperativa Árvore (Portugal)
- Dentists Association (Denmark)
- Galleri Dragehoej (Denmark)
- 1992 - Lundbeck A/S (Denmark)
- 1991 - Ishoej Town Hall (Denmark)
- 1990/92/95/97 Sadolin Akzo Nobel A/S (Denmark)
- 1987 - Galleri Secher (Denmark)
- 1987 - World Health Organization (Denmark)
- 1986/87 - Danske Bank (Denmark)
- 1985 - Moestings Hus (Denmark)
- 1984 - World Health Organization (Denmark)

== Reception ==
Fonseca's work received recognition from critics and art writers, including Danish art writer Sinne Lundgaard Rasmussen and Portuguese art critic Laura Castro.

== Legacy ==
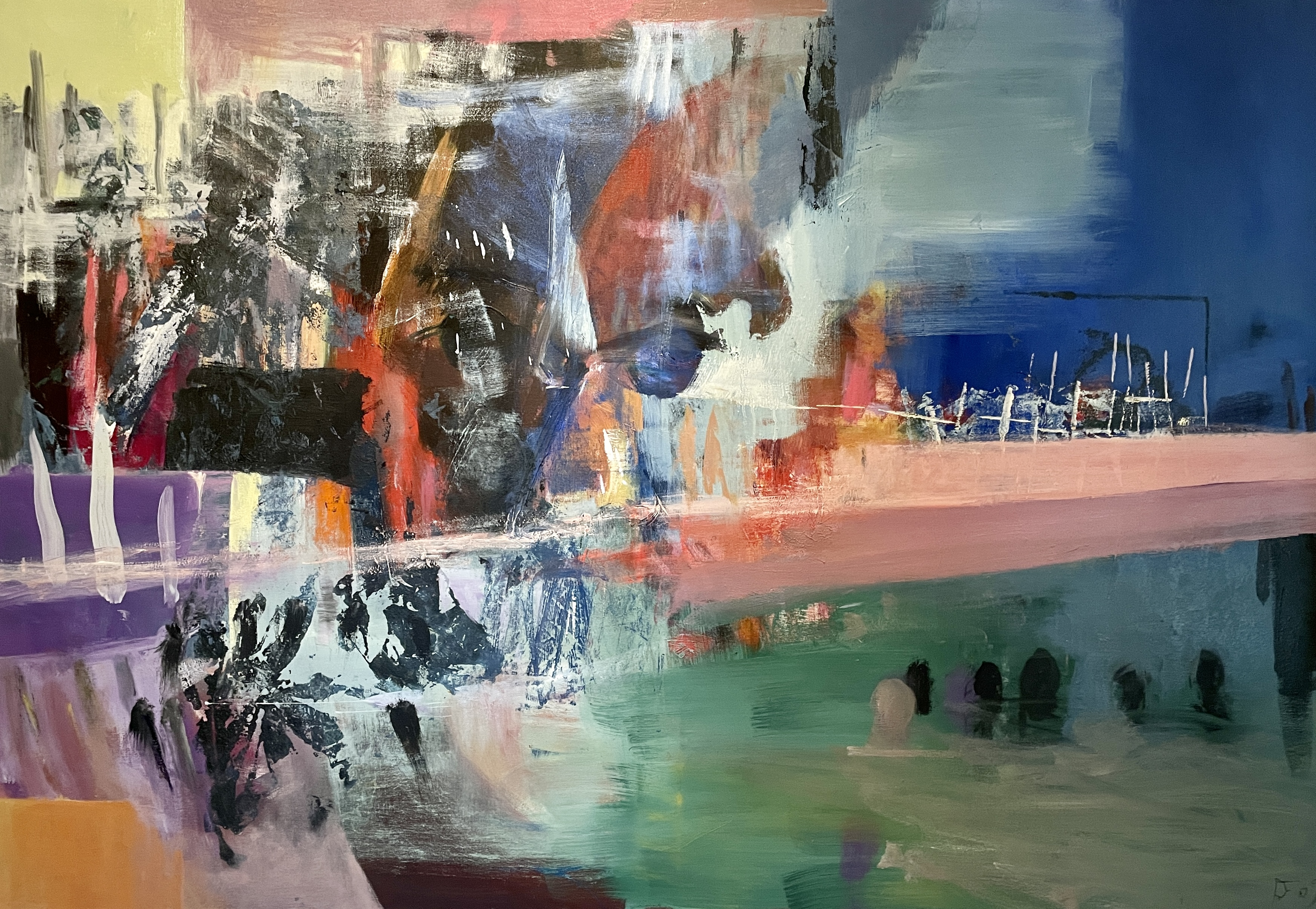
Deolinda Fonseca, Waveform Collapse (The Survivors), oil on canvas, 2009 (private collection)

Her paintings are exhibited posthumously in various collections.

== Sources ==
Based in part on a translation of an entry to Deolinda Fonseca from the Portuguese Wikipedia.
