= Joakim Halvarsson =

Swedish ski mountaineer (born 1972)

Personal information
- Born: 12 March 1972 (age 54) Östersund, Sweden

Sport
- Sport: Skiing

Joakim Halvarsson (born 12 March 1972) is a Swedish ski mountaineer.

Halvarsson was born in Östersund and has been member of the national team since 2006. He started ski mountaineering in 2000 and competed first in the Swedish Cup Ski Mountaineering in 2005. Together with Patrik Nordin, André Jonsson and John Bergstedt, he placed sixth in the relay event of the 2007 European Championship of Ski Mountaineering.
