= Joakim Eyde =

Norwegian footballer (born 1991)

Personal information
- Full name: Joakim Leinonen Eyde
- Date of birth: 12 December 1991 (age 34)
- Position: Defender

Youth career
- Nesodden
- –2007: Vålerenga
- 2008: Stabæk
- 2008: Vålerenga
- 2009: Fredrikstad

Senior career*
Years	Team	Apps	(Gls)
2009	Nesodden		
2010–11	Sarpsborg 08	23	(0)
2012	Nesodden		
2015–2017	Skjetten		

International career
2006	Norway U-15	4	(0)
2007	Norway U-16	10	(1)
2008	Norway U-17	7	(1)
- * Club domestic league appearances and goals

Joakim Eyde (born 12 December 1991) is a retired Norwegian football defender.

He hails from Nesodden. He went on to youth football for Vålerenga, made his debut as a Norway youth international and trialled with Tottenham Hotspur. In 2008 he joined Stabæk, only to rejoin Vålerenga in the autumn of 2008. In 2009 he tried his luck in senior football with Nesodden IF, only to play the latter half of the season for Fredrikstad's junior team. Despite falling short of the youth international squads, he was signed by 1. divisjon team Sarpsborg 08.

He played half the games in the 2010 season, which ended in promotion, and then 8 Eliteserien games in 2011. In 2012 he rejoined Nesodden, and after a break from football, he later played for Skjetten SK.
