= Maluda (artist) =

Portuguese painter (1934–1999)

- Born: Maria de Lourdes Ribeiro; 15 November 1934; Nova Goa Goa, Portuguese India
- Died: 10 February 1999 (aged 64); Lisbon, Portugal
- Burial place: Prazeres Cemetery
- Occupation: Painter
- Awards: Grand Officer of the Order of Prince Henry

Maria de Lourdes Ribeiro (15 November 1934 – 10 February 1999), better known as Maluda, was a Portuguese painter. Her work was mainly based on portraits and city views, namely the painting of urban landscapes, windows and various other architectural elements. She achieved particular popularity as a designer of Portuguese postage stamps.

== Early life ==
Maria de Lourdes Ribeiro, known as Maluda, was born on 15 November 1934 in the city of Nova Goa, in what at the time was the Portuguese colony of Goa. Her father was an army officer posted there. She started painting as a self-taught portraitist after she moved with her family to Lourenço Marques (now Maputo), in the former Portuguese colony of Mozambique, where she lived from 1948. It was there that she formed, with four other artists, the painting group Os Independentes, which exhibited in 1961, 1962 and 1963. Her studio became a focal point of the social life of artists in the city. She was an all-round sports enthusiast, winning prizes in motor rallies, and taking part in horse riding, fencing, volleyball, basketball, and golf. In 1963 Maluda obtained a scholarship from the Calouste Gulbenkian Foundation and travelled to the Portuguese capital of Lisbon.

== Career ==
Between 1964 and 1967 Maluda lived in Paris on a Gulbenkian scholarship. There she studied at the Académie de la Grande Chaumière with Jean Aujame and Michel Rodde. During her stay in Paris, she interacted with other artists, including Maria Helena Vieira da Silva and her husband, the Hungarian painter Árpád Szenes. It was at that time that she became interested in portraits. Over the years she would paint famous Portuguese, such as the actress Ana Zanatti, the fado singer Amália Rodrigues, the writer and diplomat Aquilino Ribeiro, the prime minister and president Mário Soares, and the Portuguese Communist Party leader Álvaro Cunhal, among others. However, Maluda is better known for her compositions in a geometrical style based on urban landscape, particularly paintings of windows and roofs inspired by those of Lisbon.

In 1969 Maluda held her first solo exhibition at the Diário de Notícias gallery in Lisbon. In 1973 she held a major solo exhibition at the Gulbenkian Foundation in Lisbon, which was very successful, registering around 15,000 visitors. Between 1976 and 1978, she was once again a Gulbenkian Foundation grantee, studying in London and Switzerland. In 1979 she held an exhibition at the Gulbenkian Foundation in Paris. In 1981 she published an autobiography entitled Maluda, with a preface by Maria Helena Vieira da Silva. In 1984, she had solo exhibitions in New York City, Washington, D.C. and Dallas, as well as Lisbon. From 1985 onwards, Maluda was invited to make several series of stamps for CTT Correios de Portugal, S.A., the Portuguese post office. In 1994, Lisbon was the European Capital of Culture and in this context she held a solo exhibition at the Centro Cultural de Belém near Lisbon. In 1998 she held her last solo exhibition, Os Selos de Maluda (Maluda's stamps). While having considerable popularity amongst the public she was, to a certain extent, ostracised by other artists who considered her style to be too popular.

== Awards and honours ==
- In 1979 Maluda won the "painting prize" from the National Academy of Fine Arts in Lisbon.
- Two of Maluda's stamps won prizes at the World Government Stamp Printers Conference, in Washington, DC, in 1987, and in Périgueux, France, in 1989, when she was awarded the "World Prize" for the best stamp.
- In 1994 she was one of the winners of the prestigious "Prémio Bordalo".
- On 13 October 1998, she made a Grand Officer of the Order of Prince Henry.
- In 2001, the Portuguese art critic José-Augusto França selected her painting Portel (1986) as one of the "100 Portuguese Paintings of the 20th Century".
- In 2007, a street in Lisbon was named after her.
- In 2009, a book, compiled by Carlos Ribeiro and others, was published to mark the tenth anniversary of her death, bringing together almost all of her vast work. In the same year, the Portuguese Parliament in Lisbon, held a retrospective exhibition.

== Death ==
Maluda died in Lisbon on 10 February 1999, a victim of pancreatic cancer. She was buried in the Prazeres Cemetery in the area reserved for artists.
