= March 13 =

March 13 this year in various calendars
- Friday, 13 March 2026
| Akan | Nwonafie |
| Armenian | 26 Areg 1475 |
| Aztec | Huei Tecuilhuitl 2, 11 Itzcuintli |
| Babylonian | 23 Shabatu, 2336 SE |
| Balinese pawukon | Menga, Beteng, Laba, Wage, Aryang, Sukra of Wayang, Indra, Ogan, Pandita |
| Bengali | 28 Falgun, BS 1432 |
| Chinese | Yang Fire Dog・Ox Mansion; Fire Horse Year, Month 1, Day 25 (Jingzhe, 7 days until Chunfen) |
| Common Era | 13 March 2026 CE |
| Coptic | 4 Paremhat, AM 1742 |
| Egyptian | 1 Mesori, 2774 NE |
| Ethiopian | 4 Magābit, 2018 Amätä Məhrät |
| French Republican | Décade III, Tridi de Ventôse de l'Année 234 de la République |
| Gregorian | 13 March, AD 2026 |
| Hebrew | 24 Adar, AM 5786 |
| Hindu | Pūrvāṣāḍha・Vyatīpāta; Solar: 29 Phālguna, 1947 SE; Lunisolar: Daśamī, Kṛishna pakṣa of Phālguna, 2082 VE; Rāudra・5126 KY・1,872,647 |
| Icelandic | Föstudagur, 20 Góa 2025 |
| Islamic | 24 Ramadan, AH 1447 (using tabular method) |
| ISO week date | 2026-W11-5 |
| Japanese | 25 Mutsuki, Reiwa 8 (Keichitsu, 7 days until Shunbun) |
| Julian | 28 February, AD 2026 (AM 7534) |
| Julian day | 2461113 |
| Korean | 25 Horangidal, 4359 DE |
| Maya | 13.0.13.7.10; 8 Cumku, 11 Oc |
| Roman | Pridie Kalendas Martias, MMDCCLXXIX AUC |
| Solar Hijri | 22 Esfand, SH 1404 |
| Tibetan | 25 mchu, me pho rta 2153 or 1772 or 1000 |

| << | March | | | | | >> |
| Su | Mo | Tu | We | Th | Fr | Sa |
| 1 | 2 | 3 | 4 | 5 | 6 | 7 |
| 8 | 9 | 10 | 11 | 12 | 13 | 14 |
| 15 | 16 | 17 | 18 | 19 | 20 | 21 |
| 22 | 23 | 24 | 25 | 26 | 27 | 28 |
| 29 | 30 | 31 |
2026

March 13 in recent years
2026 (Friday)
2025 (Thursday)
2024 (Wednesday)
2023 (Monday)
2022 (Sunday)
2021 (Saturday)
2020 (Friday)
2019 (Wednesday)
2018 (Tuesday)
2017 (Monday)

March 13 is the 72nd day of the year (73rd in leap years) in the Gregorian calendar; 293 days remain until the end of the year.

== Events ==
=== Pre-1600 ===
- 222 – Roman emperor Elagabalus is murdered alongside his mother, Julia Soaemias. He is replaced by his 14-year old cousin, Severus Alexander.
- 483 – Election of Pope Felix III following the death of Pope Simplicius earlier that month.
- 624 – The Battle of Badr, the first major battle between the Muslims and Quraysh.
- 1261 – The Byzantine Empire and the Republic of Genoa sign a permanent treaty against the Venetians at Nymphaeum.
- 1323 – Siege of Warangal: Sultan Ghiyath al-Din Tughluq sends an expeditionary army led by his son, Muhammad bin Tughluq, to the Kakatiya capital Warangal – after ruler Prataparudra has refused to make tribute payments. He besieges the city and finally, after a campaign of 8 months, Prataparudra surrenders on November 9.
- 1567 – The Battle of Oosterweel, traditionally regarded as the start of the Eighty Years' War.
- 1591 – At the Battle of Tondibi in Mali, Moroccan forces of the Saadi dynasty, led by Judar Pasha, defeat the Songhai Empire, despite being outnumbered by at least five to one.

=== 1601–1900 ===
- 1639 – Harvard College is named after clergyman John Harvard.
- 1697 – Nojpetén, capital of the last independent Maya kingdom, falls to Spanish conquistadors, the final step in the Spanish conquest of Guatemala.
- 1741 – The Battle of Cartagena de Indias (part of the War of Jenkins' Ear) begins.
- 1781 – William Herschel discovers Uranus.
- 1809 – Gustav IV Adolf of Sweden is deposed in the Coup of 1809.
- 1811 – A French and Italian fleet is defeated by a British squadron off the island of Vis in the Adriatic during the Napoleonic Wars.
- 1815 – Participants at the Congress of Vienna declare Napoleon an outlaw following his escape from Elba.
- 1825 – Pope Leo XII publishes the apostolic constitution Quo Graviora in which he renewed the prohibition on Catholics joining freemasonry.
- 1845 – Felix Mendelssohn's Violin Concerto receives its première performance in Leipzig with Ferdinand David as soloist.
- 1848 – The German revolutions of 1848–1849 begin in Vienna.
- 1862 – The Act Prohibiting the Return of Slaves is passed by the United States Congress, effectively annulling the Fugitive Slave Act of 1850 and setting the stage for the Emancipation Proclamation.
- 1884 – The Siege of Khartoum begins. It lasts until January 26, 1885.
- 1888 – The eruption of Ritter Island triggers tsunamis that kill up to 3,000 people on nearby islands.
- 1900 – British forces occupy Bloemfontein, Orange Free State, during the Second Boer War.

=== 1901–present ===
- 1920 – The Kapp Putsch briefly ousts the Weimar Republic government from Berlin.
- 1930 – The news of the discovery of Pluto is announced by Lowell Observatory.
- 1940 – The Winter War between Finland and the Soviet Union officially ends after the signing of the Moscow Peace Treaty.
- 1943 – The Holocaust: German forces liquidate the Jewish ghetto in Kraków.
- 1954 – The Battle of Điện Biên Phủ begins with an artillery barrage by Viet Minh forces under Võ Nguyên Giáp; Viet Minh victory led to the end of the First Indochina War and French withdrawal from Vietnam.
- 1957 – Cuban student revolutionaries storm the presidential palace in Havana in a failed attempt on the life of President Fulgencio Batista.
- 1964 – Kitty Genovese is murdered in New York City, prompting research into the bystander effect due to the false story that neighbors witnessed the killing and did nothing to help her.
- 1969 – Apollo 9 returns safely to Earth after testing the Lunar Module.
- 1974 – Sierra Pacific Airlines Flight 802 crashes into the White Mountains near Bishop, California, killing 36.
- 1979 – The New Jewel Movement, headed by Maurice Bishop, ousts the Prime Minister of Grenada, Eric Gairy, in a coup d'état.
- 1988 – The Seikan Tunnel, the longest tunnel in the world with an undersea segment, opens between Aomori and Hakodate, Japan.
- 1989 – Space Shuttle Discovery launches on STS-29 carrying the TDRS-4 satellite.
- 1992 – The M_{w} 6.6 Erzincan earthquake strikes eastern Turkey with a maximum Mercalli intensity of VIII (Severe).
- 1993 – The 1993 Storm of the Century affects the eastern United States, dropping feet of snow in many areas.
- 1996 – The Dunblane massacre leads to the death of sixteen primary school children and one teacher in Dunblane, Scotland.
- 1997 – The Missionaries of Charity choose Sister Nirmala to succeed Mother Teresa as their leader.
- 2003 – An article in Nature identifies the Ciampate del Diavolo as 350,000-year-old hominid footprints.
- 2012 – The Sierre coach crash kills 28 people, including 22 children.
- 2013 – The 2013 papal conclave elects Cardinal Jorge Mario Bergoglio taking the name Pope Francis as the 266th Pope of the Catholic Church.
- 2015 - Serbian Army Mi-17 helicopter crashes near Belgrade airport while transporting a 5-day-old baby with respiratory problems to hospital, killing all 7 on board.
- 2016 – The Ankara bombing kills at least 37 people.
- 2016 – Three gunmen attack two hotels in the Ivory Coast town of Grand-Bassam, killing at least 19 people.
- 2019 – The Suzano school shooting kills 10 people.
- 2020 – President Donald Trump declares the COVID-19 pandemic to be a national emergency in the United States.
- 2020 – Breonna Taylor is killed by police officers who were forcibly entering her home in Louisville, Kentucky; her death sparked extensive protests against racism and police brutality.
- 2020 – Katerina Sakellaropoulou is sworn in as the first female President of Greece amid strict COVID-19 measures.

== Births ==
=== Pre-1600 ===
- 1372 – Louis I, Duke of Orléans (died 1407)
- 1479 – Lazarus Spengler, German hymnwriter (died 1534)
- 1560 – William Louis, Count of Nassau-Dillenburg, Dutch count (died 1620)
- 1593 – Georges de La Tour, French painter (probable; (died 1652)
- 1599 – John Berchmans, Belgian Jesuit scholastic and saint (died 1621)

=== 1601–1900 ===
- 1615 – Innocent XII, pope of the Catholic Church (died 1700)
- 1683 – Johann Wilhelm Weinmann, German botanist (died 1741)
- 1700 – Michel Blavet, French flute player and composer (died 1768)
- 1719 – John Griffin, 4th Baron Howard de Walden, English field marshal and politician, Lord Lieutenant of Essex (died 1797)
- 1720 – Charles Bonnet, Swiss historian and author (died 1793)
- 1741 – Joseph II, Holy Roman Emperor (died 1790)
- 1763 – Guillaume Brune, French general and diplomat (died 1815)
- 1764 – Charles Grey, 2nd Earl Grey, English politician, Prime Minister of the United Kingdom (died 1845)
- 1770 – Daniel Lambert, English animal breeder (died 1809)
- 1781 – Karl Friedrich Schinkel, German painter and architect, designed the Konzerthaus Berlin (died 1841)
- 1798 – Abigail Fillmore, American wife of Millard Fillmore, 14th First Lady of the United States (died 1853)
- 1800 – Mustafa Reşid Pasha, Ottoman politician, 212th Grand Vizier of the Ottoman Empire (died 1858)
- 1815 – James Curtis Hepburn, American physician, linguist, and missionary (died 1911)
- 1825 – Hans Gude, Norwegian-German painter and academic (died 1903)
- 1855 – Percival Lowell, American astronomer and mathematician (died 1916)
- 1857 – B. H. Roberts, English-American historian and politician (died 1933)
- 1860 – Hugo Wolf, Slovene-Austrian composer (died 1903)
- 1862 – Paul Prosper Henrys, French general (died 1943)
- 1864 – Alexej von Jawlensky, Russian-German painter (died 1941)
- 1870 – William Glackens, American painter and illustrator (died 1938)
- 1874 – Ellery Harding Clark, American jumper, coach, and lawyer (died 1949)
- 1880 – Josef Gočár, Czech architect (died 1945)
- 1883 – Enrico Toselli, Italian pianist and composer (died 1926)
- 1884 – Hugh Walpole, New Zealand-English author and educator (died 1941)
- 1886 – Home Run Baker, American baseball player and manager (died 1963)
- 1886 – Albert William Stevens, American captain and photographer (died 1949)
- 1888 – Paul Morand, French author and diplomat (died 1976)
- 1890 – Fritz Busch, German conductor and director (died 1951)
- 1892 – Janet Flanner, American journalist and author (died 1978)
- 1897 – Yeghishe Charents, Armenian poet and activist (died 1937)
- 1898 – Henry Hathaway, American director and producer (died 1985)
- 1899 – John Hasbrouck Van Vleck, American physicist and mathematician, Nobel Prize laureate (died 1980)
- 1899 – Pancho Vladigerov, Bulgarian pianist and composer (died 1978)
- 1900 – Andrée Bosquet, Belgian painter (died 1980)
- 1900 – Giorgos Seferis, Greek poet and diplomat, Nobel Prize laureate (died 1971)

=== 1901–present ===
- 1902 – Hans Bellmer, German-French painter and sculptor (died 1975)
- 1904 – Clifford Roach, Trinidadian cricketer and footballer (died 1988)
- 1907 – Dorothy Tangney, Australian politician (died 1985)
- 1908 – Walter Annenberg, American publisher, philanthropist, and diplomat, United States Ambassador to the United Kingdom (died 2002)
- 1908 – Myrtle Bachelder, American chemist and Women's Army Corps officer (died 1997)
- 1910 – Sammy Kaye, American saxophonist, songwriter, and bandleader (died 1987)
- 1910 – Kemal Tahir, Turkish journalist and author (died 1973)
- 1911 – José Ardévol, Cuban composer and conductor (died 1981)
- 1911 – L. Ron Hubbard, American author, founder of Scientology (died 1986)
- 1913 – William J. Casey, American politician, 13th Director of Central Intelligence (died 1987)
- 1913 – Sergey Mikhalkov, Russian author and playwright (died 2009)
- 1914 – W. O. Mitchell, Canadian author and playwright (died 1998)
- 1914 – Edward O'Hare, American lieutenant and pilot, Medal of Honor recipient (died 1943)
- 1916 – Lindy Boggs, American educator and politician, 5th United States Ambassador to the Holy See (died 2013)
- 1916 – Jacque Fresco, American engineer and academic (died 2017)
- 1920 – Ralph J. Roberts, American businessman, co-founded Comcast (died 2015)
- 1921 – Al Jaffee, American cartoonist (died 2023)
- 1923 – Dimitrios Ioannidis, Greek general (died 2010)
- 1925 – Roy Haynes, American drummer and composer (died 2024)
- 1926 – Carlos Roberto Reina, Honduran lawyer and politician, President of Honduras (died 2003)
- 1929 – Zbigniew Messner, Polish economist and politician, 9th Prime Minister of the Republic of Poland (died 2014)
- 1930 – Walter Jacob, American Reform rabbi (died 2024)
- 1933 – Diane Dillon, American illustrator
- 1933 – Mahdi Elmandjra, Moroccan economist and sociologist (died 2014)
- 1933 – Gero von Wilpert, German author and academic (died 2009)
- 1935 – David Nobbs, English author and screenwriter (died 2015)
- 1938 – Robert Gammage, American captain and politician (died 2012)
- 1939 – Neil Sedaka, American singer-songwriter and pianist (died 2026)
- 1941 – Donella Meadows, American environmentalist, author, and academic (died 2001)
- 1941 – Lee Moses, American R&B Soul Singer and Guitarist (died 1998)
- 1942 – Dave Cutler, American computer scientist and engineer
- 1942 – Mahmoud Darwish, Palestinian poet and author (died 2008)
- 1942 – Scatman John, American singer-songwriter (died 1999)
- 1942 – George Negus, Australian journalist and television host (died 2024)
- 1944 – Terence Burns, Baron Burns, English economist and academic
- 1945 – Anatoly Fomenko, Russian mathematician and academic
- 1946 – Yonatan Netanyahu, American-Israeli colonel (died 1976)
- 1947 – Lesley Collier, English ballerina and educator
- 1947 – Beat Richner, Swiss pediatrician and cellist (died 2018)
- 1947 – Lyn St. James, American race car driver
- 1949 – Ze'ev Bielski, Israeli politician
- 1949 – Sian Elias, New Zealand lawyer and politician, 12th Chief Justice of New Zealand
- 1949 – Trevor Sorbie, Scottish hairdresser (died 2024)
- 1950 – Joe Bugner, Hungarian-British boxer and actor (died 2025)
- 1950 – Bernard Julien, Trinidadian cricketer
- 1950 – Charles Krauthammer, American physician, journalist, and author (died 2018)
- 1950 – William H. Macy, American actor, director, and screenwriter
- 1952 – Wolfgang Rihm, German composer and educator
- 1952 – Tim Sebastian, English journalist and author
- 1953 – Andy Bean, American golfer (died 2023)
- 1953 – Michael Curry, American bishop, 27th Presiding Bishop of the Episcopal Church
- 1953 – Deborah Raffin, American actress (died 2012)
- 1954 – Valerie Amos, Baroness Amos, Guyanese-English politician and diplomat
- 1954 – Robin Duke, Canadian actress and screenwriter
- 1955 – Bruno Conti, Italian footballer and manager
- 1955 – Glenne Headly, American actress (died 2017)
- 1955 – Olga Rukavishnikova, Russian pentathlete
- 1956 – Dana Delany, American actress and producer
- 1956 – Jamie Dimon, North-American businessman and banker
- 1957 – John Hoeven, American banker and politician, 31st Governor of North Dakota
- 1957 – Moses Hogan, American composer and conductor (died 2003)
- 1958 – Mágico González, Salvadoran footballer
- 1958 – Rick Lazio, American lawyer and politician
- 1958 – Caryl Phillips, Caribbean-English author and playwright
- 1959 – Dirk Wellham, Australian cricketer
- 1960 – Adam Clayton, English-Irish musician and songwriter
- 1960 – Joe Ranft, American animator, screenwriter, and voice actor (died 2005)
- 1962 – Alfredo Maia, Portuguese politician
- 1963 – Mariano Duncan, Dominican baseball player and manager
- 1963 – Vance Johnson, American football player
- 1963 – Fito Páez, Argentine musician, songwriter and filmmaker
- 1964 – Will Clark, American baseball player
- 1964 – Craig Dimond, Australian rugby league player
- 1964 – Trevor Gillmeister, Australian rugby league player and coach
- 1966 – Chico Science, Brazilian singer-songwriter (died 1997)
- 1967 – Andrés Escobar, Colombian footballer (died 1994)
- 1967 – Pieter Vink, Dutch footballer and referee
- 1969 – Darren Fritz, Australian rugby league player
- 1970 – Tim Story, American director and producer
- 1971 – Annabeth Gish, American actress
- 1971 – Allan Nielsen, Danish footballer and manager
- 1971 – Adina Porter, American actress
- 1972 – Common, American rapper and actor
- 1972 – Trent Dilfer, American football player, coach, and analyst
- 1973 – Edgar Davids, Surinamese-Dutch footballer and manager
- 1973 – David Draiman, American singer-songwriter
- 1973 – Bobby Jackson, American basketball player and coach
- 1974 – James Brinkley, Scottish cricketer
- 1974 – Thomas Enqvist, Swedish tennis player and sportscaster
- 1975 – Mark Clattenburg, English football referee
- 1976 – Troy Hudson, American basketball player and rapper
- 1976 – Danny Masterson, American actor and producer
- 1978 – Tom Danielson, American cyclist
- 1979 – Johan Santana, Venezuelan baseball player
- 1979 – Cédric Van Branteghem, Belgian sprinter
- 1980 – Caron Butler, American basketball player
- 1980 – Brad Watts, Australian rugby league player
- 1982 – Izi Castro Marques, Brazilian basketball player
- 1982 – Nicole Ohlde, American basketball player
- 1983 – Kaitlin Sandeno, American swimmer
- 1984 – Geeta Basra, Indian actress
- 1985 – Alcides, Brazilian footballer
- 1985 – Emile Hirsch, American actor
- 1985 – Aleksandra Kosiorek, Polish politician and jurist
- 1986 – Neil Wagner, South African-New Zealand cricketer
- 1987 – Marco Andretti, American race car driver
- 1987 – Andreas Beck, German footballer
- 1988 – Furdjel Narsingh, Dutch footballer
- 1989 – Holger Badstuber, German footballer
- 1989 – Peaches Geldof, English columnist, television personality, and model (died 2014)
- 1989 – Sandy León, Venezuelan baseball player
- 1989 – Marko Marin, German footballer
- 1989 – Robert Wickens, Canadian racing driver
- 1990 – Anicet Abel, Malagasy footballer
- 1990 – Marcell Dareus, American football player
- 1991 – Daniel Greig, Australian speed skater
- 1991 – Tristan Thompson, American basketball player
- 1992 – Lucy Fry, Australian actress
- 1992 – George MacKay, English actor
- 1992 – Ozuna, Puerto Rican singer-songwriter and rapper
- 1992 – L, South Korean actor and singer
- 1993 – Tyrone Mings, English footballer
- 1994 – Gerard Deulofeu, Spanish footballer
- 1994 – Mohammed Siraj, Indian cricketer
- 1995 – Mikaela Shiffrin, American skier
- 1995 – Jang Su-jeong, South Korean tennis player
- 1996 – Brayden Point, Canadian ice hockey player
- 1997 – Pyper America, American model, actress, and musician
- 1997 – Landry Shamet, American basketball player
- 1998 – Jay-Roy Grot, Dutch footballer
- 1998 – Jack Harlow, American rapper, singer-songwriter, and actor
- 2001 – Beomgyu, South Korean singer-songwriter
- 2001 – Thomas Dearden, Australian rugby league player
- 2002 – Frank Gore Jr., American football player
- 2004 – Coco Gauff, American tennis player

== Deaths ==
=== Pre-1600 ===
- 1202 – Mieszko III the Old, king of Poland (born c. 1121)
- 1271 – Henry of Almain, English knight (born 1235)
- 1415 – Minye Kyawswa, Crown Prince of Ava (born 1391)
- 1447 – Shah Rukh, Timurid ruler of Persia and Transoxania (born 1377)
- 1573 – Michel de l'Hôpital, French politician (born 1507)

=== 1601–1900 ===
- 1601 – Henry Cuffe, Politician (born 1563)
- 1619 – Richard Burbage, English actor (born 1567)
- 1711 – Nicolas Boileau-Despréaux, French poet and critic (born 1636)
- 1719 – Johann Friedrich Böttger, German chemist and potter (born 1682)
- 1800 – Nana Fadnavis, Indian minister and politician (born 1742)
- 1808 – Christian VII of Denmark (born 1749)
- 1823 – John Jervis, 1st Earl of St Vincent, English admiral and politician (born 1735)
- 1833 – William Bradley, English lieutenant and cartographer (born 1757)
- 1842 – Henry Shrapnel, English general (born 1761)
- 1854 – Jean-Baptiste de Villèle, French politician, 6th Prime Minister of France (born 1773)
- 1873 – David Swinson Maynard, American physician, lawyer, and businessman (born 1808)
- 1879 – Adolf Anderssen, German mathematician and chess player (born 1818)
- 1881 – Alexander II of Russia (born 1818)
- 1884 – Leland Stanford Jr., American son of Leland Stanford (born 1868)
- 1885 – Giorgio Mitrovich, Maltese politician (born 1795)

=== 1901–present ===
- 1901 – Benjamin Harrison, American general and politician, 23rd President of the United States (born 1833)
- 1906 – Susan B. Anthony, American activist (born 1820)
- 1912 – Eugène-Étienne Taché, Canadian engineer and architect, designed the Parliament Building (born 1836)
- 1921 – Jenny Twitchell Kempton, American opera singer and educator (born 1835)
- 1923 – Josephine Leary, American real estate entrepreneur (born 1856)
- 1936 – Francis Bell, New Zealand lawyer and politician, 20th Prime Minister of New Zealand (born 1851)
- 1938 – Clarence Darrow, American lawyer and author (born 1857)
- 1943 – Stephen Vincent Benét, American poet, short story writer, and novelist (born 1898)
- 1946 – Werner von Blomberg, German field marshal (born 1878)
- 1951 – Ants "the Terrible" Kaljurand, Estonian anti-communist, freedom fighter and forest brother (born 1917)
- 1953 – Johan Laidoner, Estonian general and statesman (born 1884)
- 1961 – Lise Lindbæk, Norwegian journalist and war correspondent (born 1905)
- 1962 – Anne Acheson, Irish sculptor (born 1882)
- 1965 – Vittorio Jano, Italian engineer (born 1891)
- 1965 – Fan Noli, Albanian-American bishop and politician, 14th Prime Minister of Albania (born 1882)
- 1971 – Rockwell Kent, American painter and illustrator (born 1882)
- 1972 – Tony Ray-Jones, English photographer (born 1941)
- 1975 – Ivo Andrić, Yugoslav novelist, poet, and short story writer, Nobel Prize laureate (born 1892)
- 1976 – Ole Haugsrud, American sports executive (born 1900)
- 1983 – Paul Citroen, German-Dutch illustrator and educator (born 1896)
- 1990 – Bruno Bettelheim, Austrian-American psychologist and author (born 1903)
- 1995 – Odette Hallowes, French nurse and spy (born 1912)
- 1996 – Krzysztof Kieślowski, Polish director and screenwriter (born 1941)
- 1998 – Judge Dread, English singer-songwriter (born 1945)
- 1998 – Hans von Ohain, German-American physicist and engineer (born 1911)
- 1999 – Lee Falk, American cartoonist, director, and producer (born 1911)
- 1999 – Garson Kanin, American director and screenwriter (born 1912)
- 2001 – John A. Alonzo, American actor and cinematographer (born 1934)
- 2001 – Encarnacion Alzona, Filipino historian and educator (born 1895)
- 2002 – Hans-Georg Gadamer, German philosopher and scholar (born 1900)
- 2004 – Franz König, Austrian cardinal (born 1905)
- 2006 – Robert C. Baker, American businessman, invented the chicken nugget (born 1921)
- 2006 – Jimmy Johnstone, Scottish footballer (born 1944)
- 2006 – Maureen Stapleton, American actress (born 1925)
- 2006 – Peter Tomarken, American television personality, game show host (born 1942)
- 2007 – Arnold Skaaland, American wrestler and manager (born 1925)
- 2009 – Betsy Blair, American actress (born 1923)
- 2009 – Alan W. Livingston, American businessman (born 1917)
- 2010 – Jean Ferrat, French singer-songwriter (born 1930)
- 2011 – Rick Martin, Canadian-American ice hockey player (born 1951)
- 2013 – Clive Burr, English drummer and songwriter (born 1957)
- 2014 – Reubin Askew, American sergeant, lawyer, and politician, 37th Governor of Florida (born 1928)
- 2014 – Edward Haughey, Baron Ballyedmond, Irish businessman and politician (born 1944)
- 2014 – Ahmad Tejan Kabbah, Sierra Leonean economist, lawyer, and politician, 3rd President of Sierra Leone (born 1932)
- 2014 – Icchokas Meras, Lithuanian-Israeli author and screenwriter (born 1934)
- 2015 – Al Rosen, American baseball player and manager (born 1924)
- 2016 – Hilary Putnam, American philosopher, mathematician, and computer scientist (born 1926)
- 2017 – Amy Krouse Rosenthal, American author (born 1965)
- 2018 – Emily Nasrallah, Lebanese writer and women's rights activist. (born 1931)
- 2021 – Marvelous Marvin Hagler, American professional boxer (born 1954)
- 2021 – Murray Walker, English motorsport commentator and journalist (born 1923)
- 2022 – William Hurt, American actor (born 1950)
- 2024 – Philippe de Gaulle, French admiral (born 1921)
- 2025 – John Feinstein, American sportswriter and commentator (born 1956)
- 2025 – Raúl Grijalva, United States representative from Arizona (born 1948)
- 2025 – Sofia Gubaidulina, Russian-German pianist and composer (born 1931)

== Holidays and observances ==
- Christian feast days:
  - Ansovinus
  - Christina of Persia
  - Gerald of Mayo
  - James Theodore Holly (Episcopal Church (USA))
  - Nicephorus
  - Roderick
  - March 13 (Eastern Orthodox liturgics)
- Kasuga Matsuri (Kasuga Grand Shrine, Nara, Japan)
- National Elephant Day (Thailand)
- Africa Scout Day
