= List of saints named Leo =

St. Leo may refer to one of several saints named Leo, including:

- Leo of Patara (died c. 260), early Christian martyr
- Leo of Montefeltro (died 366), bishop of Montefeltro
- Pope Leo I the Great (died 461), Pope of Rome
- Emperor Leo I the Great (died 474), Eastern Roman Emperor
- Leo of Cappadocia (died c. 580)
- Pope Leo II (died 683), Pope of Rome
- Leo of Catania (died c. 785), Wonderworker and bishop of Catania in Sicily
- Leo of Bayonne, France (died c. 890), feast day March 1

== Eastern Orthodox ==
- Leo of Optina (1768–1841), hieroschemamonk and elder of Optina Monastery
- Lev Egorov (1889–1937), archimandrite and hieromartyr

== Roman Catholic ==
- Pope Leo III (died 816), Pope of Rome
- Pope Leo IV (died 855), Pope of Rome
- Pope Leo IX (died 1054), Pope of Rome
