= February 28 (Eastern Orthodox liturgics) =

Day in the Eastern Orthodox liturgical calendar

Eastern Orthodox liturgical calendar
February 27	February 28	March 1 (or February 29 (Note: in a leap year))
February 28 O.S. ≍ March 13 (or March 12) N.S. February 28 N.S ≍ February 15 O.S.

An Eastern Orthodox cross

February 28 in Eastern Orthodox liturgical calendars is a feast day and a day of commemoration of saints and martyrs. Although some Orthodox churches use the Revised Julian Calendar and others use the traditional Julian calendar, the fixed commemorations for their respective February 28 are broadly the same, no matter which calendar is used. (Note: Despite the dates being the same, the days to which they refer typically differ by 13 days. The notation Old Style or O.S. is sometimes used to indicate a date in the traditional Julian Calendar (the "Old Calendar"). The notation New Style or N.S. indicates a date in the Revised Julian calendar (the "New Calendar").)

== Saints ==
- Apostles of the Seventy Nymphas and Eubulus (1st century)
- Hieromartyr Nestor of Magydos, Bishop of Magydos, at Perge in Pamphylia (c. 250)
- Martyrs Macarius, Rufinus, Justus and Theophilus, in Rome (250) (Note: Potters by trade, they were martyred under Decius, perhaps in Rome, and were venerated in Bari and Bologna in Italy.)
- Martyrs Caerellius, Publius, Gaius, and Serapion, in Alexandria.
- Holy 6 Martyrs in Alexandria, Egypt. (see also: October 19)
- Martyr Abercius, by the sword.
- Saints Marina and Kyra, and Domnica, nuns, of Beroea (Aleppo) in Syria (c. 450)
- Hieromartyr Proterius of Alexandria, Patriarch of Alexandria, and six companions (457)
- Venerable Basil the Confessor (747), companion of St. Procopius, at Decapolis.

Commemorated on February 29 / March 13 in leap years; otherwise here on February 28:
- Saint Germanus of Dacia Pontica (Dobrogea, Romania) (c. 415)
- Venerable John Cassian the Roman, Abbot of Monastery of St Victor, Marseille (435)
- Venerable John, called Barsanuphius (Barsus of Damascus), of Nitria in Egypt (5th century)
- Saint George the Confessor, Bishop of Defeltos (7th century) (Note: Saint George is not listed in the Synaxaristes. His memory is recorded in Lavreotic Codex E 152 pp. 367a. He is remembered as a Bishop of the Church of Christ in the period of the heretical Monotheletes in the 7th century, and he endured many trials by these Scythians (Greek: Σκύθες) for his commitment to the Orthodox Faith and piety.)
- Saint Leo of Cappadocia, monastic.
- Martyr Theocteristus, Abbot of Pelekete Monastery near Prusa (8th century) (see also: February 17 and November 10)

== Pre-Schism Western saints ==
- Saint Romanus of Condat, desert-dweller of Condat in the Jura Mountains, Gaul (460) (Note: A Gallo-Roman who at the age of thirty-five went to live as a hermit in the Jura mountains, where he was followed by his brother St Lupicinus. Many disciples soon gathered round the two brothers, who then founded the monasteries of Condat (later known as Saint-Oyend) and Leuconne, over which they ruled together, and the convent of La Beaume (later called St-Romain-de-la-Roche) where their sister was abbess.) (Note: "In the territory of Lyons, on Mount Jura, the demise of St. Romanus, abbot, who was the first to lead the eremitical life there. His reputation for virtues and miracles brought under his guidance numerous monks.")
- Saint Hilary (Hilarus), Pope of Rome (468) (Note: Born in Sardinia, he became Pope of Rome in 461 and worked energetically against Nestorianism and Eutychianism and also consolidated the Church.)
- Saint Llibio, the patron-saint of Llanlibio in Anglesey in Wales (6th century)
- Saint Maidoc (Madoc), Bishop, Llanmadog in Wales was named after him (6th century)
- Saint Ruellinus (Ruellin), successor of St Tudwal as Bishop of Tréguier in Brittany (6th century)
- Saint Sillan (Silvanus), a disciple of St Comgall in Bangor Abbey, Co. Down, Ireland, and his second successor as abbot there (c. 610)

Commemorated on February 29 / March 13 in leap years; otherwise here on February 28:
- Saint Oswald of Worcester, Archbishop of York (992) (Note: Born in England of a noble Danish family, he was the nephew of St Oda of Canterbury. He went to Fleury in France to learn from monastic life and later became Bishop of Worcester (961), identifying himself with St Dunstan and St Ethelwold in their efforts to revive monastic life in England. St Oswald founded monasteries at Ramsey and at Worcester. In 972 he became Archbishop of York. He repose on his knees after washing the feet of twelve poor people, as was his daily practice.)

== Post-Schism Orthodox saints ==
- Saint Yaroslav the Wise, thrice Grand Prince of Novgorod and Kiev (1054) (see also: February 19)
- Holy 40,000 Martyrs, under the Mamluk Turks, by burning (13th century)
- Blessed Nicholas of Pskov, Fool-for-Christ (1576)
- New Virgin-martyr Kyranna of Thessaloniki (1751)

Commemorated on February 29 / March 13 in leap years; otherwise here on February 28:
- Venerable Cassian, recluse and faster of the Kiev Caves (12th century)
- Saint Cassian of Mu Lake (Muezersk) Hermitage, disciple of St. Alexander of Svir (16th century)
- Saint Arsenius (Matseyevich), Metropolitan of Rostov, Confessor (1772) (Note: More than 200 miracles were reported to have occurred at his intercession.)
- Saint Meletius, Archbishop of Kharkiv and Akhtyr (1840) (see also: February 12)

=== New martyrs and confessors ===
- New Hieromartyr Sergius, Priest (1932)

== Other commemorations ==
- Commemoration of the Great Earthquake at Antioch (1092)

Commemorated on February 29 / March 13 in leap years; otherwise here on February 28:
- "Devpeteruv" Icon of the Mother of God (1392)

== Icon gallery ==
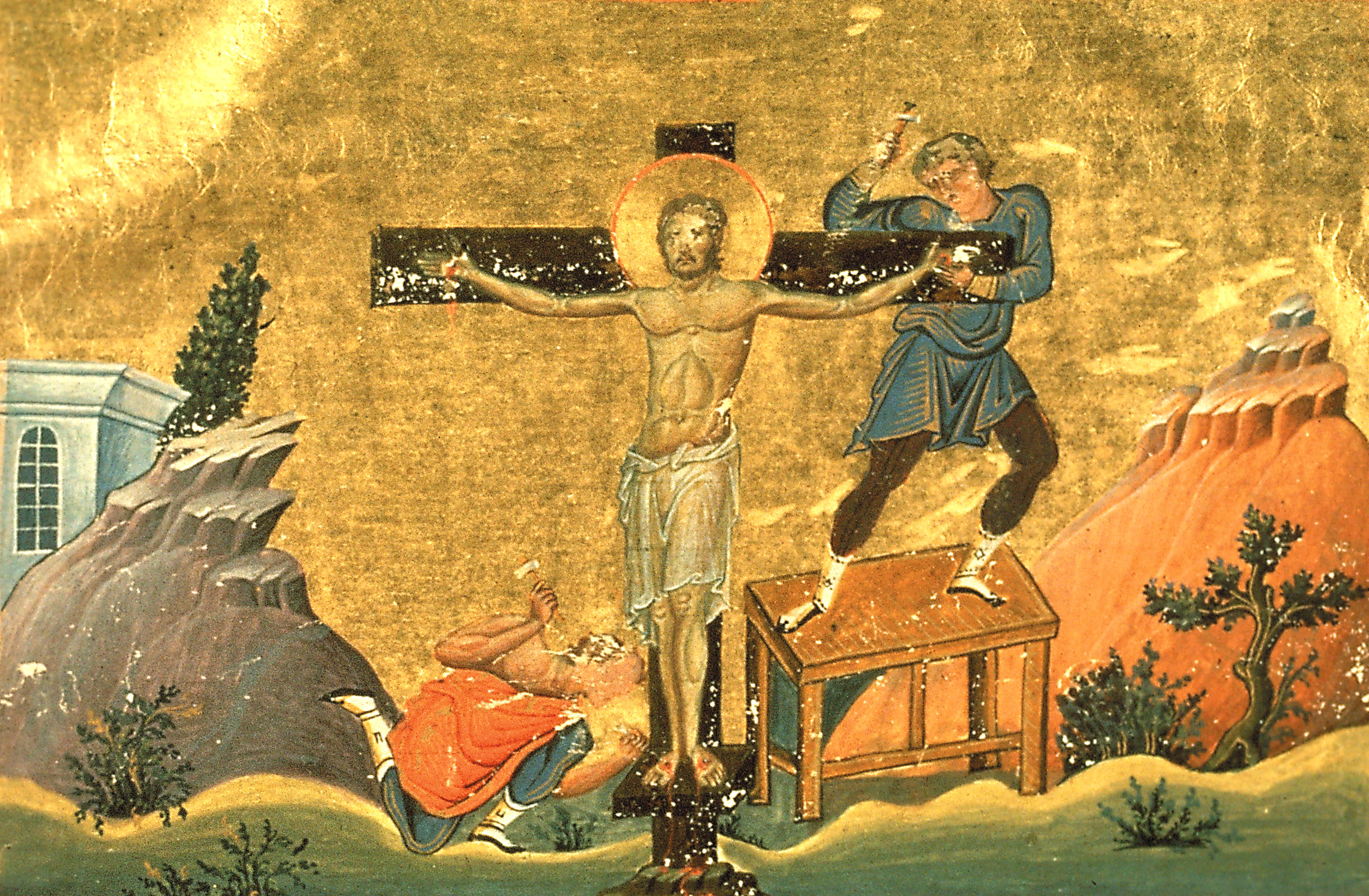
Hieromartyr Nestor of Magydos.

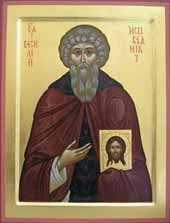
Venerable Basil the Confessor.

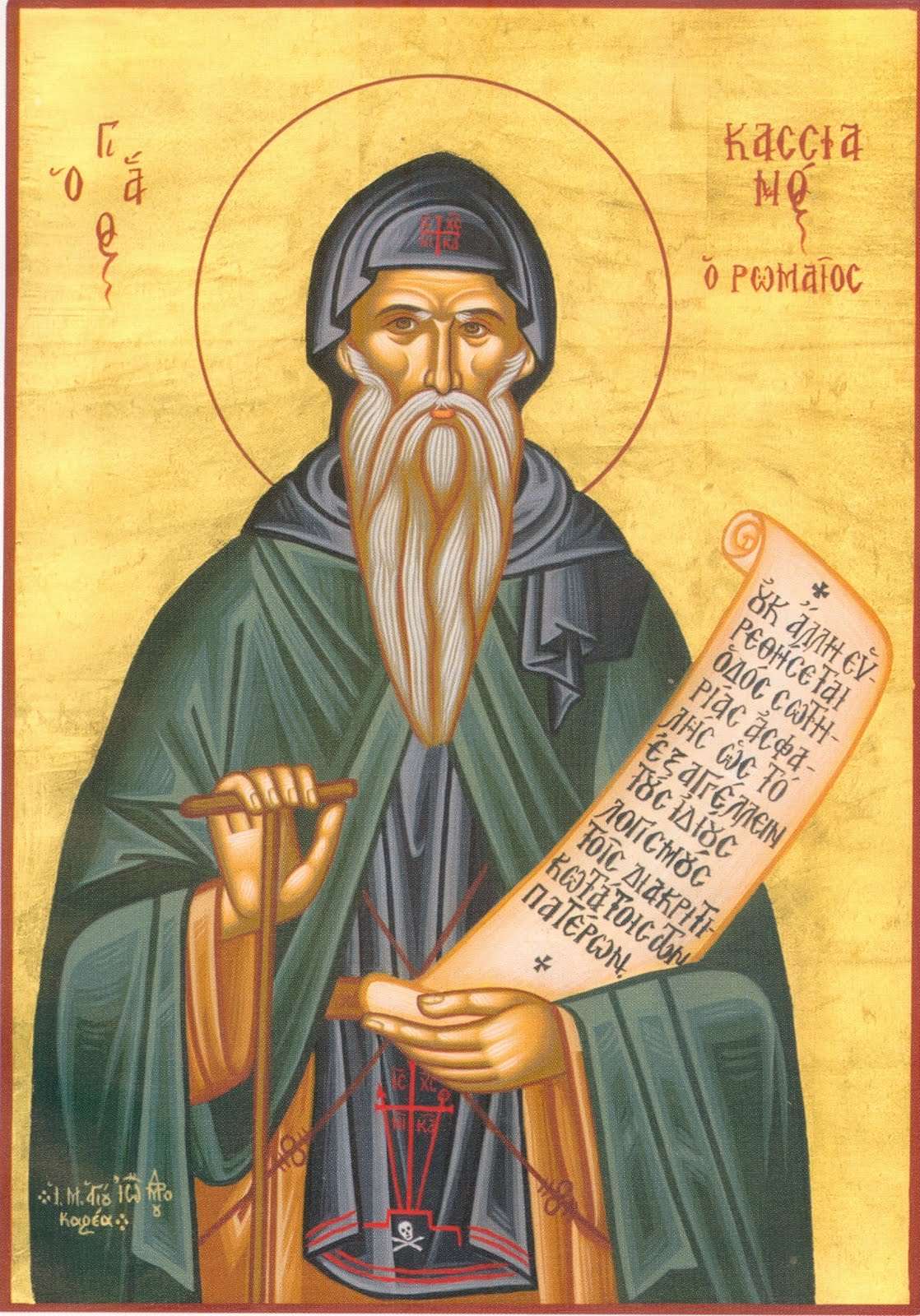
Venerable John Cassian.

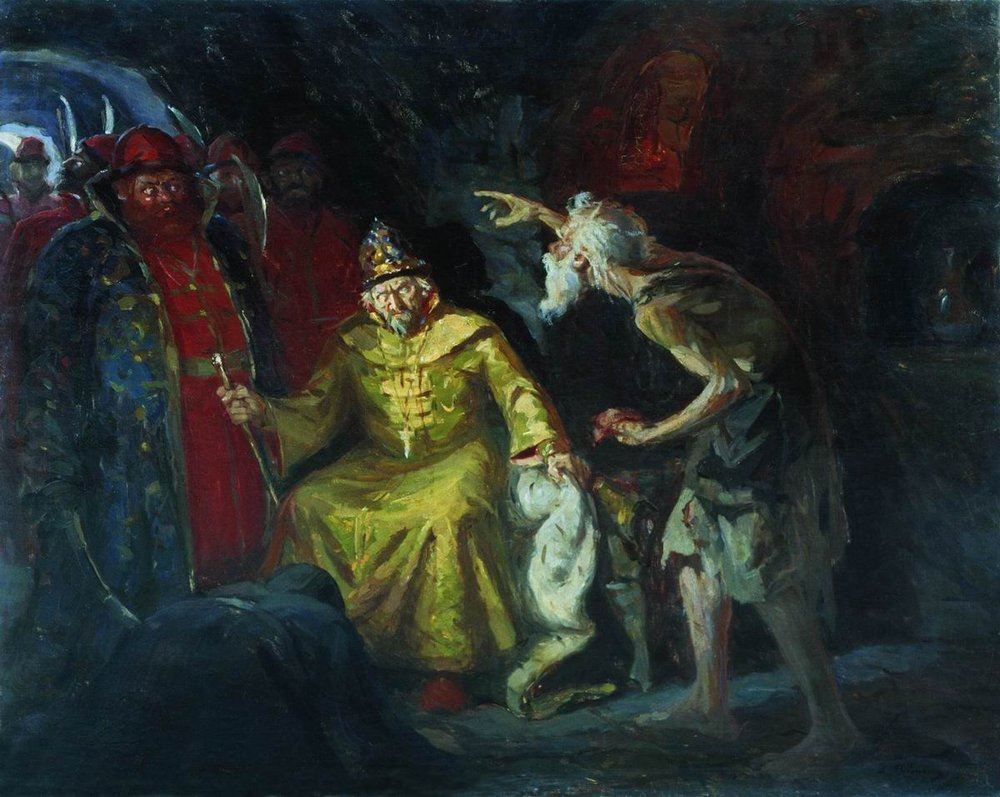
Blessed Nicholas of Pskov.

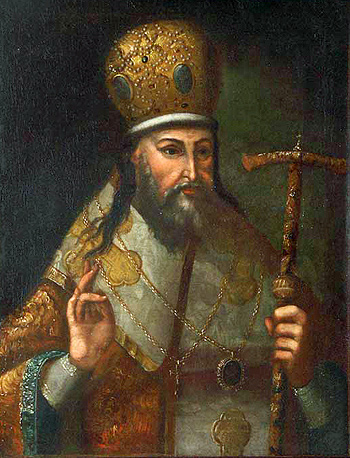
Saint Arsenius (Matseyevich).

== Sources ==
- February 28 / March 13. Orthodox Calendar (Pravoslavie.ru).
- March 13 / February 28. Holy Trinity Russian Orthodox Church (A parish of the Patriarchate of Moscow).
- February 28. OCA - The Lives of the Saints.
- The Autonomous Orthodox Metropolia of Western Europe and the Americas. St. Hilarion Calendar of Saints for the year of our Lord 2004. St. Hilarion Press (Austin, TX). p. 18.
- The Twenty-Eighth Day of the Month of February. Orthodoxy in China.
- February 28. Latin Saints of the Orthodox Patriarchate of Rome.
- The Roman Martyrology. Transl. by the Archbishop of Baltimore. Last Edition, According to the Copy Printed at Rome in 1914. Revised Edition, with the Imprimatur of His Eminence Cardinal Gibbons. Baltimore: John Murphy Company, 1916. p. 61.
- Rev. Richard Stanton. A Menology of England and Wales, or, Brief Memorials of the Ancient British and English Saints Arranged According to the Calendar, Together with the Martyrs of the 16th and 17th Centuries. London: Burns & Oates, 1892. pp. 88-91.

Greek Sources

- Great Synaxaristes: (in Greek) 28 Φεβρουαρίου. Μεγασ Συναξαριστησ.
- (in Greek) Συναξαριστής. 28 Φεβρουαρίου. Ecclesia.gr. (H Εκκλησια τησ Ελλαδοσ).

Russian Sources

- (in Russian) 13 марта (28 февраля). Православная Энциклопедия под редакцией Патриарха Московского и всея Руси Кирилла (электронная версия). (Orthodox Encyclopedia - Pravenc.ru).
- (in Russian) 28 февраля (ст.ст.) 13 марта 2014 (нов. ст.). Русская Православная Церковь Отдел внешних церковных связей.
