= February 29 (Eastern Orthodox liturgics) =

Day in the Eastern Orthodox liturgical calendar

Eastern Orthodox liturgical calendar
February 28	February 29	March 1
February 29 O.S. ≍ March 13 N.S. February 29 N.S ≍ February 16 O.S.

An Eastern Orthodox cross

February 29 in Eastern Orthodox liturgical calendars is a feast day and a day of commemoration of saints and martyrs. Although some Orthodox churches use the Revised Julian Calendar and others use the traditional Julian calendar, the fixed commemorations for their respective February 29 are broadly the same, no matter which calendar is used. (Note: Despite the dates being the same, the days to which they refer typically differ by 13 days. The notation Old Style or O.S. is sometimes used to indicate a date in the traditional Julian Calendar (the "Old Calendar"). The notation New Style or N.S. indicates a date in the Revised Julian calendar (the "New Calendar").)

== Saints ==
- Saint Leo of Cappadocia, monastic.
- Venerable John Cassian the Roman, Abbot of Monastery of St Victor, Marseille (435)
- Venerable Germanus of Dacia Pontica (Dobrogea, Romania) (c. 415)
- Venerable John, called Barsanuphius, of Nitria in Egypt (5th century) (Note: The Monk John, called Barsonophios, was a native of Palestine. At 18 years of age he accepted holy Baptism, and soon also monastic vows. Because of his ascetic life, the Monk John was ordained bishop of the city of Damascus. Once, in his love for the solitary life, the Monk John left off being bishop and secretly withdrew to Alexandria, calling himself Barsonophios. Then he went off into the Nitreian wilderness, arrived at a monastery and besought the hegumen to accept him into the monastery, so as to serve the elders. He conscientiously fulfilled this obedience by day, and nights he spent in prayer. After a certain while Saint Theodore of Nitreia saw the monk, and knew of him that he was a bishop. Saint John then again concealed himself and withdrew into Egypt, where he asceticised until the end of his days (V).)
- Saint George the Confessor, Bishop of Defeltos (7th century) (Note: Saint George is not listed in the Synaxaristes. His memory is recorded in Lavreotic Codex E 152 pp. 367a. He is remembered as a Bishop of the Church of Christ in the period of the heretical Monotheletes in the 7th century, and he endured many trials by these Scythians (Greek: Σκύθες) for his commitment to the Orthodox Faith and piety.)
- Martyr Theocteristus, Abbot of Pelekete Monastery near Prusa (8th century) (Note: The Holy Martyr Theoktyrist (Theostyriktos), Hegumen of the Pelikiote monastery, suffered for icon veneration under the impious emperor Constantine Copronymos (741-775). Together with him, subjected to tortures were Saint Stephen the New (Comm. 28 November) and other pious monks. Saint Theoktyrist was burnt with boiling tar. The holy martyr is known as a spiritual writer and the author of a canon to the Mother of God "Sustaint in Many Misfortunes".)

== Pre-Schism Western saints ==
- Saint Oswald of Worcester, Archbishop of York (992)

== Post-Schism Orthodox saints ==
- Venerable Cassian, recluse and faster of the Kiev Caves (12th century)
- Saint Cassian of Mu Lake (Muezersk) Hermitage, disciple of St. Alexander of Svir (16th century)
- Saint Arsenius (Matseyevich), Archbishop of Rostov (1772)
- Saint Meletius, Archbishop of Kharkiv and Akhtyr (1840) (see also: February 12)

== Other commemorations ==
- "Devpeteruv" Icon of the Mother of God (1392)

== Icon gallery ==
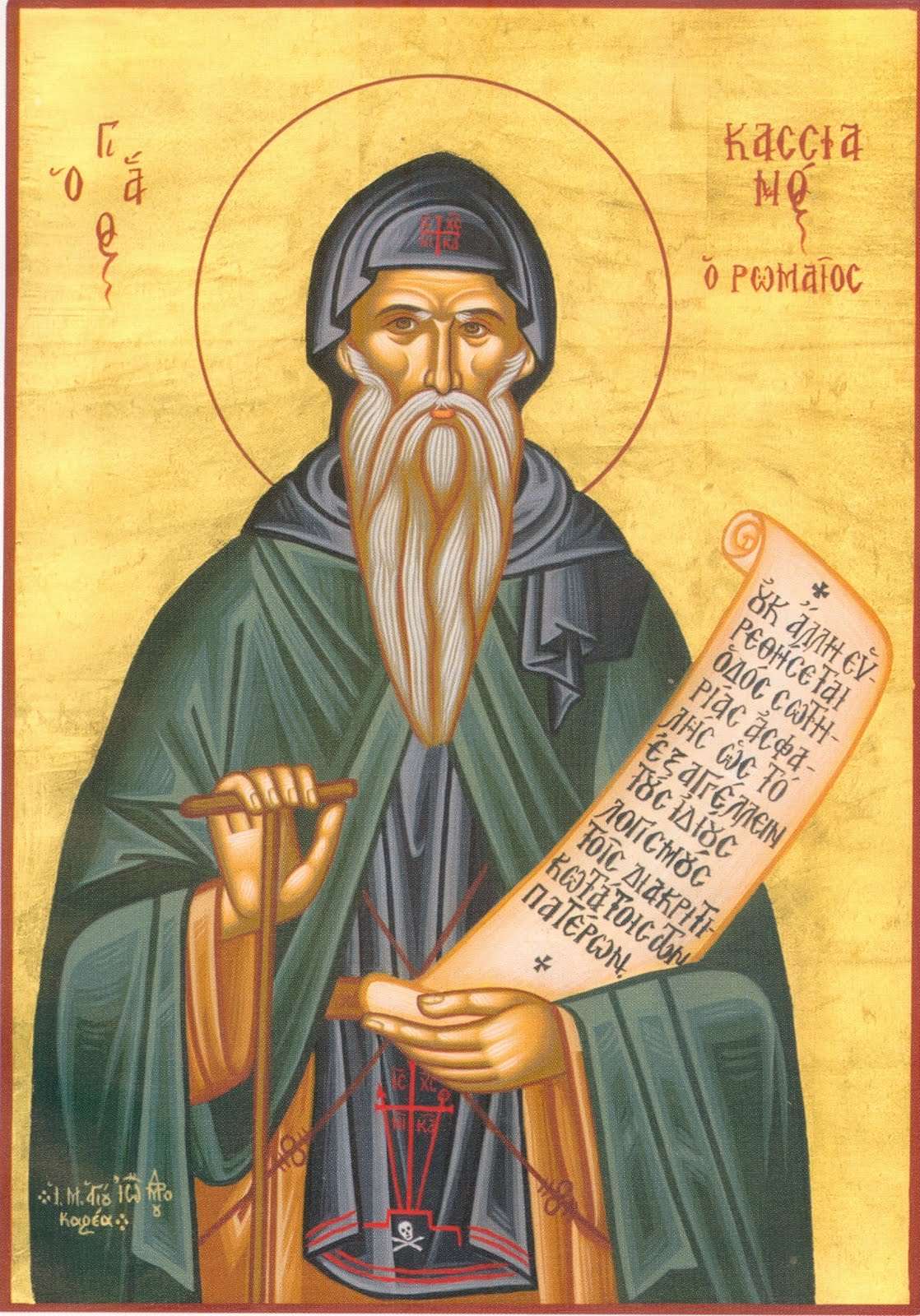
Venerable John Cassian.

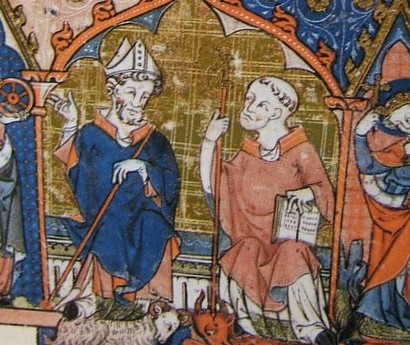
St. Oswald, Archbishop of York.

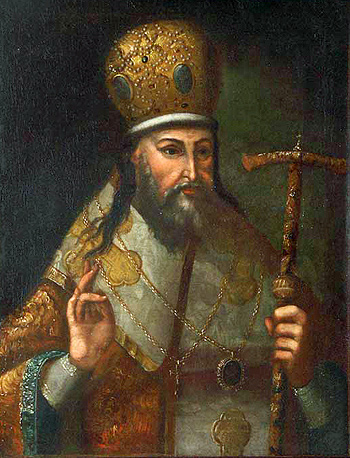
St. Arsenius (Matseyevich) of Rostov.

== Sources ==
- February 29 / March 13. Orthodox Calendar (Pravoslavie.ru).
- March 13 / February 29. Holy Trinity Russian Orthodox Church (A parish of the Patriarchate of Moscow).
- February 29. OCA - The Lives of the Saints.
- The Autonomous Orthodox Metropolia of Western Europe and the Americas. St. Hilarion Calendar of Saints for the year of our Lord 2004. St. Hilarion Press (Austin, TX). p. 18.
- The Twenty-Ninth Day of the Month of February. Orthodoxy in China.

Greek Sources

- (in Greek) Συναξαριστής. 29 Φεβρουαρίου. Ecclesia.gr. (H Εκκλησια Τησ Ελλαδοσ).

Russian Sources

- (in Russian) 16 февраля (ст.ст.) 29 февраля 2012 (нов. ст.). Русская Православная Церковь Отдел внешних церковных связей.
