= March 13 (Eastern Orthodox liturgics) =

Day in the Eastern Orthodox liturgical calendar

Eastern Orthodox liturgical calendar
March 12	March 13	March 14
March 13 O.S. ≍ March 26 N.S. March 13 N.S ≍ February 28 (or February 29 (Note: in a leap year)) O.S.

An Eastern Orthodox cross

March 13 in Eastern Orthodox liturgical calendars is a feast day and a day of commemoration of saints and martyrs. Although some Orthodox churches use the Revised Julian Calendar and others use the traditional Julian calendar, the fixed commemorations for their respective March 13 are broadly the same, no matter which calendar is used. (Note: Despite the dates being the same, the days to which they refer typically differ by 13 days. The notation Old Style or O.S. is sometimes used to indicate a date in the traditional Julian Calendar (the "Old Calendar"). The notation New Style or N.S. indicates a date in the Revised Julian calendar (the "New Calendar").)

== Saints ==
- Hieromartyr Publius, Bishop of Malta and later Bishop of Athens (2nd century) (Note: In the Eastern Orthodox Church his feast day is observed on March 13. According to an epistle of Saint Dionysius, Bishop of Corinth, Saint Publius lived in the 2nd century and came from the city of Athens. He became bishop there as the successor of Saint Narcissus of Athens, thus dating his martyrdom to the period of the persecution under Marcus Aurelius (161-180). However, in the West (Roman Catholic Church), his feast day is celebrated instead on January 21, and he is placed as the successor of St. Dionysius the Areopagite (Denis the Areopagite), dating his martyrdom to c. 112 AD: "At Athens, the birthday of St. Publius, bishop, who, as successor of St. Denis the Areopagite, nobly governed the Church of Athens. No less celebrated for the lustre of his virtues than for the brilliancy of his learning, he was gloriously crowned for having borne testimony to Christ.") (see also: January 21 - West)
- Martyrs Alexander, Dionysius and Frontonus, the "Basilikoi" (the Emperor's men), in Thessaloniki (c. 305) (see also: March 14)
- Martyr Christina of Persia, scourged to death (4th century)
- Venerable Euphrasia, in the Thebaid (Thebais). (see also: July 25)
- Martyr Abibus (Sabinus), at Hermopolis in Egypt, tied with stones and drowned in a river.
- Saint Marios (Marius), Bishop of Sebasteia.
- Venerable martyr Theoktistos, of the Great Lavra of St. Sabbas the Sanctified, reposed in peace (797)

== Pre-Schism Western saints ==
- Martyrs Africanus, Publius, and Terence, at Carthage (250) (Note: The Holy Martyrs Africanus, Publius and Terence suffered in the 3rd century at Petrium. Their memory is celebrated also on October 28, April 5 and April 10.)
- Saint Leander of Seville, Bishop of Seville (596)
- Martyr Ramirus and Companions, at the monastery of St Claudio in Leon in Spain (c. 554 or 630) (Note: A monk at the monastery of St Claudio in Leon in Spain. Two days after the abbot, St Vincent, was martyred, Ramirus and all the other monks were martyred by the Arian Visigoths while they sang the Creed.)
- Saint Mochoemoc (Mochaemhog, Pulcherius, Vulcanius), monk at Bangor in Co. Down under St Comgall, later founded Liath-Mochoemoc (c. 656) (Note: Born in Munster in Ireland, he was the nephew of St Ita. He became a monk at Bangor in Co. Down under St Comgall and later founded Liath-Mochoemoc.)
- Saint Kevoca (Kennotha, Quivoca), a saint honoured in Kyle in Scotland (7th century)
- Saint Gerald of Mayo, followed St Colman from Lindisfarne to Ireland and became his successor in the English monastery in Mayo (732)
- Saint Ansovinus, Bishop of Camerino (840) (Note: Born in Camerino in Italy, after living as a hermit at Castel Raimondo near Torcello, he became bishop of his native town. He accepted the office on condition that his see should be exempt from the service of recruiting soldiers, then imposed on most bishops.)
- Saint Heldrad (Eldrad, Eldradus), abbot at Novalesa Abbey for thirty years (842)
- Martyrs Rudericus (Roderick) and Salomon (Solomon), in Córdoba in Spain (857) (Note: Roderick was a priest in Cabra near Cordoba in Spain who was betrayed by his Muslim brother and imprisoned there. In prison he met his fellow-martyr, Salomon. They were both martyred in Cordoba.)

== Post-Schism Orthodox saints ==
=== New martyrs and confessors ===
- New Hieromartyr Nicholas Popov, Priest (1919)
- New Hieromartyr Gregory Pospelov, Archpriest, of Kronstadt (1921)
- New Hieromartyr Stephen (Bekh), Bishop of Izhevsk (1933) (Note: See: (in Russian) Стефан (Бех). Википедии. Russian Wikipedia.)
- New Hieromartyr Michael Okolovich, Archpriest, of Irkutsk (1938)

== Other commemorations ==
- Translation of the relics (846) of St. Nicephorus the Confessor, Patriarch of Constantinople (829)
- Repose of Elder Ephraim of Valaam Monastery (1946)
- Repose of Bishop Tikhon (Tikhomirov) of Kyrillov (1955) (Note: See: (in Russian) Тихон (Тихомиров). Википедии. Russian Wikipedia.)

== Icon gallery ==
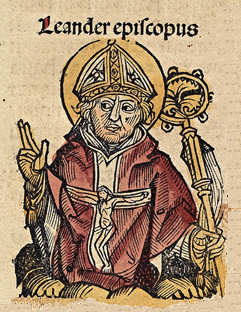
St. Leander of Seville.

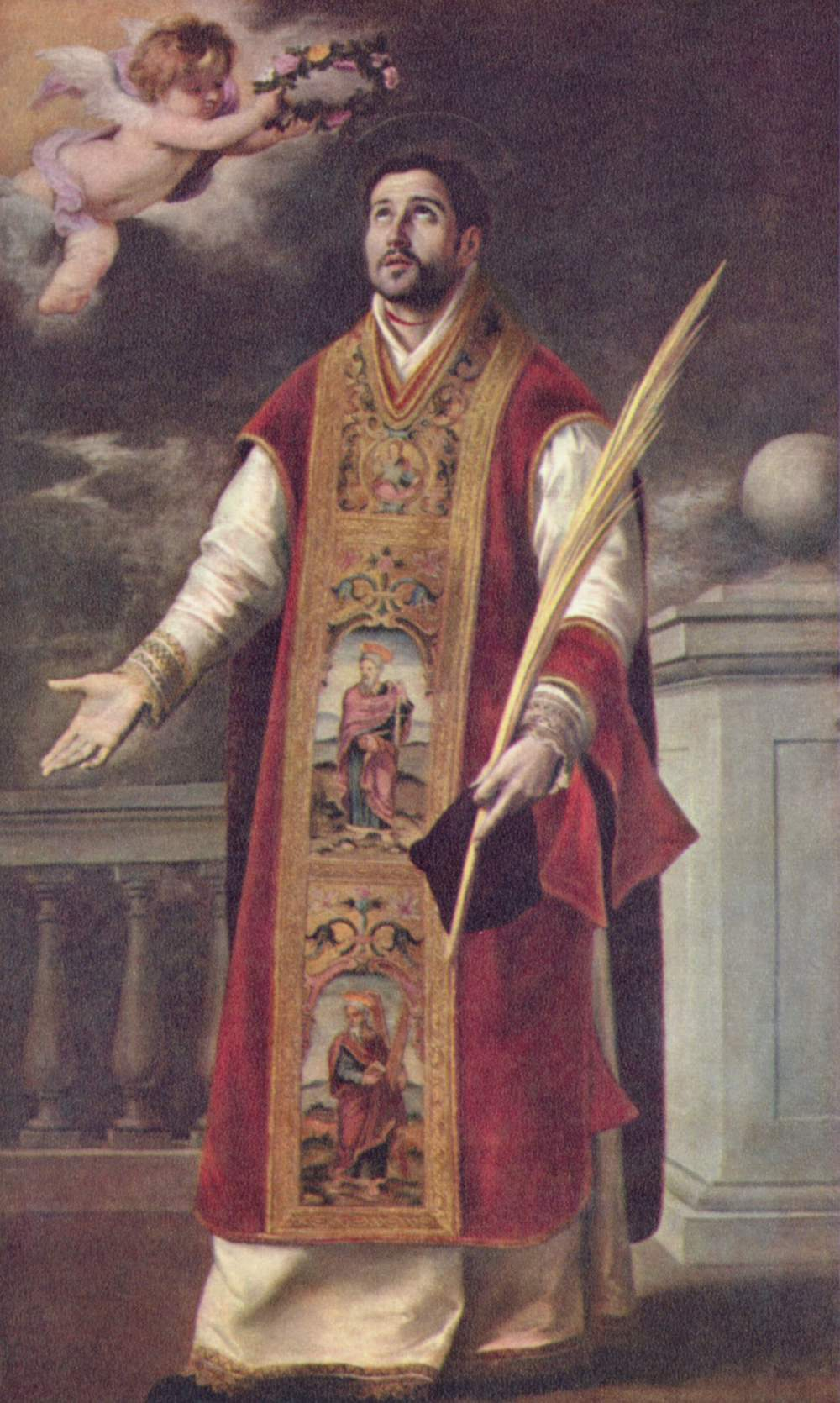
St. Roderick of Córdoba.

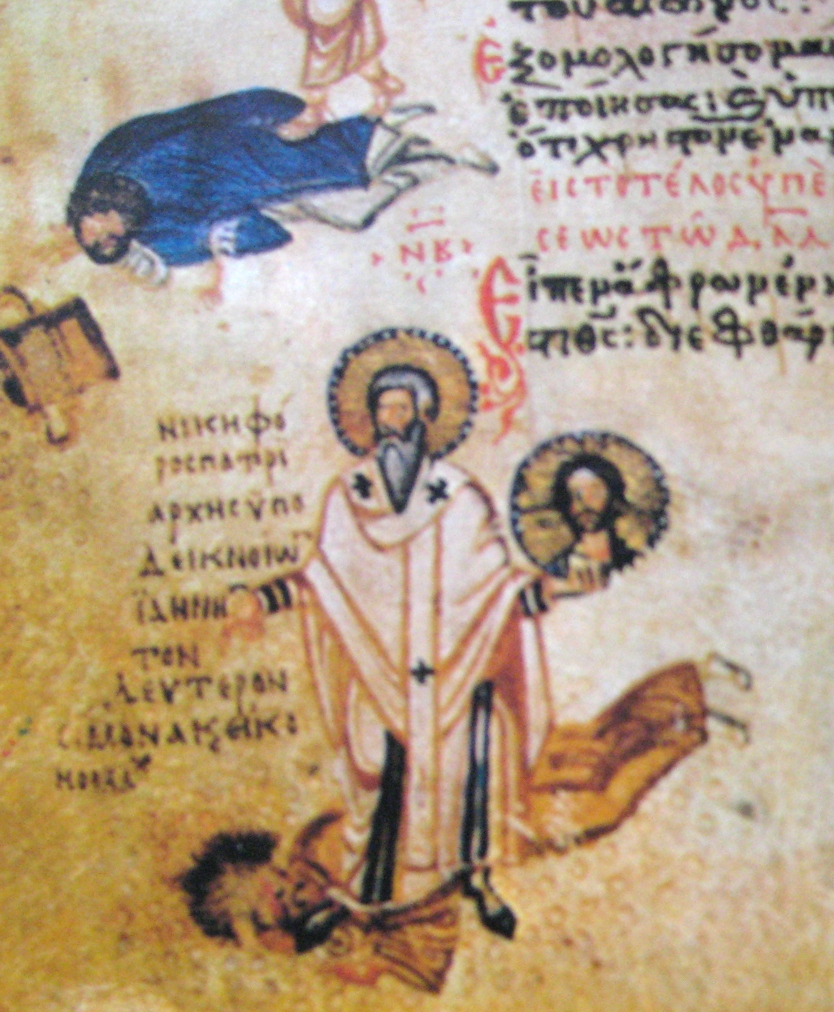
St. Nicephorus the Confessor trampling on the iconoclast Emperor John VII Grammatikos.

== Sources ==
- March 13/March 26. Orthodox Calendar (PRAVOSLAVIE.RU).
- March 26 / March 13. HOLY TRINITY RUSSIAN ORTHODOX CHURCH (A parish of the Patriarchate of Moscow).
- March 13. OCA - The Lives of the Saints.
- The Autonomous Orthodox Metropolia of Western Europe and the Americas (ROCOR). St. Hilarion Calendar of Saints for the year of our Lord 2004. St. Hilarion Press (Austin, TX). p.21.
- March 13. Latin Saints of the Orthodox Patriarchate of Rome.
- The Roman Martyrology. Transl. by the Archbishop of Baltimore. Last Edition, According to the Copy Printed at Rome in 1914. Revised Edition, with the Imprimatur of His Eminence Cardinal Gibbons. Baltimore: John Murphy Company, 1916. pp.74-75.

Greek Sources

- Great Synaxaristes: (in Greek) 13 ΜΑΡΤΙΟΥ. ΜΕΓΑΣ ΣΥΝΑΞΑΡΙΣΤΗΣ.
- (in Greek) Συναξαριστής. 13 Μαρτίου. ECCLESIA.GR. (H ΕΚΚΛΗΣΙΑ ΤΗΣ ΕΛΛΑΔΟΣ).

Russian Sources

- (in Russian) 26 марта (13 марта). Православная Энциклопедия под редакцией Патриарха Московского и всея Руси Кирилла (электронная версия). (Orthodox Encyclopedia - Pravenc.ru).
- (in Russian) 13 марта (ст.ст.) 26 марта 2013 (нов. ст.). Русская Православная Церковь Отдел внешних церковных связей. (DECR).
