= Saint Nestor =

Saint Nestor may refer to:

- Nestor of Magydos (died 250)
- Nestor of Thessaloniki (died c. 300)
- Nestor the Chronicler (c. 1056 – c. 1114)
- Nestor Savchuk (1960–1993), Russian Orthodox hieromonk
