= February 16 (Eastern Orthodox liturgics) =

Day in the Eastern Orthodox liturgical calendar

Eastern Orthodox liturgical calendar
February 15	February 16	February 17
February 16 O.S. ≍ March 1 (or February 29 (Note: in a leap year)) N.S. February 16 N.S ≍ February 3 O.S.

An Eastern Orthodox cross

February 16 in Eastern Orthodox liturgical calendars is a feast day and a day of commemoration of saints and martyrs. Although some Orthodox churches use the Revised Julian Calendar and others use the traditional Julian calendar, the fixed commemorations for their respective February 16 are broadly the same, no matter which calendar is used. (Note: Despite the dates being the same, the days to which they refer typically differ by 13 days. The notation Old Style or O.S. is sometimes used to indicate a date in the traditional Julian Calendar (the "Old Calendar"). The notation New Style or N.S. indicates a date in the Revised Julian calendar (the "New Calendar").)

== Saints ==
- Hieromartyrs Pamphilus of Caesarea, Priest, and 11 companions, at Caesarea in Palaestina (c. 307-309): (Note: "At Caesarea, in Palestine, the holy martyrs Elias, Jeremias, Isaias, Samuel, and Daniel, Egyptians, who of their own accord served the confessors of Christ condemned to labor in the mines of Cilicia, but were arrested on their return, and after being cruelly tortured by the governor Firmilian, under the emperor Galerius Maximian, were put to the sword. After them, St. Porphyry, servant of the martyr Pamphilus, and St. Seleucus, a Cappadocian, who had been victorious in several combats, being again exposed to torments, won the crown of martyrdom, the one by fire, the other by the sword.")

- Valens, Deacon, and Martyrs Paul, Seleucus, Porphyrius, Julian, Theodulus, Elias, Jeremiah, Isaiah, Samuel, and Daniel.

- Saint Maruthas of Martyropolis, Bishop of Sophene and Martyropolis (422), and the Martyrs of Persia (4th century), whose relics rest in Martyropolis.
- Saint Flavian I of Antioch, Archbishop of Antioch (404) (see also: September 27)
- Saint Flavian the Confessor, Archbishop of Constantinople (449)
- Venerable Flavian the Hermit, monastic and Wonderworker. (Note: Venerable Flavian followed the monastic state and that of asceticism from a young age. It is said that he went to the top of a mountain and spent sixty and some odd years there in fasting and prayer. God blessed him as a Wonderworker and he reposed in peace.)
- Saint Mary the New, of Byzia in Thrace (9th century)

== Pre-Schism Western saints ==
- Saint Onesimus, of the Seventy Apostles (c. 68) (Note: The slave who ran away from his master Philemon, was converted by St Paul in Rome and was the occasion of the Apostle's letter to Philemon.) (Note: "THE birthday of blessed Onesimus, concerning whom the apostle St. Paul wrote to Philemon. He made him bishop of Ephesus after St. Timothy, and committed to him the office of preaching. Being led a prisoner to Kome, and stoned to death for the faith of Christ, he was buried in that city; but his body was afterwards carried to the place where he had been bishop.") (see also: February 15)
- Saint Honestus (Honestus of Nîmes), a disciple of Saturninus of Toulouse, who preached the Gospel in Spain (270)
- Saint Faustinus of Brescia, Bishop of Brescia and Confessor (381) (Note: The successor of St. Ursicinus about the year 360, as Bishop of Brescia in Italy. He was a descendant of Sts. Faustinus and Jovita and compiled their Acts.)
- Hieromartyr Tanco of Verden, Bishop of Verden (815)

== Post-Schism Orthodox saints ==
- New Monk-martyr Romanus of Karpenision and Kapsokalyvia, Mount Athos, at Constantinople (1694) (see also January 5)
- Saint Basil Gryaznov of Pavlovo-Posadsky (1869)
- Saint Macarius (Nevsky), Metropolitan of Moscow, Apostle to the Altai (1926)
- Saint Nicholas of Japan, Archbishop and Equal-to-the-Apostles (1912) (New Calendar date see also: February 3)

=== New martyrs and confessors ===
- New Hieromartyr Peter Lagov, Priest (1931)
- New Hieromartyr Elias Chetverukhin, Priest, of Moscow (1934)
- New Hieromartyr Paul, Priest (1938)

== Other commemorations ==
- Translation of the relics of Virgin-martyr Juliana of Nicomedia (304) (Note: "At Cumae, in Campania, the Translation of St. Juliana, virgin and martyr. Under the emperor Maximian, she was first severely scourged by her own father, Africanus, then made to suffer many torments by the prefect, Evilasius, whom she had refused to marry. Later being thrown into prison, she encountered the evil spirit in a visible manner. Finally, as a fiery furnace and a caldron of boiling oil could do her no injury, she terminated her martyrdom by decapitation.") (see also December 21)
- Synaxis of the 'Cypriot' Icon of the Theotokos.

== Icon gallery ==
Athonite Fresco of the Martyrdom of St. Pamphilos of Caesarea and his companions.
(Dionysiou Monastery, 1547).

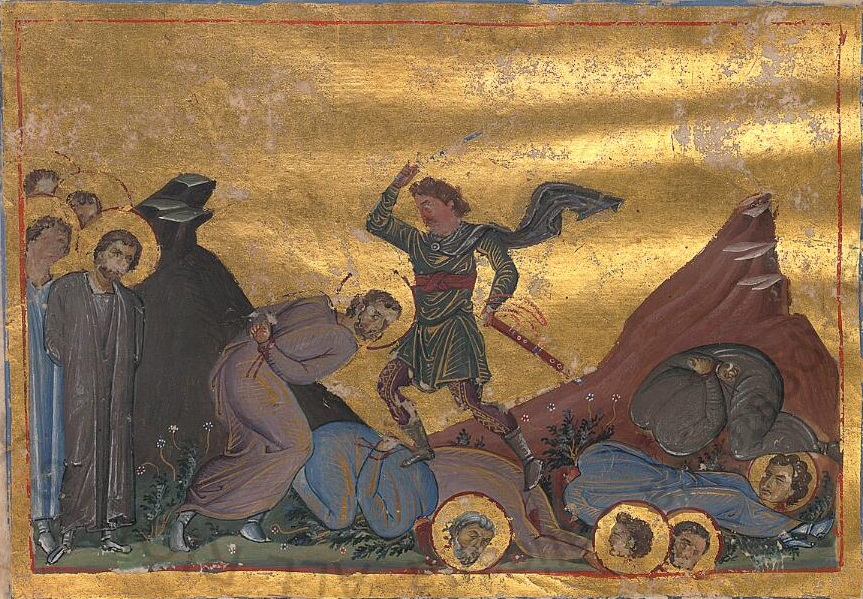
Hieromartyr Pamphilus of Caesarea and companions, at Caesarea in Palaestina.
(Menologion of Basil II, 10th century).

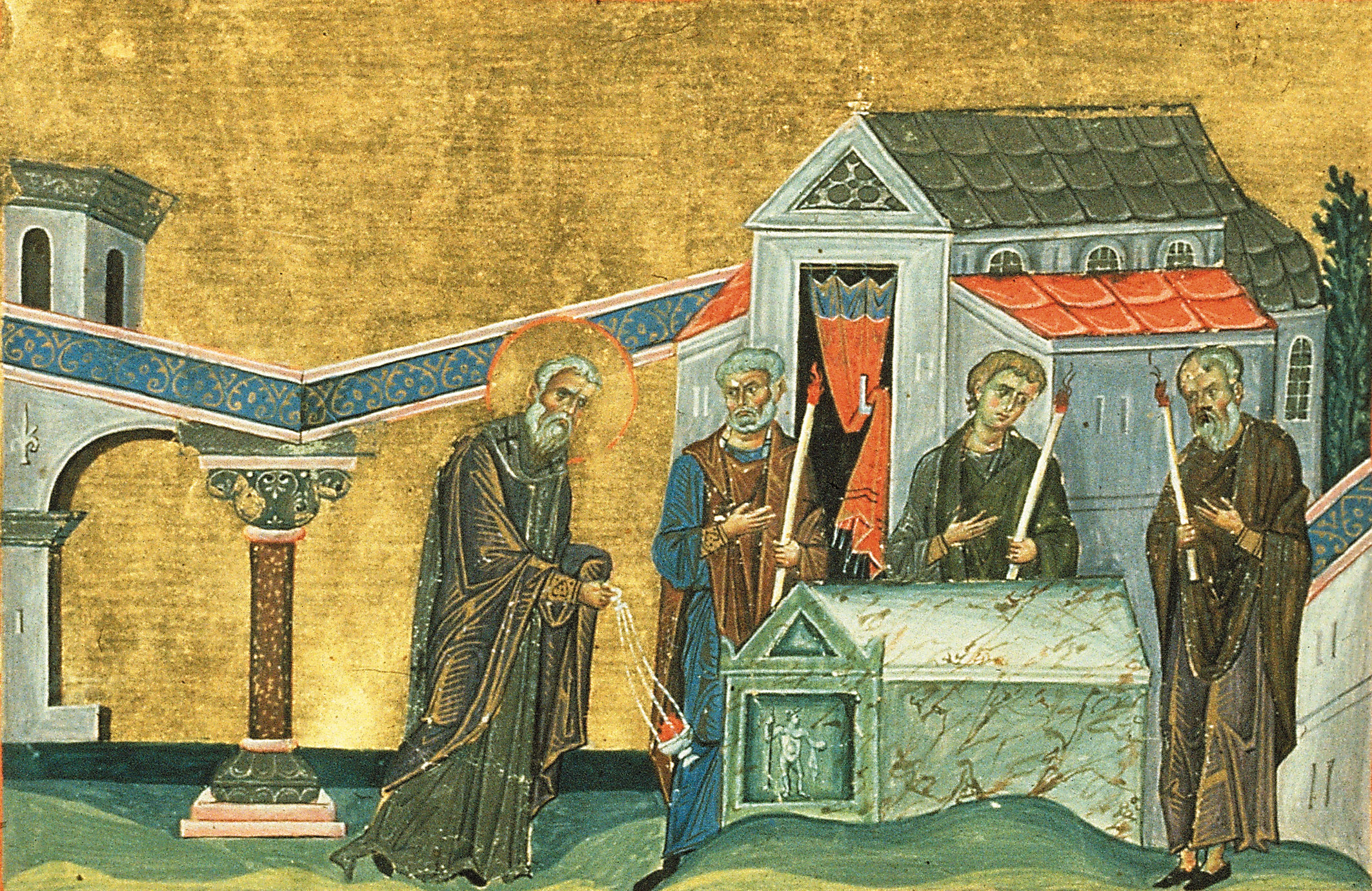
St. Maruthas of Martyropolis, Bp. of Sophene and Martyropolis.
(Menologion of Basil II, 10th century).

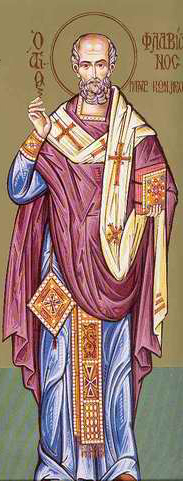
St. Flavian the Confessor, Abp. of Constantinople.

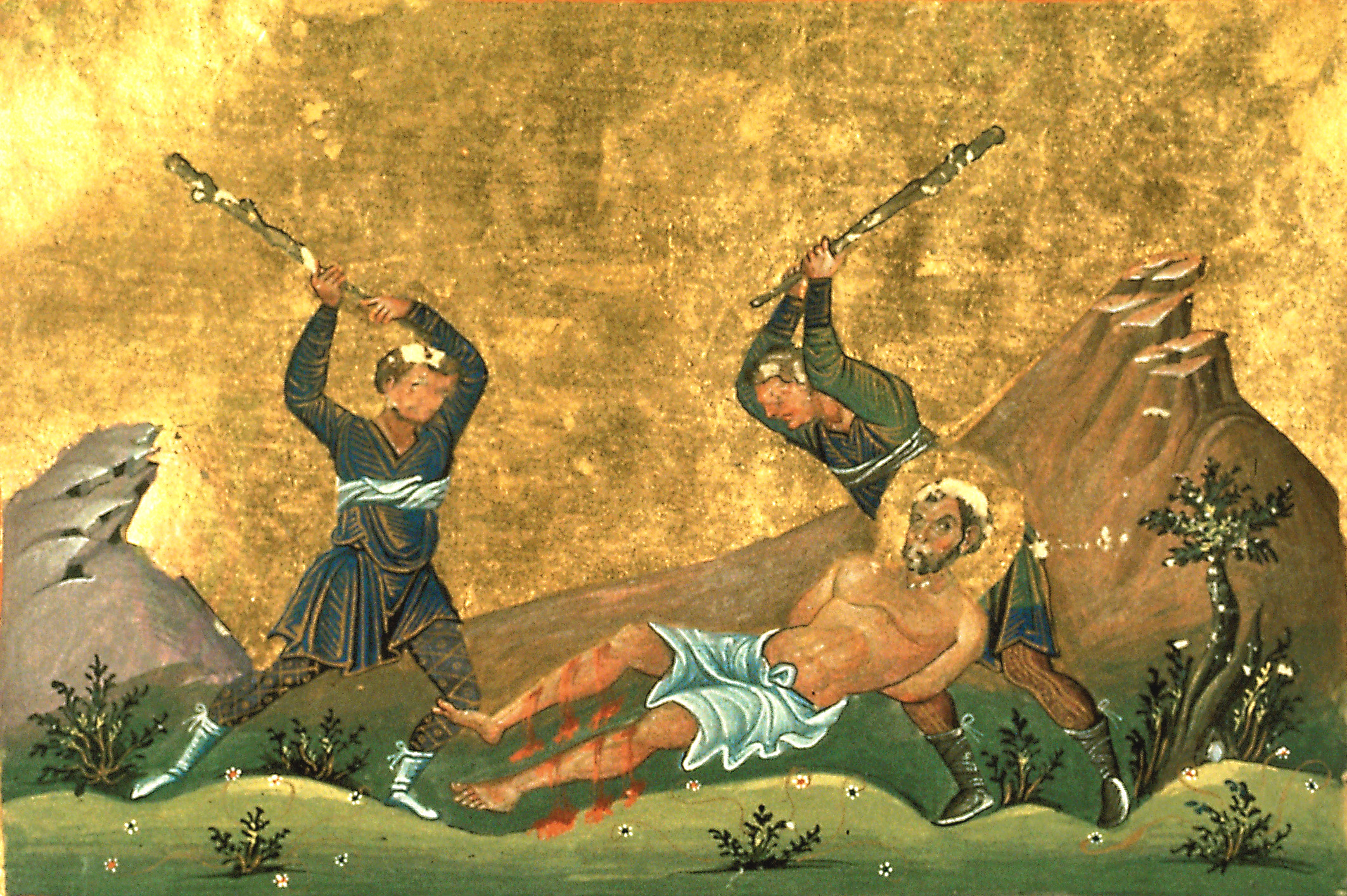
Martyrdom of St. Onesimus.
(Menologion of Basil II, 10th century).

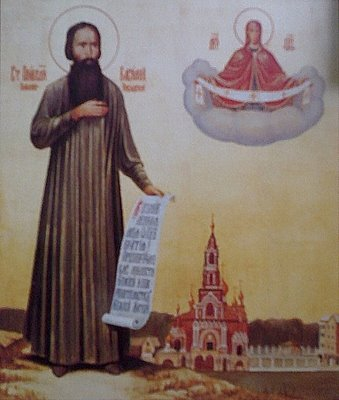
St. Basil Gryaznov of Pavlovo-Posadsky.

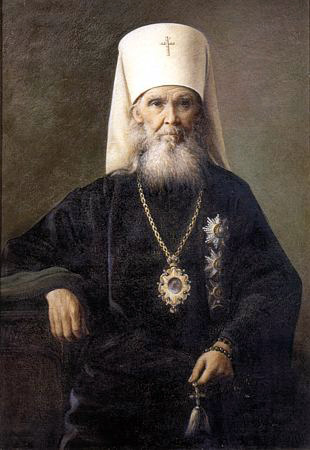
St Macarius (Nevsky), Metropolitan of Moscow, Apostle to the Altai.

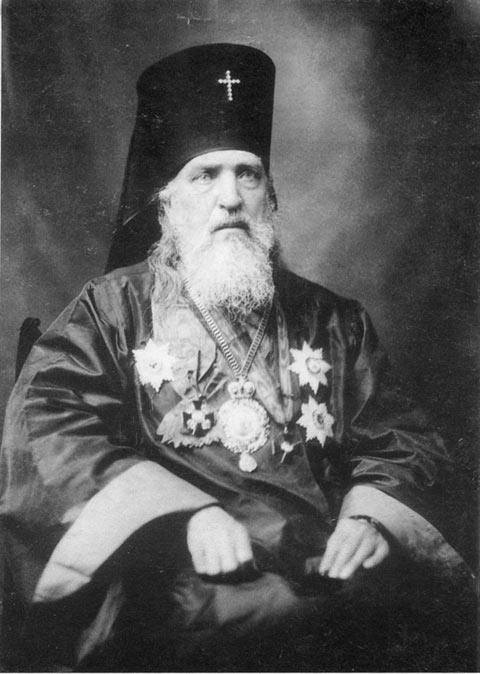
St. Nicholas of Japan.

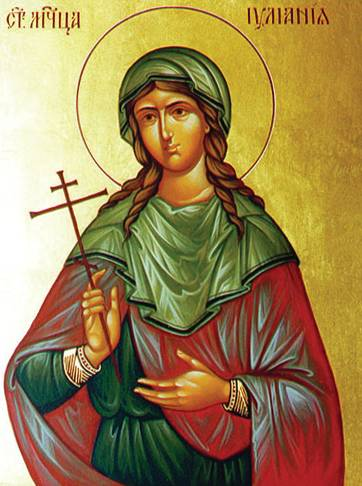
Virgin-martyr Juliana of Nicomedia.

== Sources ==
- February 16 / March 1. Orthodox Calendar (Pravoslavie.ru).
- March 1 / February 16. Holy Trinity Russian Orthodox Church (A parish of the Patriarchate of Moscow).
- February 16. OCA - The Lives of the Saints.
- The Autonomous Orthodox Metropolia of Western Europe and the Americas. St. Hilarion Calendar of Saints for the year of our Lord 2004. St. Hilarion Press (Austin, TX). p. 15.
- The Sixteenth Day Day of the Month of February. Orthodoxy in China.
- February 16. Latin Saints of the Orthodox Patriarchate of Rome.
- The Roman Martyrology. Transl. by the Archbishop of Baltimore. Last Edition, According to the Copy Printed at Rome in 1914. Revised Edition, with the Imprimatur of His Eminence Cardinal Gibbons. Baltimore: John Murphy Company, 1916. pp. 49–50.
- Rev. Richard Stanton. A Menology of England and Wales, or, Brief Memorials of the Ancient British and English Saints Arranged According to the Calendar, Together with the Martyrs of the 16th and 17th Centuries. London: Burns & Oates, 1892. p. 72.

Greek Sources

- Great Synaxaristes: (in Greek) 16 Φεβρουαρίου. Μεγασ Συναξαριστησ.
- (in Greek) Συναξαριστής. 16 Φεβρουαρίου. Ecclesia.gr. (H Εκκλησια Τησ Ελλαδοσ).

Russian Sources

- (in Russian) 1 марта (16 февраля). Православная Энциклопедия под редакцией Патриарха Московского и всея Руси Кирилла (электронная версия). (Orthodox Encyclopedia - Pravenc.ru).
