= Hermopolis (disambiguation) =

Hermopolis may refer to:

- Hermopolis (Hermopolis Magna), the capital of the 15th nome of Upper Egypt
- Hermopolis Parva, a large city of the 7th nome of Lower Egypt
- Hermopolis (Lower Egypt), the capital of the 15th nome of Lower Egypt
- Hermopolis (Butosos), a smaller city downstream from Butos
- Ermoupoli, the capital of Syros and Cyclades, Greece
