= Saint Roderick (Murillo) =

Painting by Bartolomé Esteban Murillo

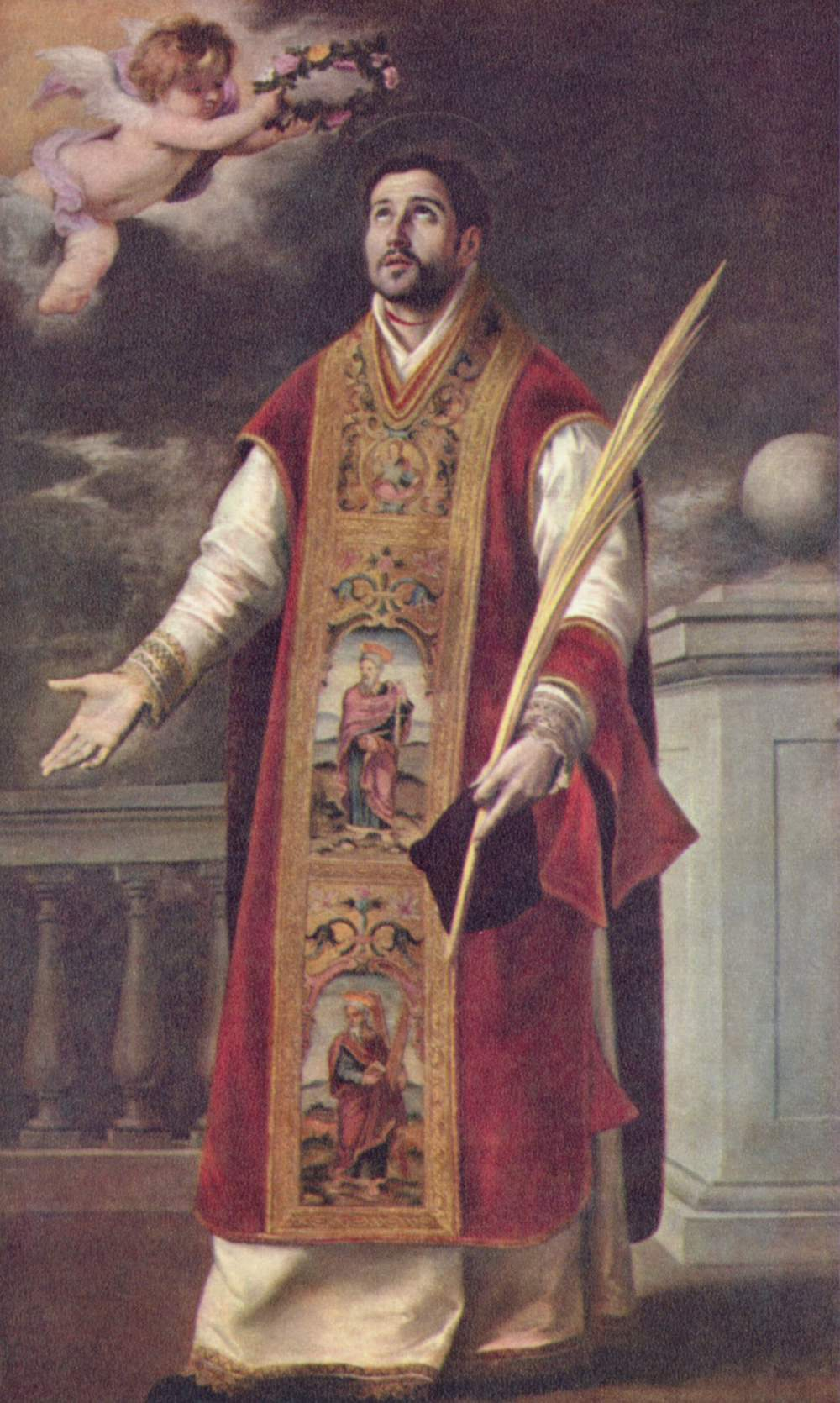
Saint Roderick (c. 1650-1655) by Bartolomé Esteban Murillo

Saint Roderick is a c. 1650-1655 oil on canvas painting of Saint Roderick by Murillo, now in the Gemaldegalerie Alte Meister in Dresden. He is shown vested as a priest in a chasuble (with a central motif of Saint Andrew and Saint Peter) and a maniple and holding a biretta and a martyr's palm.
