= March 14 (Eastern Orthodox liturgics) =

Day in the Eastern Orthodox liturgical calendar

Eastern Orthodox liturgical calendar
March 13	March 14	March 15
March 14 O.S. ≍ March 27 N.S. March 14 N.S ≍ March 1 O.S.

An Eastern Orthodox cross

March 14 in Eastern Orthodox liturgical calendars is a feast day and a day of commemoration of saints and martyrs. Although some Orthodox churches use the Revised Julian Calendar and others use the traditional Julian calendar, the fixed commemorations for their respective March 14 are broadly the same, no matter which calendar is used. (Note: Despite the dates being the same, the days to which they refer typically differ by 13 days. The notation Old Style or O.S. is sometimes used to indicate a date in the traditional Julian Calendar (the "Old Calendar"). The notation New Style or N.S. indicates a date in the Revised Julian calendar (the "New Calendar").)

== Saints ==
- Martyrs Basil and Euphrasius, together with other Christians, in Thessaloniki.
- Martyr Florentius, in Thessaloniki, by fire. (see also: October 13)
- Martyr Alexander, in Thessaloniki (c. 285-305). (Note: Also Alexander of Pydnus (Pydnus, near Katerini); (in Greek): Ὁ Ἅγιος Ἀλέξανδρος Θεσσαλονίκης εἶναι ὁ αὐτὸς μὲ τὸν ὁμώνυμό του Ἅγιο Ἀλέξανδρο Πύδνης († 14 Μαρτίου).)
- Martyr Eustathius and his company, at Carrhae, Mesopotamia (741) (Note: "At Carrhae, in Mesopotamia, the Patrician St. Eutychius and his companions, who were killed by Evelid, king of Arabia, for the confession of the faith.")
- Venerable Euschemon the Confessor, Bishop of Lampsacus (9th century) (Note: He suffered for the holy icons under the iconoclast emperor Theophilus (829-842), and having been imprisoned, he was sent into exile and died.)

== Pre-Schism Western saints ==
- Holy 47 Martyrs of Rome, baptised by the Apostle Peter, and suffered in Rome under Nero, all on the same day (c. 67)
- Hieromartyr Leo, Bishop and Martyr, perhaps under the Arians, in the Agro Verano in Italy.
- Martyrs Peter and Aphrodisius, who obtained the crown of martyrdom in the persecution of the Vandals (5th century)
- Monk-Martyrs of Valeria, in the province of Valeria, Italy, slain by the Lombards (5th century) (Note: "In the province of Valeria, two saintly monks, who were hanged on a tree by the Lombards, and though dead, were heard singing psalms even by their enemies.")
- Venerable Benedict of Nursia, Abbot (543) (see also: July 11 - Translation)
- Saint Diaconus, a deacon in the Marsi in central Italy, martyred together with two monks by the Lombards (6th century)
- Saint Boniface Curetán, a Scoto-Pictish Bishop of Ross (c. 630 or 660) (Note: Bishop of Ross, very likely a Roman by birth, he enlightened the Picts and Scots. He is said to have founded a great many churches.)
- Saint Talmach, a disciple of St Barr at Lough Erc in Ireland, and founder of a monastery (7th century)
- Saint Matilda (Mathildis, Maud), wife of German king Henry the Fowler, who founded, among others, the monasteries of Nordhausen, Pöhlde, Engern and Quedlinburg in Germany (968)

== Post-Schism Orthodox saints ==
- Saint Rostislav-Michael, Great Prince of Kiev (1167)
- Saint Theognostus of Kiev, the Greek Metropolitan of Kiev and all Rus' (1353) (Note: It was through his influence that the Grand Prince Simeon sent money to the Byzantine Emperor John Cantacuzene for repairs to the Great Church of Hagia Sophia.)
- Venerable Andreas (Andrew), Abbot, of the Holy Trinity Monastery in Rafailovo, Siberia (1820) (Note: The Venerable Saint Andrew was born in 1746 in Russia. He became an ascetic at the Holy Trinity Monastery of Rafailovo, Tyumen, near the Diocese of Tobolsk, where he also served as the Igumen (Abbot). Later he continued his life at the Monastery of St Symeon in Moscow. The Venerable Andrew reposed in peace in the year 1820.)

== Other commemorations ==
- Icon of the Most Holy Theotokos of St. Theodore ("Feodorovskaya"), Kostroma (1239, 1613) (Note: This was the cell icon of St Alexander Nevsky. The year 2013 marks the 400th anniversary of the glorification of the Theodore Icon of the Mother of God, for the election to the throne of Mikhail Fedorovich Romanov (Michael I of Russia).) (see also: August 16)
- Repose of Blessed John, Fool-for-Christ of Yurievets (1893)

== Icon gallery ==
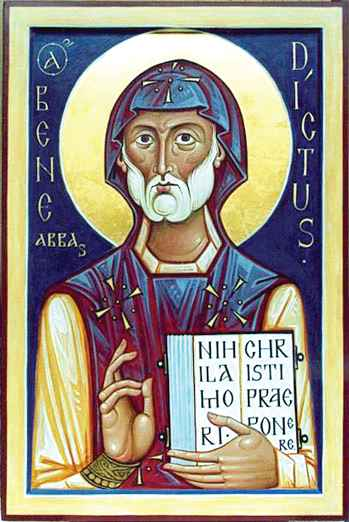
St. Benedict of Nursia.

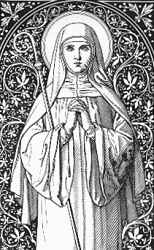
Saint Matilda.

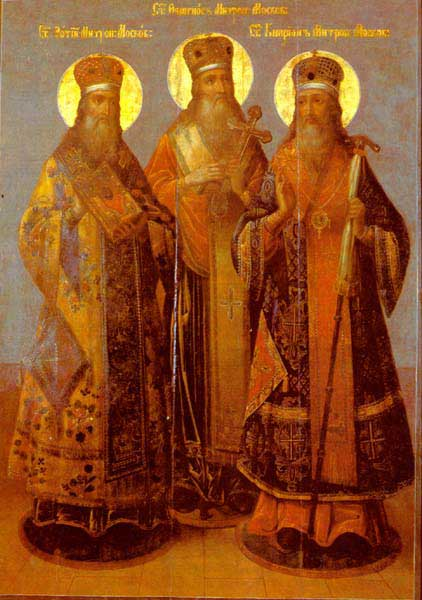
Metropolitans of Kiev and all Rus': Photius, Theognostus (center), and Cyprian.

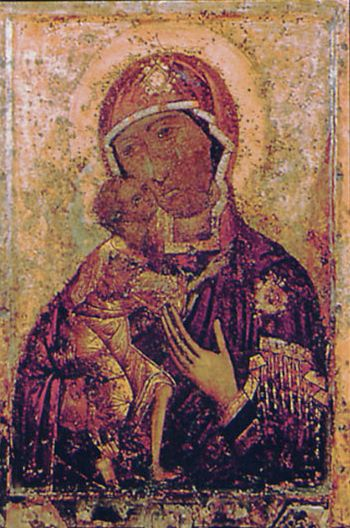
Theotokos of St. Theodore, original icon from Epiphany Monastery in Kostroma.

== Sources ==
- March 14/March 27. Orthodox Calendar (PRAVOSLAVIE.RU).
- March 27 / March 14. HOLY TRINITY RUSSIAN ORTHODOX CHURCH (A parish of the Patriarchate of Moscow).
- March 14. OCA - The Lives of the Saints.
- The Autonomous Orthodox Metropolia of Western Europe and the Americas (ROCOR). St. Hilarion Calendar of Saints for the year of our Lord 2004. St. Hilarion Press (Austin, TX). p.21.
- March 14. Latin Saints of the Orthodox Patriarchate of Rome.
- The Roman Martyrology. Transl. by the Archbishop of Baltimore. Last Edition, According to the Copy Printed at Rome in 1914. Revised Edition, with the Imprimatur of His Eminence Cardinal Gibbons. Baltimore: John Murphy Company, 1916. pp.75-76.

Greek Sources

- Great Synaxaristes: (in Greek) 14 ΜΑΡΤΙΟΥ. ΜΕΓΑΣ ΣΥΝΑΞΑΡΙΣΤΗΣ.
- (in Greek) Συναξαριστής. 14 Μαρτίου. ECCLESIA.GR. (H ΕΚΚΛΗΣΙΑ ΤΗΣ ΕΛΛΑΔΟΣ).

Russian Sources

- (in Russian) 27 марта (14 марта). Православная Энциклопедия под редакцией Патриарха Московского и всея Руси Кирилла (электронная версия). (Orthodox Encyclopedia - Pravenc.ru).
- (in Russian) 14 марта (ст.ст.) 27 марта 2013 (нов. ст.). Русская Православная Церковь Отдел внешних церковных связей. (DECR).
