= March 1 (Eastern Orthodox liturgics) =

Day in the Eastern Orthodox liturgical calendar

Eastern Orthodox liturgical calendar
February 28 (or February 29 (Note: in a leap year))	March 1	March 2
March 1 O.S. ≍ March 14 N.S. March 1 N.S ≍ February 16 (or February 17) O.S.

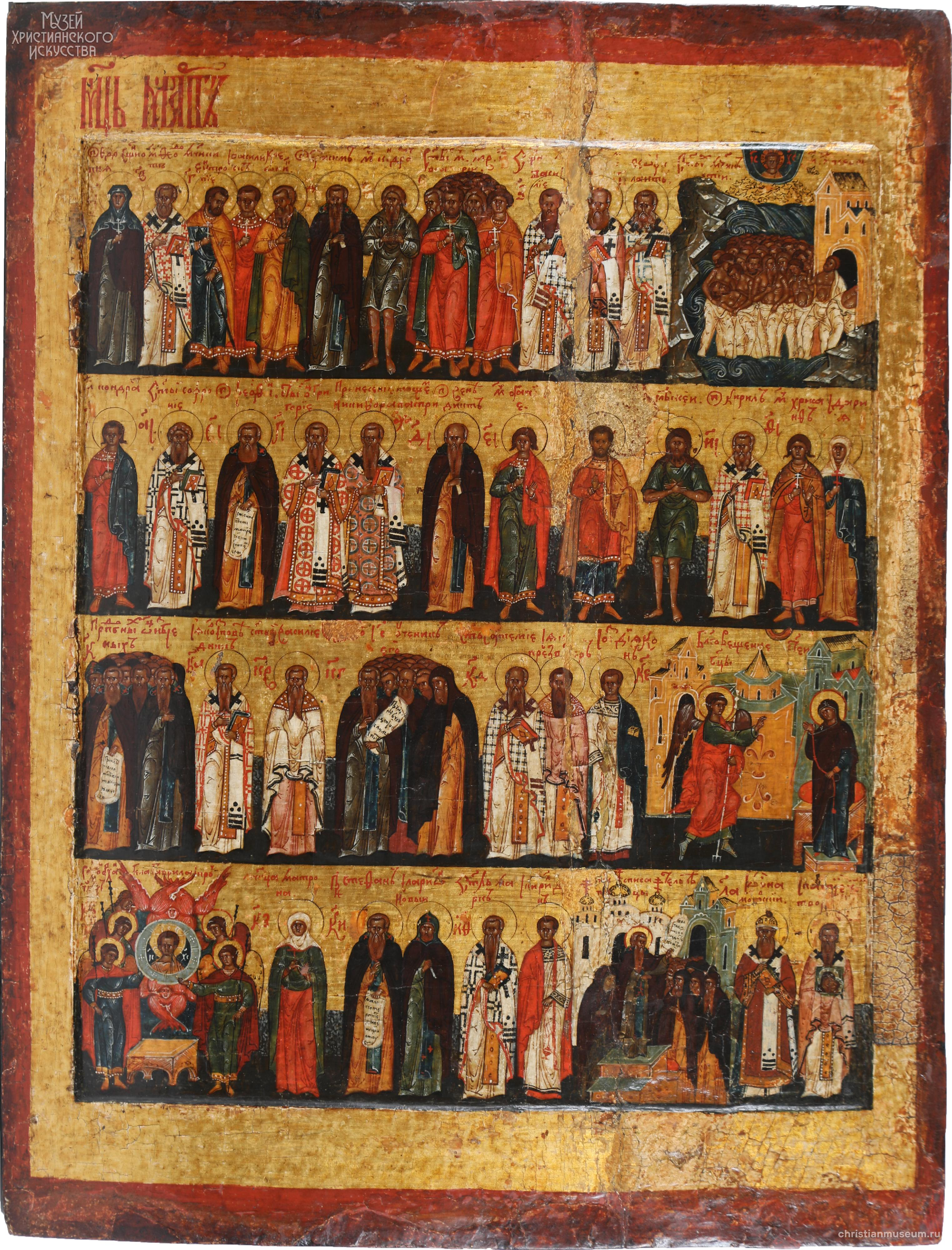
Menaion calendar icon - March

March 1 in Eastern Orthodox liturgical calendars is a feast day and a day of commemoration of saints and martyrs. Although some Orthodox churches use the Revised Julian Calendar and others use the traditional Julian calendar, the fixed commemorations for their respective March 1 are broadly the same, no matter which calendar is used. (Note: Despite the dates being the same, the days to which they refer typically differ by 13 days. The notation Old Style or O.S. is sometimes used to indicate a date in the traditional Julian Calendar (the "Old Calendar"). The notation New Style or N.S. indicates a date in the Revised Julian calendar (the "New Calendar").)

== Saints ==
- Righteous martyr Eudokia of Heliopolis (107) (Note: Kontakion. Fourth Tone. "When thou wast brought up from the mire of transgressions, like a most precious stone whose brightness is darkened, repentance made thee shine again with godliness, and when thou hadst reached the height of ascetical striving, Christ made thee illustrious with the glory of contest, and hath bestowed on thee His grace to heal, O wise Eudocia, thou rival of angel-kind.") (Note: "At Heliopolis, in the persecution of Trajan, St. Eudoxia, martyr, - who, being baptized by bishop Theodotus and fortified for the combat, was put to the sword by the command of the governor Vincent, and thus received the crown of martyrdom.")
- Martyrs Nestorianus (Nestor), Tribimius, Marcellus, and Anthony, of Perge in Pamphylia, by the sword (249-251)
- Martyr Antonina of Nicaea in Bithynia (c. 286-305) (Note: "The same day, St. Antonina, martyr. For deriding the gods of the Gentiles, in the persecution of Diocletian, she was, after various torments, shut up in a cask and drowned in a marsh near the city of Cea.") (see also: June 12)
- Virgin-martyr Domnina of Syria (c. 460)
- Martyrs Antonius, Marcellus, Silvester and Sophronius, in Palestine.
- Martyrs Agapius, Nicephorus and Charisius.
- Saint Silvester. (Note: As indicated in the Jerusalem Canonarion, as follows: (in Greek) «Ἐν τῇ Ἀναστάσει, τοῦ ἁγίου πατριάρχου Σιλβέστρου».)
- Saint Synesius, ascetic of Lysos, Cyprus.

== Pre-Schism Western saints ==
- 260 Martyrs of Rome (c. 269) (Note: "At Rome, two hundred and sixty holy martyrs condemned for the name of Christ. Claudius ordered them to dig sand beyond the Salarian Gate, and then to be shot dead with arrows by soldiers in the amphitheatre.")
- Martyrs Hermes, Adrian and Companions, in Numidia in North Africa under Maximian Herculeus (c. 290)
- Martyr Luperculus (3rd century)
- Martyrs Leo, Donatus, Abundantius, Nicephorus, and nine others - a group of thirteen martyrs who laid down their lives for Christ in North Africa.
- Saint Felix III, Pope of Rome from 483-492 (492) (Note: He was an ancestor of St Gregory the Great. He was Pope of Rome from 483 on. He fought against Monophysitism and Eutychianism and also remedied the evils caused in Africa by numerous apostasies during the Vandal persecution.)
- Saint Herculanus of Perugia, Bishop of Perugia in Italy, beheaded by soldiers of Totila of the Ostrogoths (549) (Note: "At Perugia, the translation of St. Herculanus, bishop and martyr, who was beheaded by order of Totila, king of the Goths. Forty days after his decapitation his body, as pope St. Gregory relates, was found as sound and as firmly joined to the head as if it had never been touched by the sword.") (see also: November 7)
- Saint Albinus of Angers (Aubin) (c. 550)
- Saint David of Wales, patron saint of Wales (c. 589) (Note: "GRANT, we beseech thee, Almighty God: that the devout prayers of blessed David, the Confessor and Bishop, may in such wise succour and defend us, that we which on this day observe his festival, may follow his constancy in the defence of thy true religion. Through Christ our Lord. Amen.")
- Saint Marnock (Marnanus, Marnan, Marnoc) (c. 625) (Note: Born in Ireland, he was with St Columba at Iona and later became a bishop, who reposed in Annandale and was much venerated on the Scottish border. He gave his name to Kilmarnock in Scotland.)
- Saint Suitbert (Swithbert), "Apostle of the Frisians", monastic founder in the Netherlands (713) (Note: "At Kaiserswerth, the bishop St. Swidbert, who, in the time of pope Sergius, preached the Gospel to the inhabitants of Friesland, Holland [sic], and to other Germanic peoples.") (Note: A monk from Northumbria in England who went to Friesland in the Netherlands with St Willibrord in 690. He preached the Gospel here with success. In 693 he was consecrated bishop at Ripon and returned to preach along the right bank of the Rhine in Germany. His work here was undone by Saxon invaders and he withdrew to the small island of Kaiserswerth on the Rhine near Düsseldorf. Here in 710 he founded a monastery, where he reposed and where his relics are still venerated.)
- Saint Siviard, monk at Saint-Calais on the River Anisole in France, who succeeded his father as abbot of the monastery (729)
- Saint Monan (874) (Note: A saint from St Andrew's and a missionary in the Firth of Forth area in Scotland. He was killed by the Danes together with many companions.)
- Venerable Luke of Sicily (Leo Luke of Corleone, Leoluca), Abbot of the Monastery of Mount Mula in Calabria and Wonderworker (c. 915). (Note: Abbot and Wonderworker of the Monastery of Mount Mula in Calabria, and one of the founders of Italo-Greek monasticism in southern Italy and Sicily. He was born in the Sicilian town of Corleone and died about a hundred years later in Monteleone Calabro, now Vibo Valentia, in Calabria. Today he is a patron saint of both towns. He died a centenarian after eighty years of monastic life.)
- Martyrs Gervasius and Leo (Léon I or Leo of Rouen, "Apostle of the Basques" and Bishop of Bayonne), brothers (c. 900). (Note: St. Leo was born in Carentan in France, he became Bishop of Rouen but later preached the Gospel in Navarre in Spain and the Basque provinces, which had been devastated by the Saracens. He was beheaded near Bayonne, where he is the patron-saint.)
- Saint Rudesind, a Galician bishop and abbot (977) (Note: Born of a noble family in Galicia in Spain, he became Bishop of Mondoñedo and then of Compostella. In this capacity he opposed with equal success both the Vikings and the Saracens. Exiled from Compostella through an intrigue, he founded the monastery of Celanova and other monasteries.)

== Post-Schism Orthodox saints ==
- Venerable Agapius of the Vatopedi Monastery on Mount Athos (13th century).
- Venerable Martyrius, Abbot of Zelenetsk in Pskov (1603)
- New martyr Parascevas of Trebizond (1659)

=== New martyrs and confessors ===
- New hieromartyr Methodius, of Russia (1920)
- New martyr Antonina of Kizliar, Abbess (1924)
- New martyr Anastasia Andreyevna, Fool-for-Christ, in the North Caucasus.
- Venerable Mother Zosima of Ennatsky (1935) (Note: On June 11, 2006, on the feast of the Holy Trinity in the Marfo-Mariinsky Convent (or Martha and Mary Convent) in the village of Ira, of the Kumertau district, in the Ufa Diocese, Archbishop Nikon of Ufa and Sterlitamak performed the rite of canonization of Mother Zosima of Ennatsky. Venerable Zosima of Ennatsky is commemorated on the day of her birth and the day of her repose, both of which took place on March 1st.)
- New Hieromartyr Olga (1937)
- New Hieromartyr Peter Lyubimov, Archpriest, of Kishkino, Moscow (1938)
- New Hieromartyrs (1938):

- Basil Nikitsky, John Streltsov, Benjamin Famintsev, and Michael Bukrinsky, priests;
- New Hieromartyr Anthony Korzh, Hierodeacon of Kiziltash Monastery, Crimea;
- Virgin-martyrs Anna, Daria Zaitseva, Eudokia Arkhipov, Alexandra Dyachkova;
- Martyr Basil Arkhipov;
- Virgin-martyr Hope (Nadezhda) Abakumova.

- New Hieromartyr Alexander Ilyenkov of Berdyansk (Simferopol-Crimea), priest (1942) (Note: See also November 1.)
- New Hieromartyr Basil Konstantinov-Grishin, priest (1943)

== Other commemorations ==
- Repose of Barsanuphius (Hrynevich), Archbishop of Tver (1958)

== Icon gallery ==
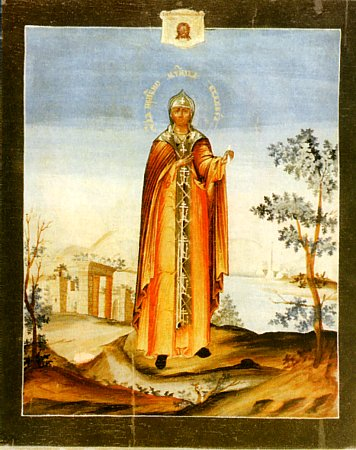
Saint Eudokia of Heliopolis (19th century)

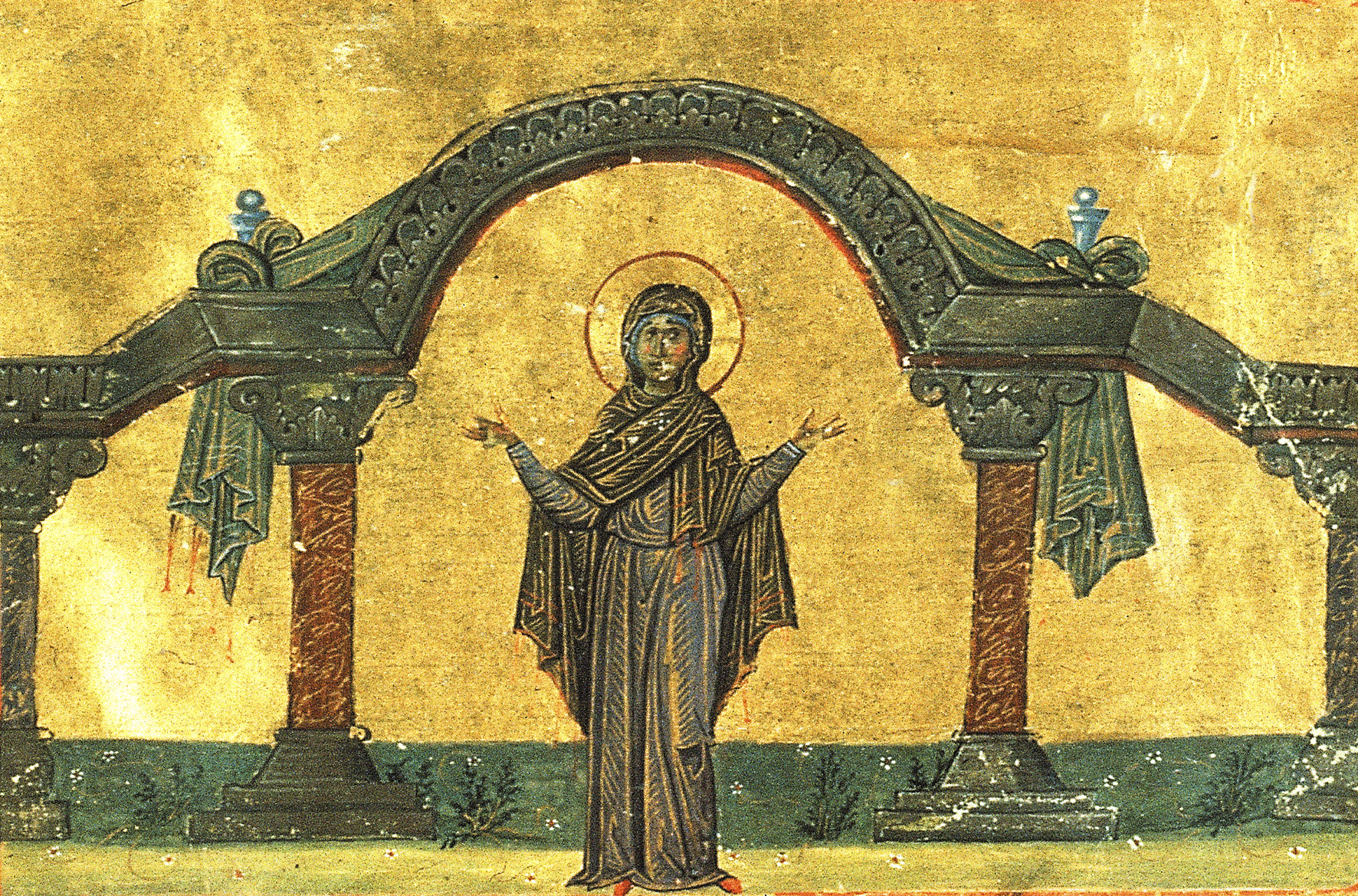
St. Domnina of Syria. Miniature from the Menologion of Basil II (11th century).

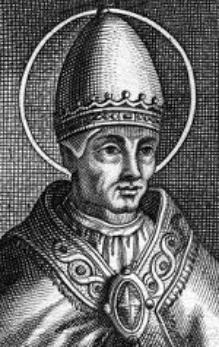
Pope Felix III.

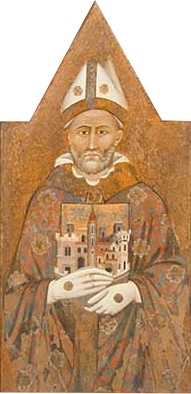
St. Herculanus, patron of Perugia, c. 1320.

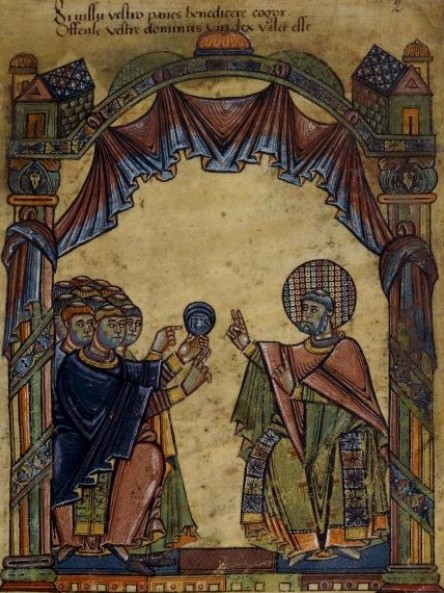
St Albinus of Angers at the Council of Orleans (12th century).

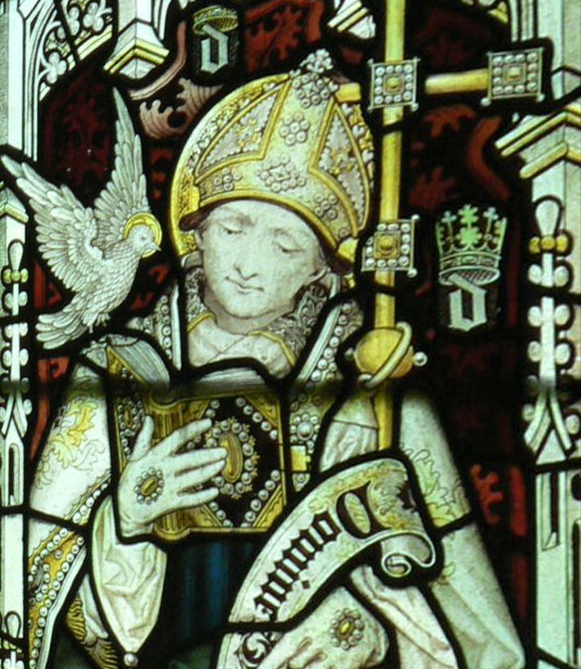
St. David of Wales, 19th-century stained glass window, Oxford.

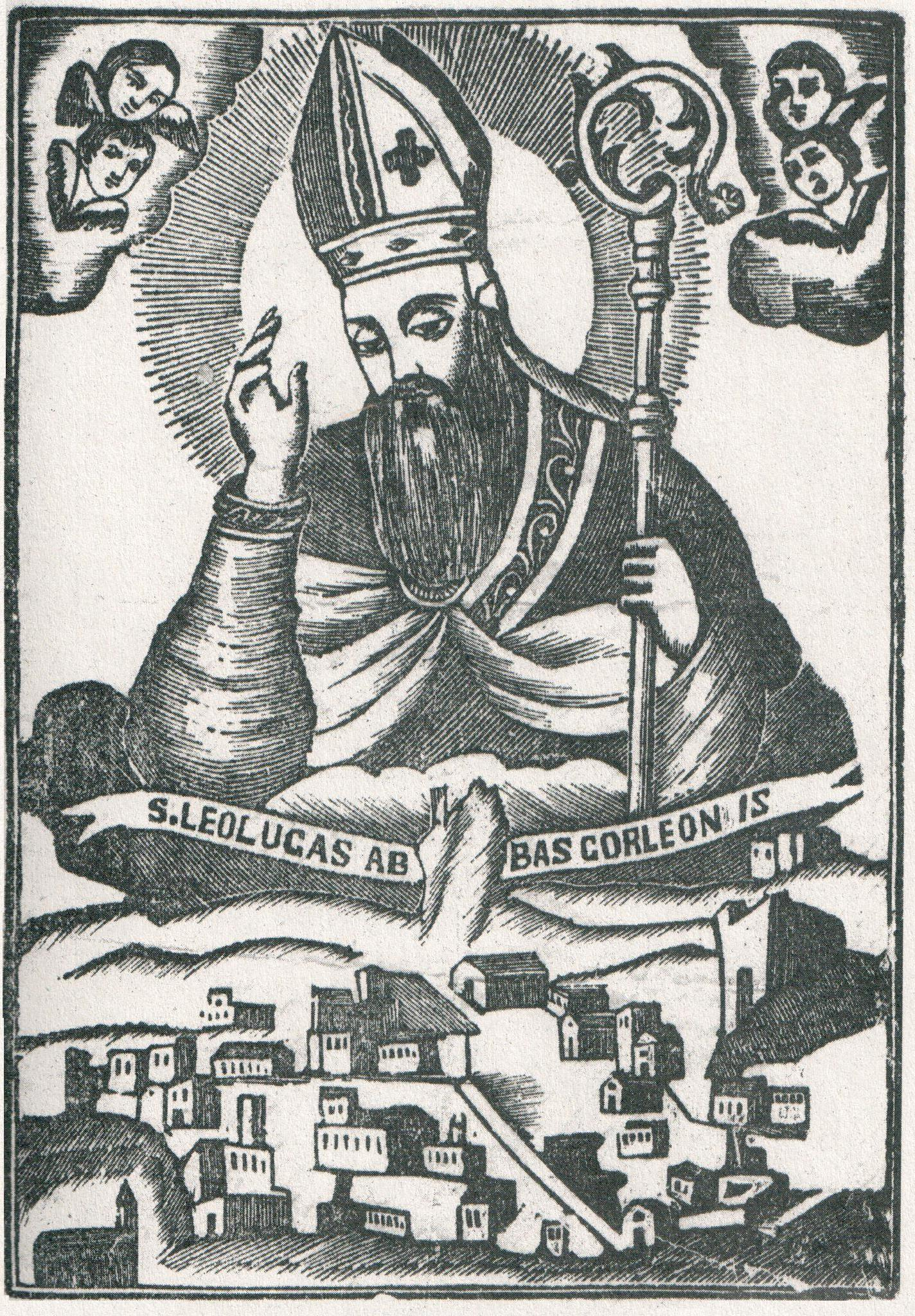
Votive image of St. Luke of Sicily, Abbot and Wonderworker of the Monastery of Mount Mula in Calabria.

== Sources ==
- March 1 / 14. Orthodox Calendar (PRAVOSLAVIE.RU).
- March 14 / March 1. HOLY TRINITY RUSSIAN ORTHODOX CHURCH (A parish of the Patriarchate of Moscow).
- March 1. OCA - The Lives of the Saints.
- March 1. Latin Saints of the Orthodox Patriarchate of Rome.
- The Roman Martyrology. Transl. by the Archbishop of Baltimore. Last Edition, According to the Copy Printed at Rome in 1914. Revised Edition, with the Imprimatur of His Eminence Cardinal Gibbons. Baltimore: John Murphy Company, 1916. pp. 62–63.
- Rev. Richard Stanton. A Menology of England and Wales, or, Brief Memorials of the Ancient British and English Saints Arranged According to the Calendar, Together with the Martyrs of the 16th and 17th Centuries. London: Burns & Oates, 1892. pp. 92–95.

=== Greek Sources ===
- Great Synaxaristes: (in Greek) 1 ΜΑΡΤΙΟΥ. ΜΕΓΑΣ ΣΥΝΑΞΑΡΙΣΤΗΣ.
- (in Greek) Συναξαριστής. 1 Μαρτίου. ECCLESIA.GR. (H ΕΚΚΛΗΣΙΑ ΤΗΣ ΕΛΛΑΔΟΣ).

=== Russian Sources ===
- (in Russian) 14 марта (1 марта). Православная Энциклопедия под редакцией Патриарха Московского и всея Руси Кирилла (электронная версия). (Orthodox Encyclopedia - Pravenc.ru).
- (in Russian) 1 марта (ст.ст.) 14 марта 2013 (нов. ст.). Русская Православная Церковь Отдел внешних церковных связей. (DECR).
