= Hermopolis (Butosos) =

Hermopolis (Greek: Ἑρμοῦ πόλις) also known as Hermopolis Mikra (Ἑρμοῦ πόλις μικρά) and Hermopolis Parva was an ancient city of Egypt. It was located on an island near the city Butosos now Buto (Strabo xvii. p. 802).

== See also ==
- List of ancient Egyptian towns and cities
