= Domnina of Syria =

5th-century ascetic

Saint Domnina of Syria
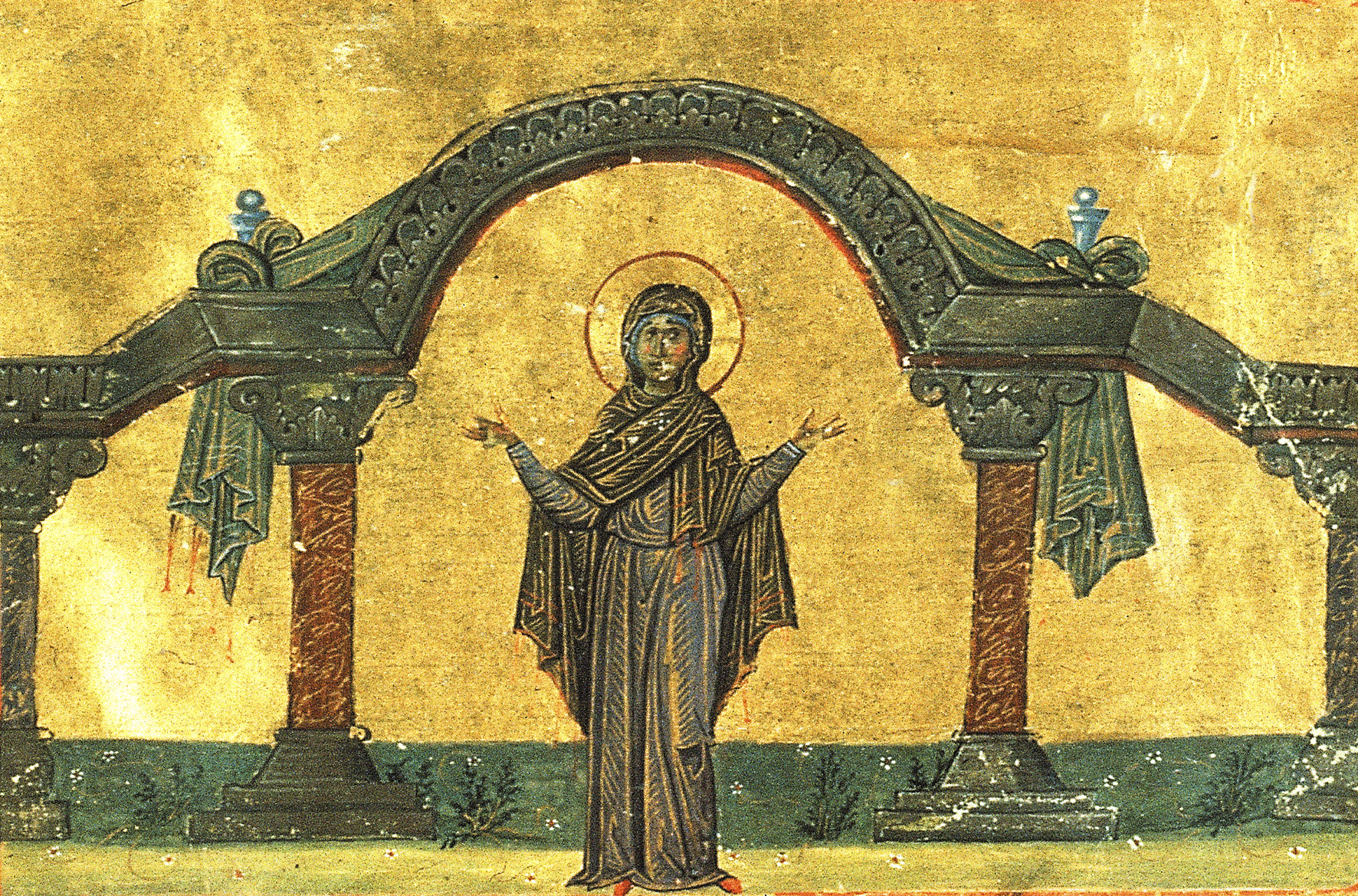
- Miniature from the Menologion of Basil II
- Died: ~460; Syria
- Venerated in: Catholic Church; Eastern Orthodox Church
- Feast: March 1

Saint Domnina of Syria (Greek: Δομνίνα Συρίας) also known as Domnina the Younger, was a 5th-century ascetic. Her name is mentioned in the Byzantine Synaxarium. and according to Theodoret, bishop of Cyrrhus, Domnina was born to a rich Syrian family.

== Life ==
She became a disciple of Saint Maron.

As a young woman she constructed a straw-covered hut in the garden of her mother's house, located in Cyrrhus near Antioch.

She passed all of her life there, to the point where she became extremely thin. She only ate lentils soaked in water and went to church in the morning and in the evening. Domnina covered her face in a veil so that no one could see her face. She had 250 female followers, who passed the time doing manual labor and carding wool.

Theodoret writes, in his Religious History (chap. XXX in Patrologia Graeca), that Domnina acquired such a state of religious ecstasy that she could not speak without weeping as she was considered to have been inspired by the love of God.

She died between 450 and 460 AD.
