= Nestor of Magydos =

Bishop of Magydos and saint

Saint Nestor
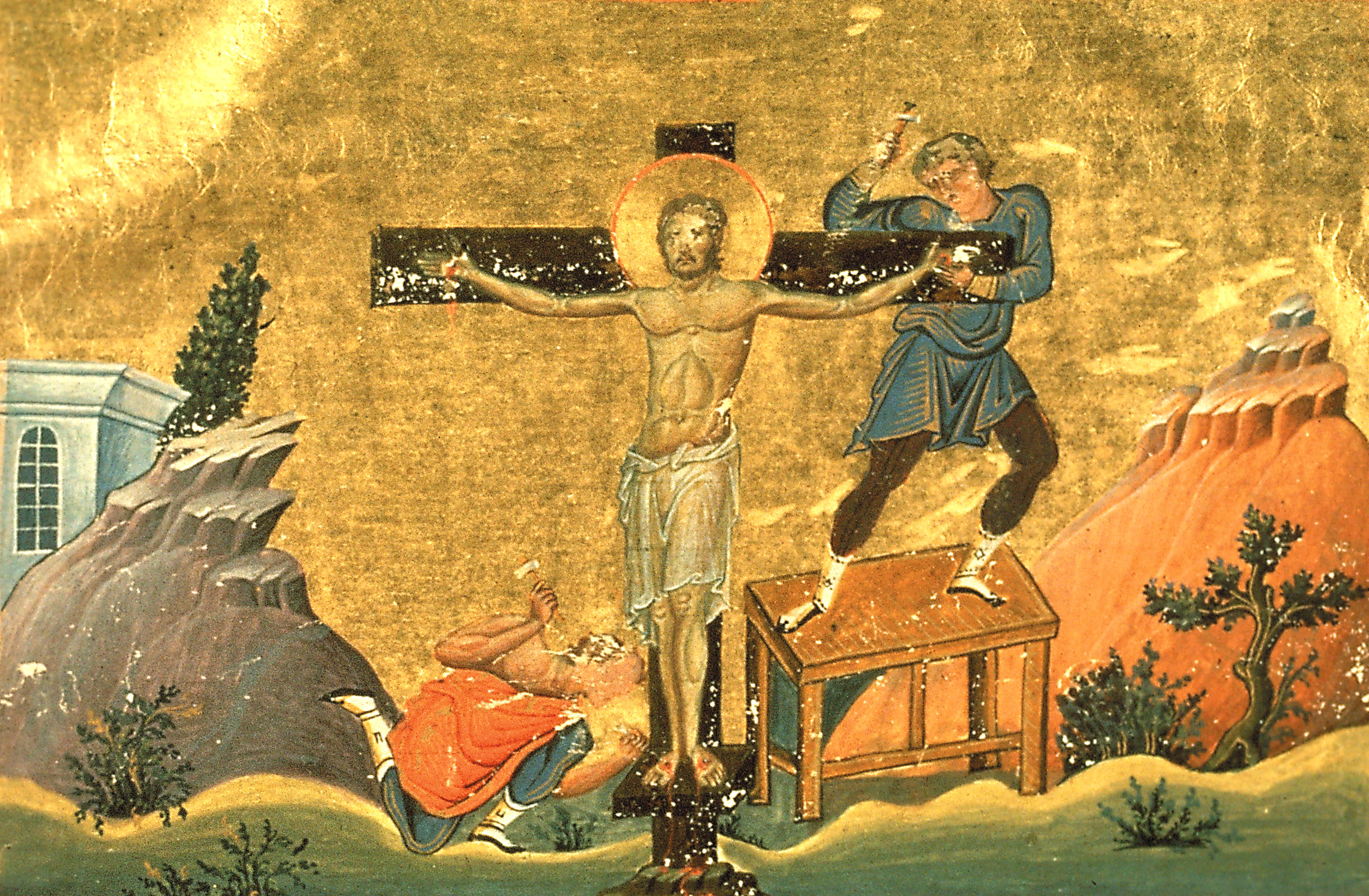
- Miniature from the Menologion of Basil II

Bishop and Martyr
- Died: 250; Perge, Pamphylia, (modern-day Aksu, Antalya, Turkey)
- Venerated in: Catholic Church, Eastern Orthodox Church
- Feast: February 25 (Roman Catholic Church); February 28 (Orthodox Churches)
- Attributes: Vested as a bishop, holding a Gospel Book, his right hand raised in blessing

Saint Nestor, also known as Saint Nestor of Perge or Hieromartyr Nestor of Magydos, was Bishop of Magydos in Pamphylia, in what is now modern Turkey.

== Background ==
Little is known about Nestor. His courage and authority were so noteworthy that a Roman magistrate uttered these words: "Until we have got the better of the bishop, we shall be powerless against the Christians." During the persecutions under Emperor Decius, Bishop Nestor was arrested while praying in his home.

He was sentenced to death by the local Roman governor, Pollio or Epolius of Lycia, after refusing to sacrifice to the pagan gods of the state. His feast day is February 25 in the Roman Catholic Church and February 28 in the Eastern Orthodox Church.
