= Arsenius Matseyevich =

Russian bishop (1697–1772)

Saint Arsenius
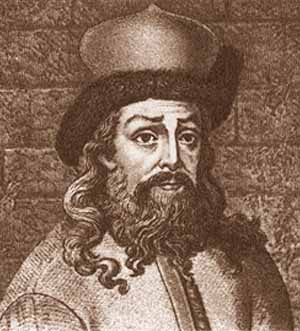
- Arseny Matseyevich

Martyr
- Born: 1697; Volodymyr
- Died: February 28, 1772 (aged 74–75); Reval
- Venerated in: Eastern Orthodox Church
- Canonized: 2000

Metropolitan Arsenius (secular name Alexander Ioannovich Matsieyevich, Russian: Алекса́ндр Иоа́ннович Мацее́вич; 1697, Volodymyr – 28 February 1772, Reval) was bishop of the Russian Orthodox Church, metropolitan of Rostov and Yaroslavl who protested against the confiscation of the church's land by Empress Catherine II in 1764. He was deprived of his office and was imprisoned in a fortress until his death.

He was canonized in 2000.
