= Saint Roderick =

Mozarab martyr and saint

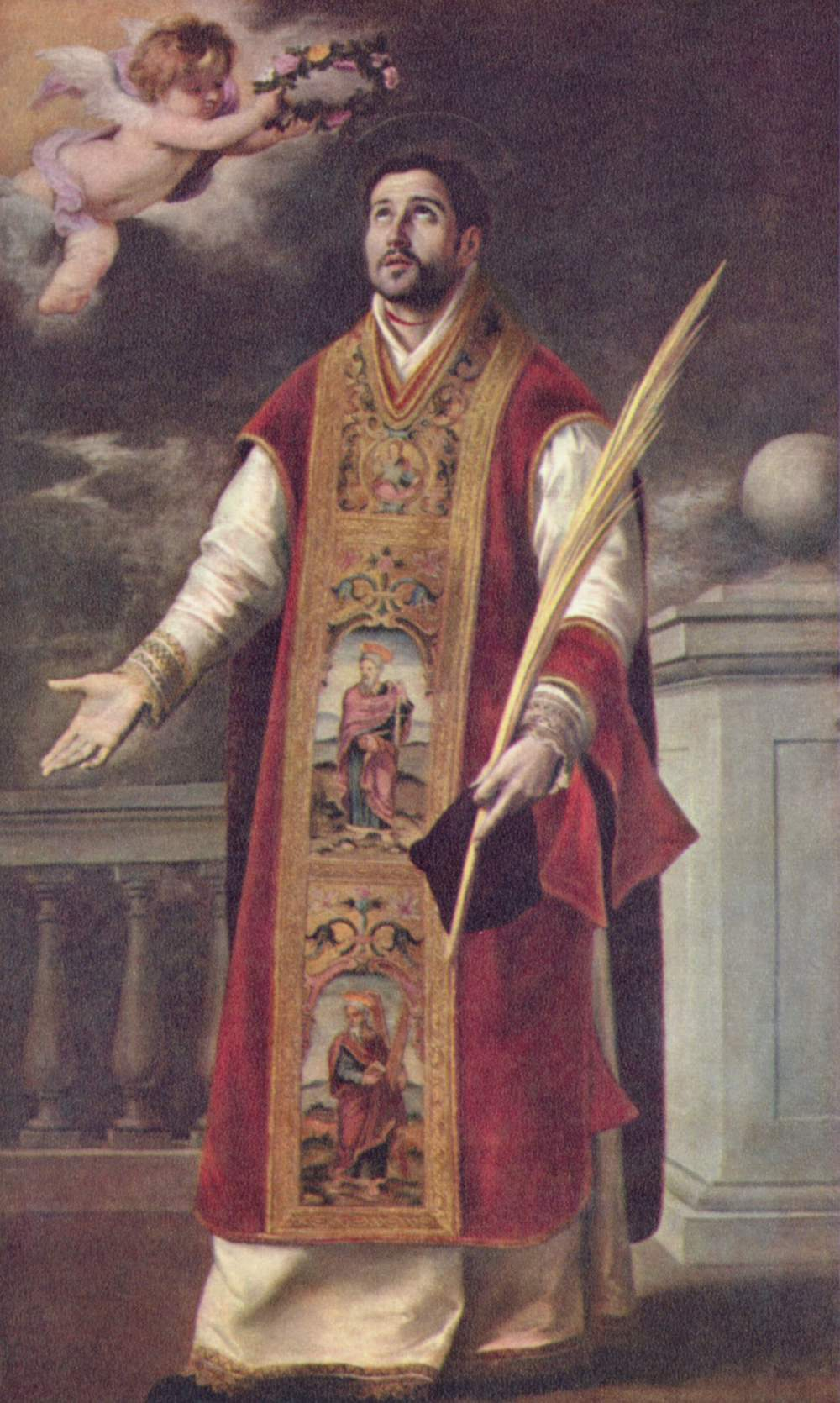
- San Rodrigo, by Bartolomé Esteban Murillo
- Died: 13 March 857; Córdoba, Al-Andalus
- Venerated in: Eastern Orthodox Church; Roman Catholic Church
- Feast: 13 March

Saint Roderick (/ˈrɒd(ə)rɪk/; Latin: Rodericus, Rudericus; Spanish: San Rodrigo; died 13 March 857) was a Christian priest of Mozarab background, venerated as one of the Martyrs of Córdoba.

Tradition states that he was a Christian priest of Cabra who had two brothers: one was a Muslim, the other irreligious. Once, after his brothers began to fight one another, Roderick attempted to break up the fight. However, they turned on him instead and beat him.

When Roderick awoke, he found that his Muslim brother had reported to the authorities that Roderick had converted to Islam. When Roderick maintained his loyalty to the Christian faith, he was accused of apostasy from Islam under Sharia law. He was imprisoned and then beheaded along with Salomon (Solomon) at Córdoba.

St. Roderick's Convent and Hospital in Cabra, established in the 16th century, bears his name.
