= Christina of Persia =

Sasanian Persian noblewoman and Christian martyr

Saint Christina of Persia
- Icon of Saint Christina of Persia

Virgin martyr
- Born: c. 6th century Sasanian Empire
- Died: Sasanian Empire
- Venerated in: Church of the East, Catholic Church, Eastern Orthodoxy, Oriental Orthodoxy
- Canonized: Pre-Congregation
- Feast: 13 March (Catholic Church, Syriac Orthodox Church); 14 March (Eastern Orthodoxy)

Christina (Syriac: ܟܪܣܛܝܢܐ, Kresṭīnā), born Yazdoi (fl. 6th century), was a Sasanian Persian noblewoman and Christian venerated after her death as a virgin martyr.

Christina was from Karka d'Beth Slokh in the region of Beth Garmai. Her father, Yazdin, son of Mihrzbiroi, was the governor of Nisibis. She converted from Zoroastrianism to the Church of the East. She was killed for refusing to consummate her marriage to a nobleman and was venerated as a virgin martyr. According to a Greek martyrology, she was beaten to death with rods. The exact date of her death is unknown, but it was probably during the reign of Khosrau I (531–579).

Not long after her death, Babai the Great (died 628) wrote her biography and martyrdom act in Syriac. Today only the preface survives. Since Babai lists all the hagiographical works he had written up to that point in his biography of George of Izla (martyred 615), he must have written Christina's biography after that date. According to Babai, she was called Yazdoi "when she was pagan", but "in her new birth of adoption as a token of life, chose to be called Christina, a name that shall not pass".

Christina is commemorated on 13 March in the Catholic Church and the Syriac Orthodox Church. The Roman Martyrology describes her as follows: "In Persia, Saint Christina, martyr, who was flogged with rods and concluded the witness of martyrdom under King Chosroes I of the Persians." In the Georgian Orthodox Church, her feast day was 15 March in the early 7th century. Some versions of the 10th-century church calendar of Ioane-Zosime, however, give it as 14 March. The Synaxarion of Constantinople of the Eastern Orthodox Church also gives 14 March.
