= Leo of Cappadocia =

Turkish Christian saint

Saint Leo of Cappadocia was a Christian saint.

Leo was an ascetic from Cappadocia whose life and martyrdom is described in John Moschos' "Pratum Spirituale" ("The Spiritual Meadow"). Leo was distinguished by his warm hospitality to all his visitors, whom he considered to be sent by God. He had the habit of saying with an enigmatic smile: "Now I am on my way to becoming an Emperor". (The word "Basileos" -"king" in Byzantium meant also "Emperor".) He was frequently derided and even considered to be out of his wits, for this saying, since there had never been an emperor from Cappadocia.

Once pagan soldiers attacked the surroundings of the town near which Leo lived. With all the inhabitants he took refuge within the walls of the town. Only a few old men were caught by the intruders. Leo left the fortress and went to the enemy camp offering himself to the pagans in the place of the old men, who because of their weakness would be of no use to them, whereas Leo had sufficient strength to be of profit. The pagans agreed, released the elders and took Leo instead. However, when Leo was loaded with sacks and asked to follow the soldiers, it turned out that Leo himself was not apt for such physical labors (even though he tried to keep his word and serve them) being weakened by his constant prayers and vigils. The pagans, believing that Leo had tricked them in order to rescue his older compatriots, were enraged and beheaded him.

Only then did the people realize that when Leo had spoken about becoming an emperor, he meant not an earthly, but a heavenly empire, for he fulfilled the commandment of the Savior: "There is no greater love than that when one lays down his soul for brethren", and therefore received the crown of the heavenly kingdom from Him.

Leo is referred to by St. John Climacus in Step 26.12 his classic work The Ladder of Divine Ascent as an exemplar of one who surpasses the commandments of the Gospel by his love.
