= March 17 (Eastern Orthodox liturgics) =

Day in the Eastern Orthodox liturgical calendar

Eastern Orthodox liturgical calendar
March 16	March 17	March 18
March 17 O.S. ≍ March 30 N.S. March 17 N.S ≍ March 4 O.S.

An Eastern Orthodox cross

March 17 in Eastern Orthodox liturgical calendars is a feast day and a day of commemoration of saints and martyrs. Although some Orthodox churches use the Revised Julian Calendar and others use the traditional Julian calendar, the fixed commemorations for their respective March 17 are broadly the same, no matter which calendar is used. (Note: Despite the dates being the same, the days to which they refer typically differ by 13 days. The notation Old Style or O.S. is sometimes used to indicate a date in the traditional Julian Calendar (the "Old Calendar"). The notation New Style or N.S. indicates a date in the Revised Julian calendar (the "New Calendar").)

== Saints ==
- Saint Lazarus the Righteous (Lazarus the Just), the friend of Christ (1st century) (Note: In the Synaxarion of Constantinople and in the Lavreotic Codex, reference is made to the "Raising of Lazarus" – the Holy and Just Lazarus, the friend of Christ. He is also commemorated on Lazarus Saturday, and on October 17 (uncovering and translation of his relics). The entry for October 17 in the Prologue from Ohrid confirms that: "Lazarus's principle feasts are on March 17 and Lazarus Saturday during Great Lent.")
- Martyr Marinus of Caesarea, soldier, at Caesarea in Palestine (262) (see also: August 7)
- Saint Ambrose, Deacon, disciple of St. Didymus the Blind of Alexandria (400)
- Venerable Alexios the Man of God, in Rome (411) (see also July 17 - West)
- Monk-martyr Paul of Cyprus, burned alive by iconoclasts (c. 760)
- Monk-martyr Paul of Crete, defender of icons, burned alive under Constantine V Copronymus (767)
- Venerable Theosterictus the Confessor, Abbot of Pelekete Monastery near Prusa (826)

== Pre-Schism Western saints ==
- Apostle Aristobulus of the Seventy, Bishop of Britain (1st century)(Ancient use, for current see also: March 15 and October 31)
- Martyrs Alexander and Theodore, early martyrs in Rome.
- Saint Ambrose of Alexandria (c. 250)
- Saint Patrick, Bishop of Armagh and the Enlightener of Ireland (461) (Note: "St. Patrick, the great enlightener of Ireland, will be officially celebrated in the Russian Orthodox Church for the first time this year on March 17/30. At its March 9 [2017] session, the Holy Synod of the Russian Orthodox, under the chairmanship of His Holiness Patriarch Kirill, officially adopted St. Patrick and more than fifteen other pre-schism Western saints into its calendar, according to the report published on the patriarchate’s official site.")
- Saint Llinio of Llandinam, Abbot and Founder of Llandinam, Powys, Wales (520)
- Saint Agricola (Agrele, Aregle), ascetic and Bishop of Châlon-sur-Saône in France (580)
- Saint Gertrude of Nivelles, Abbess of Nivelles, patroness of travellers (659)
- Saint Beccan of Rhum (677) (Note: "3. Surnamed Ruim (or Ruiminn); commemorated March 17, was the son of Ernan, and a near relative of St. Columba, and of the early abbots of Hy. Leaving Ireland, he went first to Iona, and then into a solitary place. There he lived for several years, while his uncle, Segenius, was abbot of the island. He died March 17, 677.")
- Saint Withburga, Princess of East Anglia, hermitess whose holy well is at East Dereham (c. 743) (date of repose - for main feast see also July 8)

== Post-Schism Orthodox saints ==
- Venerable Macarius, Abbot and Wonderworker of Kalyazin (1483) (Note: See also: (in Russian): Макарий Калязинский. Russian Wikipedia.)
- Venerable Hieromartyr Gabriel the Lesser, of Gareji, Georgia (1802)
- Hieromartyr Theodoulos the Sinaite (1822)
- Saint Parthenius of the Kiev Caves (1855) (Note: See also: (in Russian): Парфений Киевский. Russian Wikipedia.)
- Saint Gurias, Archbishop of Tauria and Simferopol (1882) (Note: See also: (in Russian): Гурий (Карпов). Russian Wikipedia.)

=== New martyrs and confessors ===
- New Hieromartyr Alexander Polivanov of Krasnoyarsk, Priest (1919)
- New Hieromartyr Victor Kiranov of Berdyansk, Protopresbyter of Simferopol-Crimea (1942)

== Other commemorations ==
- Commemoration of the Great Earthquake of 790 AD, under Emperor Constantine VI. (Note: As recorded in the Lavreotic Codex, the whole earth was quaking for several days. Then a great section of the Walls of Constantinople fell, churches were broken, and houses fell. The Emperor together with the Patriarch and the people made litanies before the Holy Cross and the Holy Relics and the Icons of the Saints, and prayed with tears and fasting for the mercy of God to turn away his wrath. The Lord became the hope of all, and the great earthquake ceased.)
- Repose of Lulach, last Orthodox King of Scotland (1058)
- Repose of Archbishop Tikhon (Troitsky) of San Francisco (1963) (Note: See also: (in Russian): Тихон (Троицкий). Russian Wikipedia.)

== Icon gallery ==
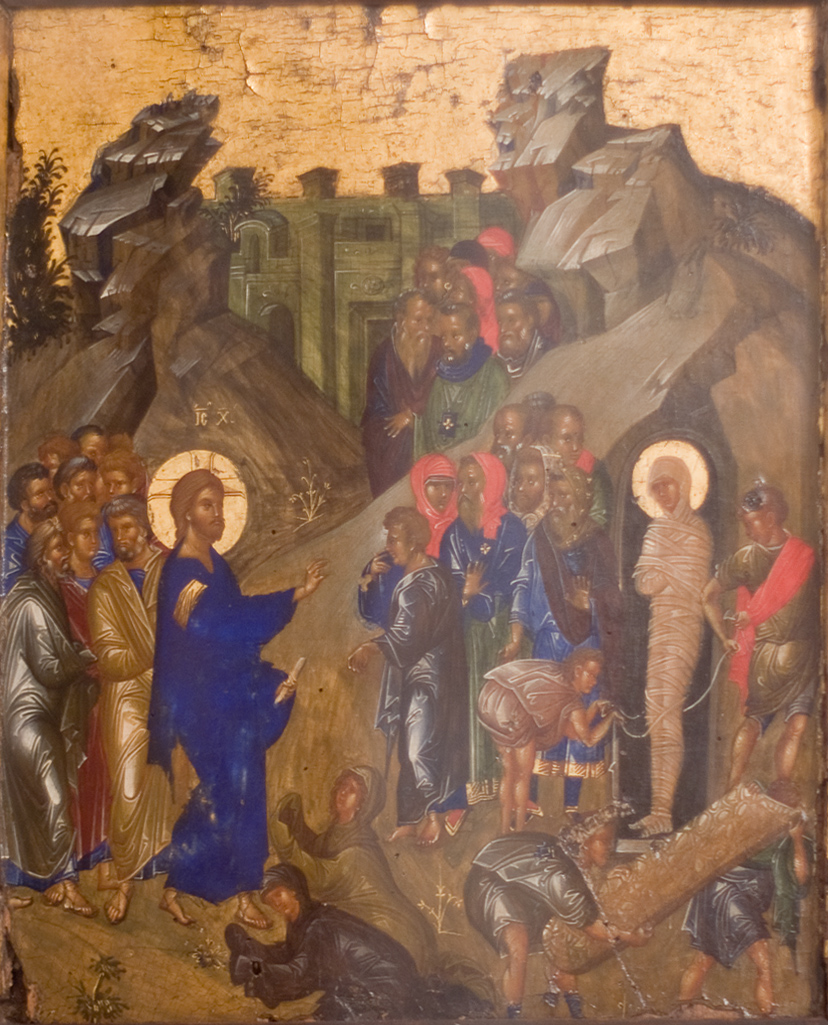
The Raising of Lazarus. Byzantine icon, 14th or 15th century

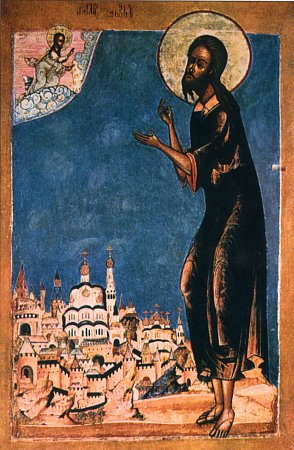
Venerable Alexis the Man of God, 17th century

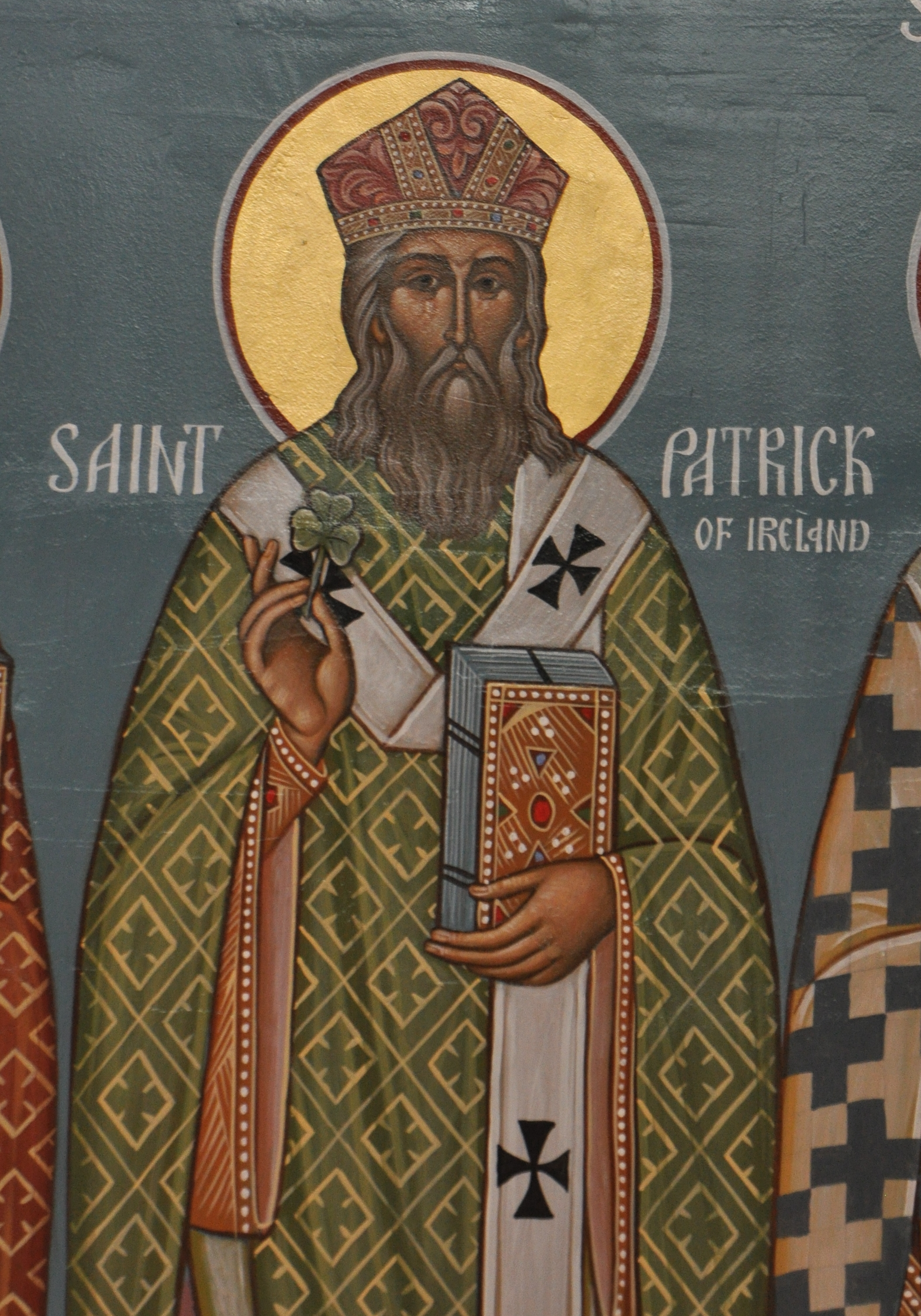
Venerable Patrick, Bishop of Armagh and the Enlightener of Ireland.

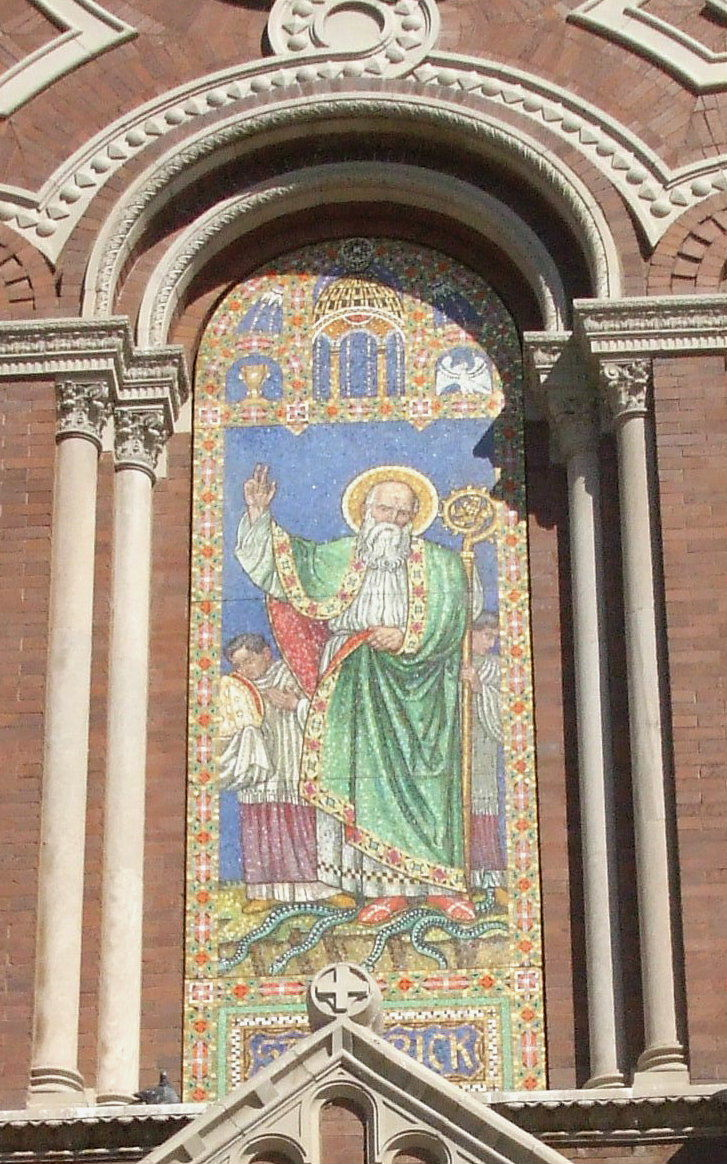
Mosaic of St Patrick casting out the snakes from Ireland.
(Cathedral Parish of Saint Patrick in El Paso)

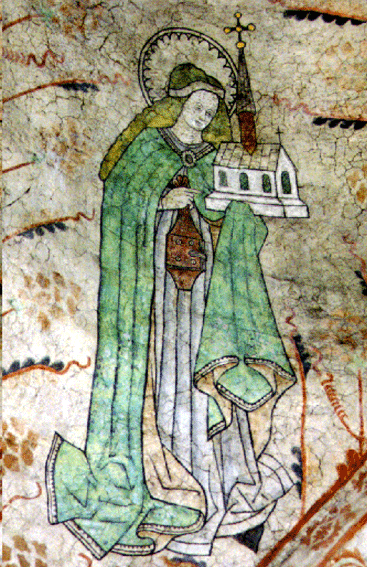
Saint Gertrude of Nivelles
(Fresco in Knivsta kyrka, Knivsta, Sweden)

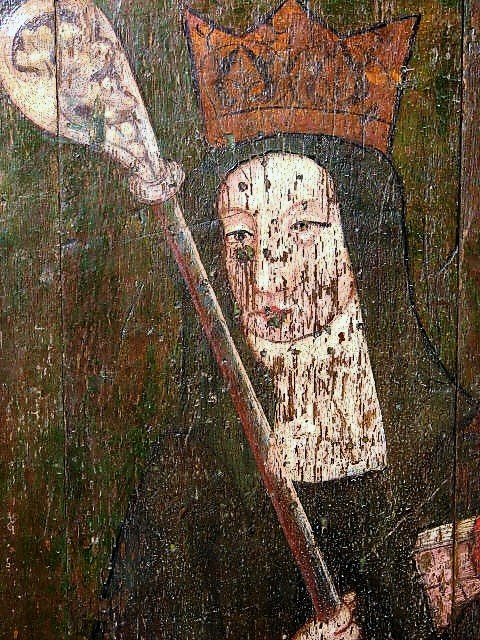
St. Withburga, depicted in a rood screen in Dereham.

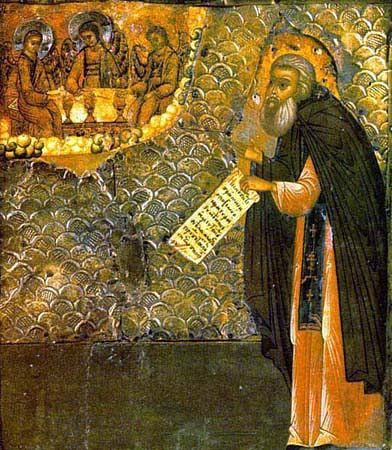
Venerable Macarius, Abbot and Wonderworker of Kalyazin, 18th century

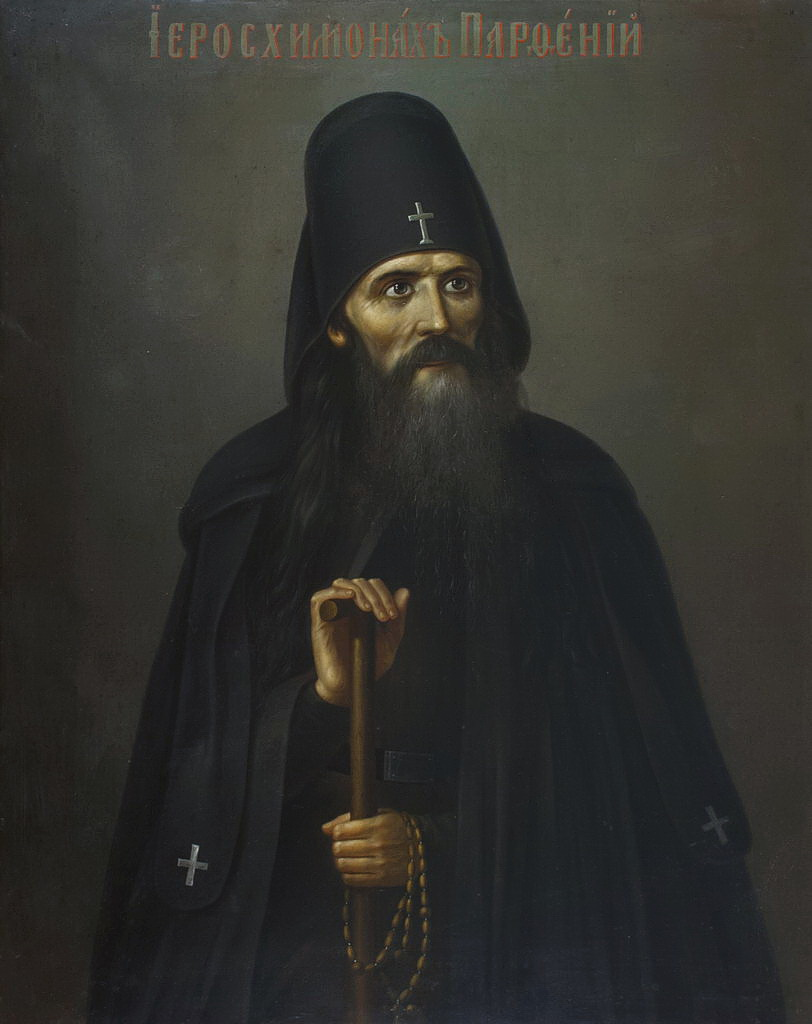
Saint Parthenius of the Kiev Caves.

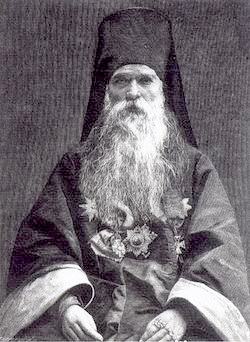
Saint Gurij Karpov, Archbishop of Tauria and Simferopol.

== Sources ==
- March 17/March 30. Orthodox Calendar (PRAVOSLAVIE.RU).
- March 30 / March 17. HOLY TRINITY RUSSIAN ORTHODOX CHURCH (A parish of the Patriarchate of Moscow).
- March 17. OCA - The Lives of the Saints.
- The Autonomous Orthodox Metropolia of Western Europe and the Americas (ROCOR). St. Hilarion Calendar of Saints for the year of our Lord 2004. St. Hilarion Press (Austin, TX). p. 22.
- March 17. Latin Saints of the Orthodox Patriarchate of Rome.
- The Roman Martyrology. Transl. by the Archbishop of Baltimore. Last Edition, According to the Copy Printed at Rome in 1914. Revised Edition, with the Imprimatur of His Eminence Cardinal Gibbons. Baltimore: John Murphy Company, 1916. pp. 15–16.

Greek Sources

- Great Synaxaristes: (in Greek) 17 ΜΑΡΤΙΟΥ. ΜΕΓΑΣ ΣΥΝΑΞΑΡΙΣΤΗΣ.
- (in Greek) Συναξαριστής. 17 Μαρτίου. ECCLESIA.GR. (H ΕΚΚΛΗΣΙΑ ΤΗΣ ΕΛΛΑΔΟΣ).

Russian Sources

- (in Russian) 30 марта (17 марта). Православная Энциклопедия под редакцией Патриарха Московского и всея Руси Кирилла (электронная версия). (Orthodox Encyclopedia - Pravenc.ru).
- (in Russian) 17 марта (ст.ст.) 30 марта 2013 (нов. ст.). Русская Православная Церковь Отдел внешних церковных связей. (DECR).
