= March 15 =

March 15 this year in various calendars
- Sunday, 15 March 2026
| Akan | Kurukwasi |
| Armenian | 28 Areg 1475 |
| Aztec | Huei Tecuilhuitl 4, 13 Malīnalli |
| Babylonian | 25 Shabatu, 2336 SE |
| Balinese pawukon | Menga, Pasah, Menala, Umanis, Paniron, Redite of Kelawu, Yama, Urungan, Pandita |
| Bengali | 1 Chaitro, BS 1432 |
| Chinese | Yang Earth Rat・Emptiness Mansion; Fire Horse Year, Month 1, Day 27 (Jingzhe, 5 days until Chunfen) |
| Common Era | 15 March 2026 CE |
| Coptic | 6 Paremhat, AM 1742 |
| Egyptian | 3 Mesori, 2774 NE |
| Ethiopian | 6 Magābit, 2018 Amätä Məhrät |
| French Republican | Décade III, Quintidi de Ventôse de l'Année 234 de la République |
| Gregorian | 15 March, AD 2026 |
| Hebrew | 26 Adar, AM 5786 |
| Hindu | Śravaṇa・Parigha; Solar: 2 Caitra, 1947 SE; Lunisolar: Adhika Ekādaśī, Kṛishna pakṣa of Phālguna, 2082 VE; Rāudra・5126 KY・1,872,649 |
| Icelandic | Sunnudagur, 22 Góa 2025 |
| Islamic | 26 Ramadan, AH 1447 (using tabular method) |
| ISO week date | 2026-W11-7 |
| Japanese | 27 Mutsuki, Reiwa 8 (Keichitsu, 5 days until Shunbun) |
| Julian | 2 March, AD 2026 (AM 7534) |
| Julian day | 2461115 |
| Korean | 27 Horangidal, 4359 DE |
| Maya | 13.0.13.7.12; 10 Cumku, 13 Eb |
| Roman | ante diem VI Nonas Martias, MMDCCLXXIX AUC |
| Solar Hijri | 24 Esfand, SH 1404 |
| Tibetan | 27 mchu, me pho rta 2153 or 1772 or 1000 |

| << | March | | | | | >> |
| Su | Mo | Tu | We | Th | Fr | Sa |
| 1 | 2 | 3 | 4 | 5 | 6 | 7 |
| 8 | 9 | 10 | 11 | 12 | 13 | 14 |
| 15 | 16 | 17 | 18 | 19 | 20 | 21 |
| 22 | 23 | 24 | 25 | 26 | 27 | 28 |
| 29 | 30 | 31 |
2026

March 15 in recent years
2026 (Sunday)
2025 (Saturday)
2024 (Friday)
2023 (Wednesday)
2022 (Tuesday)
2021 (Monday)
2020 (Sunday)
2019 (Friday)
2018 (Thursday)
2017 (Wednesday)

March 15 is the 74th day of the year (75th in leap years) in the Gregorian calendar; 291 days remain until the end of the year.

== Events ==
=== Pre-1600 ===
- 474 BC – Roman consul Aulus Manlius Vulso celebrates an ovation for concluding the war against Veii and securing a forty years' truce.
- 200 BC – The Roman Republic under its new consuls Publius Sulpicius Galba and Gaius Aurelius Cotta declares war on Philip V of Macedon, starting the Second Macedonian War.
- 44 BC – The assassination of Julius Caesar, the dictator of the Roman Republic, by a group of senators takes place on the Ides of March.
- 351 – Constantius Gallus is elevated as Caesar and then sent to Antioch to govern the Roman East.
- 493 – Odoacer, the first barbarian King of Italy after the fall of the Western Roman Empire, is slain by Theoderic the Great, king of the Ostrogoths, while the two kings were feasting together.
- 856 – Michael III, emperor of the Byzantine Empire, overthrows the regency of his mother, empress Theodora (wife of Theophilos) with support of the Byzantine nobility.
- 897 – Al-Hadi ila'l-Haqq Yahya enters Sa'dah and founds the Zaydi Imamate of Yemen.
- 933 – After a ten-year truce, German King Henry the Fowler defeats a Hungarian army at the Battle of Riade near the Unstrut river.
- 1147 – Afonso I of Portugal captures in a surprise attack the city of Santarem from the Almoravids.
- 1311 – Battle of Halmyros: The Catalan Company defeats Walter V, Count of Brienne to take control of the Duchy of Athens, a Crusader state in Greece.
- 1412 – Treaty of Lublowa: After the Peace of Thorn, Grand Master Heinrich von Plauen asks Sigismund of Hungary for economic aid. Sigismund agrees to mediate reduction to the third installment, demarcation of the Samogitian border, and other matters with a grand tournament. Hunts and lavish feasts were also organized. Sigismund invited, among others, polish king Wladyslaw Jagiello, Heinrich von Plauen and bosnian king Tvrtko II. There were people from 17 countries and languages - 40.000 nobles and 2000 knights were present from all over Europe, even England.
- 1564 – Mughal Emperor Akbar abolishes the jizya tax on non-Muslim subjects.

=== 1601–1900 ===
- 1626 – A dam failure causes the sudden flooding of the mining city of Potosí in present-day Bolivia leading to the death of thousands and the massive release of toxic mercury into the environment.
- 1672 – King Charles II of England issues the Royal Declaration of Indulgence, granting limited religious freedom to all Christians.
- 1781 – The British under Charles Cornwallis defeat American forces under Nathanael Greene in the battle of Guilford Court House.
- 1783 – In an emotional speech in Newburgh, New York, George Washington asks his officers not to support the Newburgh Conspiracy. The plea is successful, and the threatened coup d'état never takes place.
- 1820 – Maine is admitted as the twenty-third U.S. state.
- 1823 – Sailor Benjamin Morrell erroneously reports the existence of the island of New South Greenland near Antarctica.
- 1848 – A revolution breaks out in Hungary, and the Habsburg rulers are compelled to meet the demands of the reform party.
- 1874 – France and Vietnam sign the Second Treaty of Saigon, further recognizing the full sovereignty of France over Cochinchina.
- 1875 – Archbishop of New York John McCloskey is named the first cardinal in the United States.
- 1877 – First ever official cricket test match is played: Australia vs England at the MCG Stadium, in Melbourne, Australia.
- 1888 – Start of the Anglo-Tibetan War of 1888.
- 1892 – The Lobau bombing is one of the first attacks of the Ère des attentats (1892-1894).
- 1894 – Madeleine bombing by Désiré Pauwels during the Ère des attentats.

=== 1901–present ===
- 1907 – The first parliamentary elections of Finland (at the time the Grand Duchy of Finland) are held.
- 1917 – Tsar Nicholas II of Russia abdicates the Russian throne, ending the 304-year Romanov dynasty.
- 1918 – Finnish Civil War: The battle of Tampere begins.
- 1919 – Ukrainian War of Independence: The Kontrrazvedka is established as the counterintelligence division of the Revolutionary Insurgent Army of Ukraine.
- 1919 – The American Legion is founded.
- 1921 – Talaat Pasha, former Grand Vizir of the Ottoman Empire and chief architect of the Armenian genocide, is assassinated in Berlin by a 23-year-old Armenian, Soghomon Tehlirian.
- 1922 – After Egypt gains nominal independence from the United Kingdom, Fuad I becomes King of Egypt.
- 1927 – The first Women's Boat Race between the University of Oxford and the University of Cambridge takes place on The Isis in Oxford.
- 1939 – Germany occupies Czechoslovakia.
- 1939 – Carpatho-Ukraine declares itself an independent republic, but is annexed by Hungary the next day.
- 1943 – World War II: Third Battle of Kharkiv: The Germans retake the city of Kharkiv from the Soviet armies.
- 1951 – The Iranian oil industry is nationalized.
- 1961 – At the 1961 Commonwealth Prime Ministers' Conference, South Africa announces that it will withdraw from the Commonwealth when the South African Constitution of 1961 comes into effect.
- 1965 – President Lyndon B. Johnson, responding to the Selma crisis, tells the U.S. Congress "We shall overcome" while advocating the Voting Rights Act.
- 1974 – Fifteen people are killed when Sterling Airways Flight 901, a Sud Aviation Caravelle, catches fire following a landing gear collapse at Mehrabad International Airport in Tehran, Iran.
- 1978 – Somalia and Ethiopia sign a truce to end the Ethio-Somali War.
- 1986 – Collapse of Hotel New World: Thirty-three people die when the Hotel New World in Singapore collapses.
- 1990 – Mikhail Gorbachev is elected as the first and only President of the Soviet Union.
- 1991 – Cold War: The Treaty on the Final Settlement with Respect to Germany comes into effect, granting full sovereignty to the Federal Republic of Germany.
- 2008 – Stockpiles of obsolete ammunition explode at an ex-military ammunition depot in the village of Gërdec, Albania, killing 26 people.
- 2011 – Beginning of the Syrian revolution.
- 2019 – Fifty-one people are killed in the Christchurch mosque shootings, which remains the deadliest terror attack in New Zealand history.
- 2019 – Beginning of the 2019–20 Hong Kong protests.
- 2019 – Approximately 1.4 million young people in 123 countries go on strike to protest climate change.
- 2022 – The 2022 Sri Lankan protests begins amidst Sri Lanka's economic collapse.
- 2026 – Four members of a Palestinian family are shot dead in Tammun by the Israeli military.

== Births ==
=== Pre-1600 ===
- 1493 – Anne de Montmorency, French captain and diplomat (died 1567)
- 1516 – Alqas Mirza, Safavid prince (died 1550)
- 1582 – Daniel Featley, English theologian and controversialist (died 1645)
- 1591 – Alexandre de Rhodes, French missionary (died 1660)

=== 1601–1900 ===
- 1638 – Shunzhi Emperor of China (died 1661)
- 1666 – George Bähr, German architect, designed the Dresden Frauenkirche (died 1738)
- 1754 – Archibald Menzies, Scottish surgeon and botanist (died 1842)
- 1767 – Andrew Jackson, American general, judge, and politician, 7th President of the United States (died 1845)
- 1779 – William Lamb, 2nd Viscount Melbourne, English politician, Prime Minister of the United Kingdom (died 1848)
- 1787 – Adélaïde Ducluzeau, French painter
- 1790 – Ludwig Immanuel Magnus, German mathematician and academic (died 1861)
- 1791 – Charles Knight, English author and publisher (died 1873)
- 1809 – Joseph Jenkins Roberts, American-Liberian historian and politician, 1st President of Liberia (died 1876)
- 1813 – John Snow, English physician and epidemiologist (died 1858)
- 1821 – Johann Josef Loschmidt, Austrian physicist and chemist (died 1895)
- 1821 – William Milligan, Scottish theologian and author (died 1892)
- 1824 – Jules Chevalier, French priest, founded the Missionaries of the Sacred Heart (died 1907)
- 1830 – Paul Heyse, German author, poet, and playwright, Nobel Prize laureate (died 1914)
- 1830 – Élisée Reclus, French geographer and anarchist (died 1905)
- 1831 – Saint Daniele Comboni, Italian missionary and saint (died 1881)
- 1835 – Eduard Strauss, Austrian composer and conductor (died 1916)
- 1838 – Karl Davydov, Russian cellist, composer, and conductor (died 1889)
- 1851 – John Sebastian Little, American lawyer and politician, Governor of Arkansas (died 1916)
- 1845 – Hallie Quinn Brown, African-American educator, writer and activist (died 1949)
- 1851 – William Mitchell Ramsay, Scottish archaeologist and scholar (died 1939)
- 1852 – Augusta, Lady Gregory, Anglo-Irish landowner, playwright, and translator (died 1932)
- 1854 – Emil von Behring, German physiologist and physician, Nobel Prize laureate (died 1917)
- 1857 – Berta Bock, Romanian composer (died 1945)
- 1857 – Christian Michelsen, Norwegian businessman and politician, 1st Prime Minister of Norway (died 1925)
- 1858 – Liberty Hyde Bailey, American botanist and academic, co-founded the American Society for Horticultural Science (died 1954)
- 1866 – Matthew Charlton, Australian miner and politician (died 1948)
- 1868 – Grace Chisholm Young, English mathematician (died 1944)
- 1869 – Stanisław Wojciechowski, Polish scholar and politician, President of the Republic of Poland (died 1953)
- 1874 – Harold L. Ickes, American journalist and politician, United States Secretary of the Interior (died 1952)
- 1878 – Reza Shah, Iranian Shah (died 1944)
- 1879 – Benjamin R. Jacobs, American biochemist (died 1963)
- 1886 – Gerda Wegener, Danish artist (died 1940)
- 1897 – Jackson Scholz, American runner (died 1986)
- 1900 – Gilberto Freyre, Brazilian sociologist, anthropologist, historian and writer (died 1987)

=== 1901–present ===
- 1904 – George Brent, Irish-American actor (died 1979)
- 1904 – J. Pat O'Malley, English-American actor (died 1985)
- 1905 – Berthold Schenk Graf von Stauffenberg, German lawyer and judge (died 1944)
- 1907 – Zarah Leander, Swedish actress and singer (died 1981)
- 1912 – Louis Paul Boon, Flemish journalist and author (died 1979)
- 1912 – Lightnin' Hopkins, American blues singer-songwriter and guitarist (died 1982)
- 1913 – Macdonald Carey, American actor (died 1994)
- 1913 – Jack Fairman, English race car driver (died 2002)
- 1916 – Frank Coghlan, Jr., American actor and pilot (died 2009)
- 1916 – Fadil Hoxha, Kosovar commander and politician, President of Kosovo (died 2001)
- 1916 – Harry James, American trumpet player, bandleader, and actor (died 1983)
- 1918 – Richard Ellmann, American author and critic (died 1987)
- 1918 – Punch Imlach, Canadian ice hockey player, coach, and manager (died 1987)
- 1919 – Lawrence Tierney, American actor (died 2002)
- 1920 – E. Donnall Thomas, American physician and academic, Nobel Prize laureate (died 2012)
- 1921 – Madelyn Pugh, American television writer and producer (died 2011)
- 1924 – Khyber Khan, Pakistani pilot and former Deputy Chief of Air Staff of the PAF (died 2007)
- 1926 – Ben Johnston, American composer and academic (died 2019)
- 1926 – Norm Van Brocklin, American football player and coach (died 1983)
- 1927 – Christian Marquand, French actor, director, and screenwriter (died 2000)
- 1927 – Carl Smith, American singer-songwriter and guitarist (died 2010)
- 1928 – Bob Wilber, American clarinetist and saxophonist (died 2019)
- 1930 – Zhores Alferov, Belarusian-Russian physicist and academic, Nobel Prize laureate (died 2019)
- 1932 – Alan Bean, American astronaut and pilot (died 2018)
- 1932 – Arif Mardin, Turkish-American record producer (died 2006)
- 1933 – Ruth Bader Ginsburg, American lawyer and judge (died 2020)
- 1933 – Philippe de Broca, French actor, director, and screenwriter (died 2004)
- 1934 – Kanshi Ram, Indian politician (died 2006)
- 1935 – Judd Hirsch, American actor
- 1935 – Jimmy Swaggart, American pastor and television host (died 2025)
- 1936 – Howard Greenfield, American songwriter (died 1986)
- 1937 – Valentin Rasputin, Russian environmentalist and author (died 2015)
- 1939 – Ted Kaufman, American politician
- 1939 – Robert Nye, English author, poet, and playwright (died 2016)
- 1939 – Julie Tullis, English mountaineer (died 1986)
- 1940 – Frank Dobson, English politician, Secretary of State for Health (died 2019)
- 1940 – Phil Lesh, American bassist (died 2024)
- 1941 – Mike Love, American singer-songwriter and musician
- 1941 – Song Zhenzhong, child internee and revolutionary martyr (died 1949)
- 1943 – David Cronenberg, Canadian actor, director, and screenwriter
- 1943 – Lynda La Plante, English actress, screenwriter, and author
- 1943 – Michael Scott-Joynt, English bishop (died 2014)
- 1943 – Sly Stone, American musician and record producer (died 2025)
- 1944 – Chi Cheng, Taiwanese runner
- 1944 – Jacques Doillon, French director and screenwriter
- 1944 – Francis Mankiewicz, Canadian director, producer, and screenwriter (died 1993)
- 1946 – Bobby Bonds, American baseball player and coach (died 2003)
- 1946 – John Dempsey, English-Irish footballer and manager (died 2024)
- 1947 – Ry Cooder, American singer-songwriter and guitarist
- 1948 – Kate Bornstein, American author and activist
- 1948 – Sérgio Vieira de Mello, Brazilian diplomat (died 2003)
- 1951 – David Alton, Baron Alton of Liverpool, English politician
- 1953 – Frances Conroy, American actress
- 1954 – Isobel Buchanan, Scottish soprano and actress
- 1954 – Henry Marsh, American runner and businessman
- 1954 – Craig Wasson, American actor
- 1955 – Mickey Hatcher, American baseball player and coach
- 1955 – Mohsin Khan, Pakistani cricketer
- 1955 – Dee Snider, American singer-songwriter
- 1957 – Joaquim de Almeida, Portuguese-American actor
- 1957 – Park Overall, American actress and activist
- 1957 – Steve Witkoff, American real estate investor, former lawyer, and diplomat
- 1959 – Harold Baines, American baseball player
- 1959 – Renny Harlin, Finnish director and producer
- 1959 – Fabio Lanzoni, Italian-American model and actor
- 1959 – Ben Okri, Nigerian poet and author
- 1959 – Eliot Teltscher, American tennis player
- 1960 – Mike Pagliarulo, American baseball player
- 1961 – Terry Cummings, American basketball player
- 1962 – Terence Trent D'Arby, American singer-songwriter
- 1963 – Bret Michaels, American singer-songwriter, musician, and television personality
- 1964 – Rockwell, American singer-songwriter and musician
- 1964 – Marco Van Hees, Belgian politician
- 1965 – Sunetra Gupta, Indian epidemiologist, author, and academic
- 1966 – Chris Bruno, American actor
- 1967 – Naoko Takeuchi, Japanese manga artist and creator of Sailor Moon
- 1968 – Kahimi Karie, Japanese singer
- 1968 – Mark McGrath, American singer-songwriter
- 1968 – Sabrina Salerno, Italian singer-songwriter
- 1969 – Gianluca Festa, Italian footballer
- 1969 – Kim Raver, American actress
- 1969 – Yutaka Take, Japanese jockey
- 1969 – Timo Kotipelto, Finnish musician and lead singer of the power metal band Stratovarius
- 1970 – Derek Parra, American speed skater
- 1971 – Joanne Wise, English long jumper
- 1972 – Mark Hoppus, American singer-songwriter and musician
- 1972 – Holger Stromberg, German chef
- 1972 – Mike Tomlin, American football player and coach
- 1974 – Robert Fick, American baseball player
- 1975 – Eva Longoria, American actress
- 1975 – Darcy Tucker, Canadian ice hockey player
- 1975 – will.i.am, American rapper, producer, and actor
- 1976 – Cara Pifko, Canadian actress
- 1977 – Joe Hahn, American musician, DJ, director, and visual artist
- 1977 – Brian Tee, Japanese-American actor
- 1977 – Sandeep Unnikrishnan, Indian military officer (died 2008)
- 1978 – Takeru Kobayashi, Japanese competitive eater
- 1979 – Kyle Mills, New Zealand cricketer
- 1979 – Kevin Youkilis, American baseball player
- 1980 – Freddie Bynum, American baseball player
- 1981 – Young Buck, American rapper
- 1981 – Mikael Forssell, German-Finnish footballer
- 1981 – Jens Salumäe, Estonian skier
- 1982 – Wilson Kipsang Kiprotich, Kenyan runner
- 1983 – Umut Bulut, Turkish footballer
- 1983 – Ben Hilfenhaus, Australian cricketer
- 1983 – Kostas Kaimakoglou, Greek basketball player
- 1983 – Golda Marcus, Salvadoran swimmer
- 1983 – Daryl Murphy, Irish footballer
- 1983 – Yo Yo Honey Singh, Indian rapper, producer, and actor
- 1984 – Badradine Belloumou, French-Algerian footballer
- 1984 – Olivier Jean, Canadian speed skater
- 1984 – Kostas Vasileiadis, Greek basketball player
- 1985 – Eva Amurri, American actress
- 1985 – Jon Jay, American baseball player and coach
- 1985 – Kellan Lutz, American actor and model
- 1986 – Jai Courtney, Australian actor
- 1986 – Jannik Hansen, Danish ice hockey player
- 1987 – Eric Decker, American football player
- 1988 – Lil Dicky, American rapper, comedian, and actor
- 1988 – Éver Guzmán, Mexican footballer
- 1988 – James Reimer, Canadian ice hockey player
- 1989 – Sam Baldock, English footballer
- 1989 – Gil Roberts, American sprinter
- 1989 – Sandro, Brazilian footballer
- 1989 – Adrien Silva, Portuguese footballer
- 1989 – Caitlin Wachs, American actress
- 1990 – Nick Ahmed, American baseball player
- 1990 – Tavon Austin, American football player
- 1990 – JD McDonagh, Irish professional wrestler
- 1991 – Xavier Henry, American basketball player
- 1991 – Trayce Thompson, American baseball player
- 1992 – Devonta Freeman, American football player
- 1993 – Alia Bhatt, British actress
- 1993 – Michael Fulmer, American baseball player
- 1993 – Taylor Heinicke, American football player
- 1993 – Aleksandra Krunić, Serbian tennis player
- 1993 – Paul Pogba, French footballer
- 1993 – Mark Scheifele, Canadian ice hockey player
- 1994 – Matt Gay, American football player
- 1994 – Scott Seiss, American comedian
- 1995 – Jabari Parker, American basketball player
- 1996 – Maxwell Jacob Friedman, American professional wrestler
- 1996 – Seonaid McIntosh, Scottish sports shooter
- 1996 – Jinjin, South Korean singer and actor
- 2000 – Kristian Kostov, Russian-Bulgarian singer-songwriter
- 2001 – Ellie Leach, English actress
- 2003 – Quinn Ewers, American football player
- 2004 – Isaiah Bond, American football player
- 2005 – Rodri Mendoza, Spanish footballer

== Deaths ==
=== Pre-1600 ===
- 44 BC – Julius Caesar, Roman general and statesman (born 100 BC)
- 220 – Cao Cao, Chinese general, warlord and statesman
- 493 – Odoacer, first king of Italy after the fall of the Western Roman Empire (born 433)
- 963 – Romanos II, Byzantine emperor
- 990 – Siegfried I (the Older), German nobleman
- 1124 – Ernulf, Bishop of Rochester
- 1190 – Isabella of Hainault, queen of Philip II of France (born 1170)
- 1311 – Walter V, Count of Brienne
- 1536 – Pargalı Ibrahim Pasha, Ottoman politician, Grand Vizier of the Ottoman Empire (born 1493)
- 1575 – Annibale Padovano, Italian organist and composer (born 1527)

=== 1601–1900 ===
- 1673 – Salvator Rosa, Italian painter and poet (born 1615)
- 1711 – Eusebio Kino, Italian priest and missionary (born 1645)
- 1820 – Clement Mary Hofbauer, Austrian priest and saint (born 1751)
- 1842 – Luigi Cherubini, Italian composer and theorist (born 1760)
- 1848 – Johan Jakob Nervander, Finnish poet, physicist and meteorologist (born 1805)
- 1891 – Joseph Bazalgette, English engineer and academic (born 1819)
- 1897 – James Joseph Sylvester, English mathematician and academic (born 1814)
- 1898 – Henry Bessemer, English engineer and businessman (born 1813)

=== 1901–present ===
- 1921 – Talaat Pasha, Ottoman politician, Grand Vizier of the Ottoman Empire (born 1874)
- 1925 – Sam Dreben, American soldier and mercenary (born 1878)
- 1927 – Hector Rason, English-Australian politician, 7th Premier of Western Australia (born 1858)
- 1937 – H. P. Lovecraft, American short story writer, editor, and novelist (born 1890)
- 1941 – Alexej von Jawlensky, Russian-German painter (born 1864)
- 1942 – Rachel Field, American author and poet (born 1894)
- 1948 – Imanuel Lauster, German engineer (born 1873)
- 1959 – Lester Young, American saxophonist and clarinet player (born 1909)
- 1962 – Arthur Compton, American physicist and academic, Nobel Prize laureate (born 1892)
- 1966 – Abe Saperstein, American basketball player and coach (born 1902)
- 1969 – Miles Malleson, English actor and screenwriter (born 1888)
- 1970 – Tarjei Vesaas, Norwegian author and poet (born 1897)
- 1975 – Aristotle Onassis, Greek-Argentinian businessman (born 1906)
- 1977 – Hubert Aquin, Canadian author and activist (born 1929)
- 1977 – Antonino Rocca, Italian-American wrestler and referee (born 1921)
- 1981 – René Clair, French director and screenwriter (born 1898)
- 1981 – Philip Testa, Italian-American mobster (born 1924)
- 1983 – Rebecca West, English author and critic (born 1892)
- 1985 – Alan A. Freeman, English record producer (born 1920)
- 1988 – Dmitri Polyakov, Ukrainian general and spy (born 1921)
- 1990 – Farzad Bazoft, Iranian-English journalist (born 1958)
- 1990 – Tom Harmon, American football player and sportscaster (born 1919)
- 1991 – Bud Freeman, American saxophonist, composer, and bandleader (born 1906)
- 1997 – Gail Davis, American actress (born 1925)
- 1997 – Victor Vasarely, Hungarian-French painter (born 1906)
- 1998 – Benjamin Spock, American pediatrician and author (born 1903)
- 2001 – Ann Sothern, American actress and singer (born 1909)
- 2003 – Thora Hird, English actress (born 1911)
- 2003 – Paul Stojanovich, American television producer, created World's Wildest Police Videos (born 1955)
- 2004 – Philippe Lemaire, French actor (born 1927)
- 2004 – Bill Pickering, New Zealand-American scientist and engineer (born 1910)
- 2004 – John Pople, English-American chemist and academic, Nobel Prize laureate (born 1925)
- 2005 – Otar Korkia, Georgian basketball player (born 1923)
- 2006 – Georgios Rallis, Greek lieutenant and politician, Prime Minister of Greece (born 1918)
- 2006 – Red Storey, Canadian football player and referee (born 1918)
- 2007 – Charles Harrelson, American murderer (born 1938)
- 2007 – Stuart Rosenberg, American director and producer (born 1927)
- 2008 – Mikey Dread, Jamaican singer-songwriter and producer (born 1954)
- 2008 – G. David Low, American astronaut and engineer (born 1956)
- 2008 – Sarla Thakral, First Indian woman to earn a pilot's license. (born 1914)
- 2009 – Ron Silver, American actor, director, and producer (born 1946)
- 2010 – Kazim al-Samawi, Iraqi poet (born 1925)
- 2011 – Nate Dogg, American rapper (born 1969)
- 2011 – Smiley Culture, English singer and DJ (born 1963)
- 2012 – Mervyn Davies, Welsh rugby player (born 1946)
- 2012 – Dave Philley, American baseball player and manager (born 1920)
- 2013 – Booth Gardner, American businessman and politician, Governor of Washington (born 1936)
- 2013 – Terry Lightfoot, English clarinet player (born 1935)
- 2013 – Leverne McDonnell, Australian actress (born 1963)
- 2013 – Peter Worsley, English sociologist (born 1924)
- 2014 – Scott Asheton, American drummer (born 1949)
- 2014 – David Brenner, American comedian, actor, and author (born 1936)
- 2014 – Bo Callaway, American soldier and politician, United States Secretary of the Army (born 1927)
- 2014 – Clarissa Dickson Wright, English chef, author, and television personality (born 1947)
- 2015 – Collins Chabane, South African politician (born 1960)
- 2015 – Robert Clatworthy, English sculptor and educator (born 1928)
- 2015 – Sally Forrest, American actress and dancer (born 1928)
- 2015 – Curtis Gans, American political scientist and author (born 1937)
- 2015 – Mike Porcaro, American bass player (born 1955)
- 2016 – Sylvia Anderson, English voice actress and television and film producer (born 1927)
- 2016 – Asa Briggs, English historian and academic (born 1921)
- 2016 – Seru Rabeni, Fijian rugby player (born 1978)
- 2019 – Larry DiTillio, American film and TV series writer (born 1948)
- 2020 – Vittorio Gregotti, Italian architect (born 1927)
- 2022 – Barbara Maier Gustern, American vocal coach and singer (born 1935)
- 2025 – Wings Hauser, American actor (born 1947)
- 2025 – Nita Lowey, American politician (born 1937)
- 2025 – Rajnikumar Pandya, Indian writer (born 1938)

== Holidays and observances ==
- Ancient Roman religious observance:
  - Ides of March
- Christian feast day:
  - Aristobulus of Britannia (Roman Catholic Church)
  - Artémides Zatti
  - Clement Mary Hofbauer
  - Leocritia
  - Saint Longinus
  - Louise de Marillac
  - Blessed William Hart
  - March 15 (Eastern Orthodox liturgics)
- Constitution Day (Belarus)
- International Day To Combat Islamophobia
- Joseph Jenkins Roberts' Birthday (Liberia)
- National Day, celebrating the Hungarian Revolution of 1848 (Hungary)
- World Consumer Rights Day (International)
- Youth Day (Palau)

== Notes ==
- Wilson, Scott (19 August 2016). Resting Places: The Burial Sites of More Than 14,000 Famous Persons, 3d ed. McFarland. ISBN 978-1-4766-2599-7.
