= March 16 (Eastern Orthodox liturgics) =

Day in the Eastern Orthodox liturgical calendar

Eastern Orthodox liturgical calendar
March 15	March 16	March 17
March 16 O.S. ≍ March 29 N.S. March 16 N.S ≍ March 3 O.S.

An Eastern Orthodox cross

March 16 in Eastern Orthodox liturgical calendars is a feast day and a day of commemoration of saints and martyrs. Although some Orthodox churches use the Revised Julian Calendar and others use the traditional Julian calendar, the fixed commemorations for their respective March 16 are broadly the same, no matter which calendar is used. (Note: Despite the dates being the same, the days to which they refer typically differ by 13 days. The notation Old Style or O.S. is sometimes used to indicate a date in the traditional Julian Calendar (the "Old Calendar"). The notation New Style or N.S. indicates a date in the Revised Julian calendar (the "New Calendar").)

== Saints ==
- Apostle Aristobulus of the Seventy, Bishop of Britain (1st century) (Russian use only, for universal usage see also: March 15 and October 31)
- Hieromartyr Alexander I, Pope of Rome (c. 115)
- Hieromartyrs Eventius and Theodoulus, Presbyters of the Church of Rome, martyred alongside Pope Alexander of Rome (c. 117-138)
- Holy Ten Martyrs of Phoenicia, by the sword.
- Martyr Sabinus of Hermopolis, Egypt (287) (Note: "The Holy Martyr Sabinus was administrator of the Egyptian city of Hermopolis. During a persecution of Christians under the emperor Diocletian (284-305), St Sabinus and some like-minded companions hid in a remote village. His hiding place was revealed by a certain ungrateful beggar who had brought him food. The saint used to feed him and help him with money, but the man betrayed him for two pieces of gold. Sabinus was seized with six other Christians, and after torture they were all drowned in the Nile in 287.")
- Hieromartyrs Trophimus and Thalus, Priests of Laodicea (300)
- Martyr Papas of Lycaonia (305) (Note: "The Holy Martyr Papas lived in the city of Laranda (Asia Minor) during the reign of Maximian (305-311). They arrested and tortured him for his belief in Christ. His feet were put into boots with sharp nails hammered into the soles, and made to walk. They took him to the city of Diocaesarea and later to Seleucia, Isauria to stand trial. St Papas died bound to a barren tree, which then became fruitful.") (see also: September 14)
- Martyr Julian of Anazarbus, in Cilicia (305) (Note: "The Hieromartyr Julian of Anazauria suffered for Christ in Antioch, Syria under the emperor Maximian Galerius (305-311). His relics were glorified by miracles in the time of St John Chrysostom. Chrysostom mentions the martyr in his 47th homily.")
- Venerable Aninas of Mesopotamia the Wonderworker. (see also: March 18)
- Hieromartyr Romanos, at Parium on the Hellespont. (Note: The Holy Hieromartyr Romanos was a Deacon in the Church of Palestine, in Caesarea, who taught people the faith in Christ. For this reason he was captured and severely tortured, and was martyred by the sword.)

== Pre-Schism Western saints ==
- Martyrs Hilary of Aquileia and Tatian the Deacon, with Felix, Largus and Denis, under Numerian (c. 284) (Note: Hilary was Bishop of Aquileia, Tatian his deacon, and the others laymen. All were beheaded under Numerian.) (Note: "At Aquileia, in the time of the emperor Numerian and the governor Beronius, the birthday of the holy bishop Hilary, and the deacon Tatian, who terminated their martyrdom with Felix, Largus, and Denis, after being subjected to the rack and other tortures.")
- Saint Agapitus, Bishop of Ravenna (4th century)
- Saint Finian Lobhar, Abbot of Swords Abbey near Dublin (c. 560)
- Saint Abbán of Kilabban, Ireland (650)
- Saint Eusebia, Abbess at Hamay-les-Marchiennes near Arras, France (c. 680) (Note: Eldest daughter of Sts Adalbald and Rictrudis, she became a nun at Hamage or Hamay in Belgium, a convent which had been founded by her grandmother St Gertrude and where she later became abbess.) (Note: See: Eusébie (sainte). Wikipédia (French Wikipedia).)
- Saint Dentlin (Dentelin, Denain), child-saint, considered a confessor of the faith (7th century) (Note: The son of St Vincent Madelgarus and St Waldetrudis. He was only seven years old when he reposed, confessing the Faith.)
- Venerable John of Rufiana, ascetic of the Monasterium Rufianense (San Pedro de Montes), near Astorga, Spain.
- Saint Megingold von Rothenburg (Megingaud, Mengold, Megingoz), Bishop of Würzburg (794)
- Saint Gregory Makar, a monk who was elected Bishop of Nicopolis in Armenia, then fled to France and settled as a hermit in Pithiviers near Orleans (c. 1000)
- Saint Heribert of Cologne, Archbishop of Cologne (1021) (Note: Born in Worms in Germany and a monk at Gorze in France, he became Archbishop of Cologne. He was an outstanding churchman, learned, zealous and enterprising. He built the monastery of Deutz on the Rhine, where he was buried.)

== Post-Schism Orthodox saints ==
- Venerable Christodoulos, Wonderworker of Patmos (1093)
- Venerable Pimen of Salosi, Fool-for-Christ, Enlightener of the Dagestani (North Caucasus people), and his companion Anthony of Meskhi, Georgia, the Censurer of Kings (13th century)
- New Monk-martyr Malachi of Rhodes, who suffered at Jerusalem (1500)
- Saint Serapion of Novgorod, Archbishop of Novgorod (1516)
- Saint Ambrose (Khelaia) the Confessor, Catholicos-Patriarch of All Georgia (1927) (see also: March 27)
- Venerable Eutropia (Isayenkova) of Kherson, clairvoyant (1968) (Note: The uncovering of the relics in 2009 is celebrated on October 30.) (Note: On 9 August 2011 the Ukrainian Orthodox Church glorified a local Saint, the Venerable Eutropia Isayenkova of Kherson in Crimea. Little is known of St. Eutropia's childhood, but she was native to the Kherson region and born on 24 November 1863 to her parents Leontius and Agatha. Because she was born on the feast of St. Katherine, this was her name before becoming a monastic. At the age of twelve she was sent to nearby Aleshkovskii Monastery. Together with her education, it was here that she learned to love prayer and sacred studies. Eventually she dedicated her life to the Monastery and took the name of Eutropia, inspired by St. Eutropia of Alexandria (Oct. 30). Her monastic obedience was singing in the choir and reading. To others, she was known for her kindness and modesty. Many people would visit Eutropia and she eventually became renowned for her clairvoyance and commitment to praying for the dead who had no one to serve funerals or memorials for them due to the Soviets' closure of churches. God would reveal to her the names of the reposed in order for her to pray for them. A blank piece of paper near her bed at night was full of names by the morning for her to pray for. Many would visit her, even from great distances, so that the yard of her house seemed to always be full. Spiritual children testify that she wore fetters on her feet and in her hands was always a Bible which she studied. Though she received many gifts from the people, she only lived on unleavened bread and holy water, and everything else she gave to those in need. As she was near death her spiritual children would ask to whom they should now go to for their needs; Eutropia responded that they were to come to her grave as if she were among the living. When she reposed on 29 March 1968 she was 105 years old. The funeral took place in the Church of the Nativity of the Theotokos with thousands in attendance. She was buried in the cemetery Kindiyskom. At her grave many received her grace-filled help and healing. The Saint's relics now rest in Kherson's Cathedral of the Holy Spirit.)

== Icon gallery ==
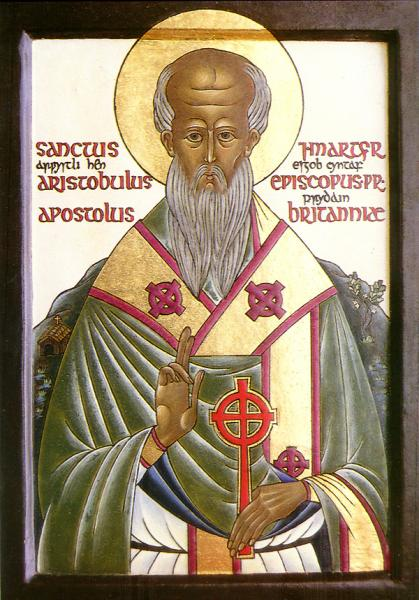
Apostle Aristobulus of the Seventy, Bishop of Britain.

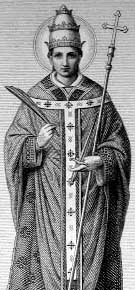
Hieromartyr Alexander I, Pope of Rome.

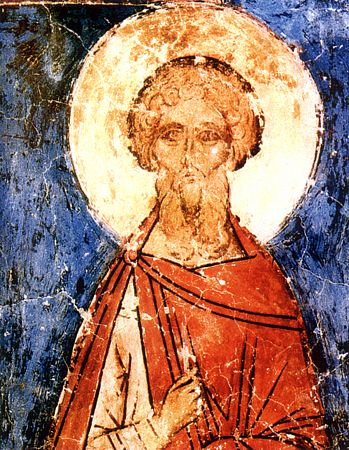
Martyr Julian of Anazarbus, in Cilicia.

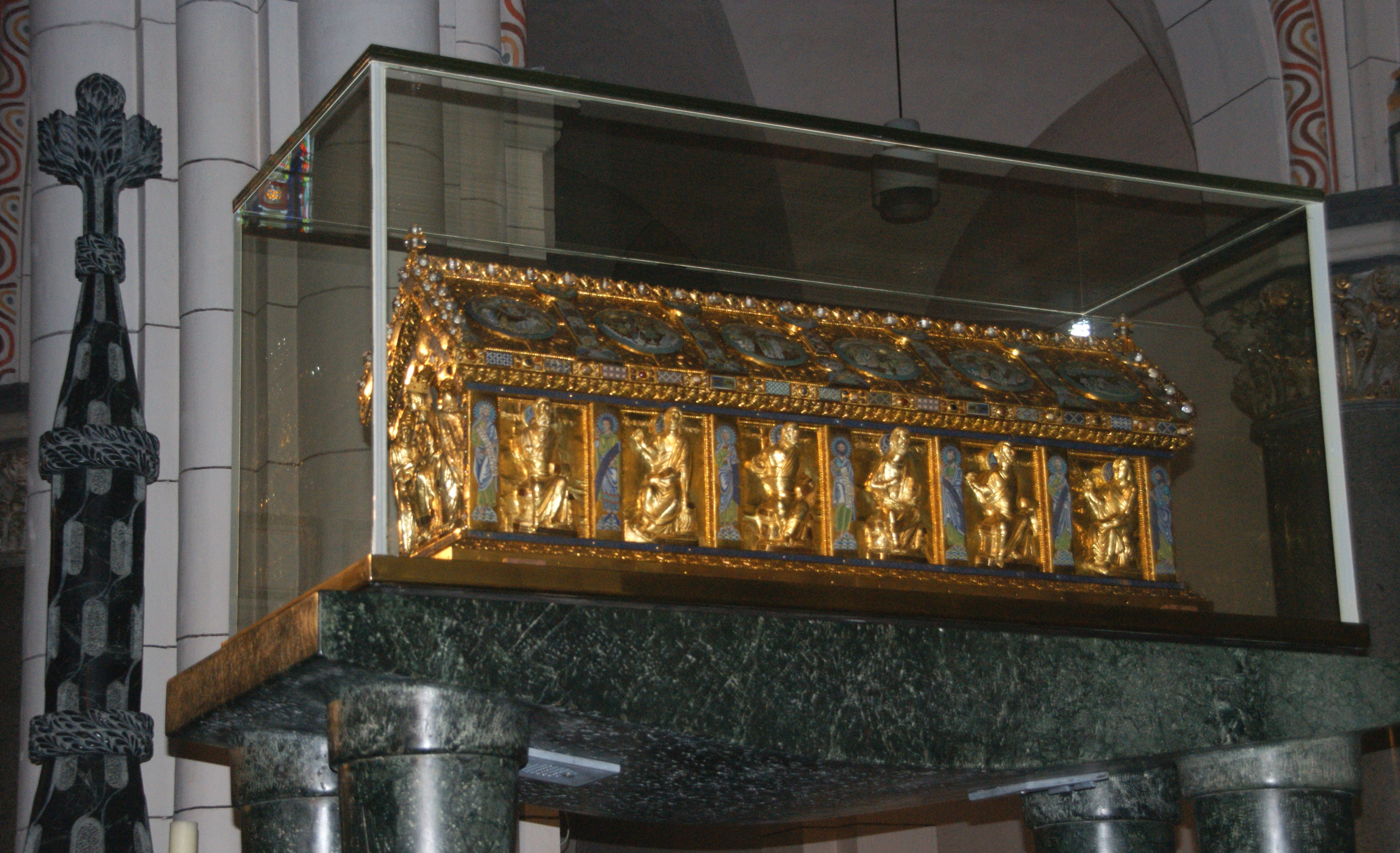
Shrine of St Heribert of Cologne, Archbishop of Cologne.

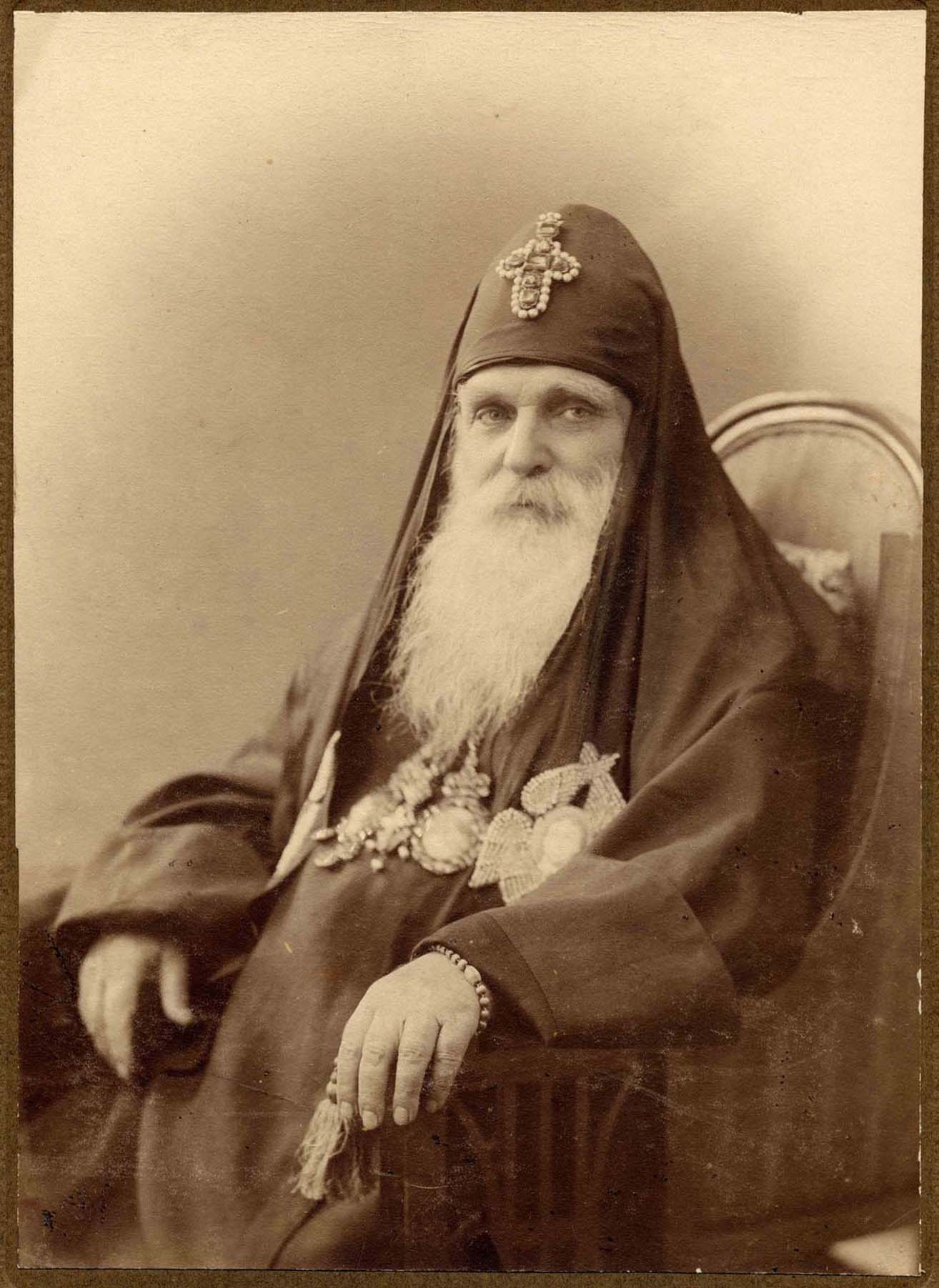
Ambrosius, Catholicos-Patriarch of All Georgia.

== Sources ==
- March 16/March 29. Orthodox Calendar (PRAVOSLAVIE.RU).
- March 29 / March 16. HOLY TRINITY RUSSIAN ORTHODOX CHURCH (A parish of the Patriarchate of Moscow).
- Complete List of Saints. Protection of the Mother of God Church (POMOG).
- March 16. OCA - The Lives of the Saints.
- The Autonomous Orthodox Metropolia of Western Europe and the Americas (ROCOR). St. Hilarion Calendar of Saints for the year of our Lord 2004. St. Hilarion Press (Austin, TX). p. 22.
- March 16. Latin Saints of the Orthodox Patriarchate of Rome.
- The Roman Martyrology. Transl. by the Archbishop of Baltimore. Last Edition, According to the Copy Printed at Rome in 1914. Revised Edition, with the Imprimatur of His Eminence Cardinal Gibbons. Baltimore: John Murphy Company, 1916. pp. 77–78.

Greek Sources

- Great Synaxaristes: (in Greek) 16 ΜΑΡΤΙΟΥ. ΜΕΓΑΣ ΣΥΝΑΞΑΡΙΣΤΗΣ.
- (in Greek) Συναξαριστής. 16 Μαρτίου. ECCLESIA.GR. (H ΕΚΚΛΗΣΙΑ ΤΗΣ ΕΛΛΑΔΟΣ).

Russian Sources

- (in Russian) 29 марта (16 марта). Православная Энциклопедия под редакцией Патриарха Московского и всея Руси Кирилла (электронная версия). (Orthodox Encyclopedia - Pravenc.ru).
- (in Russian) 16 марта (ст.ст.) 29 марта 2013 (нов. ст.). Русская Православная Церковь Отдел внешних церковных связей. (DECR).
