= Hilarion the Younger =

Byzantine monk

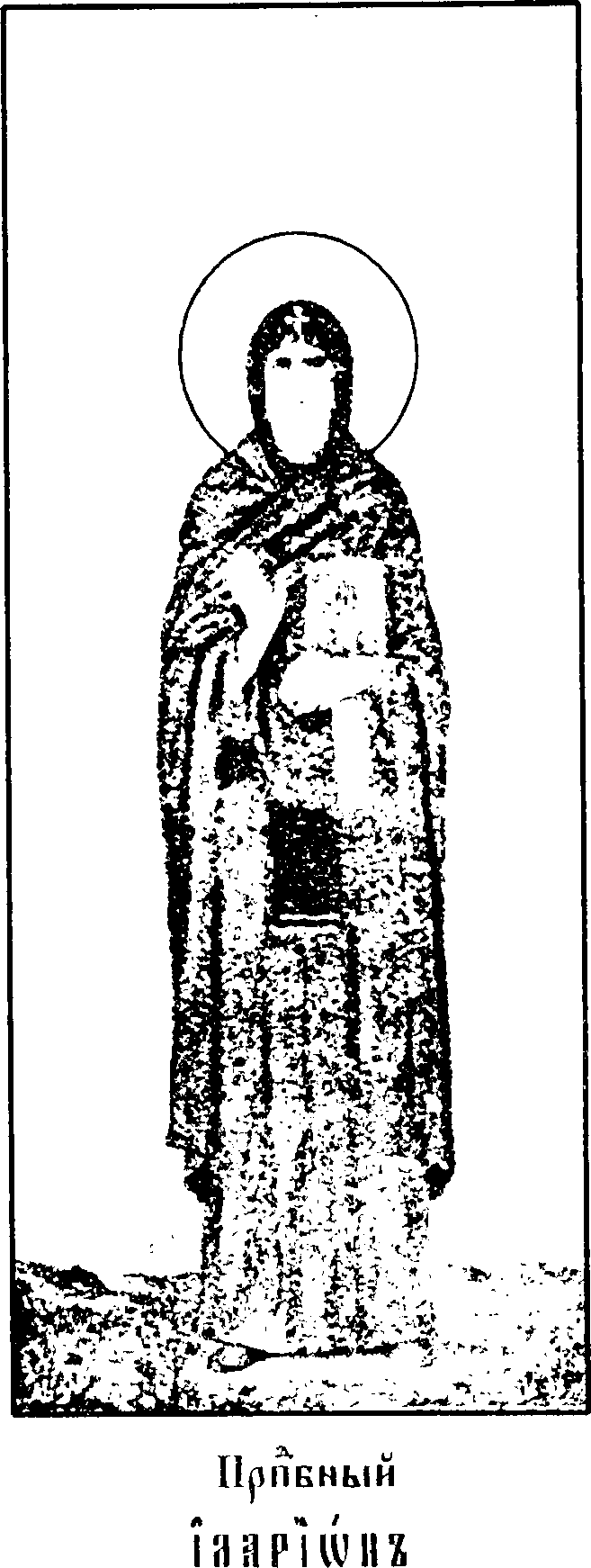

Hilarion the Younger (Greek: Ἱλαρίων ὁ νέος) was an abbot of the Pelekete Monastery in Bithynia, and a saint of the Eastern Orthodox Church.

He lived in the late 8th or early 9th century, and was an opponent of Byzantine Iconoclasm. Miracles were attributed to his tomb, and he is venerated by the Eastern Orthodox Church on 27 or 28 March. It has been suggested that he might be the anonymous abbot of Pelekete who died in 823, but the latter entertained a more moderate position against the iconoclasts, and was prepared to make concessions to them.

== Sources ==
- Lilie, Ralph-Johannes; Ludwig, Claudia; Pratsch, Thomas; Zielke, Beate (2013). Prosopographie der mittelbyzantinischen Zeit Online. Berlin-Brandenburgische Akademie der Wissenschaften. Nach Vorarbeiten F. Winkelmanns erstellt (in German). Berlin and Boston: De Gruyter.
