= March 28 (Eastern Orthodox liturgics) =

Day in the Eastern Orthodox liturgical calendar

Eastern Orthodox liturgical calendar
March 27	March 28	March 29
March 28 O.S. ≍ April 10 N.S. March 28 N.S ≍ March 15 O.S.

An Eastern Orthodox cross

March 28 in Eastern Orthodox liturgical calendars is a feast day and a day of commemoration of saints and martyrs. Although some Orthodox churches use the Revised Julian Calendar and others use the traditional Julian calendar, the fixed commemorations for their respective March 28 are broadly the same, no matter which calendar is used. (Note: Despite the dates being the same, the days to which they refer typically differ by 13 days. The notation Old Style or O.S. is sometimes used to indicate a date in the traditional Julian Calendar (the "Old Calendar"). The notation New Style or N.S. indicates a date in the Revised Julian calendar (the "New Calendar").)

== Saints ==
- Apostle Herodion of Patras of the Seventy Apostles (1st century)
- Martyrs Priscus, Malchus, and Alexander, of Caesarea of Palestine (259) (Note: "At Caesarea, in Palestine, the birthday of the holy martyrs Priscus, Malchus, and Alexander. In the persecution of Valerian, they were dwelling in the suburbs of Caesarea, but knowing that in the city the heavenly crown of martyrdom was to be gained, and burning with the divine ardor of faith, they go to the judge of their own accord, rebuke him for shedding the blood of the faithful in torrents, and are forthwith condemned to be devoured by beasts for the name of Christ.")
- Martyrs Jonah and Barachisius and those with them in Persia (330): (see also: March 29)

- Zanithas, Lazarus, Maruthas (Marotas), Narses, Elias, Marinus (Mares), Abibus, Sembeeth (Sivsithina), and Sabbas.

- Venerable Hesychios the Theologian of Jerusalem (434), disciple of St. Gregory the Theologian.
- Venerable Hilarion the New, Abbot of Pelekete Monastery near Prusa (754)
- Saint Stephen the Confessor and Wonderworker, Abbot of Tryglia (815) (see also: March 26)
- Hieromartyrs George, Bishop of Zagora, Parodus and Peter, priests, and Martyr Prince Enravota-Boyan (833), of Bulgaria.

== Pre-Schism Western saints ==
- Martyrs Rogatus, Successus and Companions, a group of eighteen martyrs in North Africa.
- Saint Sixtus III (Xystus), Pope of Rome from 432 (440). (Note: A Roman by birth, he is remembered for opposing Nestorianism and Pelagianism and restoring several Roman basilicas.)
- Saint Spes (Speus), an Abbot of Campi in central Italy (ca. 513) (Note: He was totally blind for forty years, but fifteen days before his repose his eyesight was restored.) (Note: "At Norcia, the abbot St. Speus, a man of extraordinary patience, whose soul at its departure from this life was seen by all his brethren to ascend to heaven in the shape of a dove.")
- Saint Gontram (Gunthrammus), a repentant King of Burgundy in France (592)
- Saint Gundelindis (Guendelindis), a daughter of the Duke of Alsace and niece of St Ottilia, whom she succeeded as Abbess of Niedermünster Abbey (ca. 750)
- Saint Tutilo (Tuotilo), a gifted and artistic monk at St Gall Abbey in Switzerland (ca. 915)

== Post-Schism Orthodox saints ==
- Venerable Martyr Eustratius of the Kiev Caves (1097)
- Saint Mstislav, Prince of Vladimir-Suzdal, son of Prince Andrey Bogolyubsky (1173) (Note: See also: (in Russian) Мстислав Андреевич. Википедии. (Russian Wikipedia).)
- Venerable Hilarion, monk, of Gdov, Pskov (1476)
- Venerable Dionysius the Merciful, Bishop of Larissa (1510)
- Venerable Jonah, Abbot of Klimets Monastery, Olonets (1534)
- Saint John, Bishop of Manglisi, Georgia (1751)
- Saint Gavrielia (Papagiannis) the 'Ascetic of Love', a trained physiotherapist, who became a Greek Orthodox nun, known for her care of the poor and sick (1992) (Note: She was glorified by the Ecumenical Patriarchate on October 3, 2023. The official communiqué of the Ecumenical Patriarchate was as follows: (in Greek) "Κατά τήν πρώτην συνεδρίαν, εἰσηγήσει τῆς Κανονικῆς Ἐπιτροπῆς, κατετάγη εἰς τό Ἁγιολόγιον τῆς κατ᾿ Ἀνατολάς Ὀρθοδόξου Ἐκκλησίας ἡ Μοναχή Γαβριηλία (Παπαγιάννη), ἡ Κωνσταντινουπολίτις, ἡ ἐν Λέρῳ τελειωθεῖσα, διακριθεῖσα διά τάς κατά Χριστόν ἀρετάς τῆς ἐλεημοσύνης, τῆς φιλανθρωπίας καί τῆς ἀπολύτου ἀφοσιώσεως καί ἐμπιστοσύνης εἰς τό θέλημα τοῦ Κυρίου." The Ecumenical Patriarchate later signed the Act of canonization on December 28, 2023. This glorification was later criticized by the Church of Greece's Holy Metropolis of Piraeus (Office for Heresies and Parareligions), which issued a statement on April 22, 2024, questioning the holiness of Saint because: "...she is a person deeply eroded by ecumenist positions...")

=== New martyrs and confessors ===
- New Hieromartyr Nicholas Postnikov, Archpriest, of Timoshkino, Ryazan (1931) (Note: (in Russian) Св. Николая Постникова исп., пресвитера (1931).)
- New Hieromartyr Basil Malinin, Archpriest, of Pereslavl (1938) (Note: (in Russian) сщмч. Василия Малинина пресвитера (1938).)
- Martyr John Chernoff (1939) (Note: (in Russian) мч. Иоанна Чернова (1939).)
- New Hieromartyr Peter Ochryzko, Priest of Chartoviec, Chełm and Podlasie, Poland (1944) (Note: See: (in Polish) Piotr Ohryzko. Wikipedii. (Polish Wikipedia).)

== Other commemorations ==
- Repose of Abbot Adrian (in schema Alexis) of Konevits Monastery (1812)
- Repose of Blessed Helen of Arzamas, disciple of Abbot Nazarius of Valaam (1820)
- Icon of the Mother of God of "the Sign". (Note: The account of the Icon of the Sign is to be found on November 27. Today’s commemoration may be for a wonder-working copy of the original icon.)

== Icon gallery ==
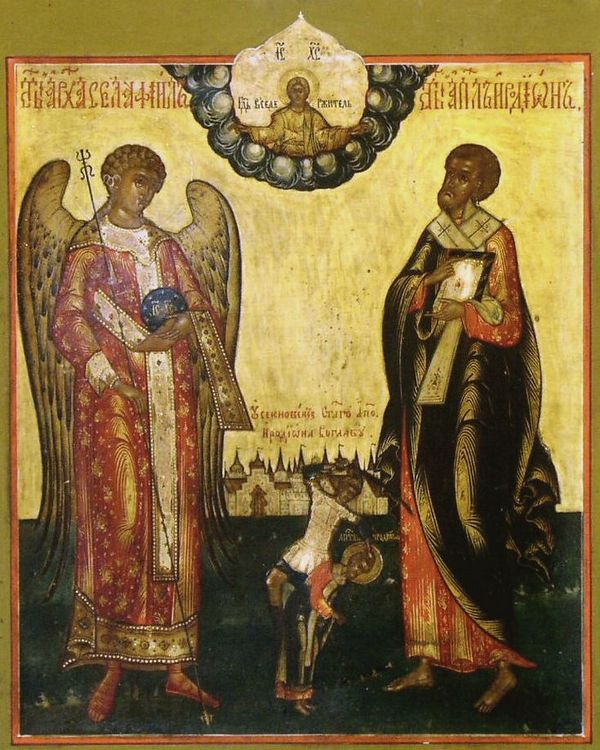
Herodion of Patras and Archangel Selaphiel (1840, Russia)

== Sources ==
- March 28/April 10. Orthodox Calendar (PRAVOSLAVIE.RU).
- April 10 / March 28. HOLY TRINITY RUSSIAN ORTHODOX CHURCH (A parish of the Patriarchate of Moscow).
- March 28. OCA - The Lives of the Saints.
- The Autonomous Orthodox Metropolia of Western Europe and the Americas (ROCOR). St. Hilarion Calendar of Saints for the year of our Lord 2004. St. Hilarion Press (Austin, TX). p. 25.
- March 28. Latin Saints of the Orthodox Patriarchate of Rome.
- The Roman Martyrology. Transl. by the Archbishop of Baltimore. Last Edition, According to the Copy Printed at Rome in 1914. Revised Edition, with the Imprimatur of His Eminence Cardinal Gibbons. Baltimore: John Murphy Company, 1916. p. 89.

Greek Sources

- Great Synaxaristes: (in Greek) 28 ΜΑΡΤΙΟΥ. ΜΕΓΑΣ ΣΥΝΑΞΑΡΙΣΤΗΣ.
- (in Greek) Συναξαριστής. 28 Μαρτίου. ECCLESIA.GR. (H ΕΚΚΛΗΣΙΑ ΤΗΣ ΕΛΛΑΔΟΣ).

Russian Sources

- (in Russian) 10 апреля (28 марта). Православная Энциклопедия под редакцией Патриарха Московского и всея Руси Кирилла (электронная версия). (Orthodox Encyclopedia - Pravenc.ru).
- (in Russian) 28 марта (ст.ст.) 10 апреля 2013 (нов. ст.). Русская Православная Церковь Отдел внешних церковных связей. (DECR).
