= March 29 (Eastern Orthodox liturgics) =

Day in the Eastern Orthodox liturgical calendar

Eastern Orthodox liturgical calendar
March 28	March 29	March 30
March 29 O.S. ≍ April 11 N.S. March 29 N.S ≍ March 16 O.S.

An Eastern Orthodox cross

March 29 in Eastern Orthodox liturgical calendars is a feast day and a day of commemoration of saints and martyrs. Although some Orthodox churches use the Revised Julian Calendar and others use the traditional Julian calendar, the fixed commemorations for their respective March 29 are broadly the same, no matter which calendar is used. (Note: Despite the dates being the same, the days to which they refer typically differ by 13 days. The notation Old Style or O.S. is sometimes used to indicate a date in the traditional Julian Calendar (the "Old Calendar"). The notation New Style or N.S. indicates a date in the Revised Julian calendar (the "New Calendar").)

== Saints ==
- Martyrs Jonas and Barachisius, and companions, in Persia, under Shapur II (330): (Note: "IN Persia, the holy martyrs Jonas and Barachisius, under Sapor, king of Persia. Jonas, being pressed in a vice till his bones were broken, was cut in twain; Barachisius was suffocated by burning pitch poured into his throat.") (see also: March 28)

- Abibus, Zanithas, Elias (Helias), Lazarus, Mares, Maruthas, Narses, Sabbas, Simiathos (Sebeethes, Symeethes).

- Saint Mark the Confessor, Bishop of Arethusa (364)
- Hieromartyr Cyril, Deacon, of Heliopolis, and others, who suffered under Julian the Apostate (364)
- Venerable John of Egypt, anchorite (4th century)
- Saint Diadochos of Photiki, Bishop of Photike in Old Epirus, whose works are included in the Philokalia (ca. 486)
- Venerable Hesychios the Sinaite, Abbot of Saint Catherine's Monastery at Mount Sinai (7th century)
- Saint Eustathius the Confessor, Bishop of Kios in Bithynia (9th century)

== Pre-Schism Western saints ==
- Martyr Secundus of Asti, a noble from Asti in Piedmont in Italy and an officer in the imperial army, beheaded in Asti under Hadrian (119)
- Saints Armogastes and Companions (c. 460) (Note: Armogastes and Saturus, high officers at the palace, suffered in North Africa during the Arian persecution under the Vandal King Genseric. First they were tortured, then sent to hard labour in the mines, finally condemned to slavery as cowherds near Carthage. They were not put to death 'in case the Romans should venerate them as martyrs'.) (Note: "In Africa, under the Arian king Genseric, during the persecution of the Vandals, the holy confessors Armogastes, count, Mascula, Archimimus, and Saturus, master of the king's household. Having endured many severe torments, as well as reproaches, for the confession of the truth, they reached the end of their glorious combats.")
- Saints Gwynllyw (Gundleus) and Gwladys (Gladys), parents of St. Cadoc (5th century)
- Saint Firminus, Bishop of Viviers in France (6th century)
- Saint Lasar (Lassar, Lassera), a nun in Ireland and niece of St Forchera (6th century)
- Saint Eustasius of Luxeuil (Eustace), Abbot of Luxeuil (625) (Note: A favourite disciple and monk of St Columbanus, whom he succeeded as second Abbot of Luxeuil in France. There were some six hundred monks there, many of whom became saints.)

== Post-Schism Orthodox saints ==
- Venerable Jonah (1480), Mark (15th century), and Bassa of the Pskov-Caves Monastery. (Note: "St Marko was of the Kyiv Caves Monastery who came to Pskov to establish a similar monastic establishment there. The history of the Pskov Caves relates that many Kyiv Caves monastics came there, although their names are mostly not recorded for posterity. The Pskov Caves Monastery is a "daughter monastery" of the Kyiv Caves.")
- Saint Nicetas, desert-dweller of the Roslavl Forests, near Bryansk (1793)

=== New martyrs and confessors ===
- New Martyrs Priest Paul Voinarsky, and brothers Paul and Alexis Kiryan, of the Crimea (1919)
- New Hieromartyr Michael Victorov, Archpriest, of Boloshnevo, Ryazan (1933)

== Icon gallery ==
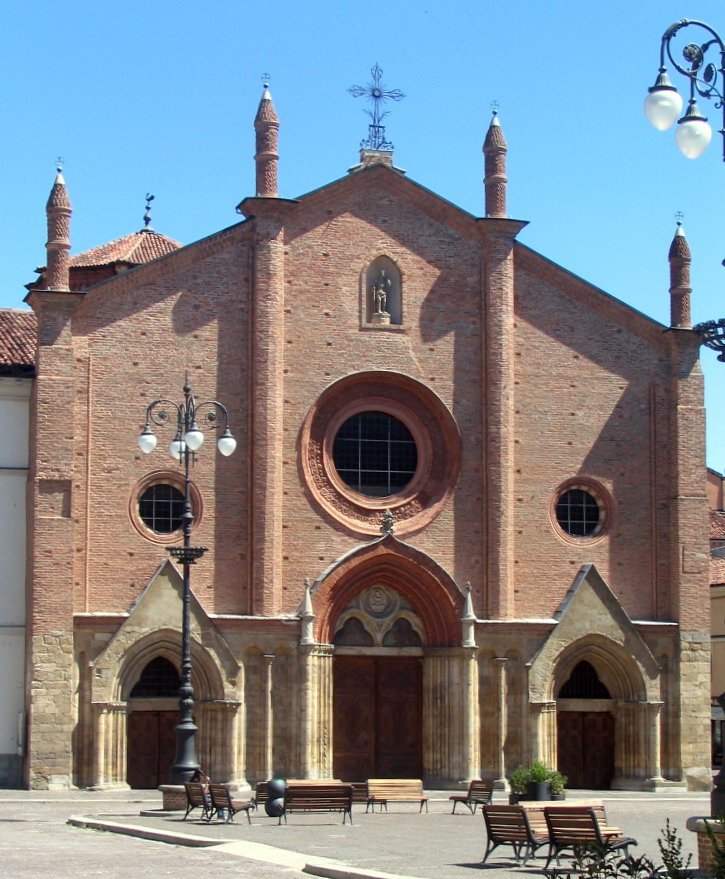
Collegiate church of San Secondo in Asti.

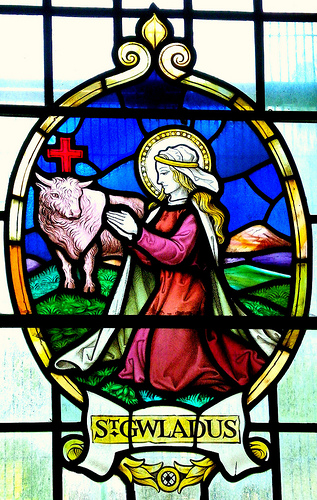
St Gwladys in stained glass.

== Sources ==
- March 29/April 11. Orthodox Calendar (PRAVOSLAVIE.RU).
- April 11 / March 29. HOLY TRINITY RUSSIAN ORTHODOX CHURCH (A parish of the Patriarchate of Moscow).
- March 29. OCA - The Lives of the Saints.
- The Autonomous Orthodox Metropolia of Western Europe and the Americas (ROCOR). St. Hilarion Calendar of Saints for the year of our Lord 2004. St. Hilarion Press (Austin, TX). p. 25.
- March 29. Latin Saints of the Orthodox Patriarchate of Rome.
- The Roman Martyrology. Transl. by the Archbishop of Baltimore. Last Edition, According to the Copy Printed at Rome in 1914. Revised Edition, with the Imprimatur of His Eminence Cardinal Gibbons. Baltimore: John Murphy Company, 1916. p. 90.
- Rev. Richard Stanton. A Menology of England and Wales, or, Brief Memorials of the Ancient British and English Saints Arranged According to the Calendar, Together with the Martyrs of the 16th and 17th Centuries. London: Burns & Oates, 1892. pp. 136–137.

Greek Sources

- Great Synaxaristes: (in Greek) 29 ΜΑΡΤΙΟΥ. ΜΕΓΑΣ ΣΥΝΑΞΑΡΙΣΤΗΣ.
- (in Greek) Συναξαριστής. 29 Μαρτίου. ECCLESIA.GR. (H ΕΚΚΛΗΣΙΑ ΤΗΣ ΕΛΛΑΔΟΣ).

Russian Sources

- (in Russian) April 11 (March 29). Православная Энциклопедия под редакцией Патриарха Московского и всея Руси Кирилла (электронная версия). (Orthodox Encyclopedia - Pravenc.ru).
- (in Russian) 29 марта (ст.ст.) 11 апреля 2013 (нов. ст.). Русская Православная Церковь Отдел внешних церковных связей. (DECR).
