= March 15 (Eastern Orthodox liturgics) =

Day in the Eastern Orthodox liturgical calendar

Eastern Orthodox liturgical calendar
March 14	March 15	March 16
March 15 O.S. ≍ March 28 N.S. March 15 N.S ≍ March 2 O.S.

An Eastern Orthodox cross

March 15 in Eastern Orthodox liturgical calendars is a feast day and a day of commemoration of saints and martyrs. Although some Orthodox churches use the Revised Julian Calendar and others use the traditional Julian calendar, the fixed commemorations for their respective March 15 are broadly the same, no matter which calendar is used. (Note: Despite the dates being the same, the days to which they refer typically differ by 13 days. The notation Old Style or O.S. is sometimes used to indicate a date in the traditional Julian Calendar (the "Old Calendar"). The notation New Style or N.S. indicates a date in the Revised Julian calendar (the "New Calendar").)

== Saints ==
- Apostle Aristobulus of the Seventy, first bishop of Britain (1st century) (Note: Traditionally one of the Seventy, he is the Aristobulus mentioned by St Paul (Romans 16,11). Britain was given to him as the place of his preaching and martyrdom.) (see also: March 16)
- Martyrs Agapius, and with him seven martyrs (303):

- Publius (Pauplios); Timolaus; Romulus; two named Dionysius; and two named Alexander; at Caesarea in Palestine.

- Hieromartyr Alexander of Side in Pamphylia (270-275)
- Martyr Nicander of Egypt (305)
- Saint Hebarestes, steward of a church located in Jerusalem.

== Pre-Schism Western saints ==
- Martyr Mancius (5th or 6th century) (Note: Born in Rome, he was bought as a slave by Jewish traders and taken to Evora in Portugal where he was martyred by his masters.)
- Saint Speciosus, a monk at Terracina in Italy (c. 555) (Note: A wealthy landowner from Campania in Italy who became a monk at Montecassino with his brother Gregory. He was attached to the new foundation at Terracina but reposed in Capua.)
- Saint Probus of Rieti, Bishop of Rieti in central Italy (c. 571)
- Saint Zachariah, Pope of Rome (752) (Note: He was born in San Severino in Calabria in Italy of a Greek family. Chosen Pope of Rome in 741, he was influential in helping Europe remain Orthodox.)
- Saint Leocritia (Lucretia), a holy virgin in Cordoba in Spain (859) (Note: Her parents were Moors, but she was converted to Orthodoxy and as a result was driven from her home. She was sheltered by St Eulogius but both were flogged and beheaded.)

== Post-Schism Orthodox saints ==
- Saint Nicander, monk, of Gorodetsk, Nizhni-Novgorod (1603)
- New Martyr Manuel of Crete (1792)
- Hieromartyr Parthenios, Deacon, at Didymoteicho (1805)

=== New martyrs and confessors ===
- New Hieromartyr Alexis Vinogradov, Protopresbyter of Novotroitskoye, Tver (1938)
- New Hieromartyr Demetrius Legeydo, Priest of Chimkent (1938)
- New Hieromartyr Michael Bogoslovsky, Protopresbyter of Simferopol-Crimea (1940)

== Other commemorations ==
- Commemoration of the deliverance of the island of Lefkada from the earthquake of 1938.

== Icon gallery ==
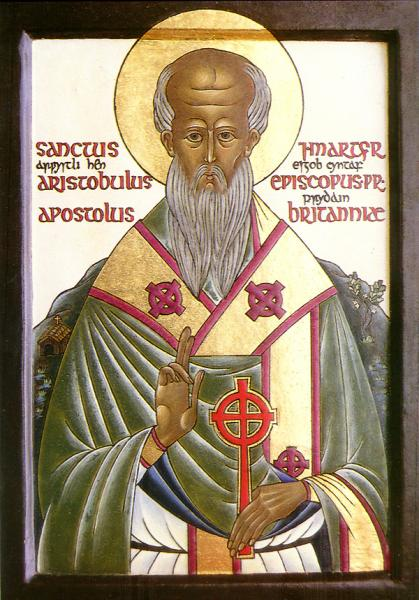
Apostle Aristobulus of Britannia.

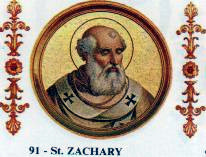
Saint Zachariah, Pope of Rome.

== Sources ==
- March 15/March 28. Orthodox Calendar (PRAVOSLAVIE.RU).
- March 28 / March 15. HOLY TRINITY RUSSIAN ORTHODOX CHURCH (A parish of the Patriarchate of Moscow).
- Complete List of Saints. Protection of the Mother of God Church (POMOG).
- March 15. OCA - The Lives of the Saints.
- The Autonomous Orthodox Metropolia of Western Europe and the Americas (ROCOR). St. Hilarion Calendar of Saints for the year of our Lord 2004. St. Hilarion Press (Austin, TX). p. 22.
- March 15. Latin Saints of the Orthodox Patriarchate of Rome.
- The Roman Martyrology. Transl. by the Archbishop of Baltimore. Last Edition, According to the Copy Printed at Rome in 1914. Revised Edition, with the Imprimatur of His Eminence Cardinal Gibbons. Baltimore: John Murphy Company, 1916. pp. 76–77.

Greek Sources

- Great Synaxaristes: (in Greek) 15 ΜΑΡΤΙΟΥ. ΜΕΓΑΣ ΣΥΝΑΞΑΡΙΣΤΗΣ.
- (in Greek) Συναξαριστής. 15 Μαρτίου. ECCLESIA.GR. (H ΕΚΚΛΗΣΙΑ ΤΗΣ ΕΛΛΑΔΟΣ).

Russian Sources

- (in Russian) 28 марта (15 марта). Православная Энциклопедия под редакцией Патриарха Московского и всея Руси Кирилла (электронная версия). (Orthodox Encyclopedia - Pravenc.ru).
- (in Russian) 15 марта (ст.ст.) 28 марта 2013 (нов. ст.). Русская Православная Церковь Отдел внешних церковных связей. (DECR).
