= Adélaïde Ducluzeau =

French porcelain painter (1787-1849)

Marie-Adélaïde Durand-Ducluzeau
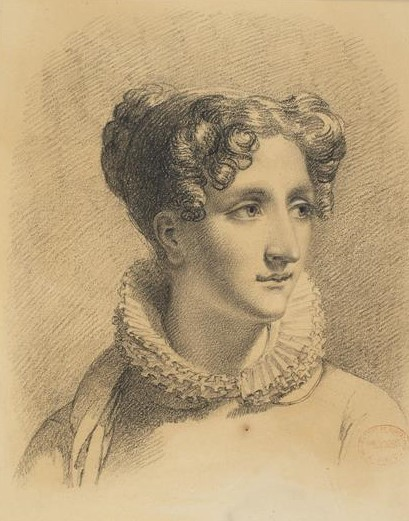
- Portrait of Marie-Adélaïde Durand-Ducluzeau by her sister Joséphine Rullier (1826)
- Born: 15 March 1787; Paris, France
- Died: 1 August 1849 (aged 62); Paris, France
- Citizenship: France
- Notable work: Sèvres vases with royal portraits (1836)
- Movement: 19th-century porcelain painting

Adélaïde Ducluzeau (née Marie-Adélaïde Durand; 15 March 1787– 1 August 1849) was a French porcelain painter, known for her work at the Manufacture nationale de Sèvres and for her master copies on porcelain. Active between 1818 and 1848, the artist also ran a small private art school. She died during the Paris cholera epidemic of 1849.

== Early life and training ==
Marie-Adélaïde Durand was born in Paris on 15 March 1787 into a wealthy family. Her father, a building contractor, encouraged her artistic interests, which she shared with her sister Joséphine. At an early age, she trained under the neoclassical painter Jean-Baptiste Regnault, with whom she developed a foundation in academic figure painting.

Initially pursuing art for personal enjoyment, a change in her financial situation led her to turn to the commercial practice of painting on porcelain. Around 1816 she entered the studio of Marie-Victoire Jaquotot, a leading figure of the era, who subsequently introduced her to professional work at the Manufacture de Sèvres. (Note: Jaquotot established her porcelain painting studio in 1816, instructing a cohort of around thirty students.)

== Family ==
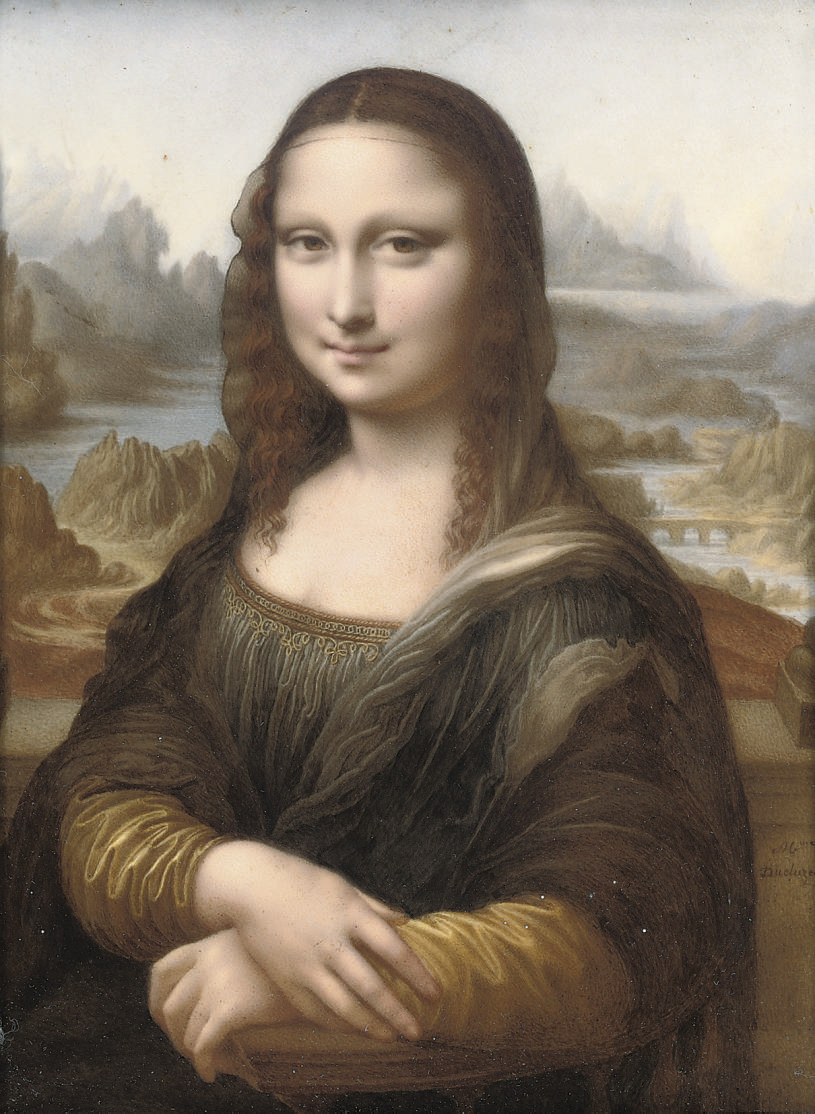
Durand-Ducluzeau's Mona Lisa, after Leonardo da Vinci

Durand-Ducluzeau married François Ducluzeau, a lawyer in the imperial court. In 1807, they had a daughter, Adélaïde Claire, who later became an artist. The Durand-Ducluzeau couple lived together at 14, rue Neuve-Saint-Roch, near the Louvre in Paris, and jointly owned property in the Charenton and Saint-Maurice area to the south of the city. In 1813 they sold this property to Emperor Napoleon, with the transaction formally accepted by Jean-Baptiste Nompère, Comte de Champagny, a high-ranking official. Records indicate that the couple were judicially separated in later years.

After their separation, Durand-Ducluzeau maintained a close connection to the neighbourhood of Saint-Germain-des-Prés, where she, her daughter and sister Joséphine all lived within a few hundred metres of one another. (Note: In the 1830s, she is recorded at 18 rue Saint-Benoît and 16 rue Jacob.) Joséphine Durand exhibited at the Salon under her married name, Rullier, while Adélaïde Claire used the pseudonym Zodalie-Michel Ducluseau.

== Career at the Manufacture de Sèvres ==
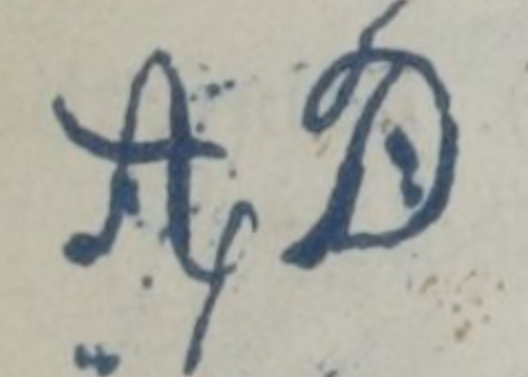
Durand-Ducluzeau's monogram

The Manufacture de Sèvres was the leading state porcelain manufactory in France and one of the most prestigious ceramic institutions in Europe. Founded in 1740 at Vincennes and transferred to Sèvres in 1756, it operated under royal patronage, producing porcelain for the court, elite clientele and for use as diplomatic gifts. While Durand-Ducluzeau was active there, the manufactory combined artistic production with technical research and employed highly trained painters, sculptors, and chemists, offering women artists opportunities for specialised professional work.

An assessment of Durand-Ducluzeau's work appears in the late 1980s within Jean-Pierre Cuzin's book on Raphaël and French art, which singles her out as one of the most accomplished porcelain painters at Sèvres during the directorship of Alexandre Brongniart, in the company of Victoire Jaquotot and Abraham Constantin. While working at the manufactory, she copied works after artists such as Carracci, Domenichino, and Gérard. Her pieces required exceptional technical skill, often involving multiple firings and careful repainting to achieve precise colour and detail. Her painted porcelain bowl, Coupe des sens (1825), remains one of the Manufacture's most celebrated decorative works of the period.

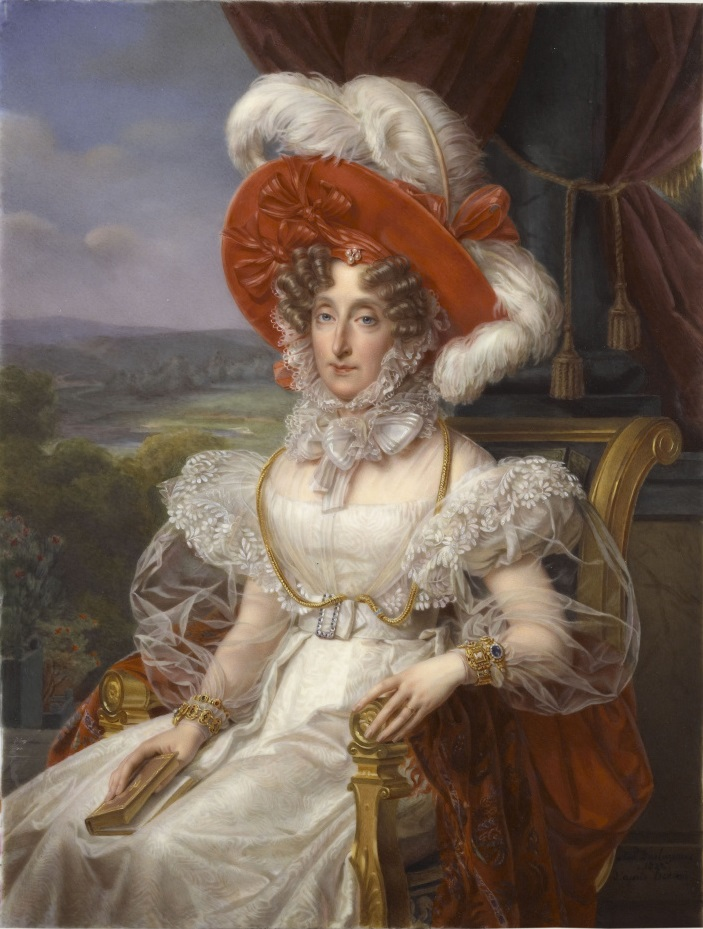
Durand-Ducluzeau's portrait of Maria Amalia, after Hersent

Durand-Ducluzeau joined the Sèvres manufactory in 1818 as a figure painter on a temporary basis, as was customary for women, and was formally appointed to the permanent staff six years later. Despite recognition at the Salon and patronage from King Louis-Philippe, contemporaries at Sèvres expressed doubt in her technical abilities. On 22 March 1821, Brongniart rejected her request to copy a full-length portrait of the Duchesse de Berry, citing doubts about her ability to execute a work of such significance. Brongniart's lack of confidence in her talent as a copyist has been cited as a reason why, unlike some of her contemporaries at Sèvres, Durand-Ducluzeau produced relatively few reproductions of the master Raphael.

Durand-Ducluzeau was also paid 2,000 francs (equivalent to €7,300 in 2025) for the porcelain plaques of the Pendule de l'Horlogerie (1837), only half that awarded to the porcelain painter Antoine Béranger for the same designs.

Brongniart's successor, Jacques-Joseph Ebelmen was supportive of Durand-Ducluzeau's talent, remarking that she stood alone in her ability to reproduce museum paintings on porcelain. Over three decades at Sèvres, Durand-Ducluzeau's work consisted primarily of finely detailed porcelain paintings, including both decorative objects and reproductions of master paintings.

== Later life and death ==
In later life, Durand-Ducluzeau settled on the quai Voltaire, opposite the Louvre. From December 1844, in parallel with her work at the Manufacture de Sèvres, she ran a private atelier for women there where she instructed pupils in drawing, oil painting, and porcelain painting, based on direct observation rather than copying of other artworks. (Note: Durand-Ducluzeau's known pupils are mentioned in the Salon catalogues above as "élève de Mme Ducluzeau".)

Durand-Ducluzeau's career at Sèvres was curtailed by administrative reforms. On 28 April 1848, she was formally retired and granted a monthly pension of 150 francs. Shortly afterwards, a carriage accident left her in weakened health, and she was struck by cholera amidst the 1849 outbreak in Paris. Durand-Ducluzeau died at her home on 1 August 1849, aged 62. She was buried at the Cimetière de Montparnasse.

== Participation at the Salon ==
Durand-Ducluzeau exhibited regularly at the Paris Salons from 1831 to 1845, receiving official recognition for her work. She was awarded a third-class medal in 1831 and a first-class medal in 1843. Her submissions were primarily porcelain paintings, often reproducing well-known works by established painters. Her Salon entries included:

- 1831: Portrait of the Countess of F... / Portrait de Mme la Comtesse de F ...; Sainte-Thérèse, after Gérard
- 1833: A Holy Trinity (silence) / Une Sainte Famille (Le Silence), after Carrache; Portraits from Life / Portraits d'après nature
- 1836: Portrait of Van Dyck / Portrait de Van Dyck, after Van Dyck; Set of several portraits done from life, porcelain / Cadre de plusieurs portraits d'après nature
- 1843: Portrait d'homme, after Tintoretto (Note: The original work on which the copy was based was later reattributed to Jan van Calcar.)
- 1845: End of the Mass / La fin de la messe; Seven porcelain portraits, including S.A.R. Mgr le duc d'Orléans, prince royal, after Ingres, and S.A.R. Mgr le prince de Joinville, along with five other portraits.

== Royal Portraits ==
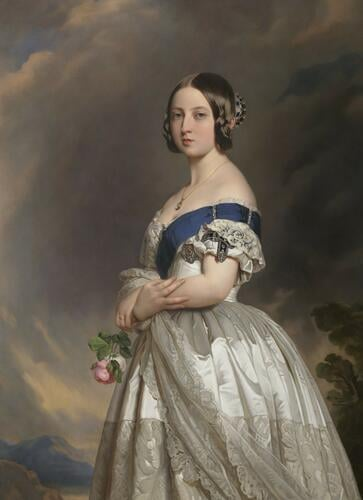
Copy of Winterhalter's portrait of Queen Victoria, 1846

Durand-Ducluzeau enjoyed the patronage of King Louis-Philippe, whose commissions included works later presented to Queen Victoria of the United Kingdom. In 1832, she painted a porcelain plaque of Louis-Philippe's wife Marie-Amélie, after a painting by Louis Hersent. The work entered the Sèvres sales inventory that year and was held in reserve by the Manufacture in 1847. Later it became part of the collection of the Musée national de Céramique (inv. MNC 6 393).

On 8 March 1836, the king commissioned a pair of monumental egg-shaped vases bearing portraits of himself and his daughter, Princess Clémentine. Durand-Ducluzeau's portraits were widely praised, noted as among the finest examples of porcelain portraiture produced by the Manufacture.

Durand-Ducluzeau further contributed the three porcelain plaques for the Pendule de l'Horlogerie (1837), a monumental clock produced at Sèvres after designs by Alexandre-Évariste Fragonard. Durand-Ducluzeau's plaques depict a Roman orator with a water clock, the fourteenth-century astronomical clock of Padua, and Christiaan Huygens demonstrating the pendulum clock. Originally intended for Louis-Philippe's private apartments at the Palace of Saint-Cloud, the clock was delivered in 1839 and later presented to Queen Victoria in 1844, who highly valued the work, keeping it on display in her private sitting room at Windsor Castle for fifty-seven years.

Louis-Philippe later commissioned Durand-Ducluzeau to produce a life-size porcelain copy of Jean-Auguste-Dominique Ingres' portrait of the Duke of Orléans. This work was presented at the Exhibition of the Royal Manufactures on 3 June 1844 and subsequently shown at the Salon of 1845. Among her most ambitious royal commissions was a monumental porcelain portrait of Queen Victoria after Franz Xaver Winterhalter, painted on a plaque over one metre in height. Exhibited on 1 June 1846, the work drew significant attention.

== Selected other works ==
Year	Work	Description	Reference
1824	Ourika vase	Large Sèvres vase commissioned by the Duchesse de Duras, reproducing a now-lost painting by François Gérard illustrating the opening scene of Duras' novel Ourika. Durand-Ducluzeau's work, now at the Château d'Ussé, survives alongside an aquatint print of the same composition by Henri-Alfred Johannot.	
1825	Coupe des Sens	Footed porcelain bowl painted after Alexandre-Évariste Fragonard, designed in 1806 by Brongniart (coupe B). The outer surface features allegories of the Five Senses in sixteenth-century dress, reflecting the period's taste for the picturesque.	
1834	Portrait of Van Dyck (after Van Dyck)	Porcelain copy of Van Dyck's self-portrait. Begun in March 1833, the first firing in 1834 was judged imperfect. Durand-Ducluzeau repainted it on a new plaque for the 1835 Exhibition of the Royal Manufactures at the Louvre, completing five firings to achieve the final finish. She earned 4,000 francs for her work.	
1840	So-called guéridon table	Painted panels for a table dedicated to Raphael, designed by A. Chenavard and Combette and executed by Durand-Ducluzeau after Bézard.	
1845	La fin de la messe	Porcelain painting exhibited as no. 506.	
1848	La Vierge au voile (after Raphael)	Painted porcelain copy of Raphael's work, based on the original in the Louvre (no. 363). Her final work, also considered one of her most important.	
