= March 27 (Eastern Orthodox liturgics) =

Day in the Eastern Orthodox liturgical calendar

Eastern Orthodox liturgical calendar
March 26	March 27	March 28
March 27 O.S. ≍ April 9 N.S. March 27 N.S ≍ March 14 O.S.

An Eastern Orthodox cross

March 27 in Eastern Orthodox liturgical calendars is a feast day and a day of commemoration of saints and martyrs. Although some Orthodox churches use the Revised Julian Calendar and others use the traditional Julian calendar, the fixed commemorations for their respective March 27 are broadly the same, no matter which calendar is used. (Note: Despite the dates being the same, the days to which they refer typically differ by 13 days. The notation Old Style or O.S. is sometimes used to indicate a date in the traditional Julian Calendar (the "Old Calendar"). The notation New Style or N.S. indicates a date in the Revised Julian calendar (the "New Calendar").)

== Saints ==
- Prophet Hanani (Ananias) - (II Chronicles 16:7-10).
- Martyrs Philetas the Senator, his wife Lydia, their sons Macedon and Theoprepides, and Amphilochius, an officer in the army, with Chronidas, a notary (c. 121) (Note: "The same day, the Saints Philetus, senator, his wife Lydia, and their sons Macedon and Theoprepides; also Amphilochius, an officer in the army, and Chronidas, a notary, who were put to death for the confession of Christ.") (see also: March 23)
- Venerable Matrona of Thessalonica the Confessor (3rd-4th centuries)
- Martyrs Baruch and John, by the sword.
- Venerable Eutychios, monastic.
- Venerable Cyricus (Quiricus) of Apros, in Thrace, monastic.
- Martyrs Manuel and Theodosius (304)
- Saint John the Clairvoyant, anchorite of Lycopolis, Egypt (394)
- Saint Paphnutius of Thebes, disciple of Saint Anthony the Great (4th century) (see also: September 11)
- Saint Paul the Standard-bearer, Bishop of Corinth (c. 925)

== Pre-Schism Western saints ==
- Saint Augusta, daughter of the Teuton Duke of Friuli, martyred by her father, venerated in Serravalle near Treviso (5th century) (Note: Daughter of the Teuton Duke of Friuli. Her conversion to Christianity so enraged her father that he killed her with his own hands. She has been venerated from time immemorial in Serravalle near Treviso in the north of Italy.)
- Saint Amator (Amador), a hermit to whom several churches are dedicated in Portugal.
- Saint Rupert of Salzburg, Bishop of Salzburg (718) (Note: Probably born in France, he became Bishop of Worms and began to spread Orthodoxy in the south of Germany. He started in Regensburg and pushed his way along the Danube. The Duke of Bavaria gave him the old ruined town of Iuvavum, which Rupert rebuilt and called Salzburg. Here he founded the monastery of St Peter and the convent of Nonnberg, where his sister Ermentrude was abbess. He is venerated as the first Archbishop of Salzburg and Apostle of Bavaria and Austria.)
- Saint Romulus, Abbot of St Baudilius near Nîmes in France (c. 730) (Note: About 720 he and his monks fled before the invading Saracens and settled in a ruined monastery in Saissy-les-Bois.)
- Saint Suairlech, first Bishop of Fore in Westmeath, Ireland, from c. 735-750 (c. 750)
- Saint Alkelda (Alkeld, Athilda), martyred by the Danes (10th century) (Note: Two churches in Yorkshire in England are dedicated to this holy woman who was martyred by the Danes.)

== Post-Schism Orthodox saints ==
- Saint Ephraim of Rostov (1454)
- Saint Alexander, Abbot of Voche, near Galich (16th century)
- Saint Anthony (Stakhovsky), Metropolitan of Tobolsk in Siberia (1740)
- Saint Ambrose (Khelaia) the Confessor, Catholicos-Patriarch of All Georgia (1927) (see also: March 16)

== Other commemorations ==
- Icons of the Most Holy Theotokos on Mount Athos:

- "Glykophylousa" ("Sweet-kissing"), and
- "Of the Akathist"

- Repose of Elder Augustine of Philotheou, Mt. Athos (1965)

== Icon gallery ==
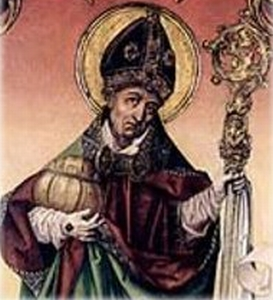
Saint Rupert of Salzburg.

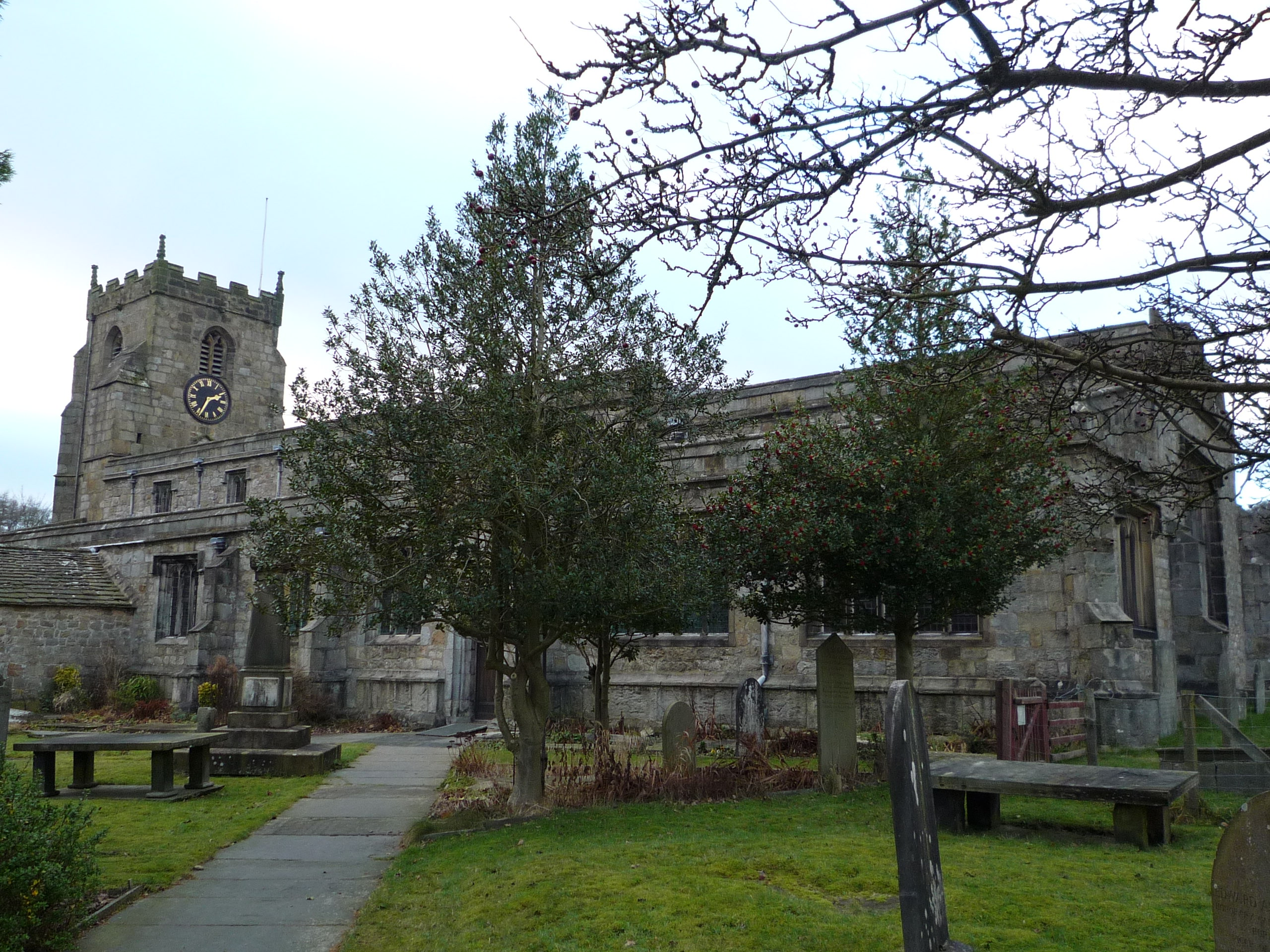
St. Alkelda's church, Giggleswick.

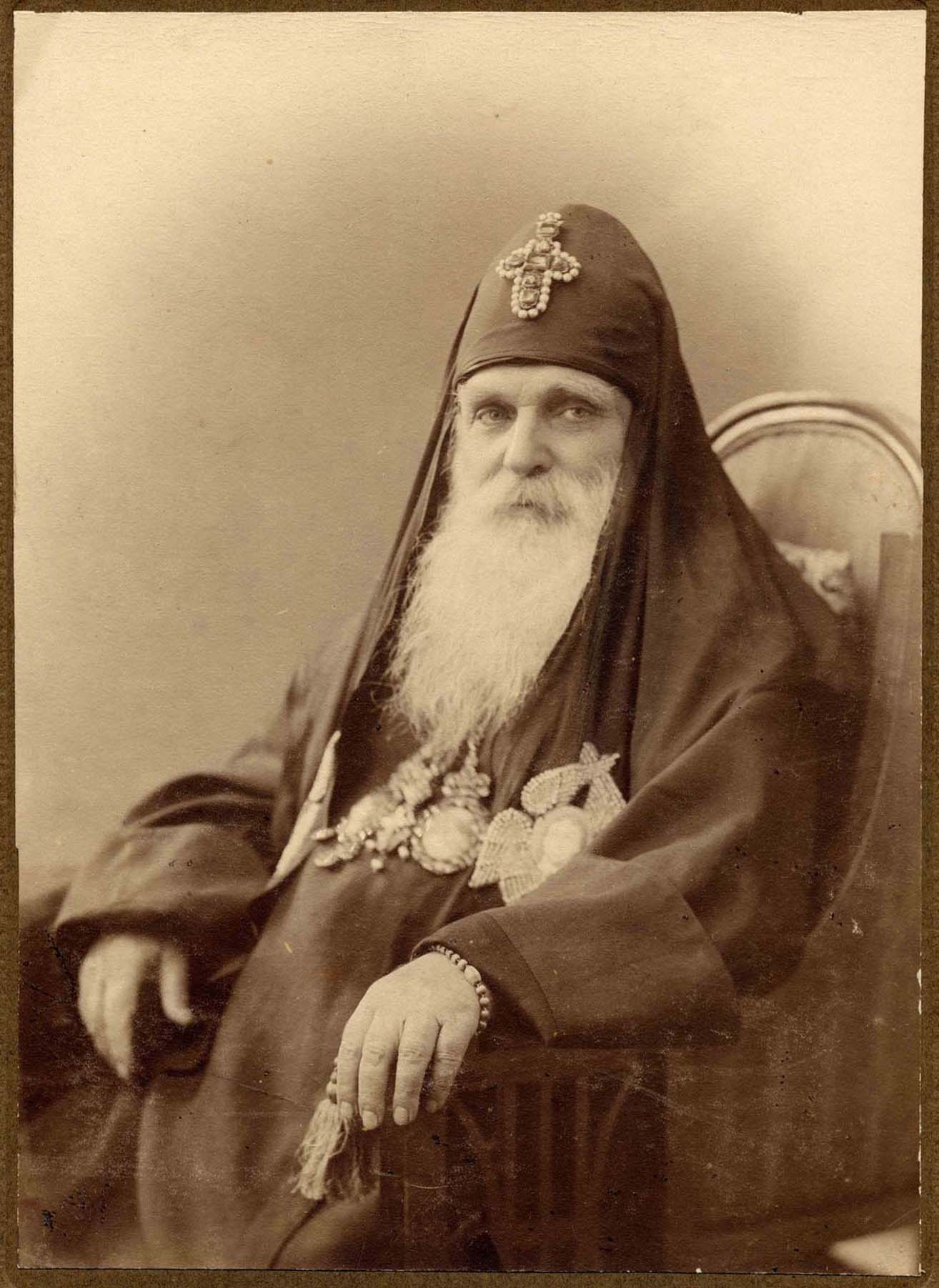
Ambrosius, Catholicos-Patriarch of All Georgia.

== Sources ==
- March 27/April 9. Orthodox Calendar (PRAVOSLAVIE.RU).
- April 9 / March 27. HOLY TRINITY RUSSIAN ORTHODOX CHURCH (A parish of the Patriarchate of Moscow).
- March 27. OCA - The Lives of the Saints.
- The Autonomous Orthodox Metropolia of Western Europe and the Americas (ROCOR). St. Hilarion Calendar of Saints for the year of our Lord 2004. St. Hilarion Press (Austin, TX). p. 24.
- March 27. Latin Saints of the Orthodox Patriarchate of Rome.
- The Roman Martyrology. Transl. by the Archbishop of Baltimore. Last Edition, According to the Copy Printed at Rome in 1914. Revised Edition, with the Imprimatur of His Eminence Cardinal Gibbons. Baltimore: John Murphy Company, 1916. pp. 88–89.
- Rev. Richard Stanton. A Menology of England and Wales, or, Brief Memorials of the Ancient British and English Saints Arranged According to the Calendar, Together with the Martyrs of the 16th and 17th Centuries. London: Burns & Oates, 1892. p. 135.

Greek Sources

- Great Synaxaristes: (in Greek) 27 ΜΑΡΤΙΟΥ. ΜΕΓΑΣ ΣΥΝΑΞΑΡΙΣΤΗΣ.
- (in Greek) Συναξαριστής. 27 Μαρτίου. ECCLESIA.GR. (H ΕΚΚΛΗΣΙΑ ΤΗΣ ΕΛΛΑΔΟΣ).

Russian Sources

- (in Russian) 9 апреля (27 марта). Православная Энциклопедия под редакцией Патриарха Московского и всея Руси Кирилла (электронная версия). (Orthodox Encyclopedia - Pravenc.ru).
- (in Russian) 27 марта (ст.ст.) 9 апреля 2013 (нов. ст.). Русская Православная Церковь Отдел внешних церковных связей. (DECR).
