= Pelekete Monastery =

Ruined Byzantine-era monastery in Turkey

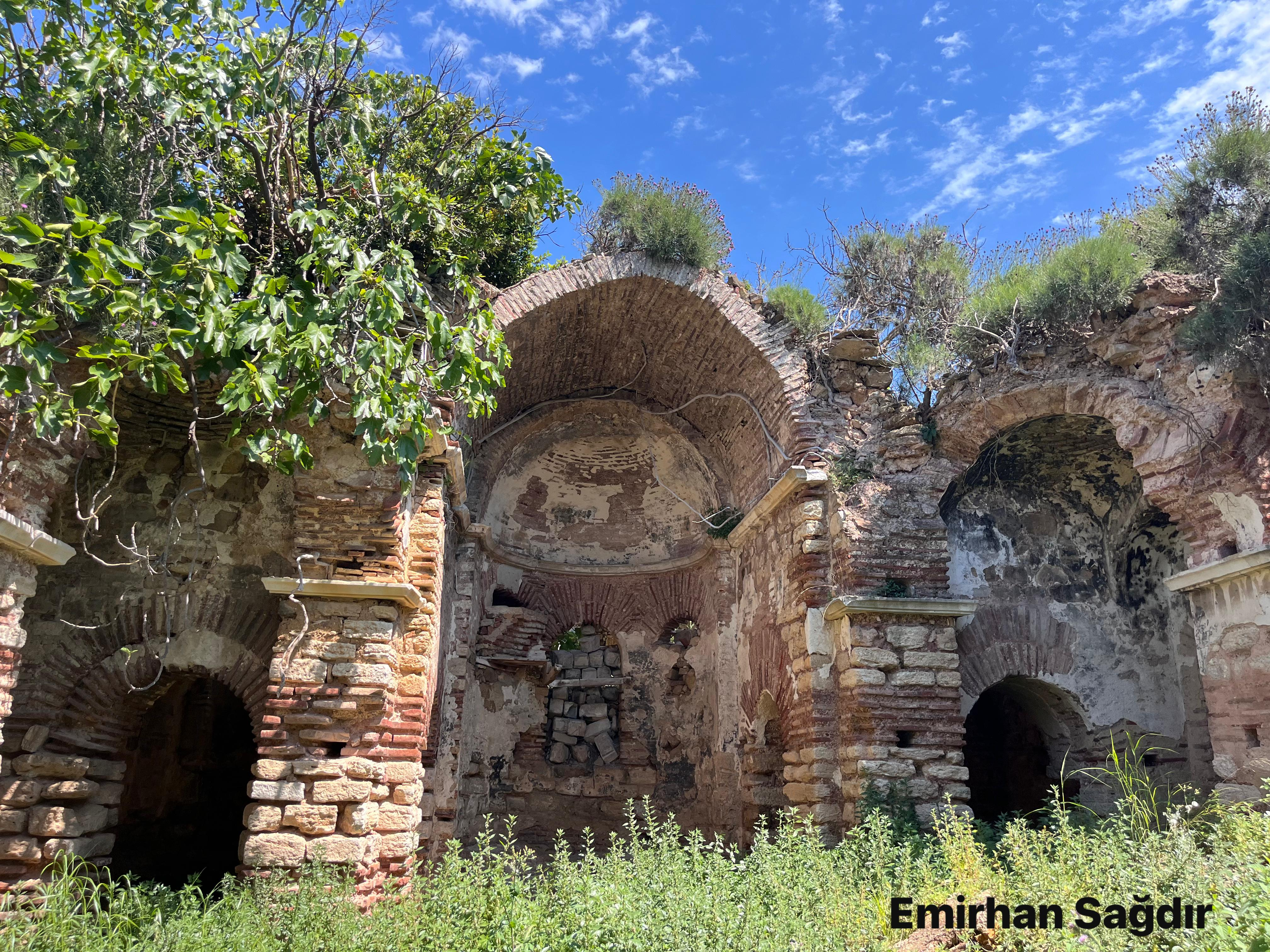
- Interactive map of Pelekete Monastery

Monastery information
- Other names: Agios Ioannes Theologos, Aya Yani
- Established: 709

Site
- Location: Tirilye, Turkey
- Coordinates: 40°23′21.97″N 28°45′11.98″E

The Monastery of Saint John the Theologian (Greek: Μονή Αγίου Ιωάννου του Θεολόγου), commonly known as the Pelekete Monastery (Turkish: Pelekete manastırı; Greek: Moνή Πελεκητής), is a ruined Byzantine-era monastery near modern Tirilye in Turkey (medieval Trigleia in Bithynia).

The monastery dates back to the 8th century, but its exact date of establishment is unknown. Its common name, "Pelekete", means "hewn with an axe" in Greek, and refers to its location on a steep rock. The monastery was a centre of iconodule opposition to Byzantine Iconoclasm, and in 763/4, it was attacked and burned down by the fanatically iconoclast governor Michael Lachanodrakon. Lachanodrakon tortured the monastery's hegoumenos, Theosteriktos, and other monks, 38 of whom were buried alive at Ephesus. The monastery was restored towards the end of the century after the end of the first period of Iconoclasm, and a certain Makarios became its hegoumenos. With the resumption of Iconoclasm after 813, he was exiled and imprisoned, but the monks of Pelekete continued to oppose Iconoclasm.

The monastery disappears thereafter from the sources, but is identified by modern scholars with the ruins of a monastery 5 km west from the town of Tirilye and dedicated to Saint John the Theologian. Locals today call it Aya Yani or Ayani, a corrupted form of its Greek name, meaning "Saint John".

== See also ==
- Hilarion the Younger

== Sources ==
- Talbot, Alice-Mary (1991). "Pelekete monastery". In Kazhdan, Alexander (ed.). The Oxford Dictionary of Byzantium. Oxford and New York: Oxford University Press. p. 1620. ISBN 0-19-504652-8.
