= Aristobulus of Britannia =

1st-century Christian bishop in Britannia and saint

Saint Aristobulus of Britannia
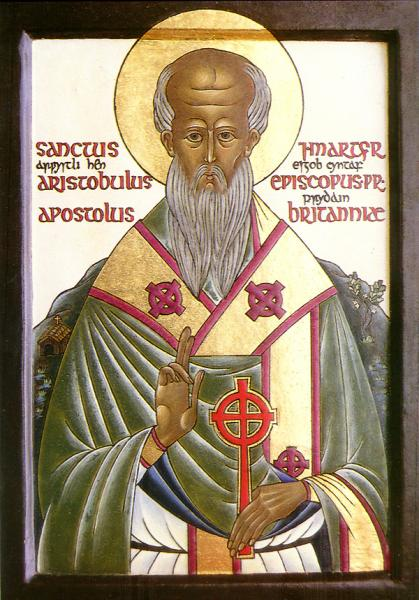
- Icon of Saint Aristibule the Old, Apostle, Martyr, and First Bishop of Britain

First Bishop of Britain
- Born: c. 1st century BC; Cyprus
- Died: c. 1st century AD; Wales
- Venerated in: Christianity
- Feast: 15 March (Eastern Orthodox) (Roman Catholic); 16 March (Anglican Communion) (Eastern Orthodox Russian); 19 Paremhat (Coptic Christianity)

Aristobulus of Britannia is a Christian saint named by Hippolytus of Rome (170–235) and Dorotheus of Gaza (505–565) as one of the Seventy Disciples mentioned in Luke 10:1–24 and as the first bishop in Roman Britain.

== Full title in various languages ==
- English: Saint Aristibule the Old, Apostle, Martyr, and First Bishop of Britain
- Ancient Greek: Ἅγιος Ἀριστόβουλος, ἐπίσκοπος Βρετανίας, ἀδελφός τοῦ ᾿Αποστόλου Βαρνάβα, translit. Hagios Aristoboulos episkopos Brettanias, adelphos tou apostolou Barnaba, transcr. (Byzantine/Modern) Aghios Apostolos Aristovoulos, episkopos Vrettanias, adelfos tou apostolou Varnava ("The Holy Apostle Aristobulus, Bishop of Britain, brother of the Apostle Barnabas")
- Latin: Sanctus Aristobulus Senex, Apostolus, Martyr, Episcopus Primus Britanniae
- Welsh: Arwystli Hen Episcob Cyntaf Prydain ("Aristibule the Old, First Bishop of Britain")

== Traditions ==
Pseudo-Hippolytus lists "Aristobulus, bishop of Britain" among the seventy disciples.

Aristobulus may be mentioned in the New Testament in the Epistle to the Romans (Romans 16:10: "...Salute them which are of Aristobulus' household") although this may mean members of the household of the late Aristobulus IV. According to Lionel Smithett Lewis, the writings of St Dorotheus, Bishop of Tyre AD 303, assert that Aristobulus, whom Paul saluted in the Epistle to the Romans, was the Bishop of Britain.

=== Greek, Latin, and Alexandrian traditions ===
Greek, Latin, and Alexandrian tradition says Aristobulus was the brother of the Apostle Barnabas, of Jewish Cypriot origin. Like Barnabas, he accompanied Saint Paul on his journeys. He was one of the assistants of Saint Andrew, along with Urban of Macedonia, Stachys, Ampliatus, Apelles of Heraklion and Narcissus of Athens (all of these names are mentioned together by St. Paul in Romans 16:8–11, which cannot be casual). On his missionary journey to Britain, he stopped to preach to the Celtiberians of northern Hispania. Specifically, Latin Catholic tradition identifies Aristobulus with Zebedee, father of James and John.

Aristobulus preached and died in Roman Britain. While some orthodox traditions say he "died in peace", others say he was martyred in Wales. Catholic tradition says he was martyred. The Benedictine monk Serenus de Cressy (1605–1674) maintained that Aristobulus was ordained by St. Paul and died at Glastonbury Abbey in 99; but Michael Alford (author of Fides Regia Britannica Sive Annales Ecclesiae Britannicae) says that Aristobulus was the husband of "Mary" Salome, which makes this date appear too late. Alford gives his death as "the second year of Nero" – 56. Alford also asserts that "It is perfectly certain that, before St Paul had come to Rome, Aristobulus was away in Britain". This is in accord with the date given by Gildas (c. 500–570 AD) that the "Light of Christ" shone in Britain in the last year of Emperor Tiberius. However, George Smith points out that this a misinterpretation of Gildas, and asserts that the Gospel was not preached in Britain before the reign of Claudius, whose full name was Tiberius Claudius Caesar Augustus Germanicus.

=== British tradition ===
From these traditions, it seems that Aristobulus was the founder of British Christianity. There is no evidence for any connection with Glastonbury and John Scott shows in An Early History of Glastonbury that the legend purporting that Joseph of Arimathea founded the Glastonbury Abbey there is of 12th or 13th-century origin and has no basis in fact. Rather, the early writings frequently centre on Aristobulus. There is no mention of Joseph prior to the Norman conquest of England. For this and other reasons, Smith also considers the account of Joseph of Arimathea a "superstitious fable of comparatively modern invention".

John Williams identifies Aristobulus with Arwystli Hen, a "man of Italy", and one of four missionaries believed to have brought Christianity to the British Isles. There is a tradition linking him to one of the medieval Welsh saints Arwstyl ap Cunedda. The title "Arwystli Hen" may have originated through a later British tradition.

== Herodian parallels ==
Aristobulus of Chalcis was the son of Herod of Chalcis and Mariamme, the daughter of Olympias. He married Salome, the daughter of Herod II and Herodias. They had three sons: Herod, Agrippa, and Aristobulus. Lionel Smithett Lewis maintains that this latter Aristobulus could have been the Aristobulus of Britannia, and referred to by Cressy. However, it is this man's father who was the husband of Salome, as mentioned by Alford (see previous section).

In 55, Nero appointed Aristobulus of Chalcis as King of Armenia Minor. He participated with his forces in the Roman–Parthian War of 58–63, where he received a small portion of Armenia in exchange, an area he continued to rule until 72 when Vespasian reduced the regional autonomy of some of the provinces.

It is probable that the "Philip" (mentioned above) are those mentioned in the New Testament are Philip the Tetrarch. The matter is disputed by scholars. There is no contemporary evidence for Philip the Tetrarch's use of the name "Herod Philip" as a dynastic title, as did occur with his brothers Herod Antipas and Herod Archelaus, yet he was of the same family and the scriptural reference may be emphasising this fact, as do later scriptural commentators. Today, Herod II is sometimes called "Herod Philip I" (because the gospels call the husband of Herodias "Philip"), and then Philip the Tetrarch is called "Herod Philip II", but this is an anachronistic convention. (Note: Note: It is an example of the great difficulty in establishing the relationships of various holders of the same name in the same area or family – especially in the Herodian dynasty.) Kokkinos says, "The stubborn existence of many theologians in referring to Herod III as 'Herod Philip' is without any value...No illusory Herod Philip ever existed."^{[p 223-233]; [266]} Philip the Tetrarch, "unlike his brothers, did not use Herod as a dynastic name." Philip's half-brothers, Archelaus and Antipas, had adopted the name of Herod, "presumably" for a dynastic claim from Herod the Great.

== Commemorations ==
The earliest date given for his feast is 17 March in the Adonis Martyrology. However, the Martyrology of Rome and equivalent Synaxaria of Constantinople and Alexandria all give his feast as 15 March. His feast is kept on this day on the Eastern Orthodox liturgical calendar, except for in the Russian Orthodox Church and those who follow her tradition, such as the OCA, where it is kept on 16 March in the Russian tradition such OCA. He is also one of the saints commemorated on 4 January (feast of the Seventy Disciples) and on 31 October (feast of the assistants of Saint Andrew). In the Roman Catholic liturgical calendar, his feast is 15 March.

== Sources ==
- Flavius, Josephus. "Antiquities of the Jews", Cambridge, Massachusetts: Harvard University Press, 1965: (Loeb Classical Library)
- St Nikolai Velimirovich, Prologue from Ohrid
- Lewis, Lionel Smithett (1955). St Joseph of Arimathea at Glastonbury. London: James Clarke & Co.
- Morley, Douglas S. The Early Church in Britain.
- Smith, George (1865). W. B. Smith (ed.). The History of the Religion of Ancient Britain (Third Revised ed.). London: Longman, Green, Longman, Roberts and Green. p. 114.
