= February 15 (Eastern Orthodox liturgics) =

Day in the Eastern Orthodox liturgical calendar

Eastern Orthodox liturgical calendar
February 14	February 15	February 16
February 15 O.S. ≍ February 28 N.S. February 15 N.S ≍ February 2 O.S.

An Eastern Orthodox cross

February 15 in Eastern Orthodox liturgical calendars is a feast day and a day of commemoration of saints and martyrs. Although some Orthodox churches use the Revised Julian Calendar and others use the traditional Julian calendar, the fixed commemorations for their respective February 15 are broadly the same, no matter which calendar is used. (Note: Despite the dates being the same, the days to which they refer typically differ by 13 days. The notation Old Style or O.S. is sometimes used to indicate a date in the traditional Julian Calendar (the "Old Calendar"). The notation New Style or N.S. indicates a date in the Revised Julian calendar (the "New Calendar").)

== Saints ==
- Apostle Onesimus of the Seventy (c. 109)
- Martyr Major of Gaza (302)
- Venerable Paphnutius, monk, and his daughter St. Euphrosyne, nun, of Alexandria (5th century) (see also: September 25)
- Venerable Eusebius, hermit, of Asikha in Syria (5th century)
- Saint Theognius, Bishop of Bethelia near Gaza (523)

== Pre-Schism Western saints ==
- Saints Faustinus and Jovita, two brothers, belonging to the nobility of Brescia in Italy, zealous preachers of Orthodoxy, beheaded in their native city under Hadrian (2nd century) (Note: "AT Brescia, in the time of the emperor Adrian, the birthday of the holy martyrs Faustinus and Jovita, who received the triumphant crown of martyrdom after many glorious combats for the faith of Christ.")
- Virgin-martyr Agape, in Terni (Teramo) in Italy (c. 273) (Note: She belonged to a group of virgins formed by St Valentine into a community.)
- Martyr Craton and Companions, converted to Christ by St Valentine, Bishop of Terni, martyred in Rome together with his wife and family (c. 273) (Note: "At Rome, St. Craton, martyr. A short time after being baptized with his wife and all his household by the holy bishop Valentine, he was put to death with them.")
- Martyrs Saturninus, Castulus, Magnus and Lucius, who belonged to the flock of St Valentine, Bishop of Terni in Italy (273)
- Saint Dochow (Dochau, Dogwyn), founder of a monastery in Cornwall (c. 473) (Note: St Dochdwy's Church, Llandough is named after him.)
- Saint Georgia, a holy virgin and later anchoress near Clermont in Auvergne in France (c. 500)
- Saint Severus, a priest from the Abruzzi in Italy (c. 530) (Note: St Gregory the Great relates that he brought a dead man back to life so that he could receive communion and unction.) (Note: "In the province of Valeria, St. Severus, a priest, of whom St. Gregory says, that by his tears he recalled a dead man to life.")
- Saint Quinidius, after living as a hermit in Aix in Provence, he became Bishop of Vaison in France (c. 579) (Note: "At Vaison, in France, St. Quinidius, bishop, whose death was precious in the sight of God, as is shown by frequent miracles.")
- Saint Farannan, Confessor, a disciple of St Columba at Iona in Scotland (c. 590) (Note: Eventually he returned to Ireland to lead the life of a hermit at All-Farannan, now Allernan, in Sligo.)
- Saint Berach (Barachias, Berachius), disciple of St Kevin and founder of a monastery at Clusin-Coirpte in Connaught (6th century)
- Saint Faustus, a disciple of St Benedict at Montecassino in Italy (6th century)
- Saint Oswy, King of Northumbria (670)
- Saint Decorosus, for thirty years Bishop of Capua in Italy, Confessor (695)
- Saint Walfrid (Gualfredo) della Gherardesca (765) (Note: Born in Pisa in Italy, he married and had five sons and one daughter. In later life he joined two other married men in founding the Monastery of Palazzuolo and a convent nearby for their wives and Walfrid's daughter. Walfrid was the first abbot and was succeeded by one of his sons.)
- Saints Winaman, Unaman and Sunaman, monks and nephews of St Sigfrid whom they followed to Sweden, martyred by pagans (c. 1040)
- Saint Sigfrid of Sweden, a priest and monk, probably at Glastonbury in England, who went to enlighten Sweden, based in Växjö, and converted King Olaf of Sweden (1045) (Note: After Ansgar, epithetised Apostle of the North, Sigfrid is revered as Second Apostle of the North, besides the missionary Rimbert of Turholt.)
- Saint Druthmar, a monk at Lorsch Abbey, in 1014 he became Abbot of Corvey in Saxony in Germany (1046)

== Post-Schism Orthodox saints ==
- Venerable Paphnutius, recluse of the Kiev Caves Monastery (13th century)
- Venerable Dalmatius of Siberia, Abbot and founder of the Dormition Monastery (1697) (Note: Elder Dalmat Isetsky (Dimitry Ivanovich Mokrinskiy). Founder of the Dormition Dolmatovsky Monastery (Dalmatovskoye Monastery), the first Russian settlement in the Urals. Canonized in 1994. See: (in Russian) Далмат Исетский.) (see also: June 10 - Synaxis of All Saints of Siberia)
- New martyr John of Thessaloniki (1776)
- Venerable Jefimija of Devic Monastery (Euphemia), known as "Blessed Stojna" (Zarić), Serbia (1895)
- Venerable Anthimos (Vagianos) of Chios (1960) (see also: February 2)

=== New martyrs and confessors ===
- New Hieromartyrs Michael Pyatayev and John Kuminov, Priests of Omsk (1930)
- New Hieromartyr Paul (Kozlov), Hieromonk of St. Nilus Hermitage, Tver (1938)
- New Hieromartyrs Nicholas Morkovin, Alexis, and Alexis, Priests; and Simeon, Deacon (1938)
- Virgin-martyr Sophia (1938)

== Other commemorations ==
- Synaxis of the Church of St. John the Theologian at Diaconissa. (Note: This church was located in Constantinople and is most likely the building presently known as the Kalenderhane Mosque, which has been referred to as St. Mary Diaconissa.)
- Synaxis of the Icon of the Mother of God of Vilnius.
- Synaxis of Icon of the Mother of God of Dalmatia. (Note: The Dalmatian Icon of the Dormition of the Most Holy Theotokos is from the Dormition-Dalmatov Monastery in the Province of Perm.)
- Repose of Schema-monk Nikodim of Karoulia (1984)
- Repose of Monk Marcu (Dumitrescu) of Sihastria (ro), Romania (1999)

== Icon gallery ==
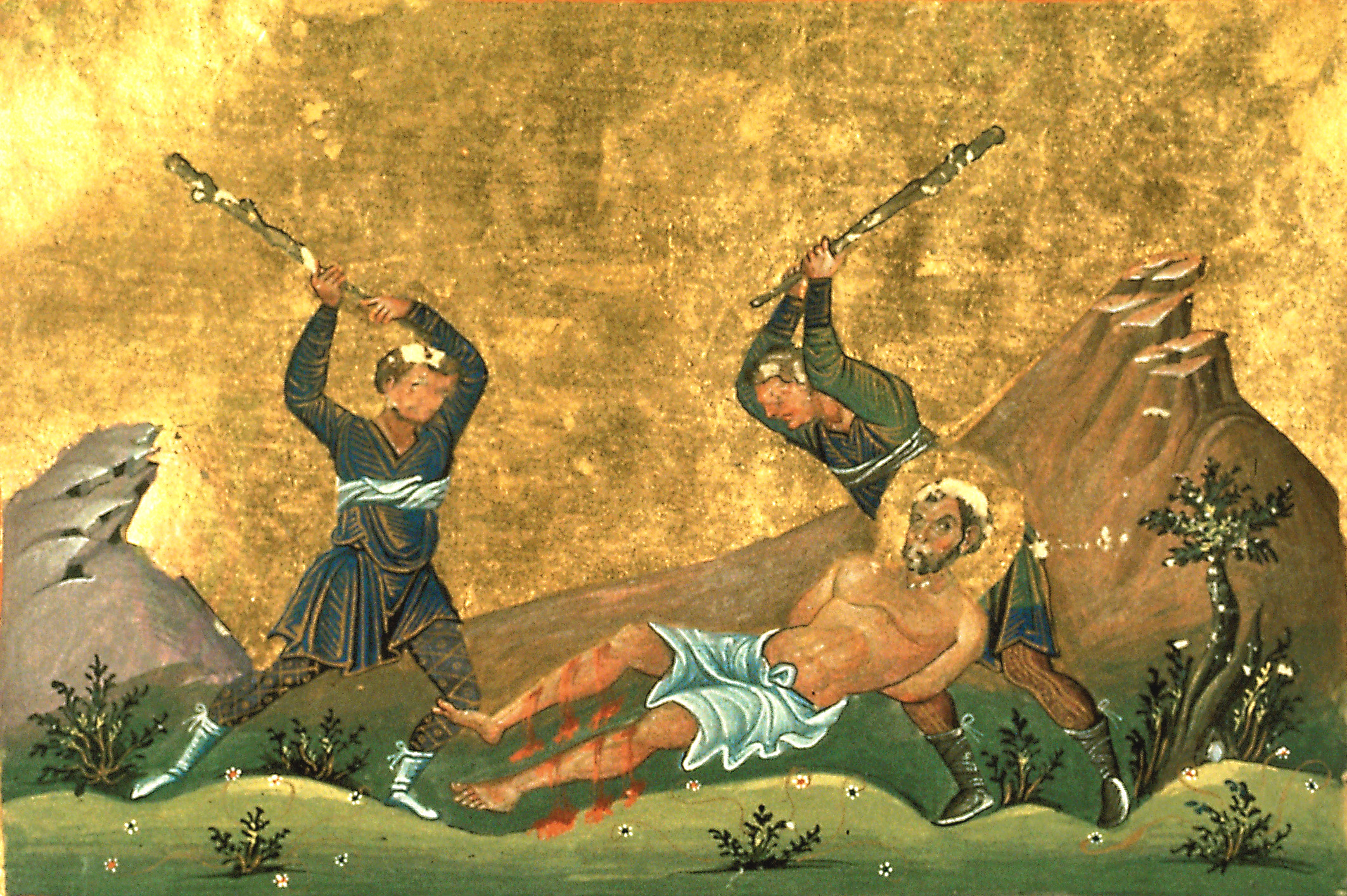
Martyrdom of Onesimus.

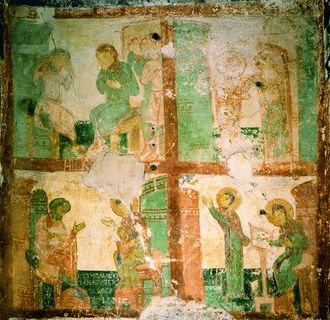
St. Euphrosyne of Alexandria.

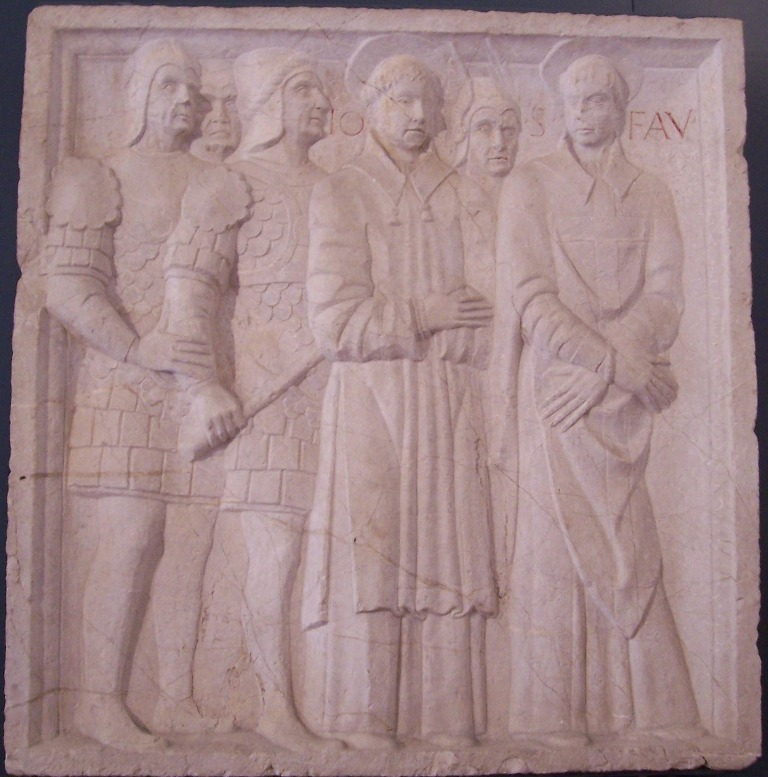
Martyrdom of Saints Faustinus and Jovita.

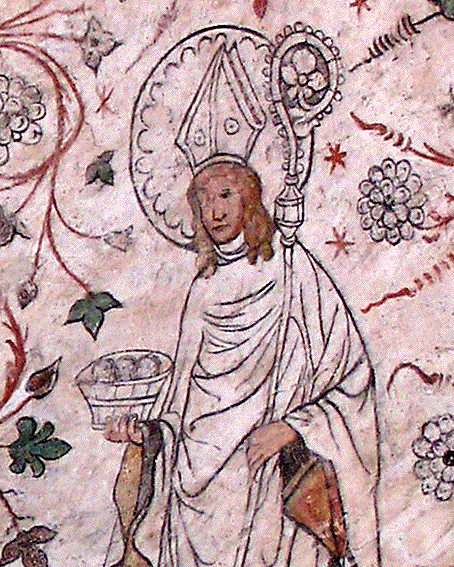
Saint Sigfrid of Sweden.

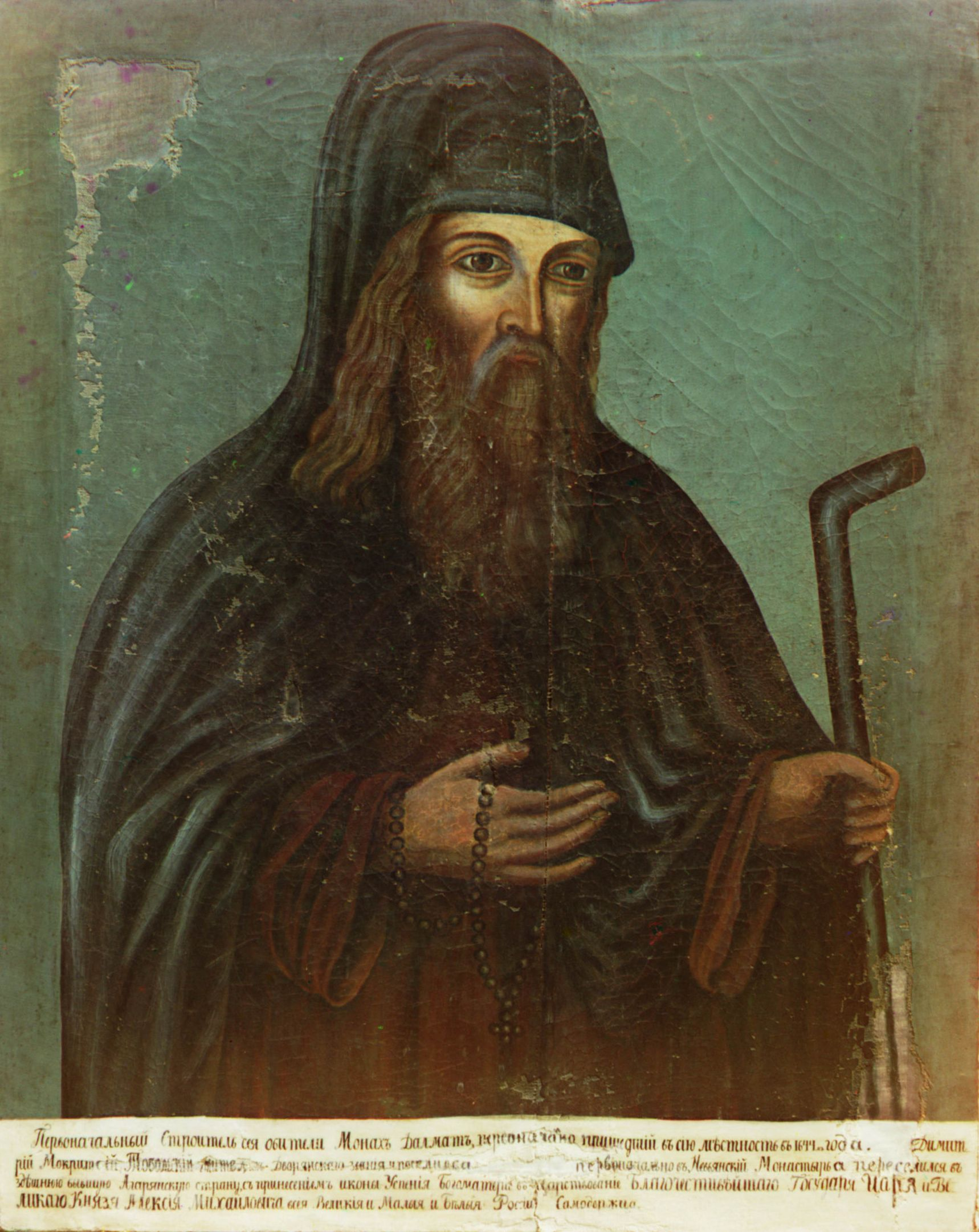
Venerable Dalmatius of Siberia.

== Sources ==
- February 15 / 28. Orthodox Calendar (Pravoslavie.ru).
- February 28 / 15. Holy Trinity Russian Orthodox Church (A parish of the Patriarchate of Moscow).
- February 15. OCA - The Lives of the Saints.
- The Autonomous Orthodox Metropolia of Western Europe and the Americas. St. Hilarion Calendar of Saints for the year of our Lord 2004. St. Hilarion Press (Austin, TX). p. 15.
- The Fifteenth Day of the Month of February. Orthodoxy in China.
- February 15. Latin Saints of the Orthodox Patriarchate of Rome.
- The Roman Martyrology. Transl. by the Archbishop of Baltimore. Last Edition, According to the Copy Printed at Rome in 1914. Revised Edition, with the Imprimatur of His Eminence Cardinal Gibbons. Baltimore: John Murphy Company, 1916. pp. 48-49.
- Rev. Richard Stanton. A Menology of England and Wales, or, Brief Memorials of the Ancient British and English Saints Arranged According to the Calendar, Together with the Martyrs of the 16th and 17th Centuries. London: Burns & Oates, 1892. pp. 69-72.

Greek Sources

- Great Synaxaristes: (in Greek) 15 Φεβρουαρίου. Μεγασ Συναξαριστησ.
- (in Greek) Συναξαριστής. 15 Φεβρουαρίου. Ecclesia.gr. (H Εκκλησια Τησ Ελλαδοσ).

Russian Sources

- (in Russian) 28 февраля (15 февраля). Православная Энциклопедия под редакцией Патриарха Московского и всея Руси Кирилла (электронная версия). (Orthodox Encyclopedia - Pravenc.ru).
