= February 3 (Eastern Orthodox liturgics) =

Day in the Eastern Orthodox liturgical calendar

Eastern Orthodox liturgical calendar
| February 2 | February 3 | February 4 |
February 3 O.S. ≍ February 16 N.S. February 3 N.S ≍ January 21 O.S.

An Eastern Orthodox cross

February 3 in Eastern Orthodox liturgical calendars is a feast day and a day of commemoration of saints and martyrs. Although some Orthodox churches use the Revised Julian Calendar and others use the traditional Julian calendar, the fixed commemorations for their respective February 3 are broadly the same, no matter which calendar is used. (Note: Despite the dates being the same, the days to which they refer typically differ by 13 days. The notation Old Style or O.S. is sometimes used to indicate a date in the traditional Julian Calendar (the "Old Calendar"). The notation New Style or N.S, indicates a date in the Revised Julian calendar (the "New Calendar").)

== Feasts ==
- Afterfeast of the Meeting of Our Lord.

== Saints ==
- Prophet Azariah (10th century B.C.) (Note: The name Azariah means “whom God helps.” The holy prophet lived during King Asa’s reign (2 Chron. 15:1).)
- Holy and Righteous Symeon the God-receiver and Anna the Prophetess (1st century)
- Martyrs Papias, Diodorus, and Claudianus, at Perge in Pamphylia (250) (see also: October 25)
- Martyr Blaise of Caesarea in Cappadocia (3rd century)
- Martyrs Paul and Simon, by the sword.
- Martyr Paul the Syrian (284-305)
- Martyrs Adrian and Eubulus, at Caesarea in Cappadocia (c. 308-309)
- Venerable Claudius.
- Saint Laurence of Canterbury, the second Archbishop of Canterbury (619) (see also: February 2 - West)

== Pre-Schism Western saints ==
- Saint Celerinus the Martyr (c.250) (Note: Born in North Africa, he earned the title of martyr on account of the sufferings he endured under Decius during a visit to Rome. Freed, he returned to Carthage, where he was ordained deacon and later a church was dedicated to him.) (Note: "In Africa, St. Celerinus, deacon, who was kept nineteen days in prison loaded with fetters, and confessed Christ gloriously in the midst of afflictions. By overcoming the enemy with invincible constancy, he showed to others the road to victory.")
- Martyrs Laurentinus, Ignatius and Celerina, martyrs in North Africa (3rd century) (Note: Sts Laurentinus and Ignatius were uncles and St Celerina was an aunt of the deacon St Celerinus.) (Note: "Also, the holy martyrs, Laurentinus, and Ignatius, his uncles, and Celerina, his grandmother, who had been previously crowned with martyrdom. They are highly praised in an epistle of St. Cyprian.")
- Martyrs Felix, Symphronius (Sempronius), Hippolytus and Companions, a group of martyrs in North Africa.
- Saints Tigides (4th century) and Remedius (419), two bishops who succeeded one another as Bishops of Gap in France.
- Virgin-martyr Ia of Cornwall (Hia, Ives), a Cornish evangelist and martyr (450) (Note: Born in Ireland and the sister of St Ercus, she went to Cornwall with Sts Fingar, Piala and others and was martyred at the mouth of the River Hayle. The town of St Ives is called after her.)
- Saints Lupicinus and Felix, Bishop of Lyon in France (5th century)
- Saint Laurence the Illuminator (Lawrence of Spoleto), Bishop of Spoleto, then founder of Farfa Abbey (576) (Note: A Syrian driven by the Monophysite persecution to Italy, there he was ordained and founded a monastery near Spoleto. He was bishop for twenty years, but then founded the monastery of Farfa in the Sabine hills near Rome. St Laurence was renowned as a peacemaker. His title derives from his gift of healing blindness, both spiritual and physical.)
- Saint Philip of Vienne, Bishop of Vienne in France (c. 578)
- Saint Caellainn (Caoilfionn), a church in Roscommon in Ireland is dedicated to her (6th century?)
- Saint Hadelin of Dinant, founder of the monastery of Chelles, in Belgium (690) (Note: Born in Gascony in France, he followed St Remaclus to Solignac, Maastricht and Stavelot and founded the monastery of Chelles, also in Belgium. He lived as a hermit near Dinant on the Meuse.)
- Saint Werburga of Chester, Abbess (c. 700) (Note: Daughter of St Ermenhild and King Wulfhere of Mercia. She became a nun at Ely under St Etheldred (Audrey) and later founded three convents. She reposed at Trentham but her body was transferred to Chester, of which she is the patroness saint.)
- Saint Berlinda of Meerbeke (Berlindis, Bellaude), a niece of St Amandus, she became a nun at Moorsel near Alost in Belgium, and later an anchoress in Meerbeke (702)
- Saint Werburgh of Bardney, a widow who became a nun, probably at Bardney Abbey in England, where she later became Abbess (c. 785) (Note: "Werburg was the widow of Ceolred, the powerful King of Mercia, who died in the year 716. She afterwards retired to a monastery, of which she became the Abbess. Her life was prolonged many years, which she spent with such holiness, that the chronicler says it may well be believed that she went to live with Christ for ever. The day of her death is not known, but in a modern martyrology the 3rd of February is noted as her festival.")
- Saint Deodatus, a monk at Lagny Abbey in France (8th century)
- Saint Ansgar of Hamburg, Bishop of Hamburg, Enlightener of Denmark and Sweden, "Apostle of the North" (865) (Note: Born near Amiens in France, as a child he became a monk at Old Corbie in Picardy. He then went to New Corbie in Saxony, from where he was taken by King Harold of Denmark to enlighten the heathen Danes. He toiled there as Archbishop of Hamburg for thirteen years and his mission extended to Sweden, Norway and the north of Germany.) (Note: "The same day, St. Anscharius, bishop of Bremen, who converted the Swedes and the Danes to the faith of Christ.")
- Saint Anatolius, a bishop in Scotland, who went to Rome on pilgrimage and settled as a hermit in Salins in the Jura in France (9th century)
- Saint Liafdag, Bishop in Jutland in Denmark, martyred by pagans (c. 980) (Note: He became Bishop in Jutland in Denmark and met the needs of the growing number of Orthodox there but was martyred by pagans.)
- Saint Oliver of Ancona (Oliverius, Liberius), a monk at Santa Maria di Portonuovo in Ancona in Italy (c. 1050)

== Post-Schism Orthodox saints ==
- Saint Sviatoslav-Gabriel and his son Saint Dimitry, of Yuriev (1253)
- Saint Romanus of Uglich, Prince of Uglich (1285) (Note: See: (in Russian) Роман Владимирович (князь углицкий). Википедии. (Russian Wikipedia).)
- Saint Symeon of Tver, Bishop of Polotsk and Tver, first bishop there (1289) (Note: See: (in Russian) Симеон (епископ Тверской). Википедии. (Russian Wikipedia).)
- Saint James (Jakov I), Archbishop of Serbia (1292)
- Venerable Sabbas of Ioannina (15th century) (Note: His sacred relics are reverently kept at the Holy Holy Monastery of Rousanou (dedicated to the Transfiguration), at Meteora.)
- Saint Ignatius of Mariupol in the Crimea, Metropolitan of Gothia and Kafa (1786) (Note: This Greek bishop emigrated with his entire eparchy to Crimea to escape the relentless persecution of the Ottoman empire and was glorified a saint by the Ukrainian Orthodox Church (Moscow Patriarchate). (In 1778, on the orders of Catherine II, 18,000 Crimean Greeks, tired of living under Ottoman rule, successfully petitioned the empress for permission to move to Russia, and were allowed to settle on the shores of the Sea of Azov, where they founded the city of Mariupol (Marianopolis).)) (Note: See: (in Ukrainian) Ігнатій Маріупольський Готфейсько-Кафайський. Вікіпедії. (Ukrainian Wikipedia).)
- New Martyrs Stamatius and John, brothers, and their companion Nicholas, of Spetses, at Chios (1822)
- Saint Nicholas of Japan, Equal-to-the-Apostles, Enlightener of Japan (1912) [with Saint Innocent, Metropolitan of Moscow, Enlightener of Siberia and Alaska (1879)]

=== New martyrs and confessors ===
- New Hieromartyr Vladimir (Zagreba), Hieromonk of Borisoglebsk Monastery, Novotorzhok (1938)
- New Hieromartyr Basil Zalessky, Archpriest, of Astrakhan (1938)
- New Hieromartyr Adrian Troitsky, Archpriest, of Kazan (1938)
- New Hieromartyrs John Tomilov, Timothy Izotov, Priests (1938)
- Martyr Michael Agayev (1938)

== Other commemorations ==
- Repose of Schemamonk Paul of Simonov Monastery (1825), disciple of St. Paisius (Velichkovsky).
- Repose of Hieromonk Isidore of Gethsemane Skete in Moscow (1908)

== Icon gallery ==
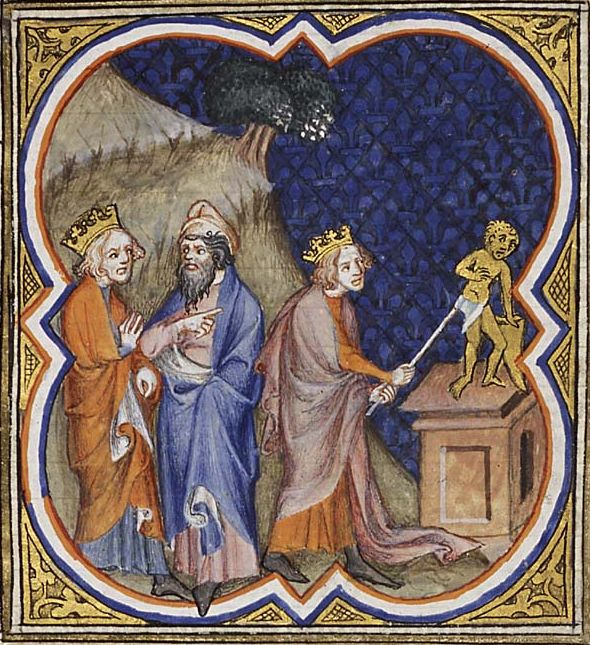
Illustration in the Bible Historiale of King Asa of Judah destroying the idols, at Azariah's instigation.

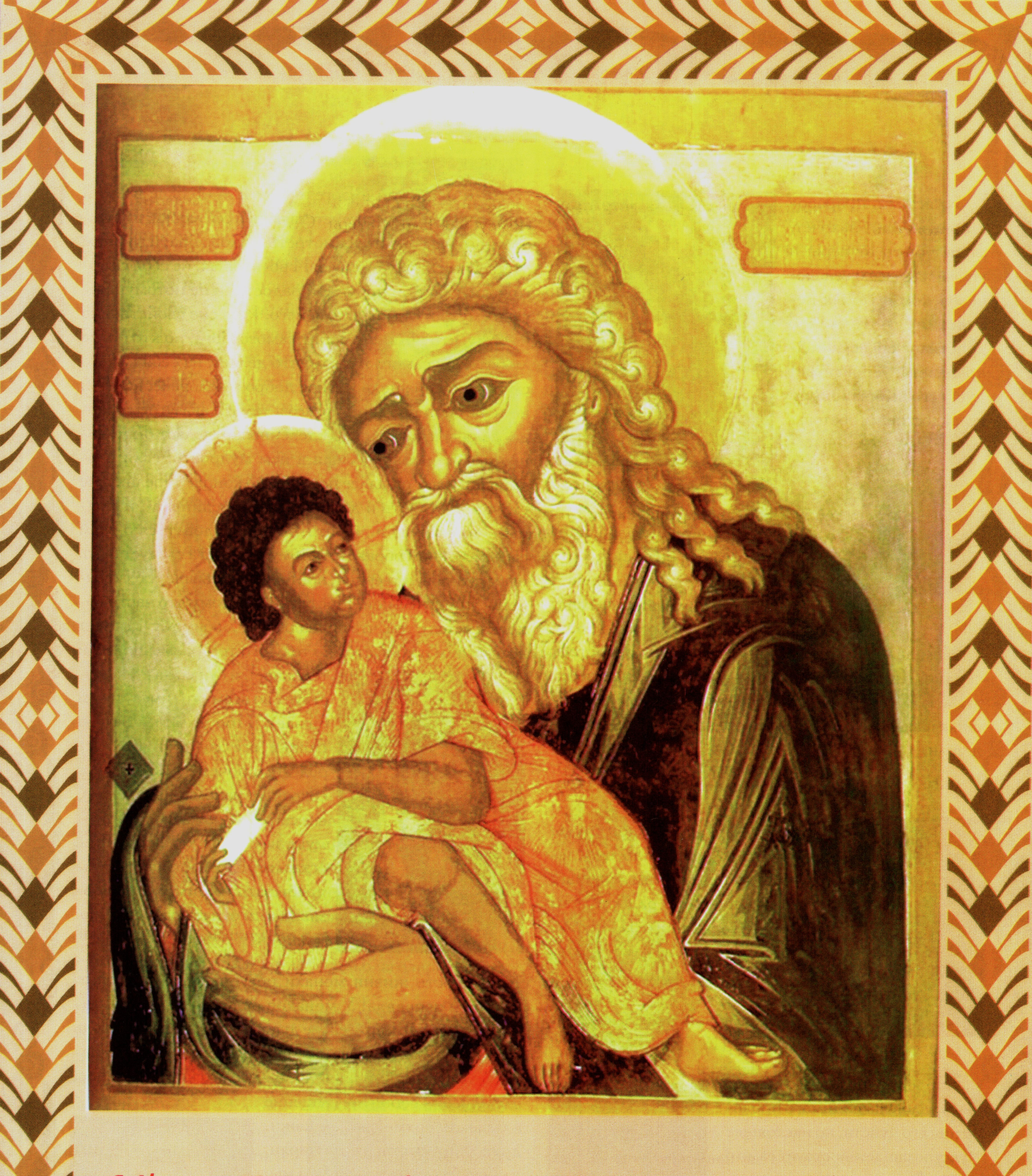
Righteous Symeon the God-receiver.

Holy and Righteous Symeon the God-receiver and Anna the Prophetess.
(Menologion of Basil II, 10th century).

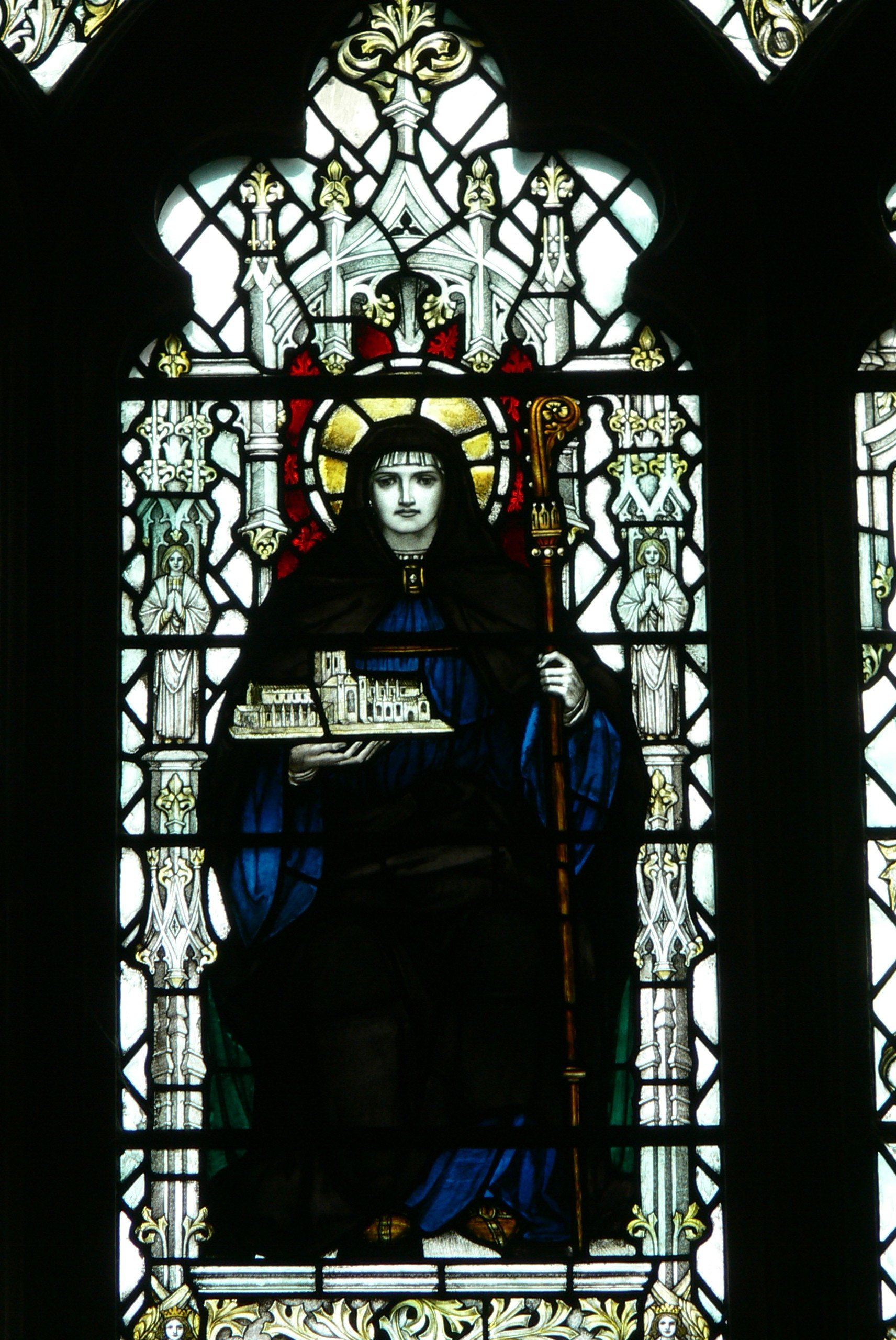
Saint Werburga of Chester.

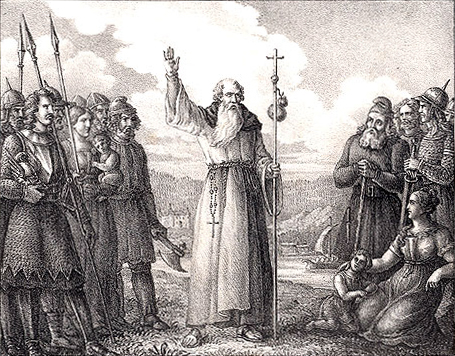
Saint Ansgar, Bishop of Hamburg, Enlightener of Denmark and Sweden, "Apostle of the North".

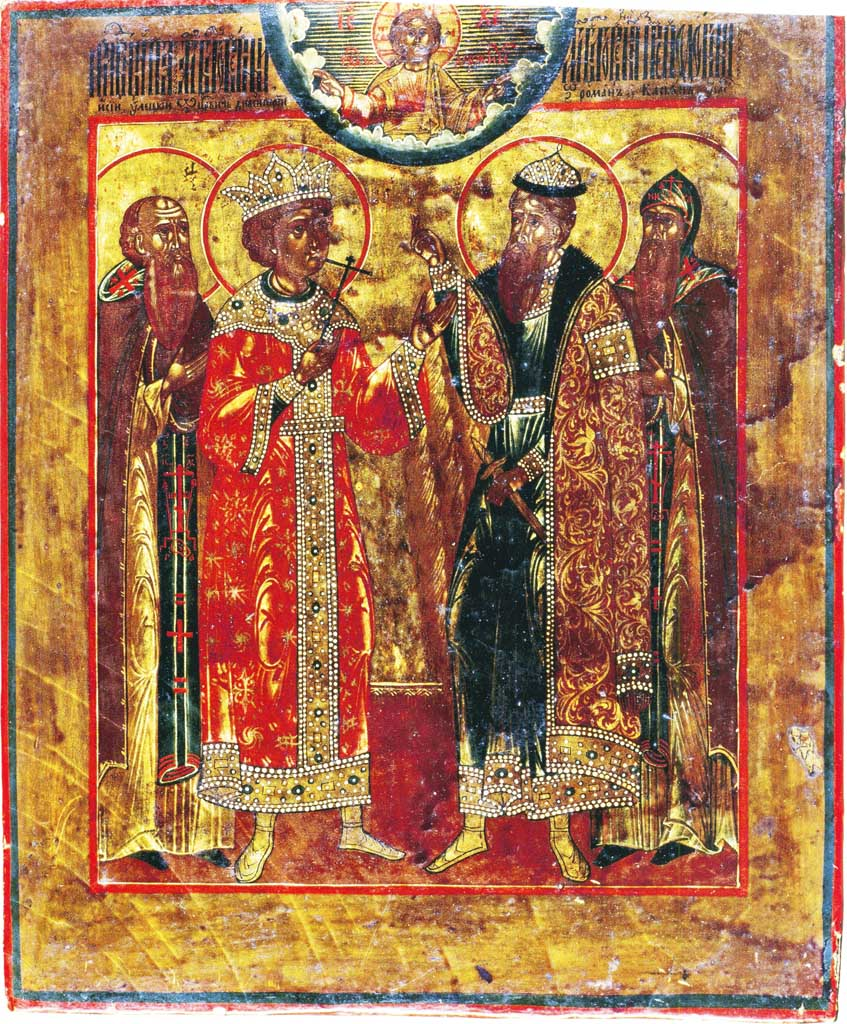
Saints of Uglich, including St. Romanus of Uglich (second from right).

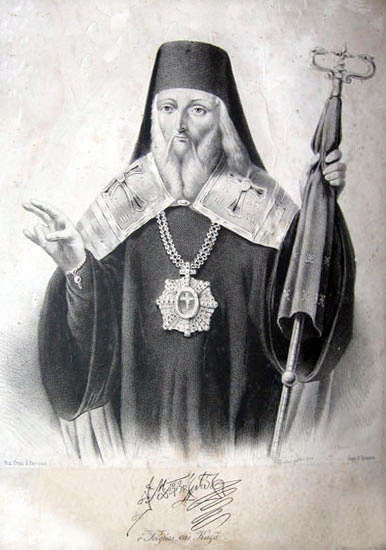
Saint Ignatius of Mariupol in the Crimea, Metropolitan of Gothia and Kafa.

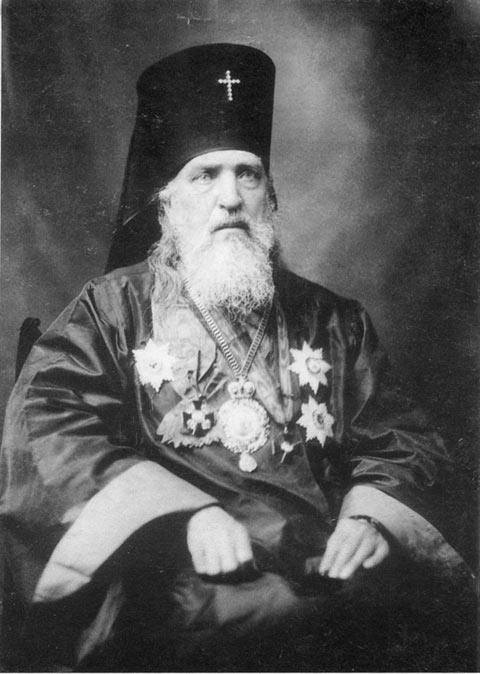
Saint Nicholas of Japan, Equal-to-the-Apostles, Enlightener of Japan.

== Sources ==
- February 3 / 16. Orthodox Calendar (Pravoslavie.ru).
- February 16 / 3. Holy Trinity Russian Orthodox Church (A parish of the Patriarchate of Moscow).
- February 3. OCA - The Lives of the Saints.
- The Autonomous Orthodox Metropolia of Western Europe and the Americas. St. Hilarion Calendar of Saints for the year of our Lord 2004. St. Hilarion Press (Austin, TX). p. 12.
- The Third Day of the Month of February. Orthodoxy in China.
- February 3. Latin Saints of the Orthodox Patriarchate of Rome.
- The Roman Martyrology. Transl. by the Archbishop of Baltimore. Last Edition, According to the Copy Printed at Rome in 1914. Revised Edition, with the Imprimatur of His Eminence Cardinal Gibbons. Baltimore: John Murphy Company, 1916. pp. 36–37.
- Rev. Richard Stanton. A Menology of England and Wales, or, Brief Memorials of the Ancient British and English Saints Arranged According to the Calendar, Together with the Martyrs of the 16th and 17th Centuries. London: Burns & Oates, 1892. pp. 48-50.

Greek Sources

- Great Synaxaristes: (in Greek) 3 Φεβρουαρίου. Μεγασ Συναξαριστησ.
- (in Greek) Συναξαριστής. 3 Φεβρουαρίου. Ecclesia.gr. (H Εκκλησια Τησ Ελλαδοσ).

Russian Sources

- (in Russian) 16 февраля (3 февраля). Православная Энциклопедия под редакцией Патриарха Московского и всея Руси Кирилла (электронная версия). (Orthodox Encyclopedia - Pravenc.ru).
- (in Russian) 3 февраля по старому стилю / 16 февраля по новому стилю. Русская Православная Церковь - Православный церковный календарь на 2018 год.
