= January 21 (Eastern Orthodox liturgics) =

Day in the Eastern Orthodox liturgical calendar

Eastern Orthodox liturgical calendar
January 20	January 21	January 22
January 21 O.S. ≍ February 3 N.S. January 21 N.S ≍ January 8 O.S.

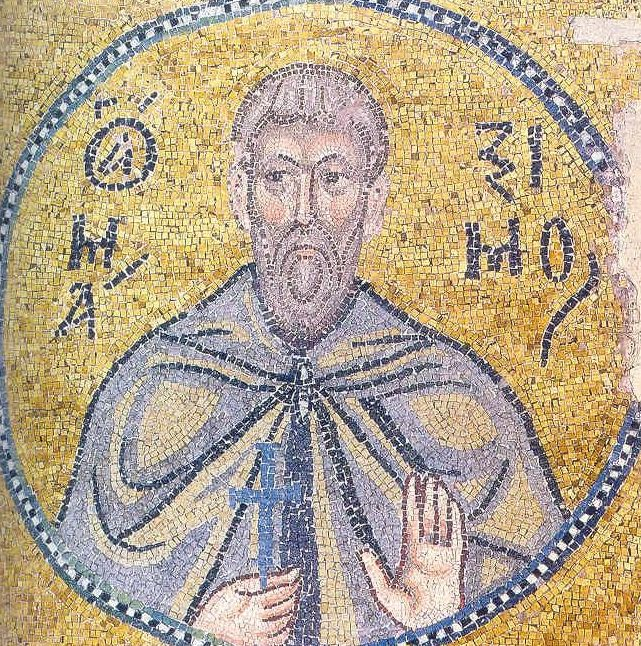
Mosaic of St. Maximus the Confessor. (Nea Moni, 11th century).

January 21 in Eastern Orthodox liturgical calendars is a feast day and a day of commemoration of saints and martyrs. Although some Orthodox churches use the Revised Julian Calendar and others use the traditional Julian calendar, the fixed commemorations for their respective January 21 are broadly the same, no matter which calendar is used. (Note: Despite the dates being the same, the days to which they refer typically differ by 13 days. The notation Old Style or O.S. is sometimes used to indicate a date in the traditional Julian Calendar (the "Old Calendar"). The notation New Style or N.S, indicates a date in the Revised Julian calendar (the "New Calendar").)

== Saints ==
- Martyrs Eugenios (Eugene), Candidus, Valerian, and Aquila, at Trebizond (303)
- Virgin Martyr Agnes of Rome (c. 304) (Note: "AT Rome, the passion of St. Agnes, virgin, who under Symphronius, governor of the city, was thrown into the fire, but as it was extinguished by her prayers, she was struck with the sword. Of her, St. Jerome writes: "Agnes is praised in the writings and by the tongues of all nations, especially in the churches. She overcame the weakness of her age, conquered the cruelty of the tyrant, and consecrated her chastity by martyrdom.")
- Martyr Neophytus of Nicaea (305)
- The Holy Four Martyrs of Tyre, by the sword.
- Venerable Apollonios of the Thebaid, ascetic (4th century) (see also: March 31)
- Venerable Maximus the Confessor (662)
- Martyr Anastasius (662), disciple of Venerable Maximus the Confessor.
- Saint Zosimas, Bishop of Syracuse (662) (see also: March 30)
- Martyrs Gabriel and Zionios, and companions, under the Bulgarian ruler Omurtag (c. 814-831)

== Pre-Schism Western saints ==
- Saint Publius, first Bishop of Malta and later Bishop of Athens, martyred under Trajan (c. 112, or, c. 161-180) (Note: "At Athens, the birthday of St. Publius, bishop, who, as successor of St. Denis the Areopagite, nobly governed the Church of Athens. No less celebrated for the lustre of his virtues than for the brilliancy of his learning, he was gloriously crowned for having borne testimony to Christ.") (see also: March 13 - East)
- Hieromartyr Fructuosus, Bishop of Tarragona, Spain, and his deacons Augurius and Eulogius (259) (Note: Fructuosus, Bishop of Tarragoña in Spain, and his two deacons, Augurius and Eulogius, were burnt at the stake under Valerian. When the fire had burnt through their bonds, they stretched out their arms in the form of a cross and died.)
- Martyr Patroclus of Troyes, under Aurelian (c. 270-275) (Note: A very wealthy and exceedingly charitable Orthodox in Troyes in France, who was martyred there. His relics were translated to Soest in Germany in 960.)
- Saint Epiphanius of Pavia, Bishop of Pavia (496)
- Saint Brigid (Briga) of Kilbride, venerated around Lismore, Ireland (6th century)
- Saint Lawdog (6th century) (Note: "In South Wales, the festival of ST. LAWDOG, to whom are dedicated several churches in the diocese of ST. DAVID'S, and whose memory is marked on this day in an ancient Welsh Calendar." Four churches are dedicated to him near St. David's in Wales.)
- Saint Vimin (Wynnin, Gwynnin), a Bishop in Scotland, said to have founded the monastery of Holywood (6th century)
- Saint Meinrad of Einsiedeln, hermit, martyred by robbers (861) (Note: Of the noble family of Hohenzollern, he became a monk at the monastery of Reichenau on the Rhine in Germany. Later he became a hermit in Switzerland, and this later became the monastery of Einsiedeln, meaning in German 'the Hermitage'. He lived as a hermit for twenty-five years, was murdered by robbers and is venerated as a martyr.)
- Saint Maccallin (Macallan), Abbot of Saint-Michel-en-Thiérache Abbey and Waulsort (978) (Note: Born in Ireland, he went to St. Fursey's shrine in Péronne in France and entered the monastery of Gorze. Later he became a hermit and then Abbot of Saint Michael's monastery at Thiérache and Waulsort near Dinant in Belgium.)

== Post-Schism Orthodox saints ==
- Saint Neophytus of Vatopedi Monastery, Mount Athos (14th century)(see also: January 20)
- Venerable Maximus the Greek of Russia (1556)
- Venerable Timon, Hieromonk of Nadeyev and Kostroma (1840)
- Saint George (John) Mkheidze of Georgia (1960) (Note: See September 21 for Archimandrite John (Basil Maisuradze) († 1957).)

=== New martyrs and confessors ===
- New Hieromartyr Elias Berezovsky, Priest of Alma-Ata (1938)

== Other commemorations ==
- Synaxis of All the Martyred Saints, from Protomartyr Stephen up to the present. (Note: This commemoration is celebrated today according to the Typikon of the Patriarchate of Jerusalem. The Synaxis takes place at the Church of Saint Stephen in Jerusalem, which was founded by Empress Aelia Eudocia circa 460 AD, wife of Theodosius II.) (Note: (in Greek) "Πάντων των αγίων Μαρτύρων, «οίτινες εμαρτύρησαν από του χρόνου του Στεφάνου μέχρι της παρούσης ημέρας».")
- Synaxis of the Church of Holy Peace (Saint Irene) by the Sea in Constantinople.

=== Icons ===
- "Paramythia" Icon of the Most Holy Theotokos (Vatopedi Mother of Consolation, Mother of God of Vatopedi), at Vatopedi Monastery, Mount Athos (807)
- Icon of the Mother of God "Stabbed" (Greek: "Esphagmeni." Slavonic: "Zaklannaya"), at Vatopedi monastery (14th century)
- Icon of the Mother of God "Xenophon Hodegetria" (1730)

== Icon gallery ==
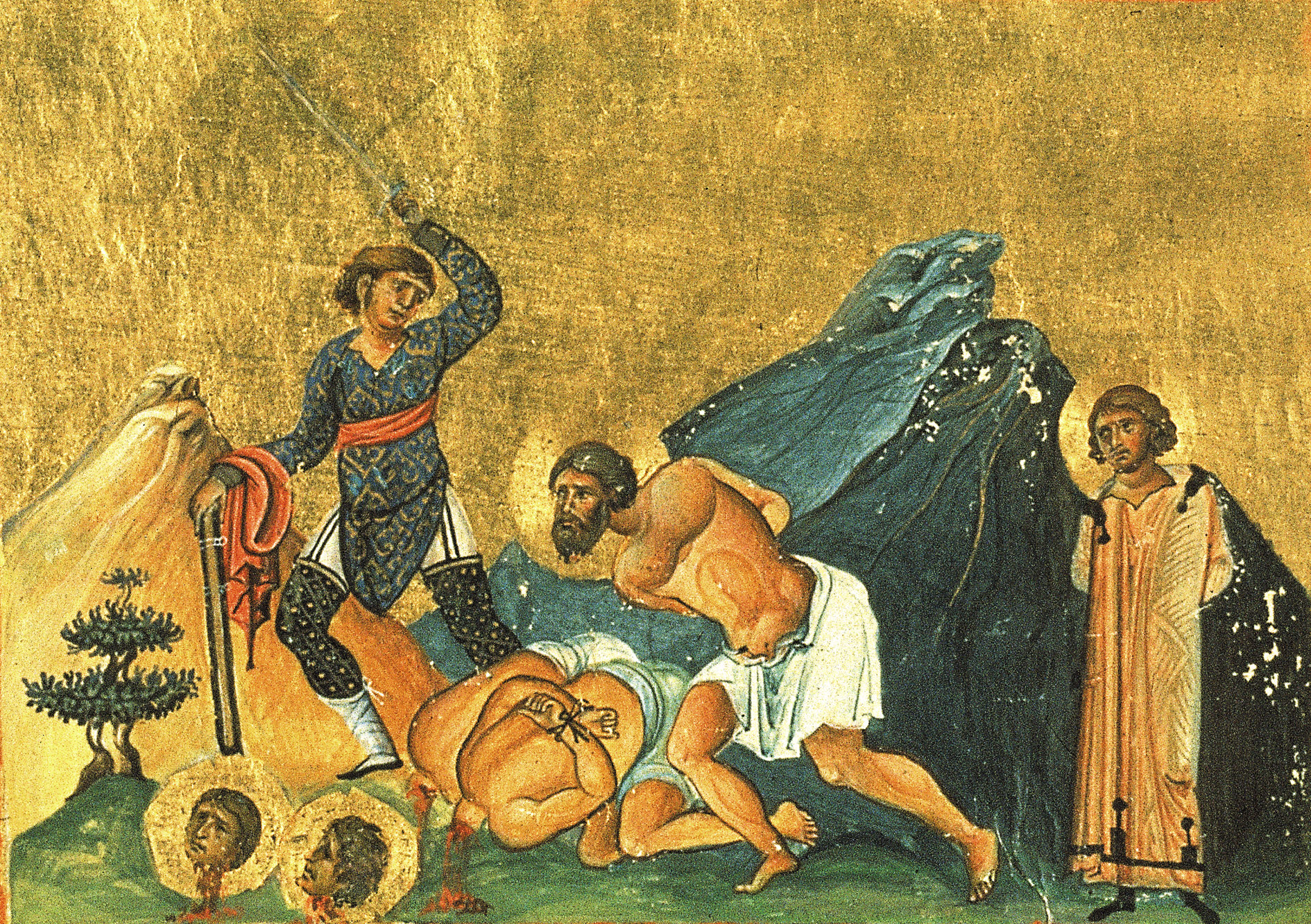
Aquila, Valerian, Eugene and Candidus of Trebizond.
(Menologion of Basil II, 10th century).

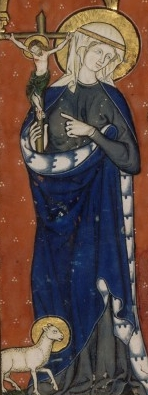
St. Agnes of Rome with a white lamb and a crucifix.
(13th century).

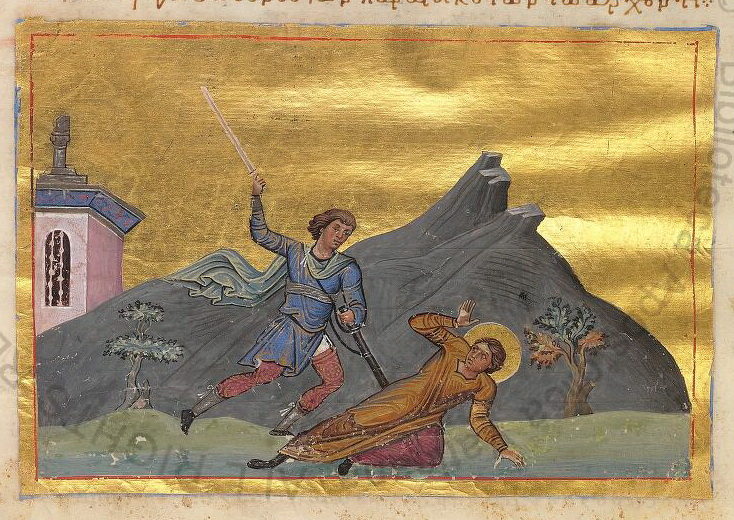
Martyr Neophytos of Nicaea.
(Menologion of Basil II, 10th century).

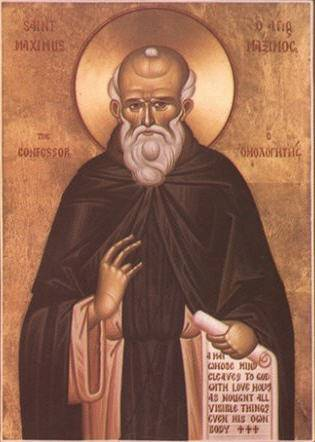
Venerable Maximus the Confessor.

St. Zosimas, Bishop of Syracuse.
(Menologion of Basil II, 10th century).

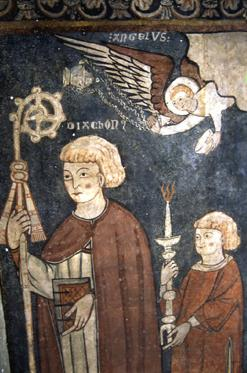
Detail of a Romanesque mural of Saint Fructuosus.

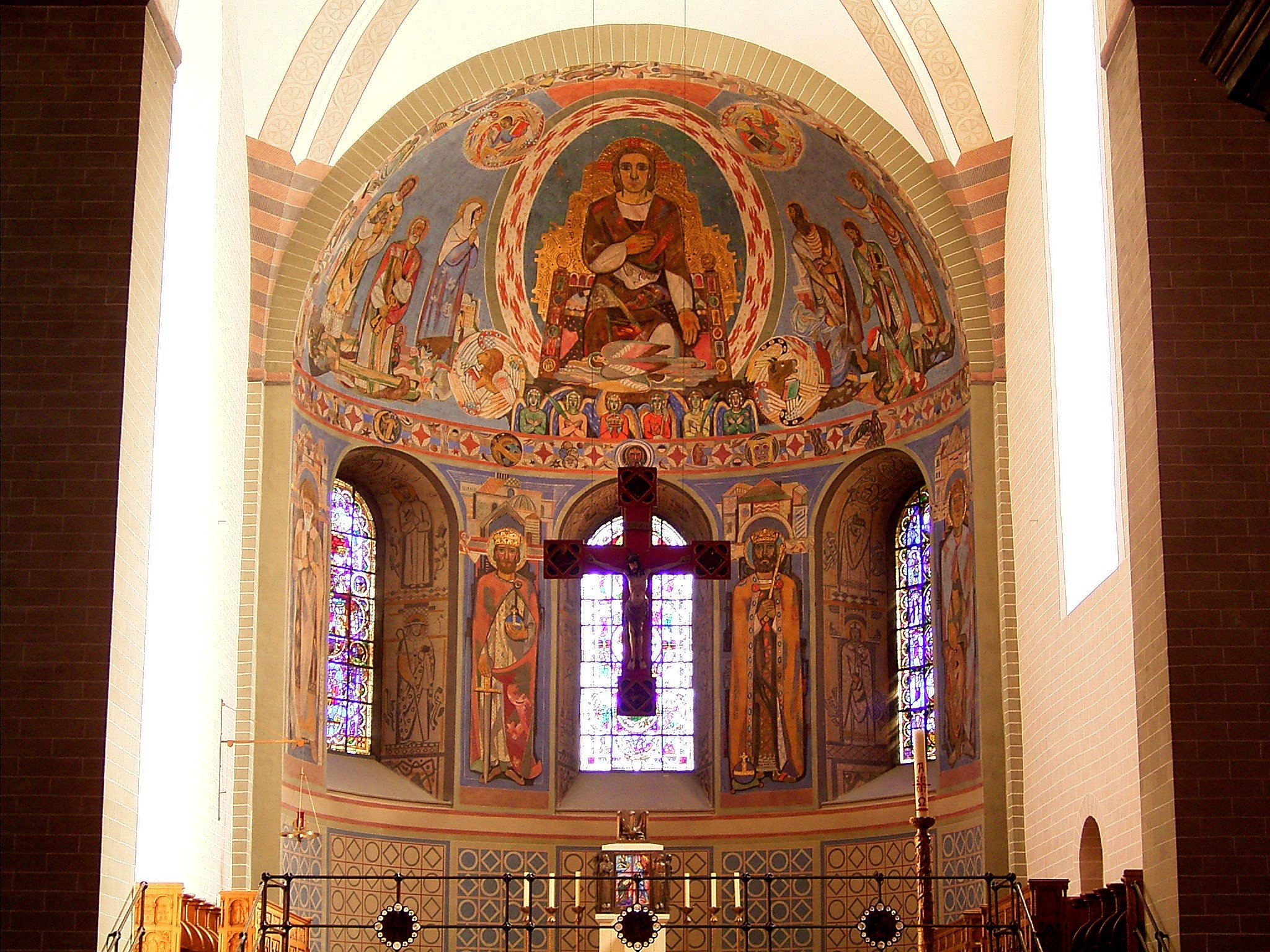
Apse of St. Patroclus' Cathedral in Soest.

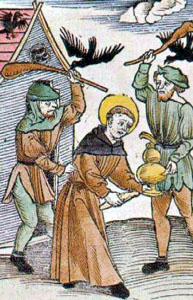
St. Meinrad of Einsiedeln, hermit, martyred by robbers.

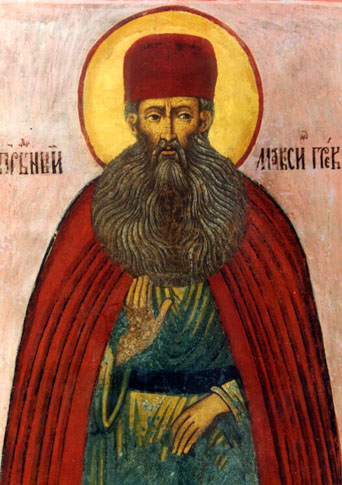
Venerable Maximus the Greek of Russia.

St. Timon, Hieromonk of Nadeyev and Kostroma.

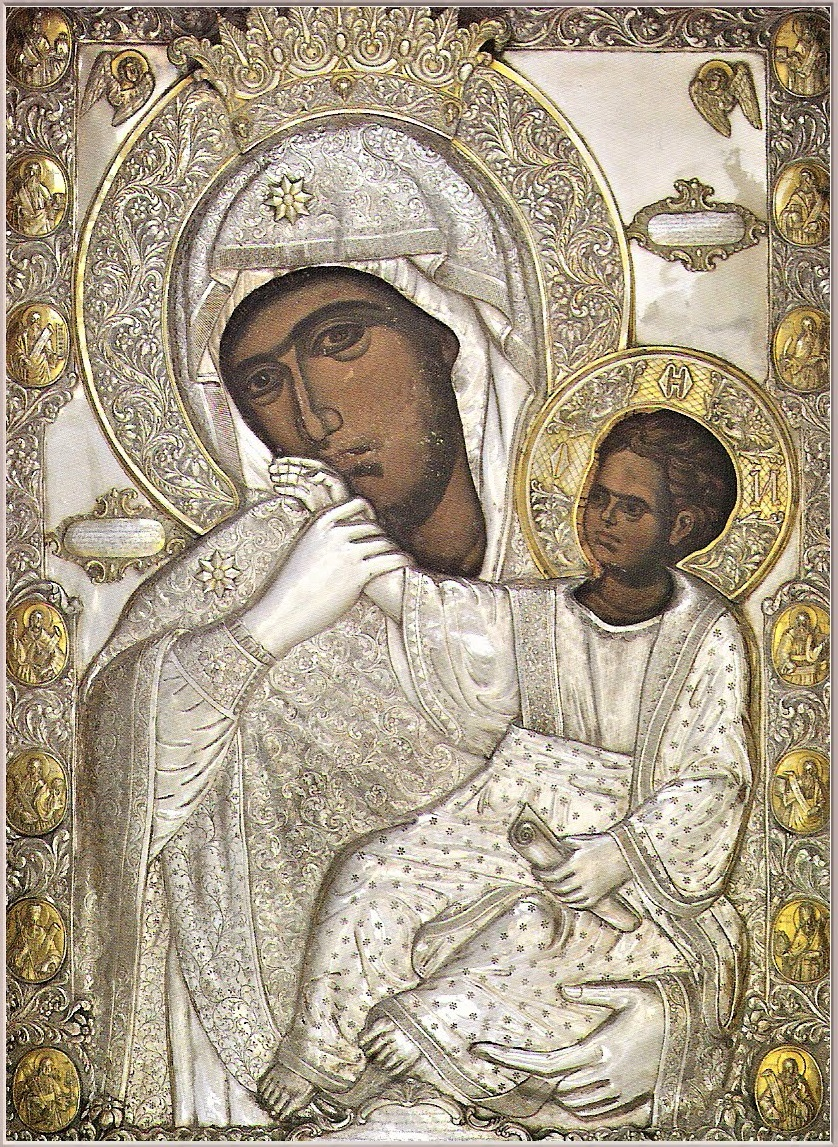
Panagia Paramythia Icon from Vatopedi Monastery.
(14th Century).

== Sources ==
- January 21 / February 3. Orthodox Calendar (PRAVOSLAVIE.RU).
- February 3 / January 21. HOLY TRINITY RUSSIAN ORTHODOX CHURCH (A parish of the Patriarchate of Moscow).
- January 21. OCA - The Lives of the Saints.
- The Autonomous Orthodox Metropolia of Western Europe and the Americas (ROCOR). St. Hilarion Calendar of Saints for the year of our Lord 2004. St. Hilarion Press (Austin, TX). p. 9.
- January 21. Latin Saints of the Orthodox Patriarchate of Rome.
- The Roman Martyrology. Transl. by the Archbishop of Baltimore. Last Edition, According to the Copy Printed at Rome in 1914. Revised Edition, with the Imprimatur of His Eminence Cardinal Gibbons. Baltimore: John Murphy Company, 1916. pp. 21–22.
- Rev. Richard Stanton. A Menology of England and Wales, or, Brief Memorials of the Ancient British and English Saints Arranged According to the Calendar, Together with the Martyrs of the 16th and 17th Centuries. London: Burns & Oates, 1892. pp. 28–31.

Greek Sources

- Great Synaxaristes: (in Greek) 21 ΙΑΝΟΥΑΡΙΟΥ. ΜΕΓΑΣ ΣΥΝΑΞΑΡΙΣΤΗΣ.
- (in Greek) Συναξαριστής. 21 Ιανουαρίου. ECCLESIA.GR. (H ΕΚΚΛΗΣΙΑ ΤΗΣ ΕΛΛΑΔΟΣ).

Russian Sources

- (in Russian) 3 февраля (21 января). Православная Энциклопедия под редакцией Патриарха Московского и всея Руси Кирилла (электронная версия). (Orthodox Encyclopedia - Pravenc.ru).
- (in Russian) 21 января (ст.ст.) 3 февраля 2014 (нов. ст.). Русская Православная Церковь Отдел внешних церковных связей. (DECR).
