= January 20 (Eastern Orthodox liturgics) =

Day in the Eastern Orthodox liturgical calendar

Eastern Orthodox liturgical calendar
January 19	January 20	January 21
January 20 O.S. ≍ February 2 N.S. January 20 N.S ≍ January 7 O.S.

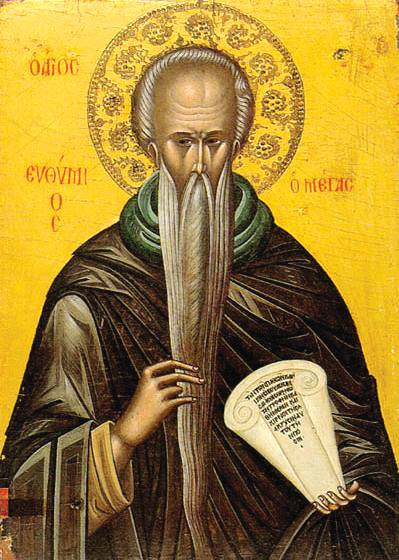
St. Euthymius the Great.

January 20 in Eastern Orthodox liturgical calendars is a feast day and a day of commemoration of saints and martyrs. Although some Orthodox churches use the Revised Julian Calendar and others use the traditional Julian calendar, the fixed commemorations for their respective January 20 are broadly the same, no matter which calendar is used. (Note: Despite the dates being the same, the days to which they refer typically differ by 13 days. The notation Old Style or O.S. is sometimes used to indicate a date in the traditional Julian Calendar (the "Old Calendar"). The notation New Style or N.S, indicates a date in the Revised Julian calendar (the "New Calendar").)

== Saints ==
- Martyrs Inna, Pinna, and Rimma, disciples of the Apostle Andrew in Scythia (1st-2nd century) (see also: June 20 - Translation)
- Martyr Eusebius (298) (Note: Martyr Eusebius lived during the reign of Diocletian (284-305 AD) and was a courtier of the Senate. He converted to Christianity during the witness of Bishop Theopemptus in Rome († 5 January), when he saw the spiritual prowess of that Saint during his tortures, and the miracles that he performed. Because he became a Christian he was arrested and led before the Emperor, where he confessed his faith in Christ. He was martyred with horrible tortures and was partitioned with an axe in the year 298 AD.)
- Martyrs Bassus, Eusebius, Eutychius, and Basilides, at Nicomedia (303)
- Venerable Euthymius the Great (473) (Note: Name days celebrated today include: Euthymius, Evthymios (Εὐθύμιος); Euthymia, Evthymia (Εὐθυμία).)
- Saint Leo I, Eastern Roman Emperor and Confessor (474) (Note: The Life-giving Spring of the Mother of God was revealed to Leo on April 4, 450. Leo later became Byzantine Emperor Leo I (457-474).)
- Martyrs Thyrsus and Agnes (5th century) (Note: (in Greek) Εἶναι ἄγνωστο ποῦ καὶ πότε μαρτύρησαν οἱ Ἅγιοι Θύσρος καὶ Ἁγνή. Ἡ Σύναξη αὐτῶν ἐτελεῖτο πλησίον τῶν Ἐλενιανῶν, μεταξὺ τῶν Ὑψωμαθείων καὶ τοῦ Ξηρολόφου Κωνσταντινουπόλεως.)
- Saint Peter the Publican (Tax Collector, Customs Inspector) of Constantinople (c. 527-565)

== Pre-Schism Western saints ==
- Martyr Anna at Rome.
- Saint Fabian, Pope of Rome (250) (Note: Fabian succeeded St. Antherus as Pope of Rome in 236 and was martyred in 250 under Decius. St. Cyprian described him as an 'incomparable man' and added that the glory of his death matched the purity and goodness of his life.)
- Saint Sebastian, one of the most renowned of all the martyrs of Rome (c. 288) (Note: According to his Life, he was an officer in the imperial army and a favourite of Diocletian. Nevertheless, when he was discovered to be Orthodox no mercy was shown him. Tied to a tree, his body was made a target for Roman archers and he was finally martyred with clubs. His church is one of the seven main churches in Rome.)
- Saint Molagga (Molacus, Laicin), disciple of Saint David in Wales, founded a monastery in Fulachmhin (Fermoy), Ireland (655)
- Saint Féchín (Fechinus), founded Fore Abbey at Meath (665) (Note: Born in Connaught in Ireland, he founded several monasteries. His name is connected with Fobhar (Fore) in Westmeath. Ecclefechan and St. Vigean's near Arbroath in Scotland are also called after him.)
- Saint Maurus, monk and Abbot of Classe in Ravenna (Basilica of Sant'Apollinare in Classe), and finally Bishop of Cesena (946)

== Post-Schism Orthodox saints ==
- Venerable Laurence the Recluse of the Kiev Caves (13th-14th century)
- Venerable Euthymius the Silent, Schemamonk of the Kiev Caves (14th century) (Note: See: (in Russian) Евфимий Печерский. Википедии. (Russian Wikipedia).)
- Saint Neophytus of Vatopedi, Mount Athos (14th century) (see also: January 21)
- Saint Euthymius, Patriarch of Tarnovo (Turnovo, Trnovo) and Bulgaria (1402)
- Saint Euthymius of Syamzha (Syadem, Syandema, Syandemsk, Syandemsky, Syanzhema, Syanzhemsk), Vologda Oblast (1470)
- Venerable Euthymius of Arkhangelsk (1523)
- Venerable Feodor (Theodore) Kuzmich of Tomsk (1864)

=== New martyrs and confessors ===
- New Martyr Zachariah (Zacharias) of Patras, Morea (1782)
- New Hieromartyr Ioan Pettai, Estonian Martyr Presbyter. (Note: Hieromartyr Ioan Pettai was canonized by the Ecumenical Patriarchate in 2004. He is a Saint of the Estonian Apostolic Orthodox Church.)
- New Hieromartyr Paul Dobromyslov, Archpriest of Ryazan (1940)
- Venerable New Confessor Ekvtime (Euthymius) Kereselidze of Georgia (1944) (Note: See also: (in Georgian) ექვთიმე აღმსარებელი (კერესელიძე). (Georgian Wikipedia).; (in Russian) Евфимий Исповедник (Кереселидзе). Википедии. (Russian Wikipedia).) (see also: February 2 - Greek)

== Other commemorations ==
- Repose of Elder Gerasim, founder of Ascension Monastery, Irkutsk (1676) (Note: See: (in Russian) Герасим (схимонах Иркутский). Википедии. (Russian Wikipedia).)

== Icon gallery ==
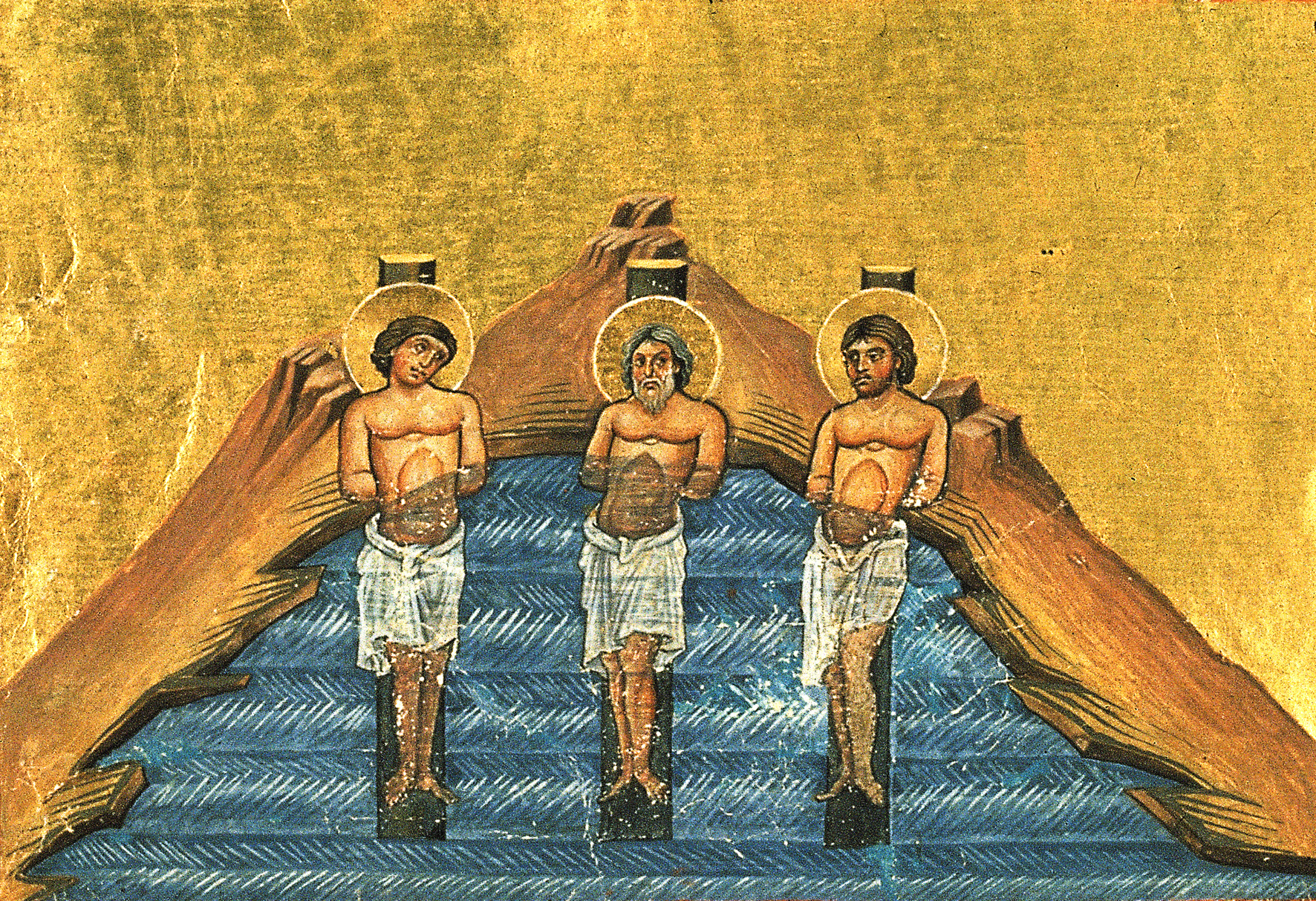
Martyrs Inna, Pinna, and Rimma.
(Menologion of Basil II, 10th century).

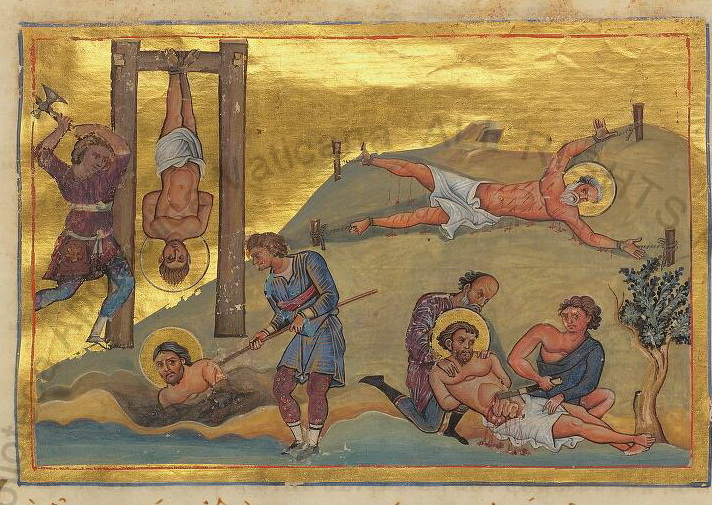
Martyrs Bassus, Eusebius, Eutychius, and Basilides.
(Menologion of Basil II, 10th century).

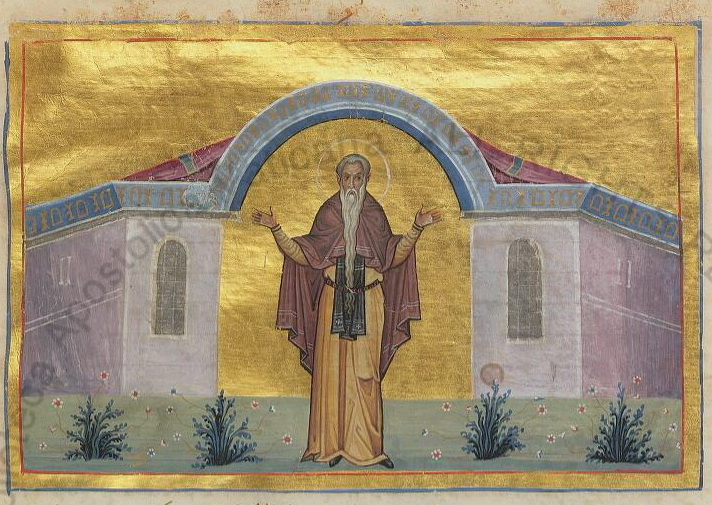
St. Euthymius the Great.
(Menologion of Basil II, 10th century).

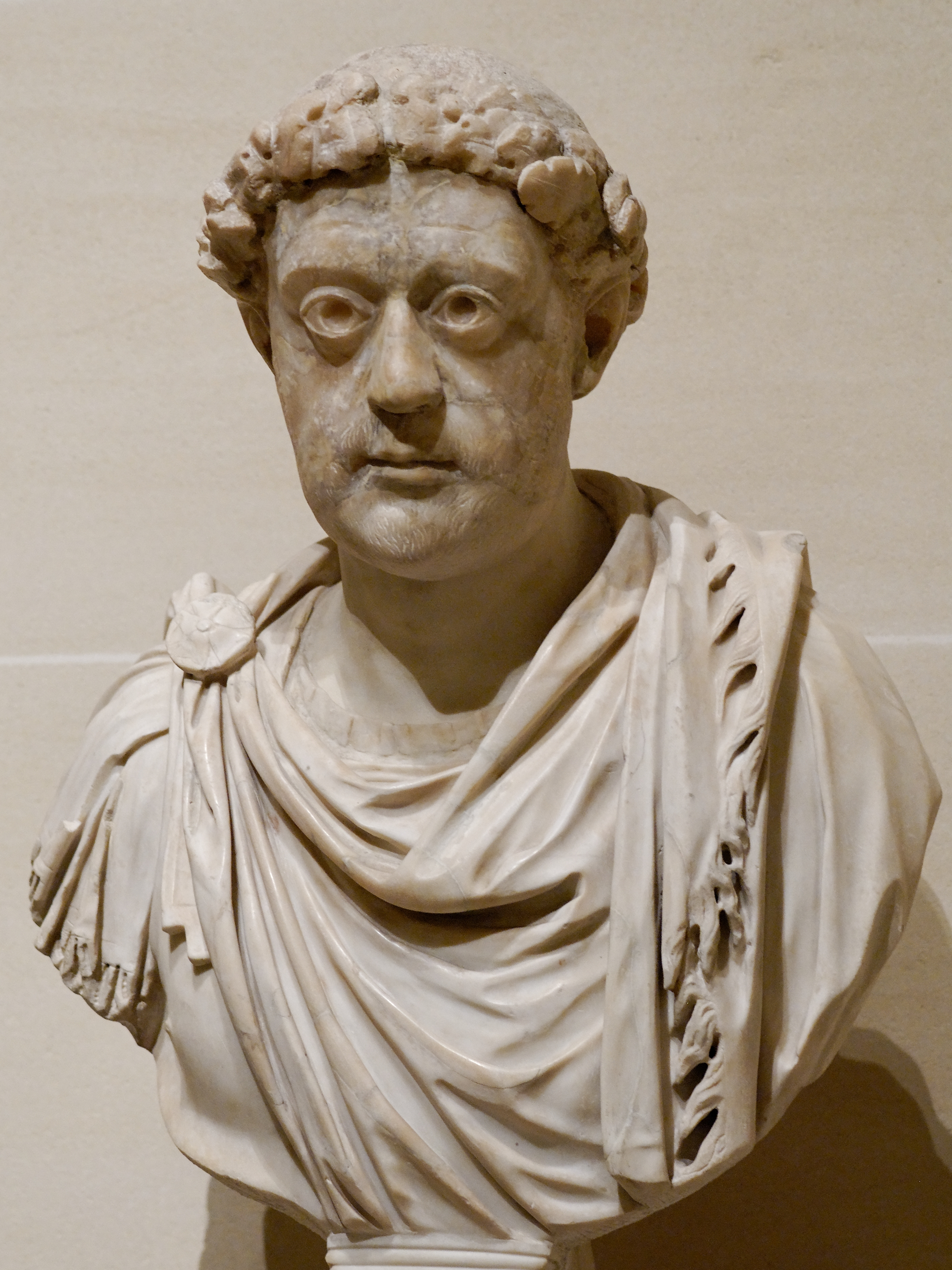
Imperial portrait of St. Leo.

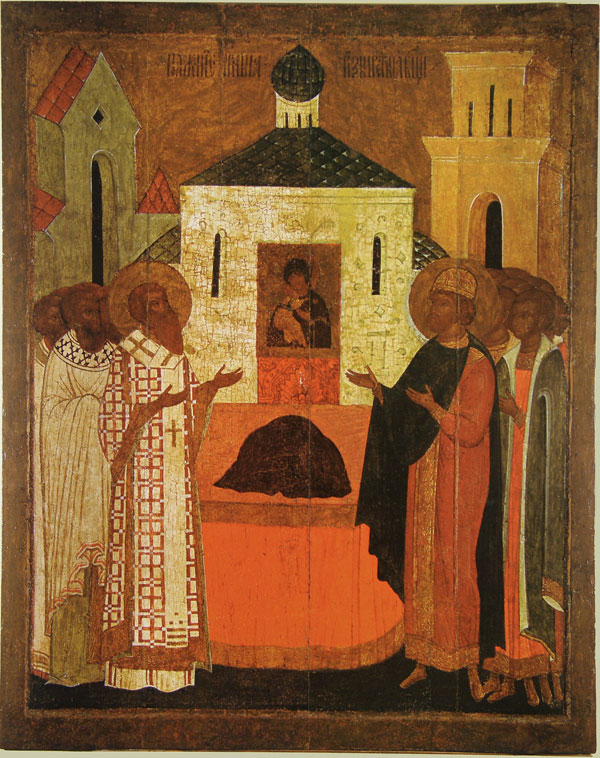
St. Leo's enshrinement of the Robe of the Theotokos in the Church of Sts. Peter and Mark, in Blachernae.

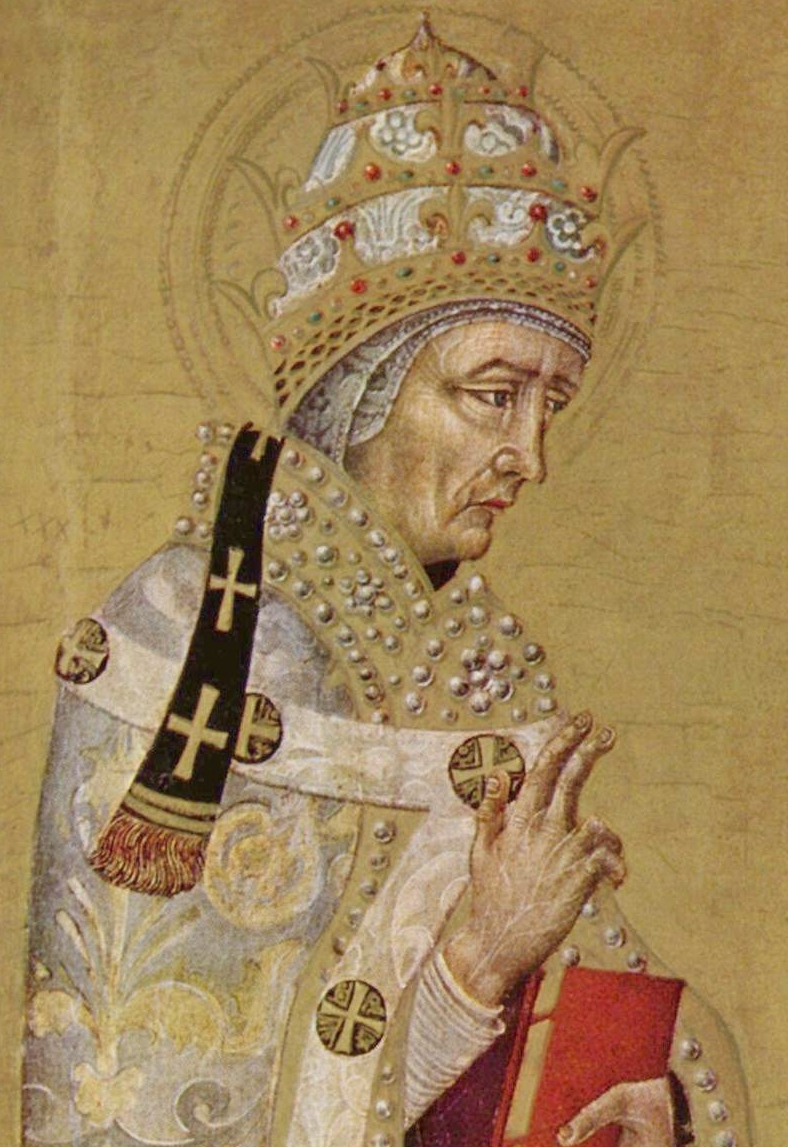
Saint Fabian, Pope of Rome.

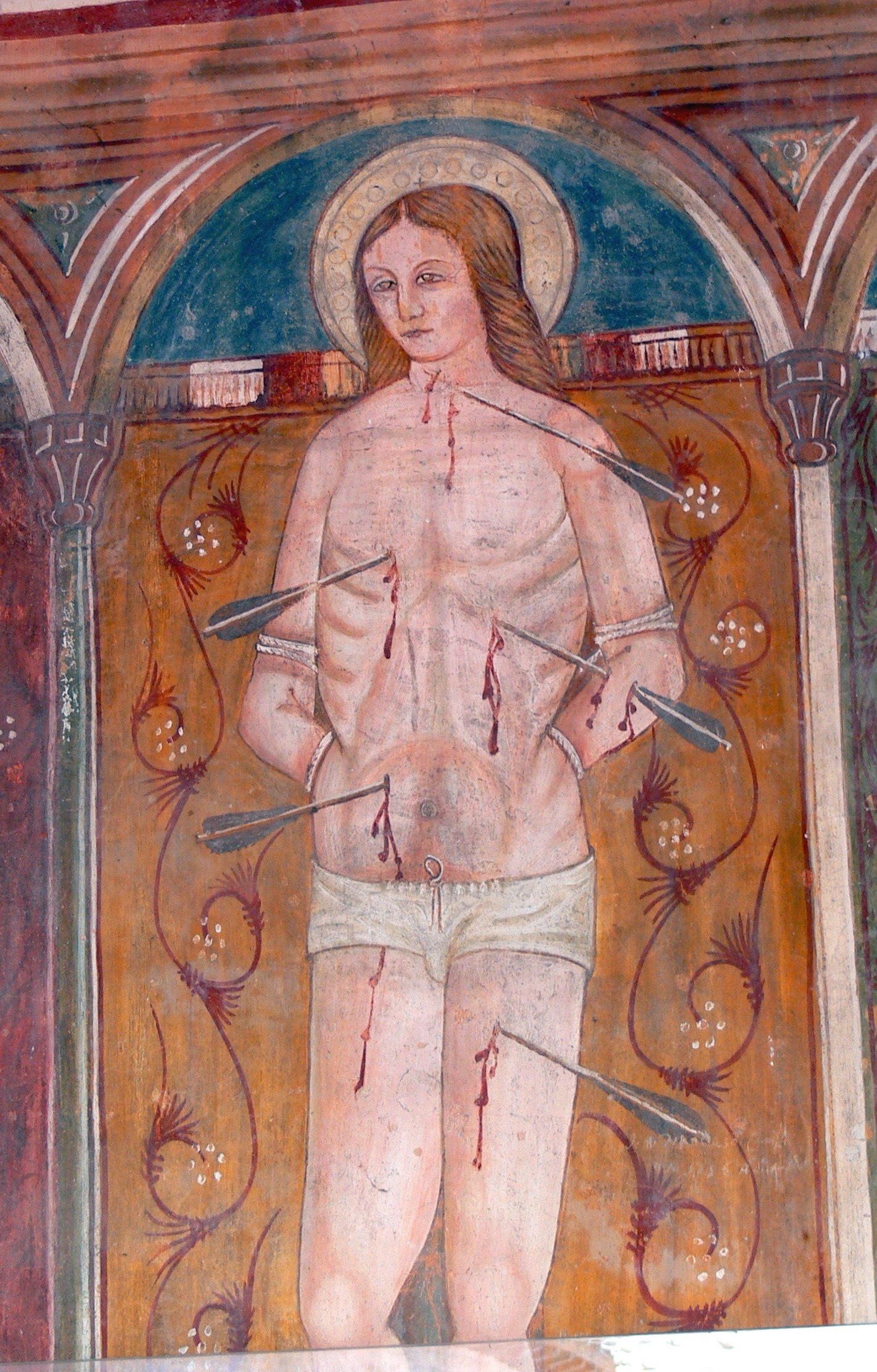
Martyrdom of St. Sebastian.

St. Euthymius the Silent, Schemamonk of the Kiev Caves.

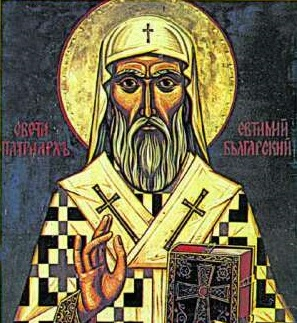
St. Euthymius, Patriarch of Tarnovo and Bulgaria.
(Samokov Artistic School, 1809).

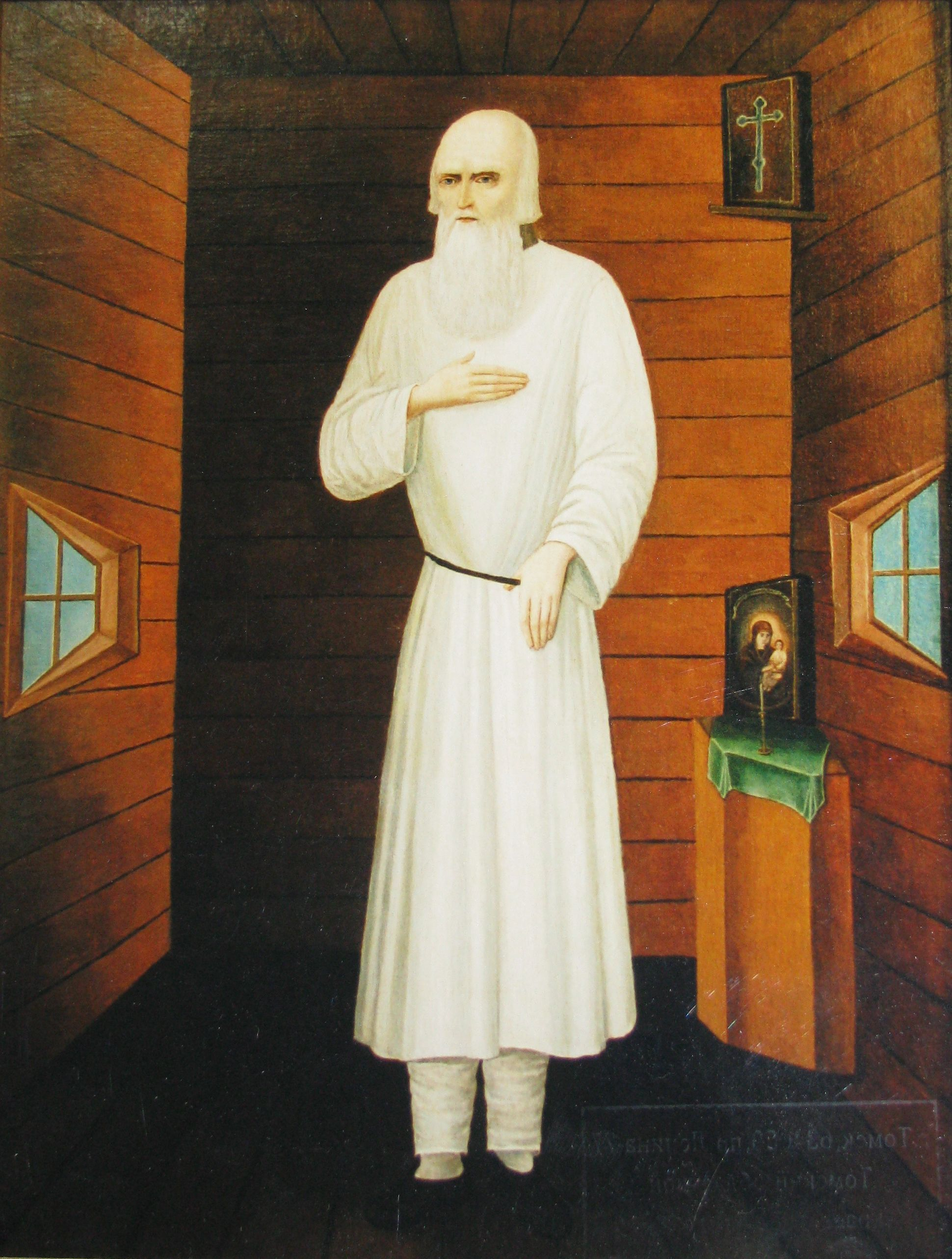
Venerable Theodore Kuzmich of Tomsk.

New Confessor Ekvtime (Euthymius) Kereselidze of Georgia.

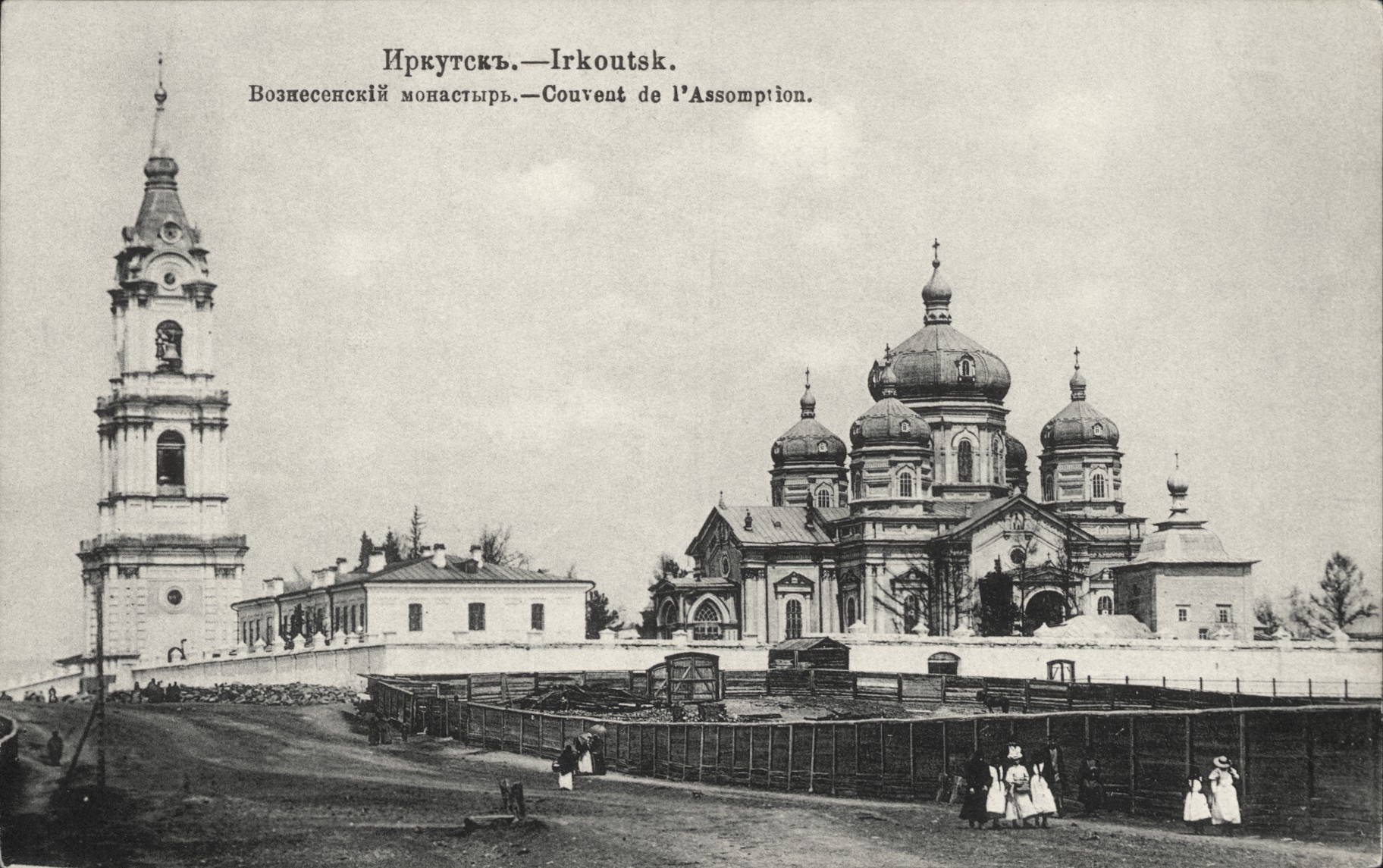
Ascension Monastery, Irkutsk.
(c. 1910's).

== Sources ==
- January 20 / February 2. Orthodox Calendar (PRAVOSLAVIE.RU).
- February 2 / January 20. HOLY TRINITY RUSSIAN ORTHODOX CHURCH (A parish of the Patriarchate of Moscow).
- January 20. OCA - The Lives of the Saints.
- The Autonomous Orthodox Metropolia of Western Europe and the Americas (ROCOR). St. Hilarion Calendar of Saints for the year of our Lord 2004. St. Hilarion Press (Austin, TX). p. 9.
- January 20. Latin Saints of the Orthodox Patriarchate of Rome.
- The Roman Martyrology. Transl. by the Archbishop of Baltimore. Last Edition, According to the Copy Printed at Rome in 1914. Revised Edition, with the Imprimatur of His Eminence Cardinal Gibbons. Baltimore: John Murphy Company, 1916. pp. 20–21.

Greek Sources

- Great Synaxaristes: (in Greek) 20 ΙΑΝΟΥΑΡΙΟΥ. ΜΕΓΑΣ ΣΥΝΑΞΑΡΙΣΤΗΣ.
- (in Greek) Συναξαριστής. 20 Ιανουαρίου. ECCLESIA.GR. (H ΕΚΚΛΗΣΙΑ ΤΗΣ ΕΛΛΑΔΟΣ).

Russian Sources

- (in Russian) 2 февраля (20 января). Православная Энциклопедия под редакцией Патриарха Московского и всея Руси Кирилла (электронная версия). (Orthodox Encyclopedia - Pravenc.ru).
- (in Russian) 20 января (ст.ст.) 2 февраля 2014 (нов. ст.). Русская Православная Церковь Отдел внешних церковных связей. (DECR).
