= February 2 (Eastern Orthodox liturgics) =

Day in the Eastern Orthodox liturgical calendar

Eastern Orthodox liturgical calendar
February 1	February 2	February 3
February 2 O.S. ≍ February 15 N.S. February 2 N.S ≍ January 20 O.S.

Fresco of the Presentation of our Lord, God and Savior Jesus Christ in the Temple. (Dionysiou Monastery, 1547).

February 2 in Eastern Orthodox liturgical calendars is a feast day and a day of commemoration of saints and martyrs. Although some Orthodox churches use the Revised Julian Calendar and others use the traditional Julian calendar, the fixed commemorations for their respective February 2 are broadly the same, no matter which calendar is used. (Note: Despite the dates being the same, the days to which they refer typically differ by 13 days. The notation Old Style or O.S. is sometimes used to indicate a date in the traditional Julian Calendar (the "Old Calendar"). The notation New Style or N.S, indicates a date in the Revised Julian calendar (the "New Calendar").)

== Feasts ==
- The Presentation of our Lord, God and Savior Jesus Christ in the Temple (also The Meeting of the Lord, or Hypapante), 40 days after His sacred birth. (Note: "THE Purification of the Blessed Virgin Mary, called by the Greeks Hypapante (meeting) of the Lord.")

== Saints ==
- Martyr Agathadorus of Tyana in Cappadocia.

== Pre-Schism Western saints ==
- Saint Apronian, a Roman executioner who converted to Orthodoxy when taking the martyr St Sisinnius before the tribunal and was then himself martyred (c. 304) (Note: "At Rome, on the Salarian road, the passion of St. Apronian, a notary. Whilst he was yet a Gentile, and was leading St. Sisinius out of prison, to present him before the governor Laodicius, he heard a voice from heaven saying, "Come ye, the blessed of my Father, possess the kingdom prepared for you from the beginning of the world." At once he believed, was baptized, and after confessing our Lord, received sentence of death.")
- Saint Flosculus (Flou), Bishop of Orleans in France (c. 480)
- Saint Laurence of Canterbury, the second Archbishop of Canterbury (619) (Note: Sent by St Gregory the Great to England, St Augustine sent him back to Rome to report on the English mission and to bring more help. The second Archbishop of Canterbury from 604, he suffered during the pagan reaction and thought of fleeing to France. He was rebuked by the Apostle Peter in a dream and in the end succeeded in converting Eadbald.) (see also: February 3 - East)
- Saint Adalbert I of Ostrevent (Adalbald), founder of Marchiennes Abbey (652) (Note: Born in Flanders in Belgium, he was a son or grandson of St Gertrude of Hamage. He married a lady named Rictrude, who is also venerated as a saint together with their four children, Maurontius, Clotsindis, Eusebia and Adalsindis. Adalbald was murdered by relatives of his wife who disapproved of the marriage and he was venerated as a martyr.)
- Saint Feock, a saint recalled by a church dedication in Cornwall. (Note: According to the Royal Institution of Cornwall, Feock seems to be identified with Saint Fiacc, commemorated on October 12.)
- Saint Adeloga (Hadeloga), a daughter of Charles Martel, first Abbess of Kitzingen in Germany (c. 745) (Note: See: (in German) Hadeloga von Kitzingen. Wikipedia. (German Wikipedia).)
- Saint Burchard of Würzburg, first Bishop of Wurzburg (754)
- Martyrs of Ebsdorf, martyred at the Battle of Luneberg Heath near Ebsdorf, Saxony (880) (Note: In 880 a Christian army was caught in the ice and snow and was defeated by pagan Norsemen at Ebsdorf in the north of Germany. Among them, St Bruno and four bishops, eleven nobles and many others were slain and venerated as martyrs.)

- Saint Marquard, Bishop of Hildesheim, martyred with others at Ebsdorf in Germany (880)
- Saint Theodoric, third Bishop of Minden, martyred with others at Ebsdorf in Germany (880)

- Saint Columbanus, born in Ireland, he lived as a hermit near the church of Saint-Bavo in Ghent in Belgium (959)

== Post-Schism Orthodox saints ==
- New Martyr Jordan of Trebizond, at Constantinople (1650)
- New Hieromartyr Gabriel, Hierodeacon, of Constantinople (1676)
- Venerable Anthimos (Vagianos) of Chios (1960) (see also: February 15 - Greek)
- Venerable Ekvtime (Kereselidze) the Confessor, of Georgia (1944) (Note: See also: (in Georgian) ექვთიმე აღმსარებელი (კერესელიძე). (Georgian Wikipedia).; (in Russian) Евфимий Исповедник (Кереселидзе). Википедии. (Russian Wikipedia).) (see also: January 20 - Slavonic)

== Other commemorations ==
- Repose of Schema-monk Seraphim of Valaam Monastery (1860)

=== Icons ===
- Synaxis of the Icon of the Theotokos the Hypapante of Kalamata, patron saint of Kalamata.
- Synaxis of the Icon of the Theotokos "Apekois" (Ypakoe), at the Church of the Hypapante on Kalymnos.
- Synaxis of the Icon of the Theotokos "Dreadful Bee", at Leivadi on Kythira. (Note: Greek: Κακιᾶς Μέλισσας. The icon has this epithet because during a raid of the island by pirates, who wished to plunder the monastery, a colony of bees suddenly appeared that attacked the pirates and forced them to retreat.)
- Synaxis of the Icon of the Theotokos of Goumenissa. (see also: August 17)
- Synaxis of the Icon of the Theotokos "'Flevariotissa' or 'Libya'", (Note: Greek: Φλεβαριωτίσσης ἢ Λιβύης. She is called this because of the dark colour.) at Mesaria on the island of Astypalaia.
- Synaxis of the Icon of the Theotokos "Flevariotissa", (Note: Greek: Φλεβαριώτισσας. She is called this either because the feast day is in the month of February, or according to another tradition, because a vein (Greek: φλέβα) of water had been discovered in this area.) at Ampelakia on Salamis Island.
- Synaxis of the Icon of the Theotokos "Chrysaliniotissa", (Note: Greek: Χρυσαλινιώτισσας' ἢ 'Ἀλινιώτισσας.) in Leukosia, Cyprus.

== Icon gallery ==
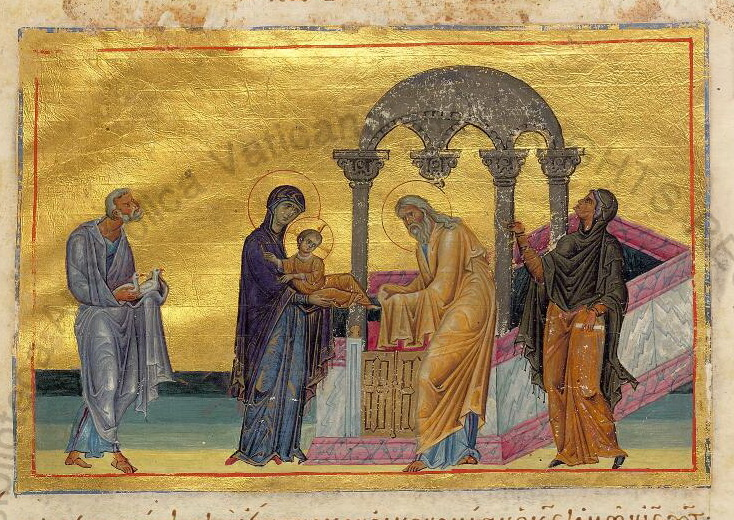
The Presentation of our Lord, God and Savior Jesus Christ in the Temple.
(Menologion of Basil II, 10th century).

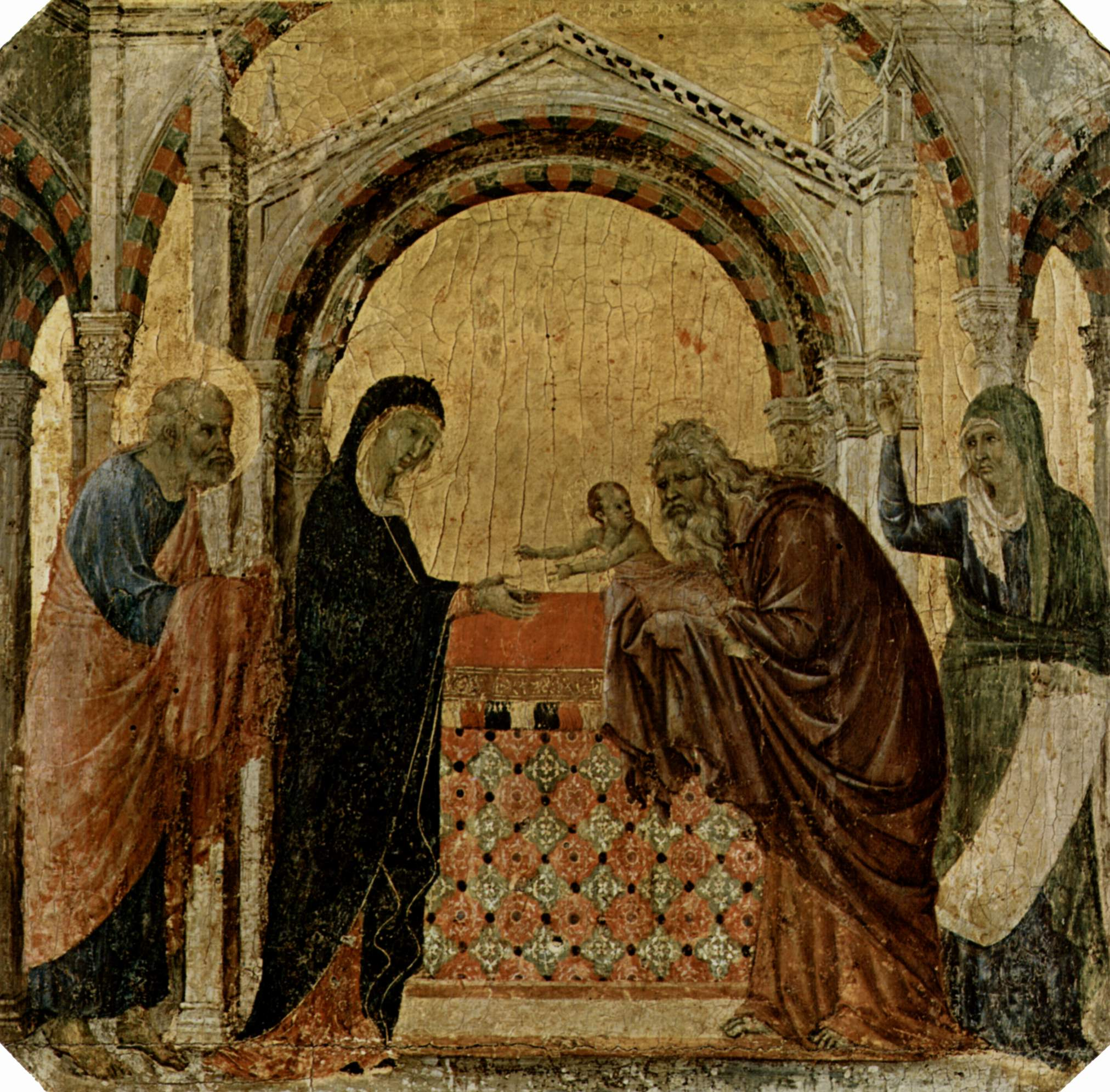
The Presentation of our Lord, God and Savior Jesus Christ in the Temple.
(Duccio, c. 1308-1311).

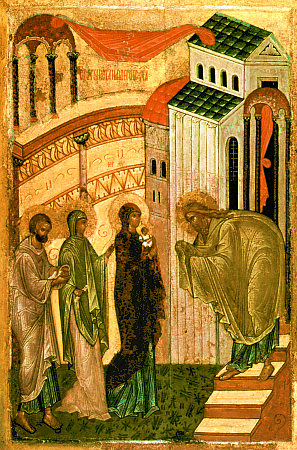
The Presentation of our Lord, God and Savior Jesus Christ in the Temple.
(Russian icon, late 15th-century).

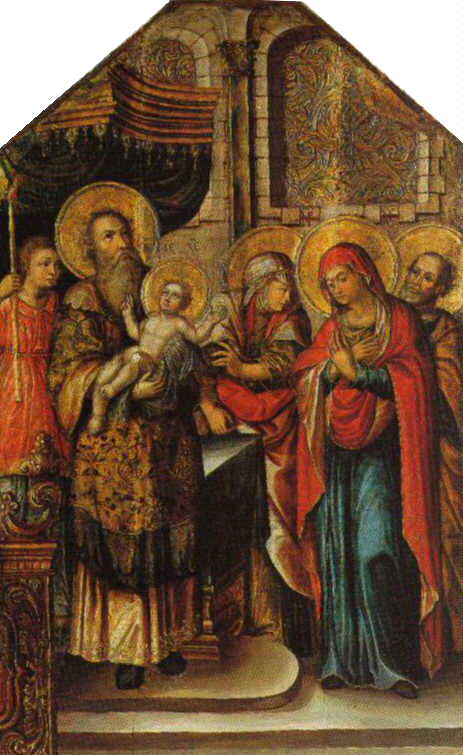
The Presentation of our Lord.
(Belarus, 1731).

== Sources ==
- February 2 / 15. Orthodox Calendar (Pravoslavie.ru).
- February 15 / 2. Holy Trinity Russian Orthodox Church (A parish of the Patriarchate of Moscow).
- February 2. OCA - The Lives of the Saints.
- The Autonomous Orthodox Metropolia of Western Europe and the Americas. St. Hilarion Calendar of Saints for the year of our Lord 2004. St. Hilarion Press (Austin, TX). p. 12.
- The Second Day of the Month of February. Orthodoxy in China.
- February 2. Latin Saints of the Orthodox Patriarchate of Rome.
- The Roman Martyrology. Transl. by the Archbishop of Baltimore. Last Edition, According to the Copy Printed at Rome in 1914. Revised Edition, with the Imprimatur of His Eminence Cardinal Gibbons. Baltimore: John Murphy Company, 1916. pp. 35–36.
- Rev. Richard Stanton. A Menology of England and Wales, or, Brief Memorials of the Ancient British and English Saints Arranged According to the Calendar, Together with the Martyrs of the 16th and 17th Centuries. London: Burns & Oates, 1892. pp. 46-48.

Greek Sources

- Great Synaxaristes: (in Greek) 2 Φεβρουαρίου. Μεγασ Συναξαριστησ.
- (in Greek) Συναξαριστής. 2 Φεβρουαρίου. Ecclesia.gr. (H Εκκλησια Τησ Ελλαδοσ).

Russian Sources

- (in Russian) 15 февраля (2 февраля). Православная Энциклопедия под редакцией Патриарха Московского и всея Руси Кирилла (электронная версия). (Orthodox Encyclopedia - Pravenc.ru).
- (in Russian) 2 февраля по старому стилю / 15 февраля по новому стилю. Русская Православная Церковь - Православный церковный календарь на 2018 год.
