= Pavel Florensky =

Russian priest and polymath (1882–1937)

The Reverend Pavel Florensky
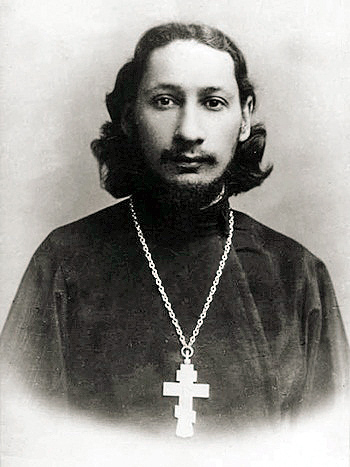
- Born: Pavel Alexandrovich Florensky; 21 January 1882; Yevlakh, Elisabethpol Governorate, Russian Empire
- Died: 8 December 1937 (aged 55); Leningrad Oblast, Russian SFSR, Soviet Union

Education
- Education: Imperial Moscow University
- Academic advisor: Nikolai Bugaev

Philosophical work
- Era: 20th-century philosophy
- Region: Russian philosophy
- School: Christian philosophy Sophiology
- Institutions: Moscow Theological Academy
- Main interests: Philosophy of religion
- Notable ideas: Antinomy in religious thought, the Russian icon as a symbol of spiritual reality, reverse perspective

Pavel Alexandrovich Florensky (also P. A. Florenskiĭ, Florenskii, Florenskij; Russian: Павел Александрович Флоренский; Armenian: Պավել Ֆլորենսկի, romanized: Pavel Florenski; 21 January [O.S. 9 January] 1882 – December 8, 1937) was a Russian Orthodox theologian, priest, philosopher, mathematician, physicist, electrical engineer, inventor, polymath, neomartyr and folk saint. During the later twentieth century, statements had appeared noting a recognition by the Russian Orthodox Church of him as a saint, though it was later firmly noted that no such decision had been made.

== Biography ==
=== Early life ===
Pavel Aleksandrovich Florensky was born on 21 January [O.S. 9 January] 1882 in the town of Yevlakh in Elisabethpol Governorate (in present-day Azerbaijan) into the family of a railroad engineer, Aleksandr Florensky. His father came from a family of Russian Orthodox priests while his mother Olga (Salomia) Saparova (Saparyan, Sapharashvili) was of the Tbilisi Armenian nobility in Georgia. His maternal grandmother Sofia Paatova (Paatashvili) was from an Armenian family from Karabakh, living in Bolnisi, Georgia. Florensky "always searched for the roots of his Armenian family" and noted that they came from Karabakh.

Florensky completed his high school studies (1893-1899) at the Tbilisi classical lyceum, where several companions were later to distinguish themselves, among them the founder of Russian Cubo-Futurism, David Burliuk. In 1899, Florensky underwent a religious crisis, connected to a visit to Leo Tolstoy caused by an awareness of the limits and relativity of the scientific positivism and rationality which had been an integral part of his initial formation within his family and high school. He decided to construct his own solution by developing theories that would reconcile the spiritual and the scientific visions on the basis of mathematics. He entered the department of mathematics of the Imperial Moscow University and studied under Nikolai Bugaev, and became friends with his son, the future poet and theorist of Russian symbolism, Andrei Bely. He was particularly drawn to Georg Cantor's set theory.

He also took courses on ancient philosophy. During this period the young Florensky, who had no religious upbringing, began taking an interest in studies beyond "the limitations of physical knowledge" In 1904 he graduated from the Imperial Moscow University and declined a teaching position at the university: instead, he proceeded to study theology at the Ecclesiastical Academy in Sergiyev Posad. During his theological studies there, he came into contact with Elder Isidore on a visit to Gethsemane Hermitage, and Isidore was to become his spiritual guide and father. Together with fellow students Ern, Svenitsky and Brikhnichev he founded a society, the Christian Struggle Union (Союз Христиaнской Борьбы), with the revolutionary aim of rebuilding Russian society according to the principles of Vladimir Solovyov. Subsequently he was arrested for membership in this society in 1906: however, he later lost his interest in the Radical Christianity movement.

=== Intellectual interests ===
During his studies at the Ecclesiastical Academy, Florensky's interests included philosophy, religion, art and folklore. He became a prominent member of the Russian symbolism movement, together with his friend Andrei Bely and published works in the magazines New Way (Новый Путь) and Libra (Весы). He also started his main philosophical work, The Pillar and Ground of the Truth: an Essay in Orthodox Theodicy in Twelve Letters. The complete book was published only in 1914 but most of it was finished at the time of his graduation from the academy in 1908.

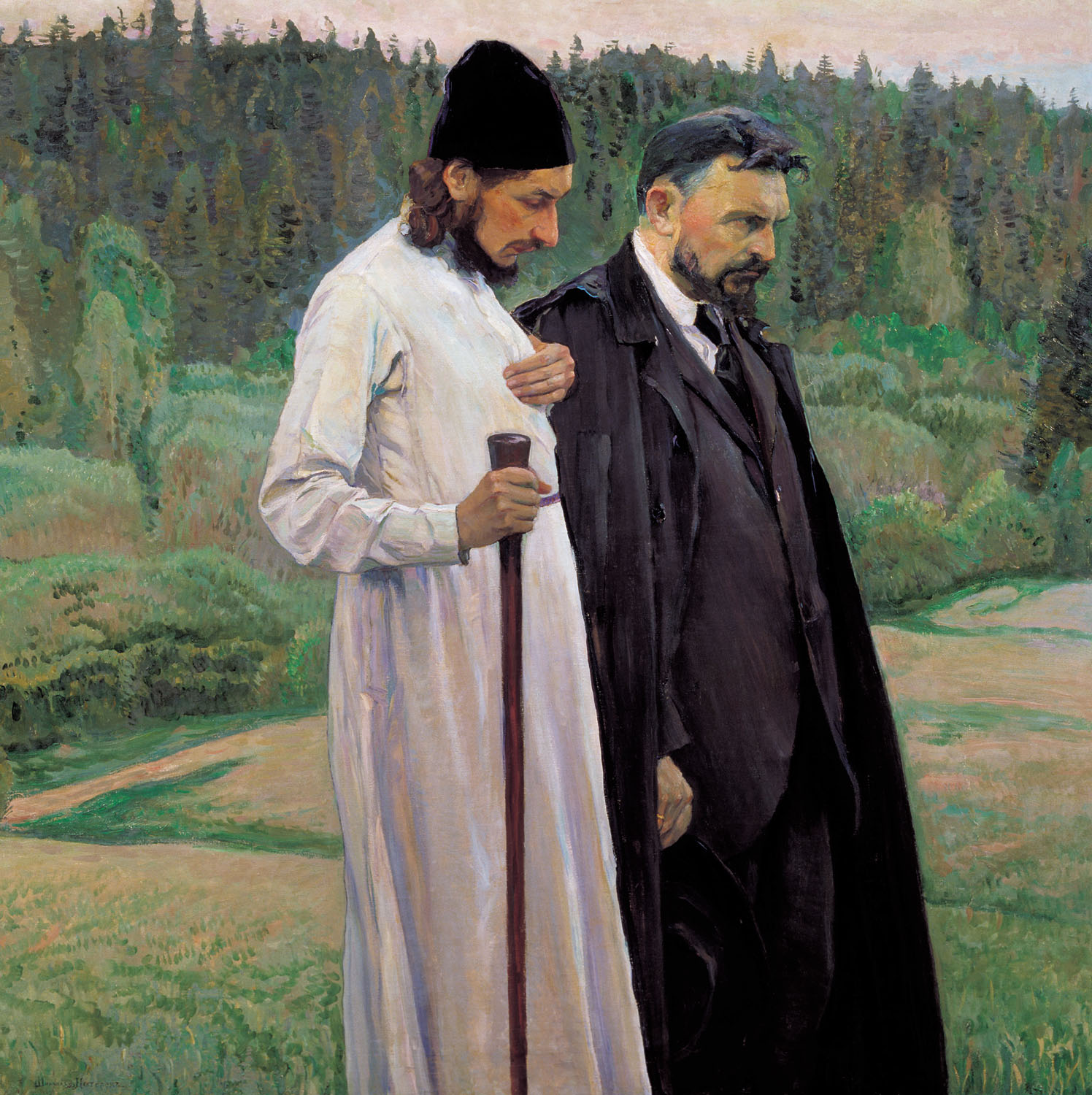
Mikhail Nesterov's Philosophers (1917), Pavel Florensky (left) and Sergei Bulgakov

According to the foreword of a book of his letters published by the Princeton University Press: "The book is a series of twelve letters to a 'brother' or 'friend,' who may be understood symbolically as Christ. Central to Florensky's work is an exploration of the various meanings of Christian love, which is viewed as a combination of philia (friendship) and agape (universal love). He describes the ancient Christian rites of the adelphopoiesis (brother-making), which joins male friends in chaste bonds of love. In addition, Florensky was one of the first thinkers in the twentieth century to develop the idea of the Divine Sophia, who has become one of the central concerns of feminist theologians."

Florensky's biographer Avril Pyman evaluates Florensky's position regarding Jews as, contextually for the period, a middle way between liberal critics who excoriated at the time of the incident Russia's backwardness and the behaviour of instigators of pogroms like the Black Hundreds.

After graduating from the academy, he married Anna Giatsintova, the sister of a friend, in August 1910, a move which shocked his friends who were familiar with his aversion to marriage. He continued to teach philosophy and lived at Troitse-Sergiyeva Lavra until 1919. In 1911, he was ordained into the priesthood. In 1914, he wrote his dissertation, About Spiritual Truth. He published works on philosophy, theology, art theory, mathematics and electrodynamics. Between 1911 and 1917, he was the chief editor of the most authoritative Orthodox theological publication of that time, Bogoslovskiy Vestnik. He was also a spiritual teacher of the controversial Russian writer Vasily Rozanov, urging him to reconcile with the Orthodox Church.

Florensky was influenced by Rudolf Steiner.

=== Period of Communist rule in Russia ===
After the October Revolution, he formulated his position as: "I have developed my own philosophical and scientific worldview, which, though it contradicts the vulgar interpretation of communism... does not prevent me from honestly working in the service of the state." After the Bolsheviks closed the Troitse-Sergiyeva Lavra (1918) and the Sergievo-Posad Church (1921), where he was the priest, he moved to Moscow to work on the State Plan for Electrification of Russia (ГОЭЛРО) under the recommendation of Leon Trotsky who strongly believed in Florensky's ability to help the government in the electrification of rural Russia. According to contemporaries, Florensky in his priest's cassock, working alongside other leaders of a Government department, was a remarkable sight.

In 1924, he published a large monograph on dielectrics. He worked simultaneously as the Scientific Secretary of the Historical Commission on Troitse-Sergiyeva Lavra and published his works on ancient Russian art. He was rumoured to be the main organizer of a secret endeavour to save the relics of St. Sergii Radonezhsky whose destruction had been ordered by the government.

In the second half of the 1920s, he mostly worked on physics and electrodynamics, eventually publishing his paper Imaginary numbers in Geometry («Мнимости в геометрии. Расширение области двухмерных образов геометрии») devoted to the geometrical interpretation of Albert Einstein's theory of relativity. Among other things, he proclaimed that the geometry of imaginary numbers predicted by the theory of relativity for a body moving faster than light is the geometry of the Kingdom of God. For mentioning the Kingdom of God in that work, he was accused of anti-Soviet agitation and propaganda by Soviet authorities.

=== 1928–1937: exile, imprisonment, death ===
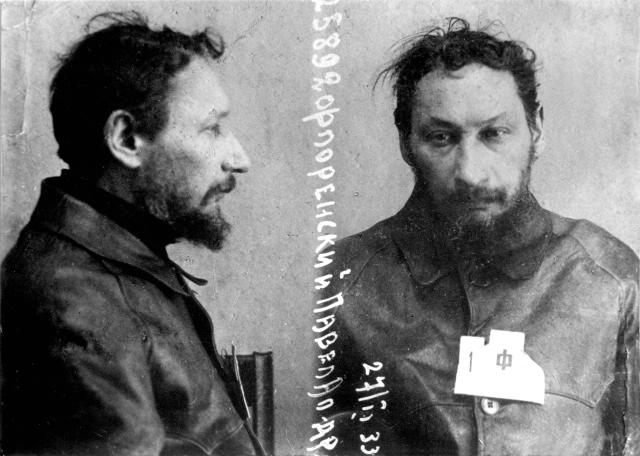
Pavel Florensky after his arrest in 1934

In 1928, Florensky was exiled to Nizhny Novgorod. After the intercession of Ekaterina Peshkova (wife of Maxim Gorky), Florensky was allowed to return to Moscow. On 26 February 1933 he was arrested again, on suspicion of engaging in a conspiracy with Pavel Gidiulianov, a professor of canon law who was a complete stranger to Florensky, to overthrow the state and install, with Nazi assistance, a fascist monarchy. He defended himself vigorously against the imputations until he realized that by showing a willingness to admit them, though false, he would enable several acquaintances to resecure their liberty. He was sentenced to ten years in the labor camps by the infamous Article 58 of Joseph Stalin's criminal code (clauses ten and eleven: "agitation against the Soviet system" and "publishing agitation materials against the Soviet system"). The published agitation materials were the monograph about the theory of relativity. His manner of continuing to wear priestly garb annoyed his employers. The state offered him numerous opportunities to go into exile in Paris, but he declined them.

He served at the Baikal Amur Mainline camp until 1934 when he was moved to Solovki, where he conducted research into producing iodine and agar out of the local seaweed. In 1937 he was transferred to Leningrad (now Saint Petersburg) where, on 25 November, he was sentenced by an extrajudicial NKVD troika to death. According to a legend he was sentenced for the refusal to disclose the location of the head of St. Sergii Radonezhsky that the communists wanted to destroy. The saint's head was indeed saved and in 1946 the Troitse-Sergiyeva Lavra was opened again. The relics of St. Sergii became fashionable once more. The saint's relics were returned to Lavra by Pavel Golubtsov, later known as Archbishop Sergiy.

After sentencing, Florensky was transported in a special train together with another 500 prisoners to a location near Leningrad, where he was shot dead on the night of 8 December 1937 in a wood not far from the city. The site of his burial is unknown. Antonio Maccioni states that he was shot at the Rzhevsky Artillery Range, near Toksovo, located about twenty kilometers northeast of Leningrad and was buried in a secret grave in Koirankangas near Toksovo together with 30,000 others who were executed by the NKVD at the same time. In 1997, a mass burial ditch was excavated in the Sandarmokh forest, which may well contain his remains. His name was registered in 1982 among the list of New Martyrs and Confessors.

He was posthumously rehabilitated in 1958 (of the 1933 charges) and 1959 (of the 1937 charges.)

== Influence ==
Florensky, often read for his contributions to the religious renaissance of his time or scientific thinking, came to be studied in a broader perspective in the 1960s, a change associated with the revival of interest in neglected aspects of his oeuvre shown by the Tartu school of semiotics, which evaluated his works in terms of their anticipation of themes that formed part of the theoretical avant-garde's interests in a general theory of cultural signs at that time. Read in this light, the evidence that Florensky's thinking actively responded to the art of the Russian modernists. Of particular importance in this regard was their publication of his 1919 essay, delivered as a lecture the following year, on spatial organization in the Russian icon tradition, entitled "Reverse Perspective", a concept which Florensky, like Erwin Panofsky later, picked up from Oskar Wulff's 1907 essay, 'Die umgekehrte Perspektive und die Niedersicht. Here Florensky contrasted the dominant concept of spatiality in Renaissance art analysing the visual conventions employed in the iconological tradition. This work has remained since its publication a seminal text in this area down to the present day. In that essay, his interpretation has recently been developed and reformulated critically by Clemena Antonova, who argues rather that what Florensky analysed is better described in terms of "simultaneous planes".

== See also ==
- Vladimir N. Beneshevich
- Theophilus of Antioch
- Imiaslavie
- Andrei N. Kolmogorov
- USSR anti-religious campaign (1928–1941)
- Superluminal speeds
- Tachyonic particle
- Imaginary mass fields
