= Walfrid =

Italian saint

Walfrid, Uualefred, or Galfrido della Gherardesca, was an eighth-century saint from Pisa, Italy.

== Life and death ==
Walfrid was a prosperous and honored citizen of Pisa. Though he had six children with his long-time wife, Thesia, they conducted a dutifully religious lifestyle. There came a time when, drawn to a closer service of God, they each felt called to monastic life. Together with two friends of similar views, he co-founded the Abbey of San Pietro di Palazzuolo on Monteverdi. His wife and one of his daughters took the veil in a convent he built nearby. His favorite son, Gimfrid (Guinifridi), caused Walfrid a great deal of trouble when he ran away from the monastery. Caught and permanently injured in his right hand, a penitent Gimfrid was returned to the monastery, which he presided over after Walfrid's death.

Walfrid died in 765 AD and was sainted in 1861. His feast day is February 15.
