= Elder Isidore =

Elder Isidore (1814–1908) was a Russian Orthodox monastic of Gethsemane Hermitage in Russia.

Elder Isidore was born with the name John in Lyskov in an unknown year (estimated to be 1814). While still in the womb, his mother was told to have visited St. Seraphim of Sarov, who called her from a crowd and bowed before her, prophesying that her son would a great Ascetic. In his youth he entered Gethsemane Skete in Sarov and became a cell attendant to Archimandrite Anthony. In 1860 he took his vows and began a life of asceticism at Gethsame. Of his spiritual children, one of the most notable was Pavel Florensky, who wrote a narrative of his life after his repose called "Salt of the Earth". Elder Isidore died of natural causes in 1908.
