= Chronological list of saints and blesseds in the 11th century =

A list of people, who died during the 11th century, who have received recognition as Blessed (through beatification) or Saint (through canonization) from the Catholic Church:

| Name | Birth | Birthplace | Death | Place of death | Notes |
|---|---|---|---|---|---|
| Rainbold (Rainnold) | | | 1001 | | |
| Theobald | 927 | | 1001 | | |
| John the Iberian | | | 1002 | | |
| Podius | | | 1002 | | Bishop of Florence |
| Athanasius the Athonite | 920 | | 1003 | | |
| Gregory of Narek | 950 | | 1003 | | |
| Abbo of Fleury | 945 | | 1004 | | |
| Aderald | | | 1004 | | |
| Adalbero | | | 1005 | | Bishop of Verdun |
| Alfrick | | | 1005 | Canterbury, Kent | Archbishop of Canterbury |
| Benedict of Benevento and Companions | | | 1005 | | |
| Macarius of Collesano | | | 1005 | | |
| Wulsin (Abbot Ulsinus) | | | 1005 | | Bishop of Sherborne |
| Attilanus | 937 | | 1007 | | Bishop of Zamora |
| Peter of Perugia (Peter of Vincioli) | | | 1007 | | |
| Bernard of Menthon (Montjoux) | 923 | | 1008 | | |
| Justus of Poland | | | 1008 | | |
| Arduinus | | | 1009 | | |
| Bruno of Querfurt (Bonifatius) | 974 | | 1009 | | |
| Andrew Zorard | 980 | | 1009? | | |
| Ansfried of Utrecht (Ansfridus) | 945 | | 1010 | | Bishop of Utrecht |
| Atto | | | 1010 | | |
| Gulstan | | | 1010 | | |
| Willigis | 940 | | 1011 | | Bishop of Mainz |
| Alphege (Elphege) | 954 | | 1012 | | |
| Benedict of Szkalka | | | 1012 | | |
| Coloman of Stockerau | | | 1012 | | |
| Guy of Anderlecht | 950 | | 1012 | | |
| Macarius | | | 1012 | | |
| Libentius | | | 1013 | | Bishop of Hamburg |
| Adelaide, Abbess of Vilich | 970 | | 1015 | | |
| Elsiar | | | 1015 | | |
| Vladimir I of Kiev | 956 | | 1015 | | |
| Eadnothus | | | 1016 | | Bishop of Dorchester |
| Gormcal | | | 1016 | | |
| Simeon the Armenian | | | 1016 | | |
| Walstan | | | 1016 | | |
| Osburga | | | 1018 | | |
| Heimerad | 970 | | 1019 | | |
| Gaudentius (Radim Gaudentius) | 970 | | 1020 | | Archbishop of Gniezno| |
| Firmian | | | 1020 | | |
| Heribert of Cologne (Herbert) | 970 | | 1021 | | |
| Herve | | | 1021 | | |
| Bernward of Hildesheim | 960 | | 1022 | | Bishop of Hildesheim |
| Olof Skötkonung | 980 | | 1022 | | |
| Theodoric of Orleans | | | 1022 | | Bishop of Orléans |
| Agatha Hildegard | | | 1024 | | |
| Henry II, Holy Roman Emperor | 972 | | 1024 | | |
| Bononio | | | 1026 | | |
| Aurelia | | | 1027 | | |
| Romuald | 952 | | 1027 | | |
| Ulfrid | | | 1028 | | |
| Fulbert of Chartres | 970 | | 1028 | | Bishop of Chartres |
| Gerard of Saint-Wandrille | 970 | | 1029 | | |
| Elfleda (Ethelfleda) | | | 1030 | | |
| Olaf II of Norway | 995 | | 1030 | | |
| Dominic of Sora | 951 | | 1031 | | |
| Saint Emeric of Hungary | 1007 | | 1031 | | |
| William of Volpiano (William of Dijon) | 962 | | 1031 | | |
| Lolanus | | | 1034 | | |
| Astrik (Anastasius) | | | 1035 | | Bishop of Břevnov |
| Saint Ermengol | | | 1035 | | Bishop of Urgell |
| Meinwerk, Bishop of Paderborn | 975 | | 1036 | | |
| Felix of Rhuys | 970 | | 1038 | | |
| Gotthard of Hildesheim (Godehard) | 960 | | 1038 | | Bishop of Hildesheim |
| Lyutis | | | 1038 | | |
| Stephen I of Hungary | 975 | | 1038 | | |
| Regimbald (Regimbaut, Reginbald) | | | 1039 | | Bishop of Speyer |
| Cunigunde of Luxembourg (Kunegund) | 975 | | 1040 | | |
| Anastasius XIX (Astrik) | | | 1040 | | |
| Winaman | | | 1040 | | |
| Blessed Fortis Gabrielli | | | 1040 | | |
| William of Penacorada | | | 1042 | | |
| Hallvard Vebjørnsson | 1020 | | 1043 | | |
| Atto | | | 1044 | | Bishop of Oca-Valpuesta |
| Gregory. Bishop of Ostia | | | 1044 | | |
| Amicus | | | 1045 | | |
| Bertwald of Ramsbury (Brithwald) | | | 1045 | | Bishop of Ramsbury |
| Bruno | 1005 | | 1045 | | Bishop of Würzburg |
| Hilary | | | 1045 | | |
| Sigfrid of Sweden | | | 1045 | | |
| Blessed Gunther of Bohemia | 955 | | 1045 | | |
| Druthmar of Lorsch | | | 1046 | | |
| Gerard Sagredo | | | 1046 | | |
| Guy of Pomposa | | | 1046 | | |
| Blessed Richard | 970 | | 1046 | | |
| Poppo of Deinze | 977 | | 1048 | | |
| Ysarn | | | 1048 | | |
| Odilo of Cluny | 962 | | 1049 | | |
| Alferius | 930 | | 1050 | | |
| Casilda | | | 1050 | | |
| Eadsige | | | 1050 | | |
| Guinizo | | | 1050 | | |
| Oliver | | | 1050 | | |
| Davinus | | | 1051 | | |
| Peter of Trevi | | | 1052 | | |
| Bardo | 982 | | 1053 | | |
| Procopius | | | 1053 | | |
| Pope Leo IX | 1002 | | 1054 | | Pope |
| Blessed Herman the Cripple | 1013 | | 1054 | | |
| Bartholomew of Grottaferrata (Bartholomew of Rossano) | 970 | | 1055 | | |
| Gurloes | | | 1057 | | |
| Íñigo of Oña (Eneco) | | | 1057 | | |
| Alfwold | | | 1058 | | Bishop of Salisbury |
| Ardanus (Ardaing, Ardan, Ardagne) | | | 1058 | | |
| Paternus | | | 1058 | | |
| Dominic Lauricatus (Dominic of San Severino) | 995 | | 1060 | | |
| Blessed Gisela of Hungary | 984 | | 1059 | | |
| Alvito (bishop of León) | | | 1063 | | |
| Ansueris | | | 1066 | | |
| Arialdo (Arialdo) | 1010 | | 1066 | | |
| Conrad of Trier (Cuno) | | | 1066 | | Bishop of Trier |
| Edward the Confessor | 1005 | | 1066 | | |
| Gottschalk (Obotrite prince) | 1010 | | 1066 | | |
| John Scotus | 990 | | 1066 | | Bishop of Ratzeburg |
| Ordonius of Astorga | | | 1066 | | Bishop of Astorga |
| Rudolph (Rodolph) | | | 1066 | | Bishop of Gubbio |
| Theobald of Provins | 1017 | | 1066 | | |
| Maurilius | 1000 | | 1067 | | |
| Robert of Chaise-Dieu | | | 1067 | | |
| William | | | 1067 | | Bishop of Roskilde |
| Austindus | | | 1068 | | |
| Amunia | | | 1069 | | |
| Arnulf | | | 1070 | | Bishop of Gap |
| Godelina | 1049 | | 1070 | | |
| Offa | | | 1070 | | |
| Robert of Frassinoro | | | 1070 | | |
| Theobald | 990 | | 1070 | | |
| Walter of L'Esterp | | | 1070 | | |
| Blessed Maurus of Nitra | | | 1070 | | Bishop of Pécs |
| Adela | | | 1071 | | |
| Peter Damian | 1007 | | 1072 | | |
| Anthony of Kiev | 983 | | 1073 | | |
| Dominic of Silos | 1000 | | 1073 | | |
| Garcia | | | 1073 | | |
| John Gualbert | 995 | | 1073 | | |
| Anno II (Archbishop of Cologne) | 1010 | | 1075 | | |
| Gervinus | | | 1075 | | |
| Blessed Gundekar II of Eichstätt | 1019 | | 1075 | | Bishop of Eichstätt |
| Lietbertus (Liebert, Leitbert) | 1010 | | 1076 | | Bishop of Cambrai |
| Gilduin of Dol | | | 1077 | | |
| Leontius | | | 1077 | | Bishop of Rostov |
| Raynerius (Raynier) | | | 1077 | | Bishop of Forconium (later the See of Aquila) |
| Leo of Lucca | | | 1079 | | |
| Stanislaus of Szczepanów | 1030 | | 1079 | | |
| Aldemar (the Wise) | | | 1080 | | |
| David of Sweden (David of Muntorp) | | | 1080 | | Bishop of Västerås |
| Eskil | | | 1080 | | |
| Gebuinus, Archbishop of Lyon | | | 1080 | | |
| Peter of Chavanon | 1003 | | 1080 | | |
| Simon de Crépy | | | 1082 | | |
| Sisebut | | | 1082 | | |
| Elaeth | | | 1084 | | |
| Alfano I (Archbishop of Salerno) | 1015 | | 1085 | | |
| Anastasius XX of Cluny | 1020 | | 1085 | | |
| Pope Gregory VII | 1029 | | 1085 | | Pope |
| Anselm of Lucca (Anselm the Younger) | 1036 | | 1086 | | Bishop of Lucca |
| Canute IV of Denmark (Knute) | 1043 | | 1086 | | |
| Sisebutus | | | 1086 | | |
| Arnold of Soissons (Arnoul) | 1040 | | 1087 | | Bishop of Soissons |
| Gebizo (Gerizo) | | | 1087 | | |
| Blessed Pope Victor III | 1026 | | 1087 | | Pope |
| Benno | 1010 | | 1088 | | Bishop of Osnabrück |
| Blessed Peter Igneus ("The Fiery") | | | 1089 | | Bishop of Albano |
| Isaias of Rostov | | | 1090 | | |
| Adalbero of Würzburg | 1010 | | 1090 | | Bishop of Würzburg |
| Altmann of Passau | 1015 | | 1091 | | Bishop of Passati |
| Blessed William of Hirsau | 1030 | | 1091 | | |
| Blessed Wolfhelm of Brauweiler | | | 1091 | | |
| Albert (Aribert) | | | 1092 | | Bishop of Como |
| Veremundus (Veremund) | | | 1092 | | |
| Amatus of Nusco | 1003 | | 1093 | | Bishop of Nusco |
| Saint Margaret of Scotland | 1045 | | 1093 | | |
| Ulrich of Zell | 1029 | | 1093 | | |
| John | | | 1094 | | Bishop of Monte Marano |
| Nicholas the Pilgrim | | | 1094 | | |
| Gerald of Sauve-Majeure | 1025 | | 1095 | | |
| Ladislaus I of Hungary | 1046 | | 1095 | | |
| Vitus | | | 1095 | | |
| Wulfstan (Bishop of Worcester) | 1008 | | 1095 | | Bishop of Worcester |
| Engelmer | | | 1096 | | |
| Blessed Andrew of Strumi | | | 1097 | | |
| Blessed Hildemar | | | 1097 | | |
| Matthew of Beauvais | | | 1098 | | |
| Saint Osmund | | | 1099 | | Bishop of Salisbury |
| Blessed Pope Urban II | 1042 | | 1099 | | Pope |
| Walter of Pontoise | 1030 | | 1099 | | |
| Ağanus | | | 1100 | | |
| Aleaunie (Adelelmus or Lesmes) | | Laudun, Poitou, France | 1100 | | |
| Aurea of San Millán | | | 1100 | | |
| Botuid (Botwid) | | | 1100 | | |
| Elgar | | | 1100 | | |
| Gerland | | | 1100 | | Bishop of Agrigento |
| Blessed Irmgard | 1025 | | 1100 | | |
| Blessed Richildis | | | 1100 | | |

== See also ==
The Editors of Encyclopædia Britannica. (2020). 'Vladimir I'. Retrieved from Britannica.com

Behind the Name. (2020). 'Andrew of Strumi'. Retrieved from Behind the Name

- Christianity in the 11th century
- 11th century saints
- Christianity saints finder
