= Áurea of San Millán =

Saint Aurea of San Millán
- Born: 1043; Villavelayo, Taifa of Zaragoza
- Died: 11 March 1070; San Millán de la Cogolla, Kingdom of Pamplona
- Venerated in: Roman Catholic Church
- Major shrine: Monastery of San Millán de la Cogolla, La Rioja, Spain, Europe
- Feast: 11 March
- Patronage: Villavelayo, La Rioja, Spain

Aurea or Oria (from the Latin: golden) (1043–1070), was a Spanish anchorite saint attached to the Monastery of San Millán de la Cogolla, in the Spanish Province of La Rioja (Europe). She is commemorated on 11 March.

== Life ==
Aurea was born in 1043 in the village of Villavelayo, then part of the Taifa of Zaragoza, a region controlled by the Moors. According to tradition, her mother was St. Amunia. As a child, she studied the Scriptures and the lives of the early martyrs of the Church under the guidance of a monk named Munio, who would later write her vita. Her favorite saints to meditate upon and to try to imitate were Agatha, Eulalia and Cecilia.

When she was aged nine, Amunia and Aurea decided to leave the world and to embrace a life of asceticism. They went to the Monastery of San Millán de la Cogolla, where they appealed to the prior, Dominic (later founder and namesake of the Abbey of Santo Domingo de Silos) for help in this. After some consideration as to how to proceed, for Aurea Prior Dominic had a narrow anchorhold built for her in the wall of the monastery church, with a small window through which she could see the altar, and another to the outside. He then consecrated her and had her walled into her new cell.

Aurea completely applied herself to the contemplative life. By the age of 20, she was living in a cave where she received a vision of her three favorite saints and was encouraged to follow her chosen lifestyle with more zeal. Eulalia gave her a pigeon, which image became connected to her, instructing her to follow it as an example of how she was to seek God. According to tradition, she performed many miracles and many people began to seek her advice and prayers. She supported herself by embroidering vestments for the monastery and baking hosts for the Mass.

Aurea did not live long after her visions. During the winter of 1070 she contracted a painful disease, in the course of which she sent for her tutor, Munio. At the time of her death, Aurea was twenty-seven years old. Her body was initially buried in her cave, which served as her shrine until 1609, when the bulk of her remains were enshrined at the monastery, with some being given to the parish church of her home town of Villavelayo, where a special chapel was built to house them and to honor her as the patron saint of the town.

A confraternity established to honor her cares for the shrine at the church and organizes an annual trip to the shrine at the monastery.

== Veneration ==
Gonzalo de Berceo, considered the first poet of the Spanish language, wrote an account of her life called the Vida de Santa Oria.
