= Valerio of Bierzo =

Spanish ascetic hermit and monk

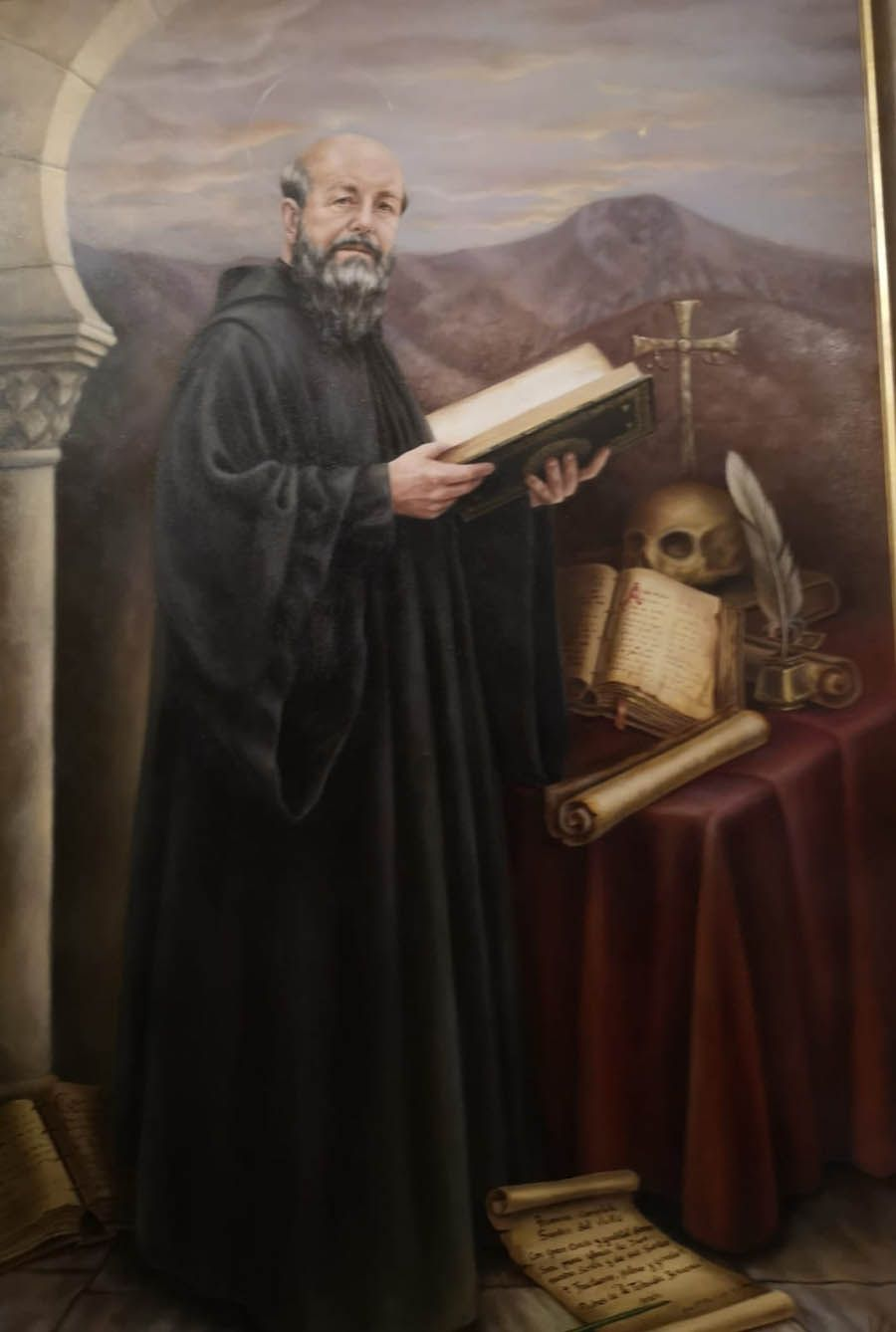
Valerio of Bierzo

Valerio of Bierzo (or Valerius of Bierzo; c. 630–c. 695) was an ascetic hermit and monk from the Bierzo region of Visigothic Spain. A number of his writings still survive, including three short autobiographical works in which he complains about his many sufferings.

== Life ==
Valerio was a member of the Visigothic aristocracy. In his writings Valerio describes how, after an eventful youth, he retired from the world seeking a more spiritual life. During one period he was a monk at the Monastery of Compludo, but this he abandoned in favour of a "desert hermitage" outside the city of Astorga, Spain. After falling out with a local priest, some well-wishers built a church for him on an estate called Ebronanto where he lived as a hermit in a cell by the altar, receiving food and other supplies from the family owning the estate. However, the head of this estate, a man called Ricimer, pulled the church down and built a new one, apparently with the intent of employing Valerio as a priest. But Valerio saw this as an attack by the devil, intent on destroying his reclusive life, and he was only spared when the church fell down and killed Ricimer. Later in life he was joined in another hermitage by his nephew and a servant, and the three men built a small church on the hillside next to their cells.

Valerio was connected in some way with the Abbey of San Pedro de Montes; he wrote for the monks there, and later writers mistakenly assumed that he had been abbot. An inscription, extant in the church of San Pedro, calls him "sanctus" (saint), which at that time was simply a title of honor.

== Works ==
A number of short works by Valerio survive. These works include: three brief accounts of visions of the afterlife as seen by three monks; a summary of a journey to the Holy Land by the fourth-century ascetic Egeria; some short works of monastic instruction; and a small body of poetry. Of particular historical value are three short autobiographical works which describe the difficulties and persecutions to which he was subjected at the hands of the local clergy and populace. These autobiographies particularly emphasize his sufferings, many of which he regarded as being directly inflicted by the devil.

One short hagiographical work known as the Vita Fructuosi (Life of Fructuosus of Braga), was from the 16th to the mid 20th century wrongly thought to have been written by Valerio.
