= Amunia of San Millán =

Spanish Benedictine hermit

Saint Amunia of San Millán Widow
- Born: Spain
- Died: 1069
- Venerated in: Roman Catholic Church
- Feast: March 11
- Tradition or genre: Benedictine

Saint Amunia of San Millán was a Benedictine hermit, from what is currently the La Rioja province in Northern Spain. She became a hermit after the death of her husband, following her daughter, St. Áurea, who was also a hermit. Both saints spent their contemplative lives at the Monastery of San Millán de la Cogolla in La Rioja. Amunia's feast day is March 11.
