= Monasteries in Spain =

Monasteries in Spain have a rich artistic and cultural tradition, and serve as testament to Spain's religious history and political-military history, from the Visigothic Period to the Middle Ages. The monasteries played an important role in the recruitment conducted by Christian aristocracy during and after the progress of the Reconquista, with the consequent decline in the Muslim south of the peninsula.

Their presence in the peninsula dates from the early centuries of Christianity, when the original hermit life gave rise to the formation of religious communities and the construction of small monasteries by Hispanics in the sixth and seventh centuries. Many of these buildings reflect the traditional style of Mozarabic.

The second phase was developed with the arrival of the Benedictines of Cluny, during the Reconquista and several new orders developed at this time: Cistercian, military orders, Premonstratensian, Carthusians, Jeromes, Augustinians, Camaldolese and beggars.

Monastic communities of various sizes sprang up from Catalonia to Galicia; some of these structures remain while others were abandoned or destroyed. Most of the monasteries in Spain are distributed in the northern half in line with the historical discourse of the zone in the Middle Ages. Monasteries are much less numerous in the south, Andalusia and the Canary Islands.

The establishment of monasteries during the Middle Ages was paramount from a social and cultural standpoint, benefiting the arts and agriculture.

The Camino de Santiago proved an important factor in locations of these monastic orders, as often an important objective was to support the pilgrims traveling along this route.

== Characteristics and evolution of the monastery in Spain ==
The first reference to a monastery in Spain was in a letter from St. Augustine to the abbot of the Monastery of Cabrera, written in 398. In 410, the monk Baquiario first used the term monastery in a text written in Hispania. He, as a monk, and Egeria, and the nun Etheria, perhaps more properly a consecrated virgin, were the first such members of religious houses whose names are known.

The first monasteries arose in the fourth century and were humble buildings erected in the shadow of shrines dedicated to or graves of beloved local martyrs. Many of these monastic people were troglodytes, or cave dwellers, as hermits or recluses who served as models for later monastic culture preferred to live in caves equipped to be shelters or shrines. Such is the origin of the monastery of San Millán de la Cogolla, which preserves as a shrine the cave where Aemilianus, also known as Millán, lived. The caves served as dwellings for disciples of this saint. The practice of living apart from the world was transformed by monks belonging to monasteries; although they lived in communities, the individuals within the community maintained their ascetic practice, living in a remote location, often in the desert.

The quantitative success of monasticism in the Visigothic period led to clashes with the secular clergy, and they brought this dispute to the Councils of Toledo. Much of this conflict derived from the social and economic benefits that were accorded as privileges of the monastic life. In some cases, as in the area of El Bierzo, monasteries, such as Compludo and Ruphianensi Monasterium, accepted whole families. Others which served as foundations of Fructuosus of Braga had the appearance of real villages. In other areas, such as Andalusia, monasteries were segregated by gender. Some sources also attributed more extreme features of the hermit movement, such as social protest, to the more extreme features of the hermit movement, especially in areas such as Burgos, Álava and Logroño. This is in parallel with other religious movements as heresy Priscillianist, which survived in Galicia and other areas into the sixth century.

In the following centuries, Hispanic monasteries emerged and expanded, developing their own set of similar characteristics, with a purely Hispanic artistic style. With the arrival of the monks of Cluny in the eleventh century, and the order of St. Benedict and observers of their rule, the Spanish monastery complex took on new importance and influence. This is the era of quintessential monastic life and notable edifices. Many of these clusters of buildings have survived to the modern era in various states of repair, although many are now used for purposes unrelated to monasticism. The political role of Cluny and its link with the monarchy and noble houses was decisive in the Europeanization of the Christian kingdoms of the mainland and the formation of feudal society in Spain.

With regard to the social and economic role of the Benedictine monasteries, the classic materialistic interpretations—that of a feudal lord overseeing and creating the monastery—are tempered by recent historiography. This study includes other aspects of the communities, such as inclusion in legal and sociological networks, using the methodology of cultural anthropology and microhistory.

Following the momentum of Cluny, Cistercians arrived with new works and reforms, followed by the Carthusians. In the thirteenth century the Franciscans and Dominicans, Premonstratensian and Jesuits, arrived. Some of these groups have remained quite monastic. During the sixteenth and seventeenth centuries, numerous monasteries and convents arose, such as the Monastery of the Valley of the Fallen.

Recent monasteries founded and built in Spain were:

- Monasterio de Santa María de Viaceli (Cóbreces, Cantabria), promoted and sponsored by the brothers Manuel and Antonio Bernaldo de Quirós and Pomar and Cistercian foundation in 1909
- Convent of San Lorenzo in Oñati, Guipuzcoa, in 1928
- Monastery of the Valley of the Fallen (Abbey of the Holy Cross in the Valley of the Fallen), 1940–1958, under draft Pedro Muguruza and Diego Mendez.
- House of Spirituality of the Dominican Fathers (Caleruega, Burgos), 1952.
- Roll Monastery (or Monastery of the Immaculate Conception) in Salamanca 1961, created by the architect Antonio Fernández Alba.
- Monasterio de Santa Maria de las Shallots (Hornachuelos, Córdoba), 1986

=== Foundations ===
Monasteries in this area were historically founded mainly by kings, bishops and nobles. There were a number of reasons individuals might found a monastery, largely self-serving ones: to reserve a burial there, which came with perpetual prayers by the monks on behalf of the founder's soul, sheltering a princess, widow, unmarried or bastard, in the case of kings. Sometimes there were political reasons for founding or protection of a particular monastery; many of the religious houses who protected were located in border areas where battles often raged, such as Castile and León or Navarre, as was the case Matallana monastery (in the Valladolid), or Bujedo-Navarre. Bishops had an interest in building a monastery on which to exercise their authority, especially in the feudal period, as this guaranteed an income. The nobility desired salvation for themselves and his family, plus a demonstration of political influence through sponsoring one of these great works. The monastic vows (poverty, chastity and obedience) were considered an appropriate vocation for younger sons, regardless of 6 or 7 the sincerity or otherwise of his vocation, in order to reduce the likelihood of disputes over the inheritance of the firstborn, who would then hold undivided estates according to the institution of primogeniture. This close identification between the clergy and nobility, both privileged classes, survived as an enduring connection during the Middle Ages and the Modern Age to the end of the ancien regime.

Other monasteries arose without intervention from the above-mentioned members of society, when a community formed around a shrine. This is the case of the monastery of San Juan de Ortega which originally was a humble chapel founded by the saint to preserve relics of St. Nicholas of Bari Over time, sufficient people arrived to care for the shrine to require the formation of an official community. Or from hermits, in some cases doubling, that were left to be guided by any rule, as the Royal Monastery of Santa María de Vallbona (Vallbona de les Monges), the monastery of Santo Domingo de Ocaña (Toledo) of the sixteenth century has the distinction of being founded by a neighbor who wanted to be close to the preachers.

There are recent foundations, of the twentieth century, whose intent is very clear from the outset, as is the spiritual community of the Dominican Fathers of Caleruega (Burgos), in 1952, destined for the convent-school-house of spirituality. The Monastery of Our Lady of the Angels of Palma de Mallorca, in 1914, can be included as a religious house of education, as it was conceived as a major seminary, Novitiate House, Ecumenical Centre College and routinely providing Evangelical Protestants Lutheran Germans.

=== The first Hispanic monasteries ===
During the sixth and seventh centuries, the Hispanic Visigoth cultures are evidenced in a wealth of monastic communities in which ancient tradition still flourished and where the monks themselves supported monastic rule by living it. Many monasteries arose in this period.

Some sources consider the Monastery of St. Victorian of Asan (in Sobrarbe, Huesca province) as the first monastery founded in Spain, but more likely, given the existence of references to previous monasteries, the first initiative for foundation of churches sprang from the Visigoth king Gesalec in 506. Other possible inspirations are attributed to Swabians in the northwest, with the activity of San Martín de Dumio, from Pannonia. Other founding saints such as San Donato, came from Africa Játiva. San Fructuoso de Braga founded the monastery of Compludo in the early seventh century and twenty other foundations from Galicia to Andalusia. During the same century, San Leandro and his brother St. Isidore composed their own monastic rules.

Morphologically, Hispanic monasteries are clearly distinguished by two concepts:

- Enclosing the community, which is known by the name of claustra
- Cloistered units, called domus.

The cloister was an enclosure that isolated and protected the monastery and its residents, which is very important to the religious life being cultivated. In one chapter, the San Isidoro rule states: "The mill of the monastery on its premises only have one door and one wicket to leave the garden."

It was later advised that the city remain separate from the cloister, and respect that separation. This suggests the building of an enclosure or wall surrounding the buildings and gardens of the monastery. This first is called monastic enclosure or cloister.

The second concept is referred to the domus, i.e. the group of houses which constitute the monastery. Documents refer to two different places within the monasteries: domus domorum, or ultimate home, which refers to the church building, and maior domus, which is the served as bedrooms and community activities. According to the surviving descriptions and annotations, the maior domus should be a dependency of high architectural quality and large size, standing next to the church, at the height of the atrium.

In the domus as a whole, there were several required dwellings such as the cilla, nursing, the punishment cell, the novitiate, the gatekeeper's shelter. What would be called a chapter house centuries later among the Benedictines was referred to at this time as a conference room in these early Hispanic monasteries. Many documents mention this space and its utility but historians are not certain where it was located. It is known that minor issues monks gathered in the choir.

Documentation of these early Hispanic monasteries is abundant and descriptive. However, only a few of the cloisters have been preserved; the remainder of the sites are lost and archaeological evidence is inconclusive.

=== Repopulation of the monasteries ===
Many monasteries arose in the tenth century on land reclaimed in hitherto barren areas, no man's land, or abandoned places in the basin of the Duero and Bierzo in León. The monasteries might construct new buildings or small churches, or restore those crumbling and neglected earlier that new monks transformed and supplemented with monastic dependencies. In many cases, these areas were found to be inhabited by small groups, pastoralists, and farmers attached to their land.

The monks who created this kind of monastery came from both the South (especially Cordoba, at a time of persecution of Christians in that city) and the North, bringing with them the influence of their region of origin, but without forgetting the traditional Spanish-Gothic forms. The architectural heritage survived almost two centuries despite the abandonment will be restored by these people repopulating. The lands of the Duero valley will witness the revival of architecture over the neo-visigothic 10th and 11th centuries, while the first Romanesque building started in Catalan lands in the year 1000. This is demonstrated in small churches, the only remains of the monasteries of that period that have survived until today (2008).

Many of these religious buildings took advantage of those surviving from the Visigothic period and mosques, especially in Aragon first and, later, Andalusia.

==== Building components and ornaments ====
Buildings of this age have much in common, so some generalizations can be made about elements of construction and ornamentation.

Primary materials are rubble, stone and wood. Walls are constructed of either masonry or courses of stone blocks. The latter is typical of places with nearby quarries, as slate is often used where it is common. When the building is of masonry, lintels, corners and windows will be reinforced with stone blocks.

Vaults, roofs, arches and columns often presented a problem. The builders' ideal was to construct ceilings in stone barrel vault, but this was not always possible, whether because of the high cost of the labor or other technical difficulties. Very few edifices managed to use barrel vaults throughout the building; stone vaulting was often used only in the apses and wooden framing was used in the remainder of the building. Smaller churches tried vaulting, but were forced to economize with poor materials, such as tufa stone, brick and masonry.

The horseshoe arch design of the vaults is in the tradition of Asturian architecture with some influence from Visigothic art, and in some cases following influence of the Mozarabic Cordoba. The influence of Cordoba art on these buildings is manifested in the ribbed vaults.

Santiago de Peñalba is an example of Mozarabic alfiz arches.

The arch is a common architectural design, though the Moorish horseshoe arch differs from the Spaniard in that it cannot be close to 2/3 of the ratio Sometimes the same building may include both styles, as in San Miguel de Escalada.

The columns utilize techniques used in other buildings and styles, usually Romans. Its discovery by the builders, ownership and carry is a fact and the usual great convenience. Sometimes come from places far from their final destination. Many of the capitals are also reused, those developed specifically for the building following a Corinthian tradition of drawing the characteristic necking stranded (such as wreathed Asturias).

Ornamental architecture did not reach any large development. Eaves were decorated, and the openings of the windows filled with intricate stone lattices. Many times the doors and windows were framed with alfiz. But there are very many entries as a decoration paramental, they are of all kinds; funeral, consecration, foundation, etc. Are written in neat handwriting and on the basis of maintaining quality material, usually marble.

==== Painting ====
Painting was the final step in construction of a church; the building was not considered finished until the walls were painted inside and out. Only a few traces of paint have been preserved over the centuries since, not only is paint the least resistant decorative element over time but also nineteenth century restorations removed or covered up these murals. If the exterior was plastered, the plastering was often scraped off to reveal the underlying material. This trend continued throughout the twentieth century and continues into the twenty-first century.

Buildings were often painted with a specific tone and the details on arches, moldings, capitals, imposts and other architectural components would have been picked out in a different color. It is known that the Church of Santiago de Peñalba had a red painted base, 73 cm in height, both outside and inside.

==== Geographical locations of churches of the repopulation ====
- Monasterio de San Miguel de Escalada, in the province of León, which was founded by the abbot who arrived from Cordoba, existed at the time of Alfonso III. It was an ancient temple dedicated to San Miguel. The monastery was consecrated in 913 by Bishop Gennadius of Astorga.
- Monasterio de San Cebrián de Mazote in Valladolid, a town in of Mazote San Cebrián, founded during the reign of Ordoño II by monks who came from Cordoba.
- Monasterio de San Román de Hornija. It is known from documents, Chindasvinto died in 653 and was buried in a monastery that existed here. In the twelfth century it was a priory of the monastery of San Pedro de Montes in the region of Bierzo, León.

=== Cluny in Spain ===
The church of Santa Maria de Piasca (Cantabria) is one of the most important priories in the service of the Cluniac monastic order of Sahagún.

In Catalonia, the abbot Oliba had strong ties with the Abbey of Cluny, but it was strictly a spiritual relationship, and had no legal connotations. Via this abbot, King Sancho III of Navarre established relations with the abbot St. Odilon de Cluny, which resulted in a Cluniac abbot being put in charge of the monastery of San Juan de la Peña. As a result of this action the Cluniac influence spread through monasteries that were in the domains of Sancho III. The spiritual relationship with the Abbey of Cluny continued with the descendants of Sancho III until the reign of King Alfonso VI with whom the relationship moved from being a purely spiritual sympathy to one which has economic ties and political and religious influences. The monastery of Sahagún in León was a central one, as it was the biggest propagator of the Cluniac observance. Alfonso VI became the center of Cluny and became its protector. It was called "The Spanish Cluny", the abbey being more powerful in the kingdoms of León and Castile, which had nearly 100 monasteries. Alfonso was owner of the land ranging from the Cantabrian Sea to the River Duero. Sahagun was a central influence in Spain of the eleventh and twelfth centuries.

=== The Cistercians in Spain ===
The Moreruela monastery (Zamora) was the first Cistercian enclave on the Iberian Peninsula; it was founded in 1133 in the reign of Alfonso VII, followed by the Fitero in 1140, Santa María de Sobrado, 1142, (in Sobrado dos Monxes, La Coruña) and the monastery of Poblet (1150) in Catalonia, sponsored by Count Ramón Berenguer IV of Barcelona. Moruela was part of the great Cistercian group of abbeys consisting of Clairvaux (in the valley of Absinthe, France), the Great Forest (in Languedoc), Fontfreda (near Narbonne) and Poblet. The first cloister for women was that of Santa Maria de la Caridad in Tulebras (Navarra). From this monastery, nuns departed to found the communities of Perales (Palencia), of Gradefes, Cañas (La Rioja), Trasobares in Zaragoza, Vallbona, Lleida and Las Huelgas in Burgos. Cistercian monasteries, both female and male, spread throughout the peninsula.

=== Monasteries of the mendicant orders ===
The mendicant orders (also called preachers) emerged in the early thirteenth century, with the Dominicans and Franciscans. They emerged as a spiritual response, necessary in a time when monastic orders had relaxed the norms and behavior. These mendicant orders proposed a novel mode of action based on direct action toward the faithful and the organizational system that was based on division by provinces. The convents and monasteries of these monks were always very close to or within cities. They were also placed alongside roads, especially in the Camino de Santiago, in order to provide care and support to travelers.

The complex of buildings used for the mendicant groups is in keeping with the usual monastic style, but differences arise according to the needs and the work of these monks. Many of the foundation buildings were donations of houses more or less adapted to life in community. The churches were built specifically for the monastic community, or in some cases expanding some existing chapel or shrine), with its own characteristics. The building's acoustics were a primary criterion in construction, as the sermons and talks with the faithful were common practice. Churches were divided into two parts, one for those attending mass and another for the monks' enclosures. These churches did not continue a distinct style but adapted to the current fashion and geographical needs. Another feature was the small number of chapels in the wings, in contrast to the Cistercian churches. This is because the rules do not oblige each monk to say daily Mass, quite the contrary. Francis of Assisi said in the General Chapter "In places where the monks dwell be held one Mass a day [...] but if somewhere has many priests, with a love of charity is happy listening to the mass of the other."

Construction materials are typically poor, with a few severe facade sculptures, a polygonal apse with large window openings. The monasteries adapted and assimilated local building traditions to the community's needs, so churches vary depending on geographic location. In Spain there were two models: buildings with a Latin cross and buildings with a single nave with chapels between buttresses.

In Navarre there was a proliferation of mendicant convents during the reign of Champagne, especially with Theobald II was defined as chief patron and protector. In Castilla y León were many convents but most which have survived to the twenty-first century are badly deteriorated.

=== Paired Monasteries ===
Paired monasteries were those made jointly by male and female communities, within the High Middle Ages achieved considerable importance. These monasteries had their origin in the monasteries turned into family homes where whole families decided to benefit from religious rules and form a monastic community whose members lived out their lives without leaving the house. It was a kind of exalted fashion and later came to commit errors and excesses such that they were reprimanded by the religious leaders. There was a text, Regula Communis, written for these monasteries. This rule made clear the changes in architectural design made necessary by this combining of communities: all spaces should be double so that the female community was separated from the male; they might share only the chapter, but must sit apart. As for the bedrooms, not only ordered that they were separated but well away from each other.

In time, these monasteries came to be officially removed, but still, in the twelfth century, a group of thirty-one nuns nicknamed tuquinegras lived with a large number of monks, men who were supposed to protect and who were known by the name of milites. No buildings have been preserved from these monastic communities other than the churches.

=== Monasteries of military orders ===
The Military Orders built their own monasteries which served also as a fortress of defense, though otherwise the houses followed the monastic premise as other monasteries did. A typical example of this type of monastery is the Calatrava la Nueva, headquarters of the Order of Calatrava founded by the Abbot of Fitero, Raymond, at the behest of King Sancho III of Castile, to protect the area restored to the Muslims. Other orders as Order of Santiago, Knights Templar and Canons of the Holy Sepulchre devoted much of their efforts to protect and care for pilgrims on the Camino de Santiago.

- Monasterio de Uclés (in the current province of Cuenca) was the headquarters of the Order of Santiago since 1174.
- Montesa Castle (now the province of Valencia) came from the Aragonese Order of Montesa.
- The Conventual de San Benito de Alcántara was of the Order of Alcántara.
- Ponferrada Castle of the Knights Templar.

=== The monasteries on the Camino de Santiago ===
Although many monasteries emerged along the Camino de Santiago, some have disappeared altogether. Typical of the monasteries' aid to travelers are the thirty-two hospitals or hospices governed by a small community of monks belonging to different orders, but many of the monasteries of this route have also attached their own hospitals. Here is a list of the most important monasteries of this route:

==== Huesca ====
- San Juan de la Peña. Affiliated with the Aragonese monarchs and Navarre.

==== Navarra ====
- Leyre Monastery, Benedictine, the focus of the Reconquista and refuge of kings and bishops of Navarre. It has an attached guesthouse for pilgrims.
- Convento de Santo Domingo (Estella), foundation of Theobald II of Navarre in 1259.
- Monastery of Our Lady the Royal Irache, which is not along the road's route but in a detour from Ayegui. It is one of the oldest Benedictine monasteries in Navarre; it is possibly of Visigoth design. The hospital was founded by García Sánchez III of Navarre in 1051.

==== La Rioja ====
- Convent of San Anton in Navarrete, of which only ruins remain.
- Monastery of Santa María la Real de Nájera, founded by García I of León along with a hospital for pilgrims. Alfonso VI joined the monastery at Cluny in 1079, to promote the pilgrimage, in opposition to the bishop of Nájera who moved to Calahorra in protest. This monastery is the tomb of the kings of Navarre. It has been run by Franciscan friars since 1895.
- Cañas Monastery (home of Santo Domingo de Silos). Female Cistercian abbey founded in 1170.

==== Burgos ====
- Monastery of San Félix de Oca on the hill of San Felices which dates from the ninth century. In 1049, it was annexed to San Millán de la Cogolla. According to tradition, Diego Porcelos, the founder of the city of Burgos, is buried here. The apse is the only remaining structure from this monastic community.
- Monastery of San Juan de Ortega. San Juan de Ortega founded this place to resemble a pilgrims' hospital rather than a monastery. In 1170, Alfonso VIII relinquished the hospital to the jurisdiction of Burgos, and in 1432 the Church of Burgos took over the Order of St. Jerome.
- Monastery of San Juan Evangelista, outside of Burgos, a former hospital complex that Alfonso VI began in 1091 under the protection of the Benedictine Abbey of Chaise-Dieu in the Haute-Loire, with San Lesmes as prior. Only the chapter house and cloister remain of the monastery, while only the facade remains of the church convent.
- Monastery of las Huelgas, which ran the King's Hospital, founded by Alfonso VI on behalf of the pilgrims.
- The Benedictine monastery of Rocamador was dependent on donations and privileges granted by Alfonso XI of Castile. It was founded to assist pilgrims with a difficult passage between Hornillos del Camino to Castrojeriz.
- Convent of San Antón de Castrojeriz. This convent was founded by Alfonso VII of León and Castile in 1146 for the Order of St. Anthony, of French origin. The monastery had been reduced to ruins in the fourteenth century with the exception of a Gothic arch to the left of the great portal, under which the road passed.
- The Cistercian monastery of Castrojeriz emerged in conjunction with the Pilgrims' Hospital founded by Count Nuño Pérez de Lara and his wife Teresa. It was near the Fitero Bridge (Pons Fiteria) the river Pisuerga.

==== Palencia ====
- The Benedictine monastery, founded by the lady Mayor in 1035 in the town of Frómista, of which remains only the church of San Martín, a good example of the Romanesque architecture of the twelfth century.
- Monastery of Santa Clara (Carrión de los Condes), founded in the thirteenth century.
- Former Abbey of Santa Maria de Benevívere, twelfth century. Only ruins remain.
- Monastery of San Zoilo, on the Carrión river near Carrión de los Condes, a great center of refuge for pilgrims; the tombs of the Infantes of Carrión are located here.
- Monastery of Santa María de las Tiendas, also founded in the eleventh century, belonging to the order of Santiago, near Tiendas. Only vestiges of the monastery remain, which the present farmhouse incorporates.

==== Leon ====
- Monastery of San Benito el Real de Sahagun, whose Cluniac monks arrived in 1080. This was the main abbey on the peninsula, which expanded to 60 beds for pilgrims in their own hospital.
- Monastery of San Agustin in Mansilla de las Mulas, disappeared, leaving only the Arco de San Agustín near Pilgrim Street.

==== Lugo ====
- Samos Monastery, Benedictine, with a shelter for pilgrims of high rank. The masses were housed in separate houses of the abbey.
- Monastery of la Magdalena, in Sarria, founded by two Italian priests of the Order of St. Augustine. As of 2007, this monastery is in charge of priests belonging to the Orden de la Merced, and as is traditional, welcome pilgrims. Their adjunct hospital had a reputation for caring for pilgrims.
- Monastery of Santa María de Loio, in the small village of Loio Lugo. The hermit dwelling was restored by a monk named Limerick. It was the birthplace of the Knights of Santiago to 1170. Almost no traces of its original location remain.
- Monastery of Villar de Donas, past a place called Ligondé, it is necessary to deviate from the road to get here. It was originally a small convent for members of the Arias family of Monterroso and in 1184 belonged to the Order of Santiago. In 2007, only the church, which houses paintings from the fourteenth century, remains standing.

==== La Coruña ====
- Monastery of San Martín Pinario in Santiago de Compostela, former Benedictine monastery, now a major seminary.
- Caaveiro Monastery, in the Fragas do Eume.
- Monastery of Sancti Spiritus (Melide) at the front entrance to the Melide Hospital. All that remains is the Romanesque church of Santa Maria, which dates from the eighth century, and is the current parish.
- Augustinian Convent (Arzúa) with its own hospital in the town of Arzúa; all that remains is church of the Magdalene and part of the fabric of the hospital.

=== Palaces in monasteries ===
The royal palace in this institution is one of the characteristics of the Spanish monastery.

Occasionally, already constructed buildings were willingly converted into a palace. Such is the case of Tordesillas, Miraflores and Paular. In other instances, the monastery offered a residence to the king or the nobility when they traveled for matters relating to their own Reconquista or to follow the travels of the courts of Castile and Aragon. In some monasteries the palatial residence required building a new building inside the compound, as in the monasteries of Poblet, Carracedo and Yuste. The monastery of El Escorial was conceived from the beginning with a specific architecture and set of structures to house the monks and the king and his court.

=== Monasteries as palaces ===
Many Spanish monasteries were built from scratch in order to house the tombs of royal families or members of the nobility. To this end, the patrons made large donations of land, money and men. During the Middle Ages and the Renaissance, it was considered of vital importance that the monks keep in their prayers the memory of the dead buried near them in churches, cloisters, or cemeteries, and not only consider this important for the salvation of souls but as a perpetual reminder to future generations how important those buried were. Among the great monasteries which possessed noble or royal mausoleums are:

- San Juan de la Peña and San Pedro el Viejo in Huesca, in which are buried the kings of Aragon until Aragon joined Catalonia. In the aforementioned monastery, kings of kingdom of Pamplona are buried, when the territory was part of Navarre.
- Santes Creus and Poblet, kings of the Crown of Aragon.
- Ripoll, with the counts of Barcelona, before its union with Aragon.
- Najera and Leyre, monasteries elected by the dynasties of Navarra.
- San Isidoro de León, at which are buried many of the Kings of Leon.
- San Salvador de Oña (Burgos), converted into a county and regional cemetery in the second half of the twelfth century.
- Las Huelgas Reales de Burgos, chosen by the Castilian monarchs.
- Cartuja de Miraflores at Burgos, where Juan II of Castile chose to be buried, along with his second wife and his son Alfonso.
- The Salesians in Madrid, where lies Fernando VI (the founder) and his wife Barbara of Braganza.
- El Escorial, considered as a prototype for the funeral aspects, but is the most modern of all. There are the mausoleums of the royal families of the Habsburg and Bourbon.
- San Román de Hornija, in Valladolid, which was originally a monastery founded by Chindasvinto Visigoth for his own burial and his wife Reciberga (or Reciwerga).

Among the monasteries, cemeteries and burial of the family of the nobility, there are:

- Loeches Monastery where are buried the Count-Duke of Olivares and his descendants the Dukes of Alba. This is a side chapel.
- San Francisco de Guadalajara, where the Dukes of Infantado built a crypt.
- San Jerónimo de Granada, whose founder, Grand Master, declined to be buried there.
- San Jerónimo de Cotalba in Alfahuir, (Valencia), in which are buried the Infantes Don Juan and Doña Blanca de Aragón.
- Monastery of Parral in Segovia, which holds the tomb of the Marquis de Villena.
- Monastery of Santa Paula in Seville, with the Marquis de Montemayor.
- Santa María la Real de Nájera, which has an important pantheon of the Knights.
- Porta Coeli monastery in Valladolid, in which is buried its promoter and benefactor Rodrigo Calderón, Count of Oliva, favorite of the Duke of Lerma.
- Monastery of San Pedro de Cardena, where El Cid was buried and where his wife and daughters took refuge during his exile). In the War of Independence, the monastery was sacked by the French army and his grave desecrated.

=== Monasteries (or convents) as a learning center ===
Some religious communities have education as their main activity. The agencies and the religious way of life is no different from other monasteries, only instead of cultivating the land, their work is channeled to instruction and education. Examples of such religious houses are the Convent of Santo Domingo as the University of Orihuela (known as the Colegio de Santo Domingo) and the convent of San Esteban de Murcia.

The major universities (University of Salamanca, Universidad de Valladolid and University of Alcalá) were closely linked to the regular clergy by religious orders who controlled their schools, mostly Dominicans and Augustinians, and the Jesuits from the sixteenth century. In university towns, there were important monastic or conventual foundations, such as the Dominican Convent of San Esteban de Salamanca.

=== Urbanised Monasteries or Convents ===
Some monasteries and convents are located within developed areas; these tend to belong to the so-called mendicant orders, but should not be taken as a general rule. Occasionally, religious houses were built adjacent to communities, neither inside the community or in the countryside, such as Benedictines and Cistercians, and occasionally small hermitages.

These urban monasteries are similar to traditional monasteries but have their own architectural characteristics. The buildings are not in most cases surrounded by a wall or fence that isolates, the only walls being those that encircle the garden or orchard. The windows look out onto the streets of the city so it is necessary to protect those inside with blinds. Secular residents of the surrounding community have direct access to the building of the church inside of which there is a closed off area for the monks or nuns. Inside the church, the pulpit becomes a central element because these congregations have as a main goal to instruct and speak directly to the faithful.

There are other elements that distinguish convents from monasteries Female convents there are other elements that characterize them, as the existence of a wheel, the only element of contact the religious residents of the community have with the outside. The church building sometimes has an elevated choir and a choir under the feet or a choir under the side of the chancel, separated by a communion rail.

Most of these urban monasteries proliferated during the sixteenth and seventeenth centuries throughout the Spanish territory.

=== Decline of the Spanish monasteries ===
Many of the Hispanic monasteries were abandoned, forgotten and lost, over time. The medieval monasteries were maintained, although some were plundered and burned, to recover from these tragedies only with new reconstructions.

The nineteenth century was crucial for the conservation of these monastic buildings. The Spanish War of Independence brought many calamities; French soldiers were quartered in the buildings in some cases the churches were turned into stables or kitchens. Fires were set for heating and cooking, with the inevitable consequences. Many of the tombs were desecrated in search of possible treasures or for the mere pleasure of destroying, apart from robbery and theft of works of art in wartime. In some cases, it was believed that the destruction would bring about social transformation, as was the case with the demolition of thirty-seven convents in Madrid and the convent of San Francisco (Valladolid).

After years of peace, and of building restoration and recovery of scattered pieces, monasteries were again involved in the events of the Carlist Wars, the identification of the Carlist and the clergy, most notably the burning of convents and monasteries in 1835, which included a massacre of monks. Finally, in this century, the various confiscations ended with the realized heritage of most medieval monasteries. Many of their churches were spared because they took on a new life by becoming parishes. In some cases, other provincial institutions and individuals came forward to museums with recovered pieces, including parts of the churches' architecture. The monastic ruins went on to become a commonplace instance of romanticism, and poets and musicians seeking inspiration in them; notable artists include Frédéric Chopin and George Sand in the Cartuja de Valldemossa and the Bécquer brothers Gustavo and Valeriano in the Cistercian Monastery Veruela (Zaragoza).

In the last quarter of the nineteenth century, with the Restoration, there was a political climate more favorable to the founding of new religious orders and the restoration of the old. Some monasteries were able to revive the monastic life.

In the first third of the twentieth century, political and social critical junctures brought back to light the old Spanish anticlericalism which culminated in Tragic Week in Barcelona in 1909. In 1910, the Law of the lock prevented the establishment of new religious congregations. In 1931, shortly after the proclamation of the Second Spanish Republic, came a new burning of convents, but much more serious was the destruction during the Spanish Civil War, with thousands of victims among the clergy.

In the last quarter century, both the Spanish state and companies became aware of the great ruined monastic heritage was lost, great buildings abandoned or poorly maintained but still remained standing part of its architecture and began the quest to give them a meaning and relevance, such as rehabilitation for museums, cultural centers, or schools.

== The architectural complex of Spanish monasteries ==
The monastery and its dependencies eventually consolidated with the Benedictine Order of Cluny in Romanesque period in the early Middle Ages. The monks of Cluny spread throughout Europe and founded the monasteries whose architectural structure would henceforth be an example to follow, with minor variations in some monastic orders, taking into account possible regional differences.

=== External Signs of buildings ===
In many monasteries and convents it was traditional to construct a transept and small chapels that served as a shrine, located in the vast expanse of the garden. Fountains and wells which is usually open in the center or side of the courtyard.

A common image was that of the patron saint of the warrant or the title holder of the church. Sometimes the title is kept original to the foundation of the monastery and sometimes switches to receive the relics of a saint local or foreign.

Sculptural decoration shields were common, signifying the monastic order as appropriate, those of kings or noble founders or sponsors, bishops (where applicable) and the arms of the city. It is also common to see figures representing the founder.

An important addition is the tower or steeple with a bell serving as the municipal clock. The language of the bells was very important during the Middle Ages and Renaissance as well as representing the time, as was the town crier announcing events.

=== The church ===
The churches of the monasteries have some features that differentiate them from those of secular clergy, especially in regard to the chorus, vestries and penitential cells. In all other respects, they follow the same rules and practice space is dedicated to the liturgy, with the center of spiritual life and religious communities.

Churches are always oriented to the east, like other Christian churches (except in cases where the place names force a placement). Its plan is a Latin cross transept and apse or apses. They usually have three gates: the main foot, which gives access to outdoor and one in the side wall to access the cloister, used exclusively by the monks, and a third located in the transept, which leads to the sacristy.

==== Side chapels and shrines ====
Monasteries placed several chapels or simple altars in small spaces due to the requirement that the monks had to say daily Mass each. However, in the convents, this need did not exist because there was only one chaplain for the entire community. This reasoning applies to the sacristy, which were more spacious in monasteries than convents.

==== Presbytery ====
The altar would be placed in this part of the church. Placement of the altar was usually connected with a sculpture of the patron saint of the monastery. In some religious houses, this image is tucked into a niche suitable for pilgrims to visit, such as the monastery of the Virgin of Guadalupe.

==== Choir ====
The choir was customarily located in the middle of the nave in the Spanish monasteries, separated from the chancel by the transept. It might also be located in the apse behind the main altar, surrounded by a circular wall. The choir in the middle of the church is an enclosed space that is usually surrounded by a screen. Inside, it is furnished with seating with ornamentation used to instruct artists. Both armrests and backs are profusely decorated with carvings that are iconographic animal symbols, mythology, allegories, genre scenes and so on. In the center of the choir is lectern furniture that supports the great liturgical choral music book, written in large characters that can be read from afar by the monks. The organ was placed in a lateral.

=== The cloister ===
The quintessential medieval Spanish cloister is the Benedictine whose pattern spread throughout Christian Europe. Its construction consists of four galleries called pandas, one of them attached to the south or north nave of the church. One gallery is dedicated always to the chapter house and another small unit. The west gallery houses usually the cilla and laymen, and the gallery border to the church has the refectory and kitchen calefactory. In some monasteries, the profundis room is replaced by the refectory where the monks chant Psalm "De profundis ad te Dominum clamavi ..." Psalm 130 (129)

=== Infirmaries, herbal medicine and herb garden ===
One of Saint Benedict's foremost edicts concerned caring for the ill indigent residents around the monasteries. To this end, the monasteries established hospitals both inside the monastery grounds and elsewhere in the community. Inside the monastery, there was an infirmary which treated the friars themselves and on occasion, ill visitors. As a complement to this infirmary, monasteries often had stores of herbal or botanic medicines, supplied by the monastery's garden. In some cases, this infirmary and associated medical stores might expand beyond the needs of the monastery and the surrounding community. This is true of the monastery of Santo Domingo de Silos, which was founded in 1705 at the request of the town of Silos. It became a famous chemist and recognized in the region, which is today quite well preserved; it is a museum for those who wish to study what these infirmaries were like. One particular display is that of a collection of jars produced in Talavera de la Reina, for the center, with the coat of arms of the monastery.

There are many documents about these aromatic gardens cultivated by the monks. In the monastery of Santa Maria de Matallana in the province of Valladolid, reconstruction of the ruins revealed the space that monks had devoted to this garden, growing plants. Another major herbarium was the monastery of San Julián de Samos in the province of Lugo.

The apothecaries were served by the monks, themselves specialized. They carried out all relevant tasks for the manufacture of medicines, ointments, and spirits both medicinal and otherwise. Many of these pharmacies have conserved tools such as the stills used for distillation.

=== Scriptorium and library ===
In the High and Late Medieval period, much learning and literature was in the hands of the monasteries. It was there that knowledge was preserved, books were copied and translations made. Many of these monasteries had a scriptorium in addition to a library, furnished with benches, desks and shelves and equipped with pens, parchment, inks and other tools needed for writing and painting miniatures. Judging by the illuminated manuscripts preserved in Catalonia, there is evidence that desks were abundant. The Royal Monastery of Santa María de Vallbona had not only a significant library but some furniture of the period.

The library of the monastery of Montserrat has 400 incunabula, despite the ravages of time, and the Real Monasterio de Nuestra Senora de Rueda in Aragon still retains its scriptorium space.

Another significant library of the period was that of Santa María de Huerta, Soria, built in the twelfth century and decorated in the seventeenth. In the monastery of Valvanera, the rich library survives, in which there are records which refer to the Polyglot Bible Valvanera, which Philip II removed to El Escorial where it was destroyed in a fire. In Galicia, the famous monastery of San Julián de Samos had a great library that was burned in a fire in the late twentieth century.

=== Cemetery for monks ===
Usually the monks were buried in the cloisters' crypt. The Cistercian monks were buried directly in the ground (without a coffin) and face down. The abbots were buried in the chapter house.

=== Other units ===
One of the most important areas in a monastery is the garden, large or small. It supplied both food and a place for monks to come do penance or for spiritual retreats. The large monasteries had similarly large gardens with all kinds of facilities, from fountains, canals and wells. In some minor orders, the gardens had simply small chapels or oratories.

Sometimes inns were built outside the closure area. Over time and with the growing authority of the abbot, the religious houses were wont to build their own house, where the abbot might receive important guests.

Larger monasteries provided not only the means for the monks' subsistence but for a strong local economic base, with workshops, foundries, mills, potteries, wineries, and other small businesses.

== Heritage ==
Despite the great vicissitudes suffered by the Spanish monasteries—fire, theft, plundering, confiscations, laziness—there still remains still a considerable heritage of artistic furnishings.

The monasteries tried to move away from the heritage of austerity required of ascetics, without exhibiting any external signs of wealth. Maintaining this position was virtually impossible because of the desire of lay founders, sponsors and donors that their gifts be visible as indications of their power, generosity and position. All these monasteries developed a rich collection of art, and this display did not escape the strictest order in this regard, the Carthusian Order.

In the Renaissance and Baroque period, the great chapel altars and those of smaller subsidiary chapels, following the new concept of post-Counter liturgical life. Thus arose the sculpted altarpieces, such as that by Damián Forment in the monastery of Poblet, which resulted in such an extravagant expenditure that the monks rebelled against the abbot. Another example of a huge altarpiece was in the monastery of San Benito el Real de Valladolid, a masterpiece of Berruguete Alonso, which is kept at present at the National Museum of Sculpture in the city.

The vestries were enriched not only with the necessary furniture but adorned with works of famous painters, often in valuable frames. Also paintings of kings and nobility often hung on the walls of the churches or cloisters as symbols of or to attract their patronage.

Many monasteries have liturgical pieces, and large pieces of jewelry displayed in glass cases along with textile items, such as vestments and clothing. Some monasteries are by themselves a veritable museum of art, like the Descalzas Real in Madrid. Others have opened up within its walls (taking advantage of old farms) where to place a museum and recovered missing pieces, such is the case of Poblet whose museum occupies the area that was the Palace of King Martin the Humane in Poblet. Counted among their treasure are valuable books.

== Some notable monasteries ==
Some monasteries have historical significance or are simply interesting. The short listing here does not imply that these monasteries are the best or most important, but simply interesting histories.

=== Monastery of San Benito el Real de Sahagún ===
This monastery was important enough that it was referred to as the Spanish Cluny. It was the most powerful and influential Benedictine monastery of the Middle Ages in the Kingdom of León. It was protected and promoted by King Alfonso VI which, among other privileges granted to preserve the protected Urraca also gave the monastery the right to mint its own currency and the Jews of the town as vassals by King Alfonso VII. Its heritage spanned the provinces of León, Valladolid, Palencia, Zamora and Cantabria, thus counting a far larger number of subjects under their jurisdiction than the holdings of other important figures of the time. From the religious point of view, Sahagun was the center from which sprang at the behest of Pope Gregory VII the new Roman liturgy which replaced Spanish Mozarabic Rite. Father Sandoval and Father Yepes listed fifty to sixty monasteries and a large number of churches which depended on Sahagún. The monastery's influence stretched from Toledo and from Cantabria Rioja to Galicia.

=== Monastery of San Benito el Real Valladolid ===
Its founding in 1389 brought a new reform of the Benedictine order under the royal protection of Juan I and the blessing of Pope Clement VII; the "black monks" had relaxed their strictures, forgetting Saint Benedict's strictures so far as to sleep outside the monasteries. This monastery instilled its members with a respect for the example of Saint Benedict. The cloister was the property of the monastery, not only from the spiritual perspective but the physical, with a double gate installed in the entries. The principle was established with toughness and authority of perpetual abstinence, fasting and severity in the monk's practice and in their habitations; it also enforced generosity to the needy in the form of sharing food, money and fuel. Valladolid took the lead in the fifteenth century reforms of the Benedictine orders in Spain, and other Benedictine monasteries became dependent on it Valladolid, as did the Congregation of San Benito de Valladolid, after the papal bull of Pope Alexander VI. To this end, many chapters drafted the relevant constitutions.

=== Monastery of Poblet ===
Poblet was founded by the Count of Barcelona Ramon Berenguer IV. It was one of the four great Cistercian abbeys of Christendom, along with Clairvaux, in Absinthe, France; the Great Forest, in Languedoc; and Fontfreda, near Narbonne). In 1340, Peter ordered the crypts for royalty and nobility to be created, which became an important center for burial. The abbots of Poblet became a very powerful part of the clergy who participated in Parliament; one abbot even became president of the Generalitat. The involvement of the abbots in Catalan wars became apparent.

=== Monastery of La Rabida ===
This is a Franciscan monastery in the town of Palos de la Frontera, in Huelva province. This was an important place in the history of Spain since its participation in the negotiations which took place between the friars and Fray Antonio de Marchena Friar Juan Perez and Colon during the four visits he made. The monks helped and supported Columbus to the Catholic Monarchs, and as such the monastery is part of what is termed "Columbus's Places" in Andalusia.

=== Monastery of San Millán de la Cogolla ===
In this small and humble monastery were first written the annotations or glosses called Emilian Glosses written in "romance", a little- studied form of Castilian derived from Latin, and two or three in Euskera. It is considered the cradle of these languages.

=== Monastery of Guadalupe ===
It had a famous scriptorium which produced a series of illuminated books, many of which are preserved in the museum of the monastery. The medieval image of the Virgin of Guadalupe which was taken by the discoverers of Extremadura to the Americas. This images is particularly venerated in Mexico.

Many well known historical figures passed through the monastery as pilgrims: Christopher Columbus, Hernán Cortés, King Sebastian of Portugal, Teresa de Jesus Buenfil, Lope de Vega and Pope John Paul II (in 1982.)

=== Monastery of Santo Toribio de Liebana ===
Founded in the sixth century in the Cantabrian region of Liébana, this monastery held from the eighth century a relic of the True Cross, supposedly the largest fragment preserved. At the same time, the monk Beatus of Liébana wrote two works of great significance: the Commentary on Revelation, of which several valuable illuminated illustrated copies are held, and the refutation of heresy that had spread among Mozarabic Christians under Muslim occupation and Elipando, bishop of Toledo. The monastery regularly celebrated a Jubilee or Holy Year Liebana.

=== Monastery of San Salvador de Tabara ===
This was a two-part monastery of monks and nuns in the Visigothic tradition, founded by Abbot Froila, under the patronage of Alfonso III and located 43 km northeast of Zamora. The excavations brought to light two columnar towers and an arch that led to the lower room of the tower. In this tower was the scriptorium where the monk Emeterio finished illuminating the Beatus miniatures Tabara, initiated by his master, Magio. Emeterio himself writes the following account:

"Oh Tábara tower, high tower of stone! It's there in the top and into the first room of the library, where sat Emeterio and hunched over his homework, over 3 months, and all the members crippled by the work of the pen. 52 was finished this book 6 of the Kalends of August, the year 1008 was Hispanic, 53 to the facet hour."

This phrase, along with an illustration of the tower workplace, have been highly valued for depicting how such work was in the monasteries.

=== Monastery of El Palancar ===
Founded by San Pedro de Alcantara Acim Pedroso (Cáceres (province)) in 1557, this was considered the world's smallest religious house. Subsequently extended, it retained the original area under the name of the convent. In a tiny space, were built several structures a chapel for the offices large enough to fit only the officiant and an acolyte, to which is attached the founder's cell, which describes Santa Teresa de Jesús this way: It seems they were forty years, he told me he had slept one hour and a half between night and day, and it was the greatest work of penance that had in the early to beat the dream and it was always or kneeling or standing. I was sitting and sleeping head leaning against a maderillo he had driven into the wall. Lying, even if I wanted, I could not because his cell as we know, was not longer than four feet and a half.

=== Monastery of El Escorial ===
Designed to be not only a monastery but a royal residence and as a pantheon of kings of the houses of Austria and Bourbon. Herrera architecture was revolutionary in Spanish art, and El Escorial retains artifacts, and its library and art gallery spaces are considered to hold rich and valuable collections.

=== Monastery of the Valley of the Fallen ===
Located in the Sierra de Guadarrama mountain range near Madrid, this led in the years after its building to a great social impact, not only by the vast proportion its construction but its later role in burials.

== Spanish monasteries in the 21st century ==
Many monasteries have crumbled over the centuries, leaving no trace of their existence. However, some may be described by researchers who have access to related documents. In some cases, these documents only speak of history, but in other cases, contracts or purchases remain fairly accurately related to the buildings. A large number of the monasteries have only the church as a witness of the complex that might be. At other times, ruins remain which are being transformed to a fruitful use. Occasionally buildings which remained intact over the centuries have been converted into a hotel, a school or a restaurant. In none of these cases, has the modern business retained the property the garden or nearby buildings.

Also many of these medieval monasteries have regained their original function and survive as a community of monks or nuns. In the absence of patronage and custom or donations, these religious people adapt to modern life with modern media and subsist on the work undertaken by the community's members: confectionery, wine and spirits, cheese, bee hives, poultry farms, textiles and fiber arts, writing scores, dissertations, obituaries, advanced computing, pottery of all kinds, decorated white porcelain, artisanal food, farming, vestments, textiles, caring for sick and elderly, schools and daycare.

In addition, about 250 monasteries have a guest house for lay people who must follow some basic rules, with minimal cost.
