= Christianity in the 11th century =

Medallion of Christ from Constantinople, c. 1100.

Christianity in the 11th century is marked primarily by the Great Schism of the Church, which formally divided the State church of the Roman Empire into Eastern (Greek) and Western (Latin) branches.

In 1054, following the death of the Patriarch of Rome Leo IX, papal legates (representatives of the Pope) from Rome traveled to Constantinople to deny Michael Cerularius, the reigning Patriarch of Constantinople, the title of Ecumenical Patriarch and to insist that he recognize the Church of Rome's claim to be the head and mother of the churches. Cerularius refused, resulting in the leader of the contingent from Rome excommunicating Cerularius and the legates in turn being excommunicated by Constantinople. Though this event, in and of itself, was relatively insignificant (and the authority of the legates in their actions was dubious) it ultimately marked the end of any pretense of a union between the eastern and western branches of the Church. Though efforts were made at reconciliation at various times, they remained divided, either claiming to be the true Christian Church.

== Investiture Controversy ==
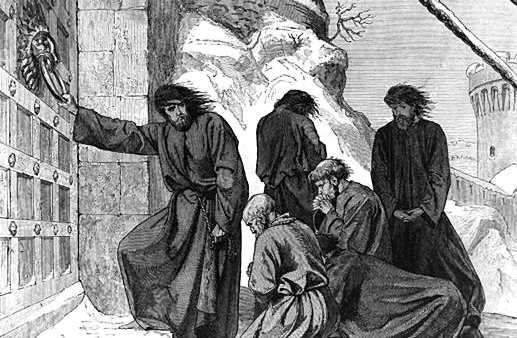
Henry IV at the gate of Canossa, by August von Heyden

The first major phase of the struggle between Church and state in medieval Europe was marked by the Investiture Controversy between emperor and Pope over the right to make church appointments. The Papacy were the initial victors, but as Italians divided between Guelphs and Ghibellines in factions that were often passed down through families or states until the end of the Middle Ages, the dispute gradually weakened the Papacy, not least by drawing it into politics. In 1059 the Church attempted to control, or exact a price for, most marriages among the great by prohibiting marriages involving consanguinity (blood kin) and affinity (kin by marriage) to the seventh degree of relationship. Under these rules, almost all great marriages required a dispensation. The rules were relaxed to the fourth degree in 1215.

The Investiture Controversy, or Lay investiture controversy, was the most significant conflict between secular and religious powers in medieval Europe. It began as a dispute in the 11th century between the Holy Roman Emperor Henry IV, and Pope Gregory VII concerning who would appoint bishops (investiture). The end of lay investiture threatened to undercut the power of the empire and the ambitions of noblemen for the benefit of Church reform.

Bishops collected revenues from estates attached to their bishopric. Noblemen who held lands hereditarily passed those lands on within their family. However, because bishops had no legitimate children, when a bishop died it was the king's right to appoint a successor. So, while a king had little recourse in preventing noblemen from acquiring powerful domains via inheritance and dynastic marriages, a king could keep careful control of lands under the domain of his bishops. Kings would bestow bishoprics to members of noble families whose friendship he wished to secure. Furthermore, if a king left a bishopric vacant, then he collected the estates' revenues until a bishop was appointed, when in theory he was to repay the earnings. The infrequence of this repayment was an obvious source of dispute. The Church wanted to end this lay investiture because of the potential corruption, not only from vacant sees but also from other practices such as simony.

Pope Gregory VII issued the Dictatus Papae, which declared that the Pope alone could appoint or depose bishops or translate them to other sees. Henry IV's rejection of the decree lead to his excommunication and a ducal revolt; eventually Henry received absolution after dramatic public penance barefoot in Alpine snow and cloaked in a hairshirt, though the revolt and conflict of investiture continued. Likewise, a similar controversy occurred in England between King Henry I and St. Anselm, Archbishop of Canterbury, over investiture and ecclesiastical revenues collected by the king during an episcopal vacancy. The English dispute was resolved by the Concordat of London in 1107, where the king renounced his claim to invest bishops but continued to require an oath of fealty from them upon their election. This was a partial model for the Concordat of Worms (Pactum Calixtinum), which resolved the imperial investiture controversy with a compromise that allowed secular authorities some measure of control but granted the selection of bishops to their cathedral canons. As a symbol of the compromise, lay authorities invested bishops with their secular authority symbolised by the lance, and ecclesiastical authorities invested bishops with their spiritual authority symbolised by the ring and the staff.

== Byzantine conquest of Bulgaria ==
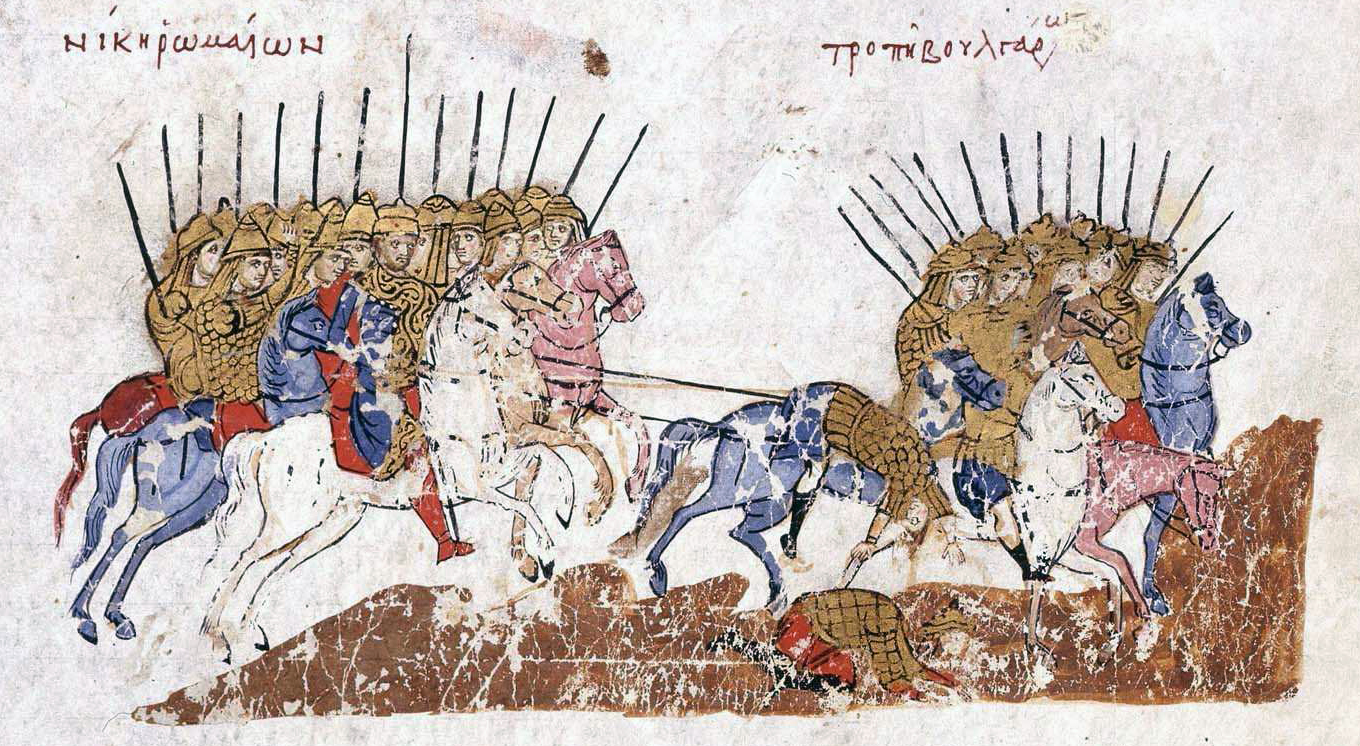
Victorious Byzantine cataphracts pursuing the fleeing Bulgarian heavy cavalry, from the Madrid Skylitzes

Emperor Basil II Porphyrogenitus sought to restore former territories of the Byzantine Empire. By 1000, Basil II had fought off his own nobility and defeated the Islamic threat from the east, and so led another invasion of Bulgaria. Bulgaria had been partly subjugated by John I Tzimiskes after the invasion of Svyatoslav I of Kiev but parts of the country had remained outside Byzantine control under the leadership of Samuel and his brothers.

This time instead of marching into the middle of the country, he annexed it bit by bit. Eventually, after denying Bulgaria of about a third of its land, the Bulgarians risked everything in one battle in 1014. The Battle of Kleidion was a disaster for the Bulgarians and the Byzantine army captured 15,000 prisoners; 99 out of every 100 was blinded and the 100th was spared one eye to guide the rest back to their homes. The Bulgarians resisted until 1018 when they finally submitted to Basil II's rule.

Following his final subjugation of the Bulgarian state in 1018, Basil II, to underscore the Byzantine victory, established the Archbishopric of Ohrid by downgrading the Bulgarian patriarchate to the rank of the archbishopric. The now archbishopric remained an autocephalous church, separate from the Patriarchate of Constantinople. However, while the archbishopric was completely independent in any other aspect, its primate was selected by the emperor from a list of three candidates submitted by the local church synod. In three sigillia issued in 1020 Basil II gave extensive privileges to the new see.

Although the first appointed archbishop (John of Debar) was a Bulgarian, his successors, as well as the whole higher clergy, were selected from Byzantines. The monks and the ordinary priests continued to be predominantly Bulgarian. To a large extent the archbishopric preserved its national character, upheld the Slavonic liturgy, and continued its contribution to the development of Bulgarian literature.

== Theology ==
=== Western theology before Scholasticism ===
With the division and decline of the Carolingian Empire, notable theological activity was preserved in some of the Cathedral schools that had begun to rise to prominence under it – for instance at Auxerre in the 9th century or Chartres in the 11th. Intellectual influences from the Arabic world (including works of classical authors preserved by Islamic scholars) percolated into the Christian West via Spain, influencing such theologians as Gerbert of Aurillac, who went on to become Pope Sylvester II and mentor to Otto III. (Otto was the fourth ruler of the Germanic Ottonian Holy Roman Empire, successor to the Carolingian Empire). With hindsight, one might say that a new note was struck when a controversy about the meaning of the eucharist blew up around Berengar of Tours in the 11th century: hints of a new confidence in the intellectual investigation of the faith that perhaps foreshadowed the explosion of theological argument that was to take place in the 12th century.

Notable authors include:

- Fulbert of Chartres (died 1028)
- Berengar of Tours (c.999-1088)
- Lanfranc (died 1089)

== Monasticism ==
One of the major developments in monasticism during the 11th century was the height of the Cluniac reforms, which centred upon Cluny Abbey in Burgundy, which controlled a large centralised order with over two hundred monasteries throughout Western Christendom. Cluny championed a revived Papacy during this century and encouraged stricter monastic discipline with a return to the principles of the Benedictine Rule. Cluny Abbey promoted art and literature, and the liturgy at the Romanesque abbey church was an ornate formal affair dedicated to glorifying God. Together with the revived Papacy, Cluny worked for greater devotion among men in the Church. Towards the end of the 12th century, the wealth and power of Cluny was criticised by many monastics in the Church, especially those that broke from the Cluniac order to form the Cistercians, who devoted themselves with much greater rigor to manual labour and severe austerity.

== Spread of Christianity ==
=== Poland ===
The spread of Christianity was reversed temporarily in Poland, as the pagan reaction in Poland saw many churches and monasteries burned, and priests killed.

=== Scandinavia ===
Scandinavia was the last part of Germanic Europe to convert and most resistant. From the High Middle Ages, the territories of Northern Europe were gradually converted to Christianity under German leadership. German and Scandinavian noblemen extended their power to Finnic, Samic, Baltic and some Slavic peoples. Migrations of peoples, although not strictly part of the 'Migration Age', continued beyond 1000, marked by Viking, Magyar, Turkic and Mongol invasions, also had significant effects, especially in eastern Europe.

=== Goths ===
Many Goths converted to Christianity as individuals outside the Roman Empire. Most members of other tribes converted Christian when their respective tribes settled within the empire, and most Franks and Anglo-Saxons converted a few generations later. During the later centuries following the Fall of Rome, as the Roman Church gradually split between the dioceses loyal to the Patriarch of Rome in the West and those loyal to the other Patriarchs in the East, most of the Germanic peoples (excepting the Crimean Goths and a few other eastern groups) gradually became strongly allied with the Western Church, particularly as a result of the reign of Charlemagne.

=== Georgia ===
In 1010, the church in the unified Kingdom of Georgia became autocephalous (self-governing), and its catholicos (Melchizedek I) was elevated to the rank of patriarch and obtained the official title of Catholicos-Patriarch of All Georgia.

== East-West Schism ==
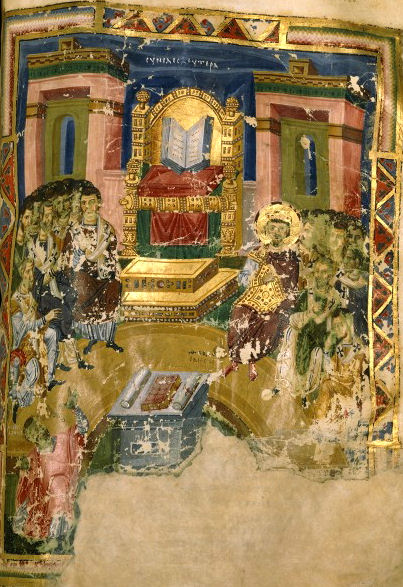
The Second Ecumenical Council whose additions to the original Nicene Creed lay at the heart of one of the theological disputes associated with the East-West Schism. (Illustration, 879-882 AD, from manuscript, Homilies of Gregory Nazianzus, Bibliothèque nationale de France)

The East-West Schism, or Great Schism, separated the Church into Western (Latin) and Eastern (Greek) branches, i.e., Western Catholicism and Eastern Orthodoxy. It was the first major division since certain groups in the East rejected the decrees of the Council of Chalcedon (see Oriental Orthodoxy) and was far more significant. Relations between East and West had long been embittered by political and ecclesiastical differences and theological disputes.

There were doctrinal issues like the filioque clause and the authority of the Pope involved in the split, but these were exacerbated by cultural and linguistic differences between Latins and Greeks. Prior to that, the Eastern and Western halves of the Church had frequently been in conflict, particularly during the periods of iconoclasm and the Photian schism. The Orthodox East perceived the Papacy as taking on monarch type characteristics that were not in line with the church's historical tradition.

The "official" schism in 1054 was the excommunication of Patriarch Michael Cerularius of Constantinople, followed by his excommunication of papal legates. Both groups are descended from the Early Church, both acknowledge the apostolic succession of each other's bishops and the validity of each other's sacraments. Though both acknowledge the primacy of the Bishop of Rome, Eastern Orthodoxy understands this as a primacy of honour with limited or no ecclesiastical authority in other dioceses. The Orthodox East perceived the Papacy as taking on monarch type characteristics that were not in line with the church's tradition.

=== Ecclesiology ===
At the root of what became the Great Schism is the question of ecclesiology. The Eastern Churches maintained the idea that every local city-church with its bishop, presbyters, deacons and people celebrating the Eucharist constituted the whole Church. In this view called Eucharistic ecclesiology (or more recently holographic ecclesiology), every bishop is Saint Peter's successor in his church ("the Church") and the churches form what Eusebius called a common union of churches. This implied that all bishops were ontologically equal, although functionally particular bishops could be granted special privileges by other bishops and serve as metropolitans, archbishops or patriarchs. Early on, the ecclesiology of the Roman Church was universal in nature, with the idea that the Church was a worldwide organism with a divinely (not functionally) appointed center: the Church/Bishop of Rome.

=== Language and culture ===
The dominant language of the West was Latin, whilst that of the East was Greek. Soon after the fall of the Western Empire, the number of individuals who spoke both Latin and Greek began to dwindle, and communication between East and West grew much more difficult. With linguistic unity gone, cultural unity began to crumble as well. The two halves of the Church were naturally divided along similar lines; they developed different rites and had different approaches to religious doctrines.

=== Papal Supremacy ===
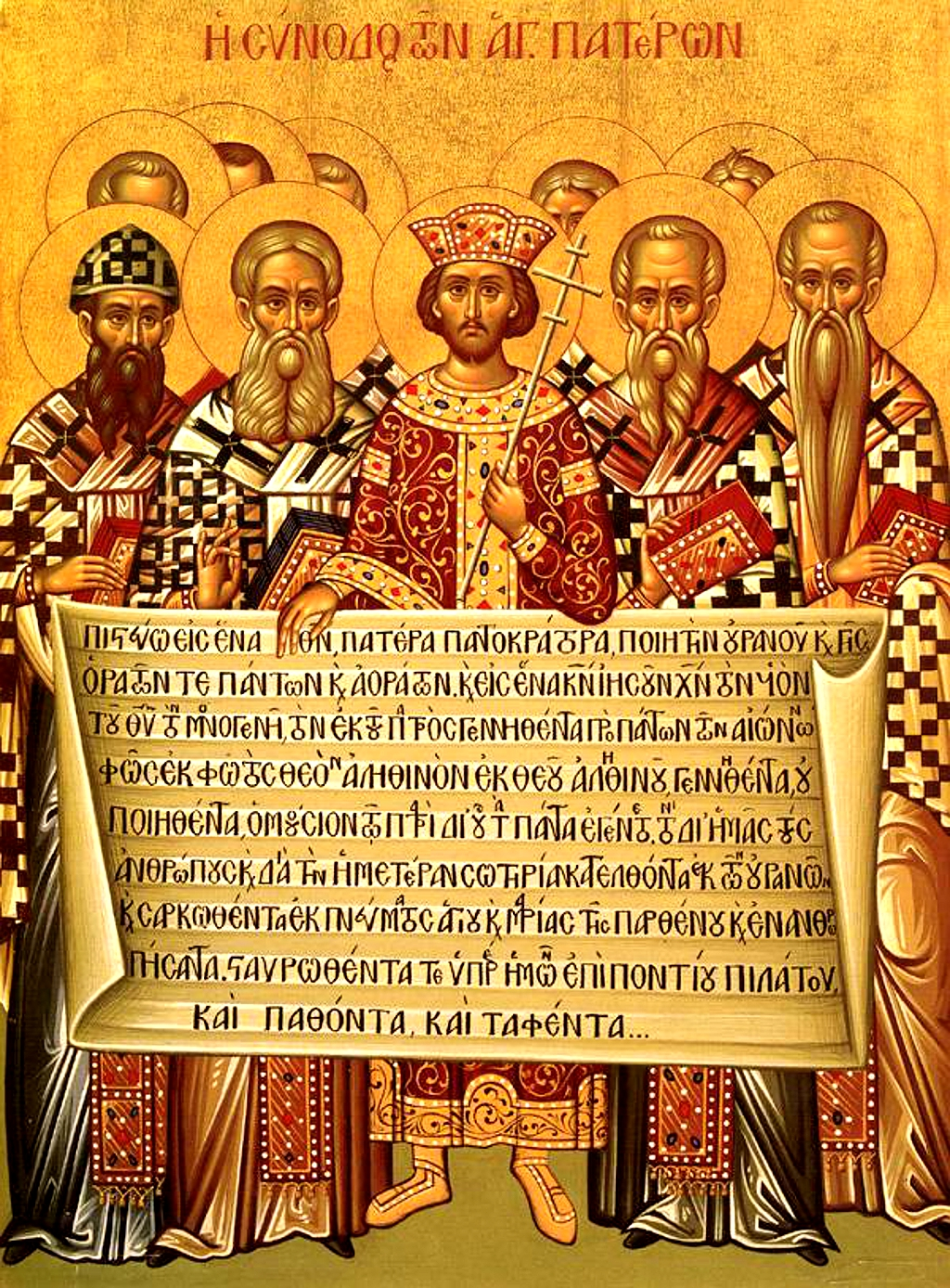
Icon depicting the Emperor Constantine (centre) and the bishops of the First Council of Nicaea (325) holding the Niceno–Constantinopolitan Creed of 381.

The primary causes of the Schism were disputes over conflicting claims of jurisdiction, in particular over papal authority—Pope Leo IX claimed he held authority over the four Eastern patriarchs and over the insertion of the Filioque clause into the Nicene Creed by the Western patriarch in 1014. Eastern Orthodoxy states that the 28th Canon of the Council of Chalcedon explicitly proclaimed the equality of the Bishops of Rome and Constantinople.

The seventh canon of the Council of Ephesus declared:

It is unlawful for any man to bring forward, or to write, or to compose a different (ἑτέραν) Faith as a rival to that established by the holy Fathers assembled with the Holy Ghost in Nicæa. But those who shall dare to compose a different faith, or to introduce or offer it to persons desiring to turn to the acknowledgment of the truth, whether from Heathenism or from Judaism, or from any heresy whatsoever, shall be deposed, if they be bishops or clergymen; bishops from the episcopate and clergymen from the clergy; and if they be laymen, they shall be anathematized

Eastern Orthodoxy also observes that this canon of the Council of Ephesus in 431 explicitly prohibited modification of the Nicene Creed drawn up by the First Council of Nicaea in 325 and modified by the second Ecumenical Council in 381. Thus to change "who proceeds from the Father" to "who proceeds from the Father and the Son" (Latin "filioque" added) is rejected by the Orthodox both as illicit and doctrinally incorrect.

In the Orthodox view, the Bishop of Rome (i.e. the Pope) would have universal primacy in a reunited Christendom, as primus inter pares without power of jurisdiction.

=== Other points of conflict ===
Many other issues increased tensions.

- The Western Church's insertion of "Filioque" into the Latin version of the Nicene Creed.
- Disputes in the Balkans, Southern Italy, and Sicily over whether Rome or Constantinople had ecclesiastical jurisdiction.
- As a result of the Muslim conquests of the territories of the patriarchates of Alexandria, Antioch and Jerusalem, only two rival powerful centres of ecclesiastical authority, Constantinople and Rome, remained.
- Certain liturgical practices in the West that the East believed represented illegitimate innovation: the use of unleavened bread for the Eucharist, for example (see Azymite).
- Celibacy among Western priests (both monastic and parish), as opposed to the Eastern discipline whereby parish priests could be married men.

=== Mutual excommunication of 1054 ===
The dispute about the authority of Roman bishops reached a climax in 1054, when Michael I Cerularius tried to bolster his position as the "Patriarch of Constantinople", seeming to set himself up as a rival of Pope Leo IX, as the Popes previously had forbidden calling Constantinople a patriarchate. The dispute ended when the Pope's legate, Cardinal Humbert, excommunicated Cerularius and, in exchange, Michael excommunicated the papal legates. It was suspected by the Patriarch that the bull of excommunication, placed on the altar of Hagia Sophia, had been tampered with by Argyros, the commander of Southern Italy, who had a drawn-out controversy with Michael I Cerularius. Although this is commonly viewed as the "Great Schism", historically the event did little to change the relationship between East and West at that time. Michael himself knew that the Pope was a prisoner of the Normans at the time that Humbert arrived, and by the time Michael was excommunicated Pope Leo had already died, voiding the papal legates of authority. Moreover, Michael did not excommunicate the Pope, nor even the Western Church, but only the papal delegation.

Most of the direct causes of the Great Schism, however, are far less grandiose than the famous Filioque. The relations between the Papacy and the Byzantine court were good in the years leading up to 1054. The emperor Constantine IX and the Pope Leo IX were allied through the mediation of the Lombard catepan of Italy, Argyrus, who had spent years in Constantinople, originally as a political prisoner.

Cerularius ordered a letter to be written to the bishop of Trani in which he attacked the "Judaistic" practices of the West, namely the use of unleavened bread. The letter was to be sent by John to all the bishops of the West, including the Pope. John promptly complied, and the letter was passed to Humbert of Mourmoutiers, the cardinal-bishop of Silva Candida, who translated the letter into Latin and brought it to the Pope, who ordered a reply to be made to each charge and a defence of papal supremacy to be laid out in a response.

Michael was convinced to cool the debate and thus attempt to prevent the impending breach. However, Humbert and the Pope made no concessions and the former was sent with legatine powers to the imperial capital to solve the questions raised once and for all. Humbert, Frederick of Lorraine, and Peter, Archbishop of Amalfi arrived in April 1054 and were met with a hostile reception; they stormed out of the palace, leaving the papal response with Michael, who in turn was even more angered by their actions. The patriarch refused to recognise their authority or, practically, their existence. When Pope Leo died on April 19, 1054, the legates' authority legally ceased, but they effectively ignored this technicality.

In response to Michael's refusal to address the issues at hand, the legatine mission took the extreme measure of entering the church of the Hagia Sophia during the divine liturgy and placing a Bull of Excommunication (1054) on the altar.

The legates left for Rome two days after issuing the Bull of Excommunication, leaving behind a city near riot. The patriarch had the immense support of the people against the emperor, who had supported the legates to his own detriment. To assuage popular anger, the bull was burnt, and the legates were anathematised. Only the legates were anathematised and, once again, there was no explicit indication that the entire Western church was being anathematised.

In the bull of excommunication issued against Patriarch Michael by the papal legates, one of the reasons cited was the Eastern Church's deletion of the "Filioque" from the original Nicene Creed. In fact, it was the opposite: the Eastern Church did not delete anything. It was the Western Church that added this phrase to the Nicene-Constantinopolitan Creed.

== Nobility ==
Violence was endemic amongst the nobility of the Middle Ages with the Church seeking to prevent ecclesiastical land and the clergy becoming involved. Clerics and peasants were granted immunity from violence by the Peace of God (Pax Dei), fighting was banned on holy days by the Truce of God (Treuga Dei) and the concept of chivalry developed. The wealthy lords and nobles would give the monasteries estates in exchange for the conduction of masses for the soul of a deceased loved one. Though this was likely not the original intent of Benedict, the efficiency of his cenobitic Rule in addition to the stability of the monasteries made such estates very productive; the general monk was then raised to a level of nobility, for the serfs of the estate would tend to the labor, while the monk was free to study. The monasteries thus attracted many of the best people in society, and during this period the monasteries were the central storehouses and producers of knowledge.

== Crusades ==
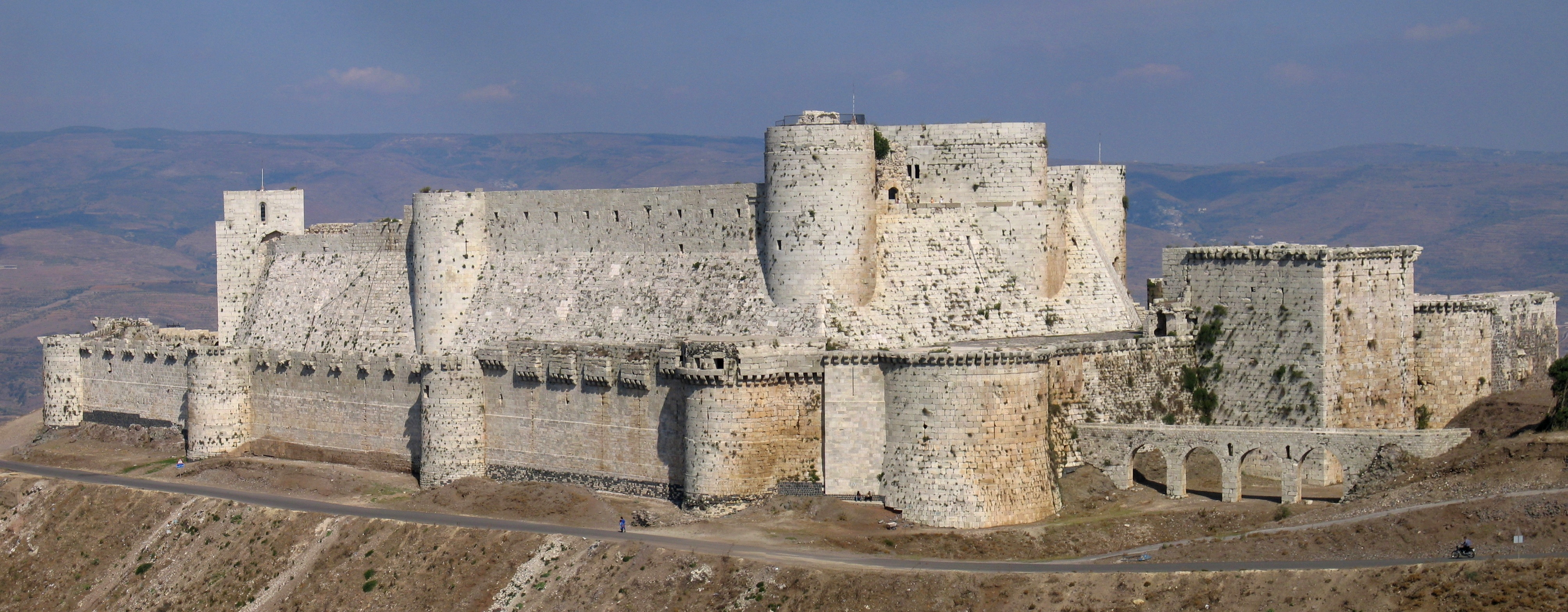
Krak des Chevaliers was built in the County of Tripoli by the Knights Hospitaller during the Crusades.

=== Background ===
Until the Islamic conquests of the 7th and 8th centuries the Holy Land was part of the Roman and then Byzantine Empire. In 1009, when the Fatimid Caliph al-Hakim bi-Amr Allah destroyed the Church of the Holy Sepulchre, but in 1039 his successor was paid a large sum by the Byzantine Empire to rebuild it. Western Christians were allowed to visit the sacred places in the Holy Land. In 1063, Pope Alexander II had given his blessing to Iberian Christians in their wars against the Muslims, granting both a papal standard, the vexillum sancti Petri, and an indulgence to those killed in battle. Both sides of the Investiture Controversy tried to marshal public opinion in their favour creating personal engagement, awakening of intense Christian piety and public interest in religious affairs. This was strengthened by religious propaganda advocating Just War in order to recover control of the holy places in Jerusalem where the death, resurrection and ascension into heaven of Jesus took place. The Reconquista was not the only European/Muslim conflict. The Norman adventurer Robert Guiscard conquered Calabria in 1057 and held traditionally Byzantine territory from the Muslims of Sicily. The maritime states of Pisa, Genoa and Catalonia were all actively fighting Islamic strongholds in Majorca reducing raiding on the coasts of Italy and Catalonia. This long history of losing territories to a religious enemy created a powerful motive to respond to Byzantine Emperor Alexius I's call for holy war to defend Christendom and to recapture the lost lands starting with Jerusalem. The Papacy of Pope Gregory VII struggled with the doctrinal validity of holy war. Saint Augustine of Hippo had justified the use of force in the service of Christ in The City of God, and a Christian just war although this might enhance the Papacy's standing in Europe, stem violence amongst the western nobility as the "Peace of God" movement had failed and provide leverage the claims of supremacy over the Patriarch of Constantinople, which had resulted in the Great Schism of 1054. However, Gregory's conflict with the German emperor over the Investiture Controversy meant no crusade materialised. For Gregory's successor, Pope Urban II, a crusade would serve to reunite Christendom, bolster the Papacy, and perhaps bring the East under his control.

=== Council of Clermont ===
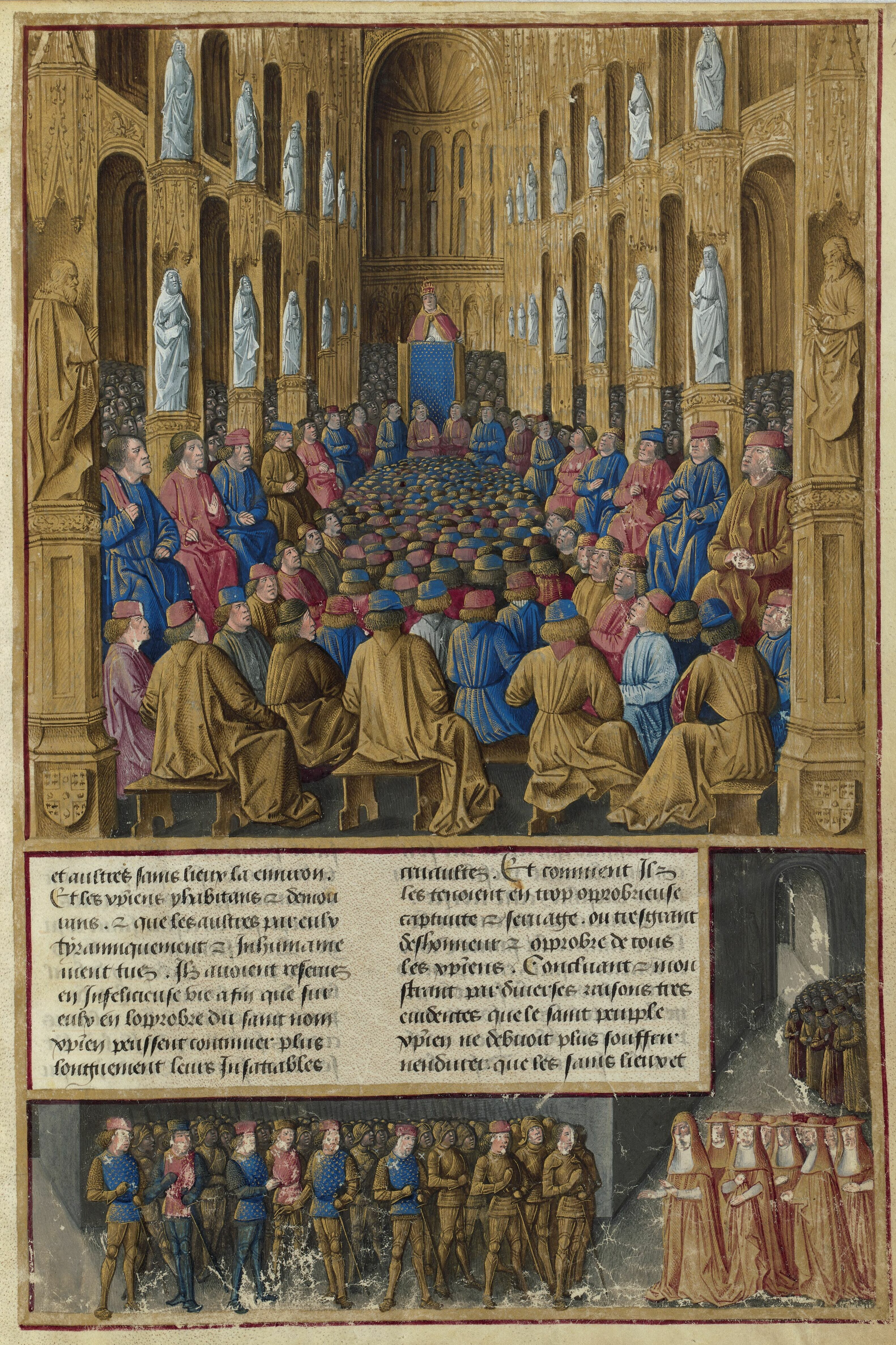
15th-century painting of Pope Urban II at the Council of Clermont (1095), where he preached an impassioned sermon to take back the Holy Land; later manuscript illumination of c. 1490

In March 1095 at the Council of Piacenza, ambassadors sent by Byzantine Emperor Alexius I called for help with defending his empire against the Seljuk Turks. Urban II called for support from the Western nobility at the Council of Clermont on 27 November 1095, combining the idea of pilgrimage to the Holy Land with that of waging a holy war against infidels. Later that year, at Clermont, Pope Urban II called upon all Christians to join a war against the Turks, promising those who died in the endeavor would receive immediate remission of their sins.

=== First Crusade, 1095–1099 ===
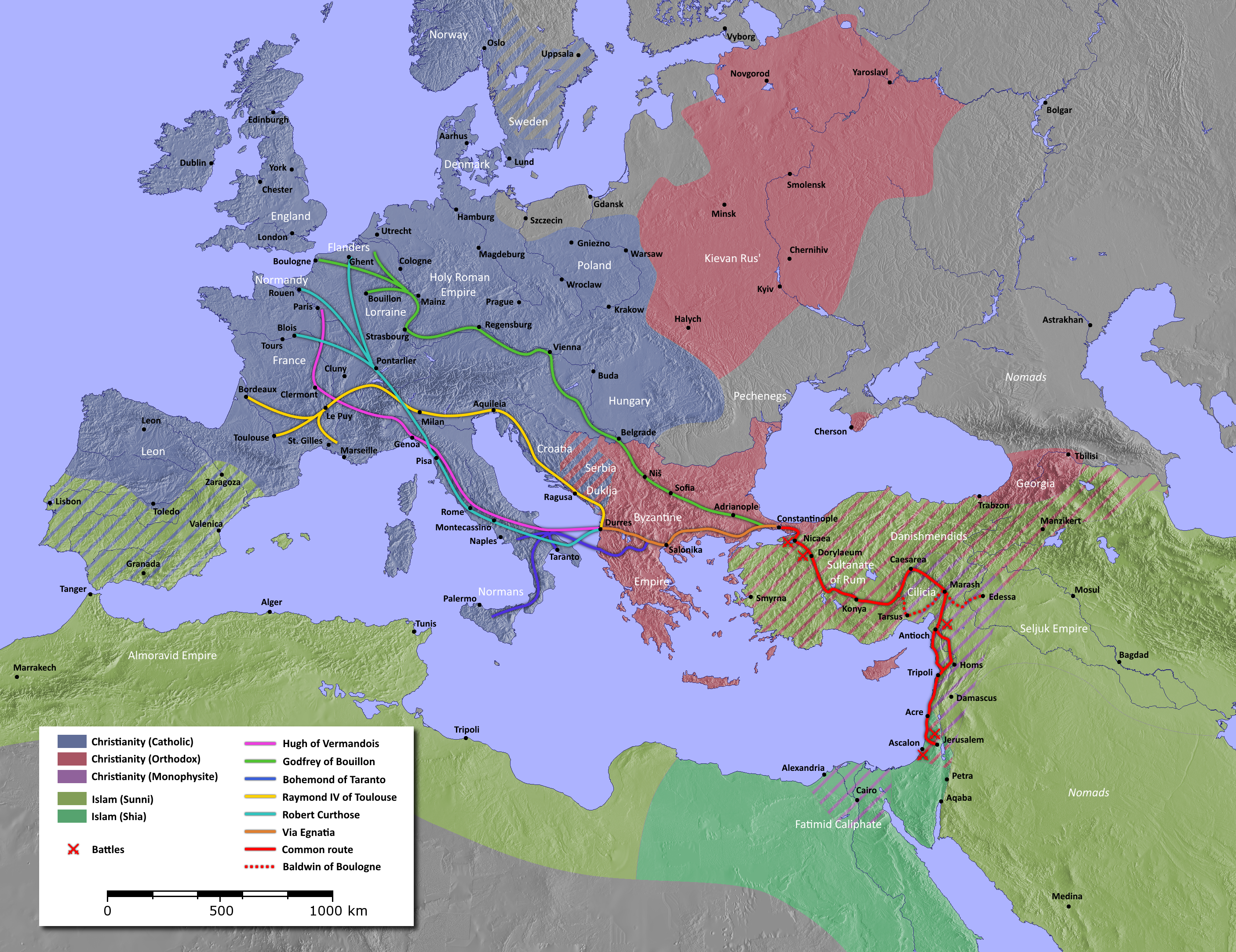
A map of the routes of the major leaders of the crusade, in French

The Siege of Antioch took place shortly before the siege on Jerusalem during the first Crusade. Antioch fell to the Franks in May 1098 but not before a lengthy siege. The ruler of Antioch was not sure how the Christians living within his city would react, and he forced them to live outside the city during the siege, though he promised to protect their wives and children from harm, while Jews and Muslims fought together. The siege only came to end when the city was betrayed and the Franks entered through the water-gate of the town causing the leader to flee. Once inside the city, as was standard military practice at the time, the Franks then massacred the civilians, destroyed mosques and pillaged the city. The crusaders finally marched to the walls of Jerusalem with only a fraction of their original forces. The Jews and Muslims fought together to defend Jerusalem against the invading Franks. They were unsuccessful though and on 15 July 1099 the crusaders entered the city. Again, they proceeded to massacre the remaining Jewish and Muslim civilians and pillaged or destroyed mosques and the city. One historian has written that the "isolation, alienation and fear" felt by the Franks so far from home helps to explain the atrocities they committed, including the cannibalism which was recorded after the Siege of Maarat in 1098.

The Crusaders also tried to gain control of the city of Tyre but were defeated by the Muslims. The people of Tyre asked Zahir al-Din Atabek, the leader of Damascus, for help defending their city from the Franks with the promise to surrender Tyre to him. When the Franks were defeated the people of Tyre did not surrender the city, but Zahir al-Din simply said "What I have done I have done only for the sake of God and the Muslims, nor out of desire for wealth and kingdom."

=== Aftermath ===
After gaining control of Jerusalem the Crusaders created four Crusader states: the Kingdom of Jerusalem, the County of Edessa, the Principality of Antioch and the County of Tripoli. Initially, Muslims did very little about the Crusader states due to internal conflicts. In the Kingdom of Jerusalem at most 120,000 Franks (predominantly French-speaking Western Christians) ruled over 350,000 Muslims, Jews, and native Eastern Christians.

== Timeline ==
11th century Timeline

- 1001 Byzantine emperor Basil II and Fatimid Caliph Al-Hakim bi-Amr Allah execute a treaty guaranteeing the protection of Christian pilgrimage routes in the Middle East
- 1003 - The Hungarian king sends evangelists to Transylvania
- 1004-1014 Caliph Al-Hakim bi-Amr Allah turned violently against his Christian mother and uncles (two of whom were Patriarchs). He persecuted Christians and had over thirty thousand Christian churches destroyed in the Middle East
- 1008 - Sigfrid (or Sigurd), English missionary, baptizes King Olof of Sweden
- 1009 - Bruno of Querfurt is beheaded in Prussia where he had gone as a missionary
- 1009 Caliph Al-Hakim bi-Amr Allah destroys the Church of the Holy Sepulchre, built over the tomb of Jesus in Jerusalem
- 1012 Antipope Gregory VI, removed by Henry II, Holy Roman Emperor
- 1015 - Russia is said to have been "comprehensively" converted to the Orthodox faith; Olaf II Haroldsson becomes the first king of the whole of Norway. Over the next 15 years he would organize Norway's final conversion and its integration into Christian Europe.
- 1030 Battle of Stiklestad, considered victory of Christianity over Norwegian Paganism
- 1045 Sigfrid of Sweden, Benedictine evangelist
- 1046 Council of Sutri, Pope Sylvester III exiled, Pope Gregory VI admitted to buying the Papacy and resigned, Pope Benedict IX resigned, council appointed Pope Clement II
- 1054 East-West Schism split between Eastern (Orthodox Christianity) and Western (Roman Catholic) churches formalized
- 1058–1059 Antipope Benedict X, defeated in war with Pope Nicholas II and Normans
- 1061–1064 Antipope Honorius II rival of Pope Alexander II
- 1065 Westminster Abbey consecrated
- 1073–1085 Pope Gregory VII, Investiture Controversy with Henry IV, Holy Roman Emperor, proponent of Clerical celibacy, opponent of simony, concubinage, Antipope Clement III
- 1079 Stanislaus of Szczepanów, patron saint of Poland
- 1080 Hospital of Saint John the Baptist founded in Jerusalem by merchants from Amalfi and Salerno - serves as the foundation for the Knights Hospitaller
- 1082 Engelberg Abbey of Switzerland
- 1093–1109 Anselm, Archbishop of Canterbury, wrote Cur Deus Homo (Why God Became Man), a landmark exploration of the Atonement
- 1095-1291 Crusades, first called by Pope Urban II at Council of Clermont against the Muslims to reconquer the Holy Land for Christendom
- 1098 Foundation of the reforming monastery of Cîteaux, leads to the growth of the Cistercian order.

== See also ==
- History of Christianity
- History of the Roman Catholic Church
- History of the Eastern Orthodox Church
- History of Christian theology
- History of Oriental Orthodoxy
- Christianization
- Reconquista
- German Pilgrimage of 1064-1065
- Timeline of Christianity
- Timeline of Christian missions
- Timeline of the Roman Catholic Church
- Chronological list of saints and blesseds in the 11th century

History of Christianity: The Middle Ages
Preceded by: Christianity in the 10th century / 11th century / Followed by: Christianity in the 12th century
BC	C1	C2	C3	C4	C5	C6	C7	C8	C9	C10
C11	C12	C13	C14	C15	C16	C17	C18	C19	C20	C21
