= Winaman =

Winaman (died c.1040) was a nephew and follower of Sigfrid of Sweden (also known as St. Sigfrid of Wexiow). During Sigfrid's mission to convert Scandinavia to Christianity, Winaman and others (Unaman and Sunaman) were attacked and killed by pagan raiders.

He is a Catholic and Orthodox saint, feast day 15 February.
