= Oliver of Ancona =

11th-century Benedictine monk and saint

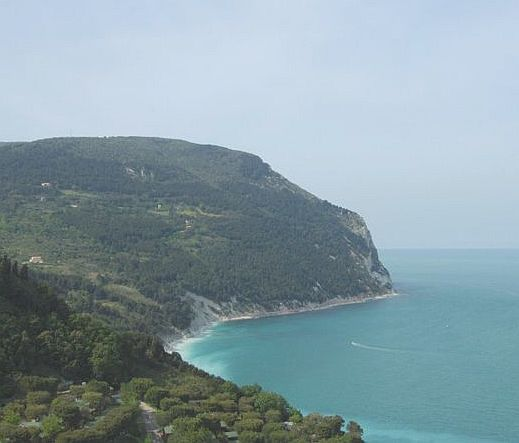
Monte Conero near Ancona

Saint Oliver of Ancona - also known as Oliver of Portonuovo, Oliverius or Liberius (died c. 1050), is a saint of the Catholic and Orthodox Christian churches. His feast day is 3 February.

It is thought that he came from Armenia, or that he originally was a Camaldolese monk from Dalmatia.

He became a Benedictine monk at Santa Maria di Portonuovo, a community at the foot of Monte Conero, south of Ancona on the Italian Adriatic coast. Due to earthquakes and landslides, the monastery was later abandoned.
