= Villavelayo =

- Municipality
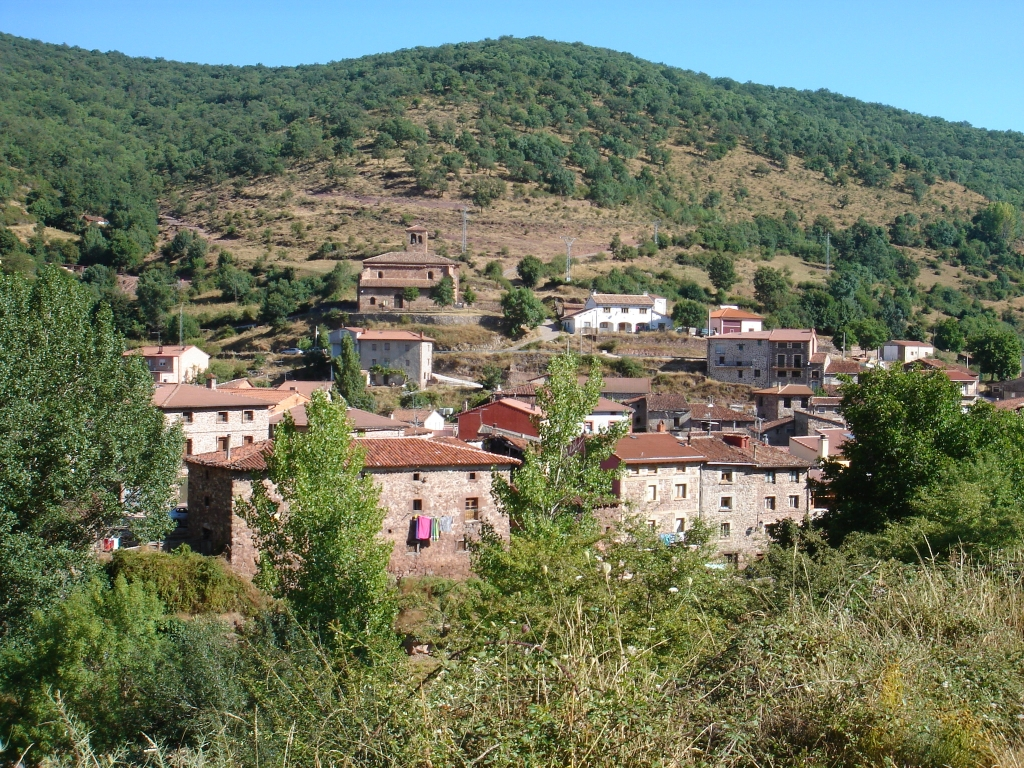

- Location within La Rioja, Spain Location within Spain
- Coordinates: 42°07′50″N 2°59′04″W
- Country: Spain
- Autonomous community: La Rioja
- Comarca: Anguiano

Government
  - Mayor: Alfredo Herrero Medel (PP)

Area
  - Total: 89.07 km^{2} (34.39 sq mi)
- Elevation: 940 m (3,080 ft)

Population (2025-01-01)
  - Total: 43
- Demonym(s): vilayo, ya
- Postal code: 26329
- Website: www.villavelayo.org

Villavelayo is a village in the province and autonomous community of La Rioja, Spain. The municipality covers an area of 89.07 square kilometres (34.39 sq mi) and as of 2011 had a population of 56 people.

== Politics ==
List of mayors since the democratic elections of 1979
Term	Mayor	Political party
1979–1983	S. Medel García	UCD
1983–1987	Andrés Pablo García	AP
1987–1991	Andrés Pablo García	AP
1991–1995	Miguel Ángel Sáinz Domínguez	PSOE
1995–1999	Miguel Ángel Sáinz Domínguez	PSOE
1999–2003	Miguel Ángel Sáinz Domínguez	PSOE
2003–2007	Miguel Ángel Sáinz Domínguez	PSOE
2007–2011	Carlos del Castillo García	PP
2011–2015	Carlos del Castillo García	PP
2015–2019	Alfredo Herrero Medel	PP
2019–2023	n/d	n/d
2023–	n/d	n/d
