= Compludo =

Locality in León, Spain

Coordinates: 42°29′N 6°28′W

Compludo is a locality in the municipality of Ponferrada, in the province of León, Spain. St. Fructuosus of Braga founded a monastery here in the 7th century, but it has not survived. Ulick Ralph Burke wrote that the “country round about Compludo is one of the most interesting in the history of religion in the Peninsula… It is the birthplace of Spanish monarchism –the Thebaïd of the Peninsula- and once rivalled the holiest districts of Palestine in the number of its saints and monasteries.” One of the routes of the Way of St. James passed through here to the Valle del Silencio.
