= Auxbrebis =

Old noble family name

Auxbrebis, originally also written as A Brebis when recognized as échevins (Alderman) and Patrician thereafter as aux Brebis, is an old noble family name. The name has been attested as early as in the thirteenth century. They are illustrated as originating from the city of Dinant as merchants and copper beaters.

== History ==
Auxbrebis is an old noble family, who since the beginning of the fifteenth century, conquered for more than two hundred years as a territorial district ruling family and became a dynasty of ironmasters. They were made members of nobility with the title of viscount. The family was based in Anseremme (Belgium), a submunicipality of Dinant. During that time, Dinant as well as Liège were part of the Southern Netherlands. Dinant was also known to be an important town included in the Prince-Bishopric of Liège. Before gaining ennoblement the Auxbrebis ancestors will have contributed to their uprising status; several family members held key positions within the magistrate or were mayor of Dinant. The family was formerly known to be wealthy and powerful, although the precise role of the Auxbrebis is not well known. The family is presumed to have participated actively in the economic development of the region. Dinant was renowned for its coppersmiths known as the dinanderie industry and according to writer Henri Pirenne's writings they probably covenanted with rich coppersmiths and traders with names from Dinant such as Salmier, Waudrechees and Charpentier being mentioned. Traders were known to have started their activities at several fairs such as at Champagne, Foire du Lendit (Lendit in Paris), Cologne (Germany), in the harbour of Dinant and especially in London (England) to where large quantities were exported.

The growing power of kings and princes in the fifteenth century is characterized by the constitution of the states. After an uprising in Dinant, Charles the Bold also known as le Téméraire attacked the city in August 1466. The city was plundered and destroyed, which caused a negative effect on the local dinanderie industrie, a sad defeat for the Auxbrebis family. Le Téméraire is known to have overnighted at the home of one of the family members on the night before the attack. The attack on Dinant is also known as 'the sac of Dinant'

Subsequently, later generations are known to live in other villages further away returning or involved in trades such as blacksmithing or of charcoal, others through marriage or purchase got into higher ranking positions in the nearby villages, such as Aubrives, Philippeville (Samart), Wartet, Weillen and others. An Auxbrebis branch is later also cited in Antwerp whom eventually moved to the Netherlands, including the capital city of Amsterdam.

Later generations are known to obtain the title of baron or jonkheer.

== The Auxbrebis branch at Aubrives ==
An Auxbrebis descendants branch also left its mark in the commune of Aubrives (France), due to a marriage alliance between Marie Auxbrebis and locally known Jacques Mestallart, receveur (recipient) and Prévôt of the Barony of Hierges in the seventeenth century.

Lamoral d'Auxbrebis was known to be sieur (chief magistrate) in Aubrives.

Jehan d'Aubrebis financed the church (Saint-Maurice) of Aubrives to have it rebuilt in 1642 after it had been destroyed during one of the sieges from the ford of Charlemont (Givet) in 1640. An Auxbrebis coat of arms is still visible inside the church on the ceiling.

The commune's current coat of arms contains two sheep which is a striking similarity to the Auxbrebis coat of arms which has three sheep. The name of the town Aubrives would derive from the Latin name Alba Ripa meaning white shore (rive blanche), although it also has a striking similarity to the name Aubrebis/Auxbrebis. Note that the river Meuse flows through Dinant as well as Aubrives.

== Castles ==
Since the fifteenth century, castle names known to be occupied by the family are Fineval (Finnevaux), Sommière, Chaleux and (Mazechal (ref.req)). These castles are no longer known to be in existence. From the sixteenth century, a castle-farm still partly existent known as Ferme-Château d'Auxbrebis. In 1505 occupation of Château-Ferme de Samart. In the seventeenth century several generations occupied Ferme-Château de Wartet and thereafter a castle gets taken over and extended in Weillen. Dating from the 16th and 17th century a castle was built by the Auxbrebis family known as Château-ferme de Neuville. In the hamlet of Bauche in the commune of Évrehailles which is situated in the municipality of Yvoir a castle named as Le Harnoy was previously named as Le Château d'Aubreby.

== Name variations ==
The name Auxbrebis has been written in various ways throughout the centuries, such as Brebis, A Brebis, A burbis, Al Brebis, aux Brebis, Auxbrebis, Aubrebis, Aubreby, d'Aubreby, d'Auxbrebis.

The most popular given name amongst men in the family is Laurent or Loren which has sometimes caused confusion amongst writers. The Dutch branch writes the name as Laurens.

== Literature ==
- By Jean Germain, Jules Herbillon - Dictionnaire des noms de famille en Wallonie et à Bruxelles - p. 135
- By Jean Germain, Jules Herbillon - Dictionnaire des noms de famille en Wallonie et à Bruxelles - p. 287
- Abbé Auguste SOUPART - Auxbrebis, famille dinantaise et mosane d'Aubrives à Liège, XIIIe-XIXe siècle. Familles notables d'Aubrives au XVIIE siècle, 2002
- Université de Liège. Séminaire de sociologie (1949) p. 27
- LÉON LAHAYE - Le Livre des fiefs de la prévoté de Poilvache
- Decq - ANNUAIRE DE LA NOBLESSE DE BELGIQUE, Volume 22, 1871
- Henri Pirenne - Histoire de la constitution de la ville de Dinant au moyen-âge
- Liège et Bourgogne: actes du Colloque tenu à Liège les 28, 29 et 30 octobre 1968 - p. 176
- Société Royale Sambre et Meuse - Le Guetteur Wallon p.89
- Pierre Mardaga - Le Patrimoine monumental de la Belgique: Wallonie. Province de Namur Arrondissement de Dinant
- Annales de la Société archéologique De Namur - Tome trente-huitieme (1927) - p. 267 (288), p. 277(298)
- Annales de la Société archéologique De Namur - Tome trente-huitieme (1927) - p. 195 (215)
- Jean Le Carpentier - Histoire généalogique des Païs-Bas ou histoire de Cambray et du Cambresis (1664) p. 901
- Archives départementales des Ardennes
- Paul Laurent - Revue historique ardennaise, Volume 2 - pp. 241, 247, 248
- A. Picard et fils - Revue historique ardennaise, Volume 2 - p. 248
- Inventaire sommaire des Archives départementales antérieures à 1790 - p. 283
- Anciens pays et assemblées d'états - p. 50
- conterfeijtsel - (Archive: Gemeentearchief Amsterdam)
- H. C. A. THIEME - De Navorscher (1896) - pp. 59, 60
- Les délices du Païs de Liége et de la Comté de Namur - p. 372
- La Vie wallonne, Issues 44-45 (1970) p. 22
- R. De Vegiano (seigneur d'Hovel), Jacques Salomon, François Joseph, Léon de Herckenrode - Nobiliaire des Pays-Bas et du Comté de Bourgogne p. 75
- Annales de la Société archéologique De Namur - Tome vingt neuvieme (1910) p. 102 (p. 122)
- Charles Bruno - Étude phonetique des patois d'Ardenne (1913) p. 45 (p. 63)
- Revue historique ardennaise, Volume 2 p. 248
- Histoire de Dinant, Volume 2 p. 73

== Private website ==
- The descendance of "a Brebis" of Dinant
