= Orangery =

Covered winter garden

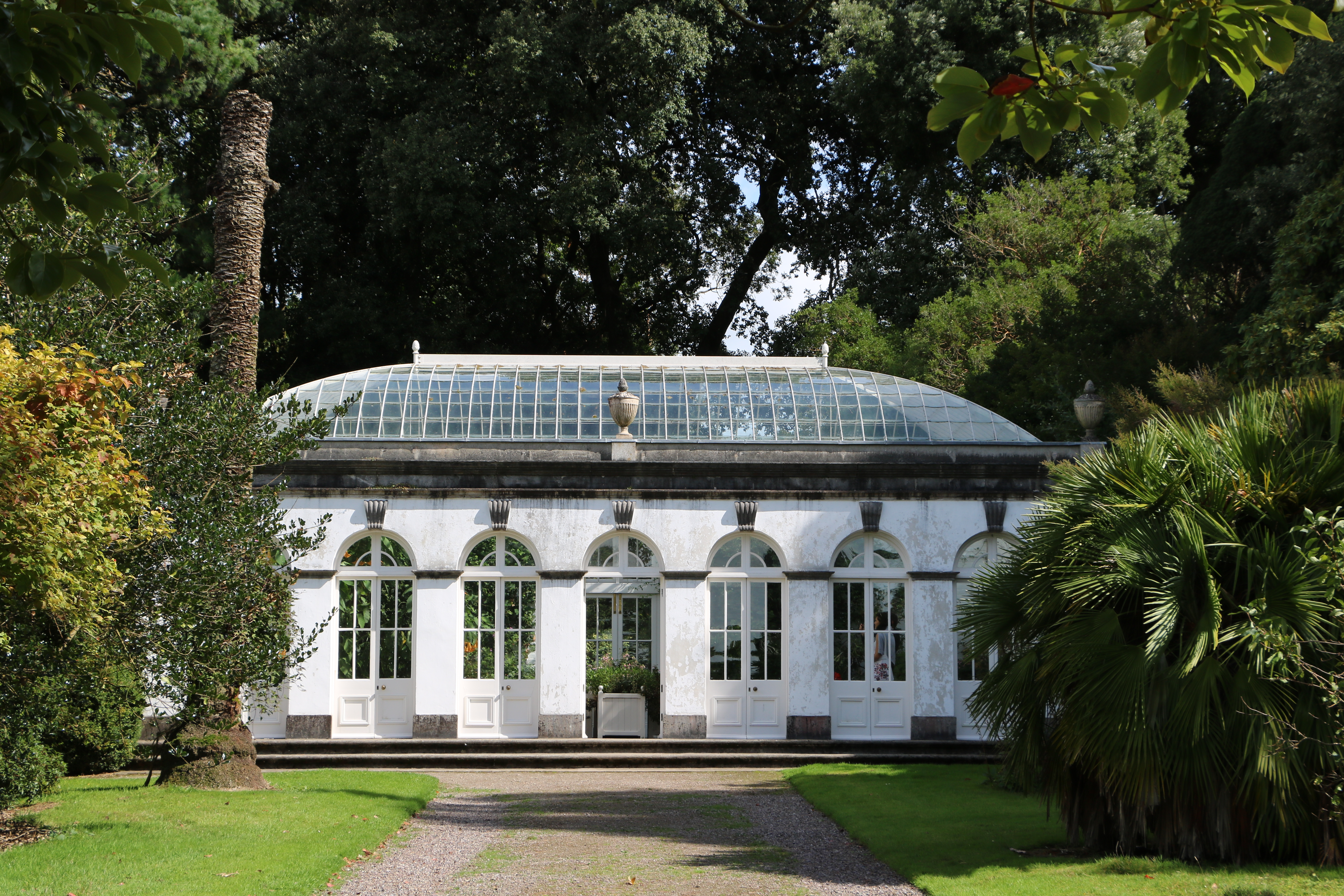
Glazed roof at Fota House orangery, Fota Island, Ireland

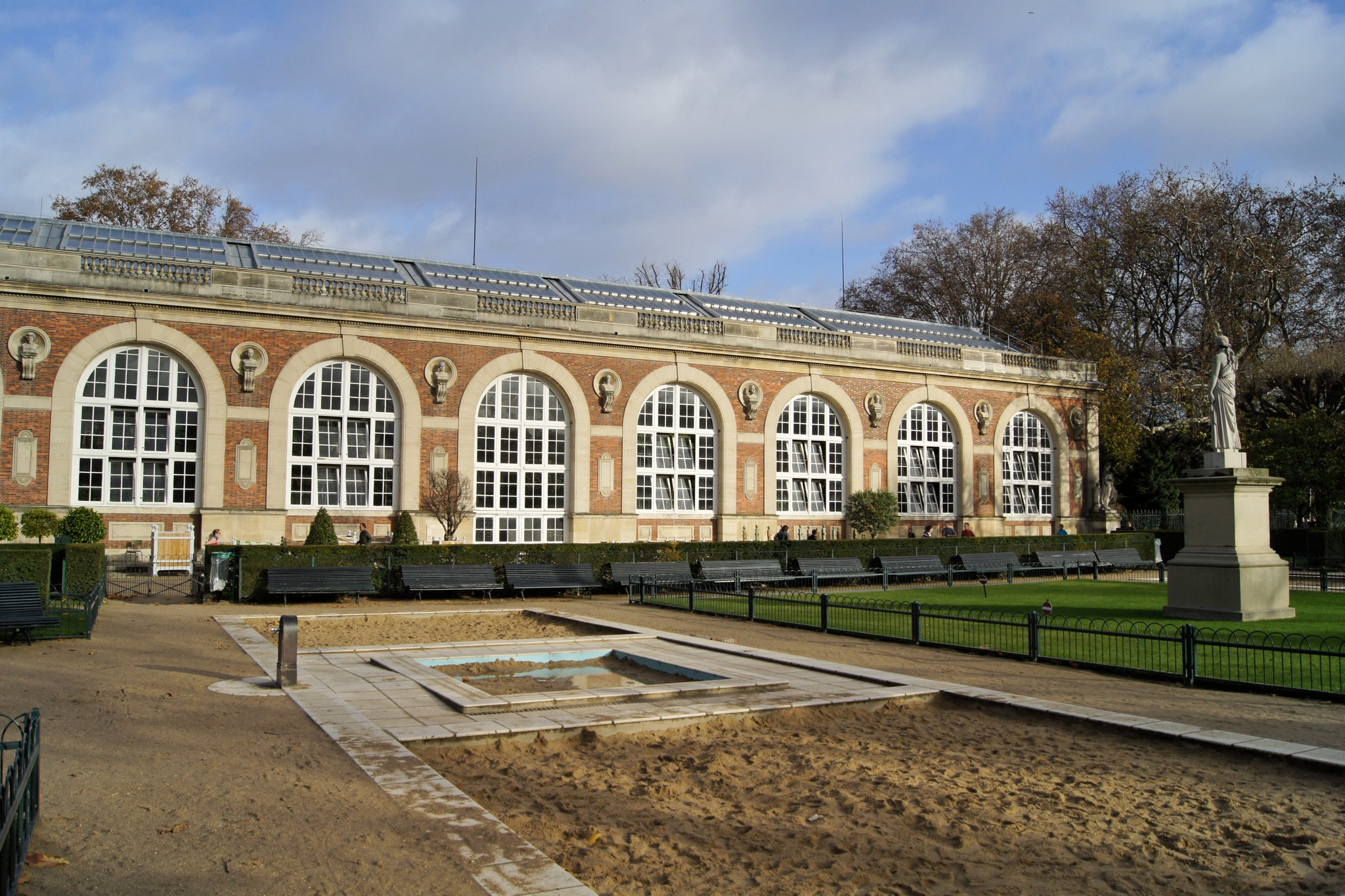
L'orangerie du Senat in the Jardin du Luxembourg in Paris.

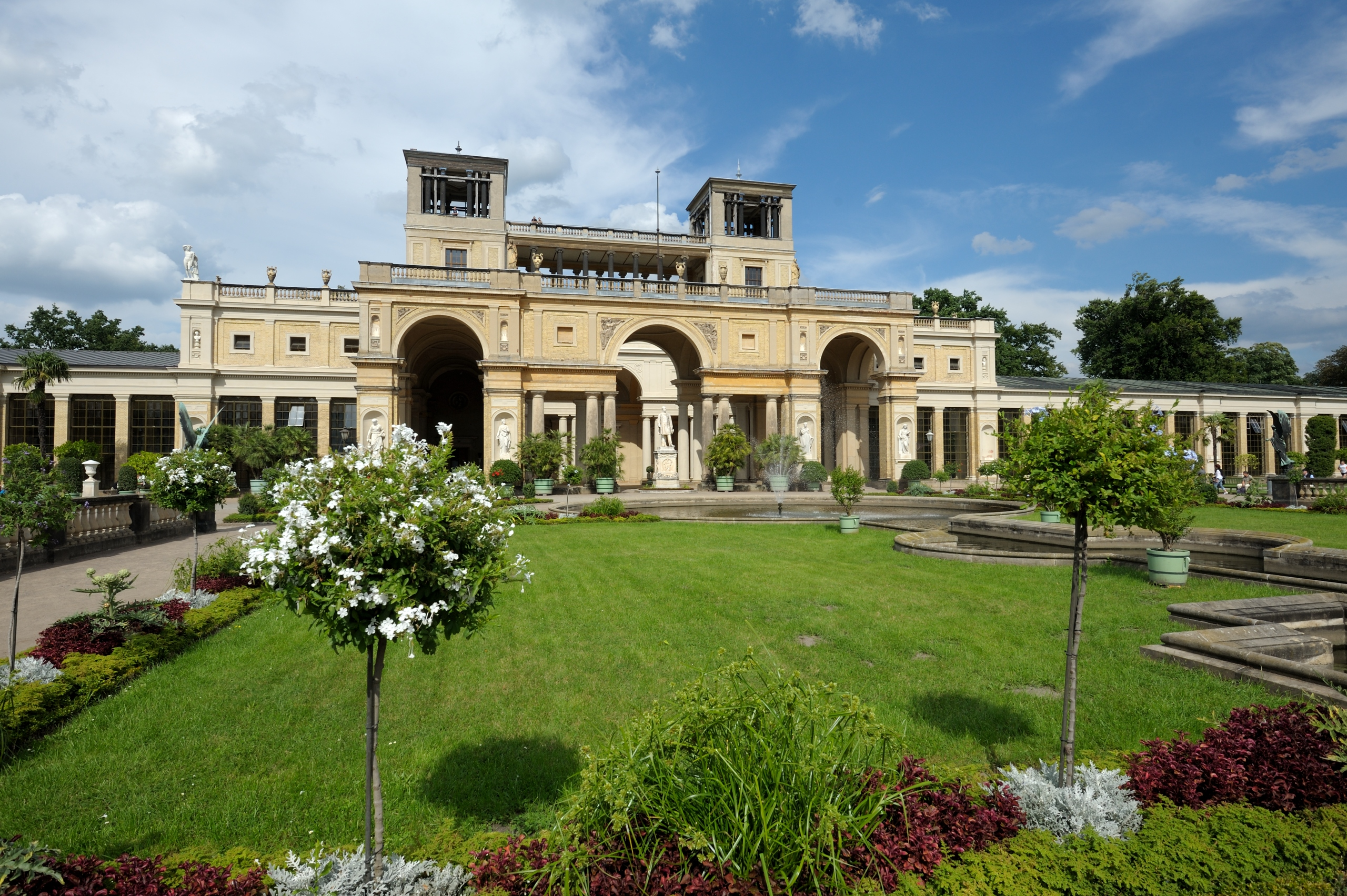
The Orangerieschloss built by Frederick William IV of Prussia in Potsdam, Germany in the mid-19th century

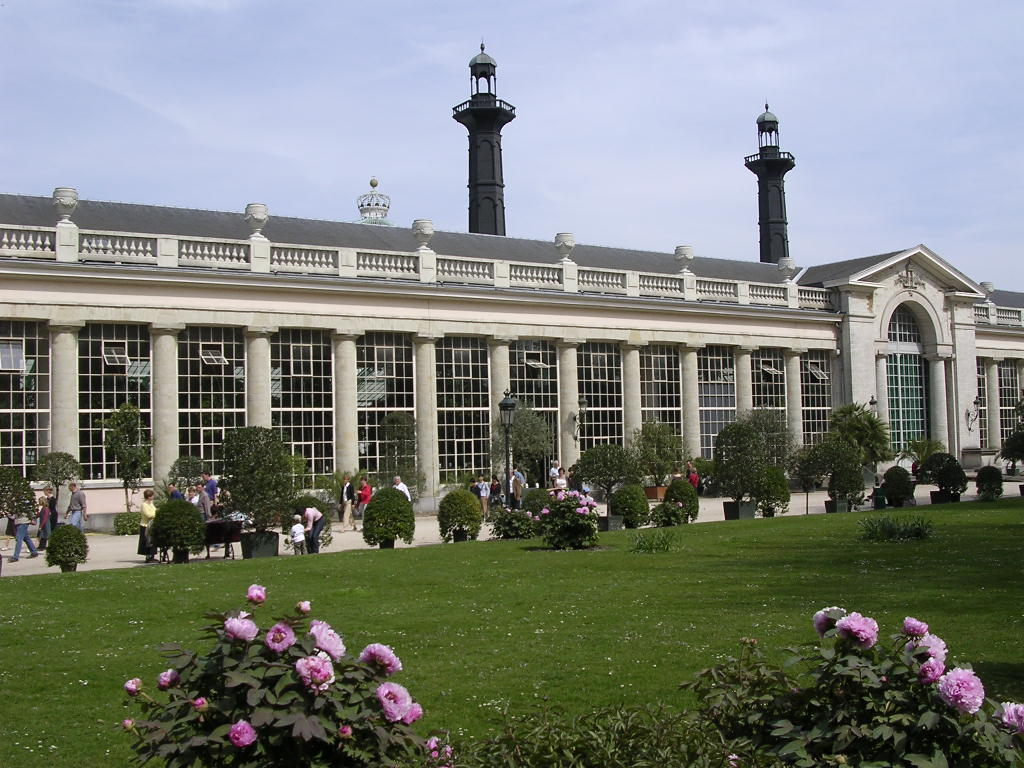
The orangerie of the Royal Castle of Laeken, Belgium (ca.1820), is the oldest part of the monumental Royal Greenhouses of Laeken.

An orangery or orangerie is a room or dedicated building, historically where orange and other non-hardy fruit trees are protected during the winter, as a large form of greenhouse or conservatory. In the modern day an orangery could refer to either a conservatory or greenhouse built to house fruit trees, or a conservatory or greenhouse meant for another purpose.

The orangery provided a luxurious extension of the normal range and season of woody plants, extending the protection which had long been afforded by the warmth offered from a masonry fruit wall. During the 17th century, fruit trees such as orange, pomegranate, and banana trees arrived in huge quantities at European ports. Since these plants were not adapted to the harsh European winters, orangeries were invented to protect and sustain them. The high cost of glass made orangeries a status symbol showing wealth and luxury. Gradually, due to technological advancements, orangeries became more of a classic architectural structure that enhanced the beauty of an estate garden, rather than a room used for wintering plants.

The orangery originated from the Renaissance gardens of Italy, when glass-making technology enabled sufficient expanses of clear glass to be produced. In the north, the Dutch led the way in developing expanses of window glass in orangeries, although the engravings illustrating Dutch manuals showed solid roofs, whether beamed or vaulted, and in providing stove heat rather than open fires. This soon created a situation where orangeries became symbols of status among the wealthy. The glazed roof, which afforded sunlight to plants that were not dormant, was a development of the early 19th century. The orangery at Dyrham Park, Gloucestershire, which had been provided with a slate roof as originally built about 1702, was given a glazed one about a hundred years later, after Humphrey Repton remarked that it was dark; although it was built to shelter oranges, it has always simply been called the "greenhouse" in modern times.

The 1617 Orangerie (now Musée de l'Orangerie) at the Palace of the Louvre inspired imitations that culminated in Europe's largest orangery, the Versailles Orangerie. Designed by Jules Hardouin-Mansart for Louis XIV's 3,000 orange trees at Versailles, its dimensions of 508 by 42 feet (155 by 13 m) were not eclipsed until the development of the modern greenhouse in the 1840s, and were quickly overshadowed by the glass architecture of Joseph Paxton, the designer of the 1851 Crystal Palace. His "great conservatory" at Chatsworth House was an orangery and glass house of monumental proportions.

The orangery, however, was not just a greenhouse but a symbol of prestige and wealth and a garden feature, in the same way as a summerhouse, folly, or "Grecian temple". Owners would conduct their guests there on tours of the garden to admire not only the fruits within but also the architecture outside. Often the orangery would contain fountains, grottos, and an area in which to entertain in inclement weather.

== Earliest examples ==
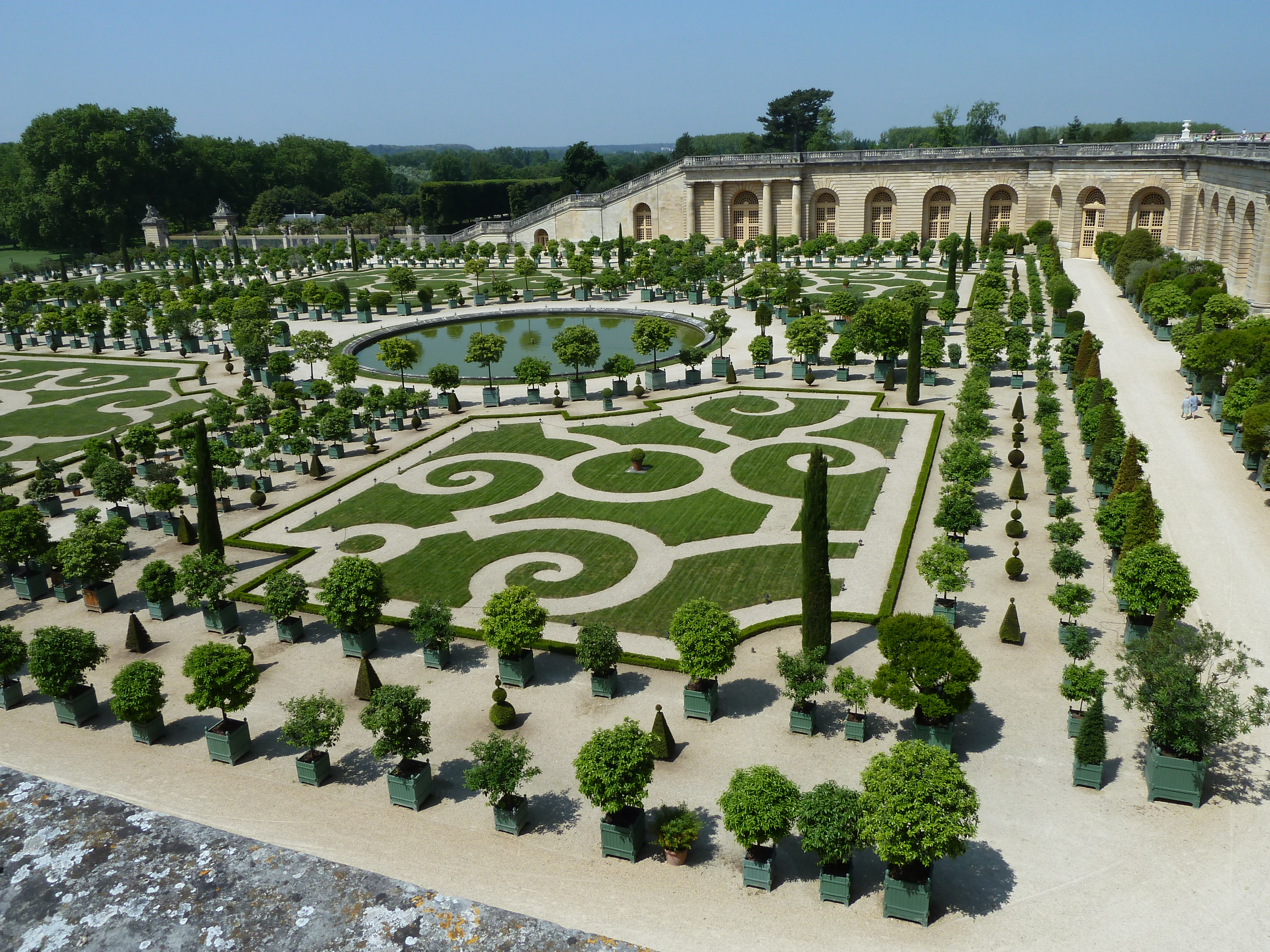
Versailles Orangerie built between 1684 and 1686

As early as 1545, an orangery was built in Padua, Italy. The first orangeries were practical and not as ornamental as they later became. Most had no heating other than open fires.

In England, John Parkinson introduced the orangery to the readers of his Paradisus in Sole (1628), under the heading "Oranges". The trees might be planted against a brick wall and enclosed in winter with a plank shed covered with "cerecloth", a waxed precursor of tarpaulin, which must have been thought handsomer than the alternative:

For that purpose, some keep them in great square boxes, and lift them to and fro by iron hooks on the sides, or cause them to be rowled by trundels, or small wheeles under them, to place them in a house or close gallery.

The building of orangeries became most widely fashionable after the end of the Eighty Years' War in 1648. The countries that started this trend were France, Germany, and the Netherlands, these countries being the ones that saw merchants begin importing large numbers of orange trees, banana plants, and pomegranates to cultivate for their beauty and scent.

== Construction materials ==
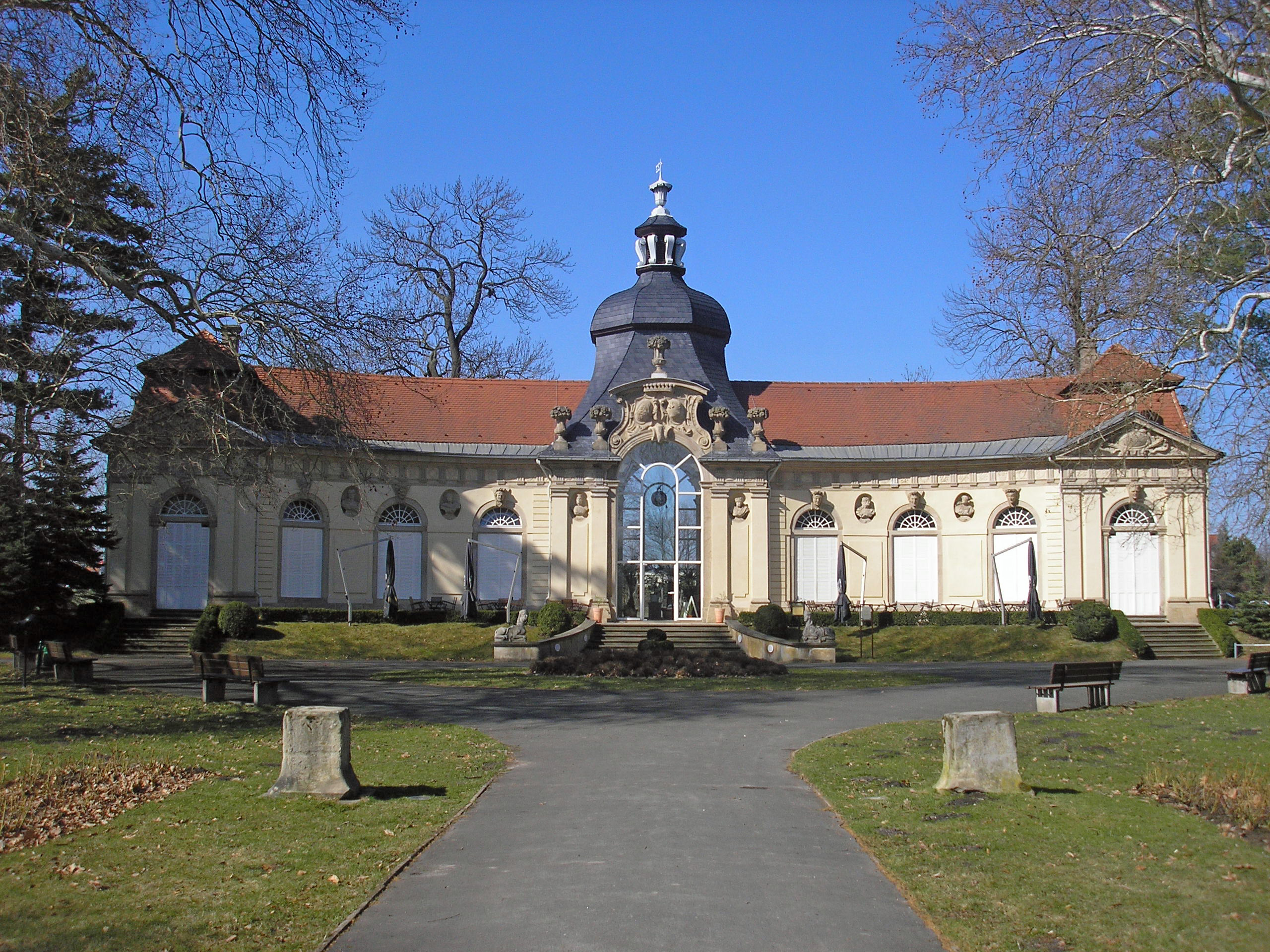
Roof lantern at Meuselwitz Orangery, Meuselwitz, Germany

Orangeries were generally built facing south to take advantage of the maximum possible light, and were constructed using brick or stone bases, brick or stone pillars, and a corbel gutter. They also featured large, tall windows to maximise available sunlight in the afternoons, with the north facing walls built without windows in a very heavy solid brick, or occasionally with much smaller windows to be able to keep the rooms warm. Insulation at these times was one of the biggest concerns for the building of these orangeries, straw became the main material used, and many had wooden shutters fitted to keep in the warmth. An early example of the type of construction can be seen at Kensington Palace, which also featured underfloor heating.

Contemporary domestic orangeries are also typically built using stone, brick, and hardwood, but developments in glass, other materials, and insulation technologies have produced viable alternatives to traditional construction. The main difference with a conservatory is in the construction of its roof – a conservatory will have more than 75 per cent of its roof glazed, while an orangery will have less than 75 per cent glazed. Domestic orangeries also typically feature a roof lantern. Improved design and insulation has also led to an increasing number of orangeries that are not built facing south, instead using light maximising techniques to make the most of available natural sunlight.

== Early orangeries ==
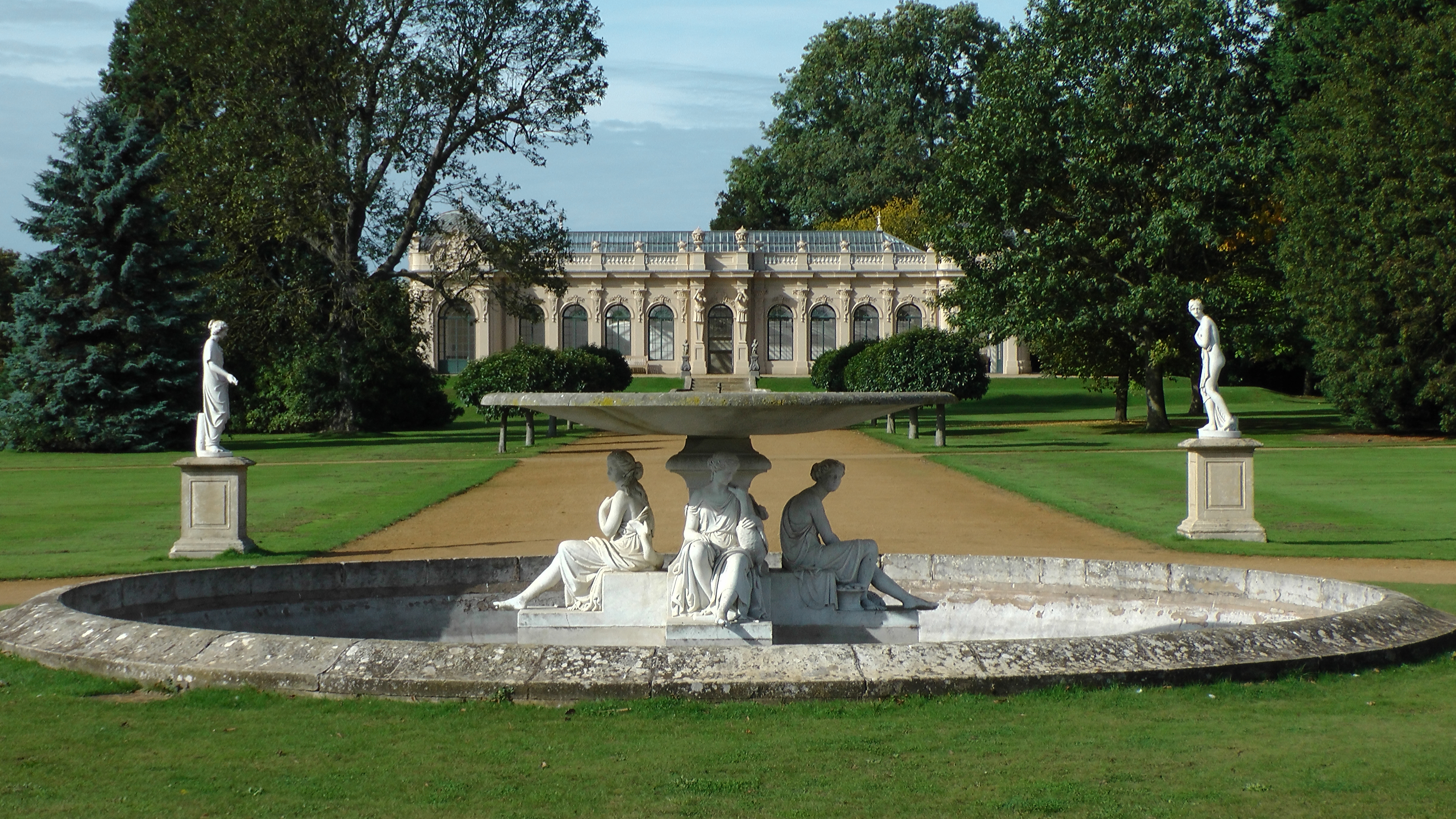
Orangery at Wrest Park

The first examples were basic constructions and could be removed during summer. Notably not only noblemen but also wealthy merchants, e.g., those of Nuremberg, used to cultivate citrus plants in orangeries. Some orangeries were built using the garden wall as the main wall of the new orangery, but as orangeries became more and more popular they started to become more and more influenced by garden designers and architects, which led to the connection between the house and architectural orangery design. This became further influenced by the increased demand for beautiful exotic plants in the garden, which could be grown and looked after in the orangeries.

This created the increased demand in garden design for the wealthy to have their own exotic private gardens, further fuelling the status of the orangery becoming even more the symbol of the elite. This in turn created the need for orangeries to be constructed using even better techniques such as underfloor heating and the ability to have opening windows in the roofs for ventilation. Creating microclimates for the propagation of more and more exotic plants for the private gardens that were becoming creations of beauty all around Europe.

== Continental Europe ==
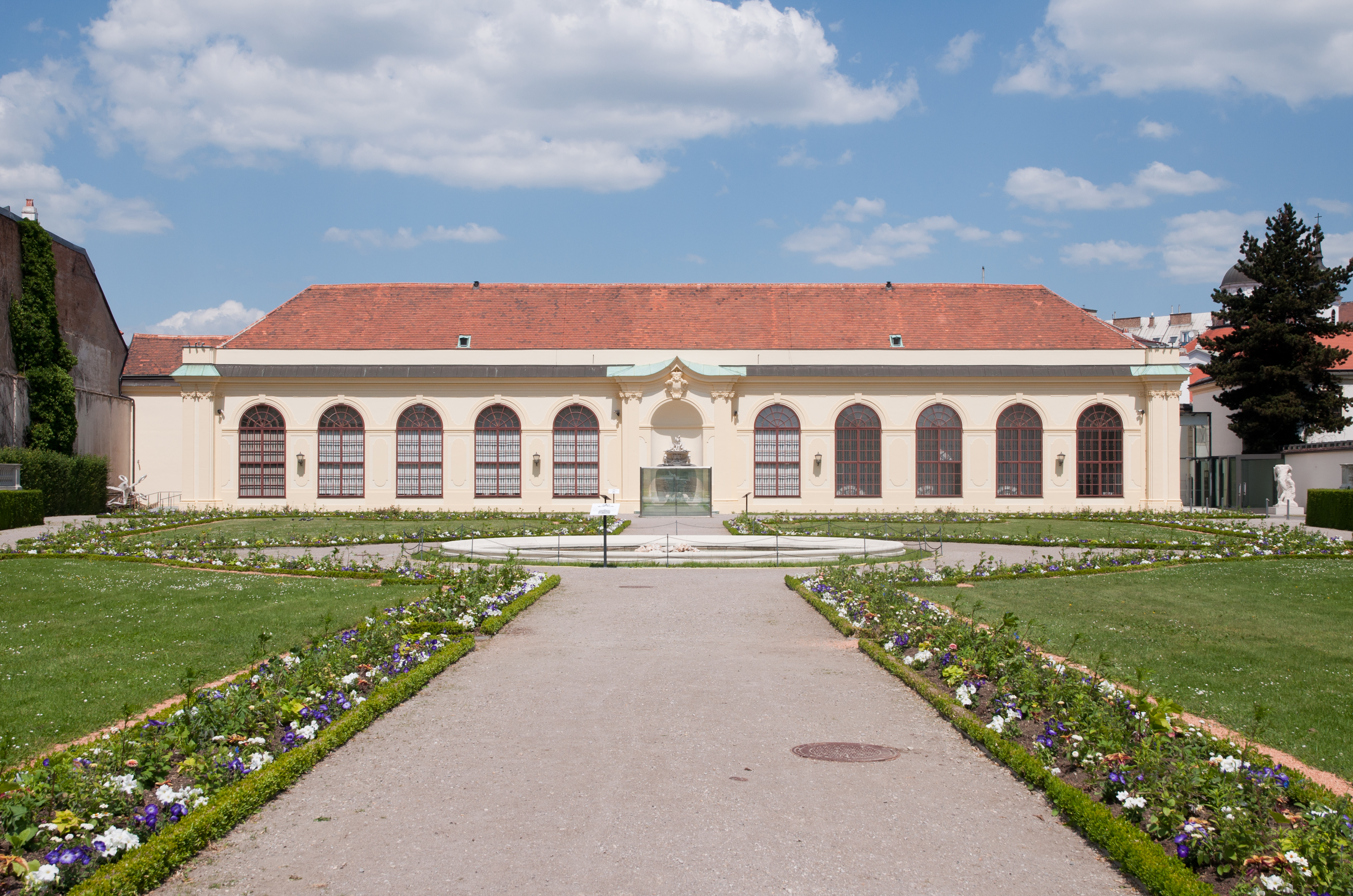
Belvedere Orangery, Vienna, Austria

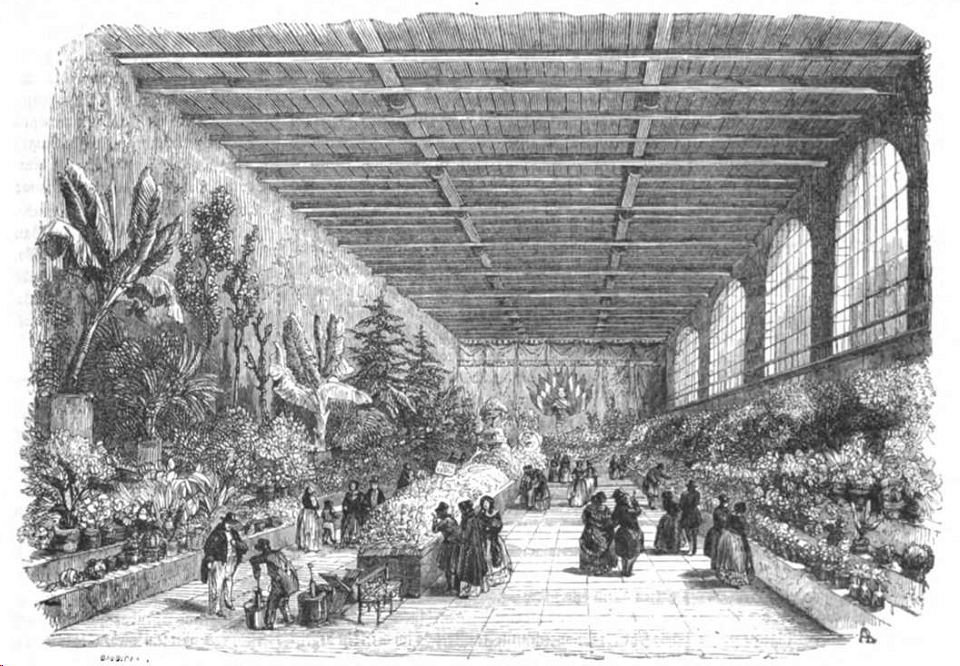
Orangerie du Senat interior, Paris, illustration from 1843

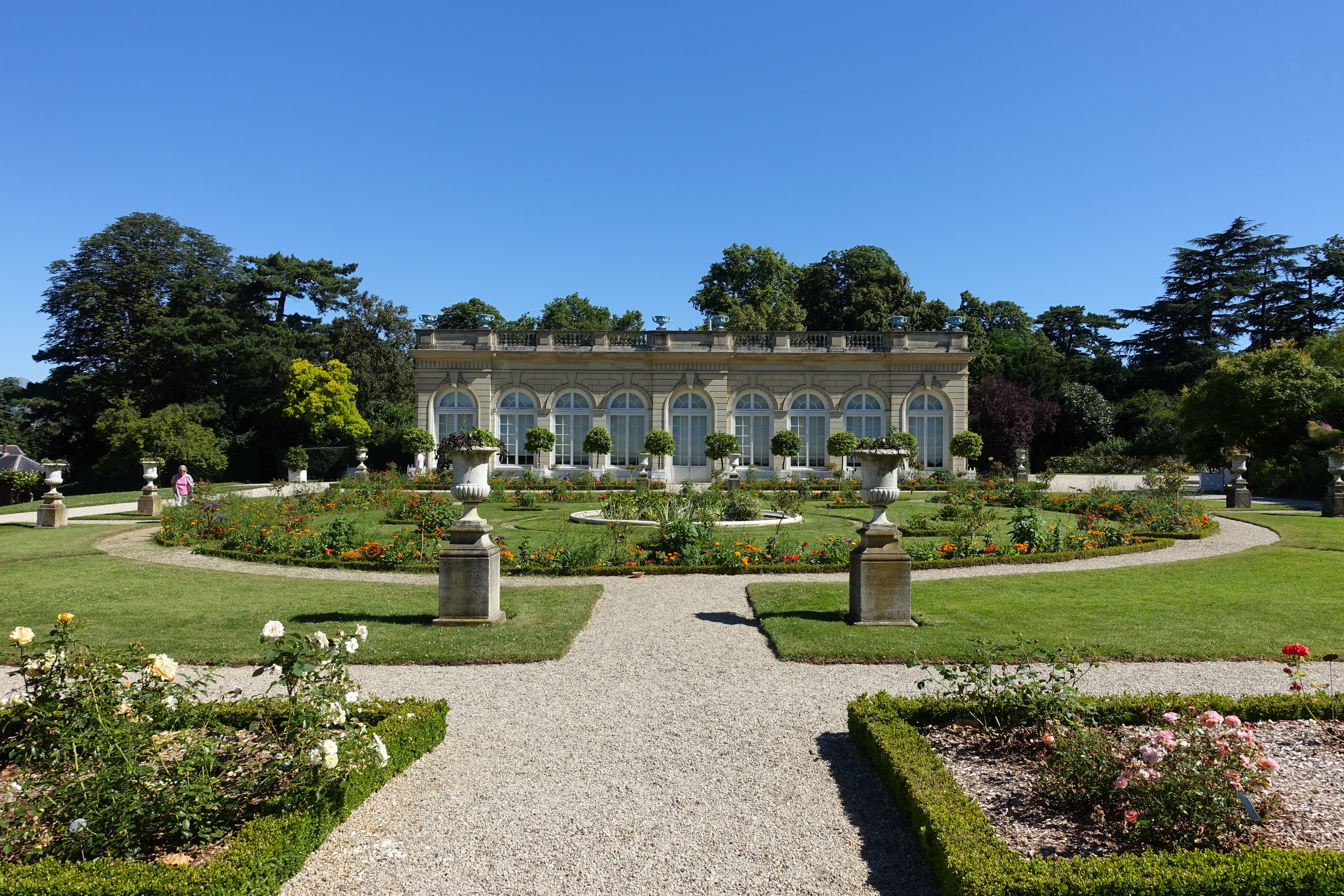
Orangery at Château de Bagatelle

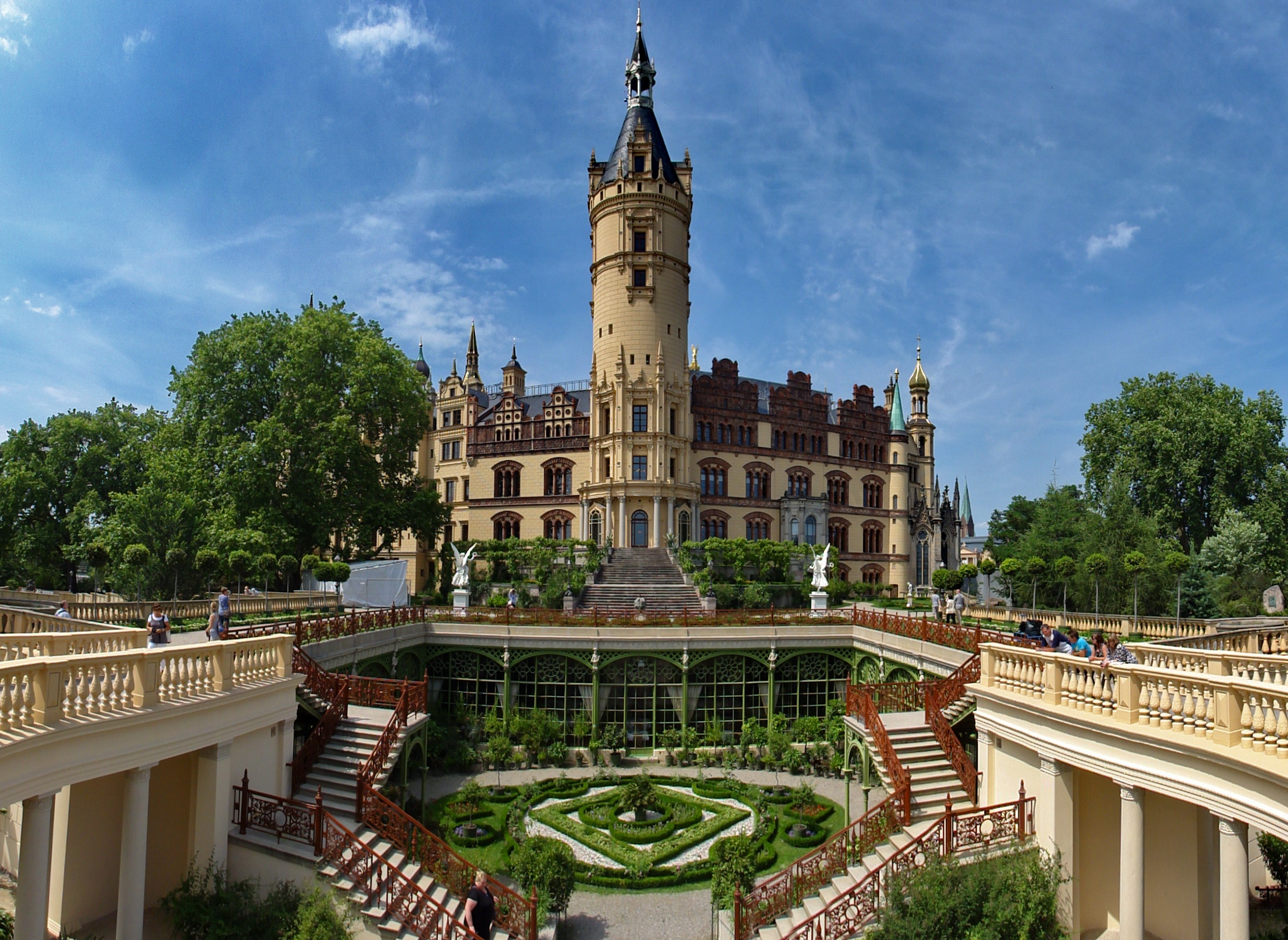
Schwerin Castle Orangery, Schwerin, Germany

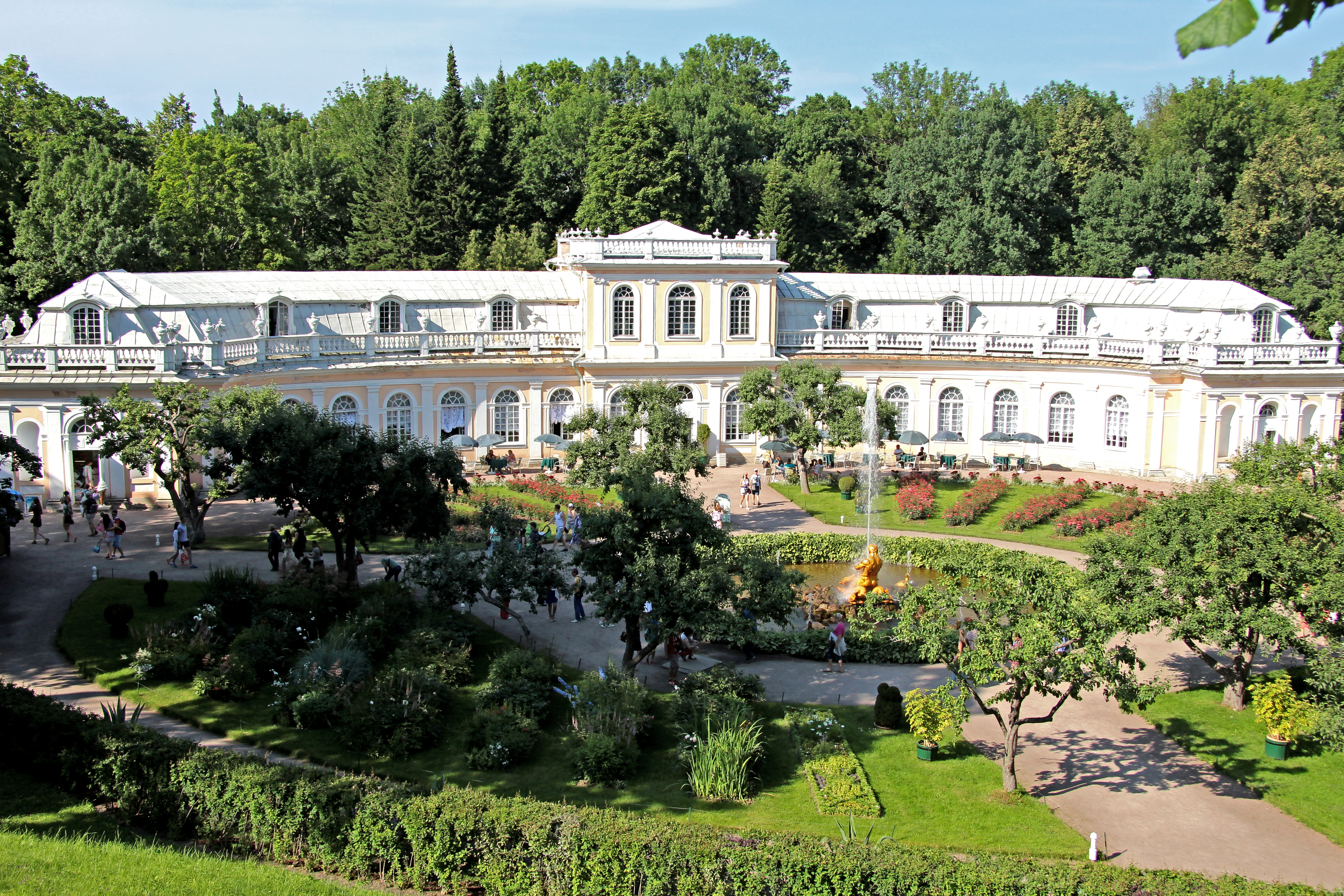
Grand Orangery (Peterhof)

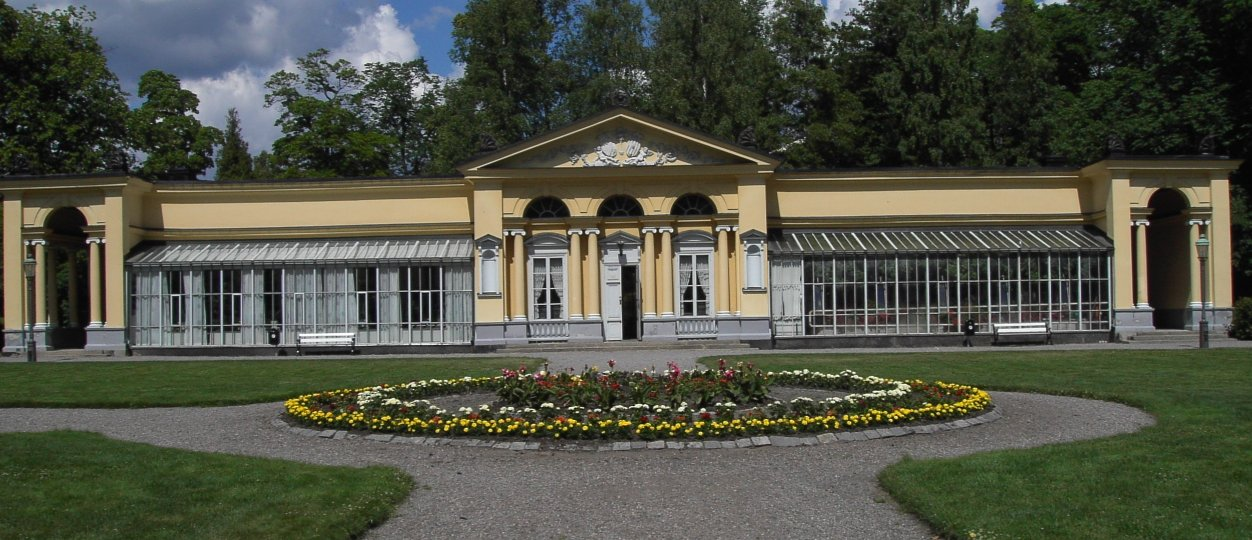
Orangerie at Finspång Castle, Sweden (1832)

=== Austria ===
- Belvedere, Vienna
- Schönbrunn, Vienna

=== France ===
- Versailles Orangerie, in the gardens of the Palace of Versailles
- Strasbourg, park of the Orangerie
- Orangerie du Senat, Jardin du Luxembourg, Paris
- Tuileries: Orangerie in the Tuileries Gardens, Paris

=== Belgium ===
- Freÿr, Orangerie of the Château de Freÿr, the collection includes some of the oldest citrus trees kept in containers, dating back to around 1700.
- Laeken, Orangerie of the Royal Castle of Laeken (ca. 1820), an exceptional collection of very tall and old citrus trees.
- Mariemont, Orangerie of the Domaine de Mariemont (ca. 1850 in its present form)
- Seneffe, Orangerie of the Château de Seneffe (ca. 1765)

=== Germany ===
- Darmstadt, Orangerie
- Düsseldorf-Benrath, Orangerie
- Fulda, Orangerie
- Gera, Orangery and "Küchengarten"
- Hanover, a part of the Herrenhausen Gardens
- Ingolstadt, Orangerie in Harderstraße 10
- Kassel, Orangerie
- Oldenburg, Cactus House
- Philippsthal, Orangerie
- Potsdam, Orangery Palace
- Schwerin, Schwerin Castle, Orangerie
- Weimar, Belvedere Orangerie
- Wertheim am Main, Bronnbach abbey

=== Italy ===
- Palace of Venaria, Citroneria (en: Orangery, built by Filippo Juvarra)

=== Poland ===
- Warsaw, Stara Pomarańczarnia (en: Old Orangery; built 1786–1788) and Nowa Pomarańczarnia (en: New Orangery; built 1860) at the Royal Łazienki Park

=== Russia ===
- Peterhof, Bolshaya Kamennya Oranzhereya
- Tsarskoe Selo, Bolshaya Oranzhereya (1762, 1820)
- Kuskovo, Moscow, Oranzhereya (illustration, right)

=== Sweden ===
- Linneanum, Botaniska trädgården (Uppsala) – The Orangery, Botanical Garden, Uppsala University 1787
- Linnéträdgården, Uppsala 1655
- Finspång Castle Orangerie 1832
- Nynäs Slott, Manorial Estate (Castle) and Orangery, Nynäs
- Bergianska trädgården, Stockholm, gamla orangeriet, now used as a restaurant

== Great Britain and Ireland ==
The orangery built adjacent to Kensington Palace, believed to be designed by Nicholas Hawksmoor, was constructed between 1704 and 1705.

The orangery at the Royal Botanic Gardens, Kew, was designed in 1761 by Sir William Chambers and at one time was the largest glasshouse in England.

The orangery at Margam Park, Wales, was built between 1787 and 1793 to house a large collection of orange, lemon, and citron trees inherited by Thomas Mansel Talbot. The original house has been razed, but the surviving orangery, at 327 feet (100 m), is the longest one in Wales.

An orangery dating from about 1700 is at Kenwood House in London, and a slightly earlier one at Montacute. Other orangeries in the hands of the National Trust include:

- Ham House, Richmond, Surrey, in brick, a somewhat less fancy building than others, placed at the end of the walled kitchen garden.
- Hanbury Hall, Worcestershire
- Croome Court, called the "Temple Greenhouse"; an elaborate Roman temple facade designed by Robert Adam in 1761.
- Ickworth House, Suffolk, where it forms part of the garden front of the dwelling wings
- Powis Castle, Montgomeryshire, a central feature on the late-18th-century terraces
- Saltram House, Devon, probably to a Robert Adam design
- Seaton Delaval Hall, Northumberland
- Blickling, Norfolk
- Gibside, in Gateshead, near Newcastle-upon-Tyne, now a ruined shell

In 1970, Victor Montagu constructed an orangery in his formal Italianate gardens at Mapperton, Dorset.

A mid-19th-century orangery at Norton Hall in Sheffield, England, has been converted to apartments.

In Ireland, orangeries were built at Killruddery House and Loughcrew House.

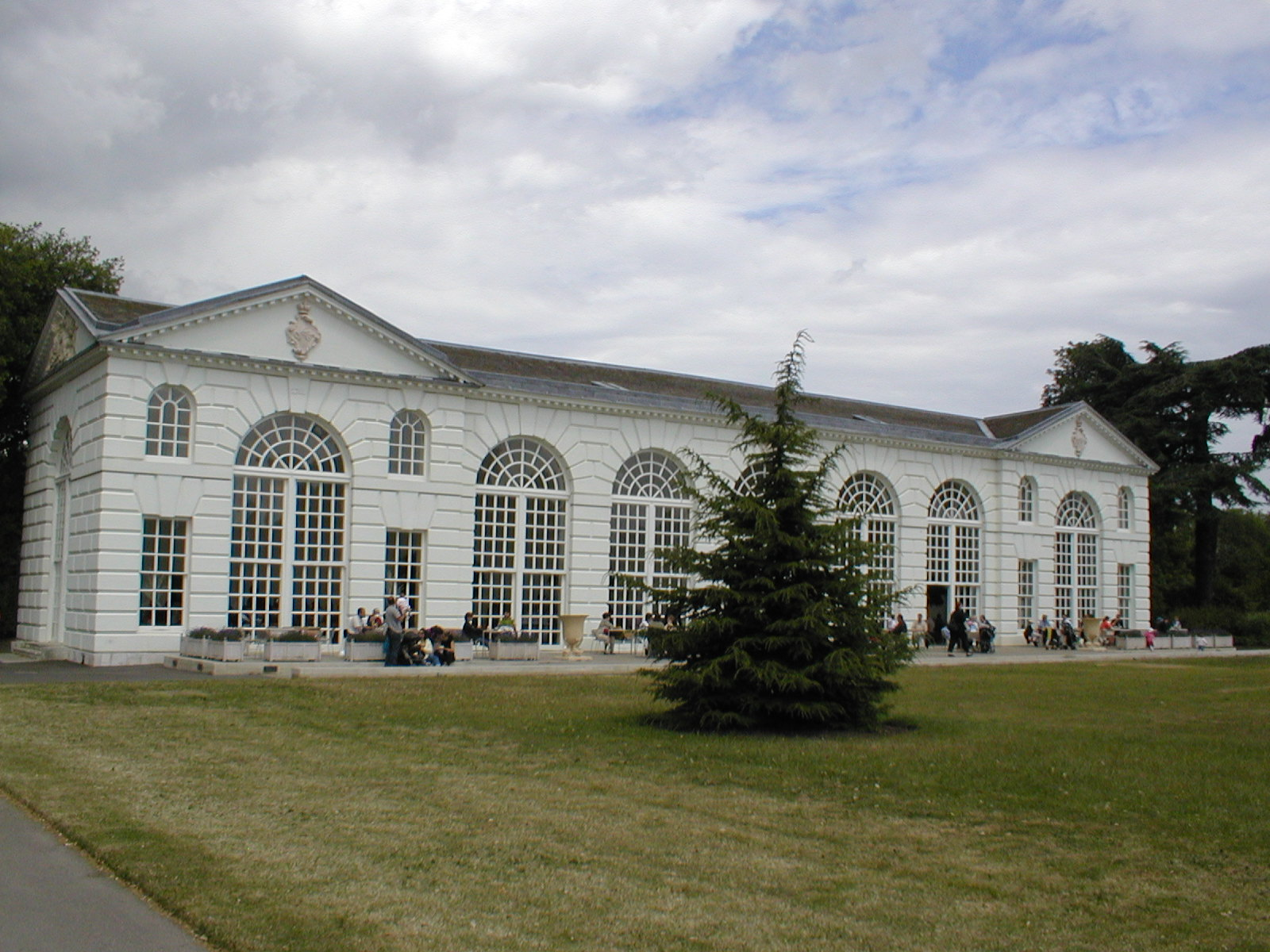
The Orangery at Royal Botanic Gardens, Kew, now used as a restaurant

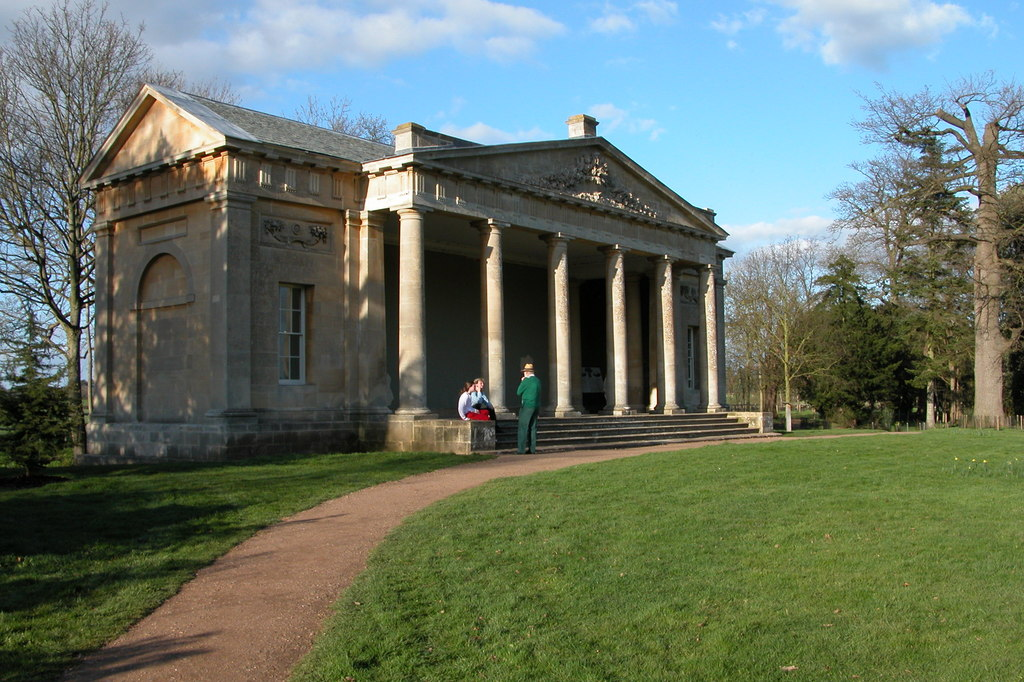
The "Temple Greenhouse" of Croome Court, 1761, now a cafe

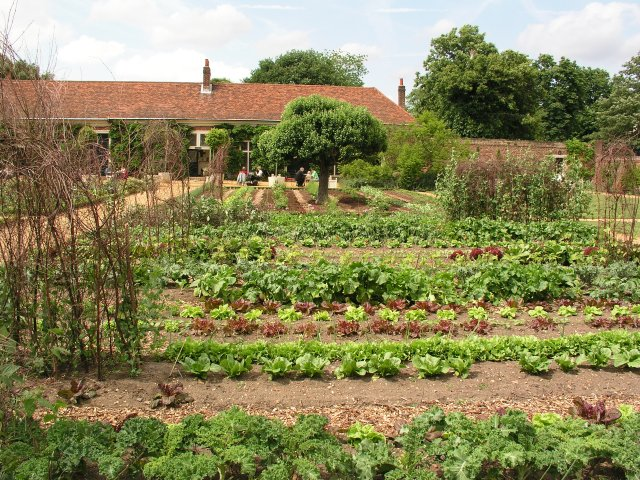
Ham House, kitchen garden with the orangery at the end (now a cafe)

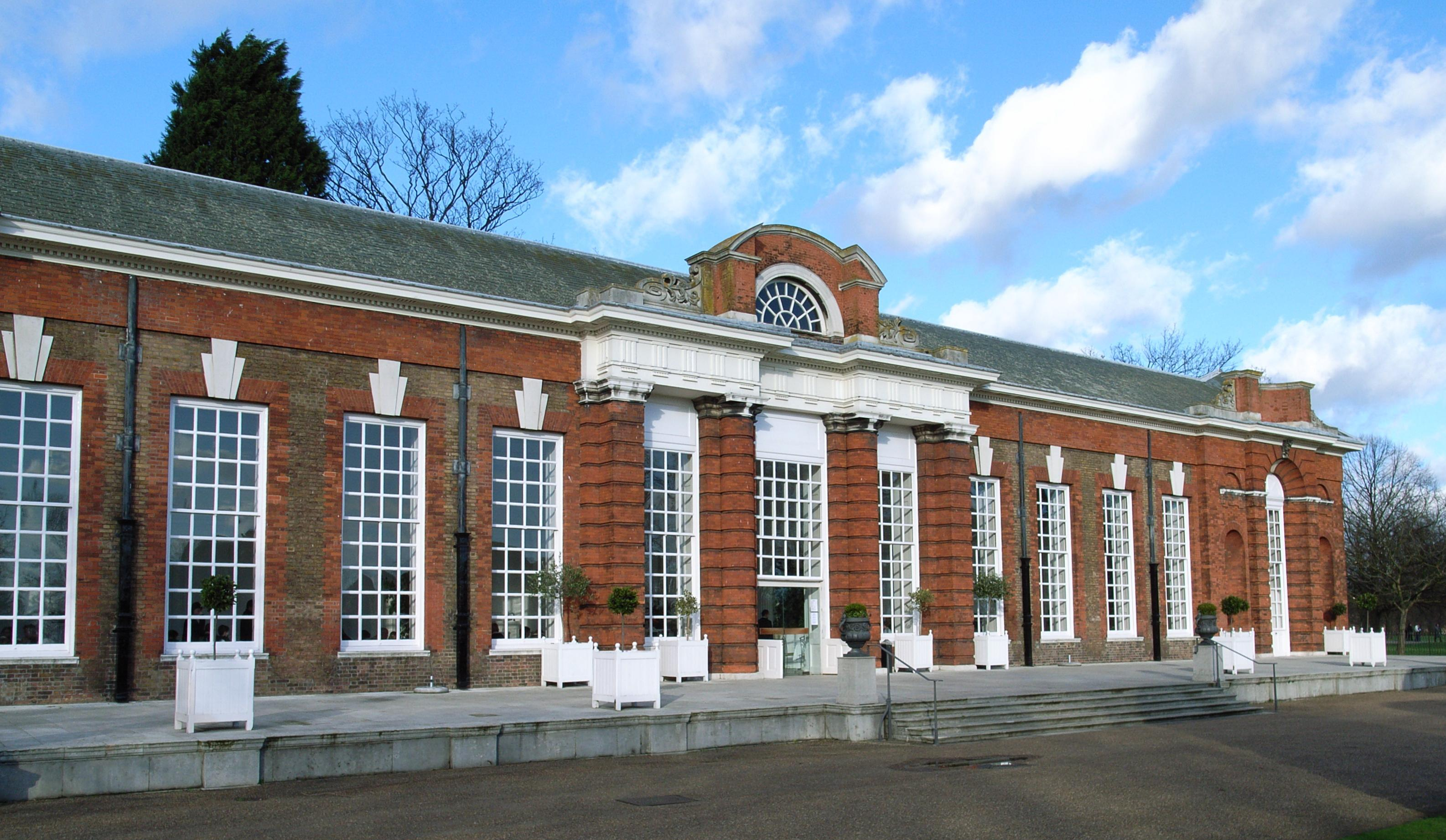
Kensington Palace Orangery

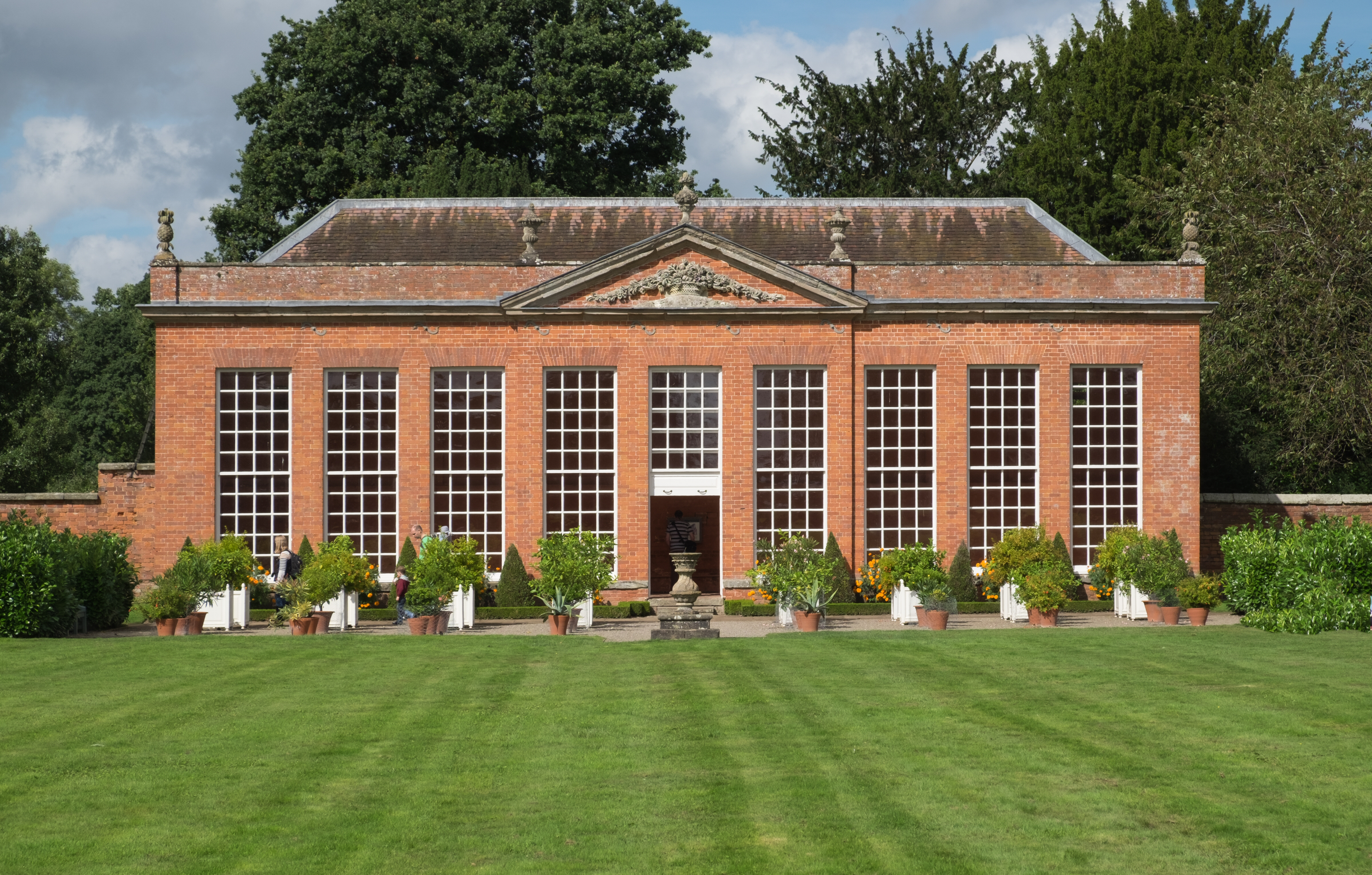
The orangery and mushroom house at Hanbury Hall

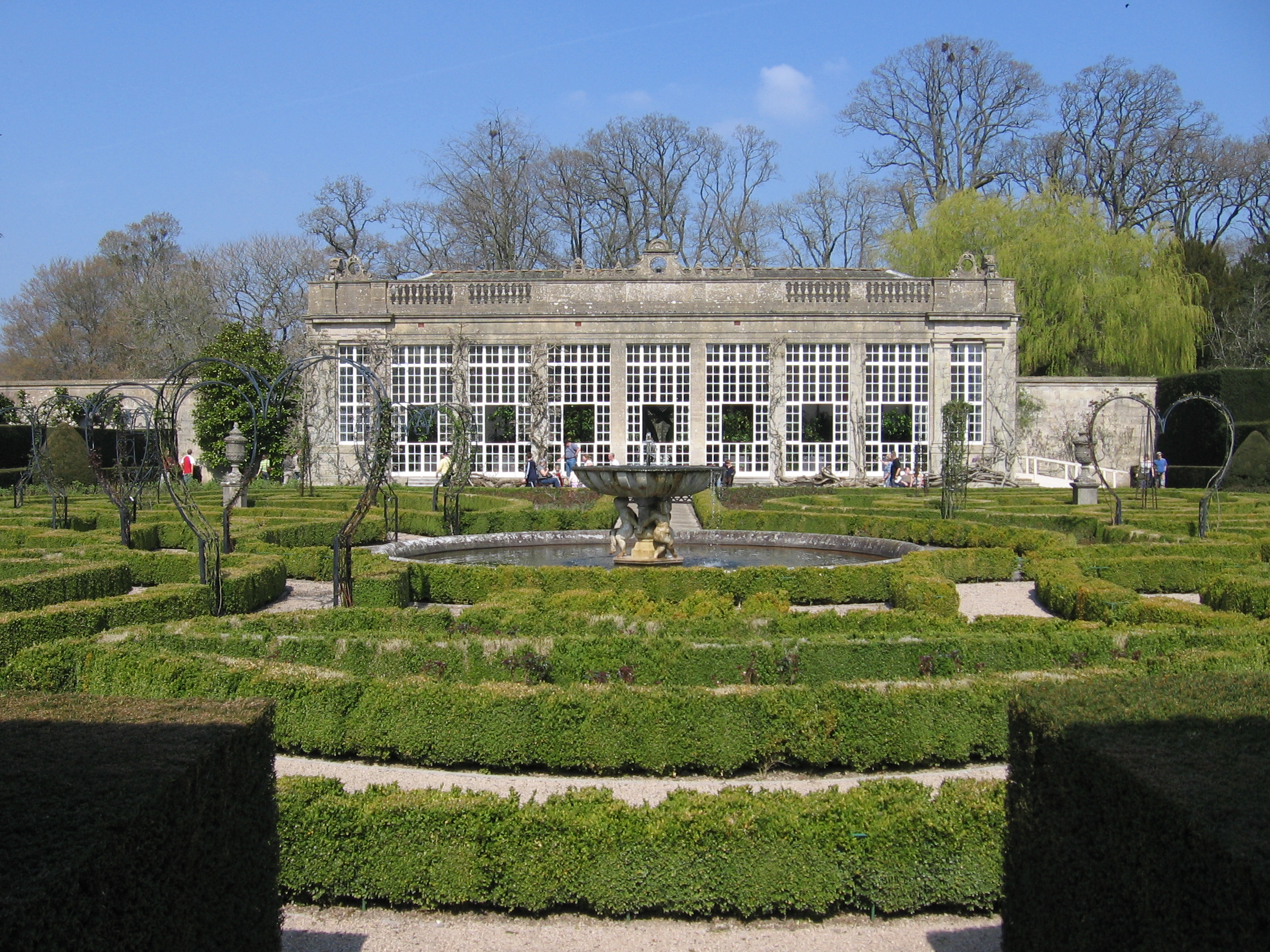
Orangery and maze at Longleat

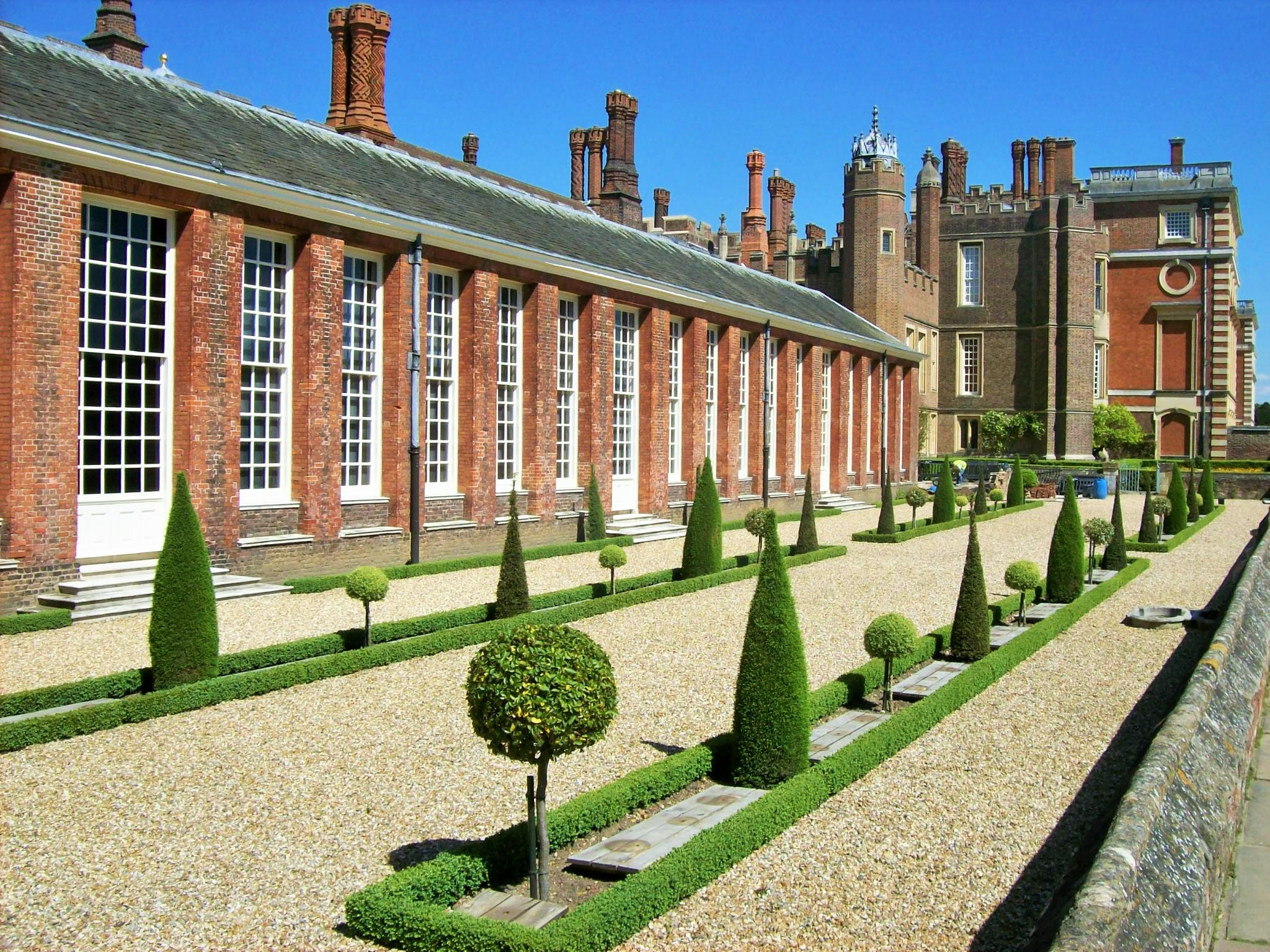
Hampton Court orangery

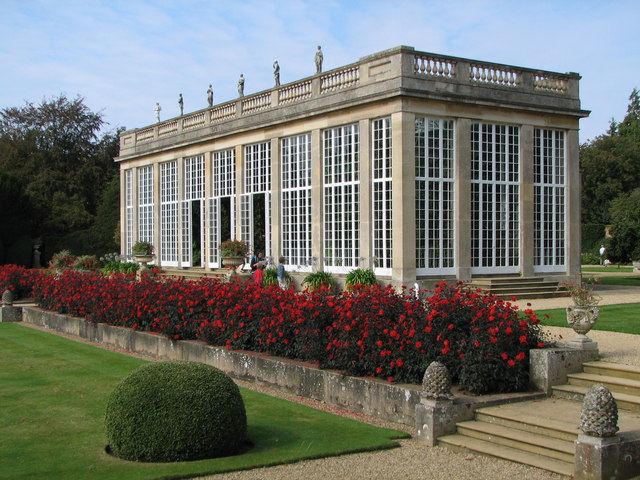
Orangery, Belton House

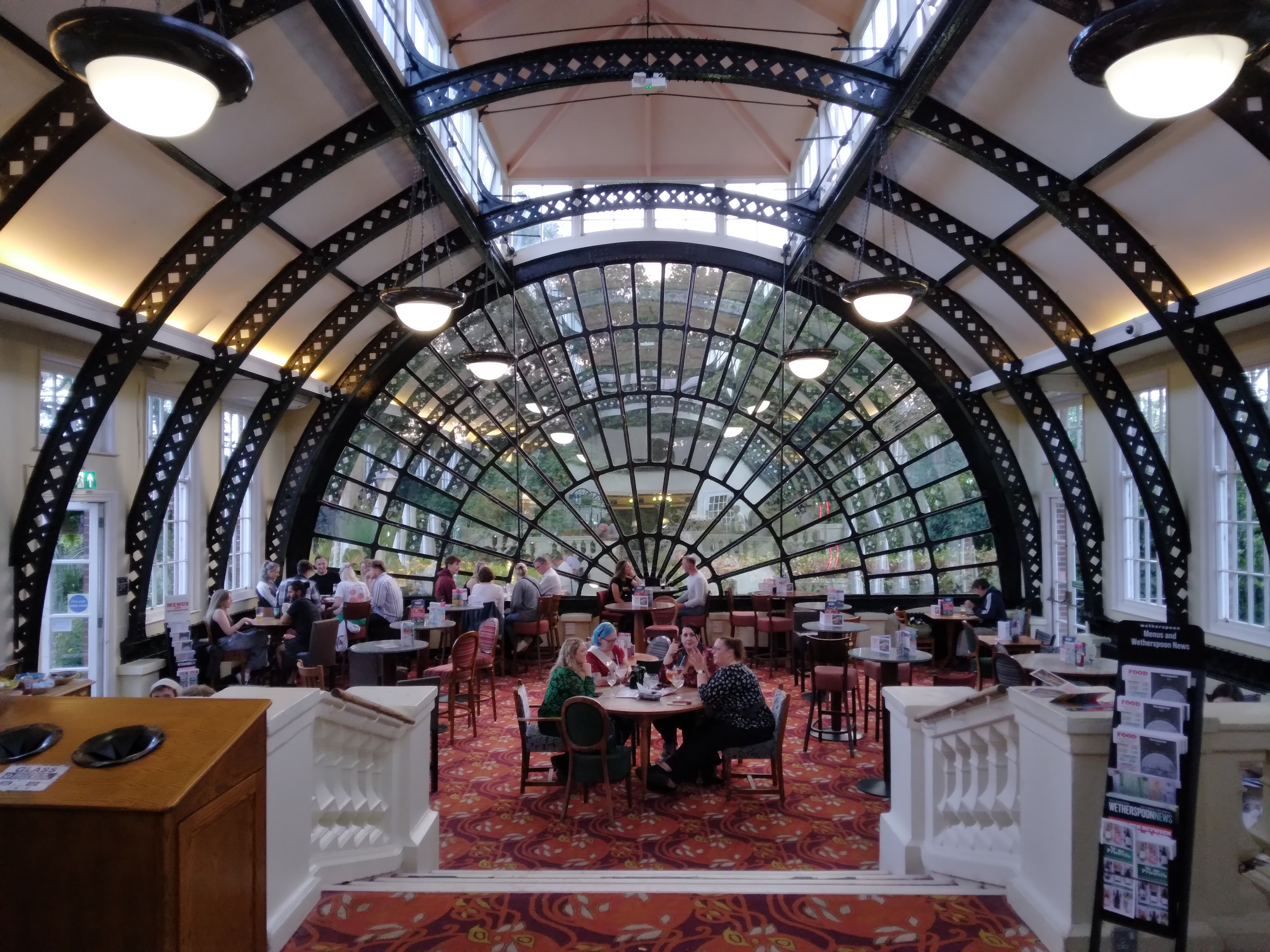
A converted orangery (originally a heated palm house), which now constitutes part of a JD Wetherspoon pub in Exeter

== United States ==
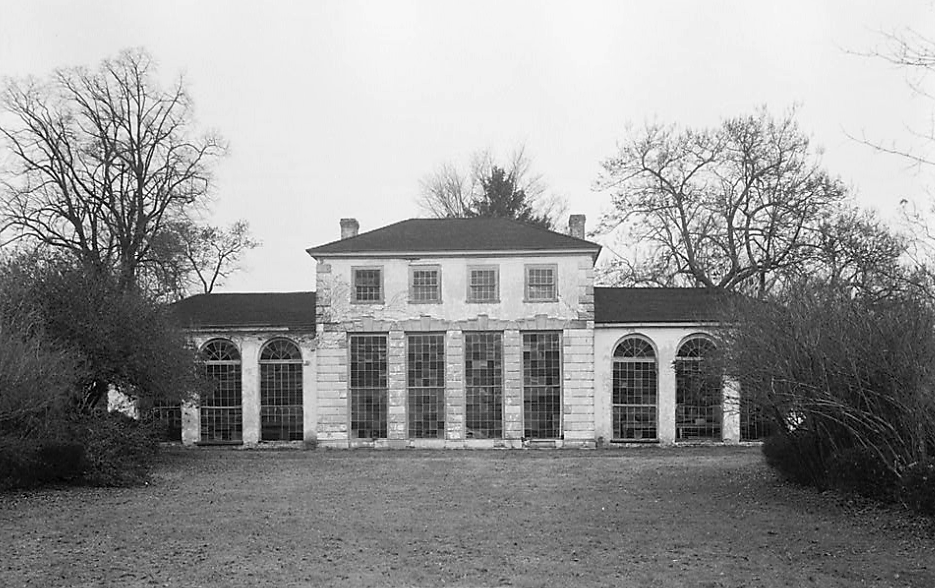
Wye Plantation Orangery photographed in 1937

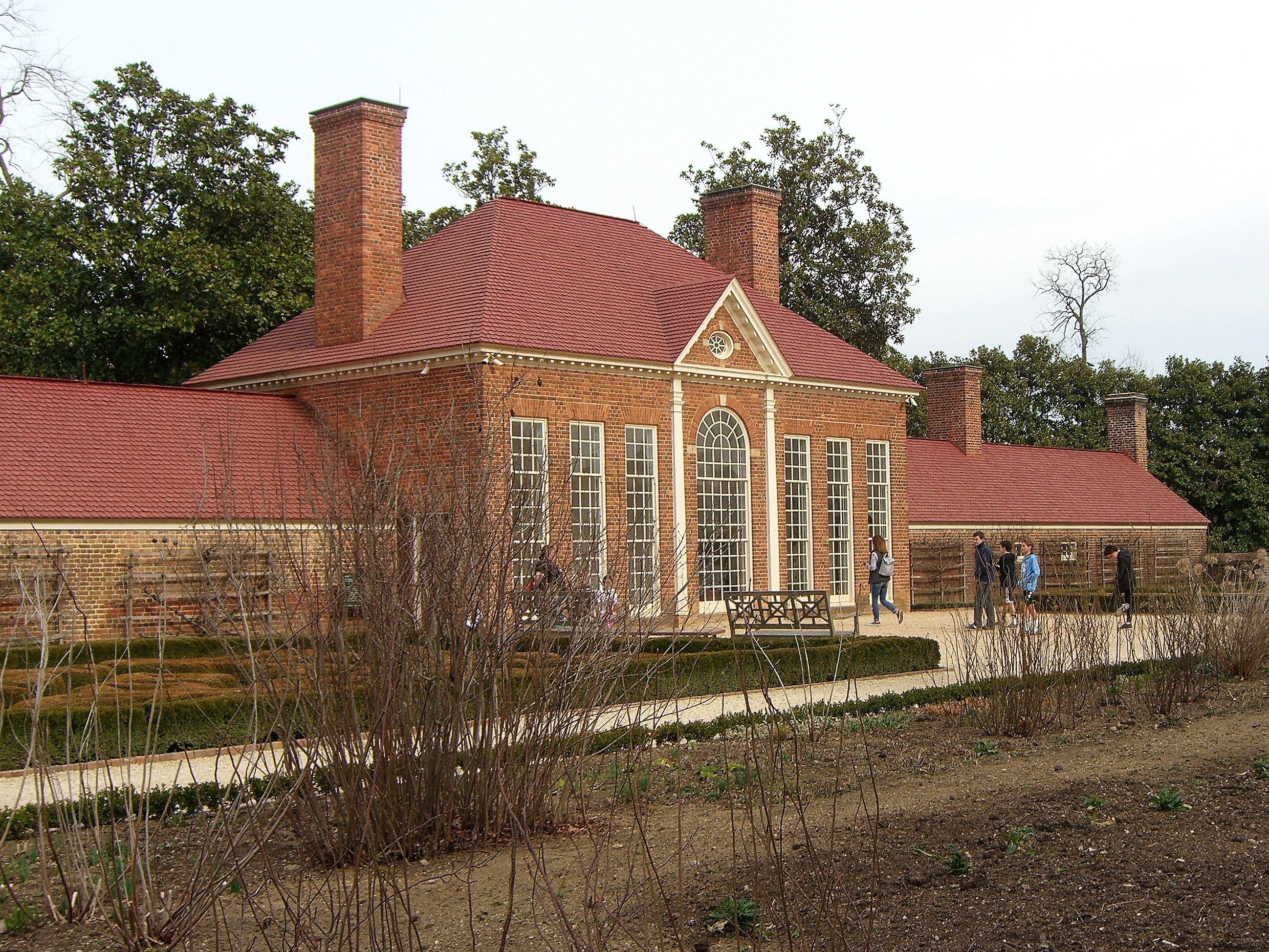
The reconstructed Mount Vernon Orangery designed by George Washington

=== 18th century ===
In the United States, the earliest partially intact surviving orangery is at the Tayloe family seat, Mount Airy, but today is an overgrown ruin, consisting only of one major wall and portions of the others' foundations. A ruined orangery can also be seen in the gardens of Eyre Hall in Northampton County, Virginia.

The oldest-known extant orangery in America can be seen at the Wye House, near Tunis Mills (Easton), Maryland. The builder, Edward Lloyd IV, had married Elizabeth Tayloe, the daughter of John Tayloe II, builder of the aforementioned Mount Airy. This orangery sits behind the main house, and consists of a large open room with two smaller wings added at some point after the initial construction. The south-facing wall consists of large triple-hung windows. A second story was traditionally part of the style of orangeries at the time of its construction in the middle to late 18th century as a way of further insulating the main section where the plants were kept. According to the current resident, Ms. Tilghman (a descendant of the Lloyd family), it served as a billiards room for the family. This plantation is also notable as having been the home of Frederick Douglass as a young slave boy.

George Washington designed and constructed an orangery for his home at Mount Vernon, Virginia. His contemporaries considered it an ambitious structure; it was designed in the Georgian Style of architecture and stands just north of the mansion facing the upper garden. Completed in 1787, it is one of the largest buildings on the Mount Vernon estate. Washington grew lemon and orange trees and sago palms there. The main room featured a vaulted ceiling for air circulation, and incorporated radiant heating from a series of flues under the floor. The original greenhouse burned down in 1835, but was rebuilt on the same site in 1951 using original plans.

=== 19th century ===
The Dumbarton Oaks estate in Washington, D.C., includes an orangery built in 1810 that is now used to house gardenias, oleander, and citrus plants during the winter.

Another orangery stands at Hampton National Historic Site near Towson, Maryland. Originally built in 1820, it was part of one of the most extensive collections of citrus trees in the U.S. by the mid-19th century. The current structure is a reconstruction built in the 1970s to replace the original, which burned in 1926.

The orangery at the Battersea Historic Site in Petersburg, Virginia, is currently under restoration. Originally built between 1823 and 1841, it was converted into a garage in a later period.

In the late 19th century, Florence Vanderbilt and husband Hamilton Twombly built an orangerie on their estate, Florham, designed by architects McKim, Mead & White. It is now on the Florham Campus of Fairleigh Dickinson University.

=== 20th century ===
An 18th-century style orangery was built in the 1980s at the Tower Hill Botanic Garden in Boylston, Massachusetts.

== See also ==
- Cupola
- Daylighting

== Bibliography ==
- May Woods and Arete Swartz Warren

Glass Houses: A History of Greenhouses, Orangeries and Conservatories, Rizzoli, 1988
