= Anseremme =

Village in Wallonia, Belgium

Coordinates: 50.2383°N 4.9056°E

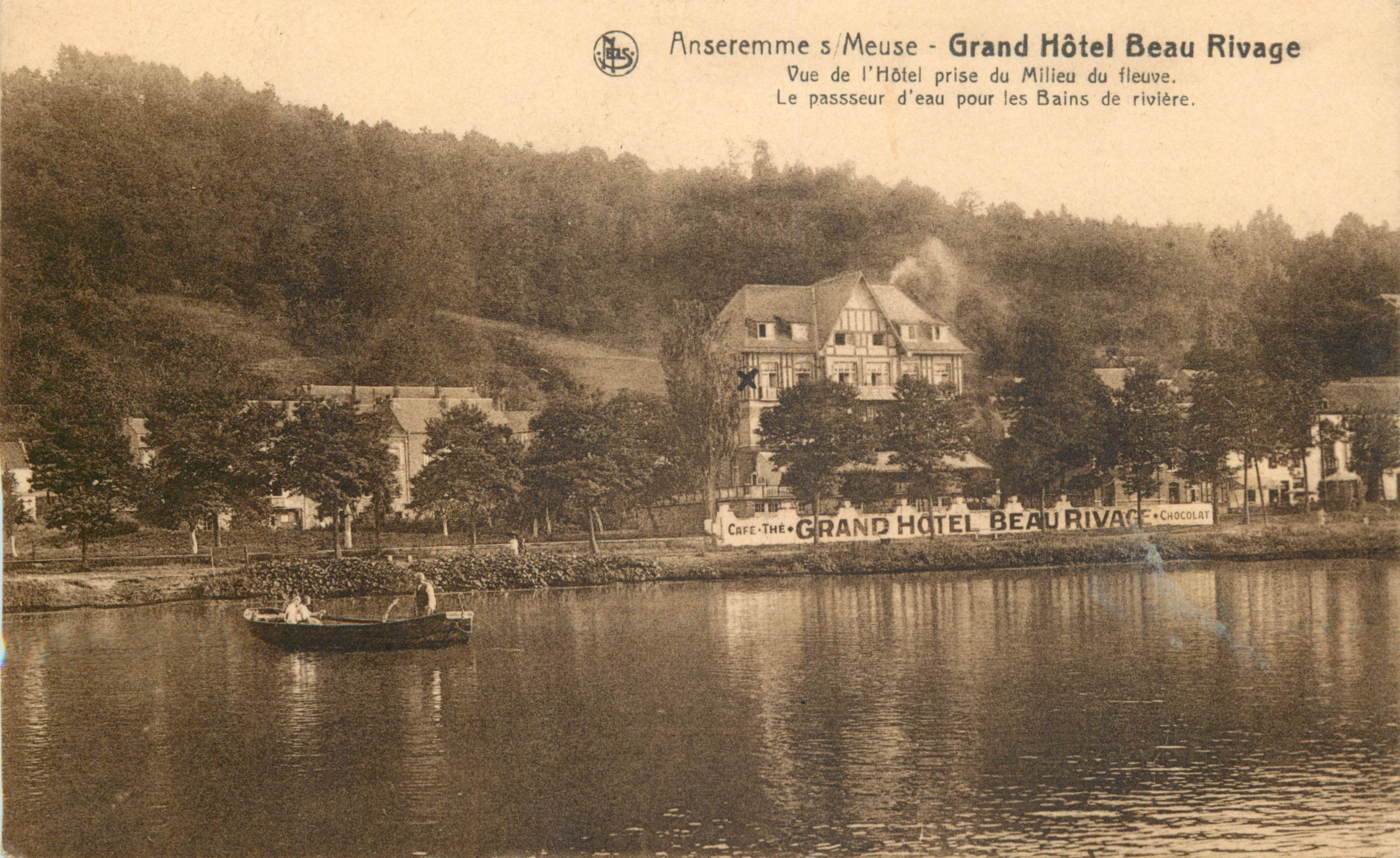
Grand Hotel Beau Rivage, Anseremme (postcard sent in 1929)

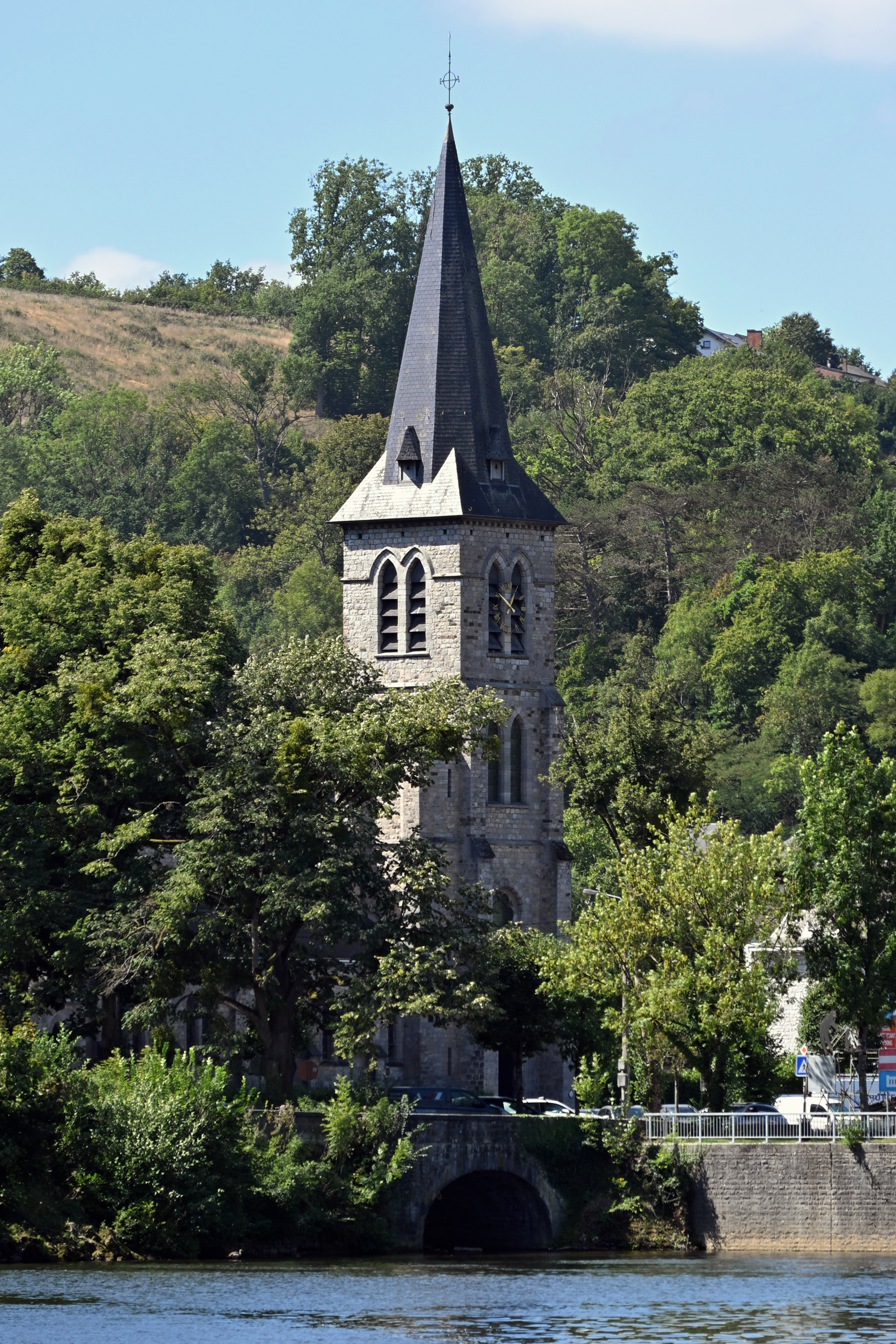
Église Saint-Anne in Anseremme (2025)

Anseremme (French pronunciation: [ɑ̃sʁɛm]; Walloon: Ansreme) is a village of Wallonia and a district of the municipality of Dinant, located in the province of Namur, Belgium.

Anseremme is situated where the river Lesse and Meuse meet. The agricultural sector and tourism are the most important source of income for the region.

== History ==
The municipality used to be a department of the Sambre and Meuse which was a French department of the Netherlands. Since the fifteenth century and for more than two hundred years, the area was under control by an old and mighty Dinant family, the Aux Brebis.

== Tourism ==
Several tourism-related businesses offer a rental service for Kayak from Gendron (12 km) or Houyet (21 km) to sail down the river Lesse. Belgium's most important rock climbing area, Rochers de Freyr, is situated south of Anseremme towards Falmigoul.
