= Castle of Freÿr =

15th-century castle in Wallonia, Belgium

Coordinates: 50.2260°N 4.8890°E

- Wallonia, Belgium
- The castle of Freÿr seen from the grand alley

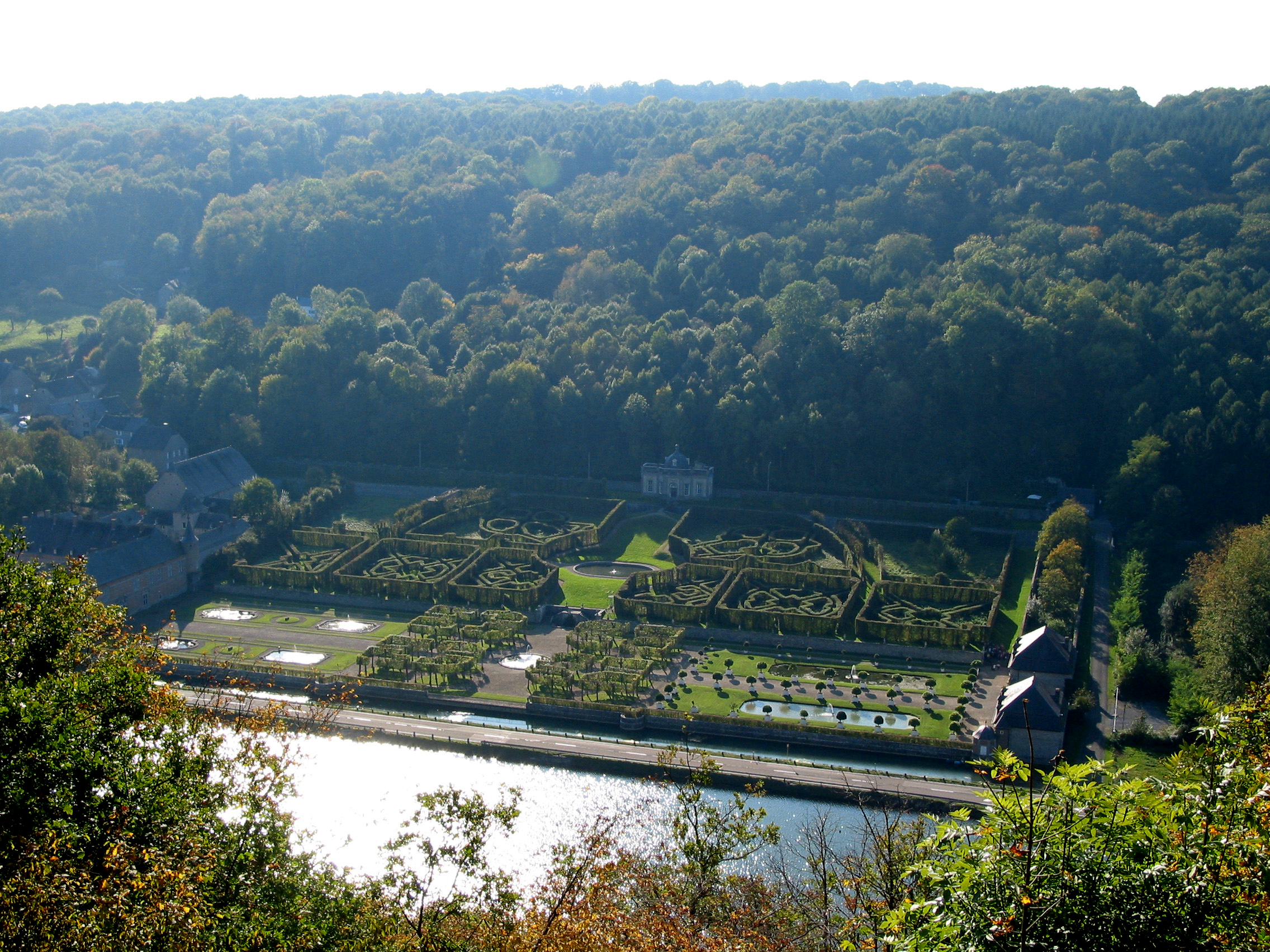
- Castle and Gardens of Freÿr seen from the Rocks

Site information
- Type: Hunting Lodge

Site history
- Built: 15th century
- Built by: Guillaume de Beaufort-Spontin

The Castle of Freÿr (French: Château de Freÿr，French pronunciation: [ʃato də fʁɛjʁ]) with its gardens in the style of Le Nôtre is located in Wallonia on the left bank of the Meuse, between Waulsort and Dinant (province of Namur, Belgium). They form one of the most magnificent natural sites in Belgium. It has been classified as one of Wallonia's major heritage sites. It is often called a greatly reduced Versailles. Originally a Renaissance castle, it was extended in the 18th century and was once the residence of dukes and their royal guests. It has gardens including orange trees. The more than three-hundred-year-old orangeries are the oldest in the Low Countries.

== The castle ==
Dating back to the Middle Ages, Freÿr was a keep given in fief by the Count of Namur to Jean de Rochefort Orjol in 1378. His granddaughter Marie married Jacques de Beaufort in 1410. Their descendants have kept the estate until the present.

== Outside ==
The keep was destroyed in 1554 by the French during the wars against Emperor Charles V. The oldest part of the current castle, the east wing, was built in 1571 and is one of the first examples of the "Renaissance Mosane" style.

During the 17th century the house was enlarged by the addition of three wings, forming a square with the original wing.

Around 1760 the south wing was pulled down and replaced by a wrought iron gate reminiscent of Jean Lamour's masterpiece in Nancy, closing the inner yard to give the castle its current appearance.

== Inside ==
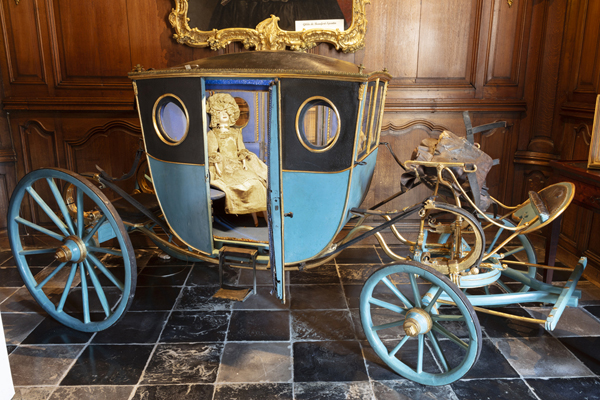
Children's coach (18th century)

The castle is representative of the interior of a nobleman's summer residence of the 18th century. It features many original elements such as the impressive main hall with wall paintings by Frans Snyders and a ceiling covered by Louis XV style frescoes, or the chapel with its Regency wooden panelling and its Baroque altar.

The rooms contain the ancient furniture of the Dukes of Beaufort-Spontin as well as traces of history left by royal guests (King Louis XIV, Archduchess Maria-Christina, fifth child (and third to reach adult age) of Empress Maria Theresa of Austria, King Stanislas I), and the living memory of 20 generations, among which is a delightful children's coach (18th century) that won the first prize at Paris World Exhibition (1889).

At Freÿr the Coffee Treaty or Treaty of Freÿr (1675) between France and Spain was signed, and the Treaty of the Borders between France and the Prince-Bishopric of Liège (1772) was negotiated. In the room where the treaty was signed, first time in Belgium was served coffee. At this time Louis XIV stayed here as the guest of Jeanne d'Harscamp, Dowager Duchess of Beaufort-Spontin.

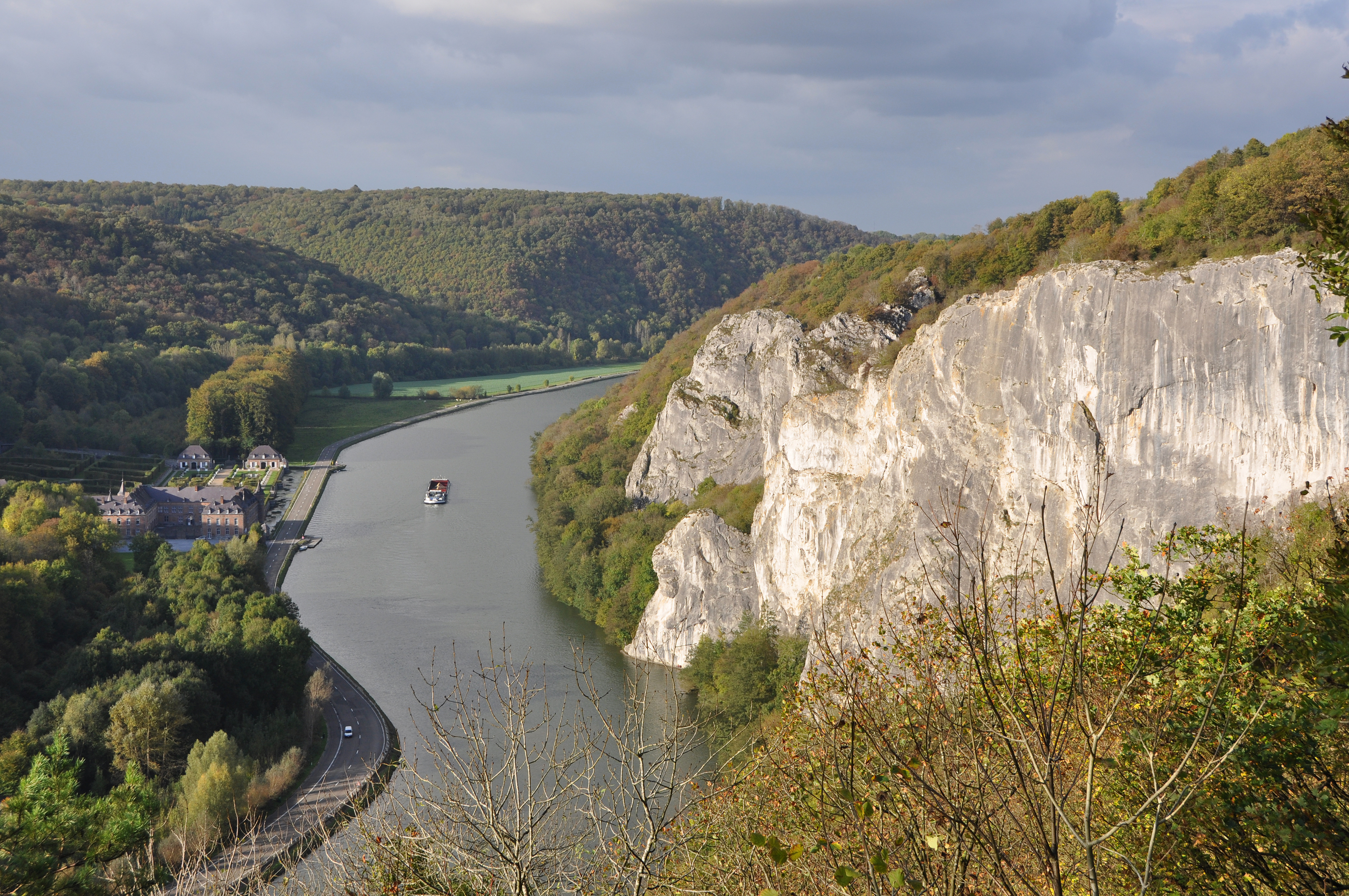
Site of the château and its gardens on the fertile river bottomland in front of the Rochers de Freyr with at the bottom the lionhead shaped rock

== The gardens ==
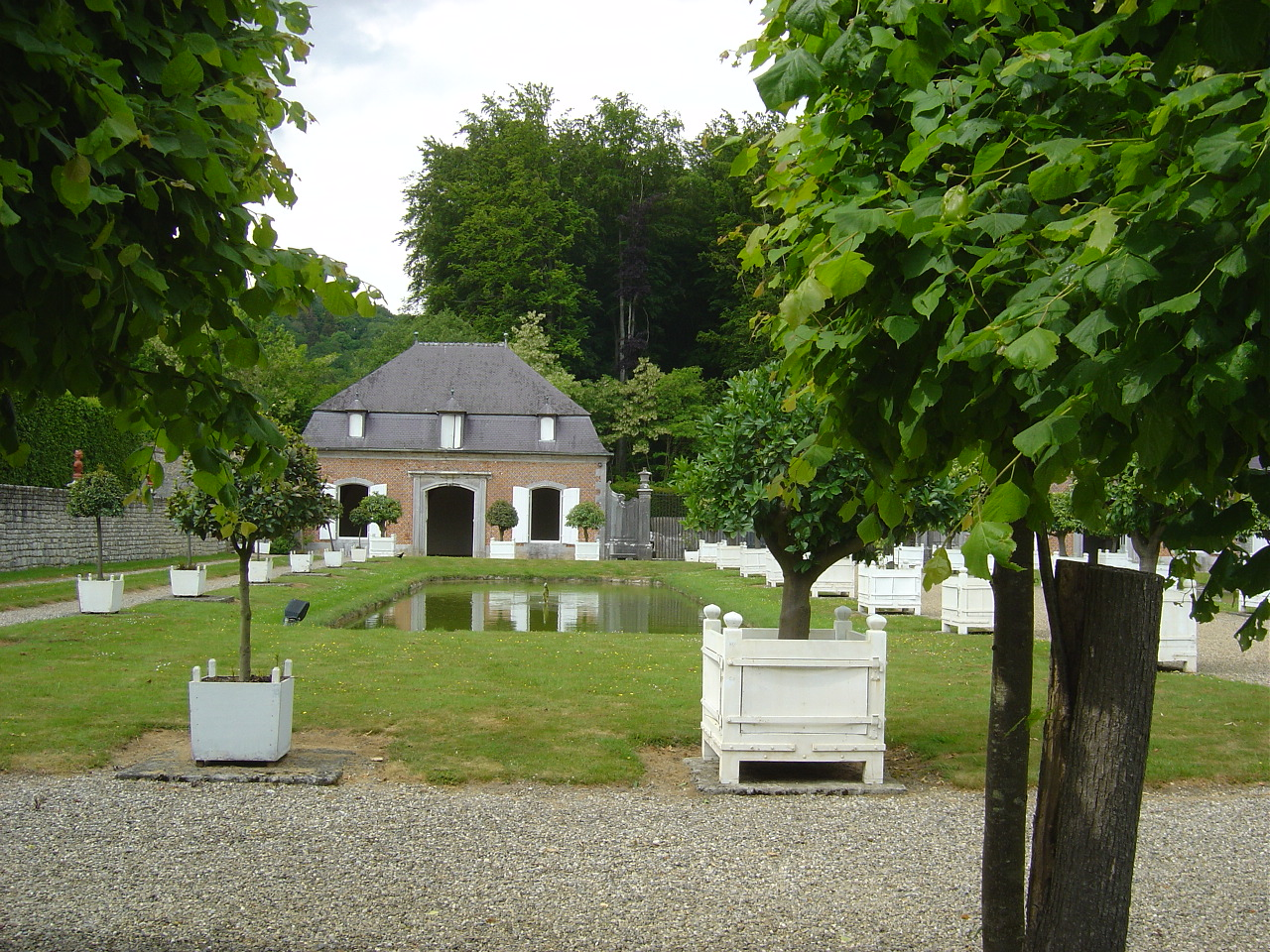
Orange garden

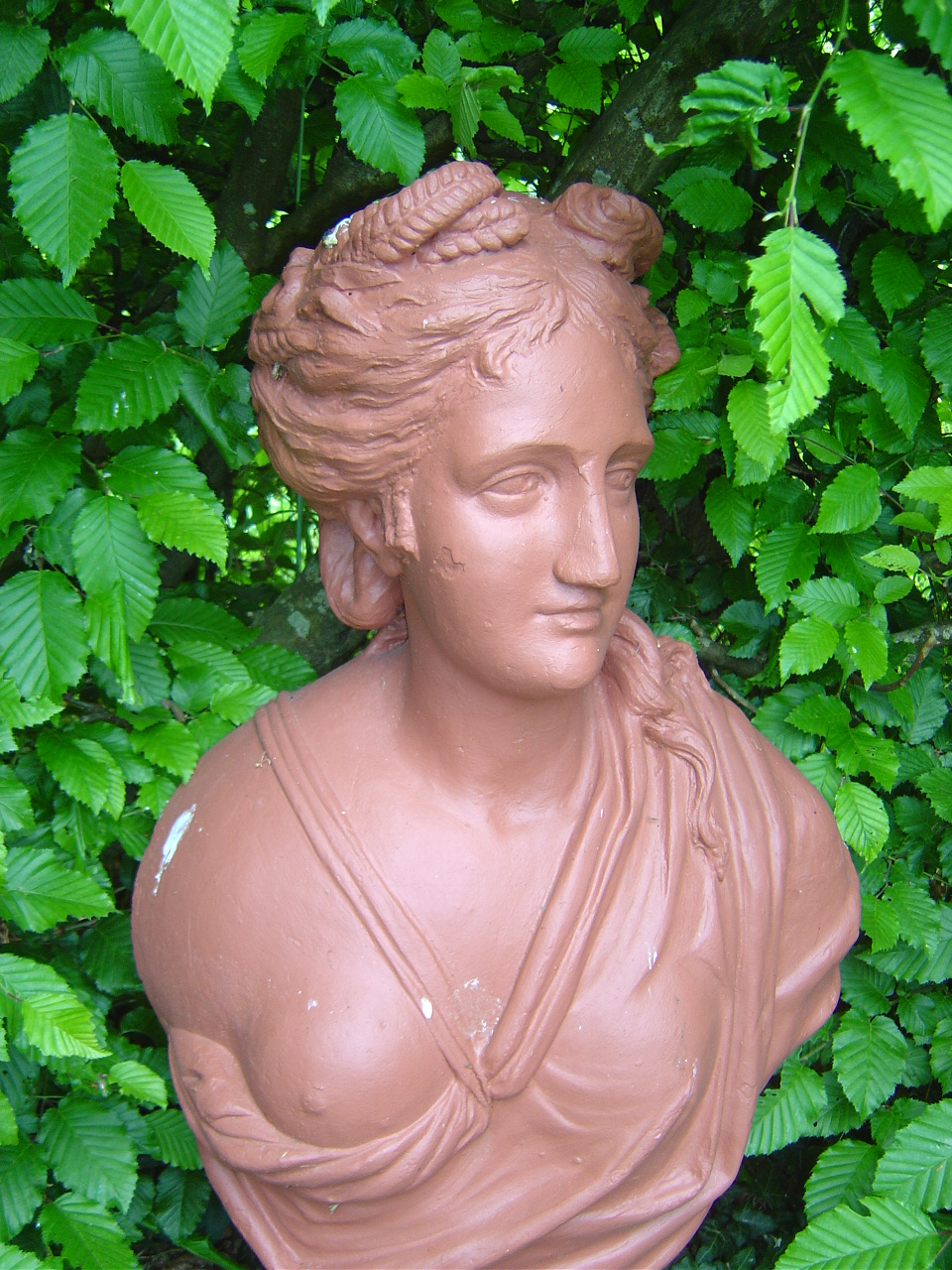
This terracotta fertility goddess reminds of Freya, twin-sister of Freyr.

Designed in the style of André Le Nôtre in 1760 by Canon Guillaume de Beaufort-Spontin and enlarged by his brother Philippe in 1770, the gardens are set on walled terraces on the left bank of the Meuse. They offer views towards the woods to the north and towards the Meuse to the east, and their peace and serenity contrast with the naked rockface on the far bank.

Ponds and fountains babble on the lower level where orange trees spread their delicate perfume. Most of them are 350 years old. The trees came to Freÿr in the first part of the 18th century from Lunéville, the residence of the Duke of Lorraine. They are the oldest trees in cases in Europe (Icomos Conference Orangerien in Europa – Von fürstlichem Vermögen und gärtnerischer Kunst, Bamberg 2005). The wooden cases are still built according to the original design. The oldest orangery of the Low Countries (early 18th century) combines elegance and simplicity.

The upper level is covered by hedge mazes (6 km) that unveil their mysteries one by one: a set of patterns inspired by card game figures, a theme also present in the terra cotta statues made by Cyfflé.

At the very top of the gardens, the Rococo pavilion commands the view on the Meuse and seduces by its delicate stucco decoration, based on the theme of fertility with cornucopia and Tritons.

The right bank of the Meuse is dominated by Rocks at Freyr more than 100 m high, 340 million years old), from which one has an exceptional view of the estate.

== Cooperation ==
- Marksburg, Germany
- Oron Castle, Switzerland
- Villa Rotonda, Italy
- Modave Castle, Belgium
- Ammersoyen Castle, Netherlands
- Château de la Roche Courbon, France
- Eggenberg Palace, Austria
- Nowy Wiśnicz Castle, Poland
- (Luxembourg) Vianden Castle, Luxemburg

== Gallery ==
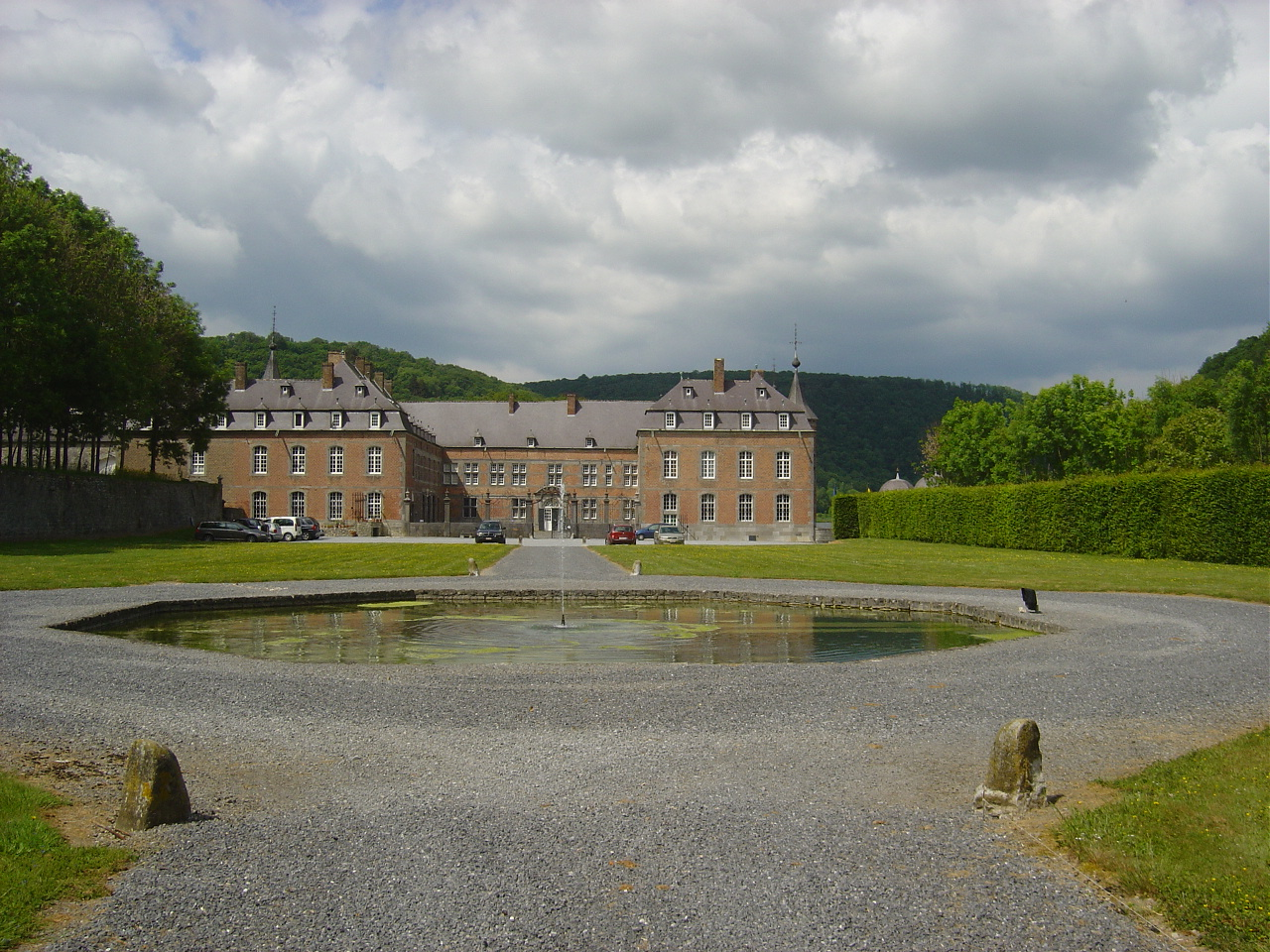
Façade of the castle

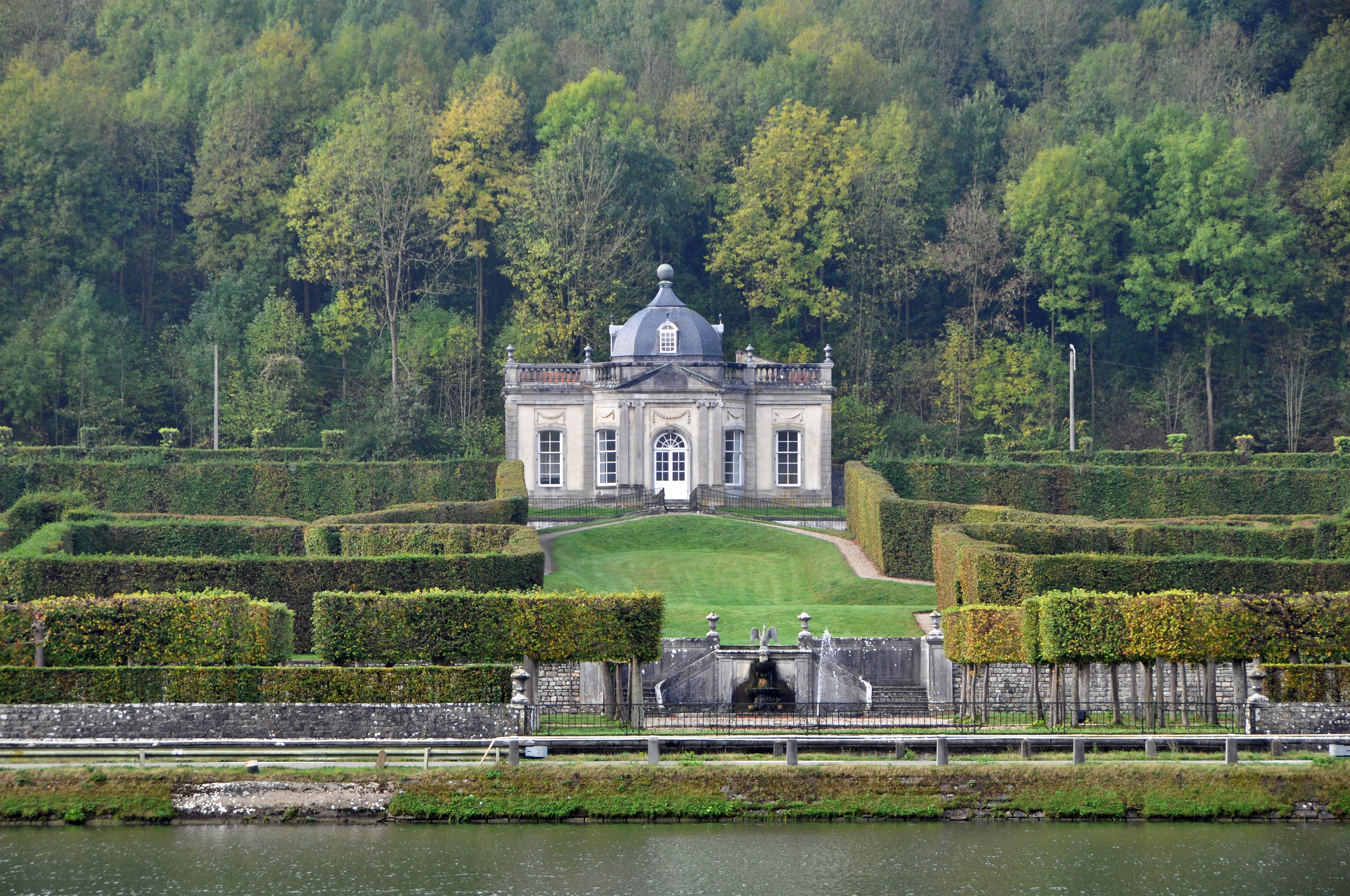
The Gardens, seen from the other side of the Meuse

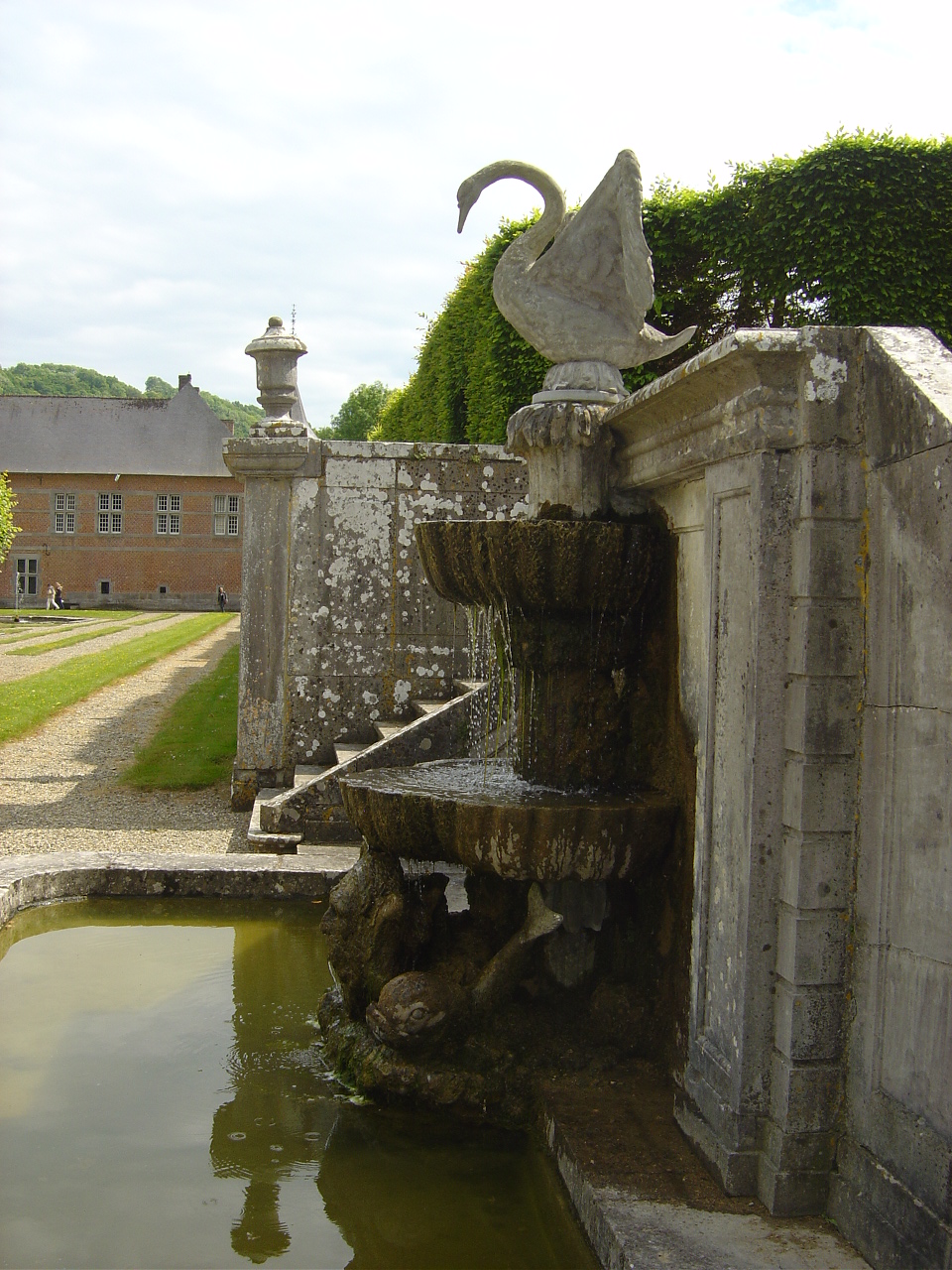
Fountain in the garden

== See also ==
- Freyr for the Nordic fertility god
- Freya the twin-sister of Frey(r)s
- List of castles in Belgium
- List of protected heritage sites in Hastière
