= Rocks at Freyr =

Rock mass in Belgium

Coordinates: 50°13′31″N 4°53′38″E

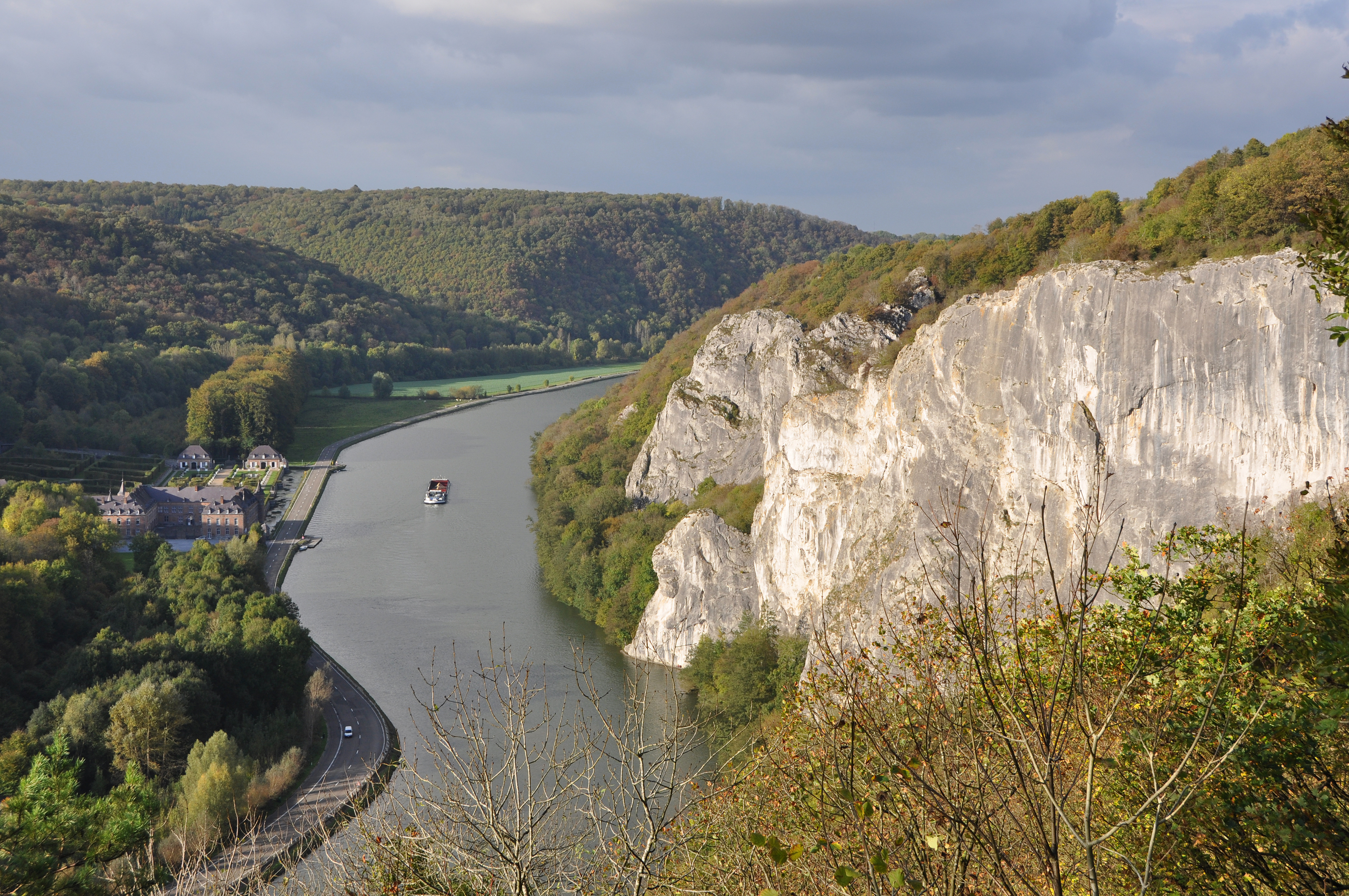
The rocks at Freÿr on the Meuse (with the castle of Freÿr on the other bank of the river)

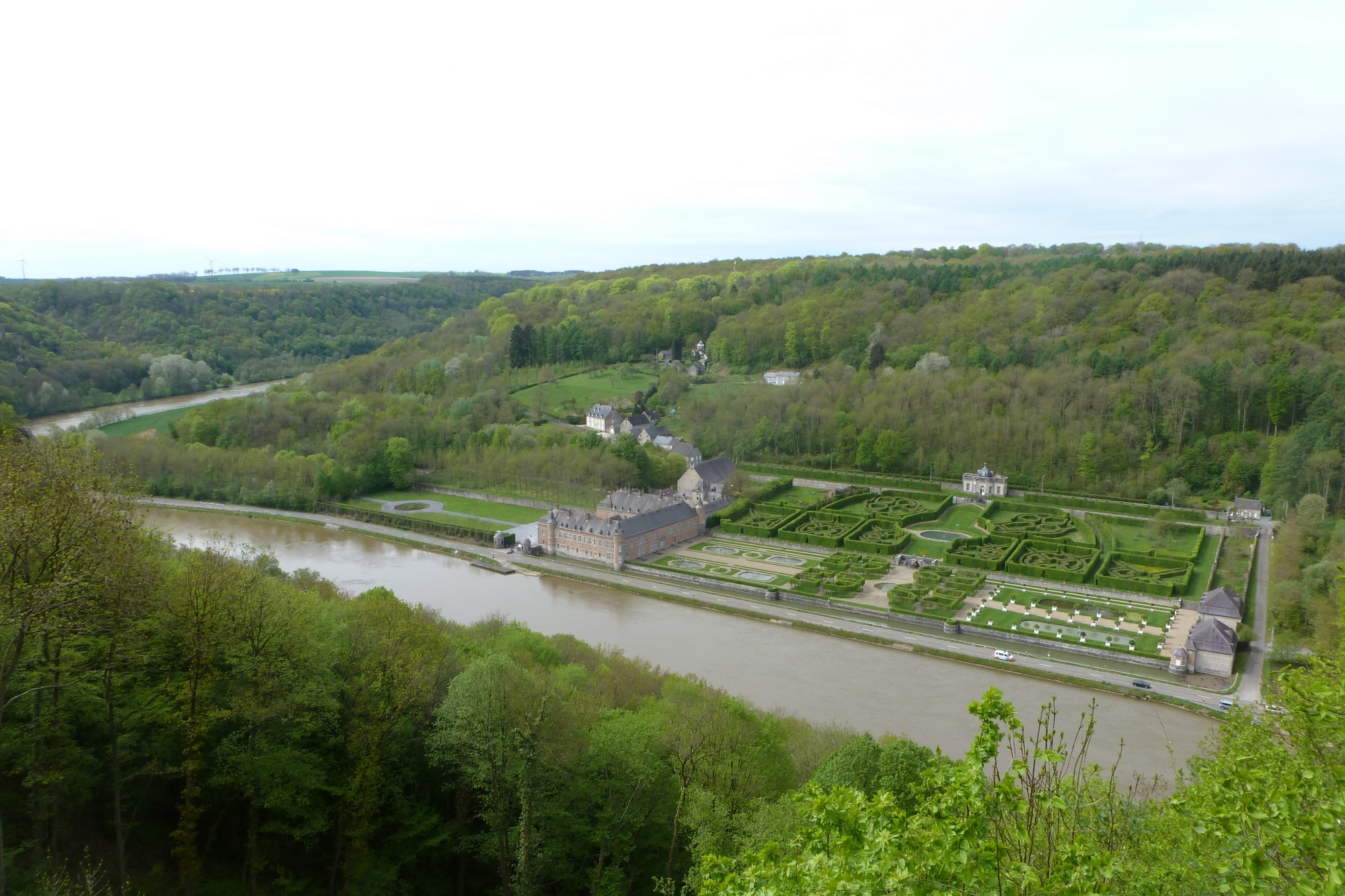
View on the Meuse valley north of the rocks at Freÿr

The Rocks at Freÿr form a large rock mass on the right bank of Meuse, between Waulsort and Anseremme in (Wallonia Belgium). Its walls of varying gradients and roughness make it a privileged climbing place in Belgium. The site is listed in the Wallonia's Major Heritage and the Natura 2000 network

== Location and access ==
- The Namur-Dinant road. After crossing Dinant, exit towards Beauraing. At Anseremme, you have two choices: either go up the N95 (direction of Beauraing) for about 4 km to the tableland of Freÿr, or after passing under the railway bridge, take the small street on the right (Av Amand de Mendieta), then go around the port of the Yacht Club of Anseremme and continue for one km to reach a path located between the Meuse and the rocks.
- For the general public, along the N95 there are two very impressive free panoramas, the first located to the north of the massif with a view of the castle, the gardens and the head of Mérinos rock, the second located at the South end of the massif next to the CAB hut, where 4 km of the Meuse valley unfold, starting from the meander of Waulsort, centered on that of Freÿr, to end on that of Moniat and overlooking the Al'Lègne rock.
- GR 126 (Bruxelles-Semois);
- IGN : 53/ 7–8.

The Castle of Freyr is located on the other bank of the Meuse.

== Study ==
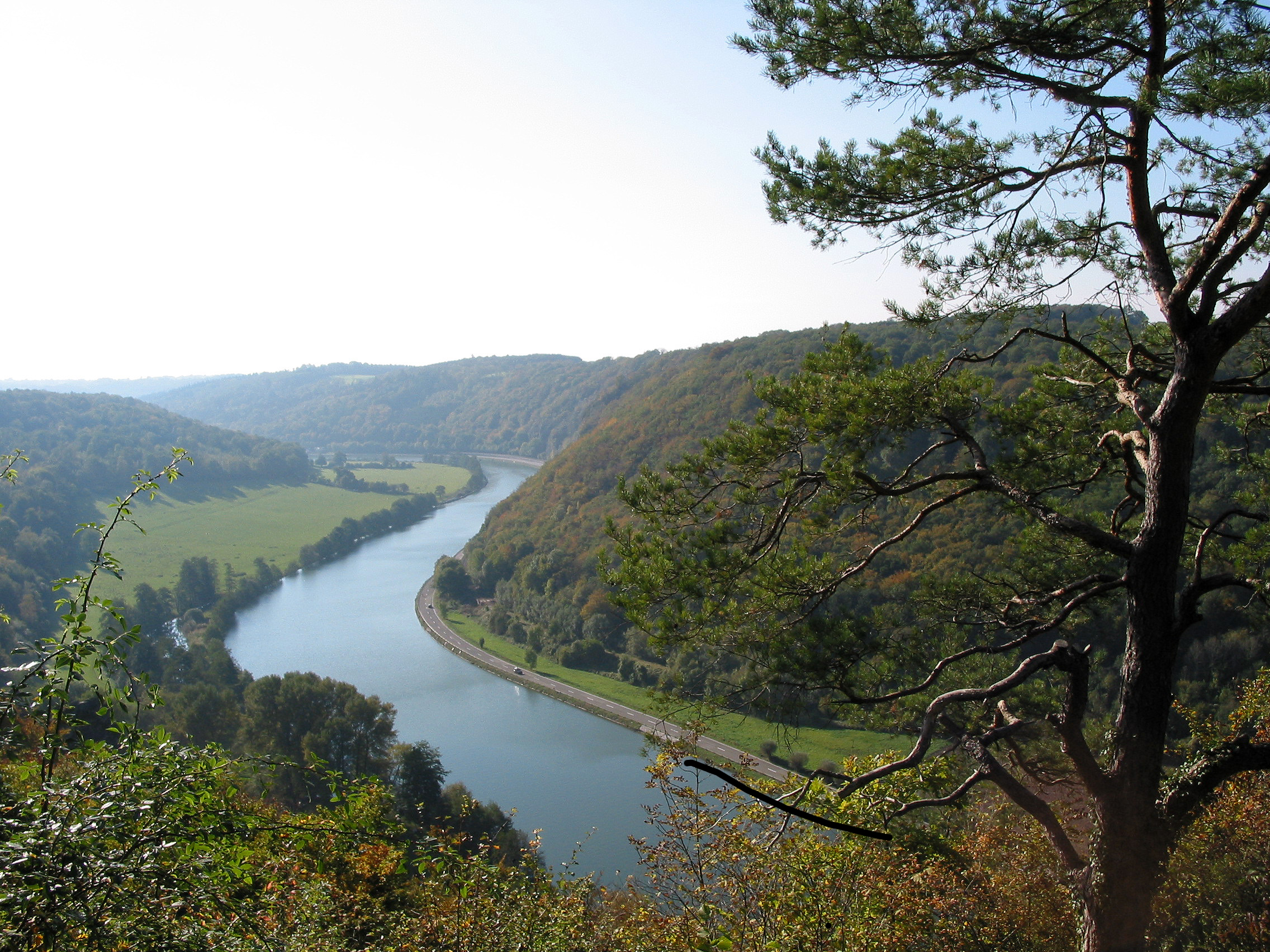
Panorama seen from the top of the Rocks at Freÿr

The King Baudouin Foundation through the Namur's ancient art Museum supported, in 2013, a major study on the site of Freÿr, both the right bank and the left bank in two volumes, totaling more than 1000 pages. It is called Freÿr sur Meuse, An exceptional heritage in the province of Namur . In particular, there are articles not only on the rocks, but also on the very special fauna and flora that one encounters there.
