= Wartet =

- Village of Namur
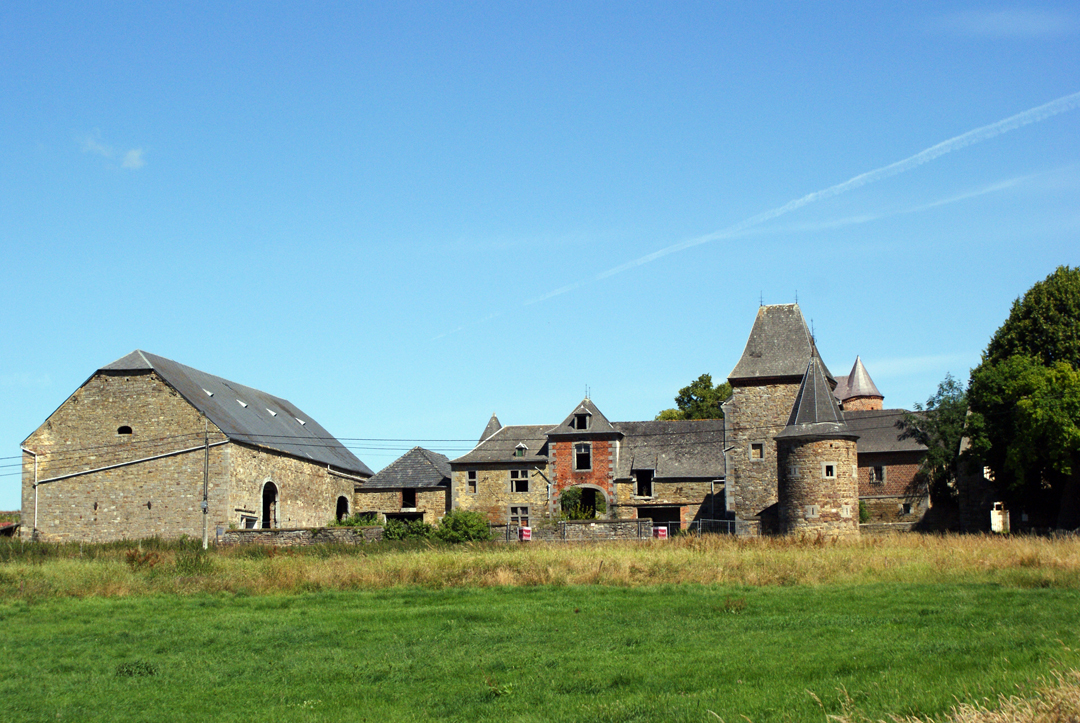
- Interactive map of Wartet
- Location within Belgium Location within Namur Province
- Coordinates: 50°29′41″N 4°58′30″E
- Country: Belgium
- Community: French Community
- Region: Wallonia
- Province: Namur
- Arrondissement: Namur
- Municipality: Namur
- Postal codes: 5024
- Area codes: 081

Wartet (French pronunciation: [waʁtɛ]) is a village of Wallonia and a part of the sub-municipality of Marche-les-Dames in the city of Namur, located in the province of Namur, Belgium.

Wartet is located on the heights near the Meuse while Marche-Les-Dames extends itself in a valley near a river stream La Gelbressée and the Meuse.

== History ==
The village has a classified castle-farm (Château-ferme de Wartet) located along a street known as Rue de Bayet.
