= Heers Castle =

Castle in Heers, Belgium

- Belgium
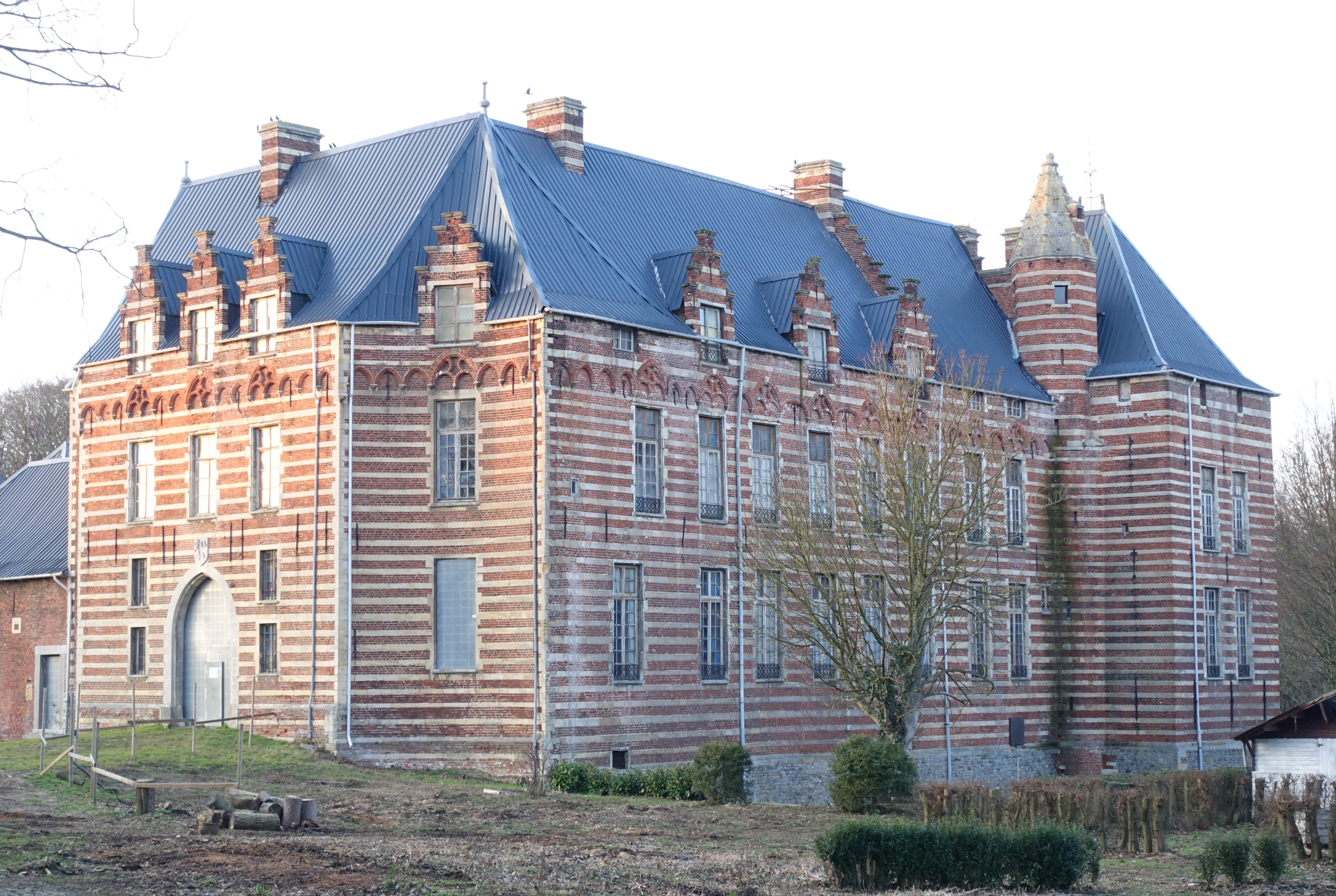
- Heers Castle.

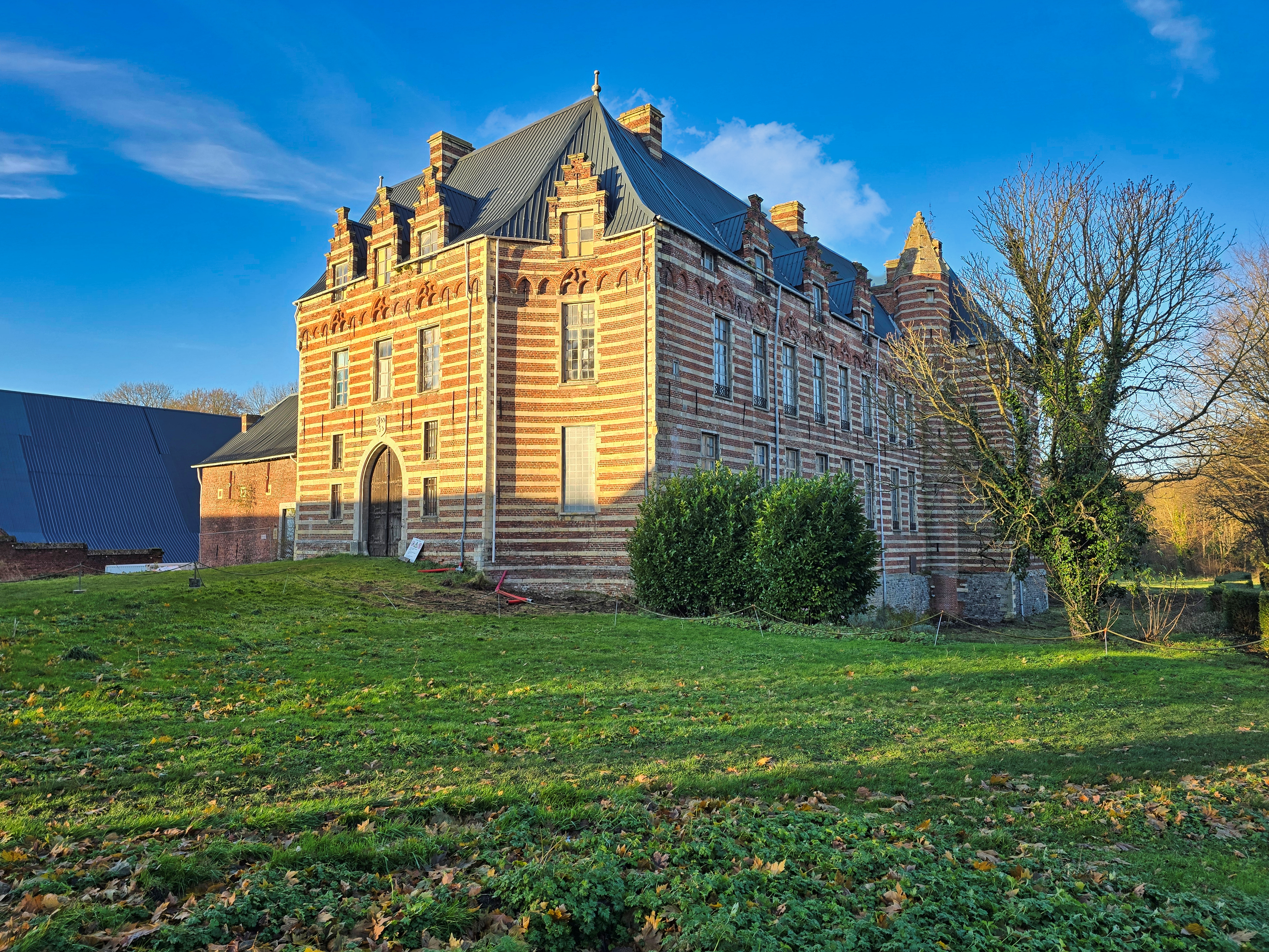
- The castle in 2024

Site information
- Type: Castle
- Condition: Derelict

Location
- Coordinates: 50°45′23.85″N 05°18′10.33″E

Site history
- Built: 13th Century

Heers Castle (Dutch: Kasteel van Heers) is a castle in Heers, Province of Limburg, Belgium.

It was built in the 13th century. Of its many owners, among the most notorious was Raes van Heers (1418–77), who was defeated and driven into exile by Charles the Bold at the Battle of Brustem in 1467. The castle, and the town of Heers, were laid waste by Charles's troops, although the castle was eventually repaired after Raes' death by his widow.

The family de Rivière d'Arschot lived here until the 18th century, when Barbara, daughter and heiress of the last Count, Henri de Rivière d'Arschot, became abbess of Herkenrode Abbey; on her death in 1744, the family became extinct.

In 2007, the Flemish government took over the castle to protect it, and later gave its management to Herita to restore it.

The castle has now (2010) again fallen into a derelict state.

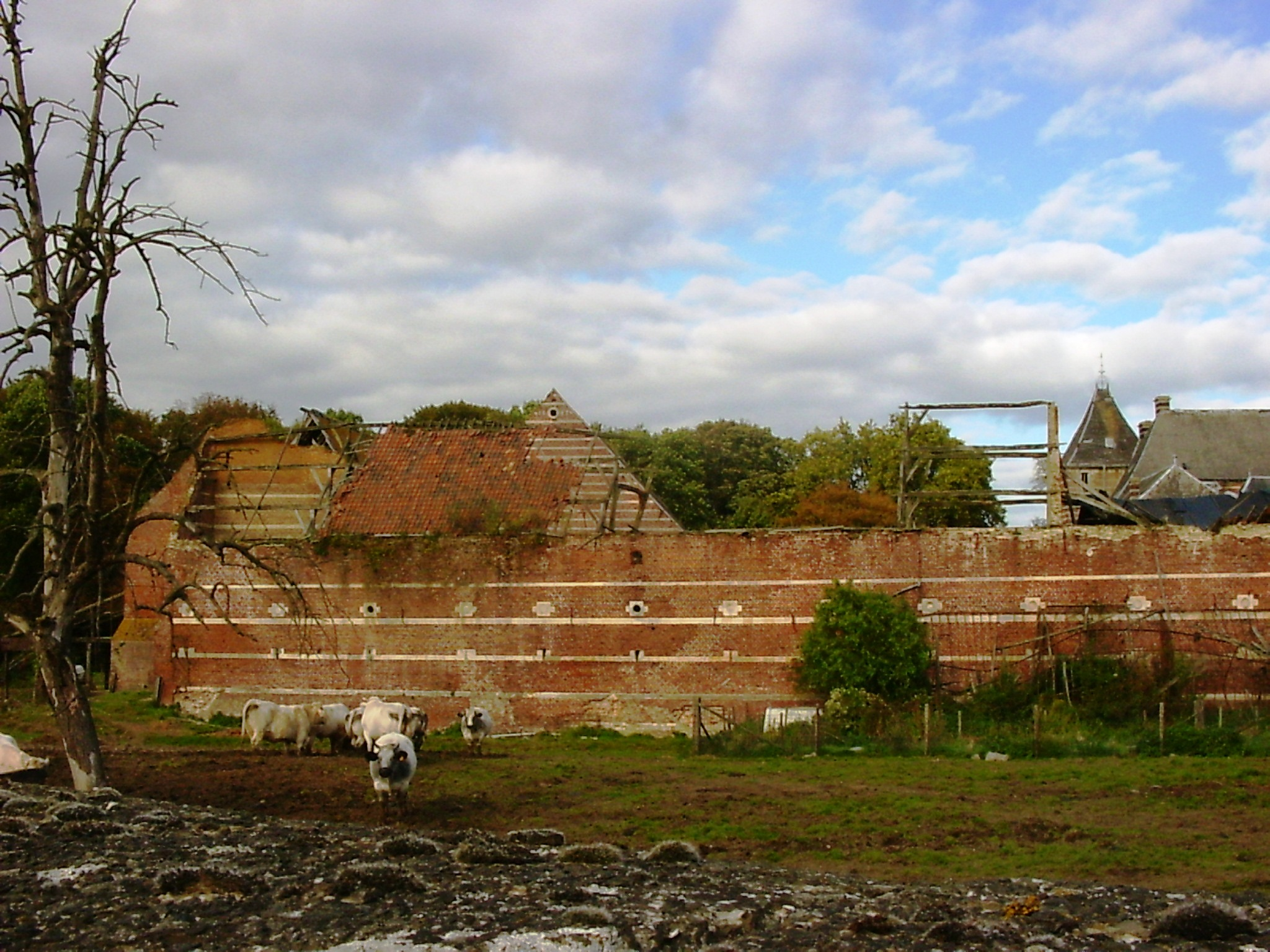
Castle farm in 2004, showing the disrepair

== See also ==
- List of castles in Belgium
