= Brasserie Caracole =

Belgian artisanal brewery near Dinant

Coordinates: 50°12′04.87″N 4°53′23.03″E

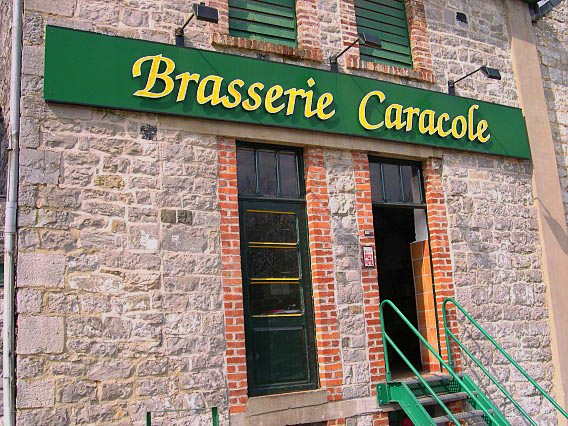
- Exterior of the Brasserie Caracole
- Location: Falmignoul, Belgium
- Opened: 1992
- Annual production volume: 1,400 hectolitres (1,200 US bbl)

Active beers
Name	Type
Caracole
Saxo
Saxo bio
Nostradamus
Troublette
Troublette bio

The Brasserie Caracole is a Belgian artisanal brewery based in Falmignoul (near Dinant) that is known to warm the water with a wood-fired oven. The bottling and labelling are done manually.

The brewery was already existing in 1766 under the name Brasserie Moussoux, then changed its name Brasserie Lamotte in 1941 and was finally taken over in 1992 to become the Brasserie Caracole.

== Beers ==
It produces 5 different beers:

- Caracole, a strong blond beer (8% ABV)
- Saxo, an amber beer (8% ABV)
- Nostradamus (9.5% ABV)
- Troublette (5% ABV)
- Troublette bio (5% ABV), an organic beer
