= Tinco Martinus Lycklama à Nijeholt =

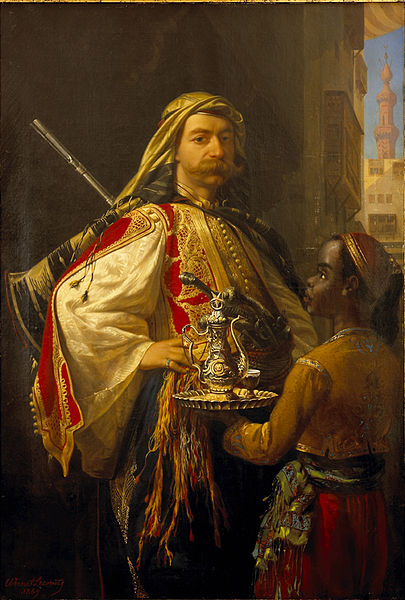
- by Emile Vernet-Lecomte - Collection : Musée de la Castre, Cannes
- Born: 9 July 1837; Beetsterzwaag, The Netherlands
- Died: 7 December 1900 (aged 63); Cannes, France
- Resting place: Wolvega, The Netherlands
- Other names: "Baron Lycklama"
- Occupations: Landowner, adventurer, writer
- Title: Jonkheer
- Spouse(s): Juliana Agatha Jacoba thoe Schwartzenberg en Hohenlansberg (Oosterhout, 11 June 1845 - Leeuwarden, 11 June 1914)
- Parent(s): Jan Anne Lycklama à Nijeholt (1809-1891) and Ypkjen Hillegonda van Eysinga (1815-1854)

Jhr. Tinco Martinus Lycklama à Nijeholt (9 July 1837, in Beetsterzwaag – 7 December 1900, in Cannes) was a Frisian aristocrat, adventurer, writer and socialite, also considered one of the first Dutch orientalists. At the age of 28, he took a three-year solitary voyage through the Russian Empire, the Caucasus and the Middle East. Shortly after his return to the Netherlands, he moved to Cannes.

The report of his travels totals over 2200 pages in four volumes. Tinco amassed an exceptional collection of oriental paintings and artifacts, which he donated to the city of Cannes in 1877. This collection is the centerpiece of the modern Musée de la Castre, the municipal museum of Cannes. Tinco Lycklama remained a citizen of Cannes until his death in 1900 and was a key personality in the fin de siècle French Riviera.

== Family background ==
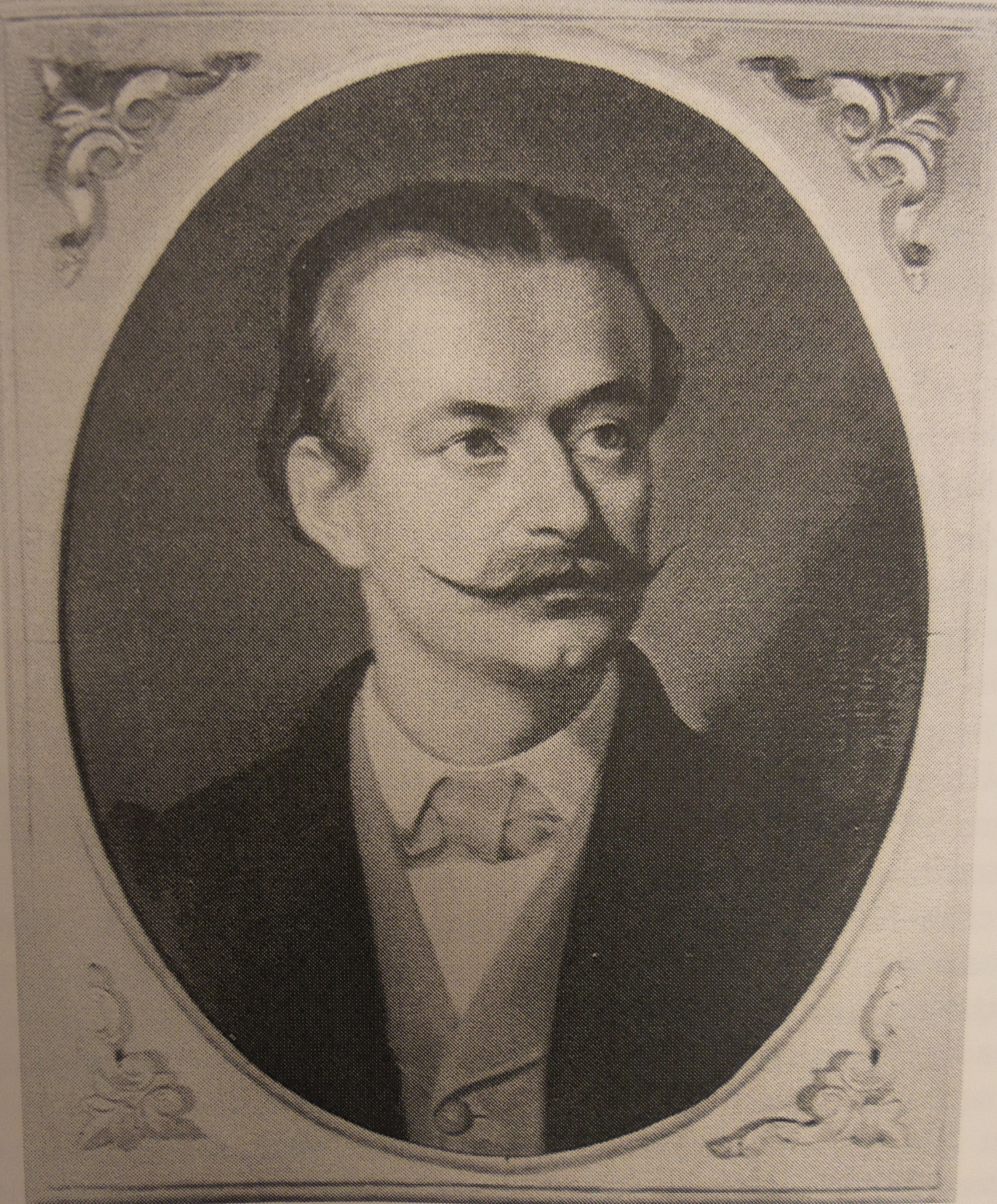
Tinco Lycklama, undated drawing (source: Annales de la Société scientifique et Littéraire de Cannes).

Tinco Lycklama was the oldest of the seven children of Jan Anne Lycklama à Nijeholt (1809-1891), esquire, mayor of Opsterland and a member of the States-Provincial of Frisia, and his wife Ypkjen Hillegonda van Eysinga (1815-1854). Tinco was named after his grandfather who was a grietman (mayor-judge) of Ooststellingwerf (1788-1790) and Utingeradeel (1790-1795).

Tinco's mother died when he was only 16. In his travel diaries, he wrote that she gave him a taste for foreign languages and cultures. Four brothers and sisters died young. His sister Eritia Ena Romelia Lycklama à Nijeholt (1845-1902) and his brother Augustinus Lycklama à Nijeholt (1842-1906) survived him.

Raised in the Dutch Reformed Church, he converted to the Catholic Church through the influence of his encounters in Ottoman Palestine. On 21 July 1875, in Oosterhout, he married the Catholic baroness Juliana Agatha Jacoba thoe Schwartzenberg en Hohenlansberg (Oosterhout, 11 June 1845 - Leeuwarden, 11 June 1914), a daughter of Gemme Onuphrius Tjalling Burmania, Baron thoe Schwartzenberg en Hohenlansberg (1806-1862) and of Hendrika de Hoogh (1803-1880). In Cannes, Tinco Lycklama, although only an esquire, went by the nickname of "Baron Lycklama". Tinco and his wife remained childless.

== Early years at Beetsterzwaag ==
Tinco grew up in a wealthy aristocratic family that owed its fortune to large land holdings, interests in the turf industry, smart marriages, and its position in Frisia's traditional elite. He spent his early years in the house where he was born at Beetsterzwaag (the "Lycklamahuis", situated on today's Hoofdstraat 80). His sister Eritia inherited this property in 1891, after the death of their father Jan Anne. When their mother died, in 1854, their property "Eysingahuis" (on the Hoofdstraat 46) – was co-owned by both the father and his children. Later, in 1868, Tinco became its sole proprietor. From September 1856, Tinco studied law at the University of Groningen. After 1861, he moved to Paris where he was enrolled at the École des langues orientales.

== Discovering the Middle East ==
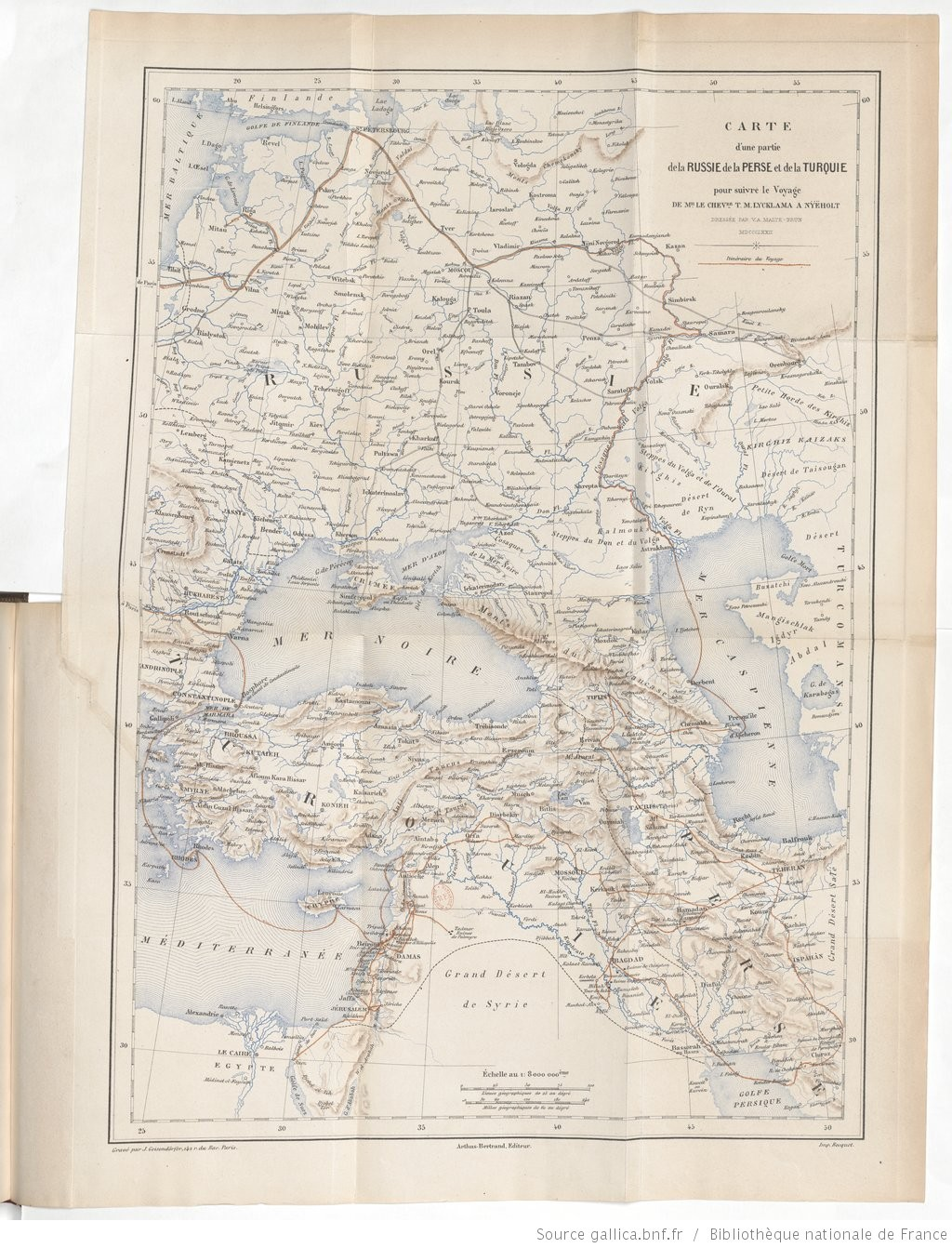
Travel itinerary of Tinco Lycklama in 1865-1868 (source: "Voyage...", collection BNF/Gallica

In Paris, Tinco Lycklama conceived plans for a voyage of discovery and exploration through the Middle East. His main interests are Persia and Syria. In his opinion, most of his contemporaries seemed more interested in Asia and the Americas, whereas he had a passion for Mesopotamia and the Levant. His ambition was not to re-write the region's history, but rather to observe and to share the contemporary situation of this little-known part of the world, and to do so from a variety of angles (including tourism). But he would do more than that. Along the way, he bought all sorts of artifacts and conducted various archaeological digs. He took home a significant collection of objects that established his reputation as one of the first Dutch orientalists. His finds and observations in Persia in particular contributed significantly to our modern knowledge of the Qajar dynasty, which ruled Persia from 1789 to 1925.

Tinco left Paris in April 1865. He travelled via Berlin and Russia to Tehran through the Caucasus. It was an unusual itinerary, as most travelers in those days preferred to take a more direct route via the Mediterranean and Turkey. Tinco's choice stems from his reading of the stories of French merchant-traveler Jean-Baptiste Tavernier (1605-1689). In April 1866, he arrived in Teheran where he spent six months. Next, he crisscrossed the region and visited Baghdad and other cities in modern Iraq. In September 1867, he left for Syria, where he spent eight months traveling the whole country. Then he took two months to discover Palestine and Jerusalem, before returning to Syria. In September 1868, he left the Middle East and travelled back to the Netherlands via Constantinople, Varna, Pest, and Vienna. He finally arrived home, at Beetsterzwaag, on 5 October 1868.

== A remarkable collection, a captivating travel story ==
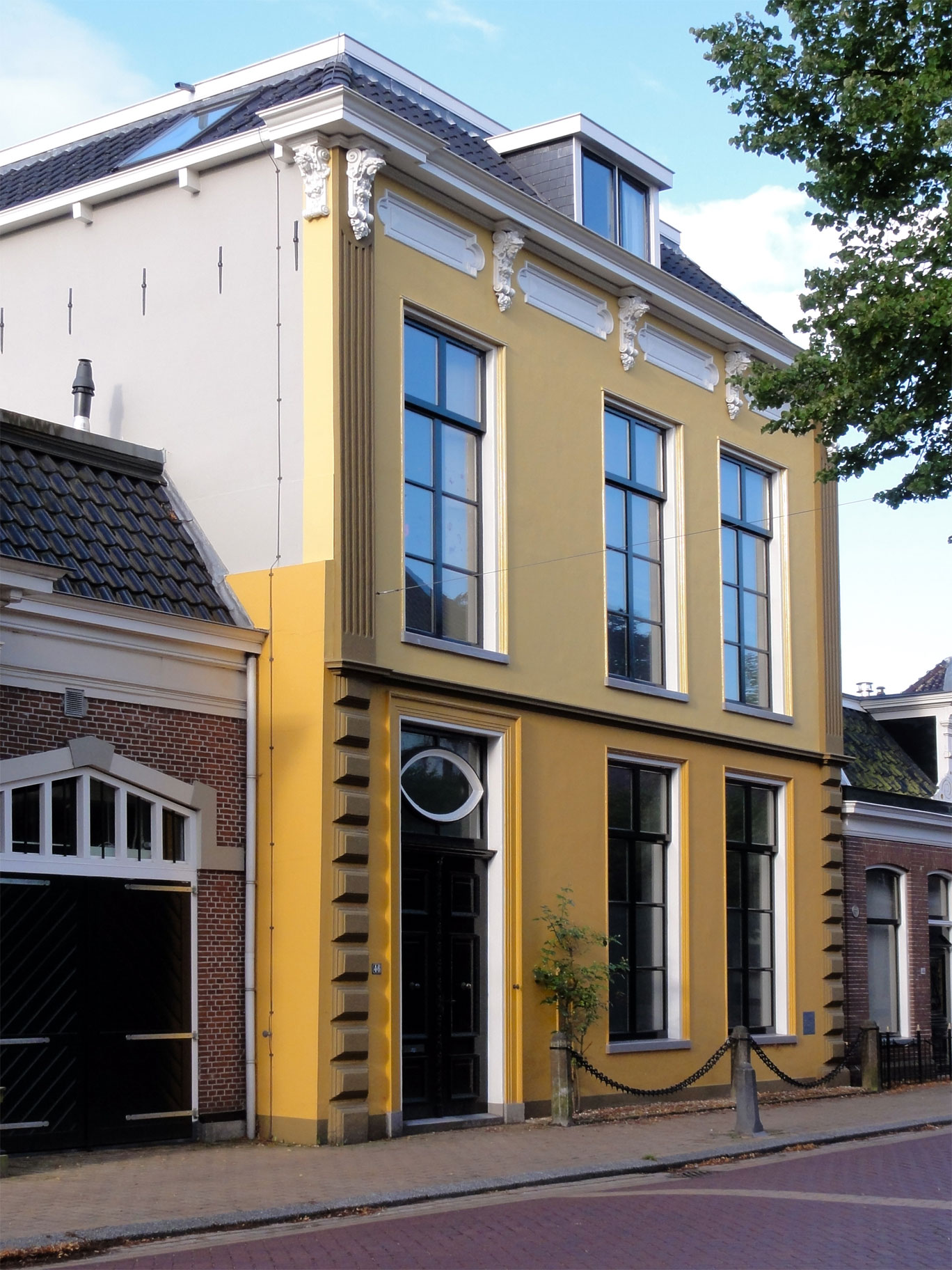
Eysingahuis, Hoofdstraat 46 at Beetsterzwaag (The Netherlands). Tinco's home between 1868 and 1872 housed the first 'Lycklama Museum'.

Tinco Lycklama moves into the Eysingahuis of which he had become the sole proprietor in 1868. He transforms the house to accommodate not only himself and his staff but also the collection of objects he brought back from his travels. In fact, a substantial part of the house becomes a genuine museum. As many objects had stayed behind in the Middle East but had started to arrive in Beetsterzwaag, the museum was expanding by the week. In 1870, he recruited a private secretary, the Frenchman Ernest Massenot, whose mission consisted of building a descriptive inventory of the collection. By the end of 1871, they published a first (incomplete) catalogue.

This highly eclectic collection comprised oriental jewelry and paintings as well as clothing and archaeological finds. At the time, the significance of the collection was not immediately understood, but this changed with the growing international attention for this collection. One of the major factors that contributed to Tinco's reputation was the publication of his travel diaries. He started editing these diaries in Cannes, where he went to recover from illness related to his travels. Whereas Cannes had only been a big village of 4,000 inhabitants in 1840, it had grown into one of the favorite winter destinations of the elites of northern Europe, particularly under the influence of Lord Brougham, an English aristocrat and Lord Chancellor of Great Britain. Tinco not only loved the mild climate in Cannes: he also found an international community that was keen on his colourful travel stories. For a while, Tinco kept traveling between Beetsterzwaag and Cannes, while managing his collection and preparing the publication of his diaries. The end result is an opus of over 2,200 pages (in four volumes), rich in observations on culture, politics, arts, tourism, and people. Between 1872 and 1875, a new volume was published every year through his editors in Paris and Amsterdam. During that time, Tinco decided to leave Beetsterzwaag for good. Owing to his inheritance and investments, he can live a life in luxury. He moved permanently to Cannes.

== "Baron Lycklama" ==
His move to Cannes occurred shortly before the publication of the first volume of his travel stories, towards the end of 1872. This also spelled the end of the first Lycklama Museum in Beetsterzwaag, as the collection moved with him. Tinco took up quarters in the luxurious Villa Escarras, situated on today's boulevard Carnot near the rue Lord Byron. At that time, Cannes was still a charming little town but expanding with a growing number of pretty villas, mostly west of the Mont-Chevalier. It was still early days for the famous Croisette. The construction of a railroad connecting Paris to the Mediterranean coast, and the opening of a station in Cannes in 1863, profoundly changed the landscape of the town. Tinco's villa had a large park, surrounded by open land and sparse luxurious villas. Soon, the villa is renamed "Villa Lycklama". In 1875, at Oosterhout (Netherlands), Tinco married Juliana Agatha Jacoba thoe Schwartzenberg en Hohenlansberg, who moved with him to Cannes. Rapidly they became welcome guests and hosts for the upper classes, who included rich bourgeois and aristocrats from Paris, England, Russia, Prussia... Tinco's "bals masqués" were major events. One of them was portrayed by Tinco's friend, the artist Pierre Tetar van Elven, and Tinco enjoyed portraits of himself in oriental garb. The commercial developments around the future boulevard Carnot encouraged the Lycklama to sell their property and move into a new "Villa Lycklama" in today's rue Lycklama. They also acquired other properties nearby, giving them names such as Burmania and Eritia - popular first names in the Lycklama family.

== Lycklama collection becomes the municipal museum of Cannes ==
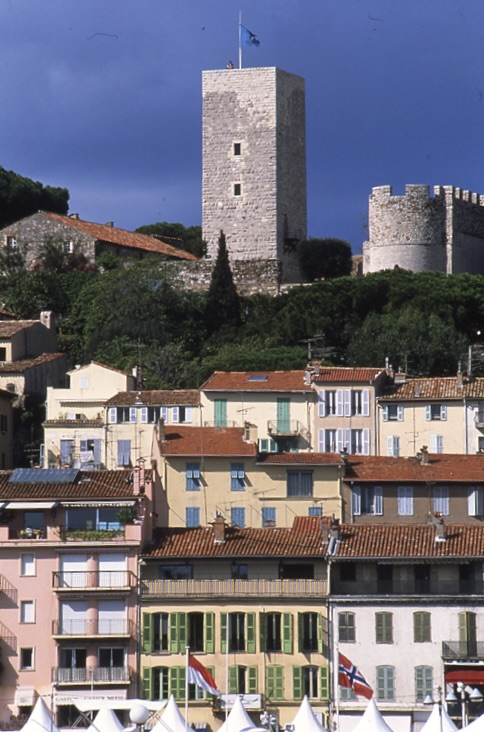
Musée de la Castre, Cannes

In 1872, Tinco Lycklama joined the Société des Sciences naturelles, des Lettres et Beaux-Arts. Established in 1868, the society continues today as the "Société Scientifique et Littéraire de Cannes"). This historical society has included various well-known members, such as the writer Guy de Maupassant, the Nobel Prize winner Frédéric Mistral, and Pedro II, the emperor of Brazil. Appreciated for his knowledge, his experience and his collection, Tinco Lycklama became one of its major benefactors. Towards the end of 1877, Tinco Lycklama donated his collection to the city of Cannes. A few months later, the Société des Sciences naturelles contributed its library. Together, these two donations are housed in the new town hall (where there is a "Salle Lycklama" to this day). These collections became the cornerstone of the modern Musée de la Castre, the municipal museum of Cannes located on the Mont-Chevalier (better known as the "Suquet", appreciated for its winding streets with restaurants and bars). The Lycklama collection remains a central component of the museum and is essential for our knowledge about the Qajar dynasty. It still honours Tinco Lycklama as a pioneer in this field of expertise. Part of the collection is placed as a permanent loan to the Rijksmuseum van Oudheden in Leiden.

== Death of Tinco ==
Tinco Martinus Lycklama à Nijeholt and Baroness thoe Schwartzenberg belong among those who shaped Cannes in the latter part of the 19th century. However, they maintained strong connections to the Netherlands, where they kept very substantial possessions. In various places in both France and the Netherlands they are remembered for their generosity, in particular for their substantial donations to Catholic charities. Tinco maintained close personal ties with the St. Francis parish at Wolvega, where he built a chapel which became his (and his wife's) last resting place.

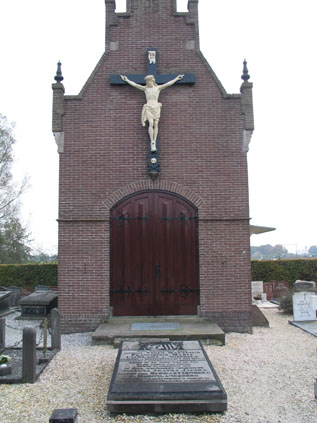
The Lycklama chapel at Wolvega (Frisia)

Tinco Lycklama died in Cannes on 7 December 1900. The town invited all dignitaries and the consular corps to an official ceremony on 11 December. The procession left the Villa Lycklama for the "Notre-Dame-de-Bon-Voyage" church, where mayor Jean Hibert pronounced an elegy for his close friend. The coffin was then transported to the railway station, whence it left the same evening for Wolvega as its final destination. Cannes lost a remarkable citizen who left his mark on the city. His widow kept her residence in Cannes until 1911. She died at Leeuwarden in 1914, and was inhumed at the chapel at Wolvega.
