= Couque de Dinant =

Very hard biscuit from the Belgian city of Dinant

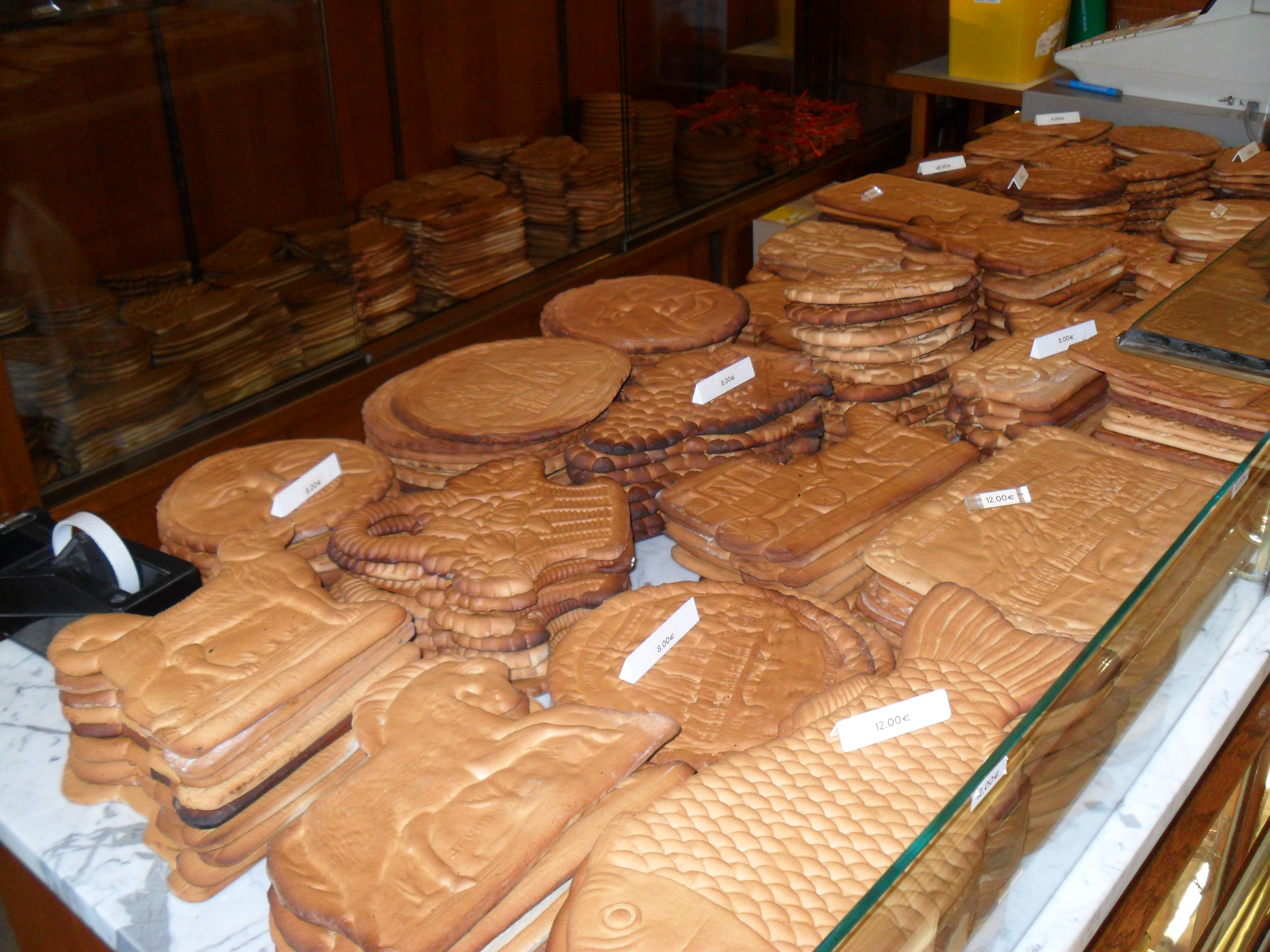
Couques de Dinant at a Dinant bakery

The Couque de Dinant (English: Cake of Dinant) is an extremely hard, sweet biscuit native to the southern Belgian city of Dinant in Wallonia.

== Preparation ==
Couques are made with only two ingredients: wheat flour and honey, in equal amounts by weight, and nothing else at all: not even water or yeast. The dough is put in a wooden mould made from wood from the pear tree, walnut tree or beech tree. The moulds have a wide variety of shapes, which include animals, floral motifs, people or landscapes.

The biscuit is cooked in an oven preheated to around 300 °C (575 °F) for 15 minutes, allowing the honey to caramelize. On cooling, the biscuit becomes very hard, and can be preserved indefinitely. Due to this property, couques can be displayed as decoration, used as Christmas tree ornaments, or used to commemorate special occasions.

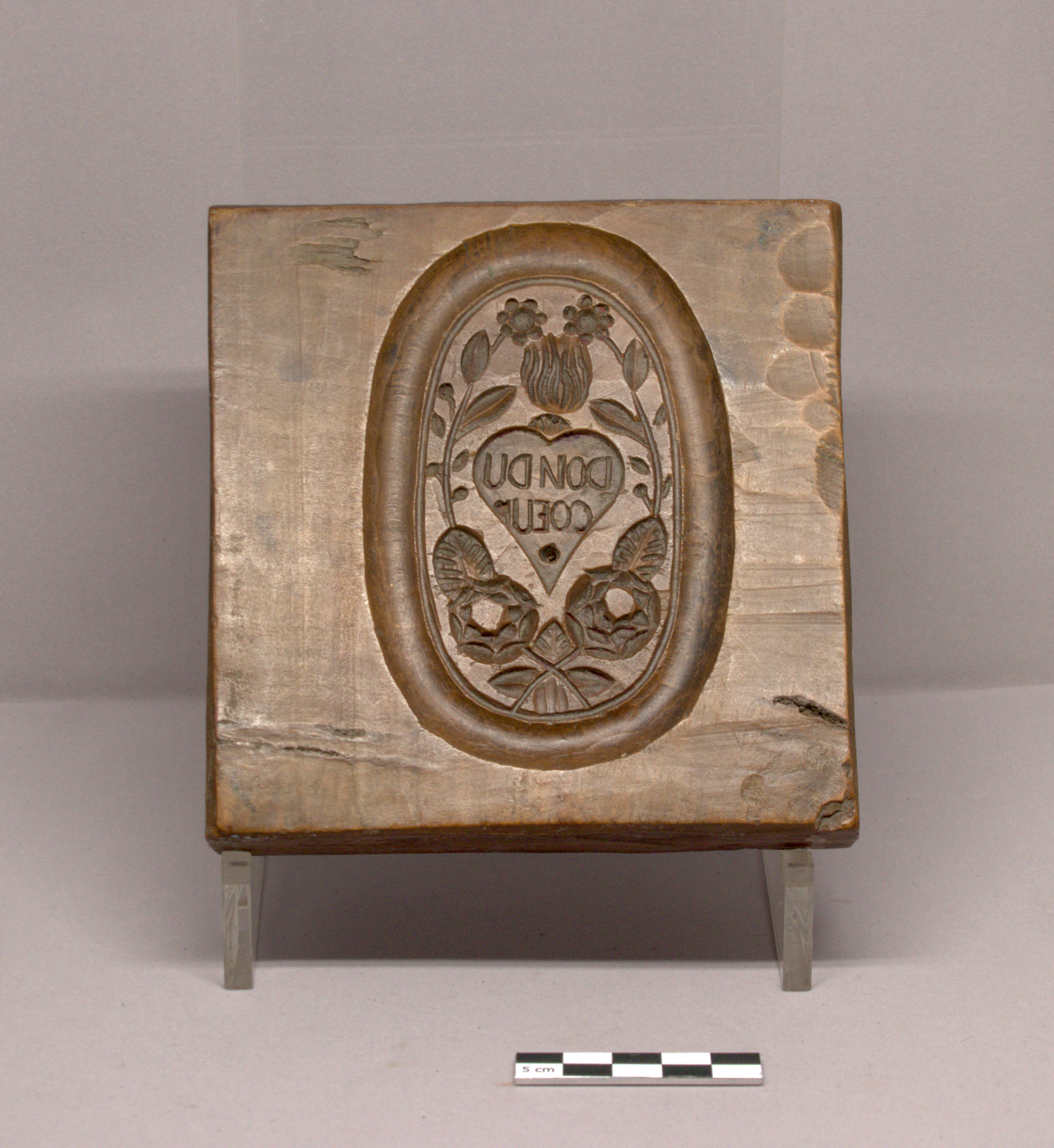
Traditional wooden couques de Dinant mould.

A variant, the couque de Rins also adds sugar to the dough. It is sweeter and softer as a result.

== Consumption ==
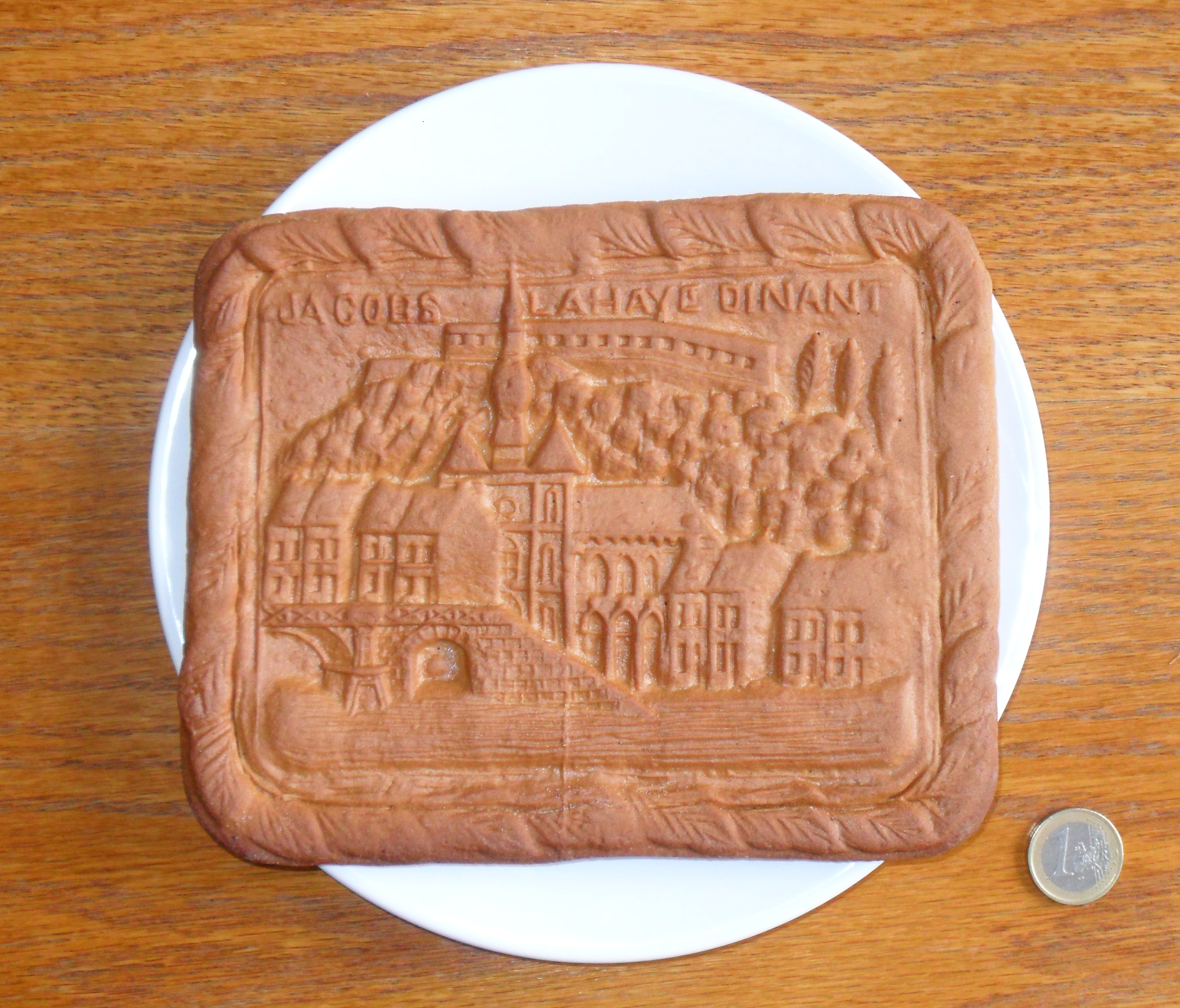
Couques de Dinant are fairly large. Here a smallish one is shown with a 1 euro coin for scale. The design is a view of Dinant.

Due to their extreme hardness and fairly large size, couques de Dinant are not intended to be bitten into directly. They are instead broken into fragments and can then be bitten, sucked, left to melt in the mouth or be soaked in coffee. Couques de Dinant have been traditionally given to babies during teething.

While Dinant bakeries see large sales over the summer season due to tourists, consumption of couques is highest near Saint Nicholas Day in December. At that time of year, they are sold and eaten all over Belgium.

== Origins ==
A popular though unlikely legend holds that the couques arose from the sacking of Dinant in 1466 by Charles the Bold in the Liège Wars. The citizens were supposedly desperate and had little to eat but flour and honey, so they conceived of making a dough out of the two mixed together. As the dough was so firm, they had the idea of printing it in the negative in dinanderie (local ornate brasswork), and thereby began the tradition of giving them patterns.

Much more certain is that the couque began to appear some time in the 18th century, though the exact circumstances of its invention are unclear.

== See also ==
- Belgian cuisine
- List of crackers
