= Dinant =

City and municipality in Namur Province, Wallonia, Belgium

- Municipality
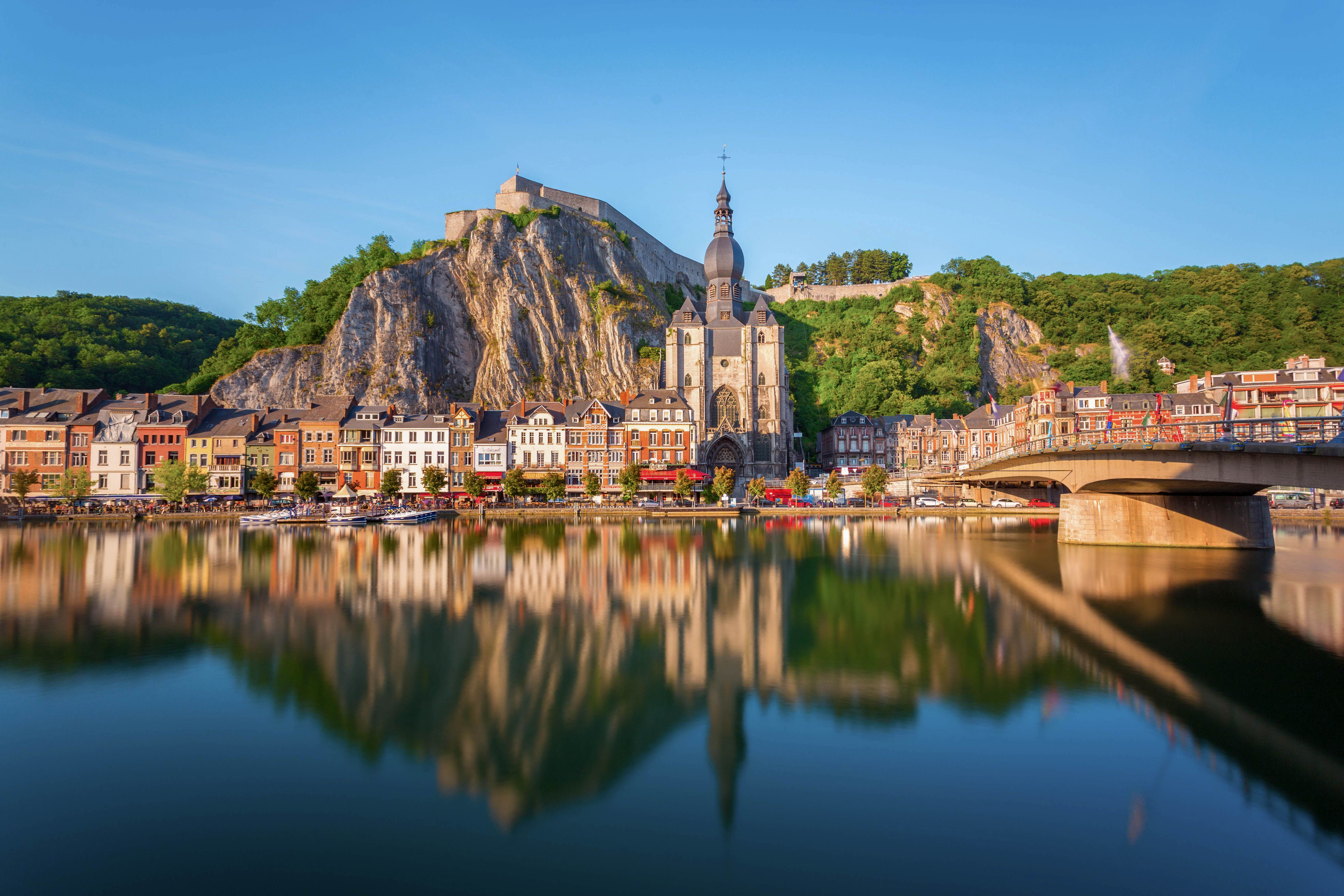
- The citadel, the collegiate church and the Meuse

- Flag Coat of arms

- Location of Dinant in Namur
- Interactive map of Dinant
- Location in Belgium
- Coordinates: 50°16′N 04°55′E
- Country: Belgium
- Community: French Community
- Region: Wallonia
- Province: Namur
- Arrondissement: Dinant

Government
  - Mayor: Thierry Bodlet (MR, ID!)
  - Governing party: ID! - Dinant - Dinant Autrement

Area
  - Total: 100.05 km^{2} (38.63 sq mi)

Population (2018-01-01)
  - Total: 13,544
  - Density: 135.37/km^{2} (350.61/sq mi)
- Postal codes: 5500, 5501, 5502, 5503, 5504
- NIS code: 91034
- Area codes: 082
- Website: www.dinant.be

Dinant (French pronunciation: [dinɑ̃]) is a city and municipality of Wallonia located in the province of Namur, Belgium. On the shores of river Meuse, in the Ardennes, it lies 90 kilometres (56 mi) south-east of Brussels, 30 kilometres (19 mi) south-east of Charleroi and 30 kilometres (19 mi) south of the city of Namur. Dinant is situated 20 kilometres (12 mi) north of the border with France.

The municipality consists of the following districts: Anseremme, Bouvignes-sur-Meuse, Dinant, Dréhance, Falmagne, Falmignoul, Foy-Notre-Dame, Furfooz, Lisogne, Sorinnes and Thynes.

== Geography ==
Dinant is positioned in the Upper Meuse valley, at a point where the river cuts deeply into the western Condroz plateau. Sited in a steep-sided valley, between the rock face and the river, the original settlement had little space in which to grow away from the river, and it therefore expanded into a long, thin town, on a north–south axis, along the river shore. During the 19th century, the former Île des Batteurs (Drummers' Island) to the south was attached directly to the town when a branch of the Meuse was filled in.

Dinant has been enriched by the agricultural opportunities presented by the fertile land on the plateau that overlooks it. Within the town, brassware production is a traditional craft that has benefited from the presence of the broad and, at this point, easily navigable river which has facilitated easy delivery of the raw materials and ready distribution of the resulting products of the artisans' workshops. Another traditional source of wealth is provided by the limestone cliffs overlooking the town, which supported a high-end quarrying industry, producing black marble and bluestone, and whose distribution also benefited from the proximity of the relatively wide and deep navigable river.

=== Climate ===
Climate data for Dinant (1991−2020 normals)
Month	Jan	Feb	Mar	Apr	May	Jun	Jul	Aug	Sep	Oct	Nov	Dec	Year
Mean daily maximum °C (°F)	5.5 (41.9)	6.6 (43.9)	10.6 (51.1)	14.7 (58.5)	18.3 (64.9)	21.3 (70.3)	23.4 (74.1)	23.2 (73.8)	19.4 (66.9)	14.6 (58.3)	9.3 (48.7)	5.9 (42.6)	14.4 (57.9)
Daily mean °C (°F)	2.5 (36.5)	2.9 (37.2)	5.8 (42.4)	8.8 (47.8)	12.6 (54.7)	15.7 (60.3)	17.8 (64.0)	17.4 (63.3)	13.9 (57.0)	10.2 (50.4)	6.0 (42.8)	3.2 (37.8)	9.8 (49.6)
Mean daily minimum °C (°F)	−0.5 (31.1)	−0.8 (30.6)	1.0 (33.8)	3.0 (37.4)	6.9 (44.4)	10.2 (50.4)	12.2 (54.0)	11.7 (53.1)	8.5 (47.3)	5.9 (42.6)	2.6 (36.7)	0.4 (32.7)	5.1 (41.2)
Average precipitation mm (inches)	78.6 (3.09)	70.3 (2.77)	65.2 (2.57)	50.6 (1.99)	69.7 (2.74)	70.5 (2.78)	76.3 (3.00)	82.3 (3.24)	61.6 (2.43)	69.8 (2.75)	72.4 (2.85)	94.0 (3.70)	861.3 (33.91)
Average precipitation days (≥ 1.0 mm)	13.3	12.2	11.7	9.5	10.8	10.7	10.4	10.8	9.4	11.2	12.6	14.6	137.2
Mean monthly sunshine hours	55	72	127	178	202	209	216	206	159	111	61	45	1,642
Source: Royal Meteorological Institute

== History ==
=== Origins to the 10th century ===
The name Dinant comes from the Celtic Divo-Nanto, meaning "Sacred Valley" or "Divine Valley"; it can also be translated as "Celestial Gorge" or "Luminous Gorge" (as in modern Welsh Nant Dwyfol).

The remains of a prehistoric woman, known as the 'Margaux Woman', were found near Dinant in 1988. She is estimated to have been buried in the mid-ninth millennium B.C (part of the Mesolithic period).

The Dinant area was already populated in Neolithic, Celtic, and Roman times. The first mention of Dinant as a settlement dates from the 7th century, when Perpète of Maastricht, Bishop of Tongeren, moved his principal residence from Maastricht to Dinant and founded the church of Saint Vincent.

Dinant was a part of the Frankish kingdom of Middle Francia from its creation in 843 by the Treaty of Verdun until its dissolution in 855 with the Treaty of Prüm. Like most of Middle Francia, Dinant then became part of the newly formed Kingdom of Lotharingia within the Carolingian Empire. The Kingdom of Lotharingia was abolished in 869–870 and was divided by the Treaty of Meerssen in 870. With this, Dinant passed to West Francia, ruled by king Charles the Bald. With this passing of territory, he gave part of Dinant to be administered by the Count of Namur, with the rest as a part of the Bishopric of Tongeren, which was by that time based in Liège. West Francia eventually lost significant territory and no longer contained Dinant by the 10th century.

In the 11th century, the emperor Henry IV granted several rights over Dinant to the Prince-Bishopric of Liège, including market and justice rights. From that time on, the city became one of the 23 ‘‘bonnes villes’’ (or principal cities) of the Prince-Bishopric. The first stone bridge on the Meuse and major repair to the castle, which had been built earlier, also date from the end of the 11th century. Throughout this period, and until the end of the 18th century, Dinant shared its history with its overlord Liège, sometimes rising in revolt against it, sometimes partaking in its victories and defeats, mostly against the neighbouring County of Namur.

=== Late Middle Ages ===
Its strategic location on the Meuse exposed Dinant to battle and pillage, not always by avowed enemies: in 1466, Philip the Good, Duke of Burgundy, uncle of Louis de Bourbon, Prince-Bishop of Liège, and Philip’s son Charles the Bold punished an uprising in Dinant during the Liège Wars, by casting 800 burghers into the Meuse and setting fire to the city. The city's economic rival was Bouvignes, downriver on the opposite shore of the Meuse.

Late Medieval Dinant and Bouvignes specialised in metalwork, producing finely cast and finished objects in a silvery brass alloy, called dinanderie and supplying aquamaniles, candlesticks, patens and other altar furniture throughout the Meuse valley (giving these objects their cautious designation "Mosan"), the Rhineland and beyond.

Henri Pirenne gained his doctorate in 1883 with a thesis on medieval Dinant.

=== The Old Regime ===
Map of Dinant (circa 1770)

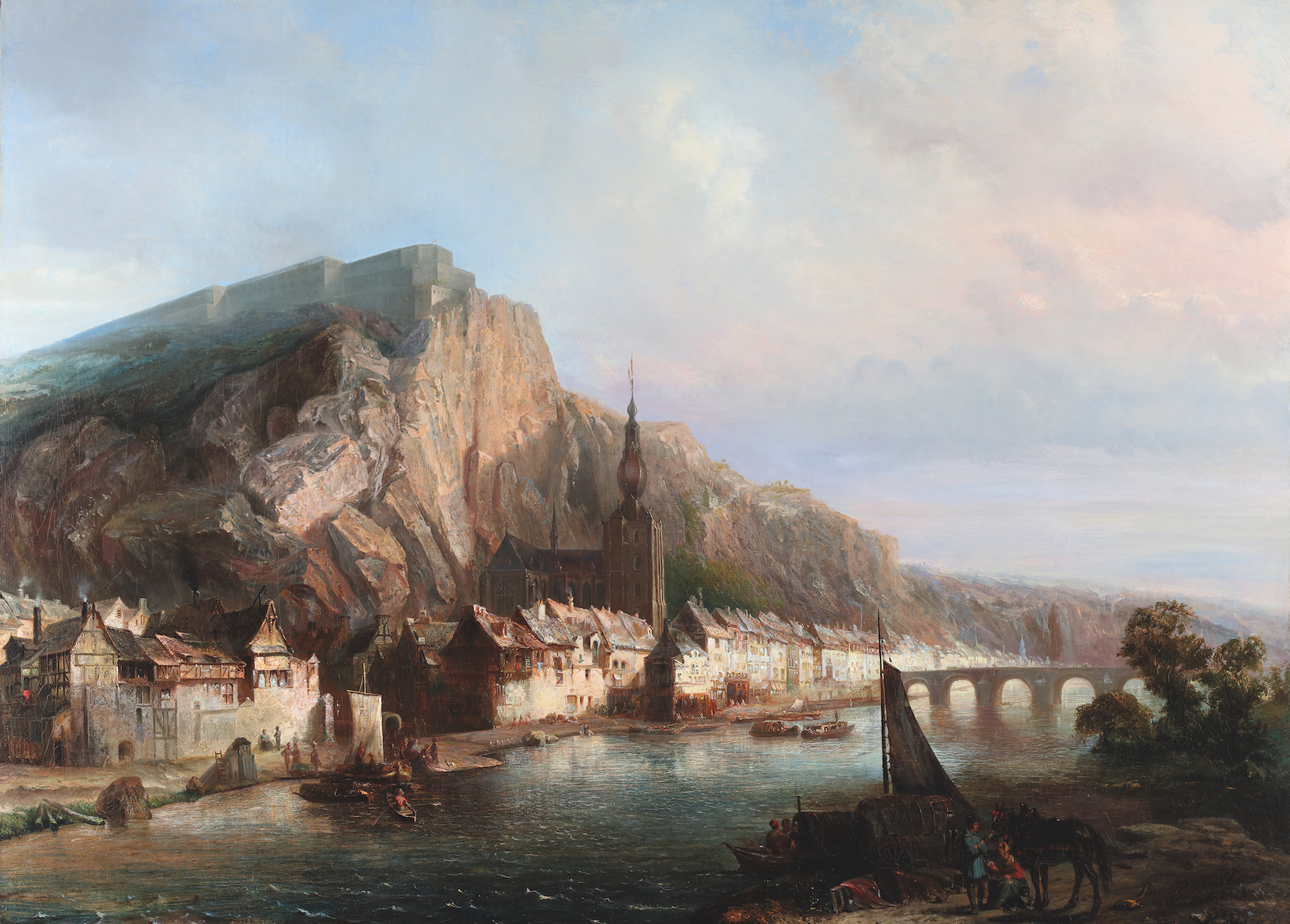
View of Dinant by Pierre Tetar van Elven

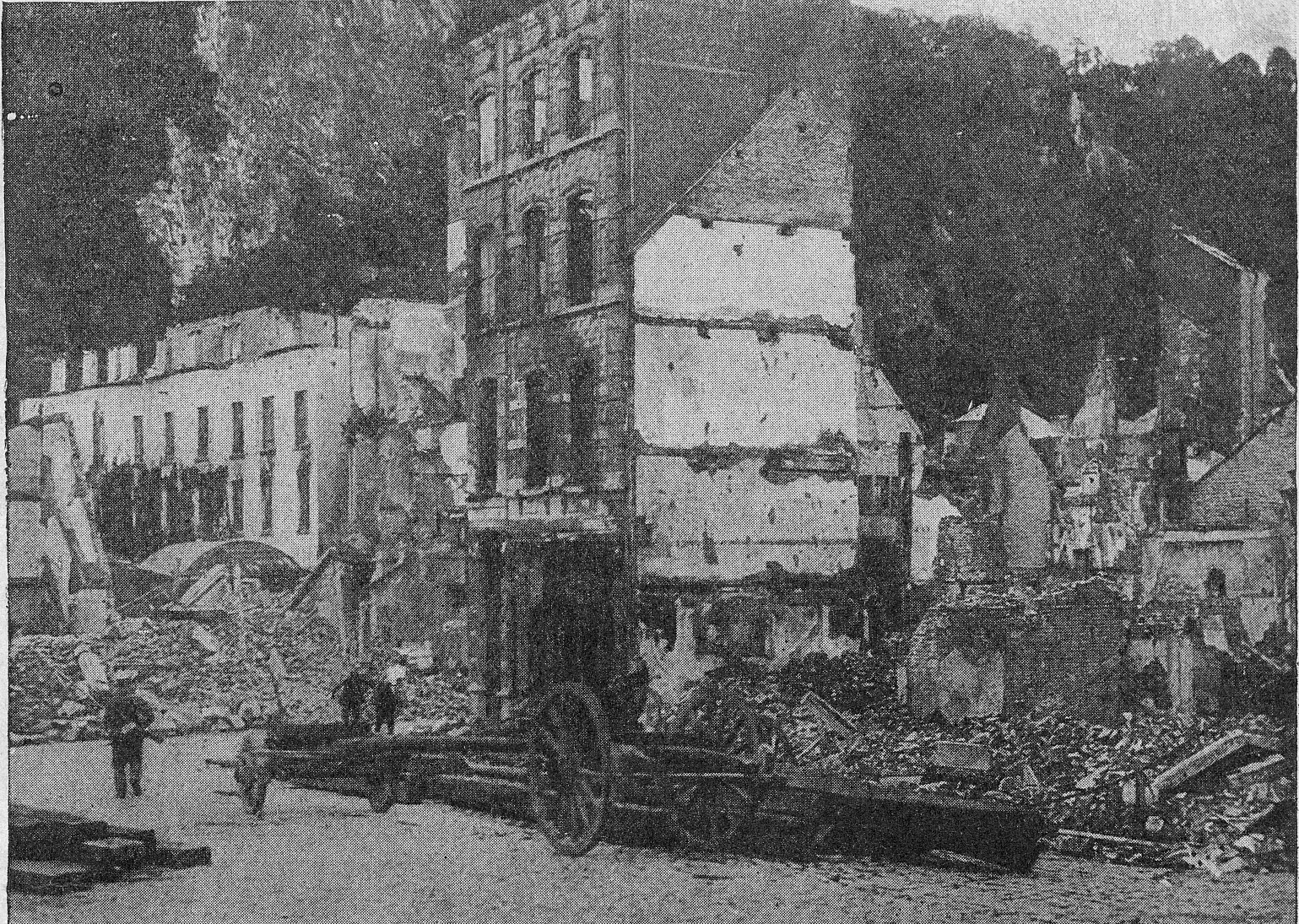
Dinant's destruction in World War I

In the 16th- and 17th-century wars between France and Spain, Dinant suffered destruction, famine, and epidemics, despite its neutrality. In 1675, the French army under Marshal François de Créquy occupied the city. Dinant was briefly taken by the Austrians at the end of the 18th century. The whole Bishopric of Liège was ceded to France in 1795. The dinanderies fell out of fashion and the economy of the city now rested on leather tanning and the manufacture of playing cards. The famous couques de Dinant also appeared at that time.

=== World War I ===
The city suffered devastation again at the beginning of the First World War. On 15 August 1914, French and German troops fought for the town in the Battle of Dinant; among the wounded was Lieut. Charles de Gaulle. On 23 August, 674 inhabitants were summarily executed by Saxon troops of the German Army – the largest massacre committed by the Germans in 1914. Within a month, some five thousand Belgian and French civilians were killed by the Germans at numerous similar occasions.

=== World War II ===
During World War II, the city was again captured by German forces during the invasion of Belgium. German forces of Erwin Rommel's 7th Panzer Division took the town on 13 May 1940, after crossing the River Meuse and defeating the French forces defending the town.

== Sights ==
- The city's landmark is the Collegiate Church of Notre Dame de Dinant. It was rebuilt in Gothic style on its old foundations after falling rocks from the adjacent cliff partially destroyed the former Romanesque-style church in 1227. Several stages for a pair of towers on the west end were completed before the project was abandoned in favour of the present central tower with a famous onion dome and facetted multi-staged lantern.
- Above the church rises the vertical flank of the rocher surmounted by the fortified Citadel of Dinant that was first built in the 11th century to control the Meuse valley. The Prince-Bishopric of Liège rebuilt and enlarged it in 1530; the French destroyed it in 1703. Its present aspect, with the 408-step rock-hewn stairs, is due to rebuilding in 1821, during the United Kingdom of the Netherlands phase of Dinant's chequered history. A cable car is available during the high season to take visitors from the Collegiate Church of Notre-Dame to the top of the Citadel.
- Away from the main block is the Rocher Bayard that was said to have been split by the giant hoof of Bayard, the giant horse carrying the four sons of Duke Aymon on their legendary flight from Charlemagne through the Ardennes, told in Les Quatre Fils Aymon, a famous 12th-century chanson de geste. In reality the rock was split by the soldiers of Louis XIV after the conquest of Dinant in order to construct a road alongside the Meuse.
- The house of Adolphe Sax, inventor of the saxophone, in the street of the same name. A little museum, Mr Sax's House, commemorates his life and saxophones.
- Grotte de Dinant La Merveilleuse, a series of caves with impressive stalagmite and stalactite structures, is near the south west of the town.
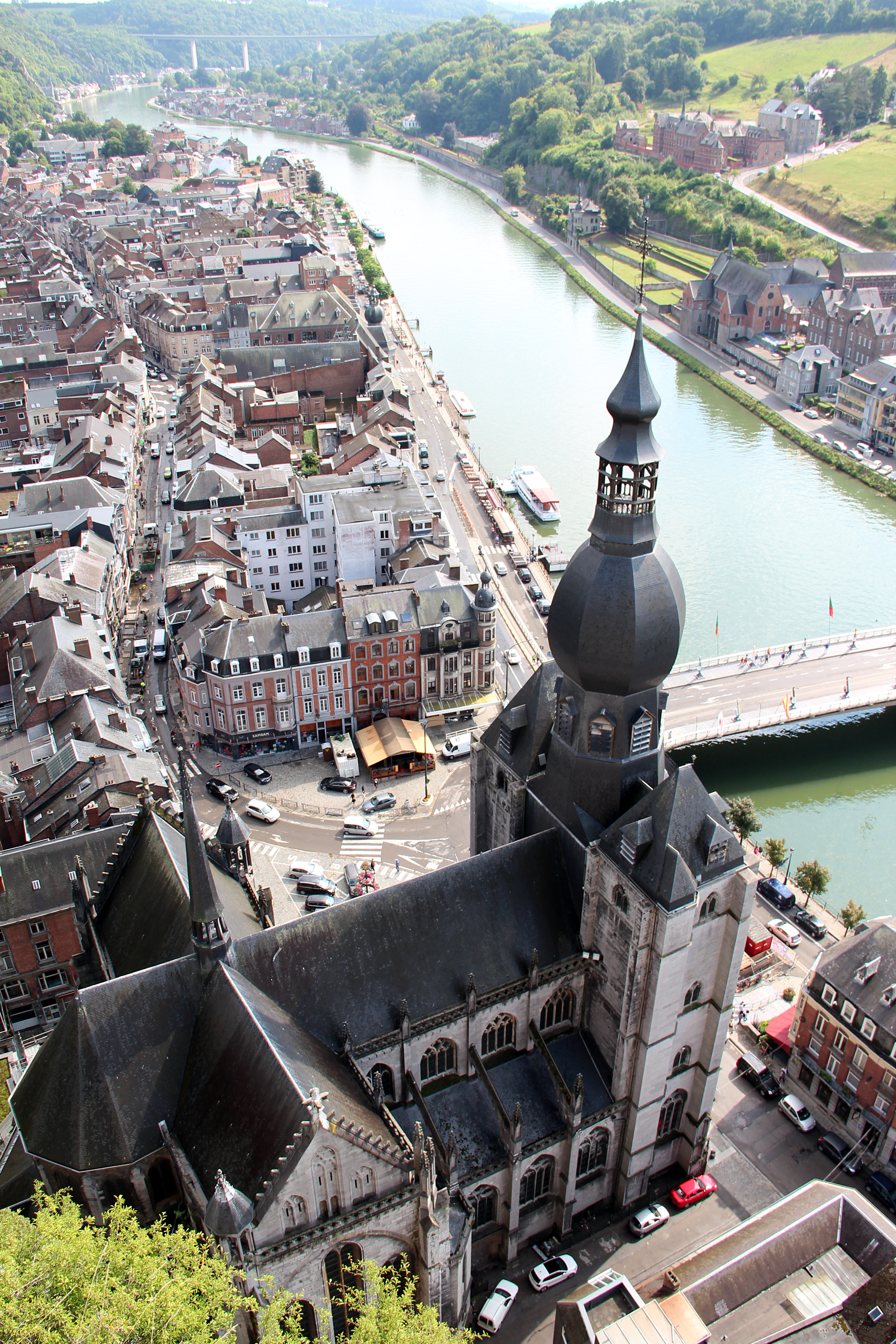
Dinant towards the south, seen from the citadel

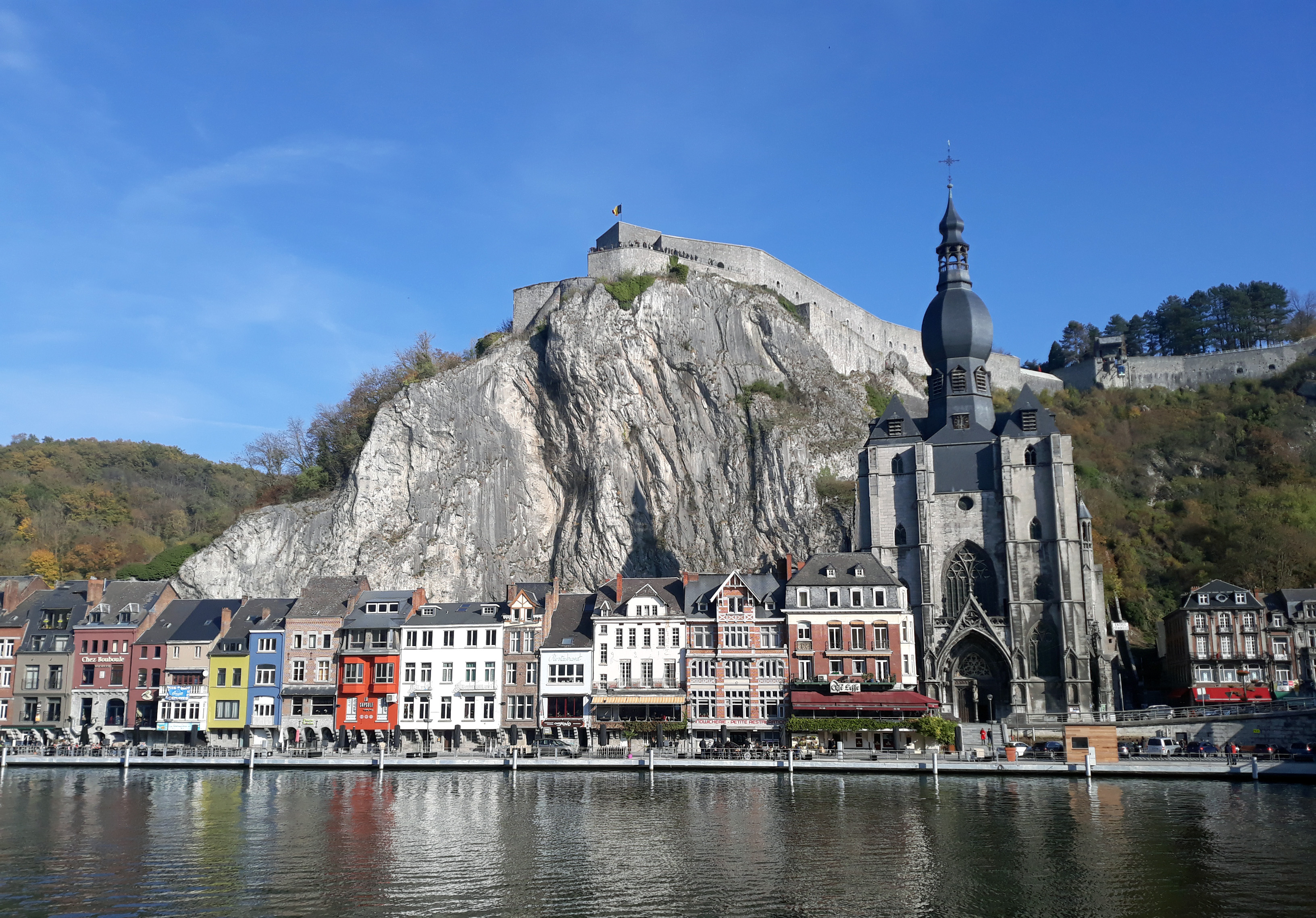
View from the left bank of the Meuse

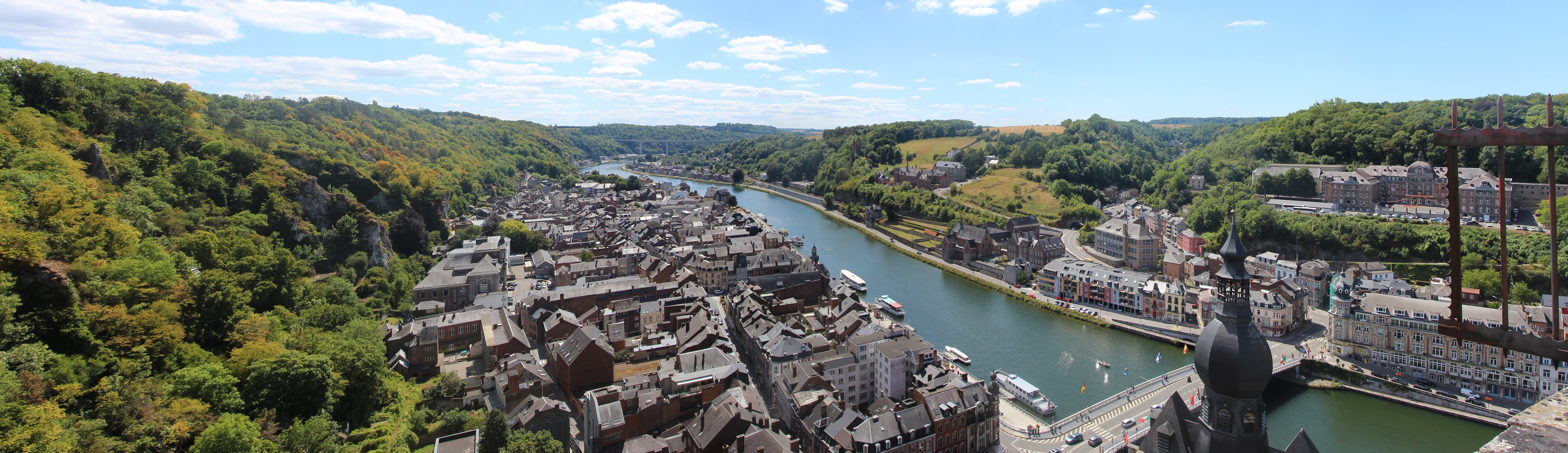
2019 panorama of Dinant

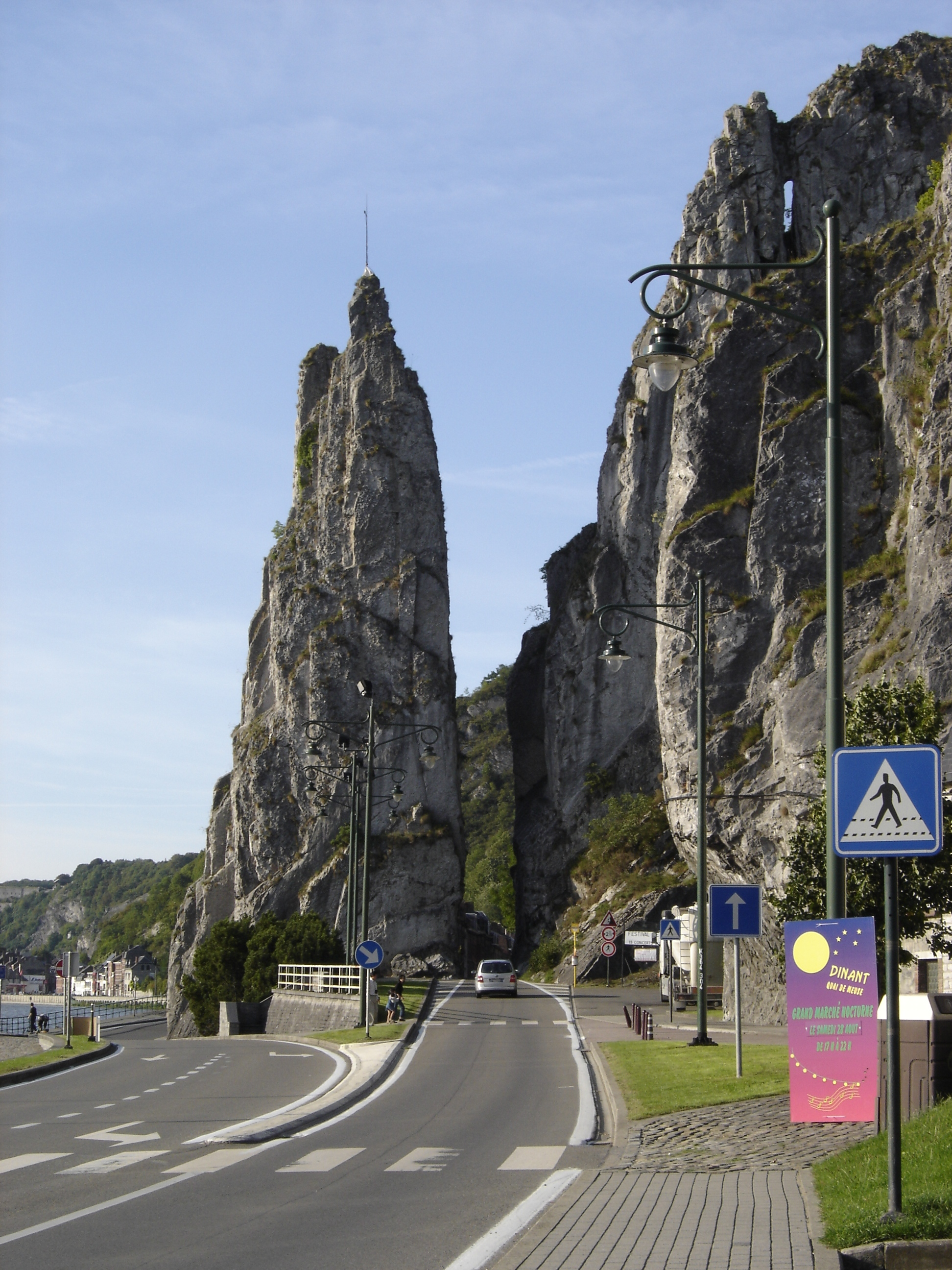
Rocher Bayard

== Gastronomic culture ==
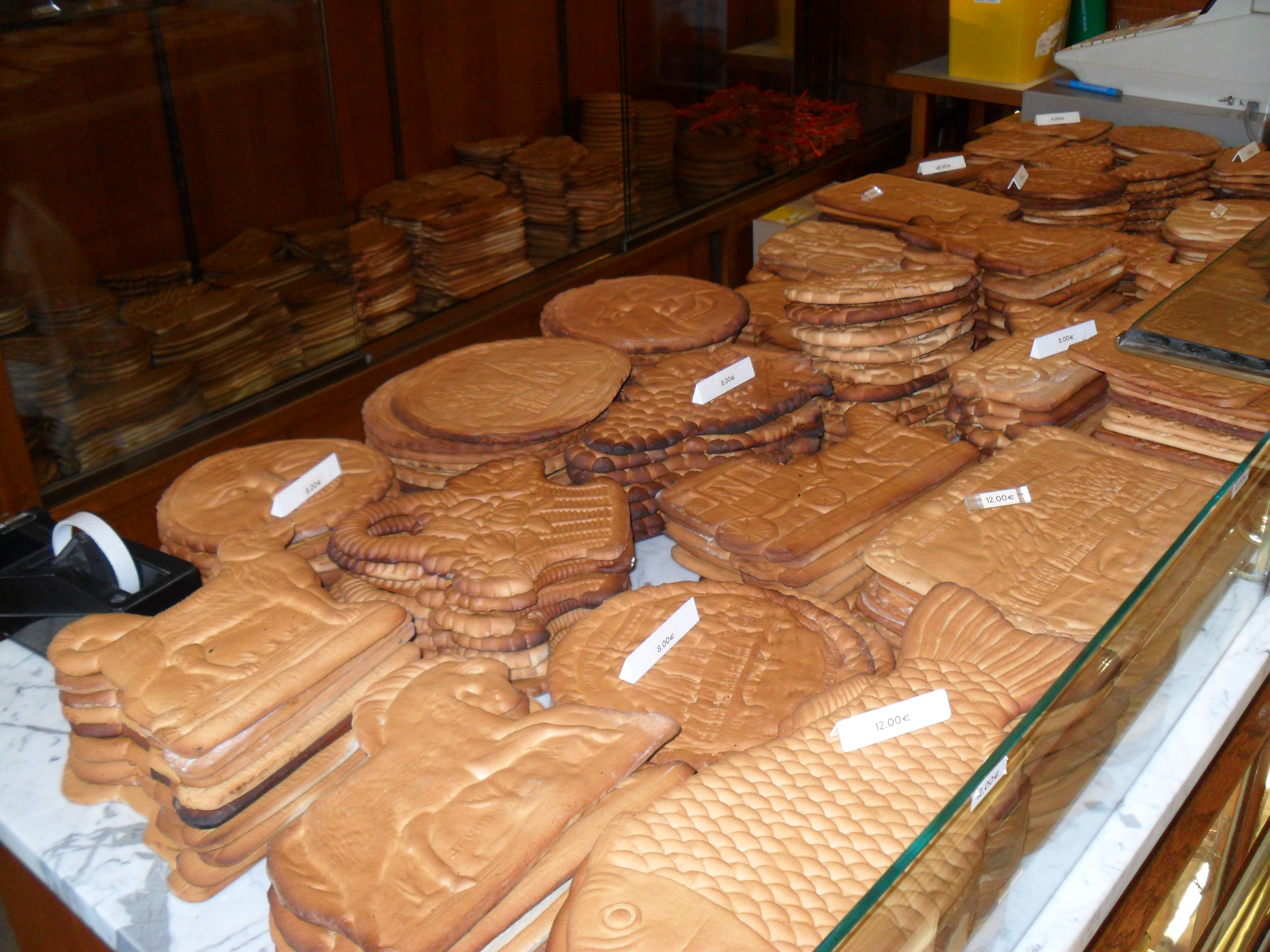
Couques de Dinant at a Dinant bakery

- The Flamiche dinantaise is the local version of quiche made with a cheese called "boulette de Romedenne".
- The couque de Dinant is Europe's hardest biscuit, with a honey-sweetened flavour, that is impressed with a carved wooden mould before baking.
- The beer brand Leffe originates from Dinant and there is a museum there.

== Transport ==
Dinant's railway station is on the left bank of the river. There is hourly train service to Brussels, about a 90-minute ride.

== Healthcare ==
Dinant hosts the Saint-Vincent and Saint-Anne sites (Centre Hospitalier de Dinant) of the CHU UCLouvain Namur university hospital, the provinces' largest employer and serving as teaching hospital for the University of Louvain.

== Notable people ==
- David of Dinant, philosopher (birth in Dinant is uncertain, 12th century)
- Joachim Patinir or Patenier, 1485–1524, the first specialist landscape painter
- Antoine Joseph Wiertz, painter (19th century)
- Adolphe Sax, musician and inventor of many instruments, including the saxophone and Saxtuba (19th century)
- Georges Pire, priest of the Dominican Order and Nobel Peace Prize recipient for 1958
- André-Eugène Pirson (Dinant, 21 March 1817-Brussels, 28 December 1881), governor of the National Bank of Belgium (NBB) from 1877 until 1881
- André Buzin, artist and stamp designer (20th century)
- Alex Miskirtchian, boxer

== Twin cities and twinning ==
- Philippines: Cagayan de Oro
- England: Hoddesdon, England
- Greece: Chios
- France: Dinan
- France: Disneyland Paris

== See also ==
- Rape of Belgium
- Auxbrebis
