= André Buzin =

Belgian artist

André Buzin (born 1946 in Dinant) is a Belgian artist who paints animals and flowers. He is known on the philatelic scene for the Birds series, a definitive stamp series of Belgium.

Buzin designed his first stamps for Zaire in 1984. In Africa, he also created some stamp series for Mauritania and Rwanda. Almost all depicted local animals, but he designs stamps for the 1984 Summer Olympics.

His major series have been issuing by Belgian Post. In 1984, he prepared some paintings figuring birds that were accepted by the postal authority. They became 1985 the first stamps of the Birds series, still in use more than twenty years later. Thanks to this series he was awarded by about ten philatelic artistic prices in Belgium and the "Prix du Roi" in 1995.

In the late 1990s, he began designing stamps about flowers for booklets.
