= Mr Sax's House =

Music instrument museums in Dinant, Namur, Belgium

- Maison de Monsieur Sax; Huis van Sax
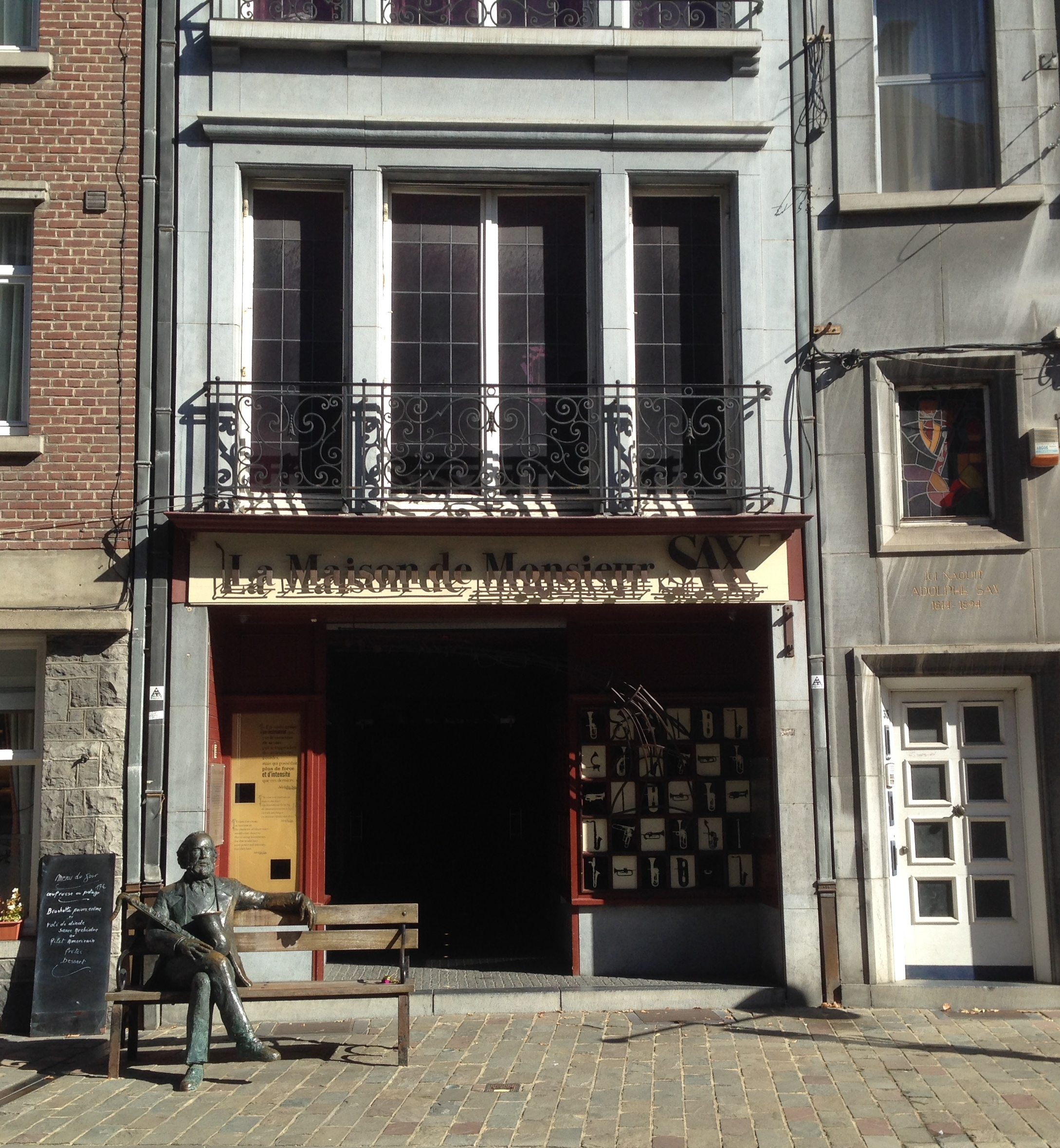

- Location within Belgium
- Location: Dinant
- Coordinates: 50°15′42.536″N 4°54′39.228″E
- Type: music instrument museums
- Parking: in the city center
- Website: sax.dinant.be/en/sax-and-the-city

Mr Sax's House (French: Maison de Monsieur Sax; Dutch: Huis van Sax) is a little museum in Dinant in the Belgian province of Namur. It is dedicated to Adolphe Sax (1814–1894). Sax was a builder of musical instruments and is foremost remembered for his invention of the saxophone.

== Interior ==
At the front of the House a brass statue of Sax is seated on a bench. The entrance is decorated with earthenware titles. A number of museum pieces are installed on the wall and ceiling. The limitations of the floor space have further been solved interactively, and with a men's high book that introduces visitors to the life of sax. Visitors can listen to a variety of saxophones, as well as to saxophones in a variety of music styles, and are informed by images on a screen. The center is open daily and entrance is free. No official visits are organized. You can come in groups with your own guide.

== Adolphe Sax and Dinant ==
The House is located in the birthplace of Sax, Dinant, in the French language part of Belgium. Near the House and in other places in Dinant, artwork reminds of his connection with the city. On both sides of the Charles de Gaulle Bridge a number of huge artworks of colourful saxophones are presented. The name of the tourist flyer is Sax and the City.

Sax has built more instruments than saxophones alone, and had a factory that was focused on production. In a certain period he employed more than two hundred workers. He lived just a few years in Dinant and stayed a great part of his life in Paris. He was the predominant supplier of brass instruments to the army of king William I of the Netherlands, who reigned in Belgium too in those years.

== Impression ==
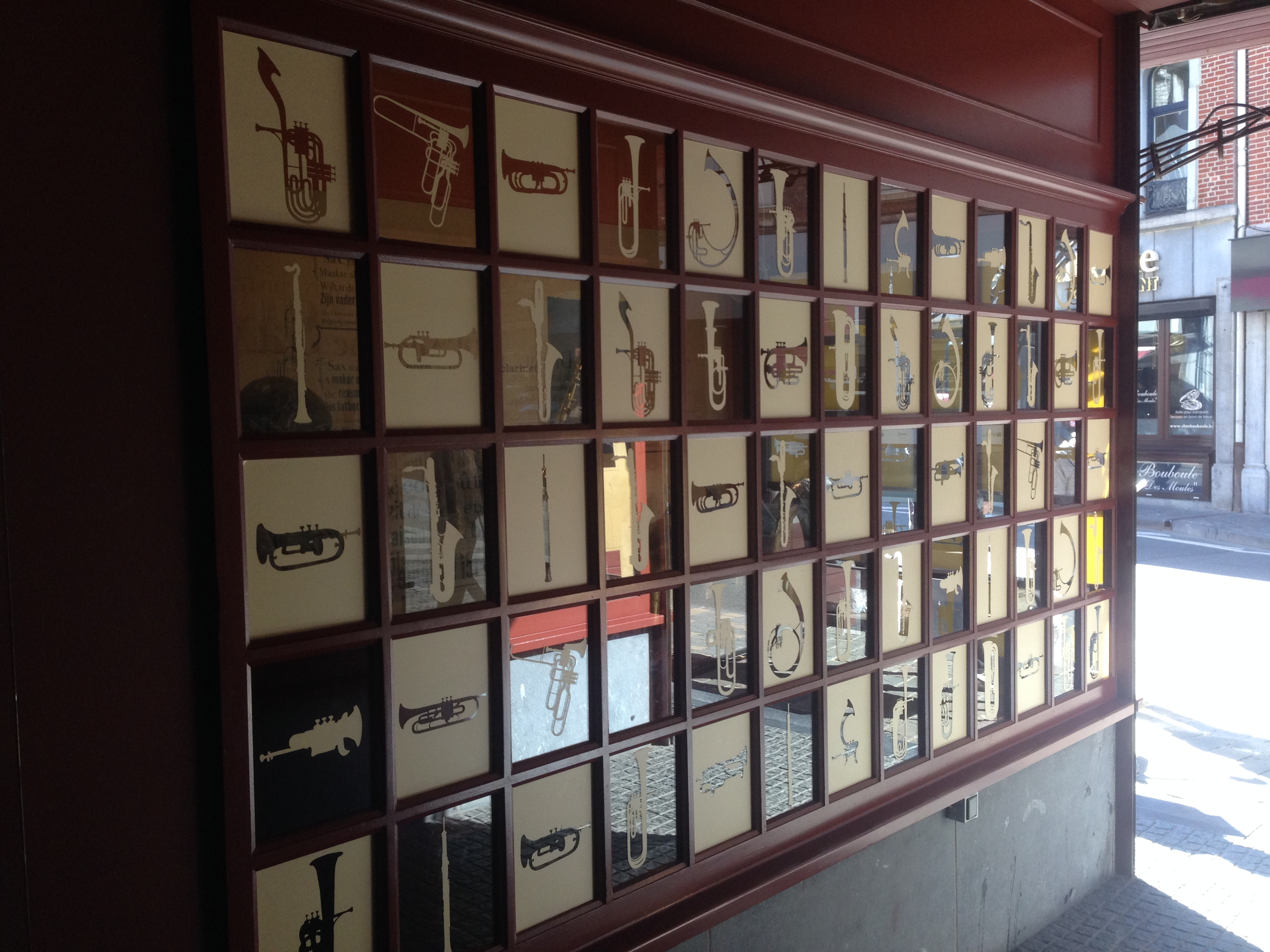

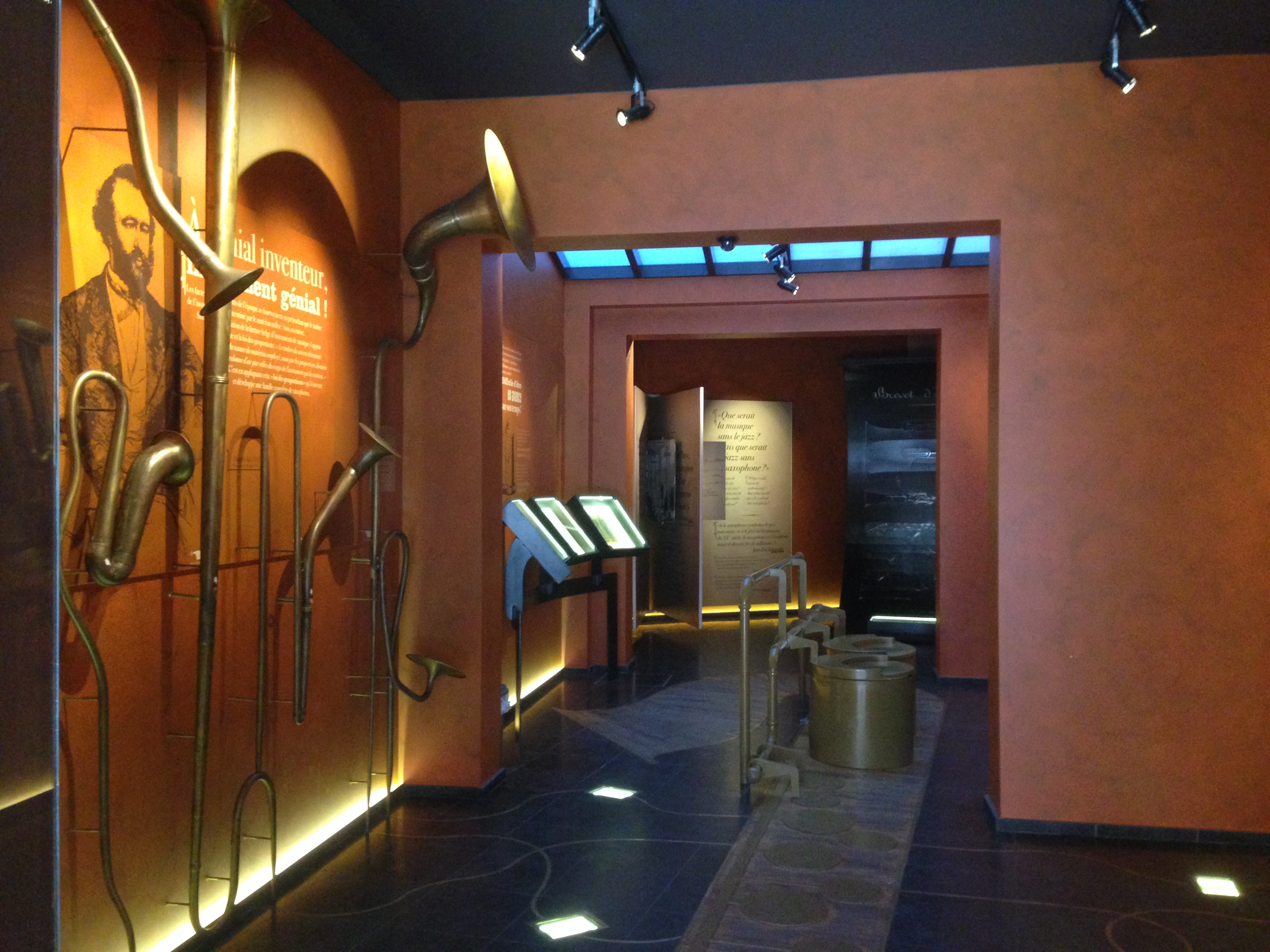

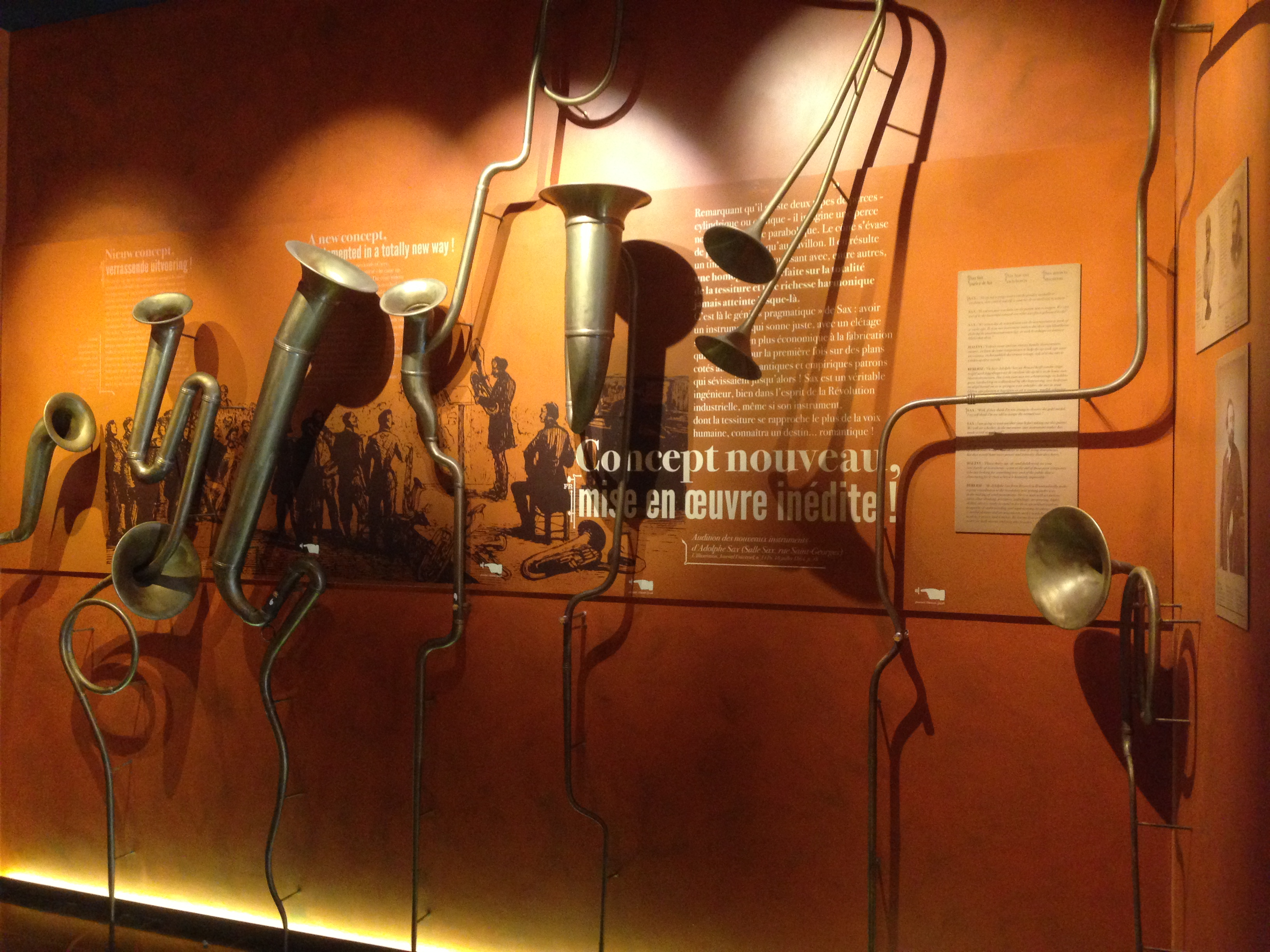

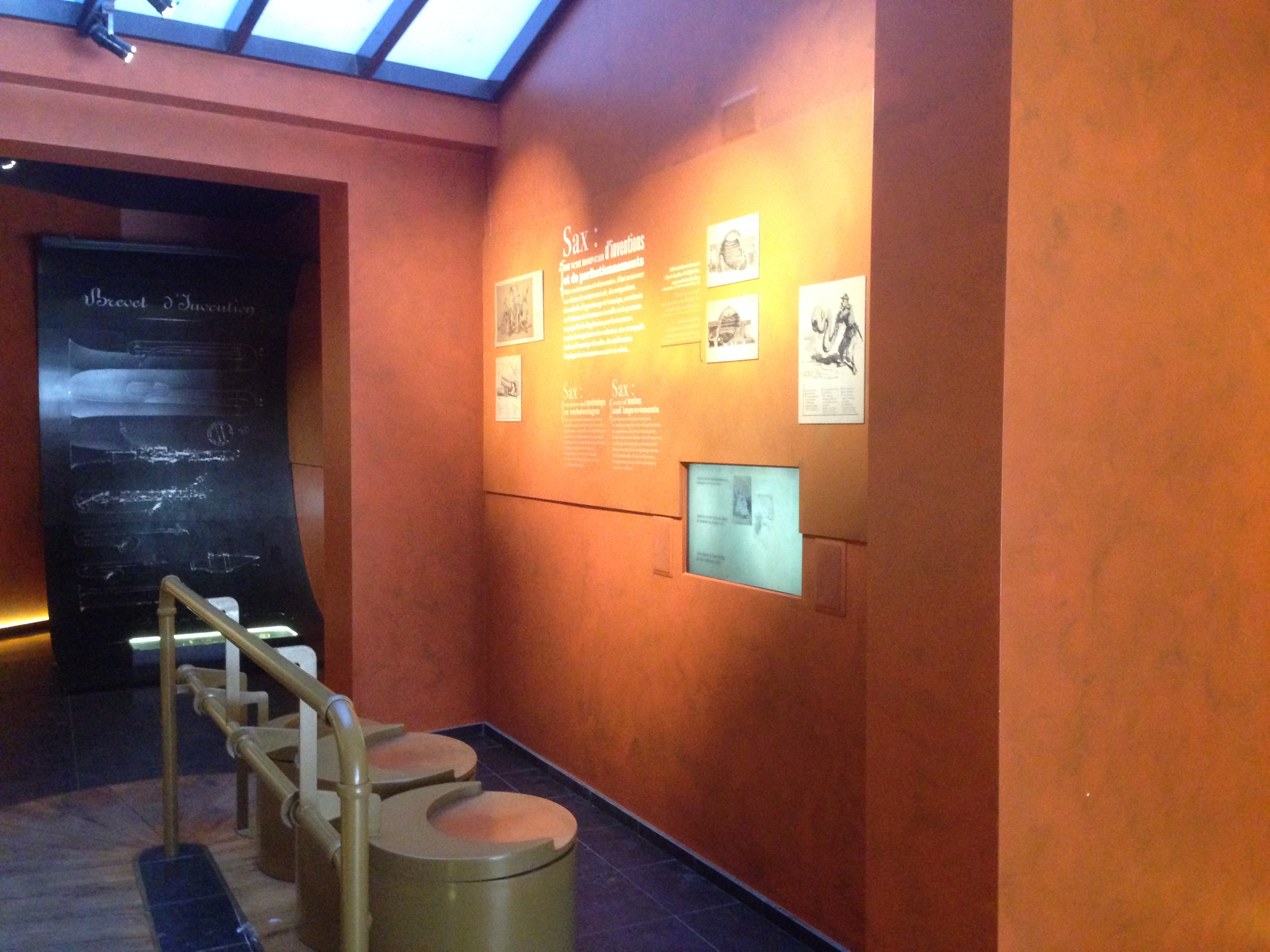

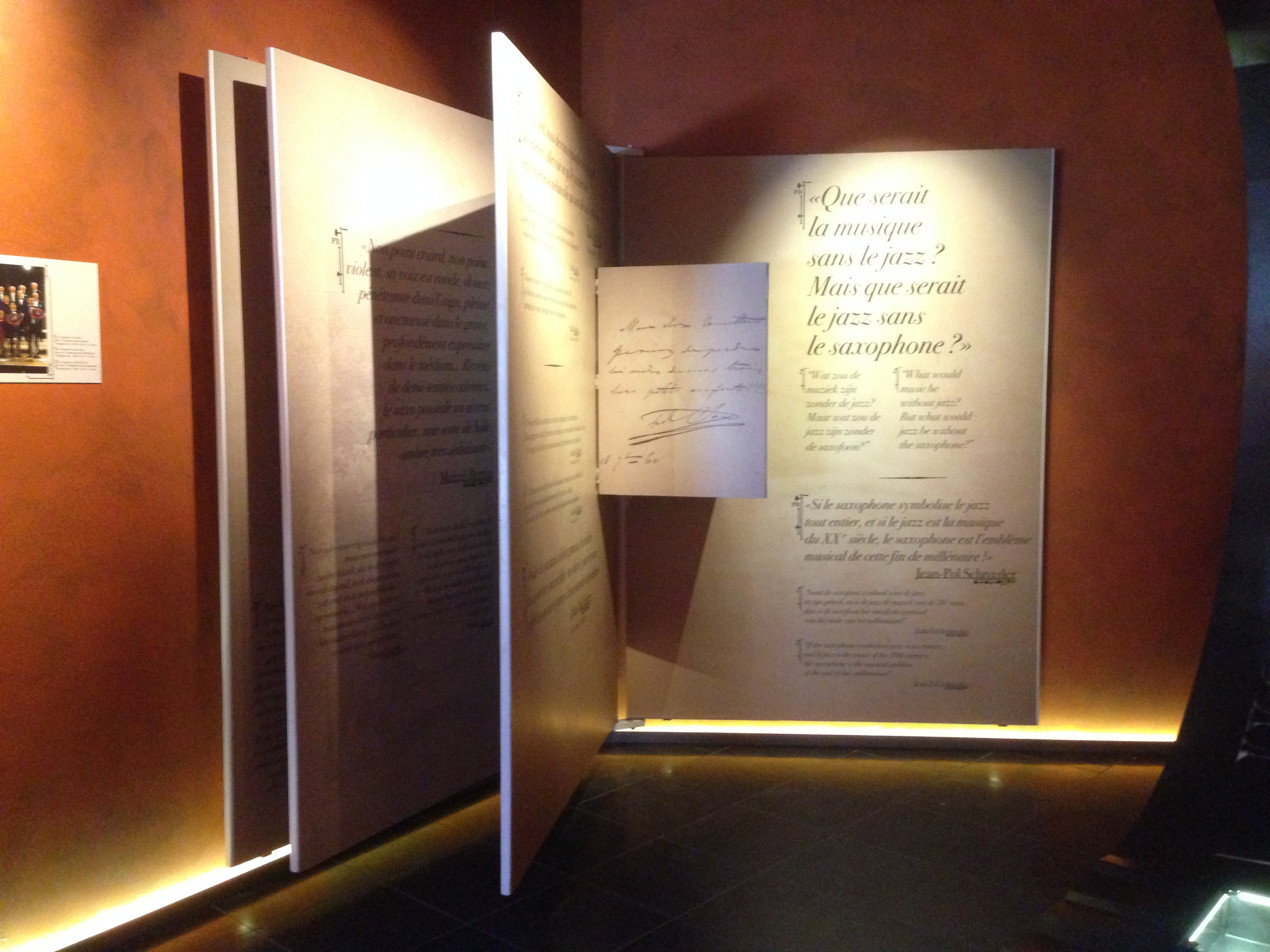

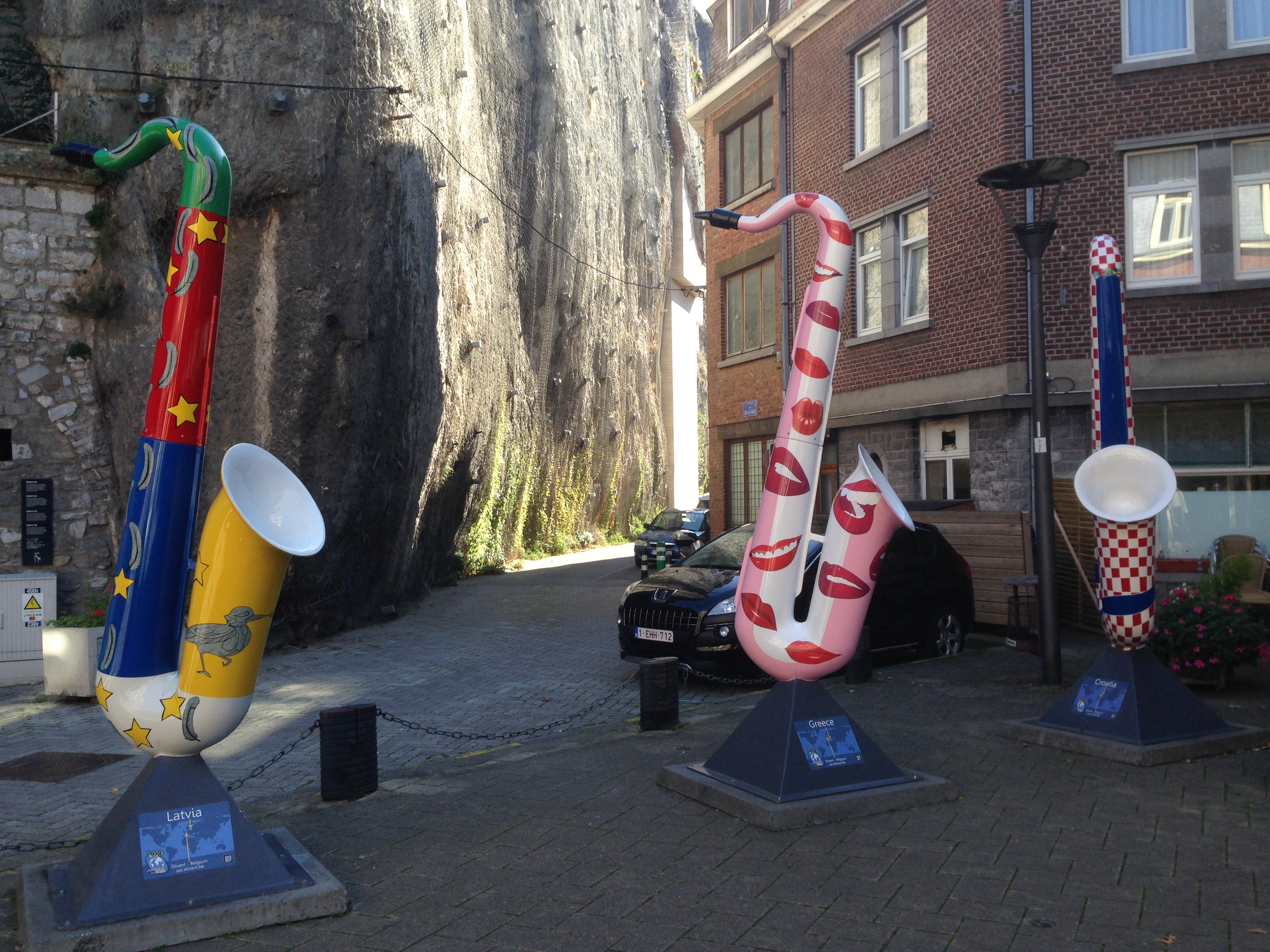
