= Margaux woman =

Margaux Woman is a prehistoric woman who lived during the mid-ninth millennium B.C. in the Meuse Valley of Belgium near Dinant. Initially, anthropologists named her, Mos'anne, after the French name for the valley where researchers discovered her remains buried in the Margaux Cave during archaeological excavations in 1988. The valley in which the site is located is named after the river flowing through it, the Meuse, a major European river, rising in France and flowing through Belgium and the Netherlands before draining into the North Sea from the Rhine–Meuse–Scheldt delta. The river has a total length of 925 km (575 miles) and the associated valley area has a long history of occupation by humans since prehistoric times.

The cave contained burials only of women and the cave appears to have been used for the ritual burials of the women over several centuries despite the apparent mobile hunter-gatherer lifestyle of the ancient population. Discovery of this significant burial pattern suggests heretofore missing insight into a social organization of the culture of that ancient population as based upon matriarchy that might not have been suggested from existing results of research of that period and it encourages further archaeological research.

The remains of Margaux Woman date to approximately 8,500 B.C., which corresponds to the Mesolithic period of archaeological stratification that often is referred to as the Middle Stone Age by historians. Artifacts associated with her remains include a feathered headdress and jewelry composed of feathers, leather, and bone. Her personal ornamentation included tattoos.

Anatomical, genetic, and archaeological data made it possible to reconstruct her face and the living conditions of Margaux Woman. With modern techniques, research at the Ghent University in Belgium established some of her physical characteristics in much greater detail than could be suggested at the time of her discovery and, in 2025, news was released of a reconstruction having been created of her head and shoulders. The recreation effort involved the cooperation of bioanthropologists, geneticists, archaeologists, and artists participating in the interdisciplinary ROAM project (Regional Outlook on Ancient Migration), and collaborating with Dutch artists, Kennis and Kennis, who executed the reconstruction, and Ulco Glimmerveen, who made the illustration. Further genetic research will attempt to determine whether significant relationships among the women buried in the cave might assist interpretation of the social organization regarding leadership or familial patterns of the ancient population to which Margaux Woman belonged.

Analysis of her nuclear DNA indicates that Margaux Woman was a typical member of the Western European hunter-gatherer population at the time, exhibiting the blue eyes persisting after birth often found among the phenotype. She exhibited hair color often found among existing specimens discovered but notably, Margaux Woman had much lighter skin color than found to date. On her nose and along her clavicle, she had tattoos on her relatively lighter skin than generally detected among existing examples of the prehistoric populations of the time. Her lighter skin color is considered significant because this has expanded knowledge about the physical characteristics of her contemporaries, of which the limited number of whom, whose remains had been able to provide evidence of skin color, had exhibited darker skin tones, such as Cheddar Man who was discovered in England in 1903.

== See also ==
- Cheddar Man
- Cultural anthropology
- List of human evolution fossils
- Matriarchy
