= Battle of Brustem =

1467 battle of the Second Liège War

Coordinates: 50.8017°N 5.2175°E

- Part of the Second Liège War
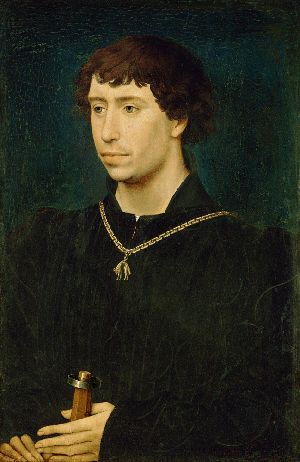
- Portrait of Charles the Bold
Date	28 October 1467
Location	Brustem, near Sint-Truiden (present-day Belgium)
Result	Burgundian victory

Belligerents
Burgundian State	Prince-Bishopric of Liège

Commanders and leaders
Charles the Bold	Raes van Heers

Strength
c. 25,000	c. 12,000

Casualties and losses
800	4,000

The Battle of Brustem was fought on 28 October 1467 in Brustem, near Sint-Truiden (present-day Belgium) between the Burgundian State and the Prince-Bishopric of Liège, as part of the Second Liège War.

== Prelude ==
In 1465, Philip the Good had won the First Liège War against Prince-Bishop Louis de Bourbon, newly-appointed by himself. This had led to the humiliating Peace of Sint-Truiden. When Philip died in 1467, the people from Liège rose again against the hated Prince-Bishop, who fled the city.

Liège counted on the promised military support from King Louis XI of France, also at war with the new Burgundian Duke Charles the Bold. Charles gathered an army of some 25,000 professional soldiers in Leuven and moved on Liège. Louis XI did nothing.

== Battle ==
The army of Liège was composed of 12,000 civilians and 500 cavalry. They were commanded by Raes van Heers, his wife Pentecote d'Arkel, and Jean de Wilde, lord of Kessenich.

Raes positioned his troops in the marshy area between Brustem, Sint-Truiden, and Ordingen to do battle. In this way he tried to diminish the effect of the Burgundian artillery. Charles came from the direction of Sint-Truiden, where he left a few thousand men behind, including 500 English archers, to prevent an intervention of the city's garrison.

On 28 October, Charles ordered his vanguard under Adolph of Cleves, Lord of Ravenstein to attack. Raes commanded his troops to hold position and wait for the arrival of reinforcements, but the militia from Tongeren counter-attacked nevertheless, and drove back the troops of Ravenstein, killing a considerable number of archers.
But this was what Charles had been prepared for. His second line was armed with long two-handed swords, ideal for close combat. The Liège militia was quickly stopped in their advance and pushed back, in what soon became a rout. Raes van Heers and the French envoy François Royer, Baillif of Lyon, were amongst the first to flee the battlefield.

The Burgundians killed everybody that fell into their hands. Liège suffered some 4,000 casualties and the rest of the army was only saved by the evening darkness.

== Aftermath ==
After the battle, Charles moved on Liège and forced the city to surrender on 12 November.
The Prince-Bishopric became a Burgundian protectorate under Guy of Humbercourt and all cities in the County of Loon were forced to remove their defences.
