= Pierre Tetar van Elven =

Dutch painter (1828–1908)

- Born: Peter Henricus Theodorus Tetar Elven; 30 August 1828; Molenbeek-Saint-Jean, Brussels, United Kingdom of the Netherlands
- Died: 1 May 1908 (aged 79); Milan, Kingdom of Italy
- Education: Royal Academy of Art
- Style: Watercolor; panoramic; veduta
- Spouse: Anna Maria Angela Felicita Fumao (m. 1856)
- Children: 3

Peter Henricus Theodorus (Pierre) Tetar Elven (30 August 1828 – 1 May 1908) was a Dutch painter, draftsman, etcher, watercolorist and panorama painter of the 19th century. He had a preference for architecture, landscapes, and Italian cityscapes (vedutas). He also painted a few genre pieces for French high society.

== Early life and education ==
Pierre was the son of the painter John Baptist Tetar Elven (1805–1839) and Sophia Francisca Noll (or Noel?). Sophie Henry was his sister, born in Molenbeek-Saint-Jean, Brussels in 1830. Joseph Edouard, his brother, was born in 1832 in Amsterdam. The architect Martinus Gerardus Tetar Elven, a founding member of Arti et Amicitiae, and the painter Paul Tetar Elven were, respectively, his uncle and cousin. The family Tetar Elven occupied a building at Number 16 Spinhuissteeg.

Pierre began his training in Amsterdam, but moved to The Hague, where he studied at the Royal Academy of Arts.

== Career ==
Pierre left around 1853 for Milan; in 1855 he lived in Rome. Between 1856 and 1863 he was in Turin. In 1861, he was appointed court painter by Victor Emmanuel II of Italy. and did some paintings that the Risorgimento supported. In 1866, he left for Tunisia and Turkey, possibly traveling with Tinco Lycklama à Nijeholt, whom he portrayed a few times in oriental attire. In 1869, he lived in Paris. Around 1873, he moved back to Amsterdam and into a building at Number 33 Plantage Muidergracht. There he lived with his wife and children. In an unknown year, before the end of the century, he returned to Milan. His presence is attested there in 1898 by the painting “Women in the Farmhouse”.

== Personal life ==
On 13 May 1856, he married Anna Maria Angela Felicita Fumao (or Annette Fumero) (1831–?). They had three daughters.

== Death and legacy ==
He died in Milan on 1 May 1908.

His works hang in Milan, Genoa, Turin, and Haarlem. The Musée de la Castre in Cannes holds a few works as well, such as the Bal Travesti chez le baron Lycklama

== Selected works ==
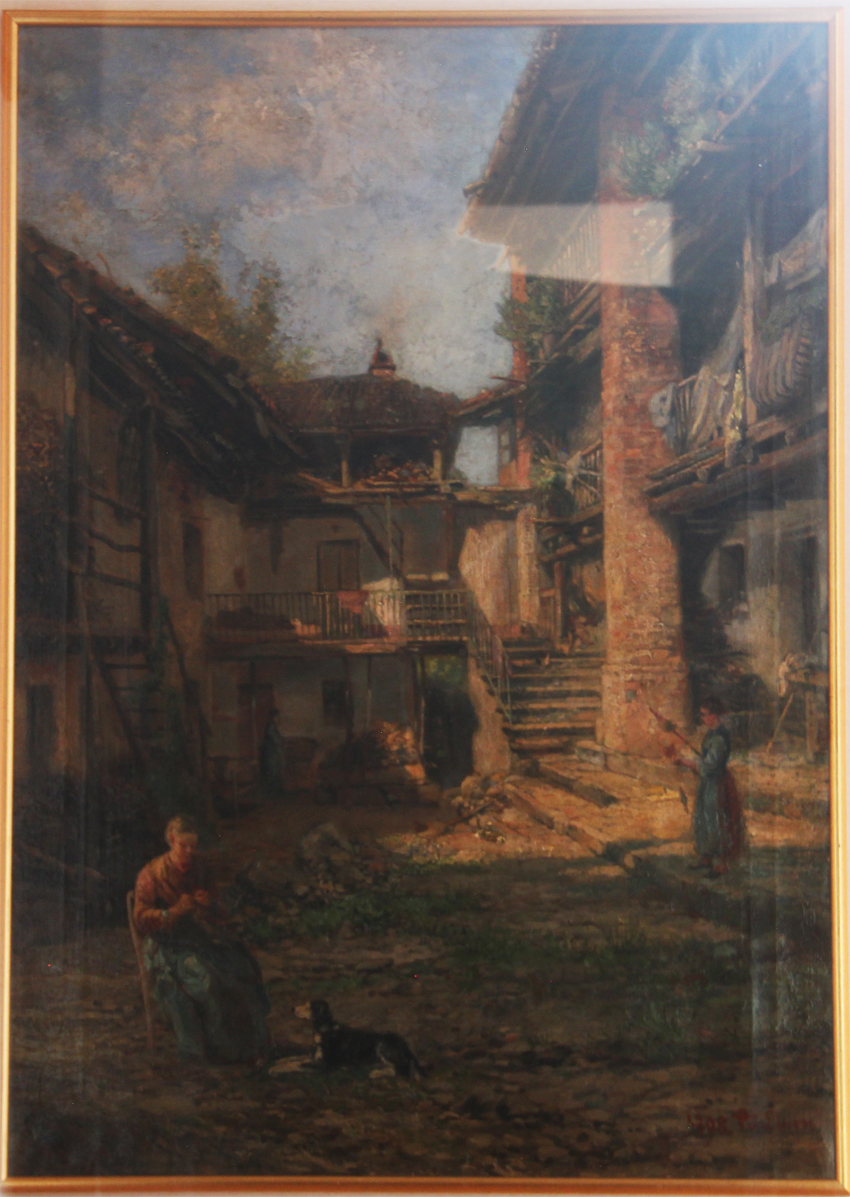
Donne in Cascina (Women in the Farmhouse)

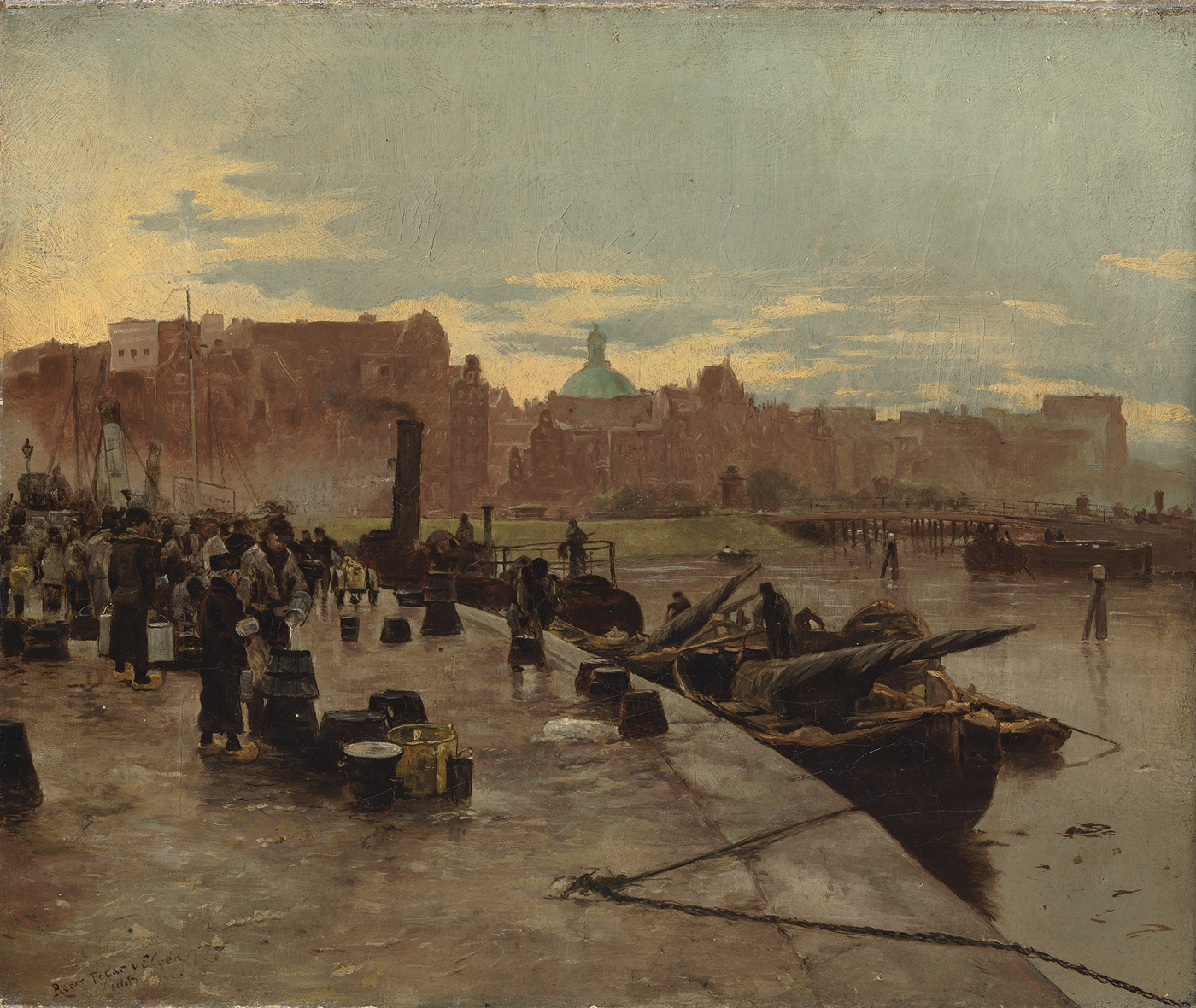
Milk market on Prins Hendrikkade

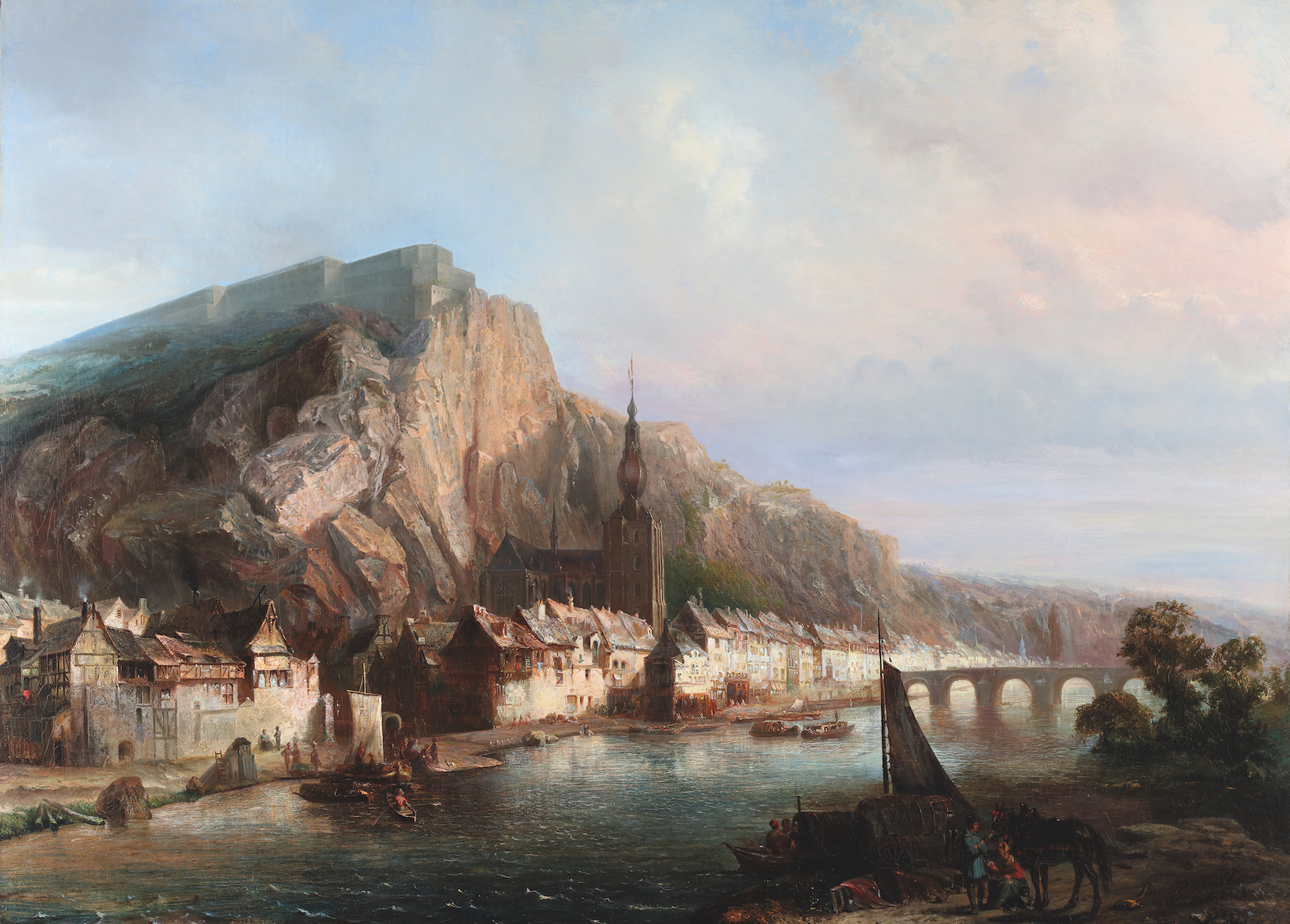
View of Dinant, Belgium
