= Château Miranda =

Demolished château in Wallonia, Belgium

Coordinates: 50.221°N 4.990°E

- Celles, province of Namur, Wallonia, Belgium
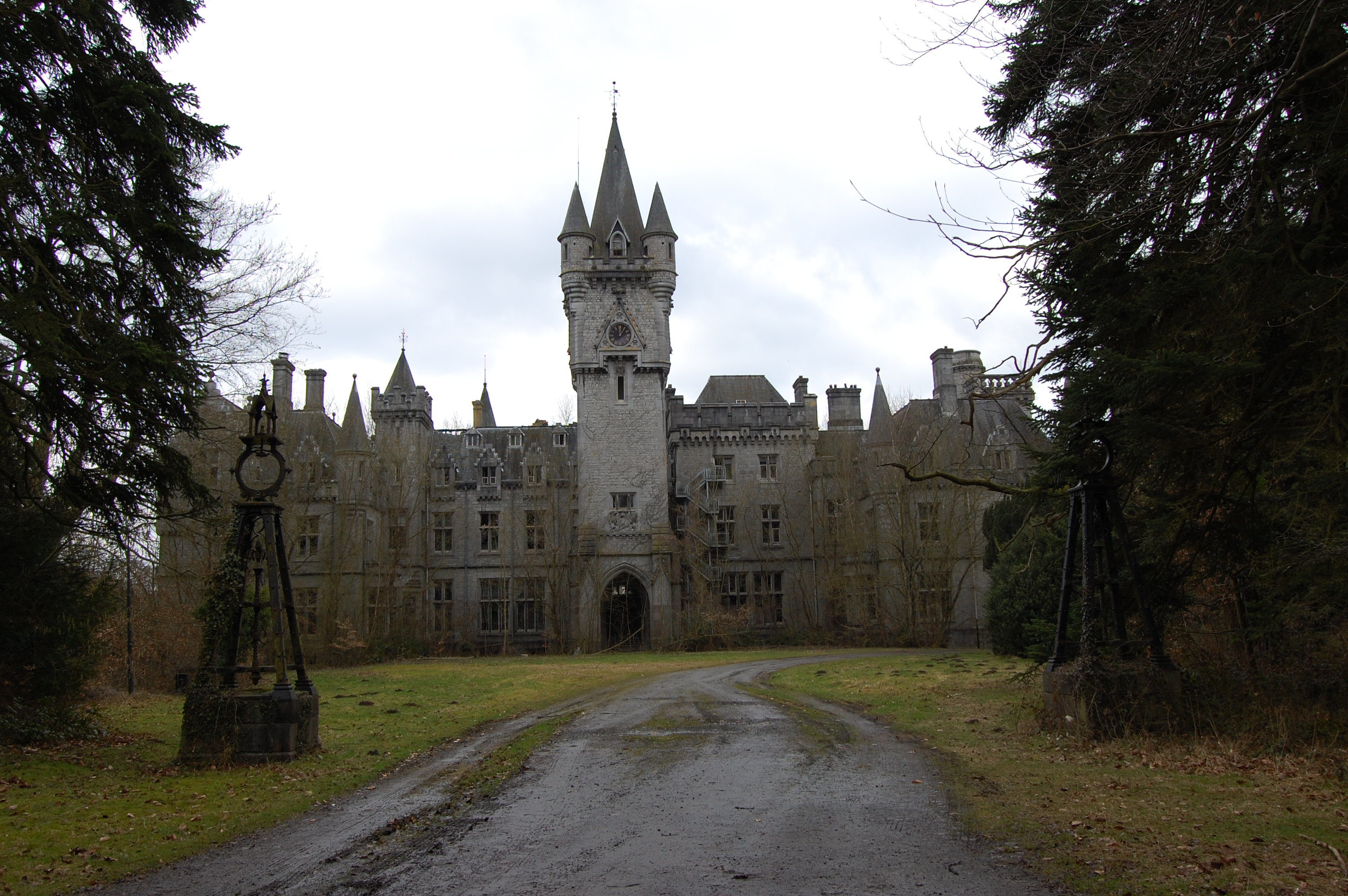
- General view of Château Miranda before demolition began in October 2016

Site information
- Type: Neo-Gothic, Château
- Open to the public: No
- Condition: Demolished

Site history
- Built: 1866
- Built by: Edward Milner
- Materials: Stone

Château Miranda (English: Miranda Castle), also known as Château de Noisy (English: Noisy Castle) was a 19th-century neo-Gothic castle in Celles, province of Namur, Wallonia, Belgium, in the region of the Ardennes. Demolition of the château began in October 2016 and was completed by October 2017.

== History ==
The château was planned and designed in 1866 by the English architect Edward Milner under commission from the Liedekerke-De Beaufort family, who had left their previous home, Vêves Castle, during the French Revolution. Milner died in 1884 before the château was finished. Construction was completed in 1907 after the clock tower was erected.

Their descendants remained in occupation until World War II. A small portion of the Battle of the Bulge took place on the property, and it was during that time that the château was occupied by German forces.

In 1950, Château Miranda was renamed "Château de Noisy" when it was taken over by the National Railway Company of Belgium (NMBS/SNCB) as a holiday camp for children. It lasted as a children's camp until the late 1970s.

The château stood empty and abandoned from 1991 because the cost to maintain it was too great, and a search for investors in the property failed. Although the municipality of Celles had offered to take it over, the family refused, and the enormous building lingered in a derelict state, succumbing to decay and vandalism. Parts of the structure were heavily damaged in a fire, and many ceiling areas began collapsing. Despite this, it became a favourite venue for urban exploration.

== Demolition ==
Demolition work began in 2016 amid concern over the structural stability of the building. The demolition took approximately a year, which began in October 2016 with the removal of the roof. By October 2017, the château had been completely demolished. The last part to be removed was the central tower.

== In popular culture ==
The château was used as a filming location by the American television series Hannibal. The building is shown as Castle Lecter in Lithuania. The château was also used as a filming location for the Belgian movie Het huis Anubis en de wraak van Arghus (English: The house of Anubis and the revenge of Arghus)

The design of Frankenstein Manor in Universal Epic Universe was based on Château Miranda.

== Gallery ==
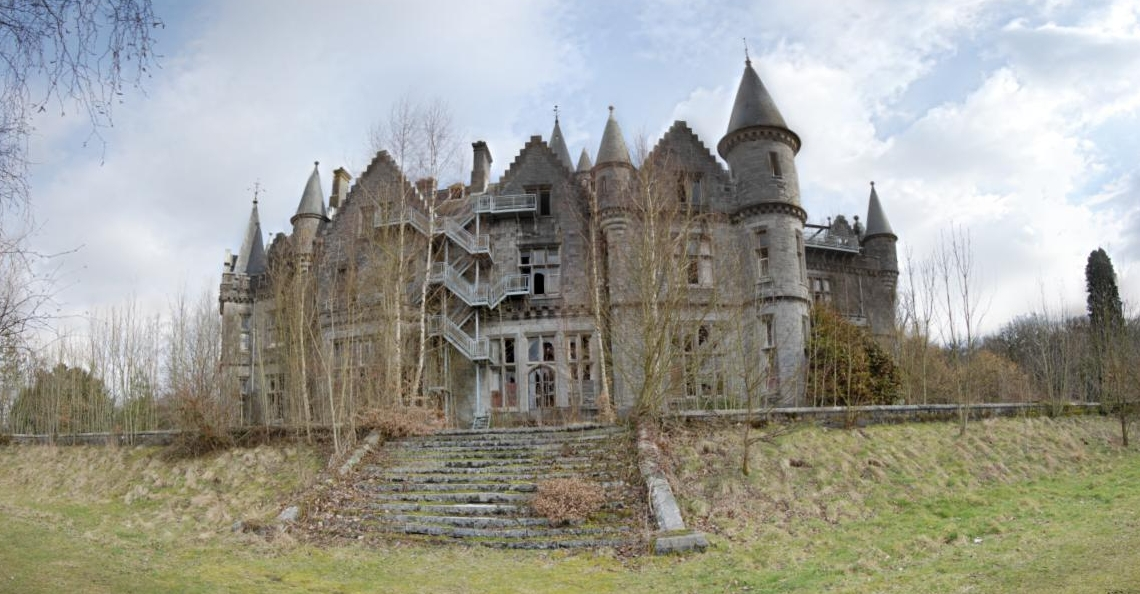
Rear of the château

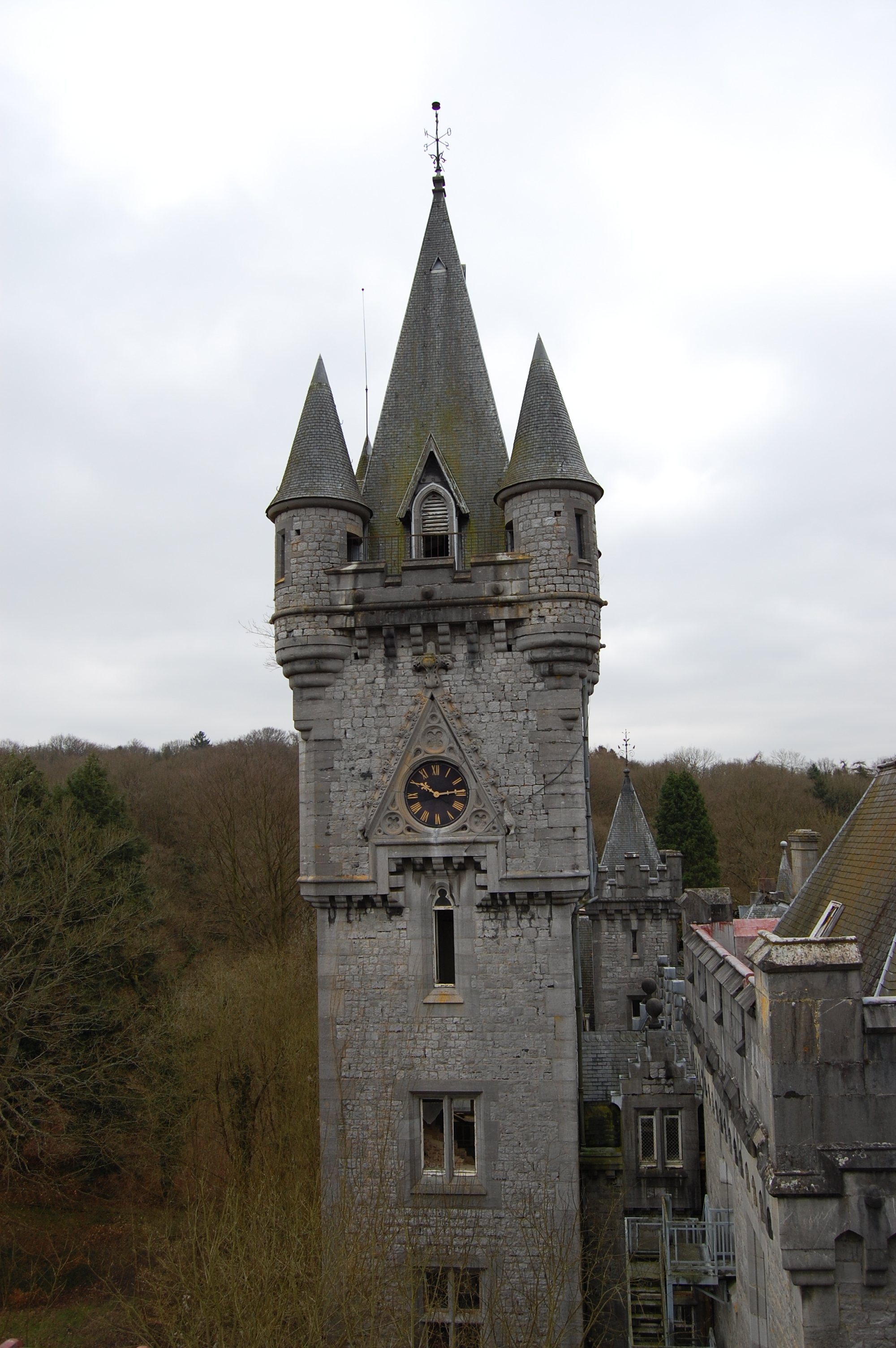
The 56-metre (184 ft) high clock tower

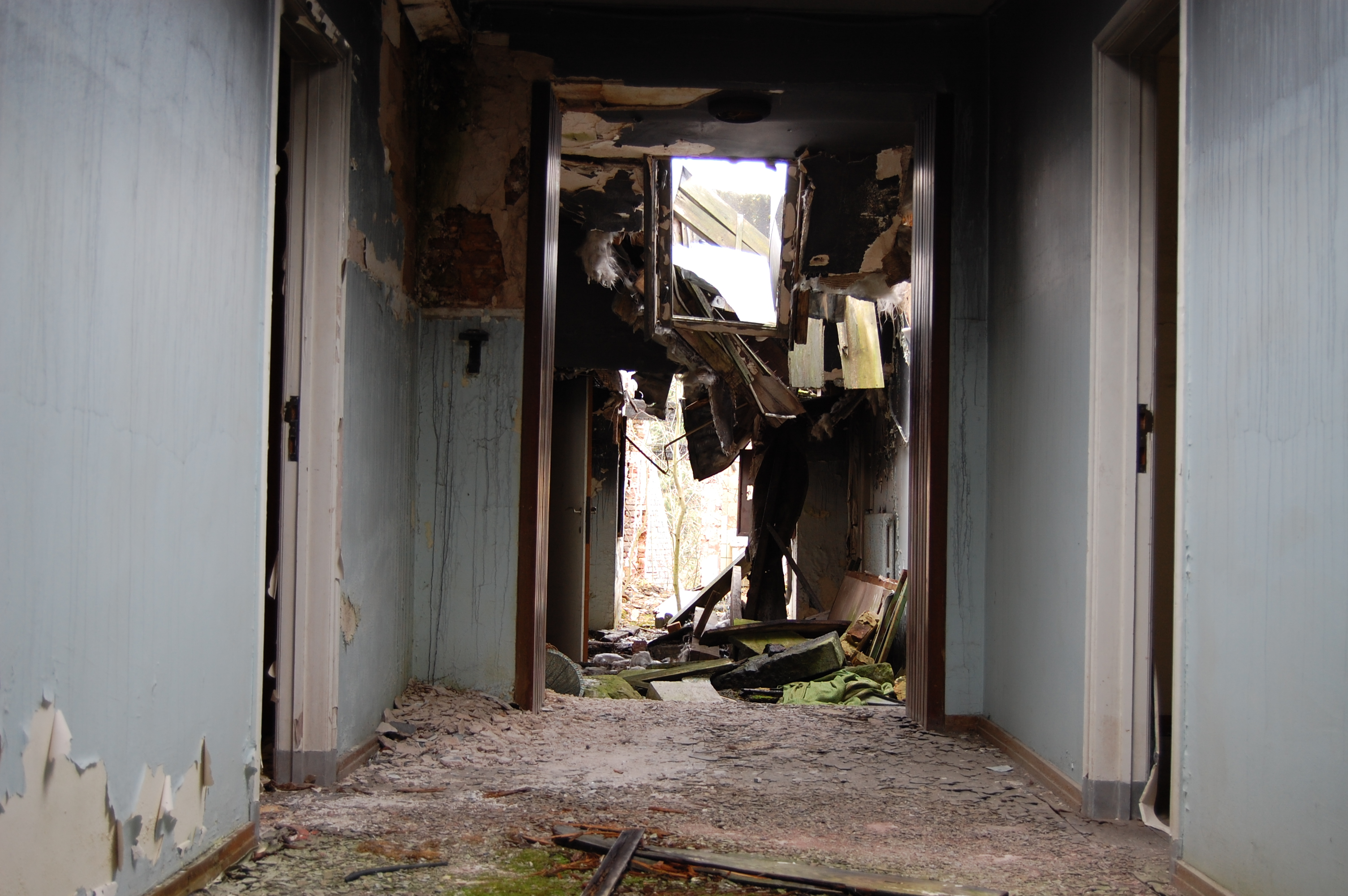
The top (4th) floor shown almost entirely collapsed

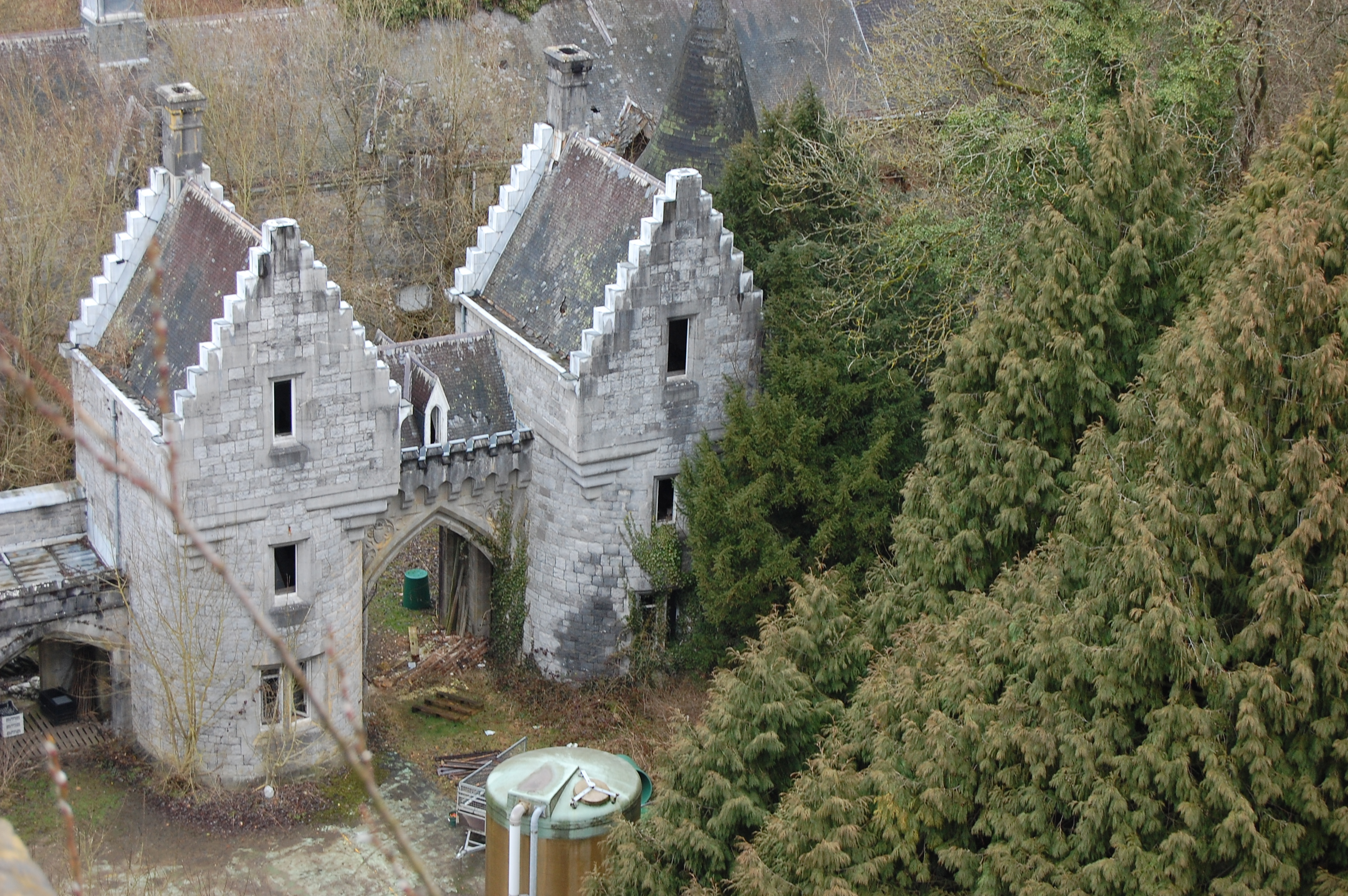
The entrance gate

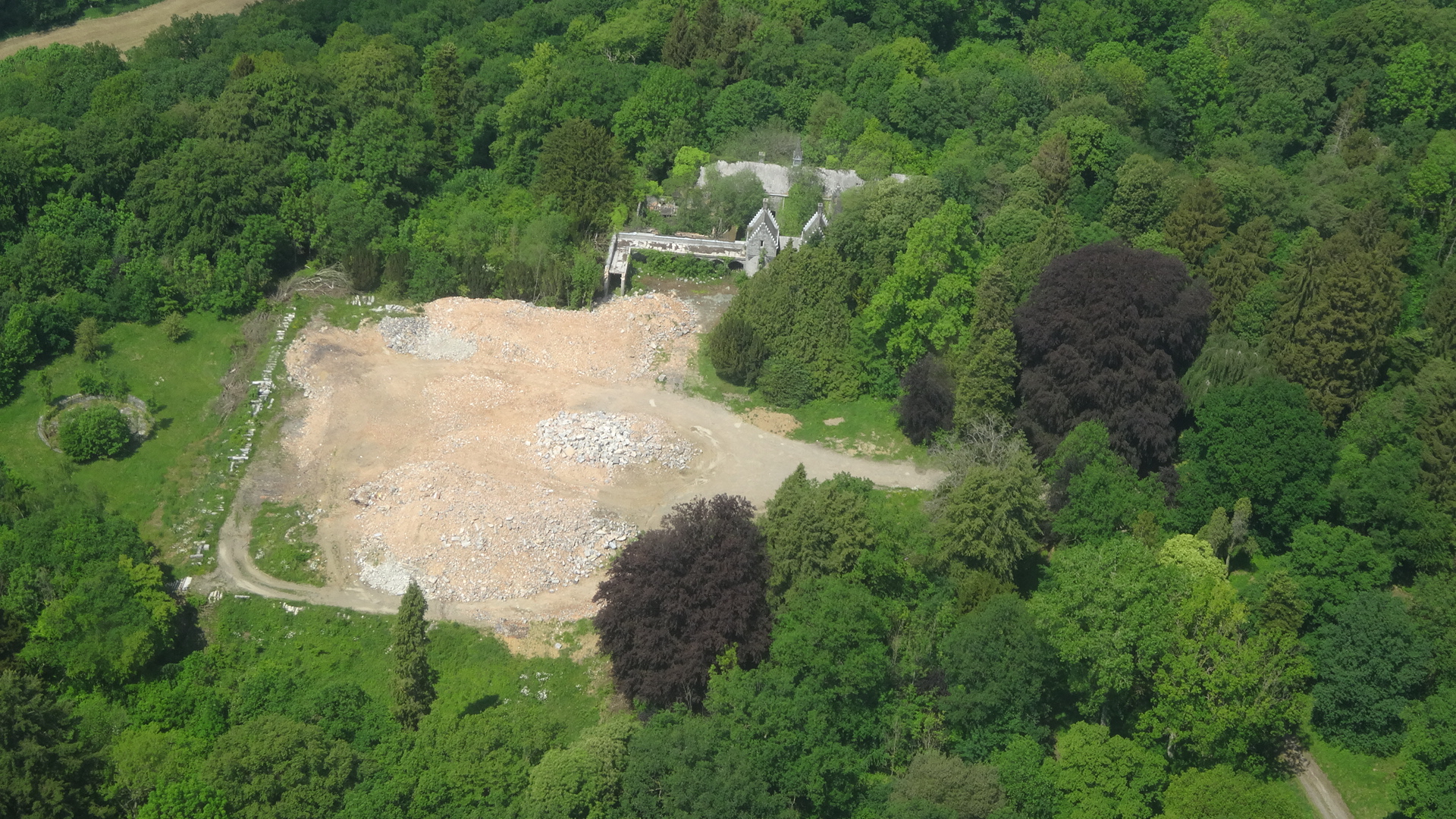
The site of the demolished castle

== See also ==
- List of castles in Belgium
