= List of protected heritage sites in Hastière =

This table shows an overview of the protected heritage sites in the Walloon town Hastière. This list is part of Belgium's national heritage.

Object	Year/architect	Town/section	Address	Coordinates	Number^{?}	Image
Abbey Church of Saint Peter ^{(nl)} ^{(fr)}		Hastière		50.214948°N 4.826993°E	91142-CLT-0001-01 Info	Kerk Saint-Pierre More images
water mill ^{(nl)} ^{(fr)}		Hastière	rue Larifosse 17, Hastière-par-delà	50.218219°N 4.824319°E	91142-CLT-0002-01 Info	
Freyr Castle and outbuildings and ensemble of castle, outbuildings, entire domain and its immediate surroundings ^{(nl)} ^{(fr)}		Hastière		50.226269°N 4.888978°E	91142-CLT-0008-01 Info	Kasteel Freyr en bijgebouwen en ensemble van kasteel, bijgebouwen, gehele domein en directe omgeving More images
Classic garden of the second half of the 18th century with its driveway, including 33 orange trees aged 300 years, and the source of Rochettes ^{(nl)} ^{(fr)}		Hastière		50.227787°N 4.887080°E	91142-CLT-0009-01 Info	Klassieke tuin van de tweede helft van de 18e eeuw met zijn toegangslaan, waaronder 33 sinaasappelbomen met een leeftijd van 300 jaar, en de bron van Rochettes
Rocks of Pauquys ^{(nl)} ^{(fr)}		Hastière		50.213712°N 4.865323°E	91142-CLT-0010-01 Info	
Site of "la Ranle", "les Traillis" and "les Cretiats" ^{(nl)} ^{(fr)}		Hastière		50.207154°N 4.881300°E	91142-CLT-0011-01 Info	Site van "la Ranle", "les Traillis" en "les Crétiats"
Rectory Saint-Michel: facades, roofs and enclosing garden wall ^{(nl)} ^{(fr)}		Hastière	rue du Charreau 134, Waulsort	50.205049°N 4.864508°E	91142-CLT-0012-01 Info	
Château de Halloy, old abbey walls and roofs, and ensemble of castle with its surroundings ^{(nl)} ^{(fr)}		Hastière	Waulsort	50.206748°N 4.867070°E	91142-CLT-0013-01 Info	Kasteel van Halloy, oude abdij: gevels en daken, en ensemble van kasteel met zijn omgeving More images
Rochers du Moniat ^{(nl)} ^{(fr)}		Hastière		50.242558°N 4.887366°E	91142-CLT-0014-01 Info	
Freyr Castle and outbuildings and ensemble of castle, outbuildings, entire domain and its immediate surroundings ^{(nl)} ^{(fr)}		Hastière		50.226269°N 4.888978°E	91142-PEX-0001-01 Info	Kasteel Freyr en bijgebouwen en ensemble van kasteel, bijgebouwen, gehele domein en directe omgeving More images
Classic garden of the Castle of Freÿr ^{(nl)} ^{(fr)}		Hastière		50.227787°N 4.887080°E	91142-PEX-0002-01 Info	Klassieke tuin van het kasteel van Freyr More images

== See also ==
- List of protected heritage sites in Namur (province)
