= Forannan =

Forannan, fl. c. 969, was Bishop of Donoughmore.

== Life ==
Forannan was born around 910 to an old noble family. His clan held the plain of Magh Feimhin, near Clonmel. He received an excellent upbringing and education, and became a Benedictine monk.

Forannan was chosen bishop by popular election, and consecrated, according to his 'Life,' in 'the city called in the barbarous dialect of the Irish Domhnach mor,' i.e. Donoughmore, which, it is added, is the metropolis of Ireland. From this Lanigan erroneously inferred it to have been in Armagh. But the 'Book of Leinster,' the 'Lebar Brecc,' and the 'Martyrology of Donegal' all term him of 'Donoughmore in Magh Feimhin,' the territory of his family.

== Departure from Ireland ==
In obedience to a vision directing him to go to the Meuse, Forannan, with twelve companions, left Ireland about 969, and, as usual with Irish saints, was miraculously conveyed across the sea.

It is possible that Forannan left Ireland as a peregrinus (a person who took an ascetic vow to live in exile) and he may have heard of the Irish connections of the monastery of Waulsort and decided to settle down there. While in search of the appointed place they met Count Eilbert, who had built many churches, and among them one dedicated to St. Patrick. He then led them to Rome, that they might obtain the instruction in monastic learning which they sought for. There Forannan received the episcopal dignity and the title of abbot; he was ordered to turn aside for further instruction in the Benedictine rule to Gorze Abbey.

Thence he went to Waulsort Abbey, between Dinant and Givet. The pious emperor Otto heard of his fame, and, after some hesitation in acknowledging Forannan's rank, took the abbey under his protection. Waulsort had been founded in 945 by Eilbert, and an Irish monk, Macculind, who became the first abbot. Macculind, on leaving Ireland, had first gone to Peronne, the monastery founded by Eorcenwald, and there won the patronage of Hersendis, the wife of Count Eilbert. Walciodorus was one of a group of such monasteries supplied with monks from Ireland.

By Forannan's influence a place called Hasteria (now Hastière) was added to his monastery. He also obtained a village called Gruthen, which he made over to the monastery, in order that its vineyards might supply the monks with wine. Several interpretations of the name Waulsort/Walciodorus have been proposed; some taking it to be from 'vallis decora,' the beautiful valley, others from 'waltz-dor,' the torrent of the wood. Seven years after his arrival Count Eilbert died. He was attended during his illness by Forannan, and was buried in the Basilica of Walciodorus. Forannan died in 982.

His day is 30 April. Saint Forannan is invoked against toothache, and rabies.
