= Saint Hadelin =

Belgian saint

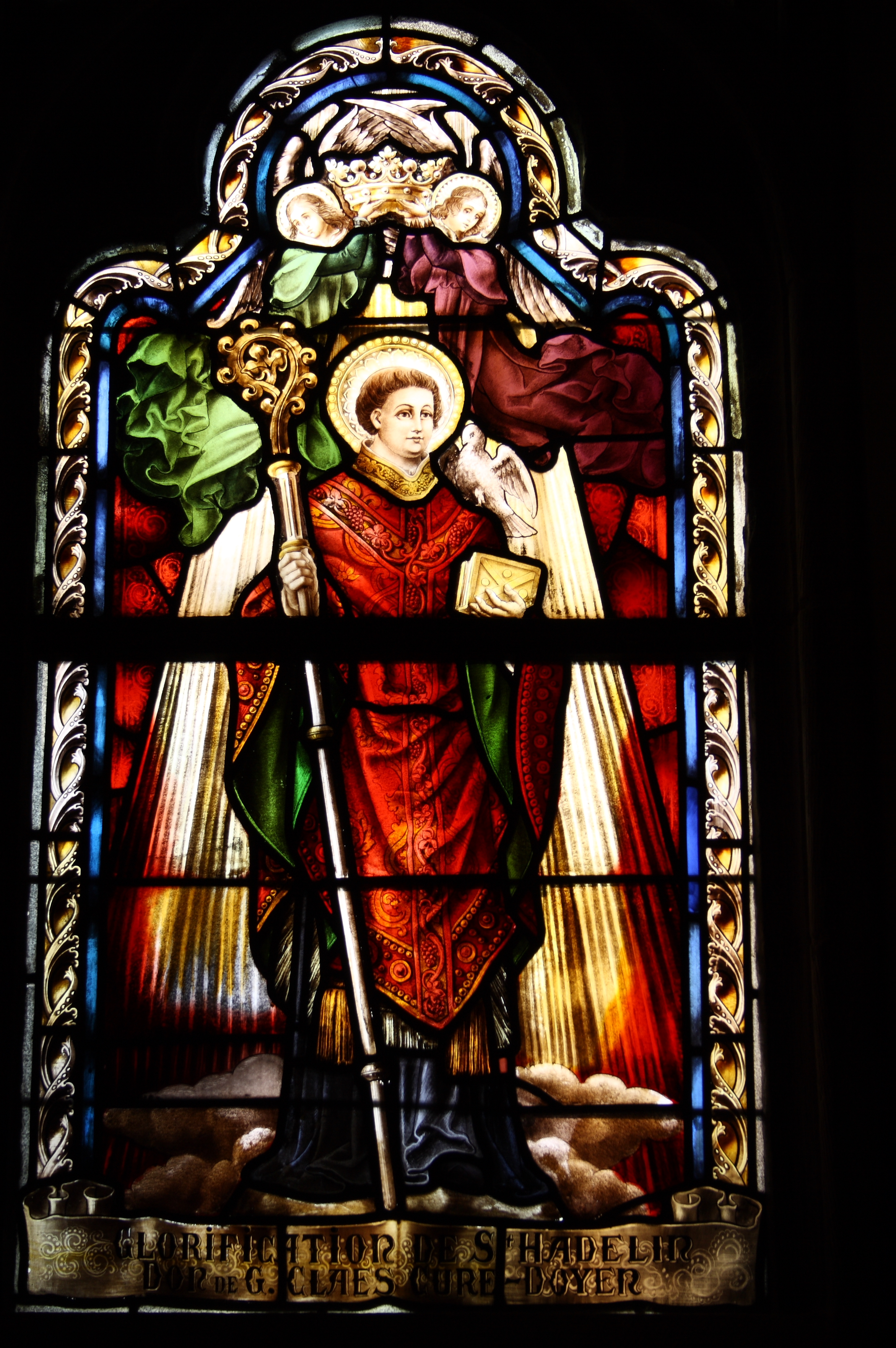
Hadelin, l'église St. Martin, Visé

Saint Hadelin (or Adelin, Hadelinus; died c. 690), born in Guyenne, was one of the scholarly monks who preached Christianity and started conversion work in what is now Belgium, along with Saint Remaclus.

== Life ==
Of noble parentage, Hadelin lived at the court of Sigebert of Austrasia. He then became a student of Remaclus first at Solignac Abbey, and then at Cougnon abbey, in the duchy of Luxemburg. Later he moved to Stavelot Abbey, founded by Remaclus in 650.

Around 651, Remaclus became bishop of Maastricht and brought Hadelin with him. In 669, with the help of Remaclus and Pepin of Herstal, he founded the monastery of Celles in the surroundings of Dinant. He later founded a monastery at Visé. Hadelin eventually retired to live as a hermit near Dinant, where he died around 690.

== Veneration ==
Hadelin is especially venerated in the Walloon diocese of Namur, as founder of the monastery of Celles. He is the patron of Celles, where he is celebrated on the Sunday following the Nativity of the Blessed Virgin (September 8). A silver-made shrine in the Mosan style, can be found in Visé, Belgium. Hadalinus is invoked against children's ailments; in iconography his attribute is a dove.

His liturgical feast is on February 3.

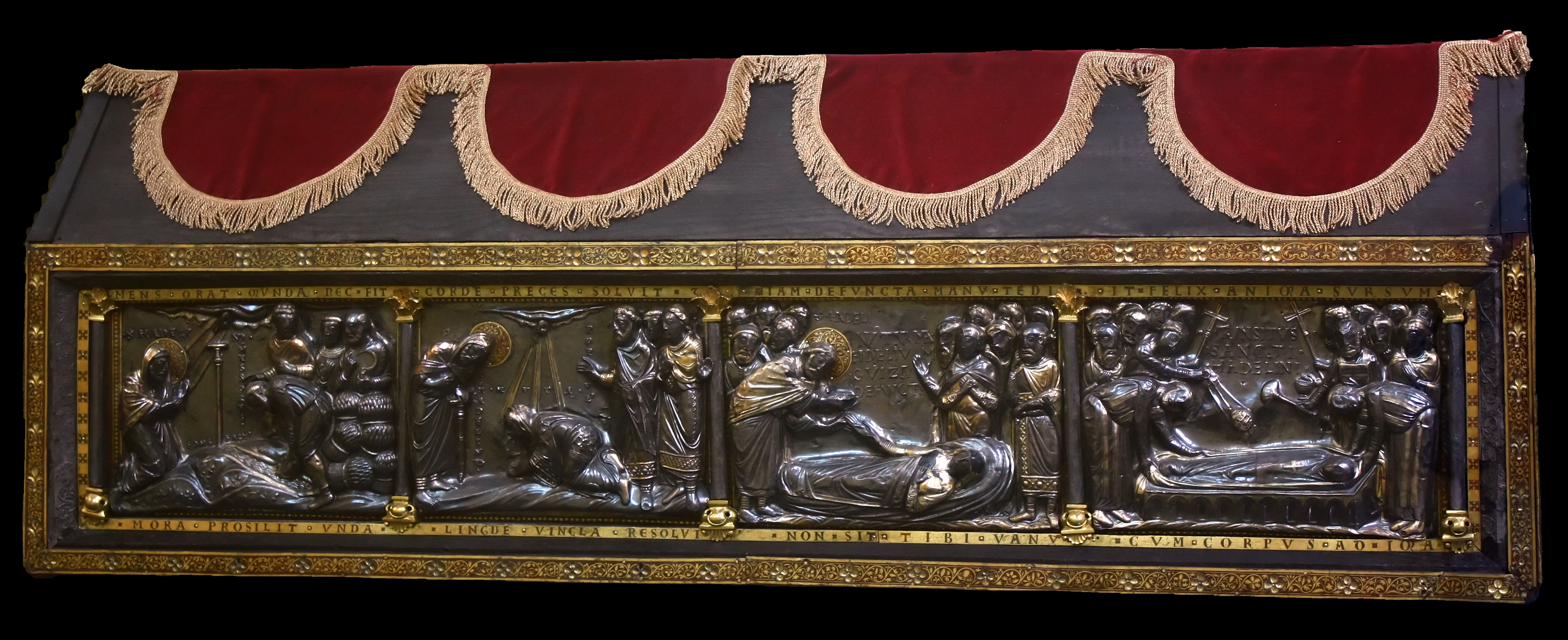
Shrine of Saint-Hadelin located in the Saint-Martin church in Visé, Belgium.

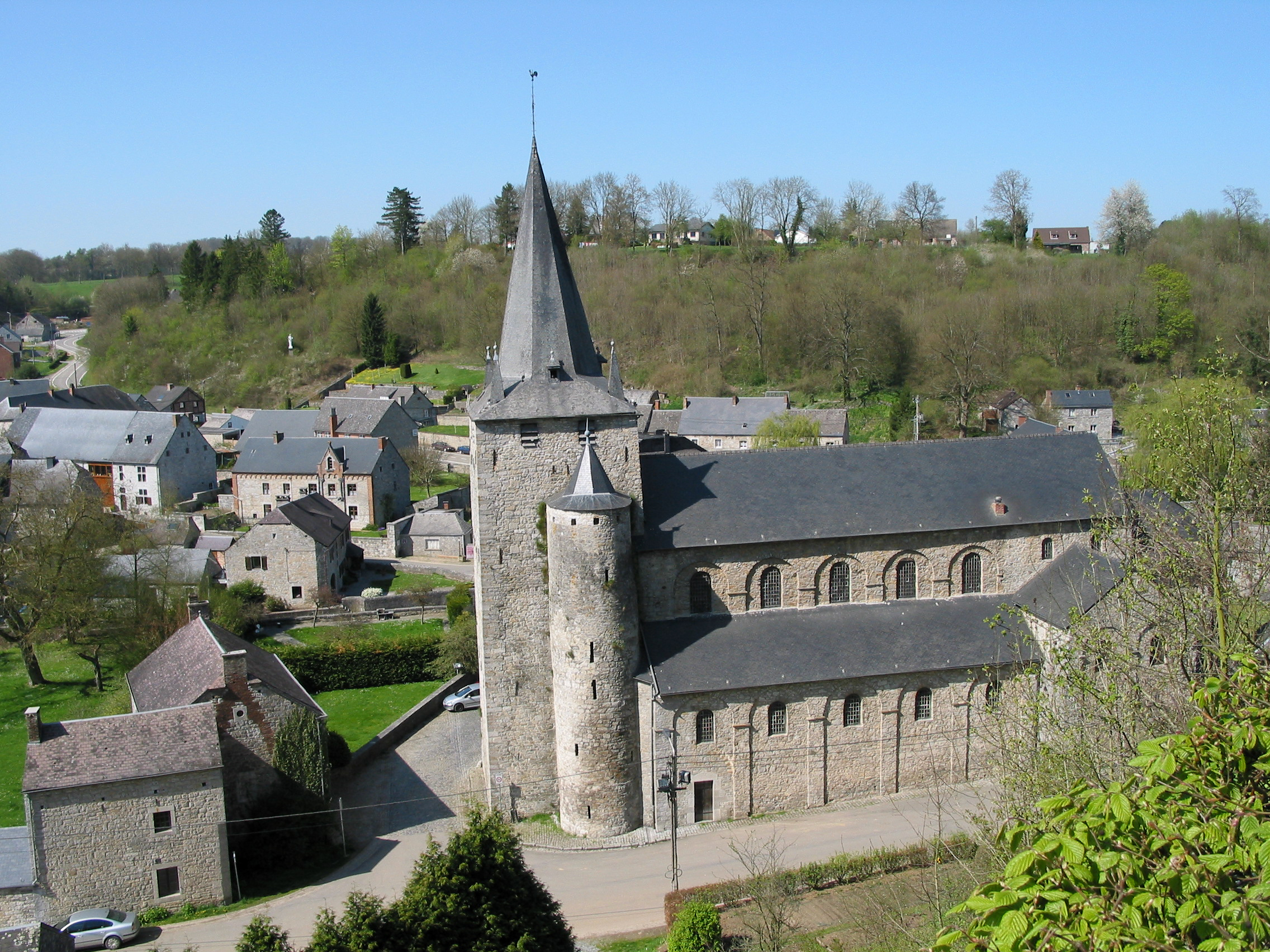
Collegiate Church of Saint Hadelin in Celles, Belgium

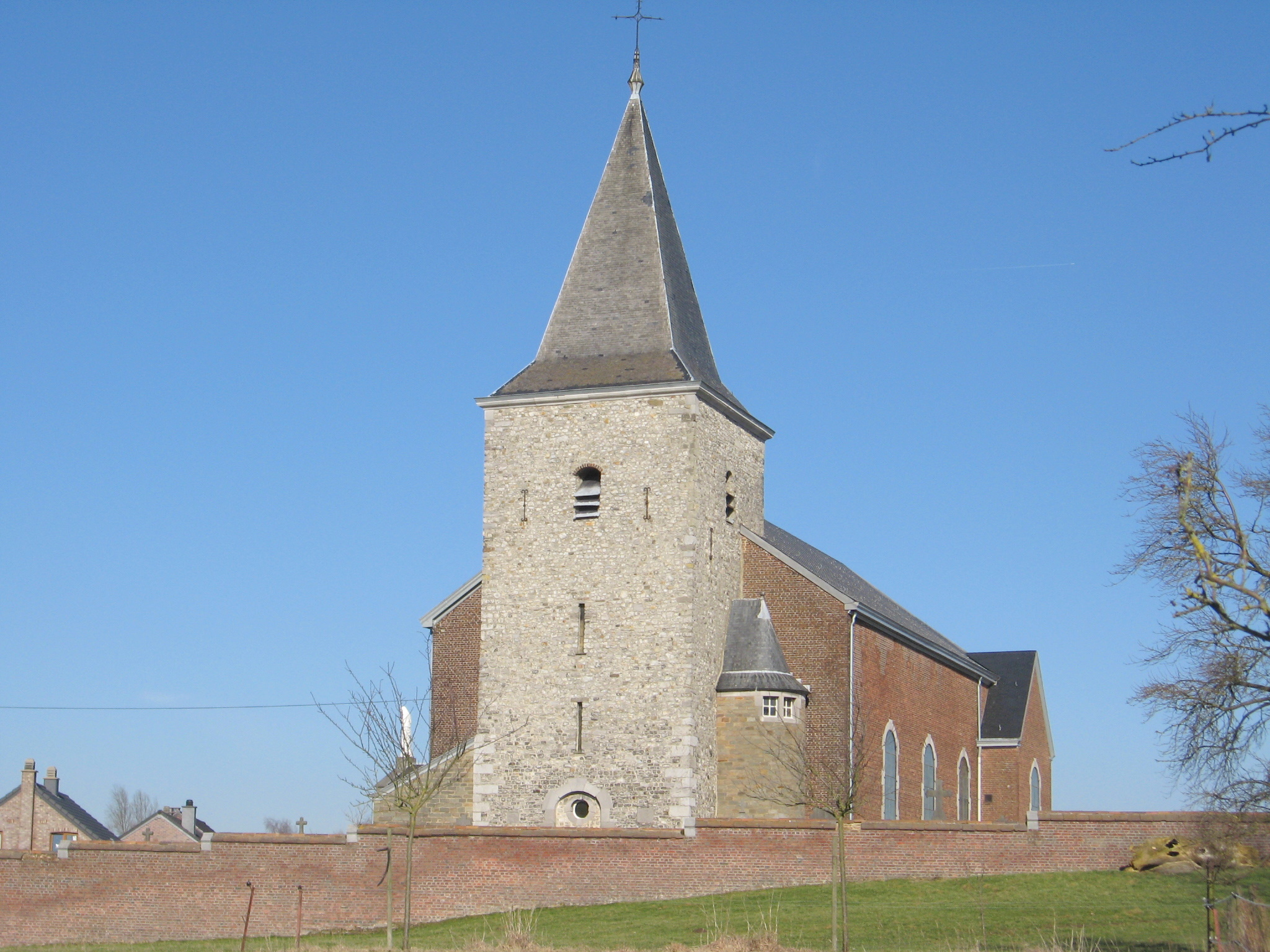
Eglise Saint-Hadelin, Remicourt

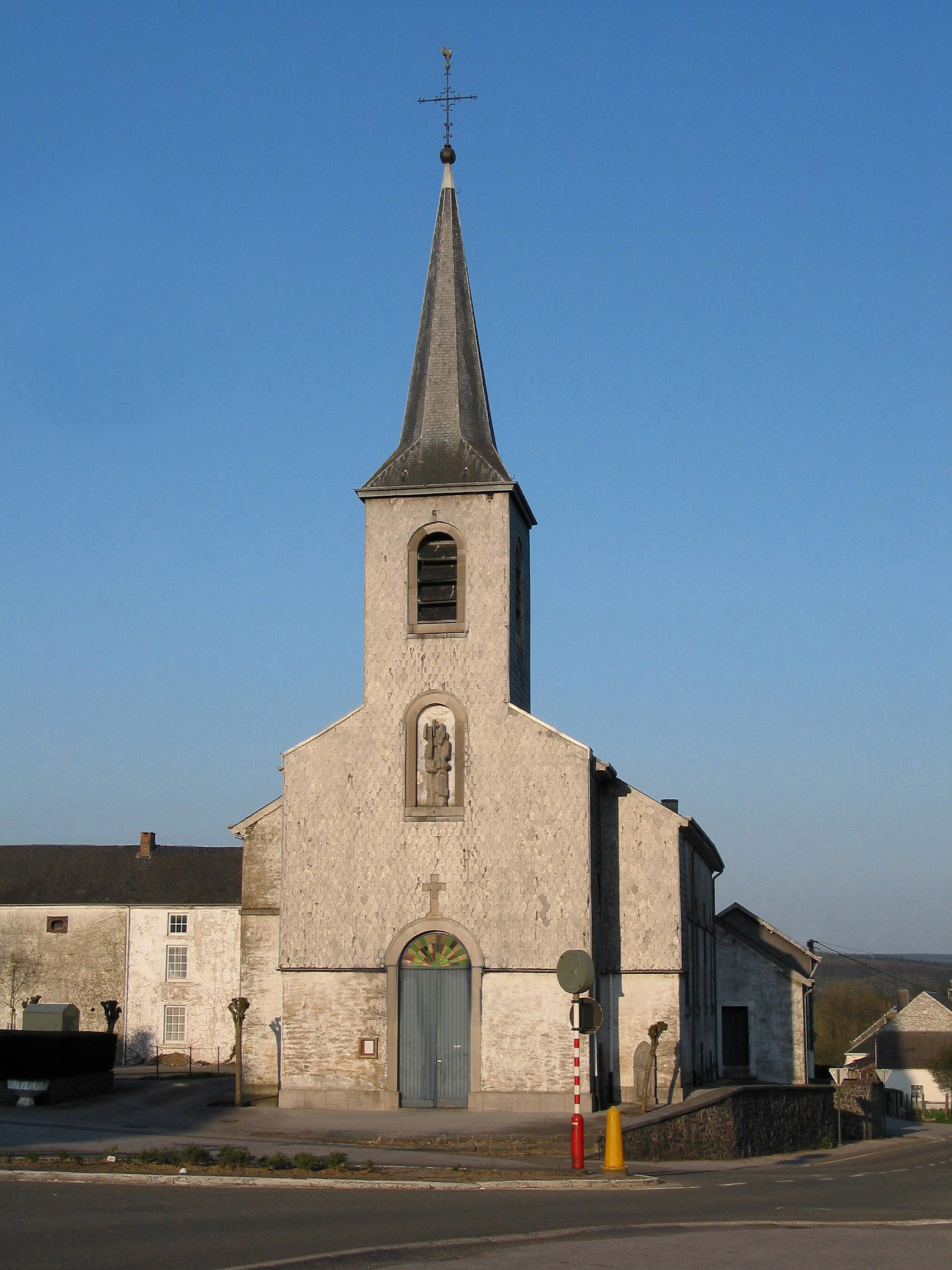
Eglise Saint-Hadelin, Maissin

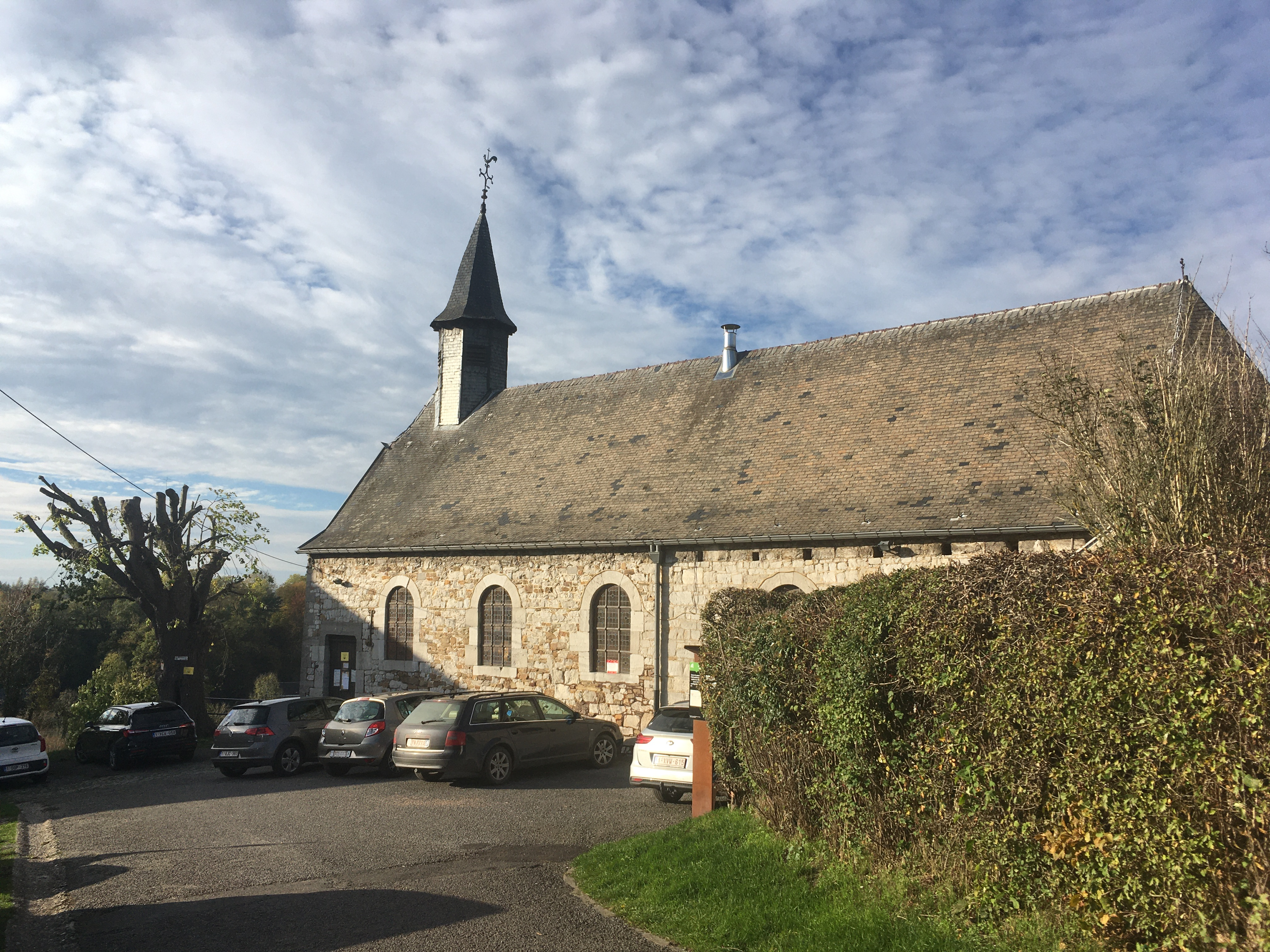
Sint-Hadelinuskerk, Saint-Hadelin

== See also ==
- Saint Servatius
