= Abbey Church of Saint Peter, Hastière =

Church in Hastière, Belgium

Coordinates: 50°12′54″N 04°49′36″E

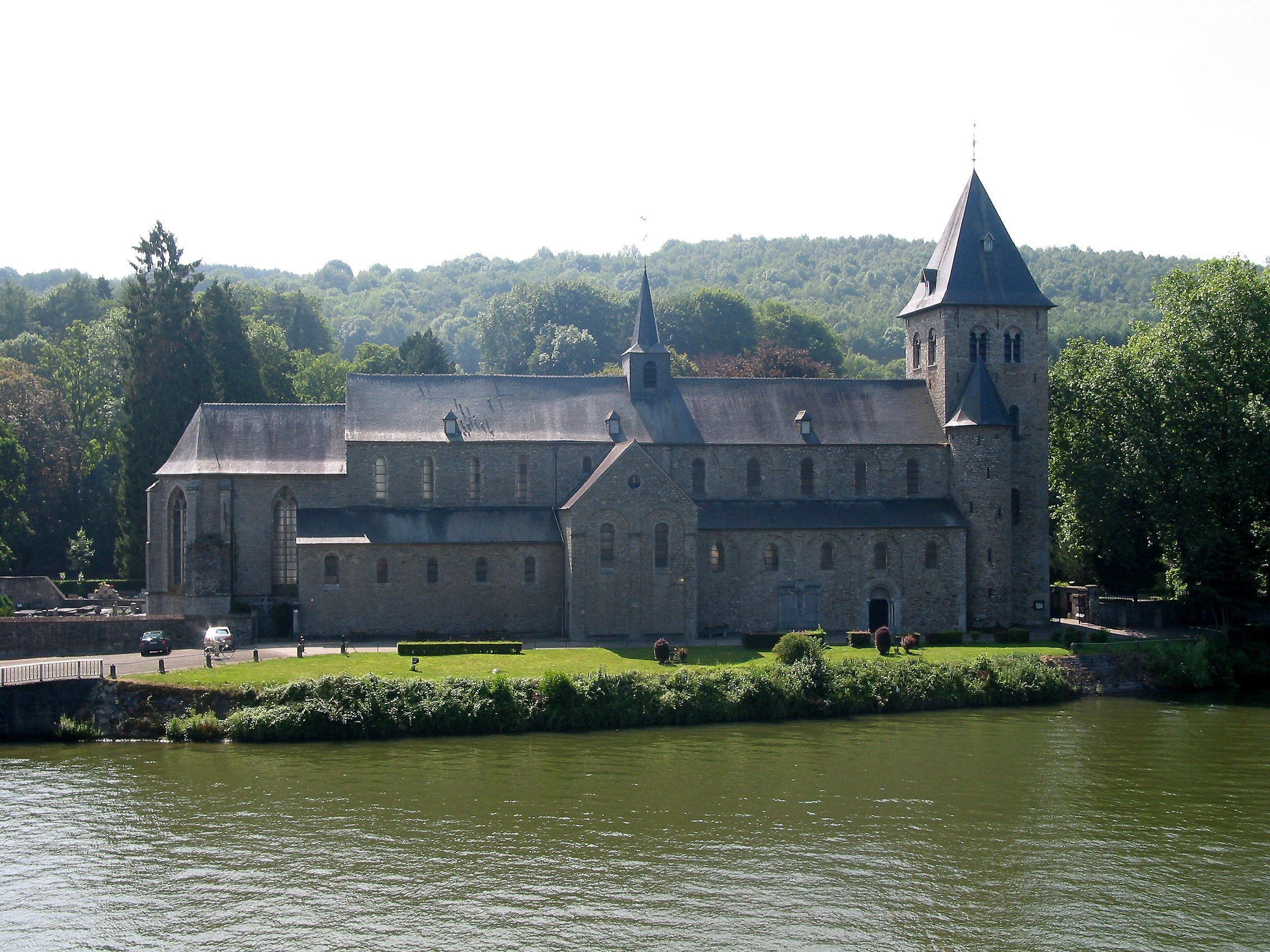
Abbey Church of Saint Peter, Hastière

The Abbey Church of Saint Peter (French: Église abbatiale Saint-Pierre d'Hastière) is a well-preserved Romanesque church in Hastière, Belgium. It was built c. 1033–1035, but traces its history back to the 900s. From 969 until the French Revolution, it was a priory under Waulsort Abbey. Since 1912 it serves as a parish church.

== History ==
The church traces its history back to a Benedictine monastery, founded in this location around the year 900 by Wigeric of Lotharingia. In 969 it was united with Waulsort Abbey and reduced to the status of a priory. The priory was disbanded during the French Revolution. In 1901, the parish was re-established and the church re-inaugurated as the parish church in 1912.

The currently visible church was built c. 1033–1035. In the 1260s, the original chancel was demolished and replaced with the currently visible, Gothic chancel. The church was damaged in 1793. Between 1882 and 1909 restoration works were carried out to plans by architect Auguste Van Assche, who had parts of the tower and the nave renewed. In 1882, the Romanesque crypt was also discovered under the chancel; it was restored by architect Chrétien Veraart. Following damage during World War II, the church was renovated again.

== Architecture ==
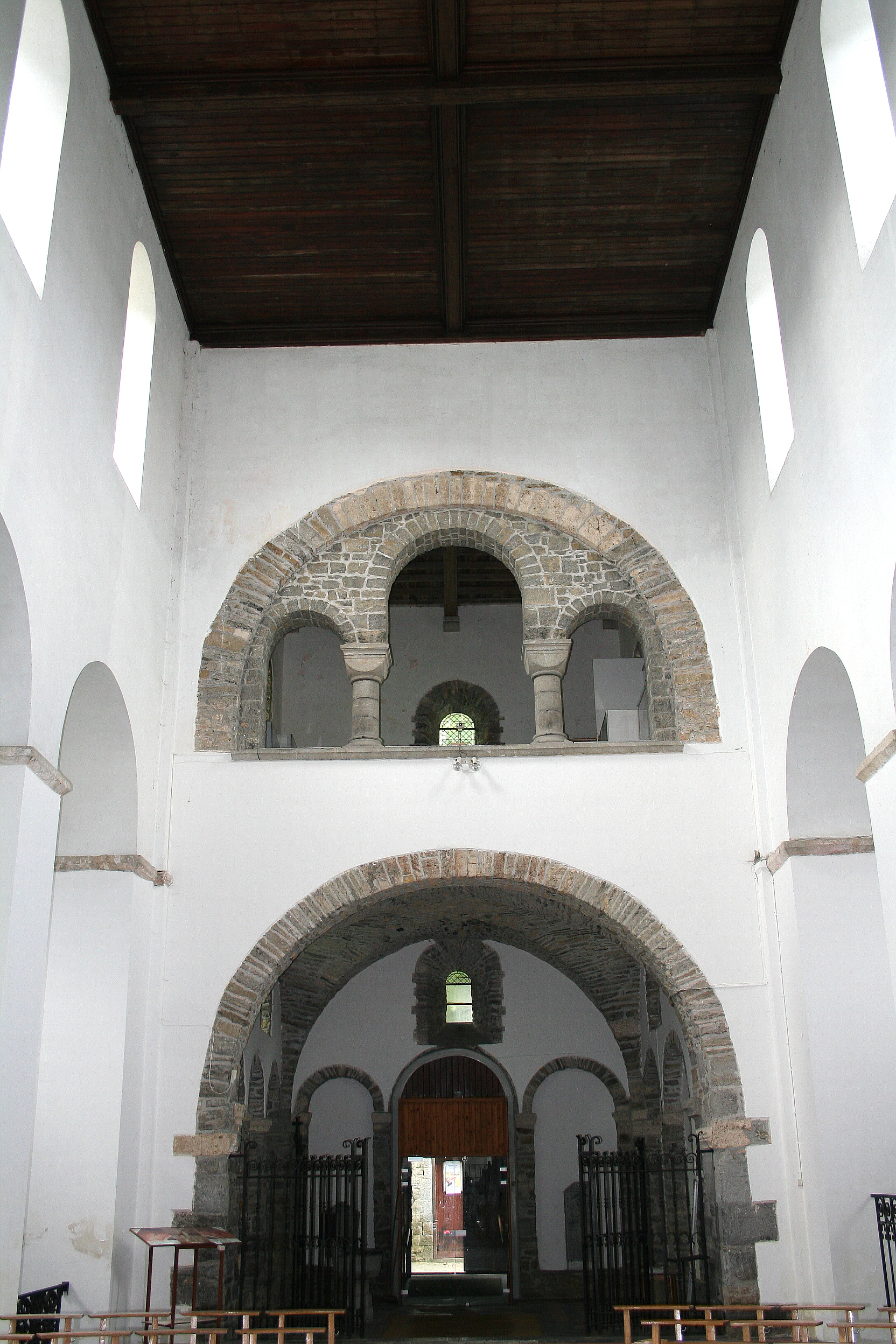
Interior view towards the west, with the Romanesque tribune visible

From the outset, the church had a western tower (since heavily rebuilt), a nave and two aisles five bays long, a transept and a chancel with an apse. It retains much of its original plan, with the exception of the chancel which was replaced by the current three-sided Gothic structure with lancet windows in the 13th century. Originally, the ground floor of the tower, open to the nave, also contained a chancel which could be used for celebrating mass; an unusual feature particular for churches influenced by the architecture of the former Saint Lambert's Cathedral in Liège, which had a "counter-chancel" in its west end. A peculiarity is also the tribune on the first floor of the tower, open to the nave through three arches. During the Middle Ages an altar dedicated to Saint Michael was displayed here. Overall, the church displays strict geometrical volumes.

Together with the Collegiate Church of Saint Hadelin in Celles, Houyet, the church is one of the best examples of Belgian Romanesque churches built with clear inspiration from Saint Lambert's Cathedral in Liège.

Among the furnishings of the church, the Gothic choir stalls with decorated misericords date from 1443. The baptismal font is also from the late Middle Ages, dated to the 14th or 15th century. The stoup is older, from the 13th century. The rood with John the Evangelist and Mary is from the 15th century.
