= Collegiate Church of Saint Hadelin =

Coordinates: 50°13′44″N 05°00′29″E

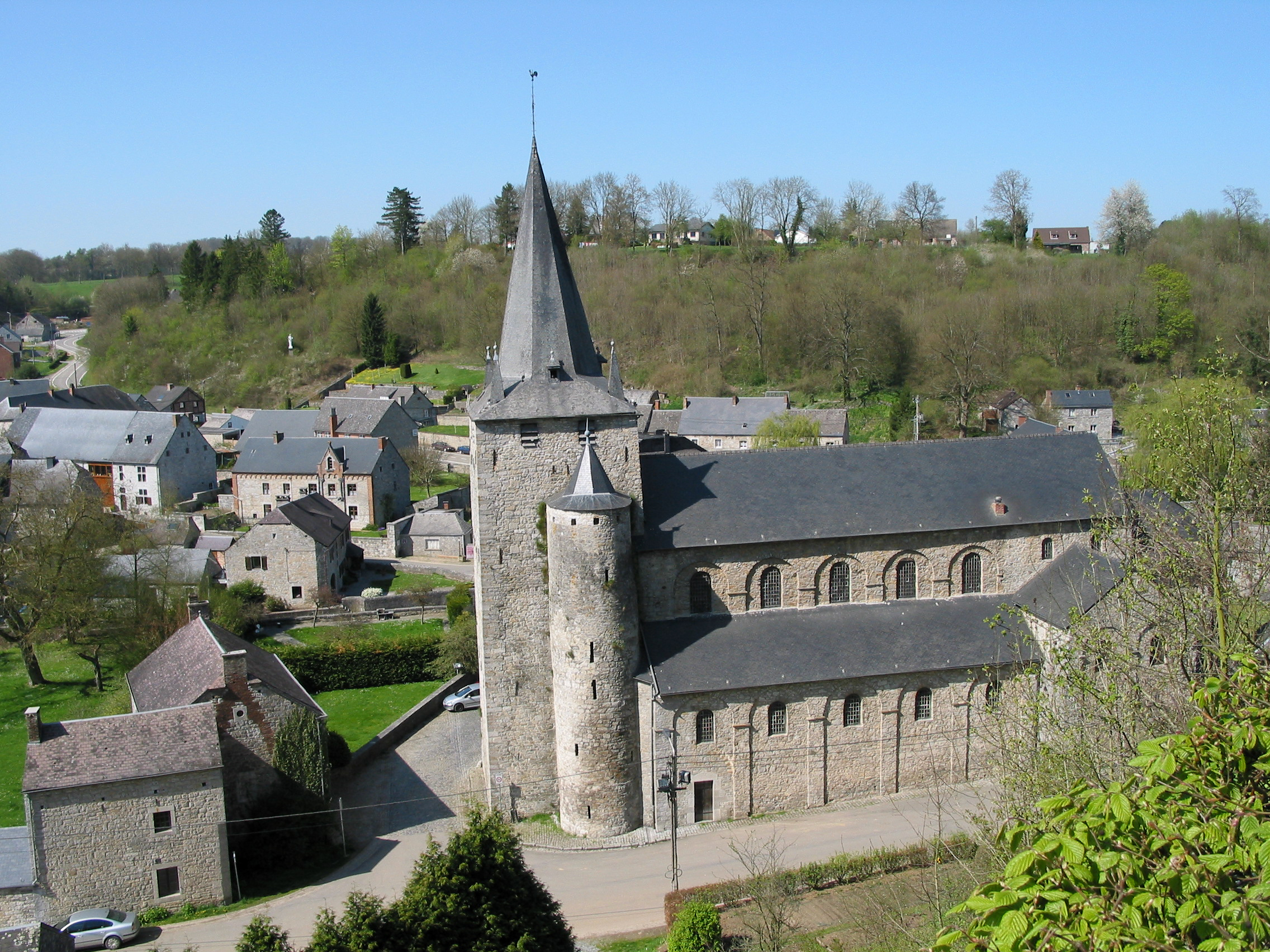
The Collegiate Church of Saint Hadelin in Celles

The Collegiate Church of Saint Hadelin (French: Collégiale Saint-Hadelin de Celles) is a former collegiate church in Celles, a village and district of the municipality of Houyet, in the province of Namur, Belgium. It is traditionally believed to have been founded by Saint Hadelin in the 7th century, though the currently visible church dates from the 11th century when a major reconstruction effort was made. It has remained largely unaltered since then.

== History ==
Tradition holds that Saint Hadelin founded an oratory in Celles in the 7th century. After his death, the worship of his relics developed into a pilgrimage site. Remains of a Pre-Romanesque church have been found by archaeologists on the site of the currently visible church. A stone carrying an inscription in Latin from the time of the Emperor Probus is preserved in the church.

The church was rebuilt during the early 11th century, and was then also transformed into a collegiate church. It was built around the same time as the Abbey Church of Saint Peter in Hastière, with which it also shares several similarities. Artistic influence for both churches were derived, in a reduced scale, from the large building projects initiated in Liège during the rule of Notker of Liège as Prince-Bishopric of Liège. The Collegiate Church of Saint Hadelin has only been lightly changed since its 11th-century reconstruction. The tower was rebuilt at the end of the 16th century, and the church was lightly restored twice during the 19th century, in 1857–1859 and in 1869–1871.

== Description ==
Exterior view from the north-east

The Collegiate Church of Saint Hadelin is a well-preserved and homogenous Romanesque building, representative for Mosan architecture of the first half of the 11th century. The interior is divided into a nave, five bays long, with parallel aisles, a low transept and three semi-circular apses. The western tower is massive in relation to the rest of the building, and together with the two flanking turrets form a Romanesque westwork. Remains of a shallow crypt are discernible in the base of the tower, which also houses a counter-choir with an altar, and in the east a well-preserved crypt lies under the chancel. The eastern crypt originally contained an elaborate reliquary of Saint Hadelin, today preserved in the Collegiate Church of Saint Martin and Saint Hadelin in Visé. The church is not elaborately decorated. The exterior of the windows are surmounted by arches that in their prolongation form lesenes reaching the base of the church, creating a horizontal rhythm. Inside, the choir stalls, the baptismal font and the holy water font are all medieval; the church also contains wooden sculptures of several saints from the 14th and 15th centuries, as well as stained glass from around 1600.

== Sources cited ==
- Barral i Altet, Xavier (1989). Belgique Romane (in French). Zodiaque. ISBN 2-7369-0166-5.
- Leclercq-Marx, Jacqueline (1997). L'art Roman en Belgique (in French). Braine-l'Alleud: J.-M. Collet. OCLC 40595503.
- Menne, Gilbert, ed. (2014). Le grand guide de Wallonie et de Bruxelles (in French). Brussels: Racine. ISBN 978-94-014-1418-0.
