= Waulsort =

Waulsort Åssôrt (Walloon)
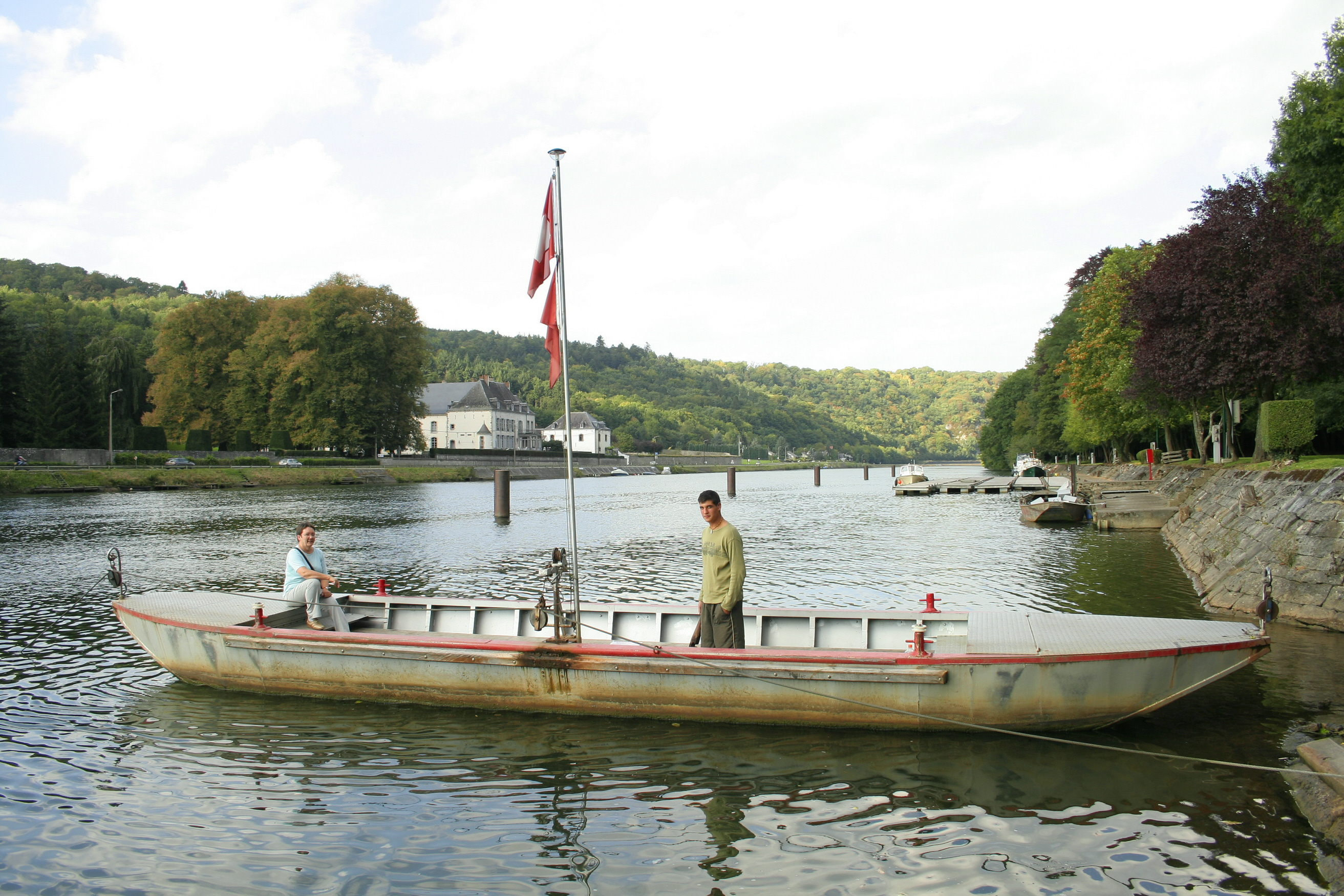
- A boat on the Meuse in Waulsort
- Interactive map of Waulsort
- Coordinates: 50°12′0″N 04°41′0″E
- Country: Belgium
- Region: Wallonia
- Province: Namur
- Municipality: Hastière
- Postal code: 5540
- Area code: 082

Waulsort (Walloon: Åssôrt) is a village of Wallonia and a district of the municipality of Hastière, located in the province of Namur, Belgium.

Until the reorganisation of the Municipalities of Belgium 1977, Waulsort was a municipality in its own right.

== History ==
The Benedictine Waulsort Abbey was founded here in 946. It was dissolved in 1793, during the French Revolution. It was chiefly known as the owner, from the 10th century until its dissolution, of the Lothar Crystal.

== Geography ==
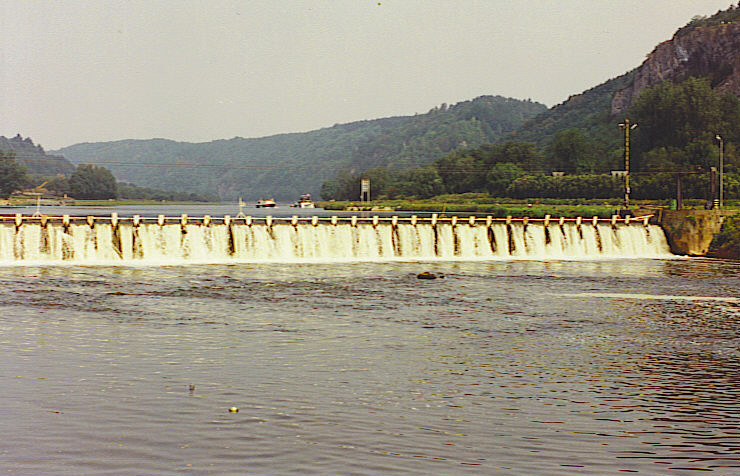
The Barrage at Waulsort

Waulsort is on the river Meuse and is the location of a weir with a by-pass lock. 50.199983°N 4.819689°E

== See also ==
- Waulsortian mudmound
