= Waulsortian mudmound =

Geographical feature formed in warm tropical waters

A Waulsortian mudmound is a calcareous geographical feature found in Early Carboniferous strata of Central Europe. It is a type of fossil-rich bioconstruction, formed by microbial activity in deep tropical waters during the mid-Dinantian (late Tournaisian to early Viséan geological age). Mud mounds are a type of high-relief biologically-mediated seafloor deposit, similar to a reef. Unlike a true reef, a mud mound is composed almost entirely of uncemented mud-sized matrix grains, and the isolated fossils do not form a significant skeletal framework.

Waulsortian mudmounds in particular are unbedded, micritic limestone, heavily jointed with calcite veining. There is some galena and sphalerite mineralisation in the joints. The fossils are mainly crinoid ossicles and fenestellid bryozoans, together with gastropods and brachiopods.

The term Waulsortian was first used in 1863 to describe an area of limestone near Waulsort in Namur, Belgium. Similar mudstone was recognised in the Clitheroe area of Lancashire England by Arthur Vaughan in 1916.

== Formation ==
On a firm bed of limestone, under the deep waters of the tropical sea, crinoids fixed themselves to the rock. The oceans gentle currents eroded the base rock creating a lime-rich mud which was propelled by the current. Where the water was too rapid, the crinoids were displaced, but where it was slower they formed a barrier which arrested the mud forming a micritic deposit. Further crinoids attached themselves, and the deposit thickened to an eventual depth of 200m. In the mudmound one finds fossils of the crinoids bone structure and the angle of deposit shows the direction and speed of mudflow.

== Clitheroe reef belt ==
There has been much debate on how the low micritic limestone hills in the Craven Basin were formed, one theory led to them being called reef knolls, knoll reefs, or bioherms but work in 1972 by Miller & Grayson identified them as mud mounds with the same fossil content as those near Waulsort. They include accessible geological sites at Clitheroe Castle, Salthill and Bellman quarries, Crow Hill and Worsaw, Gerna and Sykes.
