= Salthill Quarry =

Nature reserve in Lancashire, England

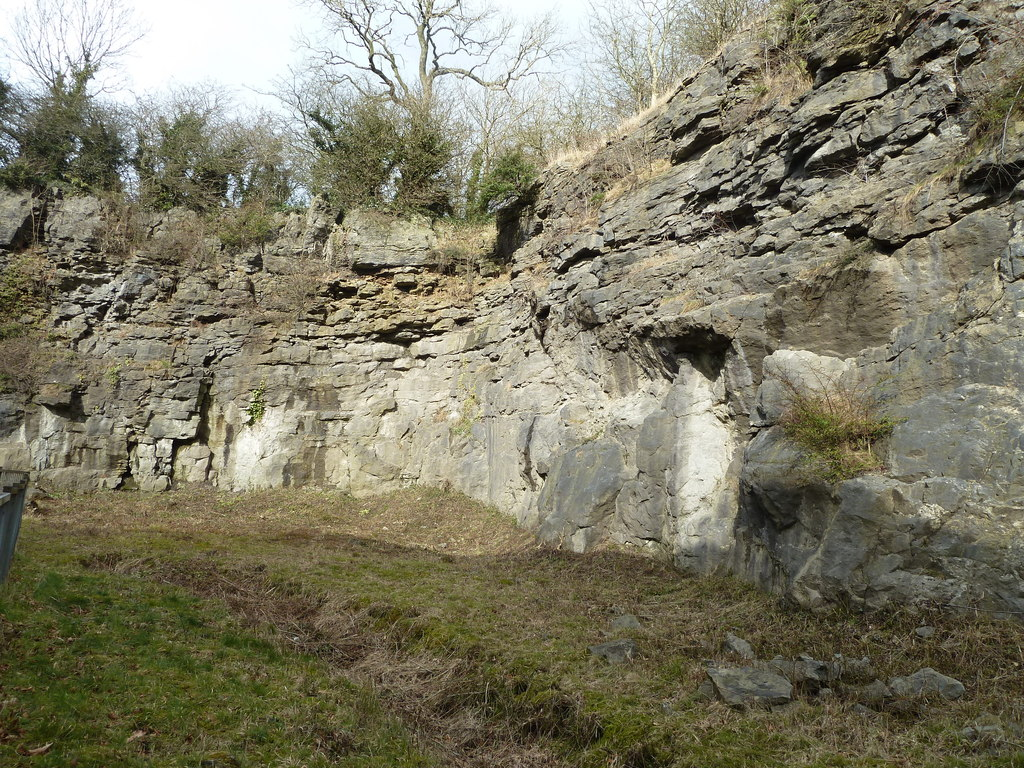
- Limestone wall of Salthill Quarry

- Location within Lancashire
- OS grid: SD 755 426
- Coordinates: 53.87926°N 2.37216°W
- Area: 8 hectares (20 acres)
- Operator: Wildlife Trust for Lancashire, Manchester and North Merseyside
- Designation: Local nature reserve Site of Special Scientific Interest
- Website: www.lancswt.org.uk/nature-reserves/salthill-quarry-local-nature-reserve

Salthill Quarry is a nature reserve of the Wildlife Trust for Lancashire, Manchester and North Merseyside, near Clitheroe in Lancashire. It is a local nature reserve and a Site of Special Scientific Interest, notable as a site of fossilised remains of crinoids.

== History ==
The site is next to an industrial estate. The draft document for the Geology Trail at Salthill Quarry was published by the Nature Conservancy Council in 1979, and this prevented probable development of the site. It was designated a local nature reserve in 1989.

== Geology ==
The area lay at the bottom of the ocean during the Carboniferous period, and there are fossilised remains of crinoids in the Carboniferous limestone. The palaeontologist Stephen Donovan has written that Clitheroe "is probably the best area to collect fossil crinoids of any age in England." The site also contains a Waulsortian mudmound. There is a Geology Trail: a circular walk in which ten locations each have a numbered post, where a QR code can be scanned by a smartphone to obtain a description of features there. (Hammering limestone is discouraged in the nature reserve.)

At the top of a bank is the Crinoid Seat, created by Fiona Bowley and Jon Fenton, featuring carved panels depicting crinoids.

== Wildlife ==
During the summer there is bird's foot trefoil, common knapweed, lady’s bedstraw, agrimony. meadow sweet and rough hawkbit. There is woodland, mainly of ash and hawthorn.

Butterflies and birds can be seen including common blue butterflies, orange-tip butterflies, goldfinches, bullfinches, blue tits and great tits.

== Access ==
There are footpaths around the site, with some steps at the southern end of the reserve.
