= List of protected heritage sites in Houyet =

This table shows an overview of the protected heritage sites in the Walloon town Houyet. This list is part of Belgium's national heritage.

Object	Year/architect	Town/section	Address	Coordinates	Number^{?}	Image
Centuries-old oak tree situated on the spot called "Petite Couture" ^{(nl)} ^{(fr)}		Houyet		50.177639°N 5.015453°E	91072-CLT-0002-01 Info	
Church of Saint Hadelin ^{(nl)} ^{(fr)}		Houyet		50.228930°N 5.008208°E	91072-CLT-0003-01 Info	Kerk Saint-Hadelin
Castle of Vêves ^{(nl)} ^{(fr)}		Houyet		50.220808°N 4.982484°E	91072-CLT-0004-01 Info	Kasteel van Vêves
Ensemble of the castle of Vêves and surrounding area ^{(nl)} ^{(fr)}		Houyet		50.218861°N 4.976938°E	91072-CLT-0005-01 Info	
Tower of the Church of St. Clement ^{(nl)} ^{(fr)}		Houyet		50.157756°N 4.945310°E	91072-CLT-0007-01 Info	
Aiguilles de Chaleux ^{(nl)} ^{(fr)}		Houyet		50.221557°N 4.950505°E	91072-CLT-0008-01 Info	Aiguilles de Chaleux
Aiguilles de Chaleux: extension of the site ^{(nl)} ^{(fr)}		Houyet		50.218322°N 4.951200°E	91072-CLT-0009-01 Info	
Chapel of Saint-Roch and the ensemble of the building and its surroundings ^{(nl)} ^{(fr)}		Houyet		50.189790°N 5.004180°E	91072-CLT-0010-01 Info	
Totality of the chapel of Notre-Dame de Grâce and the ensemble of the chapel and its surroundings ^{(nl)} ^{(fr)}		Houyet		50.153610°N 5.031649°E	91072-CLT-0011-01 Info	
Ensemble of the church of Saint-Hadelin except the neo-Romanesque chapel cemetery (north), the vestry and the organ (instrumental part and buffet) ^{(nl)} ^{(fr)}		Houyet		50.228930°N 5.008208°E	91072-PEX-0001-01 Info	Ensemble van de kerk Saint-Hadelin, uitgezonderd de neoromaanse kerkhofkapel (noord), de sacristie en het orgel (instrumentaal deel en buffet)
Facades and roofs of the castle of Vêves ^{(nl)} ^{(fr)}		Houyet		50.220808°N 4.982484°E	91072-PEX-0002-01 Info	
Aiguilles de Chaleux ^{(nl)} ^{(fr)}		Houyet		50.221557°N 4.950505°E	91072-PEX-0003-01 Info	
Aiguilles de Chaleux: extension of the site ^{(nl)} ^{(fr)}		Houyet		50.218322°N 4.951200°E	91072-PEX-0004-01 Info	

== See also ==
- List of protected heritage sites in Namur (province)
- Houyet
