= Waulsort Abbey =

Benedictine monastery in Hastière, Namur, Belgium

Coordinates: 50°12′36″N 4°48′00″E

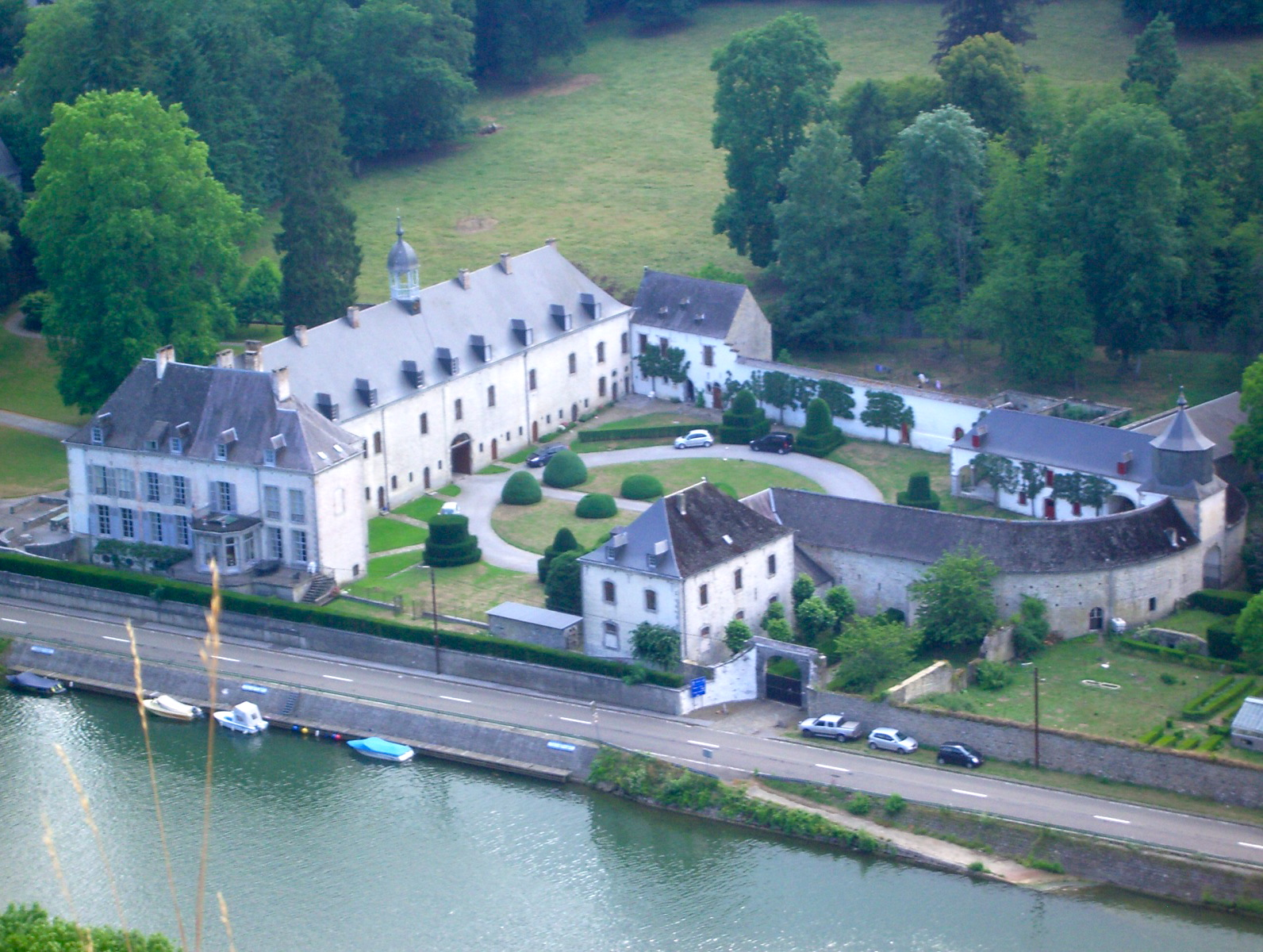
The former Waulsort Abbey

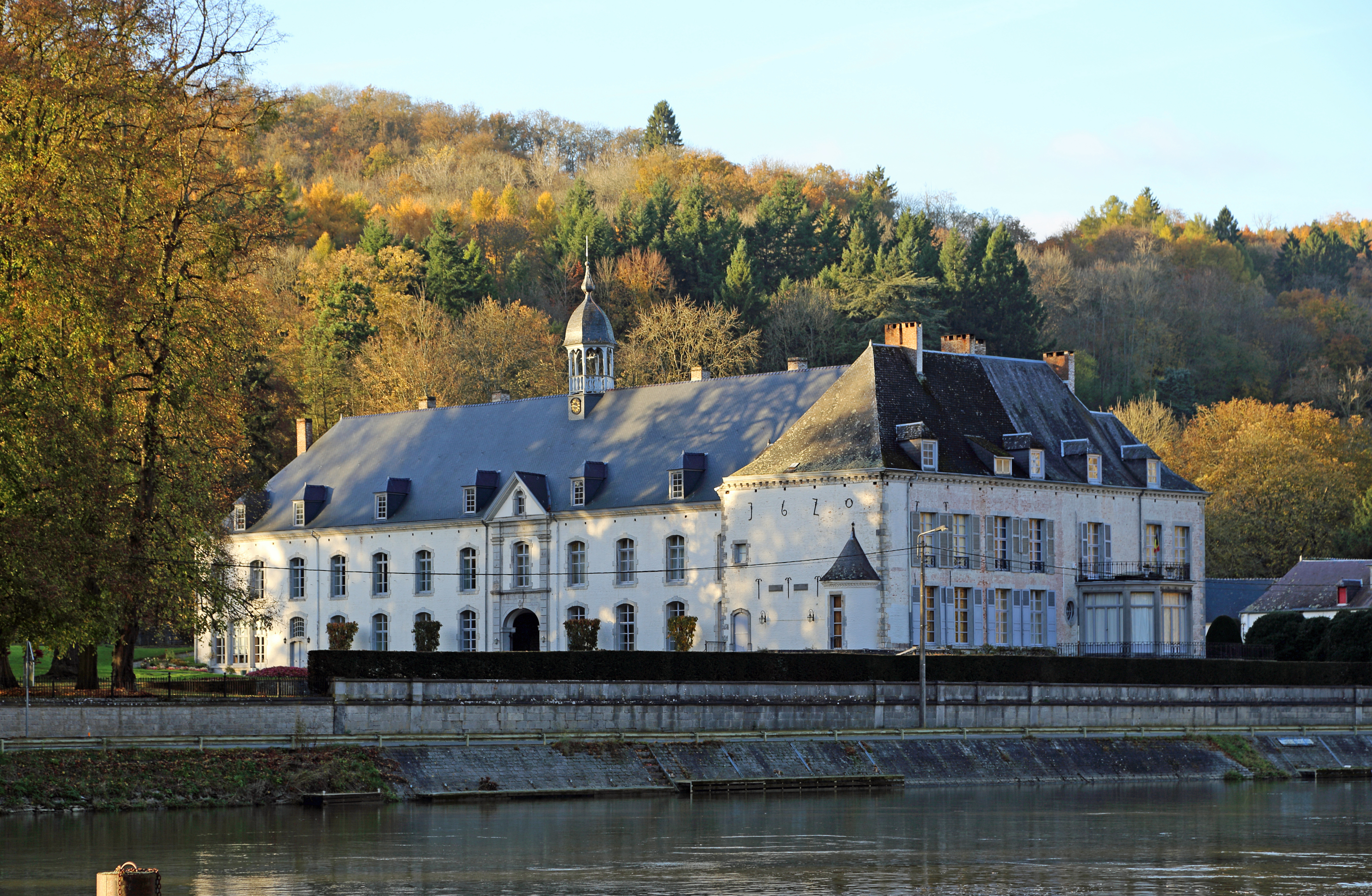
The former abbey seen from the Meuse river

Waulsort Abbey (French: Abbaye de Waulsort) was a Benedictine monastery located at Waulsort, Wallonia, now in Hastière in the province of Namur, Belgium.

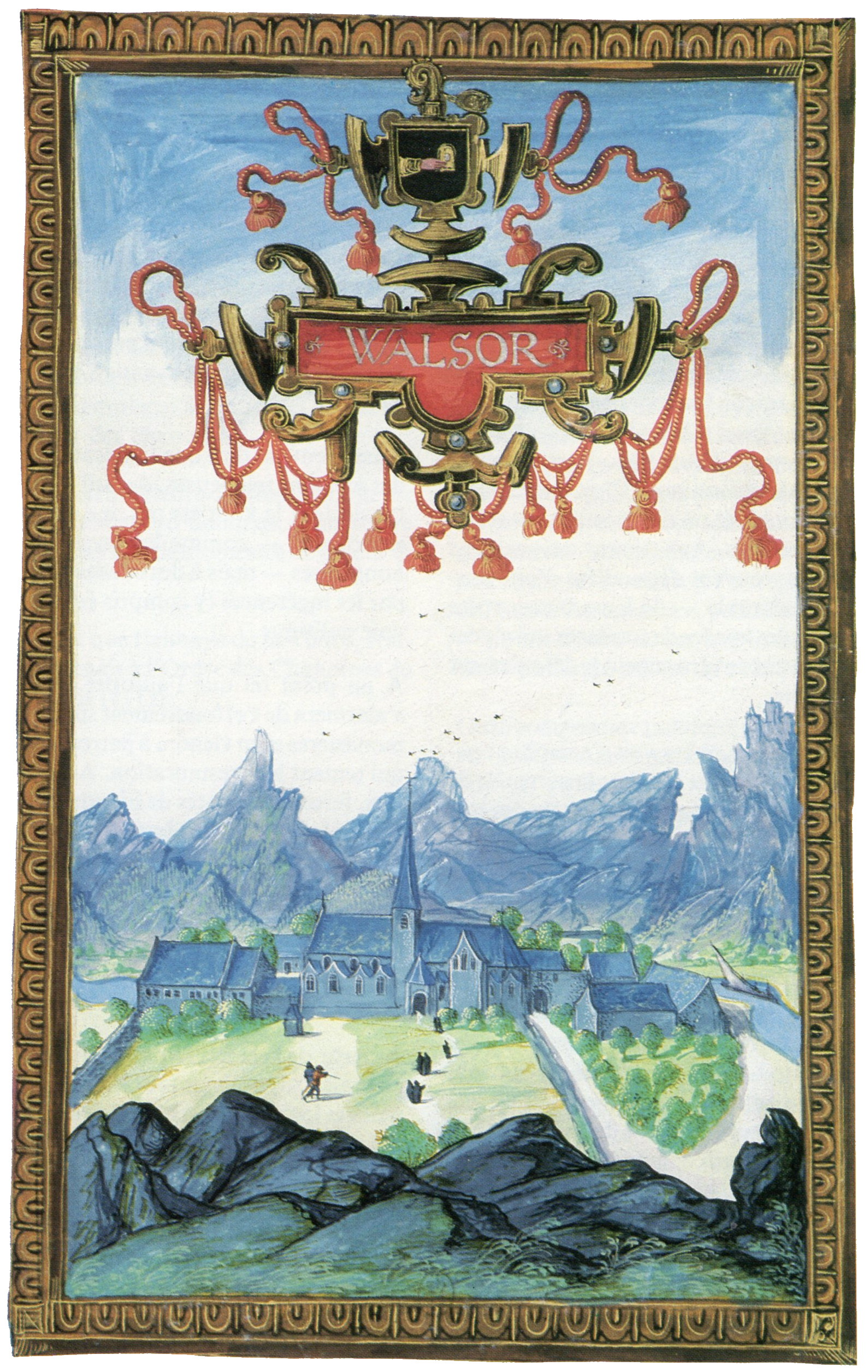
Waulsort abbey in 1604. Albums of Croÿ

The monastery was founded in 946 by Irish monks. They were invited by Eilbert de Florennes who wanted to found an abbey in reparation for a wrongful act committed. Saint Maccallin and Saint Cathróe were the first two abbots. Saint Forannan (d. 980) was also subsequently abbot of Waulsort.

The abbey was dissolved during the French Revolution in 1793, when it was sacked. The surviving structures have been remodelled as a private house.

The former abbey is principally known as the owner, from the 10th to the 18th century, of the Lothair Crystal.
