= Houyet =

Municipality in Wallonia, Belgium

Houyet: Houyet (Walloon)
- Municipality
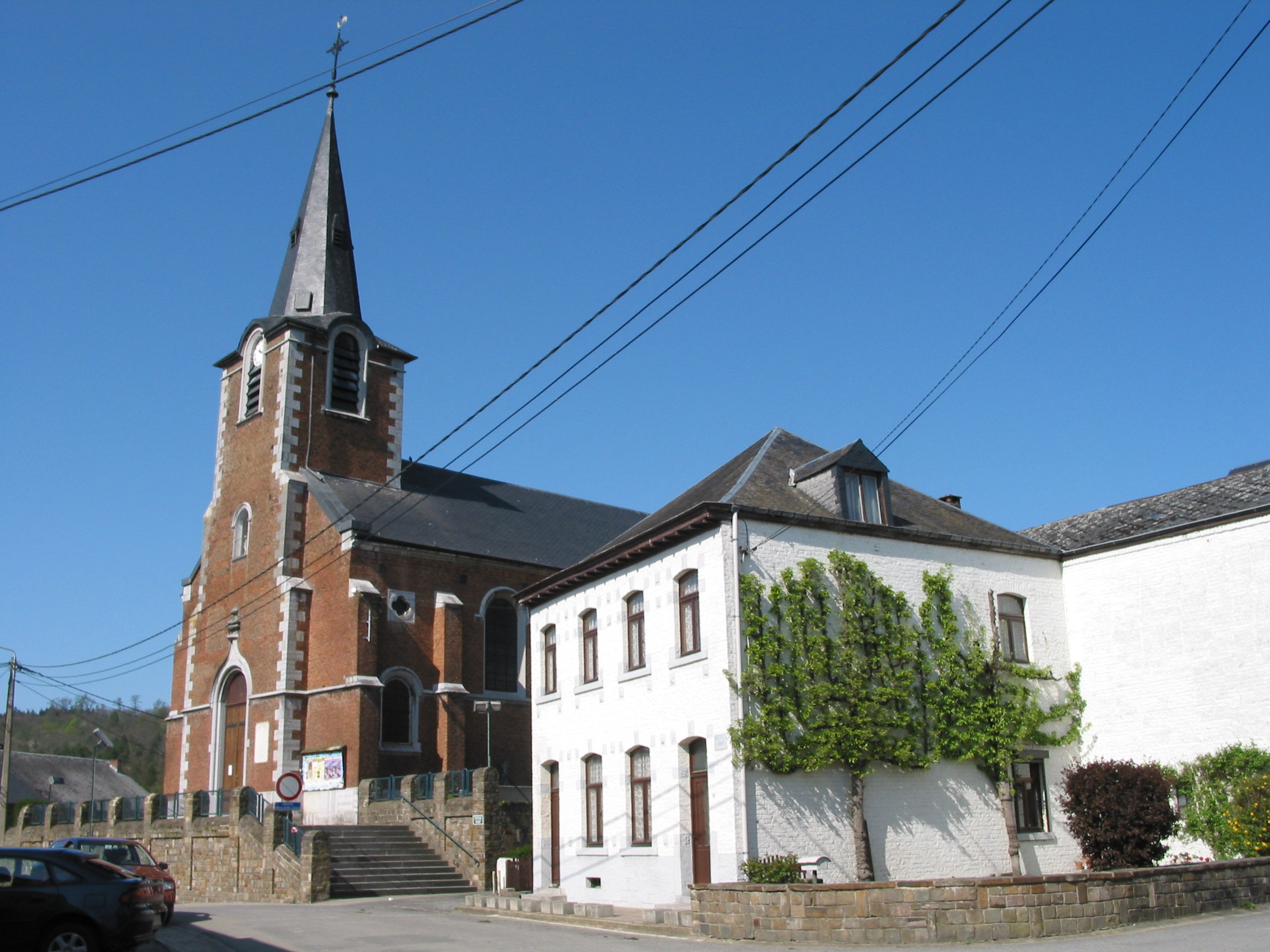
- Our Lady of the Assumption church

- Flag Coat of arms

- Location of Houyet in Namur province
- Interactive map of Houyet
- Location in Belgium
- Coordinates: 50°11′N 05°01′E
- Country: Belgium
- Community: French Community
- Region: Wallonia
- Province: Namur
- Arrondissement: Dinant

Government
  - Mayor: Hélène Lebrun
  - Governing party: UV – ADN

Area
  - Total: 122.85 km^{2} (47.43 sq mi)

Population (2018-01-01)
  - Total: 4,876
  - Density: 39.69/km^{2} (102.8/sq mi)
- Postal codes: 5560-5564
- NIS code: 91072
- Area codes: 082
- Website: www.houyet.be

Houyet (French pronunciation: [u.jɛ]) is a municipality of Wallonia in the province of Namur, Belgium.

On 1 January 2006 the municipality had 4,485 inhabitants. The total area is 122.31 km^{2}, giving a population density of 37 inhabitants per km^{2}.

The municipality consists of the following districts: Celles, Ciergnon, Custinne, Finnevaux, Hour, Houyet, Hulsonniaux, Mesnil-Église, Mesnil-Saint-Blaise, and Wanlin.

The town of Houyet lies on the river Lesse, some 20 kilometres (12 mi) to the southeast of Dinant.

== Town twins ==
- (France) Rasteau (since 1991)

== Image gallery ==
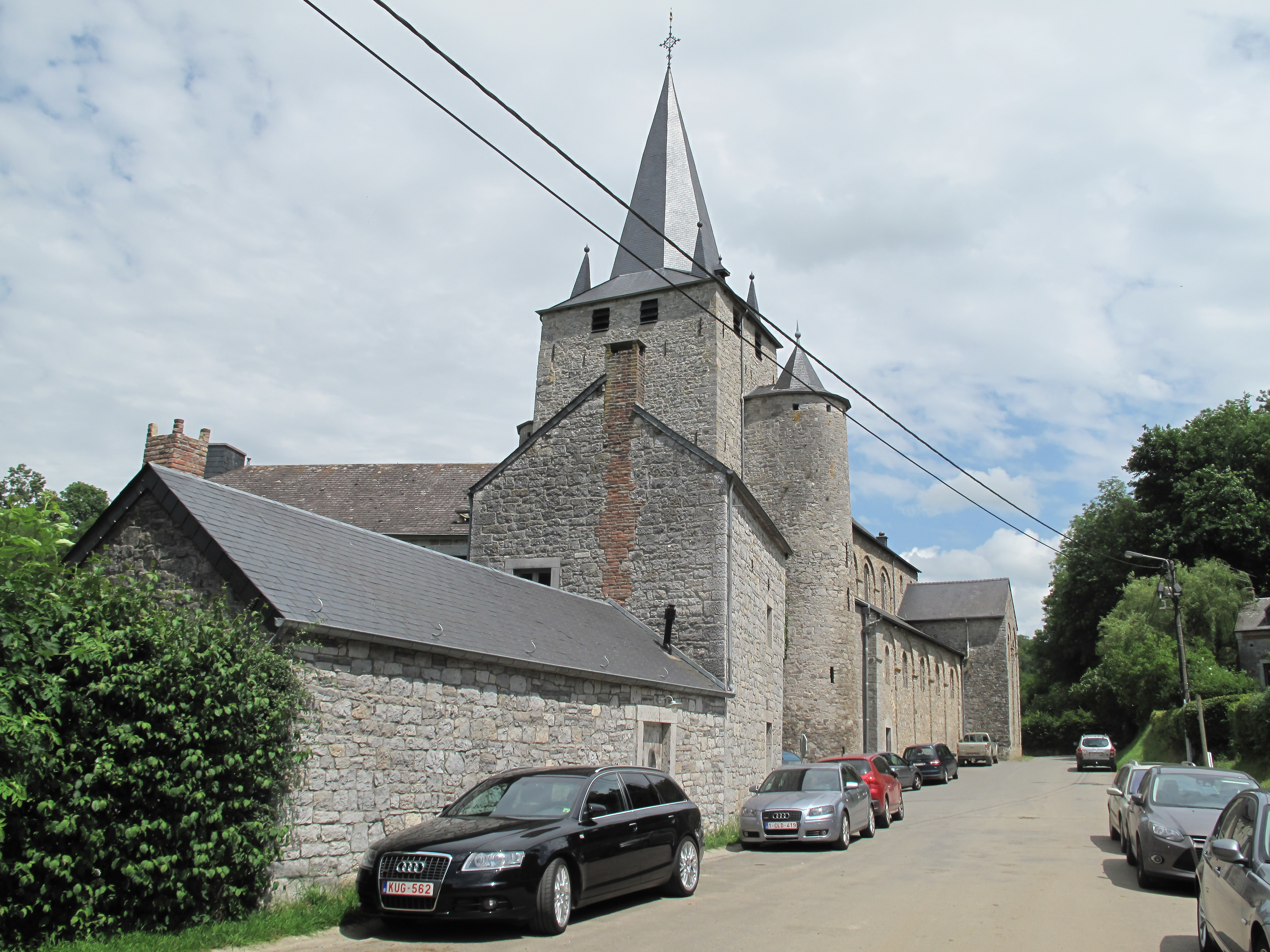
Celles, the Collegiate Church of Saint Hadelin (11th century)

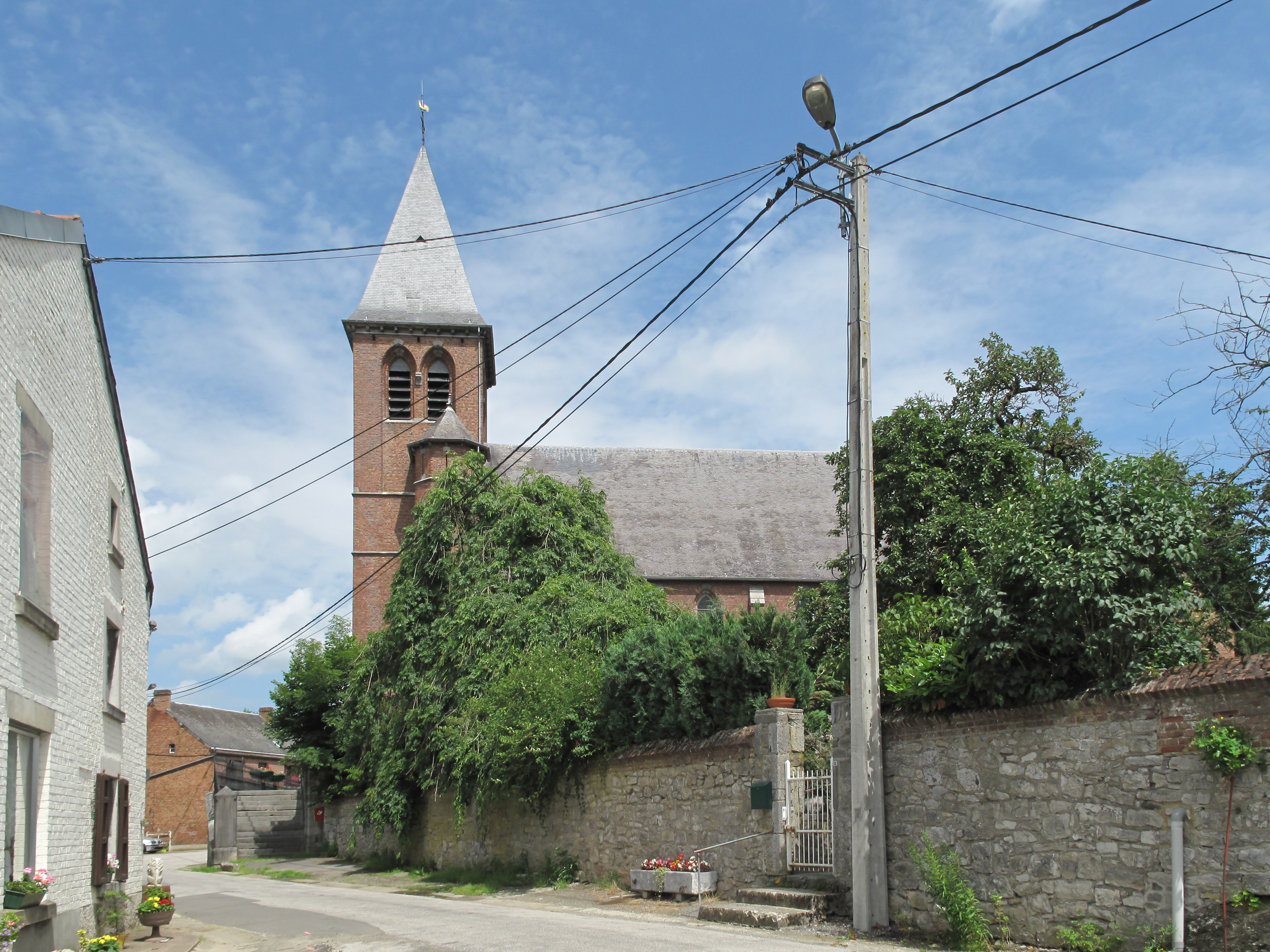
Ciergnon, church

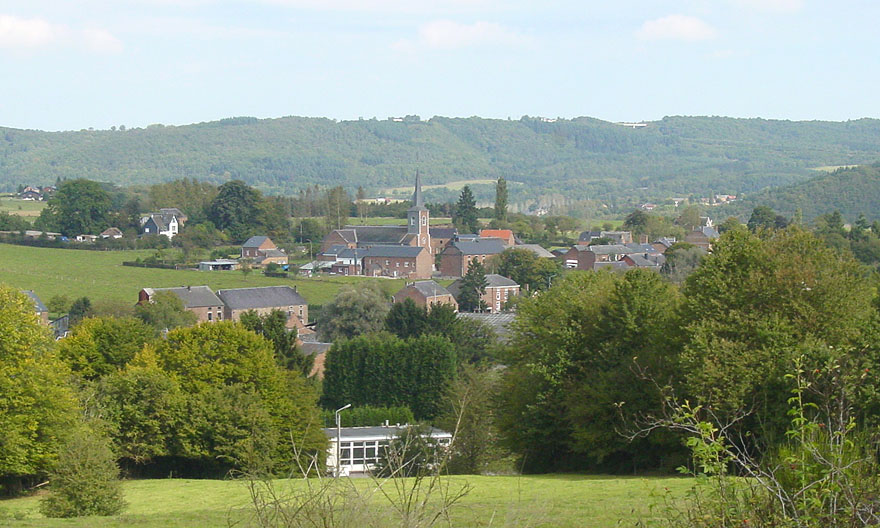
Hour, view of the village

== See also ==
- List of protected heritage sites in Houyet
