= Château de Vêves =

Castle in Belgium

Coordinates: 50.2208°N 4.9826°E

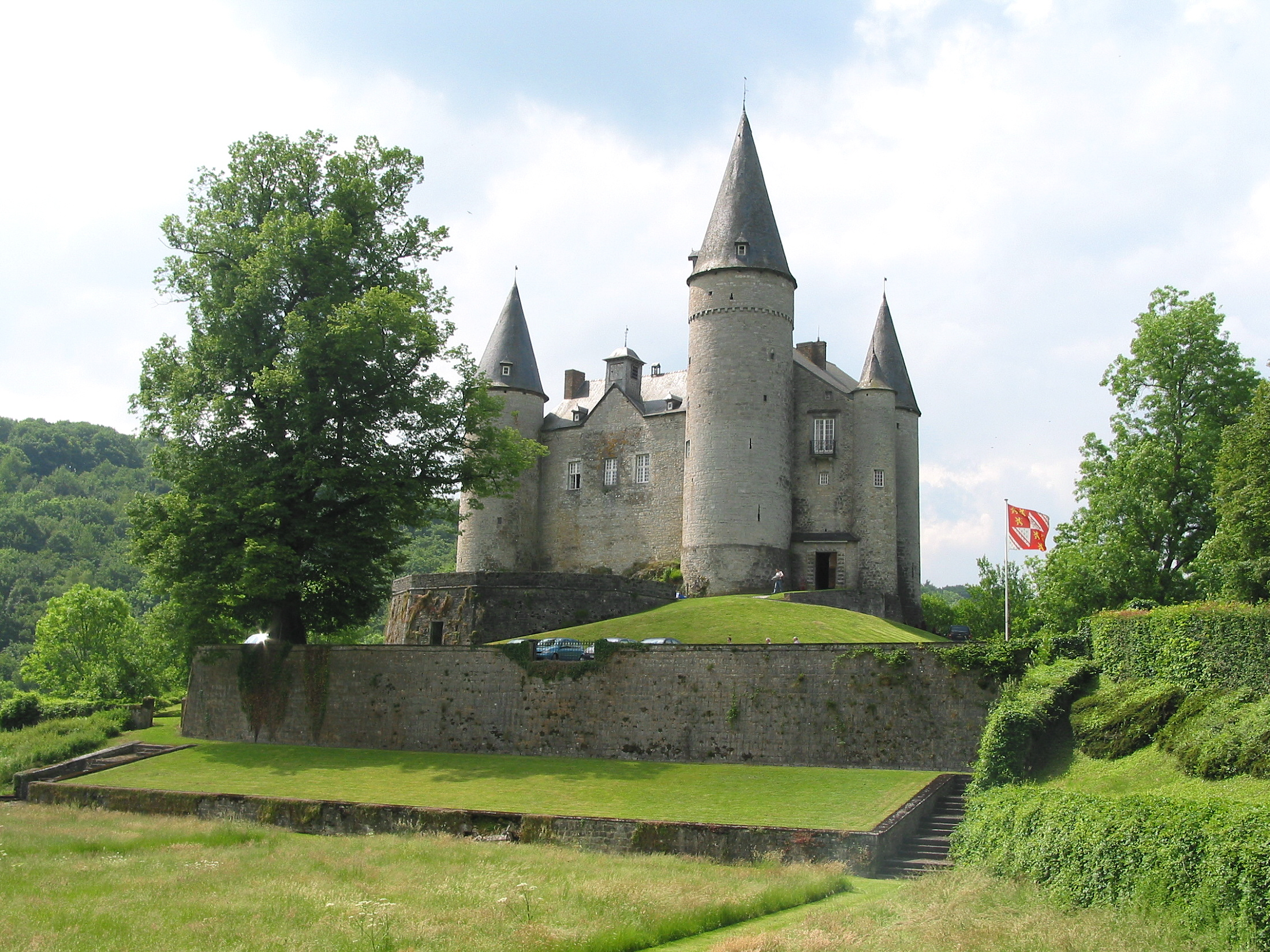
Castle of Vêves

The Castle of Vêves (French: Château de Vêves, French pronunciation: [ʃato də vɛv]) occupies a rocky platform in Wallonia just outside the village of Celles, in the province of Namur, Belgium. It is classified as Major Heritage of Wallonia.

== History ==
According to tradition, the site has been occupied by castles since the time of Pippin of Herstal (7th century). In the later Middle Ages, the area fell under control of the Beaufort family, which oversaw the construction of a stronghold here in about 1230.

The present castle, in the form of an irregular pentagon and flanked by six round towers of varying size, dates largely from around 1410. Successive restorations modified especially the walls of the inner courtyard, one of which is lined with a distinctive half-timbered gallery of two levels, and another of which was given a red brick facade in the Louis XV style. The northern frontage is crowned with a small cupola containing a clock.

== Brief description ==
The basic shape of the complex resembles an irregular triangle, enclosed by four large and two smaller towers. Its shape is given by the surface of the rock on which it was built. During the Renaissance it was completely rebuilt. In the time of Louis XV, the owners had further changes made, especially to the interior decoration, wood paneling, alcoves and exterior windows. On the courtyard side, two half-timbered galleries, one above the other, have been preserved. They connect the original, medieval living area with a wing of the 16th century. The individual rooms of the chateau are furnished with 18th century furniture from the estate of Countess Athénaïs de Mortemart.

== See also ==
- List of castles in Belgium
