= Hastière =

Municipality in Wallonia, Belgium

Hastière Astire (Walloon)
- Municipality
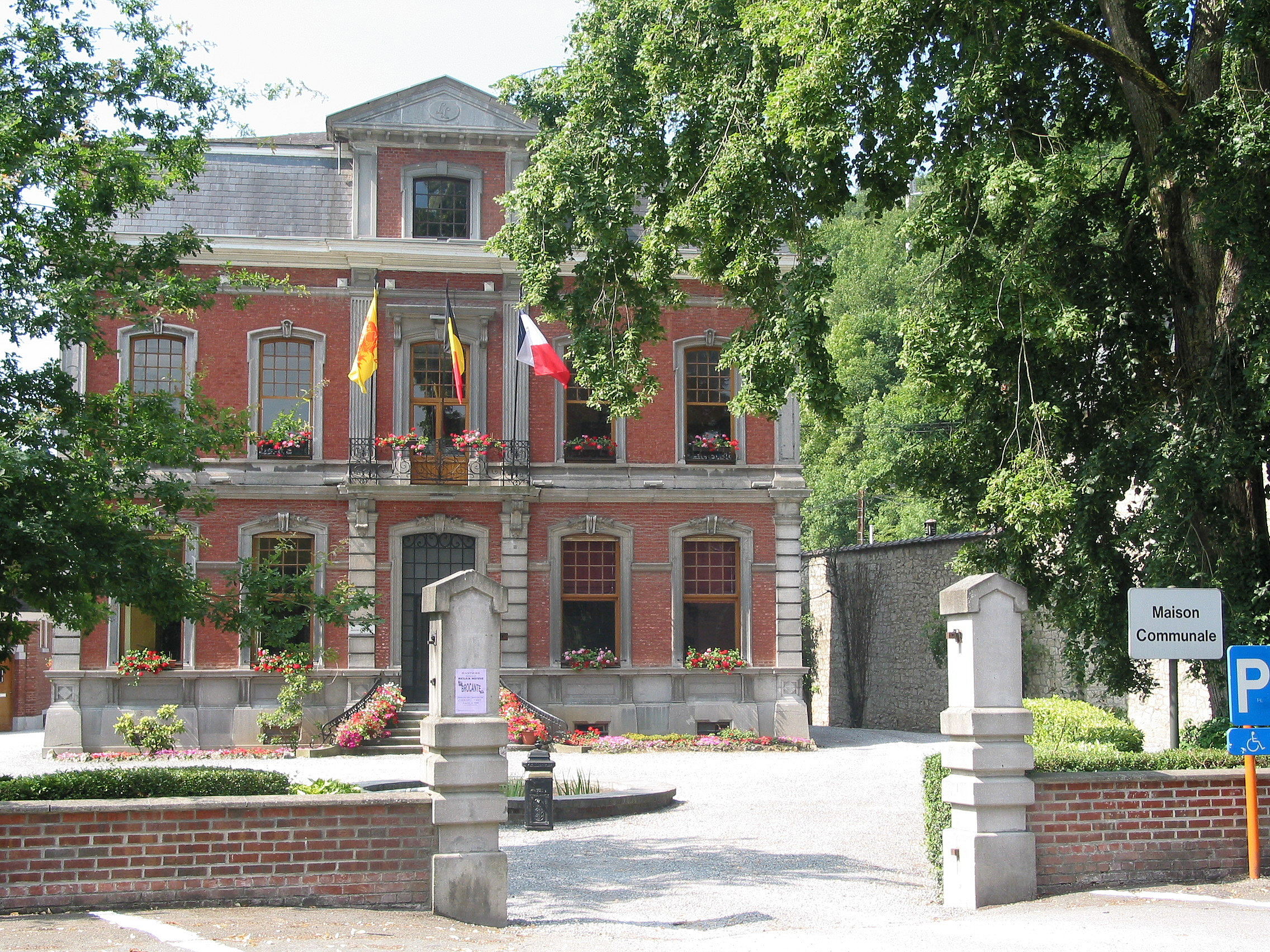
- Town Hall of Hastière

- Flag Coat of arms

- Location of Hastière in Namur province
- Interactive map of Hastière
- Location in Belgium
- Coordinates: 50°13′N 04°50′E
- Country: Belgium
- Community: French Community
- Region: Wallonia
- Province: Namur
- Arrondissement: Dinant

Government
  - Mayor: Claude Bultot (PS)
  - Governing party: PS

Area
  - Total: 56.59 km^{2} (21.85 sq mi)

Population (2018-01-01)
  - Total: 5,979
  - Density: 105.7/km^{2} (273.6/sq mi)
- Postal codes: 5540-5544
- NIS code: 91142
- Area codes: 082
- Website: www.hastiere.be

Hastière (French pronunciation: [as.tjɛʁ]; Walloon: Astire) is a municipality of Wallonia located in the province of Namur, Belgium.

On 1 January 2006 the municipality had 5,230 inhabitants. The total area is 56.46 square kilometres (21.8 sq mi), giving a population density of 93 inhabitants per square kilometre.

The municipality consists of the following districts: Agimont, Blaimont, Hastière-Lavaux (location of town hall), Hastière-par-delà, Heer, Hermeton-sur-Meuse, and Waulsort.

Hastière's attractions along the river Meuse include the Romanesque Abbey Church of Saint Peter, a former Benedictine monastery (at Hastière-Lavaux), the Renaissance Castle of Freÿr surrounded by 18th-century classical gardens and facing the rocks of Freÿr (north of Waulsort), and the 17th-century buildings of another former Benedictine monastery (at Waulsort).

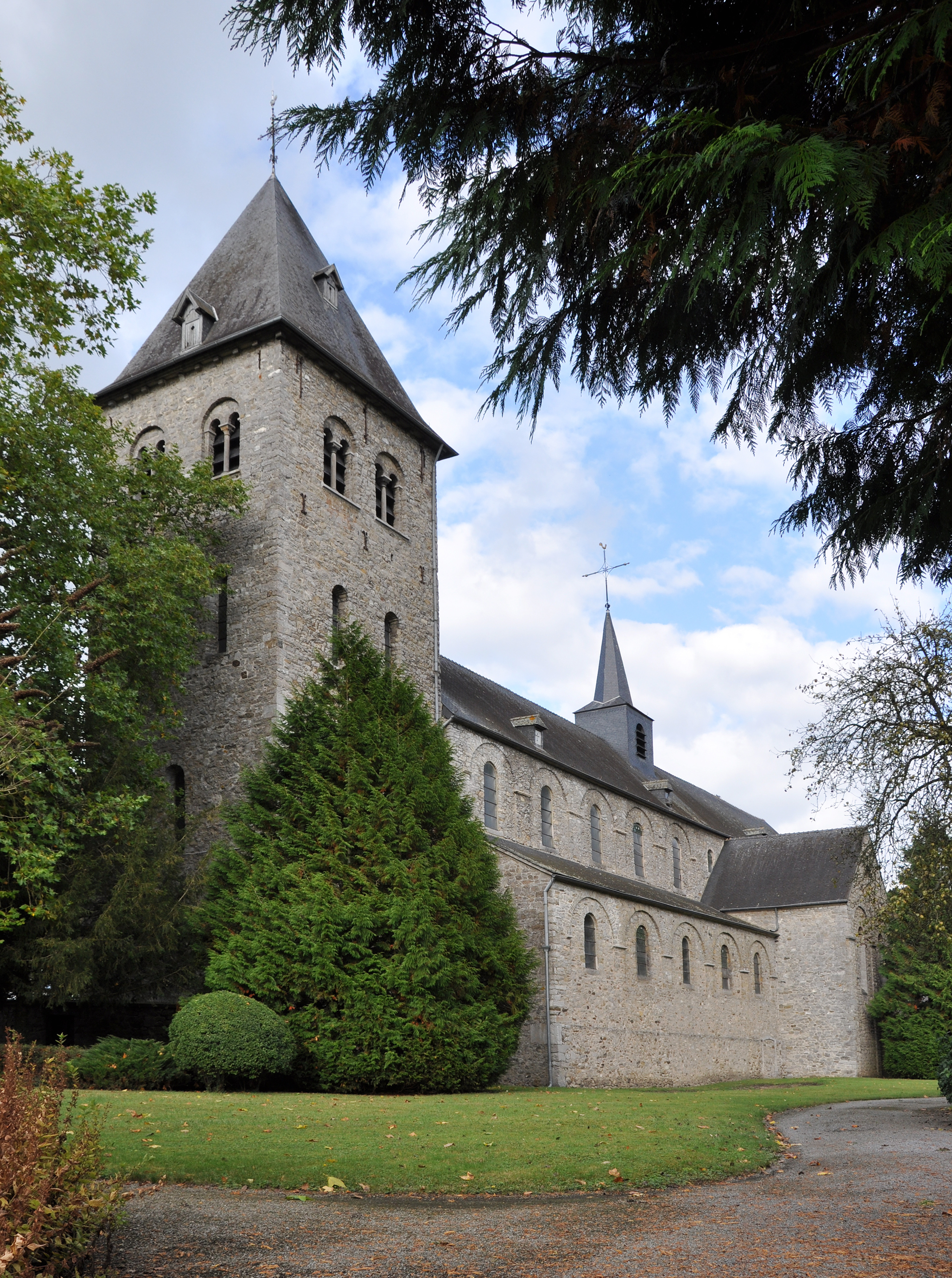
Abbey Church of Saint Peter, Hastière

== See also ==
- List of protected heritage sites in Hastière
