= Celles, Houyet =

Coordinates: 50.23°N 5.008°E

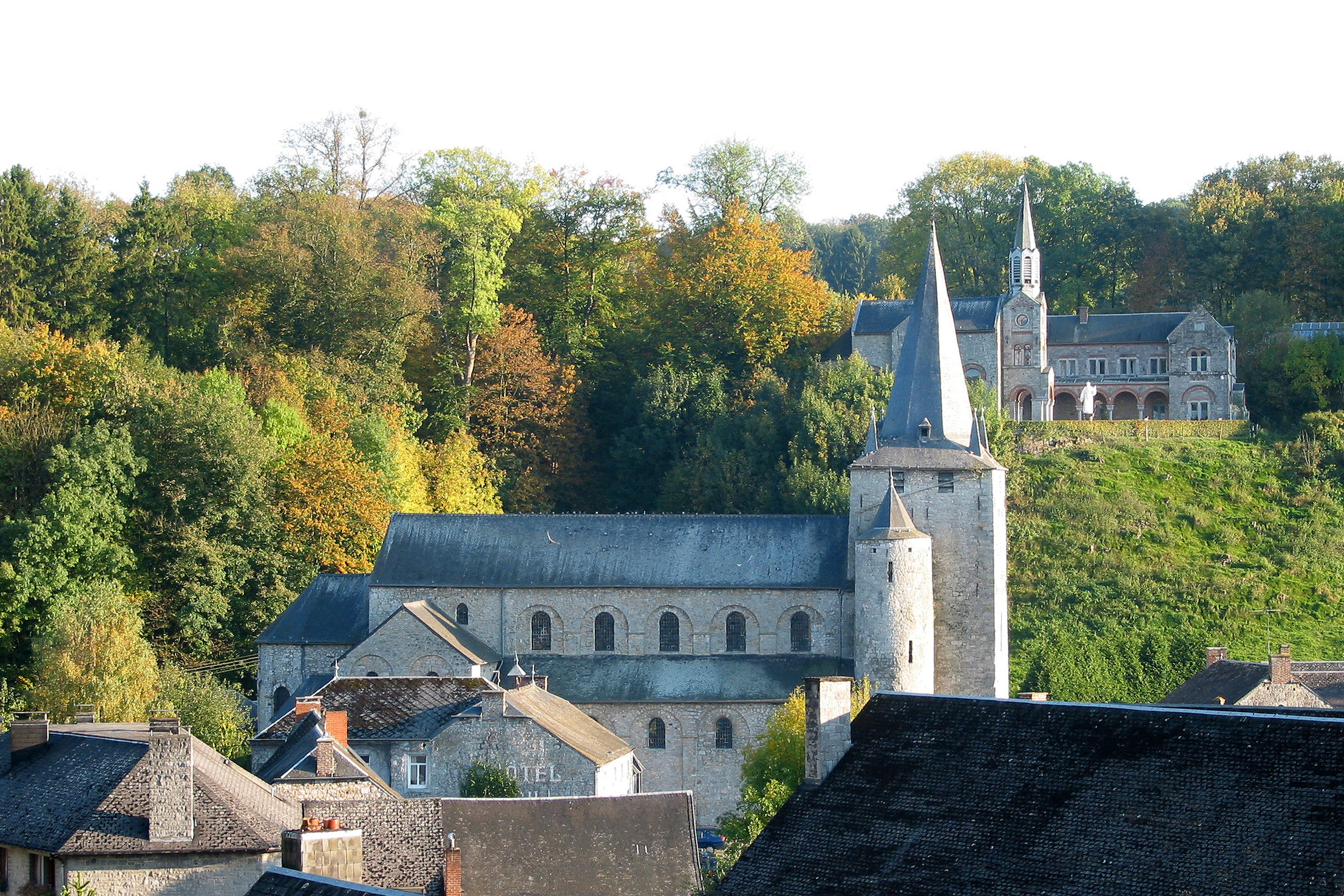
The former Collegiate Church of Saint Hadelin (11th century)

Celles (French pronunciation: [sɛl]; Walloon: Cele-dilé-Dinant) is a village of Wallonia and a district of the municipality of Houyet, located in the province of Namur, Belgium.

== History ==
The Collegiate Church of Saint Hadelin in Celles is a historical, well-preserved Romanesque church from the early 11th century.

Celles was one of the furthest points that the Wehrmacht advanced during the Battle of the Bulge (December 1944) in World War II, which is commemorated by a preserved Panther tank. (nl)

== Location ==
The Château de Vêves is near the village.

It is served by Gendron-Celles railway station, located several kilometres southwest of the village centre, next to the river Lesse.

== Preservation ==
It is a member of the heritage group Les Plus Beaux Villages de Wallonie ("The Most Beautiful Villages of Wallonia").
