= List of protected heritage sites in Dinant =

This table shows an overview of the protected heritage sites in the Walloon town Dinant. This list is part of Belgium's national heritage.

Object	Year/architect	Town/section	Address	Coordinates	Number^{?}	Image
Collegiate Notre-Dame de l'Assomption ^{(nl)} ^{(fr)}		Dinant		50.261070°N 4.912281°E	91034-CLT-0001-01	Collegiale kerk Notre-Dame de l'Assomption
Rocks Bayard and surrounding area ^{(nl)} ^{(fr)}		Dinant		50.244542°N 4.920888°E	91034-CLT-0002-01	Rotsen Bayard en omgeving
Abbey of Leffe ^{(nl)} ^{(fr)}		Dinant		50.268973°N 4.907412°E	91034-CLT-0003-01	Abdij van Leffe
House called "du Pleban" ^{(nl)} ^{(fr)}		Dinant	rue en Rhée n°89	50.260138°N 4.913751°E	91034-CLT-0004-01	
Tower building at the corner of the roads rue Cousot and rue Saint-Roch ^{(nl)} ^{(fr)}		Dinant		50.254673°N 4.915317°E	91034-CLT-0007-01	Toren van het gebouw op de hoek van de wegen rue Cousot en rue Saint-Roch
The parts which constitute the expansion of the classification of the monument of the tower of the building Generet on the corner of the roads rue Cousot and rue Saint-Roch: facades, roofs and the surrounding wall adjacent to the rue Saint-Roch ^{(nl)} ^{(fr)}		Dinant		50.254815°N 4.915575°E	91034-CLT-0008-01	De delen die de uitbreiding vormen van de classificatie van het monument van de toren van het gebouw Generet op de hoek van de wegen rue Cousot en rue Saint-Roch: gevels, daken en de omliggende muur grenzend aan de rue Saint-Roch
Ruins of the old ducal castle and the ensemble of the ruins and surrounding area ^{(nl)} ^{(fr)}		Dinant		50.271538°N 4.897487°E	91034-CLT-0009-01	
Castle, former monastery of the Bouillon: facades and roofs ^{(nl)} ^{(fr)}		Dinant	rue Richiers, n°58 (M) et ensemble formé par ce château et ses abords (S).	50.271526°N 4.898537°E	91034-CLT-0010-01	
House called "The l'Ecolâtre" or "du Marguillier" ^{(nl)} ^{(fr)}		Dinant	rue Richier n°29	50.272246°N 4.897486°E	91034-CLT-0011-01	
Gate of Saint-Martin ^{(nl)} ^{(fr)}		Dinant		50.259116°N 4.912750°E	91034-CLT-0012-01	Poort Saint-Martin
Hospice Civil, a former Capuchin monastery (old parts) and the ensemble of the building and garden ^{(nl)} ^{(fr)}		Dinant		50.258618°N 4.911322°E	91034-CLT-0013-01	Hospice civil, een voormalig kapucijner klooster (oude delen) en het ensemble van het gebouw en de tuin
Rocks of Moniat ^{(nl)} ^{(fr)}		Dinant		50.242558°N 4.887366°E	91034-CLT-0015-01	Rotsen van Moniat
Church of Saint-Lambert ^{(nl)} ^{(fr)}		Dinant		50.272427°N 4.897125°E	91034-CLT-0016-01	Kerk Saint-Lambert
Gate of Val ^{(nl)} ^{(fr)}		Dinant		50.272499°N 4.896820°E	91034-CLT-0017-01	Poort van Val
Old rectory of the parish of Saint-Lambert ^{(nl)} ^{(fr)}		Dinant	rue Richier, n°54	50.271802°N 4.898137°E	91034-CLT-0021-01	
Church of Notre-Dame ^{(nl)} ^{(fr)}		Dinant		50.247313°N 4.989795°E	91034-CLT-0023-01	Kerk Notre-Dame
Romanesque crypt and the choir of the old church of Thynes-lez-Dinant, with the chapel in the cemetery ^{(nl)} ^{(fr)}		Dinant		50.279433°N 4.987567°E	91034-CLT-0027-01	
Chapel of St. Remy and the ensemble of the chapel and its surroundings ^{(nl)} ^{(fr)}		Dinant		50.267588°N 5.019443°E	91034-CLT-0028-01	
Patrician's house: facades and roofs ^{(nl)} ^{(fr)}		Dinant	rue Daoust n° 104	50.251515°N 4.918412°E	91034-CLT-0029-01	
Chapel of Sainte-Ermelinde, furnishings and adjacent square ^{(nl)} ^{(fr)}		Dinant	rue Richier, links van n°60	50.270968°N 4.899460°E	91034-CLT-0030-01	
Facades and roofs of the portico and of the café 'au repos du Pèlerin " ^{(nl)} ^{(fr)}		Dinant	rue de Mahène n°24	50.246941°N 4.989736°E	91034-CLT-0031-01	
Facades and roofs of farm buildings ^{(nl)} ^{(fr)}		Dinant	rue du Centre n°s 22 en 23, tegenwoordig rue de Mahène, n°s 22-23	50.246924°N 4.990297°E	91034-CLT-0032-01	
Calvary, on the classified site of Notre Dame ^{(nl)} ^{(fr)}		Dinant		50.247164°N 4.989658°E	91034-CLT-0033-01	Calvarie, op de geclassificeerde site van de kerk Notre-Dame
Fortifications Hauterecenne called "Camp Romain" ^{(nl)} ^{(fr)}		Dinant		50.210849°N 4.948844°E	91034-CLT-0034-01	
Ensemble of the surroundings of the church Foy-Notre-Dame ^{(nl)} ^{(fr)}		Dinant		50.247111°N 4.988922°E	91034-CLT-0035-01	Ensemble van de omgeving van de kerk Foy-Notre-Dame
House du Peuple: facades and roofs ^{(nl)} ^{(fr)}		Dinant	place Patenier	50.263232°N 4.910297°E	91034-CLT-0036-01	Huis du Peuple: gevels en daken
Rue des Trois Escabelles, from the corner of the Rue des Fosses to the square Saint-Nicolas, including the "Hôtel du Commerce" and the house "Kelner" ^{(nl)} ^{(fr)}		Dinant		50.256547°N 4.914244°E	91034-CLT-0037-01	
Towers with ramparts and gates of the old city walls: the tower of Saint-Martin (rue de la Grêle) and gate of Corroy ^{(nl)} ^{(fr)}		Dinant		50.255346°N 4.917412°E	91034-CLT-0038-01	
Old towers of the ramparts and city gates: fortification and four towers (located parallel to the rue Saint-Pierre) ^{(nl)} ^{(fr)}		Dinant		50.264967°N 4.909727°E	91034-CLT-0039-01	Oude torens van de stadswallen en de stadspoorten: vestingwerk en vier torens (parallel gelegen aan de rue Saint-Pierre)
Old towers of the ramparts and the city gates of the tower Empereur, called "Tour Maximilien" ^{(nl)} ^{(fr)}		Dinant		50.265461°N 4.909410°E	91034-CLT-0040-01	
Ruins of Chateau-Thierry, on the classified site of Cretiats ^{(nl)} ^{(fr)}		Dinant		50.209633°N 4.875408°E	91034-CLT-0041-01	
House: walls and roofs ^{(nl)} ^{(fr)}		Dinant	rue Richiers n°40	50.272332°N 4.897803°E	91034-CLT-0042-01	Huis: gevels en daken
House: walls and roofs ^{(nl)} ^{(fr)}		Dinant	rue du Bailliage n°18	50.272519°N 4.897958°E	91034-CLT-0043-01	
House: walls and roofs ^{(nl)} ^{(fr)}		Dinant	place du Bailliage n°4	50.272799°N 4.898580°E	91034-CLT-0044-01	Huis: gevels en daken
House: walls and roofs ^{(nl)} ^{(fr)}		Dinant	place du Bailliage n°22	50.272437°N 4.897797°E	91034-CLT-0045-01	Huis: gevels en daken
House: walls and roofs ^{(nl)} ^{(fr)}		Dinant	rue du Fourneau n°7	50.274577°N 4.896309°E	91034-CLT-0046-01	
House: walls and roofs ^{(nl)} ^{(fr)}		Dinant	rue Fétis n°68	50.273127°N 4.898446°E	91034-CLT-0047-01	
House facades, roofs and surrounding wall ^{(nl)} ^{(fr)}		Dinant	rue des Potiers n°12	50.272061°N 4.898192°E	91034-CLT-0048-01	Huis: gevels, daken en omliggende muur
House: walls and roofs ^{(nl)} ^{(fr)}		Dinant	rue des Potiers n°s 4-6	50.272187°N 4.898615°E	91034-CLT-0049-01	Huis: gevels en daken
House: walls and roofs ^{(nl)} ^{(fr)}		Dinant	rue Cardinal Mercier n°3	50.272831°N 4.896987°E	91034-CLT-0050-01	
House: walls and roofs ^{(nl)} ^{(fr)}		Dinant	rue Guiot n°5	50.273313°N 4.897477°E	91034-CLT-0051-01	
Perpendicular House: façades, roofs and walls surrounding it ^{(nl)} ^{(fr)}		Dinant	tussen rue Guiot n°3 en rue Génard n°12	50.273350°N 4.897555°E	91034-CLT-0052-01	
House: walls and roofs ^{(nl)} ^{(fr)}		Dinant	rue Barbier n°s 3-5	50.273952°N 4.897492°E	91034-CLT-0053-01	
House: walls and roofs ^{(nl)} ^{(fr)}		Dinant	place du Bailliage n°24	50.272406°N 4.897724°E	91034-CLT-0055-01	Huis: gevels en daken
House: walls and roofs ^{(nl)} ^{(fr)}		Dinant	rue Richier n°41	50.271769°N 4.897944°E	91034-CLT-0056-01	
House facades, roofs and surrounding wall ^{(nl)} ^{(fr)}		Dinant	rue Richier n°s 10-14	50.273791°N 4.897083°E	91034-CLT-0057-01	
House: walls and roofs ^{(nl)} ^{(fr)}		Dinant	rue Fétis n°74	50.273581°N 4.898120°E	91034-CLT-0058-01	
Chapel of Notre-Dame de Bonsecours, stone bridge dating from 1767, and 44 guard stones along the road "Bonsecours" ^{(nl)} ^{(fr)}		Dinant		50.262283°N 4.904140°E	91034-CLT-0059-01	
Church of Saint-Georges ^{(nl)} ^{(fr)}		Dinant		50.267168°N 4.907606°E	91034-CLT-0060-01	Kerk Saint-Georges
Valley of the Meuse between Bouvignes and Houx ^{(nl)} ^{(fr)}		Dinant		50.273744°N 4.896867°E	91034-CLT-0061-01	Vallei van de Maas tussen Bouvignes en Houx
Site of the Fonds de Leffe ^{(nl)} ^{(fr)}		Dinant		50.274695°N 4.921145°E	91034-CLT-0062-01	
Site of Cherau ^{(nl)} ^{(fr)}		Dinant		50.274006°N 4.958235°E	91034-CLT-0063-01	
Barn: walls and roofs ^{(nl)} ^{(fr)}		Dinant	route de Furfooz, tegenover n°32	50.234945°N 4.933371°E	91034-CLT-0064-01	
Facades and roofs between the two round towers on the right of the rock wall of the castle of Walzin, and the facades and roofs of the 15th century tower and the ensemble of the castle of Walzin, the rock "Al penne" with the ruins of Caverenne on its summit, and the boisé La Lesse and part of the alluvial plain ^{(nl)} ^{(fr)}		Dinant		50.219526°N 4.923320°E	91034-CLT-0065-01	Gevels en daken tussen de twee ronde torens rechts van de rotswand van het kasteel van Walzin, en de gevels en daken van de toren genaamd "15ème siècle" en het ensemble van het kasteel van Walzin, de rots "Al penne" met zijn ruïnes van Caverenne, en het bos La Lesse en een dee van de alluviale vlakte
House: walls and roofs ^{(nl)} ^{(fr)}		Dinant	rue de la Grèle n°15	50.255466°N 4.917137°E	91034-CLT-0067-01	
House: walls and roofs ^{(nl)} ^{(fr)}		Dinant	rue Daoust n°53	50.251994°N 4.917722°E	91034-CLT-0069-01	Huis: gevels en daken
The Touriste I and Touriste IV, old tour boats on the Meuse river ^{(nl)} ^{(fr)}		Dinant	rue Daoust, n°64	50.252868°N 4.917581°E	91034-CLT-0071-01	
The remains of the ancient northern front of the enclosure of the streets between rue Bouvignes Genard and Rue Barbier, the rocks below Crèvecoeur and the railway ^{(nl)} ^{(fr)}		Dinant		50.273722°N 4.896964°E	91034-CLT-0072-01	
Old house of Bouvignes called "maison espagnole" ^{(nl)} ^{(fr)}		Dinant	place du Bailliage	50.272579°N 4.898056°E	91034-CLT-0073-01	Oud huis van Bouvignes, genaamd "maison espagnole"
Rocks of Freÿr and surroundings ^{(nl)} ^{(fr)}		Dinant		50.213452°N 4.876657°E	91034-CLT-0074-01	Rotsen van Freÿr en omgeving
Site of "la Ranle", "les Traillis" and "les Cretiats" ^{(nl)} ^{(fr)}		Dinant		50.207154°N 4.881300°E	91034-CLT-0076-01	Site van "la Ranle", "les Traillis" en "les Crétiats"
House: walls and roofs ^{(nl)} ^{(fr)}		Dinant	rue Richier n°43	50.271723°N 4.898019°E	91034-CLT-0077-01	
House: walls and roofs ^{(nl)} ^{(fr)}		Dinant	rue Richier n°45	50.271664°N 4.898065°E	91034-CLT-0078-01	
Ensemble of the collegiate church of Saint-Perpète, except the organ (instrumental part and buffet) ^{(nl)} ^{(fr)}		Dinant		50.261070°N 4.912281°E	91034-PEX-0001-01	
The oak ceiling of the church of Notre-Dame ^{(nl)} ^{(fr)}		Dinant	Foy-Notre-Dame	50.247313°N 4.989795°E	91034-PEX-0002-01	
Fortifications of Hauterecenne called "Camp Romain" ^{(nl)} ^{(fr)}		Dinant		50.210849°N 4.948844°E	91034-PEX-0003-01	
Valley of the Meuse river between Bouvignes and Houx ^{(nl)} ^{(fr)}		Dinant		50.273744°N 4.896867°E	91034-PEX-0004-01	
Ensemble of the castle of Walzin, the rock "Al penne" with its summit and the ruins of the Caverenne, and the ensemble of the forest La Lesse and part of the floodplain ^{(nl)} ^{(fr)}		Dinant		50.222394°N 4.928053°E	91034-PEX-0005-01	
The rocks of Freÿr and the site of Colebi ^{(nl)} ^{(fr)}		Dinant		50.235676°N 4.892521°E	91034-PEX-0006-01	

== See also ==
- List of protected heritage sites in Namur (province)
- Dinant
