= Walzin Castle =

Castle in Wallonia, Belgium

- Belgium
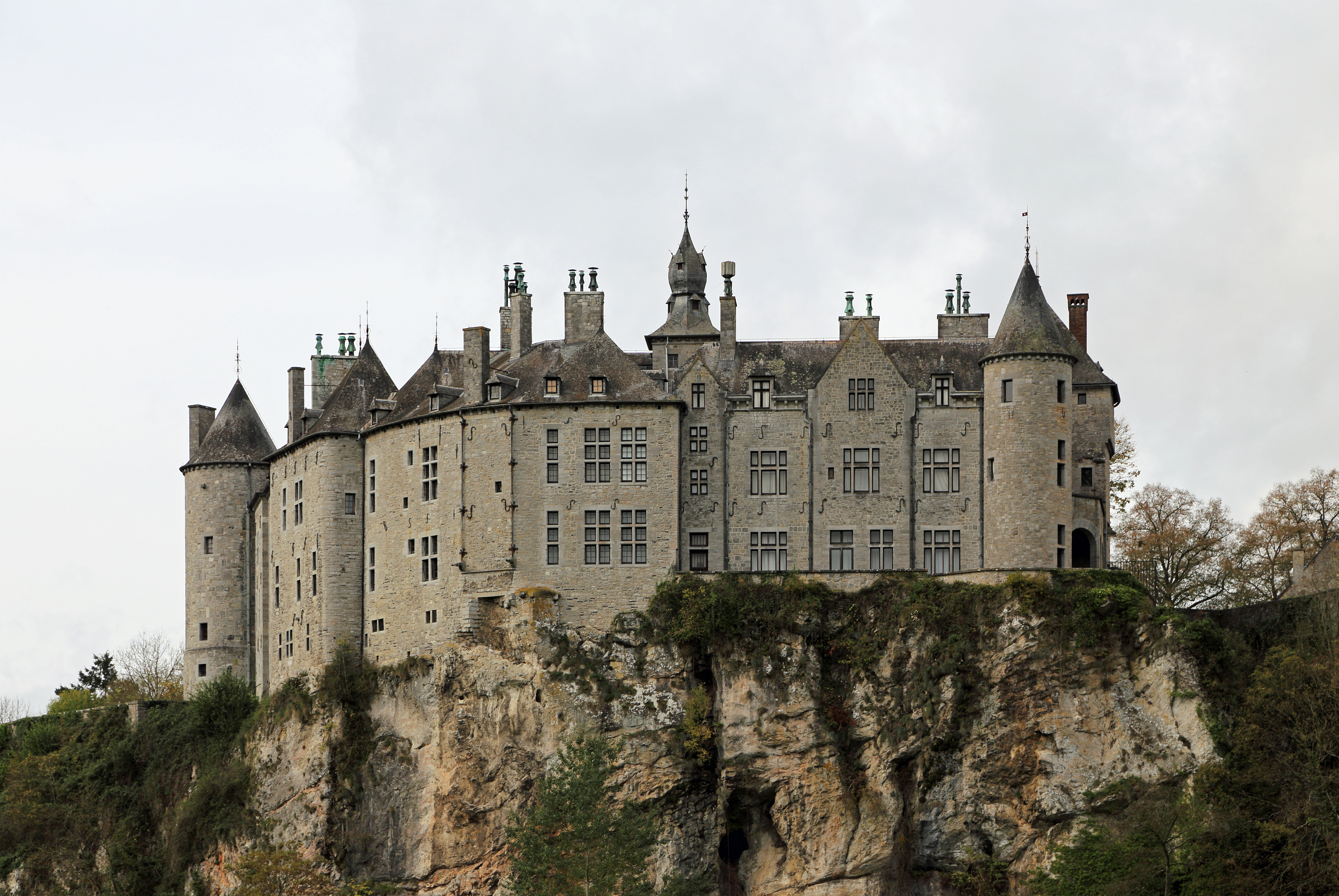

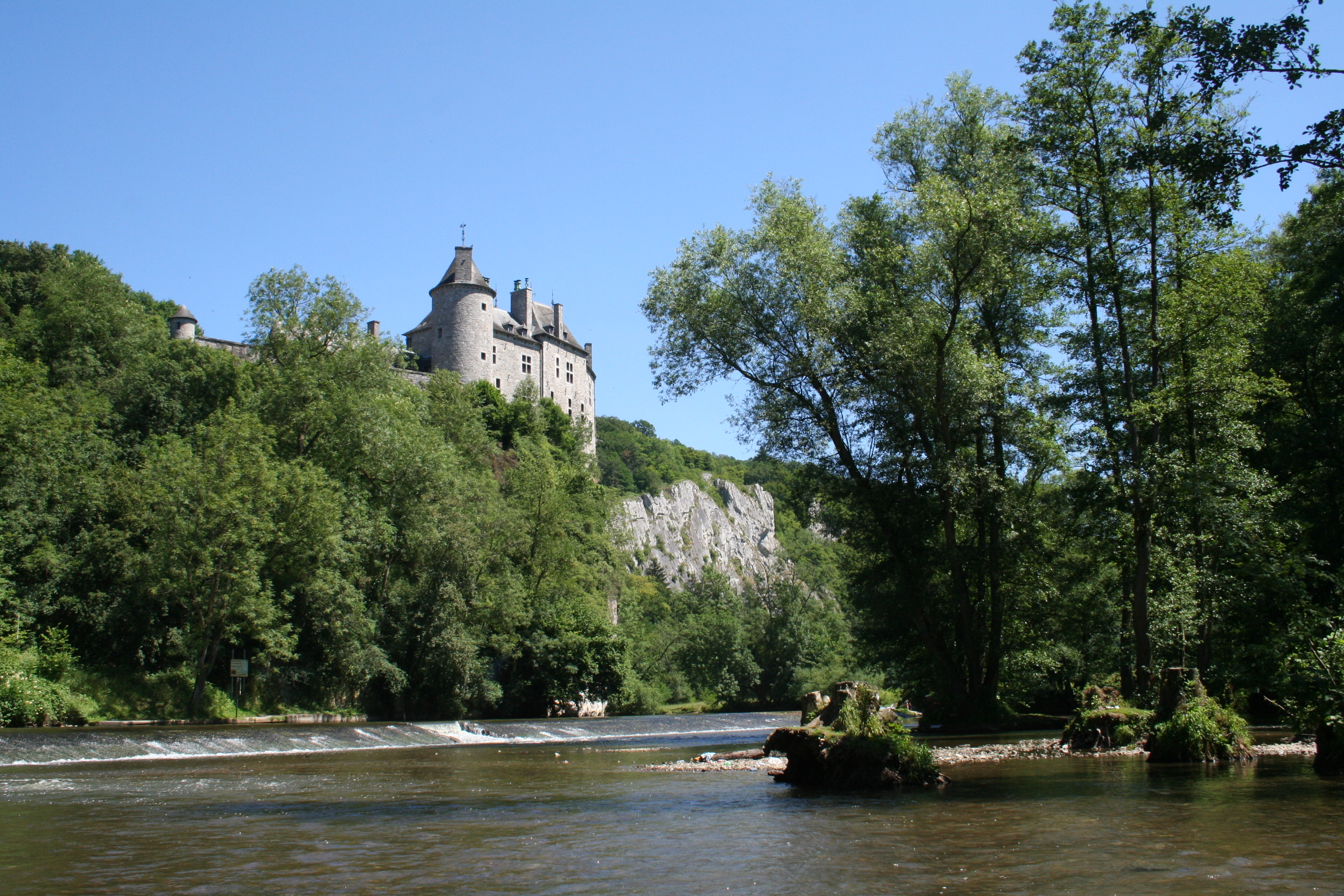

Site information
- Type: Castle
- Open to the public: Gardens only

Location
- Coordinates: 50.219°N 4.923°E

Site history
- Built: 11th Century
- Built by: possibly Theodwin of Liège

Walzin Castle is a castle in the district of Dréhance in the city of Dinant, part of Namur Province in Wallonia, Belgium. This Gothic Revival castle stands on a steep rock above the right bank of the Lesse, about 5 kilometres (3.1 mi) before it flows into the Meuse. Popular kayak routes allow a view of the castle from the Lesse.

== History ==
At this strategic point in the Lesse, which used to be a ford, a hill castle was already noted in the 11th and 12th centuries. This eagle's nest was razed to the ground four times. Only the 11th-century Keep has been preserved. The ruins of this military stronghold mainly consist of the keep with a remnant of about 13m of wall that is 1.70m to 3.30m thick. The first written notes of the Ruins of Cavrenne go back to 1235. In 1489, the then Prince-Bishopric of Liège ordered the destruction of the castle.

== Construction and restoration ==
The castle has known different periods of decline and prosperity, and has therefore been renovated several times throughout history in different styles. Construction began in the 13th century, and the 15th-century Renaissance horseshoe tower with four cannon ports still exists, even though the castle was burned down by the French army in 1554. In 1850, the later Baron Alfred Brugmann bought the ruins and carried out many restorations. He had them restored in 1881 in a sort of Spanish-Flemish style by architect Émile Janlet. The castle in this version can be seen on many postcards and drawings from the Belle Époque. In 1930, Baron Frédéric Brugmann de Walzin had the castle rebuilt again, this time by architect Octave Flanneau. He opted for the Maasland (Mosan art) style, which is common in the region, which gave the castle its current, well-known appearance. The works were finished in 1932. The gardens of the castle were designed by architect Louis Julien Breydel, who also has the Botanical Garden in Brussels to his name. The castle is located in a wooded area, the Bois du Chaleux. The gardens, however, are not accessible for viewing. There is a guided walk every Thursday during the summer at 10 am. Victor Hugo made a drawing of it in 1863.

== Gallery ==
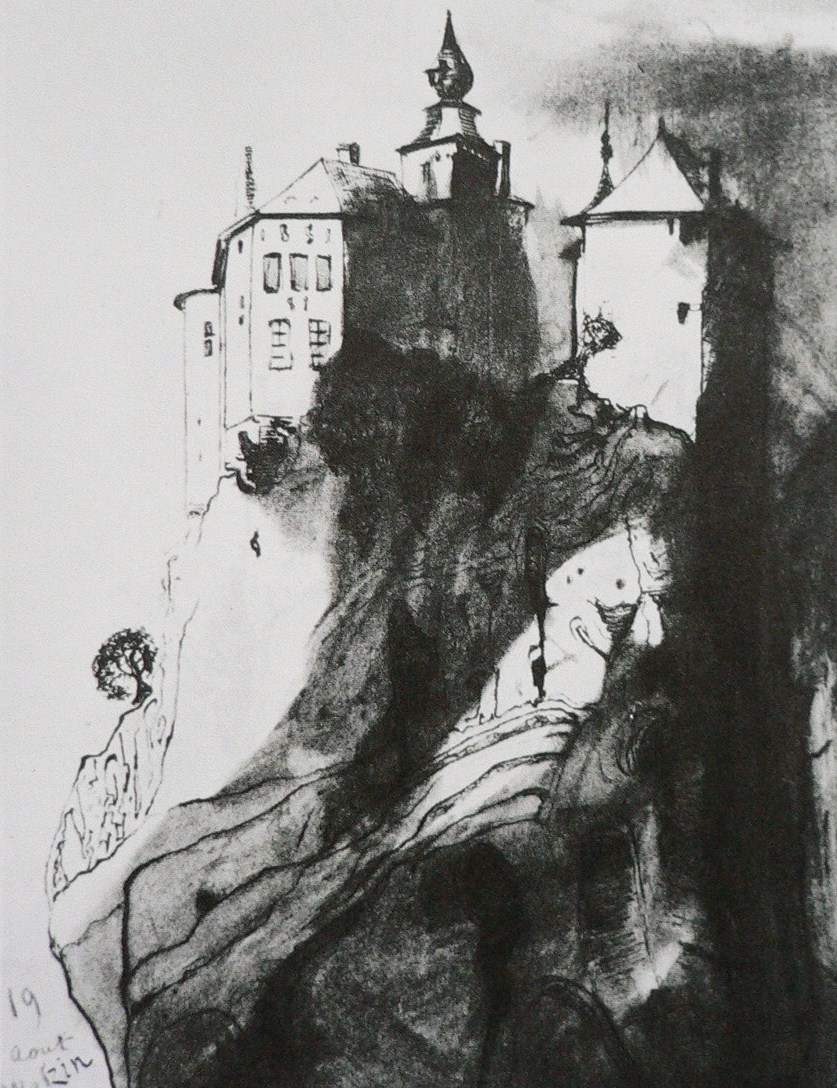
Sketch by Victor Hugo

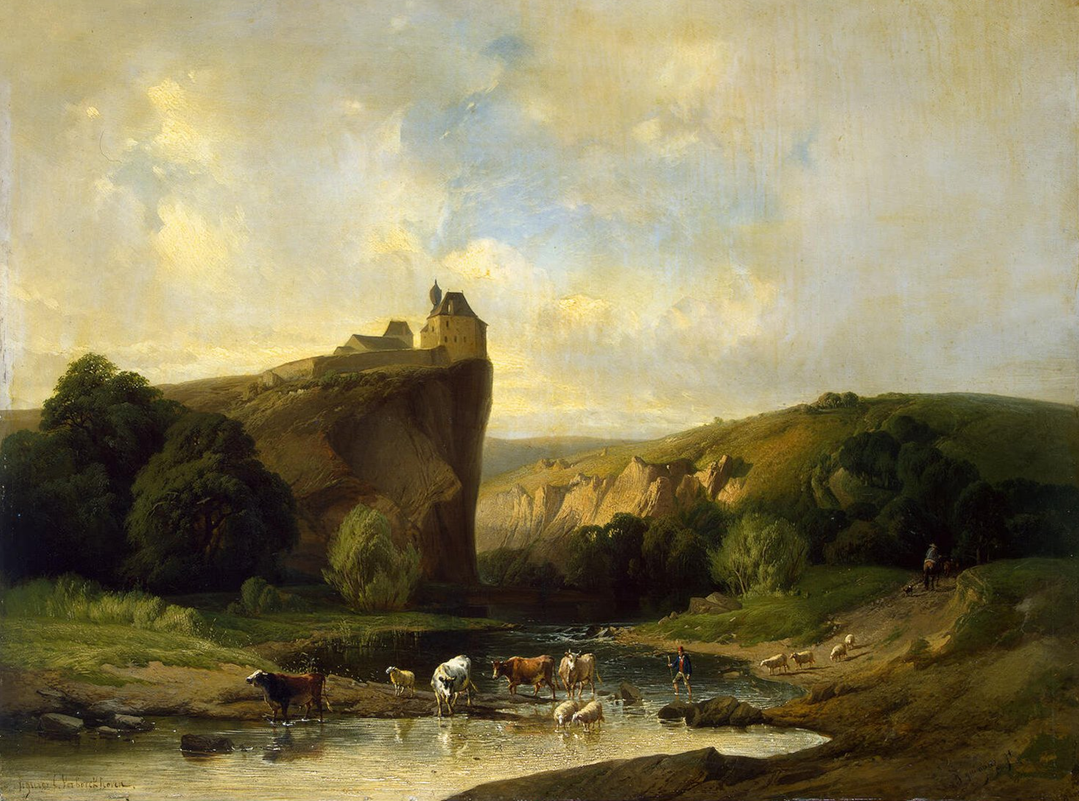
Painting by Joseph Quinaux

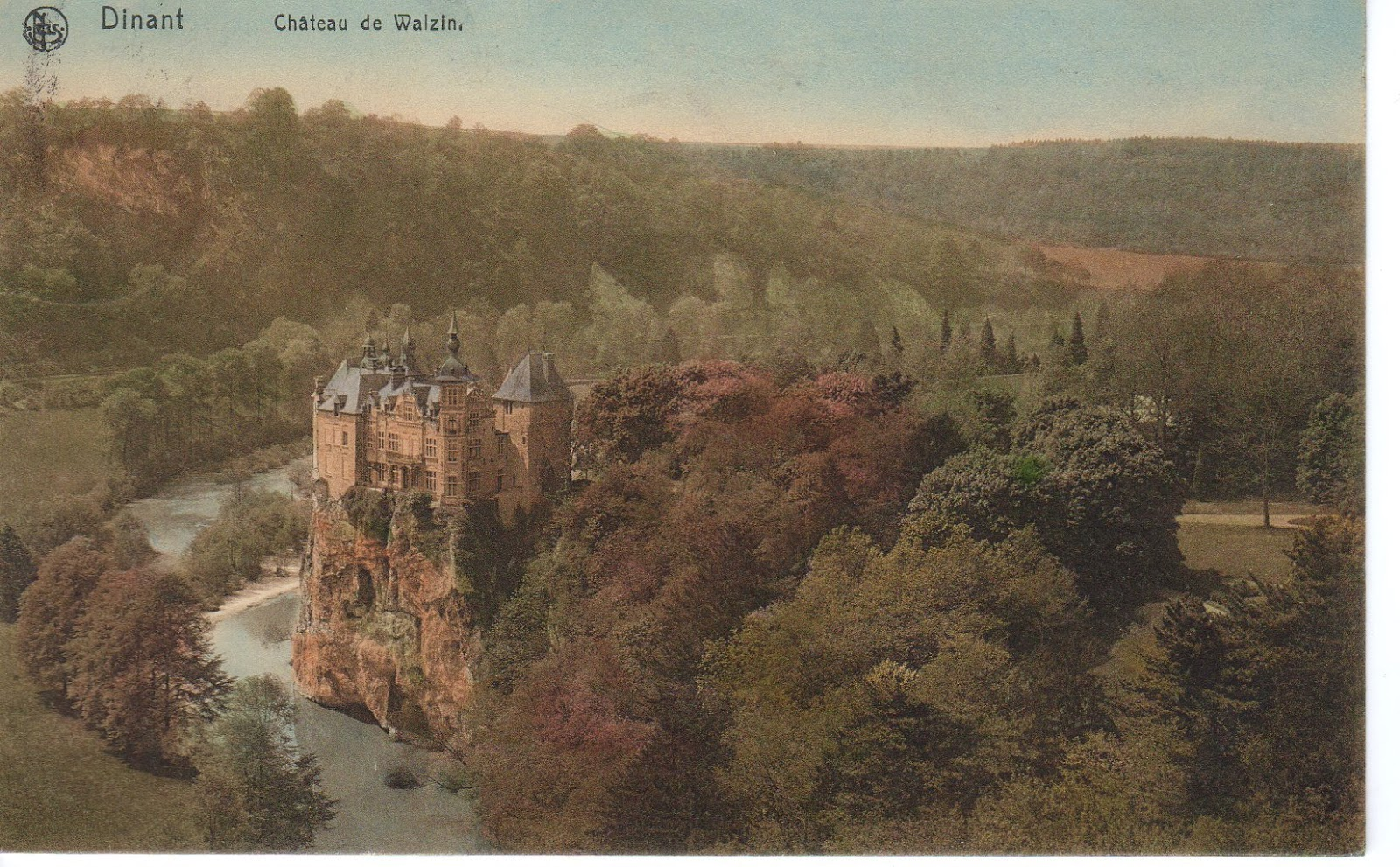
Postcard of 1912

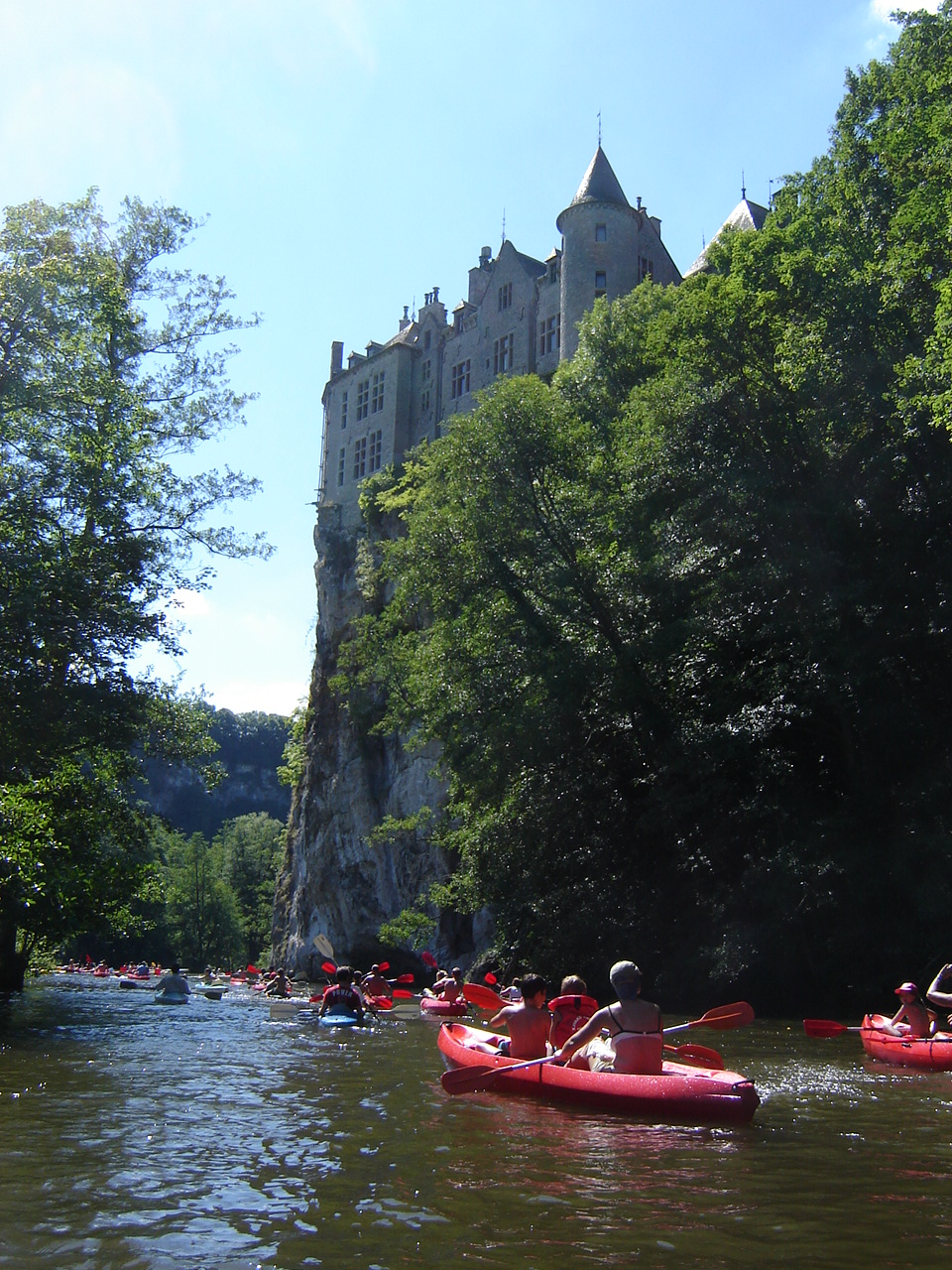
The castle high above the Lesse

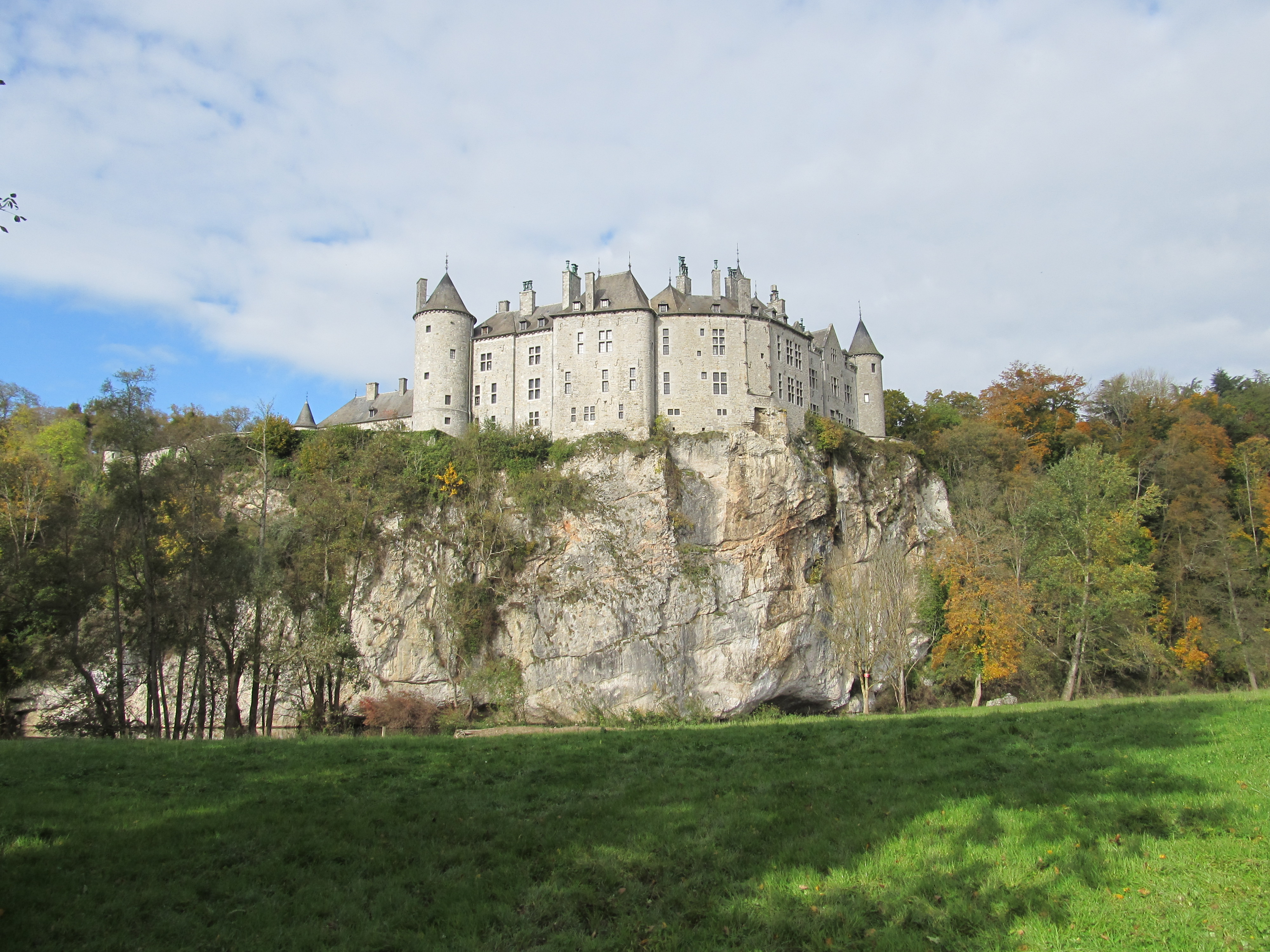

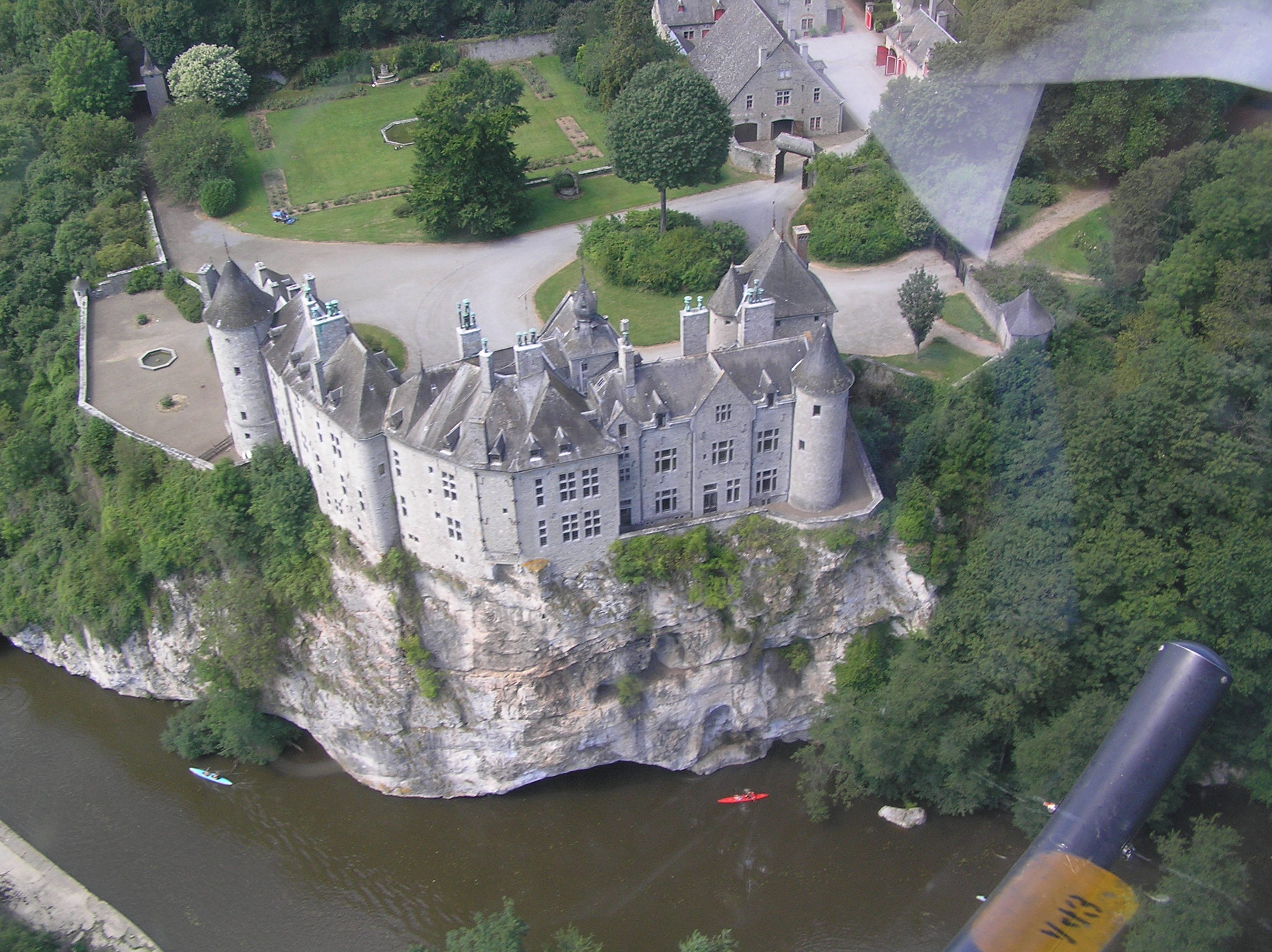

== See also ==
- List of castles in Belgium
