= January 23 (Eastern Orthodox liturgics) =

Day in the Eastern Orthodox liturgical calendar

Eastern Orthodox liturgical calendar
| January 22 | January 23 | January 24 |
January 23 O.S. ≍ February 5 N.S. January 23 N.S ≍ January 10 O.S.

An Eastern Orthodox cross

January 23 in Eastern Orthodox liturgical calendars is a feast day and a day of commemoration of saints and martyrs. Although some Orthodox churches use the Revised Julian Calendar and others use the traditional Julian calendar, the fixed commemorations for their respective January 23 are broadly the same, no matter which calendar is used. (Note: Despite the dates being the same, the days to which they refer typically differ by 13 days. The notation Old Style or O.S. is sometimes used to indicate a date in the traditional Julian Calendar (the "Old Calendar"). The notation New Style or N.S, indicates a date in the Revised Julian calendar (the "New Calendar").)

== Saints ==
- Hieromartyr Clement, Bishop of Ancyra, and Martyr Agathangelus (312)
- Saint Ascholius, Bishop of Thessaloniki (Note: See: (in Greek) Ιερά Μητρόπολις Θεσσαλονίκης. Βικιπαίδεια. (Greek Wikipedia).) (383)
- Venerable Eusebius the Recluse of Mount Coryphe near Antioch (4th century)
- Venerable Salamanes the Silent (Salamanes the Hesychast) of the Euphrates (c. 400)
- Venerable Mausimas the Syrian, Priest near Cyrrhus (before 423)
- The Holy Two Martyrs of Parium, near Cyzicus and Lampsacus, in Asia Minor.

== Pre-Schism Western saints ==
- Saint Emerentiana, a martyr in Rome (305) (Note: A martyr in Rome. Still only a catechumen, this foster-sister of St. Agnes was found by pagans praying at the tomb of the recently martyred Agnes and was stoned to death.)
- Saint Amasius of Teano, Bishop of Teano in central Italy (356) (Note: A Greek, driven from the East by the Arians, he became second Bishop of Teano in central Italy in 346.)
- Saint Paulinus the Merciful, Bishop of Nola (431)
- Saints Severian and Aquila, a husband and wife martyred in Julia Caesarea in Mauritania in North Africa.
- Saint Martyrius (Martory), a hermit in the Abruzzi in Italy (6th century)
- Saint Ormond (Armand), monk of the monastery of Saint Mairé in France, where he became abbot (6th century)
- Saint Ildefonsus (Alphonse, Alonzo), Archbishop of Toledo from 657 (667) (Note: "At Toledo, St. Ildefonsus, bishop, who, on account of his great purity of life, and his defense of the virginity of the Mother of God against the heretics who impugned it, received from her a brilliant white vestment, and being renowned for sanctity, was called to heaven.") (Note: Nephew of St. Eugene of Toledo in Spain. He knew St. Isidore of Seville and became a monk and Abbot of Agli on the Tagus near Toledo. He became Archbishop there in 657. He excelled as a writer, especially on the Mother of God.)
- Saint Colman of Lismore, Abbot of Lismore Abbey in Ireland and also a bishop (702)
- Saint Lüfthildis, a saint honoured near Cologne in Germany, where she lived as an anchoress (c. 850)
- Saint Maimbod (Mainboeuf), martyred by pagans while preaching to peasants near Kaltenbrunn in Alsace, now in France (c. 880)

== Post-Schism Orthodox saints ==
- Saint Dionysius of Olympus and Mount Athos (1541) (Note: See: (in Greek) Άγιος Διονύσιος ο εν Ολύμπω. Βικιπαίδεια. (Greek Wikipedia).)
- Venerable Gennadius of Kostroma (1565) (Note: See: (in Russian) Геннадий Костромской и Любимоградский. Википедии. (Russian Wikipedia).)
- Venerable Alexander, Abbot of Voche, near Galich, Kostroma Oblast (16th century) (see also: March 27)
- Saint Barlaam, founder of Chikoisk Monastery (ru), Siberia (1846)

=== New martyrs and confessors ===
- New Hieromartyr Seraphim Bulashov, Abbot of Holy Transfiguration Guslitsky Monastery (ru), Moscow (1938)
- New Hieromartyr Anatolius Grisjuk, Bishop of Odessa (1938) (Note: See: (in Russian) Анатолий (Грисюк). Википедии. (Russian Wikipedia).) (see also: January 10 - O.S.)
- New Virgin Martyrs Eudokia (Kuzminova), nun, and novice Ekaterina (Cherkasova) of Moscow (Note: See: (in Russian) Черкасова, Екатерина Михайловна. Википедии. (Russian Wikipedia).) (1938)
- New Virgin Martyr Militsa Kuvshinova of Moscow (1938)

== Other commemorations ==
- Commemoration of the Holy Fathers of the Sixth Ecumenical Council (680-681) (see also: September 14)
- Synaxis of the Saints of Kostroma. (Note: See: (in Russian) Собор Костромских святых. Википедии. (Russian Wikipedia).)
- Translation of the relics (1786) of Saint Theoctistus, Archbishop of Novgorod (1310)
- Repose of Abbot Damascene of Valaam Monastery (1881) (Note: "Abbot Damascene (1835-1881). January 25. In the direct line of Paisius Velichkovsky's disciples, Cleopas, Theodore and Euthymius, the humble Abbot Damascene was placed as head of Valaam, that Athos of the North, at the insistence of such a luminary as Bishop Ignatius Brianchaninov. Abbot Damascene fortified the eremitic life by building isolated sketes with an austere typicon which bore fruit an hundred fold for generations of great ascetics. Thus, Abbot Damascene is rightly called a builder of saints. He is also called a saint, as he has been known to appear from the other world to console and protect those who keep his memory. It is interesting to note that though he was a simple, uneducated man, Abbot Damascene possessed a great sense of appreciation of the arts; he encouraged artists, musicians and students to visit Valaam and create by being inspired by Valaam's natural beauty. The painters Shishkm, Aivazovsky, and the composer Tchaikovsky were among them. The latter, having been snowed-in on Valaam, had an opportunity to hearken to inspiration and wrote his first symphony, in which he depicted the blizzard and the freeze and thaw of the watery element. He entitled this work "Winter Dreams".")
- Repose of Archimandrite John Krestiankin of the Pskov-Caves Monastery (2006)

== Icon gallery ==
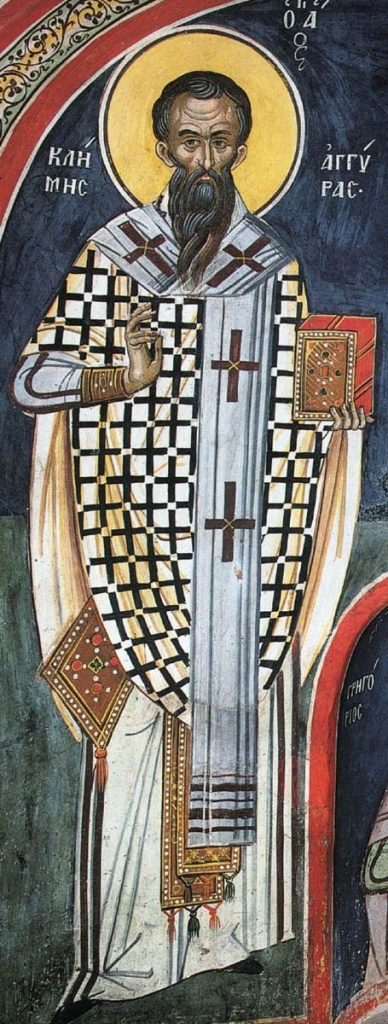
Hieromartyr Clement, Bishop of Ancyra.

Hieromartyr Clement, Bishop of Ancyra.
(Menologion of Basil II, 10th century).

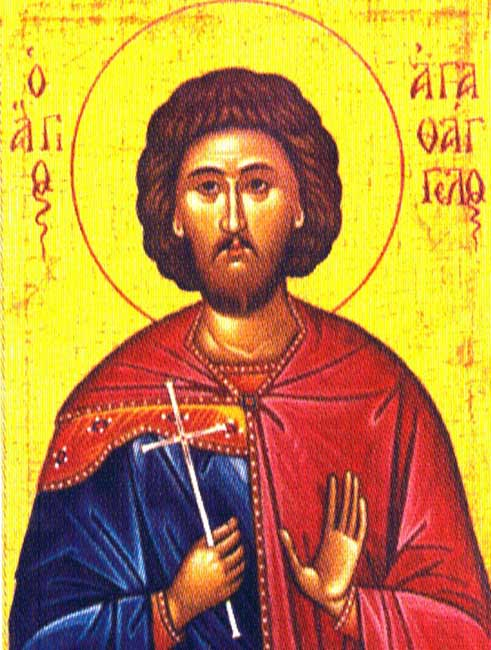
Martyr Agathangelus of Rome.

Martyr Agathangelus of Rome.
(Menologion of Basil II, 10th century).

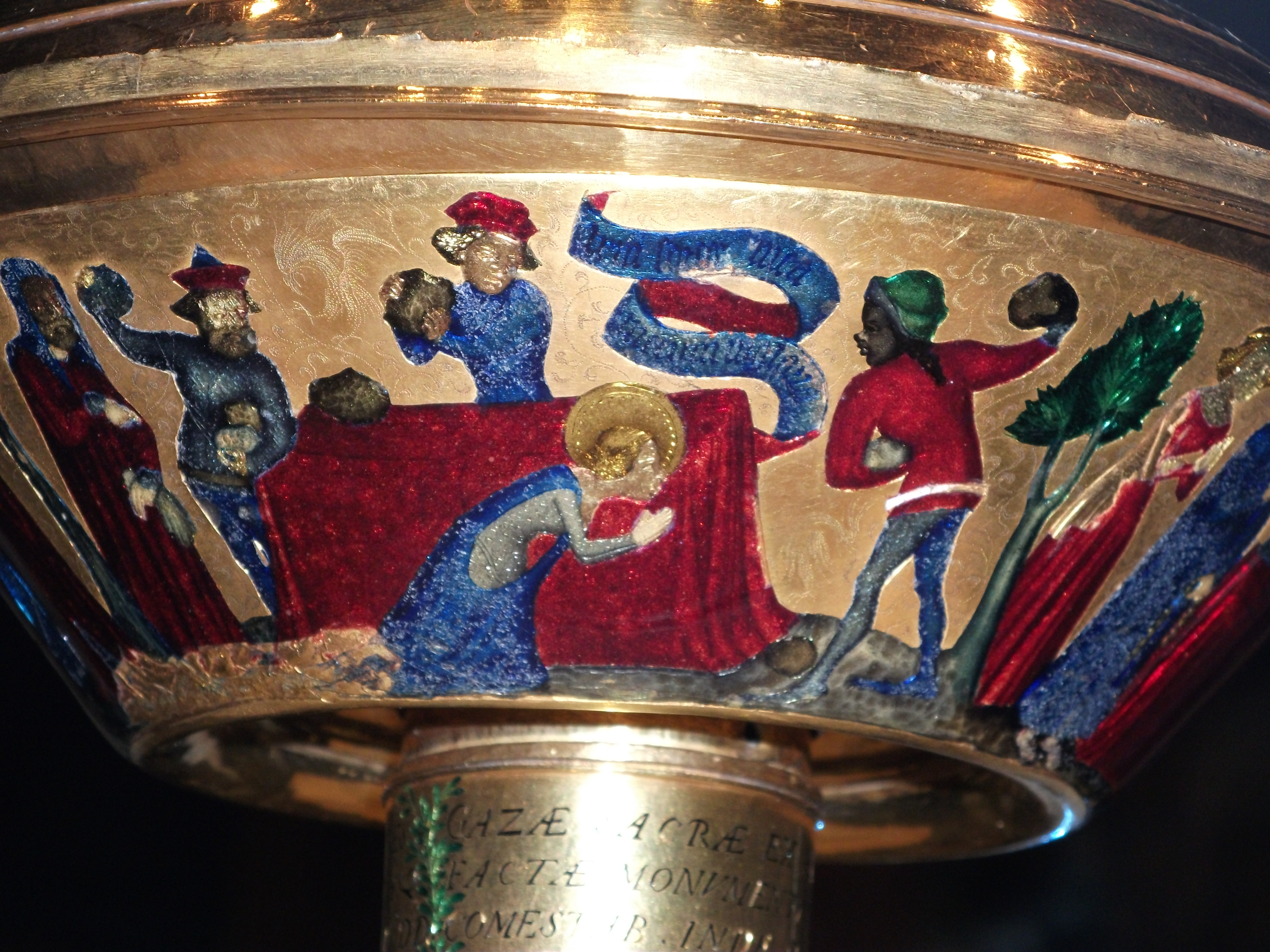
Emerentiana's likeness on the Royal Gold Cup (14th century).

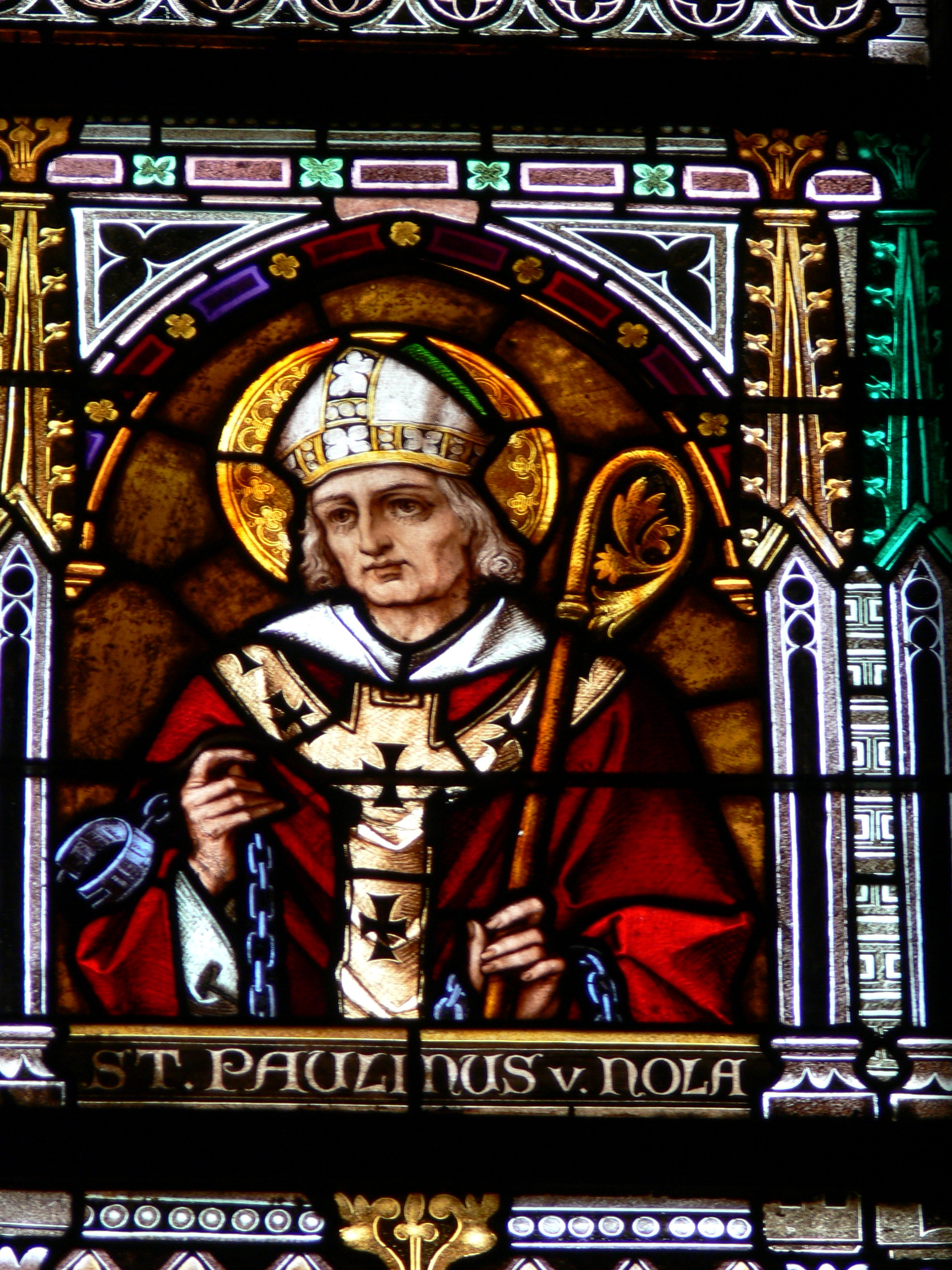
St. Paulinus the Merciful, Bishop of Nola.

Saint Ildefonsus, writing, with four monks.
(Parma Ildefonsus, c. 1100).

St. Dionysius of Olympus and Mount Athos.

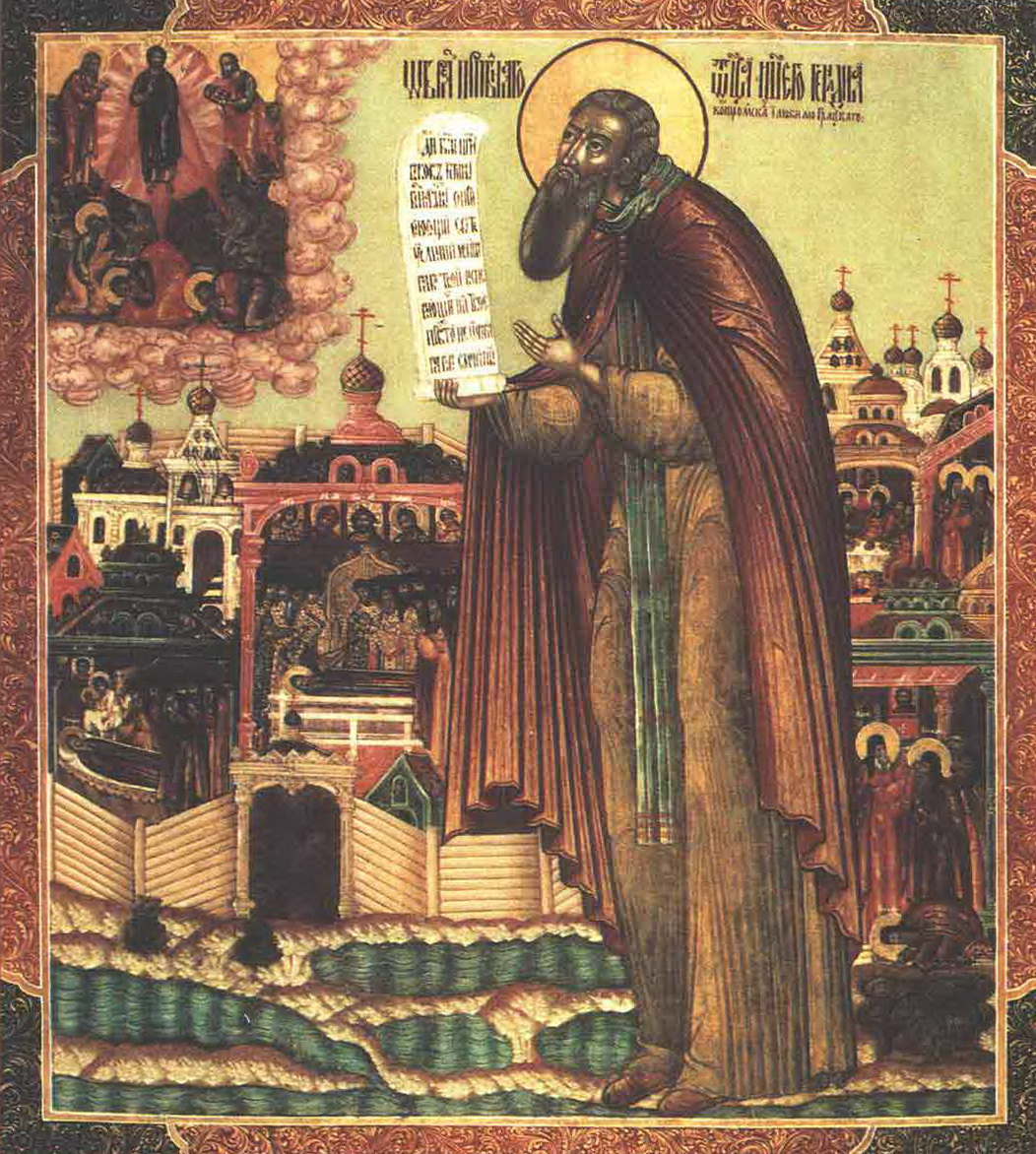
Venerable Gennadius of Kostroma.

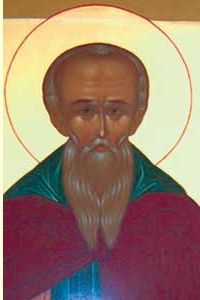
St. Barlaam of Chikoy.

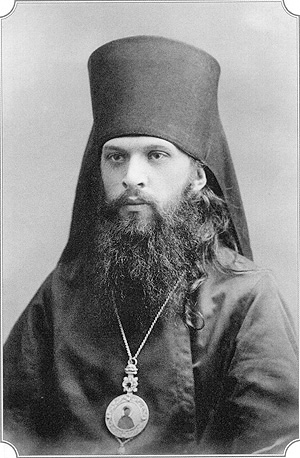
New Hieromartyr Anatolius (Grisjuk) of Odessa.

New Virgin Martyr Ekaterina Cherkasova of Moscow.

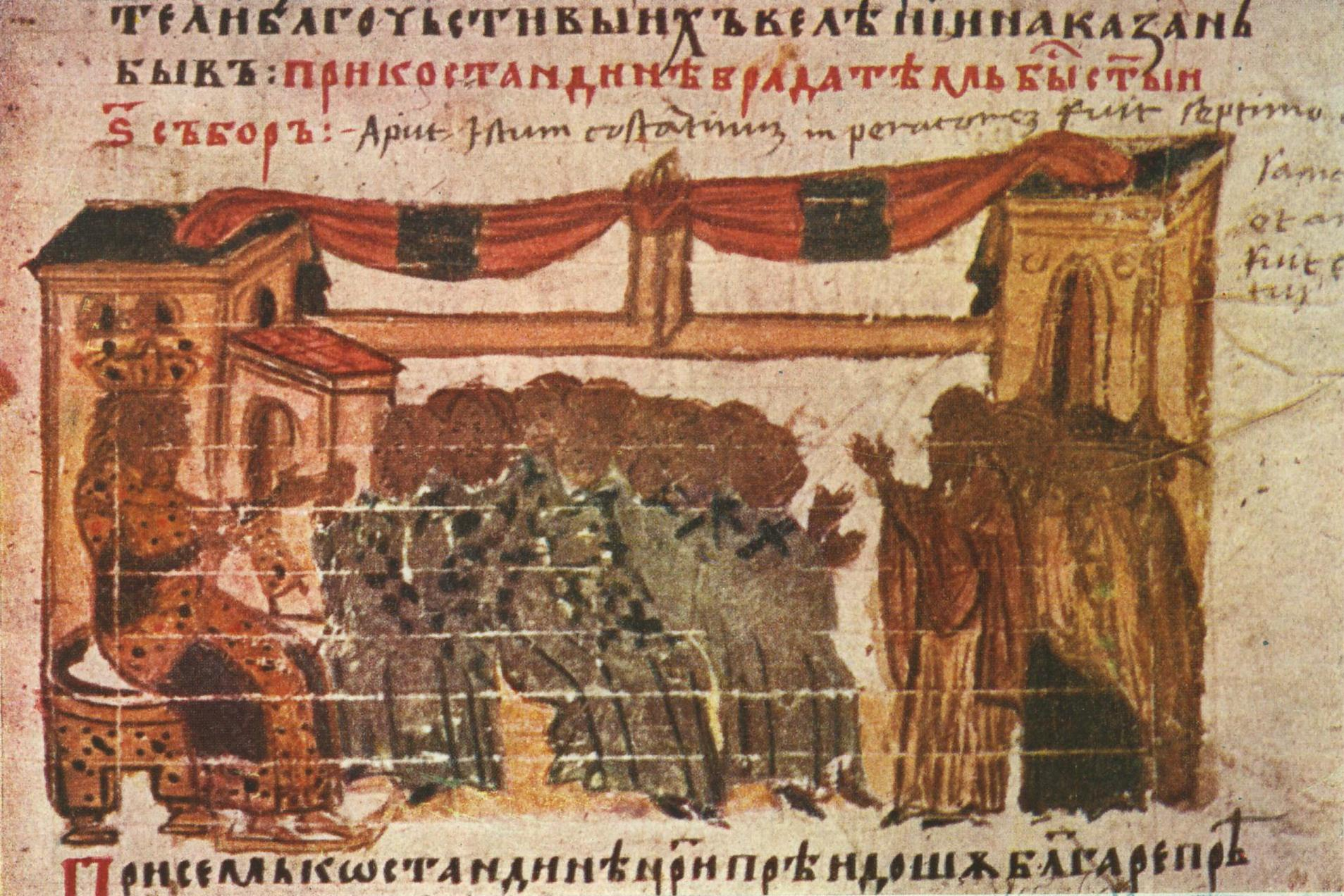
Sixth Ecumenical Council.
(Miniature, 14th century).

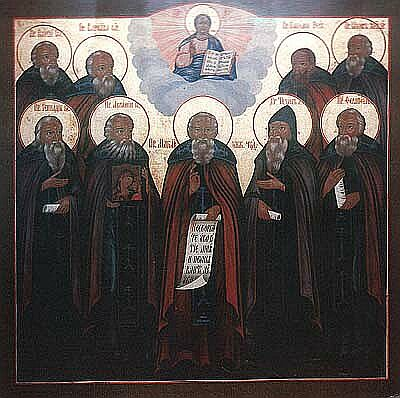
Synaxis of the Saints of Kostroma.

== Sources ==
- January 23 / February 5. Orthodox Calendar (PRAVOSLAVIE.RU).
- February 5 / January 23. HOLY TRINITY RUSSIAN ORTHODOX CHURCH (A parish of the Patriarchate of Moscow).
- January 23. OCA - The Lives of the Saints.
- The Autonomous Orthodox Metropolia of Western Europe and the Americas (ROCOR). St. Hilarion Calendar of Saints for the year of our Lord 2004. St. Hilarion Press (Austin, TX). p. 9.
- January 23. Latin Saints of the Orthodox Patriarchate of Rome.
- The Roman Martyrology. Transl. by the Archbishop of Baltimore. Last Edition, According to the Copy Printed at Rome in 1914. Revised Edition, with the Imprimatur of His Eminence Cardinal Gibbons. Baltimore: John Murphy Company, 1916. pp. 23–24.
- Rev. Richard Stanton. A Menology of England and Wales, or, Brief Memorials of the Ancient British and English Saints Arranged According to the Calendar, Together with the Martyrs of the 16th and 17th Centuries. London: Burns & Oates, 1892. pp. 33–34.

Greek Sources

- Great Synaxaristes: (in Greek) 23 ΙΑΝΟΥΑΡΙΟΥ. ΜΕΓΑΣ ΣΥΝΑΞΑΡΙΣΤΗΣ.
- (in Greek) Συναξαριστής. 23 Ιανουαρίου. ECCLESIA.GR. (H ΕΚΚΛΗΣΙΑ ΤΗΣ ΕΛΛΑΔΟΣ).

Russian Sources

- (in Russian) 5 февраля (23 января). Православная Энциклопедия под редакцией Патриарха Московского и всея Руси Кирилла (электронная версия). (Orthodox Encyclopedia - Pravenc.ru).
- (in Russian) 23 января (ст.ст.) 5 февраля 2013 (нов. ст.). Русская Православная Церковь Отдел внешних церковных связей. (DECR).
