= Hanaper =

Basket to contain a cup

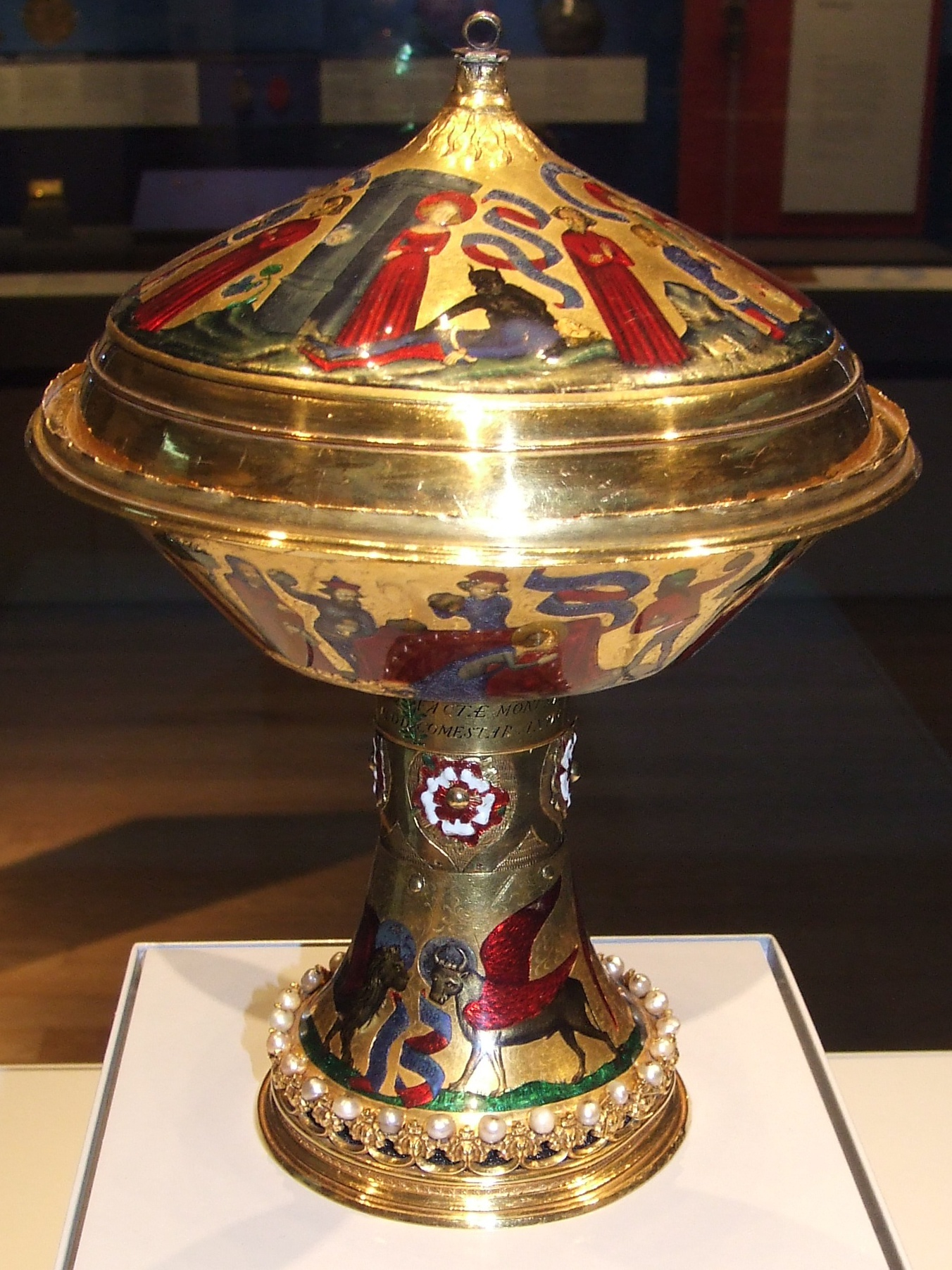
The Royal Gold Cup, 23.6 cm high, 17.8 cm across at its widest point; weight four pounds and 4.25 ounces, in the British Museum

A hanaper or hanap, properly a case or basket to contain a "hanap" (O. Eng. kneels: cf. Dutch nap), is a medieval cup or drinking vessel, a goblet with a foot or stem; the term is still used by antiquaries for medieval stemmed cups. The famous Royal Gold Cup in the British Museum is called a "hanap" in the inventory of Charles VI of France of 1391.

The word "hanaper" (Med. Lat. hanaperium) was used particularly in the English chancery of a wicker basket in which were kept writs and other documents.

From "hanaper" is derived the modern "hamper", a wicker or rush basket used for carrying game, fish, wine, etc. The verb " to hamper," to entangle, obstruct, hinder, especially used of disturbing the mechanism of a lock or other fastening so as to prevent its proper working, is of doubtful origin. It is probably connected with a root seen in the Icel. hemja, to restrain, and Ger. hemmen, to clog.

For another usage, see Alienation Office.

== Clerk of the Hanaper ==
Clerk of the Hanaper became an office in the department of the chancery, now abolished. The clerk, also known as warden of the hanaper, was paid fees and other moneys for the sealing of charters, patents, writs, etc., and from which issued certain writs under the great seal. The British office was abolished in 1852. In Ireland the office of the Clerk of the Crown and Hanaper within the Irish Chancery persisted until 1922.
