= Emerentiana =

Christian martyr

Saint Emerentiana
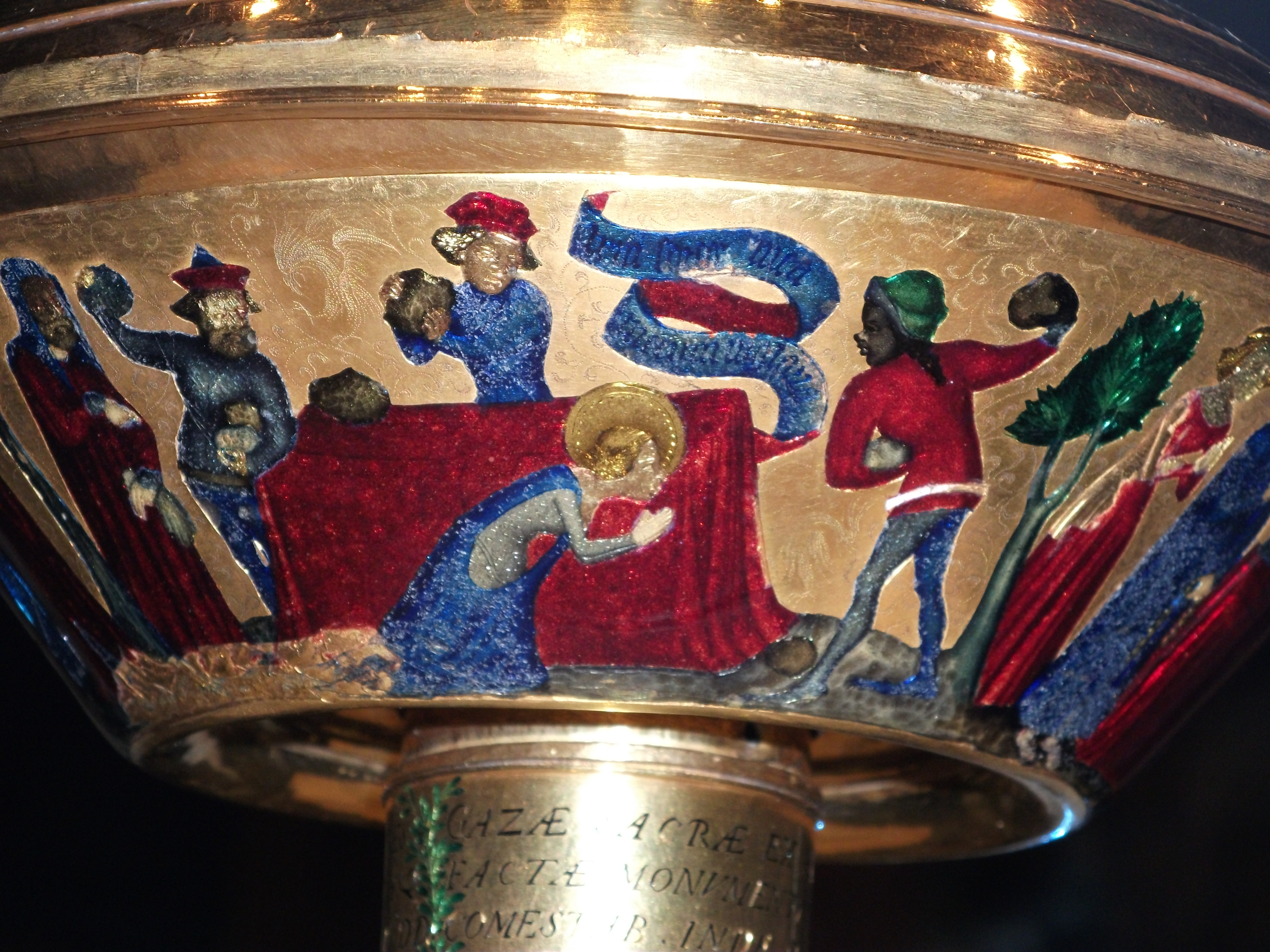
- Emerentiana's likeness on the Royal Gold Cup

Virgin and martyr
- Died: circa 304; Rome, Roman Empire
- Venerated in: Catholic Church; Eastern Orthodoxy, including Antiochian Orthodox Church
- Canonized: Pre-Congregation
- Major shrine: Basilica of Sant'Agnese fuori le mura, Rome, Italy
- Feast: 23 January
- Attributes: young woman with stones in her lap and lilies in her hand; young lady being stoned to death
- Patronage: stomach problems

Emerentiana (Italian: Emerenziana) was a Roman virgin and martyr, who lived around the start of the 4th century. Her feast day is 23 January.

== Legend ==
According to the legend of Agnes of Rome, Emerentiana was her foster sister. Agnes was a rich Roman heiress who was martyred after refusing an engagement due to her Christian religion. Emerentiana's mother was the wet nurse and nanny of Agnes.

A few days after Agnes' death, Emerentiana, who was a catechumen still learning about Christianity before being officially baptised, went to the tomb to pray and was suddenly attacked by the pagans. Having professed her faith and acknowledged her relationship to Agnes, she was stoned to death by the crowd. In this way, she can be considered to have undergone a baptism of desire, or a baptism of blood, according to the tenets of the Catholic Church.

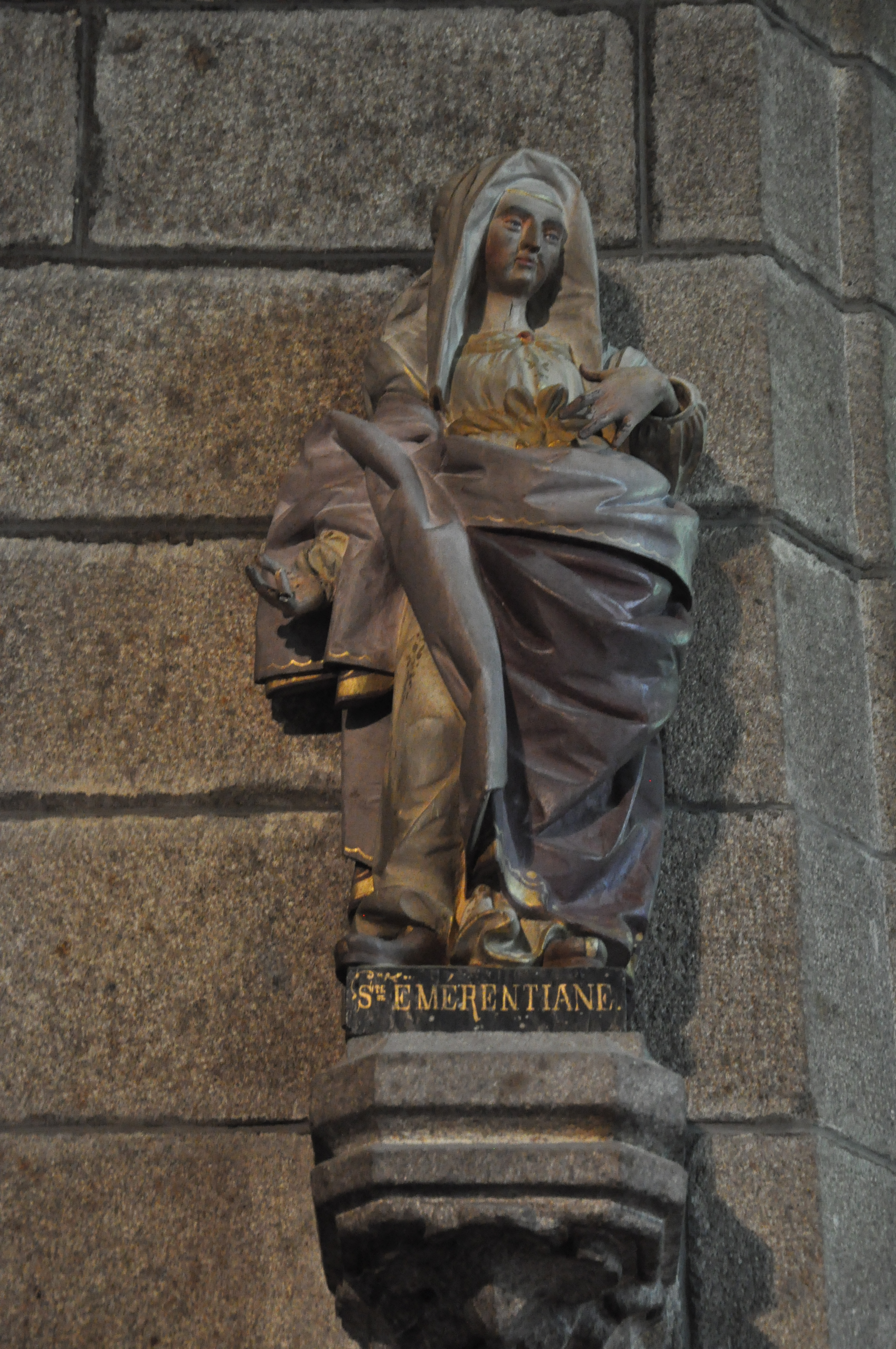
Emerentiana with stones in her lap

== Veneration ==
There was a real Roman martyr named Emerentiana, whose cultus is very ancient, as attested by the martyrologies of Jerome, Bede, and others, but not even the date of her death is known. In the nineteenth century her crypt in the catacombs was discovered by Mariano Armellini. Her feast day is 23 January. Formerly, in the martyrology of Jerome, her feast was commemorated on 16 September. Her cult has been confined to local calendars since 1969.

She is represented as a young girl who either has stones in her lap and lilies in her hand, or as being stoned to death by a mob. Her tomb is in the church of Sant'Agnese fuori le mura in Rome. An altar dedicated to her with a marble relief by Ercole Ferrata depicting her martyrdom is in Sant'Agnese in Agone.

She is invoked against colic and stomach ache.

== Popular culture ==
Emerentiana had a tiny cameo role in Cardinal Nicholas Wiseman's novel, Fabiola, where she is seen mourning for Agnes right after the latter's martyrdom.

== See also ==
- Calendar of saints
- January 23 (Eastern Orthodox liturgics)
- Roman Martyrology
