= Clement of Ancyra =

Ancient Roman bishop and saint

Saint Clement of Ancyra
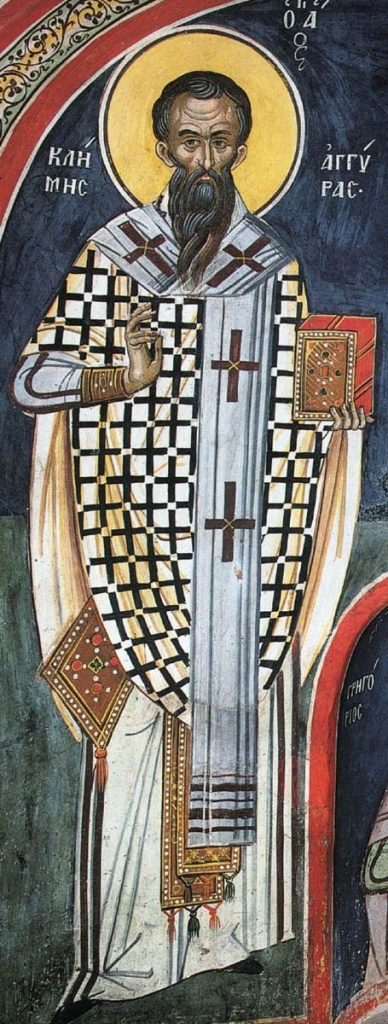
- Fresco of Saint Clement of Ancyra
- Born: c. 258; Ancyra (modern-day Ankara, Turkey)
- Died: 312; Rome (modern-day Italy)
- Venerated in: Roman Catholic Church; Orthodox Church; Oriental Orthodox Church
- Feast: 23 January (Gregorian calendar), 5 February (Julian calendar)

Clement of Ancyra (Greek: Κλήμης; c. 258 – 312) was a bishop who served during the rule of Roman emperor Diocletian. He was arrested by Roman authorities and tried by Diocletian. Emperor Diocletian attempted to convert Clement to Paganism but Clement refused and withstood tremendous torture. Clement was eventually beheaded by a Roman soldier whilst he was celebrating the Divine Liturgy in the year 312. He is venerated on 23 January according to the Gregorian calendar and on 5 February according to the civil or Gregorian calendar equivalent of 23 January in the Julian calendar by Orthodox Christians keeping this calendar, which includes all of them in some countries and traditionalist Orthodox Christians including Genuine or Authentic Orthodox Christians, True Orthodox Christians and Catacomb Orthodox Christians everywhere, together with his disciple Agathangelus of Rome.

Clement's relics are on the saint's altar in the basilica of Our Lady of Trapani in Trapani.

The Saint Clement Church is the only surviving structure from the Byzantine era in Ankara.
