= Agathangelus of Rome =

Christian martyr saint

Saint Agathangelus of Rome
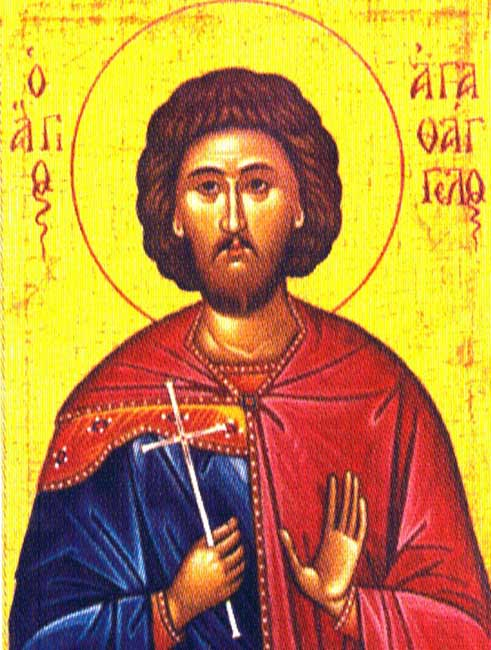
- An icon of Saint Agathangelus

Martyr
- Died: c. 312; Ancyra (modern-day Ankara, Turkey)
- Venerated in: Roman Catholic Church; Eastern Orthodox Church; Oriental Orthodox Church
- Feast: January 23 (Gregorian calendar); February 5 (Julian calendar)

Saint Agathangelus of Rome (died 312), was a Roman deacon and disciple of Clement of Ancyra, was a martyr during the reign of emperor Diocletian. He met Clement when the latter was imprisoned in Rome, and traveled back to Ancyra with him where they were both beheaded. According to the Gregorian calendar, his and Clement's feast day is on January 23 but on February 5 according to the Julian calendar which is used in some Eastern Orthodox countries.
