= Saint Ormond =

St. Ormond was a French abbot and prelate. He was elected in 587 AD abbot of Saint Maire, in France. He was a great patron of monastic expansion in France and Europe. His feast day is January 23.
