= Royal Gold Cup =

14th-century decorated gold cup made for the French royal family

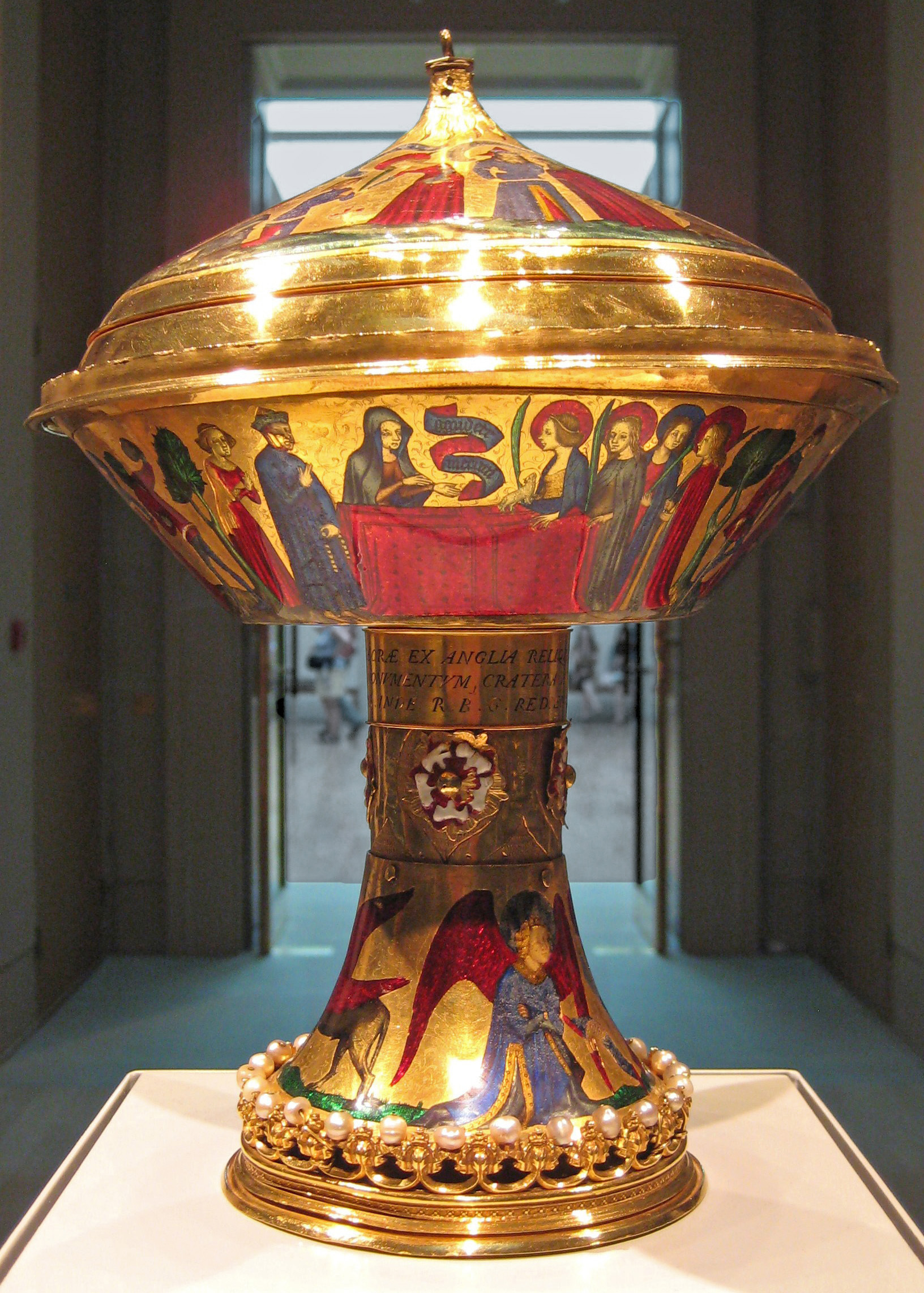
The Royal Gold Cup, 23.6 cm high, 17.8 cm across at its widest point; weight 1.935 kg, British Museum. Saint Agnes appears to her friends in a vision.

The Royal Gold Cup or Saint Agnes Cup is a solid gold covered cup lavishly decorated with enamel and pearls. It was made for the French royal family at the end of the 14th century, and later belonged to several English monarchs before spending nearly 300 years in Spain. It has been in the British Museum since 1892, where it is normally on display in Room 40, and is generally agreed to be the outstanding surviving example of late medieval French plate. It has been described as "the one surviving royal magnificence of the International Gothic age". According to Thomas Hoving, former Director of the Metropolitan Museum of Art in New York, "of all the princely jewels and gold that have come down to us, this is the most spectacular—and that includes the great royal treasures."

The cup is made of solid gold, stands 23.6 cm (9.25 inches) high with a diameter of 17.8 cm (6.94 inches) at its widest point, and weighs 1.935 kg (4.26 lb). It has a cover that lifts off, but the triangular stand on which it once stood is now lost. The stem of the cup has twice been extended by the addition of cylindrical bands, so that it was originally much shorter, giving the overall shape "a typically robust and stocky elegance." The original decorated knop or finial on the cover has been lost, and a moulding decorated with 36 pearls has been removed from the outer edge of the cover; a strip of gold with jagged edges can be seen where it was attached. Presumably it matched the one still in place round the foot of the cup.

The gold surfaces are decorated with scenes in basse-taille enamel with translucent colours that reflect light from the gold beneath; many areas of gold both underneath the enamel and in the background have engraved and pointillé decoration worked in the gold. In particular the decoration features large areas of translucent red, which have survived in excellent condition. This colour, known as rouge clair, was the most difficult to achieve technically, and highly prized for this and the brilliance of the colour when it was done successfully. Scenes from the life of Saint Agnes run round the top of the cover and the sloping underside of the main body. The symbols of the Four Evangelists run round the foot of the cup, and there are enamel medallions at the centre of the inside of both the cup and the cover. The lower of the two added bands contains enamel Tudor roses on a diapered pointillé background; this was apparently added under Henry VIII. The upper band has an engraved inscription filled in with black enamel, with a barrier of laurel branches in green to mark off the end of the inscription from its beginning.

The cup came to the British Museum with a custom-made hexagonal case of leather on a wood frame, with iron lock, handles and mounts. This was either made at the same time or soon after the cup, and has incised and stamped foliate decoration and a blackletter inscription: YHE.SUS.O.MARYA.O.MARYA YHE SUS.

== Provenance ==
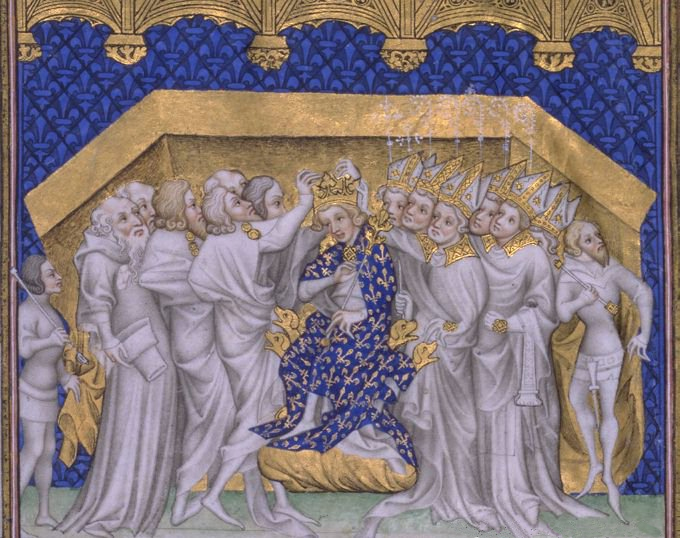
The coronation of Charles VI of France in 1380

There is no firm evidence as to the date and circumstances of the creation of the cup. It is first clearly documented in an inventory from 1391 of the valuables belonging to Charles VI of France (reigned 1380–1422), surviving in two copies in the Bibliothèque nationale de France. This lists:

A hanap of gold, all its cover well and richly enamelled on the outside with the life of Madame St Agnes; and the cresting of the foot is garnished with 26 pearls, and the crown around the cover with 36 pearls; and the finial of the said cover (is) garnished with four sapphires, three balas rubies and fifteen pearls. And it weighs 9 marcs 3 ounces of gold. and the said hanap rests on a stand of gold in the form of a tripod, and in the middle of the tripod is represented Our Lady in a sun on a ground of clear red, and the three feet of the tripod are formed by three winged dragons. The said hanap and cover were given to the king by monseigneur the duc de Berry on his journey into Touraine in the year 91.

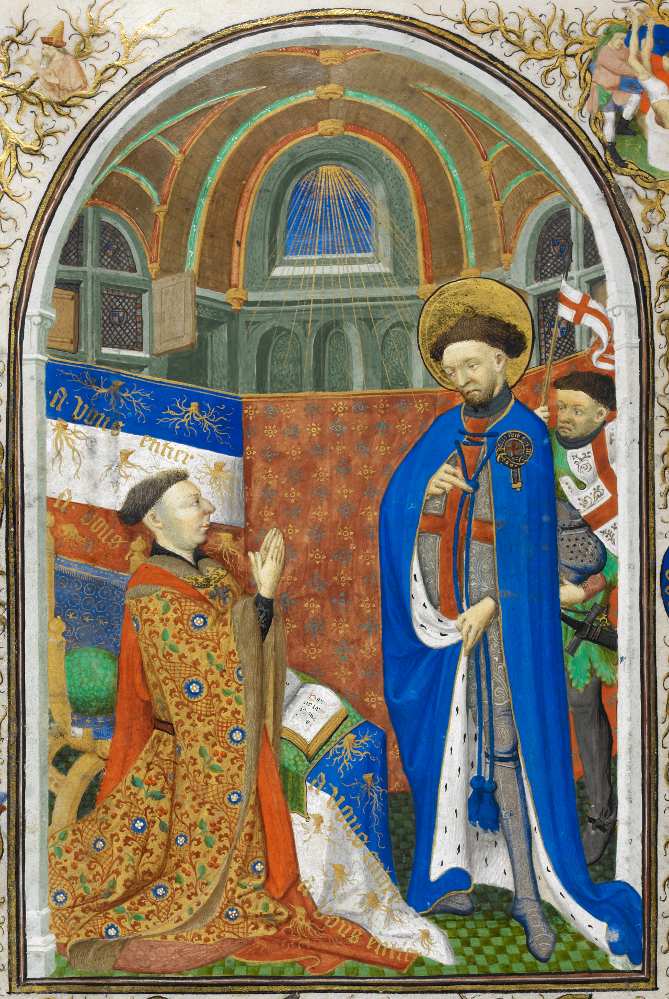
John of Lancaster, 1st Duke of Bedford, kneeling, was the first English owner of the cup. Detail from a miniature by the Bedford Master

John, Duke of Berry (1340–1416) was Charles VI's uncle and a powerful figure in the kingdom, as well as the most famous and extravagant collector and commissioner of art of his day. He is still best known for commissioning the Très Riches Heures du Duc de Berry, the famous International Gothic illuminated manuscript, and also commissioned the Holy Thorn Reliquary, now in the British Museum. The young King Charles had been forced to remove his uncle from governorships after the latter's rapacious conduct had led to unrest, and the meeting in 1391 marked their reconciliation after a period of bad relations. Lavish gifts among the Valois court circle were routine, and on this occasion Berry had special reason to be generous.

The cup appears in another inventory of Charles VI in 1400, and then is not recorded until it appears as the property of another royal uncle, and collector, John of Lancaster, 1st Duke of Bedford (1389–1435), son of Henry IV, who was briefly Regent of both France and England for his infant nephew Henry VI. How he acquired the cup is not known, but he would have received many gifts from Charles VI, and had both lent the king money and bought from him things such as the library of the Palais du Louvre, in the uneasy period when Charles had made peace with the English and made Henry V his heir. After the death of his brother Henry V, Bedford struggled to stem the resurgent French resistance, which was energised by Joan of Arc. He died in Normandy in 1435, leaving Henry VI as his heir.

The cup is more briefly described as the first item in a list of valuables received from Bedford's estate prepared for Henry VI's minister Cardinal Henry Beaufort, but the tripod is not mentioned, some of the jewels are missing, and the subject is misidentified as the life of Saint Suzanna not Saint Agnes. For some reason it does not appear in a royal inventory of 1441; Jenny Stratford suggests that this was because Beaufort still had it at this point. Another possibility is that it had been pawned, as it was in 1449 and again in 1451, on both occasions to finance England's increasingly unsuccessful efforts to hold on to French territory;

The cup first appears in the records of the new Tudor dynasty under Henry VIII in 1521. By now the cover had lost the finial "garnished with four sapphires, three balas rubies and fifteen pearls" described in Charles VI's inventory and had a new one of gold in the form of a closed, or "imperial" crown. This matches a propaganda drive at this time by Henry to assert England as an "empire", a contemporary sense meaning a state recognising no superior, though the Great Seal of England had already used a closed crown since 1471. Other uses had probably been found for the jewels of the old finial; it is assumed that the lower band with the Tudor roses was added in Henry's reign, as part of a programme of adding Tudor badges to possessions inherited from earlier dynasties, which covered tapestries, illuminated manuscripts and buildings such as King's College Chapel in Cambridge. The cup is described in inventories in 1532 and after Henry's death in 1547, and then under Elizabeth I it was inventoried in 1574 and 1596.

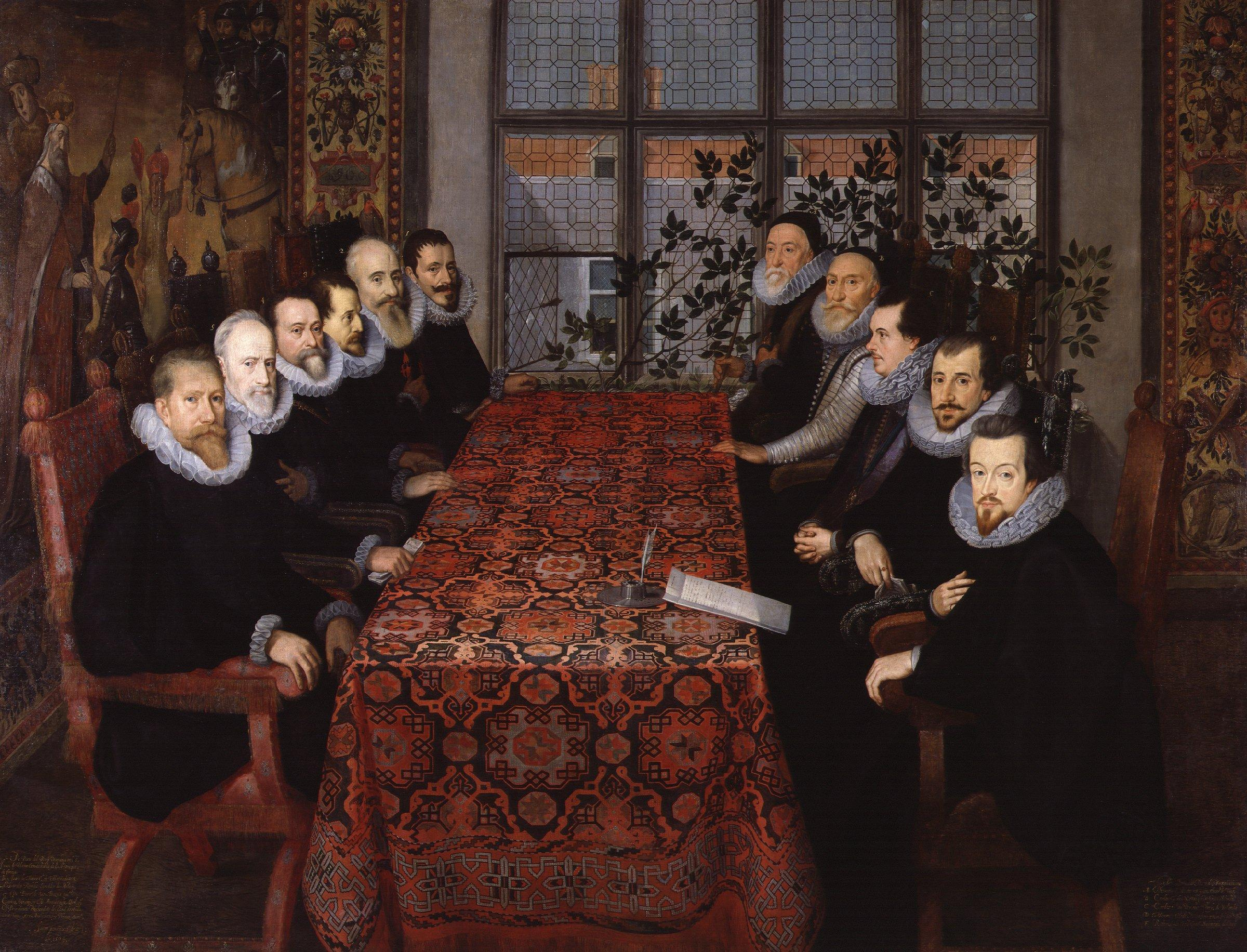
The Somerset House Conference representatives in August 1604; Spanish on the left, English on the right. The Constable of Castile is nearest the window on the left.

When James I succeeded to the English throne in 1603, one of his first priorities was to end the Anglo-Spanish War, which had been dragging on since 1585. A Spanish delegation arrived for the Somerset House Conference, which concluded with a treaty signed in 1604. The leader of the Habsburg diplomats was Juan Fernández de Velasco, 5th Duke of Frías and Constable of Castile. The upper extension to the stem of the cup has a Latin inscription that translates as:

This cup of solid gold, a relic of the sacred treasure of England and a memorial to the peace made between the kings, the Constable Juan de Velasco, returning thence after successfully accomplishing his mission, presented as an offering to Christ the Peacemaker.

The gift of "some 70 items of silver and gold plate" by James to the Constable, of which the cup was the most notable item, is documented on both the English and Spanish sides; the Constable wrote an account of his mission on his return, which mentions the gift from James. The Constable had previously presented both James and the queen with elaborate cups, among other valuable gifts. According to Pauline Croft, "With his usual over-generosity the king gave the departing envoys around half the large gold vessels from the royal possessions he had inherited from Elizabeth. The Constable himself received a stupendous gift of plate, including possibly the most venerable item in the collection, known as "the Royal Gold Cup of the Kings of France and England."

In 1610 the Constable gave the cup to a convent in Medina de Pomar, near Burgos, as the inscription describes. His deed of gift survives, and records that the gift was on condition that the cup was never alienated by the convent. A marginal note on the deed, in the Constable's own handwriting, records that he had obtained the permission of the Archbishop of Toledo, Bernardo de Sandoval y Rojas, for the cup to be used as a ciborium, or container for consecrated hosts. By this period a rule of the church normally forbade the use of vessels decorated on their inner surface as ciboria.

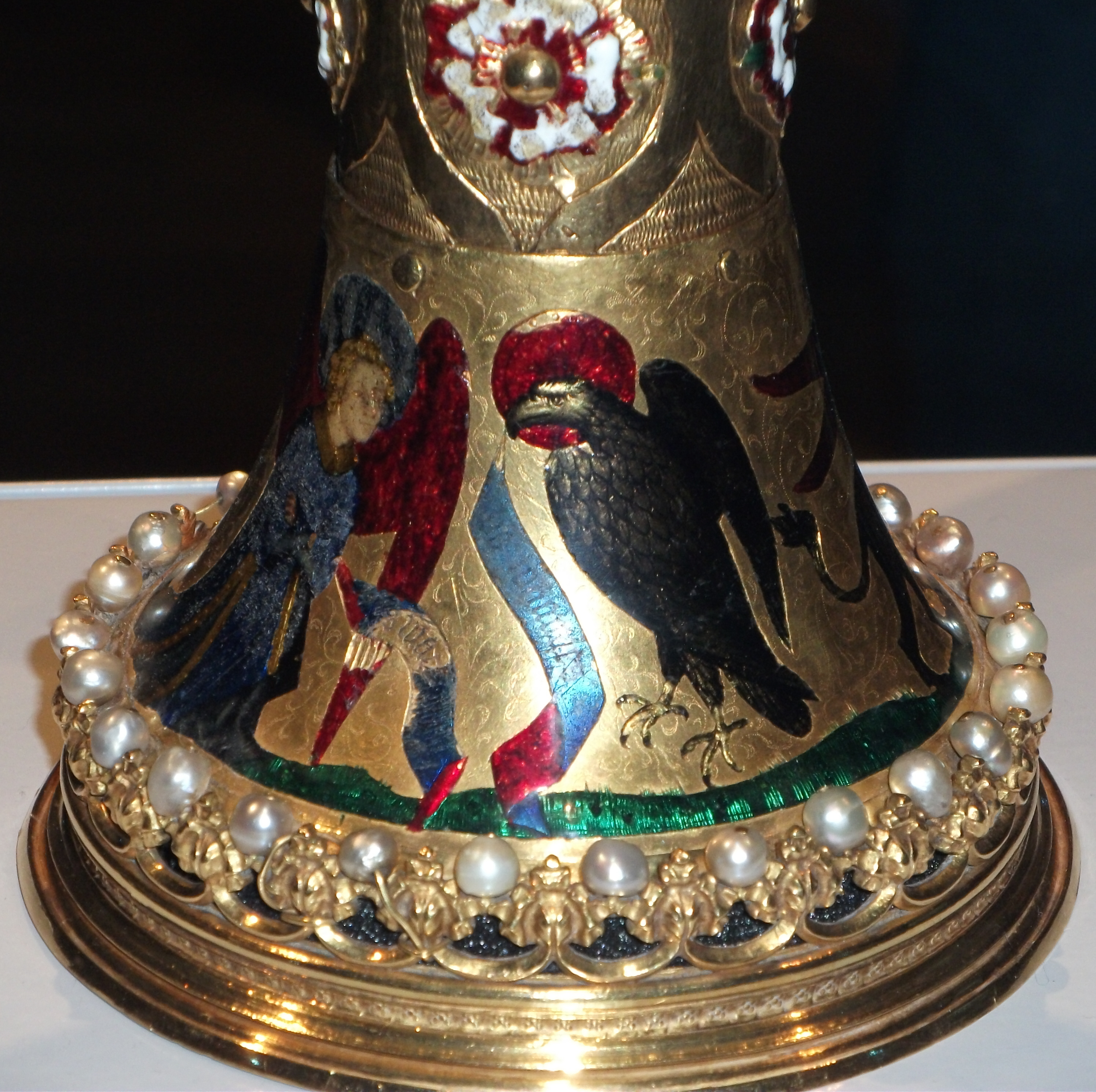
The foot of the cup

The cup stayed in the convent until 1882 when the nuns were short of funds and wanted to sell it. It was at some point during this period that the pearl border to the cover and the Tudor finial were removed. The nuns decided they would get a better price in Paris than in Spain, and the cup was entrusted to Simon Campo, a priest, who took it to Paris and approached several leading dealers and collectors. There had been a spate of forgeries of medieval objects, and the Parisians were suspicious, until one, Baron Jérôme Pichon, researched the second added cylinder and was sufficiently convinced that this was the cup documented in 1604 to make a rather low offer, which was accepted. In the course of his researches the baron had contacted the current Duke of Frías, who had supplied useful information, and then initially congratulated the buyer on his purchase. However, on looking further into the matter the duke realized that the sale was contrary to the 1610 deed of gift he had discovered in the family archives, and sued in the French courts to recover the cup.

The Duke eventually lost his case in 1891, enabling a further sale that had been set up by Baron Pichon to proceed. This was to the leading firm of Messrs. Wertheimer of Bond Street in London, where the cup was seen by Augustus Wollaston Franks, who had been Keeper of British and Mediaeval Antiquities and Ethnography at the British Museum since 1866, and was president of the Society of Antiquaries. Samson Wertheimer agreed "with much public spirit" to sell the cup to the British Museum for the £8,000 (£ 880,000 in 2025) it had cost the firm. Franks was worried by the new American collectors such as J. P. Morgan, and in 1891 wrote to Sir Henry Tate, of Tate Gallery fame: "A very wonderful gold cup has appeared returned to this country after an absence of 287 years, and I am anxious to see it placed in the National Museum and not removed to America."

Franks tried to get wealthy individuals to subscribe £500 (£ 55,000 in 2025) each, but even with a grant of £2,000 from HM Treasury could not raise the price. He was forced to put up £5,000 of his own money temporarily while he continued to try to get smaller amounts from others, and succeeded in 1892 when the Treasury agreed to contribute the final £830; "to Franks this was his greatest acquisition, and the one of which he was most proud." Apart from the Treasury, the £500 contributors were Franks and Wertheimer, the Worshipful Company of Goldsmiths, Charles Drury Edward Fortnum, the Duke of Northumberland, Lord Savile, Lord Iveagh and the Earl of Crawford. In 1901 Morgan succeeded in buying the Lindau Gospels in London, which the museum had also wanted.

== Creation, context and survival ==
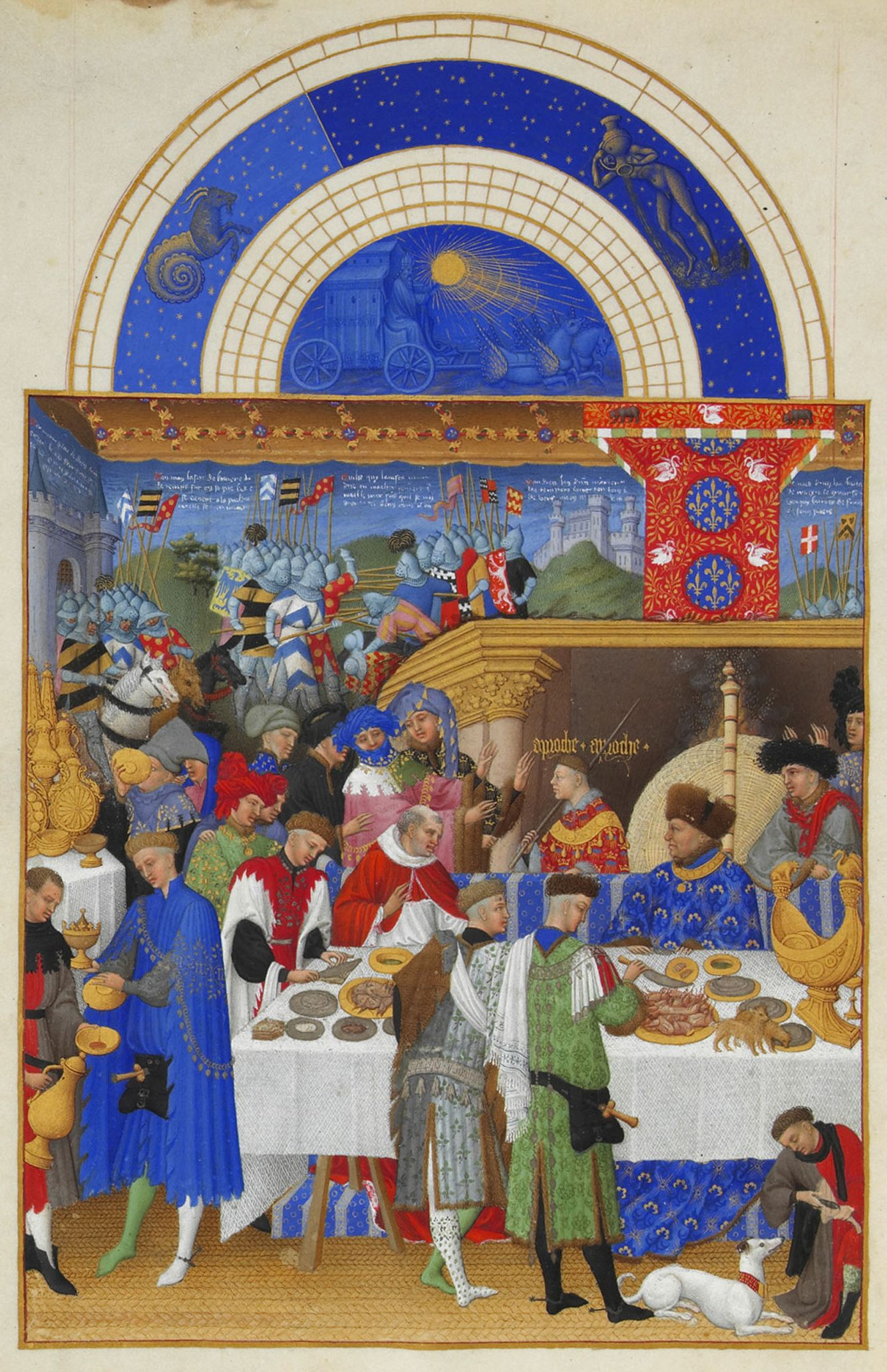
Berry at a feast for New Year, when gifts were exchanged among his court. To the left there is a buffet displaying plate, and two courtiers beside it seem to be comparing gifts. January from the calendar of Les Très Riches Heures du duc de Berry, by the Limbourg Brothers.

Much the most prominent decoration on the cup is the cycle of scenes from the life of Saint Agnes, which is rarely depicted in such detail in art. However, there was one outstanding devotee of the saint in the period: King Charles V of France, Berry's older brother and Charles VI's father. Charles V was born in 1338 on Saint Agnes' feast day, January 21, and is recorded as owning at least 13 works of art featuring her, including a different gold cup enamelled with scenes from her life (both are recorded in the 1391 inventory). Until recent decades the generally accepted hypothesis was that Berry ordered the cup as a present for his brother in 1380, to be ready for his birthday in January 1381. When the king died in September 1380, Berry had retained it for a decade before presenting it to Charles VI.

However, in 1978 Ronald Lightbown, Keeper of Metalwork at the V&A Museum, rejected this theory on stylistic grounds, considering that the cup must have been created only shortly before it appeared in Charles VI's inventory in 1391. He says that "in 1380 figure-style was a softly undulating, flowing style, with slender elongated figures and much use of serpentine or curving folds in the drapery, and with trailing dresses ending in sinuous Gothic hem-lines" —a style that can be seen in the miniature of the coronation of Charles VI in 1380 illustrated above. In contrast, Lightbown says "the figures on the cup are broad, some might even be called stocky, with soft drapery of cylindrical form, or of smooth, tight outlines. The folds are tubular and the hems of the robes are straight with no waving, trailing outlines. The style in fact is the 'Italianate' manner which developed in France as a result of contact with 'trecento' art, and not the purely Northern Gothic International manner." This view was rejected in 1981 by Neil Stratford, former Keeper of Medieval and Later Antiquities at the British Museum, who pointed to a number of manuscript illuminations in a similar style that date from earlier than 1390. John Cherry, another former Keeper of the medieval collections at the British Museum, still presents the older dating in a work of 2010, and the British Museum website dates the cup to "about 1370–1380".

Another traditional assumption, based on the language of the inventories and shared by almost all writers, was that the cup was a piece of secular plate, for use at table, or display on a buffet beside it. The buffet of the period was more like a modern Welsh dresser or shop display unit, with receding shelves for displaying on important occasions all the plate of the household that was not in use. Neil Stratford suggests that the cup was only used to drink from on special occasions, including St Agnes' feast day, while Lightbown remarks that at over four pounds in weight the cup is much too heavy to drink from conveniently. However John Cherry, noting the exclusively religious subjects depicted (including that on the lost tripod stand) considers that the cup may have been intended as a ciborium from the start. It might have been used either to accompany in its carrying case the duke on his tours of his many castles and palaces, or perhaps for his foundation of the Saint Chapelle at his capital of Bourges, intended to rival the king's Sainte-Chapelle in Paris and his brother's foundation at Champmol in Dijon.

The four sons of King John II of France—Charles V, Louis I, Duke of Anjou (1339–1384), Berry and Philip the Bold, Duke of Burgundy (1342–1404)—all spent huge sums on works in gold and silver, as well as on other works of art. Although it is Berry who is especially remembered as a patron, partly because he specialized in illuminated manuscripts which have little value in their materials, it was his brother Louis of Anjou who was the "most passionately interested in the goldsmith's art"; he had over 3,000 pieces of plate at one point. These included wholly secular pieces with sculptures in enamel that can only be imagined by comparison: in terms of technique to the handful of reliquaries, like the British Museum's Holy Thorn Reliquary, that have survived from the period, and in terms of subject matter to tapestries and illuminations. However, in 1381 Anjou melted down almost all his plate to finance a war to pursue his claim to the Kingdom of Naples. According to the sculptor and goldsmith Lorenzo Ghiberti, writing seventy years later, one of Anjou's goldsmiths, called Gusmin and "a most skillful sculptor, of great talent", was so affected by the destruction of his life's work that he joined an eremitic monastic order and lived out his days in silence.

The Royal Gold Cup was "probably not exceptional as to size or decoration" in this milieu; once "but one member of a class, it now stands alone". An inventory of Charles V records 25 gold cups weighing between five and fifteen marcs; this is slightly over nine without its stand. Smaller gold cups are recorded in sets of a dozen, of which Charles V had three. The largest items were the great table ornaments, in the shape of ships, called nefs, of which Charles V had five, the heaviest weighing over 53 marcs.

Berry died in 1416 with no male heir, and deeply in debt. Those of his works in precious metal and jewels that had not already gone to his creditors were mostly seized by the English when they took Paris in July 1417. This was the first of a number of periods that saw the large-scale destruction of goldsmiths' work that the cup escaped, but thousands of other pieces did not, a survival that Brigitte Buettner finds "almost miraculous". In particular, the move to Spain in 1604 enabled it to avoid the dispersal and destruction of the English Crown Jewels and royal collection of plate under the English Commonwealth.

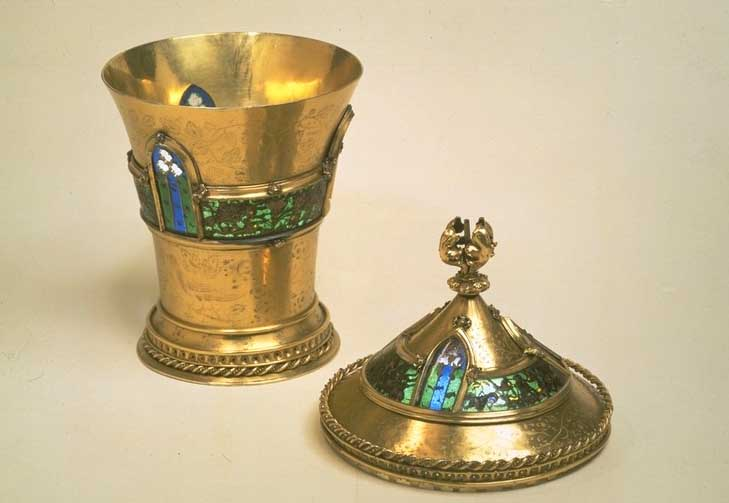
The silver-gilt Mérode Cup, about 1400 (V&A Museum)

As a secular piece the cup would be an almost unique survival at this level of quality, "the one representative left to us of medieval secular plate in its most sumptuous development". Although French plate in silver and gold was made in great quantities, and at a high level of quality, "French silver made prior to the early 19th century is probably scarcer than that of any other European country." The cost of even very skilled labour was low compared to that of the materials, and in the absence of any reliable way of either depositing or investing money, it was turned into lavish objects, in the knowledge that it might well need to be sold or melted down to finance some future project. If it survived long enough to become old-fashioned it was likely to be melted down and remodelled in a new style.

There are only four other known survivals, secular or religious, of basse taille enamel on gold, one the small Salting Reliquary, also in the British Museum, and none as fine as the cup. The "King John Cup" in King's Lynn, of ca. 1340, silver-gilt with transparent enamel, is the best example of basse-taille work probably made in England; the metalwork expert Herbert Maryon describes this and the Royal Gold Cup as the "two examples of outstanding merit, unsurpassed in any collection." However it is unclear if most of the enamel at King's Lynn is original. The closest comparison to the Royal Gold Cup is perhaps the silver-gilt Mérode Cup of about 1400, which is the only surviving medieval example of plique á jour enamel, a difficult technique which creates a see-through effect like stained glass. A silver-gilt cup in the Rijksmuseum, Amsterdam of before 1376 has no enamels or gems, and a different shape, but offers an interesting comparison as it has a tripod stand with winged grotesques as legs, a short stem, and the cover has both an elaborate finial and a raised decorated strip around the rim, so that all the altered aspects of the Royal Gold Cup are present.

== Iconography ==
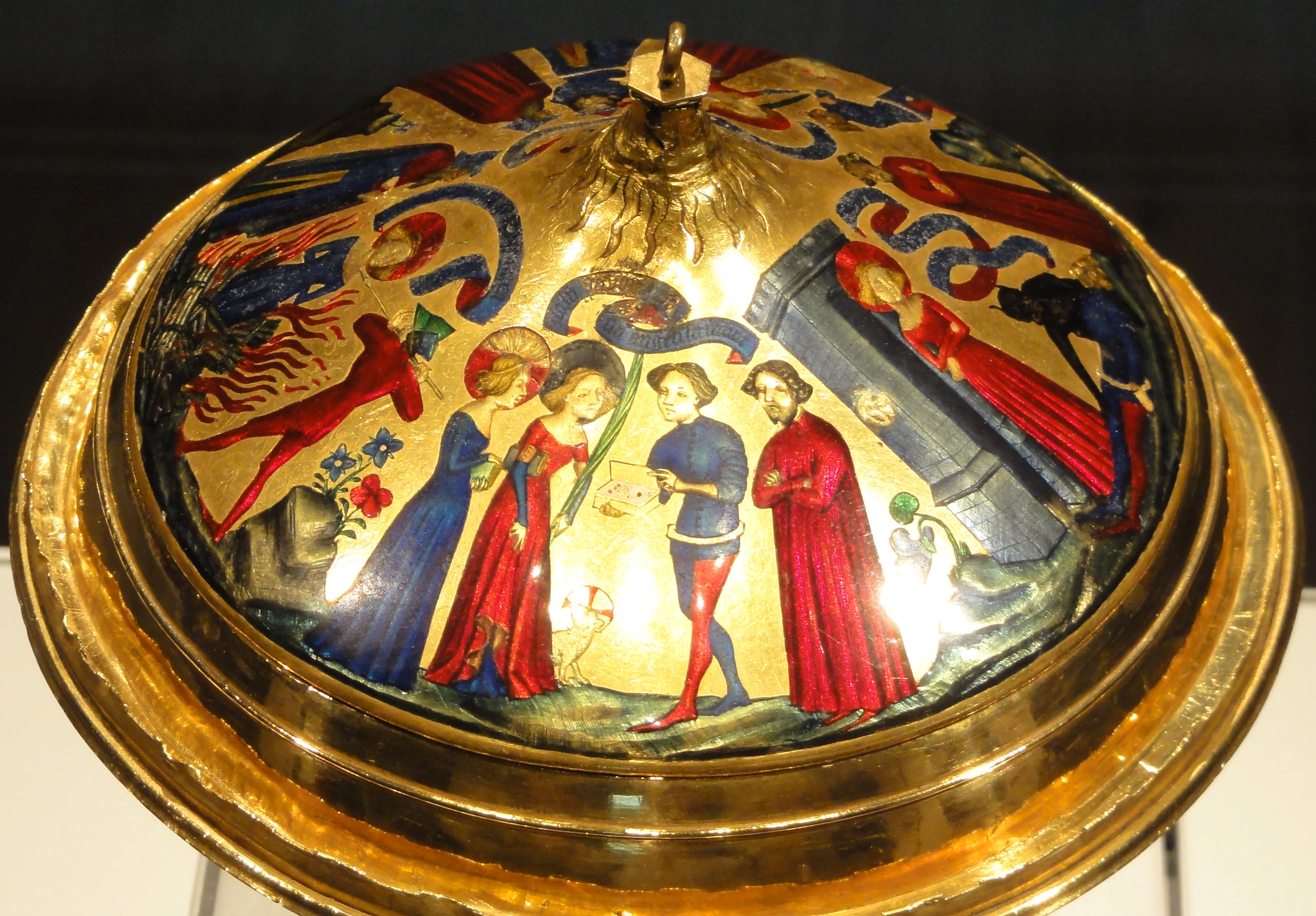
The first scene on the cover; Procopius offers Agnes a casket of jewels. Parts of the next scene can be seen at right, and her martyrdom at left.

The cycle of scenes from the life of Saint Agnes, and that of her foster-sister Saint Emerentiana, follows the traditional story of Golden Legend of Jacobus de Voragine; the most popular compilation of hagiographies of the age, whose wording corresponds to some of the inscriptions in banderoles or scrolls that explain the scenes. Other texts are quotations from the Latin Vulgate Bible, mostly derived from the liturgy for St Agnes' feast day, and it has been suggested that the two rings of pearls also reflect the language of the chants for these services. It seems likely that clerical advice was taken, at least over the texts used in the inscriptions. It is tempting to relate the depiction of the story, with its "distinct and vivid tableaux, well suited to adaptation for performance" to medieval drama, often a source for iconography, but the fragmentary records mention no dramas on the life of St Agnes that are close in time or place to the origin of the cup.

Agnes and her sister were virgins of Rome in the time of the Emperor Constantine, though all figures are shown in contemporary 14th-century dress. The story begins on the inside of the bowl, which has a round medallion showing St Agnes kneeling before a bearded figure, representing her teacher, wearing a chaperon. She holds a book inscribed Miserere mei Deus sancte ("Have pity on me, Holy God"), while a banderole says In corde meo abscondi eloquia tua ut non peccem tibi ("Thy words have I hid in my heart that I might not sin against thee". Psalms 119:11). The top of the cover continues the story up to Agnes' martyrdom in five scenes, shown with a continuous groundline from which small rocks rise up to demarcate the scenes; on the base trees perform this function. Sunrays radiate from the centre of the cover above all the scenes; the red enamel which once filled these is nearly all lost.

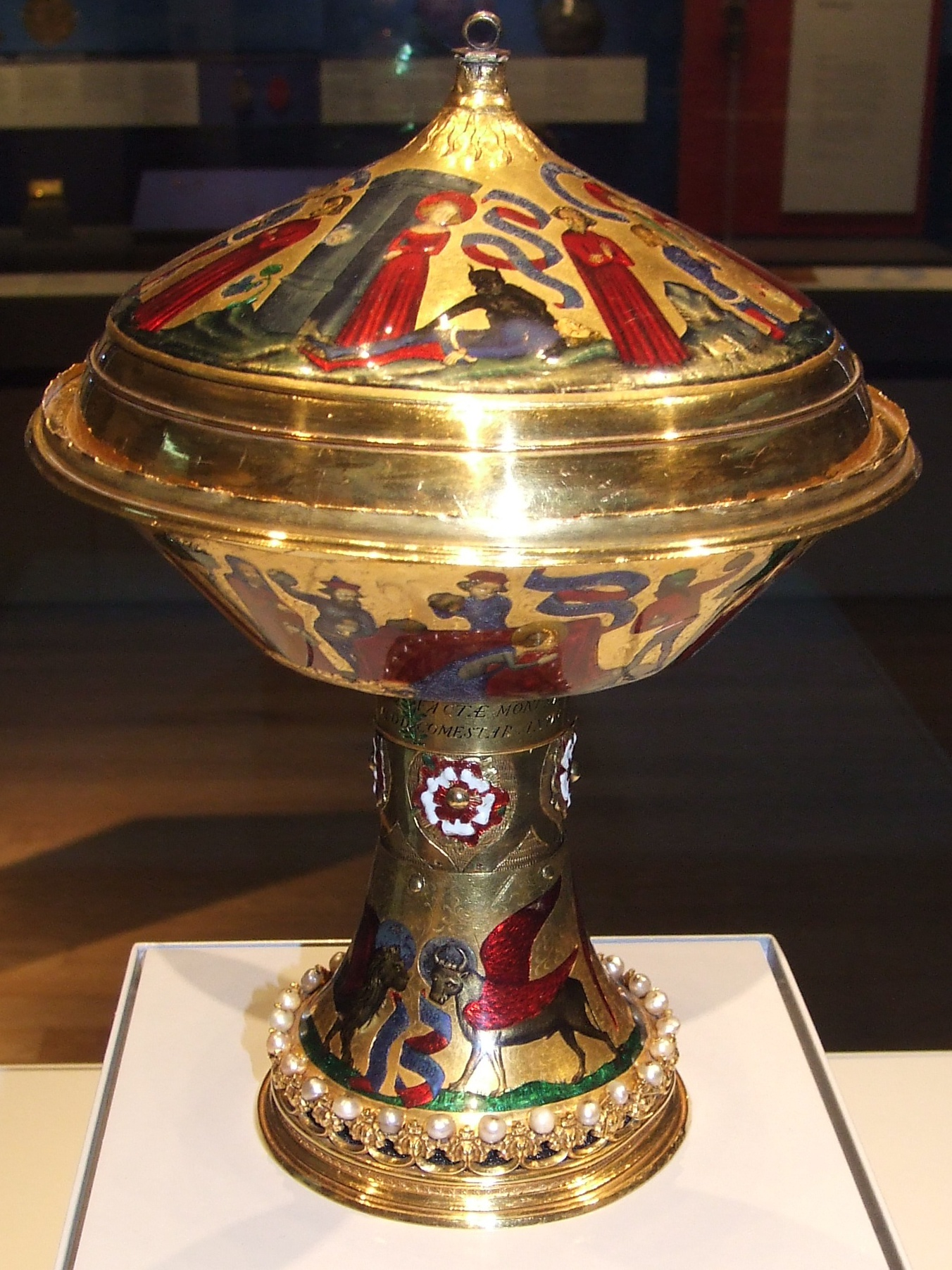
On the cover, the second scene with Agnes outside the brothel and Procopius lying dead. Below, the pagans stone Emerentiana, and on the foot the winged ox, symbol of Saint Luke.

In the first scene the two girls are returning from school, Agnes accompanied by her punning attribute, a lamb with a cruciform halo, and carrying a martyr's palm. They are accosted by Procopius, the young son of the Prefect of Rome, who has fallen in love with Agnes and shows her an open casket of jewels to persuade her to marry him. The inside of the casket is white, the only colour of opaque enamel in the original work, used only for a few highlights like the tiny area of the host held by Christ on the inside of the cover. Agnes rejects him, with the words Illi sum desponsata cui angeli serviunt ("I am betrothed to him who the angels serve") in a banderole above. In the Caxton her rejection is unequivocal and not polite, and she points out that her heavenly fiancé has promised her much better jewels. The Prefect stands behind his son, and in the next scene has sentenced her to serve in a brothel for being a Christian who refuses to sacrifice to the goddess Vesta. Caxton's Legend fills in the intervening action:

Then made she of the bordel her oratory, ... All they that entered made honour and reverence to the great clearness that they saw about St. Agnes, and came out more devout and more clean than they entered. At last came the son of the provost with a great company for to accomplish his foul desires and lusts. And when he saw his fellows come out and issue all abashed, he mocked them and called them cowards. And then he, all araged, entered for to accomplish his evil will. And when he came to the clearness, he advanced him for to take the virgin, and anon the devil took him by the throat and strangled him that he fell down dead.

In the next scene on the cup, Agnes stands outside the sentry box-like brothel, looking down at the Prefect's son who has been strangled to death by the devil crouched over him; a banderole reads Quo modo cecidisti qui mane oriebaris ("How has thou fallen that risest in the morning", Isaiah 14:12), and the Prefect looks on sadly.

In the following scene Agnes has been moved by the Prefect's grief, and prayed for the son to be restored to life, which an angel has done. The repentant Procopius kneels before her, while she leans down to tell him Vade amplius noli peccare ("Go forth and sin no more"; from John 8:11). However the result of the miracle was that (in William Caxton's translation) "the bishops of the idols made a great discord among the people, so that all they cried: Take away this sorceress and witch that turned men's minds and alieneth their wits". The Prefect is now sympathetic to Agnes but fears he will lose his position if he does nothing, so leaves the matter in the hands of another official; the two are seen talking together, with words from Luke 23:4 Nihil invenio cause in eam ("I find no cause against her") above. The last scene shows her martyrdom; she was sentenced to be burned but the flames part away from her so that finally the magistrate orders her killed by a spear. Her last words, from Luke 23:46, are In manus tuas domine commendo animam meam ("Into your hands, O Lord, I commend my spirit").

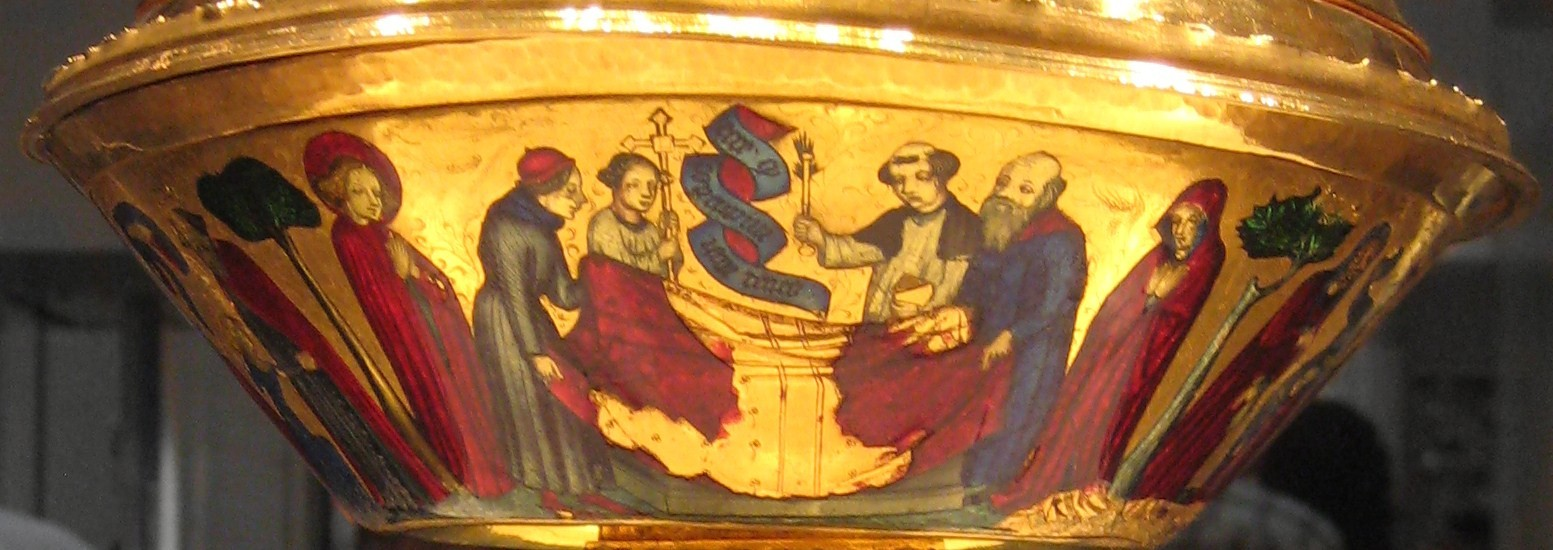
The first scene underneath the bowl, in which Agnes is buried

The scenes continue on the underside of the bowl, starting with Agnes' burial. A pall is being laid over her sarcophagus, whose red enamel has significant losses, which reveal clearly the engraved lines beneath. A tonsured priest with an aspergil for sprinkling holy water and an acolyte with a cross attend, with Emerentiana with halo to the left, and Agnes' mother to the right. The banderole above says Ecce quod concupivi iam teneo ("Behold what I have desired I now possess"). In the next scene pagans have arrived to disrupt the burial, and only Emerentiana has stayed, kneeling in prayer as she is pelted with rocks. The inscription reads Veni soror mea mecum in gloria ("Come with me my sister into glory"). She dies, and the following scene shows the two martyrs, accompanied by two other unnamed female martyrs (in the source "a great multitude of virgins clad in vestments of gold and silver"), as they appear in a vision to Agnes' friends eight days after her death, as they gather round her sarcophagus, into which Emerentiana's body has also been placed.

The next scene shows the sarcophagus with Constantina, the daughter of the Emperor Constantine, asleep on top of it, wearing a crown. She has been afflicted with leprosy, and heard of the vision at Agnes' tomb, and come to pray there. The presence at left of a young man on crutches, not in the source, suggests that others are doing the same. The sleeping woman beside the tomb is either another such, or an attendant on the princess. As Constantina sleeps, Agnes, holding her lamb, appears to her, saying Si in xpm (Christum) credideris sanaberis ("If you believe in Christ you will be healed", an adaptation of the text in the source). In the final scene, the cured, and baptized, Constantina tells her crowned father the story, with the inscription Hec est virgo sapiens una de numero prudencium ("This is a wise virgin, one of the number of the prudent").

The inside of the cover has a circular enamel medallion with worked gold borders, showing a half-length Christ making a blessing gesture and holding a chalice with a host inside. Around him is a sun-like aureole in red. Below the two added cylinders on the stem, the four traditional symbols of the Evangelists run round the sloping foot of the cup, in pairs facing each other, above a green ground area. Lightbown notes this as "another sign of care for naturalistic effect".

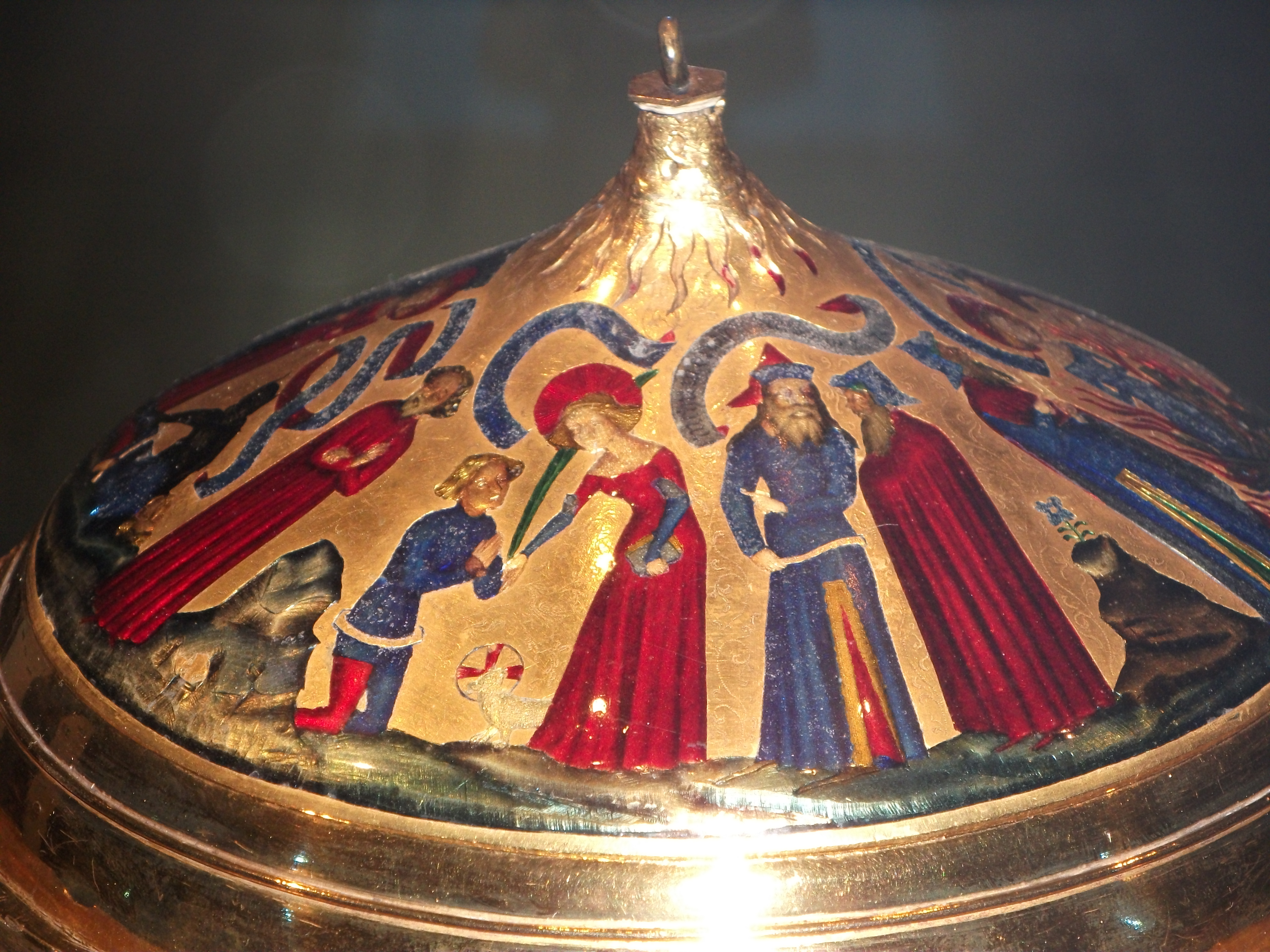
The third and fourth scenes on the cover

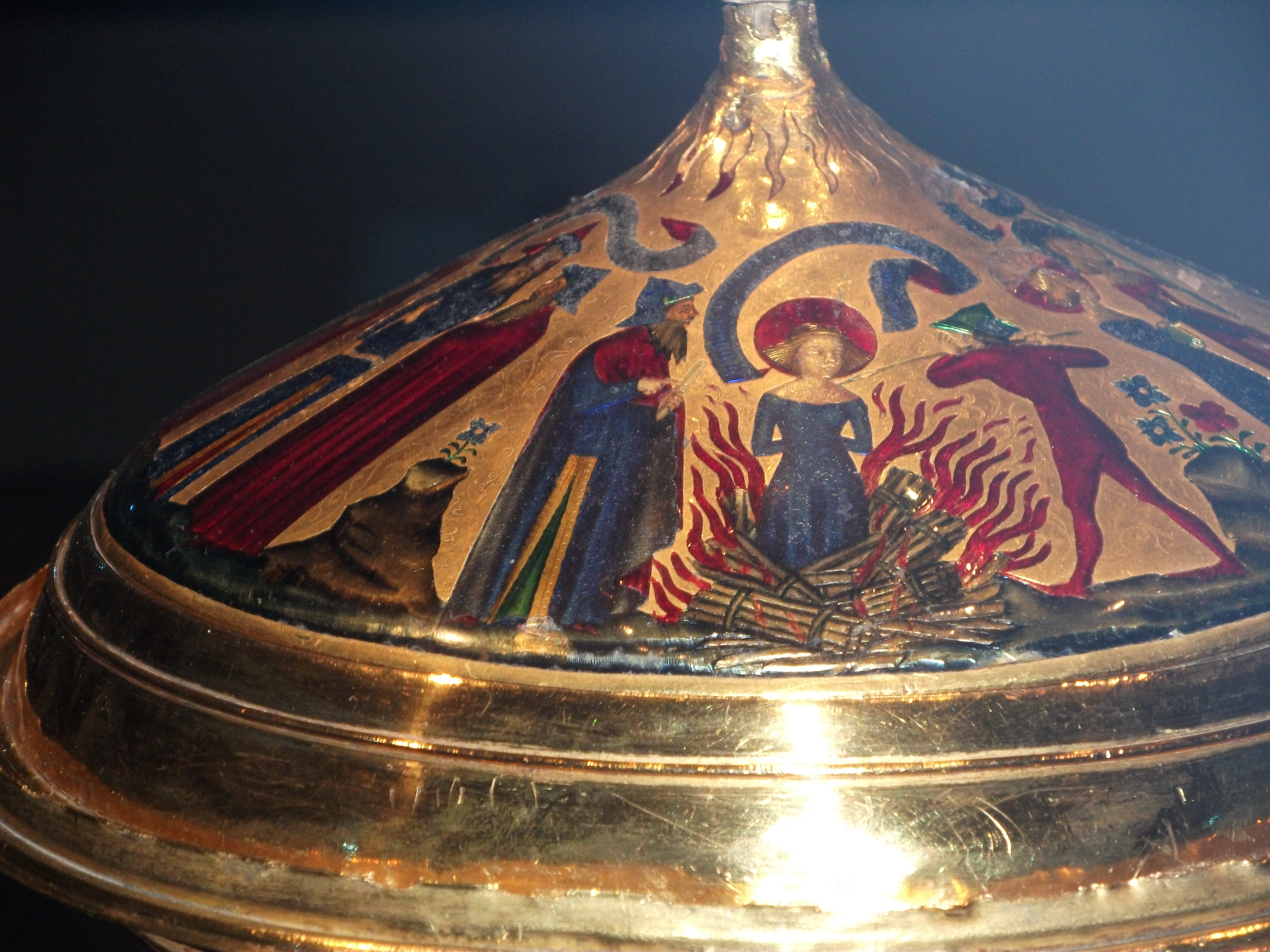
The martyrdom of Agnes

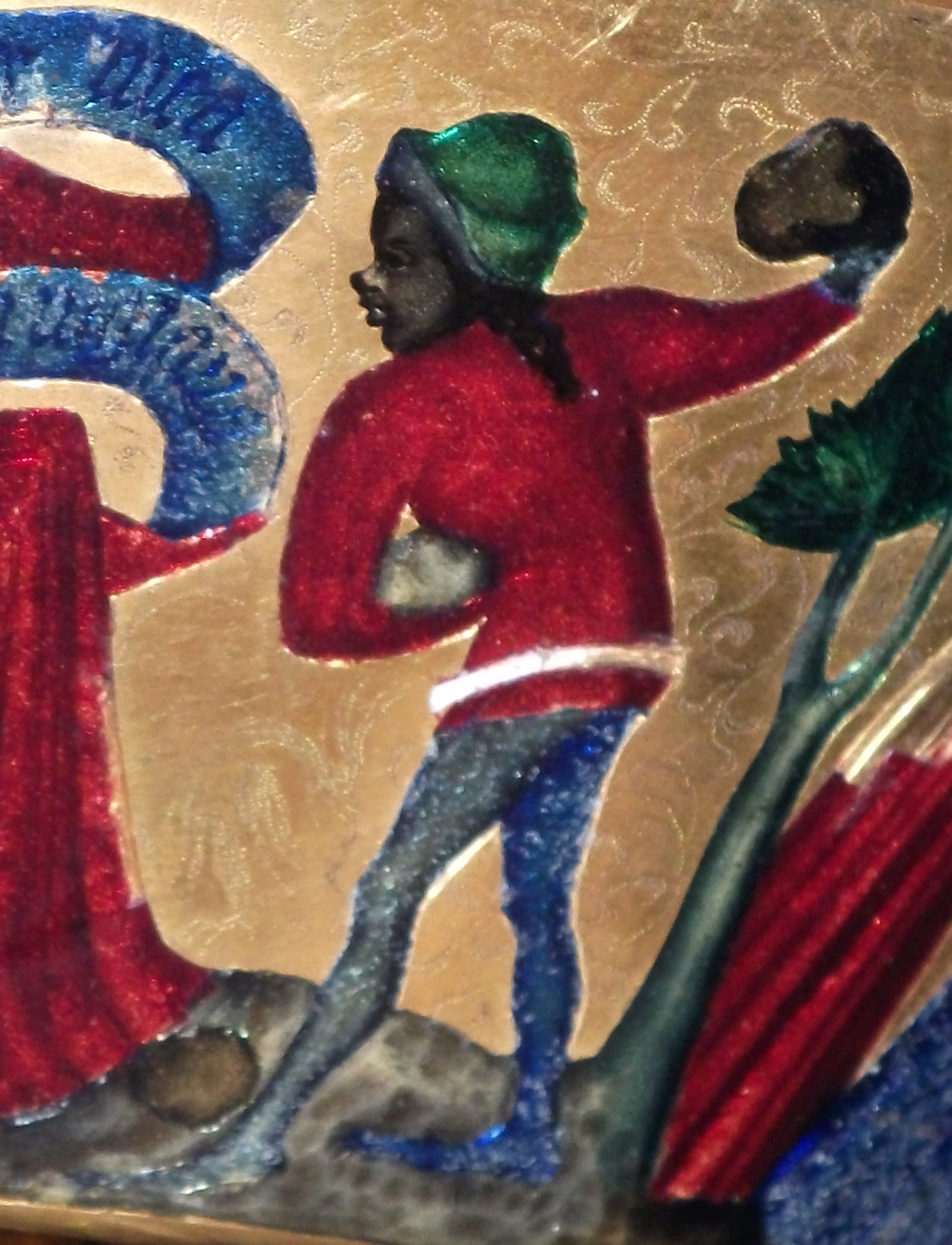
Detail of black pagan stoning Emerentiana

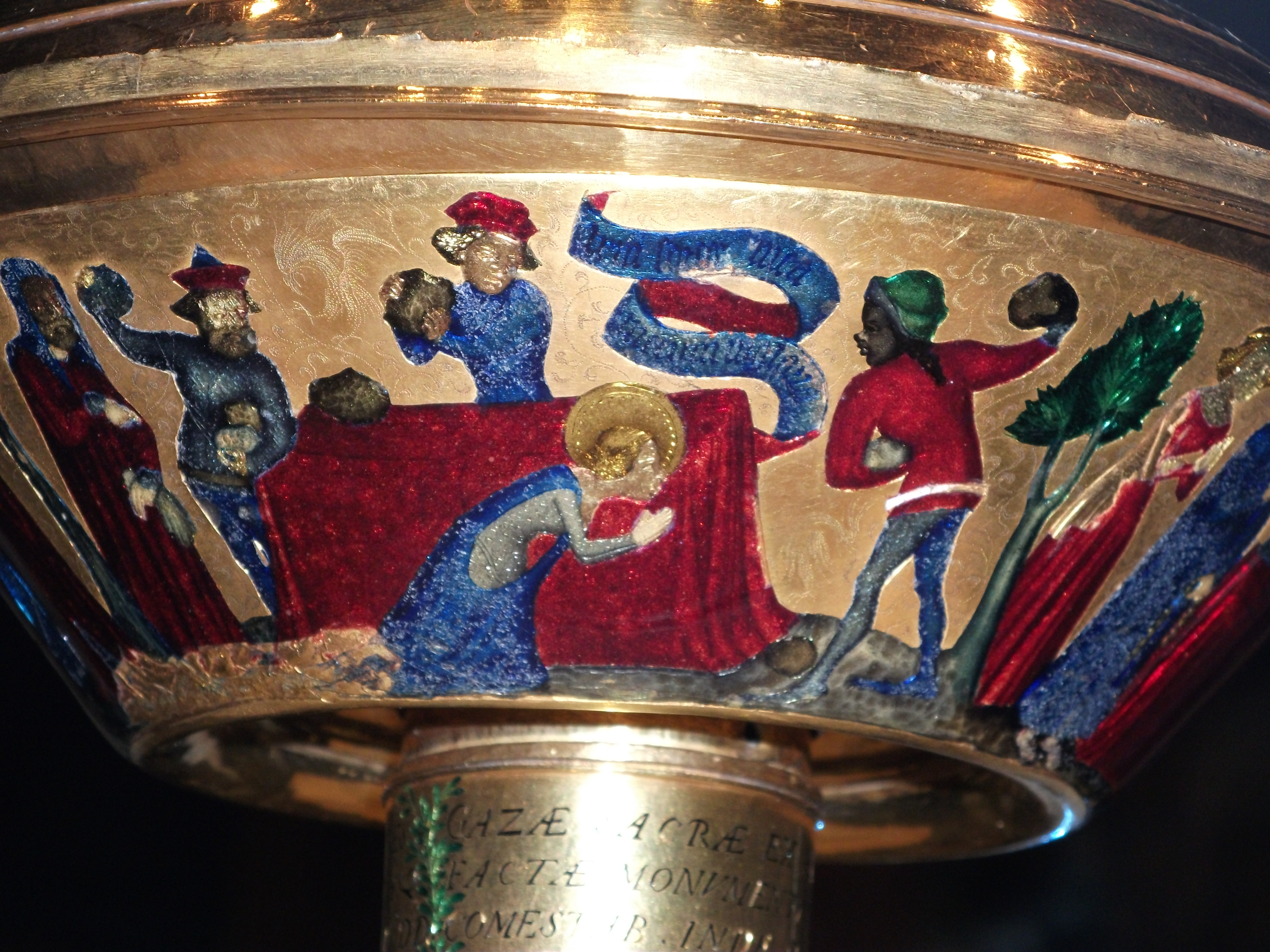
The stoning of Emerentiana

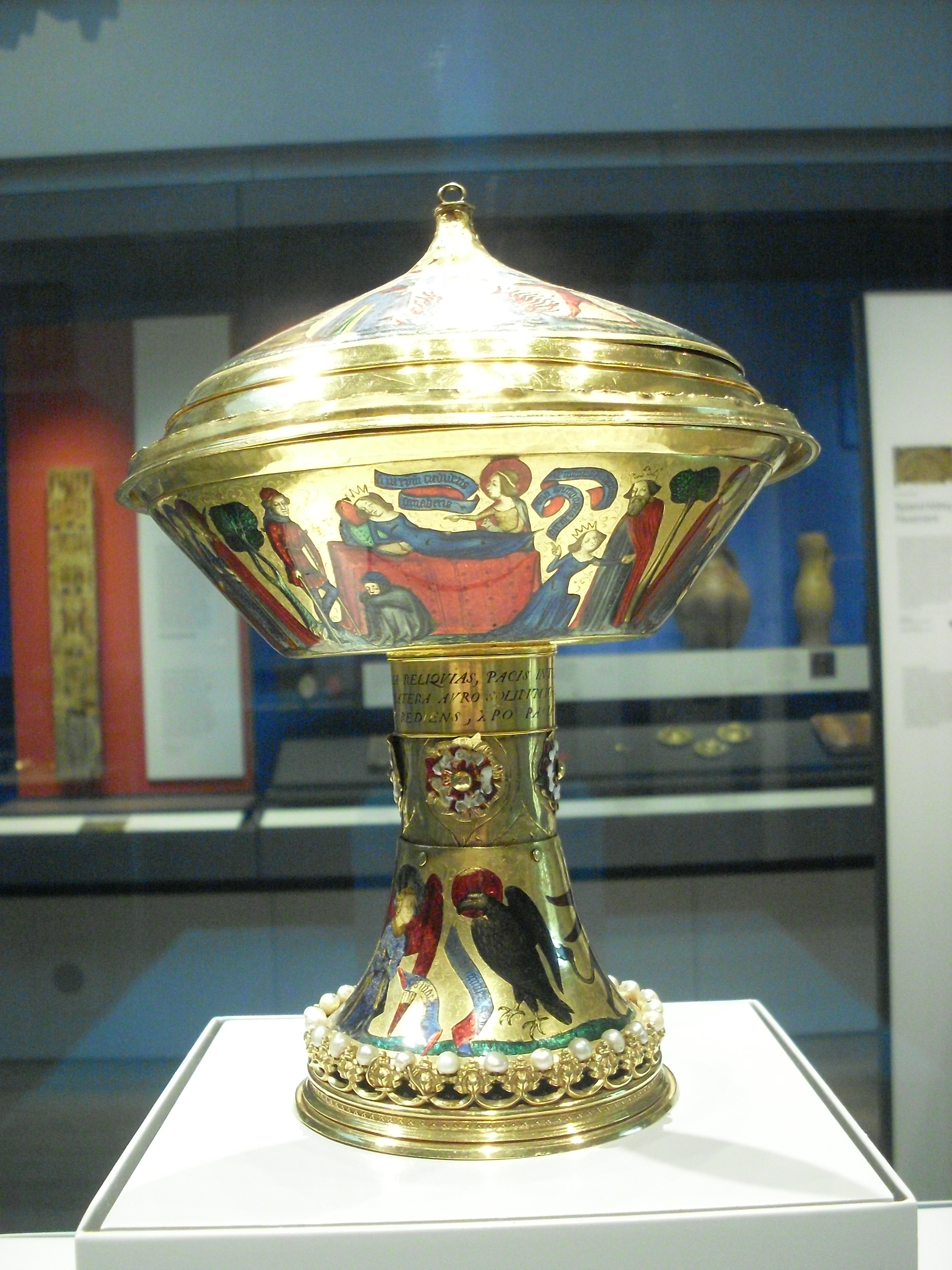
The two final scenes with Constantina

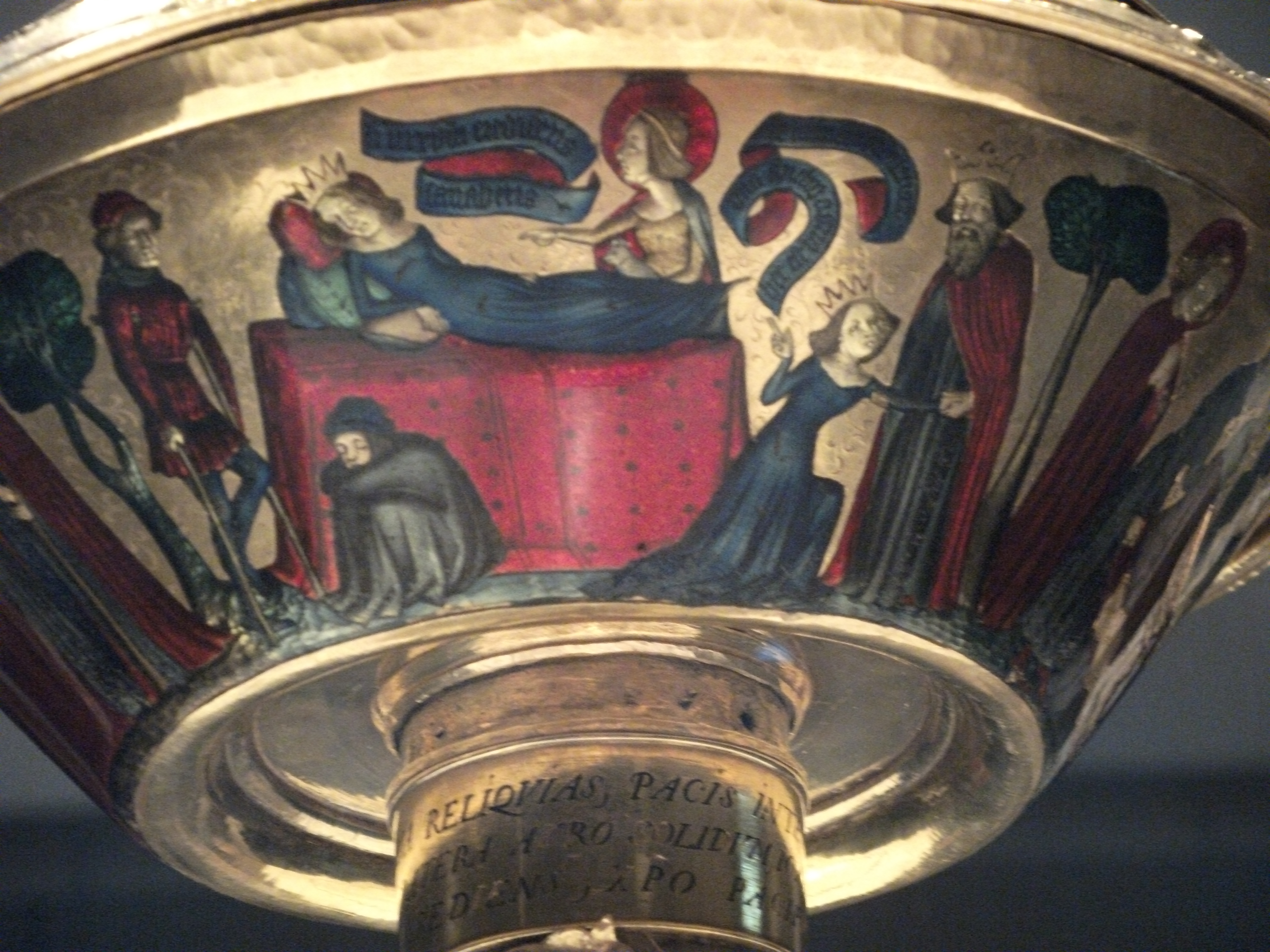
Detail of Constantina's scenes

== Construction and techniques ==
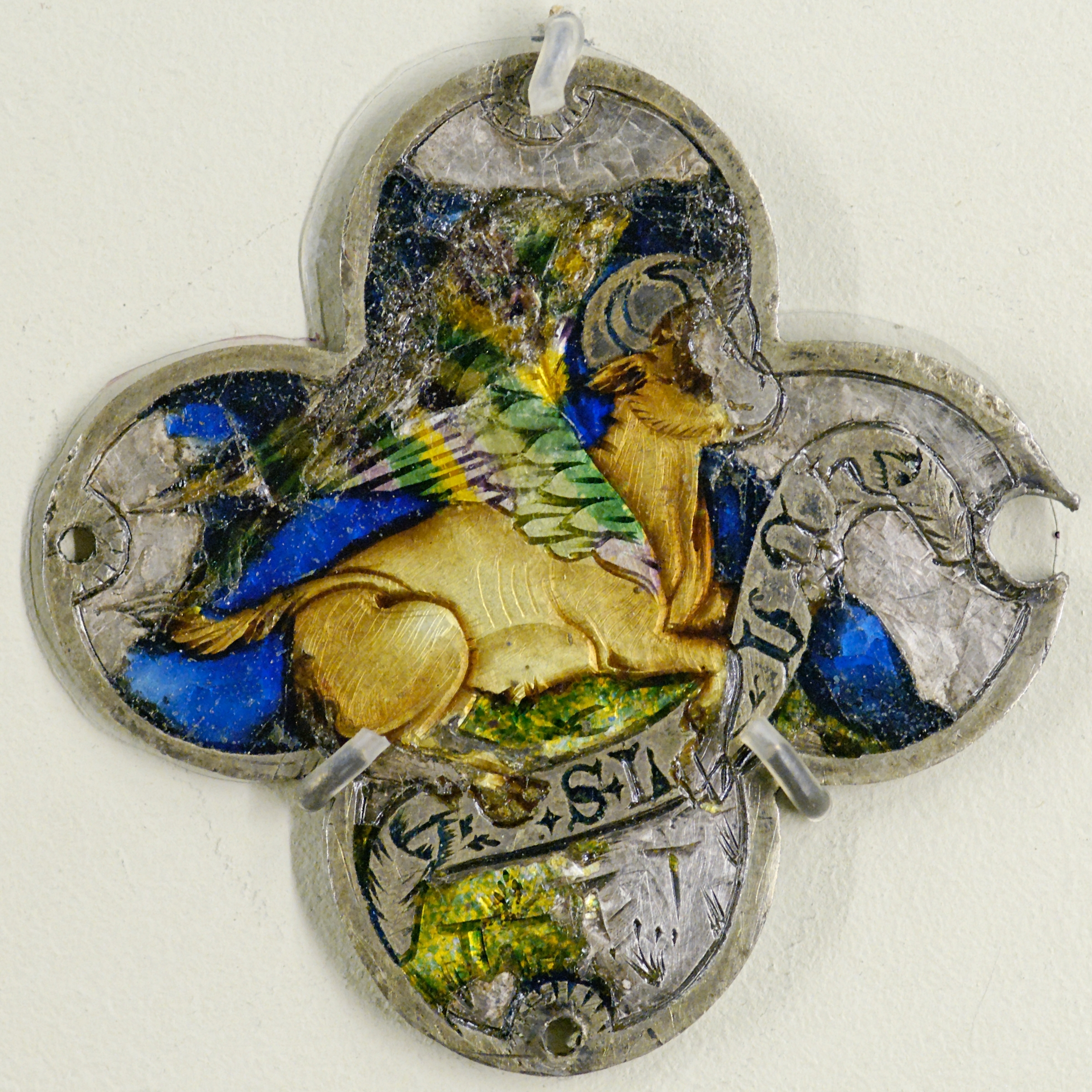
A 14th-century silver plaque in basse-taille with translucent enamels, with considerable losses, showing the prepared metal surfaces beneath, and the tinting with different colours

Each of the cover, main body, and foot of the cup is made of an inner and outer plate, and the enamelled medallions inside the cover and bowl were made separately before attachment. The enamel areas may have been designed by the goldsmith, or an artist more used to painting on panels or in manuscripts may have produced drawings. A number of names of goldsmiths appear in records of the period, but in contrast to many contemporary manuscripts, the few surviving goldsmith's pieces are not signed or marked and cannot be matched to any names. Not a single maker's name is recorded for the more than 3,000 items in precious metal in the inventory mentioned above of the possessions of Berry's brother Anjou. High quality courtly work like the cup is conventionally assigned to Paris in the absence of other stylistic evidence; this is where other documentary sources locate the main concentration of goldsmiths.

The process for creating the basse-taille enamel areas began by marking the outline of the design and the main internal outlines on the gold with a tool called a "tracer". Then the interior area was worked with chasing tools, hammering and punching rather than cutting, to form a shallow recess to hold the enamel. The more important parts of the design were modelled by varying the depth of the surface to produce different intensities of colour when the translucent enamel was added; the gold under folds of drapery often rises near the surface to create a paler highlight. In many of the recessed areas decoration was added by either engraving or punching which would show through the translucent enamel, or to facet the background so the reflections change as the viewing angle changes slightly. In these last-mentioned areas cutting tools were used. Most of the background outside the enamelled areas was decorated in the same way. After the enamel was added and fired the surfaces were cleaned up, made good and polished, including removing by scraping any bumps showing through on the reverse of the metal.

The enamel lies flush with the gold surfaces; it was a preparation of finely ground glass paste applied with great care to the prepared recessed areas, and then fired. Different colours of enamel meet each other with a neat boundary, which was achieved by firing one colour with a retaining border of gum tragacanth before adding the next. The difficulty was increased by the application of tints of a different colour to a base shade of enamel before firing, so that the added colour blends gradually into the background colour around the edges of the tinted area. This is especially used on "flux", or colourless enamel, as in the ground areas, rocks and trees. Flux was also used for flesh areas as on a gold background it darkens slightly when fired to a suitable colour for skin. The rouge clair or "ruby glass" red, used so effectively here, was made by adding tiny particles of copper, silver and gold to the glass; here scientific tests have shown that copper was used. After firing the enamel was polished flush with the surrounding metal. The technique had been known to the Ancient Romans (see the Lycurgus Cup, also in the British Museum), but was lost at the end of the Middle Ages until the 17th century. The added cylinders use opaque enamel, except for the red on the Tudor roses, which is translucent rouge clair, of a similar composition to the original reds. Translucent enamel is more fragile than opaque, and medieval survivals in good condition are very rare.
