= Hanap =

Large drinking-goblet

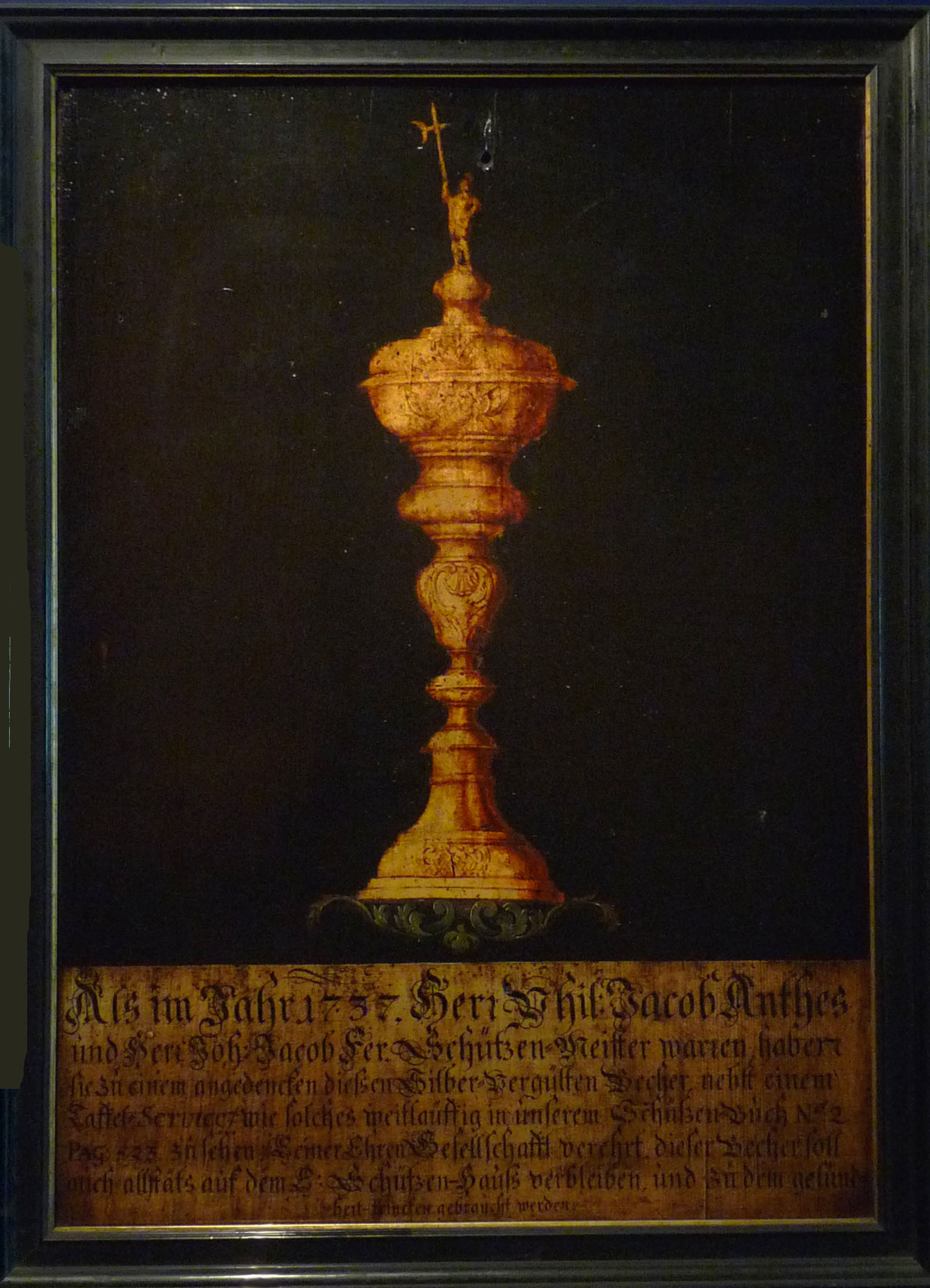
Silver-gilt Hanap (Strasbourg, 18th century)

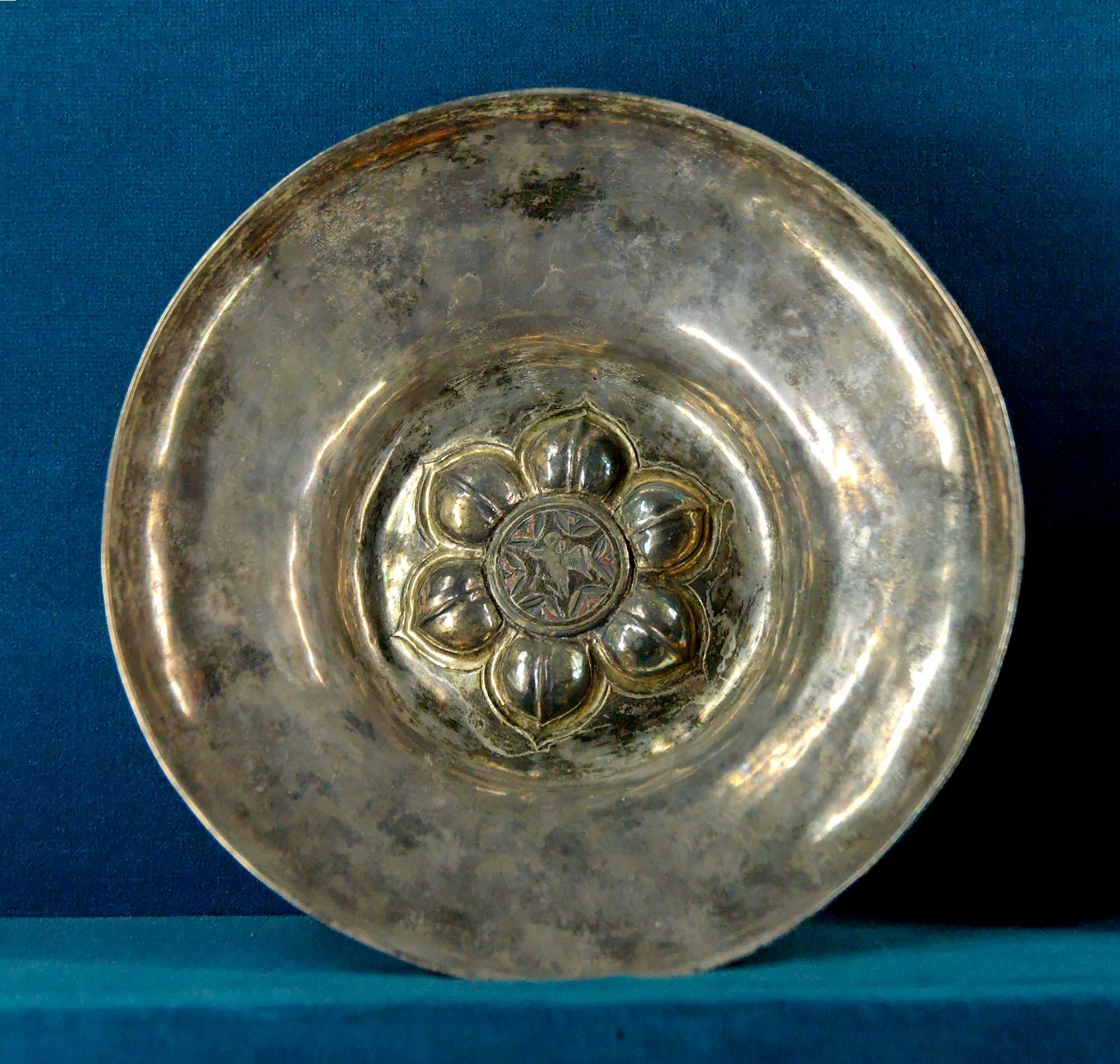
Hanap with a pelican vulning itself to feed its young. Champlevé, enameled and partly gilt silver, France, first half of the 14th century. Found in Gaillon or Rouen, Normandy, France. Musee du Moyen Age, Cl. 1951

"Hanap" is an obsolete, Norman-French term for a large drinking-goblet, made of precious material such as gold or silver, and used especially on state occasions.

== In literature ==
1. Old London Silver, Its History, Its Makers and Its Marks by Montague Howard (1903): "hanap or Standing Cup (1616) Height, 25 inches At St. John's College, Cambridge A radical departure was made in the form of the standing cup of the second ..."

2. Proceedings and Ordinances of the Privy Council of England by Great Britain Privy Council, edited by Sir Nicholas Harris Nicolas, Great Britain Record Commission, England and Wales Privy Council (1834): "Item un autre hanap dargent par tout ... It j. autre hanap dargent playne ove j. tayle entour le ..."

3. In Notes and Queries, contribution by Martim de Albuquerque (1850): "The hanap frequently occurs in wills and inventories of the thirteenth, fourteenth, and fifteenth centuries. In the will of Lady Clare, 1355*,— "Je devise a ..."

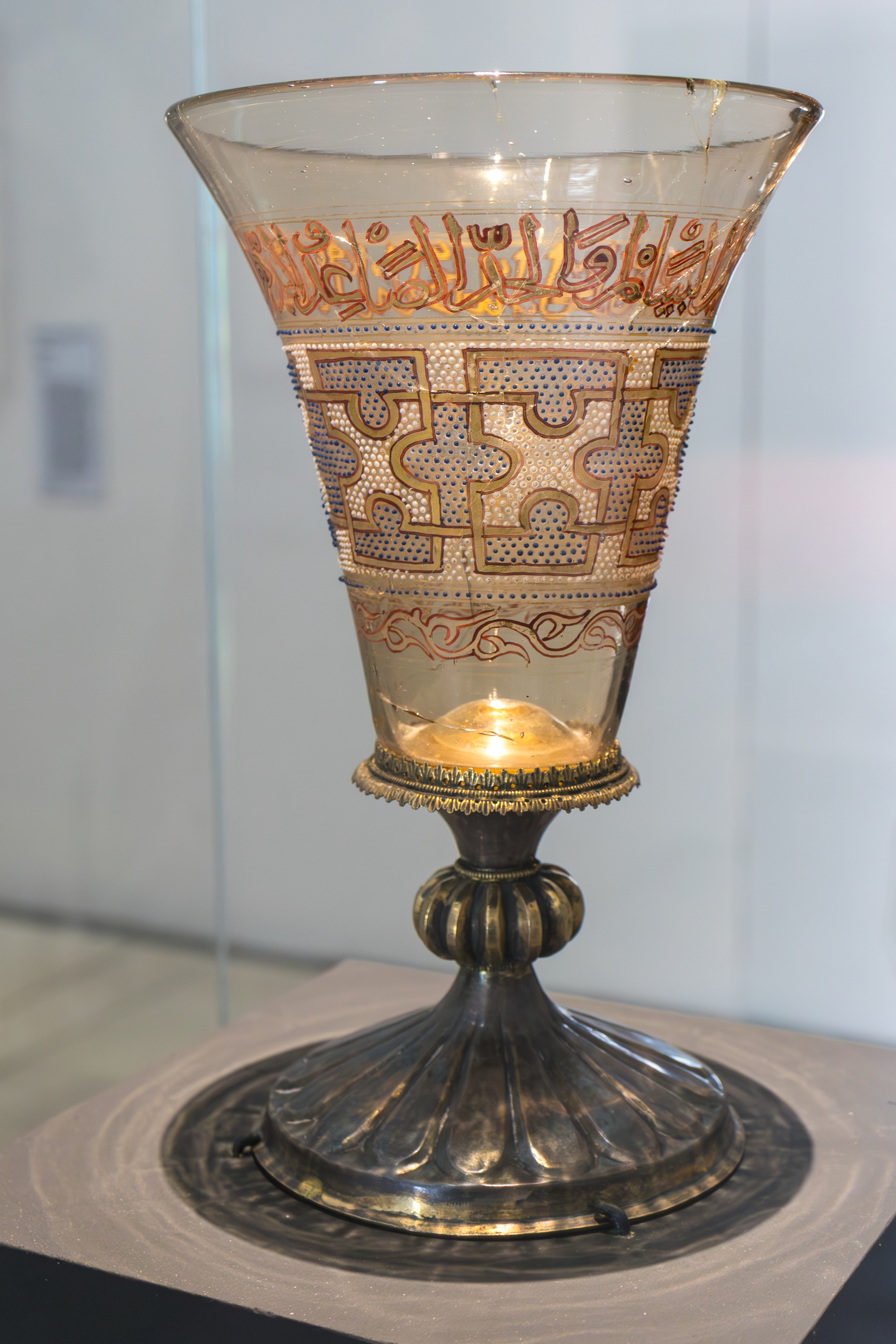
Charlemagne Glass, 12th century, Chartres Museum of Fine Arts

== Resources ==
- http://www.lexic.us/definition-of/hanap

== See also ==
- Hanaper
