= Saint Agnes (disambiguation) =

Saint Agnes or St Agnes may also refer to:

== Saints ==
- Agnes of Rome (291–304) is a virgin martyr, a patron saint of chastity, feasted on 21 January.
- Agnes of Assisi (1197/1198–1253), abbess of the Poor Ladies, feast day 16 November.
- Agnes of Bohemia (1211–1282), also known as Agnes of Prague, feast day 2 March.
- Agnes of Montepulciano (1268–1317), feast day 20 April.

== Places ==
=== Australia ===
- St Agnes, Queensland, a locality in the Bundaberg Region
- St Agnes, South Australia, Australia

=== United Kingdom ===
- St Agnes, Isles of Scilly, England
- St Agnes, Cornwall, England
- St Agnes, Avon, a place in Avon, England

== Schools ==
- St. Agnes Academy (Legazpi City), Philippines

=== United States ===
- St. Agnes School (Jefferson, Louisiana)
- Saint Agnes High School (Saint Paul, Minnesota)
- St. Agnes School, Albany, New York, a school founded in 1870 and merged into the Doane Stuart School, Rensselaer, New York
- St. Agnes School (Lake Placid, New York), a school in Lake Placid, New York
- St. Agnes Academy-St. Dominic School, Memphis, Tennessee
- Saint Agnes Academy (Texas), Houston, Texas

== Other ==
- Saint Agnes (Massimo Stanzione), a c. 1635–1640 painting
- "St. Agnes", an 1837 poem by Alfred Tennyson, retitled "St. Agnes' Eve" in 1857
- Saint Agnes (band), an English industrial rock band

== See also ==
- Sainte-Agnès (disambiguation)
- Sant'Agnese (disambiguation)
- St. Agnes Cathedral (disambiguation)
- St. Agnes Church (disambiguation)
- St. Agnes Hospital (disambiguation)
