= St. Agnes Church =

St. Agnes Church may refer to:

== Australia ==
- St Agnes Anglican Church, Esk, Queensland

== Canada ==
- St. Agnes Church, Thunder Bay, Ontario

== Germany ==
- St. Agnes, Cologne

== Italy ==
- Sant'Agnese fuori le mura, Rome
- Sant'Agnese in Agone, Rome

== Japan ==
- St. Agnes Cathedral (Kyoto)

== United Kingdom ==
- St Agnes' Church, Cotteridge, Birmingham
- St Agnes' Church, Moseley, Birmingham
- St Agnes' Church, Freshwater, Isle of Wight, England
- Church of St Agnes and St Pancras, Toxteth Park, Liverpool, England
- St Anne and St Agnes, City of London, England
- St Agnes' Church, Burmantofts, Leeds, England
- St Agnes' Church, St Agnes, Isles of Scilly

== United States ==
(by state) Several in the U.S. are listed on the National Register of Historic Places (NRHP)

- St. Agnes Catholic Church (Mena, Arkansas), NRHP-listed
- St. Agnes Church (Greenwich, Connecticut)
- Julia A. Purnell Museum, formerly St. Agnes Catholic Church, Snow Hill, Maryland
- St. Agnes Catholic Church (Detroit, Michigan)
- Church of St. Agnes (Saint Paul, Minnesota), NRHP-listed
- St. Agnes Church (New York City)
- Saint Agnes Episcopal Church, Franklin, North Carolina
- St. Agnes Catholic Church (Vermillion, South Dakota), NRHP-listed
- St. Agnes Church (Utica, South Dakota), NRHP-listed
- Church of the Ascension and St Agnes (Washington D.C.)
- St. Agnes Church (Green Bay, Wisconsin)

== See also ==
- Saint Agnes (disambiguation)
- St. Agnes Cathedral (disambiguation)
