= Sainte-Agnès =

Sainte-Agnès is the name of several places:

Communes in France

- Sainte-Agnès, Alpes-Maritimes
- Sainte-Agnès, Isère
- Sainte-Agnès, Jura

In Quebec, Canada

- Sainte-Agnès, Quebec, former parish municipality now part of La Malbaie
- Sainte-Agnès-de-Dundee, Quebec, community in the Municipality of Dundee

== See also ==
- Saint Agnes (disambiguation)
