= Vincelles =

Vincelles may refer to:

- Vincelles, Jura, a commune in the French region of Franche-Comté
- Vincelles, Marne, a commune in the French region of Champagne-Ardenne
- Vincelles, Saône-et-Loire, a commune in the French region of Bourgogne
- Vincelles, Yonne, a commune in the French region of Bourgogne
