= Spinefarm Records =

Spinefarm
- Parent company: Universal Music Group
- Founded: 1990
- Founder: Riku Pääkkönen
- Distributor: PIAS Recordings
- Genre: Heavy metal; extreme metal; hardcore punk
- Country of origin: Finland
- Official website: spinefarmrecords.com

Spinefarm Records is an international record label, which has for example been in business with children of bodom, airbourne, Exc. Spinefarm Founded in Finland in 1990, Spinefarm was acquired by Universal Music Group in 2002.

== History ==
Spinefarm Records began as a mailorder distribution company, founded by Riku Pääkkönen. The company evolved into a record label for Finnish acts such as Nightwish, Children of Bodom, and Sonata Arctica. Since 2002, Spinefarm has been part of Universal Music Group, but operates as an independent business unit.

Pääkkönen sold the original Ranka publishing catalog to Warner/Chappell Music in 2008, including several songs by Spinefarm acts like Children Of Bodom, Finntroll, and Nightwish.

Former Roadrunner Records President Jonas Nachsin was appointed Spinefarm's General Manager - Worldwide in 2013. Spinefarm/UMG acquired the English label Candlelight Records in late 2015. In 2017, Spinefarm Music Group announced the launch of the country, blues, and southern rock-oriented Snakefarm Records.

== Bands ==
As of 2025, Spinefarm Music Group includes the Spinefarm, Candlelight, and Snakefarm labels.

=== Spinefarm ===
- 36 Crazyfists
- Airbourne
- Atreyu
- Bambie Thug
- Billy Talent
- Black Map
- Black Spiders
- Black Veil Brides
- Brkn Love
- The Browning
- Bullet for My Valentine
- Crown Lands
- Creeper
- Cold Steel
- Dayseeker
- D3dset
- Deadlands
- Dead Poet Society
- Death from Above 1979
- Electric Wizard
- Employed to Serve
- Gore.
- Haunt the Woods
- He Is Legend
- High Parasite
- Hunter Oliveri
- Hurtwave
- Kid Kapichi
- Killing Joke
- Lowlives
- Paradise Slaves
- Raging Speedhorn
- Refused
- Royal Thunder
- Saint Agnes
- Saint Asonia
- Saul
- Scorpions
- Shining (Nor)
- Shining (Swe)
- Showing Teeth
- Stone Broken
- VRSTY
- VV (Ville Valo)
- While She Sleeps
- Unprocessed

=== Candlelight ===
- Absu
- Black Moth
- Diablo Swing Orchestra
- Emperor
- Ihsahn
- Khors
- Limbonic Art
- Orange Goblin
- PSOTY
- Shade Empire
- Vision of Disorder
- Voices
- Winterfylleth
- Zyklon

=== Snakefarm ===
- Austin Meade
- Brothers Osborne
- Chris Shiflett
- Eric Church
- Jon Pardi
- Kezia Gill
- Kip Moore
- Marcus King
- Marty Stuart
- The Temperance Movement (US & Canada)
- Whiskey Myers

== See also ==
- List of record labels
