= Vercia =

- Part of Val-Sonnette
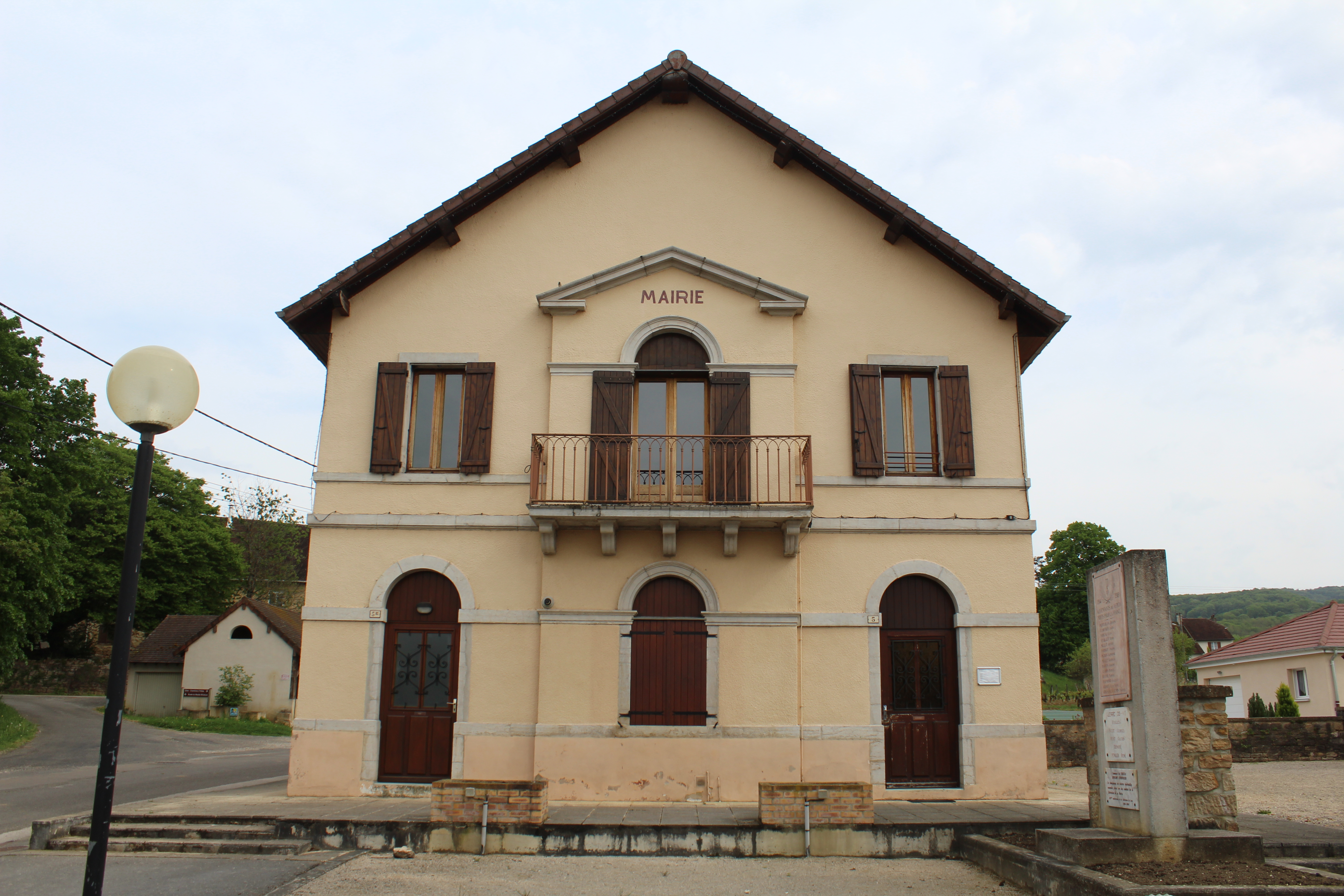
- Town hall
- Location of Vercia
- Location within France Location within Bourgogne-Franche-Comté
- Coordinates: 46°35′29″N 5°27′27″E
- Country: France
- Region: Bourgogne-Franche-Comté
- Department: Jura
- Arrondissement: Lons-le-Saunier
- Canton: Saint-Amour
- Commune: Val-Sonnette
- Area^{1}: 4.06 km^{2} (1.57 sq mi)
- Highest elevation: 296 m (971 ft)
- Lowest elevation: 198 m (650 ft)
- Population (2023): 304
  - Density: 74.9/km^{2} (194/sq mi)
- Time zone: UTC+01:00 (CET)
  - Summer (DST): UTC+02:00 (CEST)
- Postal code: 39190
- ^{1} French Land Register data, which excludes lakes, ponds, glaciers > 1 km^{2} (0.386 sq mi or 247 acres) and river estuaries.

Vercia (French pronunciation: [vɛʁsja]) is a former commune in the Jura department in the Bourgogne-Franche-Comté region in eastern France. On 1 January 2017, it was merged into the new commune Val-Sonnette.

== See also ==
- Communes of the Jura department
