= Grusse =

- Part of Val-Sonnette
- Location of Grusse
- Location within France Location within Bourgogne-Franche-Comté
- Coordinates: 46°35′58″N 5°30′07″E
- Country: France
- Region: Bourgogne-Franche-Comté
- Department: Jura
- Arrondissement: Lons-le-Saunier
- Canton: Saint-Amour
- Commune: Val-Sonnette
- Area^{1}: 3.25 km^{2} (1.25 sq mi)
- Highest elevation: 550 m (1,800 ft)
- Lowest elevation: 228 m (748 ft)
- Population (2023): 182
  - Density: 56.0/km^{2} (145/sq mi)
- Time zone: UTC+01:00 (CET)
  - Summer (DST): UTC+02:00 (CEST)
- Postal code: 39190
- ^{1} French Land Register data, which excludes lakes, ponds, glaciers > 1 km^{2} (0.386 sq mi or 247 acres) and river estuaries.

Grusse (French pronunciation: [ɡʁys]) is a former commune in the Jura department in Bourgogne-Franche-Comté in eastern France. On 1 January 2017, it was merged into the new commune Val-Sonnette.

== See also ==
- Communes of the Jura department
