= Val-Sonnette =

- Commune
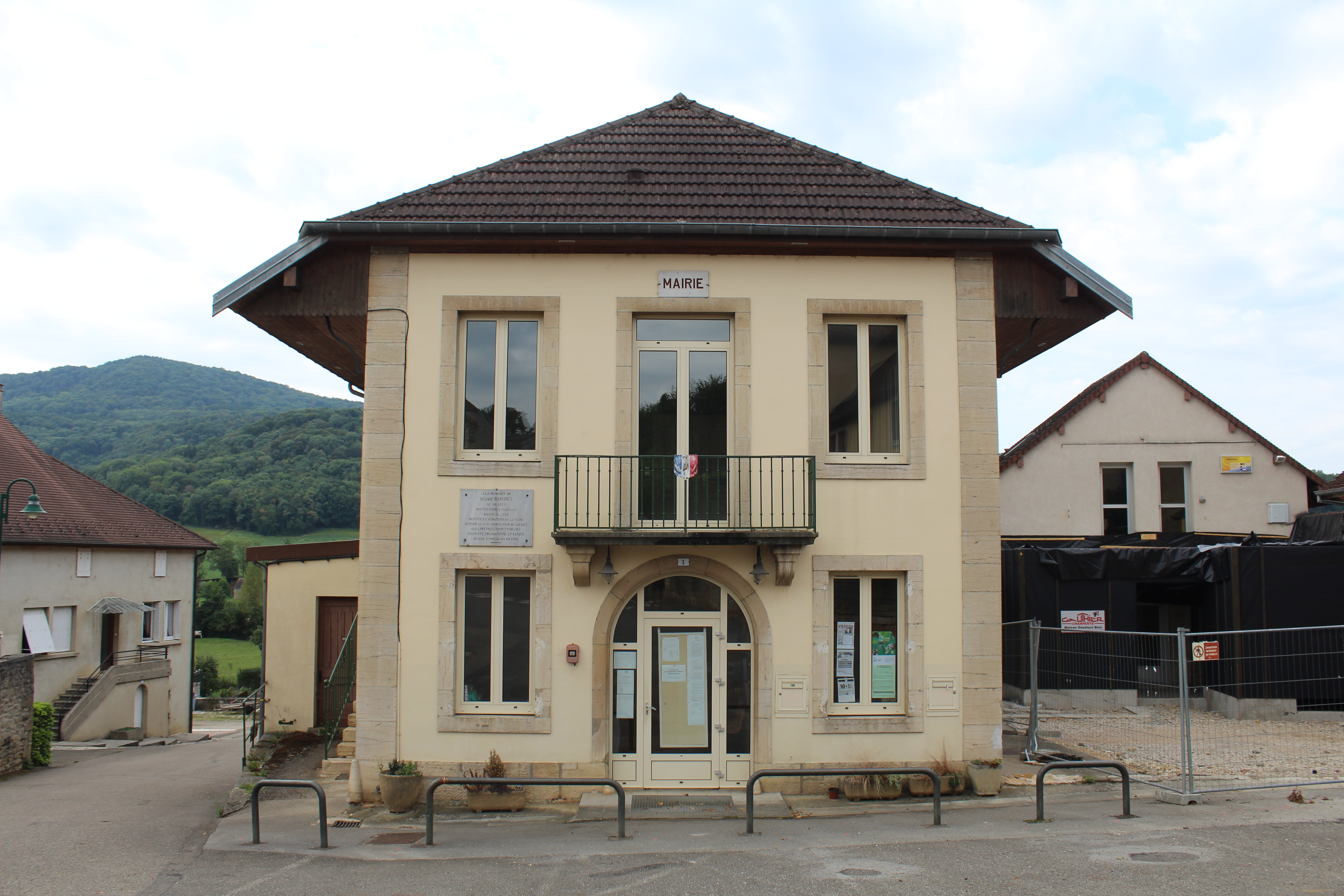
- The town hall in Val-Sonnette
- Location of Val-Sonnette
- Location within France Location within Bourgogne-Franche-Comté
- Coordinates: 46°36′04″N 5°28′48″E
- Country: France
- Region: Bourgogne-Franche-Comté
- Department: Jura
- Arrondissement: Lons-le-Saunier
- Canton: Saint-Amour
- Intercommunality: Porte du Jura

Government
  - Mayor (2025–2026): Brigitte Monnet
- Area^{1}: 19.33 km^{2} (7.46 sq mi)
- Population (2023): 1,318
  - Density: 68.18/km^{2} (176.6/sq mi)
- Time zone: UTC+01:00 (CET)
  - Summer (DST): UTC+02:00 (CEST)
- INSEE/Postal code: 39576 /39190
- ^{1} French Land Register data, which excludes lakes, ponds, glaciers > 1 km^{2} (0.386 sq mi or 247 acres) and river estuaries.

Val-Sonnette (French pronunciation: [val sɔnɛt]) is a commune in the department of Jura, eastern France. The municipality was established on 1 January 2017 by merger of the former communes of Vincelles (the seat), Bonnaud, Grusse and Vercia. On 1 January 2025, the former commune of Sainte-Agnès was merged into Val-Sonnette.

== See also ==
- Communes of the Jura department
