= St. Agnes Cathedral =

St. Agnes Cathedral may refer to:

Japan

- St. Agnes Cathedral (Kyoto)

United States

- St. Agnes Cathedral (Springfield, Missouri)
- St. Agnes Cathedral (Rockville Centre, New York)

== See also ==
- Saint Agnes (disambiguation)
- St. Agnes Church (disambiguation)
