= Sant'Agnese =

Sant'Agnese may refer to:

- Sant'Agnese, Castellina in Chianti, a village in Tuscany, frazione of the comune of Castellina in Chianti, province of Siena
- Sant'Agnese - Annibaliano (Rome Metro), an underground station on Line B of the Rome Metro

== Churches ==
- Sant'Agnese, Lodi, a Gothic-style, Augustinian church in Lodi, Lombardy
- Sant'Agnese, Padua, a 14th-century Roman Catholic in Padua, Veneto
- Sant'Agnese fuori le mura, a titulus church, minor basilica in Rome

== See also ==
- Saint Agnes (disambiguation)
