= Bonnaud =

- Part of Val-Sonnette
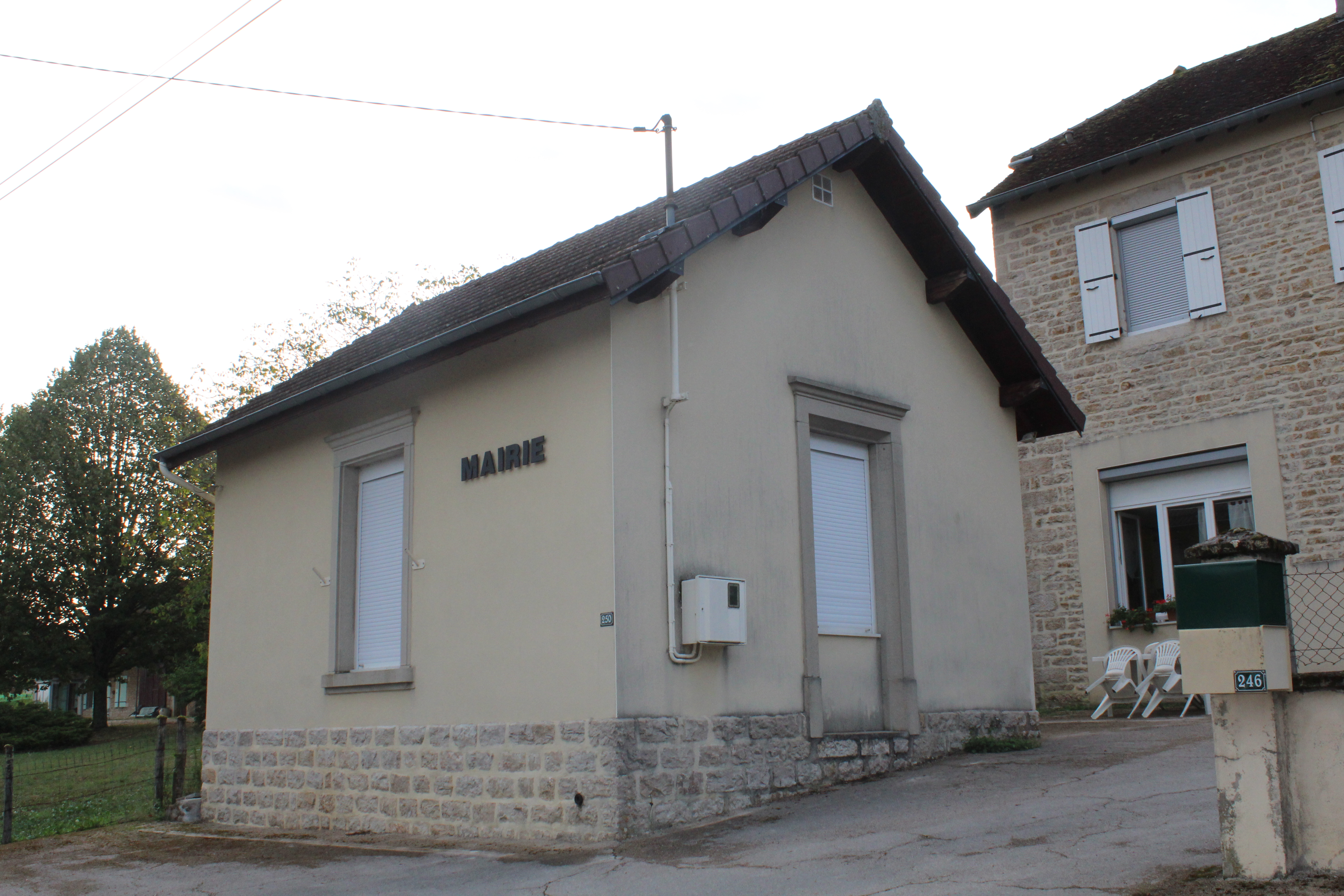
- Town hall
- Location of Bonnaud
- Location within France Location within Bourgogne-Franche-Comté
- Coordinates: 46°37′08″N 5°25′41″E
- Country: France
- Region: Bourgogne-Franche-Comté
- Department: Jura
- Arrondissement: Lons-le-Saunier
- Canton: Saint-Amour
- Commune: Val-Sonnette
- Area^{1}: 1.65 km^{2} (0.64 sq mi)
- Highest elevation: 216 m (709 ft)
- Lowest elevation: 194 m (636 ft)
- Population (2023): 60
  - Density: 36/km^{2} (94/sq mi)
- Time zone: UTC+01:00 (CET)
  - Summer (DST): UTC+02:00 (CEST)
- Postal code: 39190
- ^{1} French Land Register data, which excludes lakes, ponds, glaciers > 1 km^{2} (0.386 sq mi or 247 acres) and river estuaries.

Bonnaud (French pronunciation: [bɔno]) is a former commune in the Jura department in Bourgogne-Franche-Comté in eastern France. On 1 January 2017, it was merged into the new commune Val-Sonnette.

== See also ==
- Communes of the Jura department
