= Vincelles, Jura =

Vincelles
- Part of Val-Sonnette
- Location of Vincelles
- Location within France Location within Bourgogne-Franche-Comté
- Coordinates: 46°36′03″N 5°28′47″E
- Country: France
- Region: Bourgogne-Franche-Comté
- Department: Jura
- Arrondissement: Lons-le-Saunier
- Canton: Saint-Amour
- Commune: Val-Sonnette
- Area^{1}: 6.29 km^{2} (2.43 sq mi)
- Highest elevation: 440 m (1,440 ft)
- Lowest elevation: 194 m (636 ft)
- Population (2022): 401
  - Density: 63.8/km^{2} (165/sq mi)
- Time zone: UTC+01:00 (CET)
  - Summer (DST): UTC+02:00 (CEST)
- Postal code: 39190
- ^{1} French Land Register data, which excludes lakes, ponds, glaciers > 1 km^{2} (0.386 sq mi or 247 acres) and river estuaries.

Vincelles (French pronunciation: [vɛ̃sɛl]) is a former commune in the Jura department in the Bourgogne-Franche-Comté region in eastern France. On 1 January 2017, it was merged into the new commune Val-Sonnette.

== Population ==
Historical population

Year	Pop.	±% p.a.
1793	592	—
1821	570	−0.14%
1846	679	+0.70%
1872	559	−0.75%
1901	562	+0.02%
1926	417	−1.19%
1946	328	−1.19%
1962	308	−0.39%

Year	Pop.	±% p.a.
1968	279	−1.63%
1975	257	−1.17%
1982	271	+0.76%
1990	356	+3.47%
1999	362	+0.19%
2006	349	−0.52%
2022	401	+0.87%

Source: EHESS and INSEE

== See also ==
- Communes of the Jura department
