= Saint Agnes (band) =

English industrial rock band

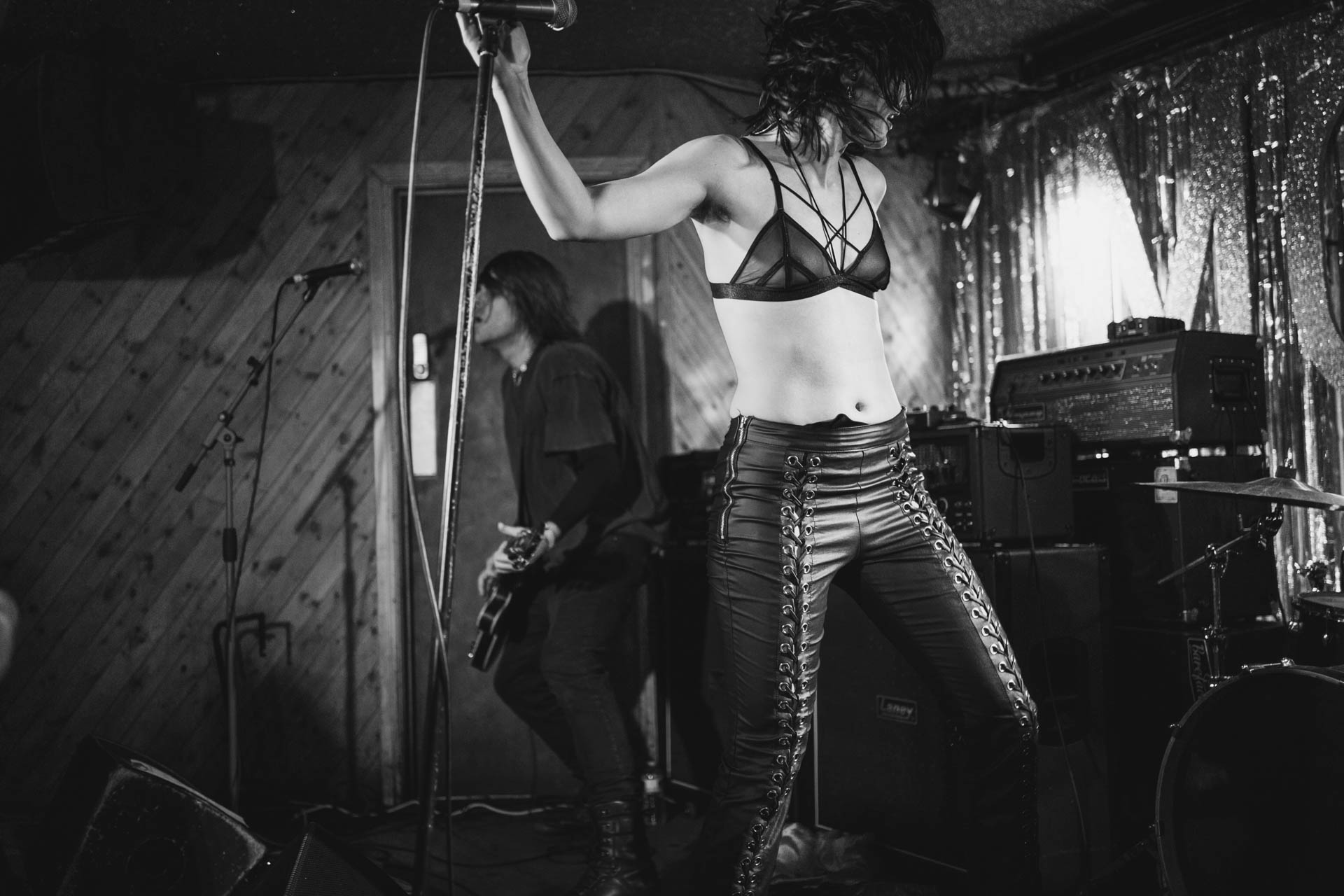
- Saint Agnes performing at the Music for the Many campaign anniversary show at London's MOTH Club on April 15, 2024.

Background information
- Origin: London, England, U.K.
- Genres: Industrial metal; alternative rock; punk blues
- Years active: 2014–present
- Labels: Death Or Glory Gang; Spinefarm
- Members: Kitty A. Austen; Jon James Tufnell; Andy Head
- Website: wearesaintagnes.com

Saint Agnes is an English industrial rock band formed by singer, songwriter, and multi-instrumentalist Kitty A. Austen and guitarist Jon James Tufnell in 2014 in London, England.

== History ==
At a Lola Cult concert in 2014, audience member and guitarist Jon James Tufnell became impressed by the band's singer, Kitty A. Austen, causing him to invite her to collaborate with him on a project. Later that same year, they released their first single, "Old Bone Rattle." Completing the band's lineup with the addition of bassist Ben Chernett and drummer Andy Head, Saint Agnes self-released the EP Live Under London. Three years later, they released their second EP, The Death or Glory Gang. On January 18, 2019, they released their self-produced debut album, Welcome to Silvertown, named after the London borough where all the band members lived.

In 2020, their third EP, The Family Strange, was released, followed a year later by the EP Vampire, the latter containing cover versions of the songs "Wish" and "No Pussy Blues," respectively by Nine Inch Nails and Nick Cave and the Bad Seeds. In the summer of 2021, the band played at the Download Festival. Subsequently, Saint Agnes were signed by Spinefarm Records and released their second studio album, Bloodsuckers, on July 21, 2023, which featured Mimi Barks as a guest vocalist on the song "Body Bag." Saint Agnes then toured Europe as the opening act for Monster Magnet and, a year later, the band played at Hellfest before bassist Ben Chernnet left the band. Their third studio album, Your God Fearing Days Are About to Begin, was released on May 29, 2026.

== Artistry ==
The band started out as a punk blues band, but, by their second album, Bloodsuckers, they changed their style towards industrial rock. The band cites groups and artists such as Nine Inch Nails, PJ Harvey, Nick Cave, and The White Stripes as influences. Emma Wilkes, in the British magazine Kerrang!, described the album Bloodsuckers as a "monster of punk and nu metal" with the "corrosive edge" of The Prodigy, further recommending the album to fans of Wargasm and Ho99o9. The lyrics are written by singer Kitty A. Austen and deal with everyday experiences, which she transforms into larger-than-life fiction.

== Discography ==
=== Albums ===
List of studio albums, showing release details, with selected chart positions
Title	Details	Peak UK chart positions				
Title	Details	Album Sales	Album Downloads	Physical Albums	Record Store	Rock & Metal Albums
Welcome to Silvertown	Released: January 18, 2019; Label: Death or Glory Gang; Formats: CD, LP, digital download	—	—	—	39	—
Bloodsuckers	Released: July 21, 2023; Label: Spinefarm; Formats: CD, LP, digital download	62	—	59	6	9
Your God Fearing Days Are About to Begin	Released: May 29, 2026; Label: Spinefarm; Formats: CD, LP, digital download	71	59	77	21	13
"—" denotes that the album did not chart in that category.

=== Extended plays ===
List of studio and live EPs, showing release details
Title	Details	Notes
Live Under London	Released: March 9, 2015; Label: Energy Snake; Formats: CD	Live in studio, recorded at London's Offtape Studios.
Saint Agnes	Released: c. 2016; Label: Death or Glory Gang; Formats: CD	Collection of the band's first three A-side singles.
The Death or Glory Gang	Released: October 18, 2018; Label: Death or Glory Gang; Formats: LP, digital download	—
The Family Strange	Released: March 27, 2020; Label: Death or Glory Gang; Formats: CD, LP, digital download	—
The Quarantine Diaries	Released: June 15, 2020; Label: Death or Glory Gang; Formats: Digital download	Collection of weekly music cover recordings made during the COVID-19 lockdown.
Vampire	Released: March 26, 2021; Label: Death or Glory Gang; Formats: CD, LP, digital download	Referred to as a mini-album.
Live & Undead	Released: June 11, 2021; Label: Death or Glory Gang; Formats: Digital download	Live in studio, tracks originally recorded for broadcasting on Radio X and the 2000trees livestream.

=== Singles ===
List of singles, showing release details and associated album or EP name
Title	Details	Album/EP
"Old Bone Rattle" b/w "Roadhouse Blues"	Released: c. 2014; Label: Energy Snake; Formats: 7-inch vinyl	Saint Agnes
"Merry Mother Of God Go Round" b/w "We're In This Together Now"	Released: December 8, 2016; Label: Death or Glory Gang; Formats: 7-inch vinyl, CDr	Saint Agnes
"Sister Electric"	Released: c. 2016; Label: Death or Glory Gang; Formats: 7-inch vinyl, promo CDr	Saint Agnes
"The Witching Hour"	Released: May 18, 2018; Label: Death or Glory Gang; Formats: Promo CDr	Welcome to Silvertown
"Brother"	Released: c. 2019; Label: Death or Glory Gang; Formats: Promo CDr	The Family Strange
"This World Ain't Big Enough"	Released: December 4, 2020; Label: Death or Glory Gang; Formats: Digital download	Vampire
"Repent"	Released: January 8, 2021; Label: Death or Glory Gang; Formats: Digital download	Vampire
"Vampire"	Released: February 26, 2021; Label: Death or Glory Gang; Formats: Digital download	Vampire
"Uppercut!"	Released: October 8, 2021; Label: Death or Glory Gang; Formats: Digital download	—
