= St. Agnes Catholic Church (Detroit) =

Church in Detroit, Michigan, United States

St. Agnes Catholic Church Martyrs of Uganda Catholic Church
- St. Agnes Catholic Church; Martyrs of Uganda Catholic Church
- 42°21′59.1″N 83°05′37.7″W
- Location: 7601 Rosa Parks Blvd. Detroit, Michigan
- Country: United States
- Denomination: Roman Catholic

History
- Founded: 1914

Architecture
- Architect(s): Van Leyen, Schilling, Keough, and Reynolds
- Closed: June 2006

Administration
- Province: Detroit
- Diocese: Detroit
- Parish: St. Agnes Parish; Martyrs of Uganda Parish

St. Agnes Catholic Church is a former Catholic parish located in the LaSalle Park neighborhood of Detroit, Michigan. The church was notable for hosting Mother Teresa in 1979 when she established a Missionaries of Charity convent at the church. In 1990, the St. Agnes parish was closed, reopening as Martyrs of Uganda Parish and closing again in 2006. It was sold to developers in 2009 and approved for rezoning in 2022. A fire severely damaged the property in June 2025.
