= St. Agnes, Cologne =

Historic church in Neustadt-Nord, Cologne, Germany

Coordinates: 50°57′18″N 6°57′26″E

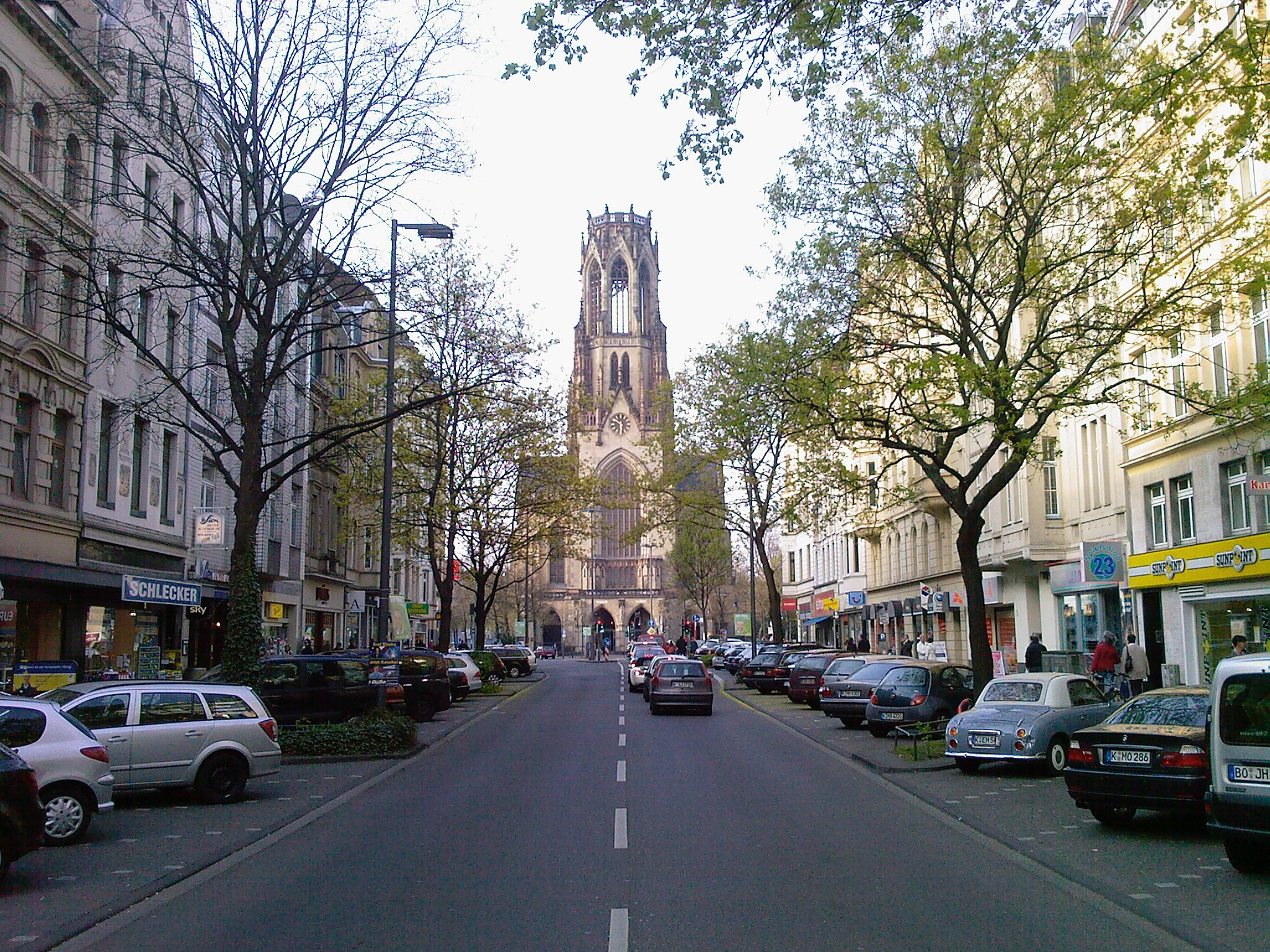
St. Agnes as seen from Neusser Straße

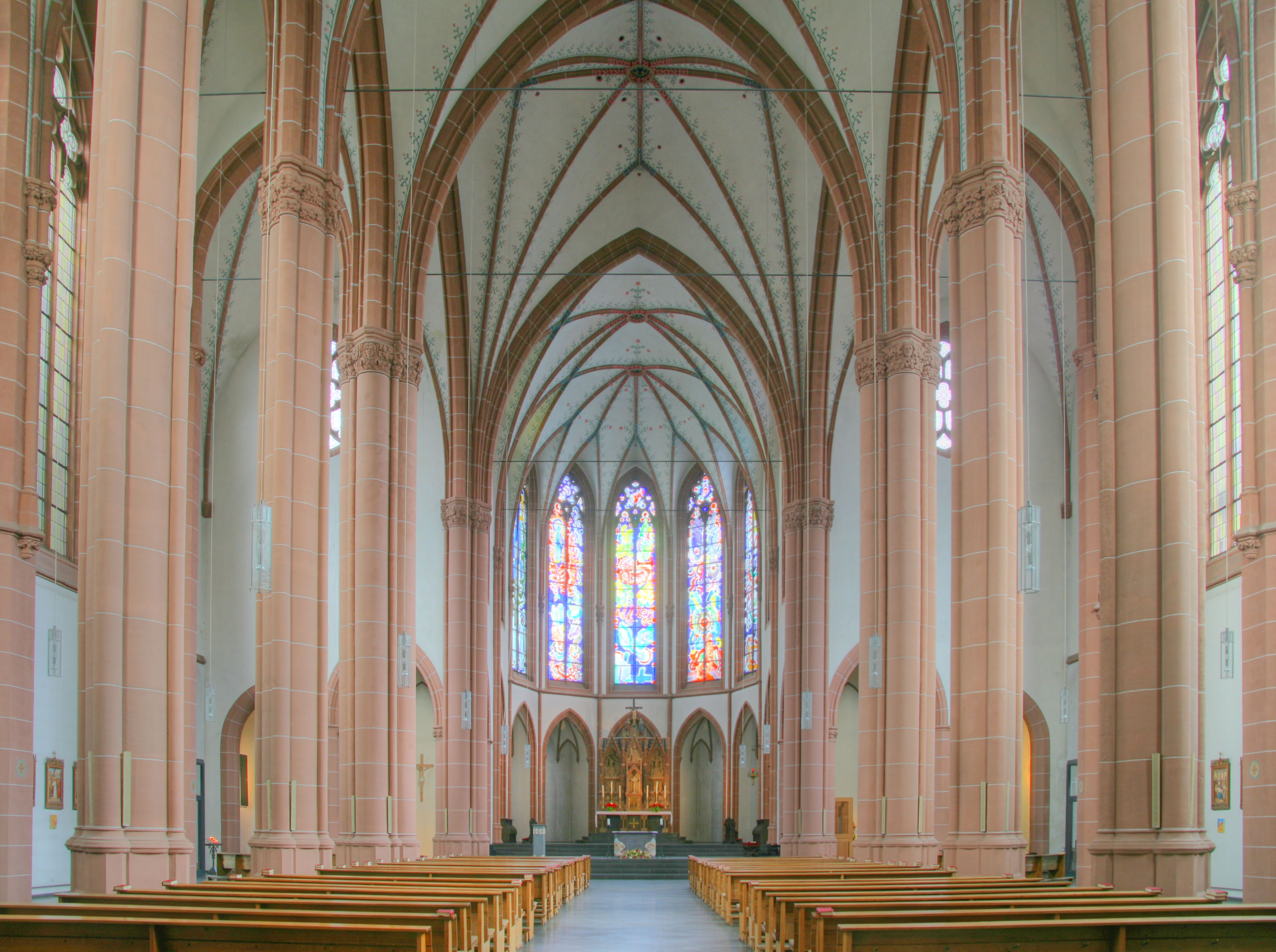
Interior of St. Agnes

St. Agnes is a neo-Gothic Catholic church in Neustadt-Nord, Cologne, Germany. It was consecrated in 1902 and is the second-largest church in Cologne after the Cologne Cathedral. St. Agnes is 80 metres (260 ft) long, 40 metres (130 ft) wide and occupies an area of 2,155 square metres (23,200 sq ft). The tower has a height of 61 metres (200 ft). The church is named after Agnes of Rome.

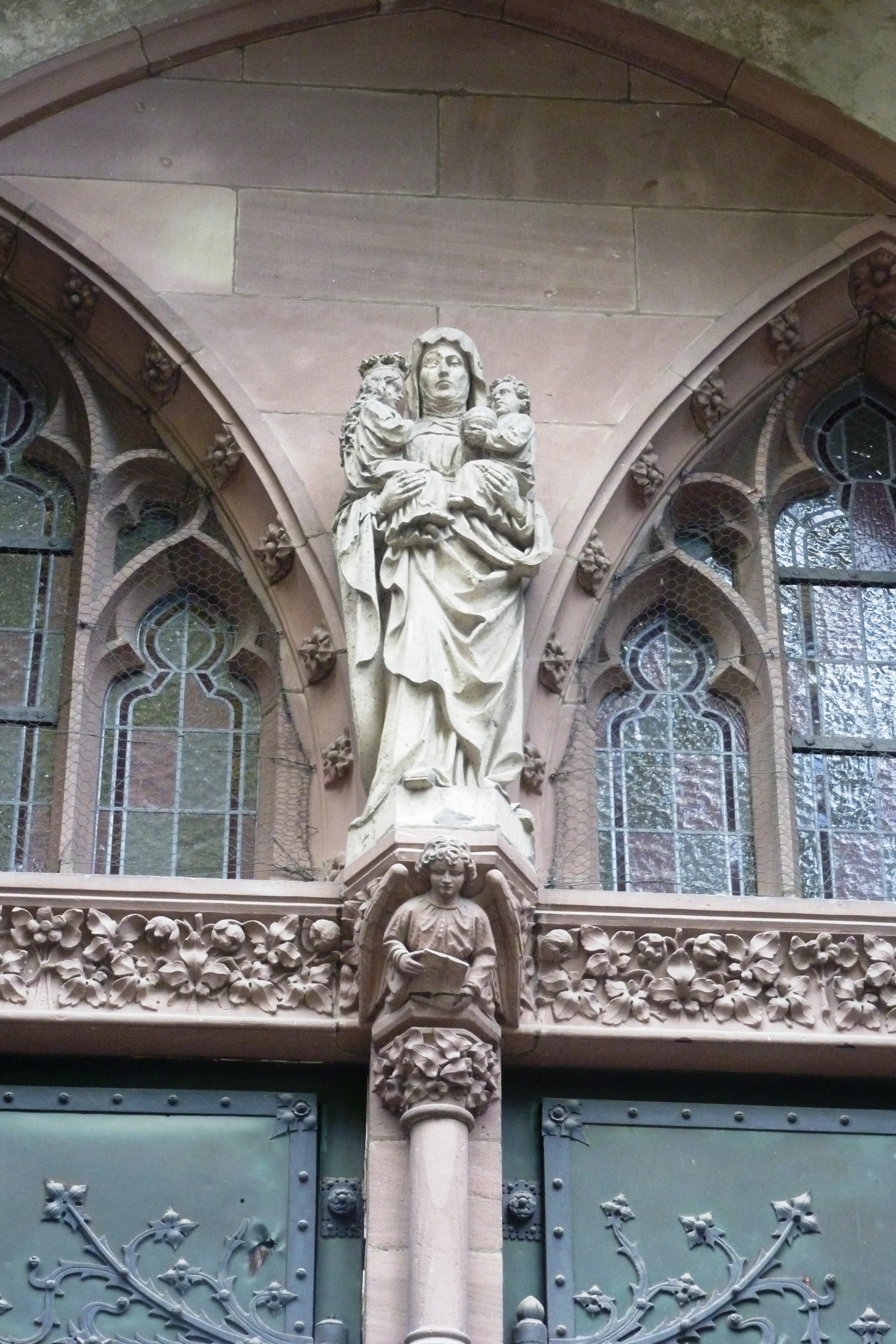

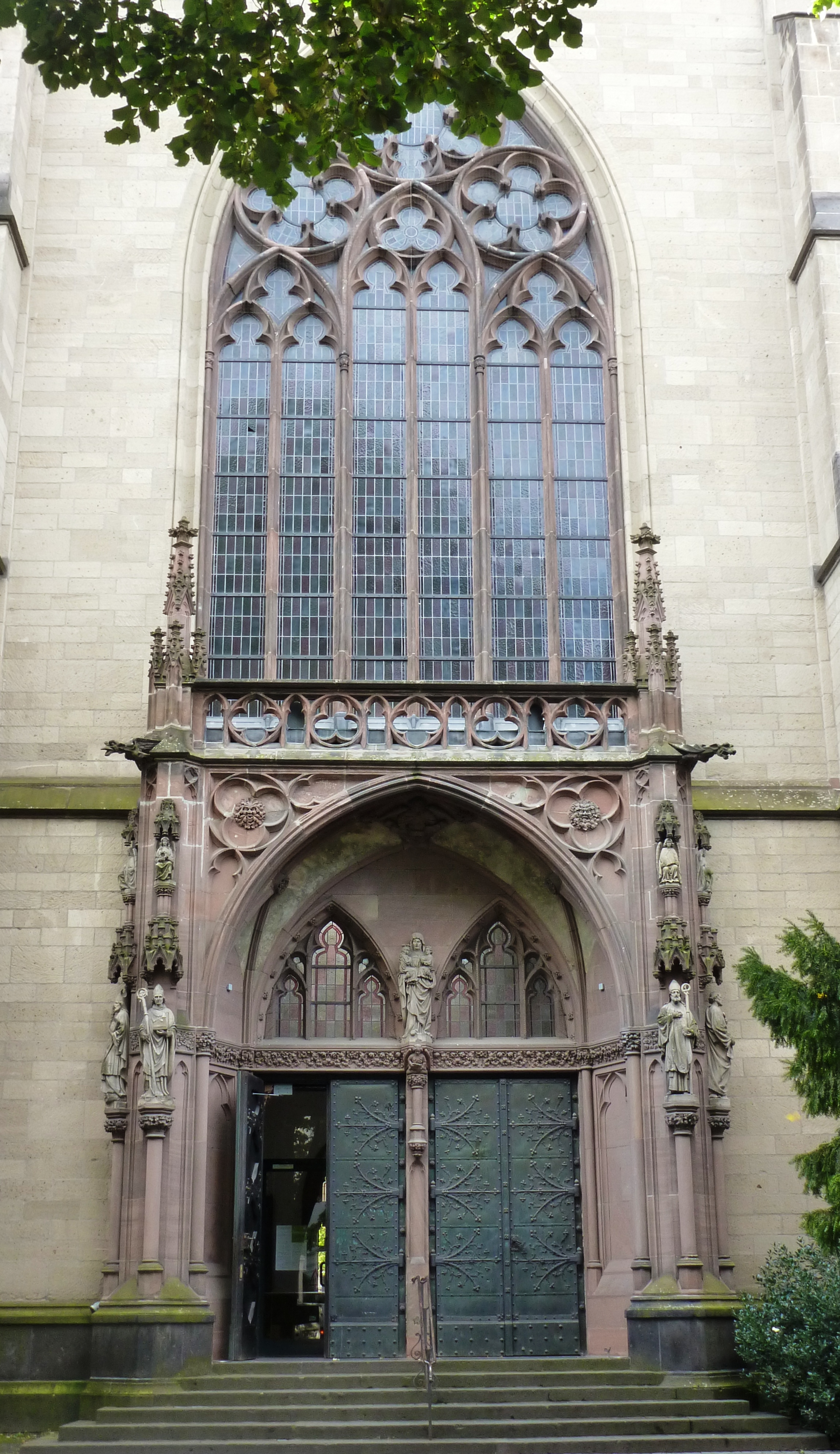

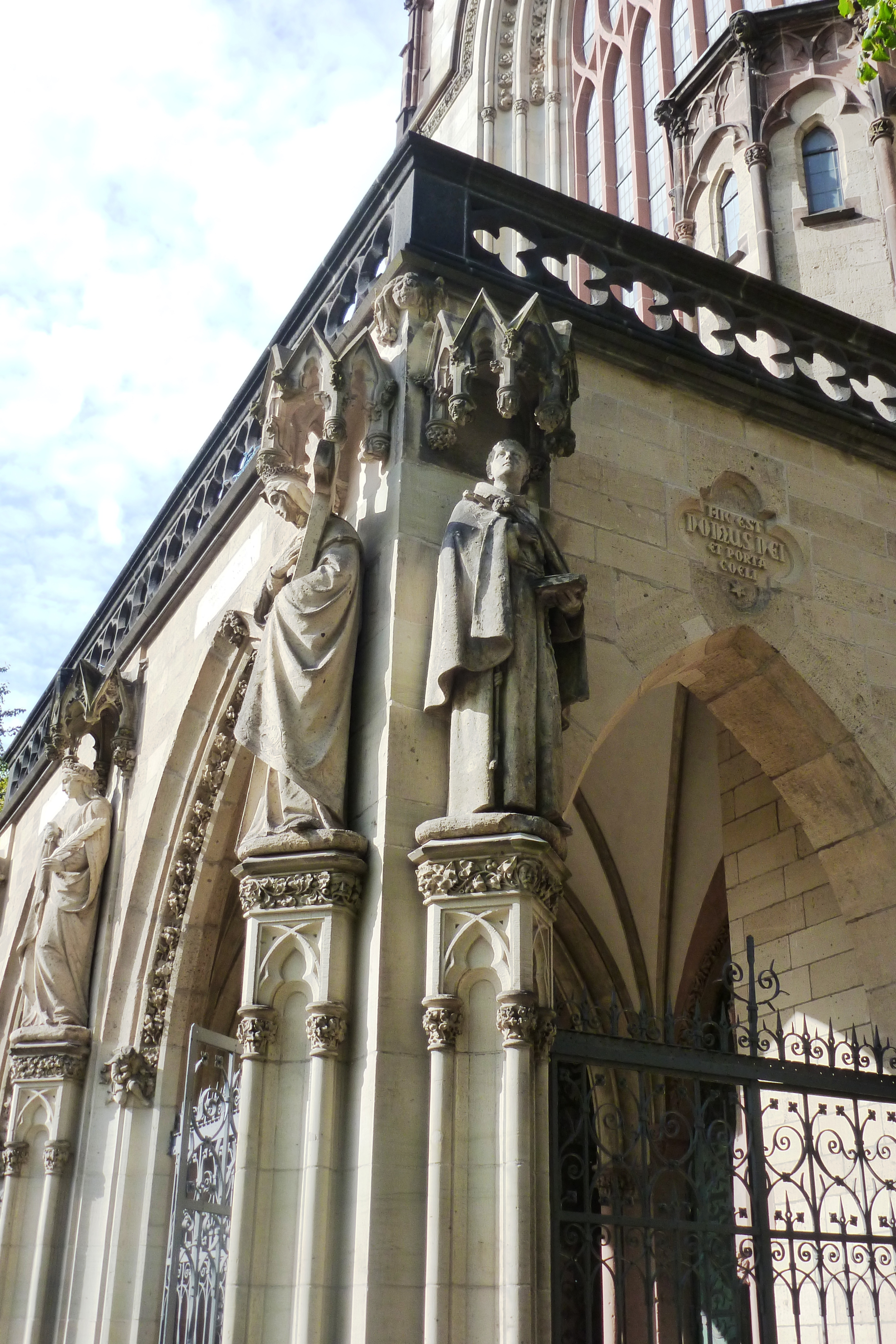

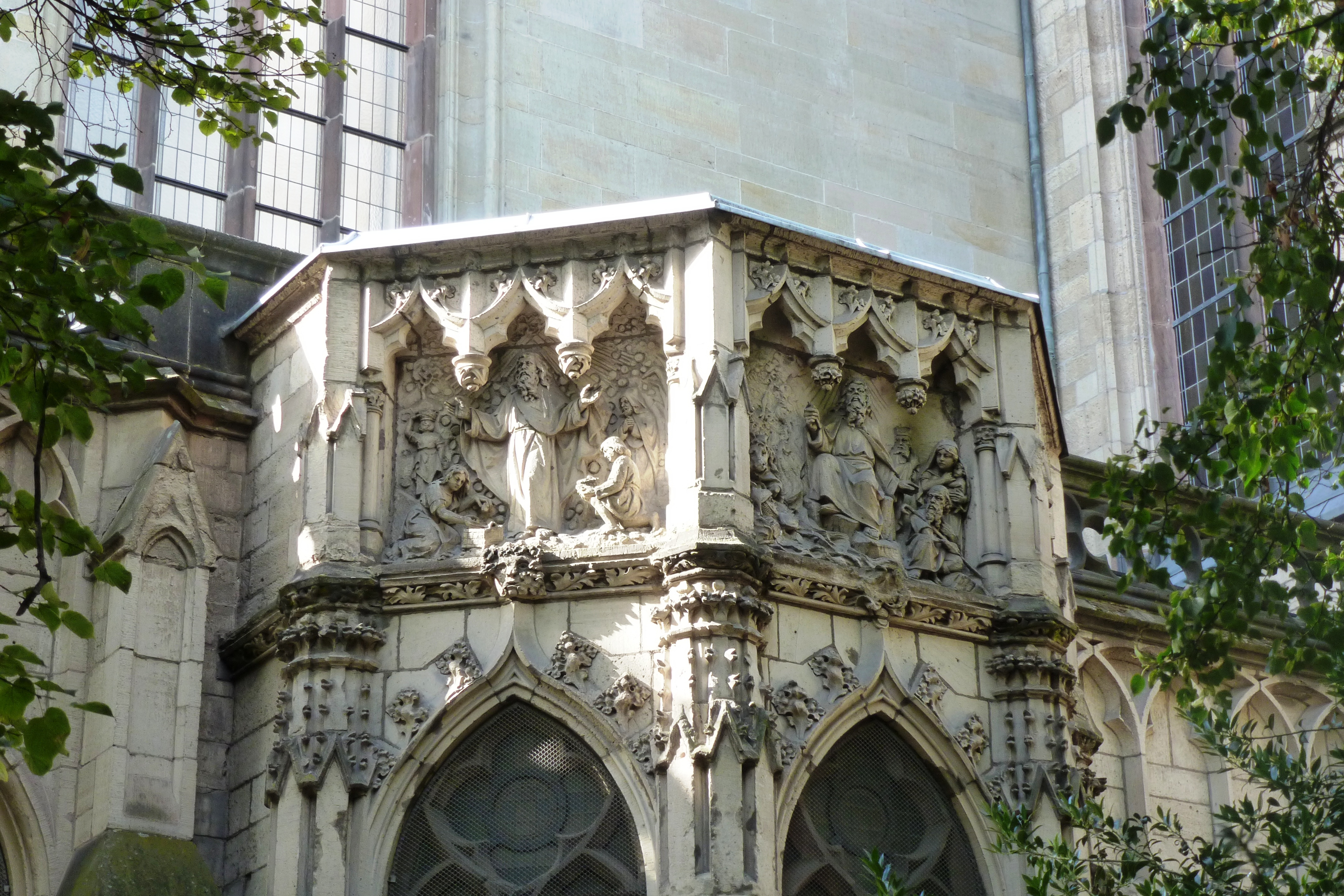

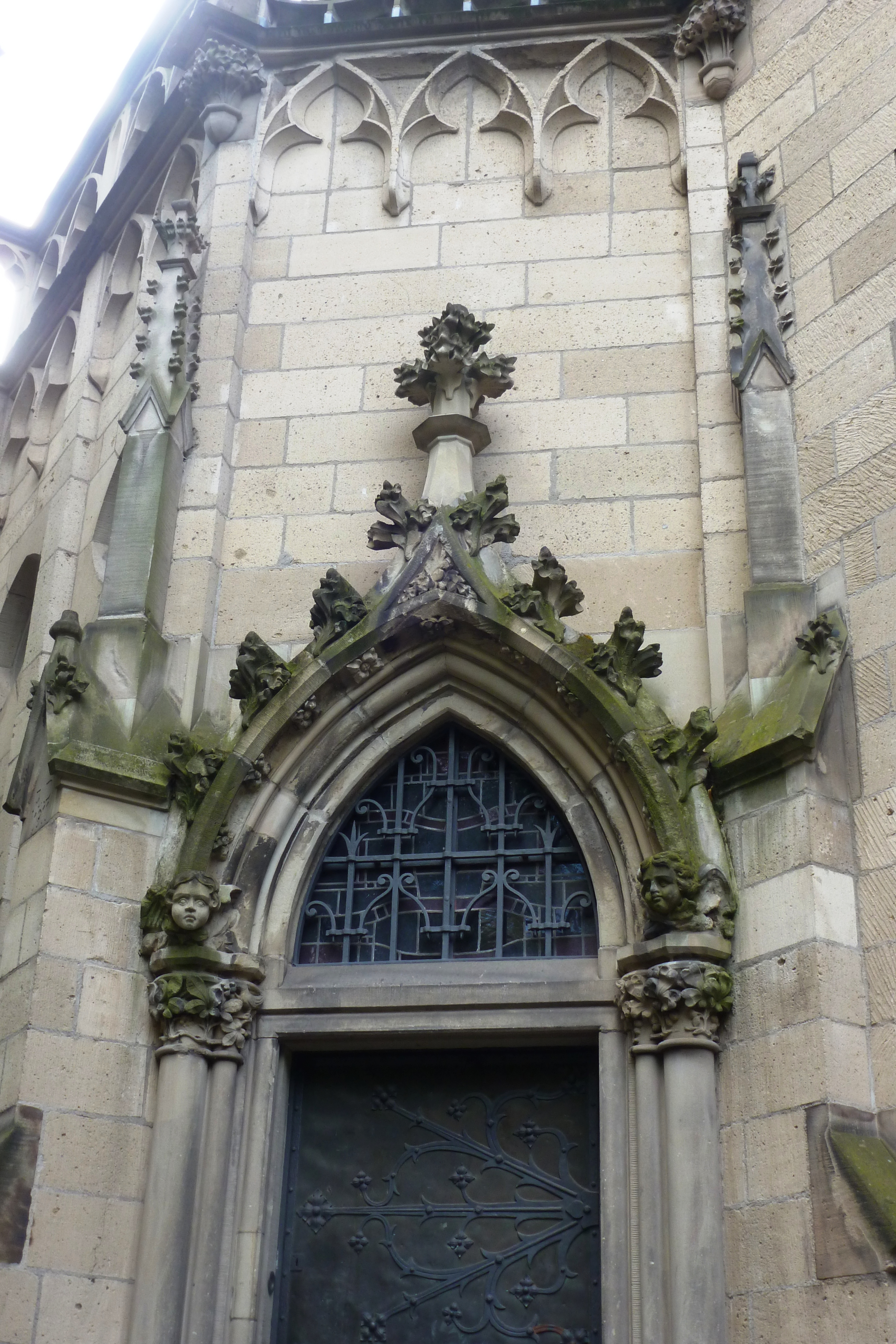

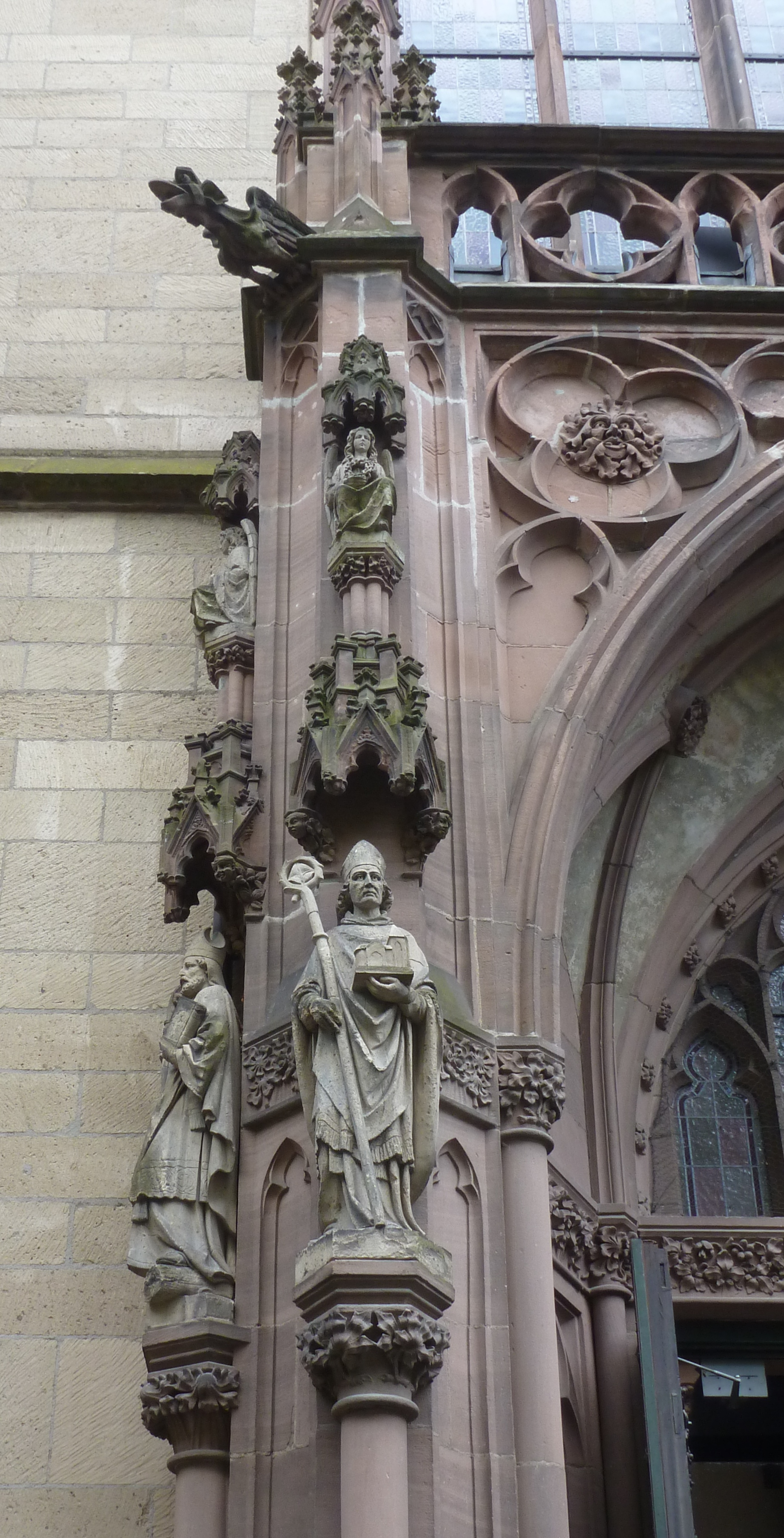

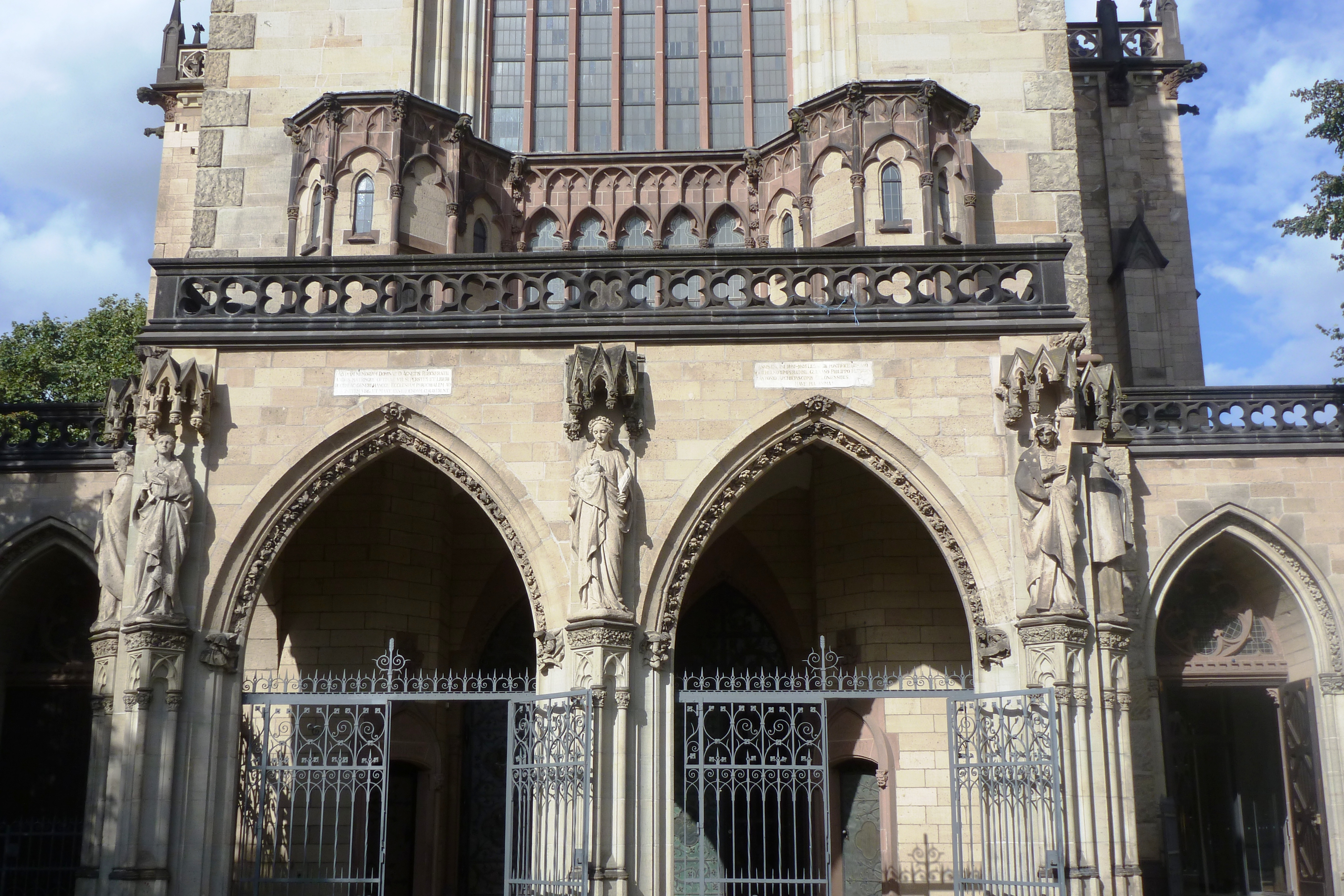

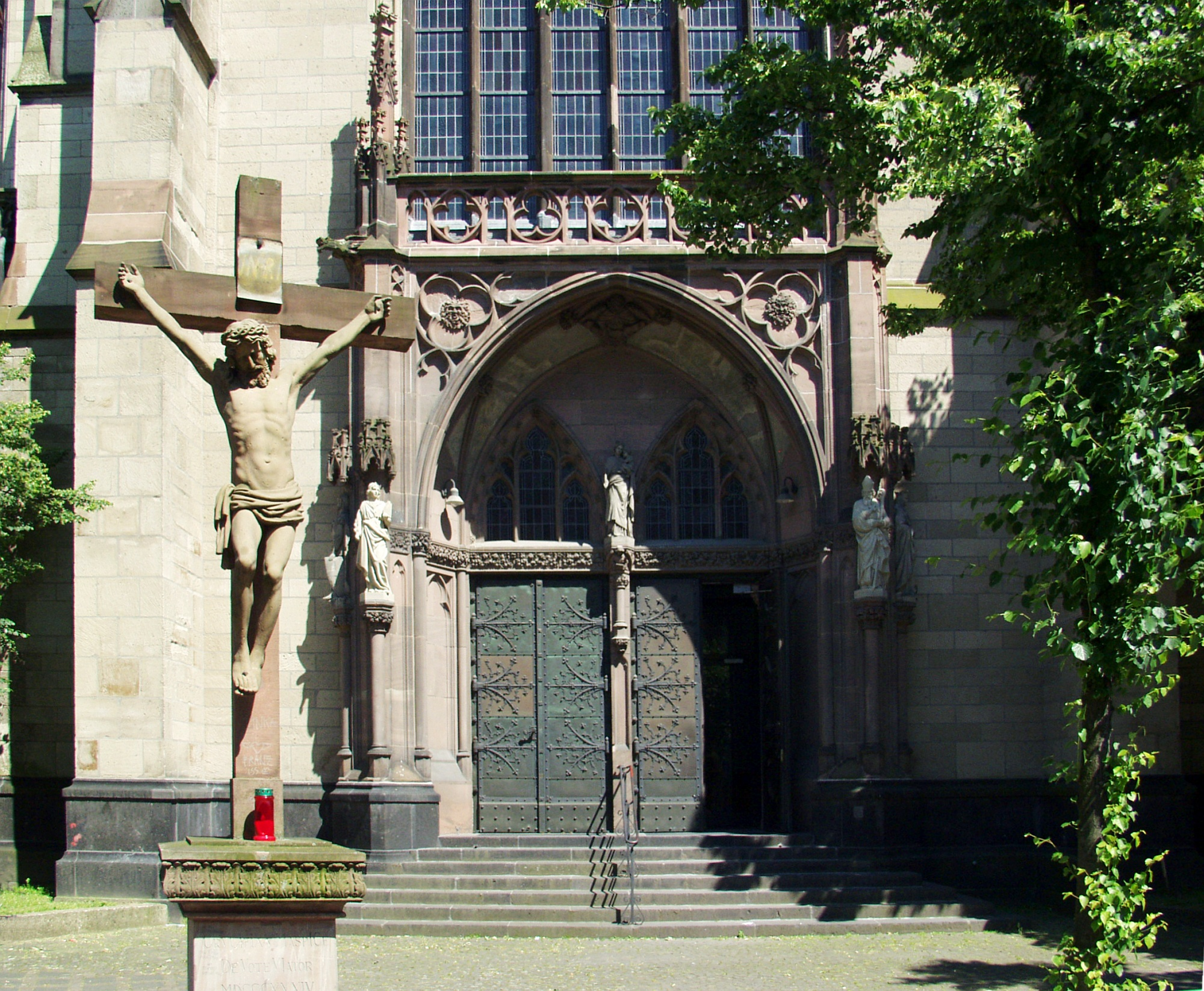
