= St. Agnes Hospital =

St. Agnes Hospital may refer to:

- St. Agnes Hospital (Baltimore)
- St. Agnes Hospital (Fond du Lac, Wisconsin) operated by the Congregation of Sisters of St. Agnes
- St. Agnes Hospital (Raleigh, North Carolina)
