= Sainte-Agnès, Jura =

Commune in Bourgogne-Franche-Comté, France

Sainte-Agnès
- Part of Val-Sonnette
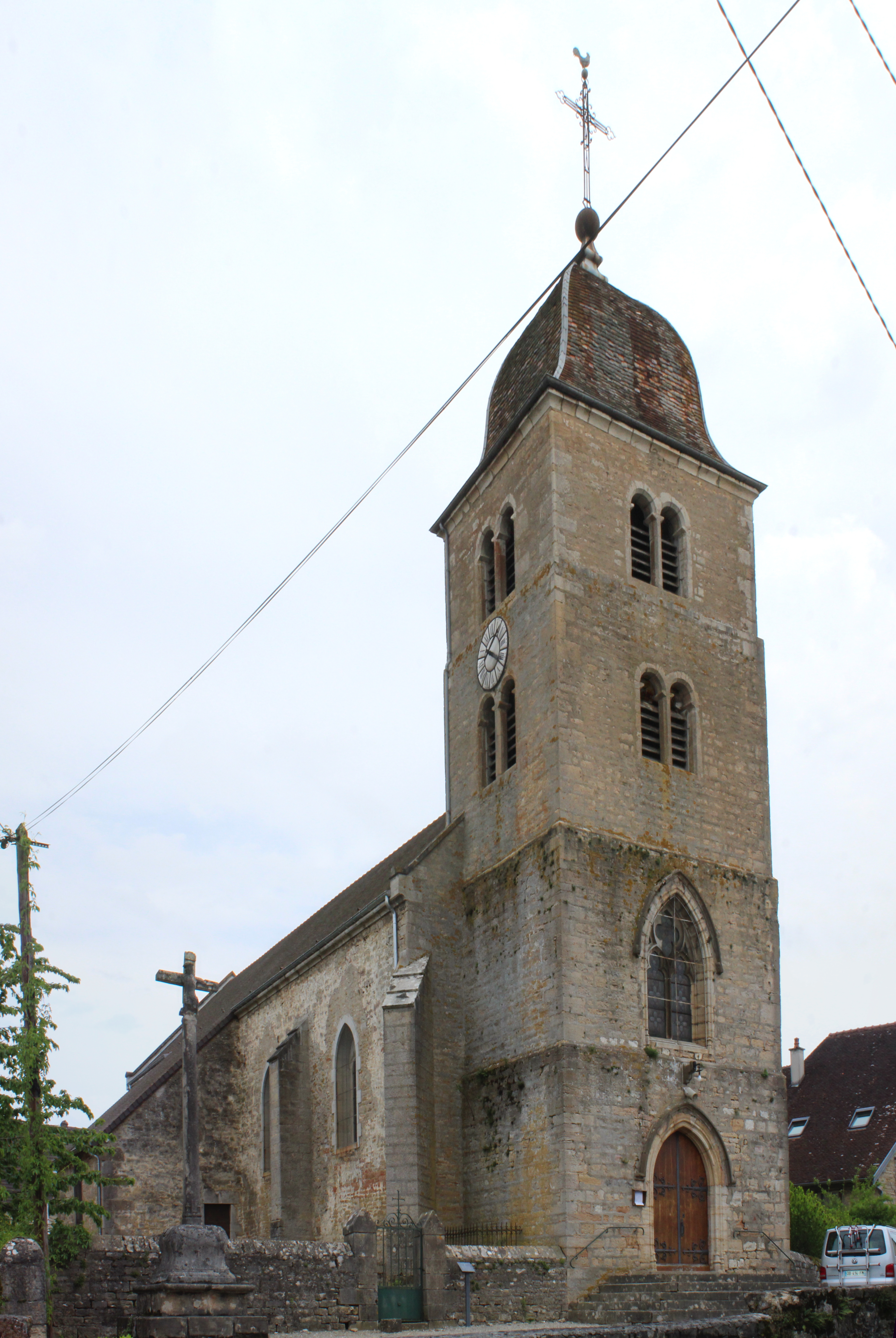
- The church in Sainte-Agnès

- Coat of arms
- Location of Sainte-Agnès
- Location within France Location within Bourgogne-Franche-Comté
- Coordinates: 46°36′32″N 5°28′27″E
- Country: France
- Region: Bourgogne-Franche-Comté
- Department: Jura
- Arrondissement: Lons-le-Saunier
- Canton: Saint-Amour
- Commune: Val-Sonnette
- Area^{1}: 4.08 km^{2} (1.58 sq mi)
- Highest elevation: 342 m (1,122 ft)
- Lowest elevation: 201 m (659 ft)
- Population (2022): 364
  - Density: 89.2/km^{2} (231/sq mi)
- Time zone: UTC+01:00 (CET)
  - Summer (DST): UTC+02:00 (CEST)
- Postal code: 39190
- ^{1} French Land Register data, which excludes lakes, ponds, glaciers > 1 km^{2} (0.386 sq mi or 247 acres) and river estuaries.

Sainte-Agnès (French pronunciation: [sɛ̃t aɲɛs]) is a former commune in the Jura department in the Bourgogne-Franche-Comté region in eastern France. On 1 January 2025, it was merged into the commune of Val-Sonnette.

== Population ==
Historical population
Year	Pop.	±% p.a.
1968	224	—
1975	209	−0.99%
1982	240	+2.00%
1990	301	+2.87%
1999	287	−0.53%
2009	304	+0.58%
2014	355	+3.15%
2020	355	+0.00%
Source: INSEE

== See also ==
- Communes of the Jura department
