= Agnes of Rome =

Christian virgin and saint

Saint Agnes of Rome
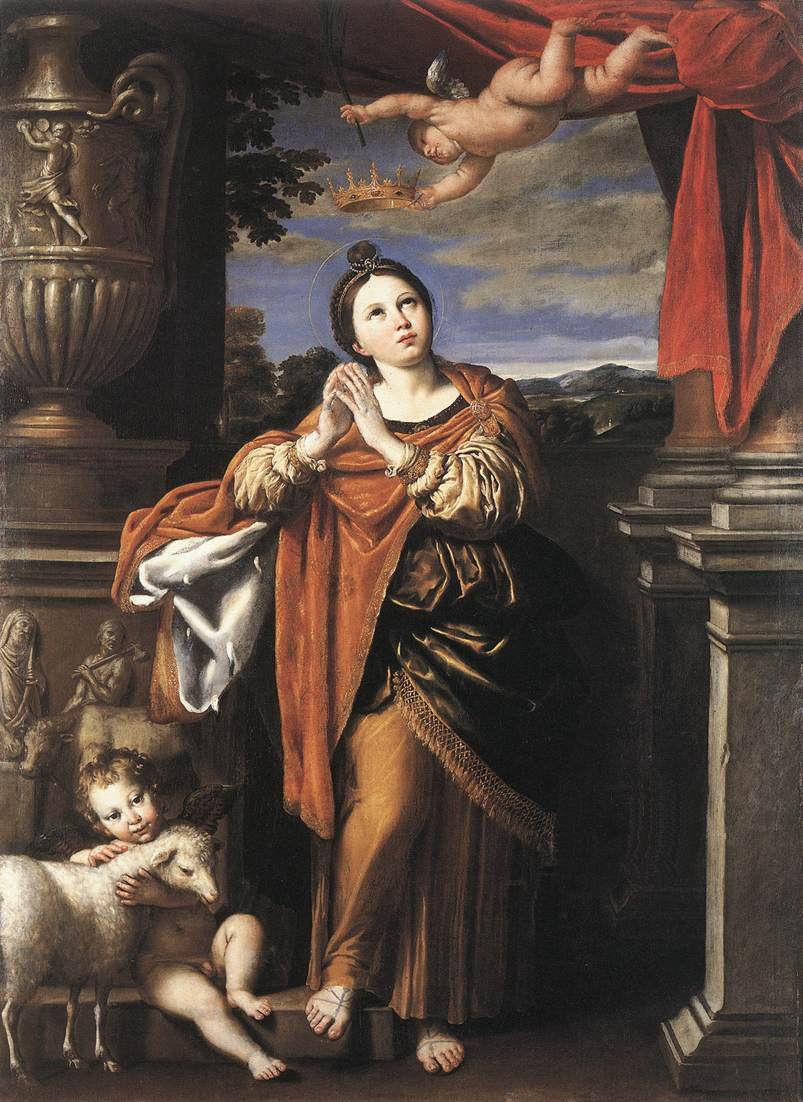
- Saint Agnes by Domenichino (c. 1620)

Virgin and martyr
- Born: c. 291; Rome, Italy, Roman Empire
- Died: 21 January 304 (aged 12–13); Rome, Italy, Roman Empire
- Venerated in: Catholic Church; Eastern Orthodox Church; Oriental Orthodox Churches; Anglican Churches; Lutheran Churches
- Canonized: Pre-congregation
- Major shrine: Church of Sant'Agnese fuori le mura and the Church of Sant'Agnese in Agone, both in Rome
- Feast: 21 January; before Pope John XXIII revised the calendar, there was a second feast on 28 January
- Attributes: Lamb, martyr's palm, sword
- Patronage: Girls; chastity and virgins; victims of sexual abuse; betrothed couples; gardeners; Girl Guides; the Diocese of Rockville Centre, New York; Children of Mary; Collegio Capranica, Rome; the city of Fresno

Agnes of Rome (c. 291 – 21 January 304) was a Roman Christian adolescent who was executed for her faith in the 4th century. She is venerated as a virgin martyr and as a saint in the Catholic Church, Oriental Orthodox Church and the Eastern Orthodox Church, as well as the Anglican Communion and Lutheran Churches. She is one of several virgin martyrs commemorated by name in the Canon of the Mass, and one of many Christians martyred during the reign of the Roman emperor Diocletian.

Agnes was born in 291 into Roman nobility, and raised as a Christian. She suffered martyrdom on 21 January 304, aged 12 or 13. Her high-ranking suitors, slighted by her resolute devotion to religious purity, sought to persecute her for her beliefs. Her father urged her to deny God, but she refused, and she was dragged naked through the streets to a brothel, then tried and sentenced to death. She was eventually beheaded, after attempts for her to be burnt at the stake failed. A few days after her death, her foster-sister Emerentiana was found praying by her tomb, and was stoned to death.

An early account of Agnes, stressing her young age, steadfastness and virginity was written by the 4th-century theologian, St Ambrose. Since the Middle Ages, she has traditionally been depicted as a young girl with her long hair with a lamb (the symbol of her virginal innocence and her name), a sword, and a palm branch (an attribute of her martyrdom). Her bones are beneath the high altar of the church built over her tomb in Rome. Her skull is preserved in the church of Sant'Agnese in Agone, Rome.

== Biography ==
According to tradition, Agnes was born in 291 into Roman nobility, and raised as a Christian. She suffered martyrdom on 21 January 304, aged 12 or 13, and during the reign of the Roman emperor Diocletian. A beautiful young girl, Agnes had many suitors who were young men of high rank. Slighted by her resolute devotion to religious purity, they submitted her name to the authorities as a follower of Christianity. One of them, a man named Procop, brought Agnes to his father, who was the local governor. He urged Agnes to deny God, but she refused.

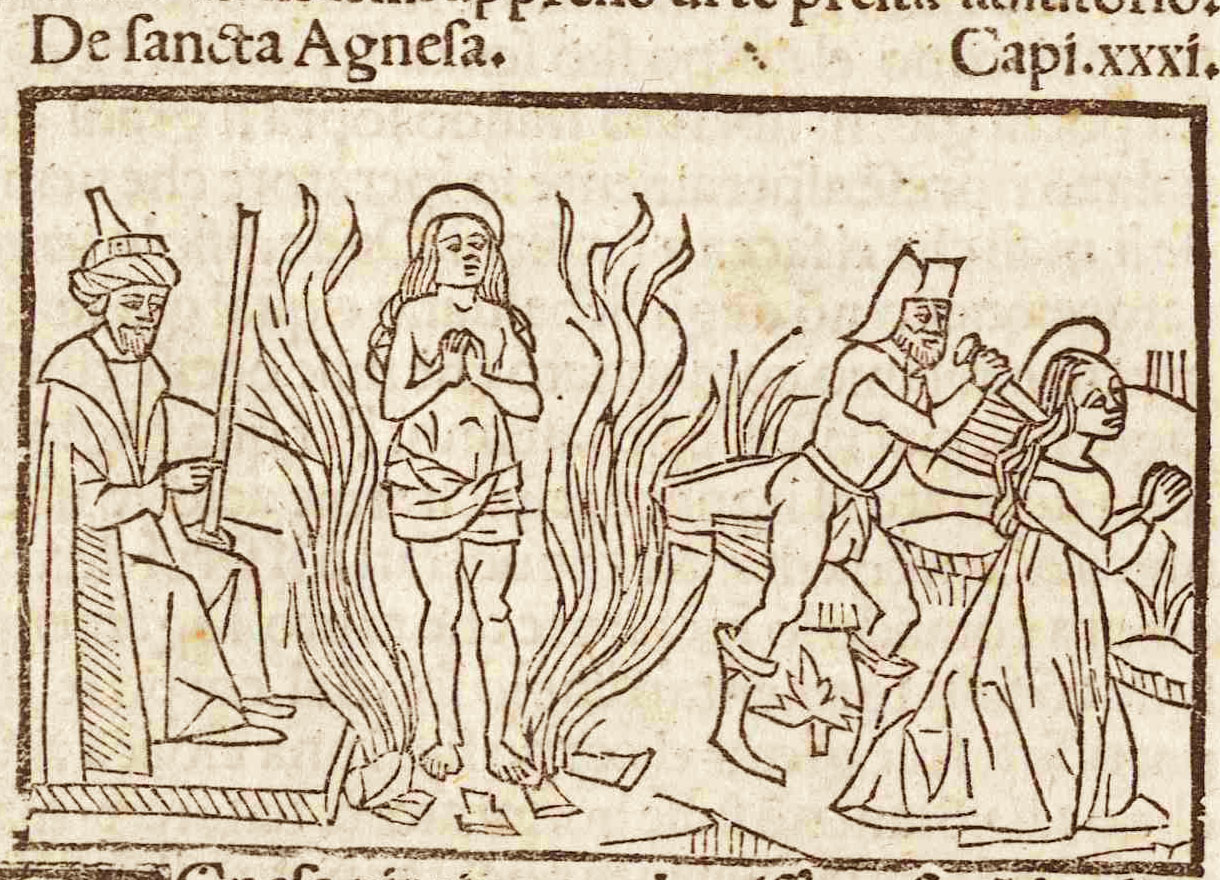
The Martyrdom of Agnes in the Golden Legend (1497)

The Prefect Sempronius condemned Agnes to be dragged naked through the streets to a brothel. In one account, as she prayed, her hair grew and covered her body. It was also said that all of the men who attempted to rape her were immediately struck blind. The son of the prefect was struck dead but revived after she prayed for him, causing her release. At the start of Agnes' trial, Sempronius recused himself, and another figure presided. After Agnes was sentenced to death, she was led out and bound to a stake to be burned, but the bundle of wood would not burn, or the flames parted away from her. The officer in charge of the troops drew his sword and beheaded her—or, in other texts, stabbed her in the throat. It is said that when Agnes' blood poured to the stadium floor, other Christians soaked it up with cloths.

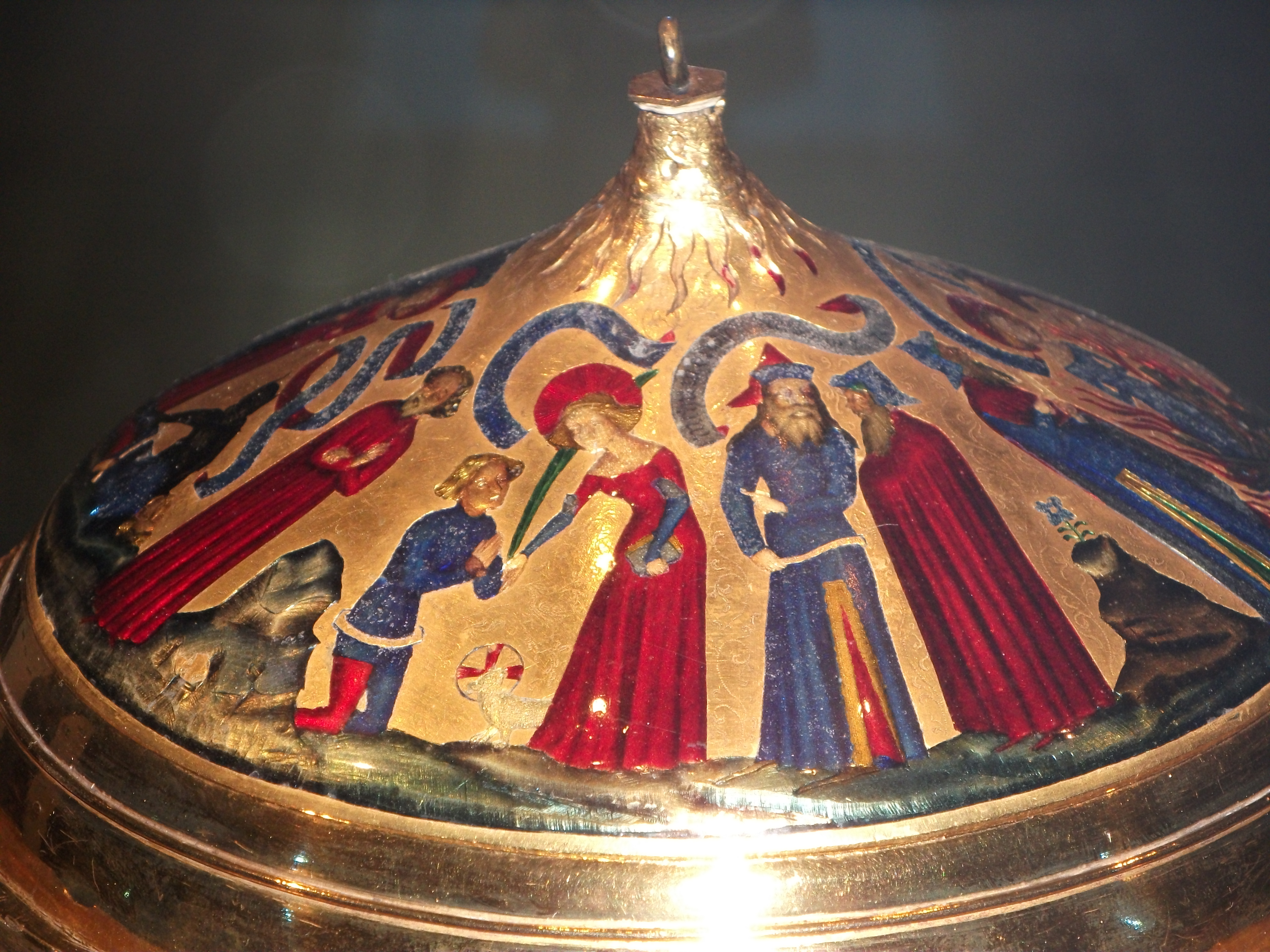
Agnes depicted on the medieval Royal Gold Cup in the British Museum

Agnes was buried beside the Via Nomentana in Rome. A few days after her death, her foster-sister, Emerentiana, was found praying by the tomb. Emerentiana claimed to be the daughter of Agnes' wet nurse. She was stoned to death after refusing to leave the place and reprimanding the people for killing her foster-sister. Emerentiana was also later canonized. The daughter of Constantine I, Constantina, was said to have been cured of leprosy after praying at Agnes' tomb. She and Emerentiana appear in the scenes from the life of Agnes on the 14th-century Royal Gold Cup in the British Museum in London.

An early account of Agnes' death, stressing her young age, steadfastness and virginity, but not the legendary features of the tradition, is given by the 4th-century theologian, Ambrose. Ambrose juxtaposed the confidence of Agnes at the time of her death with the executioner, who trembles at the fear of his own condemnation. Because of both her steadfastness and virginity, Ambrose wrote that Agnes attained a "twofold martyrdom".

The broader social circumstances of her martyrdom are believed to be largely authentic, though the legend cannot be proven true, and many details of the 5th-century Acts of Saint Agnes have been challenged. A church was built over her tomb, and her relics venerated.

== Veneration ==
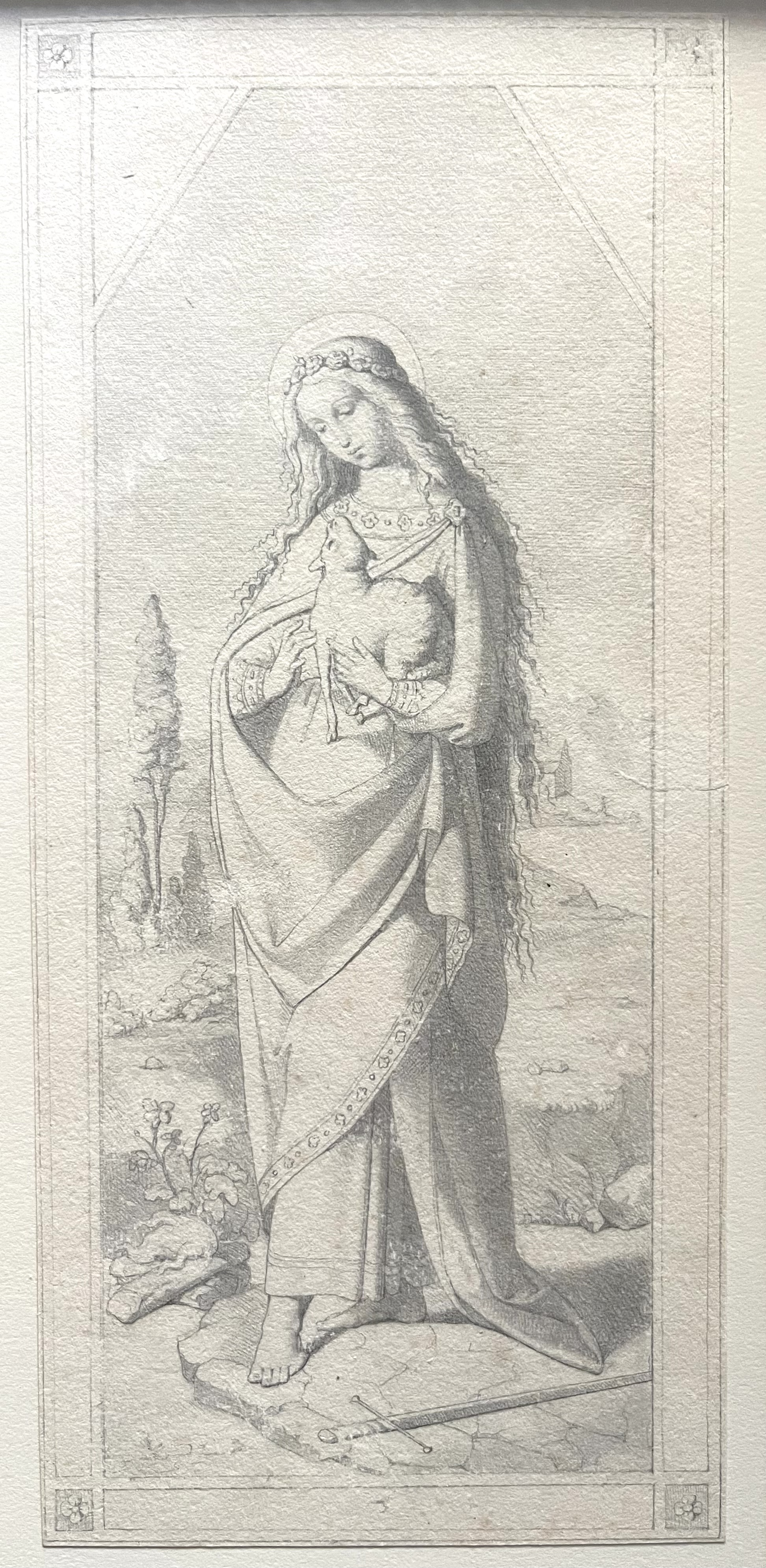
Drawing by Johann Overbeck of St. Agnes

Agnes was venerated as a saint at least as early as the time of St Ambrose, based on an existing homily. She is commemorated in the Depositio Martyrum of Filocalus (354) and in the early Roman Sacramentaries.

Saint Agnes' bones are conserved beneath the high altar in the church of Sant'Agnese fuori le mura in Rome, built over the catacomb that housed her tomb. Her skull is preserved in a separate chapel in the church of Sant'Agnese in Agone in Rome's Piazza Navona.

Agnes is remembered in the Anglican Communion with a Lesser Festival on 21 January.

St Agnes is venerated as a saint in the Catholic Church, Oriental Orthodox Church and the Eastern Orthodox Church, as well as the Anglican Communion and Lutheran Churches.

=== Patronage ===
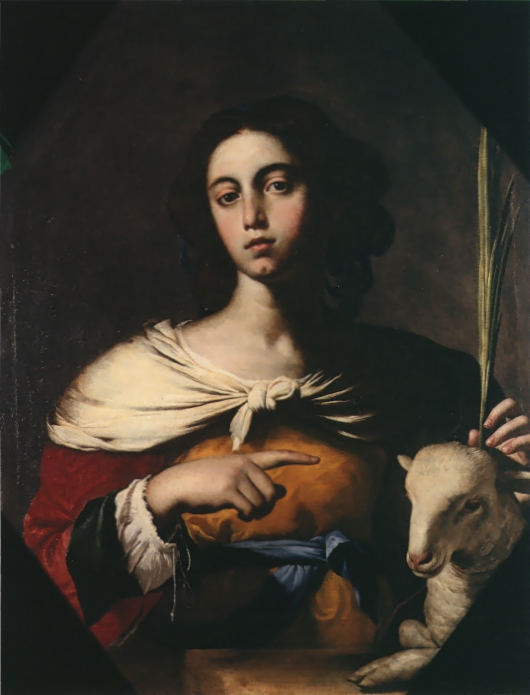
Santa Inés, Guarino, 1650

Because of the legend around her martyrdom, Saint Agnes is patron saint of those seeking chastity and purity. She is also the patron saint of young girls and girl scouts. Folk custom called for them to practise rituals on Saint Agnes' Eve (20–21 January) with a view to discovering their future husbands. This superstition has been immortalised in John Keats's poem The Eve of Saint Agnes.

=== Iconography ===
Since the Middle Ages, Saint Agnes has traditionally been depicted as a young girl with her long hair down, with a lamb, the symbol of both her virginal innocence and her name, and a sword (together with the palm branch an attribute of her martyrdom). The lamb, which is agnus in the Latin language, is also the linguistic link to the traditional blessing of lambs. Saint Agnes has been depicted with a lamb since the 4th century.

=== Blessing of the lambs ===
On the feast of Saint Agnes, two lambs are traditionally brought from the Trappist abbey of Tre Fontane in Rome to be blessed by the Pope. In summer, the lambs are shorn, and the wool is used to weave the pallia, which the Pope gives on the feast of Saint Peter and Paul to the newly appointed metropolitan archbishops as a sign of his jurisdiction and their union with the pope. This tradition of the blessing of the lambs has been known since the 16th century.

=== Notable churches ===
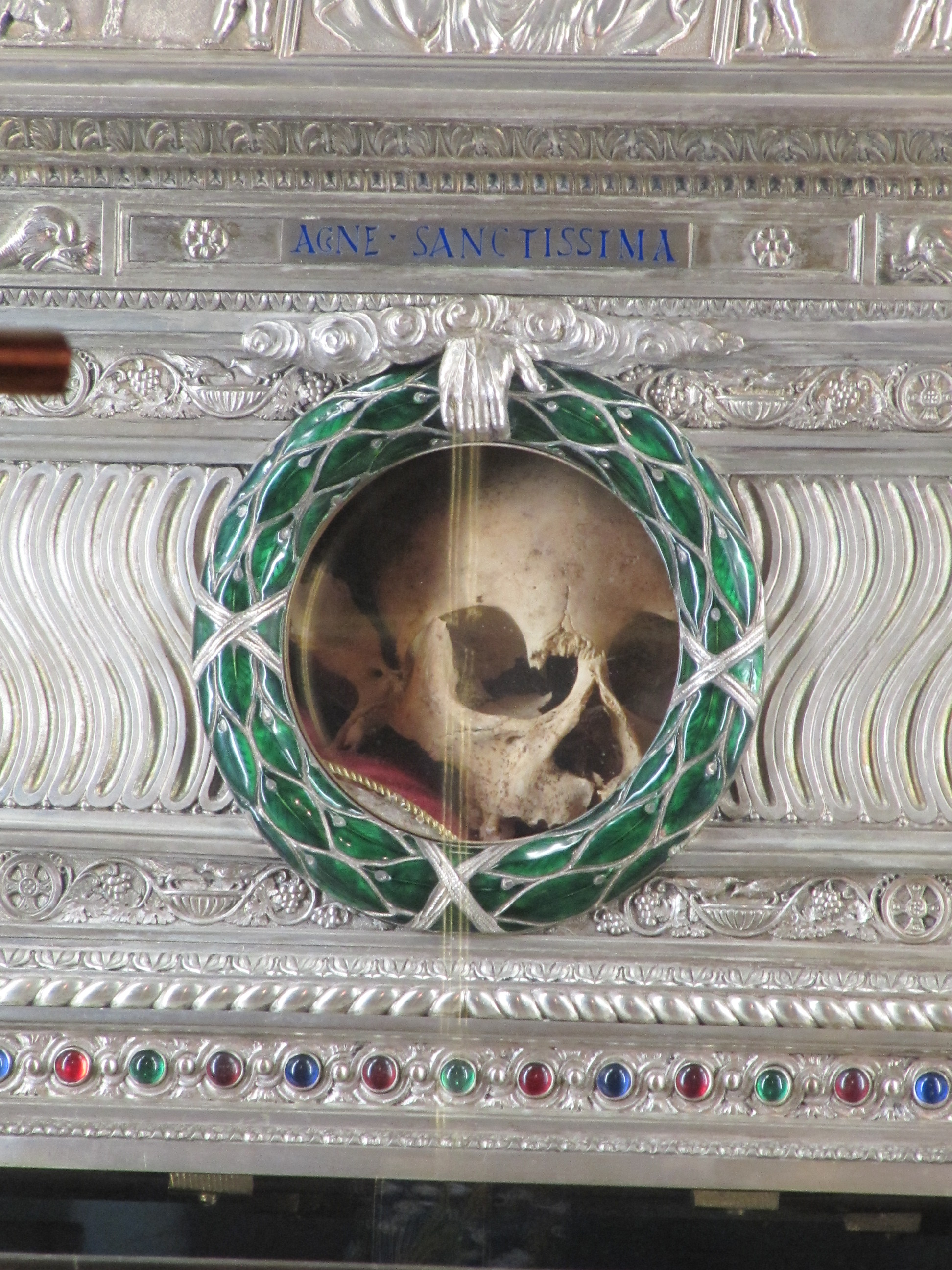
The relic of the skull of Saint Agnes in Sant'Agnese in Agone, Rome

- St. Agnes Anglican Church Grange, Hanover, Jamaica
- Basilica of St James and St Agnes, Nysa, Poland
- St Agnes Cathedral, Rockville Centre, New York
- St Agnes Church, New York City
- Church of the Ascension and Saint Agnes, Washington, D.C.
- St. Agnes' Parish, Toronto, Ontario
- Sant'Agnese in Agone, Rome
- Sant'Agnese fuori le mura, Rome
- Sainte-Agnès, Lac-Mégantic, Quebec, Canada
- St Agnes, St Agnes, Cornwall, England
- St Agnes, Cologne, Germany
- St Agnes, Cawston, Norfolk, England
- St Agnes' Church, St Agnes, Isles of Scilly, England
- St Agnes Cathedral, Springfield, Missouri, US
- St Agnes Church, Saint Paul, Minnesota
- St. Agnes Catholic Church, Key Biscayne, Florida

=== Legacy ===
The Congregation of Sisters of St. Agnes is a Catholic religious community for women based in Fond du Lac, Wisconsin, US. It was founded in 1858, by Father Caspar Rehrl, an Austrian missionary, who established the sisterhood of pioneer women under the patronage of Agnes, to whom he had a particular devotion.

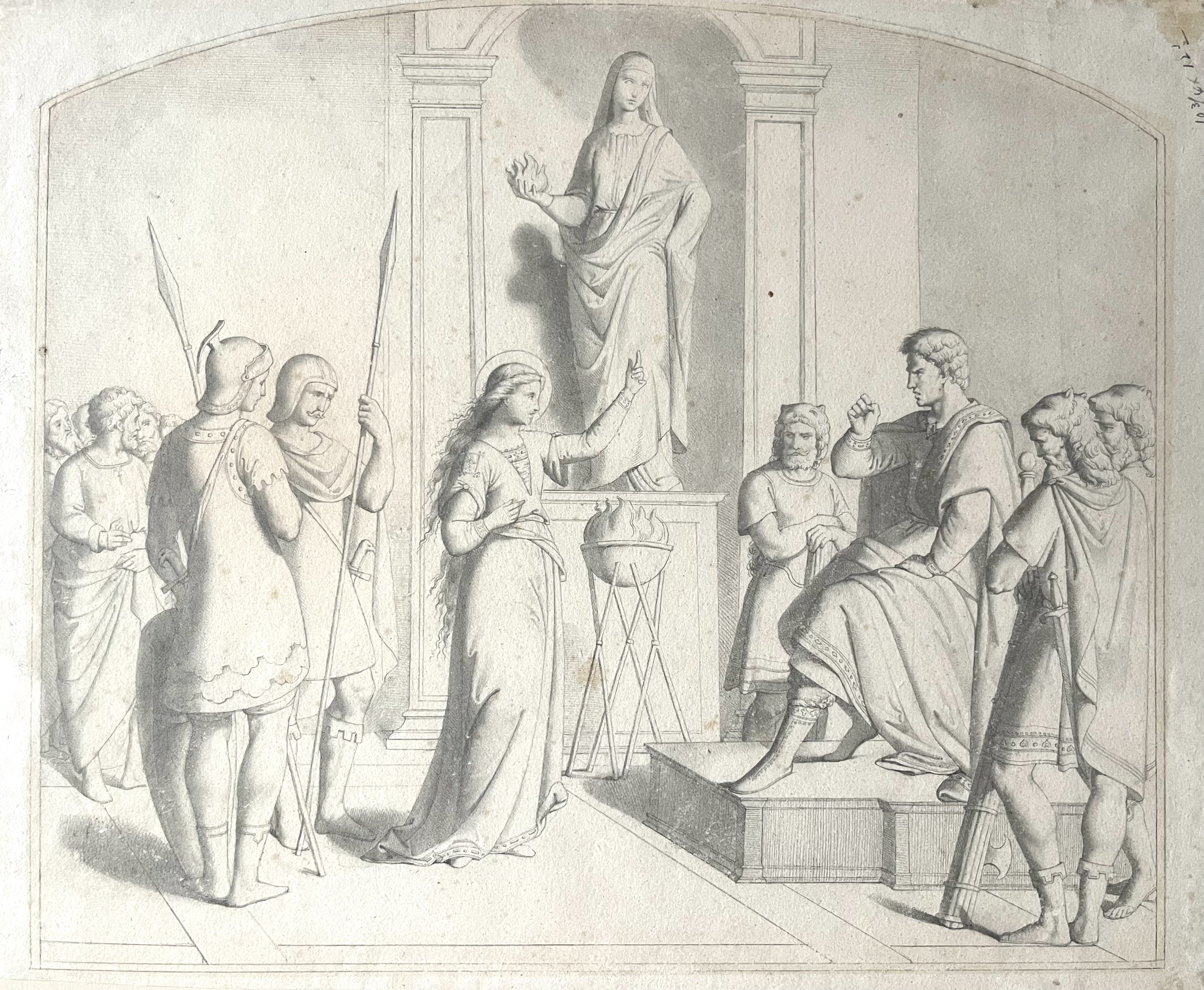
Graphite pencil drawing of Saint Agnes by Johann Overbeck

The city of Santa Ynez, California is named after her.

=== In Art ===
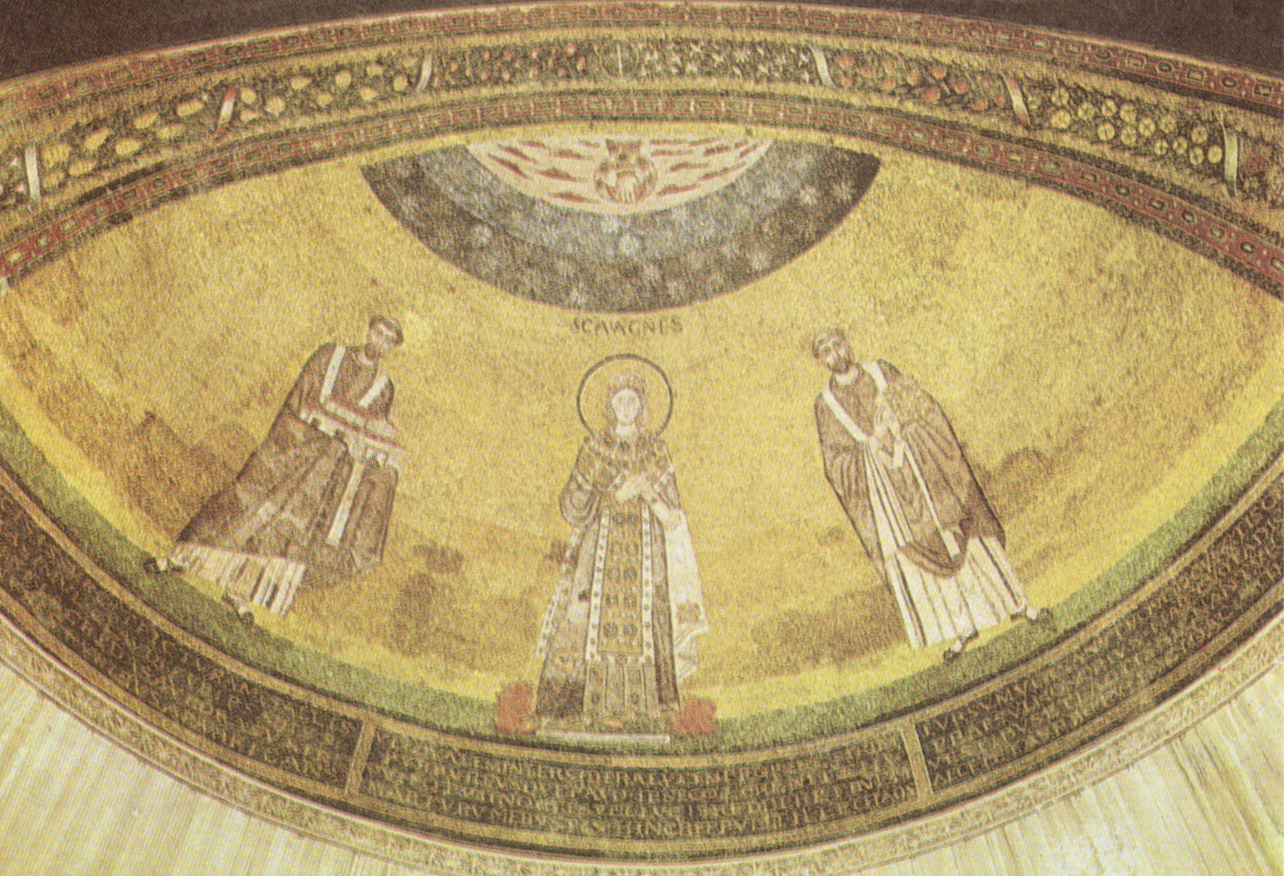
Saint Agnes and saints, apse mosaic of Sant’Agnese fuori le mura (c. 625–638)

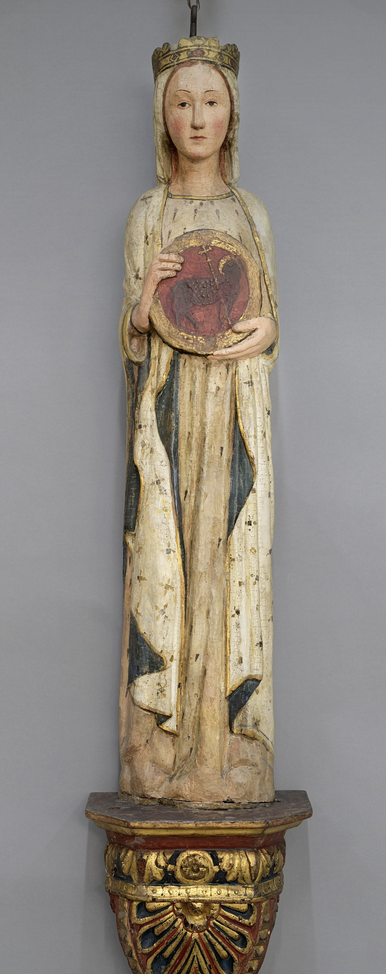
Saint Agnes, Master of St. Catherine Gualino (1315)

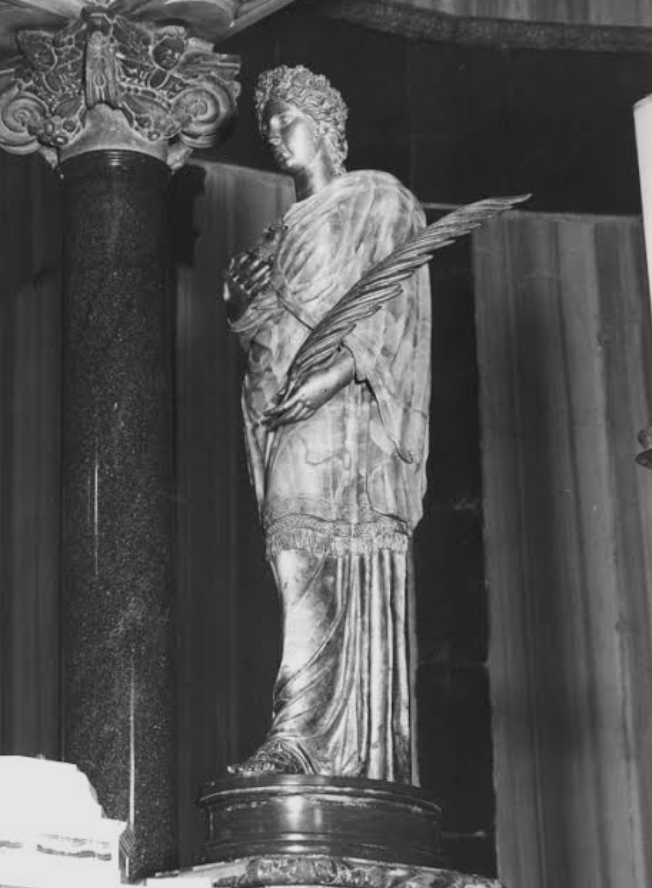
Saint Agnes, Nicolas Cordier (16th c.)

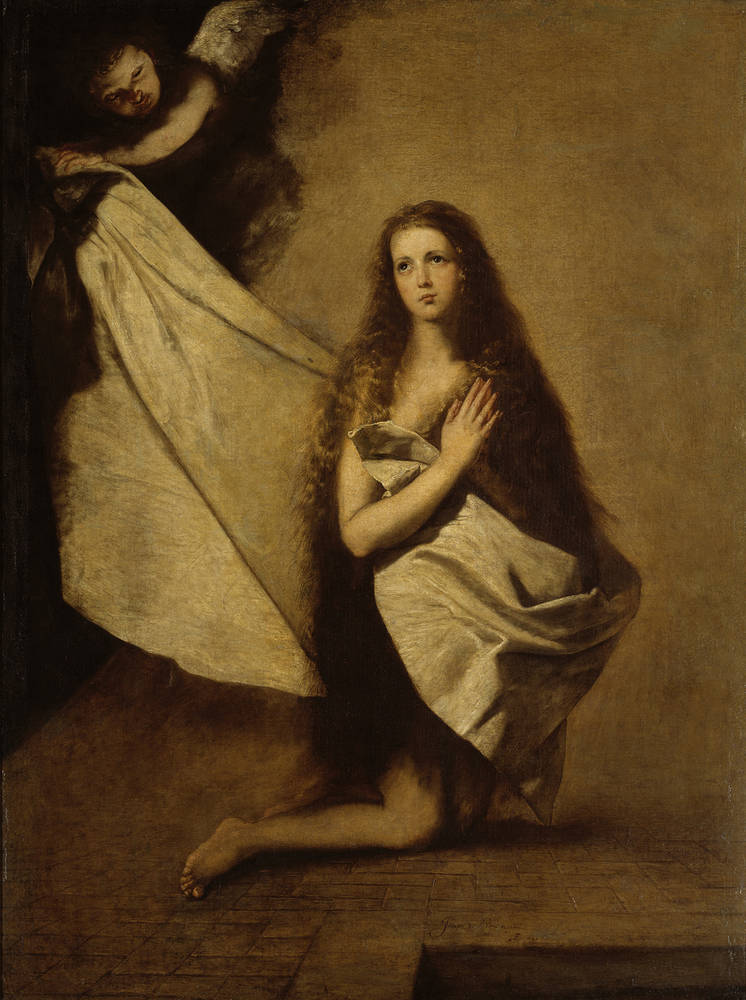
St. Agnes in prison, Jusepe de Ribera (1641)

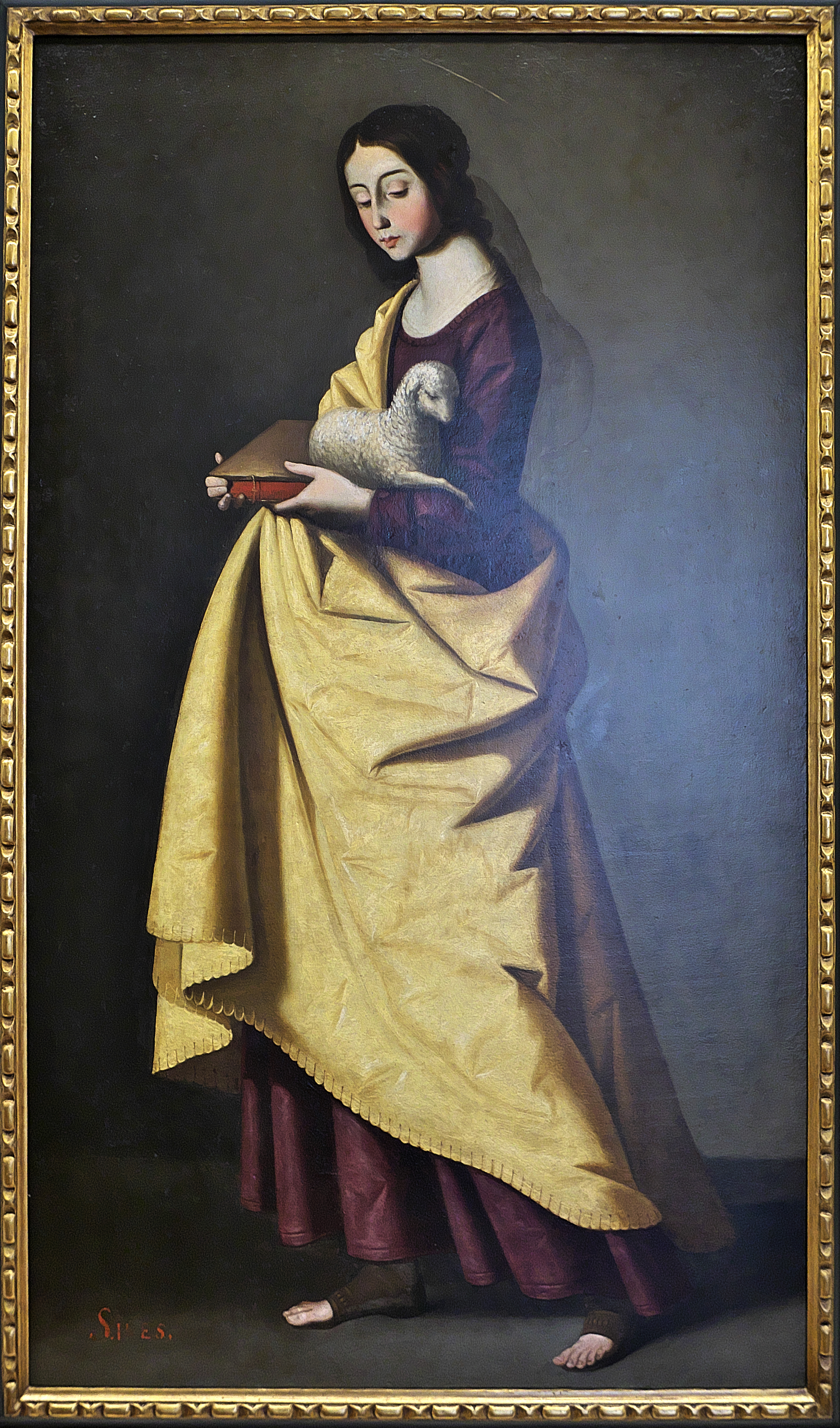
Saint Agnes, Francisco de Zurbarán (1635–1642)

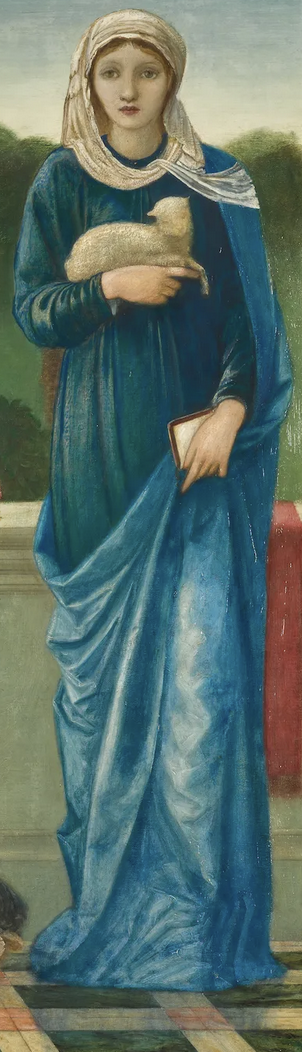
Ss. Barbara, Dorothy, and Agnes (detail), Edward Burne-Jones (1869)

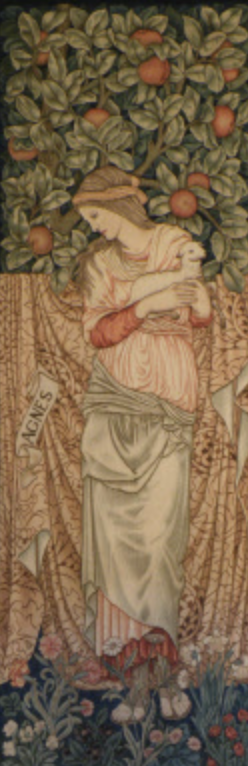
Saint Agnes, Edward Burne-Jones, (1887)

== Cultural references ==
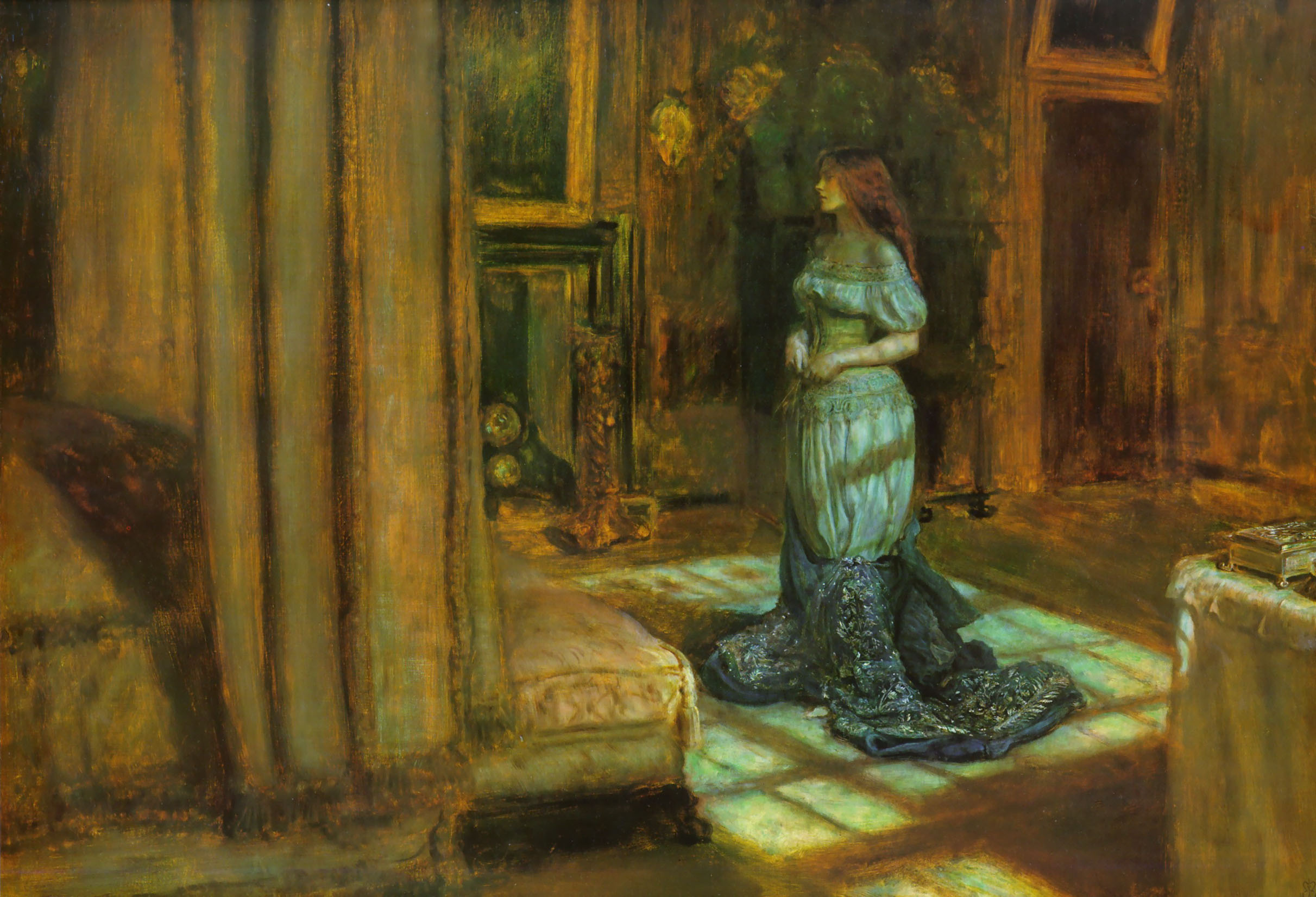
The Eve of St Agnes by John Everett Millais, 1863

Hrotsvitha, the 10th-century nun and poet, wrote a heroic poem about Agnes.

In the historical novel Fabiola or, the Church of the Catacombs, written by Cardinal Nicholas Wiseman in 1854, Agnes is the soft-spoken teenage cousin and confidante of the protagonist, the beautiful noblewoman Fabiola.

The Eve of St. Agnes is a Romantic narrative poem written by John Keats in 1819.

St. Agnes’ Eve is a poem by Alfred Tennyson first published in 1837.

The instrumental song "Saint Agnes and the Burning Train" appears on the 1991 album The Soul Cages by Sting.

The song "Bear's Vision of St. Agnes" appears on the 2012 album Ten Stories by rock band mewithoutYou.

The St. Agnes Library is a branch of the New York Public Library located on the Upper West Side of Manhattan, on Amsterdam Avenue between West 81st and West 82nd Streets.
