= St. Agnes (poem) =

St. Agnes' Eve
- by Alfred Tennyson
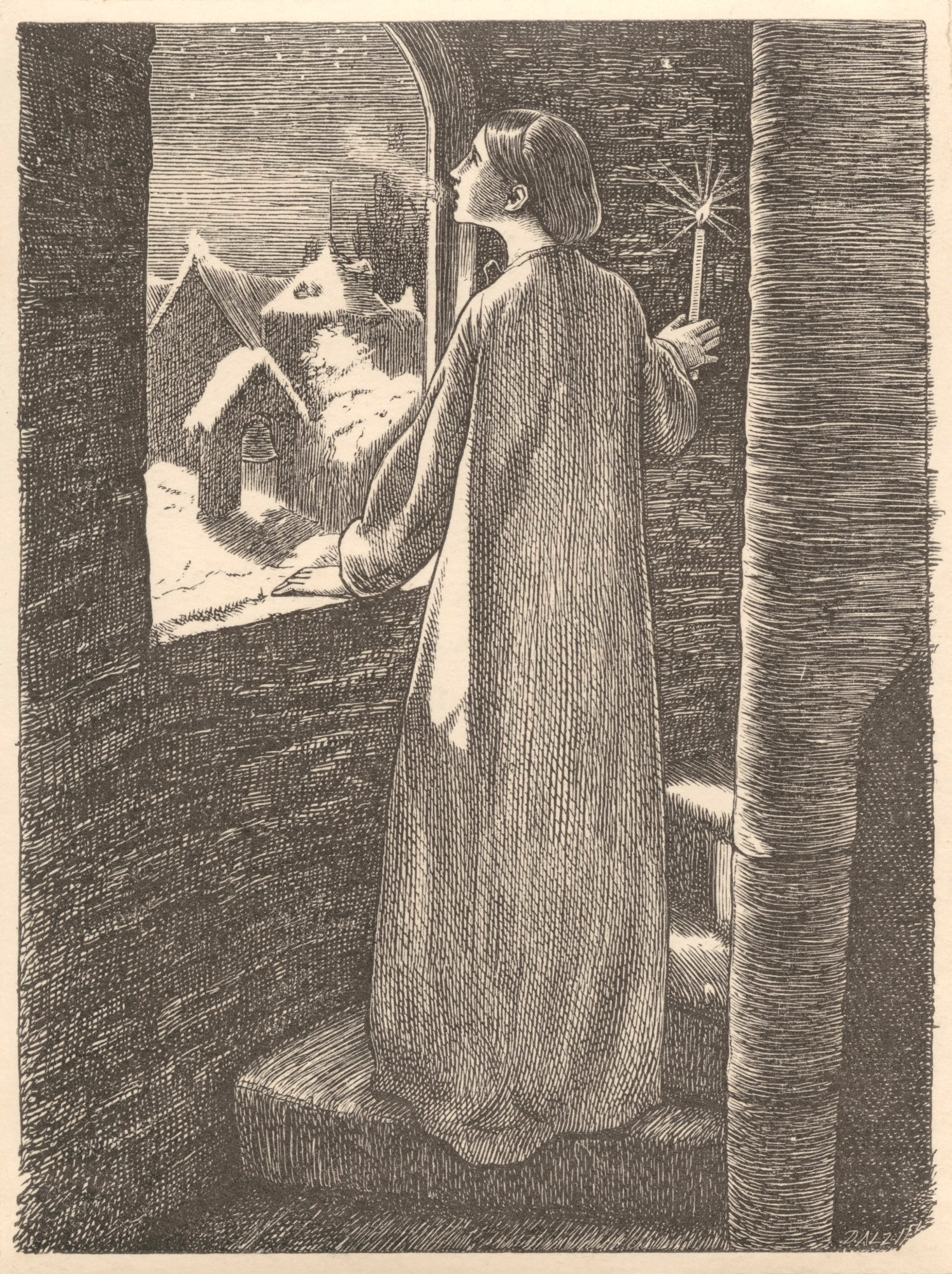
- St. Agnes Eve. Wood engraving by Dalziel after a design by J. E. Millais. Published in Moxon's edition of Tennyson (1857)
- Genre(s): Romanticism
- Meter: Iambic tetrameter Iambic trimeter
- Rhyme scheme: ABABCDCDEFEF
- Publication date: 1837; 1842; 1857
- Lines: 36

Full text
- St. Agnes' Eve (Tennyson) at Wikisource

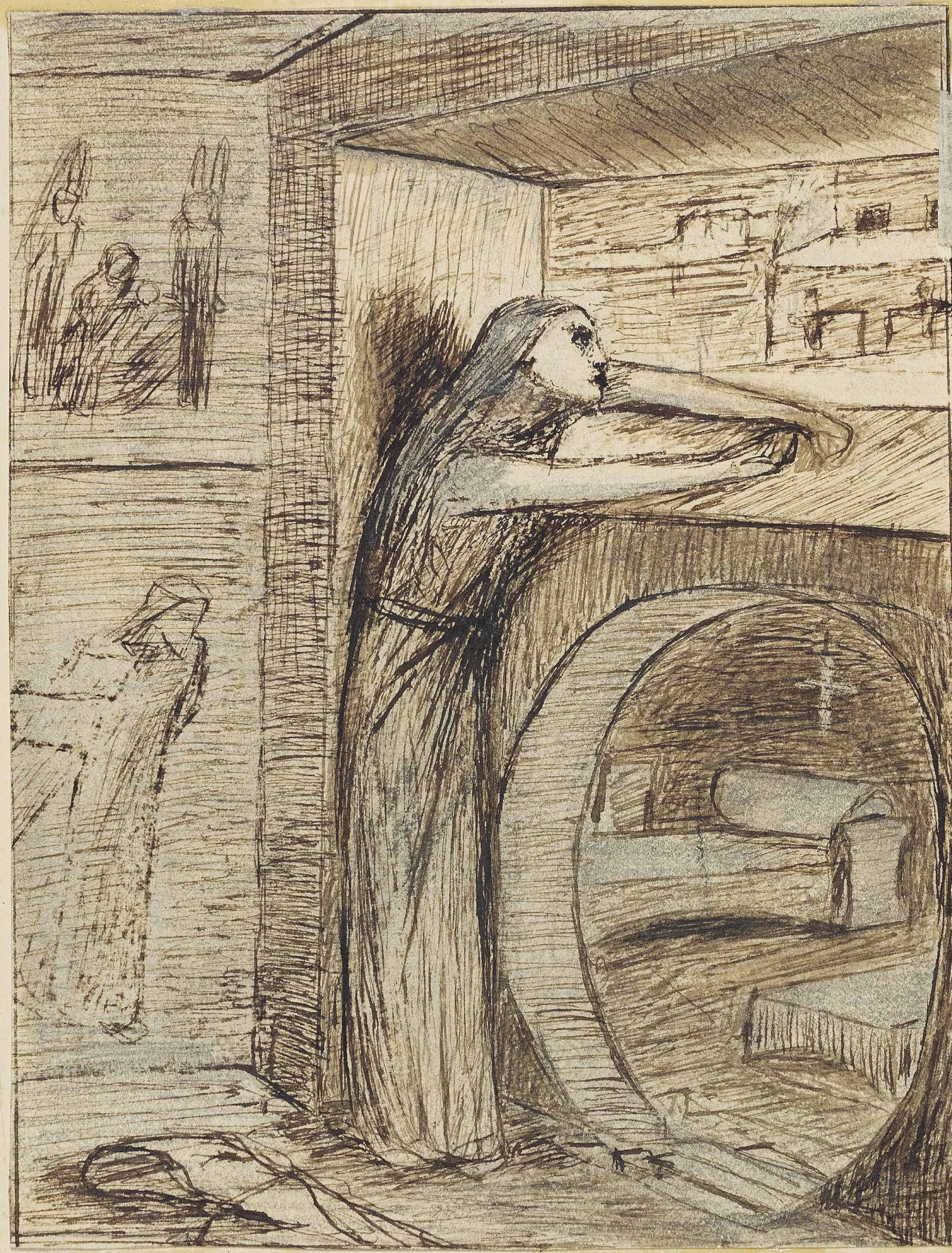
Pen and ink drawing by Elizabeth Siddal, inscribed "By Lizzie R / Tennyson's St Agnes Eve" on the reverse of the mount (c. 1855)

"St. Agnes" is a poem by Alfred Tennyson, first published in 1837, revised in 1842, and retitled "St. Agnes' Eve" in 1857.

== History ==
The poem was first published in 1837 in The Keepsake, an annual edited by Lady Emmeline Stuart Wortley, and was included in Poems (1842). No alteration was made in it after 1842.

In 1857 the title was altered from "St. Agnes" to "St. Agnes' Eve", thus bringing it near to Keats' poem, The Eve of St. Agnes, which certainly influenced Tennyson in writing it, as a comparison of the opening of the two poems will show.

Agnes of Rome, the saint from whom the poem takes its name, was a young girl of thirteen who suffered martyrdom in the reign of Diocletian: she is a companion to Sir Galahad.

== Text ==
Deep on the convent-roof the snows
Are sparkling to the moon:
My breath to heaven like vapour goes:
May my soul follow soon!
The shadows of the convent-towers
Slant down the snowy sward,
Still creeping with the creeping hours
That lead me to my Lord:
Make Thou (Note: In Keepsake: not capital in Thou.) my spirit pure and clear
As are the frosty skies,
Or this first snowdrop of the year
That in (Note: In Keepsake: On.) my bosom lies.

As these white robes are soiled and dark,
To yonder shining ground;
As this pale taper's earthly spark,
To yonder argent round;
So shows my soul before the Lamb,
My spirit before Thee;
So in mine earthly house I am,
To that I hope to be.
Break up the heavens, O Lord! and far,
Thro' all yon starlight keen,
Draw me, thy bride, a glittering star,
In raiment white and clean.

He lifts me to the golden doors;
The flashes come and go;
All heaven bursts her starry floors,
And strows (Note: In Keepsake: Strews.) her lights below,
And deepens on and up! the gates
Roll back, and far within
For me the Heavenly Bridegroom waits, (Note: In Keepsake: not capitals in Heavenly and Bridegroom.)
To make me pure of sin. (Note: In Keepsake: To wash me pure from sin.)
The sabbaths of Eternity,
One sabbath deep and wide—
A light upon the shining sea—
The Bridegroom (Note: In Keepsake: capital in Bridegroom.) with his bride!

== Bibliography ==
- Collins, John Churton, ed. (1900). The Early Poems of Alfred, Lord Tennyson. London: Methuen & Co. pp. 238–241.
- McLuhan, H. M., ed. "St. Agnes' Eve". RPO: Representative Poetry Online. University of Toronto Libraries. Retrieved 12 May 2022.
- Ringel, Meredith (21 December 2004). "The Theme of "The Eve of St. Agnes" in the Pre-Raphaelite Movement". The Victorian Web. Retrieved 12 May 2022.
- Tennyson, Hallam (1897). Alfred Lord Tennyson: A Memoir by his Son. Vol. 1. London: Macmillan and Co., Limited. pp. 142, 157, 420.
