= Solovetsky =

Solovetsky (masculine), Solovetskaya (feminine), Solovetskoye (neuter), or Solovetskiye (plural) may refer to:

- Solovetsky Islands, an island archipelago in the White Sea, Russia
  - Solovetsky District, the administrative division which this archipelago is incorporated as
  - Solovetsky Monastery, a museum located there
  - Bolshoy Solovetsky Island
- Solovetsky Bay
- Solovetsky (rural locality) (Solovetskaya, Solovetskoye), name of several rural localities in Russia
- Of Solovki (disambiguation)

== See also ==
- Solovetsky (disambiguation)
- Solovki (disambiguation)
