= Solovki =

Solovki may refer to one of the following places in Russia:

- Solovetsky Islands
- Solovki Airport, the airport serving the Solovetsky Islands
- Solovetsky Monastery on the islands
- Solovki prison camp, formerly on the islands
- Solovki (essay), a laudatory essay by Maksim Gorky about his visit to the Solovki camp

== See also ==
- Solovetsky (disambiguation)
- Of Solovki (disambiguation)
