= Bolshoy Solovetsky Island =

Island in the White Sea, Russia

Native name: Большой Соловецкий остров
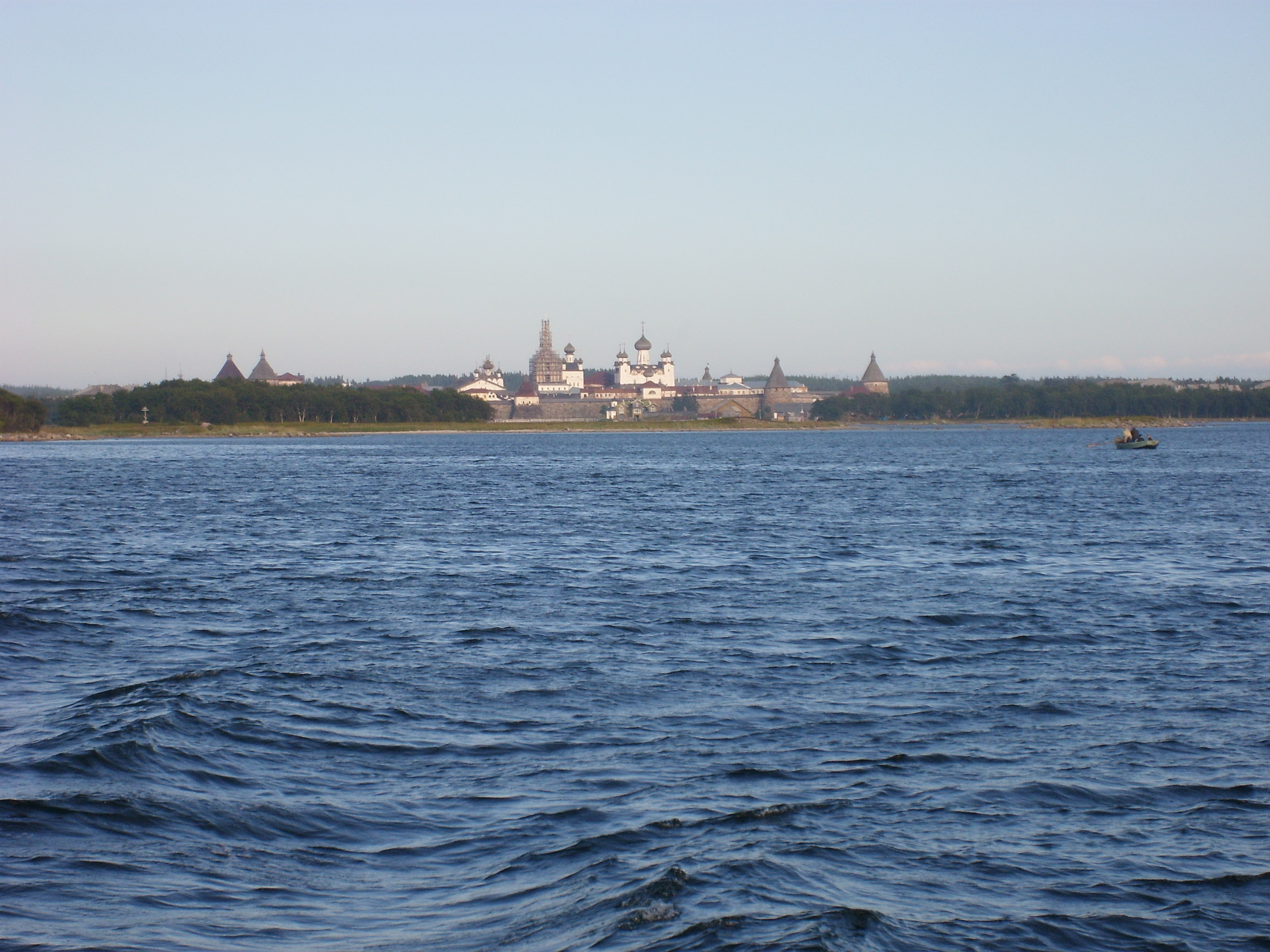
- Solovetsky Monastery seen from the sea
- Interactive map of Bolshoy Solovetsky Island

Geography
- Location: White Sea
- Coordinates: 65°06′N 35°41′E
- Archipelago: Solovetsky Islands
- Area: 246 km^{2} (95 sq mi)
- Highest elevation: 98.5 m (323.2 ft)
- Highest point: Sekirnaya Mountain

Administration
- Russia
- Oblast: Arkhangelsk Oblast

Bolshoy Solovetsky Island (Russian: Большой Соловецкий остров), or simply Solovetsky Island (Russian: Соловецкий остров) is the biggest island of the Solovetsky Islands archipelago in the White Sea, northern Russia. The island is home to Solovetsky Monastery, a medieval monastery and a fortress included in the World Heritage list.

== Location and geography ==
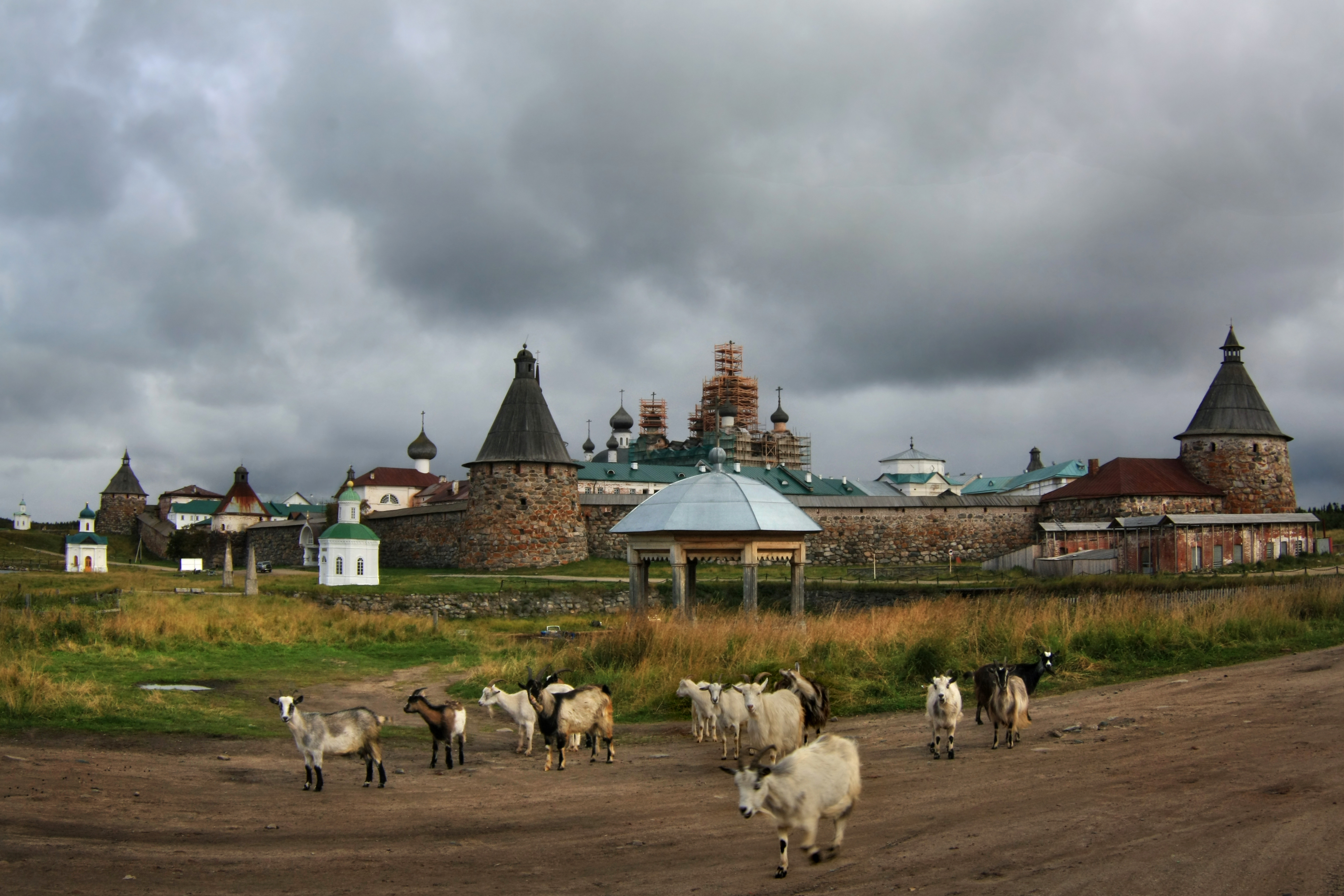
Goat herd in Solovetsky Islands, Russia

The island is located on the southwestern side of the archipelago. To the east of Solovetsky Island there are Anzersky Island and Bolshaya Muksalma Island. From the Bolshaya Muksalma side, a bay, Dolgaya Bay (Russian: Долгая Губа), several kilometers long, is connected by a narrow passage to the White Sea. Another bay in the north of the island is Sosnovaya Bay (Russian: Сосновая Губа). Solovetsky and Anzersky islands are separated by the Anzerskaya Salma strait, and Solovetsky and Bolshaya Muksalma islands are separated by two straits: Severnye Zheleznye Vorota and Yuzhnye Zheleznye Vorota (literally translated as Northern and Southern Iron Gates). Bolshoy Solovetsky and Bolshaya Muksalma Islands are connected by a dam built by the monks of the Solovetsky Monastery. There are many lakes on the island, the biggest of which is Lake Krasnoye. The area of the island is 246 square kilometres (95 mi^{2}), with the length and the width being 25 kilometres (16 mi) and 16 kilometres (9.9 mi), respectively. The highest point of the island is Sekirnaya Mountain (Russian: Секирная гора), 98.5 metres (323 ft) high.ost of the island is covered by coniferous forest.

The only inhabited locality on the island is the settlement of Solovetsky, which serves as the administrative center of Solovetsky District and of Solovetskoye Rural Settlement of Primorsky Municipal District of Arkhangelsk Oblast. The population of Solovetsky is about 1,000 inhabitants. The monastery is located in the settlement, on the western side of the island. In addition, there are a number of sketes, used by the monks, and several tonyas, seasonal houses on the shore, which are not used and belong to the museum.

== History ==
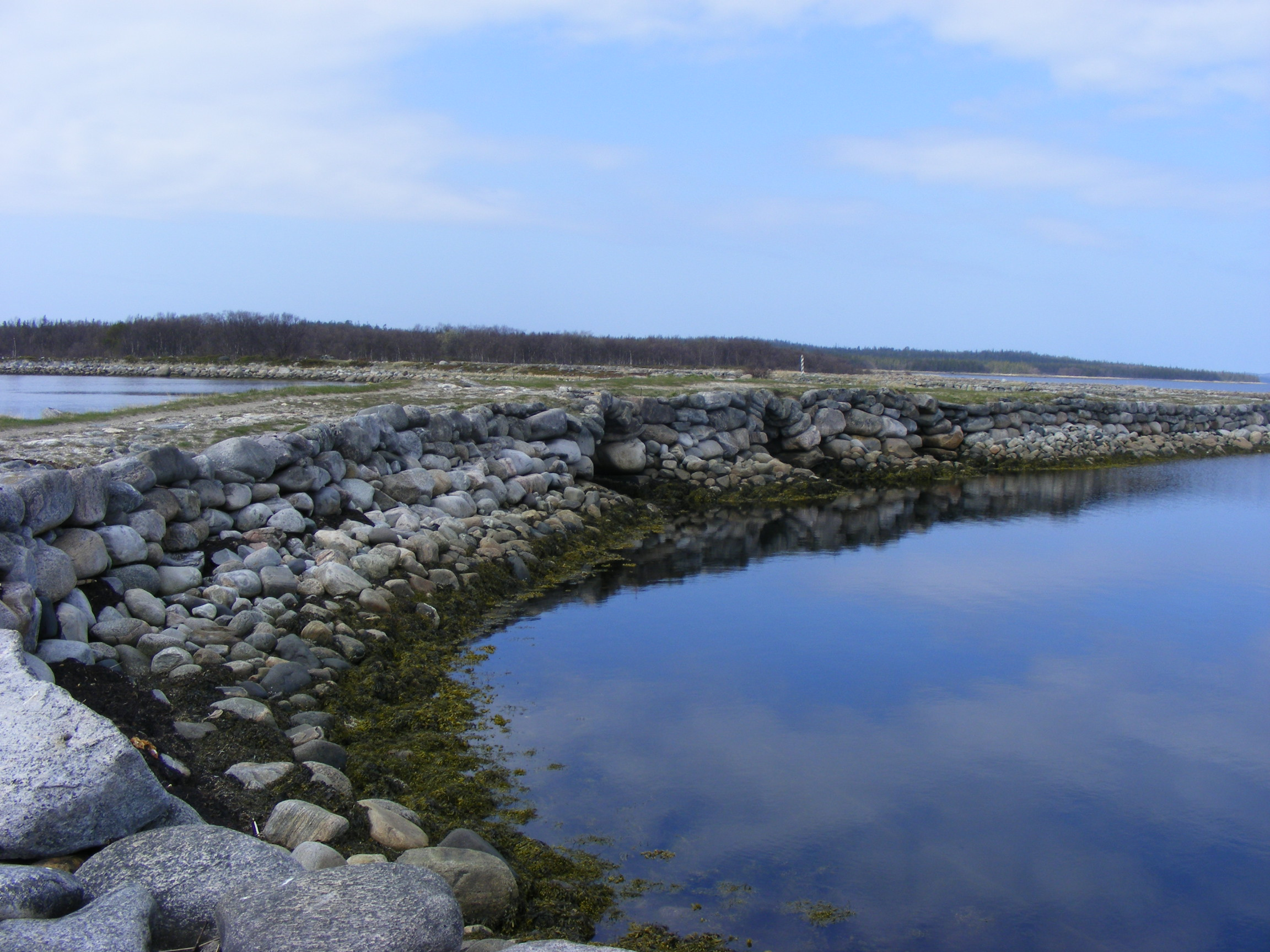
A dam between Bolshoy Solovetsky and Bolshaya Muksalma islands.

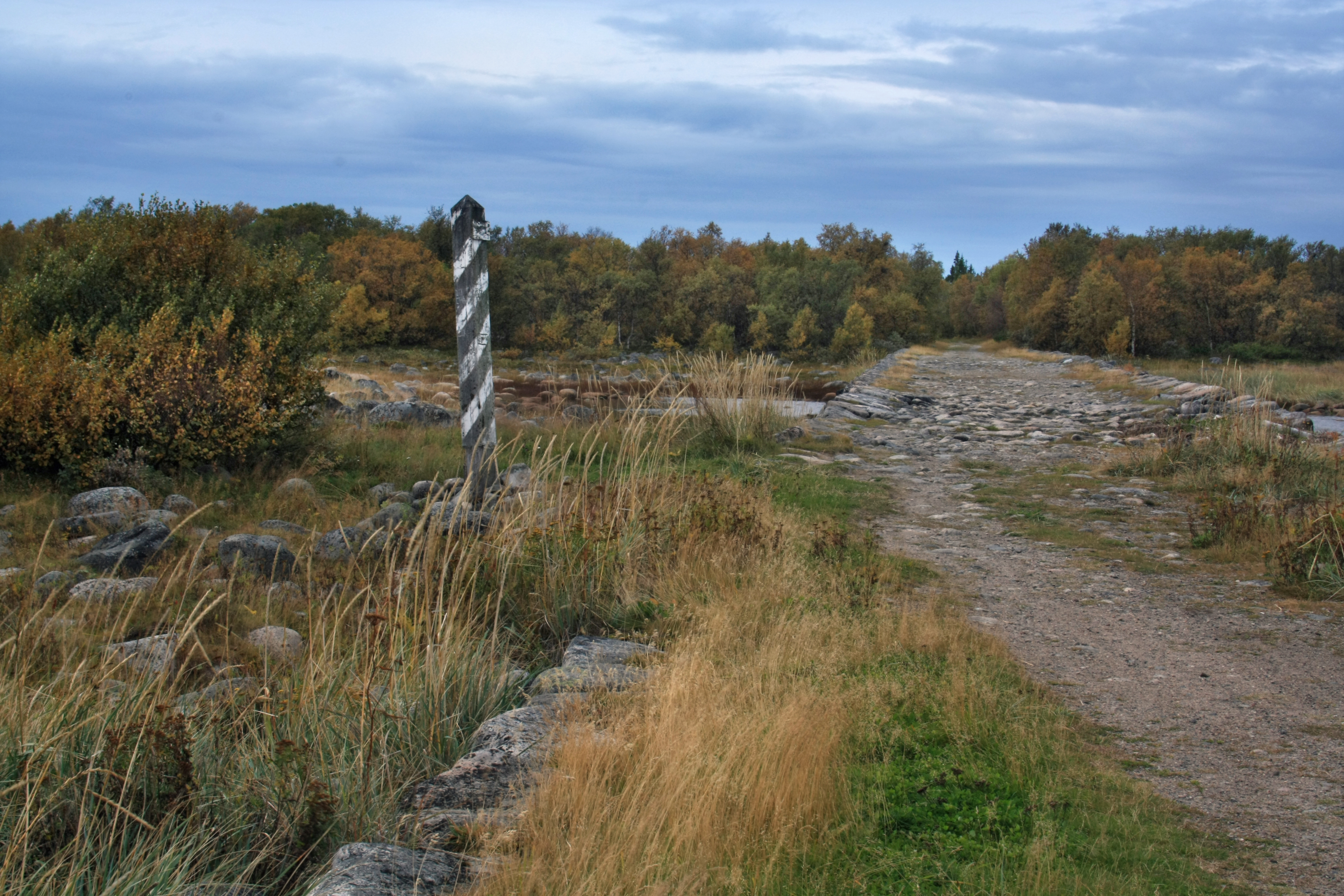
Beginning of the dam from the Solovetsky Islands.

Solovetsky Island were visited by Pomor fishermen and hunters on a regular basis at least in the 14th century. In 1429, the monks Savvatiy and German (Herman) arrived to the islands in the search of remote places. Savvatiy died in 1435, and German left and eventually returned to the island in 1436 with Zosima, who founded the monastery. Solovetsky Monastery soon became one of the most prosperous monasteries in Russia and owned extensive lands. From 1548 till 1565, its hegumen was Filipp Kolychev, the future Metropolitan of Moscow. In the end of the 17th century, the monastery refused to accept the reforms of Russian Orthodox Church, introduced by Patriarch Nikon, a former monk of the monastery, and after the seven-year-long siege (Solovetsky Monastery Uprising) it was seized by the government forces, and most of the insurgents were executed. In 1920, the monastery was abolished, and its buildings turned into a prison camp. The prison was closed in 1939 because the Second World War was imminent, and the camp was situated close to the border with Finland. The buildings were then transformed into a naval base. The navy cadet corps was deployed in the monastery buildings, one of the notable cadets was the future author Valentin Pikul. In 1965, the islands were transferred to the future museum to be open at the premises of the monastery, and the general public was for the first time allowed to the islands. The museum was open in 1967. In 1992, the Russian Orthodox Church reestablished the monastery. In the same year the ensemble was included into UNESCO's World Heritage List.

The monastery, being the only land-owner on the island during the whole period of its existence before 1920, took care of the civil construction. In particular, the monks built the dam to the Bolshaya Muksalma Island, all of the roads, and the canals connecting some of the lakes between themselves and with the sea.

== Economy and transport ==
Currently, tourism is the main source of income of the civil population of the island.

The island is served by the Solovki Airport and connected by regular passenger service to Arkhangelsk. There is also regular passenger sea connections (only in summer) to Arkhangelsk, Kem, and Belomorsk.
