= Solovetsky (rural locality) =

Name of several Russian rural localities

Solovetsky (Russian: Соловецкий; masculine), Solovetskaya (Соловецкая; feminine), or Solovetskoye (Соловецкое; neuter) is the name of several rural localities in Russia:

- Solovetsky, Arkhangelsk Oblast, a settlement in Solovetsky District of Arkhangelsk Oblast
- Solovetsky, Oryol Oblast, a settlement in Nepolodsky Selsoviet of Orlovsky District of Oryol Oblast
- Solovetskoye, Orlovsky District, Kirov Oblast, a selo in Podgorodny Rural Okrug of Orlovsky District of Kirov Oblast
- Solovetskoye, Shabalinsky District, Kirov Oblast, a selo in Novotroitsky Rural Okrug of Shabalinsky District of Kirov Oblast
- Solovetskoye, Kostroma Oblast, a selo in Solovetskoye Settlement of Oktyabrsky District of Kostroma Oblast
- Solovetskoye, Omsk Oblast, a selo in Solovetsky Rural Okrug of Nizhneomsky District of Omsk Oblast
