= Bolshaya Muksalma =

Coordinates: 65°2′15″N 35°57′5″E

Native name: Большая Муксалма
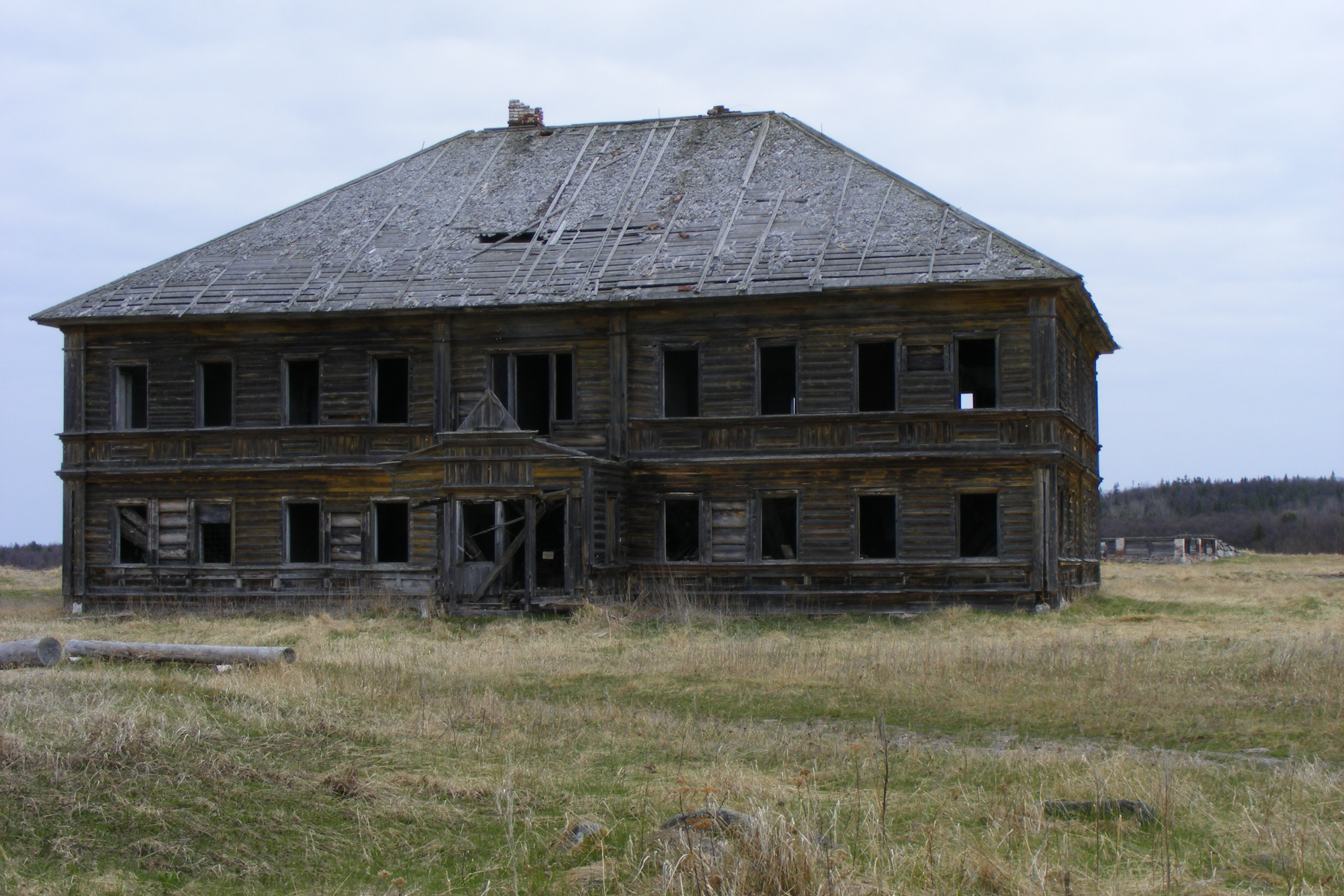
- Sergeyev Skete at Bolshaya Muksalma
- Interactive map of Bolshaya Muksalma

Geography
- Location: White Sea
- Archipelago: Solovetsky Islands
- Area: 17 km^{2} (6.6 sq mi)

Administration
- Russia
- Oblast: Arkhangelsk Oblast

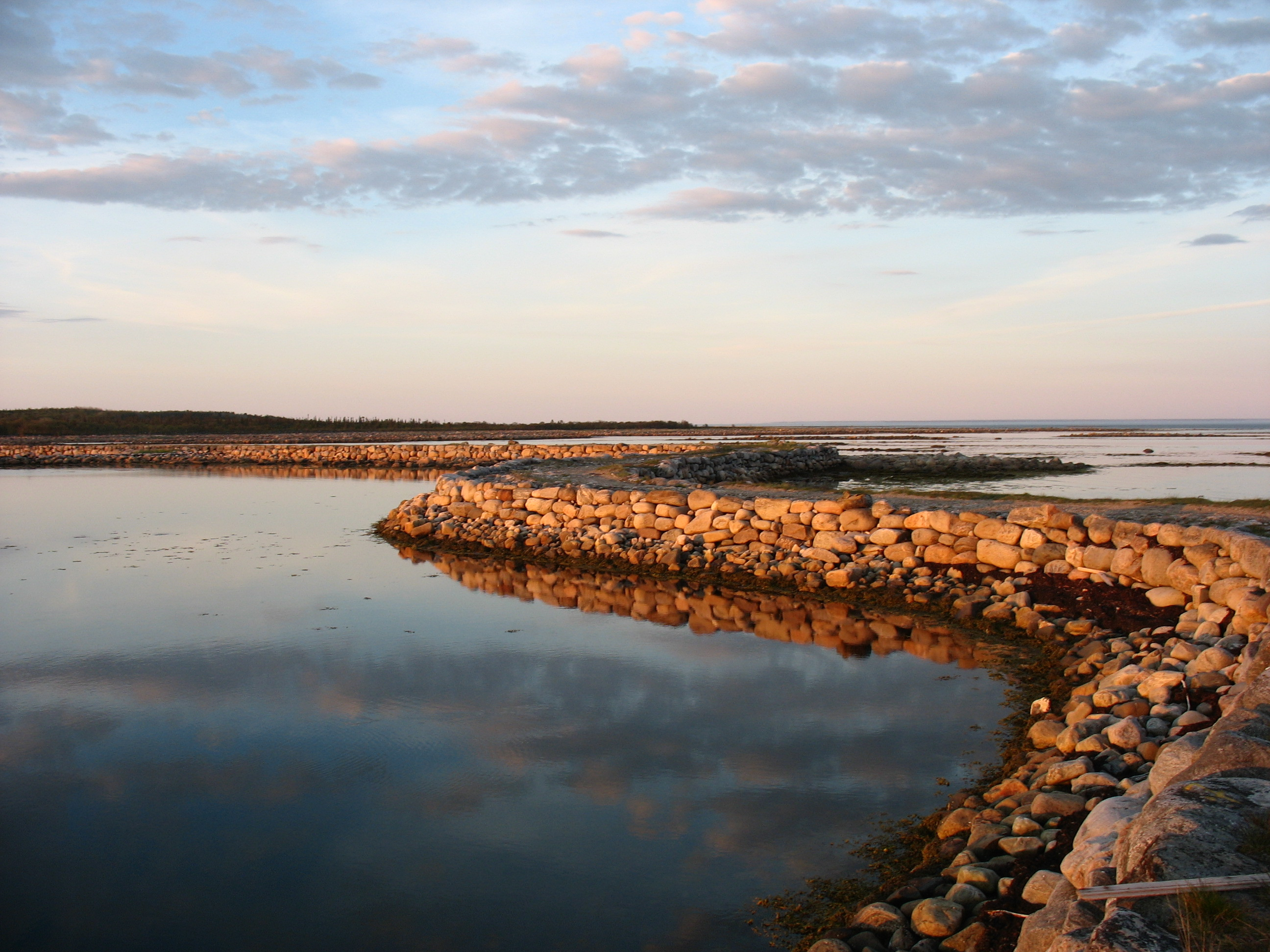
Dam to Bolshaya Muksalma

Bolshaya Muksalma (Russian: Больша́я Му́ксалма) is one of the Solovetsky Islands. Bolshaya Muksalma is situated to the east of Bolshoy Solovetsky Island and is separated from it by two straits: Severnye Zheleznye Vorota and Yuzhnye Zheleznye Vorota (literally translated as Northern and Southern Iron Gates). The Yuzhnye Zheleznye Vorota Strait is crossed by a dam which was built by the monks of Solovetsky Monastery between 1865 and 1871 and now connects the two islands. The dam is several hundred meters long and 6.5 metres (21 ft) wide. Southeast of Bolshaya Muksalma, there is Malaya Muksalma Island, as well as a number of tiny islets. The area of Bolshaya Muksalma is 17 square kilometres (6.6 mi^{2}). In terms of the area, this is the third island of the archipelago behind Bolzhoy Solovetsky and Anzersky Islands.

There is archaeological evidence that the island was populated in the second millennium BC. In historical time, Bolshaya Muksalma was made the location of the farm serving Solovetsky Monastery, as keeping female animals near the monastery was prohibited. In the 19th century there was a small and secluded monastery (Sergeyev skete) on the island, which ran the monastery farm. In the 1900s, two cell buildings were constructed: in 1900, the wooden St. Sergius cells, and in 1901–1905, a stone building which combined cells with some agricultural facilities. In 1920, the monastery was shut down, and the skete later served as a department of the Solovetsky Gulag camp where women prisoners were confined. In 1939, the prison camp was shut down. Currently, there is algae production run on the island.
