= Bolshoy Zayatsky Island =

Island in Russia

Coordinates: 64°58′15″N 35°40′25″E

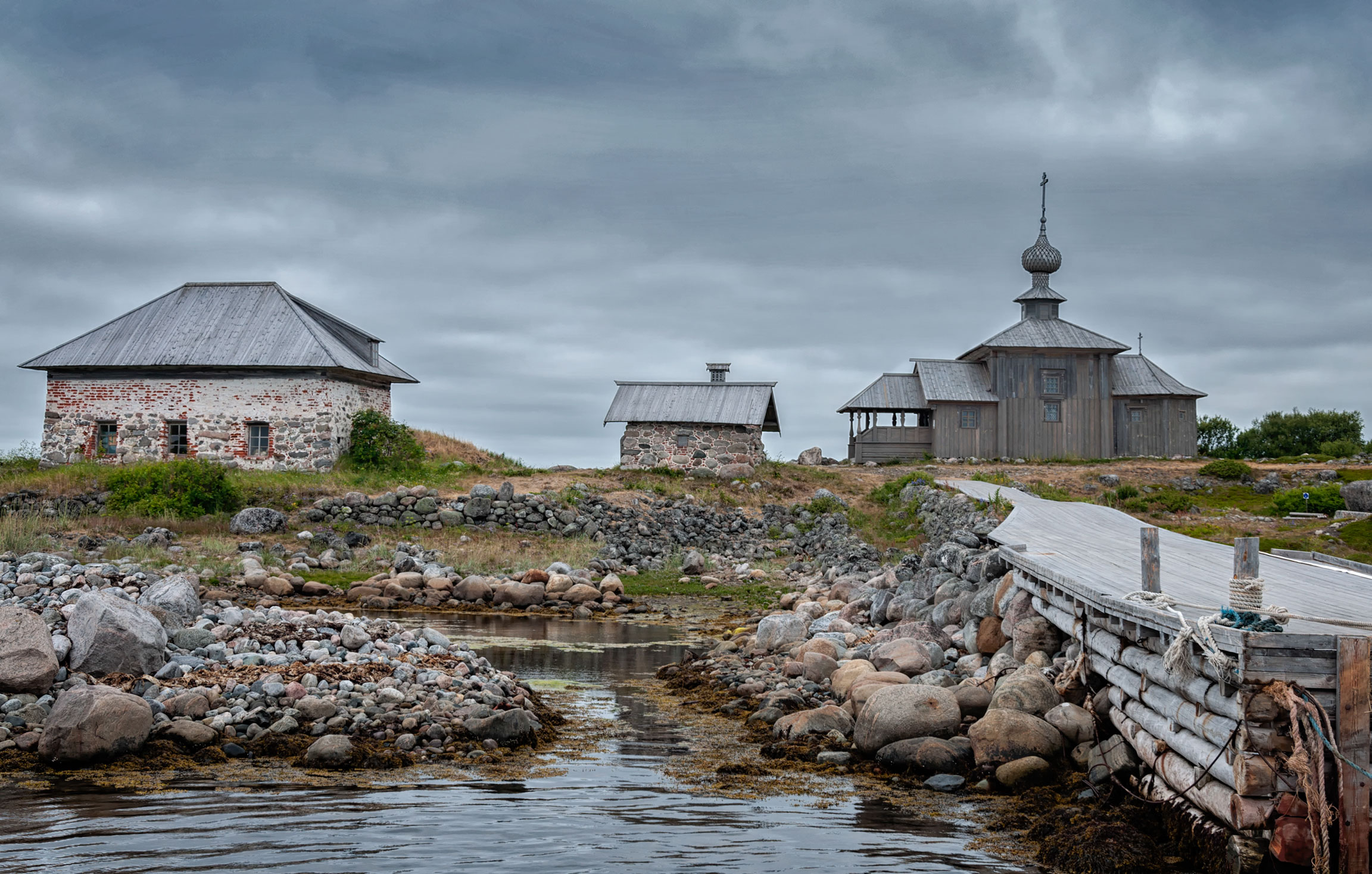
View of St. Andrew hermitage

Bolshoy Zayatsky Island (Russian: Большой Заяцкий Остров (Great Hare Island)) is an island in the White Sea. It is one of six major islands comprising the Solovetsky archipelago. The island is famous for its history and nature. In prehistoric times, the island was used as a sanctuary by the indigenous coastal population. In the mid-16th century monks of the Solovetsky monastery organized a transit port on this island that later grew into the St. Andrew hermitage. Nowadays, the island is a protected territory with historical memorials of various periods. Since 1992 it has been listed as a UNESCO World Heritage Site as a part of the Solovetsky monastery complex.

== Geography ==
Bolshoy Zayatsky island is located 2 km southwest from the central island of the archipelago. Its surface is 1.25 square kilometres (0.48 sq mi). Just like other islands of this region, it was formed approximately 9000 years ago by a retreating glacier. The island has typical features of tundra landscape, however it is located outside of permafrost zone. There are two small hills on either side of the island, each roughly 30 meters high.

== Archaeological site ==
Group of stone mounds

There are a significant number of man-made stone constructions, most notably labyrinths and stone mounds. These labyrinths are not unique to Bolshoy Zayatsky Island and can also be found on other islands of the Solovetsky archipelago. There are 35 labyrinths on the Solovetsky archipelago and 13-14 of them are located on Bolshoy Zayatsky Island alongside more than 600 stone mounds which suggests a particular significance of this place for a prehistoric population.

Labyrinths are spiral structures made of stone (however with time they became covered with vegetation) from 10 to 25 meters in diameter. There were various hypotheses about the time and purpose of their construction. Most researchers connect them with the religious beliefs of the ancient population of the White Sea region.

A widely spread version regarded Zayatsky island as a burial site, however, excavation of one of the labyrinths in early 1930s as well as the dismantling of several mounds in the 1980s did not provide any results to prove such a claim. Another theory regarded the labyrinths as built to mark the entrance to the Saiva – the land of dead in Sámi mythology.

According to the latest hypothesis, only two labyrinths are estimated to be around 2000 years old while the other seven were constructed in the late medieval period preceding the foundation of the monastery.

== History ==
=== 16–19th centuries ===
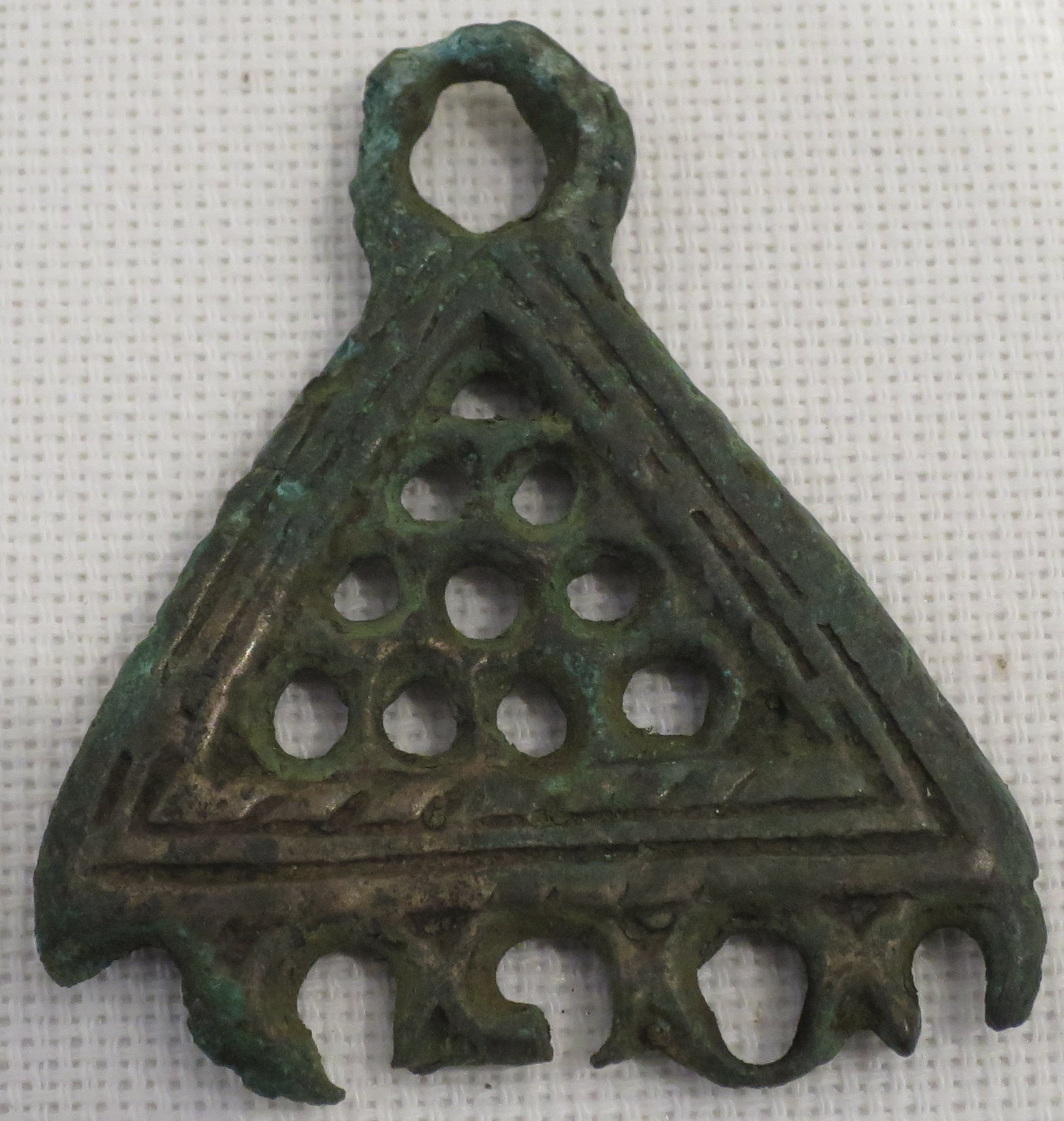
Bronze adornment of the Chud people, 11th-13th century AD. Solovetsky Monastery

After the foundation of the Solovetsky monastery the strait between Bolshoy and Maly Zayatsky islands was used by seafarers that waited for a fair wind to enter Prosperity Bay on the main island. In the mid-16th century, abbot Philip (Kolychev) ordered the building of a stone harbor to provide shelter for pilgrim and merchant boats. It was the first and, for more than 150 years, the only stone harbor in Russia.

In the same period, a dwelling house and a cook house were erected near the harbor. In 1691 a small wooden chapel was brought to the Bolshoy Zayatsky island from the Bolshoy Solovetsky island.

In 1702 the Solovetsky monastery was visited by Peter the Great who at that time was leading a war against Sweden for control over the Baltic Sea. During his 10-day visit he ordered the rebuilding of the chapel into a church and its consecration in the name of the Apostle Andrew. According to a legend the St. Andrew’s flag had been consecrated here before Peter set off for Karelian shore.

The St. Andrew church is now the second oldest wooden building on the Solovetsky archipelago. Its appearance combines wooden architecture traditions of Northern and Central Russia.

While Peter was on the Solovetsky islands thousands of peasants were building a road through the Karelian forest. When the road was finished Peter the Great led his troops to Onega and then Ladoga lake. In 1702 and 1703 he captured two important Swedish fortresses of Neva River (Nöteborg and Nyenskans) and founded Peter and Paul fortress that gave birth to the city of St. Petersburg.

In 1854 after an unsuccessful bombardment of the monastery English sailors landed on Bolshoy Zayatsky island to replenish supplies of water and food. During one of these landings they plundered the church taking several bells and other church items as souvenirs. In 1912 on the eve of the First World War the bells were returned to the monastery with excuses by an English delegation.

=== 20th century ===
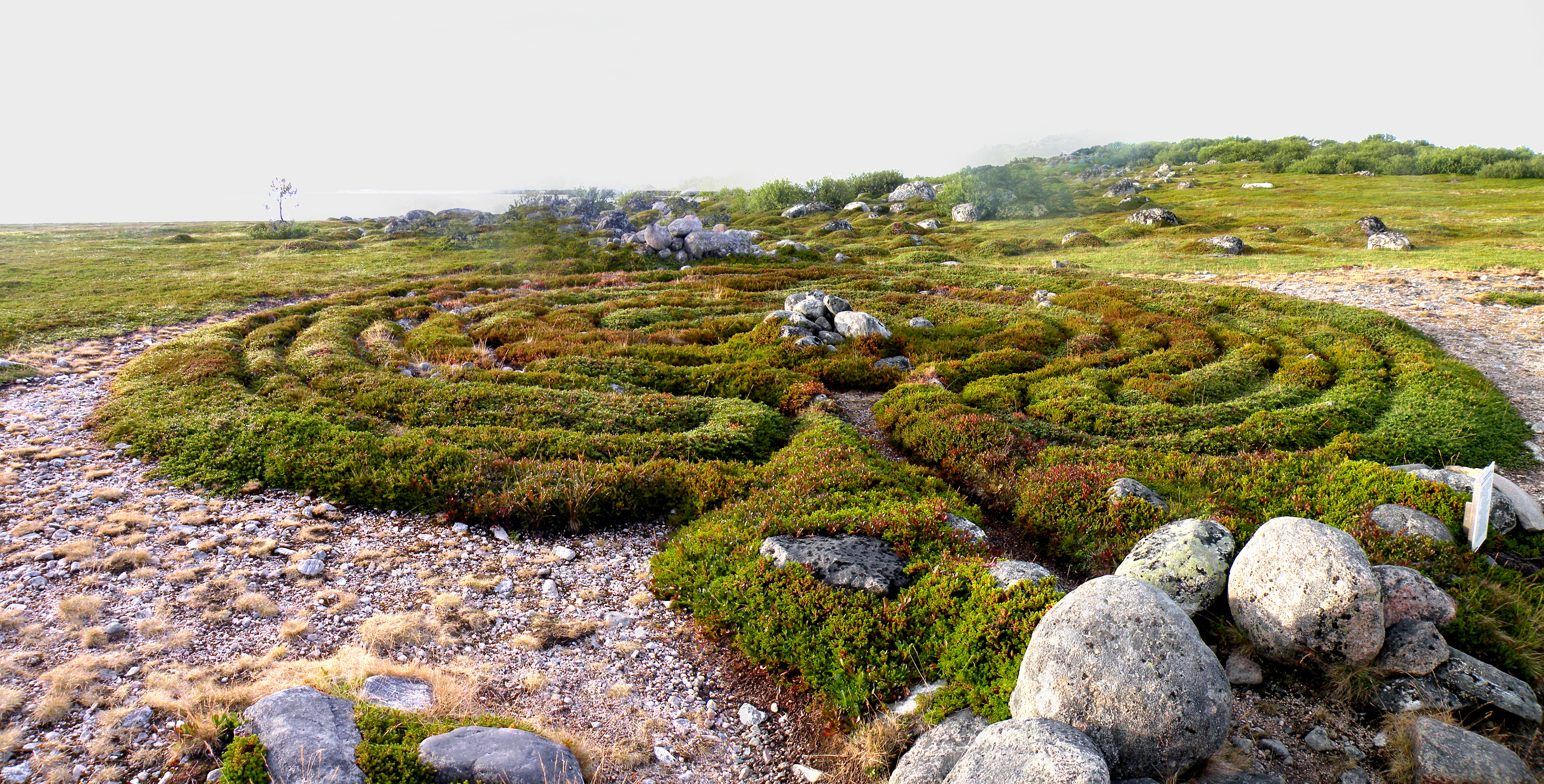
One of the Stone labyrinths of Bolshoi Zayatsky Island, 2013

In 1920 Bolsheviks reached the Solovetsky islands and closed the monastery with all its hermitages. Since 1923 Bolshoy Zayatsky island became a part of Solovetsky camp of special purpose. The island was used as a penalty prison for women, however information about this period is scarce.

From 1922 until 1939 (closure of the camp), the St. Andrew church was a reserve protected by the state. For almost 50 years after the closure of the camp, the buildings of the hermitage were misused or neglected. Conservation and restoration works started only in the early 1990s. At present, most of the restoration works have ceased. The interior of the church was recreated by the Solovetsky monastery and a new iconostasis was placed there in 2015. The island doesn’t have a permanent population, but during the tourist season, two keepers (one from the museum and one from the monastery) take residence there.

== See also ==
- Solovetsky islands
- Solovetsky monastery
- Solovetsky camp of special purpose
