= Stone labyrinths of Bolshoi Zayatsky Island =

Coordinates: 64.97050°N 35.66480°E

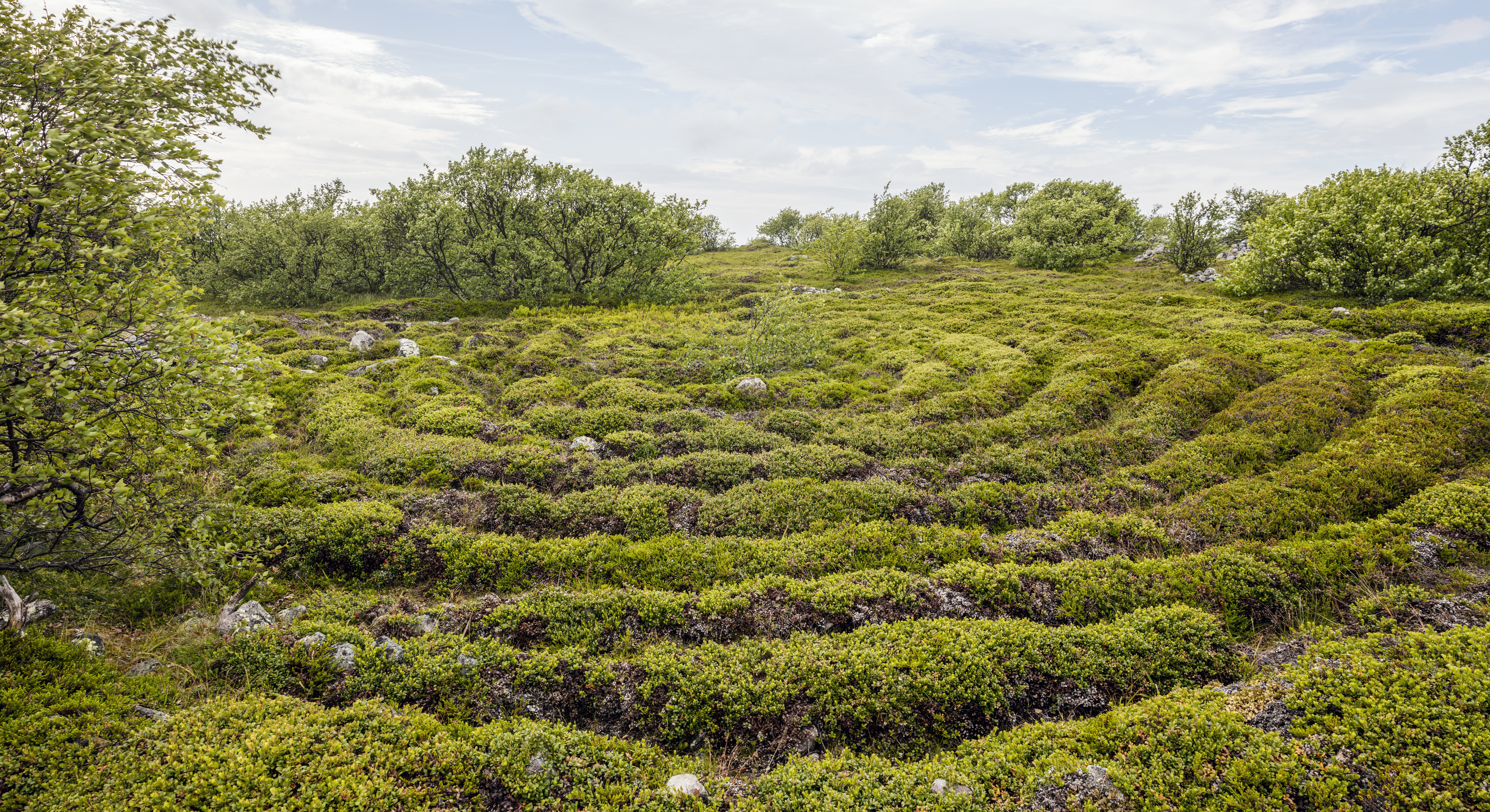
Section of one of the larger stone labyrinths on Bolshoi Zayatsky Island

The stone labyrinths of Bolshoi Zayatsky Island are a group of 13 or 14 labyrinths on Bolshoy Zayatsky Island, one of the Solovetsky Islands in Arkhangelsk Oblast, Russia. All the labyrinths are concentrated in an area of 0.4 km^{2} on the western part of the island. They differ from other similar structures in Fennoscandia and the Russian North by being concentrated in a small area. About 500 such structures have been described in Sweden and Finland. See Troy Town for details.

All in all, there are 35 labyrinths (known as vavilons – "Babylons" – in the local dialect) in the Solovetsky Islands. All have been made of local boulders.

== Description ==
Measuring between 6–25.4 m (20–83 ft) in diameter, the labyrinths on Bolshoi Zayatsky Island are mostly made of boulders (c.30–40 cm (12–16 in) in diameter) set in a row. The rows are twisted in the form of a spiral; often there are two spirals set one into another, which has been likened to "two serpents with their heads in the middle looking at each other". Intermittently along the spiral there are thicker or wider heaps of stones; the ends of the spirals are also wider. The entrances are generally on the southern sides of the labyrinths, but can also be found in the south-western, eastern or western parts. The labyrinths have five types of settings, but each has only one entrance which also serves as an exit. Excavations in the stone heaps have yielded parts of bones.

The vast majority of coastal stone labyrinths in Northern Europe date to the Middle Ages. In 2006, a research group from Saint Petersburg, lacking standard archaeological study, theorized that the Bolshoi Zayatsky labyrinths are about 2500 years old, according to their orientation, their supposed ritual use, and changes in the direction of the zenith on the solstice throughout history.

Apart from the labyrinths, there are more than 850 heaps of boulders on Bolshoi Zayatsky Island, plus numerous other stone settings such as a stone symbol with radial spokes, possibly representing the sun. An enormous pile of stones on Sopka Hill, in the eastern part of the island, does not include any labyrinths.

The function of the stone settings is unclear. One suggestion is that they may have symbolised a border between this world and the underworld and the labyrinth may have been used for specific rituals to help the souls of the dead travel to another world. Another hypothesis is that the settings may have served as a model for complex fishing equipment.

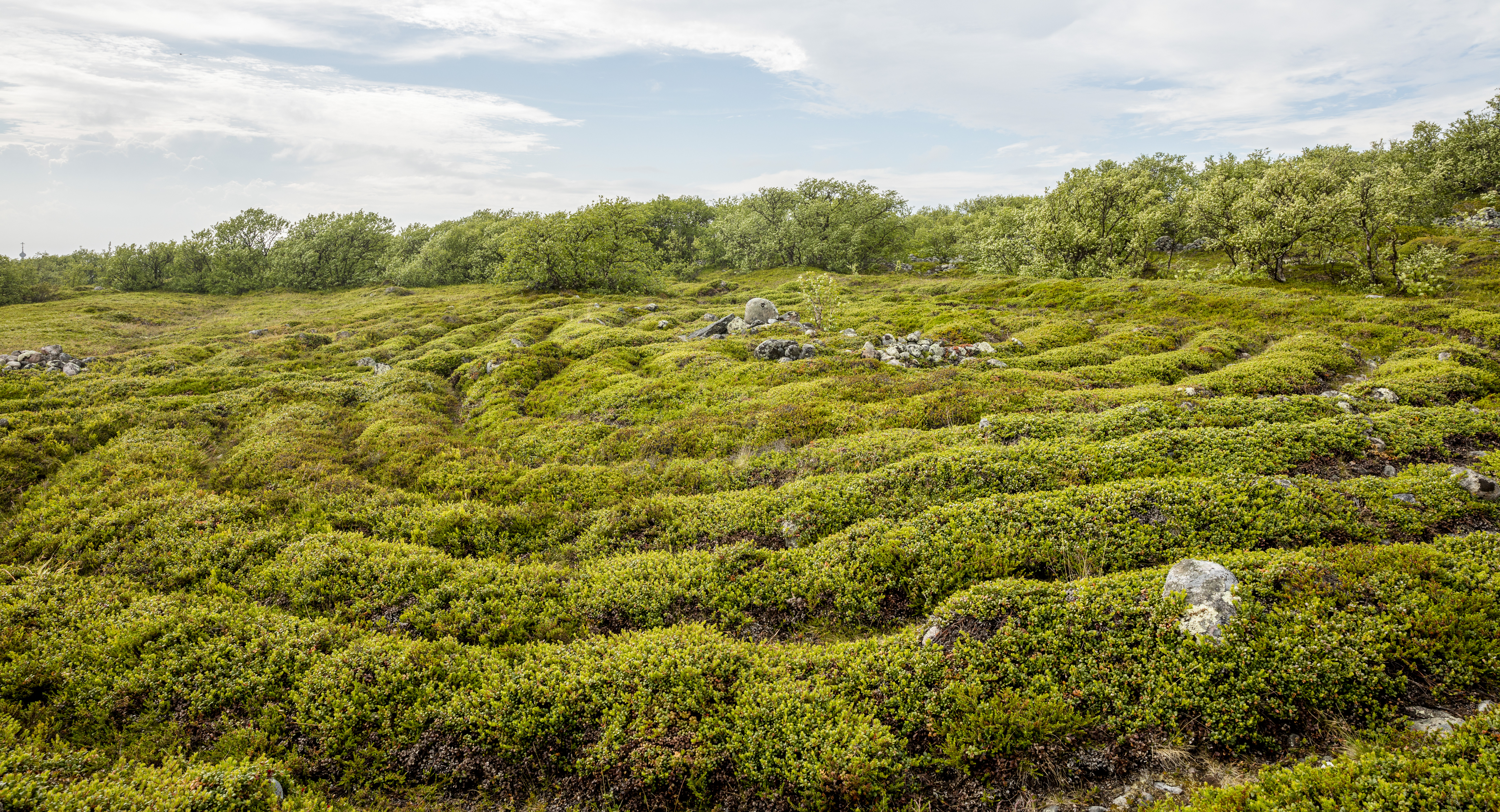

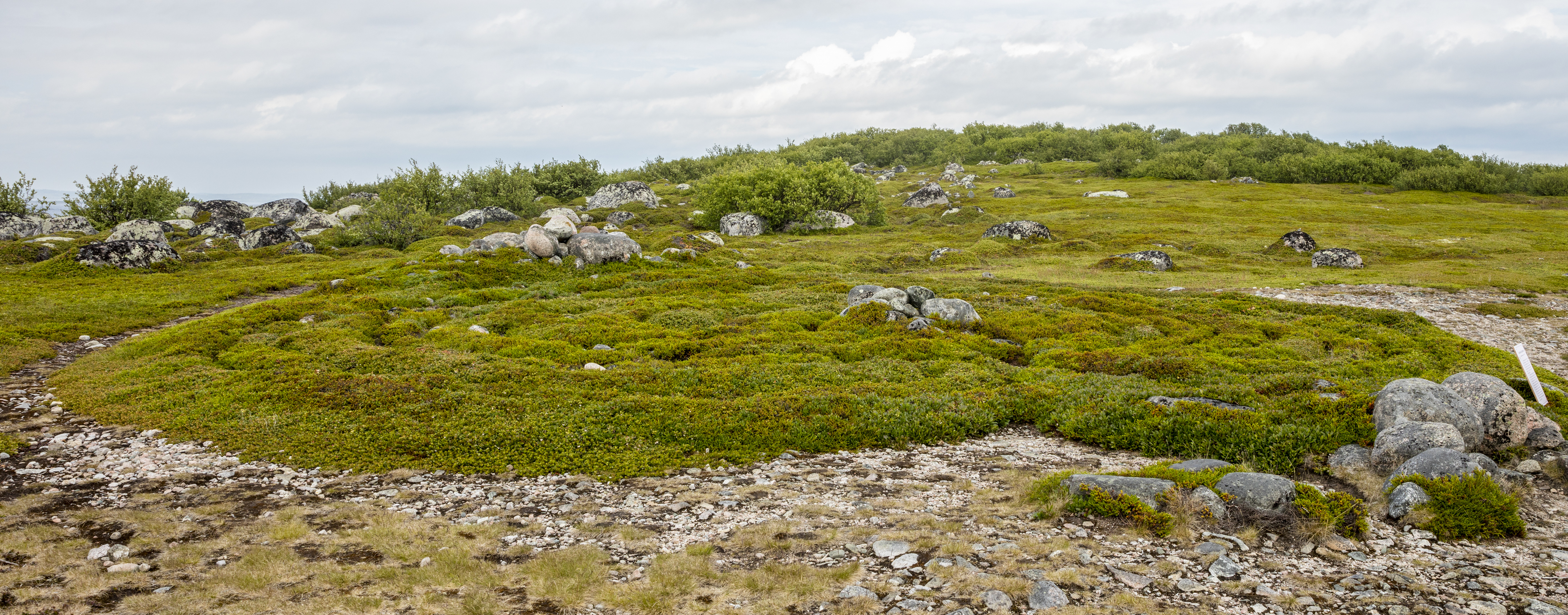

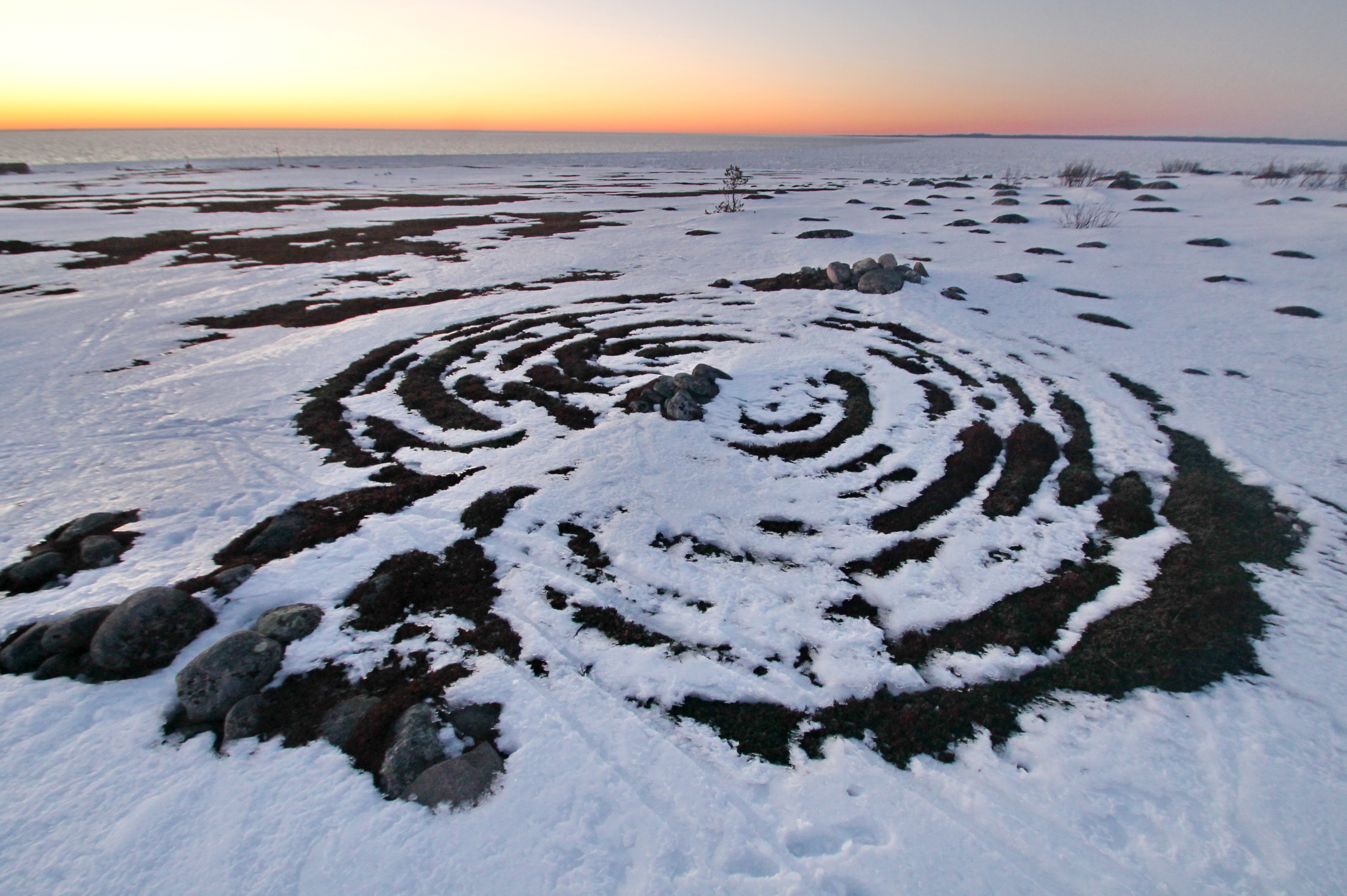

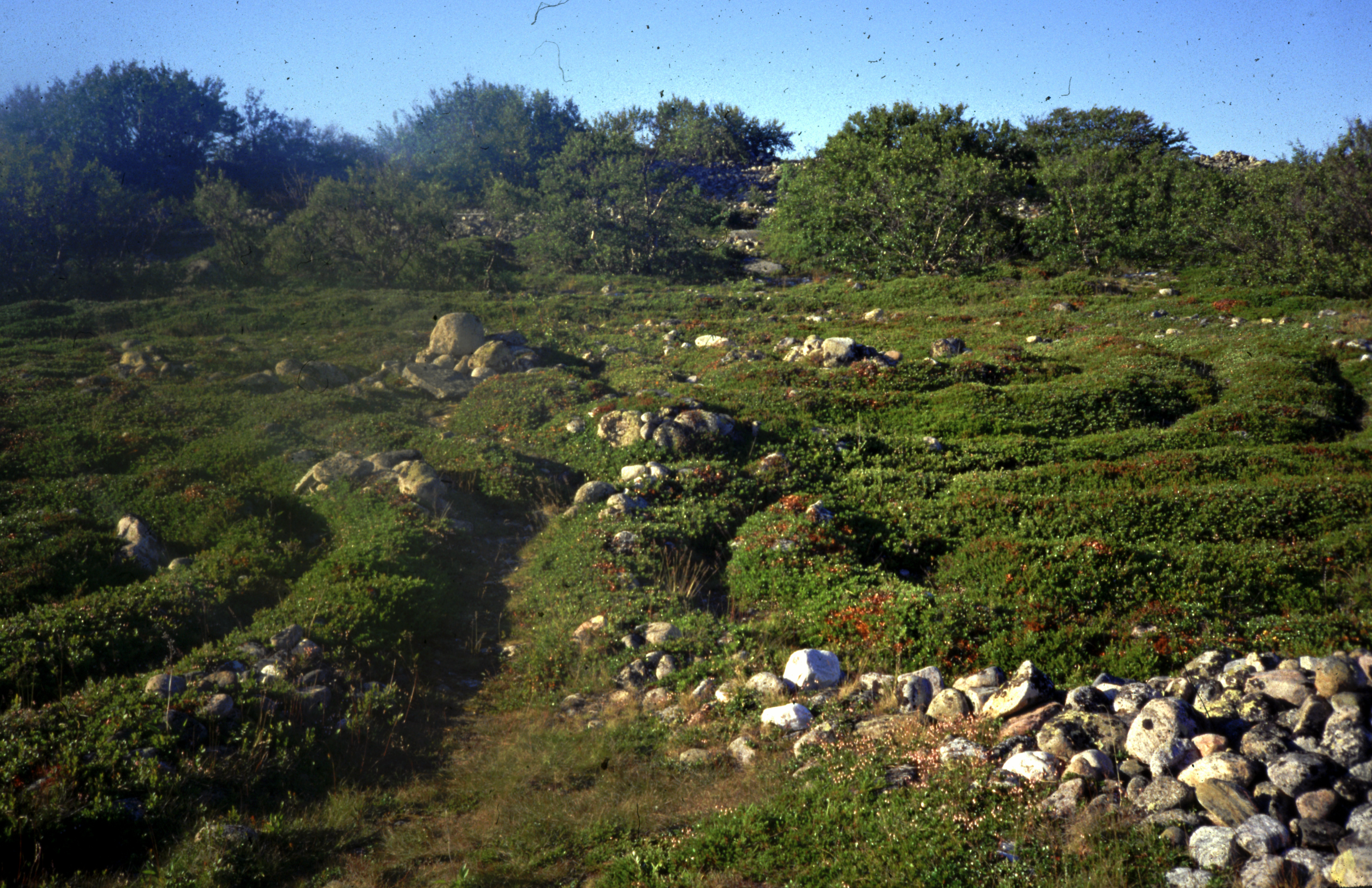

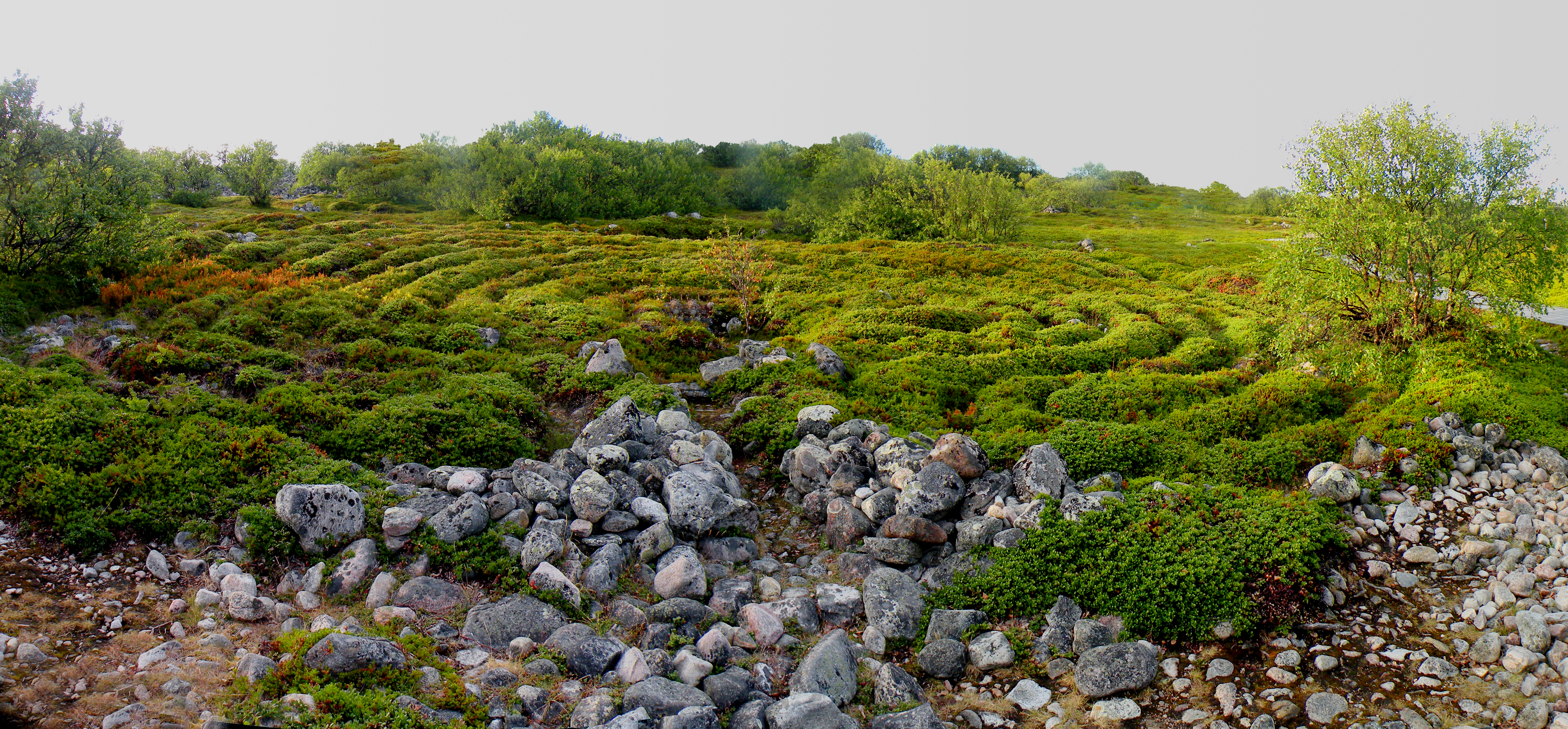

== See also ==
- Troy Town
- Blockula
