= Of Solovki =

Toponymic epithet related to the Solovetsky Monastery

of Solovki or Solovetsky (Russian: Соловецкий) is a toponymic epithet of several Russian saints and monks, a reference to the Solovetsky Monastery. Notable persons with this byname include:

- Dosifey of Solovki (died after 1514), hegumen of the Solovetsky Monastery, hagiographer
- Herman of Solovki
- Irenarch of Solovki (died 1628), hegumen of the Solovetsky Monastery
- Sabbatius of Solovki
- Zosimas of Solovki

== See also ==
- Solovetsky (disambiguation)
- Solovki (disambiguation)
