= Solovetsky, Arkhangelsk Oblast =

Rural locality in Solovetsky District, Arkhangelsk Oblast, Russia

Solovetsky Соловецкий
- Settlement
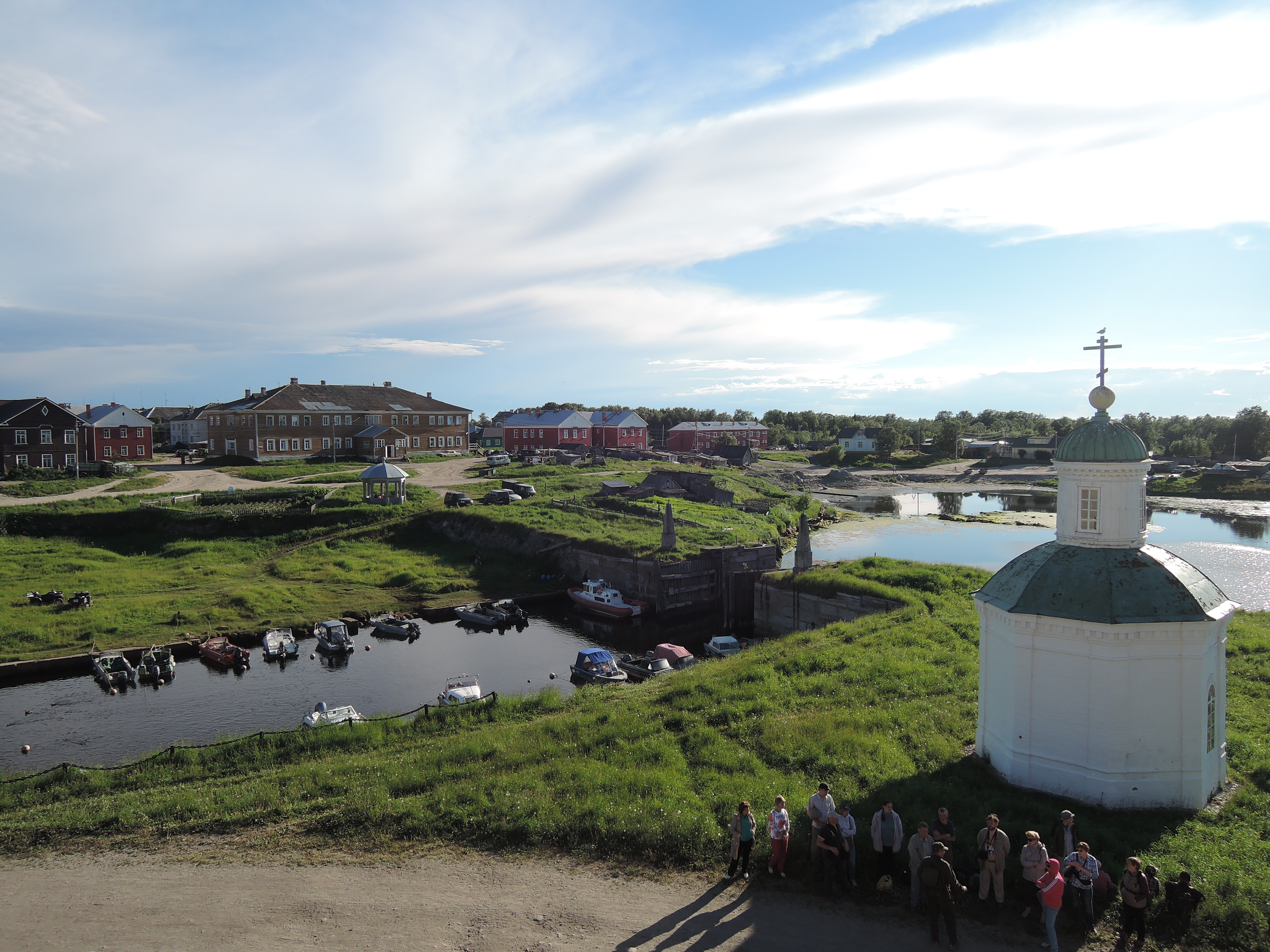
- View from Pradilnaya tower of the monastery
- Interactive map of Solovetsky
- Location of Solovetsky Solovetsky (Arkhangelsk Oblast)
- Coordinates: 65°02′N 35°43′E
- Country: Russia
- Federal subject: Arkhangelsk Oblast
- Administrative district: Solovetsky District
- Founded: 1965

Population (2010 Census)
  - Total: 840
  - Estimate (2021): 808 (−3.8%)

Administrative status
  - Capital of: Solovetsky District

Municipal status
  - Municipal district: Primorsky Municipal District
  - Rural settlement: Solovetskoye Rural Settlement
  - Capital of: Solovetskoye Rural Settlement
- Time zone: UTC+3 (MSK)
- Postal code: 164070
- OKTMO ID: 11652458101

Solovetsky (Russian: Солове́цкий) is a rural locality (a settlement) and the administrative center of Solovetsky District in Arkhangelsk Oblast, Russia, located on the west coast of Bolshoy Solovetsky Island in the White Sea. Municipally, it is the administrative center of Solovetskoye Rural Settlement of Primorsky District. As of the 2010 Census, its population was 840.

== History ==
From 1435, when Solovetsky Monastery was founded, and until 1920, when it was abolished, the islands were the property of the monastery, and the economy was run by the monks. In 1920, the Solovki prison camp was established in the former monastery buildings, and again there was no access to the islands, except for the prisoners and the correction department officers. In 1939, the prison camp was closed due to the imminent war with Finland. The navy cadet corps was deployed in the monastery buildings; one of the notable cadets was the future author Valentin Pikul. In 1965, the islands were transferred to the museum to be open, and for the first time were open for public, which is when the modern settlement was founded. The Solovki Museum was officially established in 1967. The settlement was needed for civil population, mostly engaged in the museum activities. In 1992, the monastery was reopened, and some of the properties were transferred to the monastery, but some still belong to the museum. In the same year, the monastery was included in the World Heritage list.

== Demographics ==
Solovetsky population
- 2010 Census: 840
- 2002 Census: 955
- 1989 Census: 1,303

The settlement is home to almost all of the population of Solovetsky District; in 2010, for example, the population of the district was 861, of which 840 (97.6%) lived in the settlement.

== Economy ==
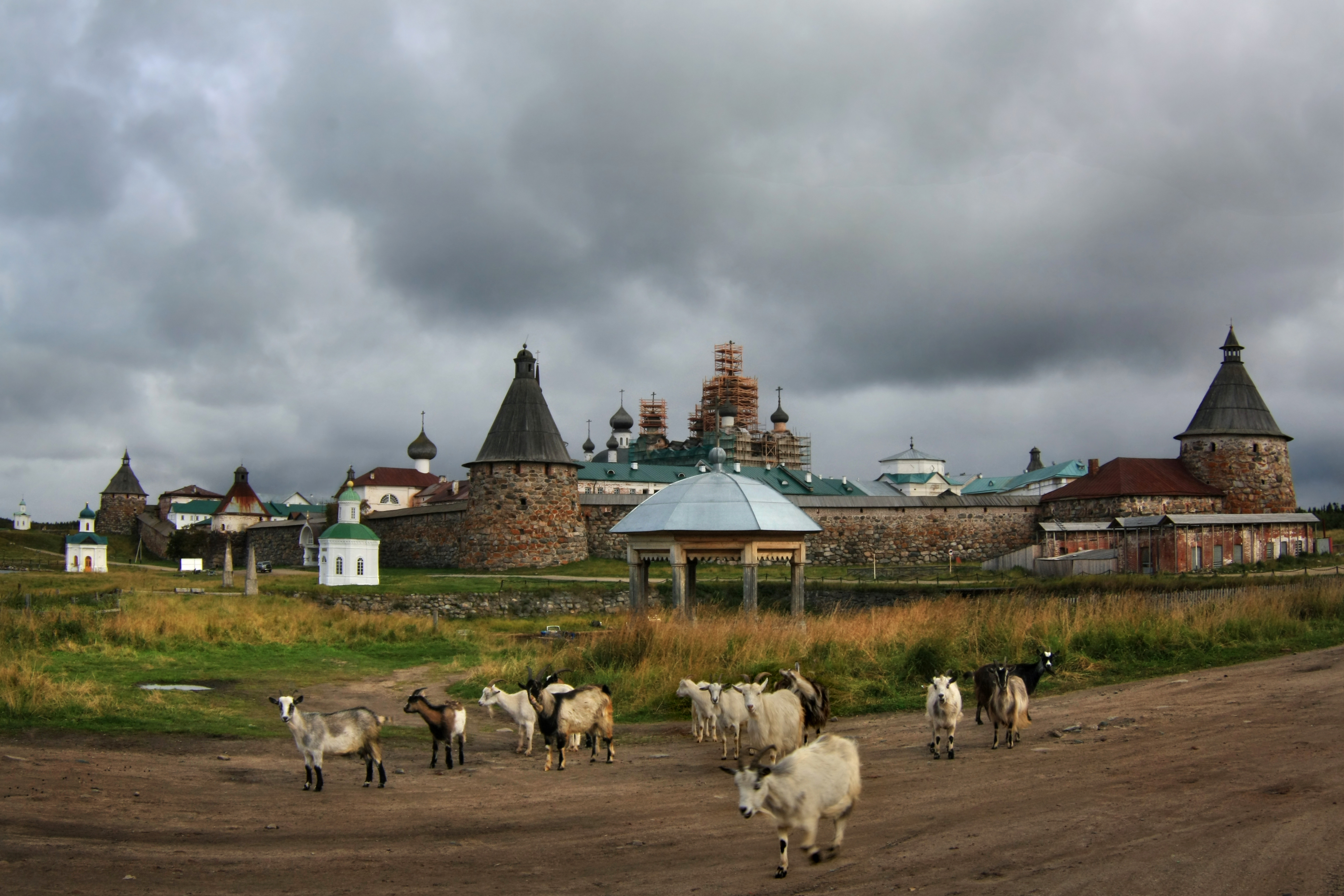
A herd of goats in Solovetsky Islands, Russia

Modern Solovetsky is essentially an adjunct of the Solovetsky Monastery. The economy of the settlement heavily depends on the tourism.

Solovetsky is served by the Solovki Airport, the only airport on the archipelago. There is regular air service to Arkhangelsk, as well as regular summer passenger sea connections to Arkhangelsk, Kem, and Belomorsk.
