= Solovetsky Islands =

Archipelago in the Onega Bay

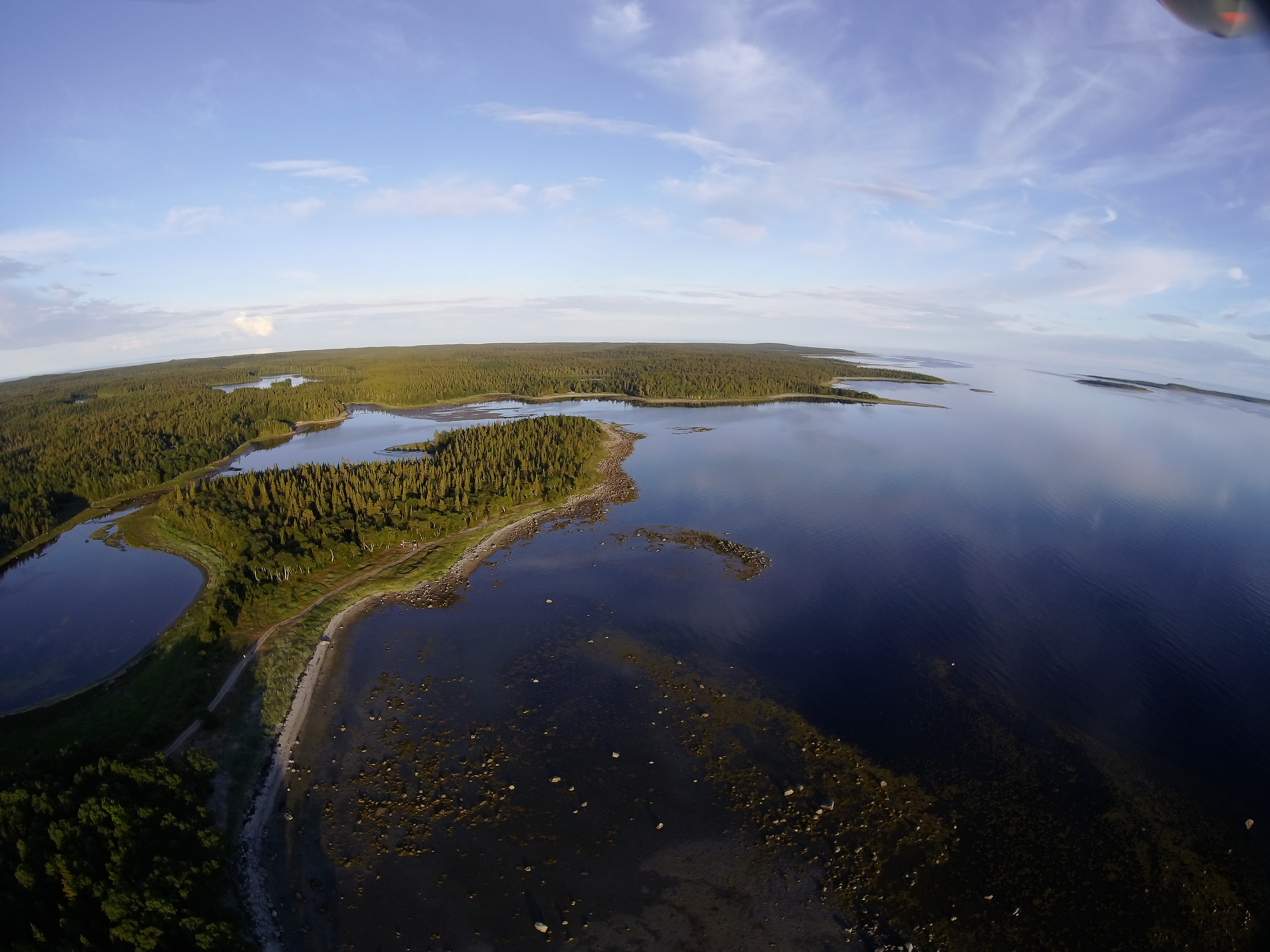
- Kislaya Bay of Bolshoy Solovetsky Island

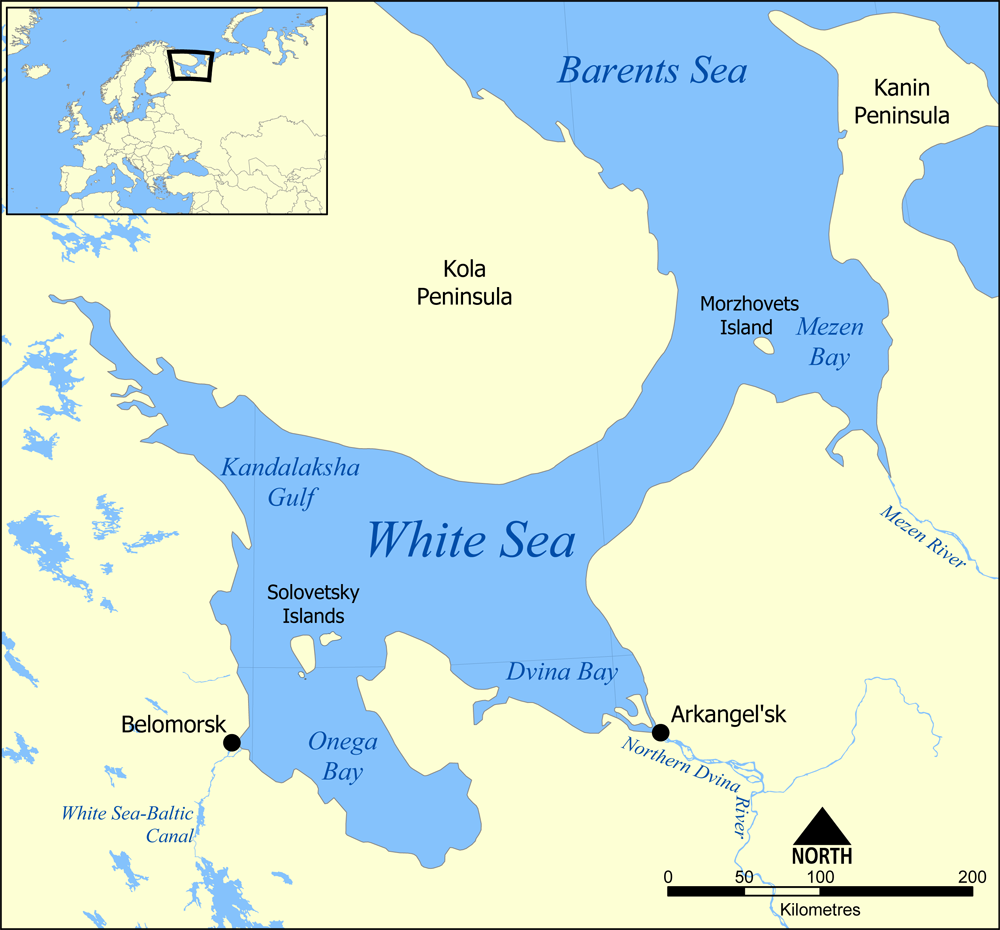
- Map of the White Sea showing the Solovetsky Islands

Geography
- Location: Onega Bay, White Sea
- Coordinates: 65°05′N 35°53′E
- Area: 347 km^{2} (134 sq mi)

Administration
- Russia
- Oblast: Arkhangelsk Oblast
- Capital and largest city: Solovetsky

Demographics
- Population: 861 (2010)

UNESCO World Heritage Site
- Official name: Cultural and Historic Ensemble of the Solovetsky Islands
- Type: Cultural
- Criteria: iv
- Designated: 1992 (16th session)
- Reference no.: 632
- Region: Europe and North America

The Solovetsky Islands (Russian: Соловецкие острова, IPA: [səlɐˈvʲetskʲɪj ɐstrɐˈva]), or Solovki (Russian: Соловки, IPA: [səlɐfˈkʲi]), are an archipelago located in the Onega Bay of the White Sea, Russia. As an administrative division, the islands are incorporated as Solovetsky District of Arkhangelsk Oblast, Russia. Within the framework of municipal divisions, they are incorporated as Solovetskoye Rural Settlement within Primorsky Municipal District. The administrative center of both divisions is the settlement of Solovetsky, located on Bolshoy Solovetsky Island. Almost all of the population of the islands lives in Solovetsky. As of the 2010 Census, the district had a population of 861 inhabitants.

The Solovetsky Monastery (founded in 1436), in 1923 became the site of the first Gulag establishment, the Solovki prison camp.

== Geography ==
The archipelago has a total area of 347 square kilometers (134 sq mi) and consists of six islands:

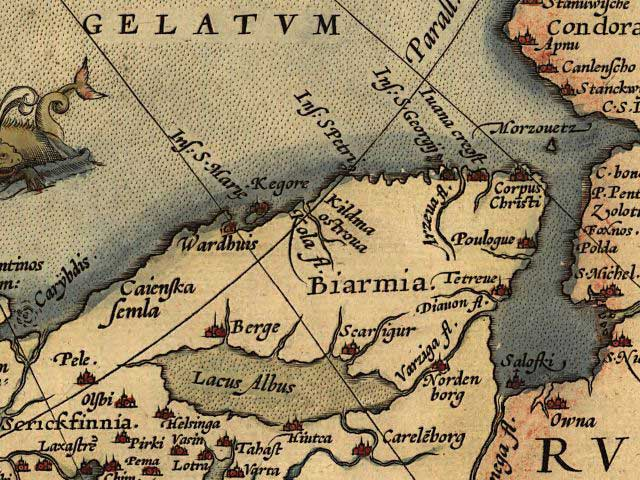
A 1570 map by Abraham Ortelius shows the location of "Salofki".

- Bolshoy Solovetsky Island, 246 km^{2} (95 sq mi)
- Anzersky Island (Anzer), 47 km^{2} (18 sq mi)
- Bolshaya Muksalma, 17 km^{2} (6.6 sq mi)
- Malaya Muksalma 0.57 km^{2} (0.22 sq mi)
- Bolshoy Zayatsky Island, 1.25 km^{2} (0.48 sq mi)
- Maly Zayatsky, 1.02 km^{2} (0.39 sq mi)

The islands separate the Onega Bay from the main volume of the White Sea. The closest mainland is the Onega Peninsula.

The shores of the islands are very indented. They are formed of granites and gneiss. The relief of the islands is hilly (the highest point is 107 m). Most of the Solovetsky Islands are covered with Scots Pine and Norway Spruce forests, which are partially swampy. There are numerous lakes, which were joined by monks so as to form a network of canals.

One interesting feature of these islands is stone labyrinths and other stone settings, especially the Stone labyrinths of Bolshoi Zayatsky Island. Such labyrinths were typical for Northern Europe, but most have perished and now Solovetsky Islands have some of the best remaining examples.

== Monastery ==
Historically the islands have been the setting of the famous Russian Orthodox Solovetsky Monastery complex. It was founded in the second quarter of the 15th century by two monks from the Kirillo-Belozersky Monastery. By the end of the 16th century, the abbey had emerged as one of the wealthiest landowners and most influential religious centres in Russia.

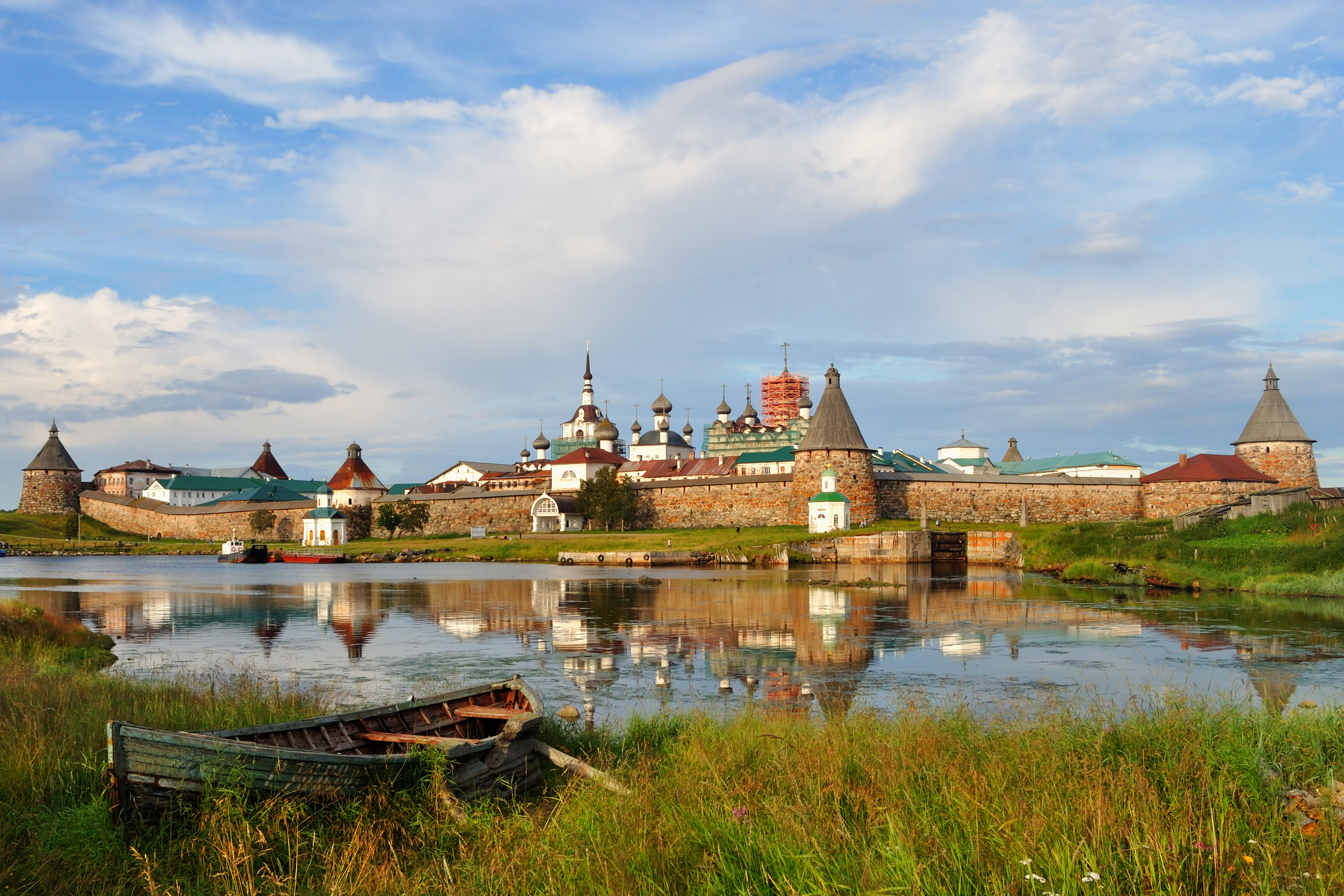
Ensemble of Solovetsky Monastery

The existing stronghold and its major churches were erected in stone during the early reign of Ivan the Terrible at the behest of St. Philip of Moscow. At the onset of the Schism of the Russian Church, the monks staunchly stuck to the faith of their fathers and expelled the tsar's representatives from the Solovki, precipitating the eight-year-long siege of the islands by the forces of Tsar Alexis.

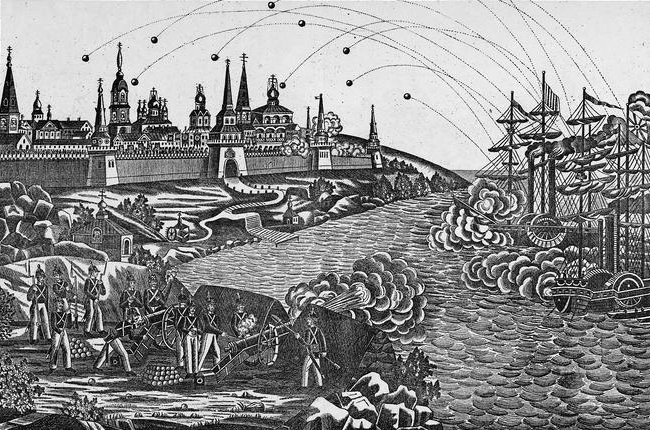
"Bombardment of the Solovetsky Monastery by the Royal Navy during the Crimean War". A lubok (popular print) from 1868.

Throughout the imperial period of Russian history, the monastery was renowned as a strong fortress which repelled foreign attacks during the Livonian War (16th century), Time of Troubles (17th century), the Crimean War (19th century), and the Russian Civil War (20th century).

In 1974, the Solovetsky Islands were designated a historical and architectural museum and a natural reserve of the Soviet Union. In 1992, they were inscribed on the World Heritage List "as an outstanding example of a monastic settlement in the inhospitable environment of northern Europe which admirably illustrates the faith, tenacity, and enterprise of later medieval religious communities". Today, the Solovki are seen as one of the major tourist magnets in the orbit of the Russian North.

== Labor camp ==
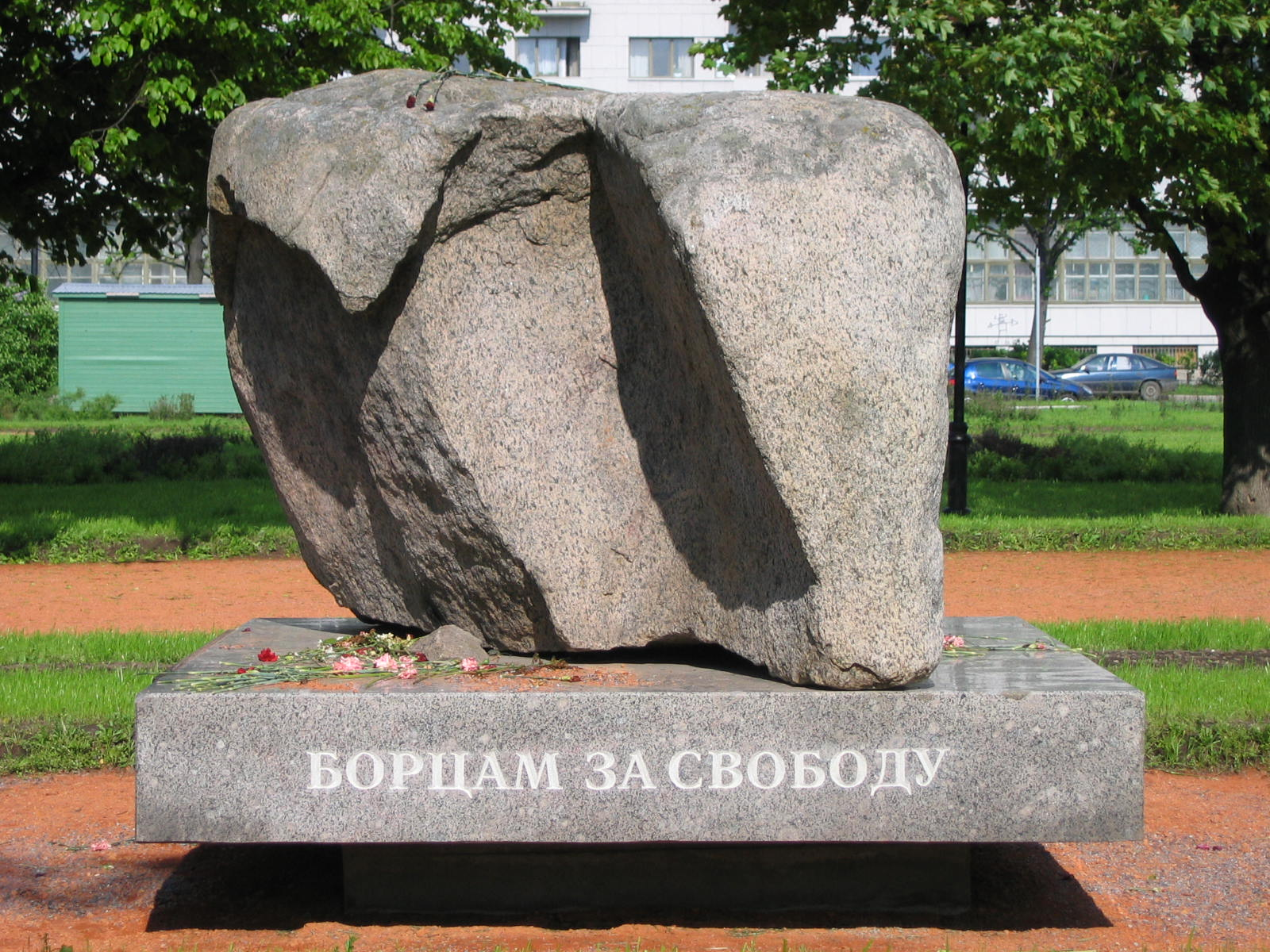
Memorial to the victims of political repression in the USSR in Saint Petersburg, made of a boulder from the Solovetsky Islands

After the October Revolution, the islands attained notoriety as the site of the first Soviet prison camp (gulag). The camp was inaugurated in 1921, while Vladimir Lenin was still at the helm of Soviet Russia. It was closed in 1939, on the eve of World War II. By the beginning of the war, there was a naval cadet training camp for the Soviet Northern Fleet.

== Transportation ==
The islands are served by the Solovki Airport. There is regular air service to Arkhangelsk, as well as ferry lines (summertime only) to Arkhangelsk, Kem, and Belomorsk.

== See also ==
- List of islands of Russia
