= Anzersky Island =

Island in Russia

Coordinates: 65°8′50″N 36°5′19″E

Anzersky
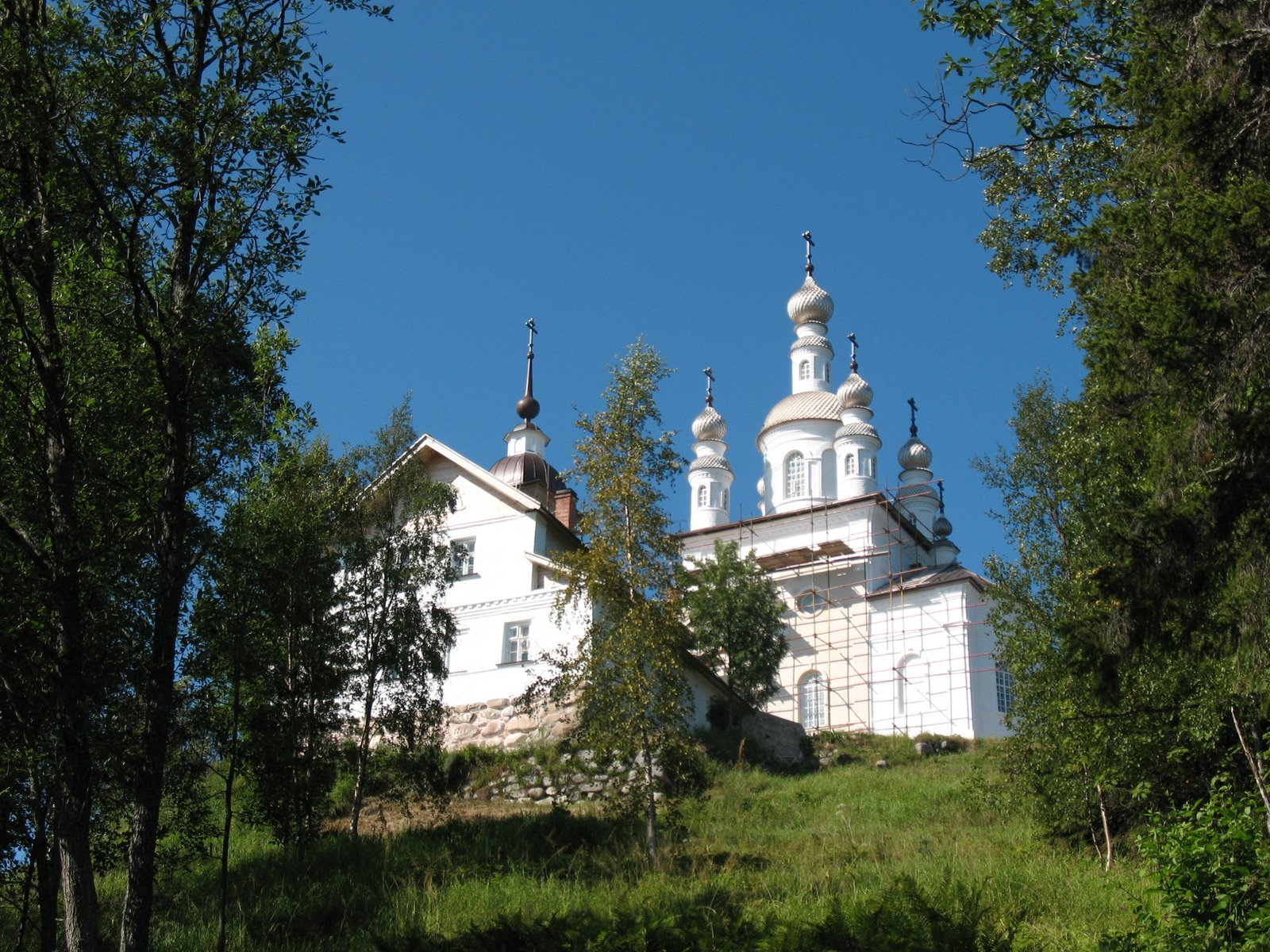
- Gogoltha Skete at Anzersky
- Interactive map of Anzersky

Geography
- Location: White Sea
- Archipelago: Solovetsky Islands
- Area: 17 km^{2} (6.6 sq mi)

Administration
- Russia
- Oblast: Arkhangelsk Oblast

Anzersky (Russian: А́нзерский) is one of the Solovetsky Islands.
