= Solovki Airport =

Airport in Russia

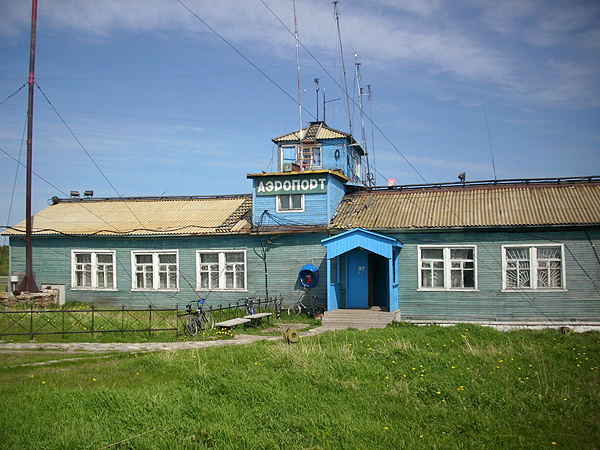
- IATA: CSH; ICAO: none

Summary
- Airport type: Public
- Elevation AMSL: 0 ft / 0 m
- Coordinates: 65°01′48″N 35°44′00″E
- Website: 2aoao.ru

Map
- Location of airport in Arkhangelsk Oblast

Runways
Direction	Length		Surface
Direction	ft	m	Surface
10/28	4,921	1,500	Steel

Solovki Airport (Russian: Аэропорт Соловки, Aėroport Solovki) (IATA: CSH) is an airport in Russia on the Solovetsky Islands. It is believed to have had a minor Russian Navy presence but primarily serves as a civilian airport for the island.

It appeared as a feature in the November/December 2016 issue of Airports of the World.

== Airlines and destinations ==
Airlines	Destinations
2nd Arkhangelsk United Aviation Division	Arkhangelsk–Vaskovo

== See also ==
- List of airports in Russia
