= Solovetsky District =

Solovetsky District Соловецкий район (Russian)
- District
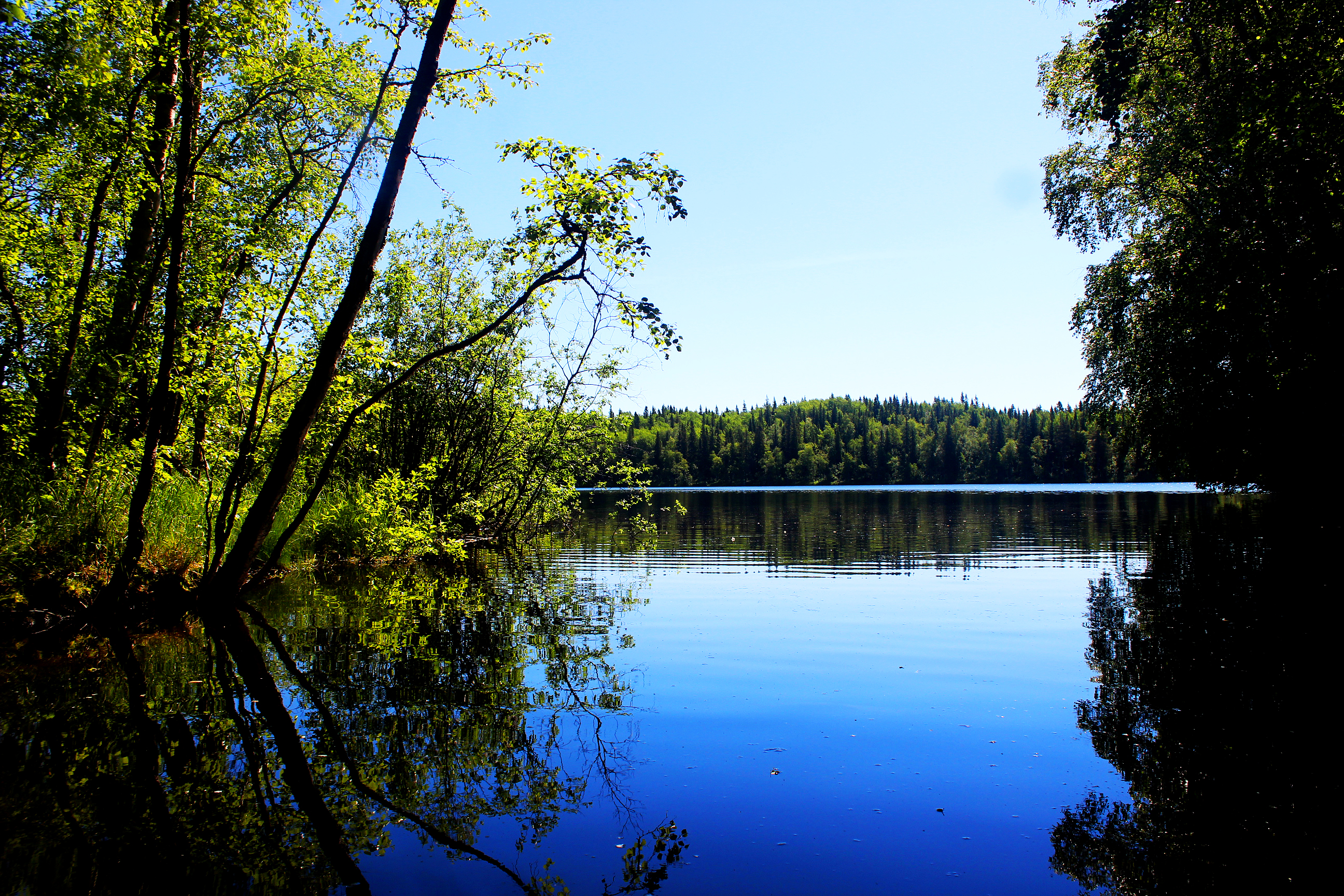
- Lake on Solovetsky Island

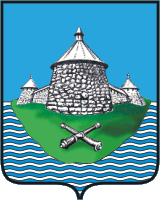
- Coat of arms
- Location of Solovetsky District in Arkhangelsk Oblast
- Coordinates: 65°01′N 35°42′E
- Country: Russia
- Federal subject: Arkhangelsk Oblast
- Established: 1987
- Administrative center: Solovetsky

Population (2010 Census)
  - Total: 861
  - Urban: 0%
  - Rural: 100%

Administrative structure
  - Inhabited localities: 4 rural localities

Municipal structure
  - Municipally incorporated as: Solovetskoye Rural Settlement of Primorsky Municipal District
- Time zone: UTC+3 (MSK)
- OKTMO ID: 11652458

Solovetsky District (Russian: Солове́цкий райо́н) is an administrative district (raion), one of the twenty-one in Arkhangelsk Oblast, Russia. It is located on the Solovetsky Islands archipelago in the White Sea. Its administrative center is the rural locality (a settlement) of Solovetsky. District's population: 861 (2010 census); 968 (2002 census); 1,317 (1989 Soviet census).

== History ==
The Solovetsky Monastery was founded in the 15th century and quickly became one of the most influential Orthodox monasteries in Russia. The islands were administered by the monastery until the October Revolution in 1917. Formally, they belonged to Archangelgorod Governorate (1708-1780), Vologda Viceroyalty (1780-1796), and Arkhangelsk Governorate (1796-1929). In 1929, the islands were included into newly established Northern Krai as an island territory (not a part of any district).

Solovetsky District was established on March 23, 1987. On January 1, 2006, Solovetsky Municipal District was merged into Primorsky Municipal District, although its administrative status as a district remained unaffected.

== Administrative and municipal status ==
Administratively, Solovetsky District is unique in Arkhangelsk Oblast because it cannot be transformed in any way other than merging it into Primorsky District as a selsoviet. Municipally, the district is incorporated as Solovetskoye Rural Settlement within Primorsky Municipal District.
