= August 8 (Eastern Orthodox liturgics) =

Day in the Eastern Orthodox liturgical calendar

Eastern Orthodox liturgical calendar
August 7	August 8	August 9
August 8 O.S. ≍ August 21 N.S. August 8 N.S ≍ July 26 O.S.

An Eastern Orthodox cross

August 8 in Eastern Orthodox liturgical calendars is a feast day and a day of commemoration of saints and martyrs. Although some Orthodox churches use the Revised Julian Calendar and others use the traditional Julian calendar, the fixed commemorations for their respective August 8 are broadly the same, no matter which calendar is used. (Note: Despite the dates being the same, the days to which they refer typically differ by 13 days. The notation Old Style or O.S. is sometimes used to indicate a date in the traditional Julian Calendar (the "Old Calendar"). The notation New Style or N.S. indicates a date in the Revised Julian calendar (the "New Calendar").)

== Feasts ==
- Afterfeast of the Transfiguration of Our Lord, God, and Savior Jesus Christ. (Note: The hymns at Vespers today speak of the sun appearing dim compared to the divine light of the Transfiguration. In His compassion for humanity, Christ took on mortal flesh, yet Peter, James and John saw the radiance of His glory. The incarnate Lord “made Adam’s darkened image to shine again” when He appeared on earth “arrayed in the original beauty of the Image (Genesis 1:26).)

== Saints ==
- Saint Myron the Wonderworker, Archbishop of Crete (350) (Note: "In Crete, St. Myron, a bishop renowned for miracles." See also: (in Greek) Άγιος Μύρων (επίσκοπος). Βικιπαίδεια. (Greek Wikipedia).)
- Martyrs Eleutherius and Leonides, of Constantinople, and many infants with them, by fire (4th century)
- Martyr Gormizdas (Hormisdas) of Persia (418)
- The Ten Venerable ascetics of Egypt.
- The two martyrs of Tyre, dragged to death.
- Martyr Styracius, by the sword.
- Saint Emilian the Confessor, Bishop of Cyzicus (820) (Note: "At Cyzicum, in Hellespont, St. Emilian, bishop, who ended his life in exile after having suffered much from the emperor Leo for the worship of holy images." Name days celebrated today include: Emilian (Αἰμιλιανός); Emiliani (Αἰμιλιανή).) (see also: January 8)

== Pre-Schism Western saints ==
- Saints Cyriacus, Largus, Smaragdus and Companions, a group of twenty-four martyrs who suffered in Rome under Diocletian (304) (Note: "AT Rome, the holy martyrs Cyriacus, deacon, Largus, and Smaragdus, with twenty others, who suffered on the 16th of March, in the persecution of Diocletian and Maximian. Their bodies were buried on the Salarian road by the priest John, but were on this day translated by pope St. Marcellus to the estate of Lucina, on the Ostian way. Afterwards they were brought to Rome, and placed in the Church of St. Mary in Via Lata.")
- Saint Severus, a priest who came from India to enlighten the area around Vienne in France (c. 445) (Note: "At Vienne, in France, St. Severus, priest and confessor, who undertook a painful journey from India in order to preach the Gospel in that city, and converted a great number of Pagans to the faith of Christ by his labors and miracles.")
- Saint Leobald (Leodebod, Leodebaldus), founder of Fleury Abbey, later called Saint-Benoît-sur-Loire, near Orleans in France (650)
- Saint Mummolus (Mommolus, Mommolenus), second Abbot of Fleury in France (c. 678) (Note: He had relics of Sts Benedict and Scholastica brought from Italy and so Fleury came to be known as Saint-Benoît-sur-Loire.)
- Saint Sigrada, mother of Sts Leodegarius and Warinus, nun at the convent in Soissons in France (c. 678)
- Saint Ternatius (Terniscus), eleventh Bishop of Besançon in the east of France (c. 680)
- Saint Ellidius (Illog), Patron-saint of Hirnant in Powys in Wales and of a church in the Scilly Isles (7th century)
- Saint Gedeon, the thirteenth Bishop of Besançon in France (796)
- Saint Ultan, priest at the monastery of St Peter in Crayke in Yorkshire (8th century) (Note: Born in Ireland, he was a priest at the monastery of St Peter in Crayke in Yorkshire in England. He excelled in the art of illumination.)
- Saint Rathard (Rathard von Andechs), a noble who became a priest and founded the monastery of Diessen (Dießen-Andechs) in Germany (815)

== Post-Schism Orthodox saints ==
- Venerable Theodosius the New, Igumen of Orov.
- Venerable Gregory, Iconographer, of the Kiev Caves (12th century)
- Venerable Gregory of Sinai (Mt. Athos) (1346)
- Saint Zosimus the Sinaite, of Tuman Monastery, Serbia (14th century)
- Saint Gregory, Wonderworker, of the Kiev Caves (14th century)
- New Martyr Triantaphyllos of Zagora, Thessaly, at Constantinople (1680) (Note: Name days celebrated today include: Triantaphillos (Τριαντάφυλλος); Triantaphyllia (Τριανταφυλλιά).)
- New Martyr Anastasius (Spaso) of Radovishte in Strumica, at Thessaloniki (1794)
- Monkmartyr Euthymius, Abbot of the Monastery of St. John the Baptist, at David Gareja monastery complex, Georgia (1804)
- Saint Philaret of Ichalka, Ivanovo (1913)
- Saint Kallinikos (Poulos) of Edessa, Metropolitan of Edessa, Pella and Almopia (el) (1984) (Note: He was officially glorified by the Holy Synod of the Ecumenical Patriarchate on June 23, 2020, to be commemorated each year on August 8. The official statement from the Ecumenical Patriarchate was as follows: (in Greek) "α) ἀπεφασίσθη, ἐπί τῇ βάσει ἐκθέσεως τῆς Κανονικῆς Ἐπιτροπῆς, ἡ ἁγιοκατάταξις τοῦ μακαριστοῦ Μητροπολίτου Ἐδέσσης καί Πέλλης κυροῦ Καλλινίκου, τῆς μνήμης αὐτοῦ μελλούσης ἑορτάζεσθαι τῇ 8ῃ Αὐγούστου.")

=== New martyrs and confessors ===
- New Hieromartyr Joseph (Baranov), Hieromonk of the Tolga Monastery (Yaroslavl) (1918)
- New Hieromartyr Nicholas Shumkov, Priest (1937)
- New Hieromartyr Nicodemus (Krotkov), Archbishop of Kostroma and Galich (1938) (Note: He was canonized in the Kostroma diocese in 1995 as a local saint, to be venerated by believers during the Synaxis of the Saints of Kostroma (January 23). In 2000 he was included among the New Martyrs and Confessors of Russia, by the Russian Orthodox Church.) (see also: January 23)
- New Hieromartyr Alexandru Baltagă of Bessarabia, priest (1941)

== Other commemorations ==
- Consecration of the Church of the Apostles Peter and Paul, in the year 891 AD (6399 AM), in reign of Leo VI the Wise, when there occurred a solar eclipse from the sixth to the ninth hours.
- Consecration of the Church of the Most Holy Theotokos in Jerusalem.
- "Tolga" Icon of the Most Holy Theotokos (1314)
- First (1566) and second (1992) translations of the relics of Sts. Zosimas (1478) and Sabbatius (1435), of Solovki. (Note: "The patrons of Ukrainian beekeepers, Savvatij and Zossima more than likely were tonsured at the Kyiv Caves Lavra before going to Solovki where they introduced beekeeping. Their icons are often placed in outdoor shrines among bee-hives together with those of St John the Baptist and St Alexius the Man of God.")
- Translation of the relics (1992) of St. Herman of Solovki (1479)
- Uncovering of the relics (2002) of St. Barlaam of Chikoisk Monastery (Siberia) (Note: See also: Чикойский Иоанно-Предтеченский монастырь. Википедии (Russian Wikipedia).) (1846)

== Icon gallery ==
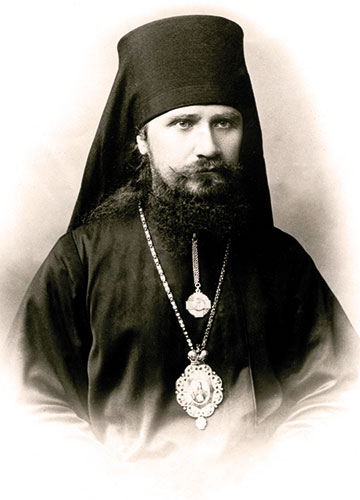
New Hieromartyr Nicodemus (Krotkov).

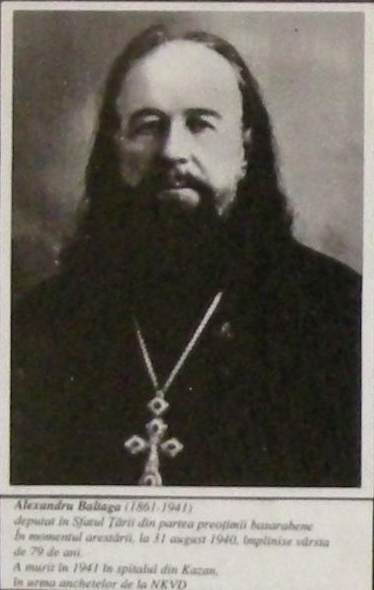
New Hieromartyr Alexandru Baltagă of Bessarabia.

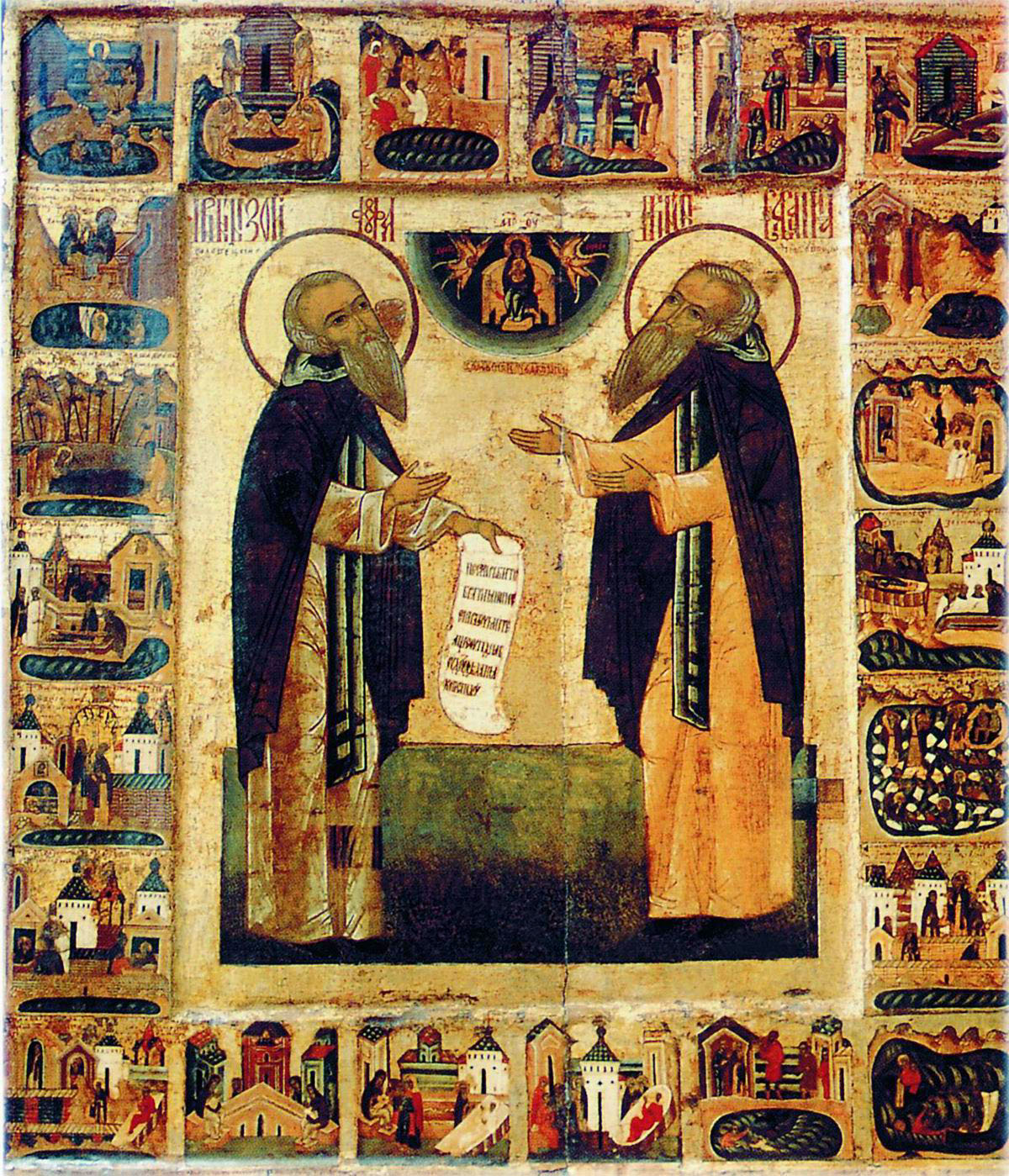
Saints Zosima (left) and Savvaty (right) with their lives.

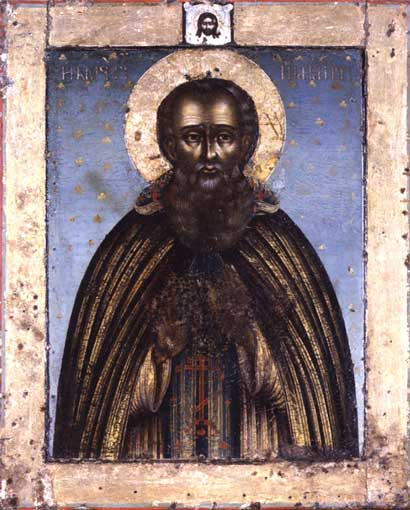
St. Herman of Solovki.

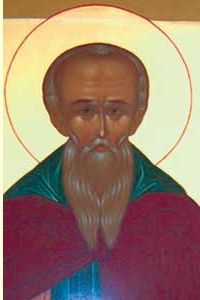
St. Barlaam of Chikoisk Monastery (Siberia).

== Sources ==
- August 8 / August 21. Orthodox Calendar (PRAVOSLAVIE.RU).
- August 21 / August 8. HOLY TRINITY RUSSIAN ORTHODOX CHURCH (A parish of the Patriarchate of Moscow).
- August 8. OCA - The Lives of the Saints.
- The Autonomous Orthodox Metropolia of Western Europe and the Americas (ROCOR). St. Hilarion Calendar of Saints for the year of our Lord 2004. St. Hilarion Press (Austin, TX). p. 58.
- Menologion: The Eighth Day of the Month of August. Orthodoxy in China.
- August 8. Latin Saints of the Orthodox Patriarchate of Rome.
- The Roman Martyrology. Transl. by the Archbishop of Baltimore. Last Edition, According to the Copy Printed at Rome in 1914. Revised Edition, with the Imprimatur of His Eminence Cardinal Gibbons. Baltimore: John Murphy Company, 1916. pp. 236-237.
- Rev. Richard Stanton. A Menology of England and Wales, or, Brief Memorials of the Ancient British and English Saints Arranged According to the Calendar, Together with the Martyrs of the 16th and 17th Centuries. London: Burns & Oates, 1892. pp. 386-387.

Greek Sources

- Great Synaxaristes: (in Greek) 8 ΑΥΓΟΥΣΤΟΥ. ΜΕΓΑΣ ΣΥΝΑΞΑΡΙΣΤΗΣ.
- (in Greek) Συναξαριστής. 8 Αυγούστου. ECCLESIA.GR. (H ΕΚΚΛΗΣΙΑ ΤΗΣ ΕΛΛΑΔΟΣ).

Russian Sources

- (in Russian) 21 августа (8 августа). Православная Энциклопедия под редакцией Патриарха Московского и всея Руси Кирилла (электронная версия). (Orthodox Encyclopedia - Pravenc.ru).
