= Millennium of Russia =

Bronze monument in Novgorod Oblast, Russia

Coordinates: 58°31′16.05″N 31°16′30.87″E

- Тысячелетие России (Russian)
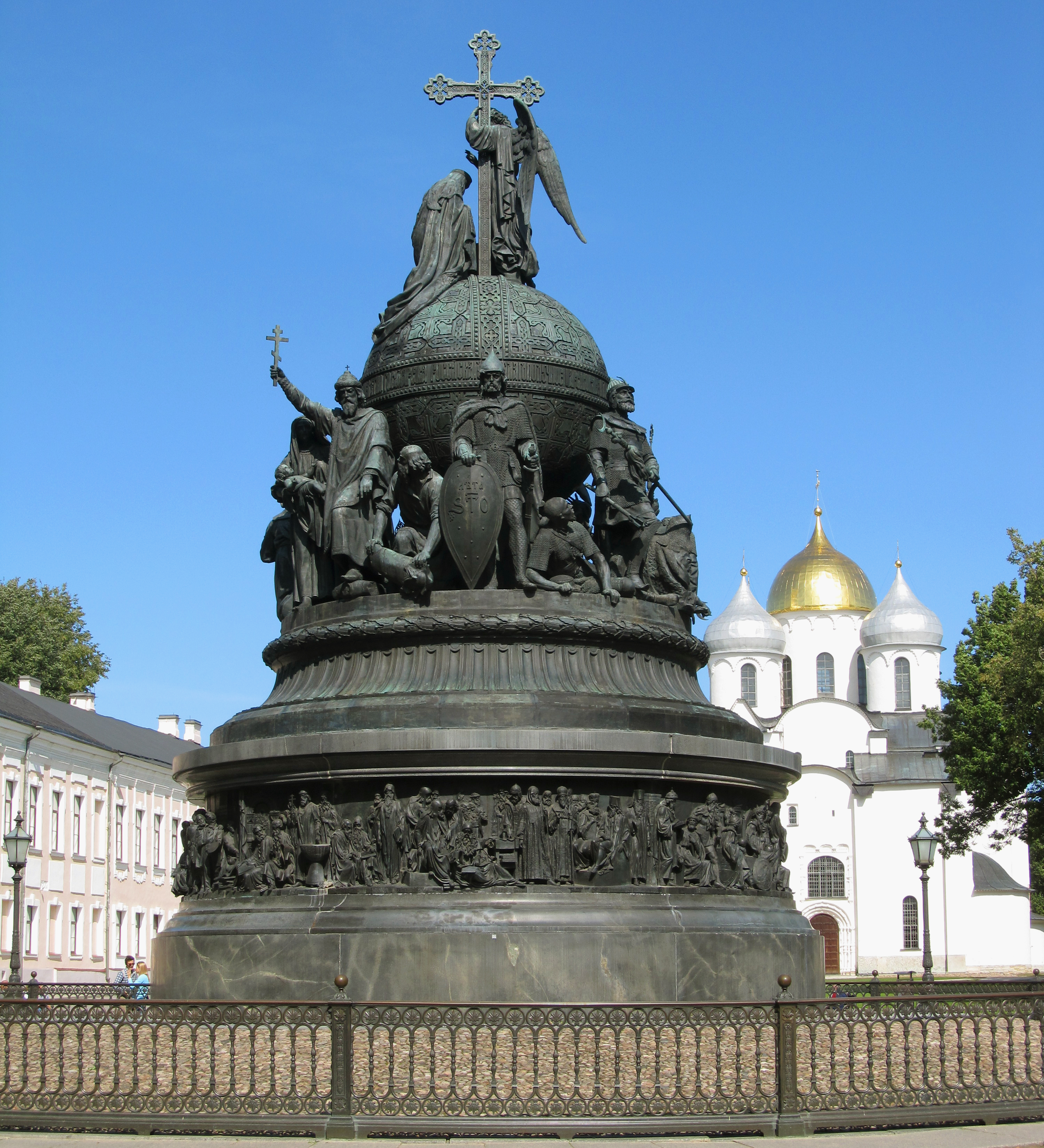
- Interactive map of Millennium of Russia
- Location: Veliky Novgorod, Novgorod Oblast, Russia

History
- Built: 1862

Site notes
- Height: 15.7m

UNESCO World Heritage Site
- Official name: Historic Monuments of Novgorod and Surroundings
- Type: Cultural
- Criteria: ii, iv, vi
- Designated: 1992 (16th session)
- Reference no.: 604
- Region: Eastern Europe

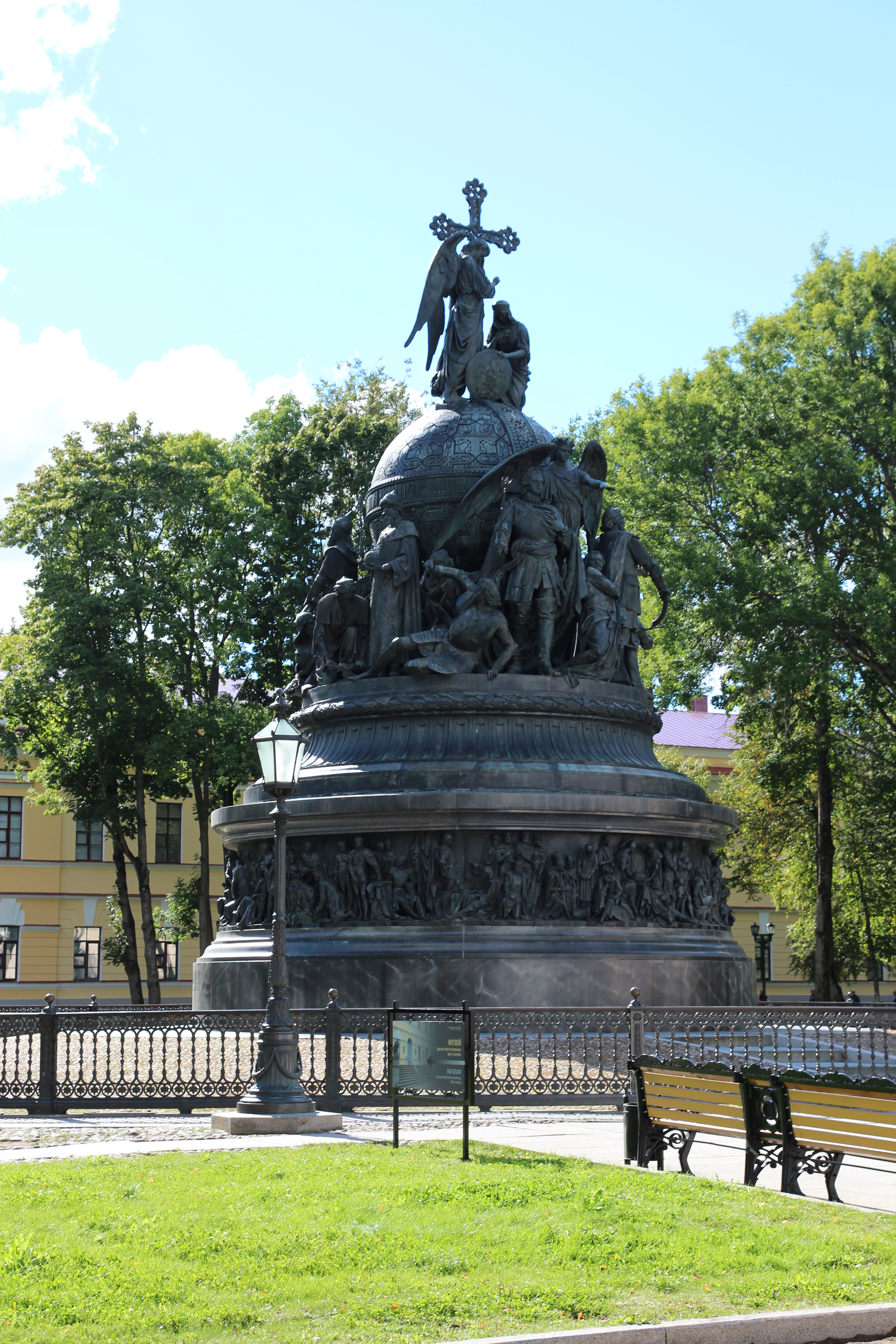
The Millennium of Russia.

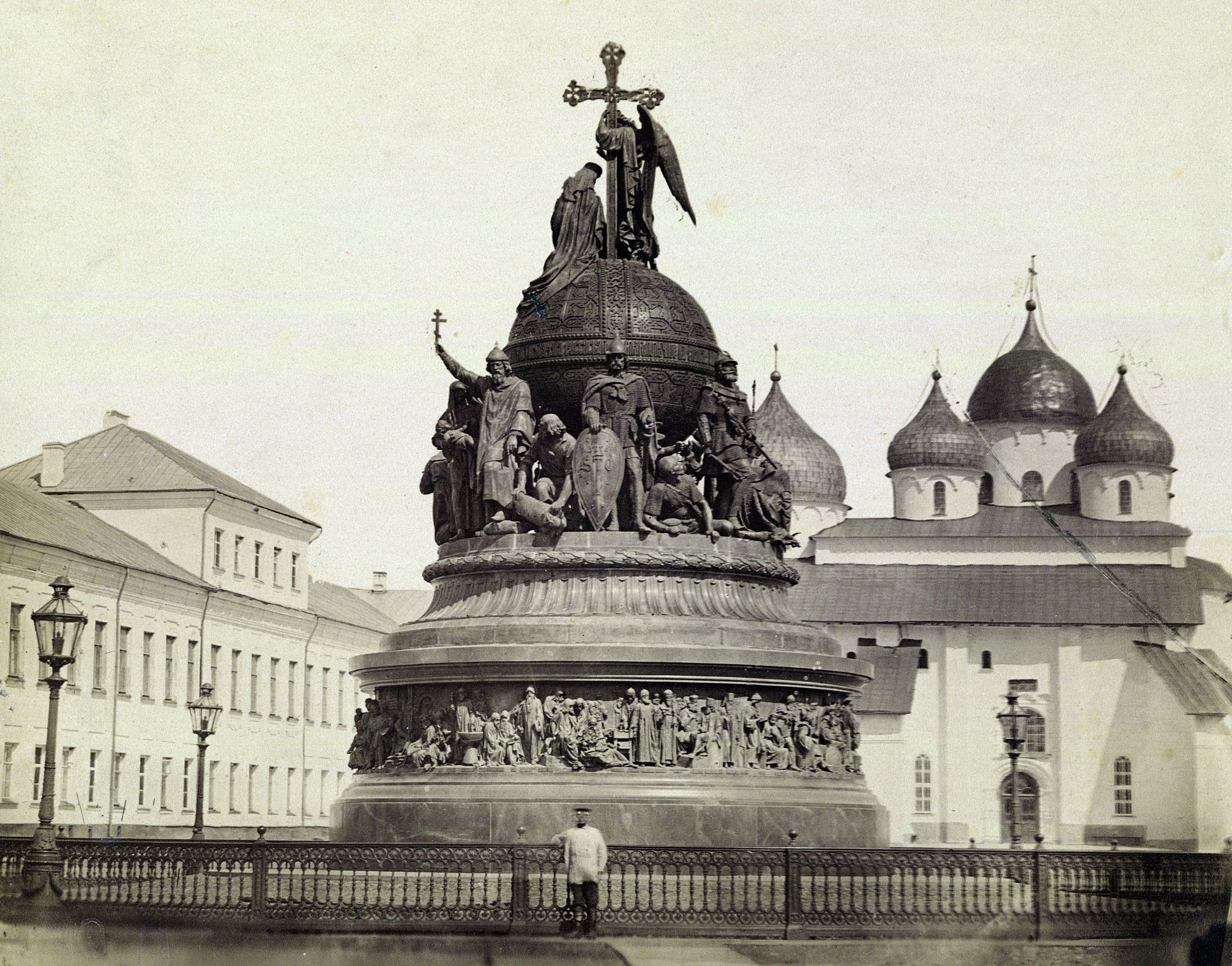
The Millennium of Russia (1862), with Saint Sophia Cathedral in the background. The upper row of figures is cast in the round and the lower one is in relief.

The Millennium of Russia (Russian: Тысячелетие России, romanized: Tysyacheletiye Rossii) is a bronze monument in the Novgorod Kremlin. It was erected in 1862 to celebrate the millennium of Rurik's arrival to Novgorod, an event traditionally taken as a starting point of the history of Russian statehood.

== History ==
A competition to design the monument was held in 1859. An architect Viktor Hartmann and an artist Mikhail Mikeshin were declared the winners. Mikeshin's design called for a grandiose, 15-metre-high globus cruciger on a bell-shaped pedestal. It was to be encircled with several tiers of sculptures representing Russian monarchs, clerics, generals, and artists active during various periods of Russian history.

Mikeshin himself was not a sculptor, therefore the 129 individual statues for the monument were made by the leading Russian sculptors of the day, including his friend Ivan Schroeder and the promising new sculptor, Alexander Opekushin. Rather unexpectedly for such an official project, the tsars and commanders were represented side by side with sixteen eminent personalities of Russian culture: Lomonosov, Pushkin, Lermontov, Gogol, Karl Brullov, Mikhail Glinka, etc.

As for the Russian rulers, Ivan the Terrible is famously absent from the monument due to his role in the 1570 pillage and massacre of Novgorod by the Oprichnina. Alongside the Muscovite princes, the medieval Lithuanian dynasts such as Gediminas or Vytautas the Great who reigned over the Eastern Slavs of the present-day Belarus and Ukraine are represented.

The most expensive Russian monument up to that time, it was erected at a cost of 400,000 roubles, mostly raised by public subscription. In order to provide an appropriate pedestal for the huge sculpture, sixteen blocks of Sortavala granite were brought to Novgorod, each weighing in excess of 35 tons. The bronze monument itself weighs 100 tons.

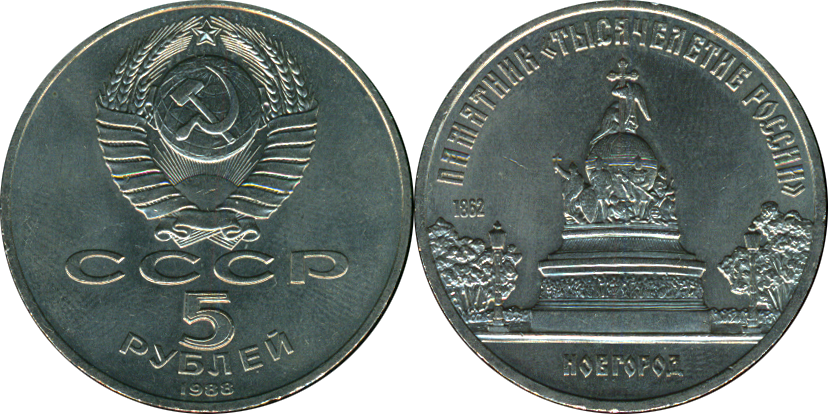
Commemorative coin issued in the USSR in 1988.

At the time when the monument was inaugurated, many art critics felt that it was overloaded with figures. Supporters regard Mikeshin's design as harmonious with the medieval setting of the Kremlin, and subtly accentuating the vertical thrust and grandeur of the nearby 11th-century Saint Sophia Cathedral.

During World War II, the Germans dismantled the monument, and prepared it to be transported to Germany. However, the Red Army regained control of Novgorod and the monument was restored to public view in 1944. A 5-ruble commemorative coin was released in the USSR in 1988 to commemorate the monument. The Millennium of Baptism of Russia was the first state-sponsored national and religious festival since the cessation of the State atheistic policy during the early 1980s.

== Upper level ==
Picture	Description
	An angel (personification of the Orthodox Church) supporting the cross and blessing a kneeling woman in Russian national costume, leaning on a shield with the coat of arms and the date "1862". The figures are made by Ivan Schroeder, the cross was made according to the drawing by Viktor Hartmann. This group is installed at the top of the orb (symbol of the monarch's power), covered with a cross pattern. The orb is surrounded by an inscription: "To the Millennium of the Russian state, which happened in the prosperous reign of Emperor Alexander II, year 1862"

== Middle level ==
Picture	Name	Name in Russian	Historical year	Description
	The arrival of the Varangians in Rus	Призвание варягов на Русь	862	The statue of the first warrior prince Rurik with helmet and shield with the inscription "year 6370" (Byzantine calendar). Rurik wears a fur on his shoulders, behind him the pagan Slavic god Veles can be seen. The figure looks south-west, in the direction of Kiev.
	The Christianization of Rus	Крещение Руси	988	In the center, the Kievan Grand Prince Vladimir the Great can be found, raises an Orthodox cross. Besides, a woman holds her child for baptism and a Slav dispossesses the pagan god Perun. The composition looks in the south-eastern direction.
	Beginning of the expulsion of the Tatars	Начало изгнания татар	1380	Dmitry Donskoi, the victor in the Battle of Kulikovo, holds a Russian mace in his right hand. At his feet lies Mamai, the defeated warlord of the Golden Horde. In the left hand Dmitry Donskoi holds a captured bunchuk, the Tatar symbol of power. The composition looks east.
	Foundation of an independent Russian Tsardom	Основание самодержавного царства Русского	1491	Ivan the Great in a dress of Byzantine emperors with Monomach's Cap. In his hands he holds a scepter and a globus cruciger. In front of him, a Tatar is kneeling, beside him, a Lithuanian is lying, representing Grand Duchy of Lithuania, as well as a Teutonic knight with a broken sword, representing the Order of Teutonic Knights. The composition looks north-east.
	Enthronement of the Romanov dynasty	Начало династии Романовых	1613	The young Tsar Michael of Russia ascends to the Russian throne after the overcoming of the Time of Troubles. Prince Dmitry Pozharsky who represents the nobility protects him with his sword while Kuzma Minin who represents the people offers him the Monomach's Cap and the scepter. In the background, a figure of a Siberian Cossack can be found which symbolizes the colonization of Siberia to come.
	Creation of the Russian Empire	Образование Российской империи	1721	Peter the Great with laurel wreath and scepter in the right hand is supported by an angel showing him the way to the north-west where the future city of Saint-Petersburg shall be founded. At Peter's feet, defeated Swede can be found trying to protect his torn flag. This symbolizes the Russian victory in the Great Northern War. The composition looks north-west.

== Bottom level ==
Men of enlightenment	Statesmen	Military men and heroes	Writers and artists
Cyril and Methodius, missionaries of Slavs; Olga of Kiev, Grand Princess of Kiev; Vladimir the Great, Grand Prince of Kiev; Abraham, bishop of Rostov; Anthony of Kiev, founder of the Monastery of the Caves; Theodosius of Kiev, Kievan monk; Kuksha of the Kiev Caves, Kievan monk; Nestor the Chronicler, chronicler of the Russian history; Cyril of White Lake, Founder of the Kirillo-Belozersky Monastery; Stephen of Perm, Bishop and Missionary of Perm; Alexius, Metropolitan of Kiev and Moscow; Sergius of Radonezh, spiritual leader; Peter Mogila, Metropolitan of Kiev; Zosima of Solovki, Founder of the Solovetsky Monastery; Alexis, Tsar; Savvatiy, Founder of the Solovetsky Monastery; Jonah, Metropolitan of Moscow; Macarius, Metropolitan of Moscow; Varsonofius, Archbishop of Tver; Guriy, Archbishop of Kazan; Konstantin Ostrozhsky, Prince and voivode of Kiev; Nikon, Patriarch of Moscow; Fyodor Rtishchev, Philanthropist; Dimitry of Rostov, Churchman and composer; Tikhon of Zadonsk, Archbishop of Ladoga and Voronezh; Mitrofan, Archbishop of Voronezh; Georgy Konissky, Archbishop of Belarus; Feofan Prokopovich, Archbishop of Novgorod; Statesman; Platon Levshin, Metropolitan of Moscow; Innocent, Archbishop of Chersonesos Taurica	Yaroslav the Wise, Grand Prince of Kiev; Vladimir Monomakh, Grand Prince of Kiev; Gediminas, Grand Prince of Lithuania; Algirdas, Grand Prince of Lithuania; Vytautas, Grand Prince of Lithuania; Ivan the Great, Grand Prince of Moscow; Sylvester, clergyman and statesman; Anastasia Romanovna, first wife of Ivan the Terrible; Alexey Adashev, Ivan IV's bosom friend and advisor; Hermogenes, Patriarch of Moscow; Michael Romanov, first Romanov tsar; Filaret, Patriarch of Moscow; Afanasy Ordin-Nashchokin, Diplomat; Artamon Matveyev, Statesman and Diplomat; Maximus the Greek, Writer and scholar; Peter the Great, Tsar and first emperor; Yakov Dolgorukov, advisor to Peter I; Ivan Betskoy, Statesman and Reformer; Catherine the Great, Empress; Alexander Bezborodko, Statesman and Diplomat; Grigory Potyomkin, Statesman and Diplomat; Viktor Kochubey, Statesman and Diplomat; Alexander I, Emperor; Mikhail Speransky, Statesman; Mikhail Vorontsov, Field Marshal; Nicholas I, Emperor	Sviatoslav I of Kiev, Grand Prince of Kiev; Mstislav Mstislavich, Prince of Novgorod and Galicia; Daniel of Galicia, Prince of Galicia; Daumantas, Prince of Pskov; Alexander Nevsky, Grand Prince of Vladimir; Michael, Prince of Tver; Dmitry Donskoi, Grand Prince of Moscow; Kęstutis, Grand Prince of Lithuania; Daniil Kholmsky, general; Mikhail Vorotynsky, Field Marshal; Daniil Shchenya, military leader; Marfa Boretskaya, Posadnik of Novgorod; Yermak Timofeyevich, Cossack leader; Mikhail Skopin-Shuisky, military leader; Dmitry Pozharsky, Prince; Kuzma Minin, Organizer of the People's Army; Avraamy Palitsyn, Monk and Writer colspan = 2; rowspan = 20|; Bohdan Khmelnytsky, Hetman of the Zaporizhian cossacks; Ivan Susanin, Folk hero; Boris Sheremetev, Field Marshal and Diplomat; Mikhail Golitsyn, Field Marshal; Pyotr Saltykov, Field Marshal; Burkhard von Münnich, Field Marshal; Alexei Orlov, General; Pyotr Rumyantsev, Field Marshal; Alexander Suvorov, Generalissimo; Michael Barclay de Tolly, Field Marshal; Mikhail Kutuzov, Field Marshal; Dmitry Senyavin, Admiral; Matvei Platov, General; Pyotr Bagration, General; Karl Diebitsch-Zabalkansky, Field Marshal; Ivan Paskevich, Field Marshal; Mikhail Lazarev, Admiral; Vladimir Kornilov, Vice-Admiral; Pavel Nakhimov, Admiral	Mikhail Lomonosov, polymath; Denis Fonvizin, playwright; Alexander Kokorinov, architect; Gavrila Derzhavin, poet and statesman; Fyodor Volkov, actor; Nikolai Karamzin, playwright and historian; Ivan Krylov, poet of fables; Vasily Zhukovsky, poet and translator; Nikolay Gnedich, Poet and translator; Aleksandr Griboyedov, Writer and Diplomat; Mikhail Lermontov, poet and writer; Alexander Pushkin, poet and writer; Nikolai Gogol, Writer; Mikhail Glinka, Composer; Karl Briullov, Painter; Dmitry Bortniansky, Composer

== Gallery ==
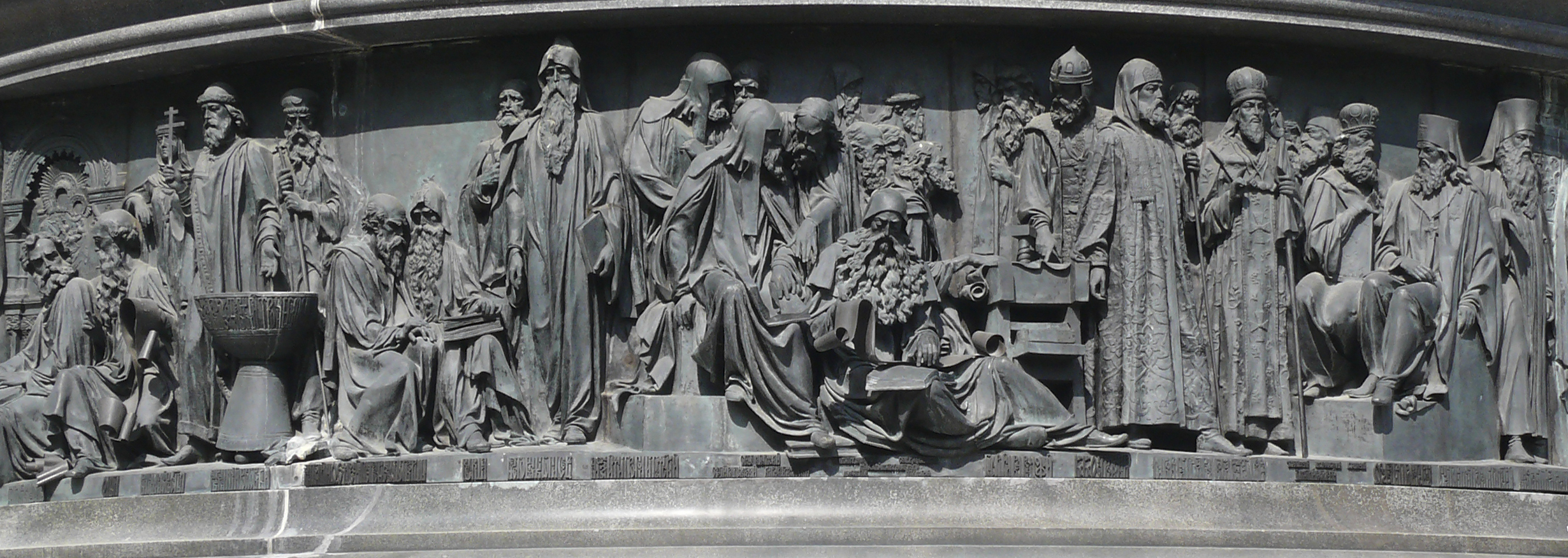
Men of enlightenment

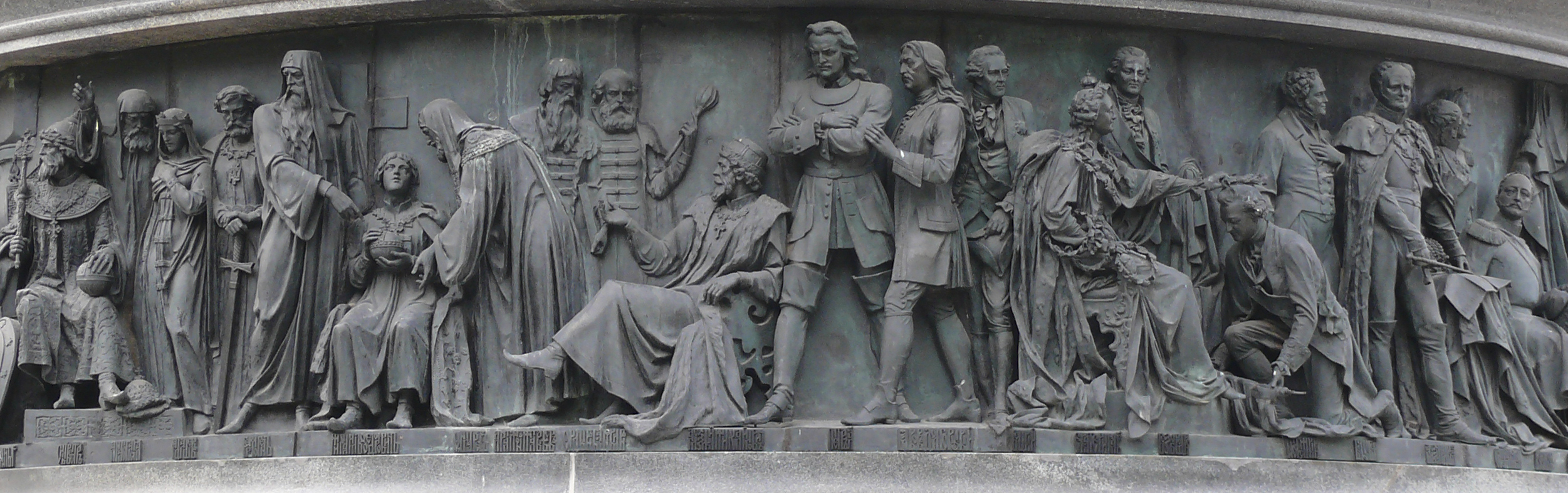
Statesmen

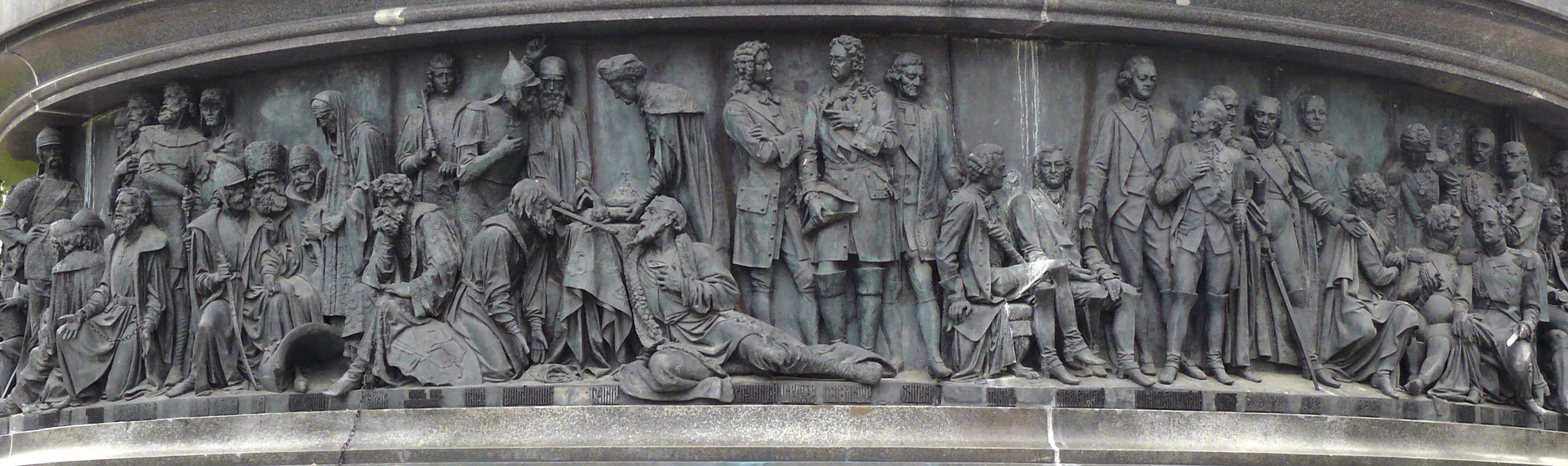
Militarymen

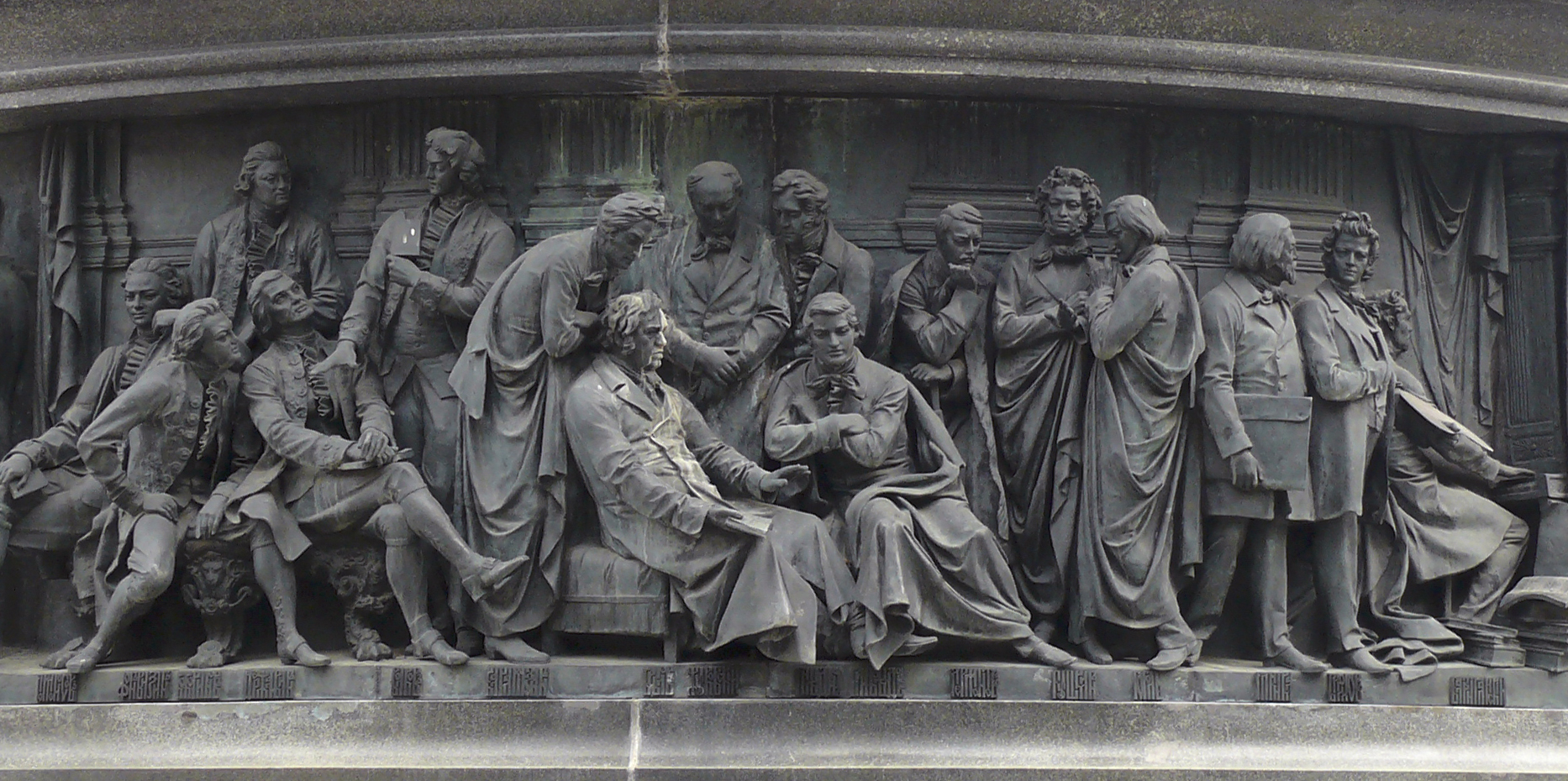
Artists

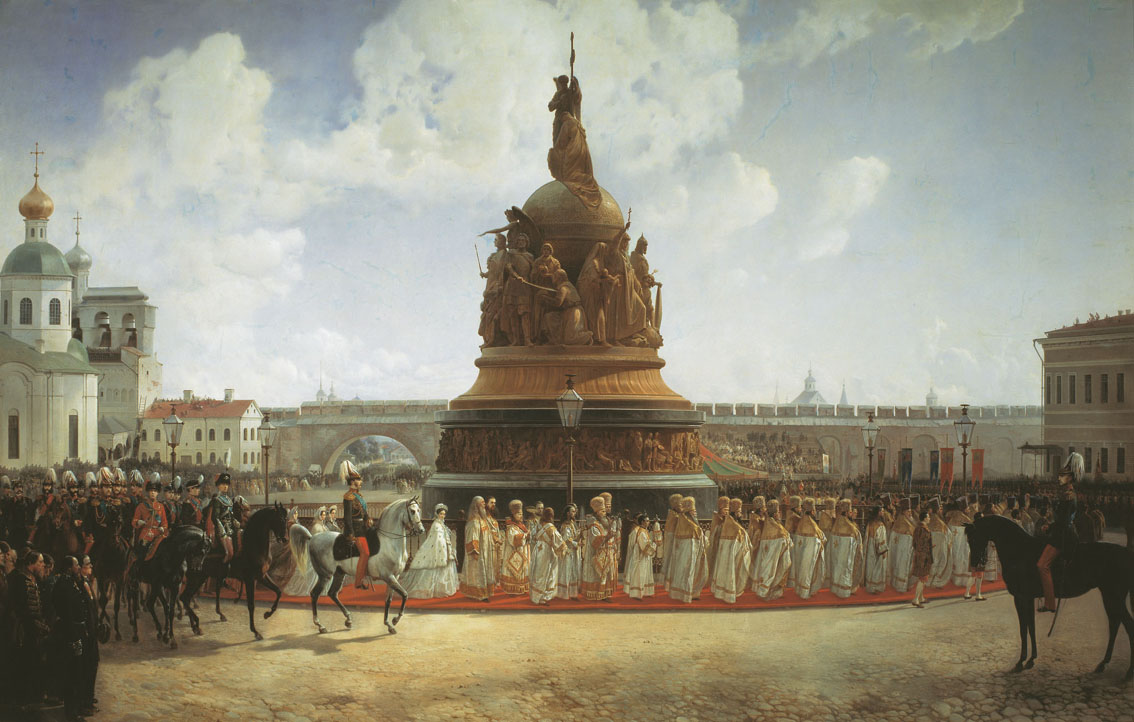
Opening of the monument in 1862 by Bogdan Willewalde

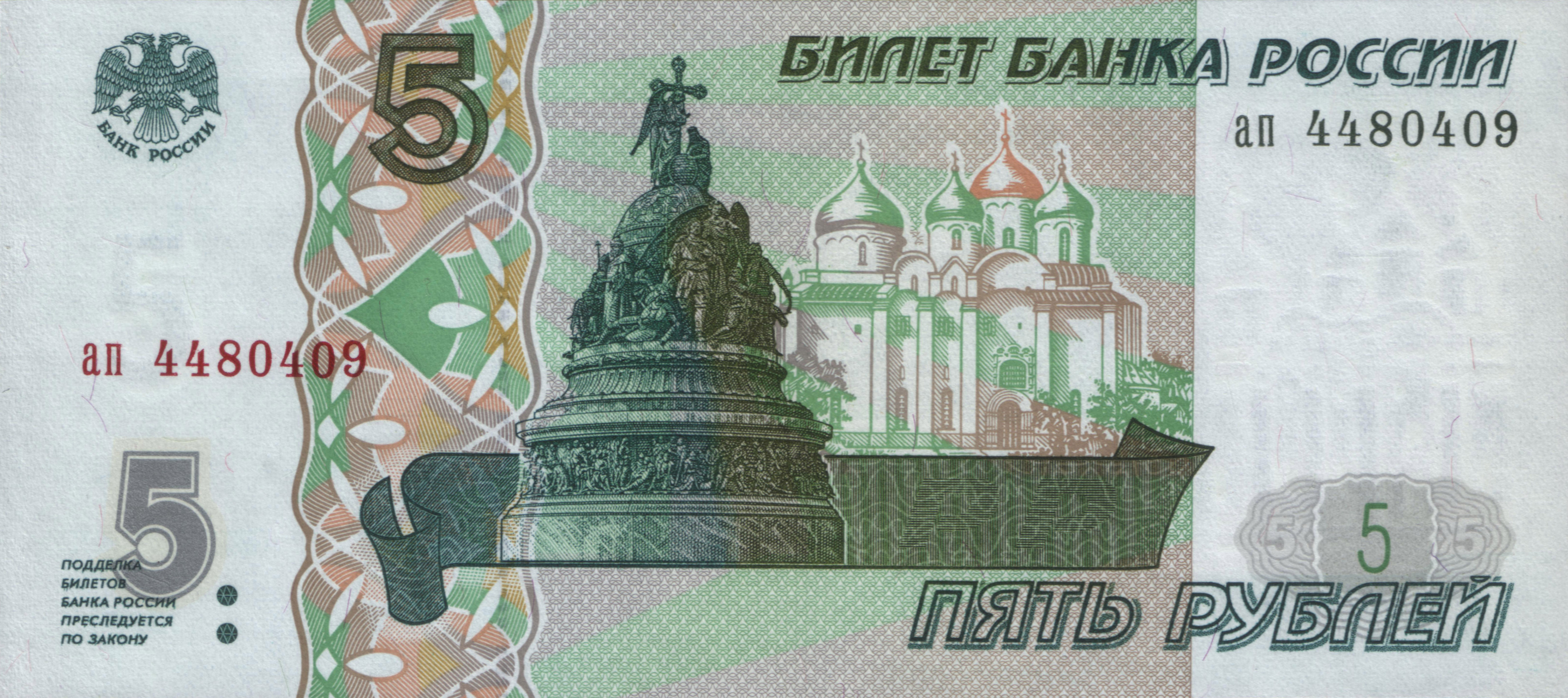
Millennium of Russia on a 5-ruble banknote, 1997–2001

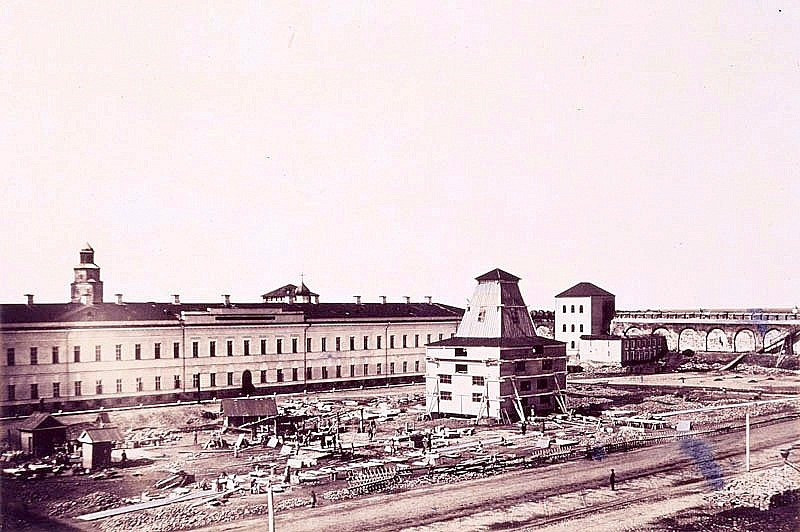
The construction of the monument in 1862.

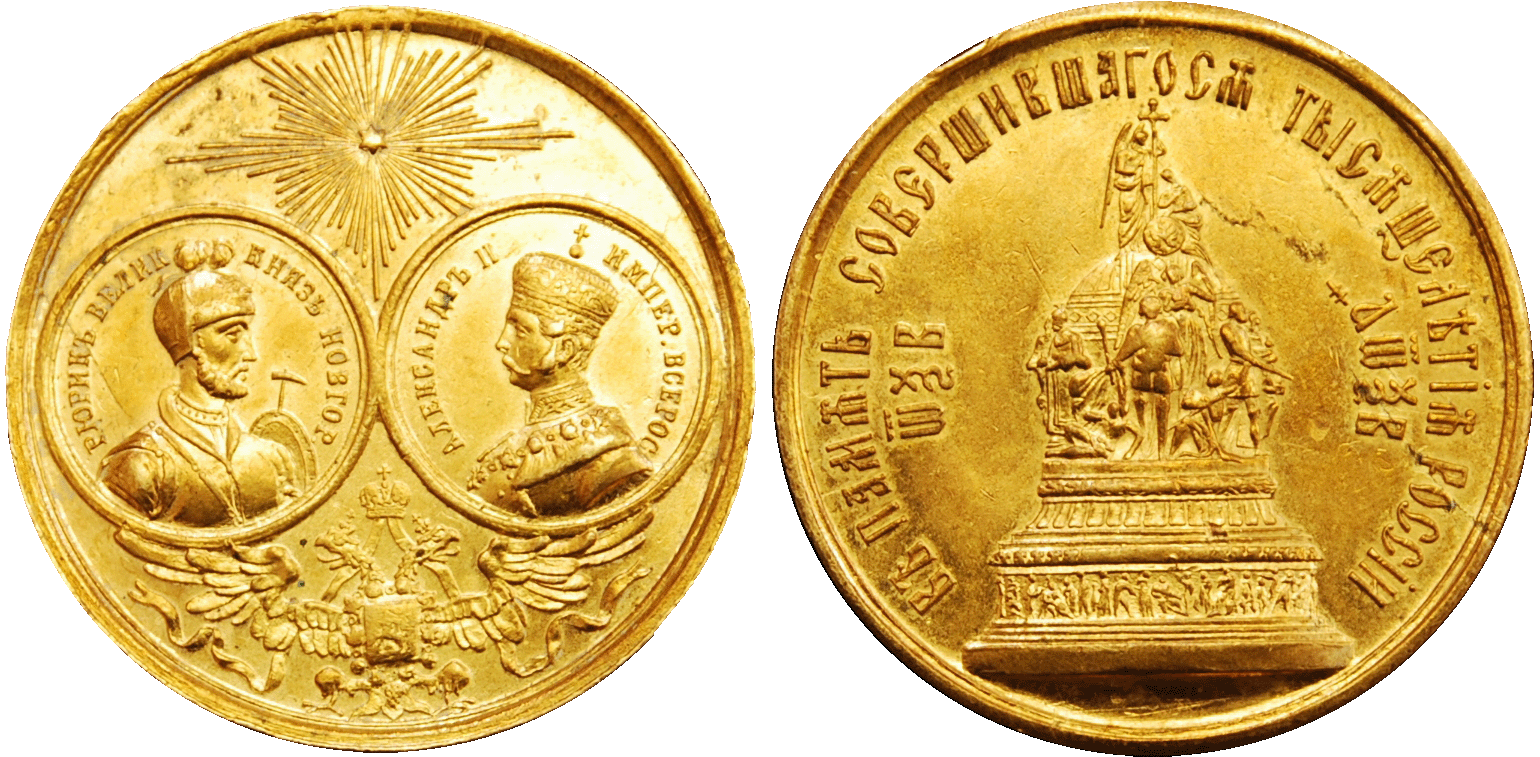
The Commemorative medal of the monument in 1862 when the construction was finished, "In memory of the Millennium of Russia"
