= Kleanthis =

Kleanthis is both a Greek masculine given name and surname. Notable people with the name include:

== Given name ==
- Kleanthis Bargkas (born 1978), Greek cyclist
- Kleanthis Ierissiotis (born 1953), Greek hammer thrower
- Kleanthis Palaiologos (1902–1990), Greek coach and author
- Kleanthis Triantafyllos (1850–1889), Greek writer
- Kleanthis Vikelidis (1915–1998), Greek footballer

== Surname ==
- Stamatios Kleanthis (1802–1862), Greek architect
