= Triantafyllos =

Triantafyllos is both a Greek masculine given name and surname. Notable people with the name include:

== Given name ==
- Triantafyllos Macheridis (born 1973), Greek footballer
- Triantafyllos Pasalidis (born 1996), Greek footballer
- Triantafyllos Siaperas (1932–1994), Greek chess player
- Saint Triantaphyllos (1663–1680), Greek saint
- Triantafyllos Tsapras (born 2001), Greek footballer
- Triantafyllos Tsongas (born 1938), Greek rower

== Surname ==
- Kleanthis Triantafyllos (1850–1889), Greek writer
- Yves Triantafyllos (born 1948), French footballer
