= Mikhail Mikeshin =

Russian sculptor (1835–1896)

- Михаил Микешин
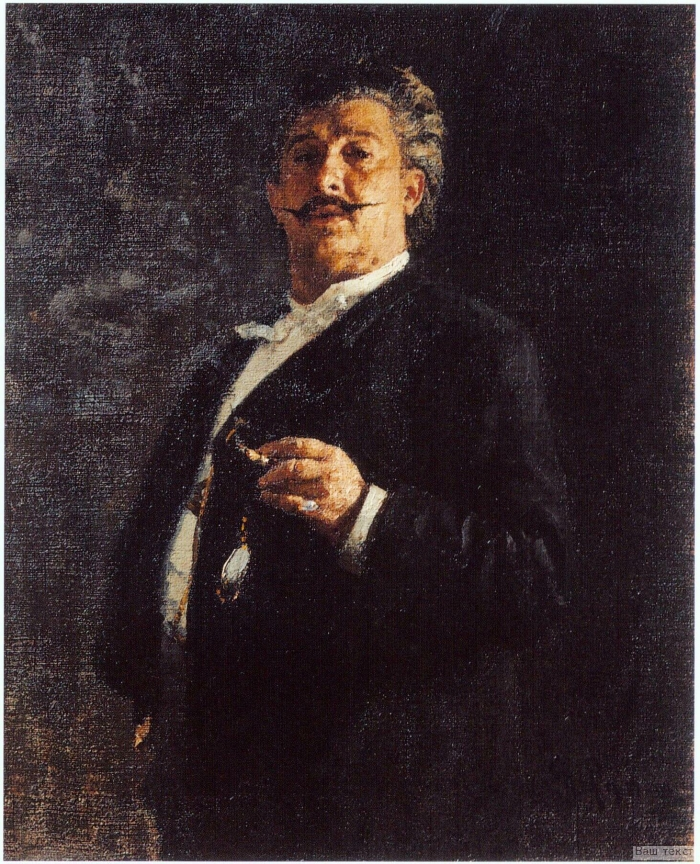
- Portrait by Ilya Repin, oil on canvas; Tretyakov Gallery, Moscow (1888)
- Born: 9 February 1835; Staroye Maximkovo, Roslavlsky Uyezd, Smolensk Governorate, Russian Empire
- Died: 19 January 1896 (aged 60); Saint Petersburg, Russian Empire
- Resting place: Nikolskoe Cemetery, Saint Petersburg
- Education: Imperial Academy of Arts (1858)
- Known for: Sculpture
- Notable work: Millennium of Russia, 1859–1862
- Awards: Big Gold Medal of the Imperial Academy of Arts (1858)
- Elected: Member Academy of Arts (1869)

Mikhail Osipovich Mikeshin (Russian: Михаи́л О́сипович Микéшин; 9 February 1835 – 19 January 1896) was a Russian painter and sculpture enthusiast who regularly worked for the Romanov family and designed a number of outdoor statues in the major cities of the Russian Empire.

== Biography ==
Mikeshin was born on 21 February 1835 in a village near Roslavl. When he attended the Imperial Academy of Arts in 1852–58, his Romantic treatment of patriotic themes won him the admiration of the Russian royalty and he was asked to teach drawing to the Grand Duchesses.

Although his forte was battle painting, Mikeshin's sketch won the much-publicized contest for the monument to the Millennium of Russia in 1859. Henceforward, commissions were plentiful. He illustrated the official motto Orthodoxy, Autocracy, and Nationality in designs for bombastic outdoor statues of Kuzma Minin in Nizhny Novgorod, Admiral Greig in Nikolayev, and Alexander II of Russia in Rostov-on-Don.

Only a few of Mikeshin's outdoor monuments survived the Soviet years. These include the statues of Catherine the Great in Saint Petersburg (1873), Bohdan Khmelnytsky in Kiev (1888), and Yermak in Novocherkassk (1904). He also won competitions to erect monuments abroad, e.g., the statue of Pedro IV in Lisbon.

The Khmelnytsky monument was at the center of controversy, as the original version would have depicted the 17th-century Cossack leader trampling a Pole, a Jew, and a Catholic priest under the hooves of the horse. This xenophobic element was removed in the monument as finally erected.

In 1876–1878, Mikeshin was the editor of Pchela, a satirical magazine in which he published his caricatures and illustrations to the works of Nikolai Gogol and Taras Shevchenko. He died on 31 January 1896 in Saint Petersburg.

== Works ==
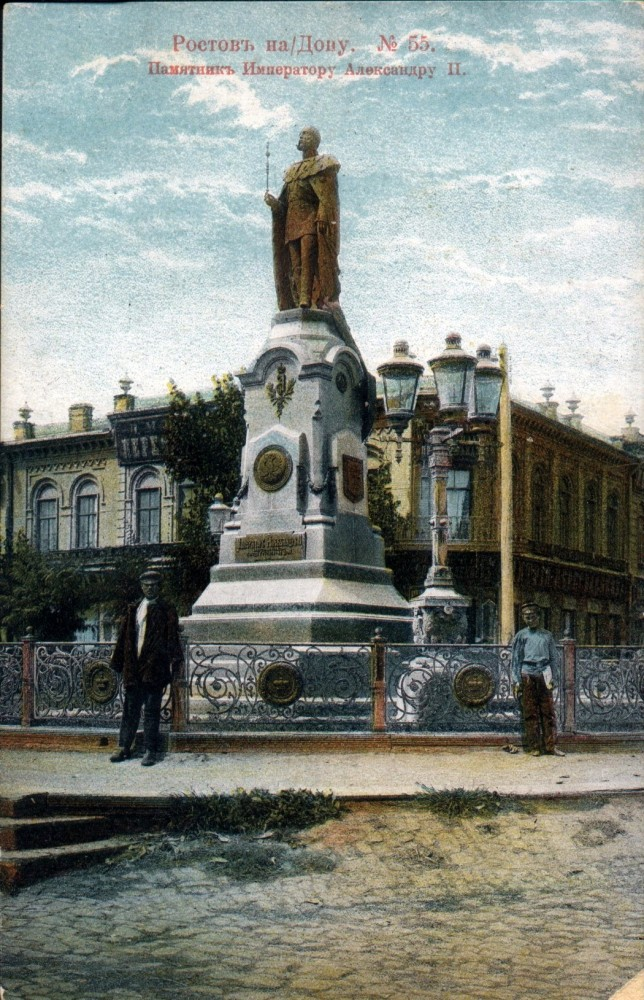
Monument to Alexander II (Rostov-on-Don)

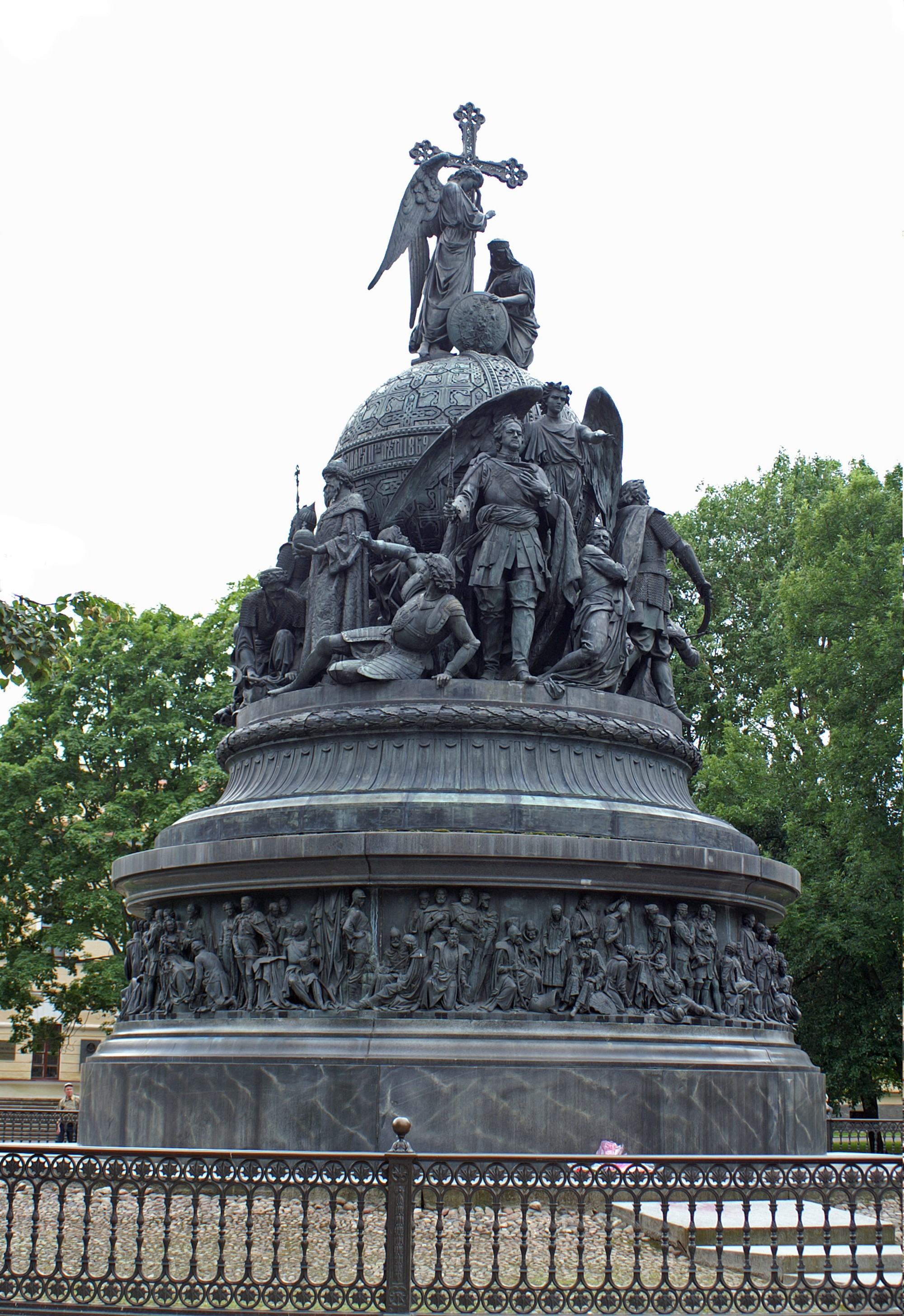
Monument Millennium of Russia (Veliky Novgorod)

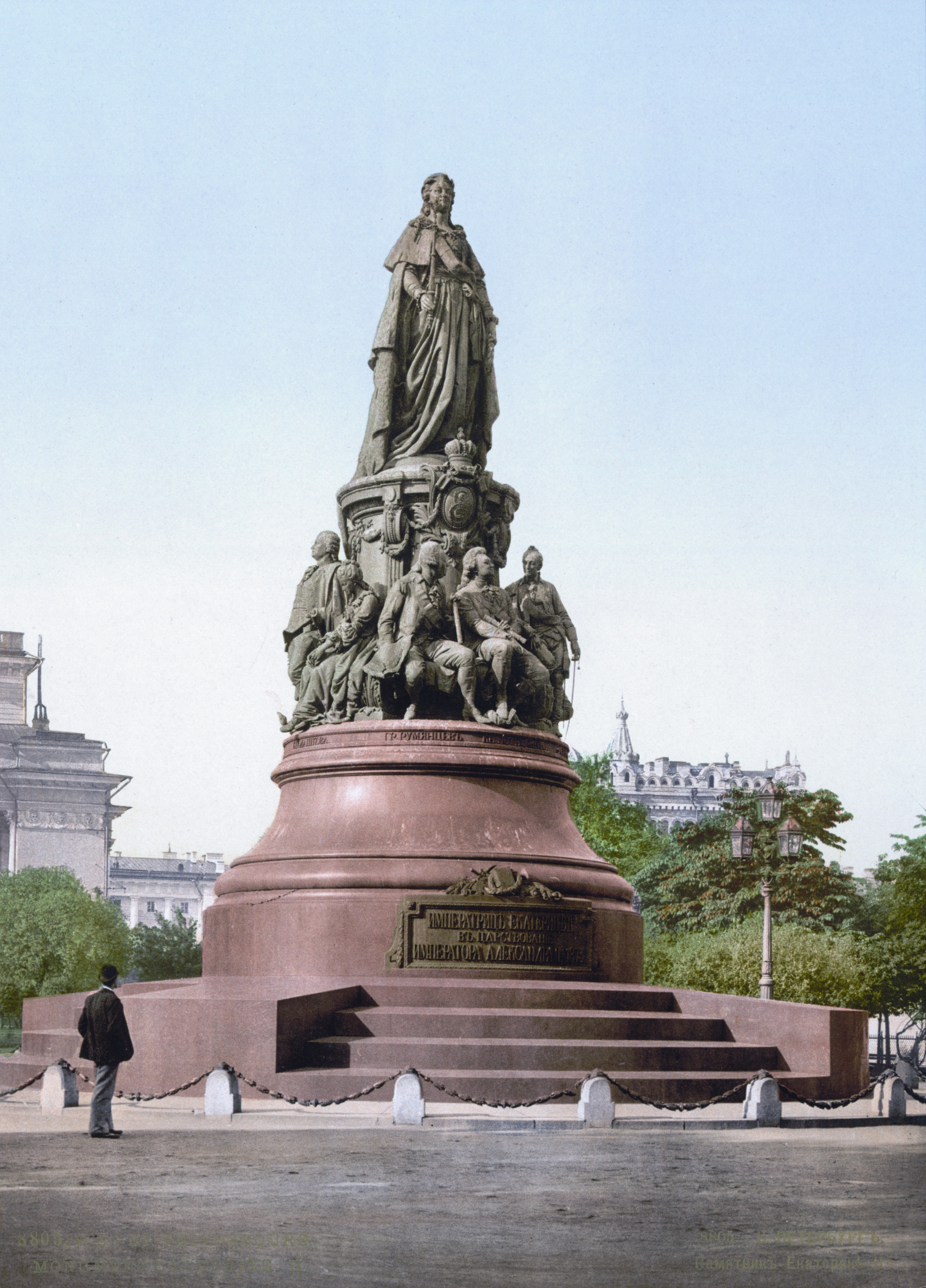
Monument to Catherine II
(Saint Petersburg)

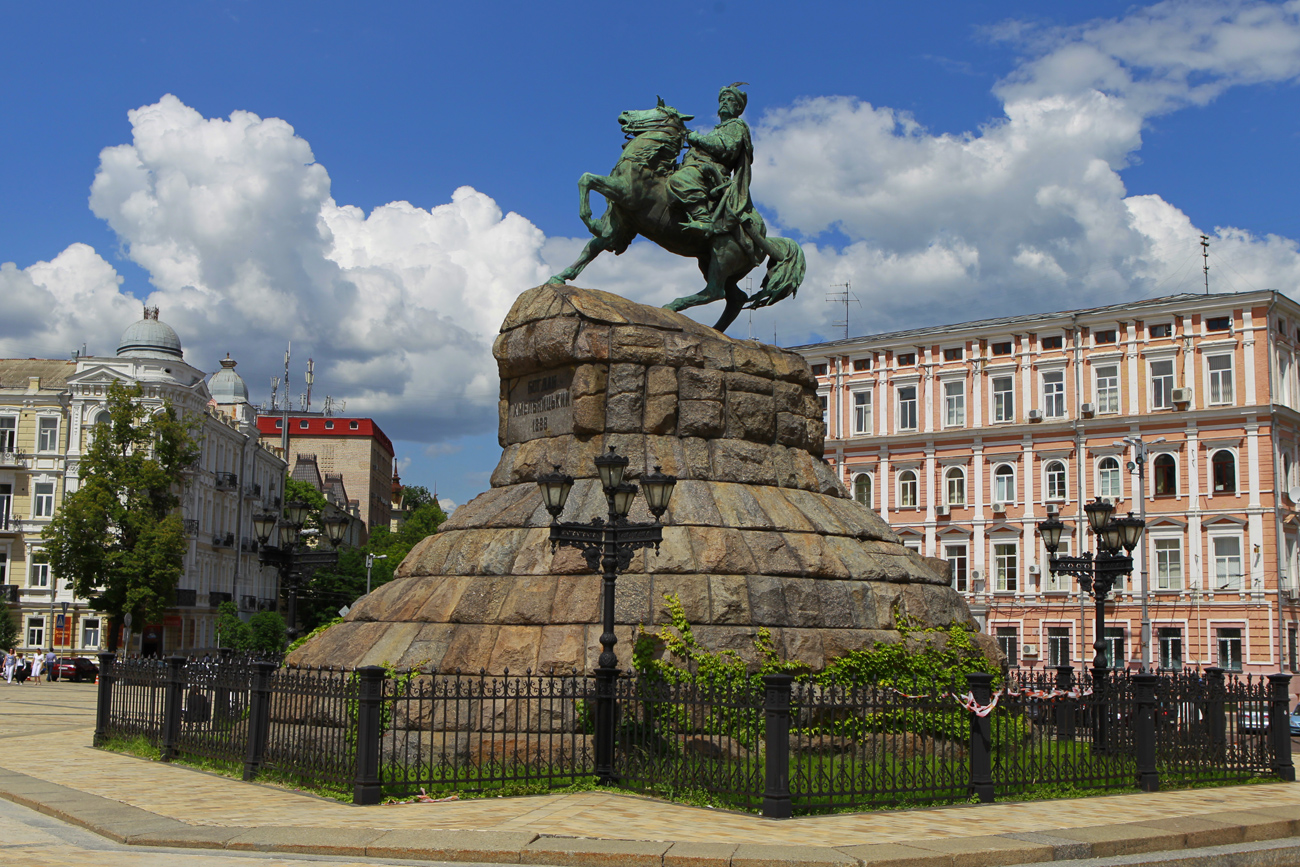
Monument to Bohdan Khmelnytsky (Kyiv)
