= Kleanthis Palaiologos =

Greek coach and author (1902–1990)

Kleanthis Palaiologos Κλεάνθης Παλαιολόγος
- Born: 11 September 1902; Athens, Greece
- Died: 25 August 1990 (age 87)
- Children: Angelos Palaiologos
- Father: Papa-Hastas

Kleanthis Palaiologos (11 September 1902 – 25 August 1990) was a Greek coach and writer. Βorn in 1902 in Athens and grew up in Mytilene. His father was called papa-Hastas or papa-Palaiologos and was a priest. He was for 15 years a member of SEGAS, the Hellenic Olympic Committee, as well as founding member and vice president of the International Olympic Academy. Palaiologos was honored by the Greek state with the Order of the Phoenix.

Kleanthis Palaiologos was an author heavily inspired by the Olympic games and the Olympic spirit.

He died on 25 August 1990.
