= Barlaam of Chikoy =

Russian Orthodox hermit and priest

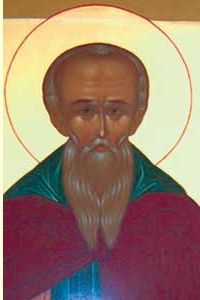
Varlaam's icon

Barlaam of Chikoy (Russian: Варлаам Чикойский - Varlaam Chikoysky, secular name Vasily Fedotovich Nadezhin, Василий Федотович Надежин; 1774 in village Meresevo, Lukyanovsky uezd, Nizhny Novgorod Governorate – January 23, 1846, in Urluk volost), was a Russian Orthodox Church hermit and celibate priest famous for his missionary activities in Transbaikal, the founder of John the Precursor's secluded monastery in the Chikoy Mounts. He is venerated as a local saint.

Born in the Maresevo village of the Nizhny Novgorod Governorate in a peasant family, Vasily married at the insistence of parents. The marriage was childless and Vasily in 1811 went on a pilgrimage to the Kiev Pechersk Lavra. Passportless, he was arrested for vagrancy and exiled to Siberia. He began to wander, and in 1814 reached Irkutsk, and in 1820 came to the slopes of the Chikokon Range and built a monastic cell near Urluk, becoming a hermit. Soon other people joined him and the brethren of the future Chikoy Monastery formed.

In 1828, Vasily accepted monastic tonsure with the name Varlaam (in honor of the Monk Barlaam of Kiev) and in 1830 was ordained a hieromonk. In 1839, Varlaam was elevated to the rank of hegumen of the John the Baptist Monastery he founded. Under him, monastery churches were built, and missionary work among the local population began. In 1845, he was awarded the Most Holy Synod by a gold pectoral cross.

He died in 1846, was buried on the south side of the altar of the chapel in honor of the icon of "All Who Mourn, Joy" of the John the Baptist Church of the monastery he founded. Soon after his death, miracles were attributed to him and at the end of the 19th century he was glorified as a locally revered saint. The life of the Monk Varlaam was written by St. Meletius (Yakimov).

== Sources ==
- The Encyclopedia of Zabaykalie
