= Herman of Solovki =

Russian hermit and saint (died 1479)

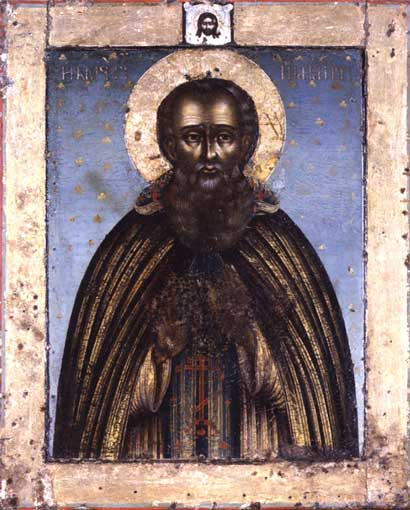
The icon of Herman of Solovki

Herman of Solovki (Russian: Герман Соловецкий; died 1479) was a Russian hermit. He was one of the founders of the Solovetsky Monastery. In total, he lived in Solovetsky Islands, at the time, the most remote location, for about 50 years.

== Life ==
In 1429, Herman, who was presumably of Karelian origin, met a monk, Sabbatius, who previously settled near a chapel on the Vyg River. They were both looking for a desolate place, to avoid the crowds. They sailed together to Solovetsky Islands, where they lived as hermits. In 1435 Savvatiy died, and Herman returned to the continent, where in 1436 he met Zosima. Together with Zosima, he returned to the islands, and, when eventually the monks started to arrive there, Solovetsky Monastery was founded. Zosima eventually became the hegumen of the monastery, which was subordinate to the Eparchy of Novgorod.

In 1479, after the death of Zosima, the new hegumen, Arseniy, sent Herman to Novgorod. Herman died in Novgorod at the same year, and his relics were to be moved back to Solovetsky Monastery. However, the monks did not manage to do it during the season, and buried Herman on Svir River. In 1484, the relics were transferred to Solovetsky Monastery.

Since 1692, Herman has been venerated as a saint by the Russian Orthodox Church. His feast days are O.S. 30 July (12 August) and O.S. 8 (21) August (translation of the relics).
