= Solovetsky Monastery =

Fortified monastery on the Solovetsky Islands, Russia

- Солове́цкий монасты́рь
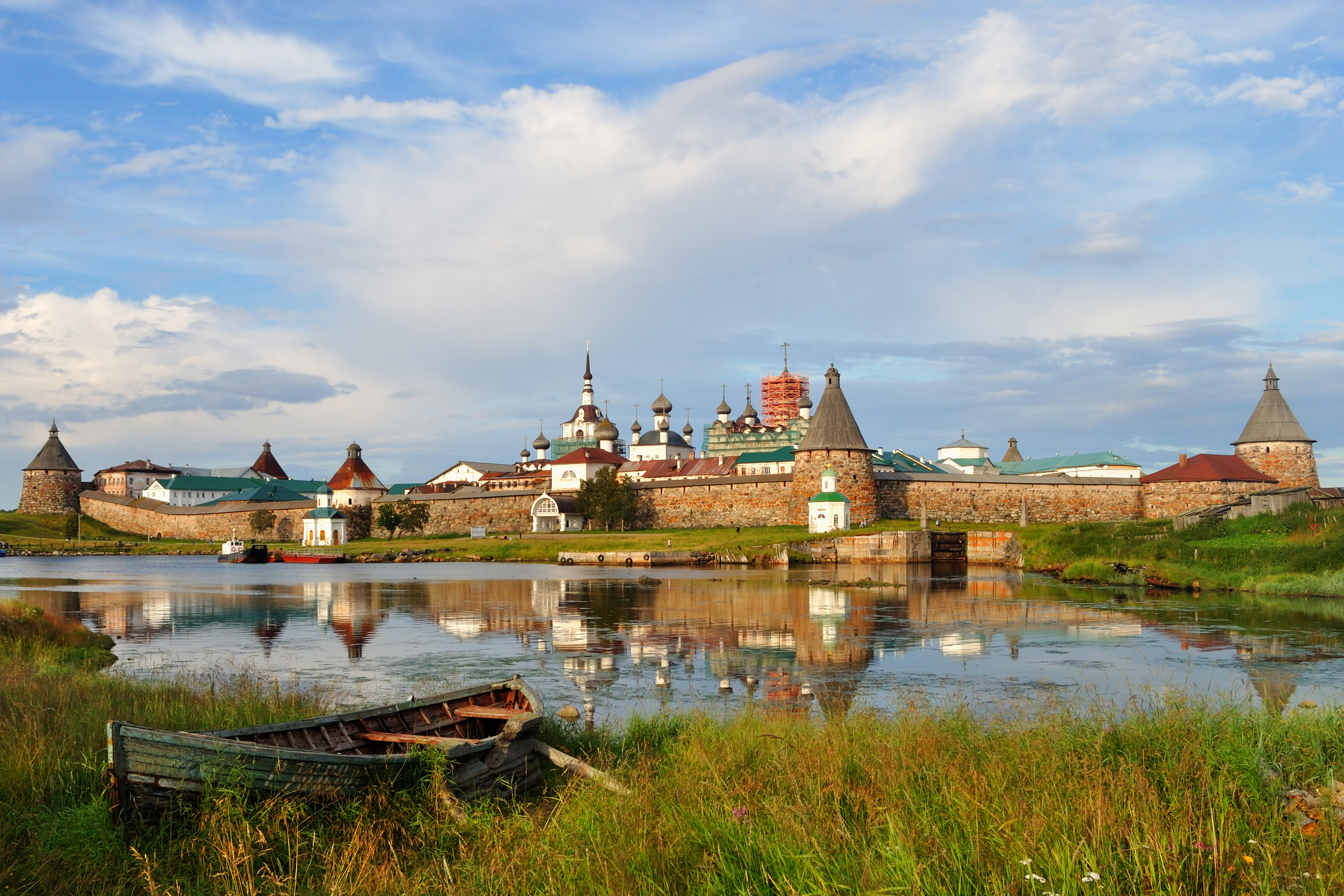
- Interactive map of Solovetsky Monastery

Monastery information
- Order: Russian Orthodox Church
- Established: 1436
- Disestablished: c. 1917
- Reestablished: 1990s

People
- Founder: Zosimas of Solovki
- Important associated figures: Herman of Solovki, Savvatiy

Site
- Location: Onega Bay, Solovetsky District, Arkhangelsk Oblast, Russia
- Coordinates: 65°01′28″N 35°42′38″E
- Public access: Yes

UNESCO World Heritage Site
- Criteria: Cultural: iv
- Reference: 632
- Inscription: 1992 (16th Session)

The Solovetsky Monastery (Russian: Солове́цкий монасты́рь, IPA: [səlɐˈvʲɛtskʲɪj mənɐˈstɨrʲ]) is a fortified monastery located on the Solovetsky Islands in the White Sea in northern Russia. It was one of the largest Christian citadels in northern Russia before it was became a Soviet prison and labor camp from 1926 to 1939, and it served as a prototype for the camps of the Gulag system. The monastery has experienced several major changes and military sieges. Its most important structures date from the 16th century, when Filip Kolychev was its hegumen (comparable to an abbot).

== History ==
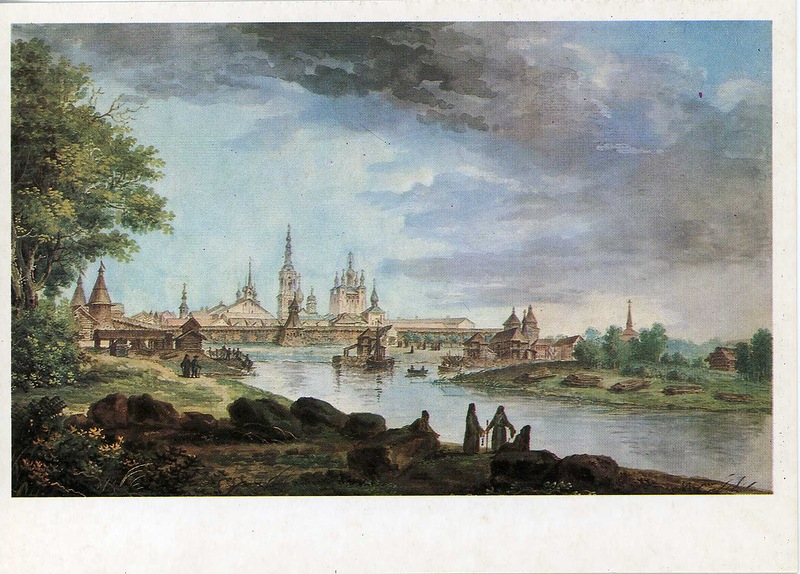
The monastery in the 1780s.

The Solovetsky Monastery was founded in 1436 by the monk Zosima; however, monks Herman and Savvatiy from the Kirillo-Belozersky Monastery lived on the island from 1429 to 1436, and are considered to be co-founders of the monastery. Zosima later became the first hegumen of the monastery. After Marfa Boretskaya, wife of the posadnik of Novgorod, donated her lands at Kem and Summa to the monastery in 1450, the monastery quickly enlarged its holdings, which was situated strategically on the shores of the White Sea.

In the 15th and 16th centuries, the monastery extended its commercial activities, becoming an economic and political center of the White Sea region. This included saltworks (in the 1660s, it owned 54 of them), trapping, fishing, mica works, ironworks, pearl works, among others. Archmandrites of the monastery were appointed by the tsar himself and the patriarch.

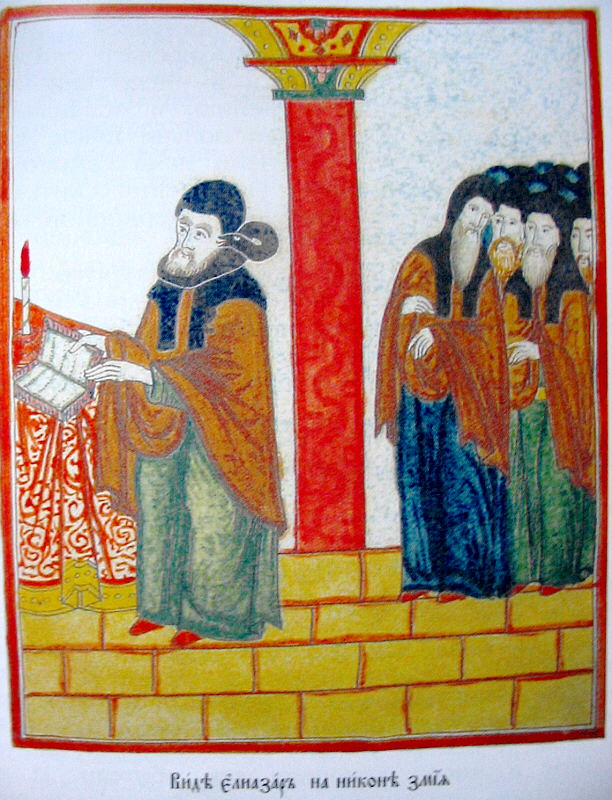
Saint Eleazar of Anzersky (unknown – January 13/23, 1656) has a vision of the future Patriarch Nikon's omophorion becoming a snake. After Nikon started criticizing the brotherhood, Eleazar subsequently banished Nikon from the monastery (which would soon become an Old Believer stronghold).

By the 17th century, the Solovetsky Monastery had about 350 monks, 600–700 servants, artisans and peasants. In the 1650s and 1660s, the monastery was one of the strongholds of the Old Believers of the Raskol (schism) in the Russian Orthodox Church. The Solovetsky Monastery Uprising of 1668–1676 was aimed at Patriarch Nikon's ecclesiastic reform and took on an anti-feudal nature. In 1765, the monastery became stauropegic (from the Greek stauros meaning "cross" and pegio meaning "to affirm"), i.e. it was subordinated directly to the Synod.

Together with the Sumskoy and Kemsky stockades, the Solovetsky Monastery served as an important frontier fortress with dozens of cannons and a strong garrison. In the 16th to 17th centuries, the monastery succeeded a number of times in repelling the attacks of the Livonian Order and the Swedes (in 1571, 1582 and 1611).

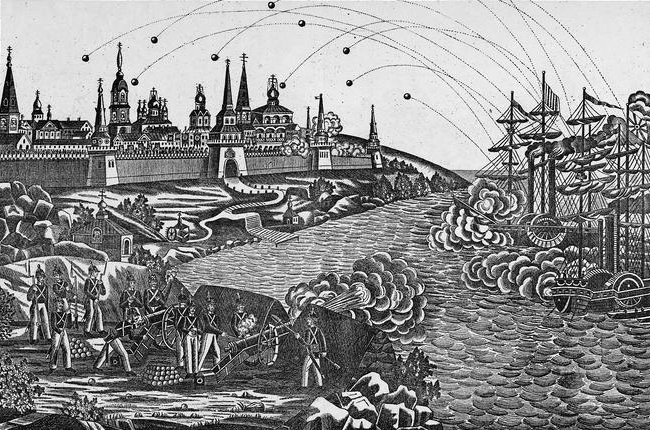
"Bombardment of the Solovetsky Monastery by the English Navy". A lubok (popular print) from 1868

During the Crimean War, the Solovetsky Monastery was attacked by three British ships. After nine hours of shelling on the 6 and 7 July 1854 the vessels left with nothing.

Between the 16th and the early 20th centuries, the monastery was also a place of exile for the opponents of autocracy and official Orthodoxy and a center of Christianization in the north of Russia. The monastery also had a large library of manuscripts and books.

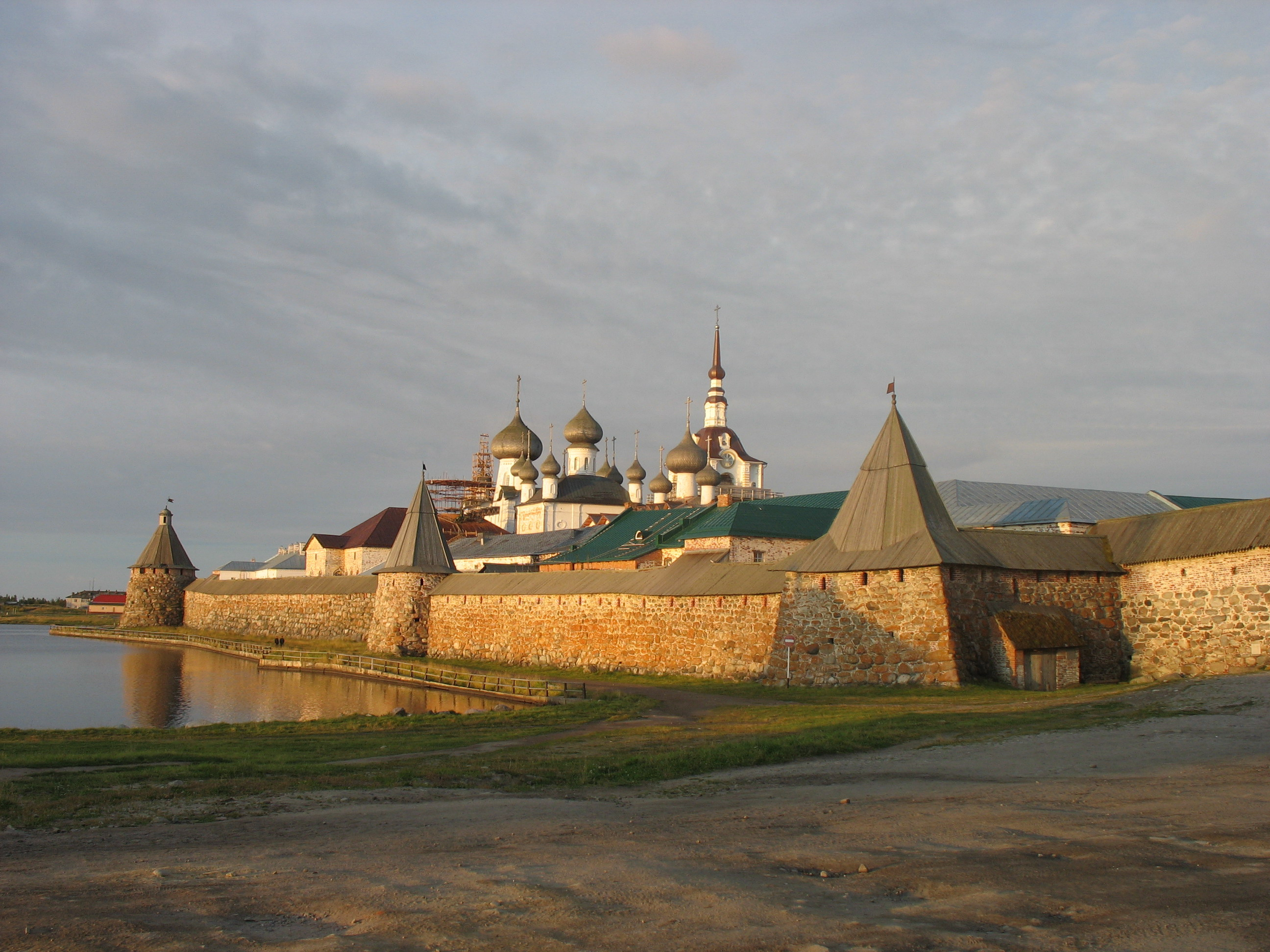
The monastery in August 2009.

The monastery garden also had some exotic flora, such as the Tibetan wild roses presented to the monks by Agvan Dorzhiev, a Lama.

After the Bolshevik Revolution and Russian Civil War, the Soviet authorities closed down the monastery and incorporated many of the buildings into Solovki prison camp, one of the earliest forced-labor camps of the gulag during the 1920s and 1930s. "In the earliest years of the Soviet prison system, the Solovetsky Special Prison Camp (SLON) was home to a large group of . . . imprisoned writers." The camp main activity was logging, and when most of the surrounding area had been deforested, the camp was closed. Before the Second World War, a naval cadet school was opened on the island.

A small brotherhood of monks has re-established activities in the monastery after the collapse of communism, and it currently houses about ten monks. The monastery has also recently been extensively repaired, but remains under reconstruction. The Solovetsky Monastery is also an historical and architectural museum. It was one of the first Russian sites to have been inscribed in the UNESCO World Heritage List.

== Layout ==
The Solovetsky Monastery is located on the shores of the Prosperity Bay (бухта Благополучия) on Solovetsky Island. The monastery is surrounded by massive wall 8 to 11 meters high and 4 to 6 meters thick. The wall incorporates 7 gates and 8 towers (built in 1584–1594 by an architect named Trifon), made mainly of huge boulders up to several tonnes of weight. There are also religious buildings on the monastery's grounds with the principal structures interconnected with roofed and arched passages. They are in turn surrounded by multiple household buildings and living quarters, including a refectory (a 500 m² chamber) with the Uspensky Cathedral (built in 1552–1557), Preobrazhensky Cathedral (1556–1564), Church of Annunciation (1596–1601), stone chambers (1615), watermill (early 17th century), bell tower (1777), and Church of Nicholas (1834).

== Bibliography ==
- Brumfield, William. Solovki: Architectural Heritage in Photographs (Moscow: Tri Kvadrata, 2008) ASIN B002P5OP1I OCLC 255613915 (in English and in Russian)
