= Zosimas of Solovki =

Russian Orthodox monk and saint (died 1478)

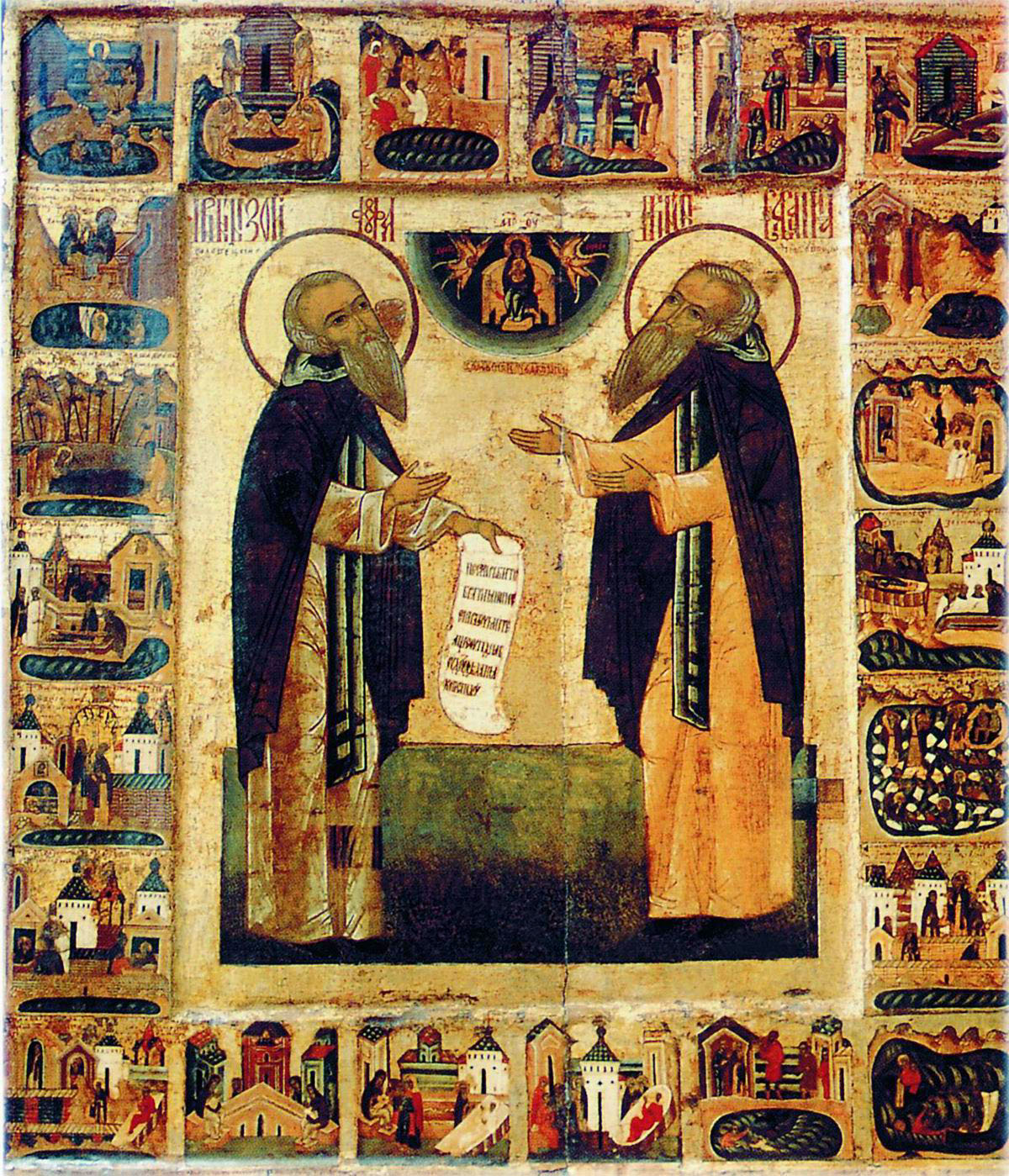
Saints Zosima (left) and Savvatiy (right) with their lives. The 16th century icon is now located in the Russian Museum in Saint-Petersburg, Russia

Zosimas of Solovki (Russian: Зосима Соловецкий; died 1478) was a Russian hermit. He was one of the founders of the Solovetsky Monastery, which was established on the Solovetsky Islands in the White Sea of northern Russia. He is venerated as a saint by the Russian Orthodox Church.

== Life ==
The origin of Zosima is not exactly clear. By 1436, his parents were both dead, and he decided to live as a hermit. In the mouth of the Suma River, he met Herman, a monk, who previously spent several years with Savvatiy on Bolshoy Solovetsky Island. Savvatiy died in 1435, and Herman returned to the continent. Zosima and Herman traveled again to Solovetsky Islands, and soon monks started to arrive there. These monks considered themselves the disciples of Zosima. Soon he had to build a wooden church and to organize the monks into a monastery. The monastery was subordinate to Eparchy of Novgorod. The bishop of Novgorod, Iona, twice appointed hegumens to the monastery, but these hegumens left without being able to bear the conditions of life in a Northern island. Then he appointed Zosima as a hegumen.

In 1465, Zosima built a new church and transferred the relics of Savvatiy to this church. He died on April 17, 1478. Already during his tenure, Solovetsky Monastery obtained big investments from Novgorod Republic and established itself as one of the richest monasteries in Russia.

== Veneration ==
Since 1547, Zosima has been venerated as a saint by the Russian Orthodox Church.

Zosima is commemorated with a feast day on August 8th.

== Sources ==
- "Зосима, основатель Соловецкого монастыря" . Brockhaus and Efron Encyclopedic Dictionary (in Russian). 1906.
