= Kleanthis Triantafyllos =

- Κλεάνθης Τριαντάφυλλος
- Born: 1850; Apollonia, Sifnos
- Died: May 25, 1889 (aged 38–39)
- Occupations: Teacher, journalist, poet

Kleanthis Triantafyllos (1850 - May 25, 1889) was a Greek satirical poet and journalist.

== Biography ==
He was born in Apollonia, Sifnos in 1850. He studied to be a teacher, like his father, and was appointed to Andros. There he learned French and translated French poems, such as Lamartine's Despair. He then went to Constantinople, where he collaborated with the publications Neologos, Koudounatos, Salpix and Diogenes. There he also published a poetry collection anonymously. He was persecuted by the Ottoman authorities for his satiric style and fled to Athens. In 1878, together with Vlasis Gavrielidis, he founded the progressive political and satirical magazine Rabagas, based on a comedy of the same name by Victorien Sardou, which at the time had been translated by Ioannis Kambouroglou, but had been banned by the Koumoundourou government. From the name of the magazine Cleanthis Triantafyllos became known with the nickname "Rabagas".

The magazine provoked reactions and led to the imprisonment of its editors. Its publication, however, continued. In 1881, he was the victim of an assassination attempt. After an eight-month break due to financial problems, in 1887 he continued the publication of Rabagas in collaboration with Roccos Choidas. Choidas published two articles that were considered insulting to the king and for this they were both imprisoned. Triantafyllos was released after six months and on May 25, 1889, he committed suicide. In the last years of his life he suffered from a serious mental disorder.

Besides his work in Rabagas magazine, he translated works of Pierre-Jean de Béranger.
