= Sabbatius of Solovki =

Russian monk and saint (died 1435)

Saint Sabbatius of Solovki
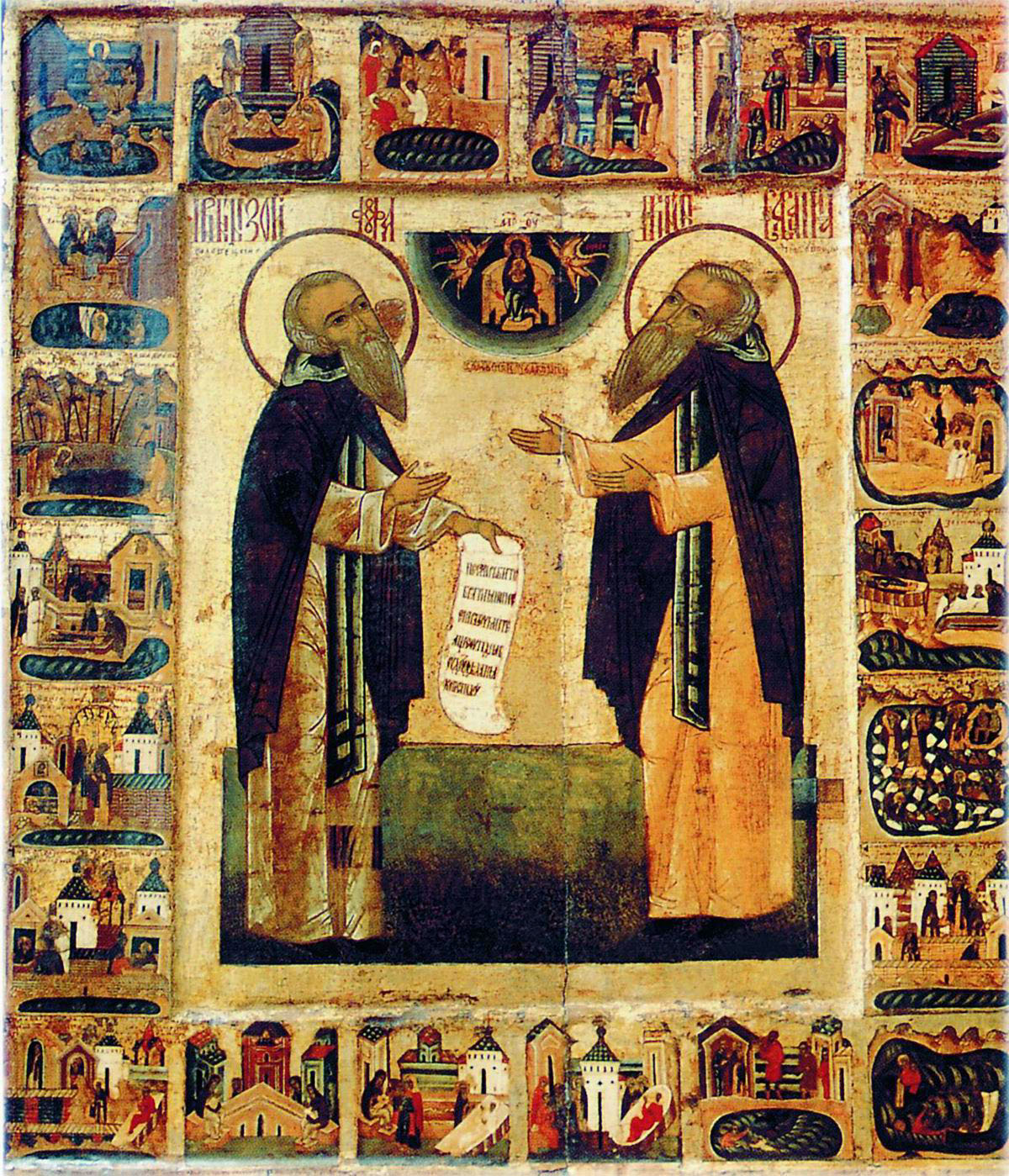
- Saints Zosimas (left) and Sabbatius (right) with their lives. The 16th century icon is now located in the Russian Museum, St. Petersburg, Russia.

Venerable Wonderworker of Solovki
- Died: 27 September 1435
- Honored in: Eastern Orthodox Church
- Canonized: 1547
- Feast: 27 September; 8 August (translation of relics)

Saint Sabbatius of Solovki (Russian: Савватий Соловецкий, romanized: Savvaty Solovetsky; died 27 September 1435) was a Russian monk. He was one of the founders of the Solovetsky Monastery, along with Saint Zosimas of Solovki. He was canonized as a saint by the Russian Orthodox Church.

== Life ==
Sabbatius was a monk at Kirillo-Belozersky Monastery. Searching for an even more secluded place for complete solitude and silent prayer, he found out that there was a large deserted island in the White Sea.

He heard of Valaam Monastery on the Lake Ladoga and its monks, who had been leading an austere lifestyle. In 1429, Sabbatius moved to this island. Sabbatius settled near a chapel on the Vyg River. There, he met a monk by the name of German (Herman), who had lived in the woods in solitude. German agreed to accompany Sabbatius on his voyage to the island and stay there with him. When they reached the island, they erected a cross and a hermit's cell some 13 km from today's Solovetsky Monastery. After Sabbatius's death, newly arrived monks began the construction of the monastery which would come to be known as Solovetsky.

== Veneration ==
Since 1547, Sabbatius has been venerated as a saint by the Russian Orthodox Church and the wider Eastern Orthodox Church. His feast day is on 27 September and he is also remembered on 8 August along with Saint Zosimas, when their relics were translated on that day in 1566 into a church named in their honour.
