= Turf maze =

Labyrinth made by cutting a path into turf

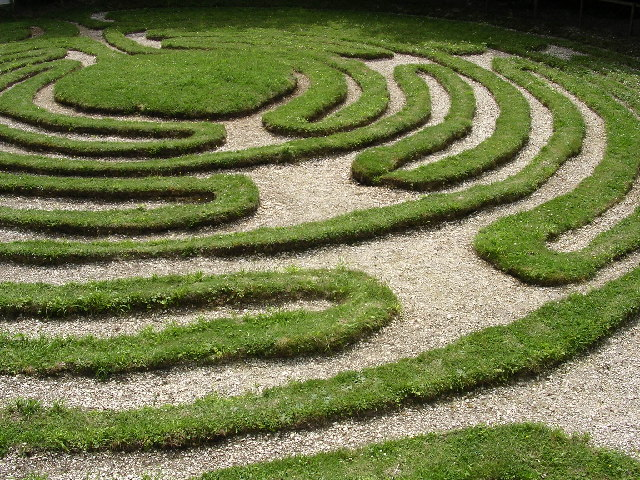
Breamore Mizmaze, Hampshire, England

Historically, a turf maze is a labyrinth made by cutting a convoluted path into a level area of short grass, turf or lawn. Some had names such as Mizmaze, Troy Town, The Walls of Troy, Julian's Bower, or Shepherd's Race. This is the type of maze referred to by William Shakespeare in A Midsummer Night's Dream (Act 2, Scene 2) when Titania says:

The nine men's morris is fill'd up with mud;
and the quaint mazes in the wanton green,
for lack of tread are undistinguishable.

In some turf labyrinths, the groove cut in the turf is the path to be walked (sometimes marked with bricks or gravel); more commonly the turf itself forms the raised path which is marked out by shallow channels excavated between its twists and turns.

Most British examples are based on one of two layouts: the Classical or the later, more complex Medieval type which is derived from it.

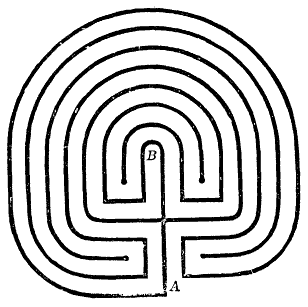
Classical labyrinth

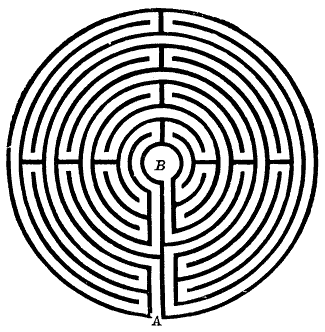
Medieval labyrinth

== Origins of the turf maze ==
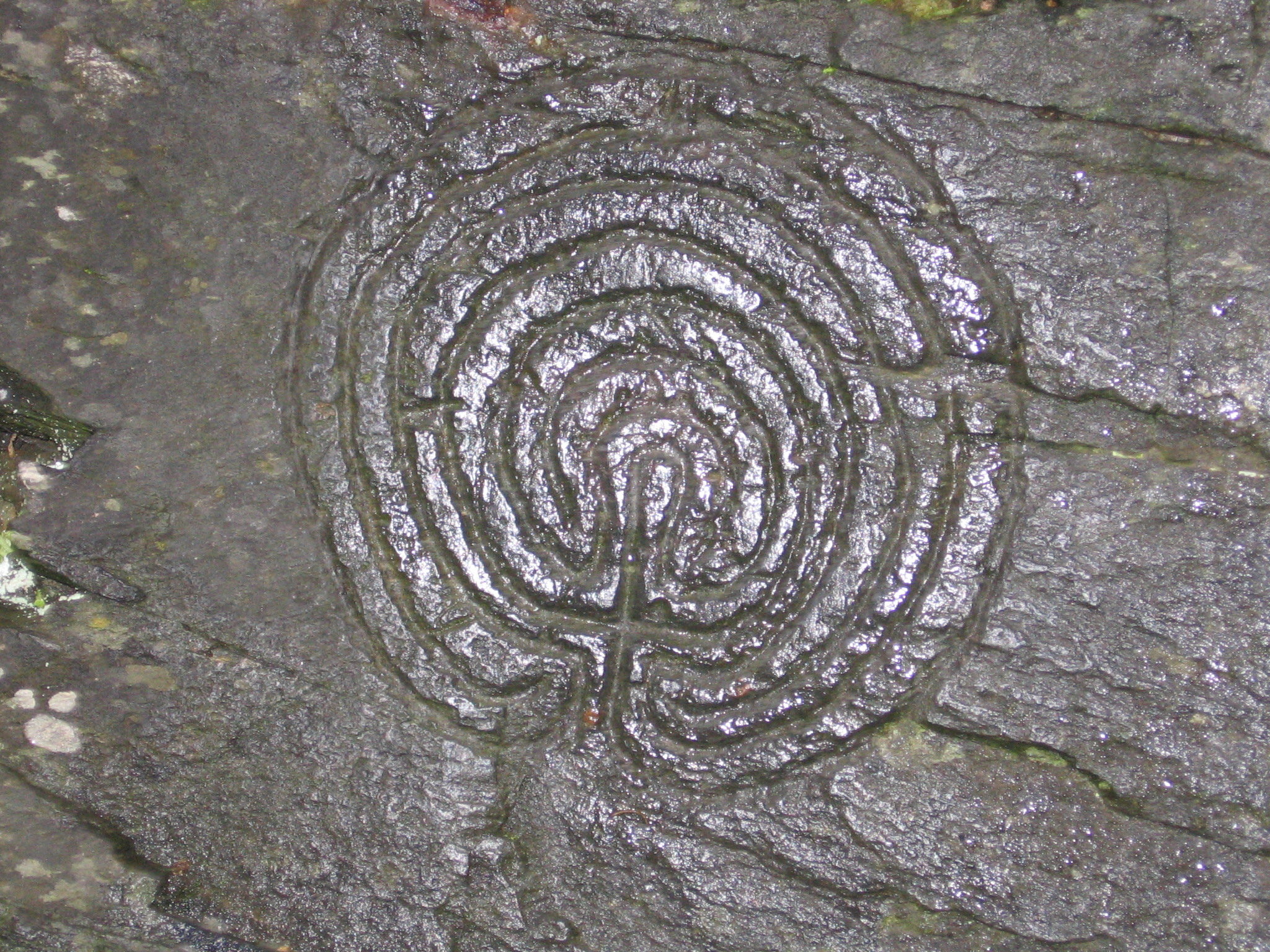
Rocky Valley carved labyrinth

The earliest known use of the classical labyrinth pattern in the British Isles is on the Hollywood Stone, an incised granite boulder from County Wicklow, Ireland, dating from c. 550 AD. There are two small classical labyrinths carved into the stone cliff face at Rocky Valley near Tintagel, Cornwall; various dates have been suggested for them, including the Bronze Age, the early 6th century and the late 17th century. The medieval pattern occurs on a carved wooden roof boss dating from the 15th century at St. Mary Redcliffe church in Bristol.

Although their patterns are clearly very ancient, there seems to be no reliable way of accurately dating a turf maze, because they have to be re-cut regularly to keep the design clear, which is liable to disturb any archaeological evidence. A maze could pre-date its earliest written record by years or even centuries.

Historically, turf mazes were confined to Northern Europe, especially England, Germany and Denmark. Hundreds of similar labyrinths still exist elsewhere in Scandinavia, Lappland, Iceland and the former Soviet Union, but their paths were normally marked out with stones, either on grass or on flat areas of bare rock. Some of these stone labyrinths are very ancient.

A revival of interest in mazes and labyrinths in the late 20th century (fuelled by a growing fascination with Earth mysteries, as well as land art and garden design), has led to the construction of new turf mazes in the United States as well as Europe; some are very large and may incorporate wild flowers or scented herbs on banks between the paths. Some modern turf mazes follow traditional labyrinth patterns; others are more inventive and incorporate religious, heraldic or other symbols appropriate to their site. Modern designs often have paved paths to keep their layouts clear and durable.

== The purpose of turf mazes ==
There has been much speculation about why turf mazes were cut and what they were used for. Because many English examples follow the same medieval pattern used for pavement mazes in cathedrals elsewhere in Europe (most notably Chartres), it is often said they were used by penitents who would follow the paths on hands and knees, but there seems to be no documentary evidence for this. Some turf maze sites were close to religious establishments such as churches or abbey but others were not.

Some mazes were on village greens and were much used for entertainment by children and youths, particularly on "high days and holidays". The maze at Alkborough was used in the early 19th century for May Eve games; at Boughton Green "treading the maze" was part of a three-day fair, held between June 24—26 near the (now-ruined) church of St John the Baptist, to mark the vigil of its patron saint.

Large turf mazes in Germany and Poland were used for processions at Whitsuntide or as part of May celebrations.

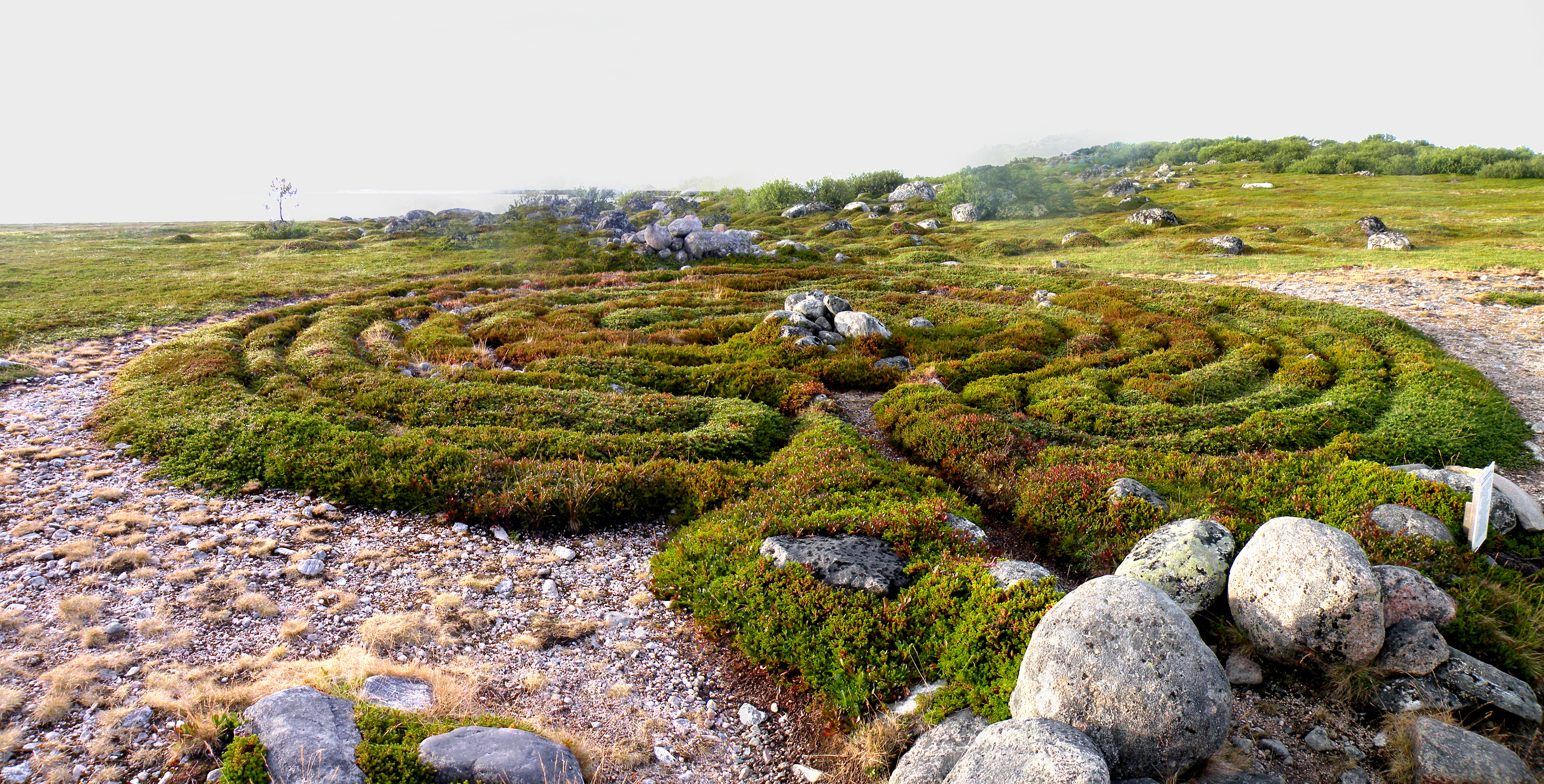
One of the mazes on Bolshoi Zayatsky Island

Many of the stone labyrinths around the Baltic coast of Sweden were built by fishermen during rough weather and were believed to entrap evil spirits, the "smågubbar" or "little people" who brought bad luck. The fishermen would walk to the centre of the labyrinth, enticing the spirits to follow them, and then run out and put to sea.

Modern turf mazes have been made for a variety of reasons. Some are private and used to aid contemplation or meditation, much as a mandala would be. Others are tourist attractions.

== Maze names ==
Several English turf mazes were called "Troy", "Troy Town" or "The Walls of Troy". In Wales, where the patterns were cut into the turf of hilltops by shepherds, they were known as "Caerdroia" (unfortunately, no historic Welsh examples survive). "Caer" means wall, rampart, castle, fort, fortress, fastness or city, and the name has been translated as "City of Troy" (or possibly "castle of turns"). In popular legend, the walls of the city of Troy were constructed in such a complex way that any enemy who entered them would be unable to find their way out. Other common maze names such as "Julian's Bower" and "St Julian's" (and corrupted versions of these) could be derived from Julius, son of Aeneas of Troy, and the word burgh, a place-name element which, like "caer", means a fortified place.

The Troy connection is also found in the names of Scandinavian stone-lined mazes of the classical labyrinth pattern: for instance, Trojaborg near Visby on the Swedish island of Gotland. In Denmark, which once had dozens of turf mazes, the name "Trojborg" or "Trelleborg" was commonly used: no historic examples survive but replicas have been made. At Grothornet, near Vartdal in the Sunnmore area of Norway there is a stone-lined labyrinth called "Den Julianske Borg" ("Julian's castle").

Some German turf maze names suggest a link with Sweden: "Schwedenhieb" (Swede's cut), "Schwedenhugel" (Swede's hill), "Schwedenring" (Swede's ring), "Schwedengang" (Swede's path). Popular legend links them with the burial places of Swedish officers during the Thirty Years' War (1618–48) but they are also widely believed to be much older.

At Stolp, in Pomerania, Poland, the "Windelbahn" ("coil-track"), a processional turf labyrinth, was used by the Shoemakers' Guild. The original was destroyed; a copy was made in 1935.

== Historic turf mazes ==
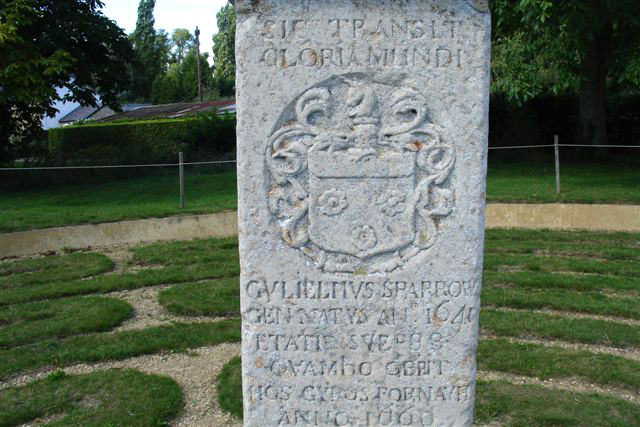
Latin inscription on the central pillar of Hilton maze, Cambridgeshire, England

=== Surviving English examples ===
As noted above, turf mazes are notoriously difficult to date, as they have to be recut periodically to keep the paths clear. Eight supposedly ancient turf mazes survive in England:

- Alkborough, North Lincolnshire: "Julian's Bower", "Gillian's Bore" or "Gilling Bore" (mentioned by Abraham de la Pryme c. 1700)
- Breamore, Hampshire: "Miz-Maze" or "Mizmaze"
- Dalby, North Yorkshire: "City of Troy" at grid reference SE625718, described as the smallest turf maze in Europe.
- Hilton, Cambridgeshire (cut in 1660)
- Saffron Walden, Essex (design with four "bastions"; recut in 1699; path is a narrow groove, marked with bricks in 1911)
- Troy Farm, Somerton, Oxfordshire: "Troy"
- St. Catherine's Hill, Hampshire, near Winchester : "Miz-Maze" or "Mizmaze" (unusual square design; path is a narrow groove)
- Wing, Rutland: "The Old Maze"

The mazes in Alkborough, Breamore, Hilton, and Wing are of the same design as found in Chartres Cathedral, whereas the Saffron Walden maze is embellished with four pointed corners, sometimes known as "Super Chartres" design. Those in Somerton and Dalby are of "Classical" design, resembling those found on Cretan coins.

There are two sites in the Isles of Scilly where the paths of several labyrinths have been delineated with stones (as in Scandinavia):

- Camperdizil Point, St Agnes
- St Martin's
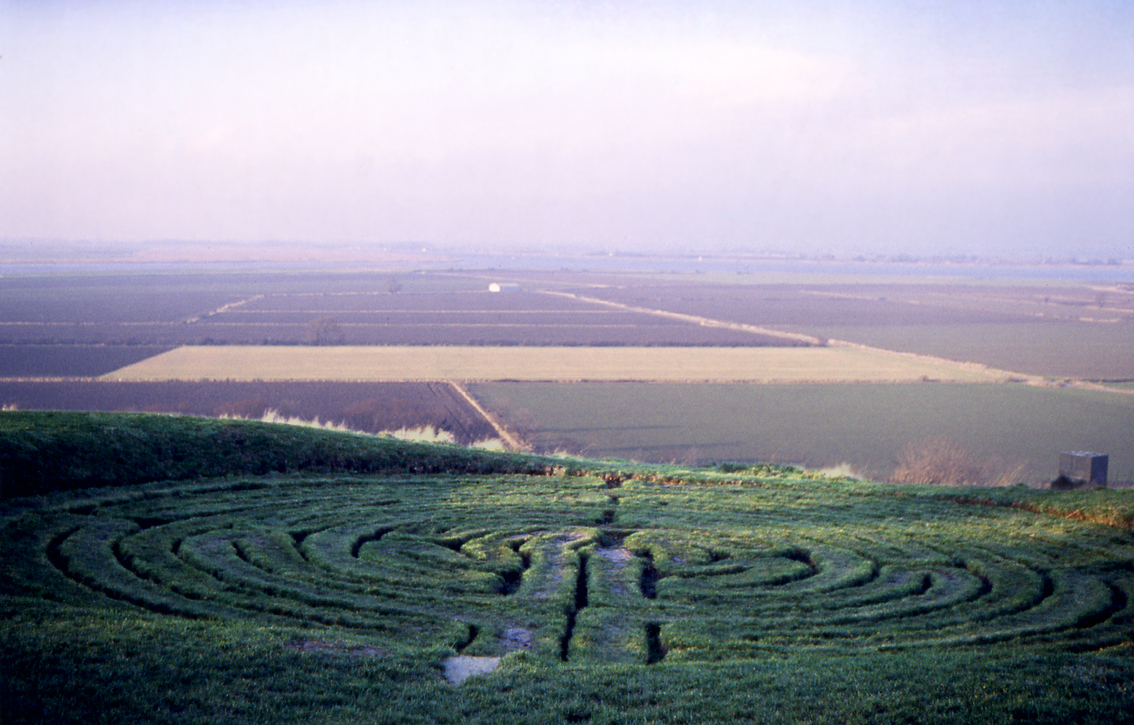
Julian's Bower, Alkborough, North Lincolnshire

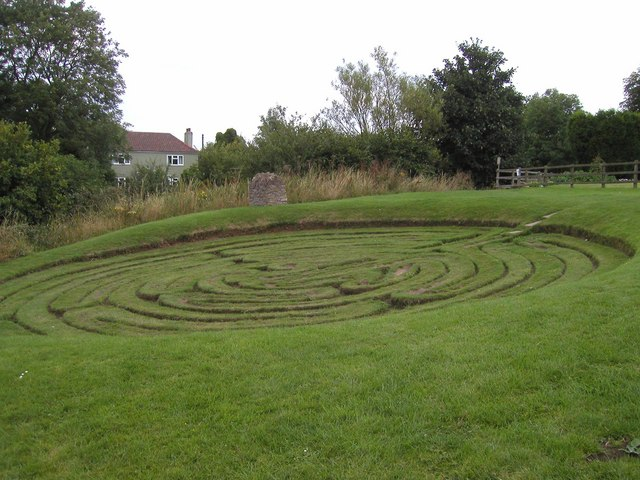
Another view of Julian's Bower

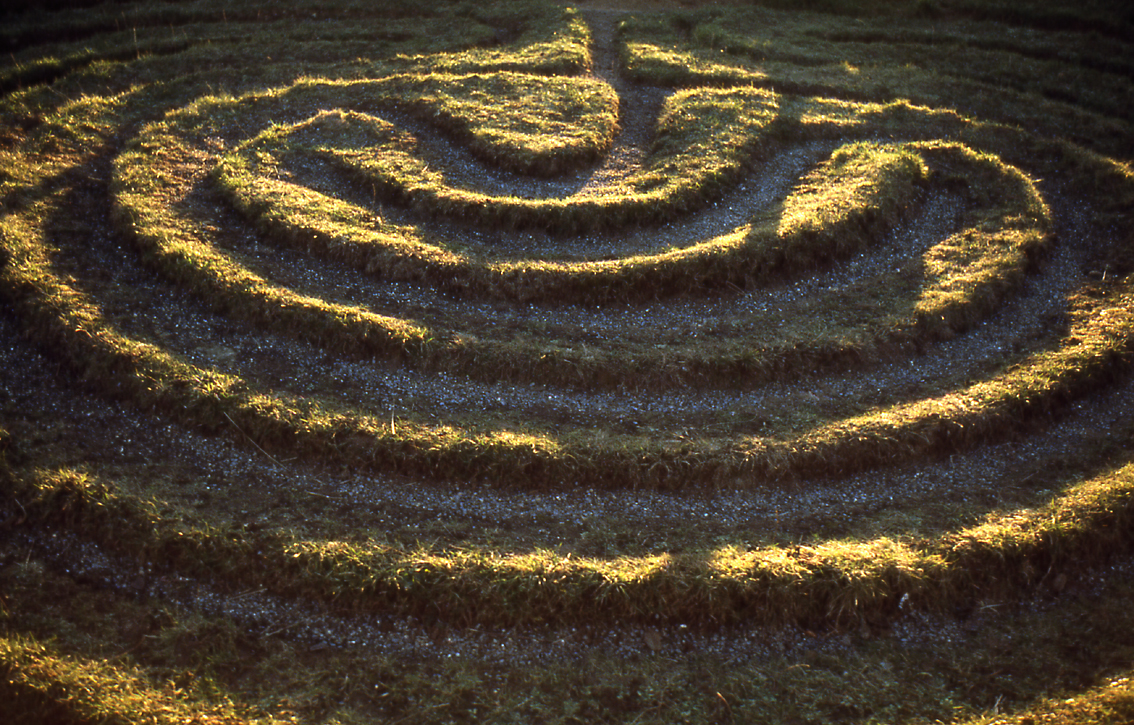
The "City of Troy" near Dalby, North Yorkshire

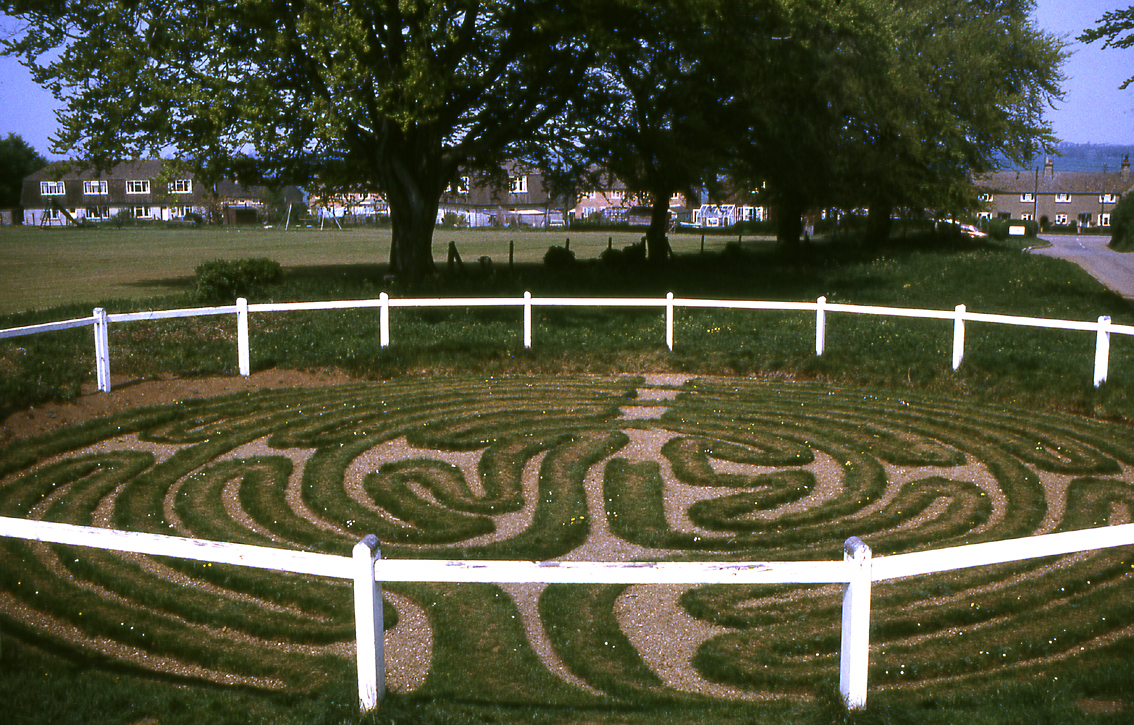
The turf maze at Wing in Rutland

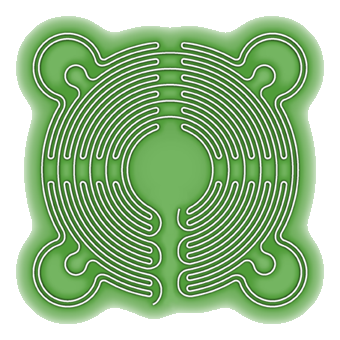
Saffron Walden turf maze (diagram)

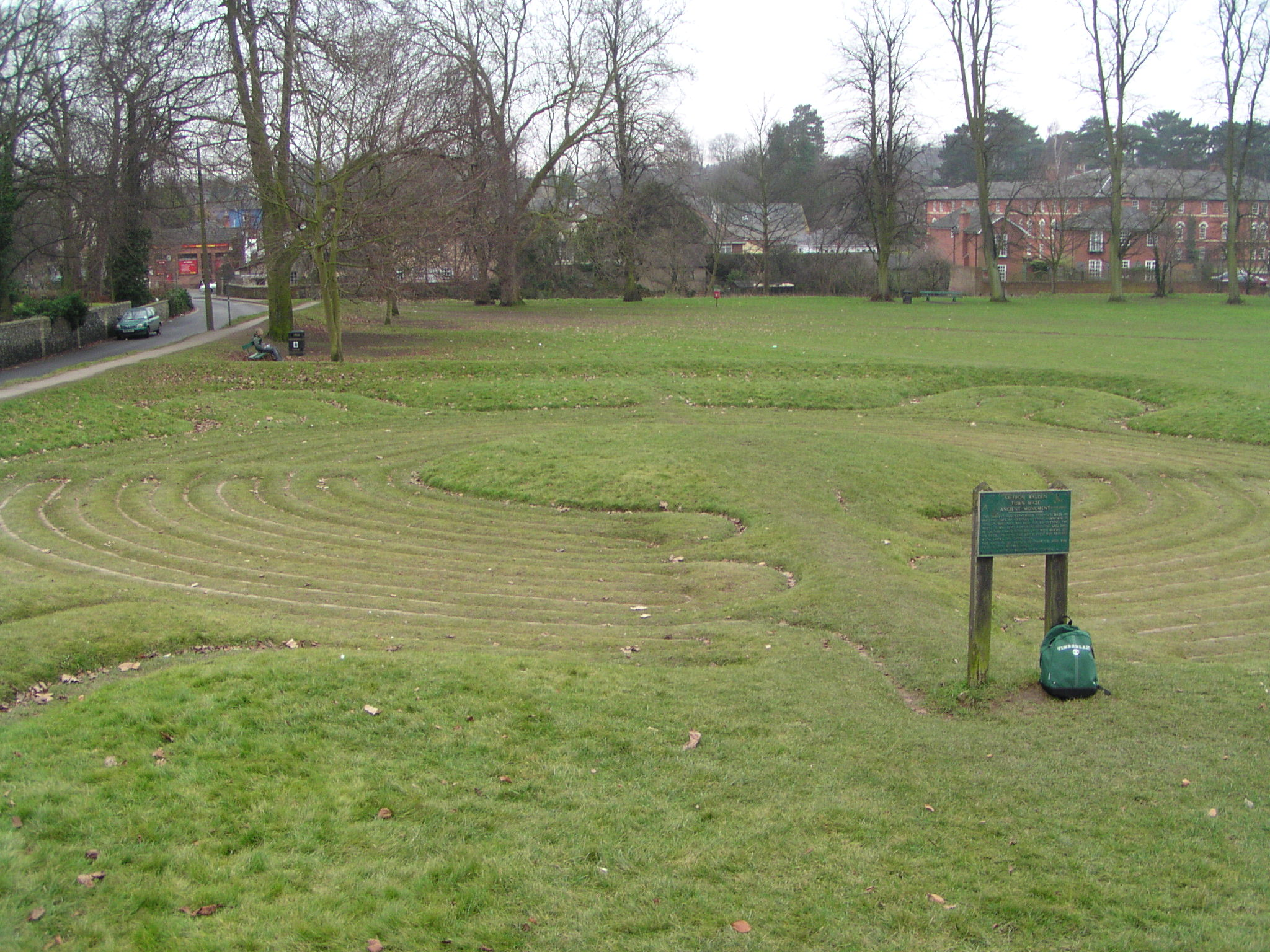
Saffron Walden turf maze (photo, pre-2006)

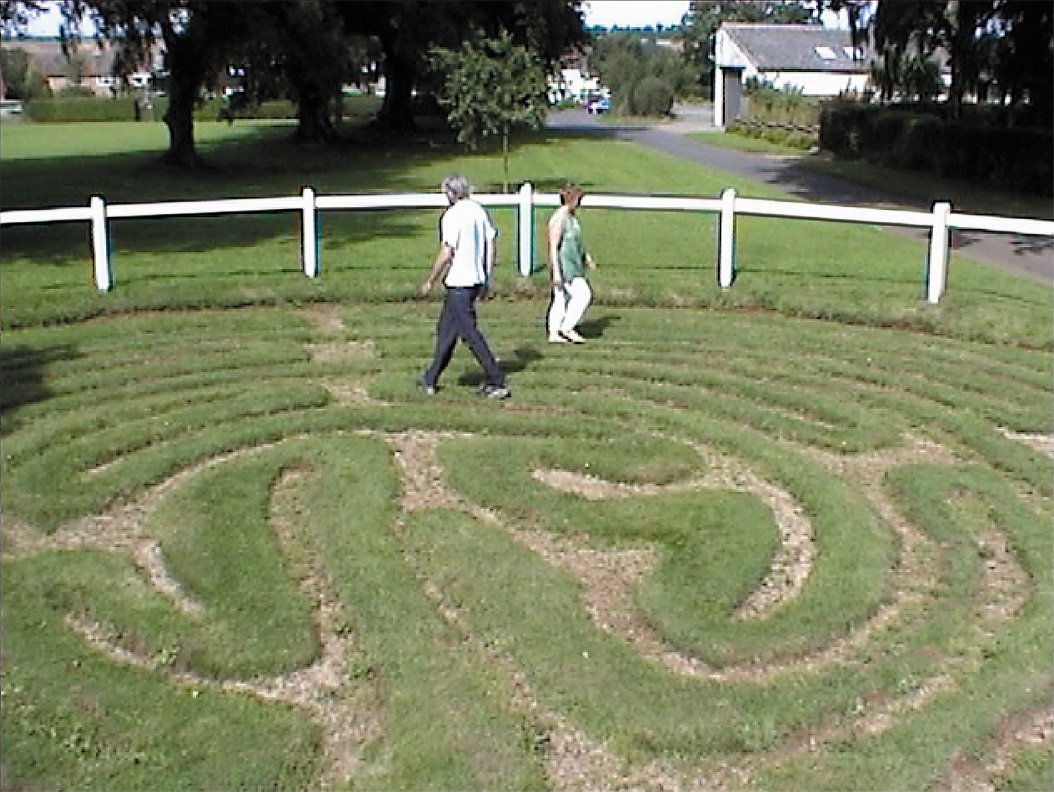
Walking the turf maze at Wing, Rutland

=== Lost British turf mazes ===
According to W.H. Matthews (Mazes and Labyrinths, 1922), turf mazes also used to exist at the following 29 locations:

- Appleby, Lincolnshire "Troy's Walls" (mentioned by Abraham de la Pryme c. 1700)
- Asenby, North Yorkshire (extant but "ruinous" in 1908)
- Ashwell, then in Bedfordshire (mentioned by William Stukeley in the 18th century)
- Bere Regis, Dorset
- Boughton Green, near Boughton, Northamptonshire "Shepherd Ring" or "Shepherd's Race" (unusual spiral centre; extant 1849 but "neglected", destroyed by soldiers digging practice trenches during World War I)
- Clifton, Nottinghamshire
- Comberton, Cambridgeshire (extant 1922, relocation of earlier maze, "The Mazles")
- "Troy-town" near Dorchester, Dorset
- Dover's Hill near Chipping Campden, Gloucestershire (mentioned by John Aubrey)
- "Maiden Bower" on downs near Dunstable, Bedfordshire
- Edenbridge, Kent: maps mark a "Troy Town" and "Troy Lane" at grid reference TQ426477 close to the Surrey/Kent border and about 2 km northwest of Edenbridge
- Egton, North Yorkshire, near Whitby (traces visible in 1872)
- On Hilldown hill, between Farnham and Guildford, Surrey: "Troy-town"
- Goathland, North Yorkshire: "July Park" or "St Julian's"
- Herefordshire Beacon in the Malvern Hills
- Horncastle, Lincolnshire "Julian Bower" (mentioned by Stukeley in the 18th century)
- Leigh, Dorset (overgrown by 1868; a raised hexagonal earthwork remains)
- Louth, Lincolnshire "Gelyan Bower" (mentioned in accounts of 1544)
- Lyddington, Rutland (regarded by Matthews as doubtful)
- Holderness, between Marfleet and Paull, East Riding of Yorkshire (near Kingston upon Hull) "The Walls of Troy" (dodecagonal. Illustrated 1815)
- Pimperne, Dorset "Troy-town" (unique design; described by John Aubrey; ploughed up 1730)
- Putney Heath, Surrey
- Ripon, North Yorkshire (unusual spiral centre; ploughed up 1827)
- Marshes between Burgh, Cumbria and Rockliffe, Cumbria "The Walls of Troy" (extant 1883) and two others (one of them cut in 1815)
- Sneinton, Nottinghamshire "Robin Hood's Race" or "Shepherd's Race" (unusual design with four bastions; ploughed up February 1797)
- Tadmarton Heath, Oxfordshire
- Walmer, Kent a "bower" or "Troy-town"
- West Ashton, Wiltshire (mentioned by John Aubrey)
- Westerham, Kent

Matthews also mentions several locations where the existence of now-vanished turf mazes may be inferred from place names. In addition he states "They are also recorded as having existed in Wales and Scotland." It has been estimated that there may once have been as many as 80–100 turf mazes in Britain.

=== Historic turf mazes in Europe ===
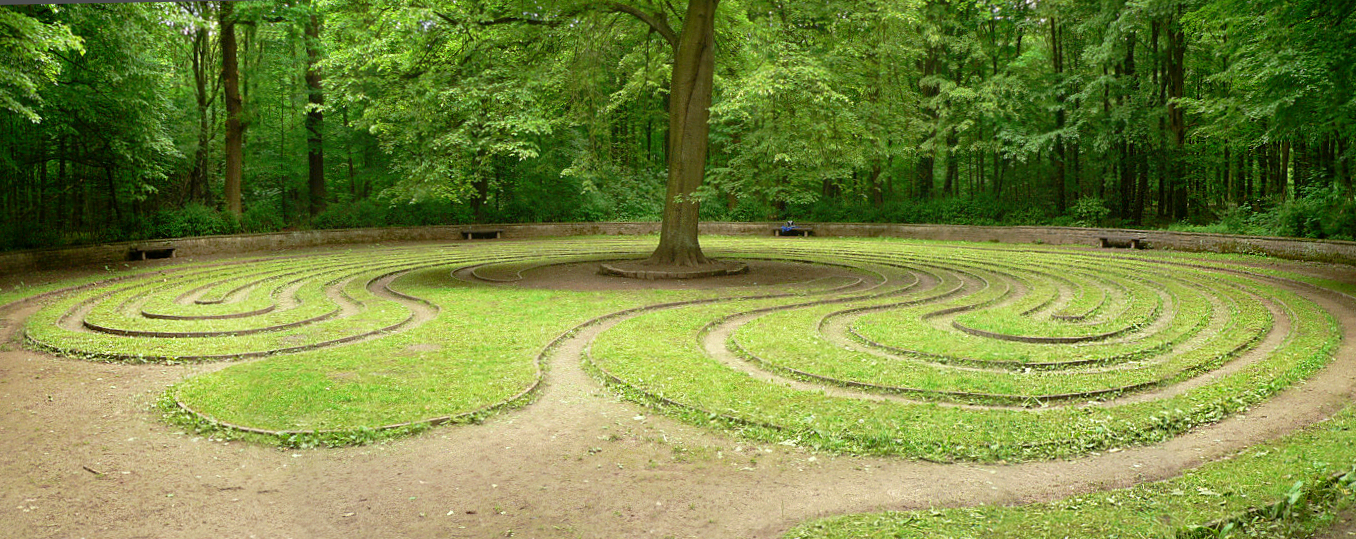
Turf Maze in Eilenriede forest, Hannover, Germany

- Eilenriede forest, near Hanover, West Germany "Das Rad" ("The Wheel") (processional type, with tree at centre and short-cut to exit; has existed since at least 1642)
- Graitschen, near Camburg, Thuringia, East Germany "Schwedenhieb", "Schwedenhugel" or 'Schwedenring"
- Steigra, near Querfurt, Saxony-Anhalt, East Germany "Schwedengang", "Schwedenring" or "Trojaburg"
- Tibble near Anundshög, Västerås, Sweden "Trojienborg" (named on map of 1764)

== Some modern turf mazes ==
(Note that not all are open to the public).

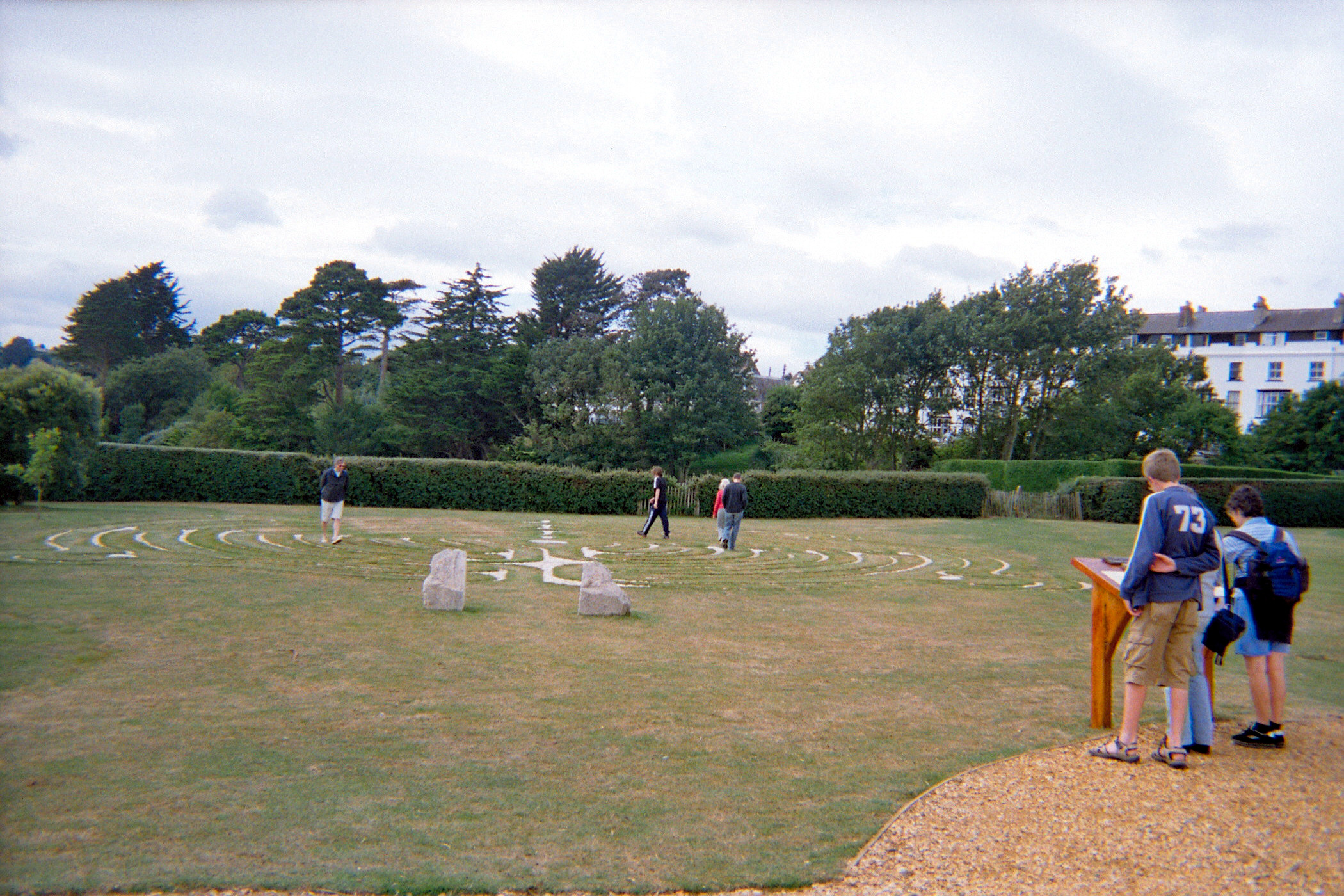
Seaton Labyrinth

- Greensboro, Vermont, USA (labyrinth by Sig Lonegren, 1986)
- "Archbishop's Maze" Grey's Court, Henley-on-Thames, Oxfordshire, England (by Randoll Coate and Adrian Fisher, 1981) (brick paths; a unicursal/multicursal hybrid)
- Chenies Manor House, Chenies, Buckinghamshire, England (unusual design based on painting of 1573; built by Denys Tweddell, 1983)
- "Earth and Wild Flower Labyrinth", Tapton Park, Chesterfield, Derbyshire, England (by Jim Buchanan, 1996; largest classical labyrinth in the world?)
- Navano, California, USA (labyrinth by Alex Champion, 1987)
- Cloisters of Norwich Cathedral, Norwich, Norfolk, England (grass paths marked out with stone; by Jane Sunderland, 2002)
- Parkfield, Warrington, Cheshire (gravel paths; made 1985)
- Rose Hill Quarry, Swansea, Wales (gravel paths; by Bob Shaw, 1987)
- Rosehill Park, Rawmarsh, South Yorkshire (a small maze with gravel paths, 2010)
- Oak Lane, Rougham, near Bury St Edmunds, Suffolk, England (by Clare Higson, 1998)
- Norton Museum of Art, West Palm Beach, Florida, USA, (by Adrian Fisher, 1997)
- "Seaton Millennium Labyrinth" Seaton, Devon, England (2005)
- Tofte Manor, Sharnebrook, Bedfordshire, England (Chartres replica with grass paths marked with stone; by Jeff Saward and Andy Wiggins, 2004)
- Solsbury Hill, Bath, Somerset, England (cut in the mid-1990s on the hill in protest of the A46 road which was in construction at the time)
- Stoke Newington, Hackney, London, England open to the public at the West Hackney Recreation Ground (2014)
- Cathedral of The Isles, on Isle of Cumbrae, Scotland, has a turf maze adjacent to the cathedral.

== See also ==
- Hedge maze
- Corn maze
