= Troy Town =

Name given to many English turf mazes

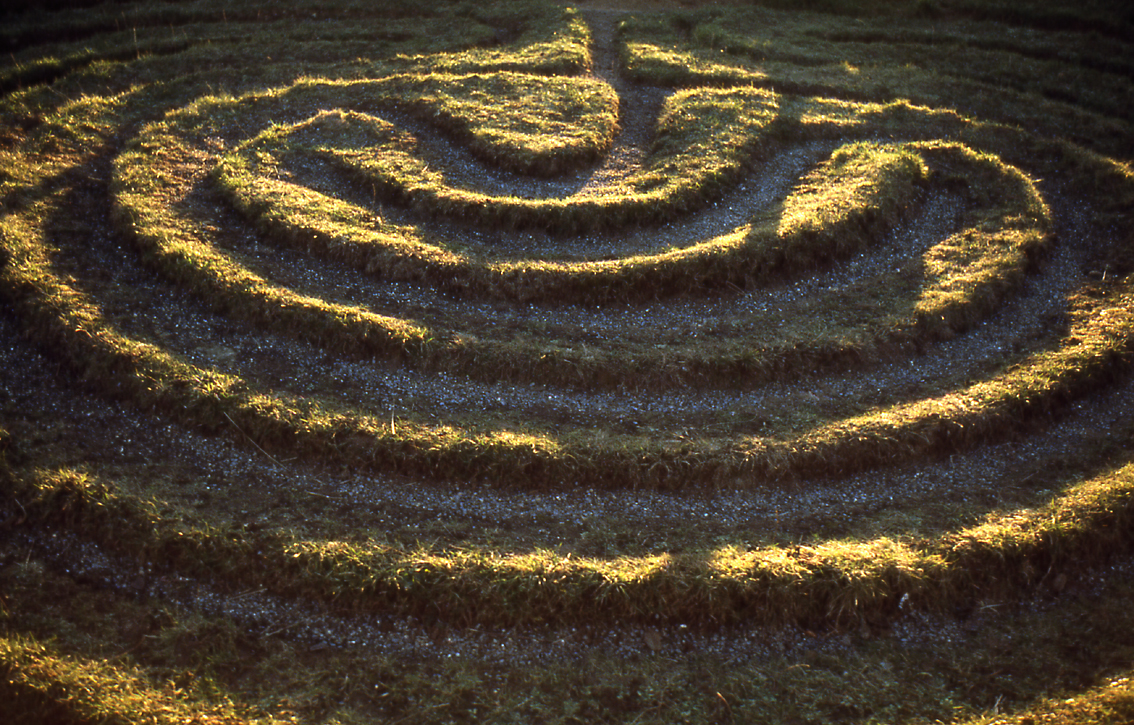
"The City of Troy" near Dalby, North Yorkshire, is said to be Europe's smallest turf maze.

Troy Town, Troy-town or variations of it (e.g., Troy, The City of Troy, Troy's Walls, Troy's Hoy, or The Walls of Troy) was the name given to many turf mazes in England presumably because, in popular legend, the walls of the city of Troy were constructed in such a confusing and complex way that any enemy who entered them would be unable to find his way out. Welsh hilltop turf mazes (none of which now exist) were called "Caerdroia", which can be translated as "City of Troy" (or perhaps "castle of turns").

W. H. Matthews, in his Mazes and Labyrinths (1922), gives the name as "Troy-town". More recent writers (such as Adrian Fisher, in The Art of the Maze, 1990) prefer "Troy Town".

The name "Troy" has been associated with labyrinths from ancient times. An Etruscan terracotta wine-jar from Tragliatella, Italy, shows a seven-ring labyrinth marked with the word TRUIA (which may refer to Troy). To its left, two armed soldiers appear to be riding out of the labyrinth on horseback, while on the right two couples are shown copulating. The vase dates from about 630 BC. The ancient Roman equestrian event known as the "Troy Game", which involved riding in maze-like patterns, has sometimes been linked to this vase.

== Historic "Troy" turf mazes in England ==
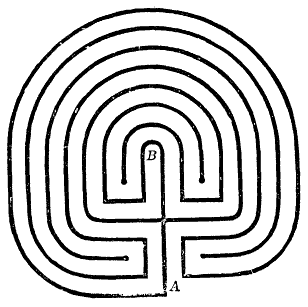
A seven-ring Classical labyrinth. The "Troy" mazes at Dalby and Somerton are based on this ancient design.

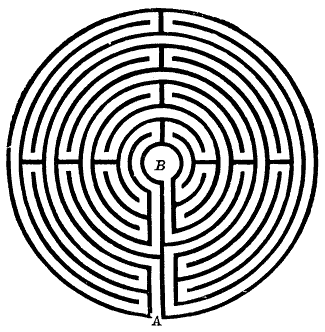
Medieval labyrinth

Of the eight surviving historic turf mazes in England, three have "Troy" names. "The City of Troy" is a small but well-maintained roadside maze near the small villages of Dalby, Brandsby, and Skewsby, not far from Sheriff Hutton in the Howardian Hills of North Yorkshire. "Troy", a beautiful maze in a private garden at Troy Farm, Somerton, Oxfordshire, is rather larger, and "Troy Town" maze on St Agnes, Isles of Scilly, is a small maze of turf and small stones and is reputed to have been laid down in 1729 by the son of a local lighthouse keeper. All three follow the classical labyrinth pattern (as found on coins from ancient Knossos) rather than the medieval variation. It is not known when the first two of these turf mazes were originally constructed; however, the turf was re-cut at Dalby in 1900 due to road damage.

=== Surviving examples ===
- Roadside near Dalby, North Yorkshire: "The City of Troy" or "The Walls of Troy" (seven-ring)
- Troy Farm, Somerton, near Banbury, Oxfordshire: "Troy" (fifteen-ring)
- Troy Town, St. Agnes, Isles of Scilly: "Troy Town"

=== Lost examples ===
(From W. H. Matthews' Mazes and Labyrinths 1922)

- "Troy-town" near Dorchester, Dorset. Although the maze is lost, the place name Troy Town still survives here.
- On Hilldown, a hill between Farnham and Guildford, Surrey "Troy-town"
- Holderness, between Marfleet and Paull, East Riding of Yorkshire (near Kingston upon Hull) "The Walls of Troy" (this had a unique dodecagonal layout; illustrated 1815)
- Pimperne, Dorset "Troy-town" (unique design, roughly triangular, with paths winding apparently at random; described by antiquary John Aubrey in 1686; ploughed up 1730)
- In the marshes between Burgh and Rockcliffe, Cumbria, "The Walls of Troy" (extant 1883) and two other turf mazes (one of them cut in 1815)
- Walmer, Kent a "bower" or "Troy-town"

== Parallels in Scandinavia, the Baltic and White Sea coasts ==
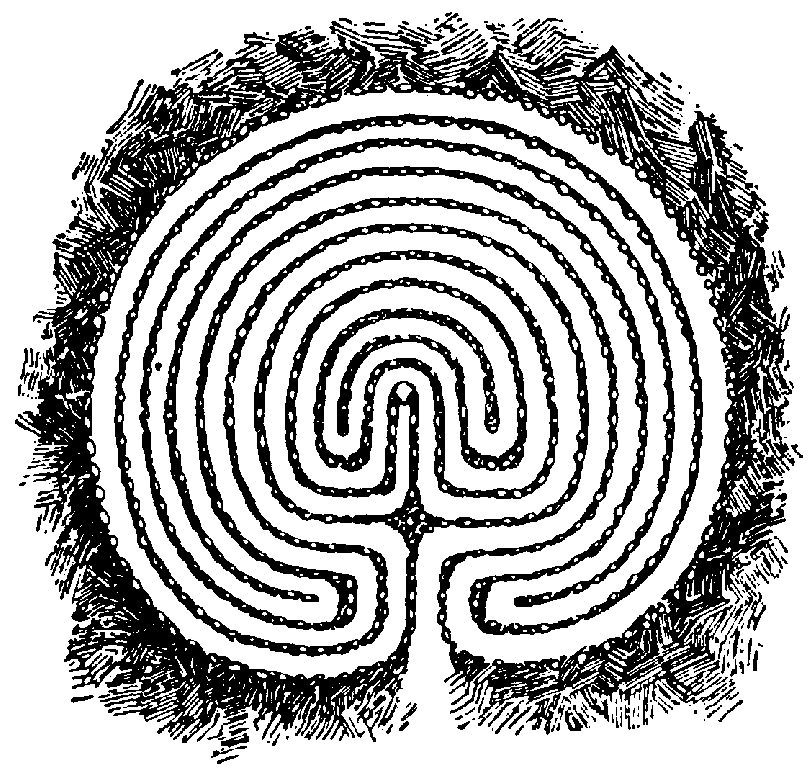
The eleven-ring "Trojaborg" labyrinth, from Visby, Sweden (Illustration from the Nordisk familjebok, 1926)

There are also similar labyrinths in northern continental Europe. Their paths are outlined with stones (unlike the turf-cut mazes of England, and those that formerly existed in Denmark). Stone-lined labyrinths such as these have proved slightly easier to date than turf mazes (which have to be cleaned out regularly to keep their paths clear, thus destroying any archaeological evidence). The stone labyrinths around the Baltic coast have been dated to between the 13th century and modern times, with a peak in the 16th and 17th centuries.

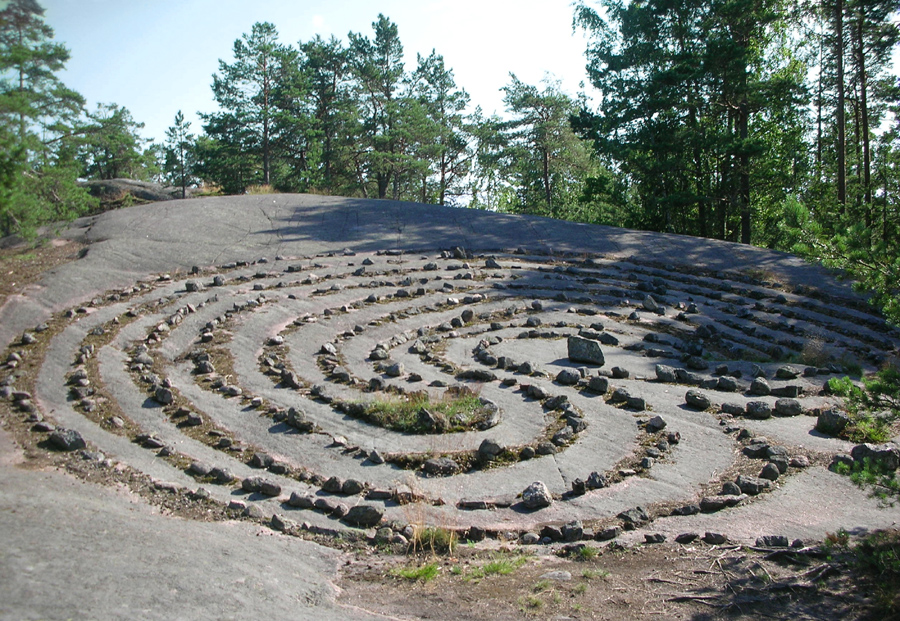
Troy Town in Nagu, Finland

There were once many hundreds, perhaps even thousands, of these labyrinths around the Baltic Sea, throughout Fennoscandia and the Baltic countries, and many of them still survive, particularly in remote areas. There are also similar stone labyrinths in the Kola Peninsula and coasts and islands of the White Sea, such as Stone labyrinths of Bolshoi Zayatsky Island. For some reason these northern labyrinths are almost all close to the sea. Some have suggested that they were markings of seafarers, perhaps even used for navigation. Many of the stone labyrinths around the Baltic coast of Sweden were built by fishermen during rough weather and were believed to entrap evil spirits, the "smågubbar" or "little people" who brought bad luck. The fishermen would walk to the centre of the labyrinth, enticing the spirits to follow them, and then run out and put to sea.

Several similar classical-type labyrinths in Scandinavia have names such as Trojaborg, Trojaburg, Trojborg, Tröborg and Trojienborg, which can all be translated as "City of Troy". (The place-name Trelleborg, which means "ring fort", has also been linked with labyrinths.) In Finland such labyrinths are called Jatulintarha ("giant's garden" or "giant's corral") or jättiläisen tie ("giant's road"). In Finland they have also been called by the names of notable biblical places, such as Jerusalem, and walking through the maze was regarded as a symbolic pilgrimage to the place it was named after. In Finland's Swedish speaking coastal areas the labyrinths are called jungfrudans or "maiden's dance".

== See also ==
- Labyrinth
- Maze
- Mizmaze
- "The White People"
