= Maiden Bower hillfort =

Hillfort in Bedfordshire, England

Maiden Bower
- Location within Bedfordshire
- 51°53′31″N 0°33′11″W
- Periods: Neolithic; Iron Age; Romano-British
- Location: near Dunstable, Bedfordshire
- OS grid reference: SP 997 225

Site notes
- Area: 4.9 hectares (12 acres)
- Excavation dates: 1913
- Archaeologists: Worthington G. Smith

Scheduled monument
- Designated: 13 December 1929
- Reference no.: 1015593

Maiden Bower is an Iron Age hillfort near Dunstable in Bedfordshire, England. The site, which also has traces of a Neolithic causewayed enclosure, is a scheduled monument.

== Description ==
The fort is situated on a plateau, and there is a disused chalk quarry on the north-western side. The fort has a single rampart, height up to 3 metres (9.8 ft), about 100 metres (330 ft) of which has been lost to the quarry. It is roughly circular, about 225 metres (738 ft) in diameter, enclosing an area of about 4.9 hectares (12 acres). The interior has been under cultivation in recent times. There is an external ditch, but this is infilled and no longer visible. It has been revealed in section on the side of the chalk quarry; it was V-shaped, about 3 metres (9.8 ft) deep and 6–9.7 metres (20–32 ft) wide.

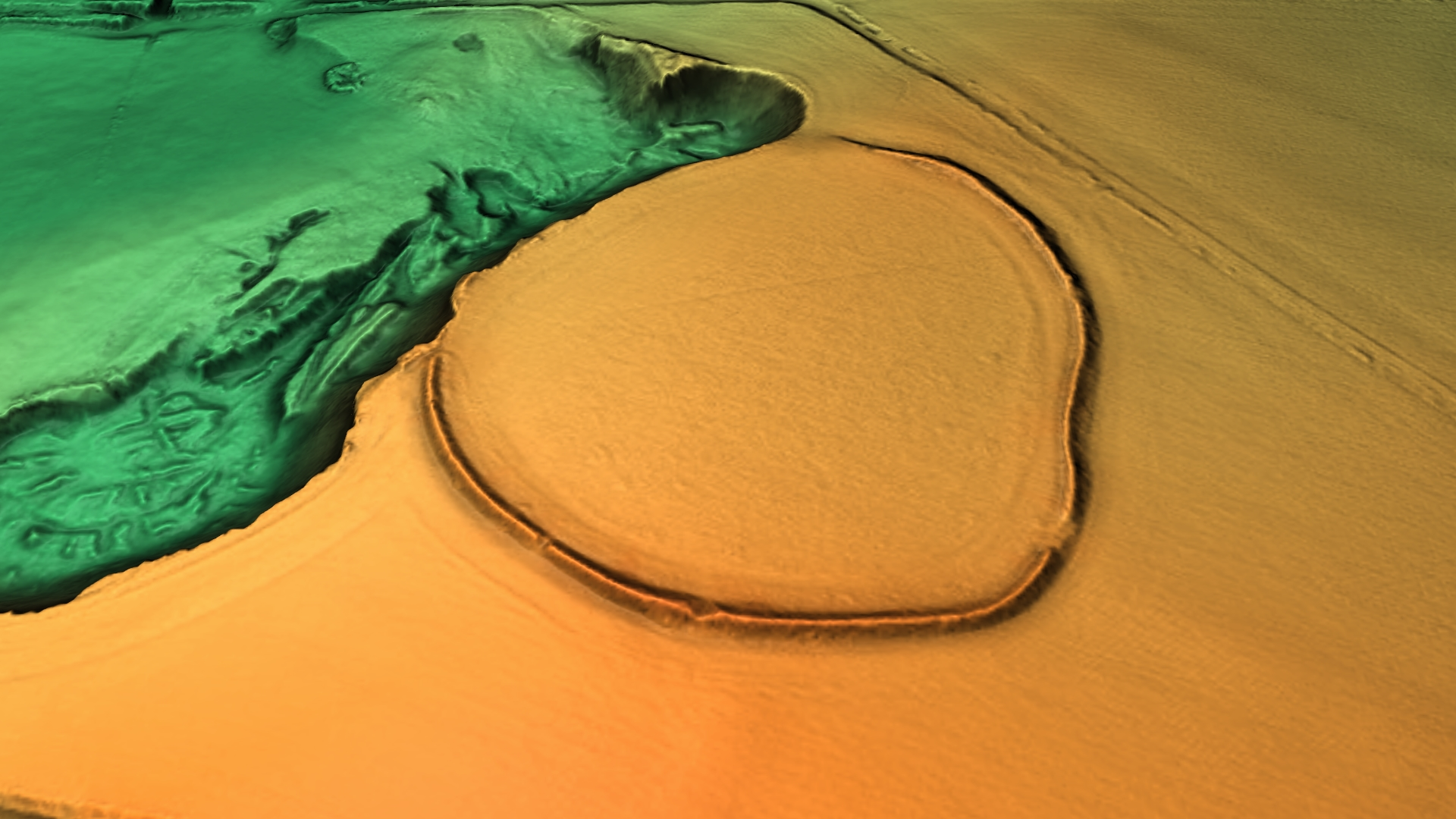
3D view of the digital terrain model

There is an original entrance gap on the south-east, and other later gaps. There was excavation by Worthington G. Smith, and the owner of the site, in 1913 at the south-east entrance. They found features later interpreted as the west wall of a timber gateway. Across the entrance was found a large pit with the disarticulated remains of about 50 persons, thought to be a ritual mass reburial rather than an indication of warfare.

=== Causewayed enclosure ===
Worthington Smith, as the quarry was encroaching, investigated features outside the rampart between the 1890s and 1915. He found a segmented ditch, where there were finds of flint tools and pottery. It was established in the 1930s that the finds were Neolithic, and that the ditch was a Neolithic causewayed enclosure, over part of which the hillfort was later constructed.

=== Romano-British ===
Before there was excavation, Roman coins and other objects had been found in the area of the site. Worthington Smith in 1907 discovered a small early Roman cremation cemetery on the north-west side of the fort where the quarry was encroaching; Samian ware and other pottery of the period was found. In 1991, Romano-British pottery was found within the fort on the western side during fieldwalking, and a geophysical survey showed a building on the western side; it is thought that it may have been a Roman temple.

=== Turf maze ===
The 18th-century antiquarian William Stukeley, in a discussion of Julian's Bowers, thought they were once sites of turf mazes, and regarded Maiden Bower as having been such a site.

== See also ==
- Hillforts in Britain
