= Julian's Bower =

Coordinates: 53.684854°N 0.669407°W

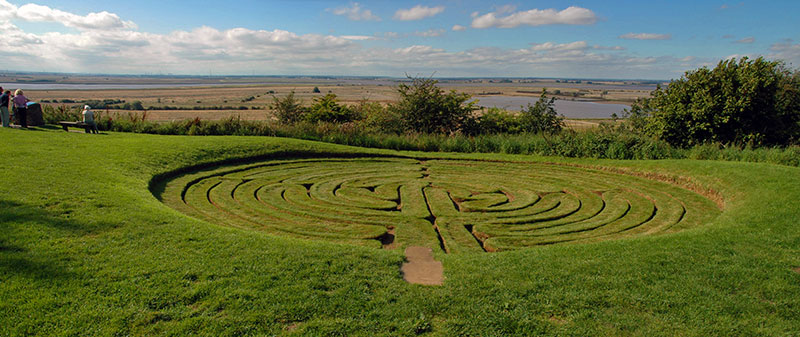
Julian's Bower, as seen looking west

Julian's Bower or Julian Bower is a name given to turf mazes in several different parts of England. Only one of this name still exists, at Alkborough in North Lincolnshire. It has also been known by corrupted forms of the name, such as "Gillian's Bore" and "Gilling Bore".

The 18th-century antiquary William Stukeley mentions a "Julian Bower" turf maze at Horncastle, Lincolnshire, and in nearby Louth there was a "Gelyan Bower", mentioned in accounts of 1554.

At Goathland, North Yorkshire, there was a "July Park" or "St Julian's" maze.

At Whinfell Forest there is a farm called Julian Bower, originally built to support the Keeper. It now lies outside the forest boundary.

Some English turf mazes are very similar in their layout to Scandinavian labyrinths, which usually have their paths marked with stones. At Grothornet, near Vartdal in the Sunnmore district of Norway, there is a stone-lined labyrinth called "Den Julianske Borg" ("Julian's Castle").

The name is believed to be derived from Julus, son of Aeneas of Troy, and the word place-name element burgh, meaning "a fortified place", "fort" or "castle". The reasoning behind this etymology is based on the fact that many mazes and labyrinths in Britain were called "Troy", "Troy Town" or "The Walls of Troy"; similar names, such as "Trojaburg", "Trojburg" or "Trelleborg", were used in Scandinavia. In popular legend, the walls of the city of Troy were constructed in such a complex and confusing way that any enemy who entered them would be unable to find his way out.

== Modern History ==
In recent times it has been maintained by Ken Goy, a volunteer, known for being prolific in its upkeep. For his devotion he was awarded, in 2012, North Lincolnshire best maintained church ground and surrounding area.

On a clear day, Emley Moor TV tower (40 miles), the top of York Minster and the Kilburn White Horse (45 miles) can be seen from Julian's Bower.

== See also ==
- Turf maze
- Caerdroia
- Labyrinth
