= Listed buildings in Dalby-cum-Skewsby =

Dalby-cum-Skewsby is a civil parish in the county of North Yorkshire, England. It contains two listed buildings that are recorded in the National Heritage List for England. Of these, one is listed at Grade I, the highest of the three grades, and the other is at Grade II, the lowest grade. The parish contains the settlements of Dalby, Skewsby and Witherholm and the surrounding countryside, and the listed buildings consist of a church and a farmhouse.

== Key ==
Grade	Criteria
I	Buildings of exceptional interest, sometimes considered to be internationally important
II	Buildings of national importance and special interest

== Buildings ==
Name and location	Photograph	Date	Notes	Grade
St Peter's Church; 54.13284°N 1.02628°W		Early 12th century	The church has been altered and extended through the centuries, including alterations in 1886. It is built in sandstone with roofs of Welsh slate and lead, and consists of a three-bay nave with a two-light bellcote on the west gable, a south porch, and a two-bay chancel. The south doorway is Norman with one order and imposts. The chancel has the appearance of a tower house, with stepped buttresses and an embattled parapet. The east window has three lights, the jambs with carved depictions.	I
Witherholme Hall; 54.12487°N 1.02422°W		Mid 16th century	A stone farmhouse with a pantile roof, two storeys and a loft, three bays, and a rear outshut. The central doorway has a three-pane fanlight, the windows are sashes, and all the openings have segmental arches of brick headers.	II
