= Mount Ephraim Gardens =

Edwardian terraced gardens in Hernhill, Kent, England

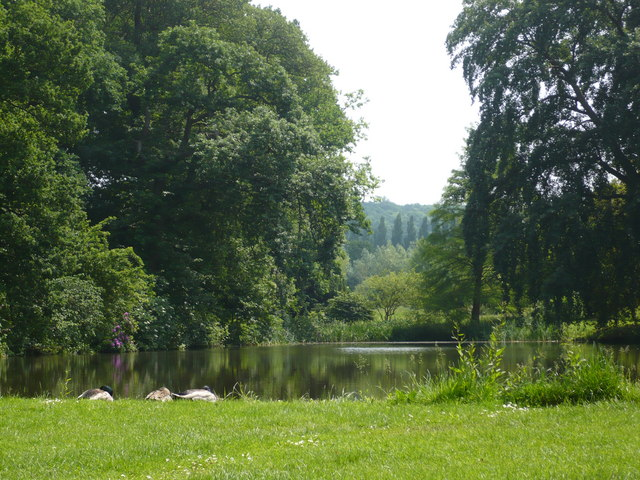
- Looking across the lake at Mount Ephraim Gardens towards Hernhill
- Interactive map of Mount Ephraim Gardens
- Location: Hernhill, near Boughton Street, UK
- Coordinates: 51.3011°N 0.9597°E
- Area: 10 acres (40,000 m^{2})
- Opened: 1965
- Operator: The Dawes Family
- Status: Open March–September, Wednesday, Thursday, Friday, Saturday and Sunday as well as Bank Holidays.
- Collections: Japanese garden, topiary, rose garden, grass maze and rock garden
- Website: http://www.mountephraimgardens.co.uk/gardens/

Mount Ephraim Gardens is an Edwardian terraced gardens located at Hernhill, near Faversham, in the English county of Kent.

== History ==
The gardens are laid out around a large house and 800 acres (3,200,000 m^{2}) estate. It was originally built in 1695, then rebuilt in 1878 and then extended 1913 all for the Dawes family. The house is listed Grade II on the National Heritage List for England, and its gardens are also Grade II listed on the Register of Historic Parks and Gardens.

The gardens were laid out in the early 1900s, but after wartime neglect (when most adult men were enlisted in wartime services) were substantially restored by Mary and Bill Dawes from the early 1950s. Mary Dawes was involved in the day-to-day running of the gardens until her death in 2009, at the age of 93. Mount Ephraim has never been a 'professionally' maintained garden, but Mary had always lovingly tended it.

== Description ==
Mount Ephraim Gardens have a large collection of spring bulbs, trees and shrubs including Rhododendrons, many types of Camellias and Magnolias. It has various areas, including the Millennium Rose Garden.

It also has a large Sweet Chestnut, planted to commemorate the Battle of Waterloo.

The 'Miz-maze' was planted in 2004 on the slopes of a former vineyard. Based on an ancient labyrinth called a Mizmaze (Mary Dawes, who lived at Mount Ephraim for sixty years, was always known to family and friends as 'Miz'). It was created by garden designer Sarah Morgan. Although based on a traditional labyrinth design, the layout incorporates some dead-ends, making it a hybrid between a maze and a labyrinth. The pattern of the grass paths is marked out with combinations of tall-growing ornamental grasses and colourful herbaceous perennial plants.

The rock garden together with the water garden, is based on a series of pools ornamented with a Japanese stone bridge and stone lanterns.

The topiary of the garden has been cut into a various birds and animals, and also First World War memorabilia in clipped yew. The long herbaceous border, has a brick wall giving wind shelter and it provides colour throughout the flowering season.

The arboretum was planted to commemorate the late Mary Dawes' 80th birthday and also the 300 years of the family's ownership of Mount Ephraim. Sited on an artificially raised mound, the area gives far views of Blean woods, Hernhill church and the Miz Maze.

The gardens also include a Ha-ha, which was built in the 18th century of red brick. It is about 3 feet high, and approximately 100 yards in length. It has a double curve.
