= Randoll Coate =

British diplomat and maze designer (1909–2005)

- Born: 8 October 1909; Lausanne, Switzerland
- Died: 2 December 2005 (aged 96); Le Rouret, France
- Occupations: Diplomat, maze designer
- Awards: Chevalier of the Ordre de Léopold (1965); Member of the Royal Victorian Order (1966)

Gilbert Randoll Coate (8 October 1909 – 2 December 2005) was a British diplomat, maze designer and "labyrinthologist".

== Early life ==
The son of Charles Philip Coate, an expatriate businessman, Randoll Coate was born in Lausanne, Switzerland. After studying at the Collège de Lausanne he won a scholarship to Oriel College, Oxford, reading French and German. In 1940 he was commissioned into the Intelligence Corps, using his language abilities to interrogate prisoners of war in the "London Cage". He also took part in Operation Archery, a commando raid on port at Vågsøy, Norway and helped support Greek resistance fighters in liberating Kalamata.

== Diplomatic career ==
After the war, Coate joined the UK Foreign Office with diplomatic postings to Salonika, Oslo, Leopoldville, Rome, The Hague, Buenos Aires, Stockholm and finally Brussels at which point he took early retirement in 1967.

== Maze designer ==
Having had a long-standing interest in art and history, Coate took to designing mazes and completed over 50 new mazes in Britain and around the world. Coate's maze designs are particularly noted for their symbolism. Although it is rarely possible to see a large maze in plan view, Coate's designs would often incorporate hidden shapes and references of significance to the clients who had commissioned the maze.

Coate's first maze commission, The Imprint of Man, was completed in 1975 for a private garden at Lechlade Mill in Gloucestershire. The overall outline was of a giant footprint 57 m long by 29 m wide – a size calculated to match the size of a 300-m tall person, matching the height of the Eiffel Tower. The hedge maze, constructed from 3,000 yew bushes, ended up too large for its intended field. Coate's solution was to extend the maze into the adjacent river, creating an artificial island for the second toe. The intricate design incorporated 132 symbols, including numbers, signs of the zodiac and animals, birds and fishes. Some of his other notable mazes include;

- Pyramid (1977) — yew hedge maze in the form of a pyramid at the Château de Belœil, Belgium, in which the height of the hedges increases to reach 6 m at the centre
- Creation (1979) — yew hedge maze at Värmlands Säby, Sweden, for the Baroness of Falkenberg, with overlapping layers of symbolism. Seen one way, the egg-shaped outline represents the Garden of Eden incorporating figures for Adam, Eve, the Serpent and the apple. Seen another way, the hedge outlines form the shape of the horned Minotaur of the original Minoan labyrinth.

=== Minotaur Designs ===
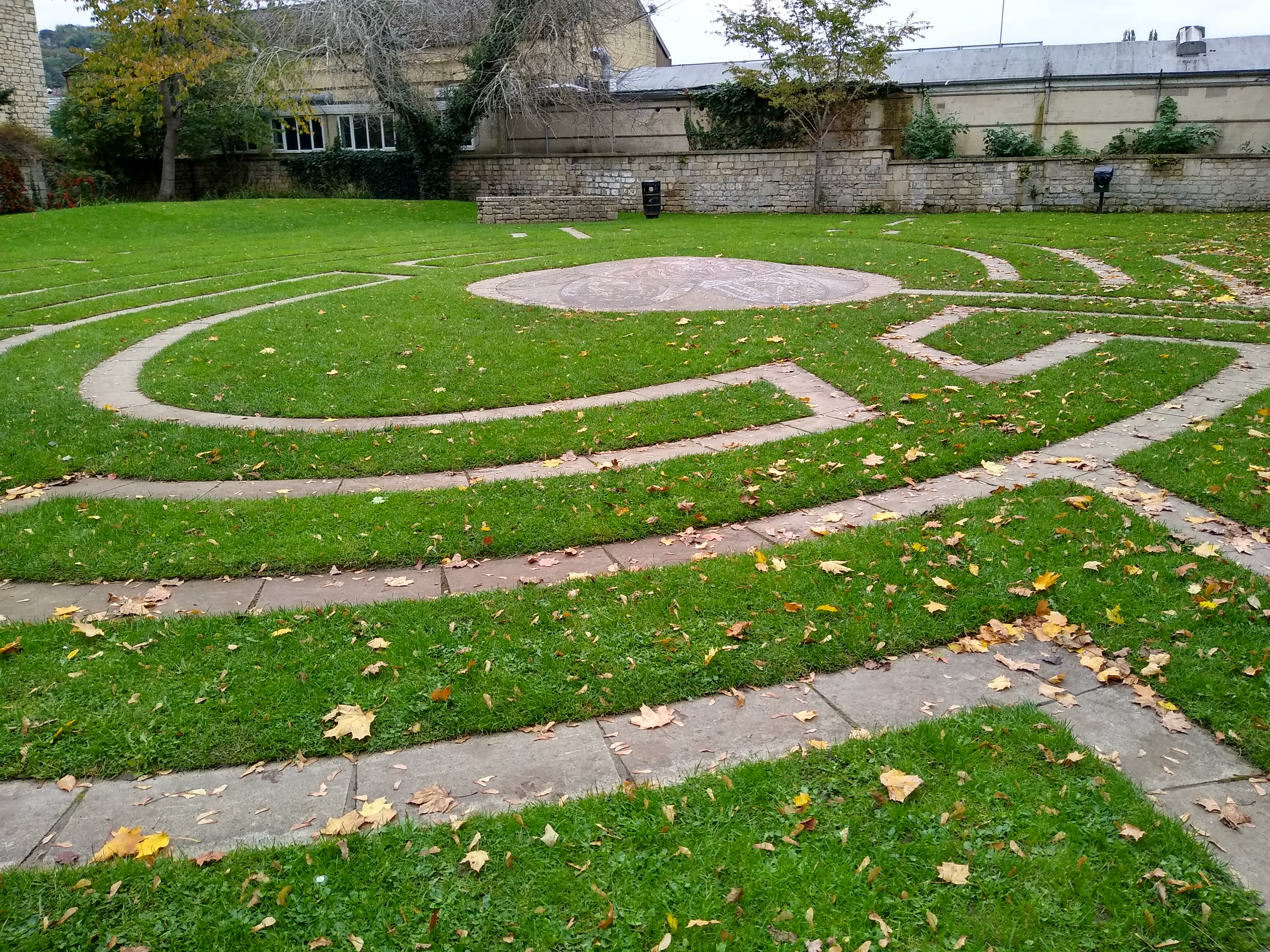
Beazer Garden Maze in Bath

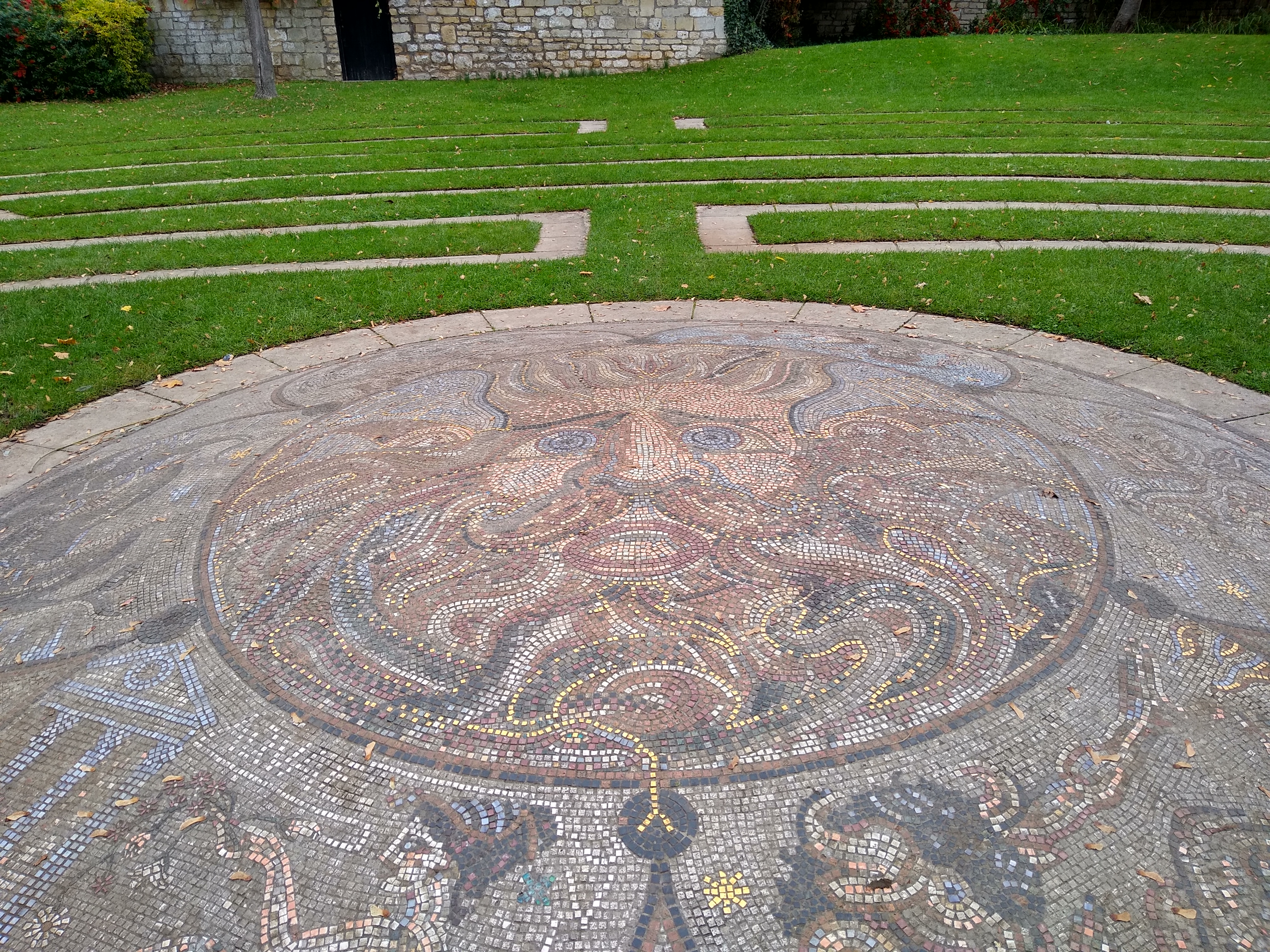
Mosaic at the centre of the Beazer Garden Maze

In 1979, Coate was introduced to Adrian Fisher, another enthusiastic maze designer. Shortly afterwards Coate and Fisher formed the maze design company Minotaur Designs and designed 15 mazes together between 1979 and 1989, (some with the landscape architect Graham Burgess in 1983 and 1984). These included:

- Archbishop's Maze (1980) — a brick path and turf maze at Greys Court, England, incorporating Christian symbolism to commemorate the maze metaphor that Robert Runcie mentioned in his enthronement address on becoming Archbishop of Canterbury
- Beatles Maze (1984) — brick path and water-channel maze at the first National Garden Festival, Liverpool, England, featuring an 18-ton, 15.5-m long sculpture of a yellow submarine at its centre, and with an outline in the shape of an apple, in reference to The Beatles' Apple Corps record label
- Bath Festival Maze (1984) — a stone path in Beazer Gardens near the Pulteney Bridge, Bath, England, celebrating the city of Bath with motifs based on Georgian fanlights, arches from Isambard Kingdom Brunel's railway and a Roman-inspired mosaic circle at its centre
- Marlborough Maze (1988) — a yew hedge maze at Blenheim Palace for the Duke of Marlborough and based on a stone carving by Grinling Gibbons representing the "Panoply of Victory", with a symbolism based on cannons, banners and trumpets.
- Alice in Wonderland Maze (1991) - an octagonal beech hedge maze at Adventure Wonderland Park, Dorset, England, portraying eight characters from the famous story, all facing towards the central raised mound which portrays a clock at four o'clock, perpetual tea time.
- Lappa Valley Railway Maze — brick path in grass maze at the Lappa Valley Steam Railway, Cornwall, England, in the shape of the early steam locomotive designed by Richard Trevithick.

=== Other mazes ===
- Sun Maze and Lunar Labyrinth (1996) — Longleat, near Bath, England, for the Marquess of Bath (who has another four mazes in the grounds of the house)
- Lappa Valley Railway Maze — yew hedge at the Lappa Valley Steam Railway, Cornwall, England, shaped like an early steam locomotive
- El laberinto de Borges (Borges Memorial Maze, 2003) — San Rafael, Mendoza, Argentina, box hedge maze, measuring 95 m by 65 m, in memory of the writer Jorge Luis Borges (a personal friend of Coate's), inspired by his short story "El Jardín de senderos que se bifurcan" (English: "The Garden of Forking Paths"). Shaped like an open book, the design incorporates, in Braille, a quotation from the blind writer, that a book and a labyrinth are "one and the same".
- The same design of the Borges Memorial Maze was used to build another one in the city of Venice in 2011, near the basilica of San Marcos, at San Giorgio Magiore´s gardens
- Ziggurat Maze Moray, Scotland
- Ariel Maze Jersey
- Pommerie Maze Shropshire

== Family life ==
In 1955, Coate married the painter, Pamela Dugdale Moore, with whom he raised two daughters, Caroline and Penelope. He was also made a Chevalier of the Ordre de Léopold in 1965 and appointed a Member of the Royal Victorian Order (MVO) in 1966.

He died in Le Rouret, near Grasse, France, on 2 December 2005, aged 96.

== Bibliography ==
- Coate, R; Mont Athos, la Sainte Montagne (Arthaud, 1949)
- Fisher, Coate and Burgess; A Celebration of Mazes (1984) ISBN 0-948265-85-X.
