= Mizmaze =

Historic turf mazes in England

Coordinates: 50.9817°N 1.8001°W

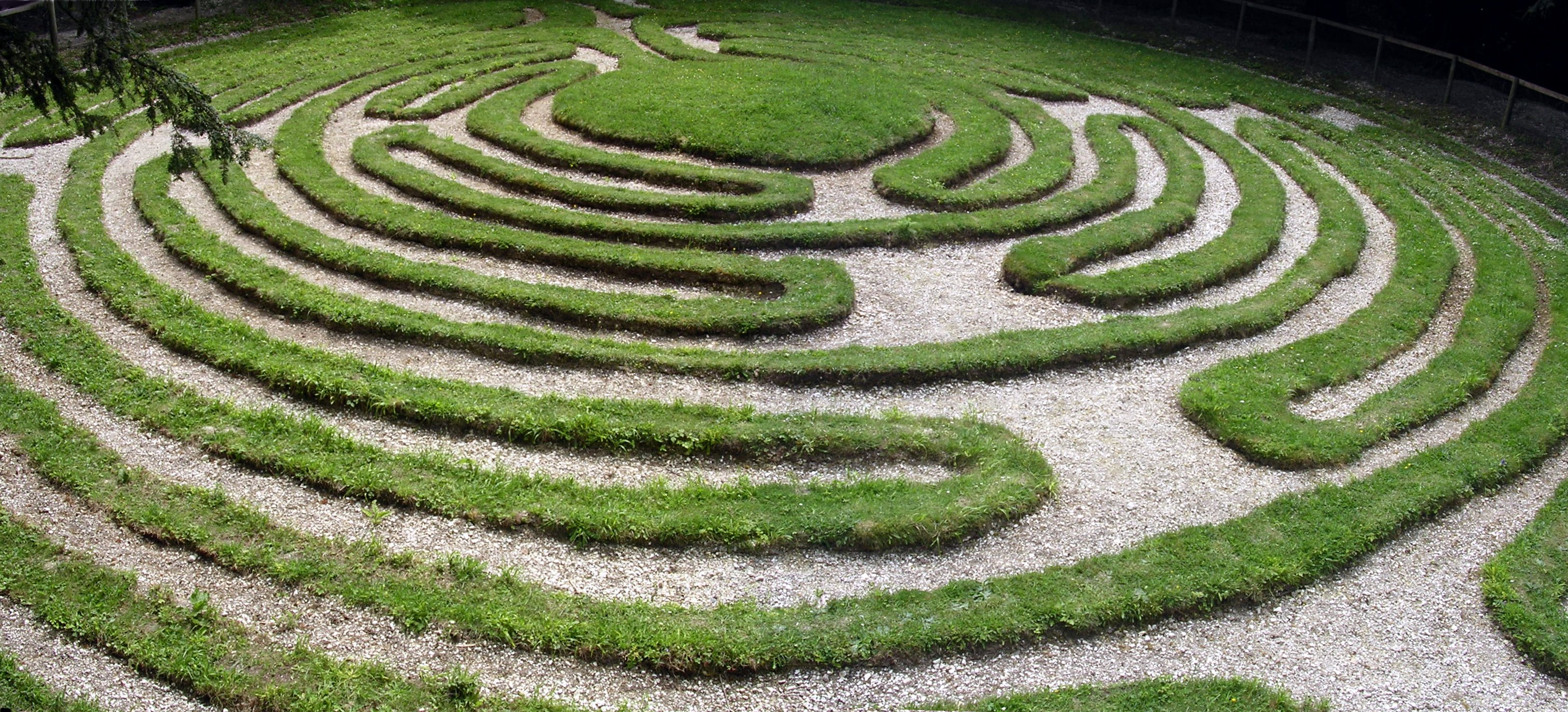
The Breamore Miz-Maze in May 2005

Mizmaze (or Miz-Maze or Miz Maze) is the name given to two of England's eight surviving historic turf mazes, and also to a third, presumably once similar site (at Leigh in Dorset) that is now merely a relic. Of the two which survive, one is at Breamore, in Hampshire; the other is on top of St Catherine's Hill, overlooking the city of Winchester, Hampshire.

A mizmaze forms a pattern unlike conventional mazes and is classed as a labyrinth because the path has no junctions or crossings. The pattern appears more like a very long rope, neatly arranged to fill the area.

== Breamore Mizmaze ==
The Breamore Mizmaze, set on a hill close to Breamore House, is a quartered labyrinth similar in design to the labyrinth at Chartres Cathedral. It is enclosed by a grove of yew trees; close to it is a Bronze Age barrow or burial mound. The Mizmaze itself is fenced which aids its conservation. In early 2010 a few surrounding trees were felled as water falling from overhanging branches was eroding part of the maze, but the overall character of the setting is unaffected; as it is difficult to date turf mazes, it is in any case possible that there was no woodland when it was created. The turf labyrinth itself is well-maintained. (Location just south of Salisbury, off A338).

== St Catherine's Hill ==
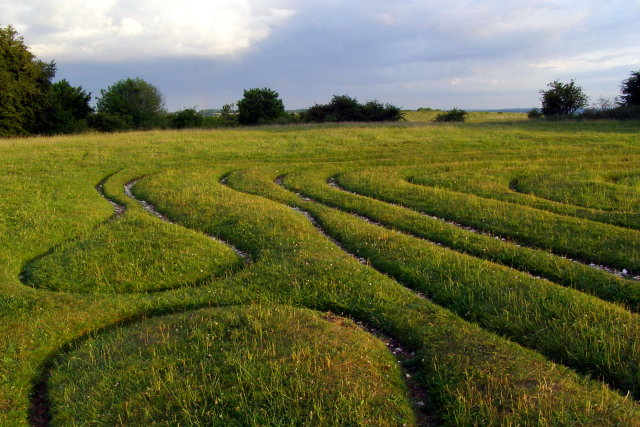
Mizmaze on St Catherine's Hill

The Winchester Mizmaze is most unusual, being roughly square, although its paths curve gently and it has rounded corners. It is also one of only two surviving historic English turf mazes where the path is a narrow groove in the turf (the other is at Saffron Walden, Essex). More commonly the turf itself forms the raised path, which is marked out by shallow channels excavated between its twists and turns; this is the case at Breamore, where the mizmaze is circular (a version of the medieval labyrinth design) and surrounded by trees. (The Winchester mizmaze is visible in Google Earth atop St. Catherine's hill. Google Maps co-ord: 51.045662, -1.311743 (+51° 2' 44.38", -1° 18' 42.27".)

== Mount Ephraim Mizmaze ==
A large modern Mizmaze has been created by garden designer Sarah Morgan at Mount Ephraim, a 9-acre (36,000 m^{2}) garden near Faversham, Kent, England. Although based on a traditional labyrinth design, the layout incorporates some dead-ends, making it a hybrid between a maze and a labyrinth. The pattern of the grass paths is marked out with combinations of tall-growing ornamental grasses and colourful herbaceous perennial plants.

== See also ==
- Troy Town
