= Adventure Wonderland =

Theme park in Hurn, Dorset, England

- Previously known as Alice in Wonderland Park
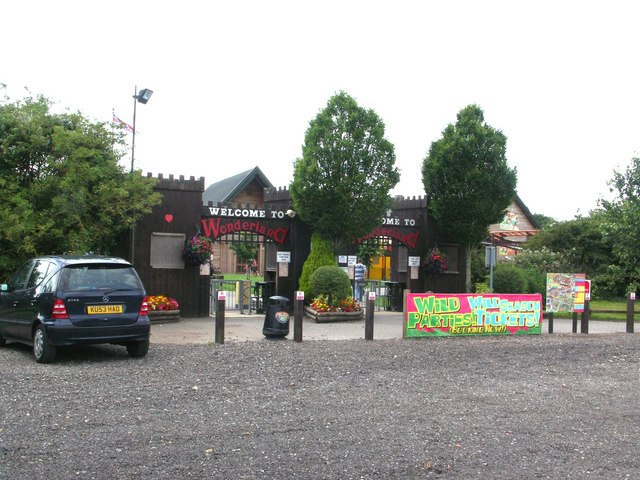
- Entrance to Adventure Wonderland
- Interactive map of Adventure Wonderland
- Location: Hurn, Dorset, England
- Coordinates: 50.776°N 1.845°W
- Status: Defunct
- Opened: 1992
- Owner: Wonderland Park LLP
- Slogan: Whatever the weather ... guaranteed fun! And 'A full days fun at Dorset's number one!'
- Operating season: March - October (full park) November - March (indoor play)
- Area: 10 acres (4.0 ha)

Attractions
- Total: Over 30 rides and attractions
- Roller coasters: 0
- Water rides: 0
- Other rides: 0
- Website: www.adventurewonderland.co.uk

Adventure Wonderland was a family theme park situated in the village of Hurn, near Bournemouth, United Kingdom. The park offered rides and attractions aimed at families with children up to the age of 10. It drew much of its theme from the novel Alice in Wonderland by Lewis Carroll and Alice, The Mad Hatter, the Queen of Hearts, The Cheshire Cat, and The White Rabbit make appearances throughout the day around the park and in the theatre shows.

In September 2023, the park announced it would be closing all outdoor rides but retaining its indoor play centre, with birthday parties and Christmas attraction. It plans a return to its roots of a traditional family park in 2024 with the Maze at its centre. The indoor play centre closed in January 2024.

The park also hosts a number of special character day events as well as seasonal Halloween and Christmas themed events.

== Geography ==
Adventure Wonderland is situated in Hurn, Dorset. The park features 1.5 miles of pathways, covering 20 acres of land, adjacent to Bournemouth International Airport. The site is also home to Bournemouth's Aviation Museum, situated on land opposite the car park, having moved there in Autumn 2008.

== History ==
Adventure Wonderland was created by the farmer Russell Lucas-Rowe. The third generation of a local farming family based at Hurn, the origins of Adventure Wonderland started in approximately 1971, when the site was originally a pick your own strawberries and raspberries.

Whilst parents were picking fruit, Lucas-Rowe wanted an area of the site for children's entertainment, so created a garden and maze. On first thinking about a design, Lucas-Rowe chose the theme of the Lewis Carroll children's novel, Alice In Wonderland, realising there was a local connection (Alice Pleasance Liddell, the inspiration for the title character lived in Lyndhurst, Hampshire, approximately 21.9 miles away).The name was later altered to 'Adventure Wonderland' in order for the park to appeal to boys and slightly older children.

The site originally opened as The Alice in Wonderland Maze and by the end of the first season, 54,000 people had visited. This encouraged Lucas-Rowe to gradually expand the children's park, which having taken off, resulted in the closure of the pick your own fruit.

In 2005, Adventure Wonderland opened a £1million Aztec-themed indoor play area named 'Wild Thing!' This allowed Adventure Wonderland to stay open year round, as they would previously close for the winter due to being an outside park.

By July 2011, Adventure Wonderland was one of Dorset's most popular attractions, with approximately 100 staff employed during the peak season and 180,000 visitors each year.

== Attractions and rides ==
=== Attractions ===
The park featured outdoor play areas and features. There was also a cafe and gift shop. Visitors could meet live characters, such as Alice and the Mad Hatter. Other live characters would visit, including from local holiday parks, such as Shorefield.

Name	Description
Adventure Wonderland Maze	
Alice at the Movies (Mini Golf)	9-hole crazy golf course with a theme of favourite family films
Battle Boats	Guests board boats equipped with water jets they can use to shoot other riders with water
Charlie Cool's Driving School	Guests drive kart-style safari jeeps around a racetrack
Dig for Gold	Guests sift through sand to find gold nuggets which can be exchanged for a free gift
Mr Rabbit's Big Bouncy Burrows	Six trampolines
Pony Palace	Stables of horses and donkeys, with availability for pony rides
Shetland World	Guests can cuddle a range of animals, including alpacas, pigmy goats, lambs, chickens, rabbits and guinea pigs
Shrinking Mirror Hedge	Guests walk through a series of pathways with various mirrors that distort their reflections
The Happydrome Theatre	A 300 seat theatre with live shows, including pantomimes, magic shows, singing and dancing, with an Alice in Wonderland theme
The Web	A large climbing structure

=== Rides ===
Name	Manufacturer	Type	Description	Opened	Closed	Fate
Flying Elephants	Modern Products	Junior Jets	Visitors sit in elephant carriage that spin around a roundabout	2000	2023	Unknown
Curvy Caterpillars	Modern Products	Track Ride	Visitors sit in a yellow caterpillar from the Alice in Wonderland story and travel around a circuit track	2001 or earlier	2023	Unknown
Space Orbiter	Modern Products	Major Orbit	Visitors sit in train carriages that speed along the twists and turns of a coaster track twice	2001 or earlier	2017	Unknown
Wild Bill's Runaway Train	Unknown	Sit Down		2004	2023	Unknown
Ghostly Galleon	Metallbau Emmeln	Pirate Ship	Visitors sit in rows in a large boat that hangs and swings back and forth from a central structure	2005	2023	Relocated to Southport Pleasureland
Turbo Teacups	Zamperla	Teacups	Visitors sit in coloured teacups that spin individually and around a large roundabout	2006	2023	Unknown
Shark Island	Shenyang Chuangqi Amusement Equipment	Shark Island		2009	2010	Unknown
Jabberwocky	Zapfun	Tube Slide	A huge spiral slide	2015	2023	Relocated to Southport Pleasureland
Jungle Falls	Pinfari	Junior Log Flume	A Cambodian jungle-themed log flume	2017	2023	Relocated to Southport Pleasureland
Giant Yo-Yo	S&W Amusement Sales	Junior Chair-O-Plane	Visitors sit in pairs on swings that hang from the roof and bob up and down as they go round	Unknown	2023	Relocated to Funland Hayling Island

=== Hedge maze ===
The park includes an octagonal, 240 ft × 240 ft (73 m × 73 m) beech hedge maze of 5,200 bushes, designed by Adrian Fisher. It was planted in 1990 and opened to the public in 1992.The maze has 1.75 miles of paths. As of 2011, it was four times the size of Hampton Court Palace's maze and the third largest maze in the UK, after Longleat Safari and Adventure Park and Blenheim Palace's maze. The Maze uses a 'left turn' route to complete.
