= St Peter's Church, Dalby =

Church in Dalby, North Yorkshire, England

Coordinates: 54°07′58″N 1°01′35″W

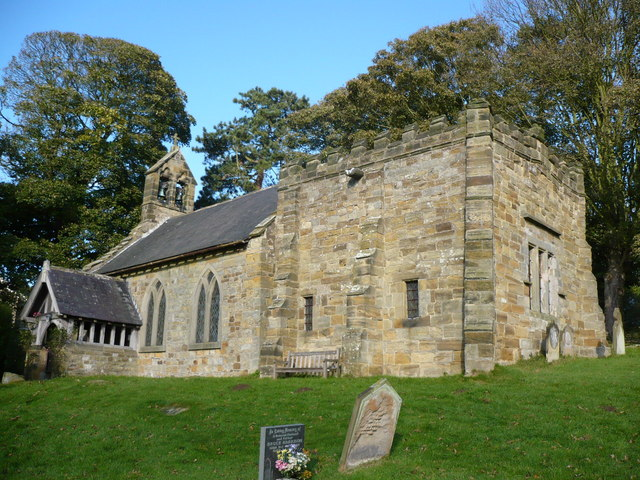
The church, in 2008

St Peter's Church is the parish church of Dalby, North Yorkshire, a village in England.

The church was built in the early 12th century, from which time, the east, south and west walls of the nave survive. It is believed that it was originally dedicated to Saint Mary. The chancel was rebuilt in an unusual fortified style in the 15th century, the north wall of the nave was rebuilt, a west window was inserted, and buttresses were added at the west end. A new east window was inserted in the 16th century. In 1886, the building was restored by James Demaine and Walter Brierley, whose work included a new south porch and some additional windows. The church was grade I listed in 1960.

The church is built of sandstone with roofs of Welsh slate and lead, and consists of a three-bay nave with a two-light bellcote on the west gable, a south porch, and a two-bay chancel. The south doorway is Norman with one order and imposts. The chancel has the appearance of a tower house, with stepped buttresses and an embattled parapet. The east window has three lights, the jambs with carved depictions. Carvings include a shield and a gargoyle.

Inside the church, the 12th century chancel arch survives. There are four 15th-century tie beams in the roof, and on the north wall of the nave, a small piece of a black letter inscription with a decorative border, with a similar fragment on the south wall of the chancel. There is a memorial to Alan Ascough dating from 1675 and an early-19th century white marble tablet. There is a coat of arms of King George IV, a benefaction board, a cast iron safe with Gothic tracery, and a font with a large bowl on a newer base.

== See also ==
- Grade I listed buildings in North Yorkshire (district)
- Listed buildings in Dalby-cum-Skewsby
