= Caerdroia =

Welsh turf maze

The design of a Caerdroia was very similar to a classical labyrinth

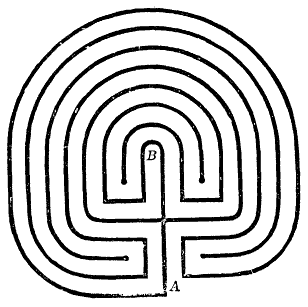
A diagram of the "Classical" labyrinth

A caerdroia is a Welsh turf maze, usually in the sevenfold Cretan labyrinth design. They were created by shepherds on hilltops and were apparently the setting for ritual dances, the nature of which has been lost. At the centre of each caerdroia was a small hillock—in Welsh, twmpath. A gathering for folk dancing in Wales is still called a twmpath dawns. While the caerdroia is typically Welsh, at least one is known to have been constructed abroad. It was discovered by historian Mario Ziccardi in Petrella Tifernina, Italy.

== Etymology ==
Caerdroea or Caer Droea is a Welsh word meaning "a labyrinth, a maze; maze cut by shepherds in the sward, serving as a puzzle." It also means "Troy, Walls-of-Troy". Variations include Caer Droia and Caerdroia, the latter being the spelling generally used today.

Because of the similarity between Welsh troeau (a plural form of tro 'turn') and the second element Troea ('Troy'), the name was later popularly interpreted as meaning 'fortress of turns' (caer = 'fort').

Many turf mazes in England were named Troy Town or The Walls of Troy (or variations on that theme) presumably because, in popular legend, the walls of the city of Troy were constructed in such a confusing and complex way that any enemy who entered them would be unable to find his way out.

== Gwydir Forest ==
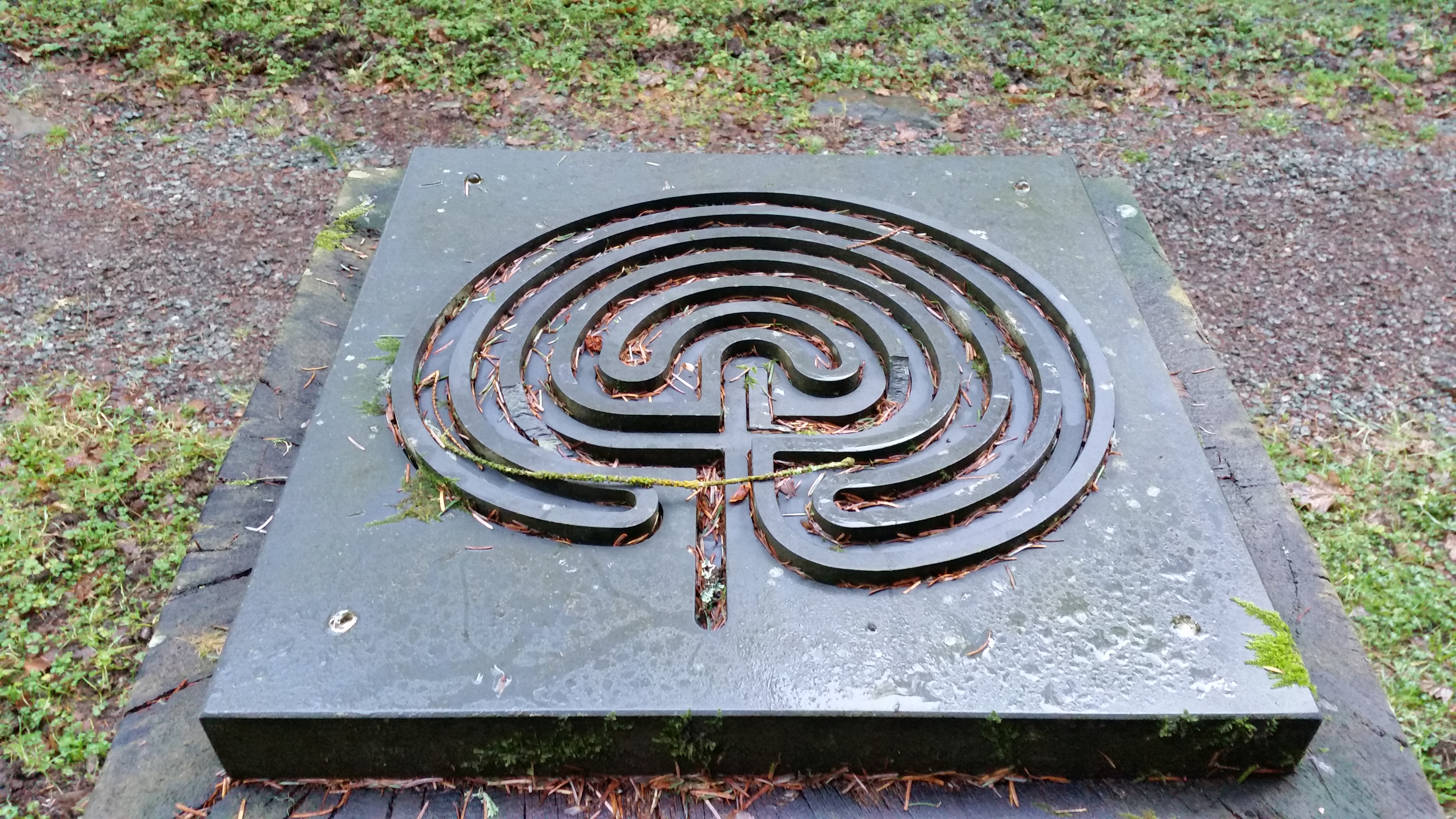
Plan of the Caerdroia labyrinth as displayed in Gwydir Forest

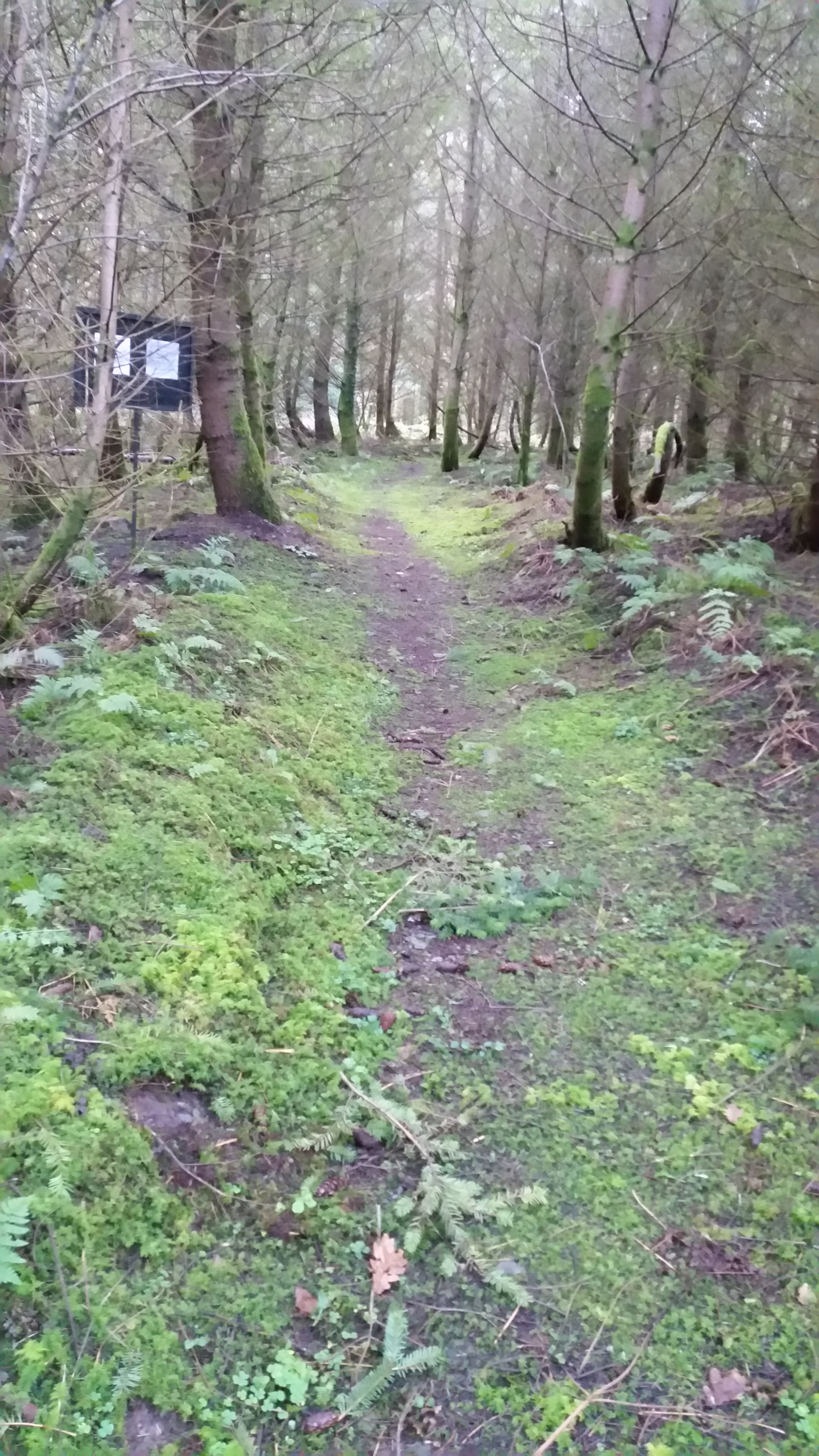
One of the paths at the Caerdroia in Gwydir Forest. Most of the labyrinth comprises woodland paths like this.

There is a Caerdroia in Gwydir Forest, above the Conwy Valley, Wales. It is a permanent Forest Labyrinth, built in 2005 by Theatre Cynefin, Golygfa Gwydyr (a social enterprise based in Llanrwst), and local young people. The paths measure a mile in length, making it possibly the largest labyrinth of its kind in the world. The Caerdroia has been a venue for a number of performances, initially by Theatr Cynefin, and since 2012 by Theatr Dan-y-Coed. Since its inception and construction on a grassy site at Pen-y-Parc, one of the highest parts of the forest, the low conifers between the paths have grown considerably, and it is now an integral part of the forest.

== Geoffrey of Monmouth ==
There is another connection between Wales and Troy that has been dismissed by some historians but retains wide belief. Geoffrey of Monmouth, following the early Welsh historian Nennius, wrote a Christian/classical genealogy with Brutus of Troy, grandson of Aeneas and liberator of enslaved Trojans, as founder of Britain.
