= Dalby-cum-Skewsby =

Civil parish in North Yorkshire, England

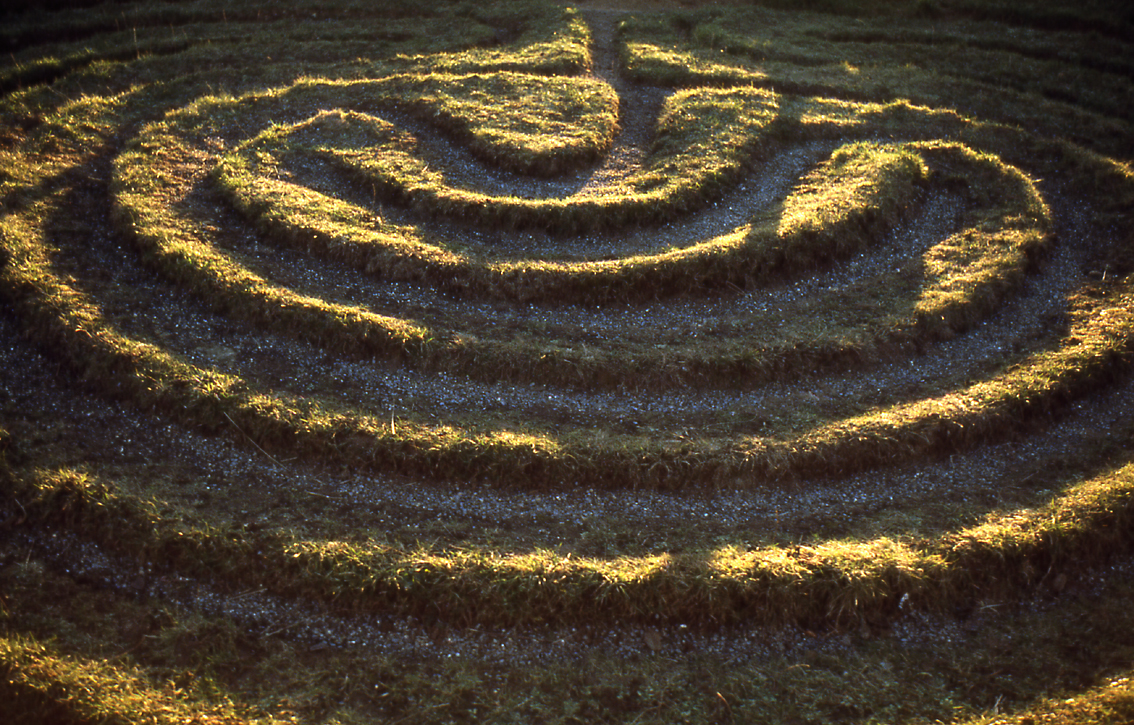
The City of Troy

Dalby-cum-Skewsby is a civil parish in the county of North Yorkshire, England. The population of the civil parish taken at the 2011 Census was less than 100. Details are included in the civil parish of Brandsby-cum-Stearsby. It is situated around 14 miles (23 km) north of York and comprises the hamlets of Dalby, Skewsby and Witherholm. It is part of the group of spring line villages to the south of the Howardian Hills.

From 1974 to 2023 it was part of the Hambleton District, it is now administered by the unitary North Yorkshire Council.

The name Dalby derives from the Old Norse dalrbȳ meaning 'village in a valley'. The name Skewsby derives from the Old Norse skógrsbȳ meaning 'village in a wood' or 'Skogr's village'.

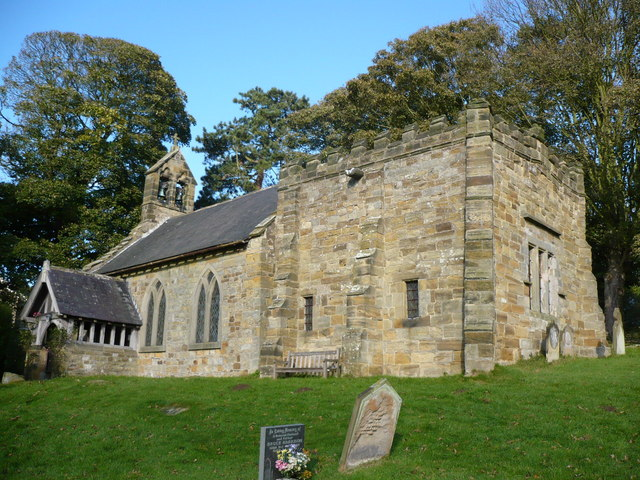
St Peter's church

St Peter's Church, Dalby, is a small stone building in the Norman style.

At grid reference SE625718 in Bonnygate Lane / High Lane is a turf maze called The City of Troy. It is described as the smallest turf maze in Europe.

The round barrow at grid reference SE62347199, 450 m north-east of Hagg Farm, is a scheduled ancient monument.

== See also ==
- Listed buildings in Dalby-cum-Skewsby
