= Leigh, Dorset =

Village and civil parish in Dorset, England

Coordinates: 50.8756°N 2.5445°W

Leigh
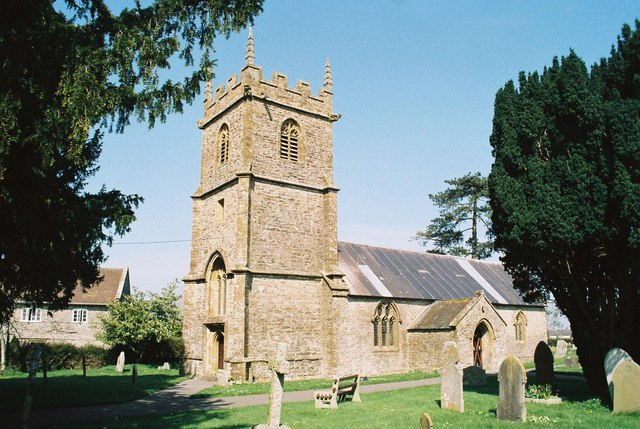
- Parish church of St Andrew

- Location within Dorset
- Population: 480
- OS grid reference: ST619086
- Unitary authority: Dorset
- Ceremonial county: Dorset
- Region: South West
- Country: England
- Sovereign state: United Kingdom
- Post town: Sherborne
- Postcode district: DT9
- Police: Dorset
- Fire: Dorset and Wiltshire
- Ambulance: South Western
- UK Parliament: West Dorset
- Website: Village website

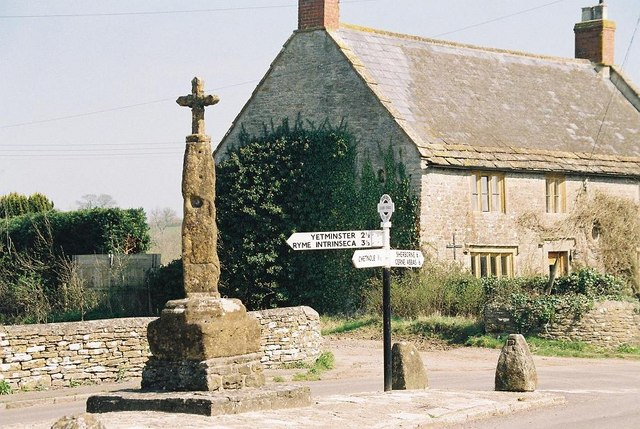
Leigh village cross

Leigh ( /laɪ/) is a village and civil parish in the county of Dorset in southern England, situated approximately 5 miles (8.0 km) south-southwest of Sherborne. It is known as the site of a former Miz Maze. In the 2011 census the parish had a population of 480.

== History ==
One mile southeast of the village is a 10-acre enclosure called 'The Castle'. The physical remnants on the ground indicate the previous existence of a castle here, although there are no historical records for the site.

Leigh has a village cross with a shaft dating from the 15th century. The parish church, dedicated to St Andrew, was previously a chapel of neighbouring Yetminster. It also dates from the 15th century, though was substantially altered—including the virtual rebuilding of the chancel—in 1854.

=== Miz Maze ===
In a field just south of the village are the remains of a turf labyrinth or "Miz Maze", an earthwork of uncertain origin that, centuries ago, may have been used for rituals and as a meeting place. The labyrinth was laid out on banks and in the 17th century was re-cut every year by the young men of the village. It was described in 1815 in the second edition of Hutchins' History of Dorset: "On an eminence in the common, about a quarter of a mile south from the village, is a maze of circular form, surrounded by a bank and ditch, and occupying an eighth part of an acre. The banks of earth of which it is composed are set almost close together, and are somewhat more than one foot in width and about half a foot in height."

Depositions from 1650–1664 state that the Miz Maze is where local witches used to meet. In 1879 the Dorset dialect poet William Barnes presented the Dorset Field Club with a paper in which he wrote "Many years ago I was told by a man of this neighbourhood that a corner of Leigh Common was called 'Witches Corner'; and long after that a friend gave me some old depositions on witchcraft ... one of the witches' sisterhood said that they sometimes met in Leigh Common." The last witch to be burned in England was reputed to have been arrested at a conference here in the 17th century and then executed at Maumbury Rings in Dorchester.

There used to be several of these labyrinths in Dorset, though this is the only one where traces still remain, and even here there is little evidence except for small disturbances in the grass surface which can be felt underfoot.

== Government ==
The parish council has involvement in the maintenance of parish facilities and local issues such as planning applications and conservation. It works with the local police, and neighbourhood watch groups on matters of crime, security, and traffic. Dorset Council is responsible for most of the local government services such as planning decisions and building control, local roads, council housing, markets and fairs, environmental health, refuse collection and recycling, education, social services, public transport, police and fire services, Trading Standards, waste disposal and strategic planning.

Leigh is in the West Dorset parliamentary constituency. Along with other villages it falls within the Cam Vale Electoral Ward.

== Geography ==
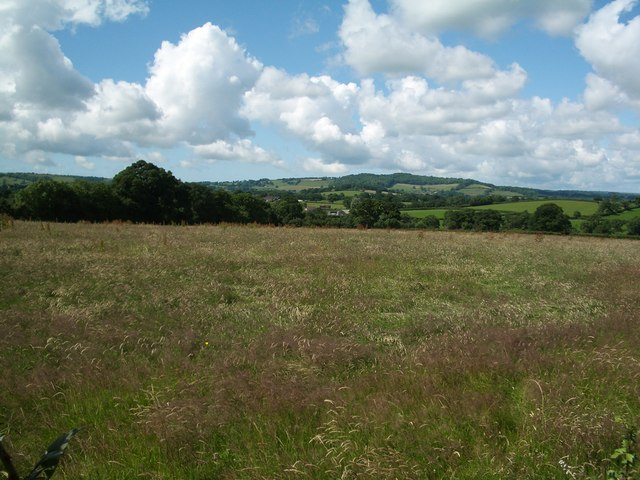
Meadow and pastureland south of the village

Leigh is situated in the Blackmore Vale, and measured directly, the village is 5 miles (8.0 km) south-southwest of Sherborne, 6 miles (9.7 km) southeast of Yeovil and 12 miles (19 km) north-northwest of Dorchester. The surrounding landscape is gently undulating and predominantly agricultural. The underlying geology is Oxford clay which here produces good quality pasture; the village was once known for producing cheese and cider, with at one time every farm possessing an orchard. One mile to the west of the village is the small Wriggle River, which drains into the River Yeo. Approximately 2.5 miles (4.0 km) to the south are the chalk hills of the Dorset Downs.

The nearest railway stations are on the Heart of Wessex Line at Chetnole, 1.5 miles (2.4 km) to the west-southwest, and Yetminster, 2 miles (3.2 km) to the northwest. The nearest main roads are the A37, 2.5 miles (4.0 km) to the west, and the A352, 2.5 miles (4.0 km) to the east.

== Demography ==
In the 2011 census the parish had 225 dwellings, 209 households and a population of 480.

The population of the parish in the censuses between 1921 and 2011 is shown in the table below:

Census Population of Leigh Parish 1921—2011 (except 1941)
| Census | 1921 | 1931 | 1951 | 1961 | 1971 | 1981 | 1991 | 2001 | 2011 |
|---|---|---|---|---|---|---|---|---|---|
| Population | 351 | 330 | 290 | 347 | 350 | 400 | 520 | 480 | 480 |
Source:Dorset County Council and Office for National Statistics

In 1861 the parish population was 465.
