= Adrian Fisher (maze designer) =

British puzzle designer

Adrian Fisher MBE is a British pioneer, inventor, designer and creator of mazes, puzzles, public art, tessellations, tilings, patterns and networks of many kinds. He is responsible for more than 700 mazes in 42 countries since 1979.

== Education ==
Before embarking on his career, Fisher was educated at Oundle School and Portsmouth Polytechnic.

== Career ==
Fisher has created 63 mirror mazes, and pioneered the extensive use of thematic chambers within mirror mazes, to achieve Mirror Maze Adventures. He has created 44 hedge mazes, and pioneered the use of Folly Towers, Tunnels, Walk-through Parting Waterfalls and Foaming Fountain Gates in mazes. He designed the world's first cornfield maize maze in 1993 and over 400 since, and has set 7 Guinness World Records. He has created water mazes, most notably the award-winning Beatles Maze (with Randoll Coate and Graham Burgess), and the Jersey Water Maze. He pioneered the genre of Path-in-Grass Mazes, and has created over a dozen around the world.

Fisher has invented several brick paving and mosaic tiling systems. For the Orang Utan Pavement Maze at Edinburgh Zoo, he invented a new paver tessellation using 7-sided and 5-sided (regular pentagon) bricks. The 'Fisher Paver', his second paving system uses 7-sided and 4-sided bricks and has been installed within paving projects on both sides of the Atlantic. Its benefits include being able to achieve dynamic and intriguing designs straight off the pallet with no cutting, thus offering excellent labour productivity when laying; it only requires one new 7-sided paver shape, yet its modular scale matches all industry-standard paving systems. Fisher's third paving system is the Mitre System, which he invented and patented together with the American mathematician Ed Pegg. Used for both mosaics and paving, their distinctive angular shapes create unique and pleasing images. Notable examples of its use in England include four Historic Mosaics with the Millennium Maze in Marlow, Buckinghamshire, and the 24 ft high SciTec Mosaic at Oundle School, Northamptonshire; and in America, the Tree of Life Mosaic in a private garden in Roxbury, Connecticut.

His Colour Mazes have been published in Scientific American, and walk-on examples can be found in the New York Hall of Science, Eureka Children's Museum in Halifax England, The Exploratory in Bristol, Cape Coral Children's Science Center in Florida, and over 30 other locations worldwide.

He designed the Star Map concept for London Buses, upon which was based the Spider Map system currently in use by London Buses.

In the 1980s, he co-designed the Blenheim Palace maze, that appears in the 2016 Bank of England £5 note.

Fisher designs puzzles for British newspapers and the World Puzzle Championships. The Guardian newspaper named him as one of Britain's top 50 designers. He has written over a dozen books on mazes and puzzles, in particular The Art of the Maze (Orion Books, 1990), Secrets of the Maze (Thames & Hudson) and The Amazing Book of Mazes (Thames & Hudson, 2006).

== Recognition ==
A major Maze Art Exhibition on Adrian Fisher's work was held at the Norton Museum of Art, West Palm Beach, Florida, from January to March 1997; it included the creation of full-size permanent mazes in the surrounding landscape, and the publication "Your Land is His Canvas".

Fisher was Director of Britain's "1991 – The Year of the Maze" Tourism Campaign. He was the recipient of the 2003 Resorgimento Award at the University of Tennessee at Knoxville, USA, on May 24, 2003, "in recognition of those who have demonstrated outstanding creativity, who have and will continue to change the world in which we live". He gave a TEDx talk in Cape May, New Jersey, USA, on the subject of "The Pursuit of Happiness". He was a judge of the 2009 International Labyrinth Competition in St Petersburg, Russia.

He and his wife Marie live in the village of Durweston in North Dorset, and within their grounds have a yew hedge maze with a central Folly Tower, mirrored chamber, spiral staircase and battlement walkway.

Fisher was appointed Member of the Order of the British Empire (MBE) in the 2020 Birthday Honours for services to international trade and the creative industry.

== Locations of selected mosaics designed by Adrian Fisher ==
- The George Jackson Mosaic, SciTec Building, Oundle School, Northamptonshire, England
- 'Tree of Life' Mosaic, Private Garden, Roxbury, Connecticut, USA
- 4 Mosaics within the Millennium Maze, Higginson Park, Marlow, England

== Locations of selected mazes designed by Adrian Fisher ==
=== UK, Mirror Mazes ===
- Birmingham Sea Life Centre Mirror Maze, Birmingham, England;
- Edinburgh Dungeon Mirror Maze, Scotland;
- London Dungeon Mirror Maze, England;
- Louis Tussauds Mirror Maze, Blackpool, Lancashire, England;
- Warwick Castle Dungeon Mirror Maze, Warwickshire, England;
- Wookey Hole Caves Mirror Maze, Somerset, England;
- York Dungeon Mirror Maze, York, England;
- 'Punch and Judy' Mirror Maze, Dreamland Theme Park, Margate, England, 2015;

=== UK, other mazes ===
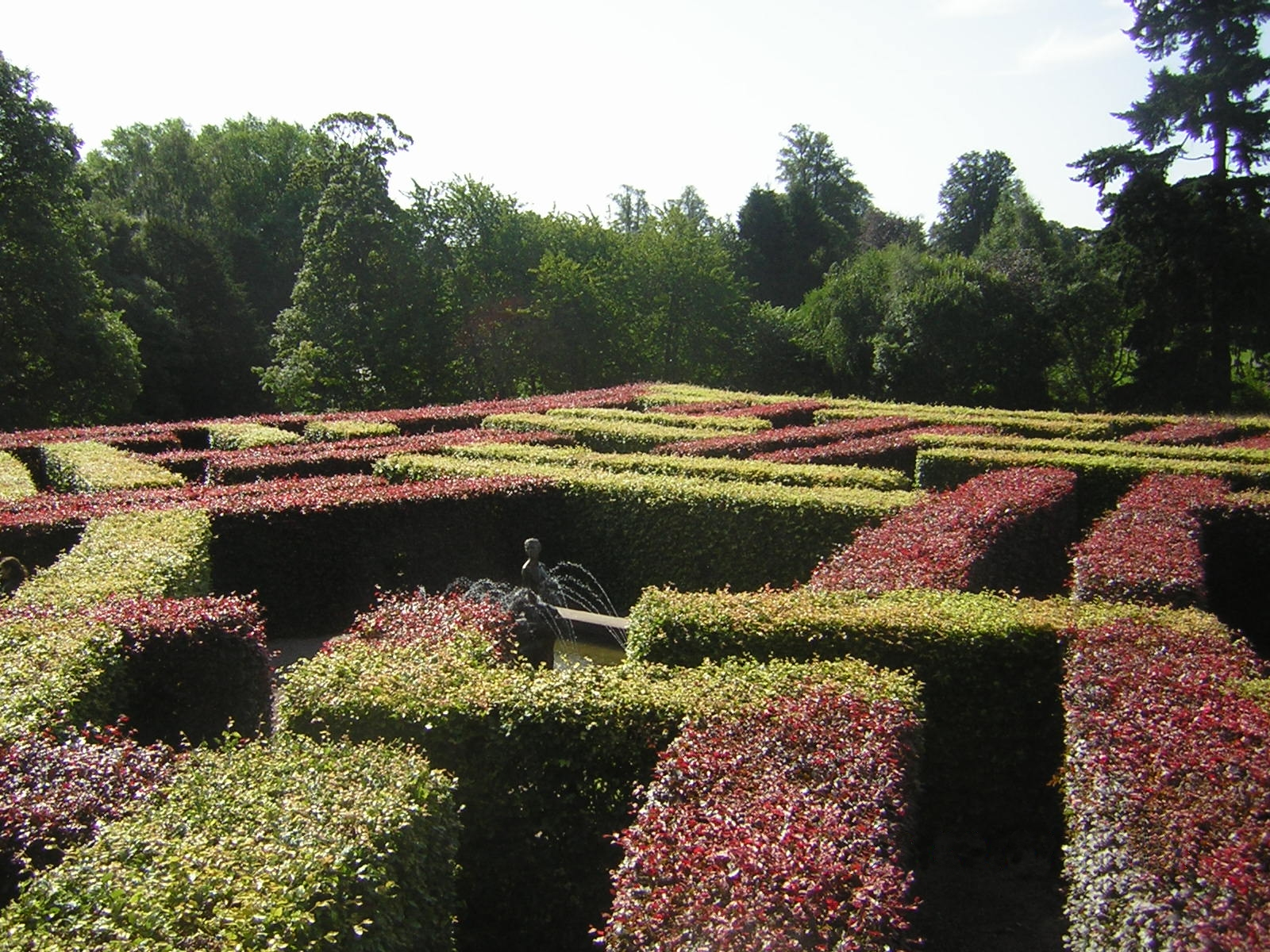
Scone Palace, hedge maze

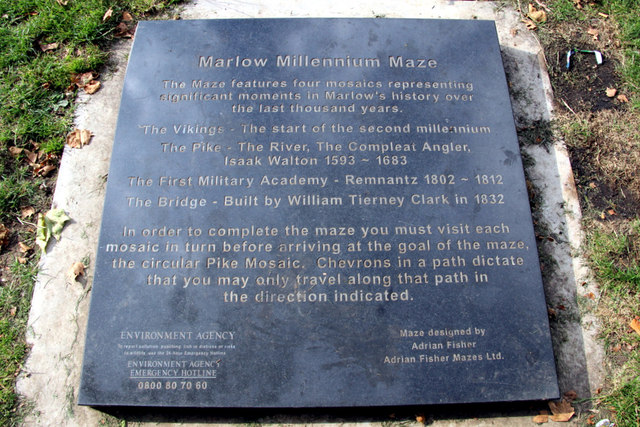
Plaque on the Millennium Maze of Marlow.

- Alnwick Garden Bamboo Labyrinth, Northumberland;
- Adventure Wonderland Hedge Maze, Dorset, England;
- Beatles Maze, 1984 International Garden Festival, Liverpool;
- Bicton Park Fence Maze, Devon, England;
- Blackpool Pleasure Beach Hedge Maze, Lancashire, England;
- Blenheim Palace Hedge Maze, Oxfordshire, England;
- Capel Manor Hedge Maze, Hertfordshire, England;
- Escot Park Hedge Maze, Devon, England;
- Greys Court 'Archbishop's Maze', Oxfordshire, England;
- Higginson Park Maze, Marlow, Buckinghamshire;
- Holywell Bay Fun Park Fence Maze, Cornwall, England;
- Kentwell Hall Pavement Maze, Suffolk, England;
- Leeds Castle Hedge Maze, Kent, England;
- Legoland Hedge Maze, Windsor, Berkshire, England;
- Leicester University Pavement Maze, England;
- Newquay Zoo Hedge Maze, Cornwall, England;
- Parham Park Maze, West Sussex, England;
- Scone Palace Hedge Maze, Perth, Scotland;
- Hedge Maze, Speke Hall (National Trust), Merseyside, England, 2011;
- Staunton Country Park Hedge Maze, Hampshire, England;

=== Europe ===
==== Czech Republic ====
- Castle Loucen: collection of 10 varied mazes and labyrinths within the landscape

==== Denmark ====
- Mirror Maze, Haunted House, Legoland, Billund, Denmark

==== Finland ====
- Maailma Fence Maze, Finland

==== France ====
- Chateau de Thoiry Hedge Maze, near Paris, France;
- Chateau de Colombier Hedge Maze, near Rodez, France;
- Peaugres Safari Park Mirror Maze, Annonay, France

==== Germany ====
- Berlin Sea Life Centre Mirror Maze, Berlin, Germany
- Hamburg Dungeon Mirror Maze, Hamburg, Germany
- 'Police Station Breakout' Mirror Maze, Legoland Deutschland, Germany, 2015

==== Poland ====
- World Labyrinth Bliziny, near Gdansk, Poland

==== Ireland ====
- Russborough House Hedge Maze, Blessington, Ireland

==== Italy ====
- Sigurta Gardens Hedge Maze, near Verona, Italy

==== Spain ====
- Laberintus Park Hedge Maze, in Humilladero, near Antequera, Spain; a 7,400 m² hedge maze designed by Adrian Fisher.

==== Jersey ====
- Castle View Gardens Water Maze, St. Peter, Jersey, Channel Islands

==== Netherlands ====
- Texel Island Maize Maze;
- Amsterdam Dungeon Mirror Maze, Netherlands;
- Amsterdam Forest Hedge Maze, Netherlands;
- Three Lands Point Hedge Maze, Vaals, Netherlands

==== North America ====
===== United States =====
- Davis Megamaze Maize Maze, Sterling, Massachusetts, USA;
- Amazing Chicago's Funhouse Maze on Navy Pier, Chicago, Illinois, USA;
- Skyline Caverns Mirror Maze, Front Royal, Virginia, USA;
- Mall of Georgia Paving Mazes, Atlanta, Georgia, USA;
- Noah's Ark Water Park Mirror Maze, Wisconsin Dells, USA;
- Norton Museum of Art Pavement Maze, West Palm Beach, USA;
- Norton Museum of Art Serpent Mound and Turf Labyrinth, West Palm Beach, USA
- Cannery Row Mirror Maze, Monterey, California, USA
- 'Palace of Sweets' Mirror Maze, Wildwood, New Jersey, USA
- 'Hannah's Maze of Mirrors', Hollywood Wax Museum, Pigeon Forge, Tennessee, USA
- Elusive Butterfly Mirror Maze, Butterfly Wonderland, Scottsdale, Arizona, USA, 2013
- 'Hannah's Maze of Mirrors', Hollywood Wax Museum, Myrtle Beach, South Carolina, USA, 2014
- Maze of the Planets, East Tawas, Michigan

==== Canada ====
- Larry's Party Maze, Grand Falls, New Brunswick, Canada, 2003;

===== Mexico =====
- Colour Maze, Wol-Ha Children's Museum, Mexico
- Coral Reef Mirror Maze, Gran Plaza Mall, Guadalajara, Mexico, 2011
- Candy Mirror Maze, Chetumal, Mexico, 2011
- Egyptian Mirror Maze, Monterrey, Mexico, 2011
- Pirate Mirror Maze, Pachuca, Mexico, 2011

==== South America ====
===== Colombia =====
- Bogota Children's Museum Maze Garden, Colombia, South America

===== Chile =====
- Space Adventure Mirror Maze, Kidzania, Santiago, Chile, South America

=== Asia ===
==== China ====
- Christmas Maze, Hong Kong, 2014
- Squirrel Mirror Maze, Harbin, China, 2015

==== Dubai ====
- The Maze Tower, Dubai, UAE; winner of Guinness World Record for world's tallest maze.

==== India ====
- Imax Theatre Mirror Maze, Hyderabad, India
- Disco Club Mirror Maze, Gurgaon, Delhi, India, 2011
- Ali Baba Mirror Maze, Esselworld Theme Park, Mumbai, 2015

==== Japan ====
- Huistenbosh Park Mirror Maze, Japan;
- Seibu Park Mirror Maze, Japan;
- Spanish Village Mirror Maze, Japan;
- Tobu Zoo Mirror Maze, Japan
- Tokyo Dome Mirror Maze, Japan
- Tokyo Tower Mirror Maze, Japan, 2015

==== Singapore ====
- Hedge Maze, The Jewel, Changi International Airport, Singapore
- Mirror Maze, The Jewel, Changi International Airport, Singapore
- Professor Crackitt's Mirror Maze, Singapore Science Centre, Singapore

==== South Korea ====
- Jeju Island Hedge Maze, South Korea (Kimnyung Maze)

==== Thailand ====
- Ripleys Mirror Maze, Pattaya, Thailand

==== Vietnam ====
- Mirror Maze, Vietnam

== See also ==
- Randoll Coate – Fisher's original partner in maze design
