= Maze =

Puzzle game

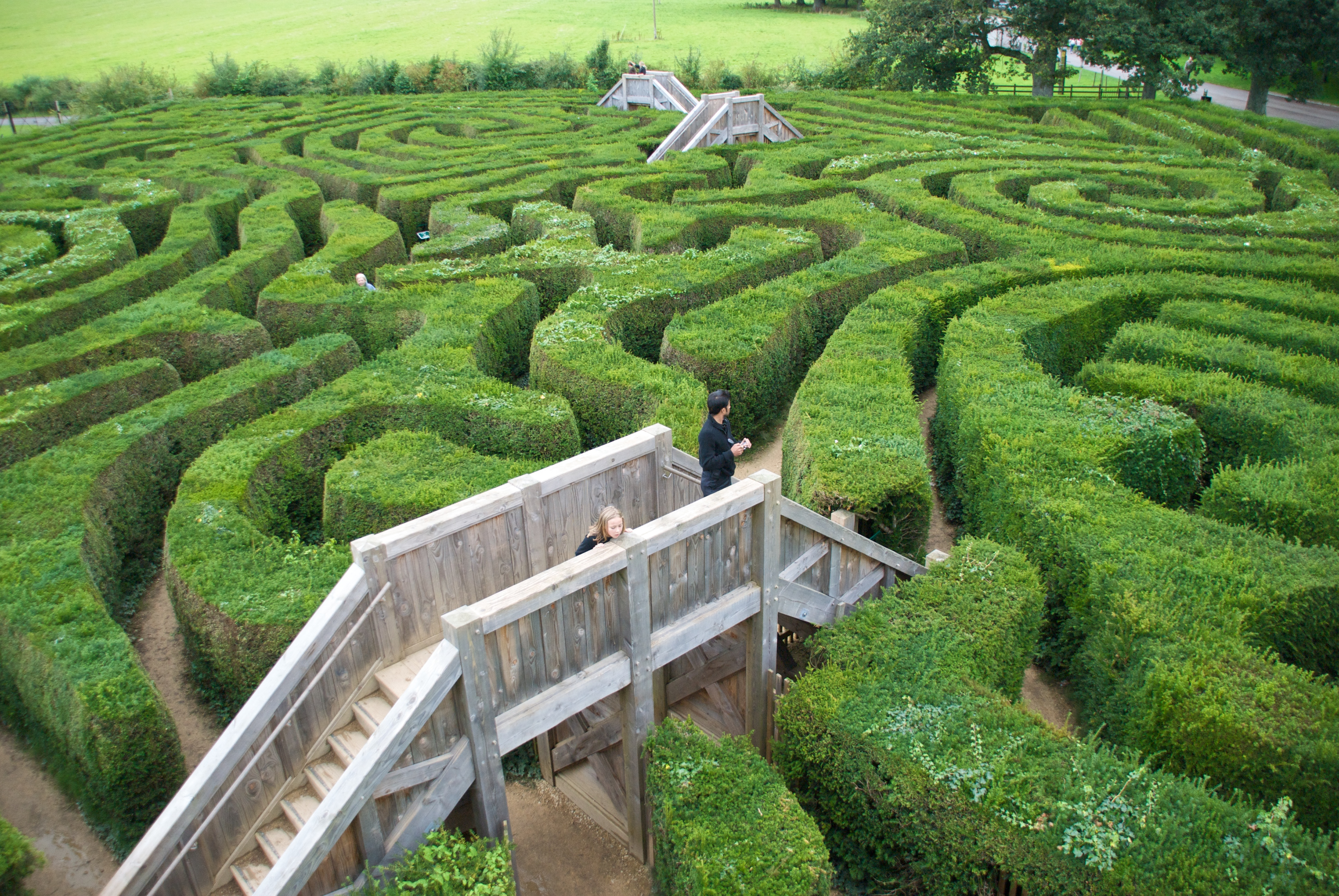
A hedge maze at Longleat stately home in England

A maze is a path or collection of paths, typically from an entrance to a goal. The word is used to refer both to branching tour puzzles through which the solver must find a route, and to simpler non-branching ("unicursal") patterns that lead unambiguously through a convoluted layout to a goal. The term "labyrinth" is generally synonymous with "maze", but can also connote specifically a unicursal pattern. The pathways and walls in a maze are typically fixed, but puzzles in which the walls and paths can change during the game are also categorised as mazes or tour puzzles.

== Construction ==
Mazes have been built with a variety of materials. Some are relatively permanent, like hedges, turf, walls, rooms, tiles, and paving stones or bricks. Others are deliberately transitory, like corn stalks, straw bales, books, snow, or in fields of crops such as corn or maize. Maize mazes can be very large; they are usually kept only for one growing season, so they can be different each year, and are promoted as seasonal tourist attractions.

Indoors, mirror mazes are another form of maze, in which many of the apparent pathways are imaginary routes seen through multiple reflections in mirrors. Another type of maze consists of a set of rooms linked by doors (so a passageway is just another room in this definition). Players enter at one spot, and exit at another, or the idea may be to reach a certain spot in the maze. Mazes can also be printed or drawn on paper to be followed by a pencil or fingertip.

A small maze with one entrance and one exit

== Generation ==
Maze generation is the act of designing the layout of passages and walls within a maze. There are many different approaches to generating mazes, with various maze generation algorithms for building them, either by hand or automatically by computer.

There are two main mechanisms used to generate mazes. In "carving passages", one marks out the network of available routes. In building a maze by "adding walls", one lays out a set of obstructions within an open area.

== Solution ==
Maze solving is the act of finding a route through the maze from the start to finish. Some maze-solving methods are designed to be used inside the maze by a traveler with no prior knowledge of the maze, whereas others are designed to be used by a person or computer program that can see the whole maze at once.

The mathematician Leonhard Euler was one of the first to analyze plane mazes mathematically, and in doing so made the first significant contributions to the branch of mathematics known as topology.

Mazes containing no loops are known as "standard", or "perfect" mazes, and are equivalent to a tree in graph theory. Thus many maze-solving algorithms are closely related to graph theory. Intuitively, if one pulled and stretched out the paths in the maze in the proper way, the result could be made to resemble a tree.

== Psychology experiments ==
Mazes are often used in psychology experiments to study spatial navigation and learning. Such experiments typically use rats or mice. Examples are:

- Barnes maze
- Morris water maze
  - Oasis maze
- Radial arm maze
- Elevated plus maze
- T-maze

== Types ==
A fractal maze (top) with 3 iterations (left) and a solution (right)

Ball-in-a-maze puzzles
Dexterity puzzles which involve navigating a ball through a maze or labyrinth.

Fractal maze
A maze containing holes inside which the maze is indefinitely repeated at a smaller scale.
Hamilton maze
A maze in which the goal is to find the unique Hamiltonian cycle – an endless loop passing once through every marked vertex.

Logic mazes
These are like standard mazes except they use rules other than "don't cross the lines" to restrict motion.

Loops and traps maze
A maze that features one-way doors. The doors can lead to the correct path or create traps that divert you from the correct path and lead you to the starting point. The player may not return through a door through which he has entered, so dead ends may be created. The path is a series of loops interrupted by doors. Through the use of reciprocal doors, the correct path can intersect the incorrect path on a single plane.

Picture maze
A standard maze that forms a picture when solved.

Turf mazes and mizmazes
A pattern like a long rope folded up, without any junctions or crossings.

=== Gallery ===
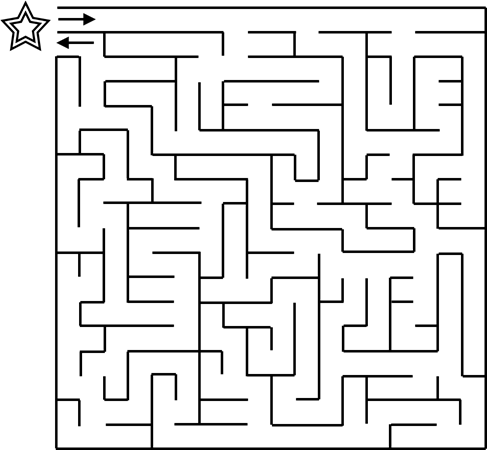
Standard maze: Find a path from and back to the star.

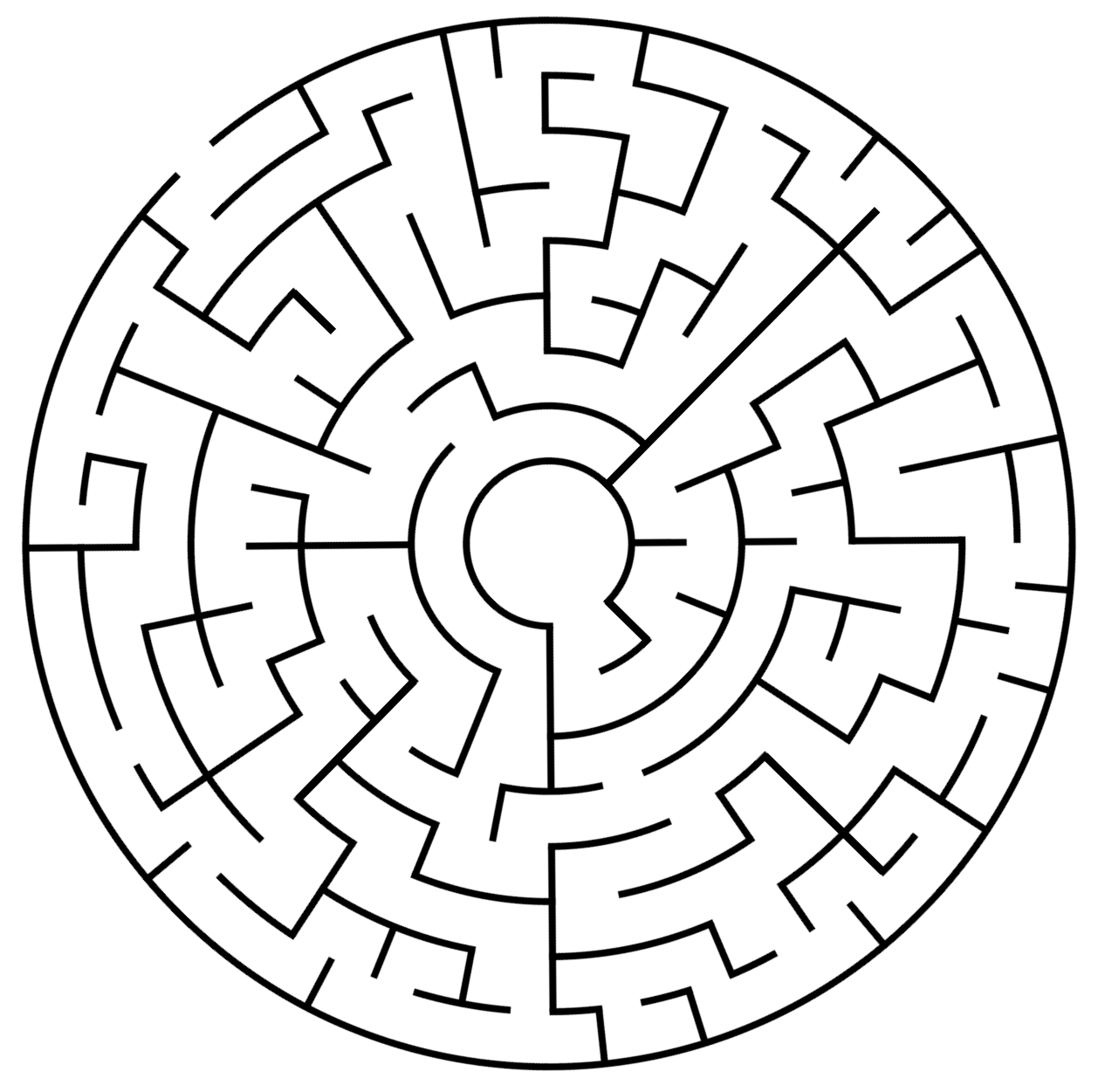
Circular maze type: Find a route to the centre of the maze.

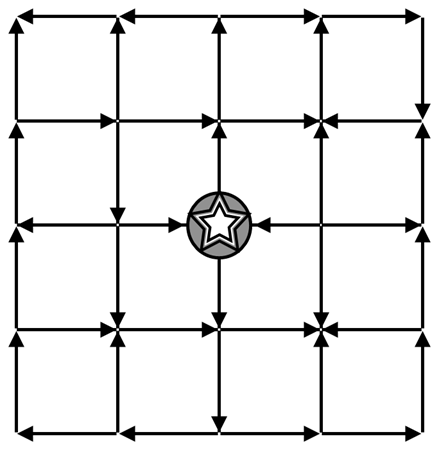
Loops and traps maze: Follow the arrows from and back to the star

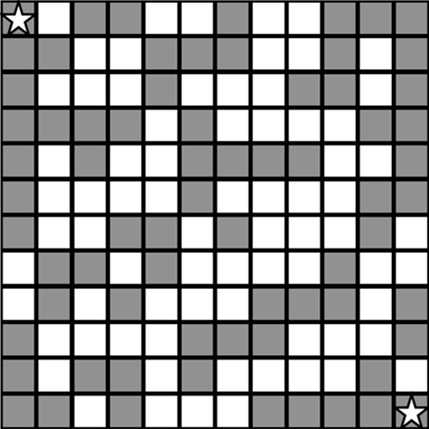
Block maze: Fill in four blocks to make a road connecting the stars. No diagonals.

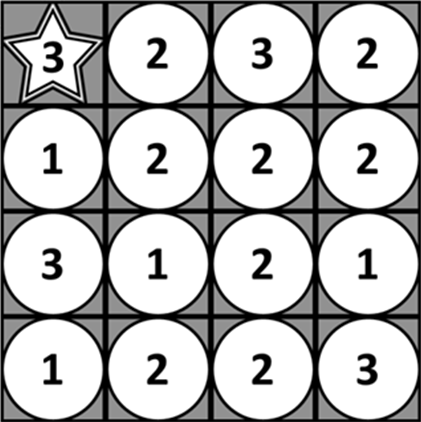
Number maze: Begin and end at the star. Using the number in your space, jump that number of blocks in a straight line to a new space. No diagonals.

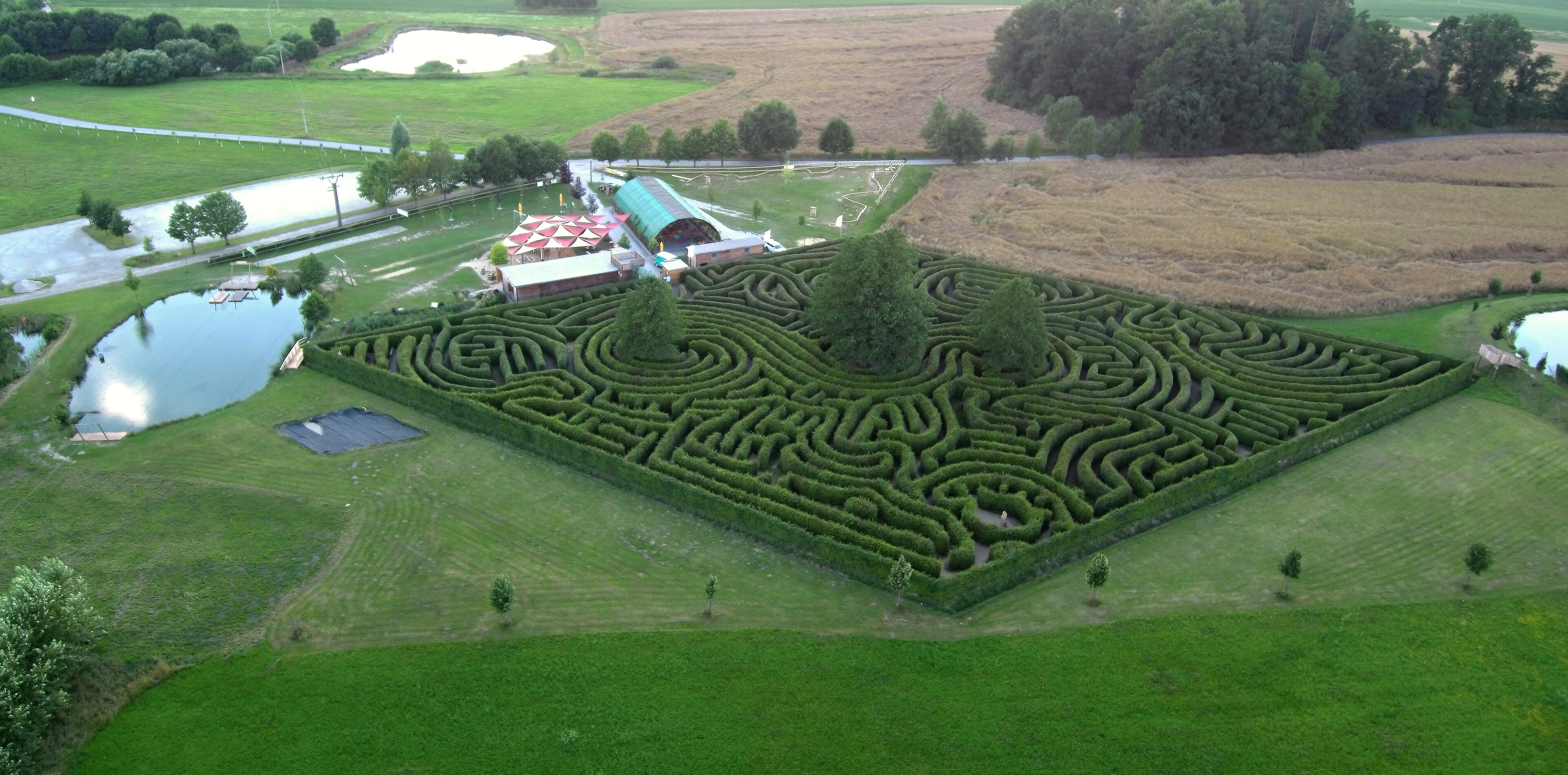
Obludiste – a hedge maze in the Czech republic

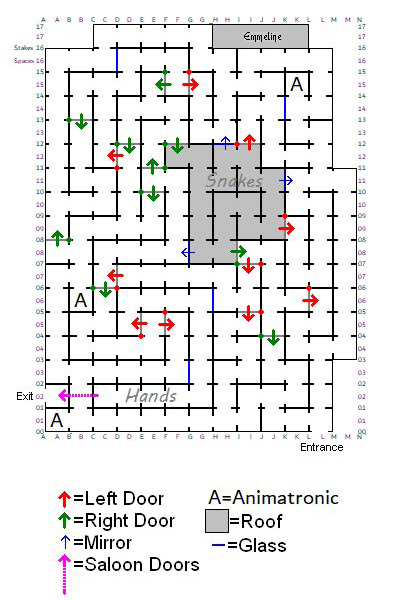
Diagram of a loops and traps maze

Picture maze (animation)

== Public attractions ==
=== Asia ===
==== Dubai ====
- Gardens Shopping Mall, Dubai (world's largest indoor maze)

India

- Bhulbhulayia

==== Japan ====
- Hikimi no Meiro, Kiso, Nagano, Japan
- Kyodai Meiro Palladium, Nikkō, Tochigi, Japan
- Sendai Hi-Land, Sendai, Miyagi, Japan
- Shirahama Energy Land, Shirahama, Wakayama, Japan

=== Pacific ===
==== New Zealand ====
- Amazing Maze n' Maize
- The Great Maze at Puzzling World

=== Europe ===
==== Austria ====
- Schönbrunn Palace, Vienna, has a large hedge maze in its gardens.
- Swarovski Crystal World, Wattens, Tyrol, has a hand-shaped hedge maze in its gardens.

==== Belgium ====
- Loppem Castle maze

==== Czech Republic ====
- Obludiste, Dolni Pena (Jindrichuv Hradec) - hedge maze 6.000 m^{2}

==== Denmark ====
- Samsø Labyrinten (The world's largest permanent maze, 60.000 m^{2})

==== Germany ====
- Hortus Vitalis – Der Irrgarten, Bad Salzuflen (hedge maze)

==== Greece ====
- Labyrinth Park near Hersonissos, Crete (extends to approximately 1.300 m^{2})

==== Italy ====
- Castello di Masino, Caravino 10010, Torino, Italia
- Porsenna's Maze, Chiusi, Tuscany (see Pliny's Italian labyrinth)
- Villa Pisani, Stra, near Venice (45.409587°N 12.013131°E)
- The labyrinth of Franco Maria Ricci at Fontanellato (44.853989°N 10.146446°E)

==== Netherlands ====
- Waterlabyrinth, Nijmegen, designed by Klaus van de Locht, 1981 (51.85016°N 5.860471°E)
- Doolhof Ruurlo, Ruurlo, designed by Daniel Marot, based on the design for Hampton Court Maze (52.078266°N 6.433654°E)

==== Portugal ====
- Parque do Arnado, Ponte de Lima, District of Viana do Castelo
- Parque de São Roque, District of Porto
- Forest Reserve of Pinhal da Paz, São Miguel Island, Azores

==== Spain ====
- Alcázar of Seville, Seville
- Corn Laberynth in the Camino de Santiago, León
- Parc del laberint d'Horta, Barcelona, (41.440235°N 2.145769°E)
- Parc de la Torreblanca, Esplugues de Llobregat (41.37856°N 2.054628°E)
- Parque de El Capricho, Madrid
- Laberinto de Villapresente, Cantabria. With 5,625 sqm, it is the largest maze in Spain.
- Parque de Tentegorra, Murcia
- Royal Palace of La Granja de San Ildefonso, Segovia (40.5352°N 3.5956°W)

==== United Kingdom ====
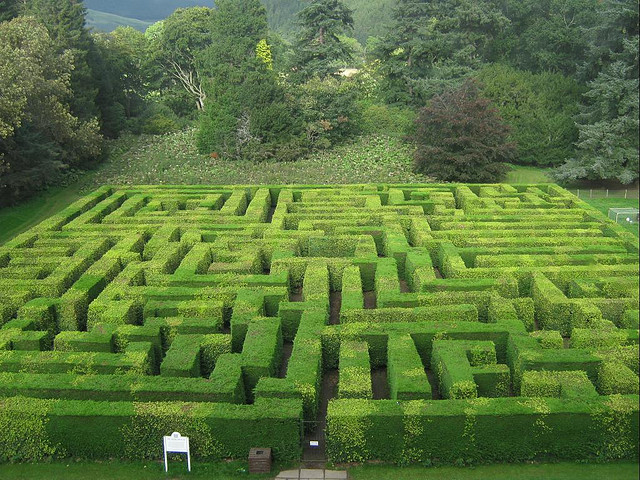
Traquair House Maze, Scotland

- Blake House Craft Centre, Braintree, Essex, England (Open July–September)
- Carnfunnock Country Park, Northern Ireland. A hedge maze in the shape of Northern Ireland and winner of 1985 Design a Maze competition.
- Castlewellan, Northern Ireland, world's largest permanent hedge maze
- Chatsworth House garden maze, planted with 1,209 yews.
- Cliveden House Originally laid out in 1894, the maze was restored and re-opened to the public in 2011, consisting of 1100 Yew trees.
- Crystal Palace Park, South London. Laid out in the 1870s, this is the largest maze in London.
- Glendurgan Garden, Cornwall. A cherry laurel hedge maze created in 1833.
- Hampton Court Maze. A famous historic maze in the Palace gardens.
- Hever Castle Maze, Hever, Kent. Yew tree maze and a splashing water maze
- Hoo Hill Maze, Shefford, Bedfordshire, England
- Norwich Cathedral, Norfolk, England. A labyrinth in the Cloister Garth. Laid to commemorate the Golden Jubilee of HM Queen Elizabeth II in 2002.
- Richings Park Amazing Maize Maze, Richings Park, near Heathrow, England (Open July–September)
- Saffron Walden, an Essex town with its historic Bridge End Gardens hedge maze and the England's largest turf maze
- Saltwell Park, Gateshead, Tyne and Wear, England. A yew-tree maze restored to its original condition in 2005 and open to the public during park opening hours.
- Somerleyton Hall, Suffolk, England. A yew hedge maze designed and planted in 1846 by William Nesfield.
- Traquair House, Peeblesshire, Scotland. A beech tree hedge maze designed by John Schofield.
- York Maze, near RAF Elvington, with a different design each year

=== North America ===
Public maze at Wild Adventures theme park, Valdosta, Georgia, United States. It was removed before the 2010 season.

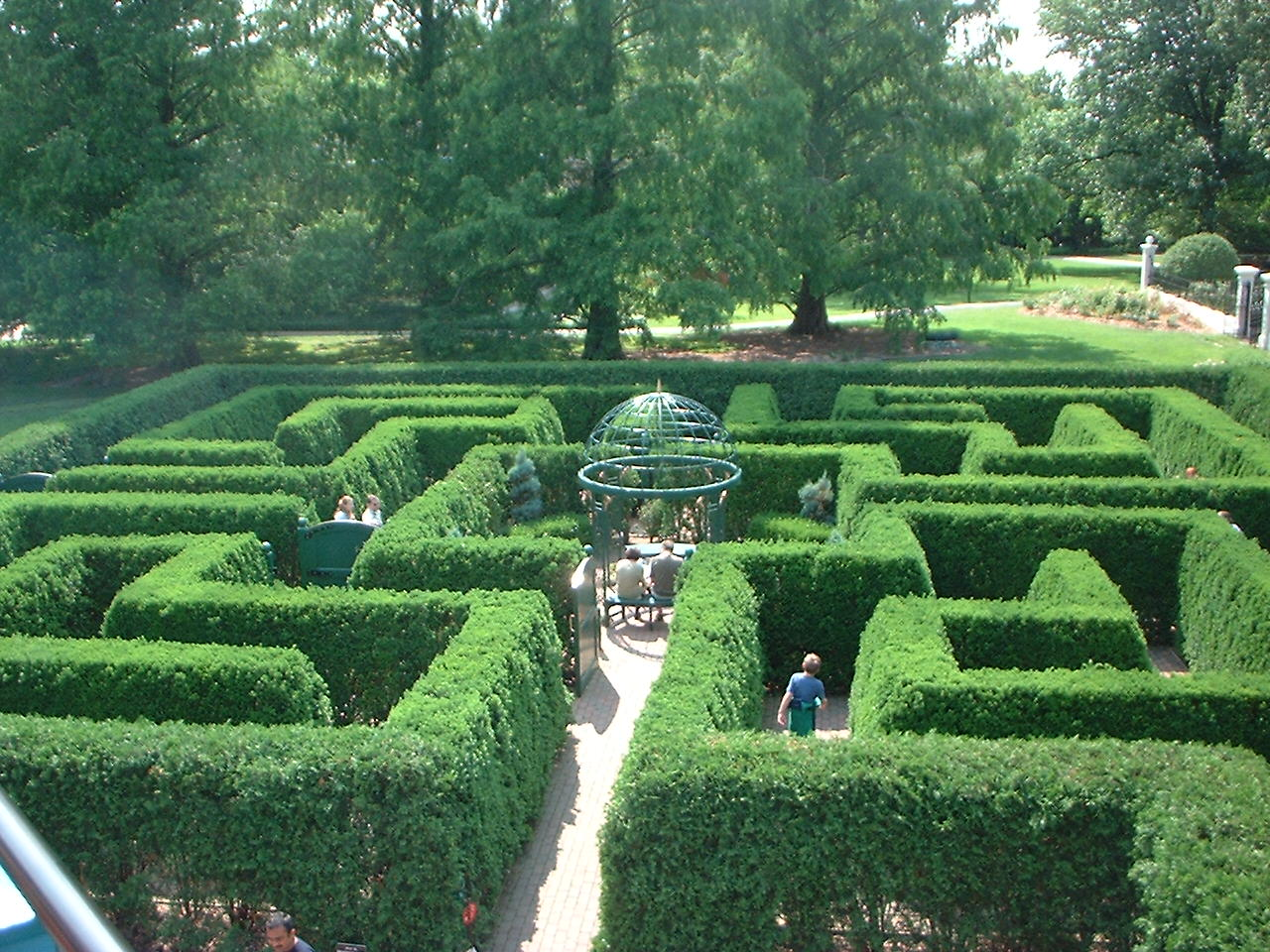
Maze at Missouri Botanical Garden in St. Louis

==== Canada ====
- In 2012, the Kraay Family Farm in Alberta, Canada created the world's largest QR code in the form of a massive corn maze, popularly known as The Edmonton Corn Maze.

==== United States ====
- The Stanley Hotel in Estes Park, Colorado in 2015 installed a 10,100-square-foot hedge maze on its front lawn, using 1,600 to 2,000 Alpine Currant hedge bushes. Previously the hotel had no maze, though one was featured prominently in the 1980 film adaption of Stephen King's novel The Shining, which is set at the hotel.
- Dole Pineapple Plantation, Oahu.
- Tanglewood Music Center Hedge Maze, Lenox and Stockbridge, Massachusetts.
- The Wooz was a maze attraction opened in 1988 in Vacaville, California by Sun Creative System, a Japanese company that had seen success with the concept in Japan. Despite initial interest, high admission cost and hot summers led the park to close in 1992. The failure of the Wooz scuttled Sun Creative System's plans for additional maze attractions in the U.S.

=== South Africa ===
Chartwell Castle in Johannesburg claims to have the biggest known uninterrupted hedgerow maze in the Southern world, with over 900 conifers. It covers about 6000 sq.m. (approximately 1.5 acres), which is around 5 times bigger than The Hampton Court Maze. The center is about 12m × 12m. The maze was designed and laid out by Conrad Penny.

=== Caribbean ===
==== Cuba ====
The colonial city of Camagüey, Cuba, founded in 1528, layout resembles a real maze, with narrow, short streets always turning in one direction or another. After pirate Henry Morgan burned the city in the 17th century, it was designed like a maze so attackers would find it hard to move around inside the city. It is a UNESCO World Heritage Site.

=== South America ===
==== Brazil ====
- Labirinto Verde, Nova Petrópolis, (Circular hedge maze built in 1989; Latitude 29°22'32.71"S Longitude 51°06'43.68"W)

== In popular culture ==
=== Video games ===
Maze game is a video game genre first described by journalists during the 1980s to describe any game in which the entire playing field is a maze. The player must escape monsters, outrace an opponent, or navigate the maze within a time limit. After the release of Namco's Pac-Man in 1980, many maze games followed its conventions of completing a level by traversing all paths and a way of temporarily turning the tables on pursuers.

=== Television ===
- Both Nubeluz and American Gladiators, from Peru and the United States respectively, featured a giant life-size maze used in competition. The object on both programs was for the contestants to find their way from the entrance to the exit as quickly as possible. On Nubeluz, the contestants took turns running through the maze and had a maximum of 1 minute to reach the exit; on American Gladiators, both contestants ran through the maze simultaneously and were given 45 seconds to find the correct solution. The giant maze was part of the game rotation on both programs concurrently, and was also retired from both programs simultaneously.

=== The Shining ===
- The 1980 film adaptation of Stephen King's 1977 novel, The Shining, includes a scene featuring Jack and Danny Torrance in a hedge maze.

== See also ==
- Celtic maze
- Stone labyrinths of Bolshoi Zayatsky Island
- Troy Town
