= Corn maze =

Mazes produced from patterns cut or grown into farmland

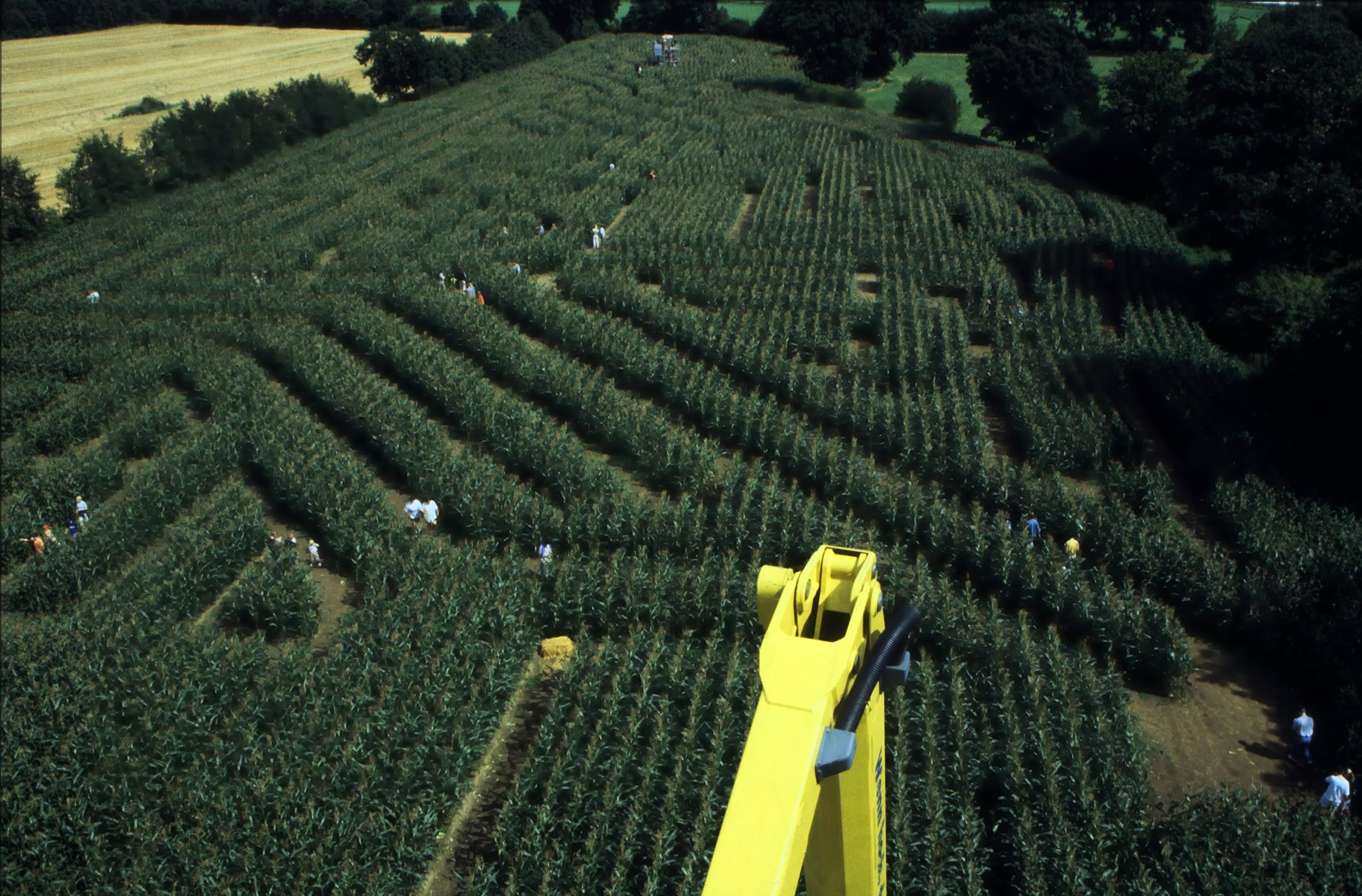
A corn maze in Germany

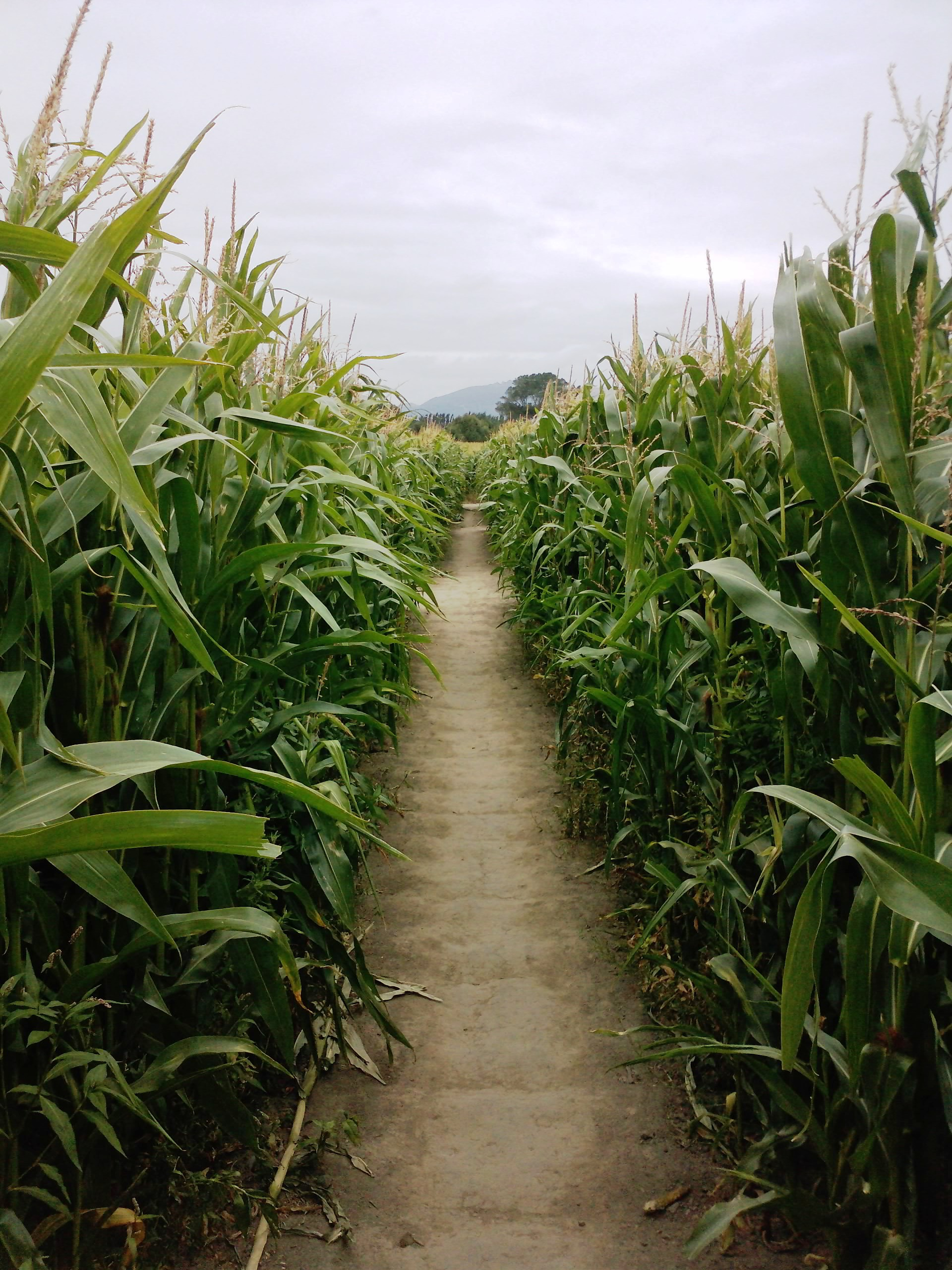
A view from inside a corn maze near Christchurch, New Zealand

A corn maze or maize maze is a maze cut out of a corn field. Corn mazes have become popular agritourism attractions in North America, and are a way for farms to generate tourist income. Corn mazes appear in many different designs. Most have a path which goes all around the whole pattern, either to end in the middle or to come back out again, with various false trails diverging from the main path. In the United Kingdom, they are known as maize mazes, and are especially popular with farms in the east of England.

These mazes are normally combined with other farm attractions of interest to families and day trippers. These attractions may include hay rides, a petting zoo, play areas for children, and picnic areas. Each year a few of the mazes are featured in national newspapers and TV.

In the U.S., corn mazes are typically cut down around the first week of November; in the UK typically in September after children return to school.

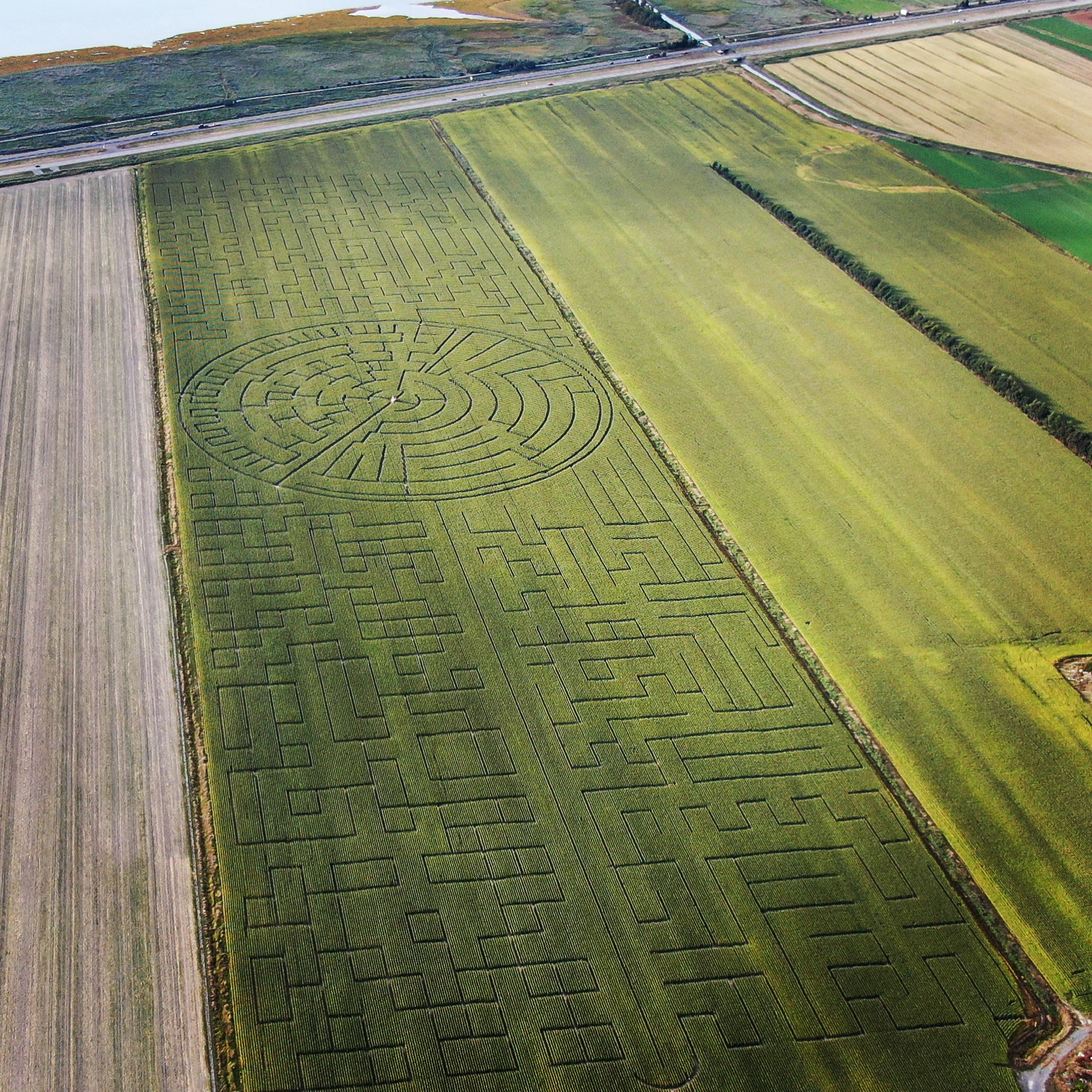
The largest corn maze in the world, according to Guinness World Records. Mazes can be designed artistically.

== Size ==
Mazes may cover 2–9 acres (0.8–3.6 hectares). Larger mazes can have more design details.

As of January 2023, the Guinness World Record for the largest temporary corn or crop maze was 65.8 acres (26.6 hectares), created by Luc Pelletier in La Pocatière, Québec, Canada, in October 2022.

In 2012, a maze in Lacombe, Alberta, Canada earned the Guinness World Record for the largest scannable QR code on Earth. It was about 2.9 hectares (7.2 acres).

== Designs ==
Designs may be simple lines, or they may produce an overall image that can be seen from above. Many are based on artistic designs such as characters from movies. Some mazes are even created to tell stories or to portray a particular theme. Complex designs include those featuring popular singers, movies, farming themes, patriotic themes, or historical events.

Complex designs may be produced by a specialty company.

A large maze may be broken into several sections. This allows people to choose a path with the length and complexity that they want. For example, a family with small children may want to choose a shorter, simpler portion, and others may want to do multiple sections. An unusually large corn maze at Stoney Brook Farms in the US, which covers an area of 110 acres (45 ha), has a total of 15 miles (24 km) of pathways.

The designs may be cut earlier in the season, when the corn plants are shorter (about 12 inches (30 cm) tall), or during the summer, when they are taller. In other cases, the corn is planted to form the maze, using GPS mapping technology.

== Revenue ==
Corn mazes are usually created because they can bring money into a family farm. Some farms also donate a portion of the proceeds to a charity.

== History ==
The first full-size corn maze is said to have been created in Annville, Pennsylvania in 1993, although the Los Angeles Times mentioned the existence of a corn maze at the R&H Ranch, in Lancaster, California, in 1989.

== Creation ==
In order for farmers to create a corn maze they must carefully plan their production, design, and marketing techniques in advance:

1. Planting the correct variety of corn is important for the success of a corn maze. Farmers must consider stalk strength and height when selecting the right hybrid to plant.
2. Farmers must watch for stalk rot since it is one of the most frequently observed diseases. Key factors for stalk rot include improper fertilization, moisture stress, and disease development.
3. Moderate plant population (about 20,000 plants per acre) would be considered ideal. If moderate plant population is not followed crop crowding can occur.
4. Since farmers planting for corn mazes are not growing the crop for maximum yield they should not apply too much nitrogen fertilizer. Rutgers Cooperative Research and Extension recommends the total nitrogen rate for the season should not exceed about 125 pounds per acre (140 kg per hectare).
5. Corn maze crops should be planted from mid to late May in the northern hemisphere, or mid to late November in the southern hemisphere. This is two to three weeks later than crops being planted for grain.
6. When cutting the walkways farmers must cut the internal growing point of the stalk off to avoid regrowth. Some farmers use herbicides, roto-tillers, or mowers to cut the walkways.

== See also ==
- Hedge maze
- Straw maze
- Crop circle
- Halloween Cornfield Maze
- Picture maze
