= Hedge maze =

Outdoor garden maze or labyrinth

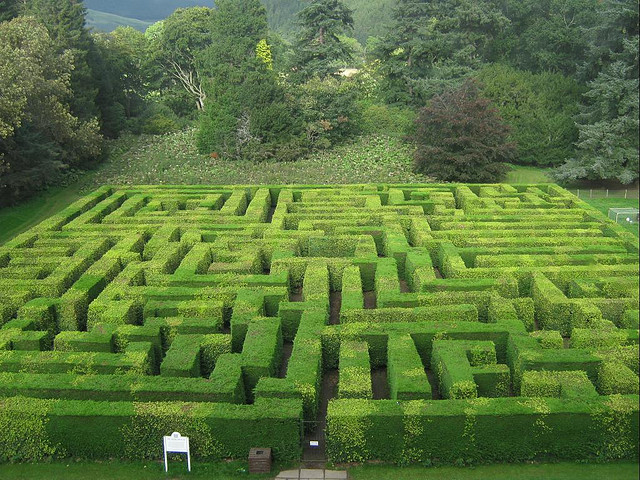
The maze at Traquair

A hedge maze is an outdoor garden maze or labyrinth in which the "walls" or dividers between passages are made of vertical hedges. The first hedge mazes were built in the mid-16th century, as an evolution of the knot gardens popular in England, and were originally intended to provide a single walking path throughout a garden but developed into designs with branching paths by the late 17th century. Hedge maze designs first appeared in the work of Italian architects in 1460, though the peak of maze construction occurred between the 16th and 18th centuries. They have generally increased in complexity in modern times, and are depicted in literature, television, film, and video games.

== History ==
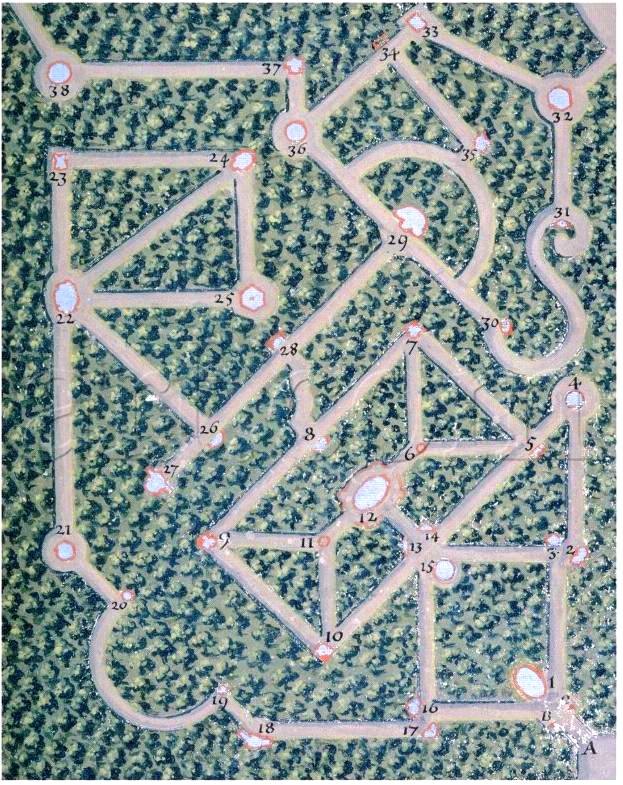
The labyrinth of Versailles was a hedge maze in the Gardens of Versailles, a royal château in France. Pictured is Labyrinte de Versailles by Charles Perrault with engravings by Leclerc and coloured by Jacques Bailly, circa the late 17th century

Hedge mazes evolved from the knot gardens of Renaissance Europe, and were first constructed during the mid-16th century. These early mazes were very low, initially planted with evergreen herbs, but, over time, dwarf box became a more popular option due to its robustness. Italian architects had been sketching conceptual garden labyrinths as early as 1460, and hundreds of mazes were constructed in Europe between the 16th and 18th centuries.

Initially, the hedge maze was not intended to confuse, but to provide a unicursal walking path. Puzzle-like hedge mazes featuring dead ends and tall hedges arrived in England during the reign of King William III of England. They were now part of the bosquet or wilderness part of the garden, and extended area of highly artificial formal woodland, with groups of trees enclosed by hedges. It was possible to get lost in the much-admired labyrinth of Versailles, built for Louis XIV of France in 1677 and destroyed in 1778. This maze was adorned with thirty-nine hydraulic sculpture groups depicting Aesop's fables. The oldest surviving puzzle hedge maze, at Hampton Court Palace in Surrey, England, was built for King William in the late 17th century. Its distinctive trapezoidal shape is due to pre-existing paths running alongside the maze.

In modern times, hedge mazes have increased in complexity. A hedge maze at Longleat House in Wiltshire, England, designed in 1978, features a three-dimensional maze that uses bridges and a grid-less layout to confuse visitors.

== Notable public hedge mazes ==
The layout of Hampton Court Maze, a typical hedge maze, UK

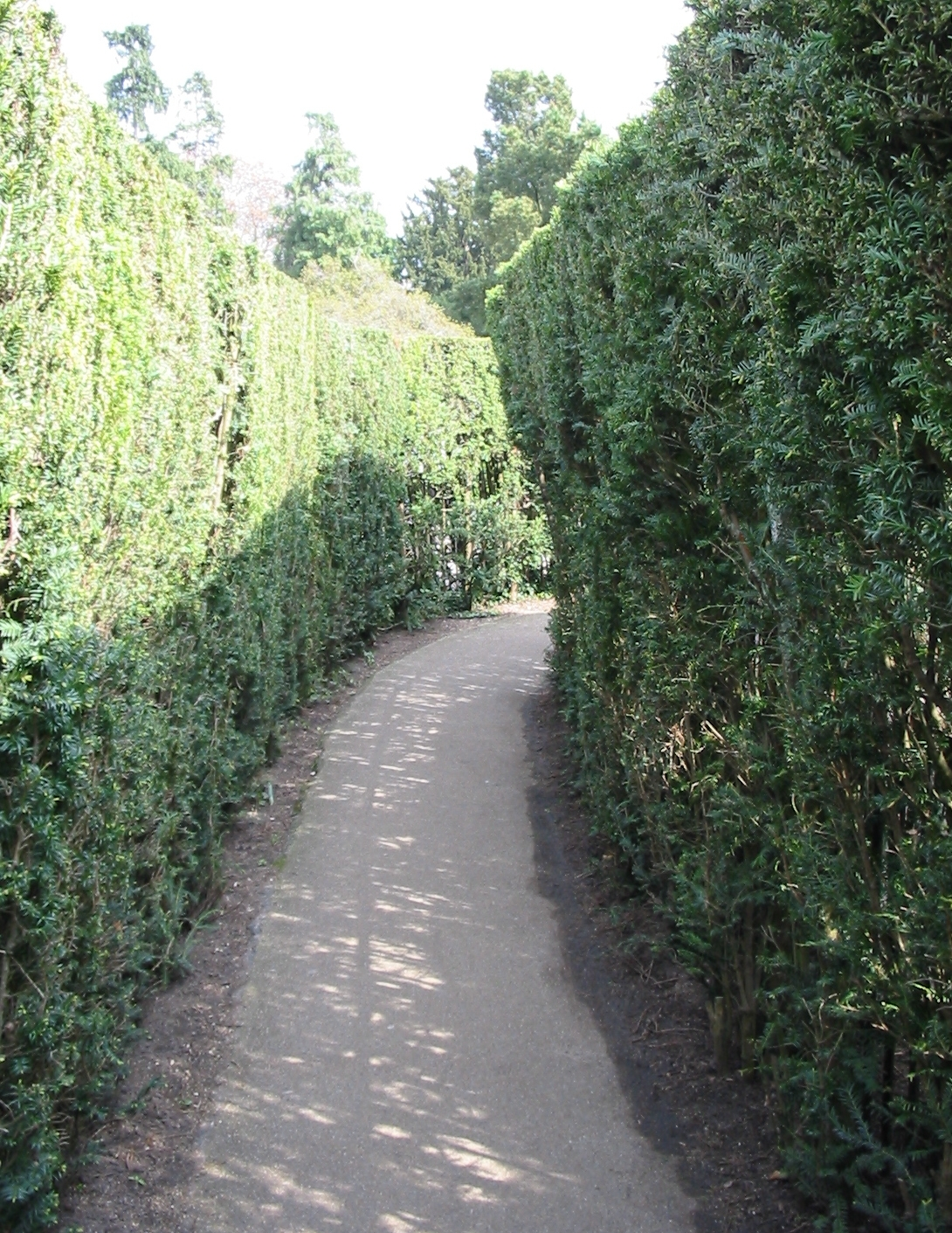
Inside Hampton Court hedge maze, UK

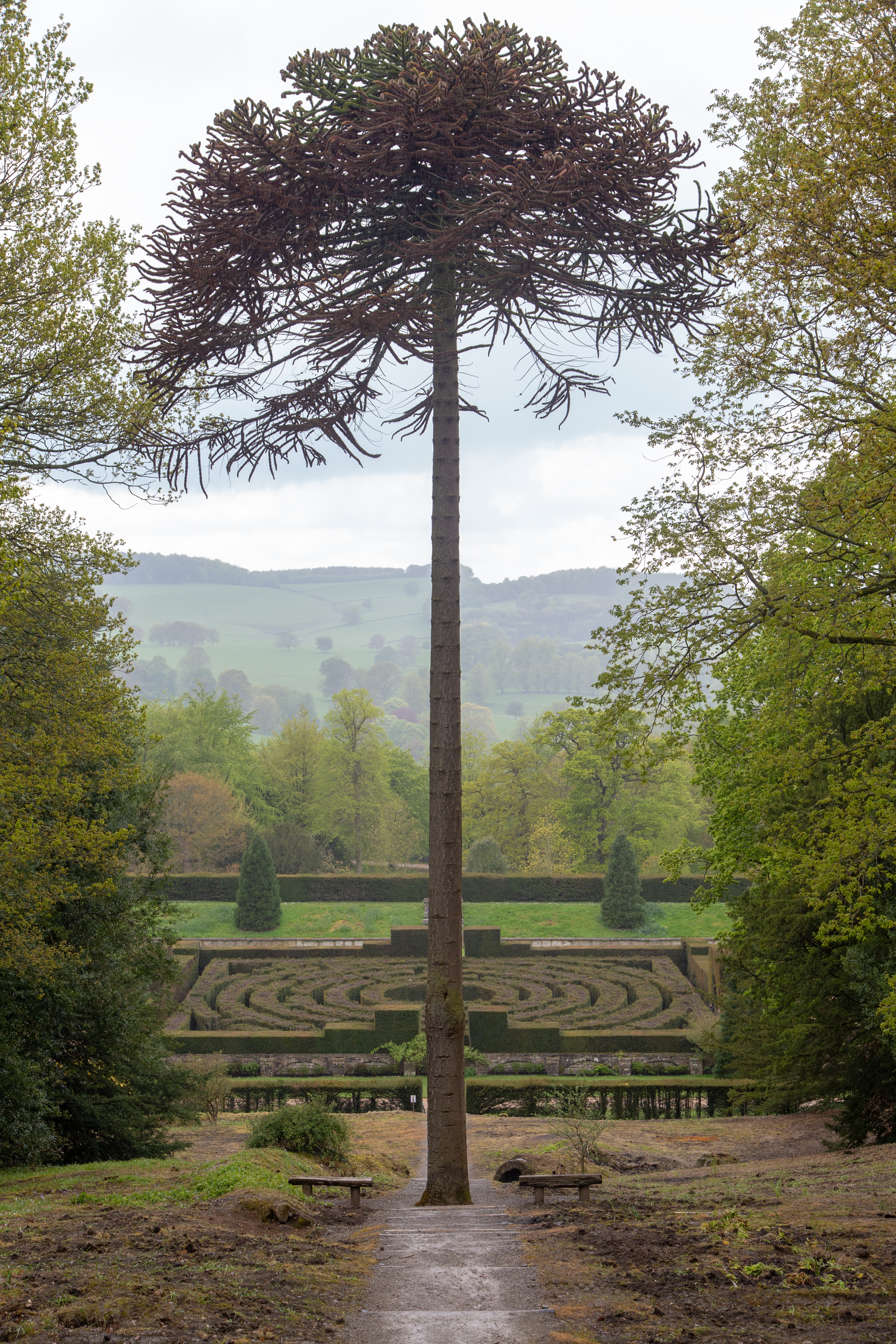
Chatworth Maze, UK

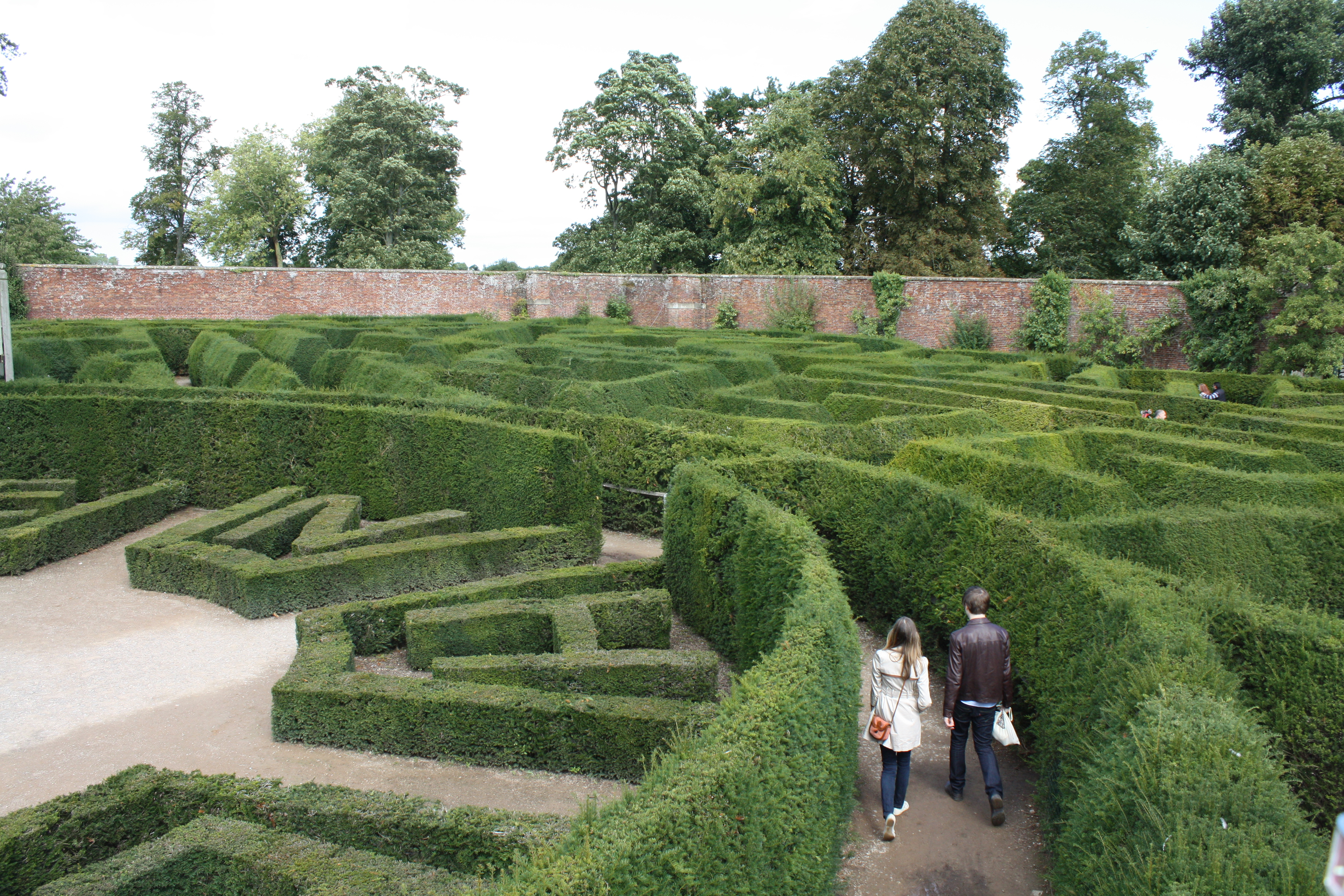
Blenheim Palace, UK

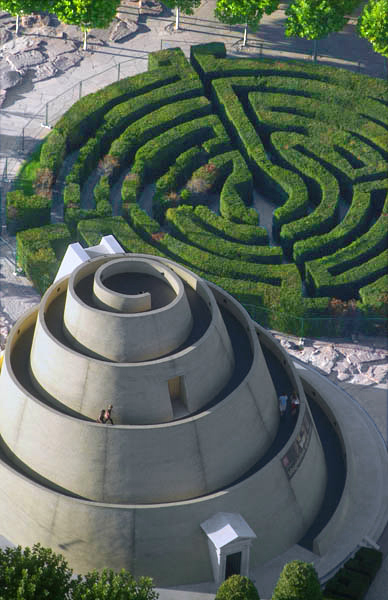
Hungarian National Theater

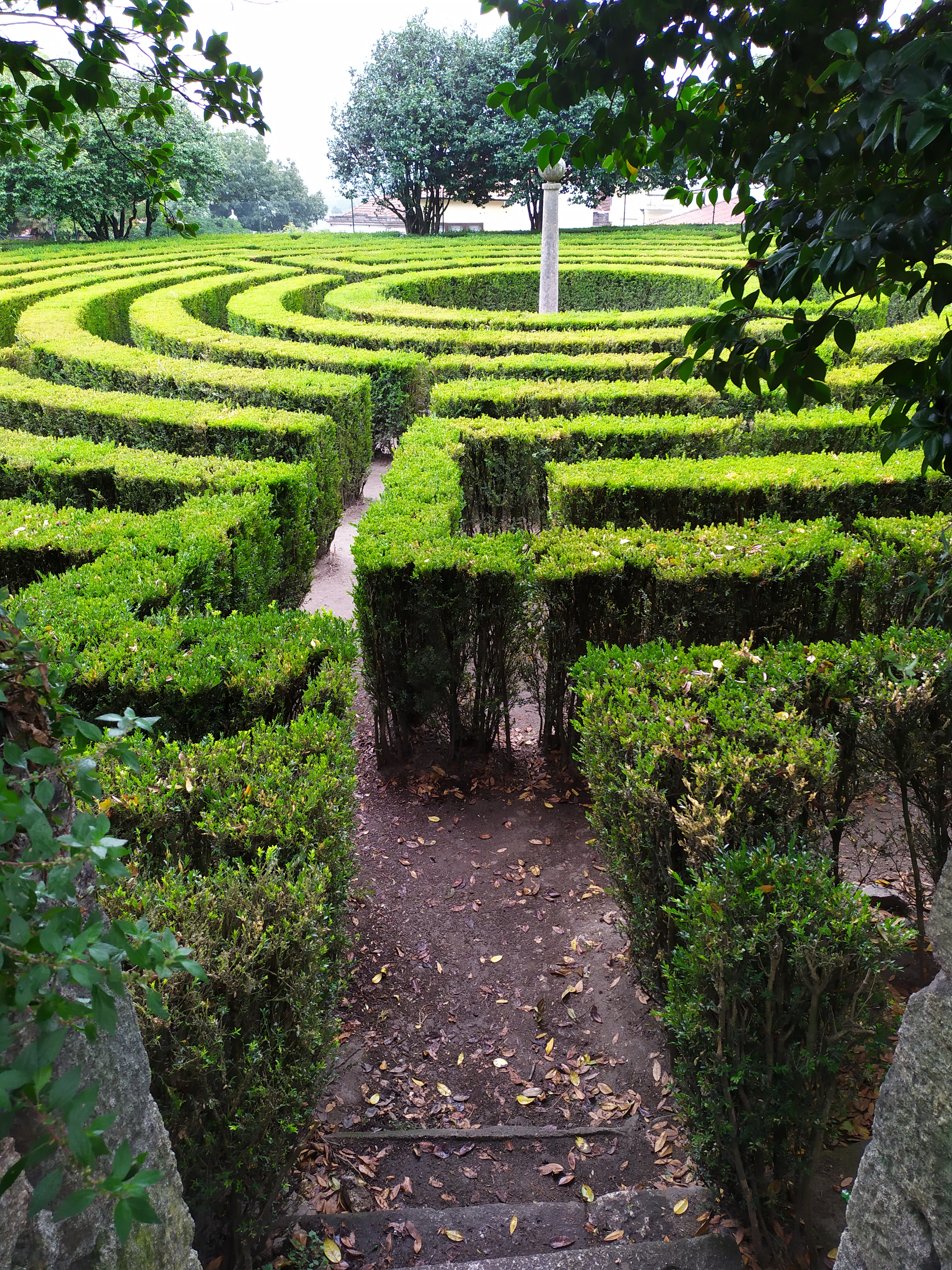
Parque São Roque da Lameira, Portugal

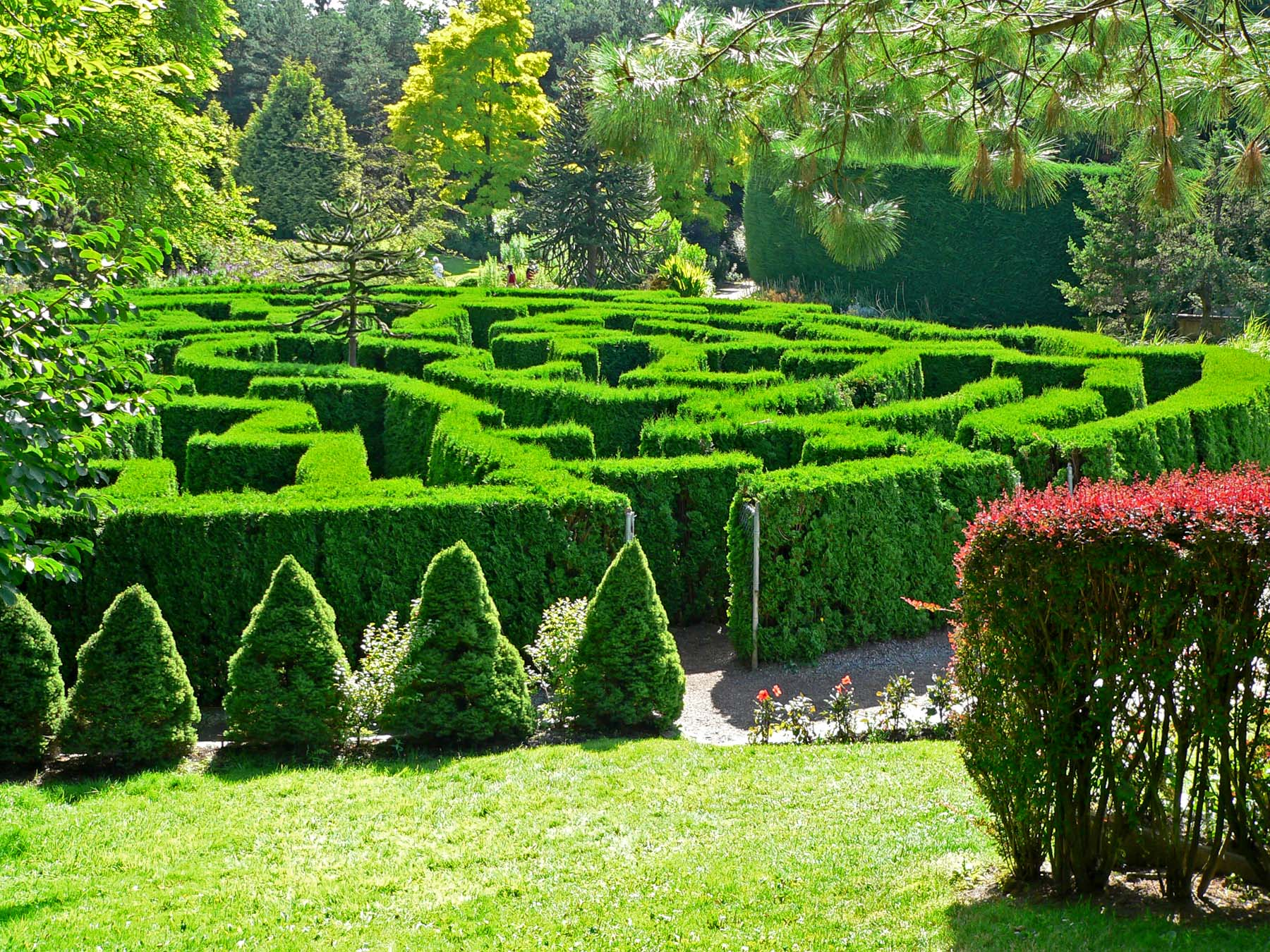
VanDusen Botanical Garden, Canada

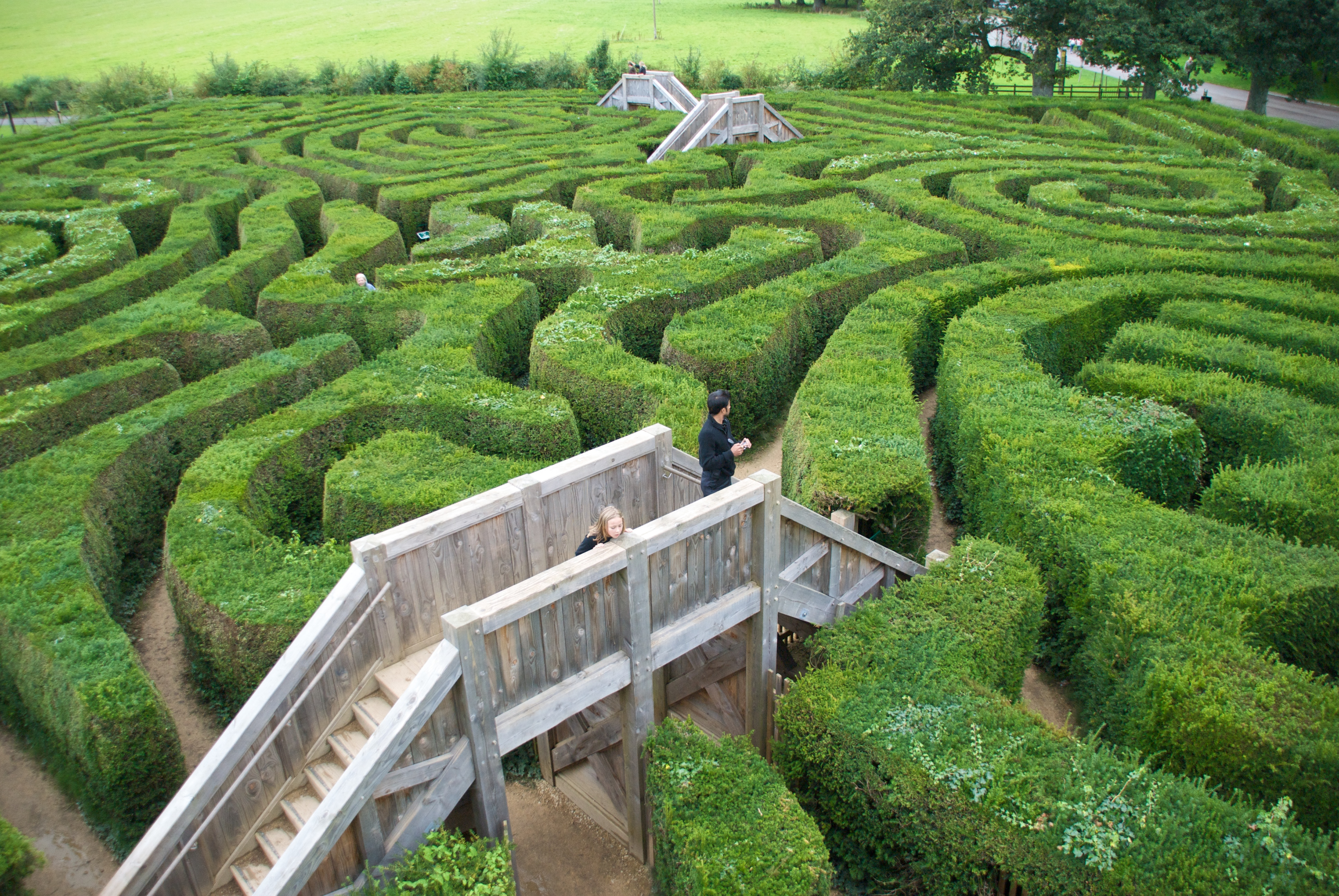
Longleat Maze is three-dimensional, UK

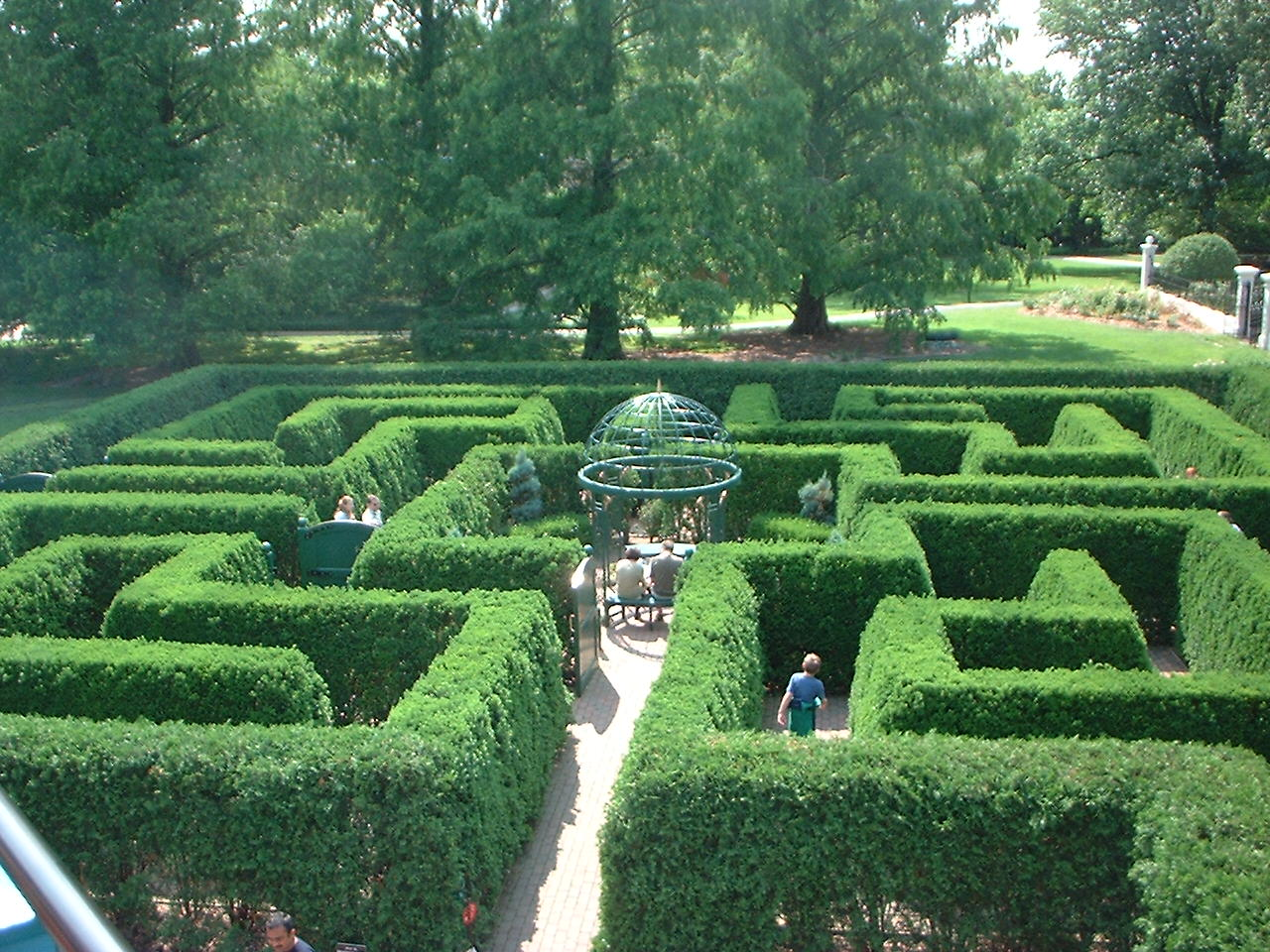
St Louis Botanical Gardens, USA

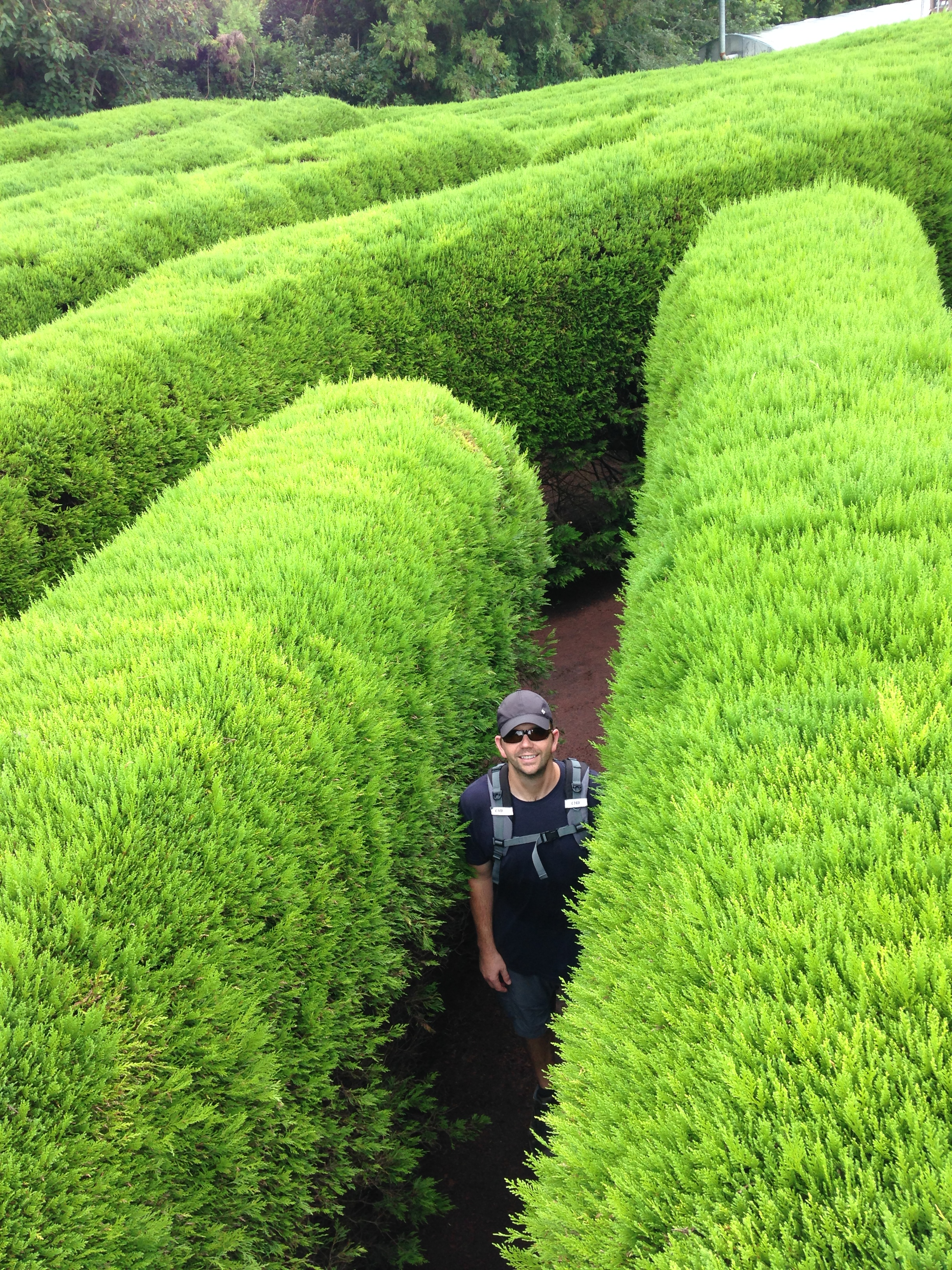
A maze in Jeju City, Korea

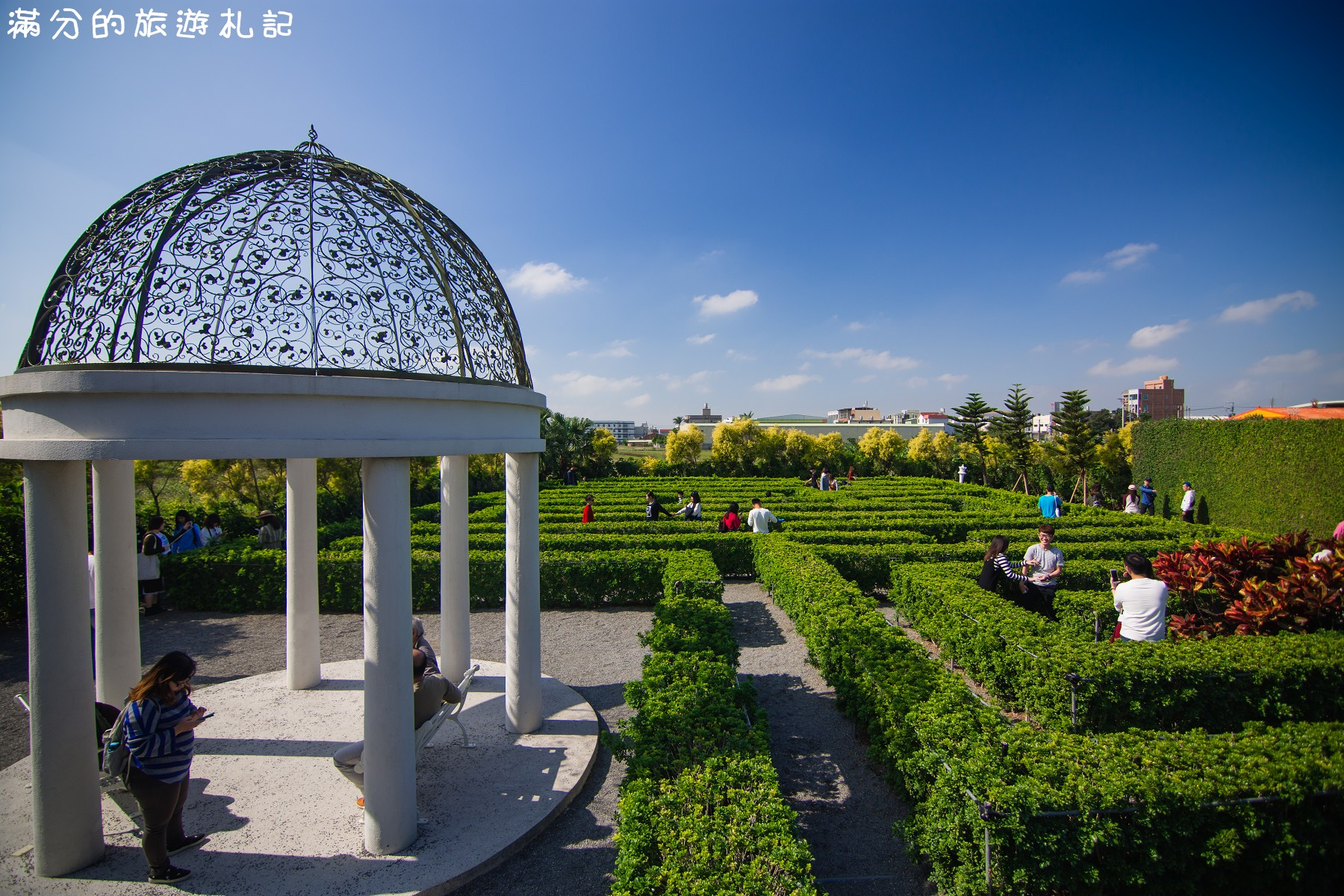
A waist-high maze in a European-style "manor" in Taiwan

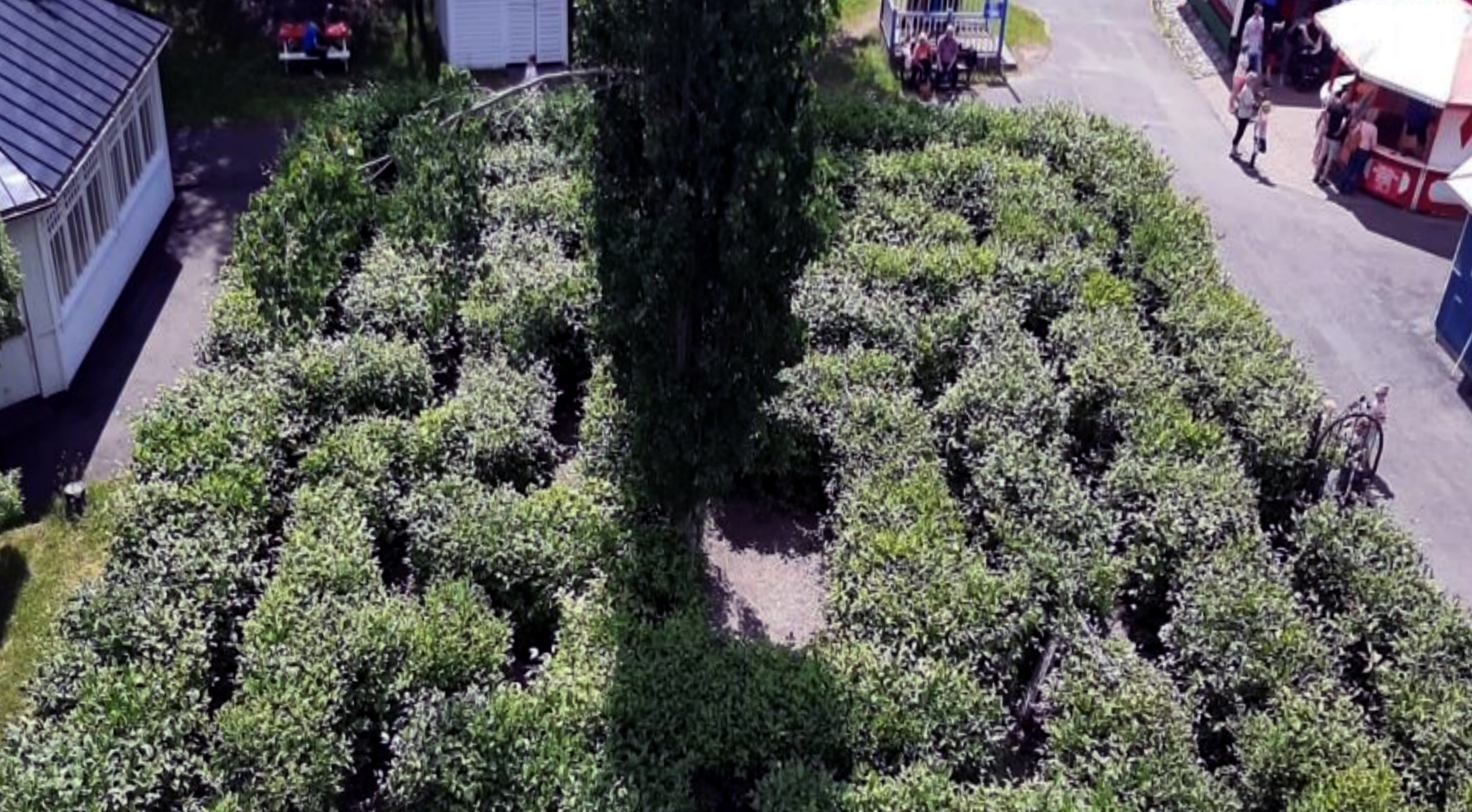
A maza at the Nokkakivi Amusement Park in Laukaa, Finland
- Blackpool Pleasure Beach, England, has a maze, though only part is constructed from hedges.
- Blackgang Chine, Isle of Wight, England.
- Blenheim Palace, England
- Castlewellan Peace Maze, Castlewellan Forest Park, Northern Ireland.
- Chatsworth House, England
- Disneyland Paris has a hedgemaze in Alice's Curious Labyrinth, an Alice in Wonderland themed area.
- Obludiste, Czech Republic
- Egeskov Castle, Denmark
- The Garden Maze at Luray Caverns, Luray, Virginia, US
- The Governor's Palace Maze in Colonial Williamsburg, Williamsburg, Virginia, US
- Hampton Court Maze, England
- Kaeser Memorial Maze, Missouri Botanical Garden, St. Louis, Missouri, US
- Laberint d'Horta, Barcelona, Catalonia, Spain
- Leeds Castle, England
- Longleat, England
- Bridge End Gardens, Saffron Walden, Essex, England
- Schönbrunn Palace, Austria
- Traquair House, Peeblesshire, Scotland
- Villa Vizcaya, Miami, Florida, US
- Botanical World Adventures hedgemaze, Hakalau, Hawaii, US
- Laberinto de Villapresente, Villapresente, Cantabria, Spain

== In fiction ==
Hedge mazes are often used as settings or plot points in fictional works. Some notable examples include:

=== Literature ===
- Where's Wally?/Where's Waldo? series by Martin Hanford – numerous volumes in the series have a hedge maze or some variant.
- Harry Potter and the Goblet of Fire by J. K. Rowling
- The Maze Runner by James Dashner – the maze is made of cinderblocks and stone, but laid out like a traditional hedge maze.

Some of the above novels have been adapted to film and television, and may include the hedge maze scenes.

Lewis Carroll's Alice's Adventures in Wonderland/Through the Looking-Glass duology does not have such a scene, but a hedge maze is included in some film and television adaptations.

=== Film ===
- The Maze
- The Shining (1980)

=== Television ===
- Scooby-Doo – numerous entries in the franchise (and its tie-in materials in other media) over its long history.

=== Video games ===
- Tomb Raider II (1997)
- MediEvil (1998)
- Alan Wake (2010)
- Hogwarts Legacy (2023)

== See also ==
- Corn maze
- Straw maze
- Turf maze
