= Straw maze =

Maze built with straw bales

A straw maze is a maze built with straw bales. These are becoming a popular tourist attraction in the Western United States, particularly in Rexburg, Idaho and a few locations in Utah. The average straw maze is built on approximately 1 acre (4,000 m^{2}) of land and takes the average person 45 minutes to navigate. The Burley straw maze is created using 1500 bales of straw.

One early straw maze was Pumpkins and More in Maryland.

There are many different straw mazes through the United States including: The Straw Maze in Idaho and Pumpkins and More in Maryland.

== See also ==
- Hedge maze
- Corn maze
