= Fajã de Cima =

- Civil parish
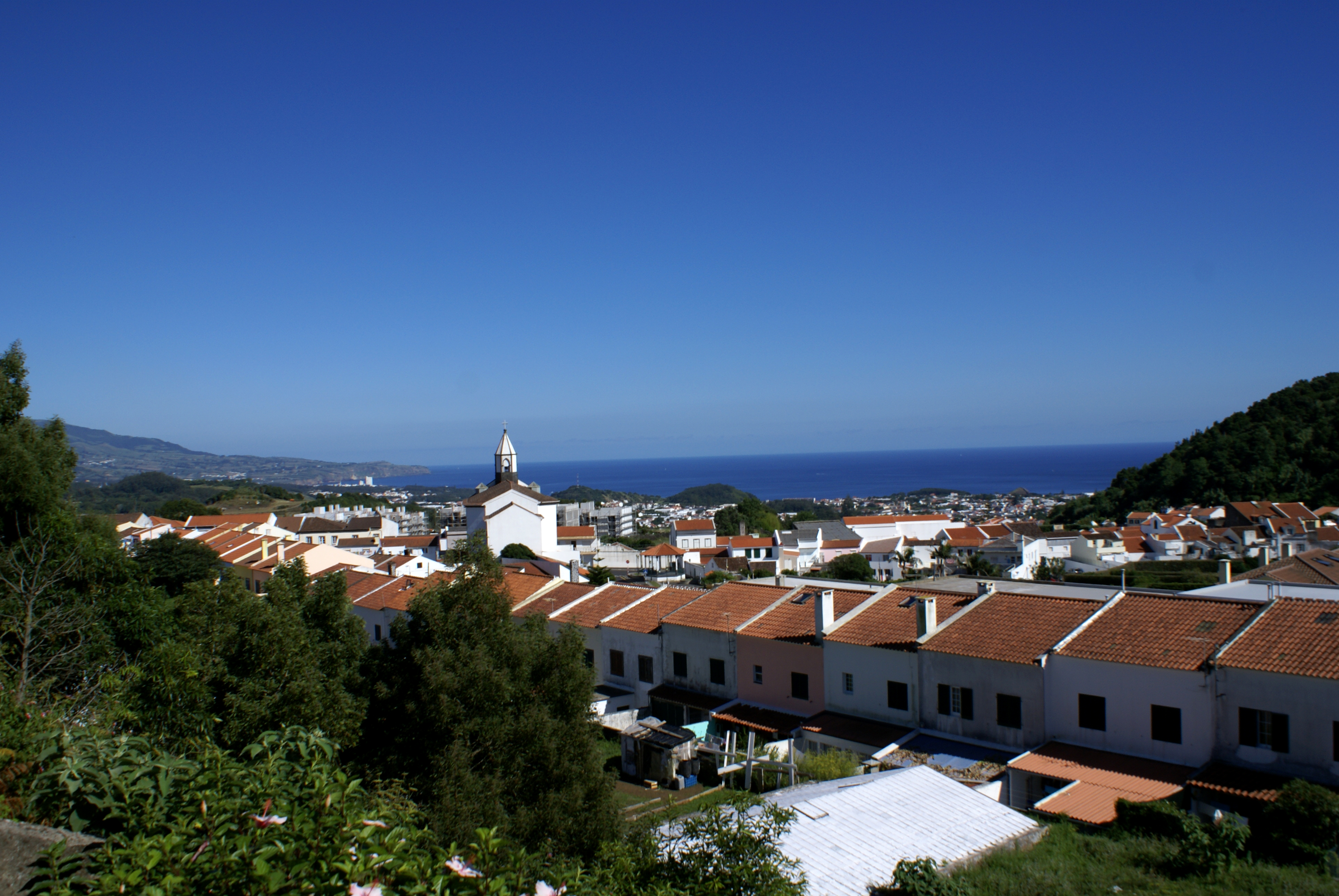
- Belvedre das Provincias, overlooking some of the newer homes of this residential community in northern Ponta Delgada

- Location of the civil parish of Fajã de Cima in the municipality of Ponta Delgada
- Coordinates: 37°46′11″N 25°39′35″W
- Country: Portugal
- Auton. region: Azores
- Island: São Miguel
- Municipality: Ponta Delgada

Area
  - Total: 11.89 km^{2} (4.59 sq mi)
- Elevation: 161 m (528 ft)

Population (2011)
  - Total: 3,438
  - Density: 289.2/km^{2} (748.9/sq mi)
- Time zone: UTC−01:00 (AZOT)
  - Summer (DST): UTC+00:00 (AZOST)
- Postal code: 9500-504
- Area code: 292
- Patron: Nossa Senhora da Oliveira

Fajã de Cima is a civil parish in the municipality of Ponta Delgada in the Portuguese archipelago of the Azores. Fajã de Cima is located in the Picos region in the western part of the island of São Miguel, north of central Ponta Delgada. The population in 2011 was 3,438, in an area of 11.89 km².

== History ==
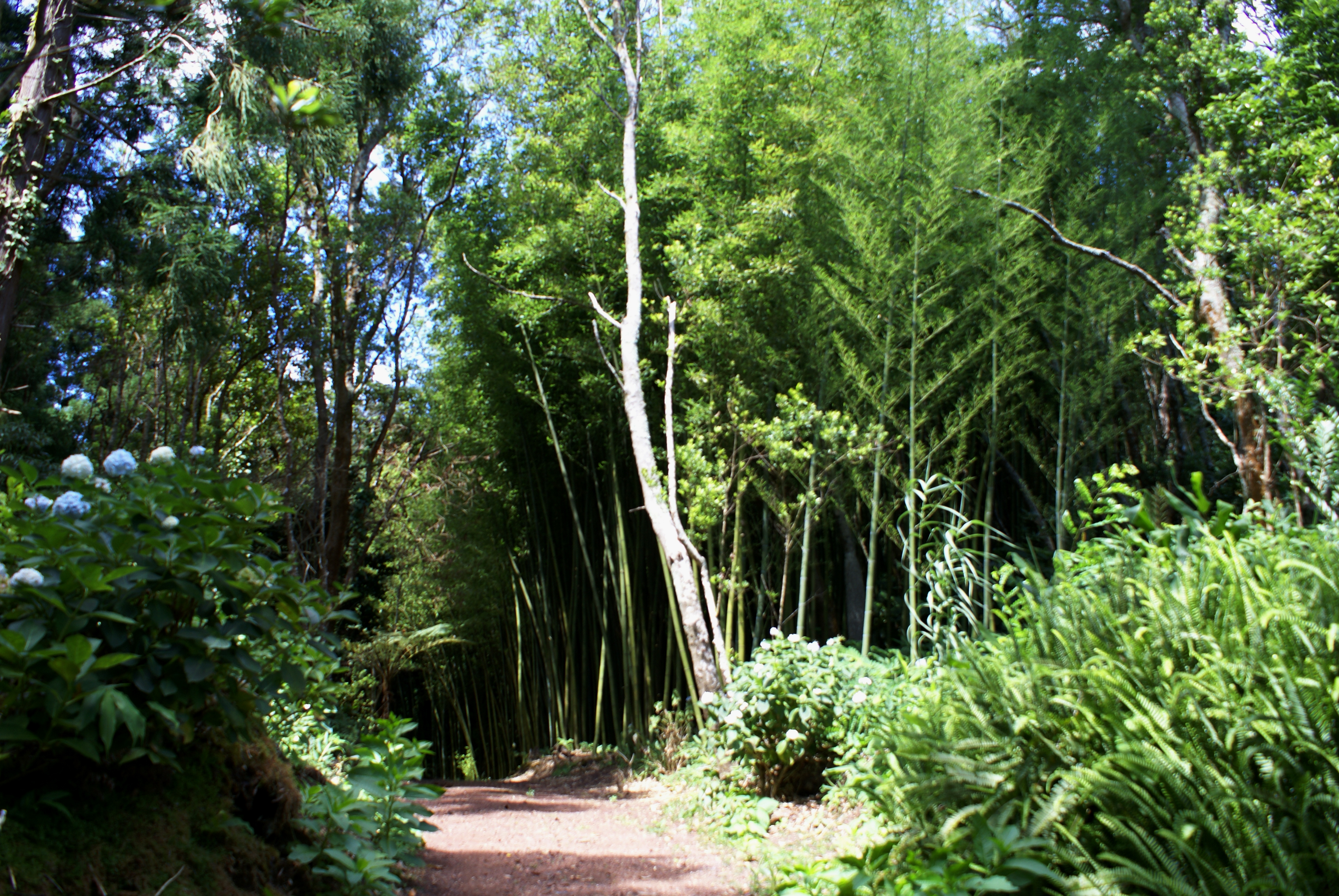
Most of the land is cultivatable, but the Forest Reserve of Pinhal da Paz, is one of the main natural parks on island

The history of Fajã de Cima is intimately related with the history of Fajã de Baixo, historically referred to as the Lugar das Fajãs (place of the Fajãs). Gaspar Frutuoso, in the 16th century, mentioned:

"To the interior, to the north, one quarter league from the city, between vineyards, is the parish of the place of Fajã, whose church is in the invocation of Our Lady of Angels."

Cândido Abranches, in 1869 referred:

"...it is written in the Book of the Tomb, of that parish...we can see that the parochial church was constructed in the site of Fajã de Cima...it was constructed in 1532. The one that today exists, was constructed in 1791, it is one nave and has six altars."

Abranches goes on to note:

"Following the road that extends to the right of the church, you'll reach Fajã de Cima...The two Fajãs are connected to the city...The upper, very populous, has a small and very ruined church to the organ of Our Lady of the Olives...This place is to the north of the city, a distance of 2 kilometre, in an elevated position..."

== Geography ==
Fajã de Cima has been a "bedroom" community of Ponta Delgada, and responsible for the largest population influx. It contains the localities Carreira and Fajã de Cima.

== Architecture ==
- Church of Nossa Senhora da Oliveira (Portuguese: Igreja de Nossa Senhora da Oliveira)
