= York Maze =

Tourist attraction in Yorkshire, England

Coordinates: 53°56′14.82″N 0°59′16.98″W

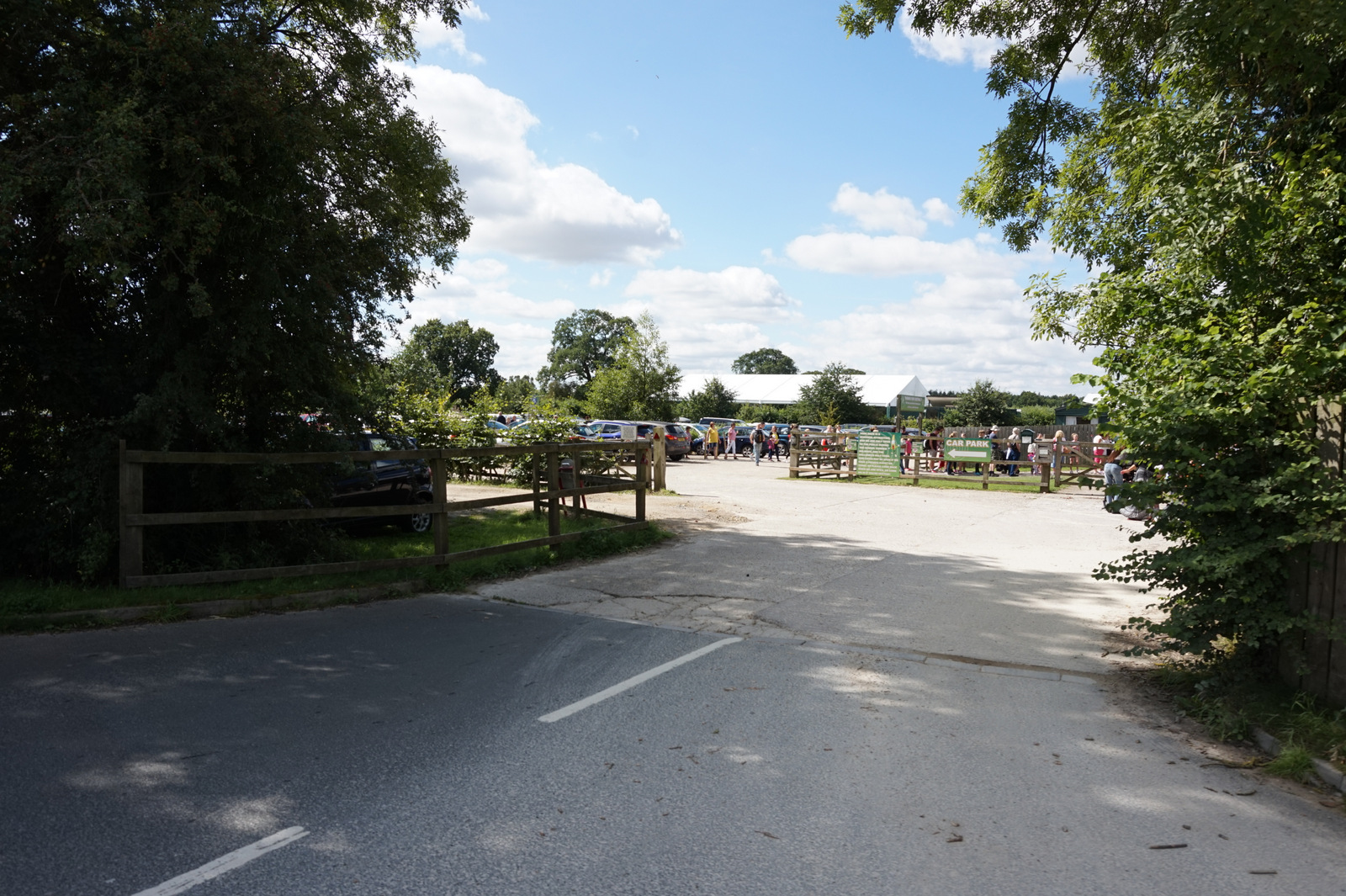
Entrance to York Maze in 2017

York Maze is a maze constructed from maize located off the B1228 road near Elvington in England.

== History ==
The maze is owned by former farmer Tom Pearce who had the idea to construct a maze after seeing an advert for a "maize maze". Pearce had been looking to diversity after his entire beef herd had to be killed due to bovine spongiform encephalopathy. Formerly located in Heslington, Pearce was required to vacate the land to make way for the third campus of the University of York. It was at this point that Pearce purchased the area of land where the maze is now sited. The maze opened at its current location in 2008.

The maze was originally designed on paper and mapped out using sticks and string. In 2006, Pearce began using GPS to create the maze which made the process easier and allowed for more complex shapes.

== Theme ==
Year	Theme	Notes
2002	Viking Longship	
2003	Spiders Web	
2004	Flying Scotsman	
2005	Big Ben	
2006	Star Trek	
2007	James Bond	
2008	Statue of Liberty	
2009	Moon Landing	For the 50th anniversary of the Apollo 11 mission
2010	Spitfire	For the 70th anniversary of the Battle of Britain
2011	Harry Potter	Contained two portraits of Daniel Radcliffe and was said to be the world's largest spot the difference
2012	Mayan	Contained an image of Yum Kaax, a Mayan god, for the end of the Mayan calendar
2013	Doctor Who	For the 50th anniversary of Doctor Who
2014	Yorkshire Legends	Portraits of Brian Blessed, Jeremy Clarkson, and Geoffrey Boycott
2015	Thunderbirds Are Go	For the 50th anniversary of Thunderbirds
2016	Roald Dahl	For the 100th anniversary of the birth of Roald Dahl
2017	Star Wars	For the 40th anniversary of Star Wars
2018	Jurassic Maze	For the 25th anniversary of Jurassic Park
2019	Lion King	For the 25th anniversary of the Lion King
2020	None	No maze
2021	Mr. Men	For the 50th anniversary of the Mr. Men books
2022	Lego	With "90 years of play" branding, thought to contain the world's largest minifigure
2023	Tutankhamun	To mark 100 years since the discovery of Tutankhamun's tomb
2024	The Gruffalo	For the 25th anniversary of The Gruffalo
2025	Toy Story	For the 30th anniversary of the first Toy Story film in 1995
