= Picture maze =

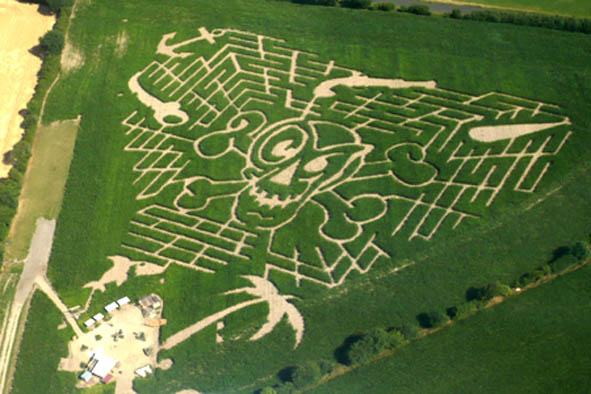
A corn maze including a skull and crossbones

A picture maze is a maze puzzle designed to resemble something visually, or one where the solution traces out a particular picture.

== History ==
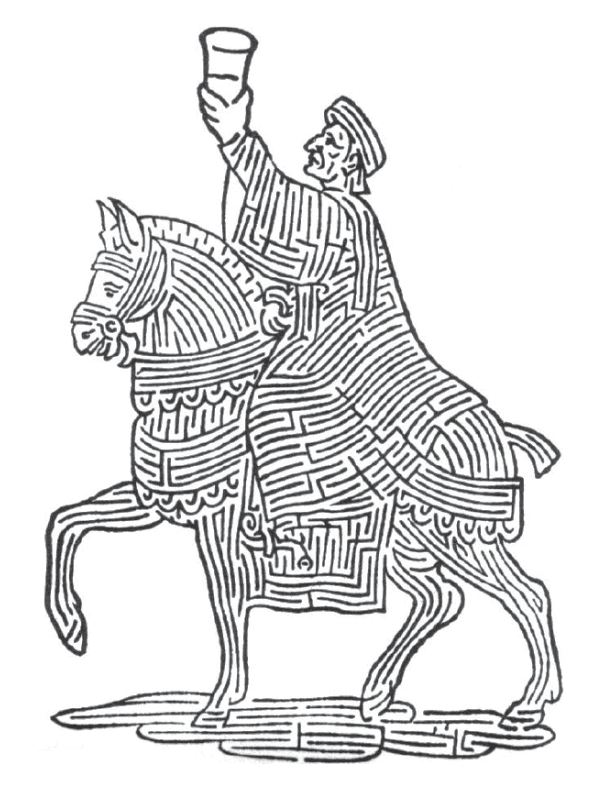
Figurative maze by Francesco Segala

Picture mazes were first pioneered by Francesco Segala, a 15th-century architect from Padua, Italy. He created puzzle maze designs, mainly in figurative forms. His designs included ships, dolphins, crabs, dogs, snails, horsemen and human figures. It is doubtful whether any of his designs were actually constructed in hedges.

In 1975, the English maze designer Randoll Coate began his life's work of creating numerous "symbolic" mazes, which combined a distinctive outer image with further internal symbols and images. His earliest works, built as hedge mazes in the landscape, included "Imprint" (a gigantic footprint) in a private garden in Oxfordshire, England in 1975; "Creation" (egg-shaped, containing a Minotaur, and - alternatively but superimposed - the Garden of Eden story) at Varmlands Saby, Varmlands, Sweden, in 1977; and "Pyramid" at the Château de Belœil, Belgium, in 1979. Randoll Coate went on to create many dozens of further symbolic mazes, 15 in conjunction with fellow Englishman Adrian Fisher.

The world's first cornfield maize maze was a picture maze, portraying a Stegosaurus (it being the year that the film Jurassic Park was premiered). This maze was created in 1993 at Lebanon Valley College, Annville, Pennsylvania, USA. It was the first of six cornfield maize mazes, each designed by Adrian Fisher, that have set Guinness World Records for progressively larger maize mazes, each one being a picture maze.

== Image puzzles ==
A picture maze (left) and its solution (right) – animation

A style of pen-and-paper picture maze popularized by Japanese publisher Nikoli, known as ukidashi meiro or PictoMazes, involves solving a maze puzzle in the regular way, drawing a path from the entrance to exit of the puzzle, avoiding the dead ends. The shape of this shortest path - particularly if emphasized by coloring in the grid squares visited - then reveals a hidden picture.

Because of two rules, it is far simpler to reverse the process to solve this puzzle. Starting at a dead end, the path is filled until it reaches an intersection with three or more paths connecting to it. This process is repeated until all dead-end paths are filled, often showing the shortest path. On larger pieces, this is the only way to solve, as there are too many possible but incorrect paths, and chance of finding the correct path based on intuition, logic or simple luck is almost nonexistent.

== Computer algorithm picture mazes ==
Using computer algorithms, picture mazes can be created at different difficulty levels by controlling the length and density of the false paths. There are picture mazes in various sizes, from small mazes of 25×25 and up to colossal poster mazes of 200×200.

== See also ==
- Maze
- Maze generation algorithm
- List of maze video games
