= Dolní Pěna =

- Municipality
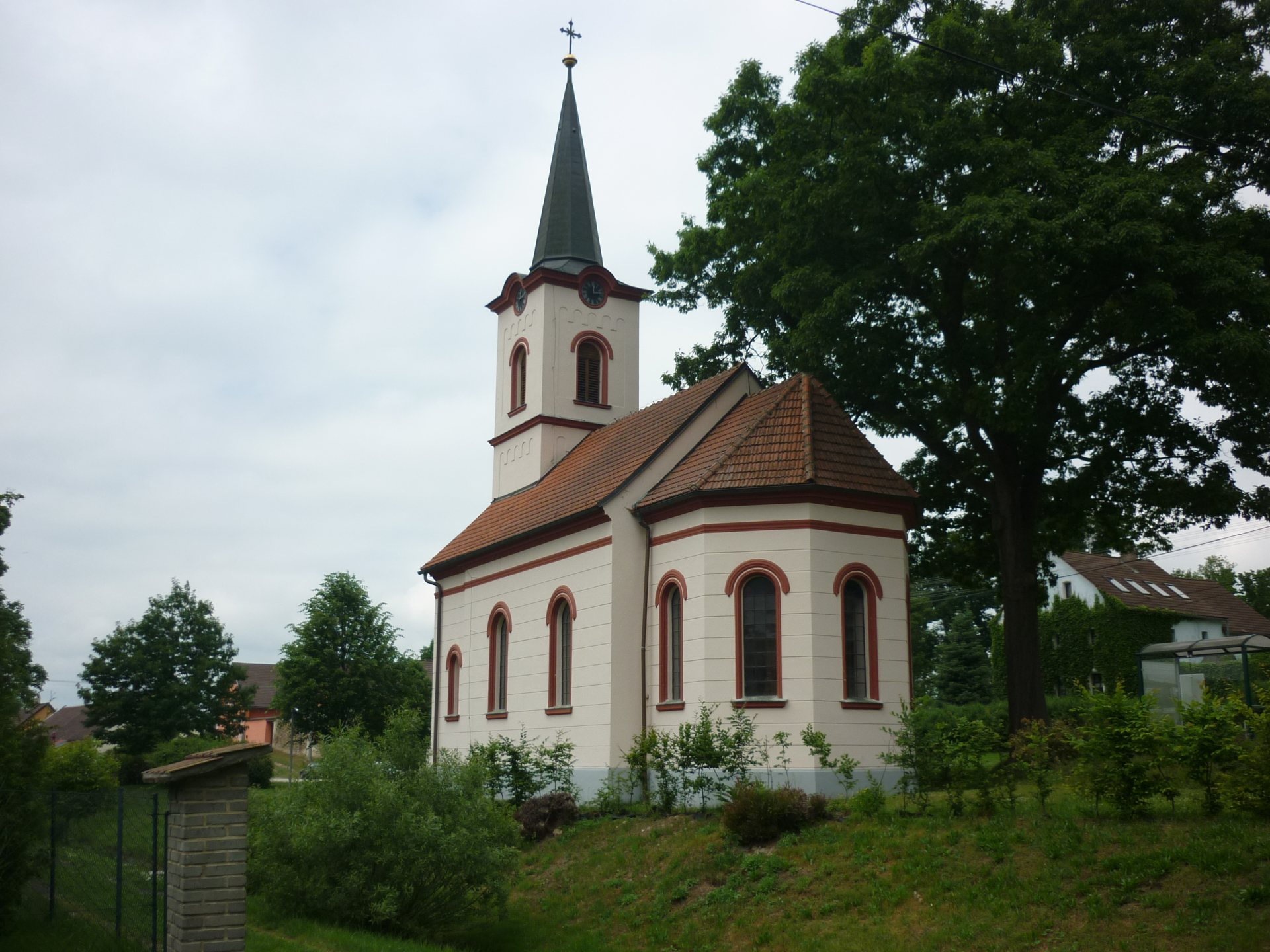
- Chapel of the Sacred Heart of the Lord

- Location in the Czech Republic
- Coordinates: 49°6′38″N 15°1′19″E
- Country: Czech Republic
- Region: South Bohemian
- District: Jindřichův Hradec
- First mentioned: 1359

Area
  - Total: 5.30 km^{2} (2.05 sq mi)
- Elevation: 473 m (1,552 ft)

Population (2026-01-01)
  - Total: 446
  - Density: 84.2/km^{2} (218/sq mi)
- Time zone: UTC+1 (CET)
  - Summer (DST): UTC+2 (CEST)
- Postal code: 377 01
- Website: www.dolnipena.cz

Dolní Pěna (German: Niederbaumgarten) is a municipality and village in Jindřichův Hradec District in the South Bohemian Region of the Czech Republic. It has about 400 inhabitants.

== Demographics ==
Historical population
Year	Pop.	±%
1869	409	—
1880	390	−4.6%
1890	334	−14.4%
1900	298	−10.8%
1910	301	+1.0%
1921	299	−0.7%
1930	279	−6.7%
1950	240	−14.0%
1961	182	−24.2%
1970	135	−25.8%
1980	98	−27.4%
1991	78	−20.4%
2001	113	+44.9%
2011	262	+131.9%
2021	406	+55.0%
Source: Censuses
