= Hampton Court Maze =

Hedge maze at Hampton Court Palace, UK

Coordinates: 51.4062°N 0.3376°W

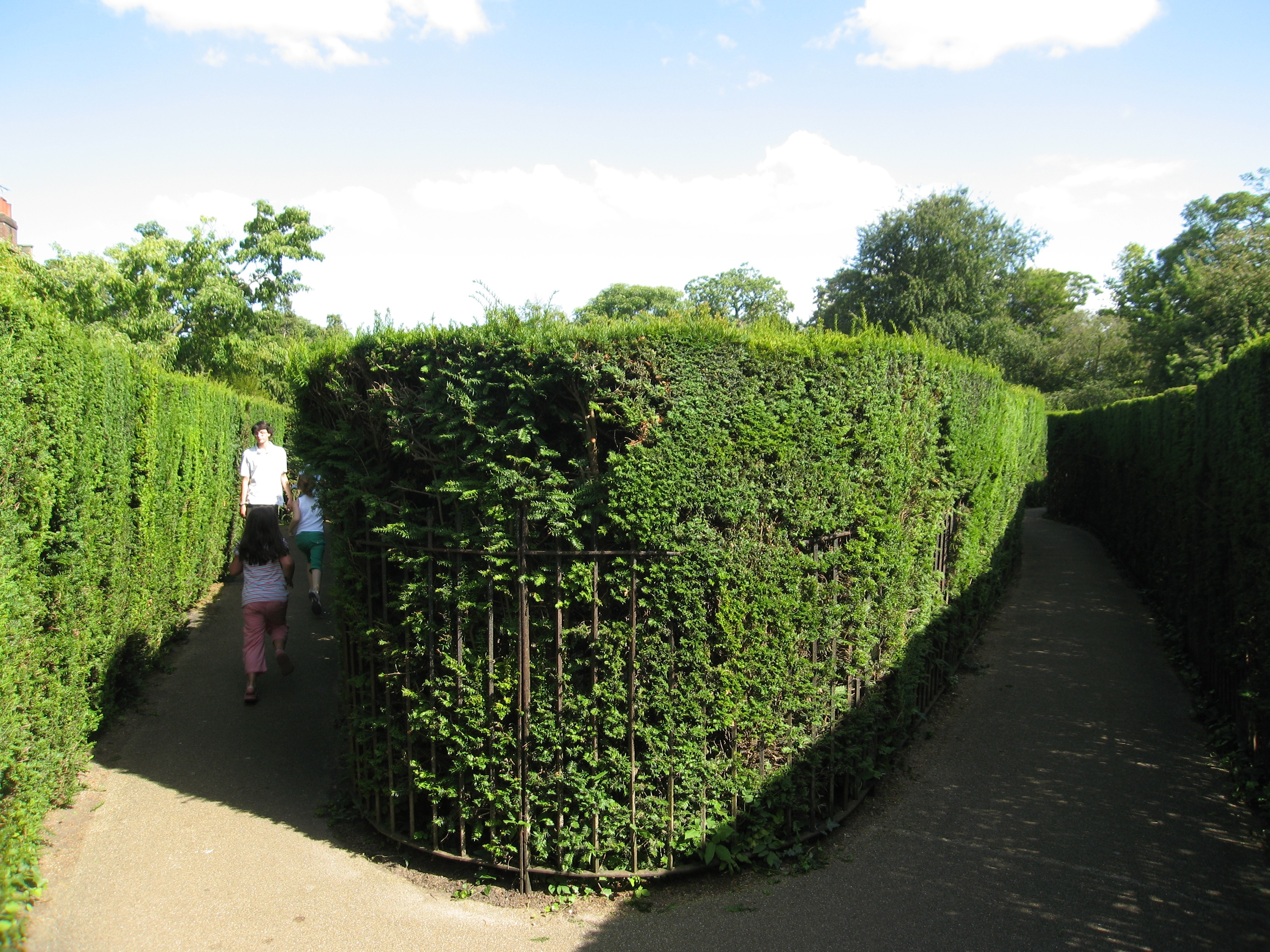
Hampton Court Maze

A diagram of the maze's layout showing a correct path to the centre

Hampton Court maze layout updated with recent openings

Hampton Court Maze is a hedge maze at Hampton Court Palace and the oldest surviving hedge maze in Britain.

Commissioned by King William III, the maze, which is about one-third of an acre, is planted in a trapezoid shape and was designed by George London and Henry Wise. It was located in the "wilderness" part of the gardens of the palace, of which it is now the only surviving part. Planted between 1689 and 1695, the maze is not particularly difficult, taking about 20 minutes for a person to make their way to the middle. It was originally planted in hornbeam, later replaced by yew.

Psychologist Edmund Sanford took inspiration from the Hampton Court Maze in his idea to create mazes for laboratory rats to study learning. The maze is referenced in some works of literature, including humorist Jerome K. Jerome's Three Men in a Boat (1889) and Carol Shields' Larry's Party (1997), and is referenced in the Only Fools and Horses episode "Three Men, a Woman and a Baby". It also serves as the inspiration for the maze at Mayer's Nest in Ian Martin's "Nightmare Nest" broadcast for the CBS Radio Mystery Theater in 1975.
