= Recreational Forest Reserve of Pinhal da Paz =

Forest reserve in São Miguel, the Azores

Forest Reserve of Pinhal da Paz
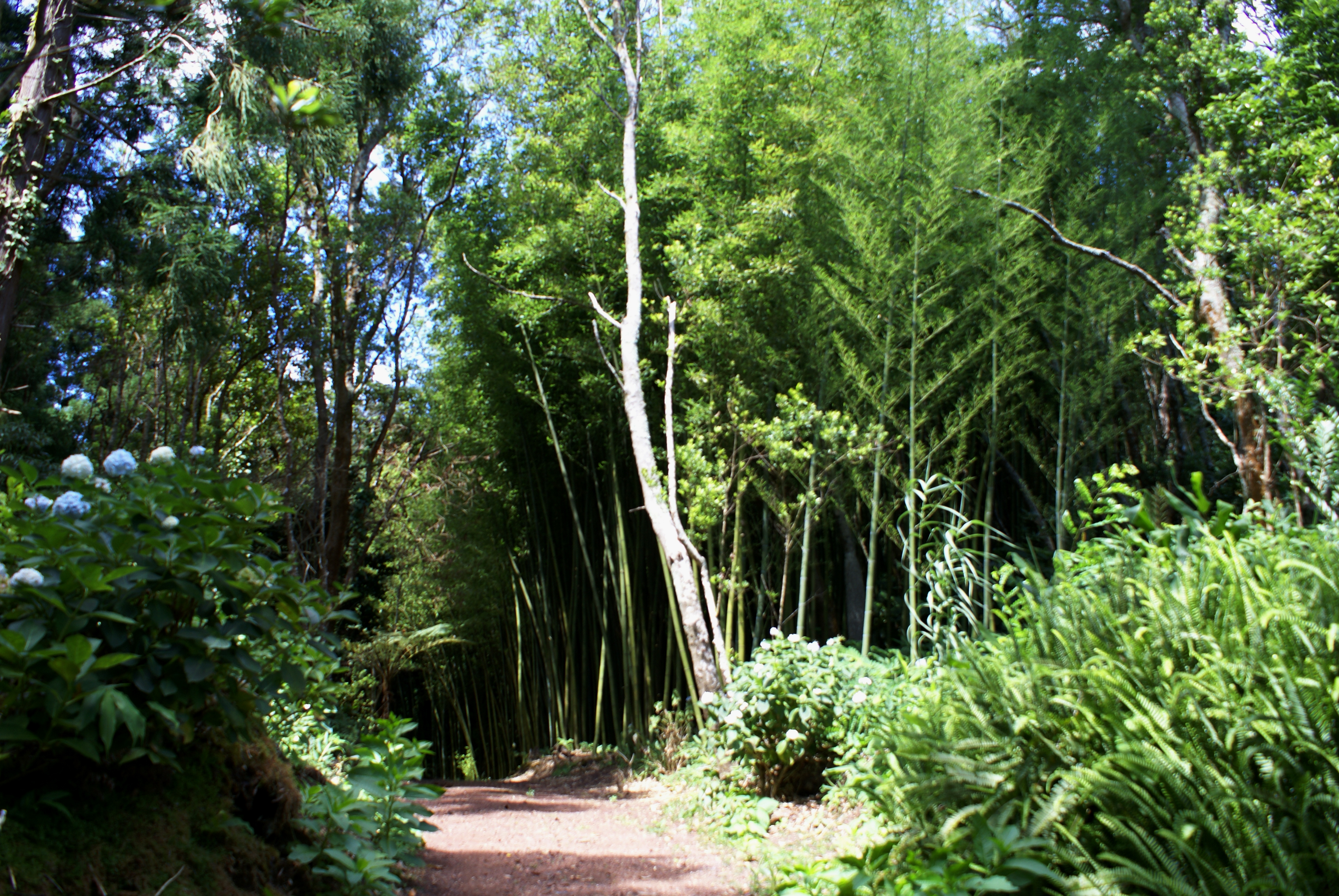
- Some of the natural vegetation that crowds the trails of Pinhal da Paz
- Interactive map of Forest Reserve of Pinhal da Paz
- Location: Ponta Delgada, São Miguel, Eastern group, Azores, Portugal
- Coordinates: 37°47′10.41″N 25°38′23.61″W
- Area: .49 km^{2} (0.19 sq mi)
- Elevation: 255 m (837 ft)
- Established: Regional Decree 15/2000/A
- Named for: Pinhal da Paz, Portuguese for pinery of peace, or literally pine of peace
- Operator: Direcção Regional dos Recursos Florestais
- Geographic detail from CAOP (2010) produced by Instituto Geográfico Português (IGP)

The Forest Reserve of Pinhal da Paz (Portuguese: Reserva Florestal de Pinhal da Paz), abbreviated to Pinhal da Paz by the locals, is a forest reserve and recreational park of .49 square kilometres (0.19 mi^{2}), in the center of the Picos Region of the island of São Miguel in the Portuguese archipelago of the Azores.

== History ==
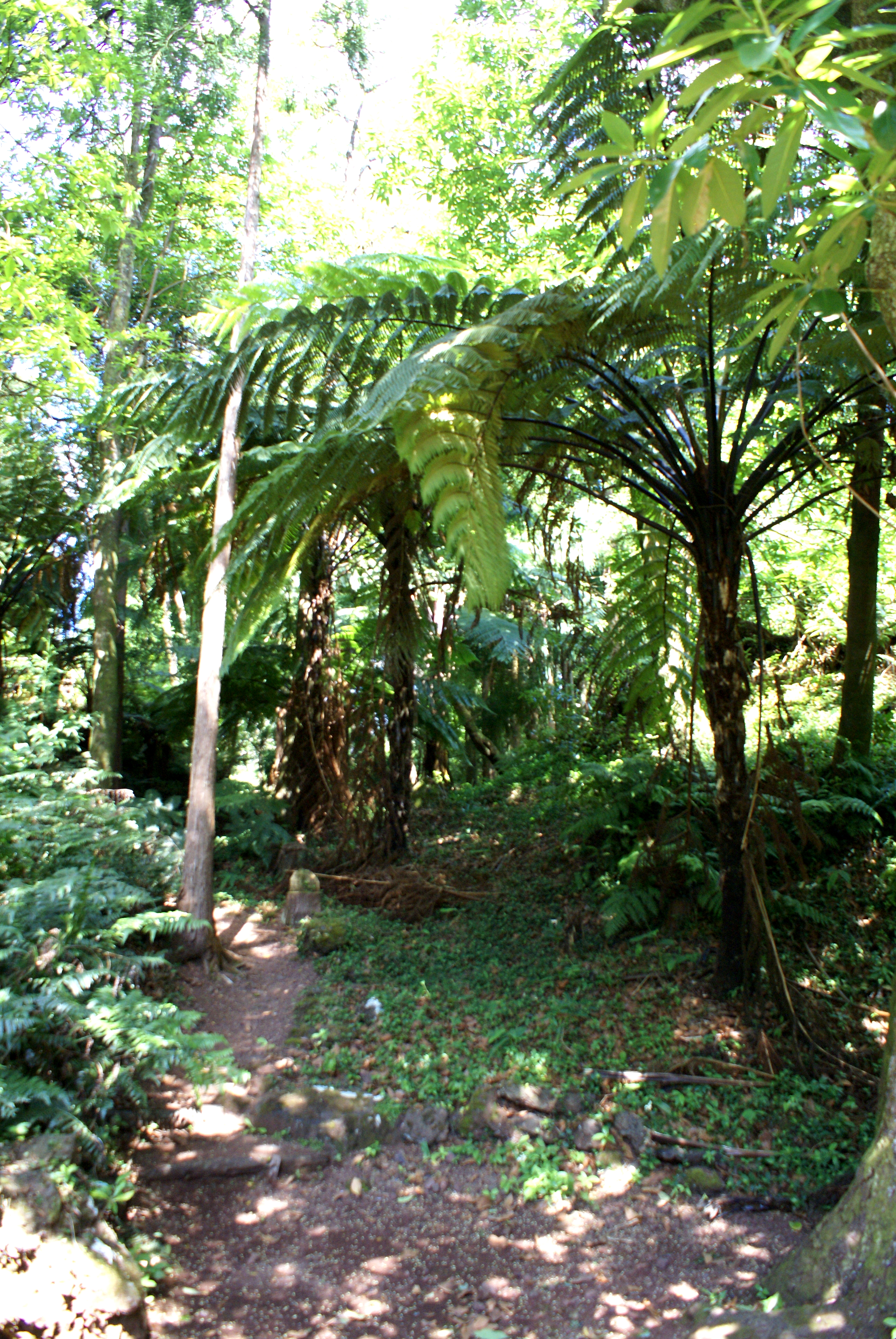
An example of the large ferns that populated the deeper part of the park

Historically referred to as the Mata das Criações (forest of the creatures), it was originally inherited by António do Canto Brum, a grandson of the prominent intellectual landowner José do Canto. The parcel occupied 49 hectares of volcanic rocky outcroppings and eroded pyroclasts, with species of pine, Myrica faya and Heather (Erica) scattered throughout the property. In this wild brush, the property owner patiently cultivated and planted wild pines, Cryptomeria, ornamental and exotic plants (such as Hydrangeas and Azaleas), large ferns and Eucalyptus. António do Canto Brum began to open roads into the area, constructed houses, captured rainwater, and created orchards and pastureland.

The new park soon attracted many local residents and gained fame in tourist circles, becoming an obligatory stop on pedestrian trails. António do Canto Brum eventually changed the name to Pinhal da Paz.

By the 1970s, the descendants of Canto had tried to maintain the park's character, but the costs of such an endeavour were overwhelming. It slowly returned to wild brush.

On 1 July 1982, the regional authority instigated the Reserva de Recreio do Pinhal da Paz, to create and implement measures to conserve the park and preserve the character of its 15 kilometres (9.3 mi) greenspaces. The Reserve was to be run by a commission, which was never nominated, and the park administration lapsed, resulting in a continued degradation of its spaces.

After several starts-and-stops, on 19 September 1988 the Regional Government acquired Pinhal da Paz from the family of António do Canto. Measures to improve the park only began in the VII Regional Government, when it was placed under the umbrella of the Secretaria Regional de Agricultura, Pescas e Ambiente, and administration of the Direcção Regional dos Rescursos Florestais, where it was renamed Reserva Florestal de Recreio Pinhal da Paz (under decree 15/2000/A, 21 June 2000). It was only in 1998 that public works were initiated to recuperate the property, now considerably degenerated, under the new authority of the Direcção Regional. This project, in addition to clearing and transforming the public nature of the park, also introduced new species of endemic species and infrastructures to support visits to the park.

== Geography ==
The park is located in the central Picos Region of the island of São Miguel, along the border between the parishes of Fajã de Cima and Pico da Pedra.

Th reserve occupies 49 hectares aligned along its northern border with the lands of the descendants of Hermano Moniz Feijó (João Manuel Clemente Almeida and Armando Soares Cordeiro), south by the lands held by the descendants of Maria Beatriz Noronha da Costa and Rodolfo Pires de Gouveia, east by the Canada do Valagão and the property owned by the descendants of Maria Cecília Câmara Marques Moreira Dhar and to the west by the Caminho das Criações.

== Infrastructures ==
From the entrance, accessible from the main gate, the park extends to the northeast and encompasses several differentiated spaces. Parking is located on the dirt plain adjacent to the main gate. At the same time, access roads and pedestrian trails extend further into the bush: the space was designed to accommodate passenger vehicles and buses.

The forest ranger's residence and dependencies are located along the restricted roadway to the main spaces, and houses the forest ranger and his family throughout the year. The rest of the park follows the identifiable pedestrian paths (signposted by various trail markers) to different sections, which include: picnic/barbecue areas, individual public washrooms (for both sexes), animal paddocks (for ducks and deer), a children's playground, a hedge-maze and an open field for other diversions, in addition to a maintenance yard for forest services. In addition, there is a small, simple hermitage near the ranger's residence dedicated to Senhora da Paz (Lady of Peace).

To complement the grounds, the Forest Service also constructed small miniature buildings (replicas of many real-life buildings) specifically for small children.

Many pedestrian trails wind throughout the park, which extend uphill to the two peaks in the park, covering 1,700 metres (1,900 yd) of trails that also includes six individual exercise stations.
