= Water maze =

Water maze may refer to:

== Neuroscience ==
- Water maze (neuroscience), an instrument for testing memory in animals
  - Cincinnati Water Maze
  - Morris water maze
