= Cincinnati Water Maze =

Water maze used in rodent experiments

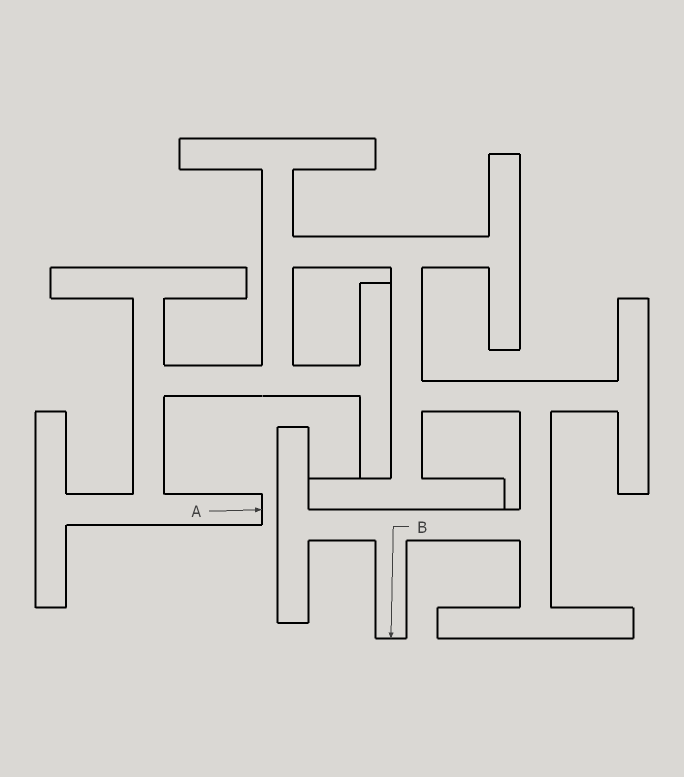
A simple schematic of a Cincinnati Water Maze. The subject can either go from A to B, or from B to A.

The Cincinnati Water Maze (CWM) is a type of water maze. Water mazes are experimental equipment used in laboratories; they are mazes that are partially filled with water, and rodents are put in them to be observed and timed as they make their way through the maze. Generally two sets of rodents are put through the maze, one that has been treated, and another that has not, and the results are compared. The experimenter uses this type of maze to learn about the subject's cognitive or emotional processes.

== Overview ==
The Cincinnati Water Maze is a water maze that has nine interconnected T-intersections. The rats are forced to find their way from one end of the maze to the other by navigating through openings in the side of the walls rather than at the end of each passage. The walls are wide enough so that the rat cannot prop itself up on the wall, and the walls are made out of Plexiglas, to prevent the subjects from carrying out any unwanted behavior such as climbing over the wall, or finding seams in the walls to grab onto. These mazes are filled with water because rats are typically natural swimmers, but rats prefer not to be in the water, so it provides motivation for all the subjects to want to complete the maze.

This test can also be run in the dark if the researcher wants to have a greater focus on the subject's egocentric navigational abilities because if the rat cannot reference visual cues in the distance, it can not use the other type of reference based navigation, allocentric navigation. There are two parts of egocentric navigation that are evaluated, route-based navigation, a clearly defined path through an environment. The other part is path integrated navigation, the ability to take a different and more direct path to a starting location than the outbound path. Egocentric navigation is evaluated by observing the subjects and recording how many times the subject crosses a predetermined line at each T-intersection with their head and forepaws, indicating they are going in the wrong direction, or in other words, they are lost.

== History ==
The predecessor to the Cincinnati Water Maze (CWM), the Biel Water Maze (BWM), was invented in 1940 by W. C. Biel to test rats’ egocentric navigational capabilities. As such, the BWM was enclosed within a container to prevent any external stimuli, such as light, from assisting the subject in completing the task. This ensures that the rat's memory from previous trials is the primary source of information. Moreover, the original design of the BWM had walls measuring just over a fifth of a meter in height, leaving approximately 20 cm of clearance between the top of the maze and the ceiling of the container. The design of the BWM was made so that each intersection formed a T-intersection.

Nevertheless, there were several concerns with the BWM, including the abundance of T-Intersections, which prompted the innovation that would result in the creation of the CWM. In contrast to the BWM, the CWM possesses wider channels to prevent larger rats from propping themselves up, and has the added benefit of asymmetry and extra intersections. Furthermore, the strategy that was predominantly seen in the BWM, where rats would swim in a straight line until forced to turn, was undone by the inherent asymmetry of the CWM. Instead, if the rats began at point-A, to arrive at point-B they would have to turn halfway down a corridor prior to reaching a dead end. Conversely, beginning at point-B towards point-A allows for the standard method previously mentioned.

== Uses ==
AN EEG recording of a rat inside a general water maze

The Cincinnati Water Maze was developed by Dr. Charles V. Vorhees. Many improvements were developed in collaboration with Dr. Michael T. Williams. The CWM is most often used to measure escape latency, which is the time required for the subject to escape the maze. Researchers may also measure the number of errors the subject makes, which are counted when the subject moves into the stem or arms of a dead-end cul-de-sac. The animal will typically be put in the same maze for 2 trials per day for 5 days if tested in the light and 18 or more days if tested in the dark, the goal being to assess the rat's procedural learning. The subject must learn the route as there is only one way out. Rats are given a 5-minute time limit if they cannot find the escape to prevent fatigue. By studying the escape latency and errors of the animal, researchers have a standardized test for the rate of learning in a subject. CWMs are especially useful because they are a direct test of egocentric learning/navigation. Without external visual cues, the rat is forced to remember the sequence of turns from previous trials to escape. This is useful for determining the effect of drugs on short-term memory egocentric learning. The test is also useful in mapping areas of the brain where spatial learning occurs by recording areas of brain activity during the test. In one variation, adding light, or other visual cues, researchers may measure allocentric learning/memory. With this procedure, the test becomes similar to the Morris Water Maze, where spatial learning is tested. Furthermore, in this variation, the rat is able to use both allocentric and egocentric cues to escape. This is particularly useful for studying spatial memory, as the rats are able to use both types of navigational cues. The CWM is not useful for mice. Mice do not have the cognitive ability to find the escape from such a complex maze. Further, the CWM must be preceded by a day of training in which they must learn to swim a simple straight water-filled channel from one end to the other for 4 trials. This allows one to measure swim speed to see that all groups are equal before entering the maze and to teach the rats that the submerged platform at the end is the escape. Without this prior training, there are high failure rates when rats were put into the CWM. Even with this training, when run under infrared light in the dark, it takes control rats 5–7 days to just begin to learn how to escape and 18–24 days to show mastery.

== Analysis ==
=== Weaknesses ===
Since water mazes have been used mostly with rats and mice, the extrapolation of research data from these experiments to other organisms and humans is limited. The Cincinnati Water Maze (CWM) poses some limitations to experimenters as with all rodent tests, one must extrapolate to human egocentric/procedural learning and memory where different tests are used. For example, the element of water escape is different from using food restriction together with food or sweetened liquid as used in appetitive mazes. An advantage of water mazes is that they require less training than appetitive mazes, and if rats have pre-existing activity differences (if they are hyperactive or hypoactive in an open-field) those differences do not affect swimming and therefore do not influence maze performance. The CWM only measures route-based egocentric navigation when run in the dark, it does not measure the other component of egocentric navigation, that is, path integration, where a rat can learn a direct or short-cut path from the start to the goal as animals can do in some unstructured mazes. Another advantage of water mazes is that they are insensitive to body weight differences. Therefore, if an experimental treatment reduces the growth and body weight of one group compared with controls, it has little or no effect on water maze learning. Research has shown that the CWM has a steep learning curve compared to the Morris Water Maze; making the data collected on early trials less useful.

=== Comparison to other mazes ===
T-maze

- Original T-mazes are very simple grounded mazes (dry) that present the rat with two options to choose from.
- Allows the experimenter to make deductions of the cognitive decision-making abilities of the rats as well as look for patterns in the influence one decision will have on the other.
- Multiple T-mazes help extrapolate the findings associated with right and wrong decision making, as many two choice decisions must be made consecutively to complete this kind of maze.

Y-maze

- Very similar to the T-maze, the original Y-maze is a grounded maze with a simple two choice decision to be made.
- Cognitive decision-making abilities the focus of the maze, similar to T-maze.
- Y shape of maze has shown greater learning inclination, due to more gradual turns into choice options (Y shape instead of T).

Radial arm maze

- An appetitive or water maze where the rat is positioned in the center of the maze with 8, 12, or 17 radiating arms at the dead of each is a reward if run appetitive after food restriction or an escape platform if run as a swimming maze.
- Short-term memory is tested by how many times the animal goes down an arm more than once, hence, the learning is trial-dependent. Once it has entered an arm, it should not enter it again if it is to optimize getting rewards for each arm it visits. A variation of the radial-arm maze uses a mixture of some arms baited on every trial and some arms never baited. Visits to unbaited arms reflect reference memory errors whereas reentries to baited arms after the bait is taken represent working memory errors. The appetitive version can be used with rats or mice, the swimming version works only for rats.
- The rat may be timed to see how long it takes to visit all the pathways; noting repeat visits to paths.

Morris water navigation task

- The MWM is conducted in a circular pool of water that is featureless inside and has multiple distinctive cues outside. An animal is placed in water from a different start location on every trial and must find a hidden submerged platform to escape. The platform remains in the same position across trials. Latency, path length, and path efficiency (ratio of a straight line to the goal divided by the path length the animal swims) are measured using video tracking software. Animals are given multiple trials per day and this is called acquisition. At the end of acquisition, usually 24 hours later, the animal is given a probe trial to test reference memory with no platform present. Where the animal searches reflects its memory for where the platform used to be. Many experimenters then move the platform to the opposite quadrant and test cognitive flexibility in a reversal learning phase. Usually, the same number of trials and days are used for reversal as for acquisition with a reversal probe trial given 24 hours after the last reversal platform trial. Some add to this a shift phase that is similar to acquisition and reversal but with the platform moved to a new quadrant.
- Rats are natural swimmers and learn the task well, but tank and platform size are important factors in determining task difficulty. Mice do best in pools 122 to 150 cm in diameter. Rats do best in pools of 183, 200-210 or even 244 cm in diameter. In rats, the larger pool sizes make the test more sensitive to spatial learning deficits. Trial length is typically limited to 90 to 120 seconds for rats to prevent fatigue. If an animal reaches the time limit, it is either placed on the platform by the experimenter or guided there, but guidance represents experimenter interference and is generally not recommended.
- Rat has lots of free range in executing this maze. After all hidden platform trials are run, an important control procedure is to then conduct cued trials. For these curtains are closed around the pool to block line-of-sight access to distal cues and the platform is marked with a distinctive cue. For these trials both the start position of the animal around the perimeter and the location of the platform are changed on every trial to prevent the animal from using any residual distal cues, i.e., so that it cannot use spatial learning. The cued version relies on the animal used proximal rather than distal cues, and proximal cues are not hippocampus-dependent.
- Drugs may be given to the rat to examine behavior in water and effect on motivation.
- The MWM requires the rat to rely on multiple visual cues to triangulate the location of the platform no matter where it starts from on each trial. This requires the use of many allocentric cues as opposed to those used in simple T-mazes.
- From this maze, one can observe if the rat is able to identify the correct location of the other platform by examining its search pattern.

The Cincinnati Water Maze (CWM) can be summarized as a combination of the mazes that can be used with or without distal cues present. The rats are faced with a much different challenge compared with simple T or Y-mazes due to the greater complexity of this maze. When the CWM is run in the dark it is extremely challenging for rats to learn but this complexity can reveal egocentric, striatal-related and perhaps lateral entorhinal cortex abnormalities since these are the regions associated with procedural learning and memory.

Each of the mazes centered on cognitive research are measured by observing the subject's ability to maneuver through the maze whether this be measured by time, number of trials and errors. Consistency from rat to rat in their ability to solve the maze task is important and allows scientists to then look for what may cause a deviation in performance in a certain rat, or groups of rats.
