= Water maze (neuroscience) =

A water maze is a behavioral assay used in neuroscience to test spatial memory in rodents. They are particularly used to explore the role of egocentric (body-centered; compare to allocentric, world-centered) cues in spatial navigation and memory. Many types of water mazes have been developed, each with different strengths and limitations. In a typical water maze task, a mouse or rat is placed in a maze in which the alleys are filled with water, providing a motivation to escape. The pool is usually either filled with an opaque liquid, or the experiment is conducted in darkness. This allows researchers to isolate the role of egocentric cues in spatial memory, as the presence of allocentric cues (i.e., visual and tactile cues) is minimized in this experimental design.

Many different mazes exist, such as T- and Y-mazes, Cincinnati water mazes, and radial arm mazes. Water mazes have been used to test discrimination learning and spatial learning abilities. The Morris water navigation task is often called a "water maze task", but this is erroneous as it is not, properly speaking, a maze. The development of these mazes has aided research into, for example, hippocampal synaptic plasticity, NMDA receptor function, and looking into neurodegenerative diseases, such as Alzheimer's disease.
