= C4H4N2O3 =

The molecular formula C_{4}H_{4}N_{2}O_{3} (molar mass: 128.09 g/mol, exact mass: 128.0222 u) may refer to:

- Barbituric acid (or malonylurea)
- 5-Hydroxyuracil
