= Hydroxyuracil =

Hydroxyuracil may refer to:

- Barbituric acid (6-hydroxyuracil)
- 5-Hydroxyuracil, an oxidized form of cytosine
