= Barnes maze =

Maze used in psychological laboratory experiments

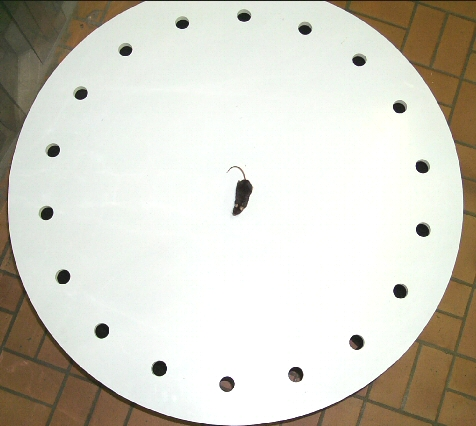
The Barnes maze

The Barnes maze is a tool used in psychological laboratory experiments to measure spatial learning and memory. The test was first developed by Dr. Carol Barnes in 1979. The test subjects are usually rodents such as mice or lab rats, which either serve as a control or may have some genetic variable or deficiency present in them which will cause them to react to the maze differently. The basic function of Barnes maze is to measure the ability of a mouse to learn and remember the location of a target zone using a configuration of distal visual cues located around the testing area. This noninvasive task is useful for evaluating novel chemical entities for their effects on cognition as well as identifying cognitive deficits in transgenic strains of rodents that model for disease such as Alzheimer's disease. It is also used by neuroscientists to determine whether there is a causative effect after mild traumatic brain injury on learning deficits (acquisition trials) and spatial memory retention (probe) at acute and chronic time points. This task is dependent on the intrinsic inclination of the subjects to escape from an aversive environment and on hippocampal-dependent spatial reference memory.

== Set-up ==
The Barnes maze consists of a circular surface with up to 20 circular holes around its circumference. Visual cues, such as colored shapes or patterns, are placed around the table in plain sight of the animal. The table surface is brightly lit by overhead lighting. Under one of the holes is an "escape box" which can be reached by the rodent through the corresponding hole on the table top. The model is based on rodents' aversion of open spaces, which motivates the test subject to seek shelter in the escape box. A normal rodent will learn to find the escape box within four to five trials and will head directly toward the escape box without attempting to escape via incorrect holes. Various parameters are measured including latency to escape, path length, number of errors, and velocity. The selection of a background strain and the choice of behavioural tasks are significant in determining the outcome of an experiment. These variables help to verify that innate anxiety and cognitive ability differ considerably among mouse strains.

== Performance ==
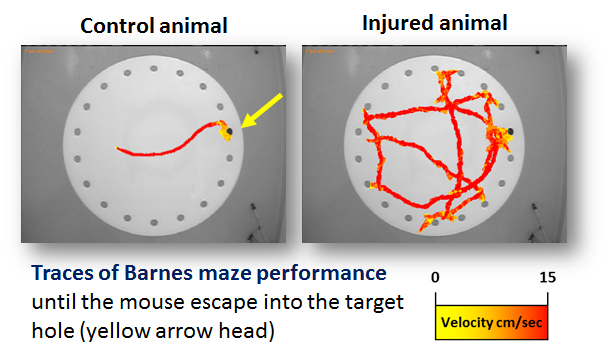
Barnes Maze Paths

Performance is typically measured by number of errors the rodent makes, i.e. the number of times it pokes its nose into a hole that does not contain the escape box. The rate of decline in the number of errors per trial can be calculated to represent a learning curve. Other performance values can also be measured, such as path length to the escape box, with a shorter path indicating fewer errors. Additionally, the strategy used by each rodent can be scored as random (randomly checking each hole), systematic (checking each hole in a pattern) or spatial (direct movement to the hole with the drop box).

Due to the spatial nature of the Barnes maze, damage to the hippocampus leads to deficits in performance of the task. An experiment done on degu, a specific rodent species, showed that there can be sex differences in performance on the Barnes maze. During the task training where encoding would occur, females used more frequently a spatial strategy, while males preferably applied either serial, random or opposite strategies. In addition, it was noted that the spatial retention ability of female rats was largely dependent on the phase of their estrus cycle. The differences between males and females are found during the encoding period but not during the storage, indicating that acquisition and consolidation are differently influenced by sex in degu.

== Comparison to other mazes ==
The Barnes maze is similar to the Morris water navigation task and to the radial arm maze task, but does not utilize a strong aversive stimulus (stress induced by swimming such as in the Morris water maze) or deprivation (food or water deprivation such as in the radial arm maze) as reinforcement. Behavioral tasks involving high levels of stress can influence the animal's performance on the task, making the Barnes maze ideal for eliminating stress-induced confounds. However, due to the lack of a strong aversive stimuli, some rodents may lack motivation to complete the task. Once acclimated to the maze, subjects may prefer to explore instead of complete the task. Using different parameters to analyze the data is important for avoiding this issue. Latency, path length to escape box, and number of errors to the first nose poke at the escape hole have been used as measures previously. Another drawback to the Barnes maze is that when testing multiple animals, scent cues left on the maze by the previous animal could alter the performance of subsequent subjects. This can be easily corrected by cleaning the maze after each trial.

== See also ==
- Morris water navigation task
- Oasis maze
