= Carol A. Barnes =

American neuroscientist

- Education: University of California, Riverside; University of Ottawa; Carleton University
- Scientific career
- Fields: Neuroscience, memory, learning
- Workplaces: University of Arizona
- Doctoral advisor: Peter Fried

Carol A. Barnes is an American neuroscientist who is a Regents' Professor of Psychology at the University of Arizona. Since 2006, she has been the Evelyn F. McKnight Chair for Learning and Memory in Aging and is director of the Evelyn F. McKnight Brain Institute. Barnes has been president of the Society for Neuroscience and is a Fellow of the American Association for the Advancement of Science, and foreign member of the Royal Norwegian Society of Sciences and Letters. She was elected to the National Academy of Sciences in 2018.

Barnes has produced over 250 peer reviewed publications. Broadly, her research is focused on the neurophysiological and behavioral changes that occur in the brain during aging. Understanding of these changes may shed light on the processes, that contribute to age-related neurodegenerative disorders such as Alzheimer's disease. Barnes also developed the Barnes maze, a spatial navigation memory task that is used to assess hippocampal-dependent memory.

== Education ==
Barnes received a Bachelors of Arts in psychology with honors at the University of California, Riverside, in 1971. She continued her education at Carleton University located in Ottawa, Canada, earning her Masters of Arts degree in psychology in 1972. In 1977, she graduated cum laude with a Ph.D. in psychology from Carleton University. Following her graduate work, Barnes took a position as a postdoctoral researcher in neuropsychology and neurophysiology in the department of psychology at Dalhousie University, another at the institute of neurophysiology of University of Oslo, as well as in cerebral function at University College London.

== Career ==
Barnes holds the position of Endowed Chair for Learning-Memory in Aging at The Evelyn F McKnight Brain Institute. She is also a regents professor and director of the Division of Neural Systems, Memory and Aging at the University of Arizona in Tucson, Arizona. Barnes is part of the BIO5 Institute that is funded by the Technology and Research Fund (TRIF). At the BIO5 institute she works with students addressing Alzheimer's disease and other age-related brain diseases. Barnes also teaches cancer biology, neuroscience, psychology, and physiological sciences.

== Research ==
Barnes is involved with the neuroscience research community on a national and local level. Barnes research spans 4 decades aiming to better understand the aging of the brain in relation to cognitive diseases. Barnes interest of normative aging in the brain stems from her grandfather when she and her family noticed that his memory was declining. Her research is conducted by utilizing animal models such as primates and rats to explore and understand how memory is impacted in the normal aging process of the brain and the neurobiological mechanisms that are involved. The use of animal models in Barnes research is translated into treatments used for abnormal functioning of the brain aimed at prolonging the cognitive lifespan of older individuals. The nature of Barnes research entails the use of behavioral, anatomical, electrophysiological and molecular techniques to examine the implications of normal aging on the brain. Most areas of her research involves examining and observing the hippocampal structure in the brains of rats and monkeys, observing and recording synaptic transmission in cell to cell signaling, and genomic sequencing.

=== Barnes Maze ===
To study spatial learning and memory, Carol Barnes utilized a maze to test whether mice could remember the location of an escape box on a platform. The Barnes Maze has become a standard tool of memory testing in laboratories. Designed in 1979, Barnes's maze was an alternative to study memory without the use of external reward or punishment, while also reducing the stress put on the animal throughout the process.

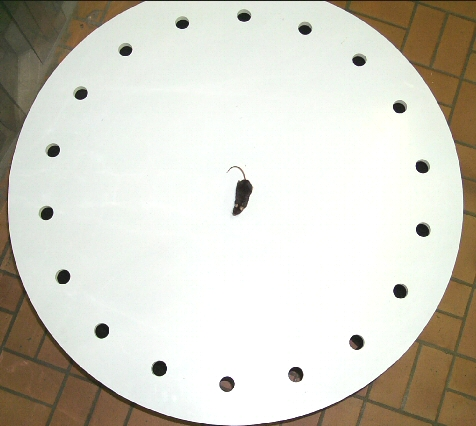
The Barnes maze

The original study consisted of a platform (122 cm diameter) raised 91 cm above the floor with 18 circular holes (9.5 cm diameters) spaced evenly around the perimeter. Under one of the holes is a black escape box, or any dark color in contrast to the color of the platform; the rest of the holes lead to false escape boxes.

The study consisted of 3 variations of the experiment. First, the mouse simply had to find the escape chamber that was placed under one of the holes. Second, the escape chamber was moved to a hole rotated 120-140 degrees from the original hole; the original hole was covered. Third, the same method as the second variation was used except the original hole was not covered. Barnes and her team found that overall, male mice performed better in all variations of the experiment. Further, they found younger mice also performed better in all variations, while older mice demonstrated notable difficulties in variations 2 and 3. This showed aging impairment in spatial memory.

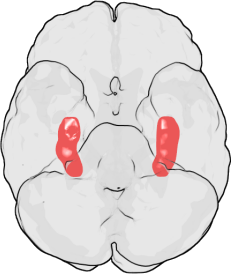
Hippocampus

Using MRI imaging techniques, Barnes and her team were able to see that in normally aged brains of rodents, the size of the hippocampus did not change. Instead, the volume of cortical grey matter did. This animal model allowed an understanding of what the brain looks like during normal human functioning. From this understanding, it was compared to brains that have been degenerated due to Alzheimer's disease (rodents do not exhibit AD). These findings demonstrate that during normal aging the hippocampus remains the same size, its function may decrease in comparison to functions of other areas of the brain.

Looking deeper into the tissue affected, single-cell imaging showed there were 3 main types of cells that make up the hippocampus. When observing cell activity and the number of cells of the hippocampus of rats, it was found that the CA1 and CA3 pyramidal cells continued to be active and of the same volume. However, the number of granule cells of the dentate gyrus continuously decreased with age; the function of these cells also declined leading Barnes and her team to conclude these gyrus cells are the weak link of the hippocampal circuit involved in memory.

=== Primate Research ===
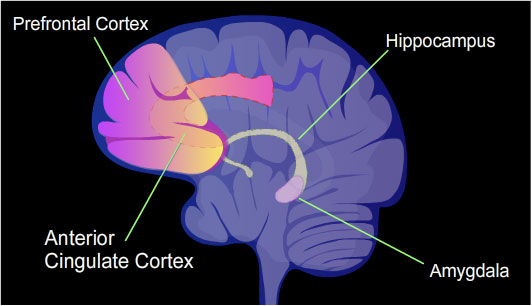
Brain regions involved in memory formation

In addition to work on rodent models, Barnes has helped advance the field of normative aging research using nonhuman primate models, specifically macaque monkeys. Primarily, Barnes's early work in macaques helped to tie together neurobiological data collected from rodents and functional imaging data from older humans. In the paper "Memory impairment in aged primates is associated with region-specific network dysfunction" Barnes and her team showed that older monkeys had significant impairment on object recognition.

In addition, older monkeys displayed a lower density of inhibitory somatostatin positive interneurons in the CA3 sub-region of the hippocampus. These interneurons are responsible for regulating the activity of excitatory neurons in the hippocampus. With less interneuron density, the baseline firing rate of CA3 excitatory neurons was elevated. This finding relates to the increased hippocampal activity shown in imaging studies of older human adults. Both a decrease in interneuron density and increase baseline firing rates in the hippocampus have been associated with poor cognition.

Furthermore, in the paper "Evidence for an evolutionarily conserved memory coding scheme in the mammalian hippocampus" Barnes and her team found evidence that all mammals require the same quantity of neurons in the hippocampus to encode memory of a single experience. This finding suggests that tall mammals use a stable amount of neurons to encode a similar virtual reality experience. However, due to variable hippocampus size, the proportion of neurons used for the encoding of experience differ. Rodents have the smallest hippocampus and thus use 40% of their hippocampus neurons for encoding, nonhuman primates have larger hippocampus and use 4%, and finally, humans have the largest hippocampus and use an estimated 2.5% for experiential encoding.

Barnes has also done research to observe executive function changes with normative aging. Executive functions are the higher-order process humans take part in such as attention, decision making, impulse control, and emotional control. These functions are mediated by the activity of the prefrontal cortex. Once again studying macaques, Barnes and her team focused on two aspects of executive function, attentional monitoring and updating as well as set shifting. Attentional monitoring and updating allow for behavior changes with corresponding rule changes. For example, when two options are presented one is the correct choice initially; however, when the correct choice changes to the second option, attentional monitoring and updating help correct for the rule change and alter behavior in order to choose correctly. The change in behavior is mediated through a process of trial and error, which helps associate the right choice with certain behaviors. Barnes and her team found that older monkeys needed a greater number of trials to accurately account for a rule change. Suggesting that the executive system behind attentional monitoring and updating is impaired with aging.

To study set shifting which is the ability to unconsciously shift attention between tasks while maintaining accuracy, Barnes presented macaque monkeys with an object recognition test of previously learned objects. She then presented interfering objects which required shifts between the object choice and evaluation of novel objects. Her results showed that older monkeys performed better on object recognition with this interference than younger monkeys. Thus set-shifting abilities seem to be maintained if not enhanced with aging.

The most important discovery out of these studies, however, is that the two aspects of executive function, monitoring and updating and set-shifting, were shown to be independent systems that are affected differently with age. Thus, Barnes and her team suggest that changes in the prefrontal cortex can result from aging but different sub-regions within it show different patterns of aging.

A final research contribution of Carol A Barnes involves the study of spatial networks and spatial memories in aging macaques. Barnes and her team studied brain activity in four different conditions for movement: cages, sitting, walking on a treadmill, and freely walking in space. The study found that younger macaques have distinct spatial networks for all four distinct conditions. However, older monkeys displayed less discrete activity of spatial networks. Meaning, all conditions evoked activation of the same undifferentiated network. This finding suggests dynamic network changes as a possible explanation for spatial cognition deficits. In other words, the spatial processing networks become less precise with age and may contribute to spatial memory loss or confusion.

== Mentoring ==
Barnes has been recognized by her peers and the public for her work in promoting opportunities for women and the underprivileged in neuroscience. In 2010, she received the Mika Salpeter Lifetime Achievement Award which "recognizes individuals with outstanding career achievements in neuroscience who have also actively promoted the professional advancement of women in neuroscience."

Furthermore, she is an active participant in the NIH Disadvantaged High School Student Research Program, Minority Access to Research Careers, and the McNair Achievement Program. In 2013 Barnes gave a keynote address at the Celebration of Women in Neuroscience entitled "The Evolving Face of Neuroscience: Role of Women and Globalization."

== Awards and honors ==
- 1969: National science Foundation Summer Research Fellowship National Science Foundation Summer Research Fellowship
- 1972–74: Ontario Graduate Fellowship Ontario Graduate Fellowship
- 1979–81: NIH National Research Service Award
- 1981–82: NATO Postdoctoral Fellowship in Science
- 1984–89: Research Career Development Award
- 1989–94: ADAMHA Research Scientist Development Award, National Institute of Mental Health
- 1994–99: ADAMHA Research Scientist Development Award, National Institute of Mental Health
- 2004–present: Foreign Member, Royal Norwegian Society of Sciences and Letters Natural Sciences
- 2004–14: MERIT Award, National Advisory Council on Aging
- 2004–14: Regents Professor, University of Arizona
- 2006–present: Endowed Chair: Evelyn F. McKnight Chair Learning and Memory in Aging
- 2009–present: Fellow, American Association for the Advancement of Science
- 2010: 2009 APA Division 6 D.B. Marquis Behavioral Neuroscience Award
- 2010: 2010 APA Division 6 D.B. Marquis Behavioral Neuroscience Award for Behavioral Neuroscience
- 2010: Mika Salpeter Lifetime Achievement Award
- 2011–present: Galileo Fellow, College of Science, University of Arizona
- 2013: Ralph W Gerard Prize in Neuroscience
- 2014: APA Award for Distinguished Scientific Contributions
- 2017: Quad-L Award
- 2017: MOCA Local Genius Award
- 2018: National Academy of Sciences

== Representative publications ==
- Barnes, C. A. (1979). Memory deficits associated with senescence: a neurophysiological and behavioral study in the rat. Journal of Comparative and Physiological Psychology, 93(1), 74–104. https://doi.org/10.1037/h0077579
- Barnes, C. A. (1988). Spatial learning and memory processes: the search for their neurobiological mechanisms in the rat. Trends in neurosciences, 11(4), 163–169. https://doi.org/10.1016/0166-2236(88)90143-9
- Barnes, C. A., & McNaughton, B. L. (1985). An age comparison of the rates of acquisition and forgetting of spatial information in relation to long-term enhancement of hippocampal synapses. Behavioral Neuroscience, 99(6), 1040–1048. https://doi.org/10.1037/0735-7044.99.6.1040
- Barnes, C. A., Nadel, L., & Honig, W. K. (1980). Spatial memory deficit in senescent rats. Canadian Journal of Psychology/Revue canadienne de psychologie, 34(1), 29–39. https://doi.org/10.1037/h0081022
- Barnes, C. A., Suster, M. S., Shen, J., & McNaughton, B. L. (1997). Multistability of cognitive maps in the hippocampus of old rats. Nature, 388(6639), 272-275. https://doi.org/10.1038/40859
