= T-maze =

Forked passage used in animal cognition tests

A T-maze, with food at the end of one arm and an empty bowl at the other

In behavioral science, a T-maze (or the variant Y-maze) is a simple forked passage used in animal cognition experiments. It is shaped like the letter T (or Y), providing the subject, typically a rodent, with a straightforward choice. T-mazes are used to study how the rodents function with memory and spatial learning through applying various stimuli. Starting in the early 20th century, rodents were used in experiments such as the T-maze. These concepts of T-mazes are used to assess rodent behavior. The different tasks, such as left-right discrimination and forced alternation, are mainly used with rodents to test reference and working memory.

== Apparatus ==
The T-maze is one of a group of various mazes of differing sizes and many shapes. It is one of the most simple, consisting of just two turns – right or left. The maze is only able to be altered by blocking one of the two paths. The basis behind the T-maze is to place the rat at the base of the maze. By placing a reward at one arm or both arms of the maze, the rat must make the choice of which path to take. The decision made by the rat can be a cause of a natural preference within the rat. A study of alternation can be performed by repeating the experiment multiple times with no reward in either arm of the maze. Another experiment that can be performed is the alternation of rewards each time the experiment is performed, proving the rat will choose the arm that was not visited each time the experiment starts.

Rewards within the maze can be types of food, another rat within a cage, an odor, or a type of shelter. By performing this type of experiment, the rat's preferences can be determined. Examples of this could be a rat's food preferences, its familiarity with specific smells and scents, the attraction of the male and female within the maze, and whether a young rat prefers an adult female or an adult male. These simple experiments can determine the rat's psyche on multiple subjects, and ultimately divulge further into the rat's psychological characteristics. It is also important to consider the rodent's behavior. The use of spatial and non-spatial cues is very influential to research findings on memory, spatial learning and the long-term potentiation (LTP). These cues include the orientation of the maze, extra-maze cues and room configuration cues. Strategies may be affected by the rodent's ability to find cues in the room, the presence or absence of polarizing cues in the room, and the stability of the maze in the room. When analyzing and interpreting experimental data, researchers have to consider the orientation and configuration of the apparatus and cues in the room.

=== Other mazes ===
==== Multiple T-maze ====
This type of apparatus includes multiple T-mazes connected which result in a very complex maze. It is constructed of a high number of T-junctions. Each intersection remains the same length and scale, which gives every point within the maze a direct right or wrong answer. By not changing the size of the maze, it allows for the rat to focus on the decision and not be confused if the size of the maze was altered within the junctions. Multiple T-mazes are constructed to question response vs. place techniques and of cognitive direction and mapping.

An example of an experiment within a multiple T-maze was performed by allowing the rat to explore the multiple T-maze without a reward. After letting the rat roam, researchers restarted the maze again with a reward placed at the end of the maze. The rats with prior exposure to the maze were able to easily navigate through the maze to reach the reward. This experiment proved that rats have the ability to generate a cognitive map when exposed to their surroundings and can process this information when needed to complete a task.

==== Y-maze ====
Researchers have also created the Y-maze which functions very similar to the T-maze. The Y-maze is altered to have a more gradual change into the arms. The arms are also all equal in length and distance apart from one another. The Y-maze has proven to be easier for rats to understand the layout of the space and recognize rewards, similar pattern, and adapt to new experiments at a quicker pace.

==== Radial arm maze ====
The radial arm maze is constructed with a center platform with arms radiating from the center. The original maze had 8 spokes, but they have been constructed with as few as 3 and as many as 48 spokes. This type of maze is used to perform short-term memory experiments on rats. Rats are examined on whether or not they have the ability to remember the arms they have already explored. This is determined by placing food pellets at each of the arms and the rat must only travel down each arm once and retrieve the pellet accordingly.

== Purpose ==
The concepts of T-mazes are used to assess rodent behavior. The different tasks such as left-right discrimination and forced alternation are mainly used with rodents to test reference and working memory. Maze research is used to show how the rodent's behavior evolves with alternate strategies to do different tasks.

== Spatial learning ==
The spatial memory of the rat is responsible for recording information about the rat's environment as well as its spatial orientation. It is this spatial memory that allows the rat to navigate its way through the various types of mazes and challenges presented to it by the experimenters. This also allows the rat to navigate the same maze multiple times while remembering the correct and incorrect pathways (unless the scientists change the paths in between tests). In the T-maze this is relegated to a single left or right turn, but in more complex mazes it becomes a series of turns for the rat to remember in order to reach its goal and reward. A poorly working spatial memory can result in a rat getting repeatedly lost in the maze regardless of how successful previous attempts were or how unchanged the maze is.

== Hippocampus ==
The hippocampus is located in the medial temporal lobe area of the brain and is responsible for governing spatial memory. In animals, this allows them to have a spatial map of their environment and it uses reference and working memory to accomplish this. It also has important functions that govern long and short-term memory as well as spatial navigation, both of which are required in order for the rat to correctly navigate the maze.

== See also ==
- Barnes maze
- Elevated plus maze
- Morris water navigation task
- Oasis maze
