= Spontaneous alternation =

Spontaneous Alternation Behavior (SAB) describes a research subject's tendency to pursue different stimuli in consecutive trials, despite a lack of training or reinforcement. The behavior emerged from experiments using animals (mainly rodents) who naturally demonstrated the behavioral pattern when placed in previously unexplored maze shapes, such as using T- or Y-mazes.

Spontaneous alternation testing is a behavioral assessment method derived from SAB. It is used to investigate exploratory behavior and cognitive function (related to spatial learning and memory). These assessments are most often done with non-human animals. The test serves great purpose in comparative psychology, wherein subjects are studied to investigate differences within and between species, with the aims of applying their findings to a greater understanding of human behavior. It is particularly useful in studying the potential neuroanatomical and neurobiological mediators of cognitive function. Seeing that there are ethical limitations posed in the physiological study of humans, there is greater opportunity for more invasive procedures to be ethically conducted on non-human animals.

== Explanations for spontaneous alternation ==
Earlier explanations for SAB thought the behavior was the result of reactive inhibition. According to drive reduction theory, the animal turns right in a T-maze after it has already turned left, as turning left the first time diminished the value of the tendency to do so again. The inhibitive response is cumulative and therefore repeats, resulting in SAB. Several experiments conducted in the 1950s refuted this theory, demonstrating SAB to be a stimulus-based behavior, as opposed to one which is response-based. These experiments point towards perception, attention, memory and motivation as psychological processes which produce SAB:

Perception: The pursuit of directional movement relies on the subject's manner of gathering information from its surroundings.

Attention: The subject selectively abstracts cues from the greater informational environment, informing their concentrate focus and influencing behavior.

Memory: In order to demonstrate a consistent alternating pattern in behavior, the cues which are attended to and perceived from the first arm of the maze must be stored and retrieved for the pursuit of the alternate arm to be initiated.

Motivation: As movement into either arm of the maze isn't traced, nor reinforced, the animal must have a purpose which is fulfilled by SAB that is not exclusively cognitive. Experimental research suggests that the behavior is underpinned by an innate drive towards exploring that which the unfamiliar or less familiar. In 1957, Dember and Earl described this to be "a manifestation of exploratory motivation' within their general theory of exploration and curiosity. The implied hardwiring of the behavior in the brain draws on the concept of evolutionary psychology. Estes and Schoeffler proposed in 1955 that SAB originated as an adaptive behavior which enabled animals to gather information related to the distribution of resources needed for survival, such as food and shelter. With this logic, an animal is likely motivated to enter environments in an alternating pattern, because they will have already exhausted the resources from that which they most recently visited.

== Spontaneous alternation and spatial working memory ==
There is research suggesting that efficient spatial alternation behaviour requires optimal spatial working memory.

Spatial working memory refers to the ability to retain spatial information in the form of environmental cues in the working memory, where it is stored temporarily and then elicited actively during the completion of a task. This allows one to build and continuously update cognitive spatial maps of novel environments as they are being explored, so that they are able to return to areas which they distinguish as less familiar, thereby optimizing information gathering strategies.

In tests where SAB is reduced, there is an indication of impairment in spatial working memory, as the subject's ability to distinguish where they have or have not been is diminished. As a result, spontaneous alternation tests are useful in investigating spatial working memory and the factors which may influence it.

Aging was found to be a factor which influences SAB. Spontaneous alternation testing with a Y-maze found that the frequency of the behavior reduces with age in mice at 9- and 12- months of age. Variation in physiological ability, such as motor function, did not account for this. Instead, the observations were attributed to gradual degradation in spatial learning. Anatomical changes to limbic and non-limbic pathways associated with normal and pathological aging in rodents correlate with the decrease in SAB. These include the neurochemical pathways in the hippocampus and basal forebrain – both of which are associated with spatial working memory and learning both in humans and rodents. Legions in the brain (particularly in the hippocampus), and various drugs can significantly impair spontaneous alteration. In another study done with mice, increasing the hormone estrogen showed improved spontaneous alteration performance. These findings may suggest a decrease in exploratory behavior as a result of associated neurobiological changes, implicating the capacity and function of spatial working memory.

== Apparatus design and test calculations ==
The apparatus used for spontaneous alternation testing takes multiple forms, with the T and Y-maze being the most common.

A rat is placed in the middle of the maze and allowed to move freely through each arm. Variations in apparatus (e.g. shape, material and incline) can result in subtle changes to the rate of SAB, though the general behavioral pattern persists.

SAB can be evaluated as a percentage indicating how frequently spontaneous alternation is observed across several trials. There are three outputs of the spontaneous alternation test:

- The first is the number of entries one makes into each arm of the maze – with an entry being defined by when the subject's hind paws crosses an arm's boundary completely.
- The second is the number of alternations the animal makes – with one alternation being the number of consecutive entries into each arm of the maze without any repeats in any order.
- The third is percentage alternation yielded putting the results of the first and second outputs being put into the following equation:

$$\%Alternations=100\left ( \frac{Number\ of \ Alternations}{Number \ of \ Entries} \right )$$

The cognition of the animal can be assessed based on the score, with a lower score being considered cognitively impaired. Chance is determined by the number of arms the maze has with a three-arm maze being 22%, a four-arm or greater maze being around 9%.

== Human infants ==
Spontaneous alteration was tested in human infants at the ages of 6 months and 18 months. The children were presented two identical toys placed in different spots. The six-month-old infants had no significant interchange with which toy they chose in subsequent trials, so the pattern of spontaneous alternation was not present. However, the 18-month-old infants did alternate between the toys, with curiosity motivating them to try the toy they had not previously chosen (the novel toy), displaying spontaneous alternation as well as spatial memory. Although both ages showed inhibition of return, only the 18-month-old children chose the novel toy. This suggests that inhibitory control is needed to, at least physically, perform spontaneous alteration.

== Stress ==
When testing the effects of stress on spontaneous alteration in mice, two different methods of stressors have been involved in research studies. The first is called the inescapable stressor, where the mouse could not escape the bright light being shined into the maze (open field test), and escapable, where the light was shining into the maze with covered areas for the mice to find shelter. These methods caused stress, because mice prefer dim areas to bright areas. The inescapable stressor caused the mice's spontaneous alteration to decrease, but the escapable stressor did not have an effect on their levels of spontaneous alteration.

== Criticisms ==
=== Animal Models ===
As a method predominantly used in studies involving non-human animals, there are contentions over the extent to which findings can extend towards humans in comparative psychology. While the spontaneous alternation test was designed to gain insight into human cognition and behavior, direct replication using human subjects is rarely conducted. Life-sized mazes are impractical to create and lack naturalism in their implementation, eliciting a number of confounding variables related to social desirability and demand characteristics. Proposals have been made for the use of virtual reality mazes to test SAB, with one study reporting that SAB was observed in a VR representation of a T-maze.

=== The Mere-Exposure Hypothesis ===
The mere-exposure effect reflects the tendency for animals to be drawn towards stimuli which is familiar. Addressing this contradiction to SAB, some experiments suggest that SAB is more likely to be demonstrated after the animal has been subjected to a period of long-term confinement to one environment, after which a preference for novel environments is built.
