= Oasis maze =

Test used in spatial memory research

The oasis maze is a spatial memory task used in psychology and neuroscience research and is the dry version of the Morris water navigation task. It is a land-based spatial memory task in which a thirsty rat uses distal spatial cues to search an open field for a specific location (Oasis) containing water. The maze consists of an enclosed space (usually the same shape and dimensions of the space used in the Morris water maze) in which a small amount of water is hidden. A thirsty rat is then placed in the maze and learns where the water is by trial and error. The maze tests memory by allowing the researcher to record the rat's performance on this task after it is learned and various time intervals or other events supposedly disruptive to memory have occurred.

== Apparatus ==
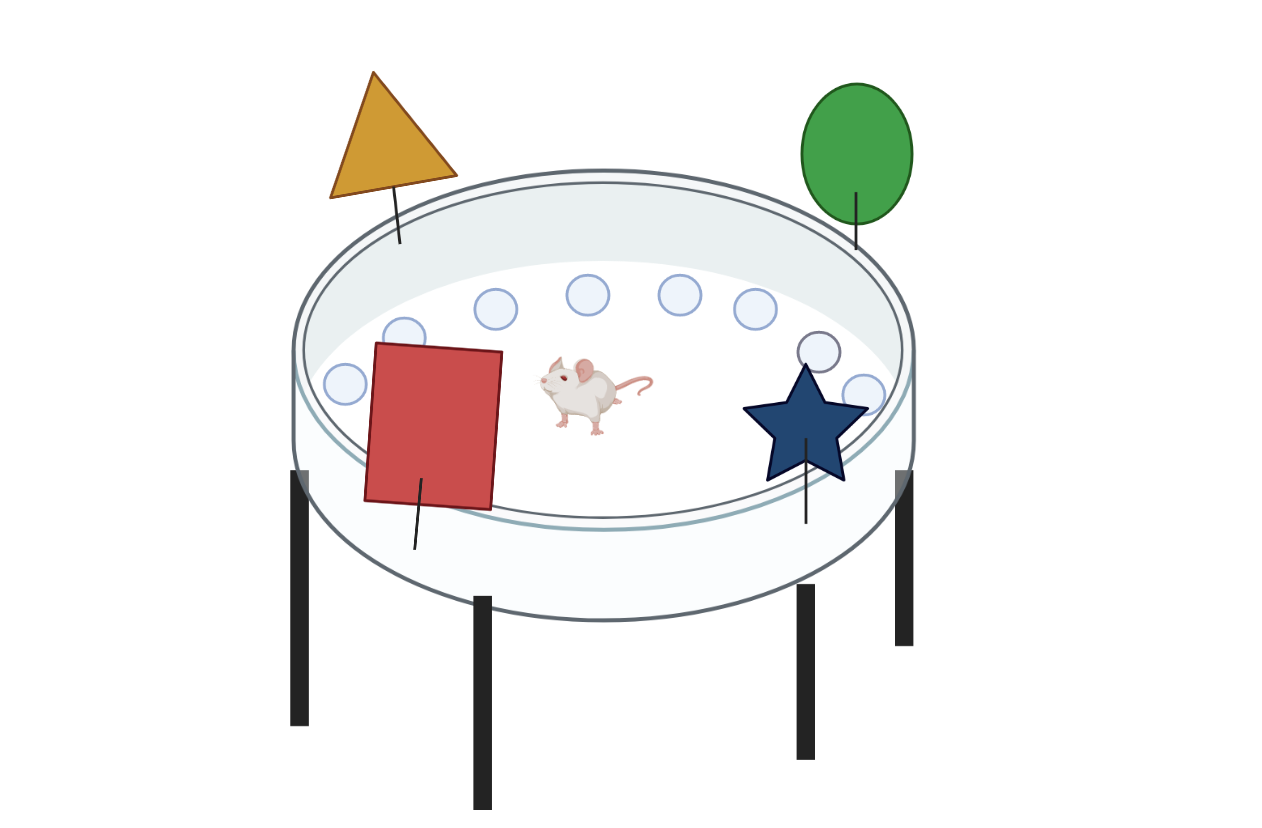

The Oasis maze is a circular, acrylic board (1.8 m in diameter) that is painted flat white and raised 76 cm from the floor by a table with a lazy Susan attached, allowing the board to be freely rotated about its central axis. The surface of the board contains 426 evenly spaced wells (2.5 cm in diameter, 1.3 cm in depth) in which small amounts of water (0.3 ml) can be hidden. Water is used as a reward because, unlike food rewards, rats cannot locate the water using olfactory cues.

== Phases ==
=== Pretraining ===
In the first phase, rats are water deprived by removing their water for 23 h/day for 3 days. Next, water is randomly placed in half of the 426 wells on the Oasis maze platform (0.3 ml per well), and the rats are given 5 min to find and drink as much water as they can on 2 occasions, separated by 30 min. The next day this procedure is repeated with only 25% of the wells containing water. On the final day, only 5 of the wells contain water. Pretraining on this day ends when the rats locate and consume water from all 5 baited wells.

=== Spatial training ===
Following pretraining, rats are given 8 trials a day for 10 days. On each trial, water is placed in a single well. For each rat, the water is always located in the same position relative to the testing room and distal spatial cues. Four different target well locations are used; 1 in the center of each quadrant, to control for any position biases the rats might have. The target well location to which each rat is assigned is counterbalanced within each experimental group. Local cues are made irrelevant (including odor trails) by rotating the entire apparatus a predetermined distance and direction after each trial. However, the water is always placed in the same location relative to the testing room and distal spatial cues.

In addition to the groups trained to find water by using spatial cues, another group (RANDOM) is given an equivalent amount of training, except that the location of the water varies randomly from trial to trial and could appear in any of the 426 wells. Thus, this group could develop optimal strategies for finding the water efficiently, but memory of specific locations is irrelevant. The RANDOM group provides a measure of where rats with no spatial memory of a trained location will spend their search time during probe trials. The probe trials for this group are administered 14 days after the end of training.

At the beginning of each acquisition trial, the rats are placed at 1 of 4 start points (North, South, East, and West) around the edge of the board. Across the 8 trials of each day (intertrial interval was approximately 15 min), 2 trials are given from each of the 4 start points, and the sequence is counterbalanced within each group. A trial is terminated when the rat locates the water or after 5 min, whichever comes first. If the rat fails to find the water within 5 min, it is guided to the correct well and allowed to drink. Once the water is located, the rat is allowed to drink the water before being returned to his home cage. Following each training session, the rats are allowed to drink freely for 1 h.

=== Retention probe ===
A 5-min probe trial is given a couple of weeks after training. The trial begins by placing the rat at 1 of 2 start points around the edge of the Oasis platform. Start points are always in 1 of the 2 quadrants adjacent to the quadrant that contains the training well location. For example, for rats with training wells in the North, start points for the probe trial are either West or East (counterbalanced within each group). No water is available during the probe trial.

Probe trials on the Oasis maze differ in 2 important ways from probe trials in the Morris water maze. First, 5-min probe trials are used, rather than 1-min probe trials, to ensure that rats explore a substantial portion of the Oasis maze. Second, in the Oasis maze rats have a strong tendency to explore the edges of the board and also to return to the start point. For these reasons, chance performance cannot be calculated in a straightforward way.

Chance performance can be estimated by assessing the performance of the RANDOM group (because rats in this group could not acquire a memory for a specific spatial location). To do this, the percentage of time that a trained rat spend within a 58-cm- diameter circle around the trained well is compared with the percentage of time that rats in the RANDOM group spend in this same region (target locations for the RANDOM group are counterbalanced across rats). A 58-cm circle is the diameter of the largest circle that could be completely contained within 1 quadrant of the maze.

== See also ==
- Barnes maze
- Morris water navigation task
