= Morris water navigation task =

Task used in experiments to measure spatial learning and memory

Schematic drawing of the Morris water navigation test for rats. Size and marker may vary.

The Morris water navigation task, also known as the Morris water maze (not to be confused with water maze), is a behavioral procedure used with rats or mice. It is widely used in behavioral neuroscience to study spatial learning and memory and the underlying brain mechanisms.

== Overview ==
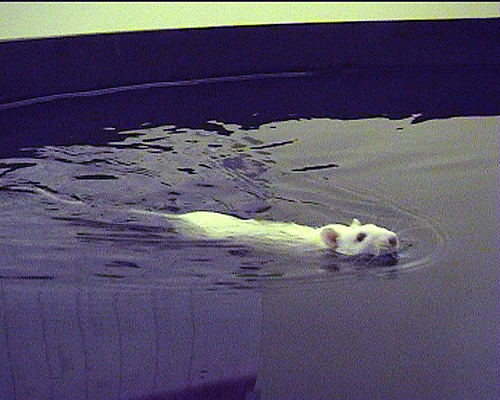
A rat undergoing a Morris water navigation test

The basic procedure for the Morris water navigation task is that the rat is placed in a large circular pool filled with water and is required to find a hidden platform that allows it to escape the water; the location of the hidden platform can be found by using spatial memory based on spatial cues arranged around the pool. Many factors can influence the rats' performance, including their sex, the environment in which they were raised, exposure to drugs, etc. There are three basic tactics for the rats to escape the maze: a praxic strategy (remembering the movements needed to get to the platform), a taxic strategy (the rat uses visual cues to reach their destinations), or spatial strategy (using distal cues as points of reference to locate themselves). There are a variety of paradigms for the water maze that can be used to examine different cognitive functions. For example, cognitive flexibility can be assessed using a water maze paradigm in which the hidden platform is continually re-located.

== History ==
The Morris water navigation task was conceived by Richard G. Morris (then at the University of St Andrews) in 1981 as an alternative to the radial maze. The test was developed to study spatial learning and how it differed from other forms of associative learning. Originally rats, now more commonly mice, were placed in an open pool and the latency to escape was measured for up to six trials a day for 2–14 days. Several variables are used to evaluate an animal's performance. For example, a "probe trial" measures how long the test subject spends in the "target quadrant" (the quadrant with the hidden platform). More elaborate trials alter the location of the hidden platform, or measure distance spent swimming in the pool before reaching the platform. Over the years, many different versions of this test have been performed with a large amount of variables. For example, neuroscientists examine the effect of differences of sex, weight, strength, stress levels, age, and strain of species. The results vary dramatically, so researchers cannot draw conclusions unless these variables are kept constant. Many different size pools have been used throughout the history of this task, but it has been shown that this does not have a significant impact on the results of the test. In early versions of the task, researchers only timed latency to escape, however video tracking devices are now routinely used to measure the path to escape, time spent in each quadrant, and distance traveled in the pool.

=== Original experiment ===
In Morris' first experiment, the apparatus was a large circular pool, 1.30 m across and 0.60 m high. The purpose of the original experiment was to show that spatial learning does not require the presence of local cues, meaning that rats can learn to locate an object without any auditory, visual, or olfactory cues.

== Analysis ==
The earliest measure of learning is escape latency, which is the time it takes the rat or mouse to find the platform. However, this measure is confounded by swimming speed, not necessarily a cognitive factor, and path length between point of origin and platform is a parameter more closely related to spatial learning. Further parameters are the Gallagher measure, the average distance to the platform, and the Whishaw corridor test, which measures time and path in a strip directly leading from swim-start to platform. Other parameters are measured during probe trials: the escape platform is removed and the mice or rats are allowed to search for it for a fixed time (often 60 seconds), during which the search preference for the correct location and its vicinity can be measured; variables measured include time and path length in different quadrants of the pool, time near platform, and platform crossings.

== Comparison to maze tasks ==
Like other spatial tasks, such as the T-maze and radial arm maze, the Morris water navigation task is supposed to measure spatial memory, movement control, and cognitive mapping. The T-maze and radial arm maze are much more structured in comparison. The T-maze, for instance, only requires the rat or mouse to make a binary decision, choose left or right (or East or West). In the Morris water navigation task, on the other hand, the animal needs to decide continually where to go. Another reason this task became popular is that rats (but not mice) are natural swimmers, but dislike colder water (mice simply dislike water of any temperature), so in order to perform the task they do not need to be motivated by food deprivation or electrical shock. The mobility of the platform allows for experiments on learning and relearning. Also, the apparatus set-up and costs are relatively low.

== Weaknesses ==
Changes in measures of Morris water navigation task performance may not necessarily reflect specific impairments in mechanisms of spatial learning or memory. The reason for a longer time spent looking for the platform, or the lack of searching in the target quadrant, may not necessarily have to do with an effect on the rat's or mouse's spatial memory, but can be due to other factors. For example, a large study of Morris water navigation task performance in mice concluded that almost half of all variance in performance scores was due to differences in thigmotaxis, the tendency of mice to stay close to the walls of the pool. About 20% of the variability was explained by differing tendencies of mice to float passively in the water until "rescued" by the experimenter. Differences in spatial memory were only the third factor, explaining just 13% of the variation between animals' performance.

== See also ==
- Oasis maze
- Barnes maze
- Elevated plus maze
