= 5-Hydroxyuracil =

Names
- IUPAC name 2,4,5-Pyrimidinetriol
- Other names 5-Hydroxy-2,4(1H,3H)-pyrimidinedione

Identifiers
CAS Number	496-76-4
3D model (JSmol)	Interactive image
ChEBI	CHEBI:29115
ChEMBL	ChEMBL1561505
ChemSpider	66014
ECHA InfoCard	100.007.119
EC Number	207-829-9
PubChem CID	73268
UNII	438WJI1S49
CompTox Dashboard (EPA)	DTXSID30174667
- InChI: InChI=1S/C4H4N2O3/c7-2-1-5-4(9)6-3(2)8/h1,7H,(H2,5,6,8,9) Key: OFJNVANOCZHTMW-UHFFFAOYSA-N
- SMILES: c1c(c(nc(n1)O)O)O

Properties
Chemical formula	C_{4}H_{4}N_{2}O_{3}
Molar mass	128.087 g·mol^{−1}
- Except where otherwise noted, data are given for materials in their standard state (at 25 °C [77 °F], 100 kPa). Infobox references

5-Hydroxyuracil is an oxidized form of cytosine that is produced by the oxidative deamination of cytosines by reactive oxygen species. It does not distort the DNA molecule and is bypassed by replicative DNA polymerases. It can miscode for adenine and is potentially mutagenic.
