= Radial arm maze =

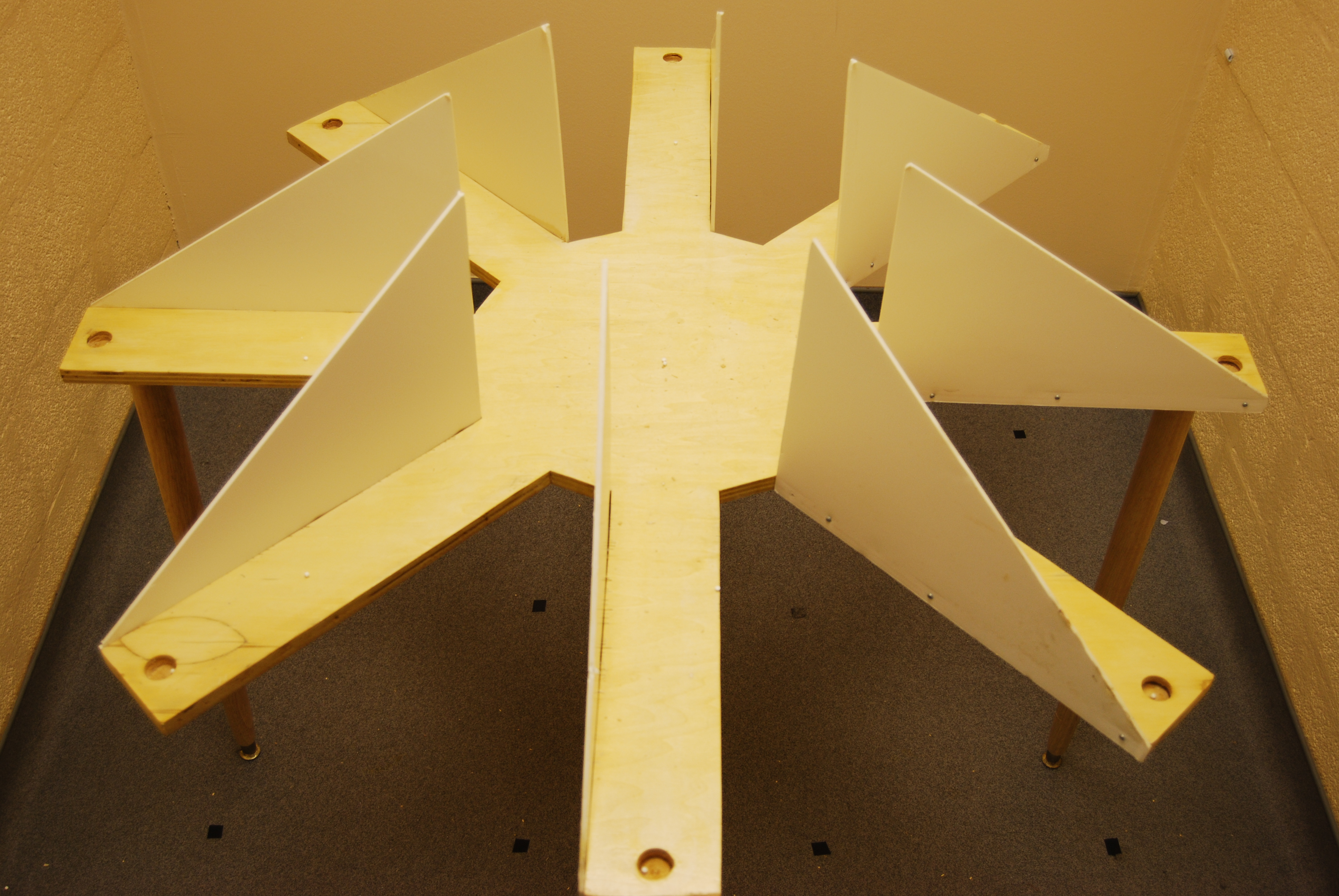
A simple homemade eight-arm radial arm maze with sidewalls to prevent interarm traverses

The radial arm maze was designed by Olton and Samuelson in 1976 to measure spatial learning and memory in rats. The original apparatus consists of eight equidistantly spaced arms, each about 4 feet long, and all radiating from a small circular central platform (later versions have used as few as three and as many as 48 arms). At the end of each arm there is a food site, the contents of which are not visible from the central platform.

Two types of memory that are assessed during the performance in this task are reference memory and working memory. Reference memory is assessed when the rats only visit the arms of the maze which contains the reward. The failure to do so will result in reference memory error. Working memory is assessed when the rats enter each arm a single time. Re-entry into the arms would result in a working memory error.

The design ensures that, after checking for food at the end of each arm, the rat is always forced to return to the central platform before making another choice. As a result, the rat always has eight possible options. Elaborate controls are used to ensure that the rats are not simply using their sense of smell, either to sense unclaimed food objects or to sense their own tracks.

Olton and Samuelson found that rats have excellent memories for visited and unvisited arms; they made, on average, about 7.0 novel entries in their first 8 choices, and thus were 88% correct. Chance performance with eight arms would be 5.3 novel entries in the first 8 choices (66% correct). Olton and Samuelson also found when they switched some already-visited arms into as yet unvisited locations partway through a trial, that the rats tended to visit as-yet unvisited locations even when doing so meant running down arms that had already been traversed, and tended to avoid arms that had not yet been traversed but were now in previously visited locations. It therefore seems that in remembering locations on the radial arm maze, rats do not rely on local intra-maze cues, but rather on extra-maze cues.

== Uses ==
The maze has since been used extensively by researchers interested in studying the spatial learning and spatial memory of animals. For example, Olton and colleagues found that performance declined only slightly to 82% novel entries in the first 17 entries on a 17-arm maze. Roberts found no decline in the percentage of correct choices as the number of arms on a radial maze were increased from 8 to 16 and then to 24. Cole and Chappell-Stephenson, using a radial maze with food locations ranging from 8 to 48, estimated the limit of spatial memory in rats to be between 24 and 32 locations.

In one experiment utilizing the radial arm maze, it was shown that spatial relations among hidden target sites control spatial decisions that rats make and are unrelated to visual or perceptual cues that are related to certain locations.

In another experiment, it was shown that subjects with Williams syndrome performed significantly worse compared to control subjects in multiple parameters such as visuo-spatial memory, general spatial function, and procedural competence.

In mice, large differences in learning ability exist among different inbred strains. These differences appear to be correlated with the size of a part of the hippocampal mossy fiber projection.

The radial arm maze has shown to be practicable to investigate how drugs affect memory performance. It has also been shown to be useful in distinguishing the cognitive effects of an array of toxicants.

The radial arm maze has also been use for several studies in children and adults. A particular study led by L. Mandolesi used subjects with William's Syndrome (WS) because of the interest placed on their cognitive profile. There is a dissociation between spatial processing and visuo-object processing suggests that in WS subjects spatial functions are more severely impaired than visuo-perceptual ones. This is what RAM tests for.

== Limitations ==
Various different types of mazes are used to assess memory. It is believed that performance of animals in one type of maze cannot be generalized to other mazes because all mazes require animals to utilize a different set of skills.

== See also ==
- Spontaneous alternation
