= Spatial memory =

Memory about one's environment and spatial orientation

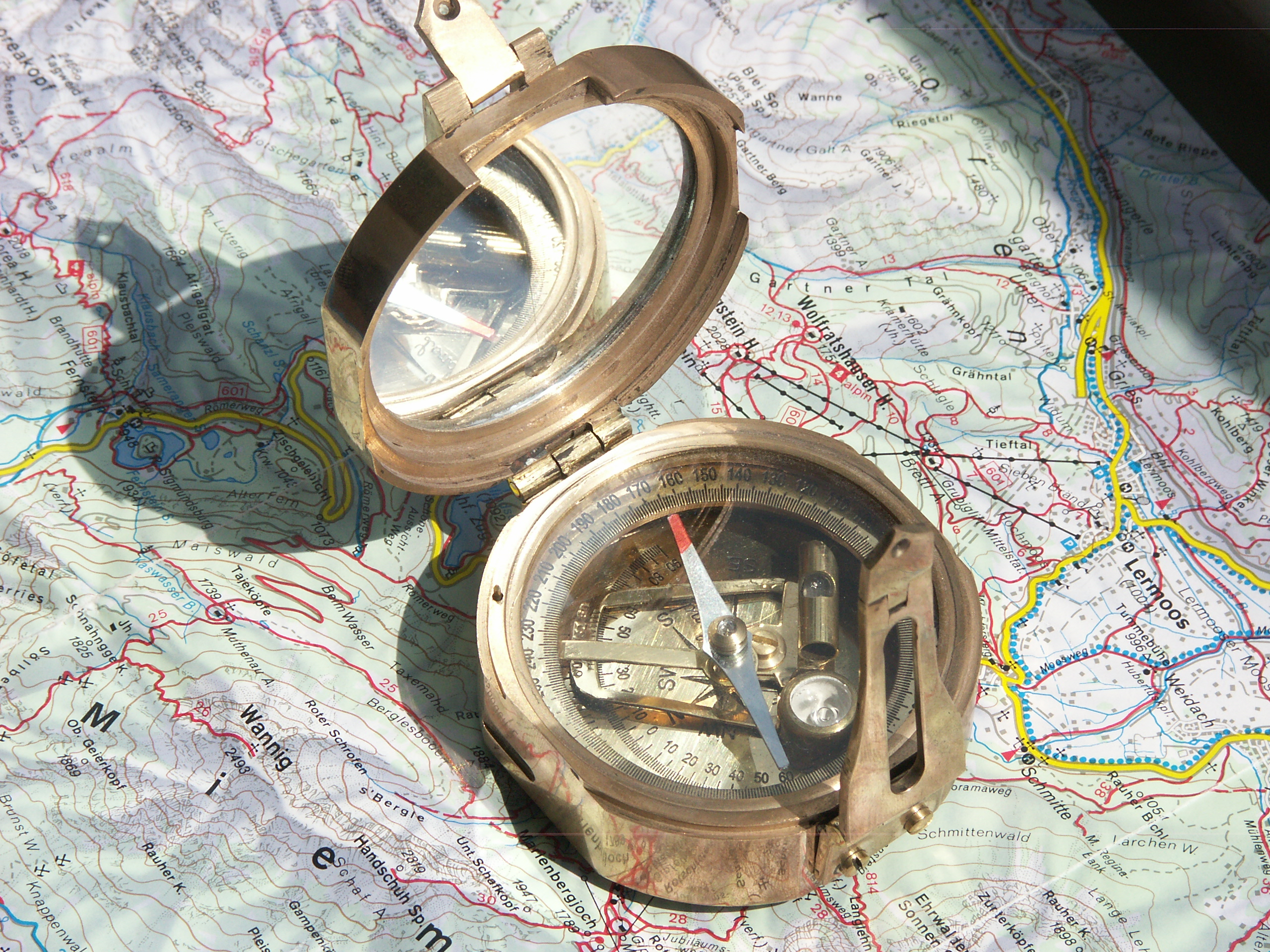
Spatial memory is required to navigate in an environment.

In cognitive psychology and neuroscience, spatial memory is a form of memory responsible for the recording and recovery of information needed to plan a course to a location and to recall the location of an object or the occurrence of an event. Spatial memory is necessary for orientation in space. Spatial memory can also be divided into egocentric and allocentric spatial memory. A person's spatial memory is required to navigate in a familiar city. A rat's spatial memory is needed to learn the location of food at the end of a maze. In humans and animals, spatial memories are summarized as a cognitive map.

Spatial memory has representations within working, short-term memory and long-term memory. Research indicates that there are specific areas of the brain associated with spatial memory. Many methods are used for measuring spatial memory in children, adults, and animals.

== Short-term spatial memory ==
Short-term memory (STM) can be described as a system allowing one to temporarily store and manage information that is necessary to complete complex cognitive tasks. Tasks which employ short-term memory include learning, reasoning, and comprehension. Spatial memory is a cognitive process that enables a person to remember different locations as well as spatial relations between objects. This allows one to remember where an object is in relation to another object; for instance, allowing someone to navigate in a familiar city. Spatial memories are said to form after a person has already gathered and processed sensory information about their environment.

== Spatial working memory ==
Working memory (WM) can be described as a limited capacity system that allows one to temporarily store and process information. This temporary store enables one to complete or work on complex tasks while being able to keep information in mind. For instance, the ability to work on a complicated mathematical problem utilizes one's working memory.

One influential theory of WM is the Baddeley and Hitch multi-component model of working memory. The most recent version of this model suggests that there are four subcomponents to WM: phonological loop, the visuo-spatial sketchpad, the central executive, and the episodic buffer. One component of this model, the visuo-spatial sketchpad, is likely responsible for the temporary storage, maintenance, and manipulation of both visual and spatial information.

The Working Memory Model (Baddeley and Hitch, 1974, revised 2000)

In contrast to the multi-component model, some researchers believe that STM should be viewed as a unitary construct. In this respect, visual, spatial, and verbal information are thought to be organized by levels of representation rather than the type of store to which they belong. Within the literature, it is suggested that further research into the fractionation of STM and WM be explored. However, much of the research into the visuo-spatial memory construct have been conducted in accordance to the paradigm advanced by Baddeley and Hitch.

=== The role of the central executive ===
Research into the exact function of the visuo-spatial sketchpad has indicated that both spatial short-term memory and working memory are dependent on executive resources and are not entirely distinct. For instance, performance on a working memory but not on a short-term memory task was affected by articulatory suppression suggesting that impairment on the spatial task was caused by the concurrent performance on a task that had extensive use of executive resources. Results have also found that performances were impaired on STM and WM tasks with executive suppression. This illustrates how, within the visuo-spatial domain, both STM and WM require similar utility of the central executive.

Additionally, during a spatial visualisation task (which is related to executive functioning and not STM or WM) concurrent executive suppression impaired performance indicating that the effects were due to common demands on the central executive and not short-term storage. The researchers concluded with the explanation that the central executive employs cognitive strategies enabling participants to both encode and maintain mental representations during short-term memory tasks.

Although studies suggest that the central executive is intimately involved in a number of spatial tasks, the exact way in which they are connected remains to be seen.

== Long-term spatial memory ==
Spatial memory recall is built upon a hierarchical structure. People remember the general layout of a particular space and then "cue target locations" within that spatial set. This paradigm includes an ordinal scale of features that an individual must attend to in order to inform his or her cognitive map. Recollection of spatial details is a top-down procedure that requires an individual to recall the superordinate features of a cognitive map, followed by the ordinate and subordinate features. Two spatial features are prominent in navigating a path: general layout and landmark orienting (Kahana et al., 2006). People are not only capable of learning about the spatial layout of their surroundings, but they can also piece together novel routes and new spatial relations through inference.

A cognitive map is "a mental model of objects' spatial configuration that permits navigation along optimal path between arbitrary pairs of points." This mental map is built upon two fundamental bedrocks: layout, also known as route knowledge, and landmark orientation. Layout is potentially the first method of navigation that people learn to utilize; its workings reflect our most basic understandings of the world.

Hermer and Spelke (1994) determined that when toddlers begin to walk, around eighteen months, they navigate by their sense of the world's layout. McNamara, Hardy and Hirtle identified region membership as a major building block of anyone's cognitive map (1989). Specifically, region membership is defined by any kind of boundary, whether physical, perceptual or subjective (McNamara et al., 1989). Boundaries are among the most basic and endemic qualities in the world around us. These boundaries are nothing more than axial lines which are a feature that people are biased towards when relating to space; for example, one axial line determinant is gravity. Axial lines aid everyone in apportioning our perceptions into regions. This parceled world idea is further supported by the finding that items that get recalled together are more likely than not to also be clustered within the same region of one's larger cognitive map. Clustering shows that people tend to chunk information together according to smaller layouts within a larger cognitive map.

Boundaries are not the only determinants of layout. Clustering also demonstrates another important property of relation to spatial conceptions, which is that spatial recall is a hierarchical process. When someone recalls an environment or navigates terrain, that person implicitly recalls the overall layout at first. Then, due to the concept's "rich correlational structure", a series of associations become activated. Eventually, the resulting cascade of activations will awaken the particular details that correspond with the region being recalled. This is how people encode many entities from varying ontological levels, such as the location of a stapler; in a desk; which is in the office.

One can recall from only one region at a time (a bottleneck). A bottleneck in a person's cognitive navigational system could be an issue. For instance, if there were a need for a sudden detour on a long road trip. Lack of experience in a locale, or simply sheer size, can disorient one's mental layout, especially in a large and unfamiliar place with many overwhelming stimuli. In these environments, people are still able to orient themselves, and find their way around using landmarks. This ability to "prioritize objects and regions in complex scenes for selection (and) recognition" was labeled by Chun and Jiang in 1998. Landmarks give people guidance by activating "learned associations between the global context and target locations." Mallot and Gillner (2000) showed that subjects learned an association between a specific landmark and the direction of a turn, thereby furthering the relationship between associations and landmarks. Shelton and McNamara (2001) succinctly summed up why landmarks, as markers, are so helpful: "location...cannot be described without making reference to the orientation of the observer."

People use both the layout of a particular space and the presence of orienting landmarks in order to navigate. Psychologists have yet to explain whether layout affects landmarks or if landmarks determine the boundaries of a layout. Because of this, the concept suffers from a chicken and the egg paradox. McNamara has found that subjects use "clusters of landmarks as intrinsic frames of reference," which only confuses the issue further.

People perceive objects in their environment relative to other objects in that same environment. Landmarks and layout are complementary systems for spatial recall, but it is unknown how these two systems interact when both types of information are available. As a result, people have to make certain assumptions about the interaction between the two systems. For example, cognitive maps are not "absolute" but rather, as anyone can attest, are "used to provide a default...(which) modulated according to...task demands." Psychologists also think that cognitive maps are instance based, which accounts for "discriminative matching to past experience."

This field has traditionally been hampered by confounding variables, such as cost and the potential for previous exposure to an experimental environment. Technological advancements, including those in virtual reality technology, have made findings more accessible. Virtual reality affords experimenters the luxury of extreme control over their test environment. Any variable can be manipulated, including things that would not be possible in reality.

== Virtual reality ==
During a 2006 study, researchers designed three different virtual towns, each of which had its own "unique road layout and a unique set of five stores." However, the overall footprint of the different maps was exactly the same size, 80 sq. units. In this experiment, participants had to partake in two different sets of trials.

A study conducted at the University of Maryland compared the effect of different levels of immersion on spatial memory recall. In the study, 40 participants used both a traditional desktop and a head-mounted display to view two environments, a medieval town, and an ornate palace, where they memorized two sets of 21 faces presented as 3D portraits. After viewing these 21 faces for 5 minutes, followed by a brief rest period, the faces in the virtual environments were replaced with numbers, and participants recalled which face was at each location. The study found on average, those who used the head-mounted display recalled the faces 8.8% more accurately, and with a greater confidence. The participants state that leveraging their innate vestibular and proprioceptive senses with the head-mounted display and mapping aspects of the environment relative to their body, elements that are absent with the desktop, was key to their success.

=== Spatial expertise ===
Within the literature, there is evidence that experts in a particular field are able to perform memory tasks in accordance with their skills at an exceptional level. The level of skill displayed by experts may exceed the limits of the normal capacity of both STM and WM. Because experts have an enormous amount of prelearned and task-specific knowledge, they may be able to encode information in a more efficient way.

An interesting study investigating taxi drivers' memory for streets in Helsinki, Finland, examined the role of prelearned spatial knowledge. This study compared experts to a control group to determine how this prelearned knowledge in their skill domain allows them to overcome the capacity limitations of STM and WM. The study used four levels of spatial randomness:

- Route Order – spatially continuous route
- Route Random – spatially continuous list presented randomly
- Map Order – street names forming a straight line on the map, but omitting intermediate streets
- Map Random – streets on map presented in random order

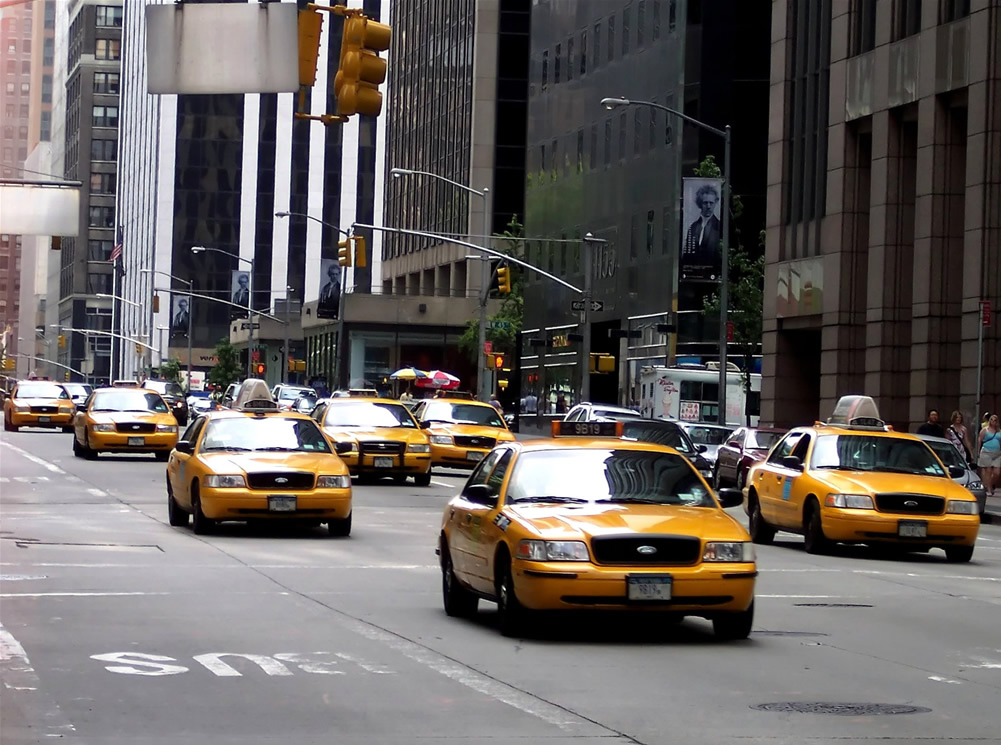
Yellow taxi cabs in New York city

The results of this study indicate that the taxi drivers' (experts') recall of streets was higher in both the route order condition and the map order condition than in the two random conditions. This indicates that the experts were able to use their prelearned spatial knowledge to organize the information in such a way that they surpassed STM and WM capacity limitations. The organization strategy that the drivers employed is known as chunking. Additionally, the comments made by the experts during the procedure point towards their use of route knowledge in completing the task. To ensure that it was in fact spatial information that they were encoding, the researchers also presented lists in alphabetical order and semantic categories. However, the researchers found that it was in fact spatial information that the experts were chunking, allowing them to surpass the limitations of both visuo-spatial STM and WM.

=== Animal research ===
Certain species of paridae and corvidae (such as the black-capped chickadee and the scrub jay) are able to use spatial memory to remember where, when and what type of food they have cached. Studies on rats and squirrels have also suggested that they are able to use spatial memory to locate previously hidden food. Experiments using the radial maze have allowed researchers to control for a number of variables, such as the type of food hidden, the locations where the food is hidden, the retention interval, as well as any odor cues that could skew results of memory research. Studies have indicated that rats have memory for where they have hidden food and what type of food they have hidden. This is shown in retrieval behavior, such that the rats are selective in going more often to the arms of the maze where they have previously hidden preferred food than to arms with less preferred food or where no food was hidden.

The evidence for the spatial memory of some species of animals, such as rats, indicates that they do use spatial memory to locate and retrieve hidden food stores.

A study using GPS tracking to see where domestic cats go when their owners let them outside reported that cats have substantial spatial memory. Some of the cats in the study demonstrated exceptional long term spatial memory. One of them, usually traveling no further than 200 m (660 ft) to 250 m (820 ft) from its home, unexpectedly traveled some 1,250 m (4,100 ft) from its home. Researchers initially thought this to be a GPS malfunction, but soon discovered that the cat's owners went out of town that weekend, and that the house the cat went to was the owner's old house. The owners and the cat had not lived in that house for well over a year.

== Visual–spatial distinction ==
Logie (1995) proposed that the visuo-spatial sketchpad is broken down into two subcomponents, one visual and one spatial. These are the visual cache and the inner scribe, respectively. The visual cache is a temporary visual store including such dimensions as color and shape. Conversely, the inner scribe is a rehearsal mechanism for visual information and is responsible for information concerning movement sequences. Although a general lack of consensus regarding this distinction has been noted in the literature, there is a growing amount of evidence that the two components are separate and serve different functions.

Visual memory is responsible for retaining visual shapes and colors (i.e., what), whereas spatial memory is responsible for information about locations and movement (i.e., where). This distinction is not always straightforward since part of visual memory involves spatial information and vice versa. For example, memory for object shapes usually involves maintaining information about the spatial arrangement of the features which define the object in question.

In practice, the two systems work together in some capacity but different tasks have been developed to highlight the unique abilities involved in either visual or spatial memory. For example, the visual patterns test (VPT) measures visual span whereas the Corsi blocks task measures spatial span. Correlational studies of the two measures suggest a separation between visual and spatial abilities, due to a lack of correlation found between them in both healthy and brain damaged patients.

Support for the division of visual and spatial memory components is found through experiments using the dual-task paradigm. A number of studies have shown that the retention of visual shapes or colors (i.e., visual information) is disrupted by the presentation of irrelevant pictures or dynamic visual noise. Conversely, the retention of location (i.e., spatial information) is disrupted only by spatial tracking tasks, spatial tapping tasks, and eye movements. For example, participants completed both the VPT and the Corsi blocks task in a selective interference experiment. During the retention interval of the VPT, the subject viewed irrelevant pictures (e.g., avant-garde paintings). The spatial interference task required participants to follow, by touching the stimuli, an arrangement of small wooden pegs which were concealed behind a screen. Both the visual and spatial spans were shortened by their respective interference tasks, confirming that the Corsi blocks task relates primarily to spatial working memory.

== Measurement ==
There are a variety of tasks psychologists use to measure spatial memory on adults, children and animal models. These tasks allow professionals to identify cognitive irregularities in adults and children and allows researchers to administer varying types of drugs and/or lesions in participants and measure the consequential effects on spatial memory.

=== The Corsi block tapping task ===
The Corsi block-tapping test, also known as the Corsi span rest, is a psychological test commonly used to determine the visual-spatial memory span and the implicit visual-spatial learning abilities of an individual. Participants sit with nine wooden 3x3-cm blocks fastened before them on a 25- x 30-cm baseboard in a standard random order. The experiment taps onto the blocks a sequence pattern which participants must then replicate. The blocks are numbered on the experimenters' side to allow for efficient pattern demonstration. The sequence length increases each trial until the participant is no longer able to replicate the pattern correctly. The test can be used to measure both short-term and long-term spatial memory, depending on the length of time between test and recall.

The test was created by Canadian neuropsychologist Phillip Corsi, who modeled it after Hebb's digit span task by replacing the numerical test items with spatial ones. On average, most participants achieve a span of five items on the Corsi span test and seven on the digit span task.

=== Visual pattern span ===
The visual pattern span is similar to the Corsi block tapping test but regarded as a purer test of visual short-term recall. Participants are presented with a series of matrix patterns that have half their cells colored and the other half blank. The matrix patterns are arranged in a way that is difficult to code verbally, forcing the participant to rely on visual spatial memory. Beginning with a small 2 x 2 matrix, participants copy the matrix pattern from memory into an empty matrix. The matrix patterns are increased in size and complexity at a rate of two cells until the participant's ability to replicate them breaks down. On average, participants' performance tends to break down at sixteen cells.

=== Pathway span task ===
This task is designed to measure spatial memory abilities in children. The experimenter asks the participant to visualize a blank matrix with a little man. Through a series of directional instructions such as forwards, backwards, left or right, the experimenter guides the participant's little man on a pathway throughout the matrix. At the end, the participant is asked to indicate on a real matrix where the little man that he or she visualized finished. The length of the pathway varies depending on the level of difficulty (1–10) and the matrices themselves may vary in length from 2 x 2 cells to 6 x 6.

=== Dynamic mazes ===
Dynamic mazes are intended for measuring spatial ability in children. With this test, an experimenter presents the participant with a drawing of a maze with a picture of a man in the center. While the participant watches, the experimenter uses his or her finger to trace a pathway from the opening of the maze to the drawing of the man. The participant is then expected to replicate the demonstrated pathway through the maze to the drawing of the man. Mazes vary in complexity as difficulty increases.

=== Radial arm maze ===
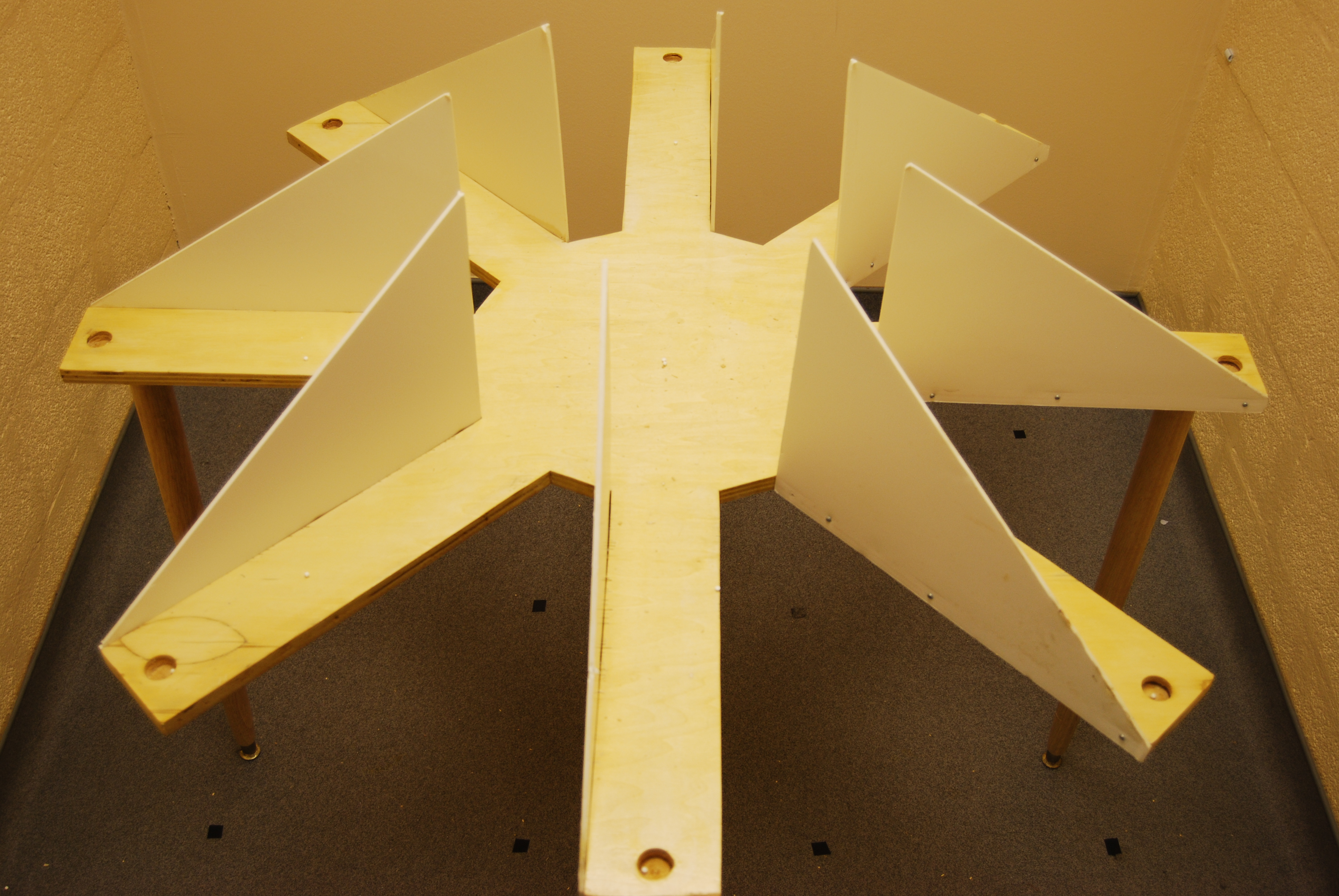
Simple Radial Maze

First pioneered by Olton and Samuelson in 1976, the radial arm maze is designed to test the spatial memory capabilities of rats. Mazes are typically designed with a center platform and a varying number of arms branching off with food placed at the ends. The arms are usually shielded from each other in some way but not to the extent that external cues cannot be used as reference points.

In most cases, the rat is placed in the center of the maze and needs to explore each arm individually to retrieve food while simultaneously remembering which arms it has already pursued. The maze is set up so the rat is forced to return to the center of the maze before pursuing another arm. Measures are usually taken to prevent the rat from using its olfactory senses to navigate such as placing extra food throughout the bottom of the maze.

=== Morris water navigation task ===
The Morris water navigation task is a classic test for studying spatial learning and memory in rats and was first developed in 1981 by Richard G. Morris for whom the test is named. The subject is placed in a round tank of translucent water with walls that are too high for it to climb out and water that is too deep for it to stand in. The walls of the tank are decorated with visual cues to serve as reference points. The rat must swim around the pool until by chance it discovers just below the surface the hidden platform onto which it can climb.

Typically, rats swim around the edge of the pool first before venturing out into the center in a meandering pattern before stumbling upon the hidden platform. However, as time spent in the pool increases experience, the amount of time needed to locate the platform decreases, with veteran rats swimming directly to the platform almost immediately after being placed in the water. Due to the nature of task involving rats to swim, most researchers believe that habituation is required to decrease the stress levels of the animal. The stress of the animal may impair cognitive testing results.

== Physiology ==
=== Hippocampus ===
Hippocampus shown in red

The hippocampus provides animals with a spatial map of their environment. It stores information regarding non-egocentric space (egocentric means in reference to one's body position in space) and therefore supports viewpoint independence in spatial memory. This means that it allows for viewpoint manipulation from memory. It is important for long-term spatial memory of allocentric space (reference to external cues in space). Maintenance and retrieval of memories are thus relational or context dependent. The hippocampus makes use of reference and working memory and has the important role of processing information about spatial locations.

Blocking plasticity in this region results in problems in goal-directed navigation and impairs the ability to remember precise locations. Amnesic patients with damage to the hippocampus cannot learn or remember spatial layouts, and patients having undergone hippocampal removal are severely impaired in spatial navigation.

Monkeys with lesions to this area cannot learn object-place associations and rats also display spatial deficits by not reacting to spatial change. In addition, rats with hippocampal lesions were shown to have temporally ungraded (time-independent) retrograde amnesia that is resistant to recognition of a learned platform task only when the entire hippocampus is lesioned, but not when it is partially lesioned. Deficits in spatial memory are also found in spatial discrimination tasks.

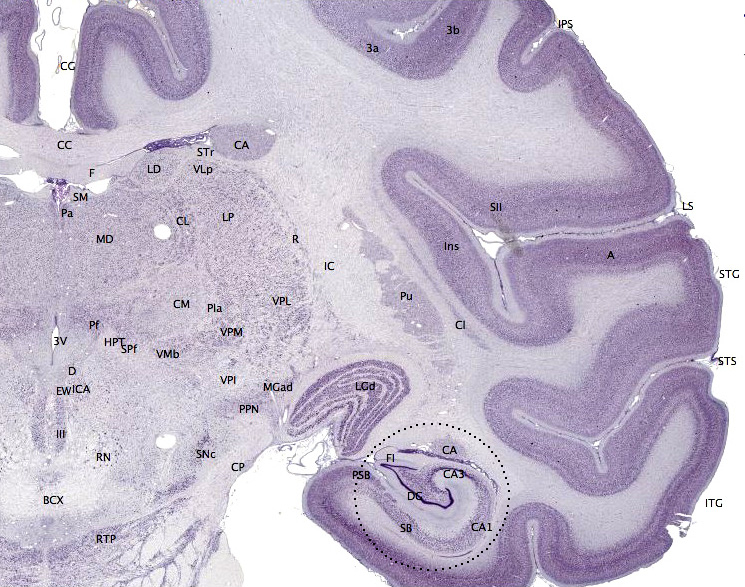
Brain slice showing areas CA1 and CA3 in the hippocampus

Large differences in spatial impairment are found among the dorsal and ventral hippocampus. Lesions to the ventral hippocampus have no effect on spatial memory, while the dorsal hippocampus is required for retrieval, processing short-term memory and transferring memory from the short term to longer delay periods. Infusion of amphetamine into the dorsal hippocampus has also been shown to enhance memory for spatial locations learned previously. These findings indicate that there is a functional dissociation between the dorsal and ventral hippocampus.

Hemispheric differences within the hippocampus are also observed. A study on London taxi drivers, asked drivers to recall complex routes around the city as well as famous landmarks for which the drivers had no knowledge of their spatial location. This resulted in an activation of the right hippocampus solely during recall of the complex routes which indicates that the right hippocampus is used for navigation in large scale spatial environments.

The hippocampus is known to contain two separate memory circuits. One circuit is used for recollection-based place recognition memory and includes the entorhinal-CA1 system, while the other system, consisting of the hippocampus trisynaptic loop (entohinal-dentate-CA3-CA1) is used for place recall memory and facilitation of plasticity at the entorhinal-dentate synapse in mice is sufficient to enhance place recall.

Place cells are also found in the hippocampus.

=== Posterior parietal cortex ===
Parietal lobe shown in red

The parietal cortex encodes spatial information using an egocentric frame of reference. It is therefore involved in the transformation of sensory information coordinates into action or effector coordinates by updating the spatial representation of the body within the environment. As a result, lesions to the parietal cortex produce deficits in the acquisition and retention of egocentric tasks, whereas minor impairment is seen among allocentric tasks.

Rats with lesions to the anterior region of the posterior parietal cortex reexplore displaced objects, while rats with lesions to the posterior region of the posterior parietal cortex displayed no reaction to spatial change.

Parietal cortex lesions are also known to produce temporally ungraded retrograde amnesia.

=== Entorhinal cortex ===
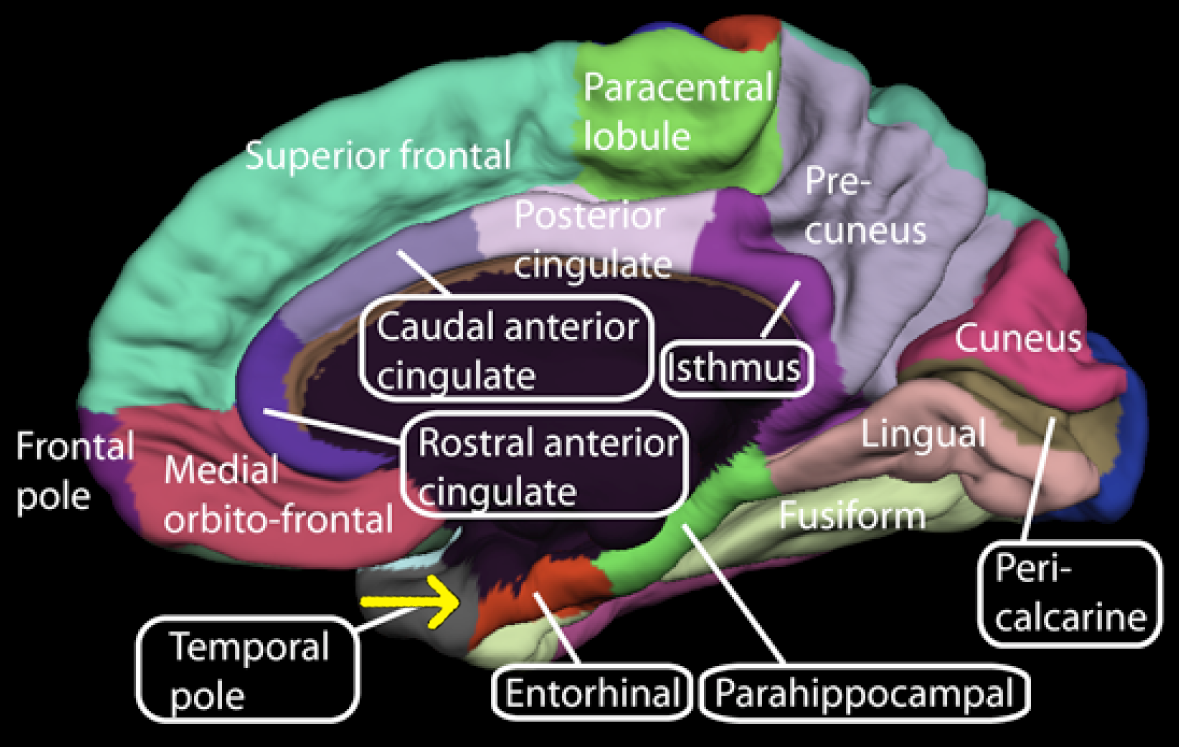
Medial view of the right cerebral hemisphere showing the entorhinal cortex in red at the base of the temporal lobe

The dorsalcaudal medial entorhinal cortex (dMEC) contains a topographically organized map of the spatial environment made up of grid cells. This brain region thus transforms sensory input from the environment and stores it as a durable allocentric representation in the brain to be used for path integration.

The entorhinal cortex contributes to the processing and integration of geometric properties and information in the environment. Lesions to this region impair the use of distal but not proximal landmarks during navigation and produces a delay-dependent deficit in spatial memory that is proportional to the length of the delay. Lesions to this region are also known to create retention deficits for tasks learned up to 4 weeks but not 6 weeks prior to the lesions.

Memory consolidation in the entorhinal cortex is achieved through extracellular signal-regulated kinase activity.

=== Prefrontal cortex ===
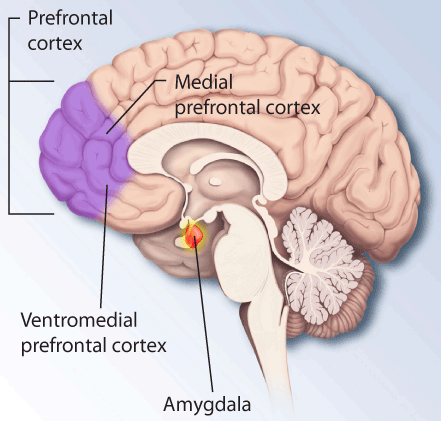
Medial view of the cerebral hemisphere showing the location of the prefrontal cortex and more specifically the medial and ventromedial prefrontal cortex in purple

The medial prefrontal cortex processes egocentric spatial information. It participates in the processing of short-term spatial memory used to guide planned search behavior and is believed to join spatial information with its motivational significance. The identification of neurons that anticipate expected rewards in a spatial task support this hypothesis. The medial prefrontal cortex is also implicated in the temporal organization of information.

Hemisphere specialization is found in this brain region. The left prefrontal cortex preferentially processes categorical spatial memory including source memory (reference to spatial relationships between a place or event), while the right prefrontal cortex preferentially processes coordinate spatial memory including item memory (reference to spatial relationships between features of an item).

Lesions to the medial prefrontal cortex impair the performance of rats on a previously trained radial arm maze, but rats can gradually improve to the level of the controls as a function of experience. Lesions to this area also cause deficits on delayed nonmatching-to-positions tasks and impairments in the acquisition of spatial memory tasks during training trials.

=== Retrosplenial cortex ===
The retrosplenial cortex is involved in the processing of allocentric memory and geometric properties in the environment. Inactivation of this region accounts for impaired navigation in the dark and it may be involved in the process of path integration.

Lesions to the retrosplenial cortex consistently impair tests of allocentric memory, while sparing egocentric memory. Animals with lesions to the caudal retrosplenial cortex show impaired performance on a radial arm maze only when the maze is rotated to remove their reliance on intramaze cues.

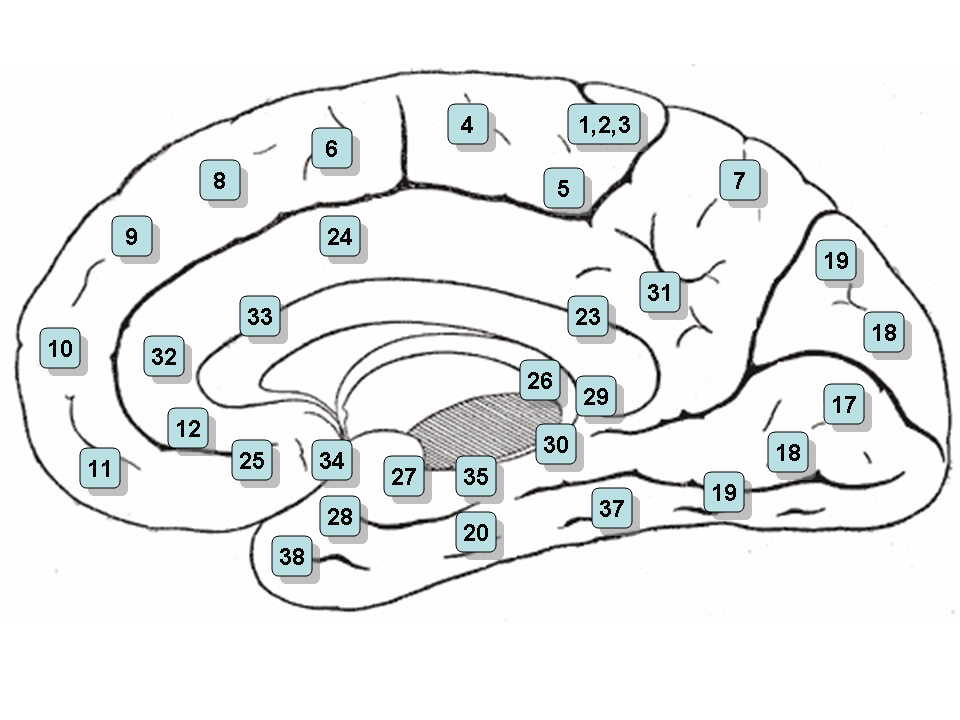
Medial view of the cerebral hemisphere. The retrosplenial cortex encompasses Brodmann areas 26, 29, and 30. The perirhinal cortex contains Brodmann area 35 and 36 (not shown)

In humans, damage to the retrosplenial cortex results in topographical disorientation. Most cases involve damage to the right retrosplenial cortex and include Brodmann area 30. Patients are often impaired at learning new routes and at navigating through familiar environments. However, most patients usually recover within 8 weeks.

The retrosplenial cortex preferentially processes spatial information in the right hemisphere.

=== Perirhinal cortex ===
The perirhinal cortex is associated with both spatial reference and spatial working memory. It processes relational information of environmental cues and locations.

Lesions in the perirhinal cortex account for deficits in reference memory and working memory, and increase the rate of forgetting of information during training trials of the Morris water maze. This accounts for the impairment in the initial acquisition of the task. Lesions also cause impairment on an object location task and reduce habituation to a novel environment.

== Neuroplasticity ==
Spatial memories are formed after an animal gathers and processes sensory information about its surroundings (especially vision and proprioception). In general, mammals require a functioning hippocampus (particularly area CA1) in order to form and process memories about space. There is some evidence that human spatial memory is strongly tied to the right hemisphere of the brain.

Spatial learning requires both NMDA and AMPA receptors, consolidation requires NMDA receptors, and the retrieval of spatial memories requires AMPA receptors. In rodents, spatial memory has been shown to covary with the size of a part of the hippocampal mossy fiber projection.

The function of NMDA receptors varies according to the subregion of the hippocampus. NMDA receptors are required in the CA3 of the hippocampus when spatial information needs to be reorganized, while NMDA receptors in the CA1 are required in the acquisition and retrieval of memory after a delay, as well as in the formation of CA1 place fields. Blockade of the NMDA receptors prevents induction of long-term potentiation and impairs spatial learning.

The CA3 of the hippocampus plays an especially important role in the encoding and retrieval of spatial memories. The CA3 is innervated by two afferent paths known as the perforant path (PPCA3) and the dentate gyrus (DG)-mediated mossy fibers (MFs). The first path is regarded as the retrieval index path while the second is concerned with encoding.

== Disorders/deficits ==
=== Topographical disorientation ===
Topographical disorientation (TD) is a cognitive disorder that results in the individual being unable to orient his or herself in the real or virtual environment. Patients also struggle with spatial-information dependent tasks. These problems could possibly be the result of a disruption in the ability to access one's cognitive map, a mental representation of the surrounding environment or the inability to judge objects' location in relation to one's self.

Developmental topographical disorientation (DTD) is diagnosed when patients have shown an inability to navigate even familiar surroundings since birth and show no apparent neurological causes for this deficiency such as lesioning or brain damage. DTD is a relatively new disorder and can occur in varying degrees of severity.

A study was done to see if topographical disorientation had an effect on individuals who had mild cognitive impairment (MCI). The study was done by recruiting forty-one patients diagnosed with MCI and 24 healthy control individuals. The standards that were set for this experiment were:

1. Subjective cognitive complaint by the patient or his/her caregiver.
2. Normal general cognitive function above the 16th percentile on the Korean version of the Mini-Mental State Examination (K-MMSE).
3. Normal activities of daily living (ADL) assessed both clinically and on a standardized scale (as described below).
4. Objective cognitive decline below the 16th percentile on neuropsychological tests.
5. Exclusion of dementia.

TD was assessed clinically in all participants. Neurological and neuropsychological evaluations were determined by a magnetic imaging scan which was performed on each participant. Voxel-based morphometry was used to compare patterns of gray-matter atrophy between patients with and without TD, and a group of normal controls. The outcome of the experiment was that they found TD in 17 out of the 41 MCI patients (41.4%). The functional abilities were significantly impaired in MCI patients with TD compared to in MCI patients without TD and that the presence of TD in MCI patients is associated with loss of gray matter in the medial temporal regions, including the hippocampus.

=== Hippocampal damage and schizophrenia ===
Research with rats indicates that spatial memory may be adversely affected by neonatal damage to the hippocampus in a way that closely resembles schizophrenia. Schizophrenia is thought to stem from neurodevelopmental problems shortly after birth.

Rats are commonly used as models of schizophrenia patients. Experimenters create lesions in the ventral hippocampal area shortly after birth, a procedure known as neonatal ventral hippocampal lesioning (NVHL). Adult rats with NVHL show typical indicators of schizophrenia, such as hypersensitivity to psychostimulants, reduced social interactions and impaired prepulse inhibition, working memory and set-shifting. Similar to schizophrenia, impaired rats fail to use environmental context in spatial learning tasks such as showing difficulty completing the radial arm maze and the Moris water maze.

=== NEIL1 ===
Endonuclease VIII-like 1 (NEIL1) is a DNA repair enzyme that is widely expressed throughout the brain. NEIL1 is a DNA glycosylase that initiates the first step in base excision repair by cleaving bases damaged by reactive oxygen species and then introducing a DNA strand break via an associated lyase reaction. This enzyme recognizes and removes oxidized DNA bases including formamidopyrimidine, thymine glycol, 5-hydroxyuracil and 5-hydroxycytosine. NEIL1 promotes short-term spatial memory retention. Mice lacking NEIL1 have impaired short-term spatial memory retention in a water maze test.

== GPS use and spatial cognition ==
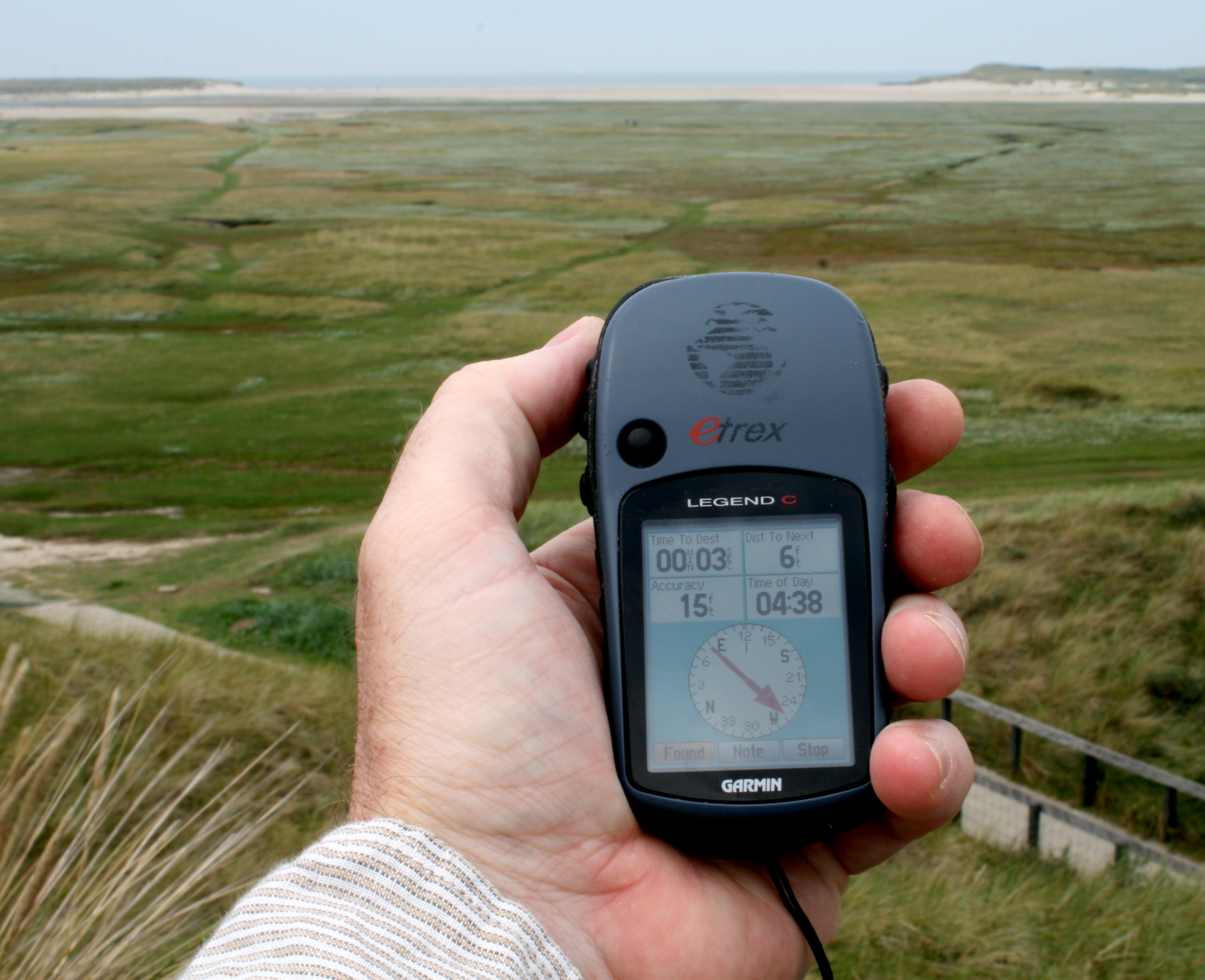
Example of a hand held GPS

Global Positioning System (GPS) technology has revolutionized the way people navigate and explore the environment. GPS has become an essential tool in daily life, providing real-time information about location and the directions needed to take to reach a destination. However, some researchers have raised concerns about the impact of GPS use on spatial learning and memory.

Spatial learning refers to the ability to perceive, remember, and use spatial information acquired in the environment. Memory, on the other hand, involves the ability to store and retrieve information about the world around oneself. Both spatial learning and memory are crucial in order to navigate and explore the environment effectively.

The use of GPS has been shown to have both positive and negative effects on spatial learning and memory. Research has shown that people who rely on GPS for navigation are less likely to develop and use mental maps and have a harder time remembering details about the environment, as GPS use can lead to a decline in those skills over time. Furthermore, GPS users tend to rely more on the technology than on their own cognitive abilities, leading to a loss of confidence in their navigational skills.

However, this loss in confidence in one's own skills is counteracted by the knowledge that getting lost is no longer a problem, due to GPS features on phones, which in turn restores confidence in one's wayfinding ability. Some beneficial outcomes attributed to GPS assistance are more efficient and accurate navigation, coupled with a significant reduction in the cognitive load required for navigation. When people use GPS devices, they do not have to worry about remembering the route, paying attention to landmarks, or constantly checking maps. This can free up cognitive resources for other tasks such as information processing and learning, leading to better performance on such tasks and higher levels of concentration and focus.

To compensate for the issues arising from GPS use, there has been substantial research proposing alternative forms of GPS navigation or additions to existing forms that have been shown to enhance spatial learning. A study from 2021 implemented a 3D spatial audio system similar to an auditory compass, where users are directed towards their destination without explicit directions. Rather than being led passively through verbal directions, users are encouraged to take an active role in their own spatial navigation. This led to more accurate cognitive maps of space, an improvement which was demonstrated when the participants of the study drew precise maps after performing a scavenger hunt task. Another study suggested highlighting local features like landmarks, along the route and at decision points; or highlighting structural features that provide global orientation (not the details concerning the route taken by the study's participants, but landmarks of the larger area surrounding it). The study showed that accentuating local features in wayfinding maps (GPS) supports the acquisition of route knowledge, which was measured with a pointing and a global feature recall task.

Also, in blind and visually impaired people the use of GPS provide advantages in spatial learning and memory. Blind and visually impaired people often need to obtain information about locations ahead of time and practice along a specific route with the help of a relative, friend or specialized instructor before traveling the route to said destination independently. GPS comes in by offering helpful information therefore allowing them to become more independent and confident with their travel to a specific destination.

Another research paper claims that a GPS can be used for patients suffering from dementia. In a study done in 2014, drivers with mild to very mild Alzheimer's disease (AD) were administered 3 driving trials with different GPS settings (normal, visual-only and audio-only). The participants were required to perform a variety of driving tasks on a driving simulator following the GPS instructions. This study has found that using single, simple auditory instructions with the absence of the visual output of the GPS could potentially help people with mild AD to improve their driving ability and reach their destination, therefore confirming that GPS use does reduce cognitive loads.

Since GPS use would help the patients with wayfinding, it would allow them to stay safe in public, reclaim their sense of self-sufficiency, and discourage wandering. Overall, evidence is strongest regarding the use of GPS technologies to avert harm and promote wellbeing.

The impact of GPS use on spatial learning and memory is not yet fully understood, and further research is needed to explore the long-term effects of GPS use on these cognitive processes.

== Learning difficulties ==
Nonverbal learning disability (NVLD) is characterized by normal verbal abilities but impaired visuospatial abilities. Problem areas for children with nonverbal learning disability include arithmetic, geometry, and science. Impairments in spatial memory are linked to nonverbal learning disorder and other learning difficulties.

Arithmetic word problems involve written text containing a set of data followed by one or more questions and require the use of the four basic arithmetic operations (addition, subtraction, multiplication, or division). Researchers suggest that successful completion of arithmetic word problems involves spatial working memory (involved in building schematic representations) which facilitates the creation of spatial relationships between objects. Creating spatial relationships between objects is an important part of solving word problems because mental operations and transformations are required.

Researchers investigated the role of spatial memory and visual memory in the ability to complete arithmetic word problems. Children in the study completed the Corsi block task (forward and backward series) and a spatial matrix task, as well as a visual memory task called the house recognition test. Poor problem-solvers were impaired on the Corsi block tasks and the spatial matrix task, but performed normally on the house recognition test when compared to normally achieving children. The experiment demonstrated that poor problem solving is related specifically to deficient processing of spatial information.

== Sleep ==
Sleep has been found to benefit spatial memory, by enhancing hippocampal-dependent memory consolidation, elevating different pathways which are responsible for synaptic strength, control plasticity-related gene transcription and protein translation (Dominique Piber, 2021). Hippocampal areas activated in route-learning are reactivated during subsequent sleep (NREM sleep in particular). One study demonstrated that the actual extent of reactivation during sleep correlated with the improvement in route retrieval and therefore memory performance the following day. The study established the idea that sleep enhances the systems-level process of consolidation that consequently enhances/improves behavioral performance. A period of wakefulness has no effect on stabilizing memory traces, in comparison to a period of sleep. Sleep after the first post-training night, i.e., on the second night, does not benefit spatial memory consolidation further. Therefore, sleeping in the first post-training night e.g. after learning a route, is most important.

Further, it has been illustrated that early and late nocturnal sleep have different effects on spatial memory. N3 of the NREM sleep, also referred to as slow wave sleep (SWS), is supposed to have a salient role for the sleep-dependent creation of spatial memory in humans. Particularly in the study conducted by Plihal and Born (1999), the performance on mental rotation tasks was higher among participants who had early sleep intervals (23.00–02.00 am) after learning the task compared to the ones who had late sleep intervals (03.00–06.00 am). These results suggest that early sleep, which is rich in SWS, has certain benefits for the formation of spatial memory. When researchers examined whether early sleep would have such an impact on word stem priming task (verbal task), the results were the opposite. This was not surprising for researchers as priming tasks mostly rely on procedural memory, and thus, it benefits more late retention sleep (dominated by REM sleep) rather than early.

Sleep deprivation and sleep has also been a researched association. Sleep deprivation hinders memory performance improvement due to an active disruption of spatial memory consolidation. As a result, spatial memory is enhanced by a period of sleep. Similar results were confirmed by another study examining the impact of total sleep deprivation (TSD) on rats' spatial memory (Guan et al., 2004). In the first experiment conducted, the rats were trained in Morris water maze for 12 trials in 6 hours to find a hidden platform (transparent and not visible in the water) by using spatial cues in the environment. In each trial, they started from a different point and were allowed to swim for a maximum of 120 s to reach the platform. After the learning phase, they gave a probe trial to test spatial memory (after 24 h). In this trial, the hidden platform was removed from the maze and the time animals spent in the target area (which was occupied by hidden platform before) was a measure of spatial memory persistence. The control rats, who had spontaneous sleep, spent significantly more time in the target quadrant compared to ones who had total sleep deprivation. In terms of spatial learning, which is indicated by the latency to find the hidden platform, there were no differences. For both control and sleep deprived rats, the time required to find a platform was decreasing with every new trial.

In the second experiment, the rats were trained to swim to a visible platform whose location was changed in each trial. For every new trial, the rats started from the opposite side of the platform. After the training in a single trial, their memory was tested after 24 h. Platform was still in the maze. The distance and the time they needed to swim to the visible platform were considered as non-spatial memory measures. No significant difference has been found between sleep deprived rats and control rats. Similarly, in terms of spatial learning, which is indicated by latency to reach the visible platform, there were no significant differences. TSD does not affect non-spatial learning and non-spatial memory.

In reference to the effects of sleep deprivation on humans, Dominique Piber (2021) featured in his literature review the clinical observations which shows that people with severe sleep disorders frequently have abnormalities in spatial memory. As visible in the studies of both, insomnia patients who suffer from a sleep disorder which features interrupted, non-restorative sleep and deficits in cognitive performance during the day, are documented to have a negative performance in a spatial task, in comparison with the healthy participants (Li et al., 2016; Chen et al., 2016; Khassawneh et al., 2018; He et al., 2021).

Likewise, dreaming has an important role in spatial memory. A study conducted by Wamsley and Stickgold (2019) proved that participants, who incorporate a recent learning experience into their overnight dream content, show an increased overnight performance improvement. Thus, supporting the hypothesis that dreaming reflects memory processing in the sleeping brain. Moreover, according to the authors, one of the explanations is that maze‐related dreams are indicators that performance‐relevant components of task memory are being reactivated in the sleeping brain. Additionally, the study supports the idea that dream reports can include an experimental learning task during all stages of sleep, including REM and NREM.

Virtual reality (VR) has also been used to study the connection between dreams and spatial memory. Ribeiro, Gounden, and Quaglino (2021) proposed spatialized elements in a VR context and found that after a full night of sleep in a home setting, when the material studied was incorporated into the dream content, the recall performance of these elements was better than the performance obtained after a comparable wake period.

== See also ==
- Animal cognition
  - Memory
  - Spatial cognition
- Cognitive map
- Dissociation (neuropsychology)
- Method of loci
- Spatial ability
- Space mapping
- Visual memory
