= Labyrinth (disambiguation) =

The Labyrinth is an elaborate maze in Greek mythology.

Labyrinth, Labyrint, and Labyrinthe may also refer to:

== In art ==
=== Film ===
- Labyrinth (1959 film), a German-Italian drama film
- Labyrinth (1986 film), a fantasy film directed by Jim Henson
- Labyrinth (1991 film), a German-Czech drama film directed by Jaromil Jireš
- Labyrinth (2002 film), a Serbian film
- Labyrinth (2026 film), a Japanese anime film
- City of Lies, originally titled LAbyrinth, a 2018 American biographical crime thriller film directed by Brad Furman

=== Television ===
- Labyrinth (opera), a 1963 television opera by Gian Carlo Menotti
- Labyrint (Swedish TV series), a 2007 Swedish drama television series
- Labyrinth (miniseries), a 2012 TV miniseries based on the Kate Mosse novel
- Labyrint (Czech TV series), a 2015 Czech crime TV series
- "The Labyrinth", an episode of The Wind in the Willows

=== Games ===
- Labyrinth (card game), a patience or card solitaire game
- Labyrinth (marble game), involving guiding a marble through a maze
- Labyrinth (board game), with shifting pieces forming a constantly changing maze
- Labyrinth (paper-and-pencil game), a logical paper-and-pencil game
- Labyrinth (1980 video game), for the TRS-80
- Labyrinth (1984 video game), for the BBC Micro
- Labyrinth: The Computer Game, based on the 1986 film
  - Labyrinth: Maō no Meikyū (Maze of the Goblin King), a Japanese exclusive video game also based on the 1986 film (see article above)
- Labyrinth: The War on Terror, 2001 – ?, a board game by Volko Ruhnke

=== Literature ===
- Labyrinth (novel), a 2005 archaeological mystery novel by Kate Mosse
- "Labyrinth" (novella), a novella in the Vorkosigan Saga by Lois McMaster Bujold
- Labyrinths (short story collection), a 1962 collection of short stories and essays by Jorge Luis Borges
- The Labyrinth, a memoir by Walter Schellenberg

=== Music ===
- Labyrinth (band), an Italian power metal band
- Labyrint (band), a Swedish hip hop band
- The Labyrinth (tour), 2010, by Leona Lewis

==== Albums ====
- Labyrinth (Blutengel album), 2007
- Labyrinth (1986 soundtrack), soundtrack to the 1986 film Labyrinth
- Labyrinth (Equinox album), 1994
- Labyrinth (Juno Reactor album), 2004
- Labyrinth (Labyrinth album), 2003
- Labyrinth (Fleshgod Apocalypse album), 2013
- Labyrinths (Marilyn Crispell album), 1988
- Labyrinthes, the third studio album by Malajube, 2009
- Labyrinth (EP), the eighth EP by GFriend, 2020
- Labyrinth, Nucleus, 1973

==== Songs ====
- "Labyrinth" (Cryalot song), 2022
- "Labyrinth" (Taylor Swift song), 2022
- "Labyrinth", a song by Crown the Empire from the album Dogma, 2023
- "Labyrinth", a song by The Cure from The Cure, 2004
- "Labyrinth", a song by Enter Shikari from the album Take to the Skies, 2007
- "Labyrinth", a song by GFriend on the EP Labyrinth, 2020
- "Labyrinth", a song by Haste the Day from the album Dreamer, 2008
- "Labyrinths", a song by Savatage from the album Edge of Thorns, 1993
- "The Labyrinth" ("Il labirinto armonico"), a concerto by Pietro Locatelli
- "Labyrinth", a song by Elisa from the album Pipes & Flowers
- "Labyrinth", a song by ミラクルミュージカル from Hawaii: Part II, 2012

=== Other uses in art ===
- Labyrinth (artwork), a 2013 series of artworks by Mark Wallinger
- Labyrinth (Miró), the set of sculptures and ceramics by the artist Joan Miró
- Labyrinth, a ballet by Tim Rushton

== Places ==
- Labyrinth (Antarctica), an extensive flat area in Wright Valley, Victoria Land
- Labyrinth Bay, Nunavut, Canada
- Labyrinth of Egypt, archaeological site first recorded by ancient Greek scholars

== Science and technology ==
- Bony labyrinth, part of the human ear
- Labyrinth fish, of suborder Anabantoidei, and the labyrinth organ, a defining characteristic
- Labyrinth seal, a type of mechanical seal

== Other uses ==
- Labyrinth Gallery, an art gallery in Lublin, Poland

== See also ==
- El laberinto (disambiguation)
- Labrinth (born 1989), English musician
- Labrynth (club), a 1990s club based in London
- Éditions du Labyrinthe, a French right-wing publisher officially known as Groupement de recherche et d'études pour la civilisation européenne
