= Dolichopoda paraskevi =

Conservation status
- Least Concern (IUCN 3.1)

Scientific classification
- Kingdom: Animalia
- Phylum: Arthropoda
- Clade: Pancrustacea
- Class: Insecta
- Order: Orthoptera
- Suborder: Ensifera
- Family: Rhaphidophoridae
- Genus: Dolichopoda
- Species: D. paraskevi

Binomial name
- Dolichopoda paraskevi Boudou-Saltet, 1973

Species of insect

Dolichopoda paraskevi, the Cretan cave-cricket, is a species of cave cricket within the family Rhaphidophoridae. It endemic to Crete, where it is known to inhabit 4 caves on the eastern side of the island. The type locality of the species was collected in the Skotino Cave.

Dolichopoda paraskevi currently has no conservation efforts put in place, although it does occur on at least 1 protected area. There are no known threats to the species, although the caves it lives in, which are relatively undisturbed, can be accessed by tourists which could post a threat to the species. It has been assessed as 'Near threatened' by the IUCN Red List because of this, though this has improved to 'Least concern' on the most recent assessment carried out on 4 September 2023.
