= Labyrinth walking =

Form of active meditation

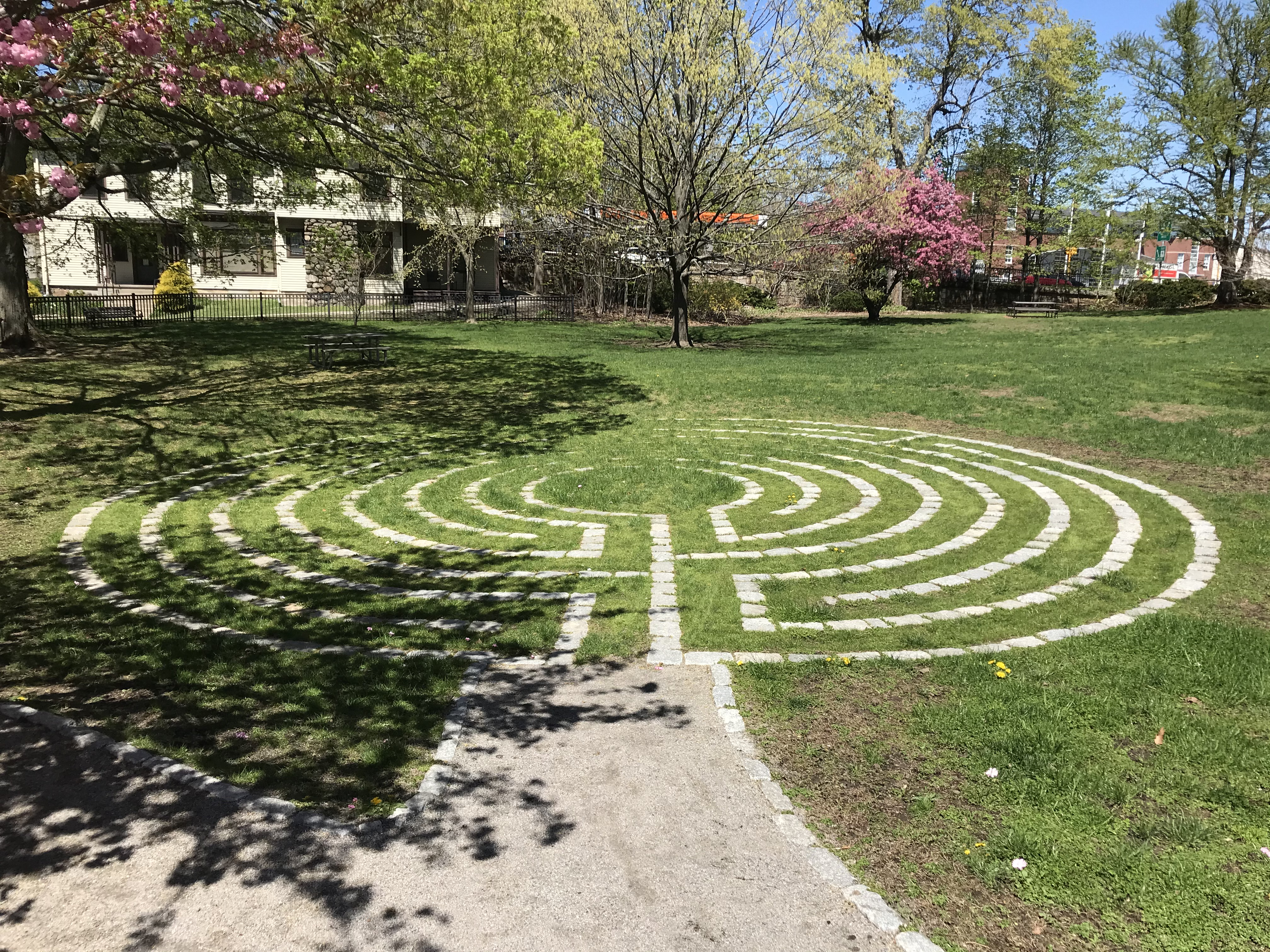
A labyrinth at the Unitarian Universalist Society of Wellesley Hills, Massachusetts

Labyrinth walking is a form of active meditation in which one navigates a labyrinth for meditative or therapeutic purposes. Labyrinths for this purpose typically differ from general mazes (which are built to confuse the walker) by providing a safe and partly contained environment for people to walk through as they pray or meditate. Such labyrinths have only one path to follow, which removes the conflict of decision from the journey itself, allowing the walker to focus on their mental activity while engaging in mild physical activity. The modern revival of labyrinth walking as an activity in the United States is largely led by Christian religious leaders and medical therapists.

== Process ==
Labyrinth walking has mental and physical components, although the specifics of the practice vary from person to person. The unicursal structure of the labyrinth determines the physical process of labyrinth walking, as there is only one path to enter and exit. The practice typically involves walking along the path to the center, pausing in the center, and returning along the path to exit the labyrinth. (Some labyrinths have a separate exit path, either a short one for convenience, or a longer one typically reflecting the entrance path for symmetry.) Variations of walking include walking on one's knees, walking backwards, dancing, and using a wheelchair or other assistance.

There are no prescribed mental restrictions for labyrinth walking, as it is a personal practice. However, the religious practice commonly includes prayer, and secular practice commonly involves mindfulness and personal reflection. Mantra-based meditation can also be used throughout the walk.

== Christian significance ==
The earliest known labyrinth built by Christians was constructed in modern-day Orleansville, Algeria, in the 4th-century basilica of Repartus. Its dimensions and placement near the church's entrance have led to conjecture that it was walked for ritualistic purposes, while the text "Sancta Eclesia" inscribed at its center confirms that it was connected to Christian practice. It is sometimes asserted by Christian organizations that walking medieval-era Christian labyrinths, such as the Chartres Labyrinth, was an alternative to holy pilgrimage. The center of the labyrinth could have been used to represent Jerusalem, while the twisting path represented the pilgrimage itself. The crusades and the bubonic plague are cited as specific reasons an alternative to pilgrimage may have become necessary in the middle ages. These hypotheses have been accused of relying on circular logic and challenged for their lack of direct evidence, arguing that there is no proof that walking these labyrinths was a significant practice.

== Modern revival ==
The construction and use of labyrinths as tools for healing and religious practice has been witnessing a revival, led in part by Reverend Dr. Lauren Artress. Artress founded the nonprofit organization Veriditas in the 1990s with the mission of facilitating the introduction of labyrinths to be used for personal and communal healing. Labyrinths have recently been built in hospitals to be used for physical and psychiatric care, such as their introduction at Kaiser Permanente hospitals and campuses since 2007. Two other settings that have seen implementation of labyrinth walking are correctional facilities and libraries. Preliminary studies on the effects of labyrinth walking for inmates suggests that the activity assists with stress management, and similar studies of academic library patrons have suggested that labyrinth walking increases satisfaction and lowers blood pressure.
