= Dolichopoda araneiformis =

Conservation status
- Least Concern (IUCN 3.1)

Scientific classification
- Kingdom: Animalia
- Phylum: Arthropoda
- Class: Insecta
- Order: Orthoptera
- Suborder: Ensifera
- Family: Rhaphidophoridae
- Genus: Dolichopoda
- Species: D. araneiformis

Binomial name
- Dolichopoda araneiformis Burmeister, 1838

Species of insect

Dolichopoda araneiformis, the spidery cave-cricket, is a cave-cricket found in Balkans.

== Distribution ==
This species is endemic to Bosnia and Hercegovina, Croatia and Montenegro.
