= Dolichopoda dalensi =

Conservation status
- Vulnerable (IUCN 3.1)

Scientific classification
- Kingdom: Animalia
- Phylum: Arthropoda
- Clade: Pancrustacea
- Class: Insecta
- Order: Orthoptera
- Suborder: Ensifera
- Family: Rhaphidophoridae
- Genus: Dolichopoda
- Species: D. dalensi

Binomial name
- Dolichopoda dalensi Boudou-Saltet, 1972

Species of cave cricket

Dolichopoda dalensi, the Kefalari cave cricket or Kefalari cave-cricket, is a species of cave cricket. First formally described in 1972, it is endemic to Greece.

== Taxonomy ==
The species was first described from a female specimen by Boudou-Saltet in 1972. The male was not described until 2008. The type locality is Kephalovrissi cave.

== Description ==
The males are between 21 and 22.5 millimeters long. They are colored yellowish-brown with a lighter underside. On the upper surfaces of the thorax and abdomen, the posterior edges are darker. On the seventh, eighth, and ninth tergites, these edges have a convex center and bend backwards. The tenth tergite has 2 lobes (the shape of which has been characterized as either "partially-square" or "trapezoidal"), one on each side, with meandering anterior edges. Also on the tenth tergite is a pair of pyramidal tubercles with inward-curving apexes. The legs are especially long, colored dull orange, and have slender femora.

The females are 19 mm long. The ovipositor is 19 mm long and is large at the base. It curves along the whole length, and has 16 denticles in the inner valves.

== Habitat and distribution ==
Dolichopoda dalensi has only been found in a cave in Argolis, Greece.

== Conservation ==
The IUCN lists Dolichopoda dalensi as vulnerable due to its tightly restricted geographic range. In the near future, the species could become critically endangered or extinct as a result of human activity. The entrances to the cave are used for various purposes, but it is unknown how this affects the population (or if it affects it at all).
