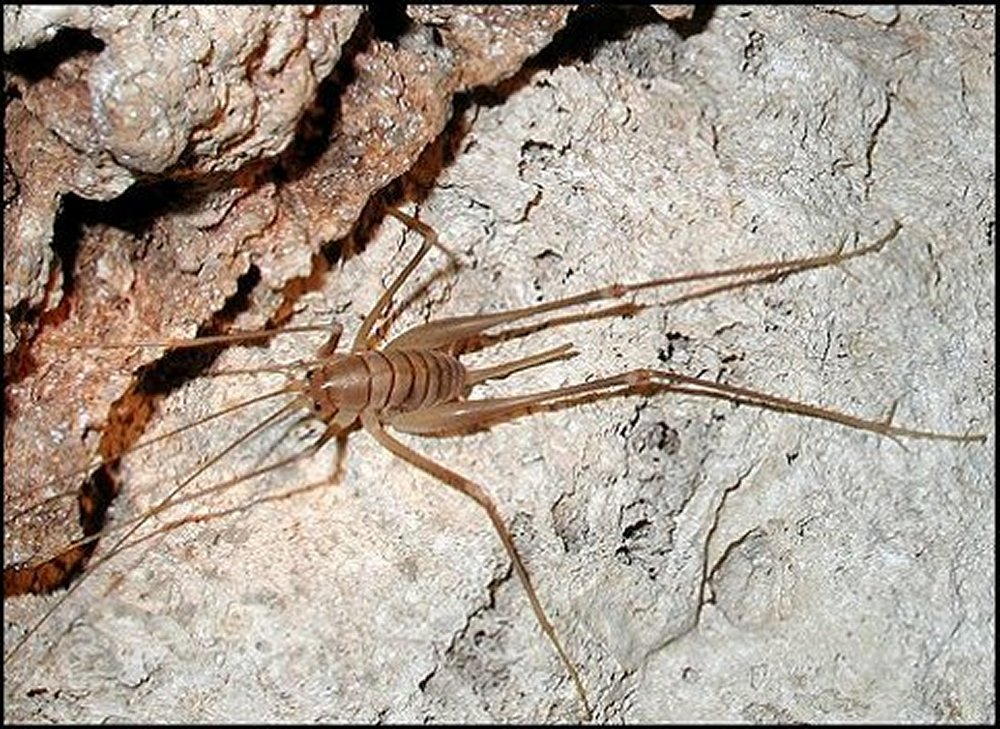
- Dolichopoda linderi female

Scientific classification
- Kingdom: Animalia
- Phylum: Arthropoda
- Clade: Pancrustacea
- Class: Insecta
- Order: Orthoptera
- Suborder: Ensifera
- Family: Rhaphidophoridae
- Subfamily: Dolichopodainae; Brunner von Wattenwyl, 1888
- Tribe: Dolichopodaini; Brunner von Wattenwyl, 1888
- Genus: Dolichopoda; Bolívar, 1880

Type species
- Gryllus palpata Sulzer, 1776

= Dolichopoda =

Genus of cricket-like animals

Dolichopoda is a genus of cave crickets in the monotypic tribe Dolichopodaini, subfamily Dolichopodainae. They are distributed in the Mediterranean basin in southern Europe and western Asia.

The type species of the genus is Gryllus palpata, now known as Dolichopoda palpata.

== Species ==
There are over 50 described species. The greatest species diversity occurs in Greece. Four subgenera have been named, though some have been shown to be paraphyletic (Dolichopoda) or polyphyletic (Chopardina).

Dolichopoda (Capraiacris) Baccetti, 1977

These two species lack spines on both the anterior tibiae and the hind femur.

- Dolichopoda aegilion Baccetti, 1977
- Dolichopoda baccettii Capra, 1957

Dolichopoda (Chopardina) Uvarov, 1921

Found in Italy, Corsica, and Greece. Distinguished from other subgenera by having several spines on the hind femurs.

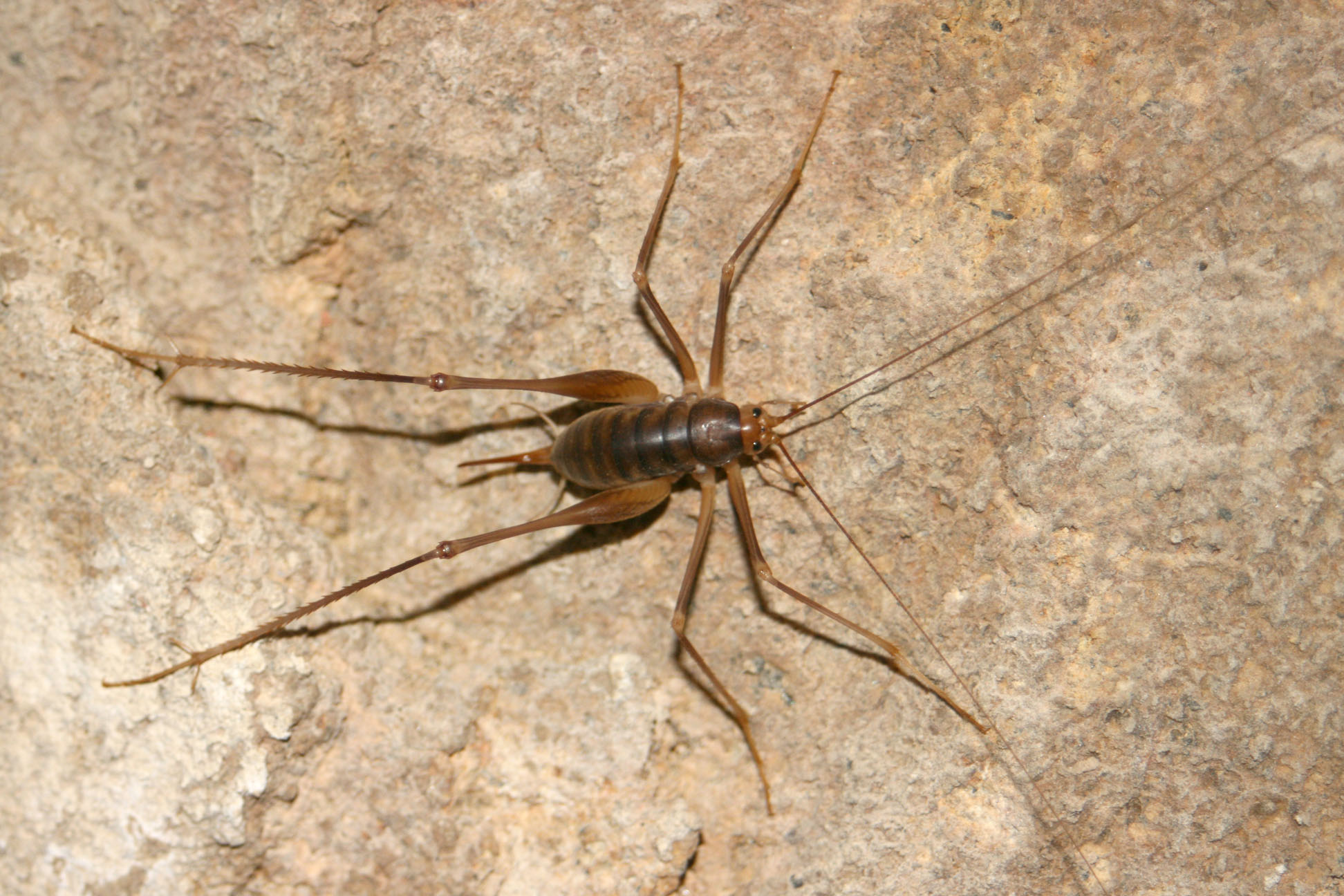
Dolichopoda schiavazzii

- Dolichopoda bormansi Brunner von Wattenwyl, 1882
- Dolichopoda cyrnensis Chopard, 1950
- Dolichopoda lustriae Rampini & Di Russo, 2008
- Dolichopoda muceddai Rampini & Di Russo, 2005
- Dolichopoda remyi Chopard, 1934
- Dolichopoda schiavazzii Capra, 1934

Dolichopoda (Dolichopoda) Bolívar, 1880

The largest subgenus by number of species; distinguished from the other subgenera by the spines on the anterior tibiae.

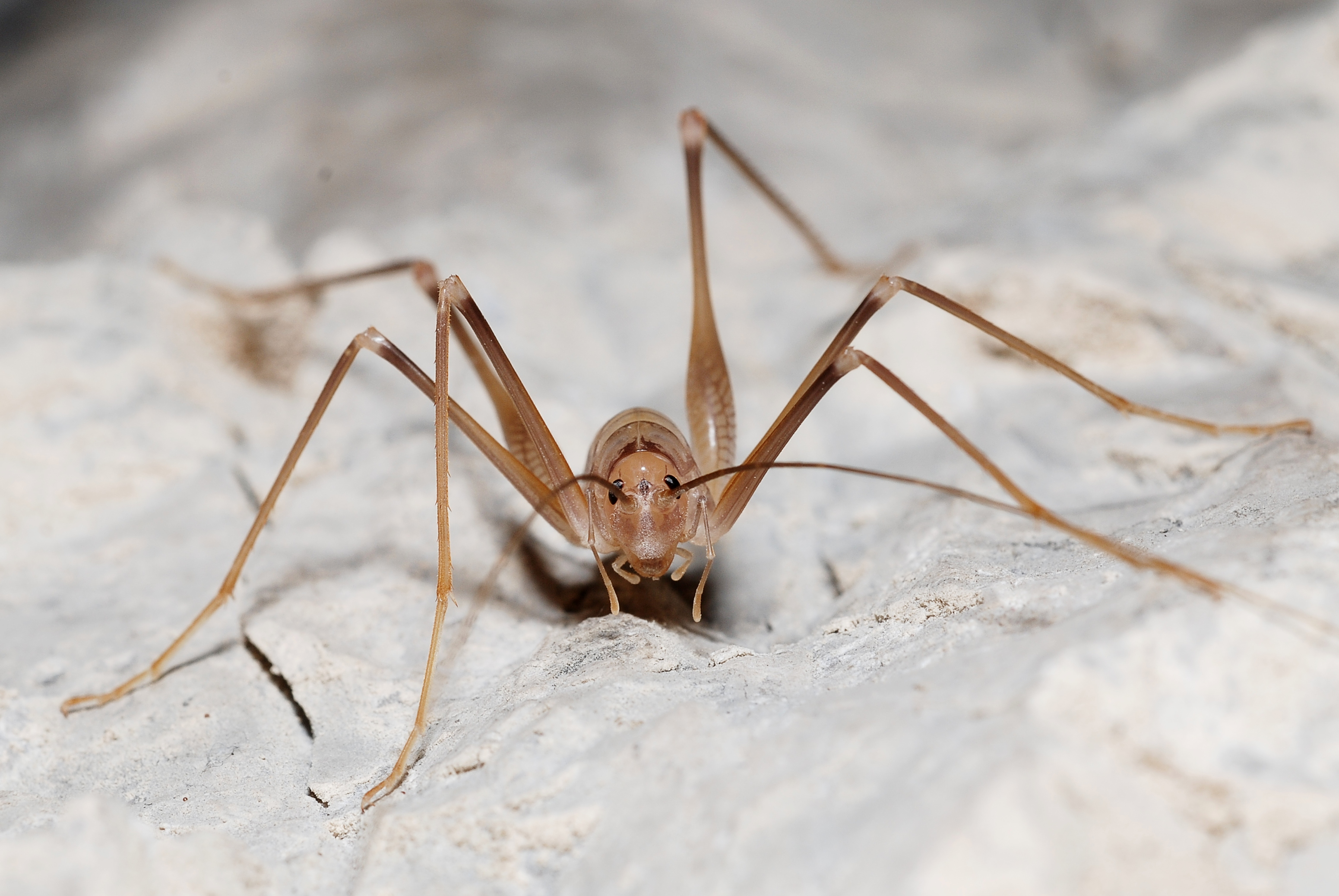
Dolichopoda azami

- Dolichopoda annae Boudou-Saltet, 1973
- Dolichopoda aranea Bolívar, 1899
- Dolichopoda araneiformis Burmeister, 1838
- Dolichopoda azami Saulcy, 1893
- Dolichopoda bakolitsasi Rampini & Di Russo, 2017
- Dolichopoda balrogi Kalaentzis & Alexiou, 2026
- Dolichopoda bolivari Chopard, 1916
- Dolichopoda calidnae Rampini & Di Russo, 2012
- Dolichopoda capreensis Capra, 1968
- Dolichopoda chopardi Baccetti, 1966
- Dolichopoda christosnifoni Di Russo & Rampini, 2018
- Dolichopoda dalensi Boudou-Saltet, 1972
- Dolichopoda euxina Semenov, 1901
- Dolichopoda fortuita Gorochov & Ünal, 2015
- Dolichopoda gasparoi Rampini & Di Russo, 2008
- Dolichopoda geniculata Costa, 1860
- Dolichopoda giachinoi Rampini & Di Russo, 2008
- Dolichopoda giulianae Rampini & Di Russo, 2012
- Dolichopoda graeca Chopard, 1964
- Dolichopoda hussoni Chopard, 1934
- Dolichopoda hyrcana Bey-Bienko, 1969
- Dolichopoda ithakii Rampini & Di Russo, 2008
- Dolichopoda kalithea Di Russo & Rampini, 2012
- Dolichopoda kikladica Di Russo & Rampini, 2018
- Dolichopoda kiriakii Rampini & Di Russo, 2008
- Dolichopoda laetitiae Minozzi, 1920
- Dolichopoda linderii Dufour, 1861
- Dolichopoda lycia Galvagni, 2006
- Dolichopoda margiolis Di Russo & Rampini, 2018
- Dolichopoda matsakisi Boudou-Saltet, 1972
- Dolichopoda naxia Boudou-Saltet, 1973
- Dolichopoda noctivaga Di Russo & Rampini, 2007
- Dolichopoda palpata Sulzer, 1776
- Dolichopoda paraskevi Boudou-Saltet, 1973
- Dolichopoda patrizii Chopard, 1964
- Dolichopoda pavesii Galvagni, 2002
- Dolichopoda pusilla Bolívar, 1899
- Dolichopoda sbordonii Di Russo & Rampini, 2006
- Dolichopoda steriotisi Boudou-Saltet, 1973
- Dolichopoda sutini Rampini & Taylan, 2012
- Dolichopoda thasosensis Chopard, 1964
- Dolichopoda unicolor Chopard, 1964

Dolichopoda (Petrochilosina) Boudou-Saltet, 1980

- Dolichopoda cassagnaui Boudou-Saltet, 1971
- Dolichopoda insignis Chopard, 1955
- Dolichopoda makrykapa Boudou-Saltet, 1980
- Dolichopoda ochtoniai Rampini & Di Russo, 2015
- Dolichopoda petrochilosi Chopard, 1954
- Dolichopoda saraolacosi Rampini & Di Russo, 2015
- Dolichopoda vandeli Boudou-Saltet, 1970
