= Dolichopoda lycia =

Scientific classification
- Domain: Eukaryota
- Kingdom: Animalia
- Phylum: Arthropoda
- Class: Insecta
- Order: Orthoptera
- Suborder: Ensifera
- Family: Rhaphidophoridae
- Genus: Dolichopoda
- Species: D. lycia

Binomial name
- Dolichopoda lycia (Galvagni, 2006)

Synonyms
- Hellerina lycia Galvagni, 2006

Species of insect

Dolichopoda lycia is a species of cave cricket within the family Rhaphidophoridae. The species is found around caves around Antalya, Turkey.
