= Labyrinth (paper-and-pencil game) =

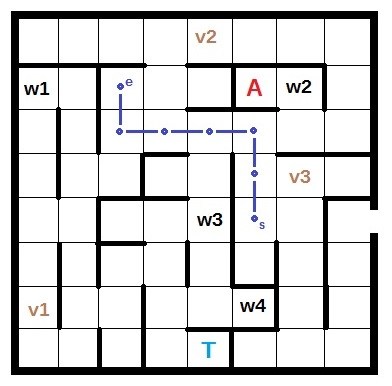
A Labyrinth game map

Labyrinth is a paper-and-pencil game played by three or more participants. One participant (known as the game master or game leader) designs the labyrinth map, sets the game rules, and announces the results of each move. The other players attempt to traverse the labyrinth by uncovering its design and achieving the objective (usually, finding a treasure and exiting the labyrinth with it). The game, created in the Soviet Union during the 1970s, was popular among high school and college students throughout the USSR.

== Overview, objective and structure ==
Labyrinth is played with a minimum of three people, one of whom is the game master. Each participant should have paper (preferably graph paper) and a pen or (preferably) a pencil. Players take turns as the game master, for one game each. Rules are agreed on before beginning a series of games.

The game ends when only one player is left alive, or when one of the players exits the labyrinth with the treasure(s). Each player keeps track of all movements, directives and requests, recreating the labyrinth structure on their notepad.

The square labyrinth's size determines the complexity and length of the game. Sizes range from 4 by 4 inches (100 mm × 100 mm) to 10 by 10 inches (250 mm × 250 mm) or 12 by 12 inches (300 mm × 300 mm). Each cell in the labyrinth may be one of the following:

- Empty
- Wormholes (optional), organized into sets
- River (optional), with source and end: Several cells arranged in a chain which cannot intersect itself
- Hospital (optional)
- Arsenal, some of whose weapons a player may take when entering it
- Treasure: At least one empty cell

A wall can be built between any two neighbouring cells. The outside wall, known as the monolith, must have at least one exit (a space) so players can leave the labyrinth.

== Gameplay ==
The game master creates the labyrinth. They and the players agree on the rules. At the start of the game, the game master sets the number and length of wormhole chains, rivers (if any) and weapon-related parameters such as the number of arsenals and the starting size of a player's weapons kit.

Players take turns. With each turn, a player can move their marker to a neighbouring cell (a cell with a common, non-diagonal border with their current cell). After each move, the game master tells the player whether their move is possible. If it is, they tell the player what type of cell their marker is on: empty, arsenal, river, wormhole, exit, etc. If it is an obstacle, the game master tells the player if it is an ordinary wall or the monolith (labyrinth boundary). If a player shoots, then the game master tells them if another player is wounded or killed. All game-master announcements are made aloud, and players cannot form alliances or exchange information in secret.

After learning the labyrinth parameters, each player secretly tells the game master where they want their marker placed at the beginning of the game; the game master may also place the markers randomly, so the players do not know their initial positions. Each player has a starting arsenal, with a set of weapons.

Players move by making a step in any direction (saying "up", "down", "left" or "right"), or opting to skip a step. They can shoot in any direction before and after making a step, and the bullet travels in the stated direction until it hits a wall or a player. If it hits a player, they are declared wounded (or killed) by the game master. A player can stab by saying, "Use knife". If another player is in the same cell, they will be wounded or killed; the used knife is discarded. Players can blow up a wall in any direction by saying, "Throw grenade left/right/up/down", with the game master announcing the result.

Any combination of weapons use can be used with any type of step request. When a step directive is given, the game master tries to move the marker in the requested direction and announces the result. If a player's marker moves to a wormhole, it automatically moves to the cell with the next wormhole in the chain. If the current position is the last one in the chain, the marker is moved to the chain's first wormhole. If a marker is moved into a river, it is then moved two cells downriver; if one of the cells is the river end, the marker stops there. If the marker is already in the river (but not at the end), the player can skip the step and the marker will flow downriver. If a marker is in the arsenal, the player's starting weapons are restored or they receive an additional set. If a wounded player is in the hospital, their health is restored. A wounded player cannot use weapons or carry treasure. If a player carrying treasure is wounded, the treasure remains in that cell until it is picked up. If the player is wounded in the river, the treasure flows two cells downriver after every move to the river end, where it can be picked up.
