= El laberinto =

El laberinto may refer to:

- El laberinto (novel)
- El laberinto (TV series)

== See also ==
- Laberinto, a music album
- Labyrinth, an elaborate maze in Greek mythology
