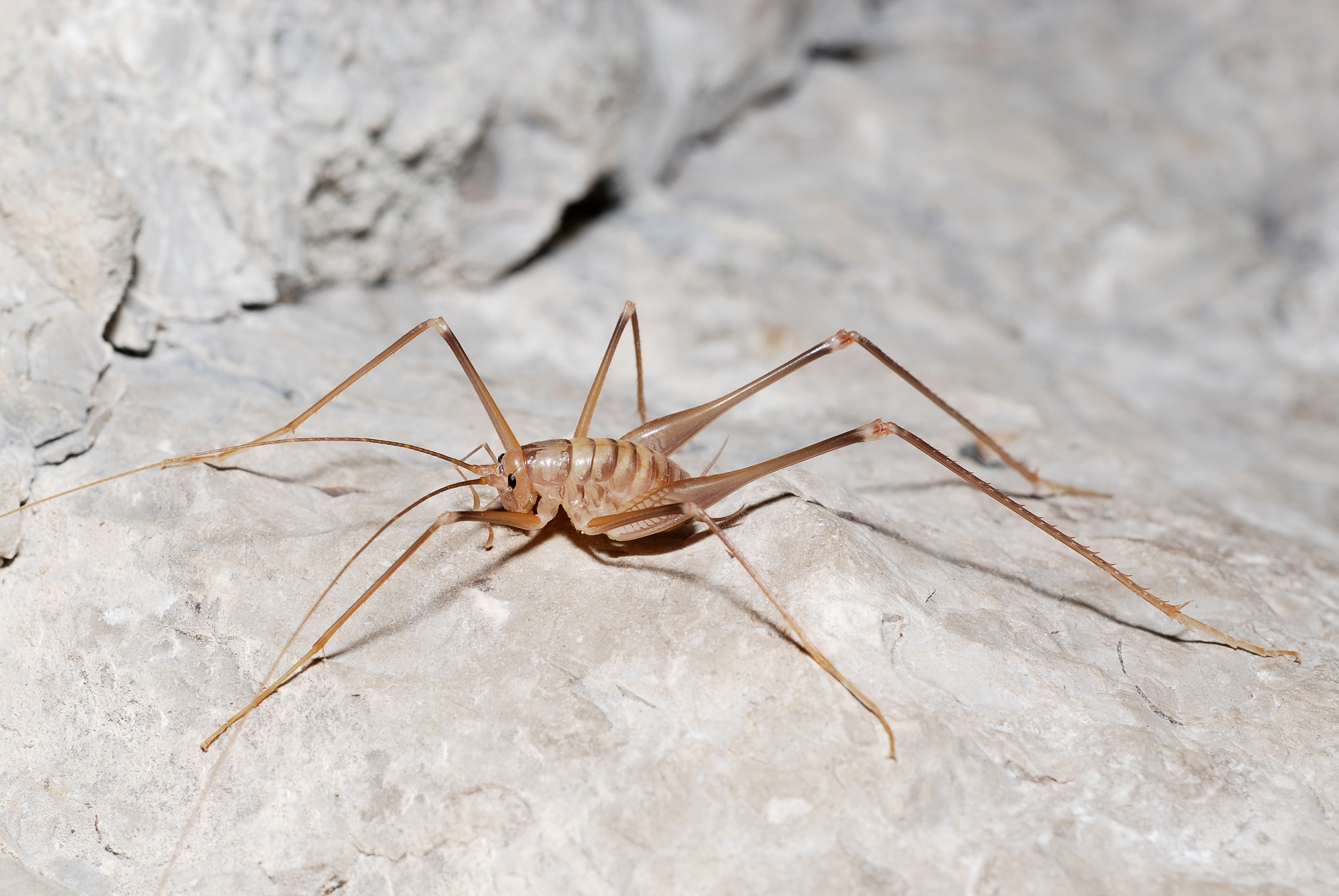

Conservation status
- Least Concern (IUCN 3.1)

Scientific classification
- Kingdom: Animalia
- Phylum: Arthropoda
- Clade: Pancrustacea
- Class: Insecta
- Order: Orthoptera
- Suborder: Ensifera
- Family: Rhaphidophoridae
- Genus: Dolichopoda
- Species: D. azami

Binomial name
- Dolichopoda azami Saulcy, 1893

= Dolichopoda azami =

Species of insect

Dolichopoda azami, the Azam's cave-cricket, is a species of cave cricket within the family Rhaphidophoridae. The species distribution is in France in the Southern Alps and in Italy in Piedmont, Liguria and Lombardia, where it lives in various dark habitats that have stable temperatures and high humidity. Such habitats include rocky forests, caves, damaged bridges or aqueducts, and abandoned/disused buildings at elevations of 120 to 1,940 metres (390 to 6,360 ft). It lives in these habitats during the day and is primarily active at night.

Dolichopoda azami has been assessed as 'Least concern' by the IUCN Red List as it has no known major threats, is common, and occurs in at least 1 protected area. Direct human threats on the species are rare and are believed to not severely impact the species population.

== Subspecies ==
- Dolichopoda azami azami Saulcy, 1893 (Found in southeastern France)
- Dolichopoda azami ligustica Baccetti & Capra, 1959 (Found in southern Piedmont, north-western Liguria, and the French part of Roya valley)
- Dolichopoda azami septentrionalis Baccetti & Capra, 1959 (Found in a small area in Lanzo valley, easternmost caves close to Bergamo, and close to Turin)
