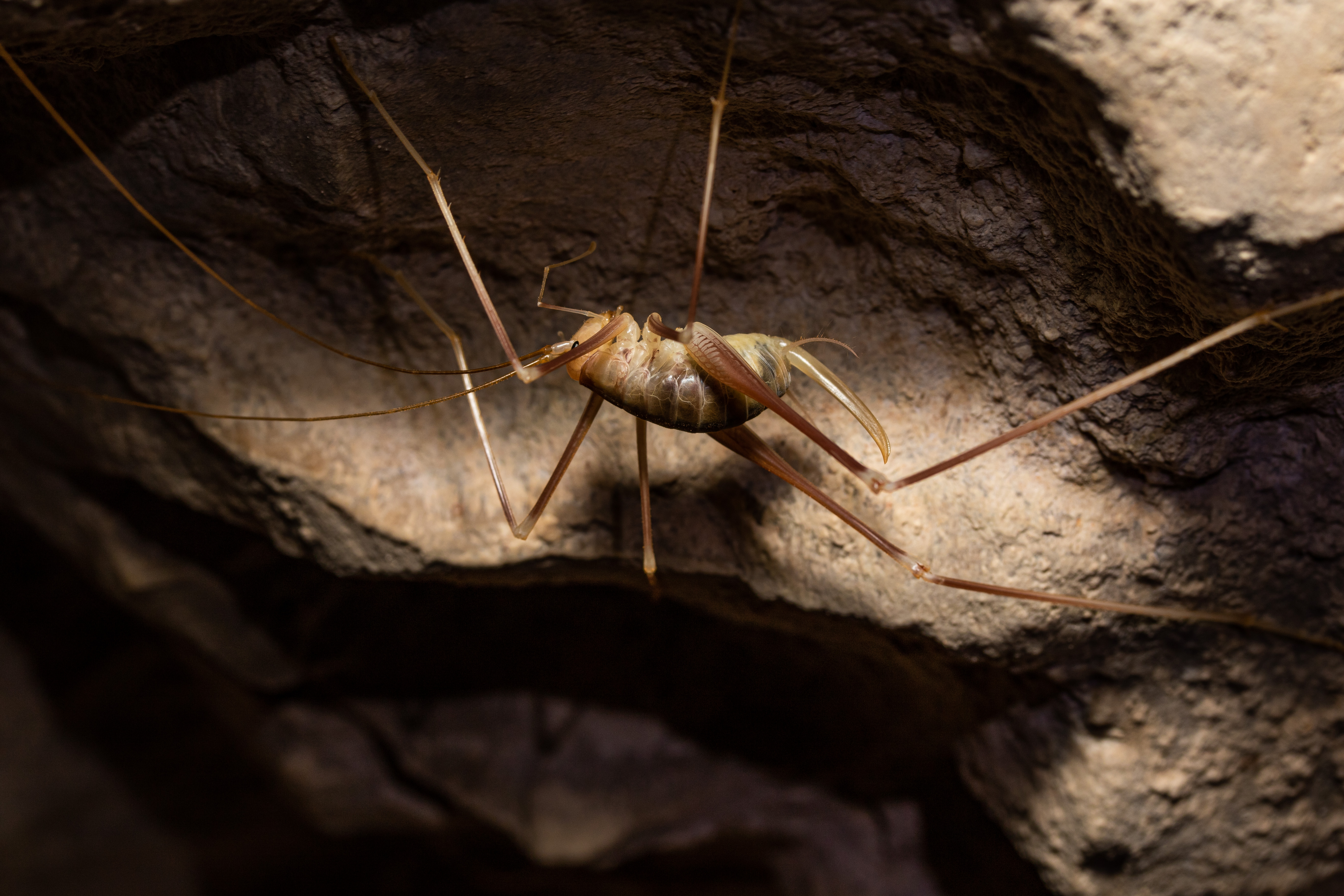
- Adult female of Dolichopoda balrogi

Scientific classification
- Kingdom: Animalia
- Phylum: Arthropoda
- Clade: Pancrustacea
- Class: Insecta
- Order: Orthoptera
- Suborder: Ensifera
- Family: Rhaphidophoridae
- Genus: Dolichopoda
- Species: D. balrogi

Binomial name
- Dolichopoda balrogi Kalaentzis & Alexiou, 2026

= Dolichopoda balrogi =

Species of cave cricket

Dolichopoda balrogi is a species of cave cricket identified in a tunnel in the Greek island of Kastellorizo in 2026. It was formally described as species of the genus Dolichopoda by Greek researchers in a paper published by the Journal of Orthoptera Research based on morphological data and DNA Barcoding.

== Etymology ==
The species was named after the Balrog, the subterranean creature from J. R. R. Tolkien’s The Lord of the Rings. The name refers not only to its dark underground habitat, but also to the circumstances of its discovery: like the Balrog of Moria, the cricket was revealed only after humans excavated deep into the rock and created the tunnel in which it was found.

== Distribution ==
Dolichopoda balrogi is known only from its type locality, a man-made tunnel on the island of Kastellorizo, in the Kastellorizo archipelago in Eastern Mediterranean, Greece. The species has not been recorded from natural caves or from any other locality and is therefore currently considered endemic to Kastellorizo.

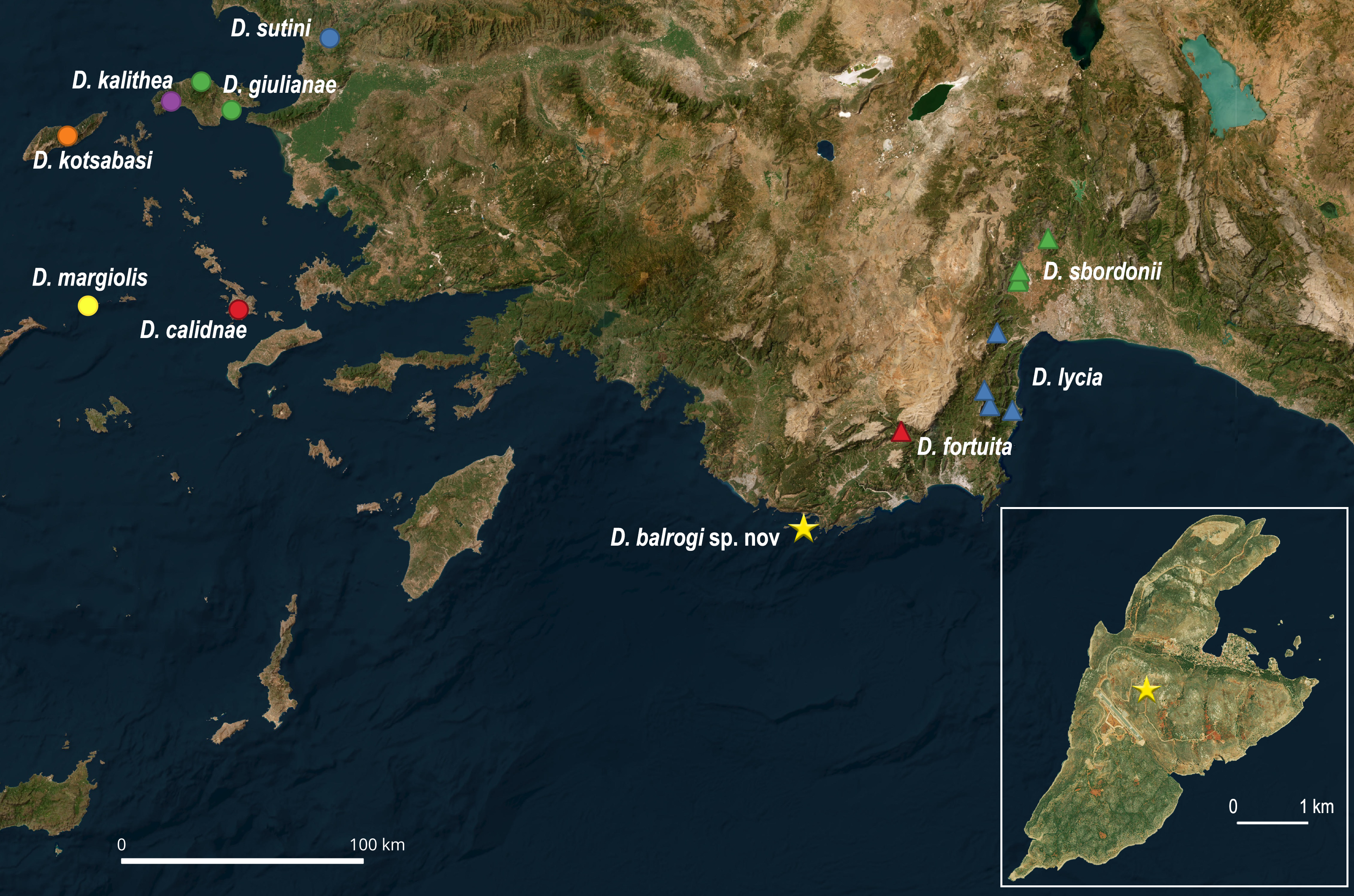
Geographic distribution of Dolichopoda balrogi and other species in the southeastern Greek Aegean islands and adjacent Anatolia, Turkey.
