= Labyrinth =

Elaborate, confusing structure in Greek mythology

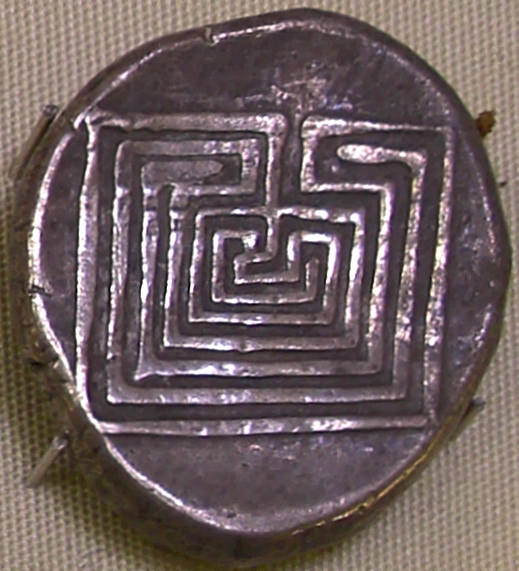
Silver coin from Knossos displaying the 7-course "Classical" design to represent the Labyrinth, c. 400 BC

In Greek mythology, the Labyrinth (Ancient Greek: λαβύρινθος, romanized: Labúrinthos) (Note: Ancient: [labýrintʰos], Modern: [laˈvirinθos]) is an elaborate, confusing structure designed and built by the mythological artificer Daedalus for King Minos of Crete at Knossos. Its function was to hold the Minotaur, the monster eventually killed by the hero Theseus. Daedalus had so cunningly made the Labyrinth that he could barely escape it after he built it.

Although early Cretan coins occasionally exhibit branching (multicursal) patterns, the single-path (unicursal) seven-course "Classical" design without branching or dead ends became associated with the Labyrinth on coins as early as 430 BC, and similar non-branching patterns became widely used as visual representations of the Labyrinth – even though both logic and literary descriptions make it clear that the Minotaur was trapped in a complex branching maze. Even as the designs became more elaborate, visual depictions of the mythological Labyrinth from the Roman era until the Renaissance are almost invariably unicursal. Branching mazes were reintroduced only when hedge mazes became popular during the Renaissance.

In English, the term labyrinth is generally synonymous with maze. As a result of the long history of unicursal representation of the mythological Labyrinth, however, many contemporary scholars and enthusiasts observe a distinction between the two. In this specialized usage, maze refers to a complex branching multicursal puzzle with choices of path and direction, while a unicursal labyrinth has only a single path to the center. A labyrinth in this sense has an unambiguous route to the center and back and presents no navigational challenge.

Unicursal labyrinths appeared as designs on pottery or basketry, as body art, and in etchings on walls of caves or churches. The Romans created many primarily decorative unicursal designs on walls and floors in tile or mosaic. Many labyrinths set in floors or on the ground are large enough that the path can be walked. Unicursal patterns have been used historically both in group ritual and for private meditation, and are increasingly found for therapeutic use in hospitals and hospices.

== Etymology ==
Labyrinth is a word of pre-Greek origin whose derivation and meaning are uncertain. Maximillian Mayer suggested in 1892 that labyrinthos might derive from labrys, a Lydian word for "double-bladed axe". Arthur Evans, who excavated the Minoan palace of Knossos in Crete early in the 20th century, suggested that the ruins there inspired the story of the labyrinth, and since the double axe motif appears in the palace ruins, he asserted that labyrinth could be understood to mean "the house of the double axe". The same symbol, however, was discovered in other palaces in Crete. Nilsson observed that in Crete the double axe is not a weapon and always accompanies goddesses or women and not a male god.

The association with "labrys" lost some traction when Linear B was deciphered in the 1950s, and an apparent Mycenaean Greek rendering of "labyrinth" appeared as da-pu₂-ri-to (𐀅𐀢𐀪𐀵). This may be related to the Minoan word du-pu₂-re, which appears in Linear A on libation tablets and in connection with Mount Dikte and Mount Ida, both of which are associated with caverns. Caverns near Gortyna, the Cretan capital in the 1st century AD, were called labyrinthos.

Pliny's Natural History gives four examples of ancient labyrinths: the Cretan labyrinth, an Egyptian labyrinth, a Lemnian labyrinth, and an Italian labyrinth. These are all complex underground structures, and this appears to have been the standard Classical understanding of the word.

Beekes also finds the relation with labrys speculative, and suggests instead a relation with Greek λαύρα ('narrow street').

== Ancient labyrinths ==
=== Cretan labyrinth ===
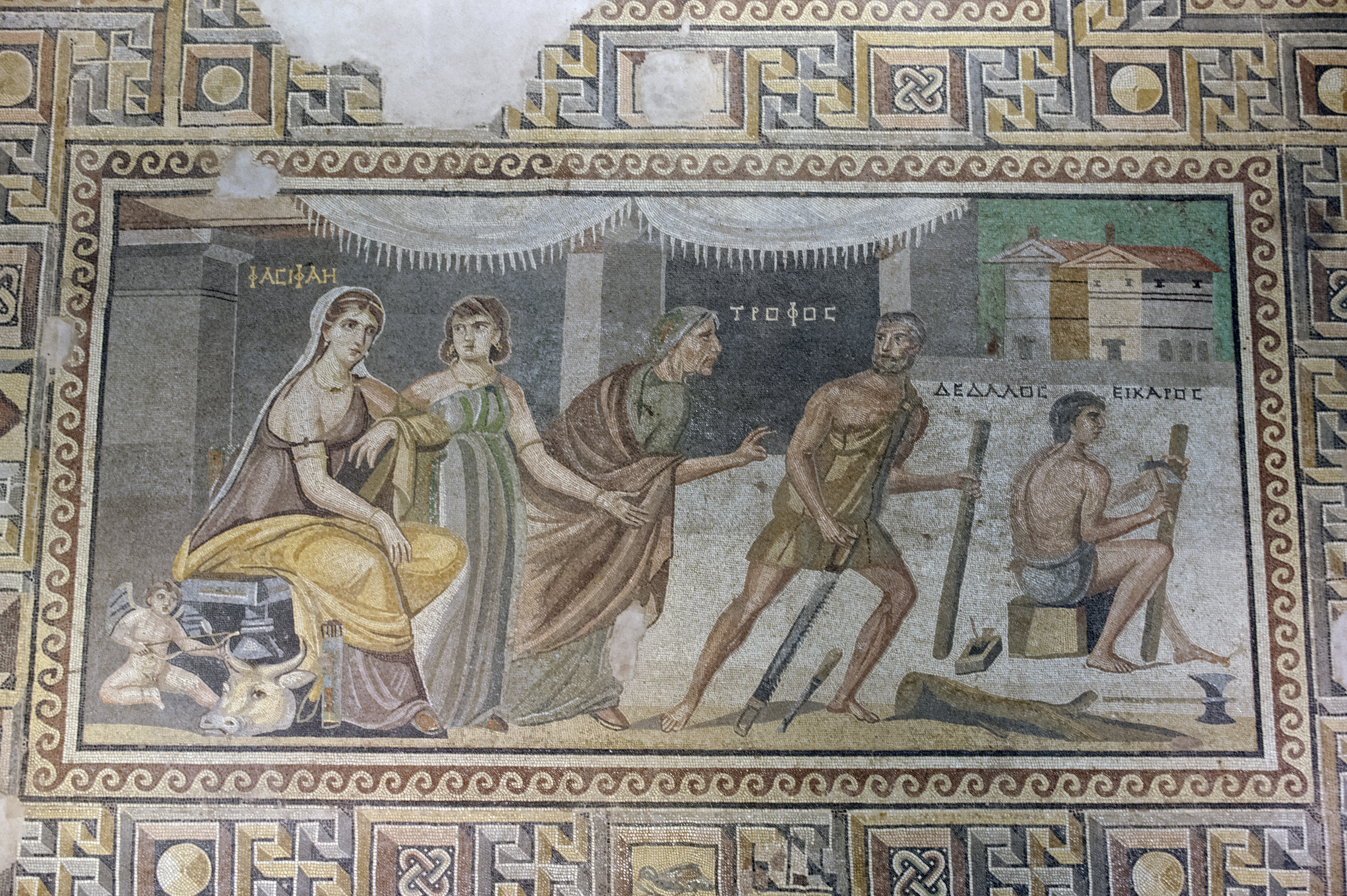
A Roman mosaic from Zeugma, Commagene (now in the Zeugma Mosaic Museum) depicting Daedalus, his son Icarus, Queen Pasiphaë, and two of her female attendants

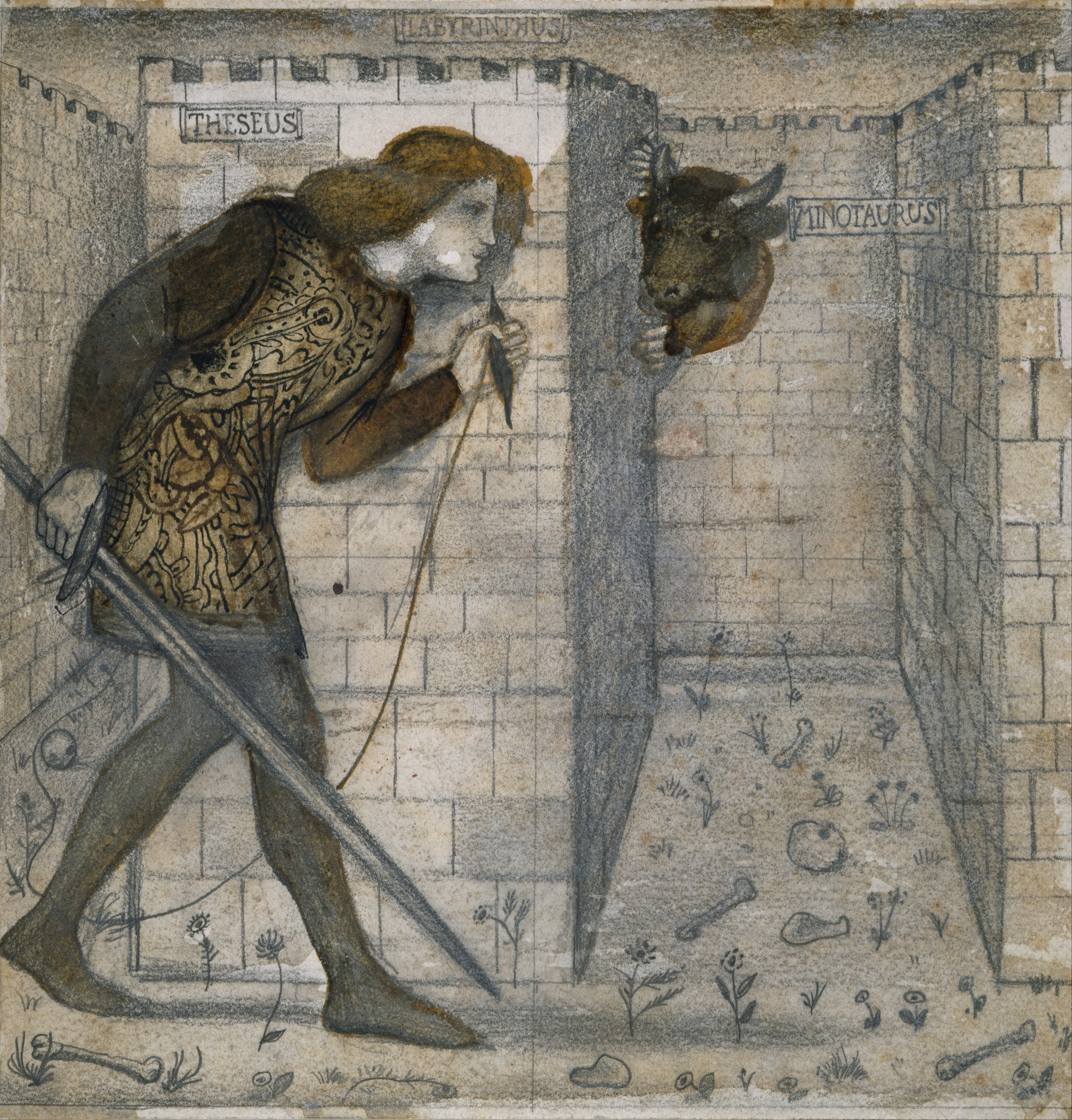
Theseus in the Minotaur's labyrinth, by Edward Burne-Jones, 1861

When the Bronze Age site at Knossos was excavated by archaeologist Arthur Evans, the complexity of the architecture prompted him to suggest that the palace had been the Labyrinth of Daedalus. Evans found various bull motifs, including an image of a man leaping over the horns of a bull, as well as depictions of a labrys carved into the walls. On the strength of a passage in the Iliad, it has been suggested that the palace was the site of a dancing-ground made for Ariadne by the craftsman Daedalus, where young men and women, of the age of those sent to Crete as prey for the Minotaur, would dance together. By extension, in popular legend the palace is associated with the myth of the Minotaur.

In the 2000s, archaeologists explored other potential sites of the labyrinth. Oxford University geographer Nicholas Howarth believes that "Evans's hypothesis that the palace of Knossos is also the Labyrinth must be treated sceptically." Howarth and his team conducted a search of an underground complex known as the Skotino cave but concluded that it was formed naturally. Another contender is a series of tunnels at Gortyn, accessed by a narrow crack but expanding into interlinking caverns. Unlike the Skotino cave, these caverns have smooth walls and columns, and appear to have been at least partially human-made. This site corresponds to a labyrinth symbol on a 16th-century map of Crete in a book of maps in the library of Christ Church, Oxford. A map of the caves themselves was produced by the French in 1821. The site was also used by German soldiers to store ammunition during the Second World War. Howarth's investigation was shown on a documentary produced for the National Geographic Channel.

=== The Egyptian labyrinth ===
In Book II of his Histories, Herodotus applies the term "labyrinth" to a building complex in Egypt "near the place called the City of Crocodiles", that he considered to surpass the pyramids. The structure, which may have been a collection of funerary temples such as are commonly found near Egyptian pyramids, was destroyed in antiquity and can only be partially reconstructed. During the nineteenth century, the remains of this ancient Egyptian structure were discovered at Hawara in the Faiyum Oasis by Flinders Petrie at the foot of the pyramid of the twelfth-dynasty pharaoh Amenemhat III (reigned c. 1860 BC to c. 1814 BC).

=== Pliny's Lemnian labyrinth ===
Pliny the Elder's Natural History (36.90) lists the legendary Smilis, reputed to be a contemporary of Daedalus, together with the historical mid-sixth-century BC architects and sculptors Rhoikos and Theodoros as two of the makers of the Lemnian labyrinth, which Andrew Stewart regards as "evidently a misunderstanding of the Samian temple's location en limnais ['in the marsh']."

=== Pliny's Italian labyrinth ===
According to Pliny, the Tomb of Lars Porsena contained an underground maze. Pliny's description of the exposed portion of the tomb is intractable; Pliny, it seems clear, had not observed this structure himself, but is quoting the historian and Roman antiquarian Varro.

=== Ancient labyrinths outside Europe ===
Unofficial flag of the Tohono O'odham featuring a 7-course labyrinth

A design essentially identical to the 7-course "classical" pattern appears in the Tohono O'odham culture of the Sonoran desert. It features I'itoi, the "Man in the Maze." The Tonoho O'odham pattern has two distinct differences from the classical: it is radial in design, and the entrance is at the top, where classical labyrinths have the entrance at the bottom (see below). The earliest appearances cannot be dated securely; the oldest is commonly dated to the 17th century.

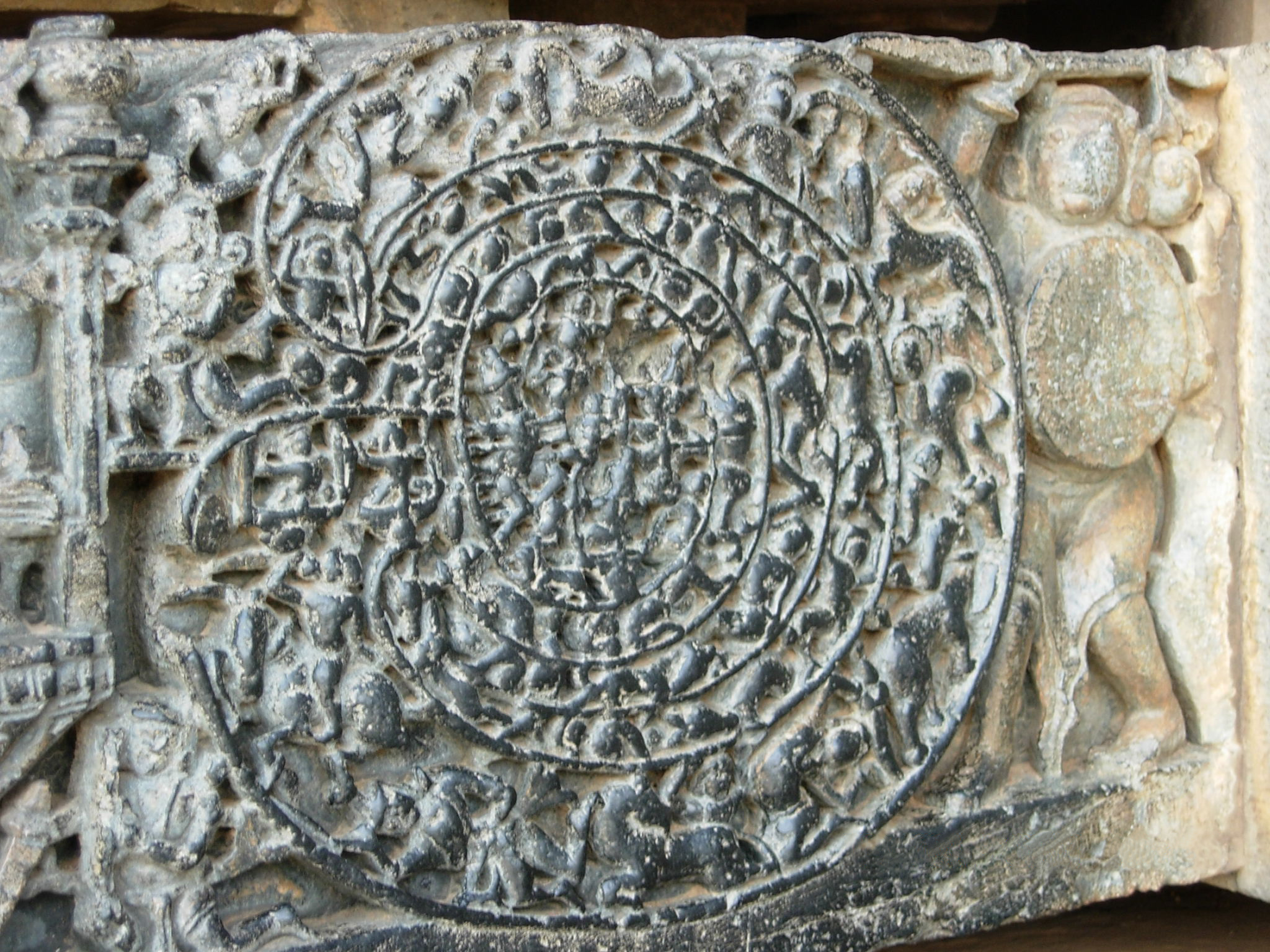
Carving showing the warrior Abhimanyu entering the chakravyuha – Hoysaleswara temple, Halebidu, India

Unsubstantiated claims have been made for the early appearance of labyrinth figures in India, such as a prehistoric petroglyph on a riverbank in Goa purportedly dating to circa 2500 BC. Other examples have been found among cave art in northern India and on a dolmen shrine in the Nilgiri Mountains, but are difficult to date accurately. Securely datable examples begin to appear only around 250 BC. Early labyrinths in India typically follow the Classical pattern or a local variant of it; some have been described as plans of forts or cities.

Labyrinths appear in Indian manuscripts and Tantric texts from the 17th century onward. They are often called "Chakravyuha" in reference to an impregnable battle formation described in the ancient Mahabharata epic. Lanka, the capital city of mythic Rāvana, is described as a labyrinth in the 1910 translation of Al-Beruni's India (c. 1030 AD) p. 306 (with a diagram on the following page).

By the White Sea, notably on the Solovetsky Islands, there have been preserved more than 30 stone labyrinths. The most remarkable monument is the Stone labyrinths of Bolshoi Zayatsky Island – a group of some 13 stone labyrinths on 0.4 km^{2} area of one small island. Local archaeologists have speculated that these labyrinths may be 2,000–3,000 years old, though most researchers remain dubious.

== Labyrinth as pattern ==
"Classical" or "Cretan" design, well-known in antiquity.

The 7-course "Classical" or "Cretan" pattern known from Cretan coins (ca 400–200 BC) appears in several examples from antiquity, some perhaps as early as the late Stone Age or early Bronze Age. Roman floor mosaics typically unite four copies of the classical labyrinth (or a similar pattern) interlinked around the center, squared off as the medium requires, but still recognisable. An image of the Minotaur or an allusion to the legend of the Minotaur appears at the center of many of these mosaic labyrinths.

The four-axis pattern as executed in Chartres Cathedral (early 1200s)

The four-axis medieval patterns may have developed from the Roman model, but are more varied in how the four quadrants of the design are traced out. The Minotaur or other danger is retained in the center of several medieval examples. The Chartres pattern (named for its appearance in Chartres Cathedral) is the most common medieval design; it appears in manuscripts as early as the 9th century.

== Medieval labyrinths and turf mazes ==
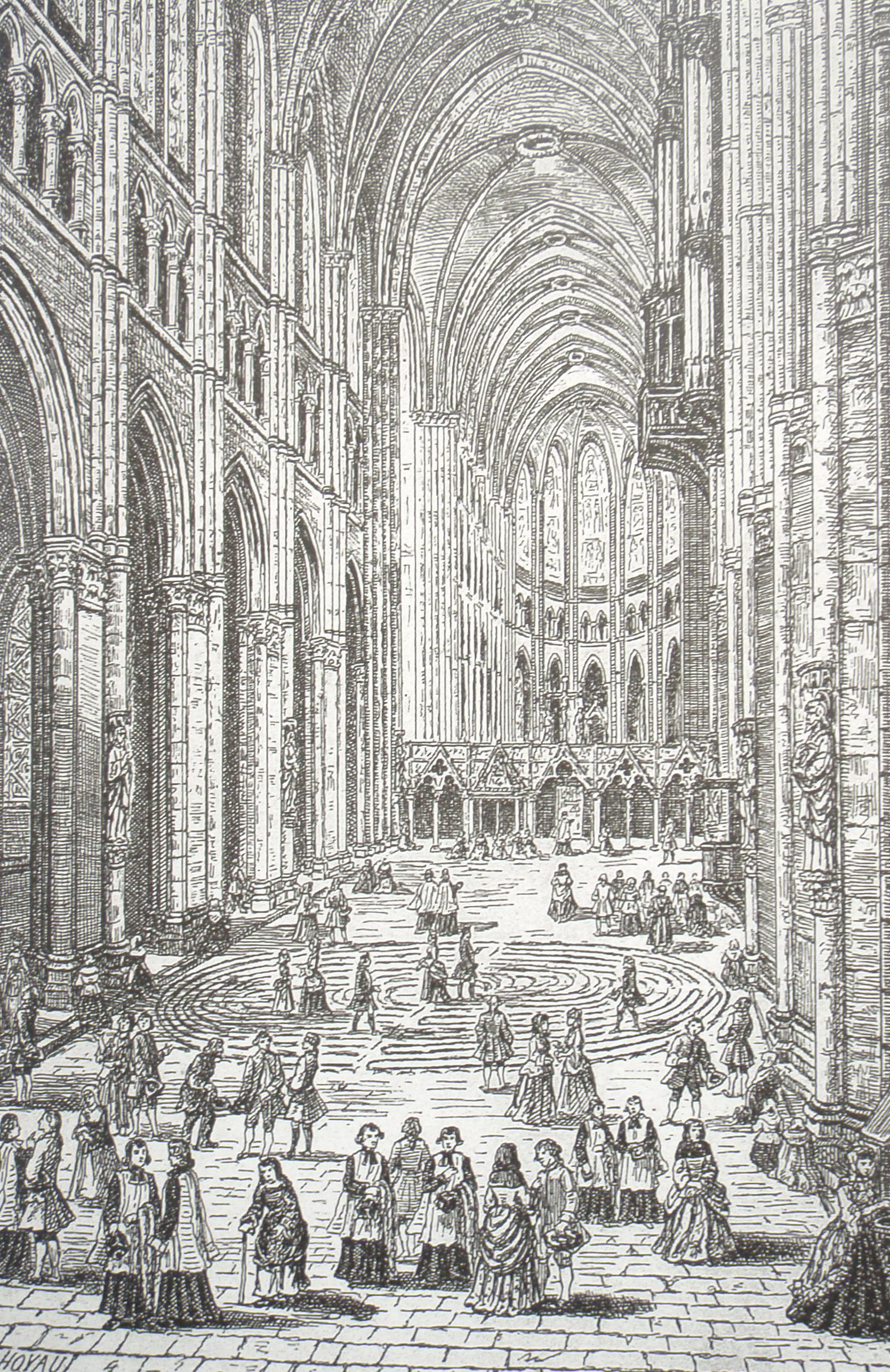
Chartres Cathedral, about 1750, Jean Baptiste Rigaud

When the early humanist Benzo d'Alessandria visited Verona before 1310, he noted the "Laberinthum which is now called the Arena"; perhaps he was seeing the cubiculi beneath the arena's missing floor. The full flowering of the medieval labyrinth came about from the twelfth through fourteenth centuries with the grand pavement labyrinths of the gothic cathedrals, notably Chartres, Reims and Amiens in northern France. The symbolism or purpose behind these is unclear, and may have varied from one installation to the next. Descriptions survive of French clerics performing a ritual Easter dance along the path on Easter Sunday. Some labyrinths may have originated as allusions to the Holy City; and some modern writers have theorized that prayers and devotions may have accompanied the perambulation of their intricate paths. Although some books (in particular guidebooks) suggest that the mazes on cathedral floors served as substitutes for pilgrimage paths, the earliest attested use of the phrase "chemin de Jerusalem" (path to Jerusalem) dates to the late 18th century when it was used to describe mazes at Reims and Saint-Omer. The accompanying ritual, depicted in Romantic illustrations as involving pilgrims following the maze on their knees while praying, may have been practiced at Chartres during the 17th century. The cathedral labyrinths are thought to be the inspiration for the many turf mazes in the UK, such as survive at Wing, Hilton, Alkborough, and Saffron Walden.

Over the same general period, some 500 or more non-ecclesiastical labyrinths were constructed in Scandinavia. These labyrinths, generally in coastal areas, are marked out with stones, most often in the simple 7- or 11-course classical forms. They often have names which translate as "Troy Town." They are thought to have been constructed by fishing communities: trapping malevolent trolls or winds in the labyrinth's coils might ensure a safe fishing expedition. There are also stone labyrinths on the Isles of Scilly, although none is known to date from before the nineteenth century.

There are examples of labyrinths in many disparate cultures. The symbol has appeared in various forms and media (petroglyphs, classic-form, medieval-form, pavement, turf, and basketry) at some time throughout most parts of the world, from Native North and South America to Australia, Java, India, and Nepal.

== Modern labyrinths ==
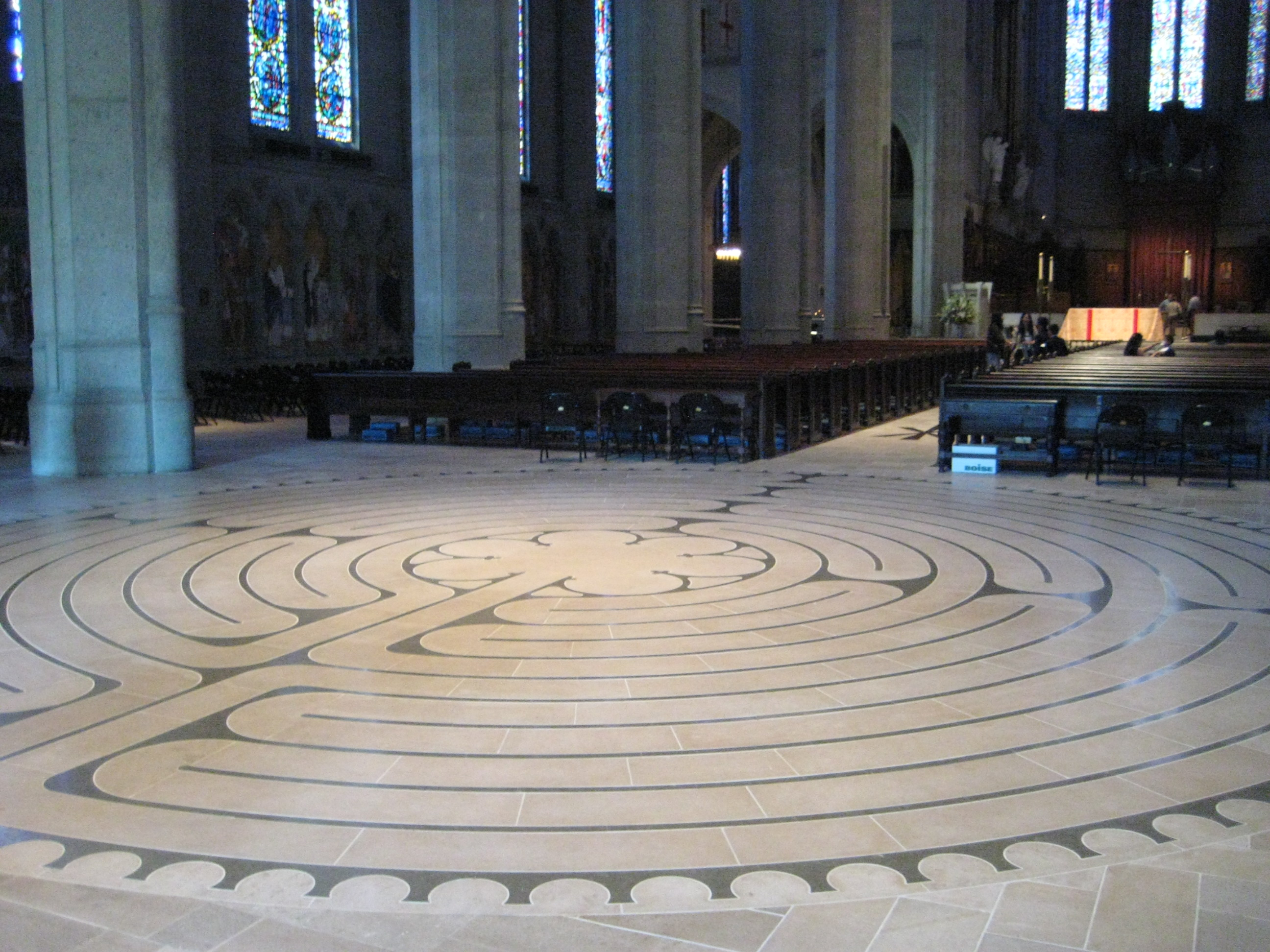
Labyrinth on floor of Grace Cathedral, San Francisco

Starting in the late 20th century, there has been a resurgence of interest in labyrinths and a revival in labyrinth building, of both unicursal and multicursal patterns. Approximately 6,000 labyrinths have been registered with the Worldwide Labyrinth Locator; these are located around the world in private properties, libraries, schools, gardens, and recreational areas, as well as famous temples and cathedrals.

The labyrinth is also treated in contemporary fine arts. Examples include Piet Mondrian's Pier and Ocean (1915), Joan Miró's Labyrinth (1923), Pablo Picasso's Minotauromachy (1935), M. C. Escher's Relativity (1953), Friedensreich Hundertwasser's Labyrinth (1957), Jean Dubuffet's Logological Cabinet (1970), Richard Long's Connemara sculpture (1971), Joe Tilson's Earth Maze (1975), Richard Fleischner's Chain Link Maze (1978), István Orosz's Atlantis Anamorphosis (2000), Dmitry Rakov's Labyrinth (2003), and drawings by contemporary American artist Mo Morales employing what the artist calls "Labyrinthine projection." The Italian painter Davide Tonato has dedicated many of his artistic works to the labyrinth theme. In modern imagery, the labyrinth of Daedalus is often represented by a multicursal maze, in which one may become lost.

Mark Wallinger has created a set of 270 enamel plaques of unicursal labyrinth designs, one for every tube station in the London Underground, to mark the 150th anniversary of the Underground. The plaques were installed over a 16-month period in 2013 and 2014, and each is numbered according to its position in the route taken by the contestants in the 2009 Guinness World Record Tube Challenge.

=== Cultural meanings ===
Prehistoric labyrinths may have served as traps for malevolent spirits or as paths for ritual dances. Many Roman and Christian labyrinths appear at the entrances of buildings, suggesting that they may have served a similar apotropaic purpose. In their cross-cultural study of signs and symbols, Patterns that Connect, Carl Schuster and Edmund Carpenter present various forms of the labyrinth and suggest various possible meanings, including not only a sacred path to the home of a sacred ancestor, but also, perhaps, a representation of the ancestor him/herself: "...many [New World] Indians who make the labyrinth regard it as a sacred symbol, a beneficial ancestor, a deity. In this they may be preserving its original meaning: the ultimate ancestor, here evoked by two continuous lines joining its twelve primary joints." Schuster also observes the common theme of the labyrinth being a refuge for a trickster; in India, the demon Ravana has dominion over labyrinths, the trickster Djonaha lives in a labyrinth according to Sumatran Bataks, and Europeans say it is the home of a rogue.

One can think of labyrinths as symbolic of pilgrimage: people walking the path ascend toward salvation or enlightenment. Mystical teachings in traditions across centuries suggest that they can also be understood as coded maps of the spiritual path.

==== Labyrinth walking ====
Labyrinth walking is a form of active meditation in which one navigates a labyrinth for meditative or therapeutic purposes. Modern labyrinths have been built in places of rehabilitation, such as prisons and hospitals, to be used in this way. While this activity is often connected with religious practice, it has been introduced into medical settings for spiritual and secular usage alike. Some faith-based researchers have claimed that labyrinth walking can help calm the mind and guide people through internal growth, while secular studies regarding its effectiveness in reducing stress are still ongoing.

=== Christian use ===
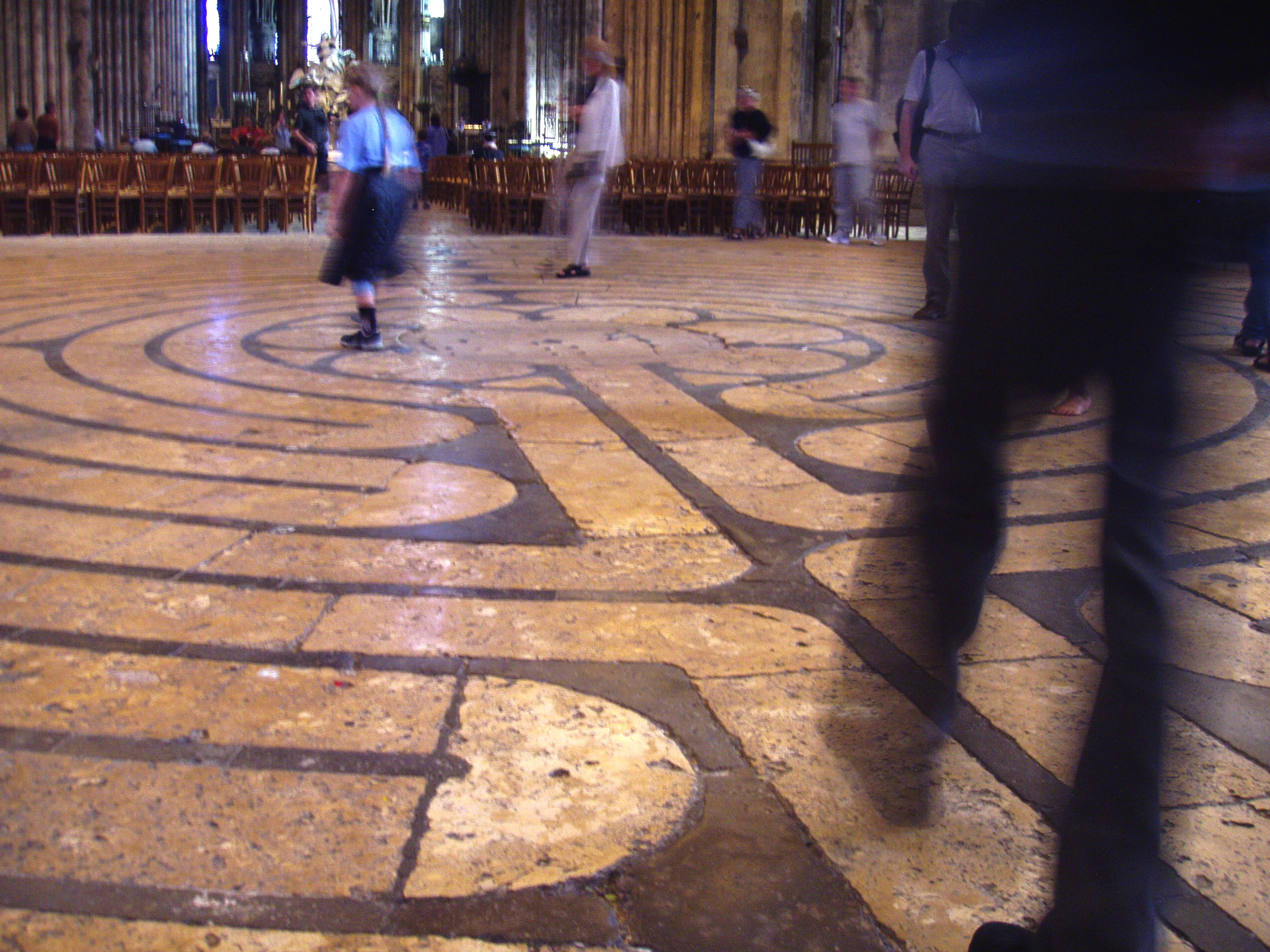
Walking the labyrinth at Chartres Cathedral

Labyrinths have on various occasions been used in Christian tradition as a part of worship. The earliest known example is from a fourth-century pavement at the Basilica of St Reparatus, at Orleansville, Algeria, with the words "Sancta Eclesia" [sic] at the center, though it is unclear how it might have been used in worship.

In medieval times, labyrinths began to appear on church walls and floors around 1000 AD. The most famous medieval labyrinth, with great influence on later practice, was created in Chartres Cathedral.

The use of labyrinths has recently been revived in some contexts of Christian worship. Many churches in Europe and North America have constructed permanent, typically unicursal, labyrinths, or employ temporary ones (e.g., painted on canvas or outlined with candles). For example, a labyrinth was set up on the floor of St Paul's Cathedral for a week in March 2000. Some conservative Christians disapprove of labyrinths, considering them pagan practices or "New Age" fads.

=== Usage in media ===
Labyrinths and mazes have been embraced by the video game industry, and countless video games include such a feature. For example, the 1994 video game Marathon features many maze-like passages the player must navigate.

A number of film, game, and music creations feature labyrinths. For instance, the avant-garde multi-screen film In the Labyrinth presents a search for meaning in a symbolic modern labyrinth. The well-received 2006 film Pan's Labyrinth draws heavily upon labyrinth legend for symbolism. A magical labyrinth appears in the third episode, "And The Horns of a Dilemma", of The Librarians. See Labyrinth (disambiguation) for a further list of titles. The cult classic film by Jim Henson Labyrinth (1986 film) features an enormous otherworldly maze which a young woman must traverse to save her younger brother.

The Argentine writer Jorge Luis Borges was entranced with the idea of the labyrinth, and used it extensively in his short stories (such as "The House of Asterion" in The Aleph). His use of it has inspired other authors (e.g. Umberto Eco's The Name of the Rose, Mark Z. Danielewski's House of Leaves). Additionally, Roger Zelazny's fantasy series The Chronicles of Amber features a labyrinth, called "the Pattern," which grants those who walk it the power to move between parallel worlds. In Rick Riordan's series Percy Jackson & the Olympians, the events of the fourth novel, The Battle of the Labyrinth, predominantly take place within the labyrinth of Daedalus, which has followed the heart of the West to settle beneath the United States. Ursula K. Le Guin used an underground labyrinth in the second book of her Earthsea series, The Tombs of Atuan, in which the series hero Ged is captured by the book's protagonist Tenar on his trip to the Kargish Empire – the spiritual power of the "Nameless Ones" is vested at least in part in the labyrinth. Australian author Sara Douglass incorporated some labyrinthine ideas in her series The Troy Game, in which the Labyrinth on Crete is one of several in the ancient world, created with the cities as a source of magical power. Lawrence Durrell's The Dark Labyrinth depicts travelers trapped underground in Crete. Because a labyrinth can serve as a metaphor for situations that are difficult to be extricated from, Octavio Paz titled his book on Mexican identity The Labyrinth of Solitude, describing the Mexican condition as orphaned and lost.

== See also ==
- Caerdroia
- Celtic maze
- I'itoi
- Julian's Bower
- Mizmaze
- Oxkintok
- Corn Maze
- The Backrooms
- Hedge maze
- Labyrinth of Egypt
- House of Leaves
