= Labyrinth (Miró) =

Sculpture series by Joan Miró

Coordinates: 43.7006°N 7.1151°E

Labyrinth is the set of sculptures and ceramics created by the Catalan artist Joan Miró for Marguerite Aimé Maeght, between 1961 and 1981. It is currently located at the Maeght Foundation in Saint Paul de Vence, France.

Labyrinth consists of 250 works, mainly sculptures, scattered in a terrace garden overlooking the sea, which illustrate the story of the connection between the Maeght family and Joan Miró. The labyrinth is a walk through the mind and imagination of the artist.

== History ==
In the early 1960s, Joan Miró took an active part in Aimé Maeght's project in Saint-Paul-de-Vence near Nice. Maeght visited the artist in Cala Major (Majorca), and entrusted Josep Lluís Sert — the architect who designed Barcelona's Fundació Joan Miró — with building a museum and a garden with space for artworks by Miró. Miró designed the garden as a labyrinth. He worked with Josep Artigas and Joan Gardy Artigas to create the ceramic artworks for the garden, and with Sert to design the building and surrounding space. Miró prepared several mockups of the artworks, which were finally built in marble, concrete, iron, bronze, and ceramics. These include La fourche ("The Fork", built in bronze in 1973) and Le Disque ("The Disk", built in ceramics that same year).

== Description ==
The labyrinth, which Miró conceived as a maze, is a garden between the mountains and the sea. It is organised along three axes: the highest terrace, dominated by a massive concrete arch; a fork on the head of a person suspended in the air overlooking the walkway; and a masonry tower with a ceramic wall made by the artist. The labyrinth can be traversed in any direction, and an hommage to Antoni Gaudí can be found (a round grey ceramic table reminiscent of Barcelona's Park Güell).

The sculptures include the Solar bird and the Lunar Bird, which neighbour the figure of a giant goddess whose genitalia are covered with the shell of a giant tortoise. There is also a giant egg, the giant cosmic egg:

L'œuf cosmique polarise les incertitudes de l'ombre et de la lumière. Plus haut, la porte vivante, entre la bête et le dieu. Nous sommes dans l'entre-deux où les possibles hésitent entre histoire et destin. (The cosmic egg contrasts the uncertainties of shadow and light. Above, the living door, between the beast and the god. We are in the middle ground where the possibilities waver between history and destiny.)

— Henri Maldiney.

== Bibliography ==
- Dupin, Jacques (1961). Miró (in French). Paris: Flammarion. OCLC 927721326.
- Dupin, Jacques (1993). Miró (in Catalan) (1a ed.). Barcelona: Polígrafa. ISBN 84-343-0726-X.
- Dupin, Jacques (1993a). Miró ([Nouv. éd.]. ed.). [Paris]: Flammarion. ISBN 2-08-011744-0.
- Maldiney, Henri (1961). La Fondation Maeght à Saint-Paul: Derrière le miroir (in French). Paris: Maeght.
- Penrose, Roland (1993). Miró (1st ed.). London: Thames and Hudson. ISBN 84-233-1976-8.
- Prat, Jean-Louis (2001). Joan Miró - métamorphoses des formes : collection de la Fondation Maeght; 1er avril - 25 juin 2001. Saint-Paul: Fondation Maeght. ISBN 2-900923-24-7.
