= Skotino Cave =

Cave in Crete, Greece

Coordinates: 35.3050°N 25.2974°E

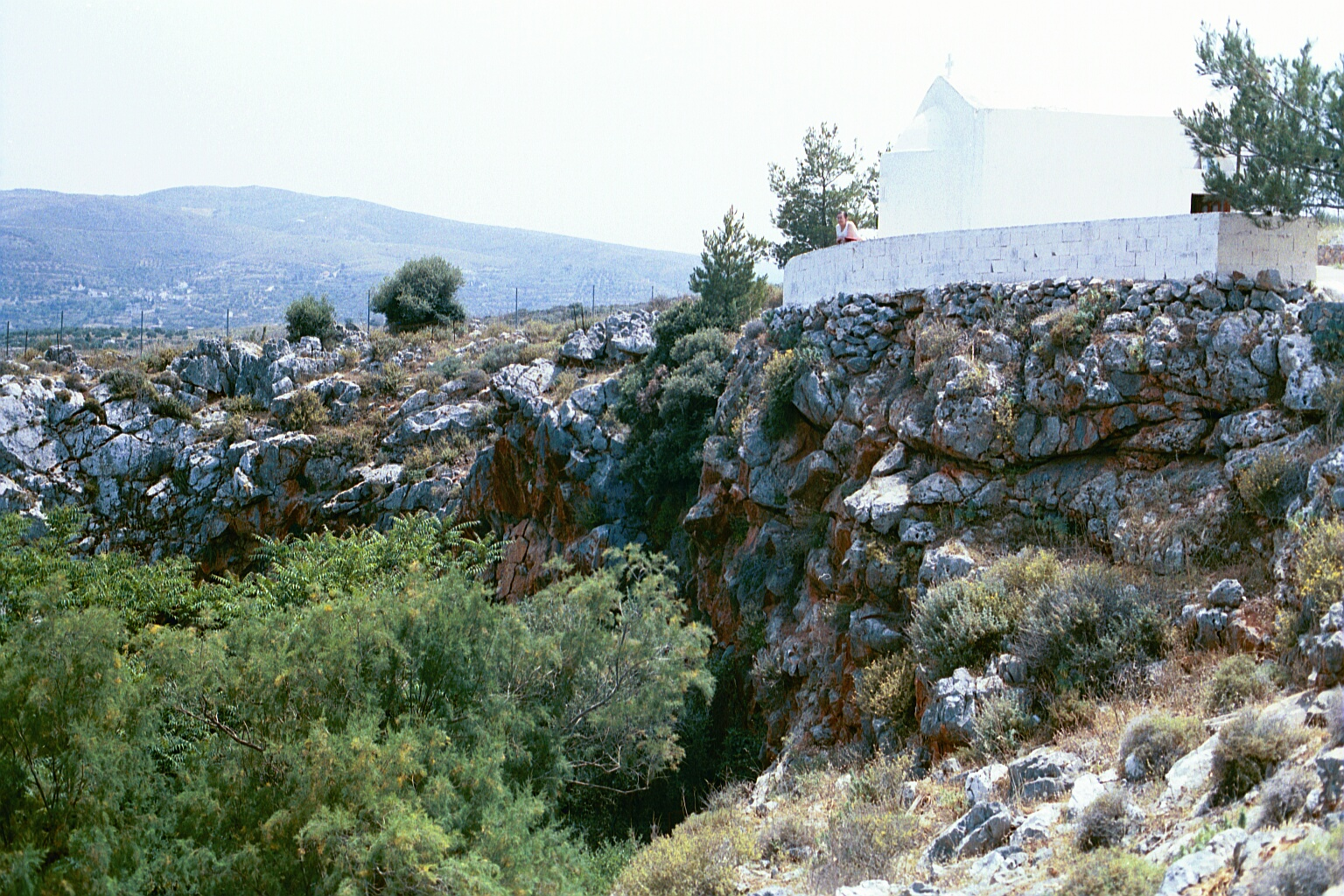
View with the church is at top right.

Skotino Cave (Greek: σπήλαιο Σκοτεινού) is one of the largest caves in Crete.

The cave lies high on a hill northwest of the village of Skotino, a few kilometers inland south of Gouves. It is also known as Agia Paraskevi Cave from the church dedicated to Saint Paraskevi built on top of it. The cave is 160 meters deep and 36 meters wide. The first archaeological examination on the site were carried out by Arthur Evans, the well-known British archaeologist who unearthed and partially restored Knossos in the early 20th century. A more comprehensive exploration was carried out by French and Greek archaeologists in the 1960s. They found a considerable number of bronze and ceramic votive offerings, the oldest of them dating from the earliest Minoan periods, suggesting the cave was an important sacred shrine dedicated to a female fertility deity, presumably Britomartis. The cave was still used in Classical Greek and Roman eras, when the fertility goddess Artemis or her Roman equivalent Diana replaced the Minoan deity.

== Bibliography ==
- Fisher, John and Garvey, Geoff (2007). The Rough Guide to Crete, 7th edition.
